= 2012–13 SC Preußen Münster season =

Preußen Münster
2012–13 season
- Chairman: Dr. Marco de Angelis
- Manager: Pavel Dochev
- Stadium: Preußenstadion, Münster, NRW
- 3. Liga: 4th
- DFB-Pokal: Second round
- Westphalia Cup: Semi–final

The 2012–13 SC Preußen Münster season is the 106th season in the club's football history.

== Review and events ==
In 2012–13 the club plays in the 3. Liga, the third tier of German football. It is the club's second season in this league, having been promoted from the Regionalliga in 2011.

The club also took part in the 2012–13 edition of the DFB-Pokal, the German Cup, where it reached the second round and will face Bundesliga side FC Augsburg next. The club had knocked out Bundesliga club Werder Bremen in the first round with a 4–2 victory.

Preußen Münster also takes part in the 2012–13 edition of the Westphalia Cup, having reached the second round against DSC Wanne-Eickel after a 5–0 win over TuS Hiltrup in the first round. In the round of 16, they defeated FC Brünninghausen with 8–0 and progressed to the quarter-final where they won against Sportfreunde Lotte 3–0.

== Matches ==
=== Legend ===
Win Draw Loss Postponed

=== 3. Liga ===
==== League fixtures and results ====
Match	Date	Time	Stadium	City	Opponent	Result	Attendance	Goalscorers		Source
Match	Date	Time	Stadium	City	Opponent	Result	Attendance	Preußen Münster	Opponent	Source
1	21 July	14:00	Wacker-Arena	Burghausen	Wacker Burghausen	2–0	3,000	Nazarov 12'; Taylor 44'	—	
2	28 July	14:00	Preußenstadion	Münster	Chemnitzer FC	1–0	7,121	Taylor 8'		
3	3 August	19:00	Stadion am Böllenfalltor	Darmstadt	Darmstadt 98	1–2	6,200	Bischoff 88'	Hesse 18'; Gaebler 78'	
4	8 August	19:00	Preußenstadion	Münster	Hansa Rostock	5–2	9,000	Heise 19'; Kühne 28' (pen.), 52' (pen.); Schmidt 57'; Taylor 83'	Plat 5'; Jordanov 18'	
5	11 August	14:00	BRITA-Arena	Wiesbaden	Wehen Wiesbaden	2–2	2,780	Bischoff 88'; Schmidt 90'+2'	Stroh-Engel 29', 68'	
6	25 August	14:00	Preußenstadion	Preußen Münster	1. FC Heidenheim	1–1	6,282	Bischoff 88'	Sailor 10'	
7	29 August	19:00	Erdgas Sportpark	Halle	Hallescher FC	2–0	8,506	Taylor 35' (pen.); Bischoff 90'+2'	—	
8	1 September	14:00	Preußenstadion	Münster	VfB Stuttgart II	0–0	6,024	—	—	
9	15 September	14:00	Osnatel-Arena	Osnabrück	VfL Osnabrück	2–0	15,000	Bischoff 43'; Nazarov 90+4'	—	
10	22 September	14:00	Preußenstadion	Münster	Arminia Bielefeld	4–0	14,512	Siegert 16'; Nazarov 46'; Taylor 48'; Kühne 58' (pen.)	—	
11	25 September	19:00	New Tivoli	Aachen	Alemannia Aachen	2–1	12,206	Taylor 65', 84'	Pozder 48'	
12	29 September	14:00	Preußenstadion	Münster	Borussia Dortmund II	1–0	7,224	Königs 83'	—	
13	6 October	14:00	Ludwigsparkstadion	Saarbrücken	1. FC Saarbrücken	0–0	4,227	—	—	
14	20 October	14:00	Preußenstadion	Münster	Kickers Offenbach	2–2	8,116	Taylor 38', 42'	Rathgeber 24', 85' (pen.)	
15	27 October	14:00	Wildparkstadion	Karlsruhe	Karlsruher SC	1–2	9,244	Taylor 52'	Hennings 15'; Çalhanoğlu 78'	
16	3 November	14:00	Preußenstadion	Münster	Rot-Weiß Erfurt	3–2	4,526	Kirsch 16'; Grote 35'	Ströhl 39'; Engelhardt 77'	
17	10 November	14:00	Gazi-Stadion	Stuttgart	Stuttgarter Kickers	2–0	3,100	Nazarov 3'; Menga 90'	—	
18	17 November	14:00	Preußenstadion	Münster	SpVgg Unterhaching	0–0	8,710	—	—	
19	24 November	14:00	Karl-Liebknecht-Stadion	Potsdam	Babelsberg 03	0–1	2,682	—	Essig 20' (pen.)	
20	1 December	14:00	Preußenstadion	Münster	Wacker Burghausen	2–0	5,667	Bischoff 56'; Königs 87'	—	
21	9 December	14:00	Stadion an der Gellertstraße	Chemnitz	Chemnitzer FC	2–2	3,150	Königs 72'; Bischoff 90+4'	Fink 3' (pen.); Bankert 13'	
22	15 December	14:00	Preußenstadion	Münster	Darmstadt 98	3–0	6,102	Königs 41', 72', 74'	—	
23	26 January	14:00	DKB-Arena	Rostock	Hansa Rostock	2–0	9,000	Siegert 38'; Königs 85'	—	
24	2 February	14:00	Preußenstadion	Münster	Wehen Wiesbaden	0–0	7,017	—	—	
25	9 February	14:00	Voith-Arena	Heidenheim	1. FC Heidenheim	1–3	8,000	Grote 65'	Niederlechner 11'; Strauß 29'; Bagceci 90'	
26	16 February	14:00	Preußenstadion	Münster	Hallescher FC	2–0	7,078	Kara 19' (pen.), 50'	—	
27	16 April	18:00	Gazi-Stadion	Stuttgart	VfB Stuttgart II	1–0	710	Röcker 62' (o.g.)	—	
28	2 March	14:00	Preußenstadion	Münster	VfL Osnabrück	3–1	15,050	Kara 12', 19', 26'	Zoller 39'	
29	9 March	14:00	Schüco-Arena	Bielefeld	Arminia Bielefeld	1–1	26,026	Bischoff 74' (pen.)	Hille 20'	
30	16 March	14:00	Preußenstadion	Münster	Alemannia Aachen	4–1	8,089	Nazarov 42'; Strujić 51' (o.g.); Kara 78'; Kirsch 81'	Thiele 57'	
31	30 March	14:00	Stadion Rote Erde	Dortmund	Borussia Dortmund II	0–0	3,652	—	—	
32	6 April	14:00	Preußenstadion	Münster	1. FC Saarbrücken	3–3	8,554	Bischoff 24'; Kara 51'; Taylor 60'	Stiefler 65', 90'; Ziemer 67'	
33	13 April	14:00	Sparda Bank Hessen Stadium	Offenbach	Kickers Offenbach	1–0	6,163	Nazarov 58'	—	
34	20 April	14:00	Preußenstadion	Münster	Karlsruher SC	2–1	14,465	Taylor 7', 61'	Krebs 74'	
35	27 April	14:00	Steigerwaldstadion	Erfurt	Rot-Weiß Erfurt	1–1	4,361	Taylor 40'	Pfingsten-Reddig 22' (pen.)	
36	4 May	14:00	Preußenstadion	Münster	Stuttgarter Kickers	0–1	12,245	—	Baumgärtel 78'	
37	11 May	13:30	Generali Sportpark	Unterhaching	SpVgg Unterhaching	0–3	2,750	—	Rohracker 19'; Schweinsteiger 75' (pen.); Voglsammer 90'	
38	18 May	13:30	Preußenstadion	Münster	Babelsberg 03	4–1	13,400	Taylor 12'; Kühne 21'; Bischoff 82'; Menga 90+2' (pen.)	Reiche 5'	

==== League table ====
===== Current league table =====
Pos	Team	Pld	W	D	L	GF	GA	GD	Pts	Promotion, qualification or relegation
2	Arminia Bielefeld (P)	38	22	10	6	59	32	+27	76	Promotion to 2. Bundesliga and qualification for DFB-Pokal
3	VfL Osnabrück	38	22	7	9	64	35	+29	73	Qualification to promotion play-offs and DFB-Pokal
4	Preußen Münster	38	20	12	6	63	33	+30	72	Qualification for DFB-Pokal
5	1. FC Heidenheim	38	21	9	8	69	47	+22	72	
6	Chemnitzer FC	38	15	10	13	56	47	+9	55	

Source: kicker
Rules for classification: 1) points; 2) goal difference; 3) number of goals scored.
(P) Promoted

===== Results summary =====
Overall								Home						Away					
Pld	W	D	L	GF	GA	GD	Pts	W	D	L	GF	GA	GD	W	D	L	GF	GA	GD
36	19	12	5	59	29	+30	69	11	6	1	36	14	+22	8	6	4	23	15	+8

Last updated: 4 May 2013.
Source: Kicker.de

=== DFB-Pokal ===
Round	Date	Time	Stadium	City	Opponent	Result	Attendance	Goalscorers		Source
Round	Date	Time	Stadium	City	Opponent	Result	Attendance	Preußen Münster	Opponent	Source
1	19 August	16:00	Preußenstadion	Münster	Werder Bremen	4–2 aet	18,000	Taylor 54', 81', 118'; Nazarov 96'	Elia 45'; Füllkrug 67'	
2	30 October	19:00	Preußenstadion	Münster	FC Augsburg	0–1	16,269	—	Callsen-Bracker 69'	

=== Westphalia Cup ===
Round	Date	Time	Stadium	City	Opponent	Result	Goalscorers		Source
Round	Date	Time	Stadium	City	Opponent	Result	Preußen Münster	Opponent	Source
1	4 September	18:15	Osttor 85	Münster	TuS Hiltrup	5–0	Königs 15', 59'; Nazarov 21', 40'; Siegert 88'	—	
2	13 October	15:00	Mondpalast Arena	Herne	DSC Wanne-Eickel	2–1	Menga 24'; Dowidat 52'	Schulz 68'	
R16	20 November	19:30	Preußenstadion	Münster	FC Brünninghausen	8–0	Menga 11', 50', 80'; Truckenbrod 35', 45'; Scherder 56'; Schmider 60'; Königs 87'	—	
QF	9 April	19:00	connectM-Arena	Lotte	Sportfreunde Lotte	3–0	Bischoff 62'; Taylor 68', 75'	—	
5	14 May	19:00	Jahnstadion	Rheda-Wiedenbrück	SC Wiedenbrück				
6									

=== Overall record ===
As of 30 April 2013

Competition	First match	Last match	Record							
Competition	First match	Last match	G	W	D	L	GF	GA	GD	Win %
3. Liga	21 July 2012	18 May 2013	35	19	12	4	59	28	+31	54.29
DFB-Pokal	19 August 2012	30 October 2012	2	1	0	1	4	3	+1	50.00
Westphalia Cup	4 September 2012		4	4	0	0	18	1	+17	100.00
Total			41	24	12	5	81	32	+49	58.54

== Squad and statistics ==
As of 30 April 2013

No.	Pos	Nat	Player	Total		3. Liga		DFB-Pokal		Westphalia Cup	
No.	Pos	Nat	Player	Apps	Goals	Apps	Goals	Apps	Goals	Apps	Goals
Goalkeepers
12	GK	(Germany) GER	Hannes Frerichs	1	0	0	0	0	0	1	0
25	GK	(Germany) GER	Daniel Masuch	39	0	35	0	2	0	2	0
35	GK	(Germany) GER	Maximilian Schulze Niehues	2	0	0	0	0	0	2	0
Defenders
2	DF	(Germany) GER	Philip Röhe	1	0	0	0	0	0	1	0
3	DF	(Germany) GER	Fabian Hergesell	36	0	33	0	2	0	1	0
4	DF	(Germany) GER	Robin Neupert	14	0	10	0	0	0	4	0
5	DF	(Germany) GER	Patrick Kirsch	30	2	27	2	2	0	1	0
6	DF	(Germany) GER	Kevin Schöneberg	33	0	30	0	2	0	1	0
7	DF	(Germany) GER	Philip Heise	24	1	19	1	1	0	4	0
16	DF	(Germany) GER	Dominik Schmidt	14	2	12	2	1	0	1	0
17	DF	(France) FRA	Clément Halet	1	0	1	0	0	0	0	0
26	DF	(Germany) GER	Cüneyt Köz	6	0	5	0	0	0	1	0
44	DF	(Germany) GER	Simon Scherder	6	1	3	0	0	0	3	1
Midfielders
8	MF	(Germany) GER	Stefan Kühne	35	3	32	3	2	0	1	0
10	MF	(Portugal) POR	Amaury Bischoff	35	10	31	9	2	0	2	1
15	MF	(Netherlands) NED	Mahmut Sönmez	5	0	3	0	0	0	2	0
18	MF	(Germany) GER	Rico Schmider	13	1	10	0	0	0	3	1
20	MF	(Germany) GER	Dennis Grote	35	2	33	2	2	0	0	0
21	MF	(Germany) GER	Jens Truckenbrod	3	2	0	0	0	0	3	2
23	MF	(Germany) GER	Pascal Koopmann	0	0	0	0	0	0	0	0
27	MF	(Turkey) TUR	Mehmet Kara	13	7	12	7	0	0	1	0
30	MF	(Germany) GER	Benjamin Siegert	35	3	32	2	2	0	1	1
Forwards
9	FW	(United States) USA	Matthew Taylor	35	20	32	15	2	3	1	2
11	FW	(Germany) GER	Dima Nazarov	39	9	33	6	2	1	4	2
14	FW	(Germany) GER	Marco Königs	39	10	33	7	2	0	4	3
19	FW	(Senegal) SEN	Babacar N'Diaye	0	0	0	0	0	0	0	0
33	FW	(Democratic Republic of the Congo) COD	Addy-Waku Menga	18	5	14	1	1	0	3	4
Players no longer at the club
	DF	(Germany) GER	Tommy Grupe	2	0	1	0	0	0	1	0
	MF	(Germany) GER	Julian Büscher	4	0	1	0	0	0	3	0
	MF	(Germany) GER	Dennis Dowidat	12	1	8	0	1	0	3	1
