= 2011–12 SC Preußen Münster season =

SC Preußen Münster
2011–12 season
- Manager: Marc Fascher
- 3rd Liga: 12th
- Top goalscorer: Stefan Kühne (7 goals)

The 2011–12 SC Preußen Münster season started on 23 July against SpVgg Unterhaching in the 3rd Liga.

Preußen Münster finished 12th in the league table.

== Results ==
=== Legend ===
Win Draw Loss Postponed

=== 3rd Liga ===
23 July 2011 1	Preußen Münster	1–1	SpVgg Unterhaching	Münster
14:00 CEST	Güvenışık 19'	Match report	Thiel 51'	Stadium: Preußenstadion; Attendance: 7,465; Referee: Tobias Stieler

2 August 2011 2	Chemnitzer FC	1–2	Preußen Münster	Chemnitz
18:30 CEST	Garbuschewski 2'	Match report	Siegert 1', 18'	Stadium: Stadion an der Gellertstraße; Attendance: 5,334; Referee: Robert Kempter

6 August 2011 3	Preußen Münster	1–0	Rot-Weiß Oberhausen	Münster
13:30 CEST	Vunguidica 52'	Match report		Stadium: Preußenstadion; Attendance: 6,124; Referee: Felix Zwayer

13 August 2011 4	Carl Zeiss Jena	1–3	Preußen Münster	Jena
14:00 CEST	Jovanović 13'	Match report	Ornatelli 34'; N'Diaye 72'; Loose 82'	Stadium: Ernst-Abbe-Sportfeld; Attendance: 5,345; Referee: Peter Sippel

17 August 2011 5	Preußen Münster	1–1	SV Babelsberg 03	Münster
19:00 CEST	Kirsch 37'	Match report	Stroh-Engel 88'	Stadium: Preußenstadion; Attendance: 10,114; Referee: Benjamin Brand

21 August 2011 6	Werder Bremen II	0–0	Preußen Münster	Bremen
14:00 CEST		Match report		Stadium: Weserstadion Platz 11; Attendance: 1,612; Referee: Tim Sönder

27 August 2011 7	Preußen Münster	1–1	VfB Stuttgart II	Münster
14:00 CEST	Duah 87'	Match report	Lang 56'	Stadium: Preußenstadion; Attendance: 5,705; Referee: Sven Jablonski

10 September 2011 8	VfL Osnabrück	1–0	Preußen Münster	Osnabrück
14:00 CEST	Kotuljac 80'	Match report		Stadium: Osnatel-Arena; Attendance: 15,200; Referee: Benjamin Cortus

13 September 2011 9	Preußen Münster	1–0	VfR Aalen	Münster
19:00 CEST	Kirsch 44'	Match report		Stadium: Preußenstadion; Attendance: 6,312; Referee: Sascha Stegemann

17 September 2011 10	SV Darmstadt 98	2–1	Preußen Münster	Darmstadt
14:00 CEST	Zimmerman 28'; Latza 71'	Match report	Vunguidica 71'	Stadium: Stadion am Böllenfalltor; Attendance: 5,000; Referee: Martin Petersen

12 November 2011 11	Preußen Münster	0–0	Arminia Bielefeld	Münster
15:00 CET		Match report		Stadium: Preußenstadion; Attendance: 15,050 (sell-out); Referee: Patrick Ittrich

1 October 2011 12	SV Wehen Wiesbaden	3–0	Preußen Münster	Wiesbaden
14:00 CEST	Book 14'; Duah 30' (o.g.); Wohlfarth 38'	Match report		Stadium: BRITA-Arena; Attendance: 3,396; Referee: Eduard Beitinger

15 October 2011 13	Preußen Münster	2–0	SSV Jahn Regensburg	Münster
14:00 CEST	Güvenışık 52'; Ornatelli 90'	Match report		Stadium: Preußenstadion; Attendance: 6,719; Referee: Markus Wingenbach

22 October 2011 14	Rot-Weiß Erfurt	1–1	Preußen Münster	Erfurt
14:00 CEST	Reichwein 37'	Match report	Kluft 38'	Stadium: Steigerwaldstadion; Attendance: 4,975; Referee: Karl Valentin

29 October 2011 15	Preußen Münster	0–0	SV Wacker Burghausen	Münster
14:00 CEST		Match report		Stadium: Preußenstadion; Attendance: 6,475; Referee: Malte Dittrich

5 November 2011 16	1. FC Saarbrücken	2–2	Preußen Münster	Saarbrücken
14:00 CET	Pisano 30', 87'	Match report	N'Diaye 67'; Vujanović 86'	Stadium: Ludwigsparkstadion; Attendance: 6,044; Referee: Robert Kampka

19 November 2011 17	SV Sandhausen	2–0	Preußen Münster	Sandhausen
14:00 CET	Glibo 37'; Blum 83'	Match report		Stadium: Hardtwaldstadion; Attendance: 3,410; Referee: Thomas Metzen

26 November 2011 18	Preußen Münster	2–1	1. FC Heidenheim	Münster
14:00 CET	Vujanović 1', 61'	Match report	Jabiri 82'	Stadium: Preußenstadion; Attendance: 5,437; Referee: Harm Osmers

19 November 2011 19	Kickers Offenbach	3–0	Preußen Münster	Offenbach
14:00 CET	Husterer 27'; Vogler 53'; Cincotta 83'	Match report		Stadium: Stadion am Bieberer Berg; Attendance: 6,993; Referee: Arno Blos

11 December 2011 20	Preußen Münster	2–2	Chemnitzer FC	Münster
14:00 CET	Kühne 24', 60' (pen.)	Match report	Henning 73', 90+3'	Stadium: Preußenstadion; Attendance: 6,160; Referee: Eduard Beitinger

17 December 2011 21	SpVgg Unterhaching	2–1	Preußen Münster	Unterhaching
14:00 CET	Niederlechner 67'; Krontiris 78' (pen.)	Match report	Kluft 90'	Stadium: Stadion am Sportpark; Attendance: 1,750; Referee: Manuel Kunzman

21 January 2012 22	Rot-Weiß Oberhausen	v	Preußen Münster	Oberhausen
13:30 CET				Stadium: Niederrheinstadion

28 January 2012 23	Preußen Münster	v	Carl Zeiss Jena	Münster
14:00 CET				Stadium: Preußenstadion

3 February 2012 24	SV Babelsberg 03	v	Preußen Münster	Babelsberg
19:00 CET				Stadium: Karl-Liebknecht-Stadion

10 February 2012 25	Preußen Münster	v	Werder Bremen II	Münster
19:00 CET				Stadium: Preußenstadion

26	VfB Stuttgart II	v	Preußen Münster	Stuttgart
				Stadium: Gazi-Stadion auf der Waldau

27	Preußen Münster	v	VfL Osnabrück	Münster
				Stadium: Preußenstadion

28	VfR Aalen	v	Preußen Münster	Aalen
				Stadium: Scholz-Arena

29	Preußen Münster	v	SV Darmstadt 98	Münster
				Stadium: Preußenstadion

30	Arminia Bielefeld	v	Preußen Münster	Bielefeld
				Stadium: Schüco-Arena

31	Preußen Münster	v	SV Wehen Wiesbaden	Münster
				Stadium: Preußenstadion

32	SSV Jahn Regensburg	v	Preußen Münster	Regensburg
				Stadium: Jahnstadion

33	Preußen Münster	v	Rot-Weiß Erfurt	Münster
				Stadium: Preußenstadion

34	SV Wacker Burghausen	v	Preußen Münster	Burghausen
				Stadium: Wacker-Arena

35	Preußen Münster	v	1. FC Saarbrücken	Münster
				Stadium: Preußenstadion

36	Preußen Münster	v	SV Sandhausen	Münster
				Stadium: Preußenstadion

28 April 2012 37	1. FC Heidenheim	v	Preußen Münster	Heidenheim
13:30 CEST				Stadium: Voith-Arena

5 May 2012 38	Preußen Münster	v	Kickers Offenbach	Münster
13:30 CEST				Stadium: Preußenstadion

== Roster and statistics ==
Squad Season 2011–12
Players			3rd Liga	
No.	Player	Nat.	MP	G
Goalkeepers
1	David Buchholz	German	0	0
25	Daniel Masuch	German	21	0
35	Maximilian Schulze Niehues	German	0	0
Defenders
6	Jürgen Duah	German	18	1
17	Clément Halet	French	20	0
7	Philip Heise	German	11	0
22	Patric Huckle	German	21	0
5	Patrick Kirsch	German	21	2
24	Dominique Ndjeng	Cameroon	0	0
4	Marco Riemer	German	8	0
16	Julian Westermann	German	1	9
Midfielders
11	Jonathan Beaulieu-Bourgault	Canadian	13	0
31	Björn Kluft	German	15	2
8	Stefan Kühne	German	16	2
14	Julian Loose	German	13	1
23	Massimo Ornatelli	German	19	2
18	Rico Schmider	German	1	0
30	Benjamin Siegert	German	8	2
21	Jens Truckenbrod	German	21	0
13	José Pierre Vunguidica	Angolan	15	2
Forwards
9	Daniel Chitsulo	Malawian	4	0
80	Sercan Güvenışık	Turkish	15	2
19	Babacar N'Diaye	Senegalese	11	2
15	Radovan Vujanović	Serbian	14	3
MP = Matches played — G = Goals scored
