= Rohe (disambiguation) =

Rohe is the territory or boundaries of iwi (tribes) of New Zealand.

Rohe may also refer to:

- Rohe (mythology)
- Rohe, Estonia, a village

== People with the surname ==
- Ludwig Mies van der Rohe, architect
- Alice Rohe, journalist
- Georgia van der Rohe, German dancer, actress and director
- George Rohe (1874–1957), Major League Baseball infielder
- Alice Rohe (1876–1957), American author and journalist
- Philip Röhe (1994), German footballer
