= 2007–08 VfL Bochum season =

VfL Bochum
2007–08 season
- Chairman: Werner Altegoer
- Head Coach: Marcel Koller
- Stadium: rewirpowerSTADION
- Bundesliga: 12th
- DFB-Pokal: Second Round
- Top goalscorer: League: Šesták (13); All: Šesták (13)
- Highest home attendance: 31,328 (vs Bayern Munich, 20 October 2007; vs Borussia Dortmund, 29 March 2008; vs Schalke 04, 6 May 2008)
- Lowest home attendance: 18,615 (vs 1. FC Nürnberg, 29 September 2007)
- Average home league attendance: 24,398
Home colours	Away colours	Third colours

The 2007–08 VfL Bochum season was the 70th season in club history.

== Matches ==
=== Legend ===
Win Draw Loss

=== Bundesliga ===
11 August 2007 1	VfL Bochum	2–2	Werder Bremen	Bochum
15:30	Šesták 47'; Bechmann 49'		Diego 39' (pen.); Sanogo 45+1'	Stadium: rewirpowerSTADION; Attendance: 29,037; Referee: Knut Kircher (Rottenburg)

19 August 2007 2	Energie Cottbus	1–2	VfL Bochum	Cottbus
17:00	Skela 49'		Bechmann 14', 42'	Stadium: Stadion der Freundschaft; Attendance: 16,382; Referee: Helmut Fleischer (Ulm)

24 August 2007 3	VfL Bochum	2–1	Hamburger SV	Bochum
20:30	Šesták 45'; Imhof 83'		Van der Vaart 86' (pen.)	Stadium: rewirpowerSTADION; Attendance: 30,449; Referee: Michael Weiner (Giesen)

1 September 2007 4	Hannover 96	3–2	VfL Bochum	Hannover
15:30	Hanke 12'; Rosenthal 36'; Hashemian 71'		Bechmann 44'; Maltritz 66' (pen.)	Stadium: AWD-Arena; Attendance: 30,794; Referee: Michael Kempter (Sauldorf)

15 September 2007 5	Bayer Leverkusen	2–0	VfL Bochum	Leverkusen
15:30	Haggui 62'; Friedrich 88'			Stadium: BayArena; Attendance: 22,500; Referee: Markus Merk (Otterbach)

21 September 2007 6	VfL Bochum	0–0	Eintracht Frankfurt	Bochum
20:30				Stadium: rewirpowerSTADION; Attendance: 25,536; Referee: Jochen Drees (Münster-Sarmsheim)

26 September 2007 7	VfB Stuttgart	1–0	VfL Bochum	Stuttgart
20:00	Hilbert 50'			Stadium: Gottlieb-Daimler-Stadion; Attendance: 34,000; Referee: Florian Meyer (Burgdorf)

29 September 2007 8	VfL Bochum	3–3	1. FC Nürnberg	Bochum
15:30	Mięciel 62'; Šesták 43', 66'		Kluge 40', 60'; Misimović 81'	Stadium: rewirpowerSTADION; Attendance: 18,615; Referee: Herbert Fandel (Kyllburg)

5 October 2007 9	Borussia Dortmund	2–1	VfL Bochum	Dortmund
20:30	Tinga 17'; Federico 70'		Mięciel 35'	Stadium: Signal Iduna Park; Attendance: 72,200; Referee: Manuel Gräfe (Berlin)

20 October 2007 10	VfL Bochum	1–2	Bayern Munich	Bochum
15:30	Grote 11'		Ribéry 35'; Schweinsteiger 78'	Stadium: rewirpowerSTADION; Attendance: 31,328; Referee: Herbert Fandel (Kyllburg)

27 October 2007 11	Hertha BSC	2–0	VfL Bochum	Berlin
15:30	Maltritz 26' (o.g.); Pantelić 35'			Stadium: Olympiastadion; Attendance: 34,580; Referee: Wolfgang Stark (Ergolding)

4 November 2007 12	VfL Bochum	5–3	VfL Wolfsburg	Bochum
17:00	Šesták 4', 44'; Maltritz 20' (pen.); Fuchs 42'; Epalle 63'		Schäfer 49'; Grafite 56', 73'	Stadium: rewirpowerSTADION; Attendance: 20,940; Referee: Peter Gagelmann (Bremen)

9 November 2007 13	MSV Duisburg	0–2	VfL Bochum	Duisburg
20:30			Imhof 29'; Bechmann 84'	Stadium: MSV-Arena; Attendance: 24,259; Referee: Günter Perl (Pullach)

24 November 2007 14	VfL Bochum	3–0	Arminia Bielefeld	Bochum
15:30	Mięciel 12', 15'; Dabrowski 55'			Stadium: rewirpowerSTADION; Attendance: 20,478; Referee: Michael Kempter (Sauldorf)

1 December 2007 15	Schalke 04	1–0	VfL Bochum	Gelsenkirchen
15:30	Bordon 32'			Stadium: Arena AufSchalke; Attendance: 61,482; Referee: Florian Meyer (Burgdorf)

8 December 2007 16	VfL Bochum	2–2	Karlsruher SC	Bochum
15:30	Šesták 18', 59'		Hajnal 24'; Freis 56'	Stadium: rewirpowerSTADION; Attendance: 20,784; Referee: Knut Kircher (Rottenburg)

16 December 2007 17	Hansa Rostock	2–0	VfL Bochum	Rostock
17:00	Bülow 7'; Hähnge 43'			Stadium: DKB-Arena; Attendance: 15,000; Referee: Felix Brych (Munich)

3 February 2008 18	Werder Bremen	1–2	VfL Bochum	Bremen
17:00	Jensen 44'		Auer 68'; Yahia 84'	Stadium: Weserstadion; Attendance: 37,149; Referee: Michael Weiner (Giesen)

9 February 2008 19	VfL Bochum	3–3	Energie Cottbus	Bochum
15:30	Ipša 7' (o.g.); Šesták 42'; Auer 68'		Papadopulos 45'; Skela 69'; Jelić 79'	Stadium: rewirpowerSTADION; Attendance: 22,075; Referee: Babak Rafati (Hannover)

17 February 2008 20	Hamburger SV	3–0	VfL Bochum	Hamburg
17:00	Olić 40'; Jarolím 64', 71'			Stadium: AOL Arena; Attendance: 50,069; Referee: Manuel Gräfe (Berlin)

22 February 2008 21	VfL Bochum	2–1	Hannover 96	Bochum
20:30	Cherundolo 30' (o.g.); Auer 52'		Hanke 47'	Stadium: rewirpowerSTADION; Attendance: 19,902; Referee: Peter Gagelmann (Bremen)

2 March 2008 22	VfL Bochum	2–0	Bayer Leverkusen	Bochum
17:00	Zdebel 66'; Dabrowski 88'			Stadium: rewirpowerSTADION; Attendance: 23,781; Referee: Jochen Drees (Münster-Sarmsheim)

8 March 2008 23	Eintracht Frankfurt	1–1	VfL Bochum	Frankfurt am Main
15:30	Toski 49'		Azaouagh 67'	Stadium: Commerzbank-Arena; Attendance: 46,700; Referee: Felix Brych (Munich)

15 March 2008 24	VfL Bochum	1–1	VfB Stuttgart	Bochum
15:30	Dabrowski 20'		Hitzlsperger 47'	Stadium: rewirpowerSTADION; Attendance: 25,086; Referee: Peter Sippel (Munich)

22 March 2008 25	1. FC Nürnberg	1–1	VfL Bochum	Nuremberg
15:30	Misimović 8'		Šesták 5'	Stadium: easyCredit-Stadion; Attendance: 43,547; Referee: Babak Rafati (Hannover)

29 March 2008 26	VfL Bochum	3–3	Borussia Dortmund	Bochum
15:30	Dabrowski 3'; Auer 9', 42'		Kehl 37'; Petrić 39'; Tinga 64'	Stadium: rewirpowerSTADION; Attendance: 31,328; Referee: Helmut Fleischer (Ulm)

6 April 2008 27	Bayern Munich	3–1	VfL Bochum	Munich
17:00	Lúcio 31'; Ribéry 74' (pen.); Lell 88'		Azaouagh 4'	Stadium: Allianz Arena; Attendance: 69,000; Referee: Michael Weiner (Giesen)

12 April 2008 28	VfL Bochum	1–1	Hertha BSC	Bochum
15:30	Yahia 42'		Skácel 28'	Stadium: rewirpowerSTADION; Attendance: 20,883; Referee: Felix Brych (Munich)

15 April 2008 29	VfL Wolfsburg	0–1	VfL Bochum	Wolfsburg
20:00			Šesták 88'	Stadium: Volkswagen Arena; Attendance: 18,101; Referee: Peter Gagelmann (Bremen)

26 April 2008 30	VfL Bochum	1–1	MSV Duisburg	Bochum
15:30	Šesták 84'		Niculescu 26'	Stadium: rewirpowerSTADION; Attendance: 24,339; Referee: Markus Merk (Otterbach)

3 May 2008 31	Arminia Bielefeld	2–0	VfL Bochum	Bielefeld
15:30	Mijatović 70'; Kamper 90'			Stadium: Schüco-Arena; Attendance: 23,800; Referee: Babak Rafati (Hannover)

6 May 2008 32	VfL Bochum	0–3	Schalke 04	Bochum
20:00			Asamoah 34'; Rakitić 67'; Bordon 85'	Stadium: rewirpowerSTADION; Attendance: 31,328; Referee: Knut Kircher (Rottenburg)

10 May 2008 33	Karlsruher SC	1–3	VfL Bochum	Karlsruhe
15:30	Eggimann 88'		Azaouagh 45'; Dabrowski 47'; Šesták 50'	Stadium: Wildparkstadion; Attendance: 27,920; Referee: Peter Gagelmann (Bremen)

17 May 2008 34	VfL Bochum	1–2	Hansa Rostock	Bochum
15:30	Mavraj 36'		Kern 40'; Bartels 77'	Stadium: rewirpowerSTADION; Attendance: 18,883; Referee: Manuel Gräfe (Berlin)

=== DFB-Pokal ===
5 August 2007 R1	Dynamo Dresden	0–1	VfL Bochum	Dresden
17:00			Grote 55'	Stadium: Rudolf-Harbig-Stadion; Attendance: 17,137; Referee: Peter Sippel (Munich)

30 October 2007 R2	Alemannia Aachen	3–2	VfL Bochum	Aachen
19:00	Milchraum 50'; Pecka 62'; Ebbers 81'		Ebbers 21' (o.g.); Drsek 83'	Stadium: Tivoli; Attendance: 17,838; Referee: Jochen Drees (Münster-Sarmsheim)

== Squad ==
=== Squad and statistics ===
==== Squad, appearances and goals scored ====
No.	Pos	Nat	Player	Total		Bundesliga		DFB-Pokal	
No.	Pos	Nat	Player	Apps	Goals	Apps	Goals	Apps	Goals
1	GK	(Germany) GER	Philipp Heerwagen	0	0	0	0	0	0
2	DF	(Sweden) SWE	Matias Concha	20	0	18	0	2	0
3	DF	(Germany) GER	Martin Meichelbeck	6	0	5	0	1	0
4	DF	(Germany) GER	Marcel Maltritz	33	2	31	2	2	0
5	MF	(Germany) GER	Christoph Dabrowski	30	5	28	5	2	0
6	DF	(Czech Republic) CZE	Pavel Drsek	13	1	12	0	1	1
7	FW	(Denmark) DEN	Tommy Bechmann	22	5	20	5	2	0
8	MF	(Poland) POL	Tomasz Zdebel	27	1	26	1	1	0
9	FW	(Slovakia) SVK	Stanislav Šesták	35	13	33	13	2	0
10	FW	(Cameroon) CMR	Joël Epalle	28	1	26	1	2	0
11	FW	(Poland) POL	Marcin Mięciel	27	4	25	4	2	0
13	MF	(Germany) GER	Danny Fuchs	18	1	17	1	1	0
14	FW	(Germany) GER	Benjamin Auer	18	5	17	5	1	0
15	MF	(Canada) CAN	Daniel Imhof	24	2	24	2	0	0
16	FW	(Austria) AUT	Marc Sand	0	0	0	0	0	0
17	MF	(Croatia) CRO	Ivo Iličević (until 31 December 2007)	7	0	6	0	1	0
17	FW	(Ukraine) UKR	Oleksiy Byelik (since 30 January 2008)	4	0	4	0	0	0
18	MF	(Germany) GER	Oliver Schröder	16	0	15	0	1	0
19	MF	(Germany) GER	Dennis Grote	20	2	18	1	2	1
20	DF	(Germany) GER	Mërgim Mavraj	2	1	2	1	0	0
21	DF	(France) FRA	Marc Pfertzel	29	0	28	0	1	0
22	MF	(Germany) GER	Mimoun Azaouagh (since 1 January 2008)	14	3	14	3	0	0
23	MF	(Japan) JPN	Shinji Ono (since 29 January 2008)	12	0	12	0	0	0
24	DF	(Germany) GER	Philipp Bönig	25	0	25	0	0	0
25	DF	(Algeria) ALG	Antar Yahia	35	2	33	2	2	0
26	MF	(Germany) GER	Heinrich Schmidtgal	0	0	0	0	0	0
27	GK	(Czech Republic) CZE	Jan Laštůvka	27	0	25	0	2	0
28	MF	(Germany) GER	David Zajas	0	0	0	0	0	0
30	DF	(Germany) GER	Patrick Fabian	0	0	0	0	0	0
31	GK	(Germany) GER	René Renno	10	0	10	0	0	0
35	MF	(Germany) GER	İlkay Gündoğan (since 1 January 2008)	0	0	0	0	0	0

=== Transfers ===
==== Summer ====
In:

No.	Pos.	Nation	Player
1	GK	(Germany) GER	Philipp Heerwagen (from SpVgg Unterhaching)
2	DF	(Sweden) SWE	Matias Concha (from Djurgårdens IF)
9	FW	(Slovakia) SVK	Stanislav Šesták (from MŠK Žilina)
11	FW	(Poland) POL	Marcin Mięciel (from PAOK)
13	MF	(Germany) GER	Danny Fuchs (from SpVgg Greuther Fürth)
14	FW	(Germany) GER	Benjamin Auer (loan return from 1. FC Kaiserslautern)
16	FW	(Austria) AUT	Marc Sand (from FC Kärnten)
20	DF	(Germany) GER	Mërgim Mavraj (from Darmstadt 98)
21	DF	(France) FRA	Marc Pfertzel (from Livorno)
25	DF	(Algeria) ALG	Antar Yahia (from Nice, previously on loan)
26	MF	(Germany) GER	Heinrich Schmidtgal (from SC Verl)
27	GK	(Czech Republic) CZE	Jan Laštůvka (on loan from Shakhtar Donetsk)
30	DF	(Germany) GER	Patrick Fabian (from VfL Bochum II)

Out:

No.	Pos.	Nation	Player
1	GK	(Denmark) DEN	Peter Skov-Jensen (to Sandefjord Fotball)
2	DF	(Germany) GER	Benjamin Lense (to Hansa Rostock)
9	FW	(Brazil) BRA	Fábio Júnior (to Hapoel Tel Aviv)
10	MF	(Germany) GER	Dariusz Wosz (retired)
11	FW	(Belgium) BEL	Joris Van Hout (to Westerlo)
16	MF	(Bosnia and Herzegovina) BIH	Zvjezdan Misimović (to 1. FC Nürnberg)
17	DF	(Germany) GER	Heiko Butscher (to SC Freiburg)
21	MF	(Czech Republic) CZE	Filip Trojan (to FC St. Pauli)
22	FW	(Greece) GRE	Theofanis Gekas (loan return to Panathinaikos)
23	MF	(Germany) GER	Ersan Tekkan (to Antalyaspor)
26	GK	(Germany) GER	Alexander Bade (to SC Paderborn)
27	DF	(Germany) GER	David Czyszczon (to Rot-Weiss Essen)
28	MF	(Germany) GER	Lucas Oppermann (to Wuppertaler SV)
29	FW	(Germany) GER	Sebastian Hille (to Borussia Dortmund II)
36	DF	(Switzerland) SUI	David Pallas (released)
45	GK	(Czech Republic) CZE	Jaroslav Drobný (loan return to Ipswich Town)

==== Winter ====
In:

No.	Pos.	Nation	Player
17	FW	(Ukraine) UKR	Oleksiy Byelik (on loan from Shakhtar Donetsk)
22	MF	(Germany) GER	Mimoun Azaouagh (on loan from Schalke 04)
23	MF	(Japan) JPN	Shinji Ono (from Urawa Red Diamonds)
35	MF	(Germany) GER	İlkay Gündoğan (from VfL Bochum U-19)

Out:

No.	Pos.	Nation	Player
17	MF	(Croatia) CRO	Ivo Iličević (on loan to SpVgg Greuther Fürth)

== VfL Bochum II ==
No.	Pos	Nat	Player	Total		Oberliga Westfalen	
No.	Pos	Nat	Player	Apps	Goals	Apps	Goals
	MF	(Germany) GER	Mirkan Aydın	14	2	14	2
	GK	(Germany) GER	David Buchholz	25	0	25	0
	DF	(Germany) GER	Jürgen Duah	31	3	31	3
	FW	(Germany) GER	Sami El-Nounou	32	26	32	26
	DF	(Germany) GER	Patrick Fabian	31	0	31	0
	MF	(Germany) GER	Dennis Grote	6	0	6	0
	FW	(Turkey) TUR	Dilaver Güçlü	32	6	32	6
	DF	(Germany) GER	Thiemo Höhn	14	0	14	0
	MF	(Croatia) CRO	Ivo Iličević	4	2	4	2
	DF	(Germany) GER	Christian Kalina	8	0	8	0
	DF	(Germany) GER	Daniel Klinger	27	4	27	4
	GK	(Germany) GER	Andreas Luthe	8	0	8	0
	MF	(Germany) GER	Martin Lyttek	6	0	6	0
	DF	(Germany) GER	Mërgim Mavraj	7	1	7	1
	DF	(Germany) GER	Martin Meichelbeck	1	0	1	0
	DF	(Germany) GER	Marc-Andre Nimptsch	26	1	26	1
	FW	(Germany) GER	Marko Onucka	9	0	9	0
	DF	(Germany) GER	Oliver Rademacher	4	0	4	0
	GK	(Germany) GER	René Renno	2	0	2	0
	FW	(Austria) AUT	Marc Sand	16	0	16	0
	MF	(Germany) GER	Heinrich Schmidtgal	30	4	30	4
	DF	(Germany) GER	Lukas Schmitz	13	2	13	2
	DF	(Germany) GER	Rouven Schröder	31	0	31	0
	FW	(Turkey) TUR	Suri Ucar	18	2	18	2
	MF	(Germany) GER	Sebastian Westerhoff	12	5	12	5
	MF	(Germany) GER	Kevin Wölk	26	2	26	2
	MF	(Germany) GER	Dennis Yilmaz	3	1	3	1
	MF	(Germany) GER	David Zajas	32	0	32	0
	MF	(Canada) CAN	Gianluca Zavarise	2	0	2	0
