= Wesseler (Altenberge) =

German agricultural machine company

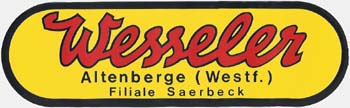
- Logo of the Wesseler branch office in Saerbeck
- Trade name: Wesseler, Feldmeister, Vewema
- Industry: Agricultural
- Founded: 1879
- Founder: Bernhard Wesseler
- Defunct: 4 February 1988
- Headquarters: Altenberge, Westfalia
- Area served: Westfalia, Netherlands, Belgium
- Products: Farm Machinery, Household Appliances
- Number of employees: 120 (1960)

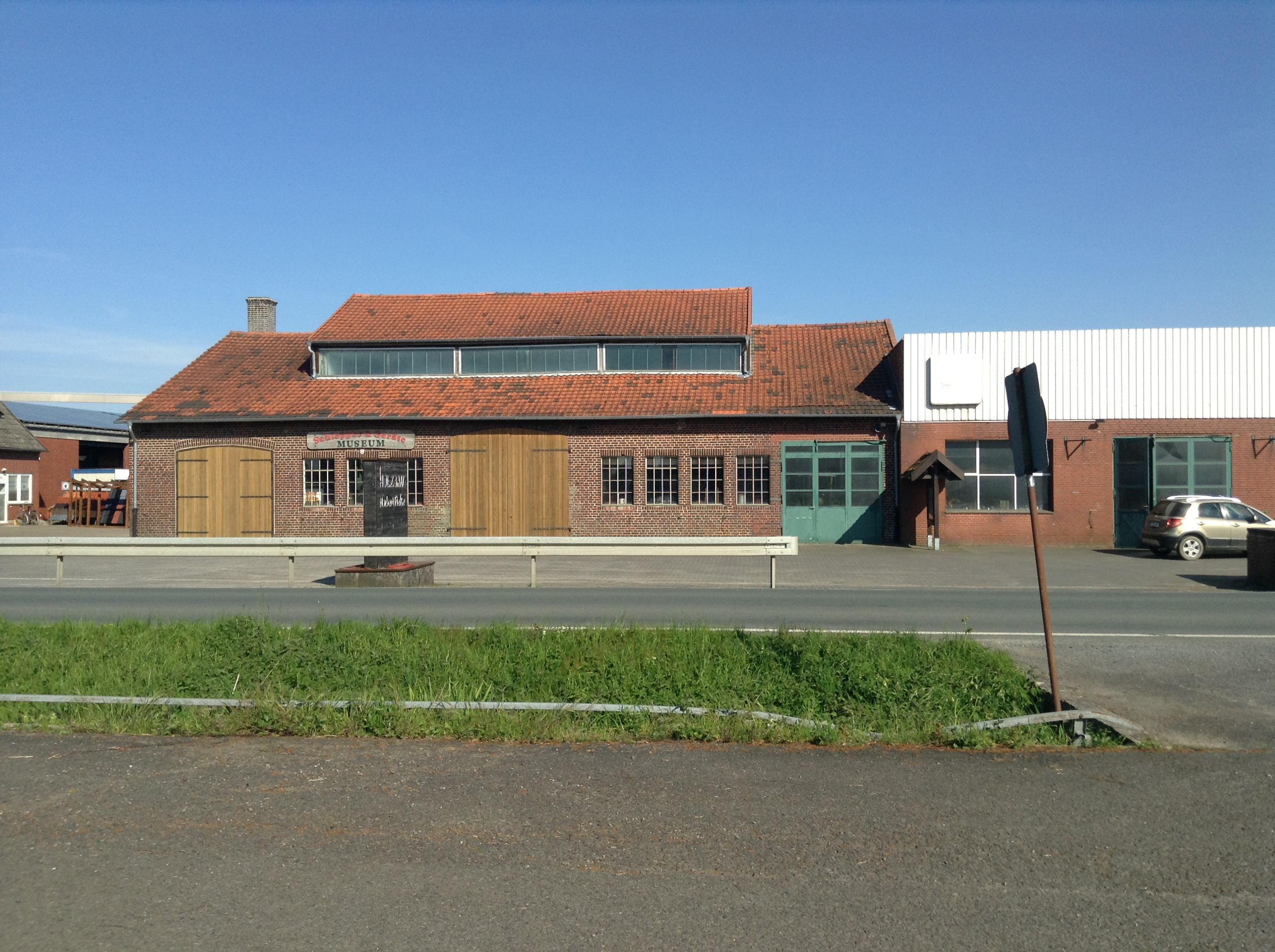
Wesseler plant in Altenberge, 2016

Wesseler (German pronunciation: [ˈvɛsl̩ɐ]) was a German company from Altenberge that manufactured, repaired and sold agricultural machines. It was founded in the 19th century as a smithy that specialised in agricultural products in the 1930s. During the agricultural industrialisation in Germany after the Second World War, the H. Wesseler oHG became a major tractor company in NRW. Between 1936 and 1966, Wesseler produced approximately 3600 tractors. In Germany, the brand name Wesseler was used, while Wesseler tractors sold in the Netherlands and Belgium were named Feldmeister and Vewema. In the second half of the 1960s, when the demand for tractors diminished, Wesseler, later known as the H. Wesseler KG, stopped the tractor production and specialised in selling and repairing Fiatagri tractors until they registered as insolvent in 1988.

== History ==
=== Beginning – Monetary reform ===
In 1879, Bernhard Wesseler from Darup purchased a building with surrounding land in the heath of Kümper near Altenberge. He became a farmer and opened a smithy. It was expanded for the first time in 1909. Wesselers son Heinrich joined the company in 1911 or 1912, (Note: This remains unclear. Some sources claim 1911, (Landwirtschaftliches Wochenblatt Westfalen/Lippe No. 33. 16 August 1990. Page 33), (Franz Sundorf: Wesseler-Chronik. 2016. Page 60), while others claim 1912. (1936 Schlepperbau begonnen – in Westfälische Nachrichten, 1966; page 1), (100 Jahre Wesseler Landtechnik, 1979; page 86)) and started repairing and selling agricultural machines. Until 1936, the company Schmitz was the most important competitor. In the same year, Wesseler bought all the agricultural machine parts from Schmitz; Schmitz has been focussing on manufacturing trailers since then. 12 employees worked for Wesseler in 1936, the first tractor prototype was built in the same year. It had a ladder frame and a hopper-cooled engine. This prototype was improved and Wesseler showed it to the public in 1938. No more than 20 tractors of this type were produced until 1940. Today, no pre-war Wesseler tractors exist anymore. Before the Second World War, Wesseler was still a company specialised in smithy tasks rather than a tractor manufacturer, so that a new forge was built in 1939.

During the Second World War, some Wesseler employees were conscripted, the tractor production was halted. Wesseler also used forced labour, two polish workers had to work in the plant. In the early war years, the company mainly repaired bicycles. Caused by the war, neither fuel nor production material was available, so that old military trucks and wood gas motors had to be used to produce new tractors in the first post war years. The regular tractor production using the frameless block construction method began after the monetary reform in West Germany in 1948. At this time, Wesseler had 10 employees.

=== Economical upswing during the tractor demand period ===
The economical upswing of Wesseler began with the monetary reform. Wesseler gained profit from the huge tractor demand in Germany in the 1950s. The sons of Heinrich Wesseler, Ludger and Paul already worked for the company back then. At first it was planned to turn Wesseler into a Fahr dealer, due to Fahr supply problems, Wesseler also sold tractors of other brands such as Normag and Schlüter. Wesseler also sold their own tractors. Later, Wesseler became an important Claas dealer and focused on producing their own tractors. In 1952, a tractor workshop was built, it was increased in size in 1959. However, Wesseler still manufactured other goods such as tableware. A BP petrol station was a part of the Wesseler plant.

An important occurrence was the DLG-show 1949 in Frankfurt, where the first MWM diesel engine was bought. Before the tractors were fitted with MWM engines, Wesseler used Deutz engines, which had a bad durability due to bad lubrication oil quality. MWM engines could also use the bad lubrication oil, they became the standard diesel engines of Wesseler tractors; starting in 1953, Wesseler offered every tractor type with a water-cooled and an air-cooled MWM engine of the same power output. Prometheus gearboxes were used first, later, Wesseler switched to ZF gearboxes. Those used to be progressive in the 1950s as well as the direct injection MWM diesel engines.

Soon, Wesseler became an exhibitor at several fairs in Germany. A Wesseler dealer network was established, the main distribution areas were the regions around Münster in Westfalen and Oldenburg, the Netherlands, Belgium and Luxembourg. For the Dutch market, Wesseler tractors got an orange painting and the brand name Feldmeister. Primarily, 20 PS tractors were sold in the Netherlands. 800 Feldmeister were sold until 1967. The Belgian market demanded more powerful tractors. In the viniculture regions Eifel and Mosel some one-cylinder narrow gauge models with up to 15 PS were sold, some tractors even made it to Hesse and France.

=== Zenith and fall ===
In 1958, Wesseler had 60 employees which worked in a two-shift-system. This number soon reached 80 and in 1960, Wesseler had 120 employees. Most employees were from Altenberge and the surrounding areas, some also came from the Netherlands and Belgium. In the early 1950s, some employees built houses next to the Wesseler plant, Wesseler themselves also built houses there for their employees in 1962. When Wesseler was at the economical zenith in the second half of the 1950s, one tractor left the plant per day. At first, Wesseler kept up with trends such as the equipment carrier tractor (Note: A Geräteträger, literal translation: Equipment carrier, is a special kind of tractor that has a frame. This makes it possible to attach devices underneath or on top of the tractor.) but they did not invest in new production machines for the plant. This led to an expensive production which could not compete with the inexpensive production of other tractor manufacturers. Wessler had to register as insolvent, the production was stopped in 1966, when Wesseler had 70 employees. The last tractor, a WL 222 was sold in June 1967. During three decades, 3600 tractors had been produced which makes Wesseler the fourth-largest tractor manufacturer of NRW.

Before the registration of insolvency, Wesseler already tried to change the concept of the company in late 1965. Paul Wesseler wanted to stop the tractor production and form Wesseler into a Fiat dealer. This happened in 1967, when Wesseler became the H. Wesseler KG. The company soon became important for the region again as a Fiat dealer, a new tractor workshop was built in 1973, and expanded in 1982. Wesseler was the second-largest Fiat dealer in Germany. At the end of the 1980s, Wesseler had to face major problems: A huge and expensive spares store and too many employees. In February 1988, Wesseler had to register als insolvent again. So far, 2000 Fiat tractors had been sold. After the suspension of the insolvency proceedings, a newly founded agricultural machine company rented the Wesseler plant in 1995. It moved to a new building in 2003. Since 2004, the tractor museum of Altenberge has been renting the Wesseler plant, which has been an LWL memorial since 2010. The Wesseler factory was sold by the owner family to a private investor in 2017. The association then had to liquidate the museum inventory. The association has now rented the former forge and exhibited some Wesseler tractors.

== Distribution ==
=== Brand names ===
In Germany, Wesseler tractors were sold as Wessler and Wesseler Ackermeister. In the Netherlands and Belgium, mainly the brand name Feldmeister was used, about 800 Feldmeister were sold. In Belgium the brand names Ackermeister and Wesseler-Benz were used as well. In the Netherlands, the brand names Vewema and Westfalia were also used. The name depended on the local Wesseler importer.

=== Wesseler dealers ===
In Germany, Wesseler tractors were sold for DM 5.000 up to DM 10.000, depending on the model and power of the tractor. Wesseler had a branch office in Saerbeck since 1966. Some of the external Wesseler traders were these:

- Hausberger in Trier / Germany
- Wirtz in Gangelt / Germany
- Weitz in Linnich / Germany
- Goudland Tractorploegenfabriek in Echt / Netherlands
- Roefs’ Machinenhandel in Venlo / Netherlands, brand name Westfalia
- Vewema N.V. in Gorinchem / Netherlands, brand name Vewema
- Etienne Decaupere Landbouwmachienenfabrik in Lichtervelde / Belgium, brand name Feldmeister and Wesseler, until 1954
- Vanderpere in Lichtervelde / Belgium, brand name Wesseler-Benz, since 1954
- Gebr. Timmermans P.V.B.A. in Tielt / Belgium, brand name Ackermeister
- Coöp. Centrale Vereinigung Landbouwbelang G.A. in Roermond / Netherlands, the following tractors were sold with the brand name Feldmeister:

- 12 PS for DM 4.295
- 18 PS for DM 5.045
- 24 PS for DM 5.990
- 28 PS for DM 7.085
- 36 PS for DM 8.010
- 40 PS for DM 10.250

== Tractor production ==
In the late 1930s, Wesseler built not more than 20 tractors with a ladder frame and hopper-cooled engine, the rated power was used as the model name. This system was kept until the mid-1950s. Wesseler bought engines and gearboxes from other companies, while the rest of the tractor parts such as axles, bearings, hydraulics, hoods, wings and fuel tanks were produced in the Wesseler plant. The customers had to order the tractors first before they were produced, later, customers could purchase already produced tractors. Wesseler tractors had many standard fittings such as starter motors and lead-acid batteries, the customers could also order a lot of extra accessories like front loaders, three-point linkages, roofs and foldable headlights. The Dutch Wessler dealer C. C. V. Landbouwbelang G.A on the other hand ordered tractors without lead-acid batteries. Tractors with rated power outputs of 12 PS (9 kW; 12 hp) up to 60 PS (44 kW; 59 hp) were produced. Wesseler never used mass production, also neither plans nor mechanical drawings were used to build the tractors. No applies for patents were made. Today, around 300 Wesseler are registered as street-legal vehicles in Germany.

== Tractor types ==
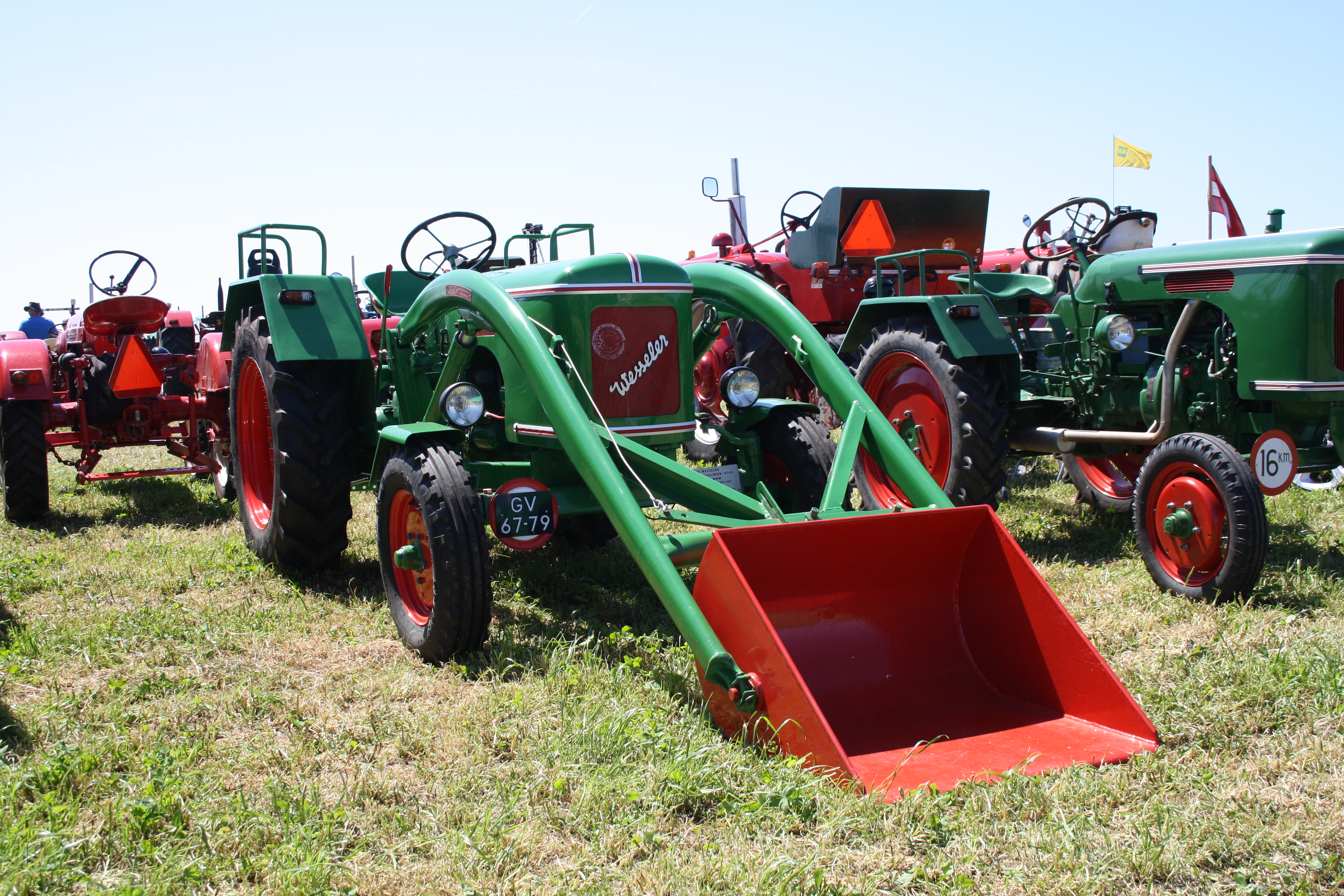
Wesseler (built 1964) with a front end loader attachment

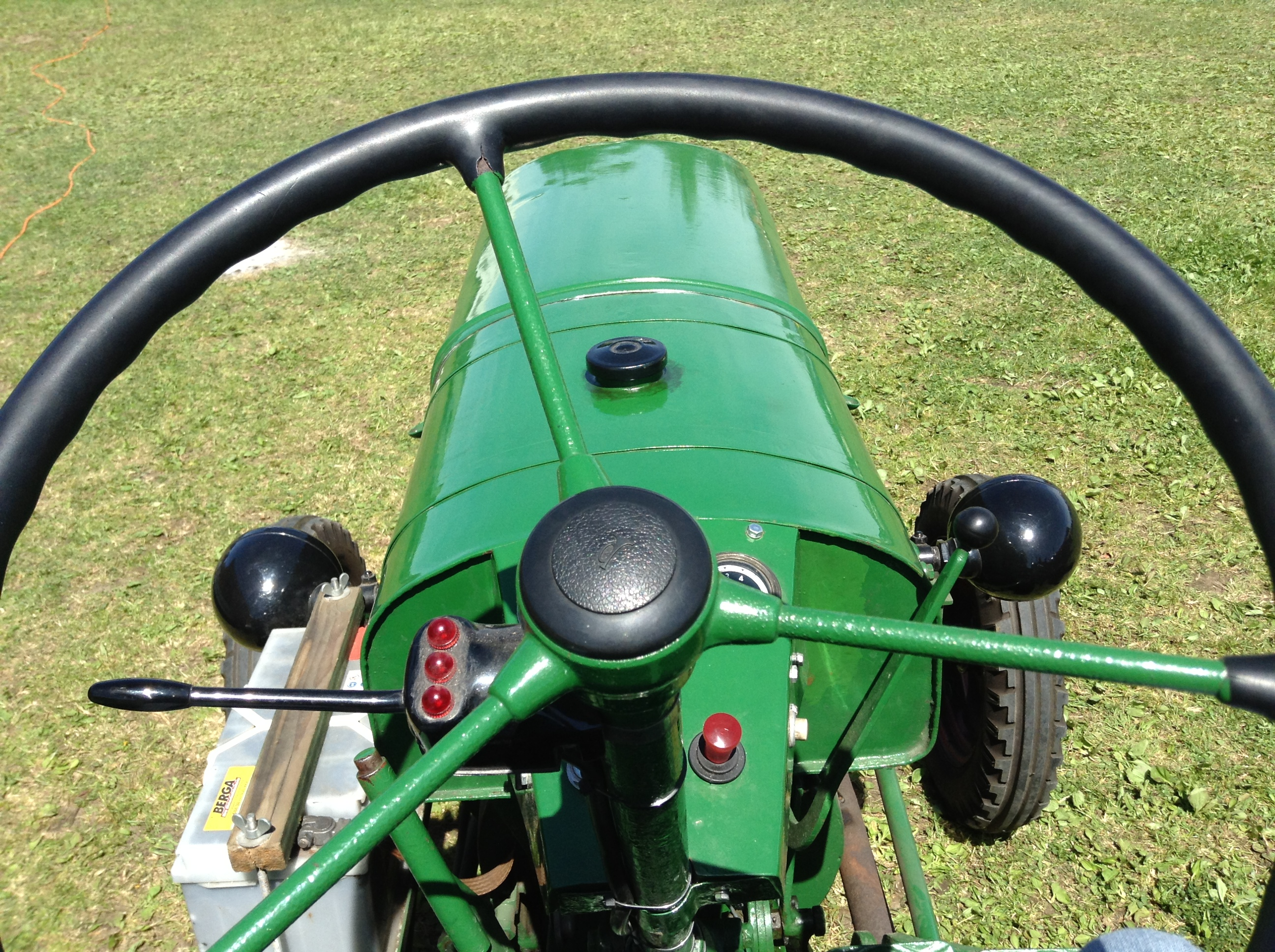
Wesseler WL 24 built in 1955

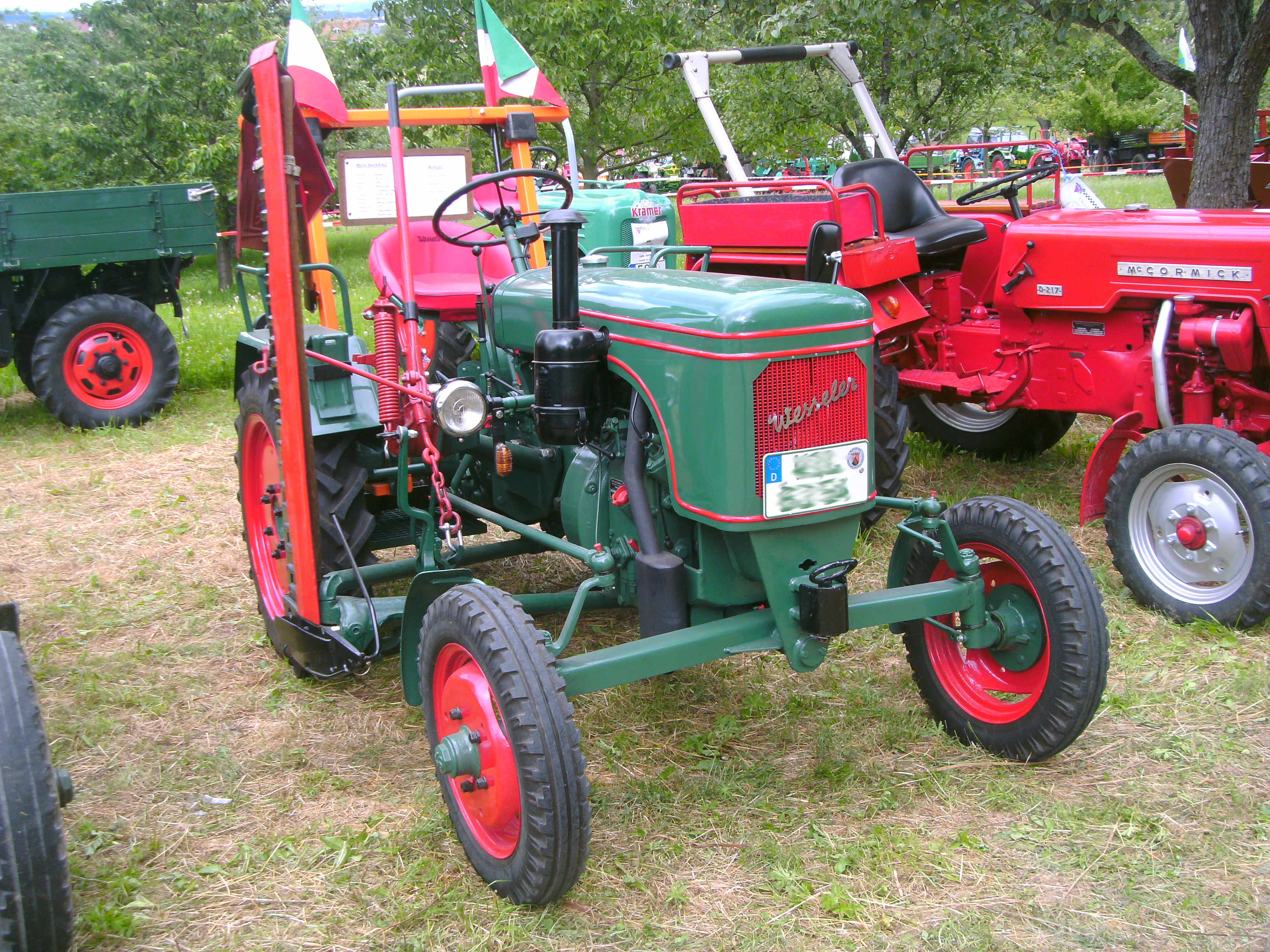
Wesseler WL 12

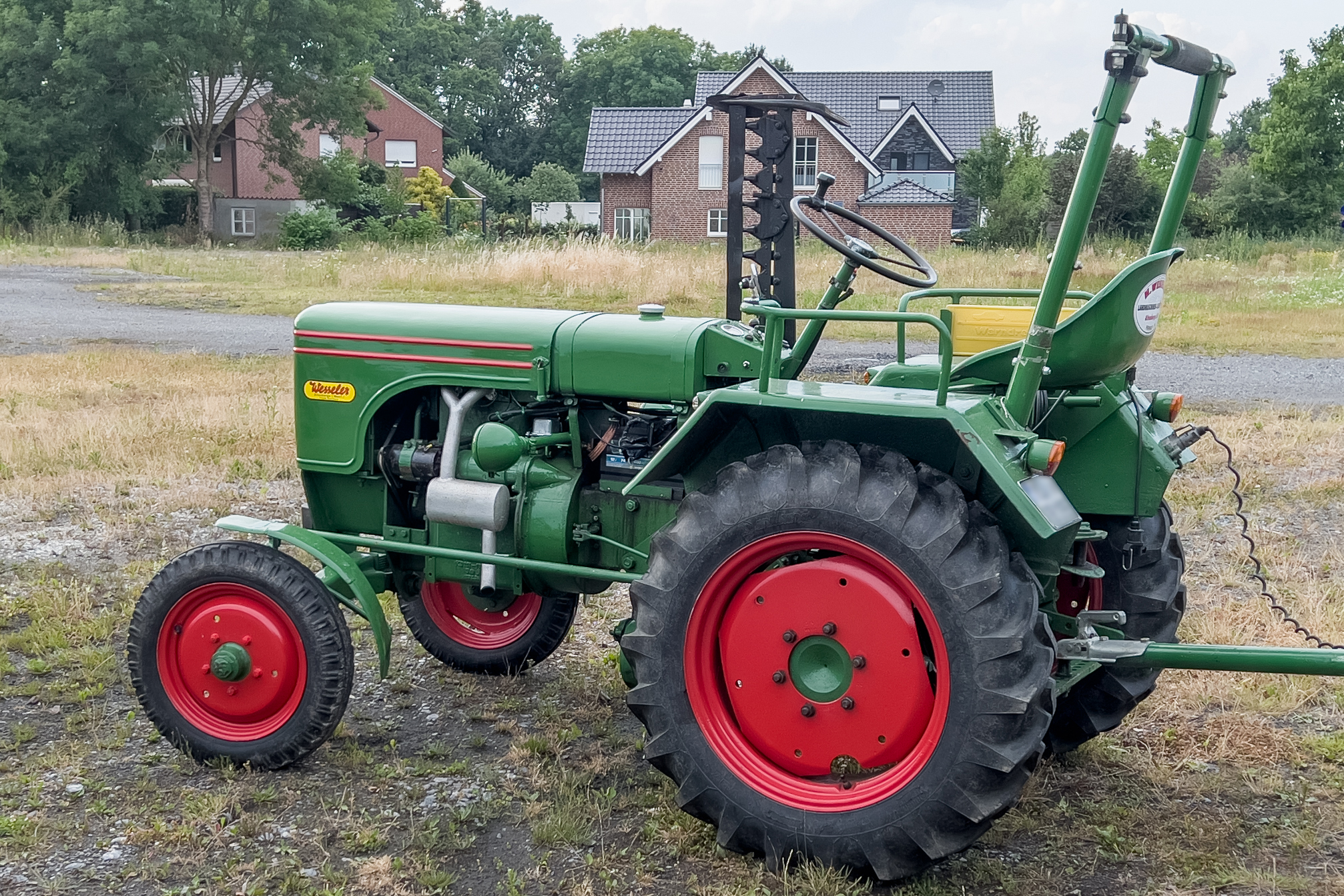
Wesseler W 17 built in 1955

The type namings were made depending on the PS-number (Note: In Germany, PS was used as the unit for power in until the 1970s. It is an abbreviation for Pferdestärke, which means horsepower. However, 1 PS does not equal 1 hp as the definitions are different.) as described above first. Starting in 1953, a W was put into the type name for Wesseler wassergekühlt (water-cooled). Air-cooled models were given the letters WL for Wesseler luftgekühlt (air-cooled). Equipment carrier tractors got the type code WLG for Wesseler luftgekühlt Geräteträger (air-cooled equipment carrier), narrow gauge models have the name WLS Wesseler luftgekühlt schmalspur (air-cooled narrow gauge). The PS-number followed the letters. Some extra letters were used to mark extras: H was used for Hochradschlepper; (Note: A Hochradschlepper, literal translation: High wheel tractor, is a special kind of tractor that has wheels with a large diameter. This gives the tractor a good ground clearance.) this means that the diameter of the wheels is larger than the diameter of standard wheels. L marks long wheelbase models, E stands for Extra version. Some models have a three-digit PS-number. In this case, the first digit reflects the cylinder amount of the engine while the last two digits resemble the power output of the engine. This three-digit system was used for later models with newer engines.

Example of the Wesseler tractors types

- W 17 (water-cooled, 17 PS)
- W 12 E (water-cooled, 12 PS, extra version)
- W 12 H (water-cooled, 12 PS, large wheel diameter version)
- WL 12 (air-cooled, 12 PS)
- WLG 12 (air-cooled equipment carrier tractor, 12 PS)
- WLS 12 (air-cooled narrow gauge tractor, 12 PS)

== Paintwork ==
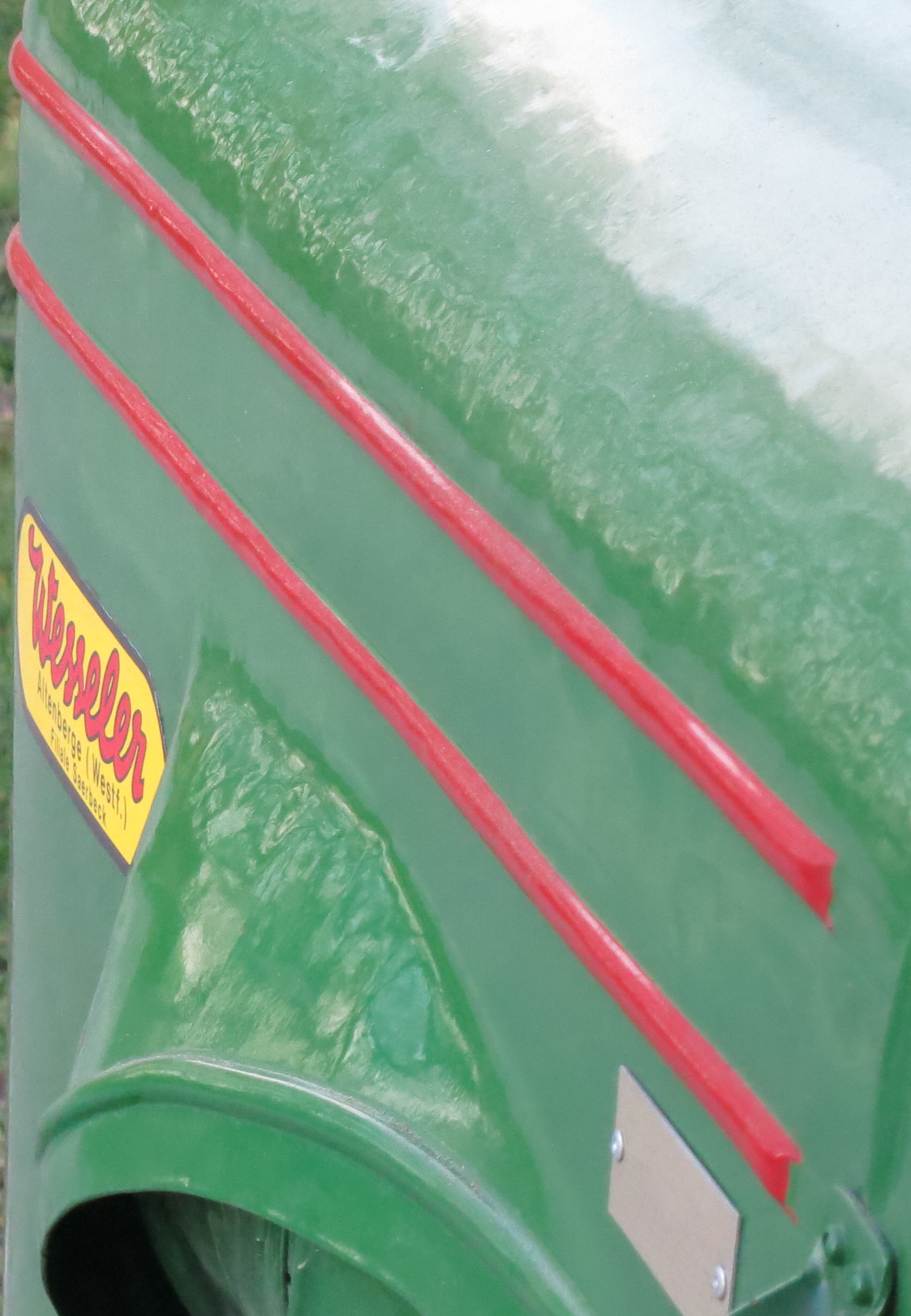
Paintwork of a Wesseler

Until 1953, Wesseler tractors sold under the Wesseler brand had a blue-grey painting with red rims and decorative stripes. From 1954, a leaf-green painting was used, and the red rim and decorative stripes colour was kept. Vewema tractors were painted in gentian blue; Feldmeisters had an orange painting. Wesseler used nitrocellulose lacquers. (Note: Holthaus: ″(...) und wenn man nach Hause kam, musste man sich erstmal duschen, wenns noch ging natürlich, wir hatten wohl ne Mütze auf, aber die Farbe war ja nicht so wie heute, heute ist das alles wasserverdünnte Farbe, ne? Früher war das alles Nitro, da hat man am Sonntag noch nach gestunken.″ – English translation: ″(...) and when you got home, you had to take a shower first, if it was still possible, we had hats though, but the paintwork was not like it is today, today it's a water-based paintwork, you know? Back in the day it was all nitro, you still stunk of that on sunday.″ In Lokalzeit Münsterland (YouTube))

Wesseler brand name, until 1953
| Main colour: grey-blue | Rim colour: fire-red |

Wesseler brand name, starting from 1954
| Main colour: leaf-green | Rim colour: fire-red |

Feldmeister brand name
| Main colour: blood-orange | Rim colour: golden-yellow |

Feldmeister brand name
| Main colour: clean-orange | Rim colour: zink-yellow |

Vewema brand name
| Main colour: gentian-blue | Rim colour: fire-red |

== Bibliography ==
- Westfalenland in Wesseler-Hand. – Kaum bekannt: Schlepper aus Altenberge. (Firmen-Geschichte) In: Schlepper Post, No. 6/2005.
- Franz Sundorf: Wesseler-Chronik. 2016
