= W17 =

W17 or W-17 may refer to:

- British NVC community W17, a woodland community in the British National Vegetation Classification system
- Hansa-Brandenburg W.17, a German flying boat fighter
- Mercedes-Benz 120, a prototype rear-engined car
- Snub cube
- Water-jugs-in-stand (hieroglyph), an Egyptian hieroglyph
- Watkins 17, an American sailboat design
- Wesseler W 17, an agricultural tractor
- Williams W-17 Stinger, an American racing aircraft
- W17 Trimaran An 17ft high performance Trimaran Designed by Mike Walters.
