= Mahmut Sönmez =

Turkish-Dutch footballer

Personal information
- Full name: Mahmut Sönmez
- Date of birth: January 25, 1990 (age 36)
- Place of birth: Rotterdam, Netherlands
- Height: 1.72 m (5 ft 8 in)
- Position: Winger

Youth career
- Feyenoord
- –2012: Leonidas

Senior career*
Years	Team	Apps	(Gls)
2012–2013	Preußen Münster	3	(0)
2013–2014	Leonidas	28	(5)
2014–2016	BVV Barendrecht	55	(8)
2016–2018	Kozakken Boys	53	(1)
2018	Kırşehir Belediyespor	7	(0)
2019–2020	RVVH		
2020	IFC Ambacht		
- * Club domestic league appearances and goals as of 29 November 2020

Mahmut Sönmez (born January 25, 1990) is a Turkish-Dutch footballer who plays as a winger. Sönmez began his professional career with Preußen Münster, whom he joined in July 2012, having previously played amateur football in his hometown of Rotterdam. He made his 3. Liga debut a month later, as a substitute for Rico Schmider in a 2–1 defeat to SV Darmstadt 98. He left Münster after one season and three appearances.
