= Setzin =

- Ortsteil of Toddin
- Interactive map of Setzin
- Location within Germany Location within Mecklenburg-Vorpommern
- Coordinates: 53°24′N 11°05′E
- Country: Germany
- State: Mecklenburg-Vorpommern
- District: Ludwigslust-Parchim
- Municipality: Toddin
- Subdivisions: 5

Area
  - Total: 20.60 km^{2} (7.95 sq mi)
- Elevation: 47 m (154 ft)

Population (2017-12-31)
  - Total: 465
  - Density: 22.6/km^{2} (58.5/sq mi)
- Time zone: UTC+01:00 (CET)
  - Summer (DST): UTC+02:00 (CEST)
- Postal codes: 19230
- Dialling codes: 03883, 038856
- Vehicle registration: LWL
- Website: www.amt-hagenow-land.de

Setzin is a village and a former municipality in the Ludwigslust-Parchim district, in Mecklenburg-Vorpommern, Germany. Since May 2019, it is part of the municipality Toddin.
