= Altenberge =

- Municipality
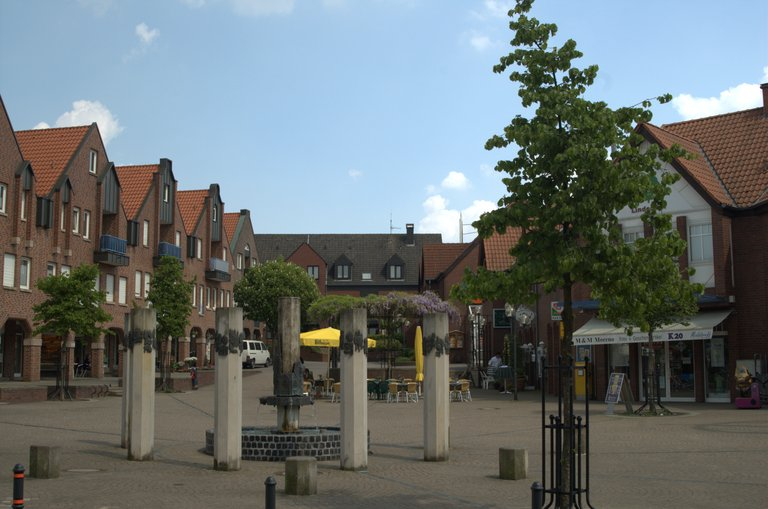
- Market square in Altenberge

- Coat of arms

- Location of Altenberge within Steinfurt district
- Interactive map of Altenberge
- Location within Germany Location within North Rhine-Westphalia
- Coordinates: 52°02′45″N 7°27′55″E
- Country: Germany
- State: North Rhine-Westphalia
- Admin. region: Münster
- District: Steinfurt

Government
  - Mayor (2025–30): Jan Röschenkämper (CDU)

Area
  - Total: 62.96 km^{2} (24.31 sq mi)
- Elevation: 79 m (259 ft)

Population (2025-12-31)
  - Total: 10,313
  - Density: 163.8/km^{2} (424.2/sq mi)
- Time zone: UTC+01:00 (CET)
  - Summer (DST): UTC+02:00 (CEST)
- Postal codes: 48341
- Dialling codes: 02505
- Vehicle registration: ST, BF, TE
- Website: www.altenberge.de

Altenberge (Westphalian: Ollenbiärg) is a municipality in the district of Steinfurt, in North Rhine-Westphalia, Germany. It is situated approximately 15 km south-east of Steinfurt and 15 km north-west of Münster.

== Population ==
Historical population

Year	Pop.	±% p.a.
1965	5,261	—
1970	5,905	+2.34%
1975	6,602	+2.26%
1980	7,259	+1.92%
1985	7,567	+0.83%
1990	7,852	+0.74%
1995	8,445	+1.47%

Year	Pop.	±% p.a.
2000	9,521	+2.43%
2005	10,013	+1.01%
2010	10,248	+0.47%
2015	10,315	+0.13%
2020	10,406	+0.18%
2025	10,313	−0.18%

Source: Landesdatabank Nordrhein-Westfalen

== Politics ==
The current mayor is Jan Röschenkämper of the CDU who was elected with 65,3 % of the vote during the 2025 local elections.

=== City coucil ===
After the 2025 elections, the Altenberge city council is composed as follows:

Party	Votes	%	+/-	Seats	+/-
Christian Democratic Union (CDU)	3,078	50.7	▲14.0	14	▲5
Alliance 90/The Greens (Grüne)	1,588	26.1	▼7.8	6	▼3
Social Democratic Party (SPD)	900	14.8	▼0.5	4	±0
Free Democratic Party (FDP)	508	8.4	▼5.7	2	▼2
Valid votes	6,074	97.8			
Invalid votes	137	2.2			
Total	6,211	100.0		26	±0
Electorate/voter turnout	8,386	74.1			
Source: City of Altenberge

== Economy ==
=== Transport ===
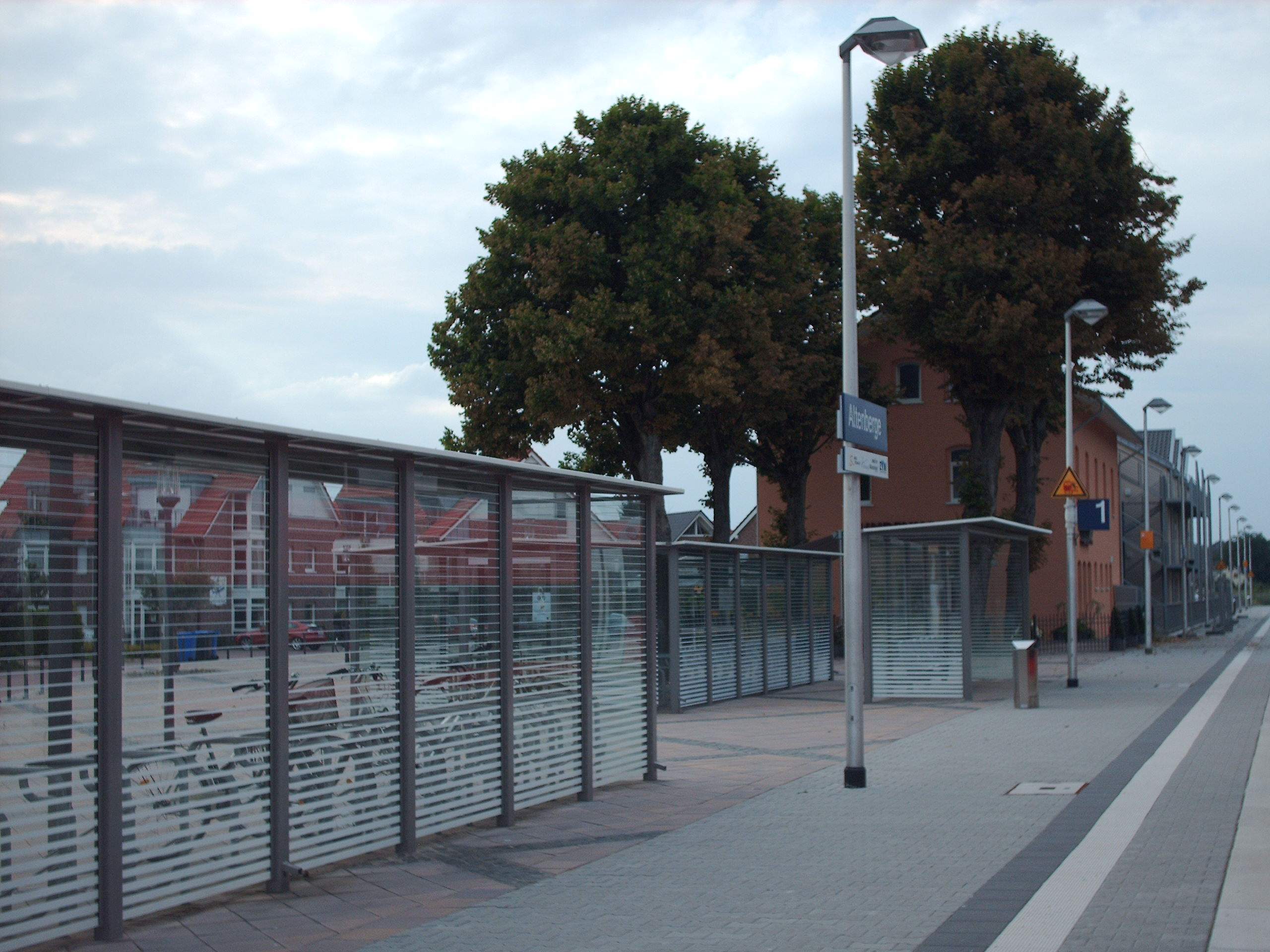
Altenberge train station

Altenberge station is served by the trains of line RB64 (Münster–Enschede railway) from Muenster to Enschede, Altenberge is connected to the local bus network as well and located in the area of the fare association Westfalen-Tarif.

=== Industry ===
The machine manufacturers Schmitz and Wesseler were founded in Altenberge.

== Personalities ==
- Hans Blumenberg (1920-1996) German philosopher
- Herbert Vorgrimler (1929-2014) Catholic theologian and author
- Theresia Degener (born 1961), law professor in Bochum and one of the most important German activists for the rights of people with disabilities
- Pascal Koopmann (born 1990), footballer
