= Schmitz Cargobull =

German truck manufacturer

Schmitz Cargobull AG
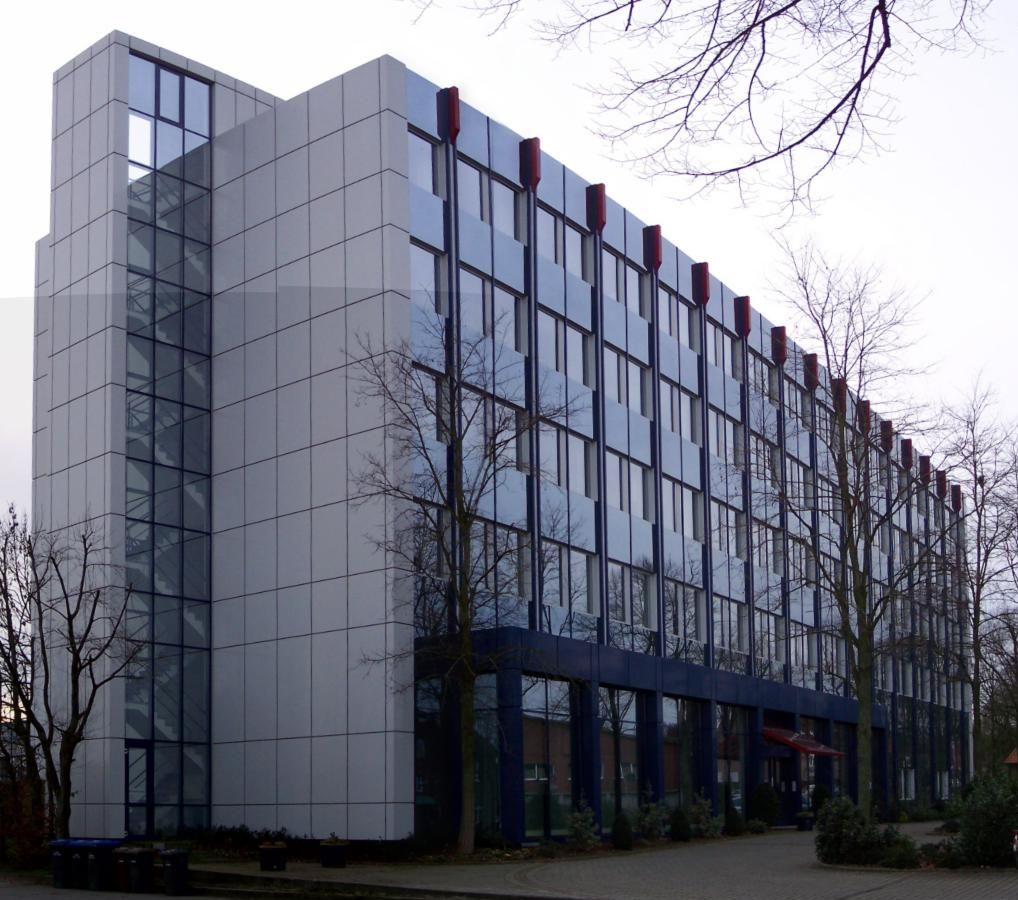
- Schmitz Cargobull Headquarters in Horstmar
- Company type: Aktiengesellschaft
- Founded: 1892
- Headquarters: Horstmar, Germany
- Area served: Worldwide
- Key people: Andreas Schmitz (Chairman of the Management Board); Dirk Hoffmann (Chairman of the Supervisory Board)
- Products: Trailers, refrigerated trailers, semi-trailers, box bodies, skellies, tippers
- Revenue: €2.290 billion (business year 2018/2019)
- Number of employees: 6,500 (Business Year 2018/2019)
- Website: www.cargobull.com/en

Schmitz Cargobull AG is a German manufacturer of semi-trailers, trailers and truck bodies. The company's head office is located in Horstmar, Germany, and its registered office is in the neighbouring city of Altenberge in the state of North Rhine-Westphalia. The family-owned company had 6,500 employees in the 2018/2019 business year and generated a turnover of 2.290 billion euros. It is thus the market leader in Europe. The families of Dr. Heinz Schmitz, Peter Schmitz and Bernd Hoffmann hold equal shares in the company.

== Company history ==
=== Founding and expansion ===
The company has its origins in the year 1892. The company's founder, Heinrich Schmitz, began to construct wagons at the family's forge located in Altenberge near Münster. The forge's new business first began to gain headway at the end of the 1920s as a result of increasing motorisation. During this time the company transformed from a craftsman's business into an industrial vehicle manufacturer. The first motor vehicle trailer equipped with solid rubber tyres was delivered in 1928. From 1935 onward semi-trailers and box vehicles with a steel exterior on a wooden frame were manufactured. In 1950 Schmitz Cargobull produced its first insulated and refrigerated body.

=== Expansion, crises and reorientation ===
The company continued to expand during the 1960s and especially after the first oil crisis at the beginning of the 1970s when large-scale orders from the Near East increased the speed of the company's growth. The beginning of the Iran–Iraq War put an end to the orders from Arabian countries in the 1980s and Schmitz Cargobull underwent a crisis.

The political reforms in Eastern Europe and the German Reunification provided the company with new momentum until the company experienced another decline in orders in the middle of the 1990s. This resulted in a rigorous transformation of the production: The product range was restricted to 4 basic types, the number of required parts heavily reduced, the production and delivery times shortened and the labour cost ratio reduced.

In March 1999 the company's stock market launch was withdrawn due to poor demand for the shares. Since then no further plans for another stock market launch have been made. In the 2004/2005 business year Schmitz Cargobull declared a turnover of more than 1 billion euros (1.21 bil euros, 36,000 vehicles produced) for the first time. The turnover had doubled within five years and 1,500 new employees had been hired.

=== Current business development ===
In the 2007/2008 business year the company achieved a turnover of more than 2 billion euros (2.14 bil euros, 66,500 vehicles produced) for the first time. The level of incoming orders decreased drastically as a result of the financial crisis. The turnover for the 2009/2010 business year decreased by 70% to 660 million euros (12,800 vehicles produced). Yet in the 2010/2011 business yearly turnover once again exceeded the billion threshold and is currently 1.5 billion euros. In November 2012 a joint-venture contract was signed with the Chinese Dongfeng Motor Company, Ltd. The collaboration intends to produce semi-trailers for the Chinese market. In April 2013 Schmitz Cargobull announced its plans to open a new production facility in Russia to the south of St Petersburg. In April 2024, the company took over the industrial vehicle production part of the Belgian bus manufacturer Van Hool, which had been declared bankrupt.

== Products and services ==
Schmitz Cargobull's product range consists of:

- Boxer semi-trailers for dry and refrigerated freight
- Flatbed semi-trailers and curtainsider semi-trailers for packaged goods, steel, paper and beverages
- Tipper semi-trailers for bulk goods for the construction and agricultural sectors
- Semi-trailer container chassis
- Trailers and bodies

Schmitz Cargobull offers the following services through its subsidiaries:

- Schmitz Cargobull Finance: Leasing and hire-purchase
- Schmitz Cargobull Parts & Services: Spare parts and services
- Schmitz Cargobull Telematics: Trailer telematics and data services
- Schmitz Cargobull Trailer Stores: Used-vehicle purchasing and sales
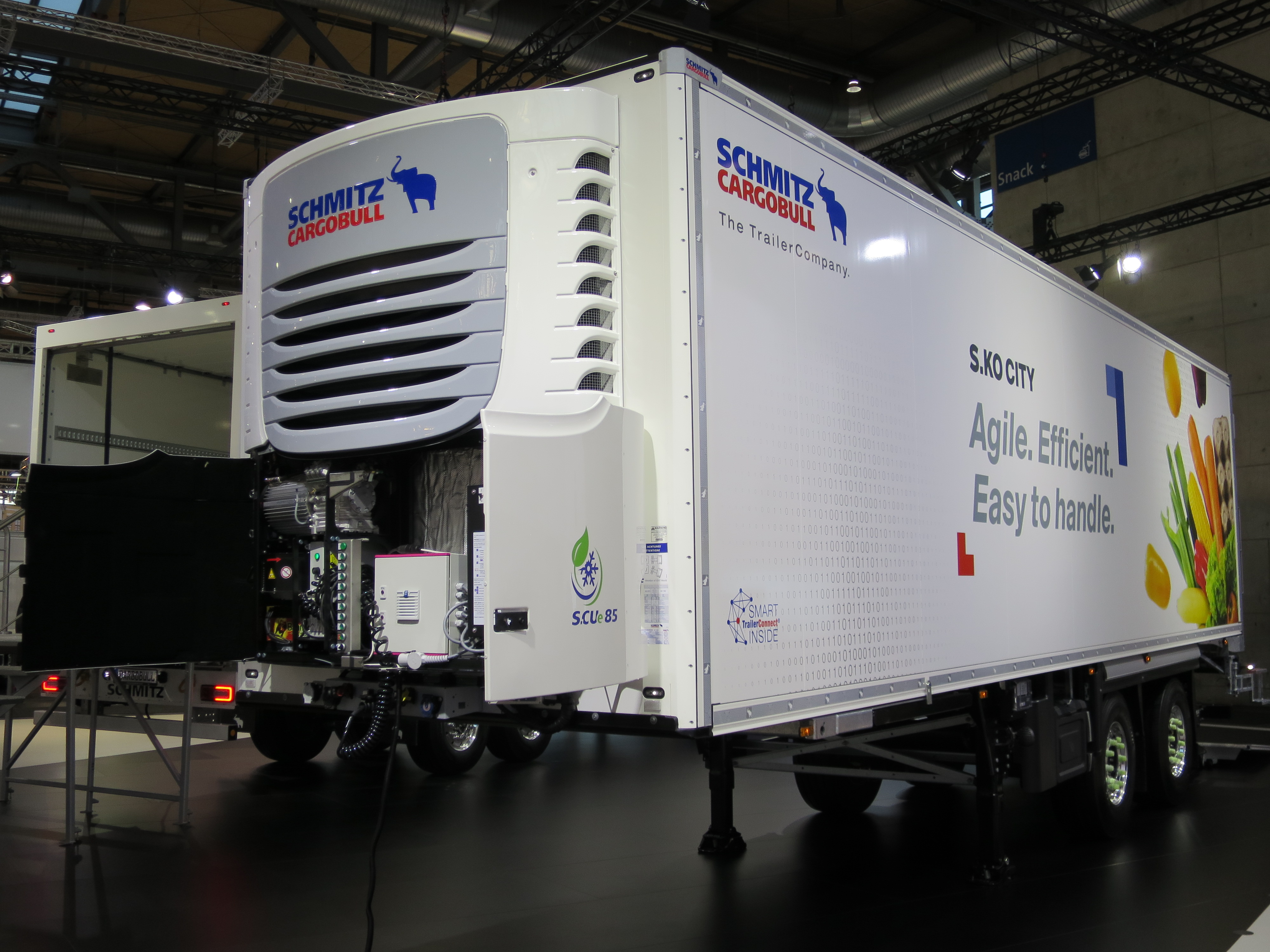
Refrigerated semi-trailer

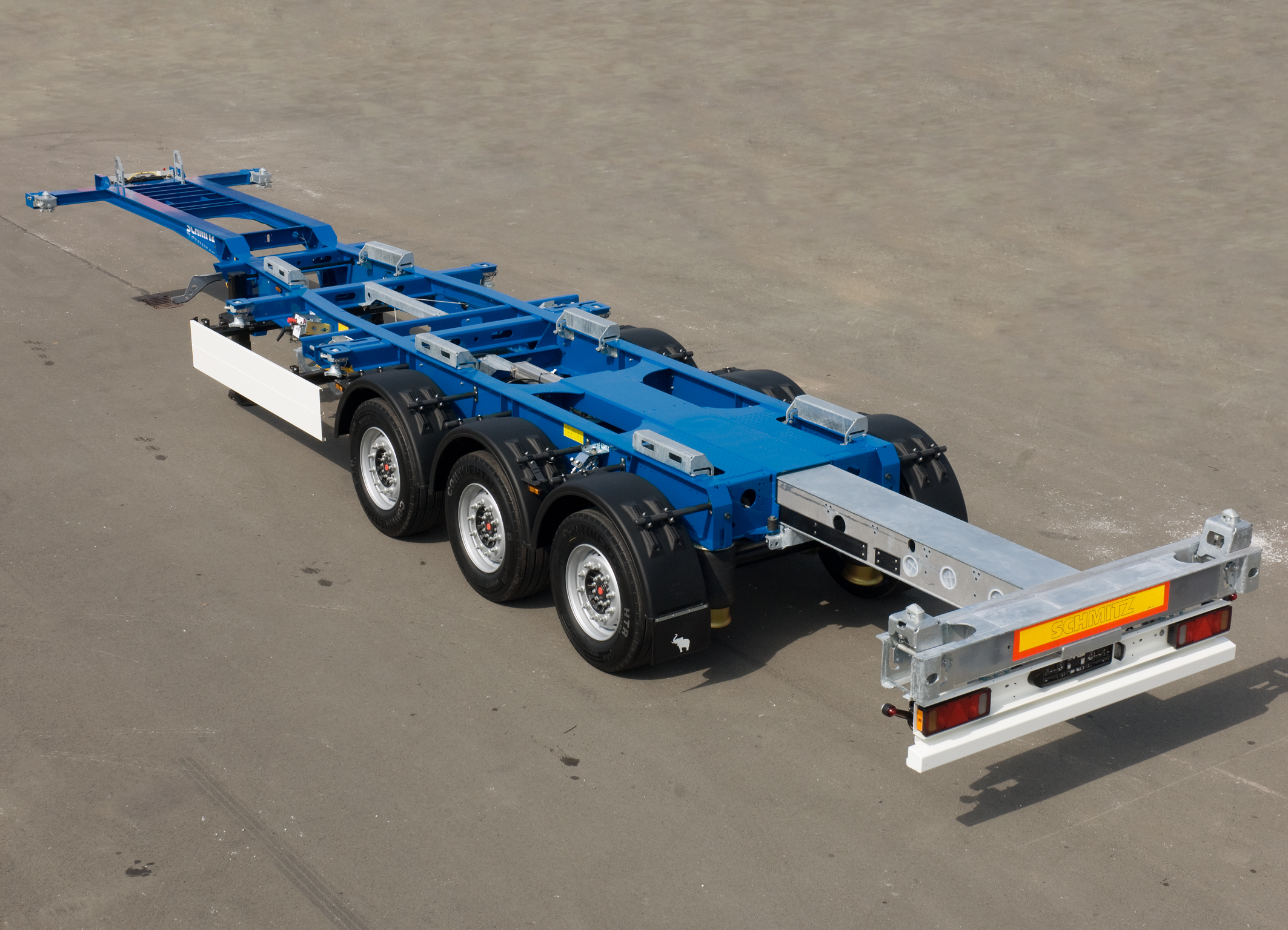
Container trailer

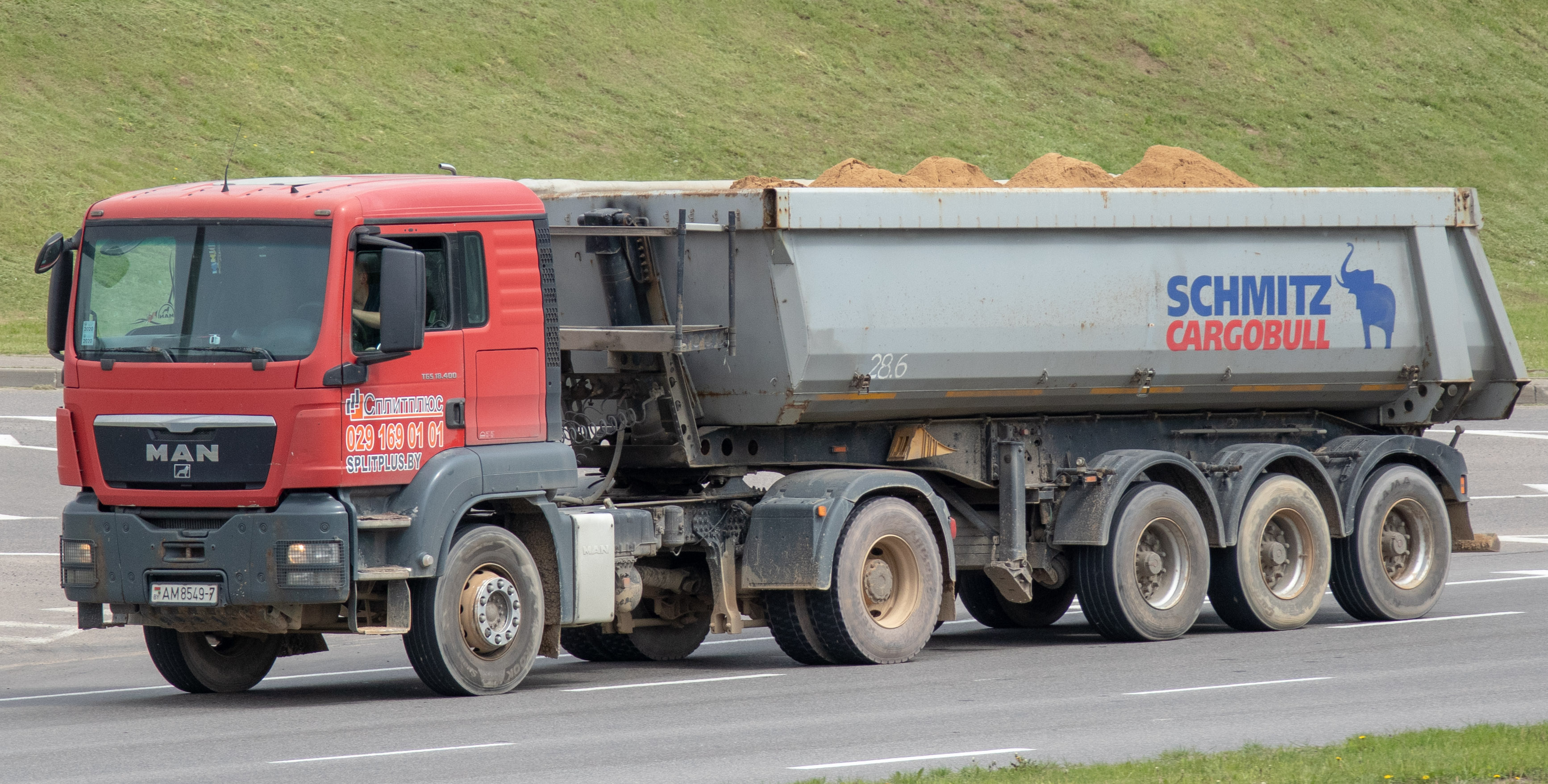
Tipper semi-trailer

== Schmitz Cargobull in Great Britain ==
In 1991 Schmitz Cargobull took over a production facility for refrigerated vehicles (York Thermostar) in Harelaw, County Durham. The Harelaw plant was modernised and equipped with flexible production lines for manufacturing box vehicles and curtainsiders. Production ceased in July 2010 as a result of the drastic decrease in turnover in England due to the worldwide financial crisis. The plant in Harelaw was shut down in 2011. After the end of 2010 and during 2011, in particular, the order situation in Great Britain stabilised and Schmitz Cargobull saw renewed success on the British trailer market. The head office of Schmitz Cargobull (UK) Ltd. is located in Warrington, Cheshire.

In 2022, Schmitz Cargobull featured in the October issue of Bulk & Tipper magazine, visiting the Gotha production plant in Germany where their full range of tipping trailers and steel bodies are created.

== Locations ==
The majority of the production is carried out in Germany and is marketed internationally. The primary sales markets consist of Western, Northern, Central and Eastern Europe as well as the Asia-Pacific, Near and Middle East. The company maintains production sites in Germany in Altenberge, Vreden, Gotha, Berlin and Toddin and also in other European countries in Saragossa (Spain), Panevėžys (Lithuania) and St Petersburg (Russia). An additional production facility opened in Wuhan (China) in 2014. Schmitz Cargobull is represented in all European countries with its own sales branches and sales partners and maintains a network of approximately 1,200 authorised workshops throughout Europe.

== Brand ==
The Schmitz Cargobull brand name with the blue elephant as its trademark was introduced at the end of the 1980s. Up until that time the company operated under the name Schmitz-Anhänger Fahrzeugbau GmbH and Co. KG.
