= Dominik Schmidt =

German footballer

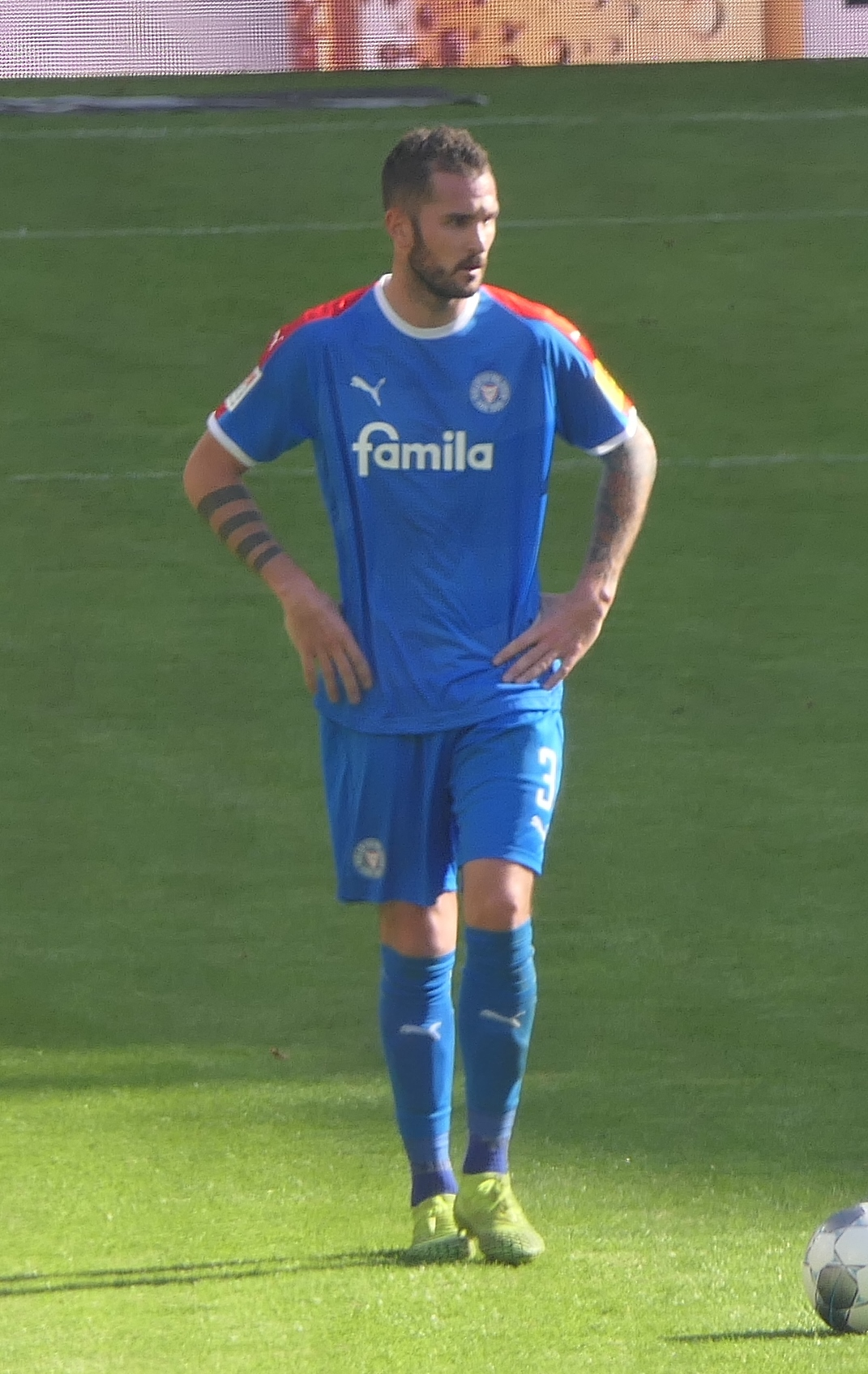
- Schmidt in 2019

Personal information
- Date of birth: 1 July 1987 (age 39)
- Place of birth: West Berlin, West Germany
- Height: 1.87 m (6 ft 2 in)
- Position: Defender

Team information
- Current team: Atlas Delmenhorst
- Number: 41

Senior career*
Years	Team	Apps	(Gls)
2006–2011	Werder Bremen II	104	(4)
2009–2011	Werder Bremen	12	(0)
2011–2012	Eintracht Frankfurt	1	(0)
2011–2012	Eintracht Frankfurt II	15	(0)
2012–2015	Preußen Münster	72	(8)
2015–2020	Holstein Kiel	142	(5)
2020–2022	MSV Duisburg	27	(1)
2022–	Atlas Delmenhorst	0	(0)
- * Club domestic league appearances and goals as of 16:19, 30 January 2022 (UTC)

Dominik Schmidt (born 1 July 1987) is a German professional footballer who plays as a defender for Atlas Delmenhorst.

== Career ==
In June 2015, it was announced Schmidt would join 3. Liga side Holstein Kiel from Preußen Münster for the 2015–16 season having signed a two-year contract.

In March 2017, Schmidt agreed a contract extension until 2019 with Holstein Kiel.

In April 2020, it was announced that Holstein Kiel would not extend his contract beyond the 2019–20 season. He signed for MSV Duisburg on 18 August 2020. He left Duisburg on mutual consent in January 2022.

Schmidt moved to Regionalliga Nord club Atlas Delmenhorst in late January 2022. He signed a 1.5-year contract with the option of a further year.

== Career statistics ==
As of match played 2 October 2021

Appearances and goals by club, season and competition
Club	Season	League			Cup		Other		Total	
Club	Season	Division	Apps	Goals	Apps	Goals	Apps	Goals	Apps	Goals
Werder Bremen II	2006–07	Regionalliga	14	1	—		—		14	1
Werder Bremen II	2007–08	Regionalliga	22	2	2	0	—		24	2
Werder Bremen II	2008–09	3. Liga	34	1	—		—		34	1
Werder Bremen II	2009–10	3. Liga	22	0	—		—		22	0
Werder Bremen II	2010–11	3. Liga	12	0	—		—		12	0
Werder Bremen II	Total		104	4	2	0	—		106	4
Werder Bremen	2010–11	Bundesliga	12	0	0	0	2	0	14	0
Eintracht Frankfurt	2011–12	2. Bundesliga	1	0	0	0	—		1	0
Eintracht Frankfurt II	2011–12	Regionalliga	15	0	—		—		15	0
Preußen Münster	2012–13	3. Liga	14	2	1	0	—		15	2
Preußen Münster	2013–14	3. Liga	29	2	1	0	—		30	2
Preußen Münster	2014–15	3. Liga	29	4	1	0	—		30	4
Preußen Münster	Total		72	8	3	0	—		75	8
Holstein Kiel	2015–16	3. Liga	27	4	0	0	—		27	4
Holstein Kiel	2016–17	3. Liga	31	0	—		—		31	0
Holstein Kiel	2017–18	2. Bundesliga	32	1	2	0	2	0	36	1
Holstein Kiel	2018–19	2. Bundesliga	31	0	3	0	—		34	0
Holstein Kiel	2019–20	2. Bundesliga	21	0	0	0	—		21	0
Holstein Kiel	Total		142	5	5	0	2	0	149	5
MSV Duisburg	2020–21	3. Liga	26	1	0	0	—		26	1
MSV Duisburg	2021–22	3. Liga	1	0	—		—		1	0
MSV Duisburg	Total		27	1	0	0	—		27	1
Career total			373	18	10	0	4	0	387	18
