= Alice Rohe =

American journalist

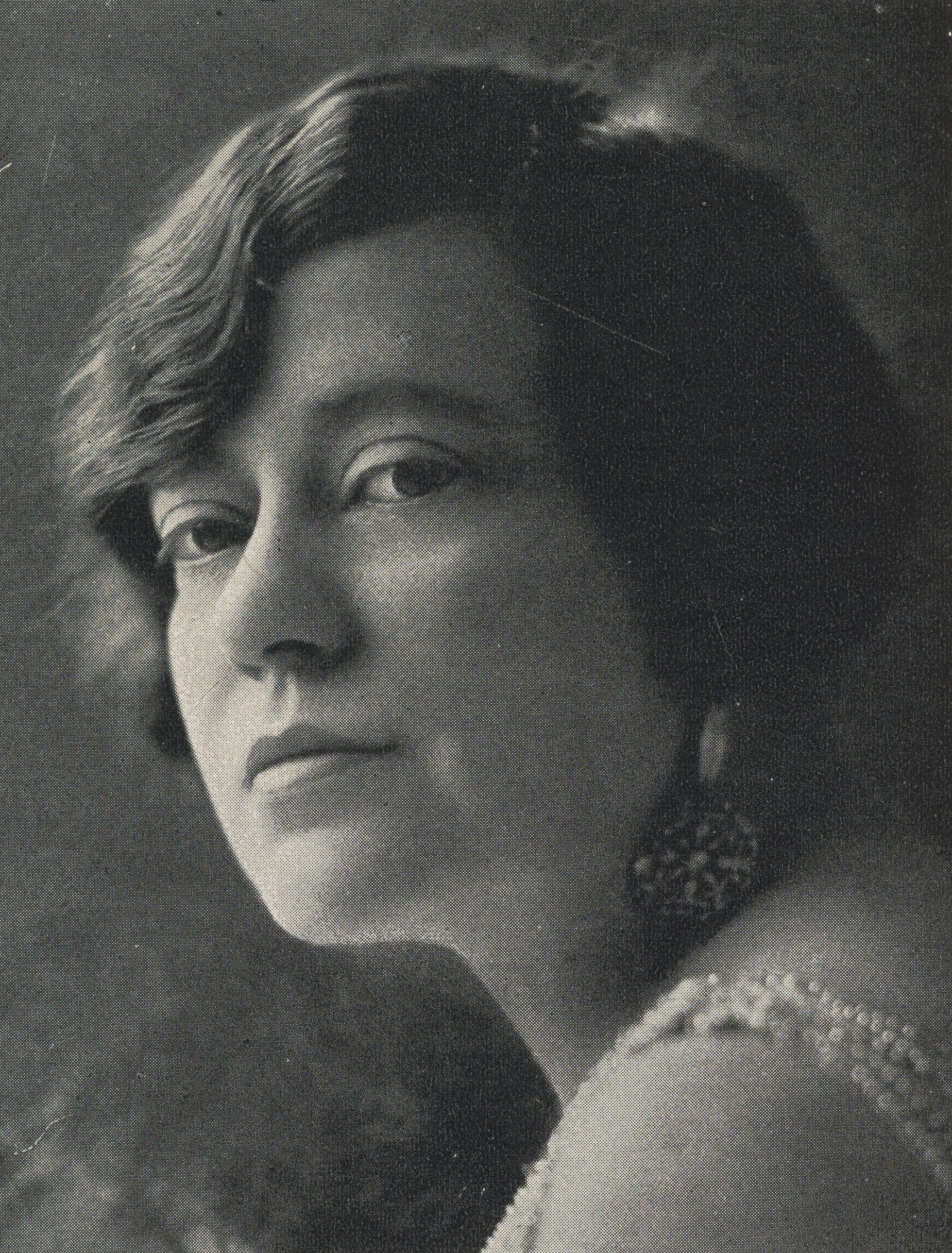
- Alice Rohe between 1900 and 1920.
- Born: Alice Rohe; January 15, 1876; Lawrence, Kansas, United States
- Died: April 7, 1957 (aged 81); New York City, United States
- Resting place: United States
- Education: University of Kansas
- Occupations: Author, journalist
- Writing career
- Language: English

Alice Rohe (January 15, 1876 – April 7, 1957) was an American author and journalist. Rohe served as the first female bureau chief of a major American press service in World War I.

Alice Rohe was born January 15, 1876, in Lawrence, Kansas, United States. During the first World War she reported from Italy for the United Press. She wrote about the principality of "San Marino" who served as one of America's smallest ally. She was arrested for spying twice but each time she was released. A later comment by George Creel described her as a "volunteer" which implies that she may have been serving as a spy.

Rohe came back to the United States in 1935. She died on April 7, 1957, and donated her collection of Etruscan artifacts to the University of Kansas.

== Bibliography ==
- Our Littlest Ally (1918)

=== Selected Written Resources ===
There are some selected written resources written by Alice Rohe.

- Abdul Ba-ha Patriarchal Head of Bahaists in Denver With Message of Love and Justice to All and for All, The Daily News, September 25, 1912
- Mackay Presents Woman As Leader In Human Progress. The Baltimore Sun, April 8, 1914
- Come, Die With Me' Begs Youth To a Stranger at Busy Corner, Colonel Adam Rohe, Visitor From Kansas Who Served in War Escapes From Would-Be-Suicide and Quickly Boards a Car. Denver Daily News, before 1915
- Hitch in Vatican Plan: Peace Program Believed to Have Encountered Difficulty..., The Washington Post, November 26, 1915
- Wait Action By Pope: Rome Diplomats See German Appeal to Vatican..., Washington Post, December 2, 1915
- Peace Offer to Pope. Kaiser Said to Have Made Proposal Through the Vatican., Washington Post, December 5, 1915
- Women Weep in Rome's Poverty-Stricken San Lorenzo District For Their Men Who Are at Front. Washington Post, January 30, 1916
- American Newspapers Help Provide Hot Rations for Italians at Front. Washington Post, February 27, 1916
- Our Littlest Ally. National Geographic Magazine 34 (August, 1918):138-63
- Queen Santa Claus. Good Housekeeping 69 (December 1919):15-16, 121-125
- Snaps of Macedonia. Travel 35 (May 1920):11-15
- The Story of Susan Glaspell., The Morning Telegraph, December 18, 1921, Sec. 2
- Mussolini, Hope of Youth, Italy's 'Man of Tomorrow.' The New York Times, November 5, 1922
- New Italian Renascence. The Bookman 56 (June 1923): 653-55
- At Last Native American Plays., The Independent, April 12, 1924
- Only in a Crowd Could I Do It., Collier's 73 (Jan. 26, 1924):15
- American Repertoire Theatre?, The Independent 112 (June 7, 1924): 317-18
- Pirandella's Warning. The Forum 71 (June 1924):791
- Only in America., The Independent 114 (April 11, 1925):405
- I Was Dying—I Made It My Job to Get Well., Hearst's International combined with Cosmopolitan 78 (May 1925): 34
- Why I Fled Italy., Reader's Digest, 28 (April 1936):47-50. "Mussolini, Lady Killer.", The Literary Digest 124 (July 31, 1937): 27.
