= Dennis Dowidat =

German footballer

Personal information
- Date of birth: 10 January 1990 (age 36)
- Place of birth: Düsseldorf, West Germany
- Height: 1.72 m (5 ft 8 in)
- Position: Midfielder

Team information
- Current team: TSV Meerbusch
- Number: 8

Youth career
- –2002: TuRU Düsseldorf
- 2002–2004: Fortuna Düsseldorf
- 2004–2009: Borussia Mönchengladbach

Senior career*
Years	Team	Apps	(Gls)
2009–2012	Borussia M'gladbach II	71	(16)
2012–2013	Preußen Münster	8	(0)
2013	Borussia M'gladbach II	16	(4)
2013–2017	Alemannia Aachen	93	(15)
2017–2018	Wuppertaler SV	22	(2)
2018–	TSV Meerbusch	31	(9)

International career
2007	Germany U-17	21	(4)
2007–2008	Germany U-18	3	(0)
- * Club domestic league appearances and goals as of 21:19, 5 August 2019 (UTC)

Dennis Dowidat (born 10 January 1990) is a German footballer who plays as a midfielder. Most recently, he has played for TSV Meerbusch in the Oberliga Niederrhein.

== Career ==
Dowidat first joined Borussia Mönchengladbach as a fourteen-year-old, and spent the next five years in the youth setup, followed by three playing in the reserve team. In July 2012 he signed for Preußen Münster of the 3. Liga, where he made his debut on the opening day of the 2012–13 season, as a substitute for Benjamin Siegert in a 2–0 win against Wacker Burghausen. He made eight appearances in the first half of the season, before returning to Gladbach in January 2013. After a further six months playing for the reserve team, he signed for Alemannia Aachen.
