= Julian Westermann =

German footballer

Personal information
- Date of birth: April 19, 1991 (age 35)
- Place of birth: Germany
- Position: Right-back

Youth career
- –2010: Preußen Münster

Senior career*
Years	Team	Apps	(Gls)
2010–2012	Preußen Münster	22	(0)
2012–2013	Sportfreunde Lotte	2	(0)
- * Club domestic league appearances and goals as of November 30, 2012

Julian Westermann (born April 19, 1991) is a German footballer who played in the 3. Liga for Preußen Münster.
