= Mehmet Kara =

Turkish footballer (born 1983)

Personal information
- Date of birth: 21 November 1983 (age 42)
- Place of birth: Werne, West Germany
- Height: 1.75 m (5 ft 9 in)
- Position: Midfielder

Team information
- Current team: VfL Kamen

Senior career*
Years	Team	Apps	(Gls)
2002–2003	SuS Oberaden	14	(1)
2003–2004	Gaziantep BB	11	(0)
2004–2006	Gaziantepspor	3	(0)
2006–2007	Hammer SpVg	19	(1)
2007–2011	Preußen Münster	64	(4)
2011–2012	SC Paderborn	19	(2)
2012–2013	Gençlerbirliği	7	(0)
2013–2017	Preußen Münster	132	(18)
2017–2018	Preußen Münster II		
2018–2019	Rot Weiss Ahlen	28	(3)
2019–2020	Lüner SV		
2020–	VfL Kamen		
- * Club domestic league appearances and goals

Mehmet Kara (born 21 November 1983) is a Turkish professional footballer who plays as a midfielder for VfL Kamen.

== Career ==
In summer 2017, while at 3. Liga side Preußen Münster, Kara was demoted to the club's reserve team playing in the sixth-tier Westfalenliga.
