= Julian Loose =

German footballer

Personal information
- Date of birth: 17 May 1985 (age 41)
- Place of birth: Germany
- Height: 1.85 m (6 ft 1 in)
- Position: Right midfielder

Team information
- Current team: SC Greven 09

Youth career
- SC Greven 09
- –2001: Preußen Münster
- 2001–2004: Arminia Bielefeld

Senior career*
Years	Team	Apps	(Gls)
2004–2006	Arminia Bielefeld II	65	(10)
2006–2008	Schalke 04 II	54	(17)
2008–2012	Preußen Münster	90	(11)
2012–2014	Sportfreunde Lotte	44	(8)
2014–2016	SC Wiedenbrück 2000	65	(5)
2017–	SC Greven 09	0	(0)
- * Club domestic league appearances and goals as of 12 December 2015

Julian Loose (born 17 May 1985) is a German footballer who plays for SC Greven 09.
