= Sercan Güvenışık =

Turkish footballer (born 1980)

Personal information
- Full name: Sercan Bilinç Güvenışık
- Date of birth: 1 March 1980 (age 46)
- Place of birth: Ankara, Turkey
- Height: 1.75 m (5 ft 9 in)
- Position: Forward

Team information
- Current team: Miami Dade FC
- Number: 9

Youth career
- VSC 1862 Donauwörth
- 1997–1999: FC Augsburg
- 1998: Bayern Munich

Senior career*
Years	Team	Apps	(Gls)
1999–2003	MSV Duisburg	80	(12)
2002–2003	→ Denizlispor (loan)	0	(0)
2003–2004	1. SC Feucht	10	(2)
2004–2005	Manisapor	9	(3)
2005–2006	Preußen Münster	11	(6)
2006–2007	Carl Zeiss Jena	10	(0)
2007–2008	Rot-Weiss Essen	24	(6)
2008–2009	SC Paderborn	39	(17)
2010–2012	Preußen Münster	56	(14)
2012	San Jose Earthquakes	5	(0)
2017–	Miami Dade FC	3	(1)

International career
1998	Turkey U17	3	(0)
2001	Turkey U21	3	(0)
- * Club domestic league appearances and goals as of 3 September 2012

Sercan Bilinç Güvenışık (born 1 March 1980) is a Turkish footballer currently playing for Miami Dade FC.

== Club career ==
Güvenışık began his career in the youth setup of VSC 1862 Donauwörth. In 1997, he joined the youth program of FC Augsburg. After a brief stint in the youth system of FC Bayern Munich he returned to Augsburg and played for the club in the Regional league, scoring 10 goals in 29 appearances.

In 1999, he signed for Bundesliga side MSV Duisburg and made his debut in the top flight at 19 years of age. In four years with the club Güvenışık made 80 league appearances and scored 12 goals. In July 2003, he joined Turkish First Division side Denizlispor on loan, but left after only six months to join the Southern Regional League club 1. SC Feucht. The following season he returned to Turkey signing with Turkish First Division side Manisapor. Due to payment irregularities he returned to Germany after only six months. He joined SC Preußen Münster for the second half of the North Regional League and went on to score six goals in 11 games, becoming a crowd favorite ("King Güven"), but could not prevent the club's relegation.

In the summer of 2006, he joined 2. Bundesliga club FC Carl Zeiss Jena but was unable to make an impact for the side as he was sidelined for six months due to a cruciate ligament injury. In June 2007, he signed for Rot-Weiss Essen on a one-year contract. He appeared in 24 league matches for the club and scored six goals. For the 2008–09 season, Güvenışık moved to third division side SC Paderborn 07. In his first year at the club, Güvenışık scored 17 goals in 30 matches as he helped lead Paderborn 07 to promotion to the second division. The following season, he only made nine appearances for the club and during the winter break returned to SC Preußen Münster. Upon his return, he continued to be a crowd favorite and during the 2010–11 season helped the club gain promotion to the third division by scoring seven goals in 25 matches. In his second spell with the club, Güvenışık appeared in 56 league matches and scored fourteen goals.

Güvenışık signed with Major League Soccer club San Jose Earthquakes on 26 January 2012. He was the first Turkish player to sign in MLS. San Jose released him after the 2012 season and he trialed with Columbus Crew SC during the 2013 preseason, but was not offered a contract.

== International career ==
Güvenışık represented Turkey at the Under 17 and the Under 21 levels.

== Honours ==
=== Miami Dade FC ===
APSL - Regular Season Champion (2017)

APSL - APSL Champion (2017)
