= Danny Fuchs =

German footballer

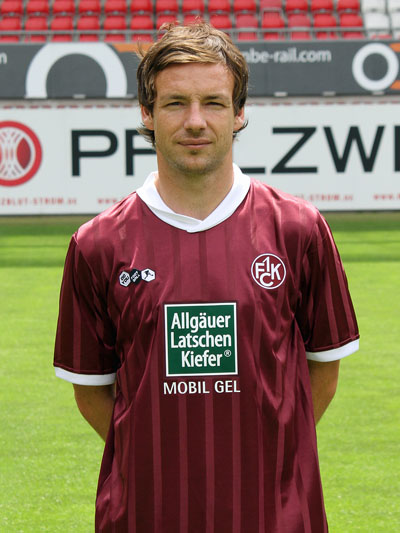
- Fuchs in 2010

Personal information
- Date of birth: 25 February 1976 (age 50)
- Place of birth: Dessau, East Germany
- Height: 1.78 m (5 ft 10 in)
- Position: Midfielder

Youth career
- Traktor Quellendorf
- Motor Köthen
- –1994: Hallescher FC

Senior career*
Years	Team	Apps	(Gls)
1994–1996	SV Wehen	19	(2)
1996–2001	1860 Munich II	142	(35)
2001–2003	Karlsruher SC	53	(11)
2003–2007	Greuther Fürth	71	(14)
2007–2009	VfL Bochum	17	(1)
2008–2009	VfL Bochum II	3	(1)
2009–2011	1. FC Kaiserslautern	18	(0)
Total		323	(64)
- * Club domestic league appearances and goals

Danny Fuchs (born 25 February 1976) is a German former professional footballer who played as a midfielder.
