= Wesseler W 17 =

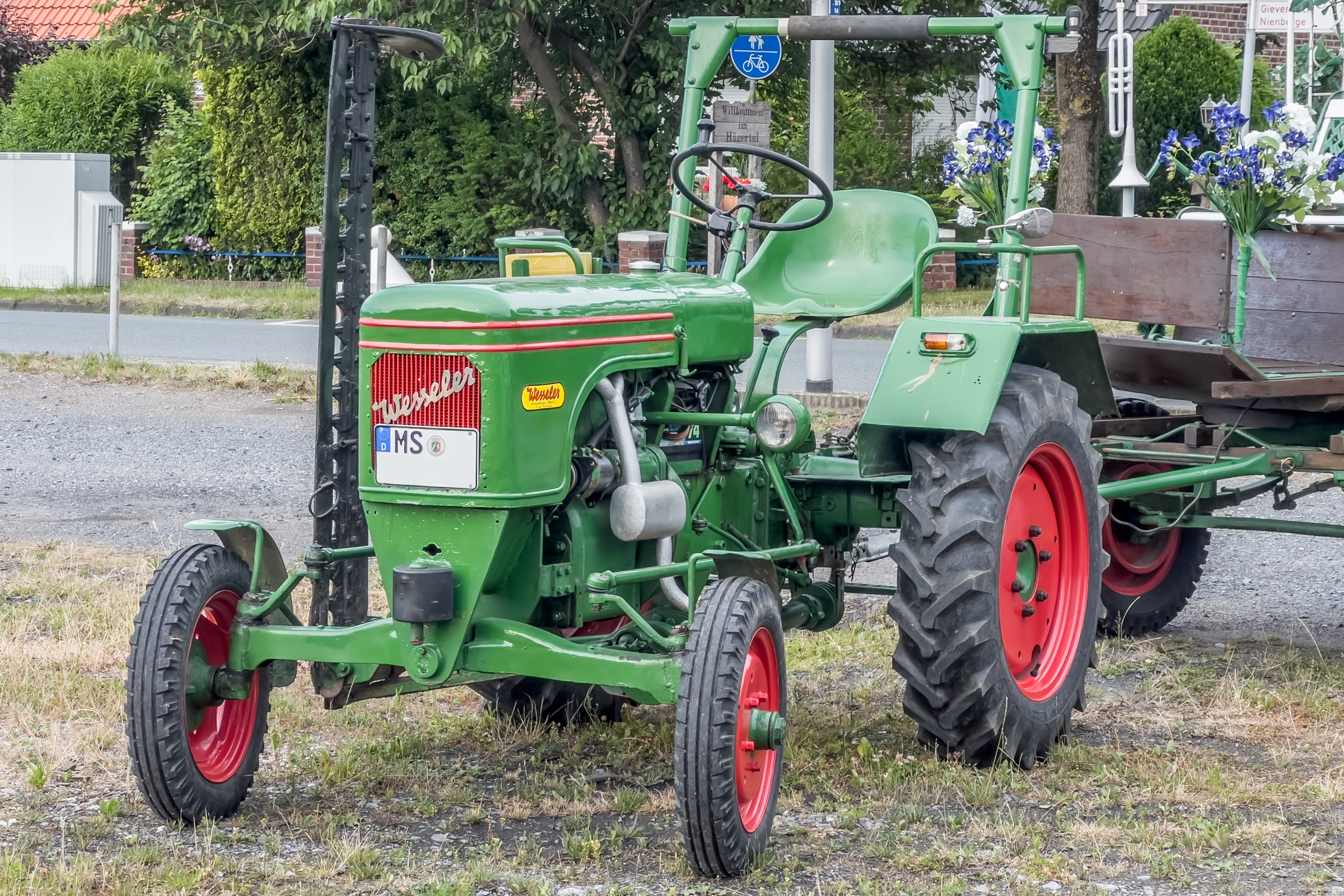
- Type: agricultural
- Manufacturer: H. Wesseler OHG
- Production: 1954–1956
- Length: 2,600 mm (100 in)
- Width: 1,510–1,626 mm (59.4–64.0 in)
- Height: 1,580 mm (62 in)
- Weight: 1,050 kg (2,310 lb)
- Propulsion: Air-filled tyres
- Engine model: MWM KD 211 Z two-cylinder swirl-chamber Diesel, water-cooled
- Engine displacement: 1,250 cm^{3} (76 in^{3})
- Transmission: ZF A-5/5 five-speed constant-mesh gearbox without synchroniser rings; ZF A-5/6 six-speed constant-mesh gearbox without synchroniser rings
- Flywheel power: DIN 6270 B: 17 PS (13 kW) at 2000/min; DIN 70020: 20 PS (15 kW) at 2200/min
- Speed: 2.7–19.8 km/h (1.7–12.3 mph)
- Preceded by: none
- Succeeded by: Wesseler W 18

The Wesseler W 17 is an agricultural tractor made by H. Wesseler OHG. It is the firm's smallest two-cylinder model and was made from 1954 until 1956. In the Netherlands, the tractor was sold under the Vewema brand.

== Technical description ==
The W 17 is based on a frameless design with the rear axle and front axle assembly directly flange-mounted to the engine. The rear axle is a ZF A-5/5 (or ZF A-5/6) transmission unit consisting of a portal axle and a constant-mesh gearbox with either five or six forward gears, and a regular reverse gear. The six-speed versions of the gearbox have an additional 1.5 km/h crawler gear below first gear, but are otherwise identical to the five-speed units, i.e. they have the same gearing and thus offer the exact same speeds. The transmission unit is designed for a maximum continuous input torque of 6.5 kp⋅m (64 N⋅m; 47 lbf⋅ft) and was available with a differential lock and a PTO. Since there is no drive shaft to the front axle, all W 17 tractors are rear-wheel drive only. The front axle is an unsprung stub axle with a central longitudinal pivot point. In front, the tractor has 4.5–16 inch tyres, in back it has 7–24 inch tyres. The rear wheels are fitted with mechanically operated duplex drum brakes. With factory new 7–24 inch rear tyres, the tractor can reach a top speed of 19.8 km/h (12.3 mph) at the rated engine speed of 2000/min.

Wessler installed an MWM KD 211 Z industrial Diesel engine in the W 17. The KD 211 Z is a two-cylinder, naturally aspirated four-stroke Diesel engine with a 85 mm (3.3 in) bore and a 110 mm (4.3 in) stroke, resulting in a displacement of about 1.25 dm^{3} (76 in^{3}). It has a crossflow cylinder head with two overhead valves, and swirl-chamber injection, allowing a low injection pressure of 125 kp/cm^{2} (12.3 MPa; 1,780 lbf/in^{2}). The water pump is flange-mounted to the head and driven by a belt from the engine's crankshaft. In its default configuration, the engine has a BMEP of ca. 640 kPa (93 lbf/in^{2}), and a rated fuel consumption of 200 g/(PS·h) (ca. 272 g/(kW·h); 0.447 lb/(hp·h)). The rated engine power (DIN 70020) is 20 PS (15 kW; 20 hp) at 2200/min, and the rated continuous power output (DIN 6270 B) is 17 PS (13 kW; 17 hp) at 2000/min. The engine can be hand-cranked.
