= Toddin =

- Municipality
- Coat of arms

- Location of Toddin within Ludwigslust-Parchim district
- Interactive map of Toddin
- Location within Germany Location within Mecklenburg-Vorpommern
- Coordinates: 53°25′N 11°07′E
- Country: Germany
- State: Mecklenburg-Vorpommern
- District: Ludwigslust-Parchim
- Municipal assoc.: Hagenow-Land
- Subdivisions: 6

Government
  - Mayor: Ute Möbius

Area
  - Total: 31.63 km^{2} (12.21 sq mi)
- Elevation: 22 m (72 ft)

Population (2025-12-31)
  - Total: 872
  - Density: 27.6/km^{2} (71.4/sq mi)
- Time zone: UTC+01:00 (CET)
  - Summer (DST): UTC+02:00 (CEST)
- Postal codes: 19230
- Dialling codes: 03883
- Vehicle registration: LWL
- Website: www.amt-hagenow-land.de

Toddin is a municipality in the Ludwigslust-Parchim district, in Mecklenburg-Vorpommern, Germany. The former municipality Setzin was merged into Toddin in May 2019.
