= Pascal Koopmann =

German footballer

Personal information
- Date of birth: 10 February 1990 (age 36)
- Place of birth: Altenberge, Germany
- Height: 1.73 m (5 ft 8 in)
- Position: Midfielder

Team information
- Current team: Preußen Münster II
- Number: 20

Youth career
- –2006: TuS Altenberge
- 2006–2011: Preußen Münster

Senior career*
Years	Team	Apps	(Gls)
2011–2014	Preußen Münster	2	(0)
2014–2017	SC Roland Beckum	84	(5)
2017–2021	Borussia Münster		
2021–	Preußen Münster II	28	(2)
- * Club domestic league appearances and goals as of 13 November 2022

Pascal Koopmann (born 10 February 1990) is a German footballer who plays for Preußen Münster II.

== Club career ==
He made his professional debut for Preußen Münster in April 2012, as a substitute for Dennis Grote in a 4–1 defeat against 1. FC Heidenheim in the 3. Liga.
