= Patrick Kirsch =

German footballer

Personal information
- Date of birth: 1 January 1981 (age 45)
- Place of birth: Kirn, West Germany
- Position: Central defender

Youth career
- –2000: FC Herxheim

Senior career*
| Years | Team | Apps | (Gls) |
| 2000–2003 | SC Idar-Oberstein | 90 | (4) |
| 2003–2004 | SV Wehen | 23 | (0) |
| 2004–2005 | TuS Koblenz | 31 | (0) |
| 2005–2006 | Eintracht Bad Kreuznach | 22 | (1) |
| 2006–2009 | SSV Reutlingen | 78 | (4) |
| 2009–2010 | SV Sandhausen | 29 | (1) |
| 2010 | Wacker Burghausen | 18 | (0) |
| 2010–2015 | Preußen Münster | 104 | (7) |
- * Club domestic league appearances and goals as of 30 June 2015

Patrick Kirsch (born 1 January 1981) is a German footballer who last played for Preußen Münster.
