= Clément Halet =

French footballer (born 1984)

Personal information
- Date of birth: 21 May 1984 (age 42)
- Place of birth: Strasbourg, France
- Height: 1.84 m (6 ft 0 in)
- Position: Defender

Youth career
- 2001–2003: Strasbourg

Senior career*
Years	Team	Apps	(Gls)
2003–2005	Stade Lavallois B	52	(0)
2003–2005	Laval	3	(0)
2005–2008	1. FC Saarbrücken	47	(0)
2008–2009	Fortuna Düsseldorf	25	(0)
2010	VfR Aalen	0	(0)
2010–2014	Preußen Münster	58	(1)
2014–2016	FC Homburg	27	(0)
- * Club domestic league appearances and goals

Clément Halet (born 21 May 1984) is a French former professional footballer who played as a defender.
