= Babacar N'Diaye =

Senegalese footballer

Personal information
- Date of birth: 12 December 1973 (age 52)
- Place of birth: Thiès, Senegal
- Height: 1.89 m (6 ft 2 in)
- Position: Forward

Team information
- Current team: RB Leipzig (team manager)

Senior career*
Years	Team	Apps	(Gls)
–1995	US Rail		
1995	Union Solingen		
- FC Wehr 191
–1997	Wuppertaler SV Borussia		
1997–2000	Hannover 96	29	(2)
2000–2001	Hannover 96 II		
2001–2002	Hannover 96	22	(8)
2003	→ FC St. Pauli (loan)	16	(3)
2003	Hannover 96	0	(0)
2003–2005	LR Ahlen	54	(10)
2005–2007	SpVgg Unterhaching	58	(6)
2007	Carl Zeiss Jena	0	(0)
2008	SC Verl	14	(5)
2008	Türkiyemspor Berlin	7	(4)
2009	SV Babelsberg 03	30	(28)
2009–2010	TSV Havelse		
2010–2013	Preußen Münster	34	(12)

Managerial career
- 2009–2010: TSV Havelse (general manager)
- * Club domestic league appearances and goals

Babacar N'Diaye (born 12 December 1973) is a Senegalese former professional footballer who played as a forward. He is currently the team manager of Bundesliga club RB Leipzig.

== Career ==
N'Diaye was born in Thiès, Senegal. He spent two seasons in the Bundesliga with Hannover 96.

== Coaching career ==
On 1 July 2009, he signed a contract as player-manager with TSV Havelse.

== Personal life ==
N'Diaye also holds German citizenship.
