= David Buchholz =

German footballer

Personal information
- Date of birth: 5 August 1984 (age 42)
- Place of birth: Guben, West Germany
- Height: 1.87 m (6 ft 2 in)
- Position: Goalkeeper

Youth career
- FC Kray
- Schalke 04
- Schwarz-Weiß Essen
- –2006: Rot-Weiss Essen
- 2006–2007: Vorwärts Kornharpen

Senior career*
Years	Team	Apps	(Gls)
2005–2006	Rot-Weiss Essen II		
2006–2007	Vorwärts Kornharpen		
2007–2008	VfL Bochum II	25	(0)
2008–2012	Preußen Münster	91	(0)
2012–2014	Sportfreunde Lotte	52	(0)
2014–2016	FC 08 Homburg	43	(0)
2016–2018	Sportfreunde Lotte	16	(0)
2018–2019	SV Straelen	17	(0)
2019–2021	VfL Osnabrück	0	(0)
2021	Sportfreunde Lotte	3	(0)
- * Club domestic league appearances and goals

David Buchholz (born 5 August 1984) is a German former professional footballer who played as a goalkeeper.
