= Philip Röhe =

German footballer

Personal information
- Date of birth: 25 April 1994 (age 32)
- Place of birth: Germany
- Height: 1.81 m (5 ft 11 in)
- Position: Right-back

Team information
- Current team: 1. FC Gievenbeck
- Number: 4

Youth career
- –2009: Arminia Ochtrup
- 2009–2013: Preußen Münster

Senior career*
Years	Team	Apps	(Gls)
2013–2015	Preußen Münster	1	(0)
2015–2020	FC Eintracht Rheine	84	(3)
2020–	1. FC Gievenbeck	17	(1)
- * Club domestic league appearances and goals as of 13 November 2022

Philip Röhe (born 25 April 1994) is a German footballer who plays for Oberliga Westfalen club 1. FC Gievenbeck.

== Club career ==
He made his 3. Liga debut for Preußen Münster in October 2013, as a substitute for Dennis Grote in a 4–0 win over Chemnitzer FC.
