= Stefan Kühne =

German footballer and coach

Personal information
- Full name: Tim Stefan Kühne
- Date of birth: 15 August 1980 (age 46)
- Place of birth: Wiesbaden, West Germany
- Height: 1.86 m (6 ft 1 in)
- Position: Midfielder

Team information
- Current team: SC Preußen Münster
- Number: 8

Youth career
- 1985–1990: SV Biebrich 19
- 1990–1996: SpVgg Sonnenberg
- 1994–1996: 1. FSV Mainz 05

Senior career*
Years	Team	Apps	(Gls)
1998–2004	1. FSV Mainz 05 II	152	(43)
2002–2004	1. FSV Mainz 05	3	(0)
2004–2005	Holstein Kiel	32	(5)
2006–2007	Holstein Kiel II	6	(3)
2006–2008	Carl Zeiss Jena	51	(1)
2007–2008	Carl Zeiss Jena II	8	(2)
2008–2009	Rot-Weiss Essen	31	(5)
2009–2010	Carl Zeiss Jena	23	(0)
2010–2014	Preußen Münster	124	(18)

Managerial career
- 2014–2015: Rot-Weiss Essen (assistant)
- * Club domestic league appearances and goals

Tim Stefan Kühne (born 15 August 1980, in Wiesbaden) is a German football coach and former football midfielder.
