= Preußenstadion =

Football stadium in Münster, Germany

Coordinates: 51°55′47″N 7°37′29″E

LVM-Preußenstadion
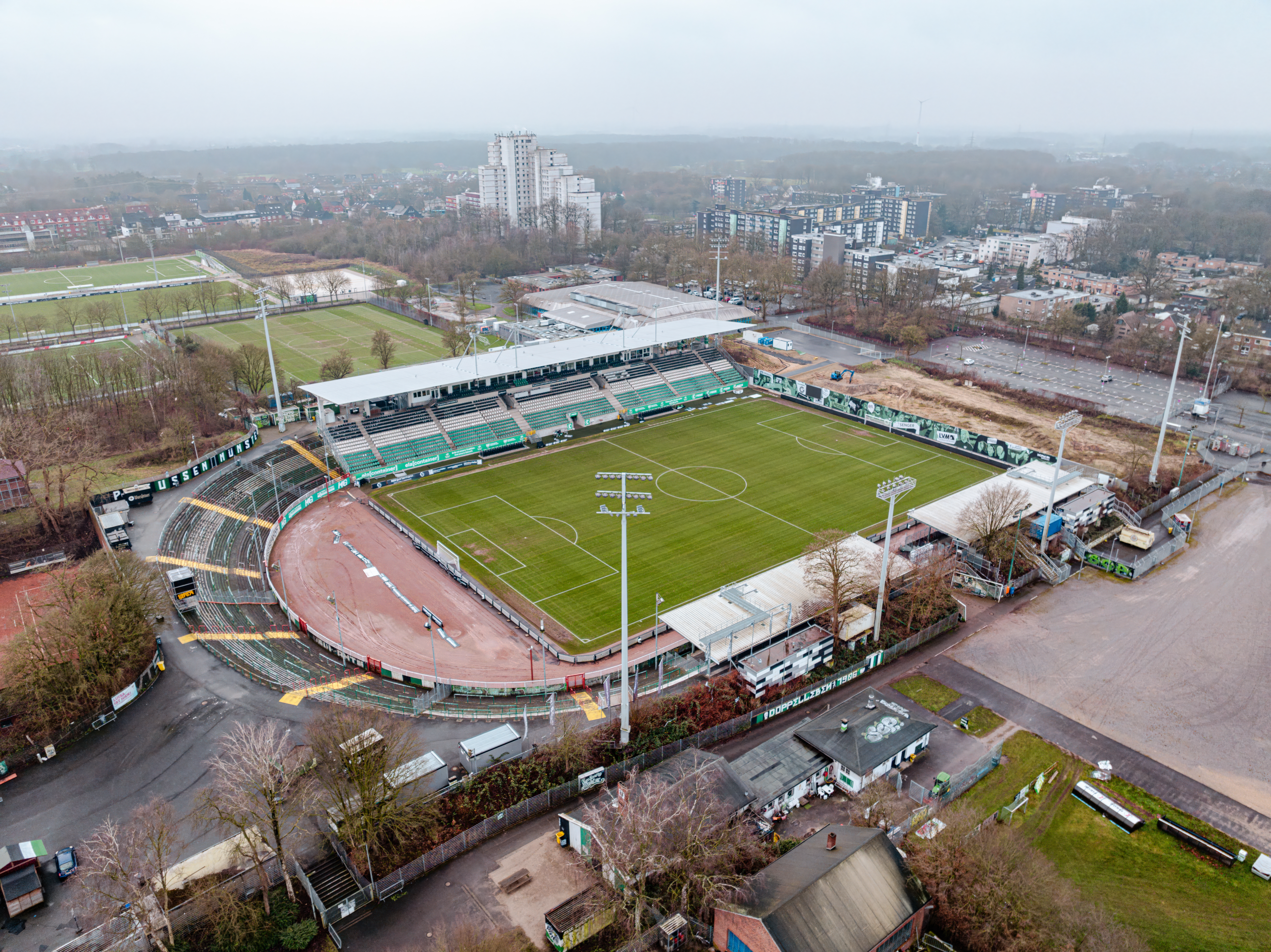
- Interactive map of LVM-Preußenstadion
- Former names: Preußenstadion
- Location: Münster, Germany
- Owner: Münster municipality
- Operator: Preußen Münster
- Capacity: 40,000 (original); 14,300 (current)
- Surface: Grass

Construction
- Opened: June 12, 1926; 100 years ago
- Renovated: 1948; 2008–2012; 2022–present

Tenant
- Preußen Münster

Preußenstadion, currently known as LVM-Preußenstadion for sponsorship reasons, is a multi-use stadium in Münster, Germany. It is used as the stadium of Preußen Münster matches. The capacity of the stadium is 14,300 spectators. The record attendance for a match of Preußen Münster at the venue is around 40,000.
