= Daniel Masuch =

German footballer

Personal information
- Date of birth: 24 April 1977 (age 49)
- Place of birth: Duisburg, West Germany
- Height: 1.90 m (6 ft 3 in)
- Position: Goalkeeper

Youth career
- –1996: Viktoria Buchholz

Senior career*
Years	Team	Apps	(Gls)
1996–2000	SF Hamborn 07		
2000–2005	Adler Osterfeld		
2005–2006	Rot-Weiß Oberhausen	33	(0)
2006–2008	Rot-Weiss Essen	38	(0)
2008–2009	Kickers Emden	37	(0)
2009–2011	SC Paderborn 07	57	(0)
2011–2015	Preußen Münster	124	(0)
- * Club domestic league appearances and goals as of 24 March 2017

Daniel Masuch (born 24 April 1977) is a German former professional footballer who played as a goalkeeper.
