= Rico Schmider =

German footballer

Personal information
- Date of birth: 24 June 1991 (age 35)
- Place of birth: Germany
- Position: Midfielder

Team information
- Current team: Kickers Offenbach
- Number: 8

Youth career
- –2010: SC Freiburg
- 2010: Karlsruher SC

Senior career*
Years	Team	Apps	(Gls)
2010–2013	Preußen Münster	20	(0)
2013–	Kickers Offenbach	0	(0)
- * Club domestic league appearances and goals as of 7 June 2013

Rico Schmider (born 24 June 1991) is a German footballer who currently plays for Kickers Offenbach.
