= List of VfL Bochum players =

== Key ==
- Players are listed according to the date of their first-team debut for the club.

=== Playing positions ===
GK	Goalkeeper	DF	Defender	MF	Midfielder	FW	Forward

== Players ==
=== Men ===
==== Prior to the 1949–50 season ====
- Players whose name is in italics have played for the club after to the 1948–49 season.

Player
Pos	Nat	Name	Years
FW	(West Germany)	Erich Menski	1938; 1943–1944
MF	(West Germany)	Klemens Chlupka	1938–1939
FW	(West Germany)	Willi Philipp	1938–1939
MF	(West Germany)	Paul Lasar	1938–1940
MF	(West Germany)	Pfeifer	~1938–1939
GK	(West Germany)	Piepenstock	~1938–1939
FW	(West Germany)	Hermann Schiefer	~1938–1941
DF	(West Germany)	Hans Wiemann	~1938–1941
FW	(West Germany)	Winkler	~1938–1941
FW	(West Germany)	Hans Gockel	~1938–1943
FW	(West Germany)	Bernhard Rudzinski	~1938–1944
GK	(West Germany)	Alois Lasarski	~1938–1946
FW	(West Germany)	Paul Mika	~1938–1946
MF	(West Germany)	Andreas Pawlowski (Andreas)	~1938–1946
DF	(West Germany)	August Trawny	~1938–1946
FW	(West Germany)	Johann Ananias	1938–1948
MF	(West Germany)	Siegfried Schneider (Schneider I)	1938–1941; 1945–1951
DF	(West Germany)	Erwin Schneider (Schneider II)	1938–1946; 1948–1956
MF	(West Germany)	Fritz Hecker	1939–
MF	(West Germany)	Fritz Hillemann	1939–
FW	(West Germany)	Ernst Moog	1940
FW	(West Germany)	Jeschke	~1940–1941
MF	(West Germany)	Kücke	~1940–1941
FW	(West Germany)	Marzelewski	~1940–1941
MF	(West Germany)	Roschkowski	~1940–1941
FW	(West Germany)	Paßgang	~1940–1942
MF	(West Germany)	Simon	~1940–1942
MF	(West Germany)	Richard Rosendahl	~1940–1943
FW	(West Germany)	Sandkühler	~1940–1944
MF	(West Germany)	Günter Schneider (Schneider III)	~1940–1944
MF	(West Germany)	Kurt Bonin	1941–
DF	(West Germany)	Erwin Brodzinski	1941–
FW	(West Germany)	Günter Lurz	1941–
FW	(West Germany)	Georg Hochgesang	~1941-1942
FW	(West Germany)	Jaksch	~1941–1942
MF	(West Germany)	Siegfried Kalinka	1942–1944
FW	(West Germany)	Georg Hecht	~1943-1944
DF	(West Germany)	Willi Kalfelder	1944
GK	(West Germany)	Schnitter	1944
MF	(West Germany)	Lampe	~1946–1947
FW	(West Germany)	Ulbrich	~1946–1947
FW	(West Germany)	Helmut Kalinka	1947–1955
DF	(Germany)	Erwin Brodzinski	1950
GK	(Germany)	Hans Vieth	1950
GK	(Germany)	Franz Polzin	1950-1951
MF	(Germany)	Kurt Bonin	1951
DF	(Germany)	Günter Lurz	1951
MF	(Germany)	Siegfried Schneider (Schneider I)	1951
MF	(Germany)	Josef Jendreiczak	1952
GK	(Germany)	Herbert Jochheim	1952
FW	(Germany)	Karl-Heinz Mosakowski	1952
GK	(Germany)	Richard Duddek	1952-1954
FW	(Germany)	Gerd Schirrmacher	1952-1954
FW	(Germany)	Alfred Bernahl	1952-1956
MF	(Germany)	Herbert Heinemann	1953-1954
MF	(Germany)	Karl-Heinz Schulze-Frieling	1953-1956
MF	(Germany)	Karl-Heinz Bunzendahl	1953-1957
MF	(Germany)	Fritz Hecker	1954
FW	(Germany)	Horst Kraft	1954-1956
DF	(Germany)	Albert Nalenz	1954
FW	(Germany)	Werner Ocker	1955
MF	(Germany)	Gerhard Renzewitz (Renzewitz I)	1955-1958 1963-1966
FW	(Germany)	Rainer Hallwas	1955-1957
MF	(Germany)	Helmut Deis	1955-1964

==== Since the 1949–50 season ====
As of 7 June 2021

- Verbandsliga Westfalen promotion playoffs, regional cups (e.g. DFB-Pokal qualification rounds) and Intertoto Cup matches not included, therefore the overall statistics are incomplete.
- Players whose name is in italics may have played for the club prior to the 1949–50 season, therefore their total league statistics may be incomplete.
- Players whose name is in **bold** currently play for the club.

Player				Overall		League														Cup		League Cup		Continental		Other			
Player				Overall		1.BL		2.BL		RL-W		VL-W		1.OL-W		2.OL-W		Total		DFB-P		DFB-LP		UEFA cup		BL Playoffs		RL Playoffs	
Pos	Nat	Name	Years	A	G	A	G	A	G	A	G	A	G	A	G	A	G	A	G	A	G	A	G	A	G	A	G	A	G
DF	(West Germany)	Erwin Brodzinski	–1950	18	**2**	0	0	0	0	0	0	0	0	0	0	18	2	18	**2**	0	0	0	0	0	0	0	0	0	0
	(West Germany)	Willi Lippe	–1950	1	**0**	0	0	0	0	0	0	0	0	0	0	1	0	1	**0**	0	0	0	0	0	0	0	0	0	0
	(West Germany)	Müller I	–1950	2	**0**	0	0	0	0	0	0	0	0	0	0	2	0	2	**0**	0	0	0	0	0	0	0	0	0	0
	(West Germany)	Müller II	–1950	2	**0**	0	0	0	0	0	0	0	0	0	0	2	0	2	**0**	0	0	0	0	0	0	0	0	0	0
	(West Germany)	Pesalowski	–1950	1	**0**	0	0	0	0	0	0	0	0	0	0	1	0	1	**0**	0	0	0	0	0	0	0	0	0	0
	(West Germany)	Emil Pethöfer	–1950	15	**0**	0	0	0	0	0	0	0	0	0	0	15	0	15	**0**	0	0	0	0	0	0	0	0	0	0
GK	(West Germany)	Hans Vieth	–1950	1	**0**	0	0	0	0	0	0	0	0	0	0	1	0	1	**0**	0	0	0	0	0	0	0	0	0	0
	(West Germany)	Walter Wischnewski	–1950	1	**0**	0	0	0	0	0	0	0	0	0	0	1	0	1	**0**	0	0	0	0	0	0	0	0	0	0
FW	(West Germany)	Werner Beck	–1951	28	**2**	0	0	0	0	0	0	0	0	0	0	28	2	28	**2**	0	0	0	0	0	0	0	0	0	0
MF	(West Germany)	Kurt Bonin	–1951	27	**1**	0	0	0	0	0	0	0	0	0	0	27	1	27	**1**	0	0	0	0	0	0	0	0	0	0
DF	(West Germany)	Günter Lurz	–1951	59	**2**	0	0	0	0	0	0	0	0	0	0	59	2	59	**2**	0	0	0	0	0	0	0	0	0	0
	(West Germany)	Karl-Heinz Ortloff	–1951	3	**0**	0	0	0	0	0	0	0	0	0	0	3	0	3	**0**	0	0	0	0	0	0	0	0	0	0
MF	(West Germany)	Siegfried Schneider (Schneider I)	–1951	34	**1**	0	0	0	0	0	0	0	0	0	0	34	1	34	**1**	0	0	0	0	0	0	0	0	0	0
MF	(West Germany)	Josef Jendreiczak	–1952	40	**12**	0	0	0	0	0	0	0	0	0	0	40	12	40	**12**	0	0	0	0	0	0	0	0	0	0
GK	(West Germany)	Herbert Jochheim	–1952	35	**0**	0	0	0	0	0	0	0	0	0	0	35	0	35	**0**	0	0	0	0	0	0	0	0	0	0
FW	(West Germany)	Karl-Heinz Mosakowski	–1952	64	**22**	0	0	0	0	0	0	0	0	0	0	64	22	64	**22**	0	0	0	0	0	0	0	0	0	0
MF	(West Germany)	Fritz Hecker	–1954	87	**21**	0	0	0	0	0	0	0	0	3	0	84	21	87	**21**	0	0	0	0	0	0	0	0	0	0
DF	(West Germany)	Albert Nalenz	–1954	99	**13**	0	0	0	0	0	0	0	0	18	1	81	12	99	**13**	0	0	0	0	0	0	0	0	0	0
FW	(West Germany)	Helmut Kalinka	–1955	133	**53**	0	0	0	0	0	0	0	0	35	2	98	51	133	**53**	0	0	0	0	0	0	0	0	0	0
FW	(West Germany)	Werner Ocker	–1955	130	**49**	0	0	0	0	0	0	0	0	19	3	111	46	130	**49**	0	0	0	0	0	0	0	0	0	0
DF	(West Germany)	Erwin Schneider (Schneider II)	–1956	192	**4**	0	0	0	0	0	0	0	0	54	0	138	4	192	**4**	0	0	0	0	0	0	0	0	0	0
DF	(West Germany)	Fritz Hillemann	–1959	199	**1**	0	0	0	0	0	0	0	0	81	1	118	0	199	**1**	0	0	0	0	0	0	0	0	0	0
GK	(West Germany)	Franz Polzin	1950–1951	27	**0**	0	0	0	0	0	0	0	0	0	0	27	0	27	**0**	0	0	0	0	0	0	0	0	0	0
	(West Germany)	Helmut Rienermann	1950–1951	16	**0**	0	0	0	0	0	0	0	0	0	0	16	0	16	**0**	0	0	0	0	0	0	0	0	0	0
FW	(West Germany)	Ernst Koch	1950–1954	112	**45**	0	0	0	0	0	0	0	0	27	6	85	39	112	**45**	0	0	0	0	0	0	0	0	0	0
MF	(West Germany)	Ludwig Drangwitz	1950–1955	127	**2**	0	0	0	0	0	0	0	0	39	0	88	2	127	**2**	0	0	0	0	0	0	0	0	0	0
GK	(West Germany)	Karl Hagen	1951–1952	1	**0**	0	0	0	0	0	0	0	0	0	0	1	0	1	**0**	0	0	0	0	0	0	0	0	0	0
FW	(West Germany)	Harry Köhler	1951–1952	17	**7**	0	0	0	0	0	0	0	0	0	0	17	7	17	**7**	0	0	0	0	0	0	0	0	0	0
GK	(West Germany)	Karl-Heinz Theiß	1951–1953	31	**0**	0	0	0	0	0	0	0	0	0	0	31	0	31	**0**	0	0	0	0	0	0	0	0	0	0
MF	(West Germany)	Paul Ehlert	1951–1957	117	**2**	0	0	0	0	0	0	0	0	31	0	86	2	117	**2**	0	0	0	0	0	0	0	0	0	0
FW	(West Germany)	Wilhelm Keil	1952–1953	2	**0**	0	0	0	0	0	0	0	0	0	0	2	0	2	**0**	0	0	0	0	0	0	0	0	0	0
FW	(West Germany)	Heinz Liebers	1952–1953	4	**1**	0	0	0	0	0	0	0	0	0	0	4	1	4	**1**	0	0	0	0	0	0	0	0	0	0
GK	(West Germany)	Richard Duddek	1952–1954	53	**0**	0	0	0	0	0	0	0	0	27	0	26	0	53	**0**	0	0	0	0	0	0	0	0	0	0
FW	(West Germany)	Alfred Bernahl	1952–1956	29	**2**	0	0	0	0	0	0	0	0	9	1	20	1	29	**2**	0	0	0	0	0	0	0	0	0	0
FW	(West Germany)	Herbert Sturm	1952–1956	42	**2**	0	0	0	0	0	0	0	0	15	1	27	1	42	**2**	0	0	0	0	0	0	0	0	0	0
FW	(West Germany)	Gerd Schirrmacher	1952–1964	283	**88**	0	0	0	0	0	0	9	4	173	38	101	46	283	**88**	0	0	0	0	0	0	0	0	0	0
MF	(West Germany)	Herbert Heinemann	1953–1954	1	**0**	0	0	0	0	0	0	0	0	1	0	0	0	1	**0**	0	0	0	0	0	0	0	0	0	0
			1953–1954	13	**12**	0	0	0	0	0	0	0	0	13	12	0	0	13	**12**	0	0	0	0	0	0	0	0	0	0
FW	(West Germany)	Dieter Attern	1953–1955	51	**12**	0	0	0	0	0	0	0	0	51	12	0	0	51	**12**	0	0	0	0	0	0	0	0	0	0
FW	(West Germany)	Heinz Henke	1953–1955	43	**10**	0	0	0	0	0	0	0	0	43	10	0	0	43	**10**	0	0	0	0	0	0	0	0	0	0
MF	(West Germany)	Karl-Heinz Schulze-Frieling	1953–1956	58	**4**	0	0	0	0	0	0	0	0	54	4	4	0	58	**4**	0	0	0	0	0	0	0	0	0	0
MF	(West Germany)	Karl-Heinz Bunzendahl	1953–1957	64	**1**	0	0	0	0	0	0	0	0	44	0	20	1	64	**1**	0	0	0	0	0	0	0	0	0	0
GK	(West Germany)	Siegfried Tiedtke	1953–1961	172	**0**	0	0	0	0	0	0	0	0	150	0	22		172	**0**	0	0	0	0	0	0	0	0	0	0
FW	(West Germany)	Günther Knof	1954–1955	2	**1**	0	0	0	0	0	0	0	0	2	1	0		2	**1**	0	0	0	0	0	0	0	0	0	0
FW	(West Germany)	Horst Kraft	1954–1956	8	**0**	0	0	0	0	0	0	0	0	1	0	7		8	**0**	0	0	0	0	0	0	0	0	0	0
GK	(West Germany)	Winfried Lieder	1954–1956	12	**0**	0	0	0	0	0	0	0	0	4	0	8	0	12	**0**	0	0	0	0	0	0	0	0	0	0
	(West Germany)	Eugen Bühner	1954–1957	63	**25**	0	0	0	0	0	0	0	0	40	13	23	12	63	**25**	0	0	0	0	0	0	0	0	0	0
FW	(West Germany)	Kurt Handtke	1954–1957	5	**1**	0	0	0	0	0	0	0	0	3	0	2	1	5	**1**	0	0	0	0	0	0	0	0	0	0
FW	(West Germany)	Werner Warich	1954–1957	20	**13**	0	0	0	0	0	0	0	0	9	4	11	9	20	**13**	0	0	0	0	0	0	0	0	0	0
MF	(West Germany)	Erich Pawlak	1954–1961	161	**35**	0	0	0	0	0	0	0	0	131	33	30	2	161	**35**	0	0	0	0	0	0	0	0	0	0
FW	(West Germany)	Willy Möldgen	1955–1956	11	**1**	0	0	0	0	0	0	0	0	0	0	11	1	11	**1**	0	0	0	0	0	0	0	0	0	0
FW	(West Germany)	Rainer Hallwas	1955–1957	20	**11**	0	0	0	0	0	0	0	0	2	0	18	11	20	**11**	0	0	0	0	0	0	0	0	0	0
FW	(West Germany)	Herbert Kasperczak	1955–1957	39	**13**	0	0	0	0	0	0	0	0	11	4	28	9	39	**13**	0	0	0	0	0	0	0	0	0	0
DF	(West Germany)	Wolfgang Hartmann	1955–1958; 1959–1960	37	**1**	0	0	0	0	0	0	0	0	31	1	6	0	37	**1**	0	0	0	0	0	0	0	0	0	0
MF	(West Germany)	Gerhard Renzewitz (Renzewitz I)	1955–1958; 1963–1966	61	**6**	0	0	0	0	8	0	38	6	14	0	1	0	61	**6**	0	0	0	0	0	0	0	0	0	0
MF	(West Germany)	Helmut Deis	1955–1964	207	**29**	0	0	0	0	0	0	5	0	121	19	80	10	206	**29**	1	0	0	0	0	0	0	0	0	0
FW	(West Germany)	Gerhard Süß	1956–1957	5	**1**	0	0	0	0	0	0	0	0	5	1	0	0	5	**1**	0	0	0	0	0	0	0	0	0	0
DF	(West Germany)	Udo Remmert	1956–1958	35	**0**	0	0	0	0	0	0	0	0	35	0	0	0	35	**0**	0	0	0	0	0	0	0	0	0	0
MF	(West Germany)	Günter Schöttler	1956–1958	11	**3**	0	0	0	0	0	0	0	0	11	3	0	0	11	**3**	0	0	0	0	0	0	0	0	0	0
MF	(West Germany)	Adolf Hille	1956–1960	47	**2**	0	0	0	0	0	0	0	0	47	2	0	0	47	**2**	0	0	0	0	0	0	0	0	0	0
DF	(West Germany)	August Liese	1956–1960	60	**4**	0	0	0	0	0	0	0	0	60	4	0	0	60	**4**	0	0	0	0	0	0	0	0	0	0
FW	(West Germany)	Gerd Hohmann	1956–1961	114	**39**	0	0	0	0	0	0	0	0	114	39	0	0	114	**39**	0	0	0	0	0	0	0	0	0	0
FW	(West Germany)	Theodor Bergmeier	1956–1962	101	**34**	0	0	0	0	0	0	0	0	99	34	2	0	101	**34**	0	0	0	0	0	0	0	0	0	0
MF	(West Germany)	Horst Renzewitz (Renzewitz II)	1957–1958	1	**0**	0	0	0	0	0	0	0	0	1	0	0	0	1	**0**	0	0	0	0	0	0	0	0	0	0
FW	(West Germany)	Rolf Klein	1957–1958; 1959–1960	3	**1**	0	0	0	0	0	0	0	0	3	1	0	0	3	**1**	0	0	0	0	0	0	0	0	0	0
DF	(West Germany)	Lothar Geisler	1957–1959	52	**0**	0	0	0	0	0	0	0	0	52	0	0	0	52	**0**	0	0	0	0	0	0	0	0	0	0
FW	(West Germany)	Hans Bieda	1957–1960	24	**6**	0	0	0	0	0	0	0	0	24	6	0	0	24	**6**	0	0	0	0	0	0	0	0	0	0
FW	(West Germany)	Wilhelm Koppmann	1957–1960	20	**7**	0	0	0	0	0	0	0	0	20	7	0	0	20	**7**	0	0	0	0	0	0	0	0	0	0
DF	(West Germany)	Heinz van den Hövel	1957–1961	93	**0**	0	0	0	0	0	0	0	0	93	0	0	0	93	**0**	0	0	0	0	0	0	0	0	0	0
FW	(West Germany)	Dieter Backhaus	1957–1962	87	**23**	0	0	0	0	0	0	0	0	73	20	13	2	86	**22**	1	1	0	0	0	0	0	0	0	0
DF	(West Germany)	Heinz Lowin	1957–1962	125	**2**	0	0	0	0	0	0	0	0	99	2	26	0	125	**2**	0	0	0	0	0	0	0	0	0	0
MF	(West Germany)	Winfried Micke	1958–1959	1	**0**	0	0	0	0	0	0	0	0	1	0	0	0	1	**0**	0	0	0	0	0	0	0	0	0	0
FW	(West Germany)	Rolf Serwatkiewicz	1958–1959	4	**2**	0	0	0	0	0	0	0	0	4	2	0	0	4	**2**	0	0	0	0	0	0	0	0	0	0
FW	(West Germany)	Alfons Dyniak	1958–1960	26	**7**	0	0	0	0	0	0	0	0	26	7	0	0	26	**7**	0	0	0	0	0	0	0	0	0	0
MF	(West Germany)	Harry Linka	1958–1963	118	**20**	0	0	0	0	0	0	0	0	84	16	33	4	117	**20**	1	0	0	0	0	0	0	0	0	0
GK	(West Germany)	Manfred Tkotz	1959–1960	1	**0**	0	0	0	0	0	0	0	0	1	0	0	0	1	**0**	0	0	0	0	0	0	0	0	0	0
MF	(West Germany)	Otto Keller	1959–1963	81	**15**	0	0	0	0	0	0	0	0	42	9	38	6	80	**15**	1	0	0	0	0	0	0	0	0	0
DF	(West Germany)	Richard Will	1959–1963	104	**1**	0	0	0	0	0	0	0	0	46	0	57	1	103	**1**	1	0	0	0	0	0	0	0	0	0
DF	(West Germany)	Dieter Trawny	1959–1965	138	**11**	0	0	0	0	0	0	36	6	42	2	59	3	137	**11**	1	0	0	0	0	0	0	0	0	0
DF	(West Germany)	Roland Kaufmann	1960–1961	1	**0**	0	0	0	0	0	0	0	0	1	0	0	0	1	**0**	0	0	0	0	0	0	0	0	0	0
DF	(West Germany)	Alfons Rips	1960–1961	1	**0**	0	0	0	0	0	0	0	0	1	0	0	0	1	**0**	0	0	0	0	0	0	0	0	0	0
MF	(West Germany)	Felix Pagojus	1960–1962; 1964–1965	24	**8**	0	0	0	0	0	0	2	1	7	1	14	6	23	**8**	1	0	0	0	0	0	0	0	0	0
MF	(West Germany)	Norbert Kurtenbach	1960–1963	58	**25**	0	0	0	0	0	0	0	0	2	0	55	24	57	**24**	1	1	0	0	0	0	0	0	0	0
FW	(West Germany)	Karl-Heinz Rosenblatt	1960–1964	31	**6**	0	0	0	0	0	0	5	0	7	1	19	5	31	**6**	0	0	0	0	0	0	0	0	0	0
GK	(West Germany)	Heinz Streckbein	1960–1964	56	**0**	0	0	0	0	0	0	2	0	28	0	25	0	55	**0**	1	0	0	0	0	0	0	0	0	0
MF	(West Germany)	Werner Jablonski	1960–1973	300	**60**	8	0	0	0	168	12	45	18	26	6	45	24	292	**60**	3	0	0	0	0	0	0	0	5	0
	(West Germany)	Karl-Heinz Bollmann	1961–1962	4	**0**	0	0	0	0	0	0	0	0	0	0	4	0	4	**0**	0	0	0	0	0	0	0	0	0	0
MF	(West Germany)	Roman Hilse	1961–1962	19	**4**	0	0	0	0	0	0	0	0	0	0	18	4	18	**4**	1	0	0	0	0	0	0	0	0	0
	(West Germany)	Anton Skaro	1961–1962	2	**1**	0	0	0	0	0	0	0	0	0	0	2	1	2	**1**	0	0	0	0	0	0	0	0	0	0
GK	(West Germany)	Artur Böhnisch	1961–1963	23	**0**	0	0	0	0	0	0	0	0	0	0	23	0	23	**0**	0	0	0	0	0	0	0	0	0	0
FW	(West Germany)	Heinz-Günther Gropp	1961–1964	23	**11**	0	0	0	0	0	0	3	1	0	0	20	10	23	**11**	0	0	0	0	0	0	0	0	0	0
DF	(West Germany)	Dieter Vogel	1961–1968	113	**6**	0	0	0	0	58	0	49	6	0	0	6	0	113	**6**	0	0	0	0	0	0	0	0	0	0
DF	(West Germany)	Gerd Wiesemes	1961–1972	295	**4**	9	0	0	0	185	4	54	0	0	0	27	0	275	**4**	6	0	0	0	0	0	0	0	14	0
FW	(West Germany)	Karlheinz Hengesberg	1962–1963	2	**0**	0	0	0	0	0	0	0	0	0	0	2	0	2	**0**	0	0	0	0	0	0	0	0	0	0
GK	(West Germany)	Lange	1962–1963	12	**0**	0	0	0	0	0	0	0	0	0	0	12	0	12	**0**	0	0	0	0	0	0	0	0	0	0
MF	(West Germany)	Egon Milder	1962–1963	23	**2**	0	0	0	0	0	0	0	0	0	0	23	2	23	**2**	0	0	0	0	0	0	0	0	0	0
	(West Germany)	Klaus Stuke	1962–1963	2	**1**	0	0	0	0	0	0	0	0	0	0	2	1	2	**1**	0	0	0	0	0	0	0	0	0	0
	(West Germany)	Horst Dieberg	1962–1964	14	**1**	0	0	0	0	0	0	13	0	0	0	1	1	14	**1**	0	0	0	0	0	0	0	0	0	0
	(West Germany)	Oskar Wandelt	1962–1964	3	**0**	0	0	0	0	0	0	2	0	0	0	1	0	3	**0**	0	0	0	0	0	0	0	0	0	0
MF	(West Germany)	Walter Zastrau	1962–1964	48	**1**	0	0	0	0	0	0	19	1	0	0	29	0	48	**1**	0	0	0	0	0	0	0	0	0	0
	(West Germany)	Gerd Kamplade	1962–1965	5	**3**	0	0	0	0	0	0	4	2	0	0	1	1	5	**3**	0	0	0	0	0	0	0	0	0	0
DF	(West Germany)	Reinhard Kawa	1962–1967	24	**0**	0	0	0	0	5	0	16	0	0	0	3	0	24	**0**	0	0	0	0	0	0	0	0	0	0
	(West Germany)	Finger	1963–1964	15	**3**	0	0	0	0	0	0	15	3	0	0	0	0	15	**3**	0	0	0	0	0	0	0	0	0	0
	(West Germany)	Klein	1963–1964	1	**1**	0	0	0	0	0	0	1	1	0	0	0	0	1	**1**	0	0	0	0	0	0	0	0	0	0
	(West Germany)	Steinhoff	1963–1964	9	**0**	0	0	0	0	0	0	9	0	0	0	0	0	9	**0**	0	0	0	0	0	0	0	0	0	0
	(West Germany)	Jürgen Vallender	1963–1964	1	**0**	0	0	0	0	0	0	1	0	0	0	0	0	1	**0**	0	0	0	0	0	0	0	0	0	0
FW	(West Germany)	Manfred Wagener	1963–1964	29	**15**	0	0	0	0	0	0	29	15	0	0	0	0	29	**15**	0	0	0	0	0	0	0	0	0	0
	(West Germany)	Wagner	1963–1964	1	**0**	0	0	0	0	0	0	1	0	0	0	0	0	1	**0**	0	0	0	0	0	0	0	0	0	0
	(West Germany)	Kirchhoff	1963–1965	33	**0**	0	0	0	0	0	0	33	0	0	0	0	0	33	**0**	0	0	0	0	0	0	0	0	0	0
	(West Germany)	Walter Pommerin	1963–1966	27	**6**	0	0	0	0	1	0	26	6	0	0	0	0	27	**6**	0	0	0	0	0	0	0	0	0	0
FW	(West Germany)	Josef Schoppen	1963–1967	60	**28**	0	0	0	0	13	5	47	23	0	0	0	0	60	**28**	0	0	0	0	0	0	0	0	0	0
GK	(West Germany)	Horst Christopeit	1963–1969	161	**0**	0	0	0	0	99	0	58	0	0	0	0	0	157	**0**	4	0	0	0	0	0	0	0	0	0
DF	(West Germany)	Heinz Hermani	1963–1969	98	**2**	0	0	0	0	62	2	34	0	0	0	0	0	96	**2**	2	0	0	0	0	0	0	0	0	0
DF	(West Germany)	Dieter Versen	1963–1979	354	**21**	158	4	0	0	134	12	25	2	0	0	0	0	317	**18**	20	1	1	0	0	0	0	0	16	2
	(West Germany)	Krause	1964–1965	1	**0**	0	0	0	0	0	0	1	0	0	0	0	0	1	**0**	0	0	0	0	0	0	0	0	0	0
	(West Germany)	Ludwig	1964–1965	7	**3**	0	0	0	0	0	0	7	3	0	0	0	0	7	**3**	0	0	0	0	0	0	0	0	0	0
	(West Germany)	Metzler	1964–1965	1	**0**	0	0	0	0	0	0	1	0	0	0	0	0	1	**0**	0	0	0	0	0	0	0	0	0	0
GK	(West Germany)	Alfons Nierfeld	1964–1966	2	**0**	0	0	0	0	0	0	2	0	0	0	0	0	2	**0**	0	0	0	0	0	0	0	0	0	0
MF	(West Germany)	Manfred Prager	1964–1965	3	**0**	0	0	0	0	0	0	3	0	0	0	0	0	3	**0**	0	0	0	0	0	0	0	0	0	0
	(West Germany)	Rips	1964–1965	1	**0**	0	0	0	0	0	0	1	0	0	0	0	0	1	**0**	0	0	0	0	0	0	0	0	0	0
FW	(West Germany)	Hans-Dieter Dombrowski	1964–1966	12	**2**	0	0	0	0	7	1	5	1	0	0	0	0	12	**2**	0	0	0	0	0	0	0	0	0	0
FW	(West Germany)	Jürgen Steinmann	1964–1967	27	**3**	0	0	0	0	11	2	16	1	0	0	0	0	27	**3**	0	0	0	0	0	0	0	0	0	0
MF	(West Germany)	Karl-Heinz Böttcher	1964–1968	113	**43**	0	0	0	0	86	27	22	13	0	0	0	0	108	**40**	5	3	0	0	0	0	0	0	0	0
MF	(West Germany)	Gustav Eversberg	1964–1969	141	**76**	0	0	0	0	106	55	31	20	0	0	0	0	137	**75**	4	1	0	0	0	0	0	0	0	0
MF	(West Germany)	Dieter Moritz	1964–1969	78	**0**	0	0	0	0	64	0	12	0	0	0	0	0	76	**0**	2	0	0	0	0	0	0	0	0	0
	(West Germany)	Horst Matschiske	1965–1966	1	**0**	0	0	0	0	1	0	0	0	0	0	0	0	1	**0**	0	0	0	0	0	0	0	0	0	0
MF	(West Germany)	Franz Mitula	1965–1966	12	**0**	0	0	0	0	12	0	0	0	0	0	0	0	12	**0**	0	0	0	0	0	0	0	0	0	0
MF	(West Germany)	Günter Groß	1965–1970	56	**11**	0	0	0	0	55	11	0	0	0	0	0	0	55	**11**	1	0	0	0	0	0	0	0	0	0
MF	(West Germany)	Hans Grieger	1965–1971	144	**26**	0	0	0	0	136	22	0	0	0	0	0	0	136	**22**	0	0	0	0	0	0	0	0	8	4
DF	(West Germany)	Heinz-Jürgen Blome	1965–1973	168	**1**	16	0	0	0	128	1	0	0	0	0	0	0	144	**1**	7	0	4	0	0	0	0	0	13	0
DF	(West Germany)	Erwin Galeski	1965–1975	207	**18**	86	0	0	0	97	17	0	0	0	0	0	0	183	**17**	6	1	5	0	0	0	0	0	13	0
GK	(West Germany)	Joachim Balz	1966–1967	1	**0**	0	0	0	0	1	0	0	0	0	0	0	0	1	**0**	0	0	0	0	0	0	0	0	0	0
MF	(West Germany)	Albert Dapprich	1966–1968	15	**4**	0	0	0	0	15	4	0	0	0	0	0	0	15	**4**	0	0	0	0	0	0	0	0	0	0
FW	(West Germany)	Heinz Höher	1966–1970	78	**21**	0	0	0	0	70	20	0	0	0	0	0	0	70	**20**	3	0	0	0	0	0	0	0	5	1
FW	(West Germany)	Dieter Klever	1966–1970	99	**16**	0	0	0	0	90	15	0	0	0	0	0	0	90	**15**	1	1	0	0	0	0	0	0	8	0
MF	(West Germany)	Werner Balte	1966–1977	321	**112**	170	38	0	0	106	57	0	0	0	0	0	0	276	**95**	26	10	6	4	0	0	0	0	13	3
DF	(West Germany)	Jürgen Gelhaus	1967–1968	1	**0**	0	0	0	0	1	0	0	0	0	0	0	0	1	**0**	0	0	0	0	0	0	0	0	0	0
GK	(West Germany)	Udo Maslo	1967–1968	3	**0**	0	0	0	0	2	0	0	0	0	0	0	0	2	**0**	1	0	0	0	0	0	0	0	0	0
MF	(West Germany)	Hans-Jürgen Jansen	1967–1971	140	**19**	0	0	0	0	125	17	0	0	0	0	0	0	125	**17**	5	1	0	0	0	0	0	0	10	1
MF	(West Germany)	Erich Schiller	1967–1971	63	**5**	0	0	0	0	55	5	0	0	0	0	0	0	55	**5**	5	0	0	0	0	0	0	0	3	0
FW	(West Germany)	Karl-Heinz Dombrowski	1968–1969	6	**0**	0	0	0	0	6	0	0	0	0	0	0	0	6	**0**	0	0	0	0	0	0	0	0	0	0
FW	(West Germany)	Harry Griesbeck	1968–1970	57	**9**	0	0	0	0	50	9	0	0	0	0	0	0	50	**9**	0	0	0	0	0	0	0	0	7	0
GK	(West Germany)	Theo Diegelmann	1968–1971	89	**0**	0	0	0	0	80	0	0	0	0	0	0	0	80	**0**	0	0	0	0	0	0	0	0	9	0
DF	(West Germany)	Johann Sabath	1969–1970	13	**0**	0	0	0	0	13	0	0	0	0	0	0	0	13	**0**	0	0	0	0	0	0	0	0	0	0
FW	(West Germany)	Dieter Fern	1969–1972	111	**15**	32	2	0	0	59	10	0	0	0	0	0	0	91	**12**	4	0	0	0	0	0	0	0	16	3
MF	(West Germany)	Werner Krämer	1969–1973	119	**14**	39	3	0	0	63	8	0	0	0	0	0	0	102	**11**	5	2	0	0	0	0	0	0	12	1
FW	(West Germany)	Hans Walitza	1969–1974	197	**135**	99	53	0	0	67	59	0	0	0	0	0	0	166	**112**	10	6	5	2	0	0	0	0	16	15
DF	(West Germany)	Manfred Berens	1970–1971	0	**0**	0	0	0	0	0	0	0	0	0	0	0	0	0	**0**	0	0	0	0	0	0	0	0	0	0
MF	(West Germany)	Reinhard Pommorin	1970–1971	5	**0**	0	0	0	0	4	0	0	0	0	0	0	0	4	**0**	0	0	0	0	0	0	0	0	1	0
FW	(West Germany)	Hans-Werner Hartl	1970–1973	86	**39**	39	13	0	0	32	18	0	0	0	0	0	0	71	**31**	4	0	3	1	0	0	0	0	8	7
MF	(West Germany)	Klaus-Peter Kerkemeier	1970–1973	0	**0**	0	0	0	0	0	0	0	0	0	0	0	0	0	**0**	0	0	0	0	0	0	0	0	0	0
DF	(West Germany)	Manfred Rüsing	1970-1973	71	**1**	36	0	0	0	26	0	0	0	0	0	0	0	62	**0**	5	1	0	0	0	0	0	0	4	0
MF	(West Germany)	Hans-Günter Etterich	1970–1974	92	**11**	72	10	0	0	5	0	0	0	0	0	0	0	77	**10**	8	1	4	0	0	0	0	0	3	0
GK	(West Germany)	Hans-Jürgen Bradler	1970–1975	80	**0**	44	0	0	0	22	0	0	0	0	0	0	0	66	**0**	5	0	1	0	0	0	0	0	8	0
MF	(West Germany)	Harry Fechner	1970–1976	117	**4**	84	4	0	0	14	0	0	0	0	0	0	0	98	**4**	10	0	6	0	0	0	0	0	3	0
MF	(West Germany)	Hans-Jürgen Köper	1970–1980	198	**28**	145	17	0	0	26	5	0	0	0	0	0	0	171	**22**	18	4	4	2	0	0	0	0	5	0
MF	(West Germany)	Udo Böckmann	1971–1972	3	**0**	1	0	0	0	0	0	0	0	0	0	0	0	1	**0**	0	0	2	0	0	0	0	0	0	0
DF	(West Germany)	Dieter Zorc	1971–1972	30	**1**	21	0	0	0	0	0	0	0	0	0	0	0	21	**0**	4	0	5	1	0	0	0	0	0	0
DF	(West Germany)	Reinhold Wosab	1971–1973	68	**10**	59	9	0	0	0	0	0	0	0	0	0	0	59	**9**	7	1	2	0	0	0	0	0	0	0
GK	(West Germany)	Harry Bohrmann	1971–1974	1	**0**	1	0	0	0	0	0	0	0	0	0	0	0	1	**0**	0	0	0	0	0	0	0	0	0	0
MF	(West Germany)	Franz-Josef Laufer	1971–1974	52	**1**	44	0	0	0	0	0	0	0	0	0	0	0	44	**0**	3	1	5	0	0	0	0	0	0	0
FW	(West Germany)	Peter Bomm	1972–1974	5	**2**	3	2	0	0	0	0	0	0	0	0	0	0	3	**2**	1	0	1	0	0	0	0	0	0	0
FW	(West Germany)	Reinhard Majgl	1972–1974	52	**13**	44	10	0	0	0	0	0	0	0	0	0	0	44	**10**	2	1	6	2	0	0	0	0	0	0
MF	(West Germany)	Klaus-Dieter Dewinski	1972–1976	27	**1**	19	1	0	0	0	0	0	0	0	0	0	0	19	**1**	7	0	1	0	0	0	0	0	0	0
DF	(West Germany)	Michael Eggert	1972–1980	229	**26**	206	26	0	0	0	0	0	0	0	0	0	0	206	**26**	23	0	0	0	0	0	0	0	0	0
GK	(West Germany)	Werner Scholz	1972–1981	237	**0**	207	0	0	0	0	0	0	0	0	0	0	0	207	**0**	24	0	6	0	0	0	0	0	0	0
DF	(West Germany)	Hermann Gerland	1972–1985	234	**7**	204	4	0	0	0	0	0	0	0	0	0	0	204	**4**	25	2	5	1	0	0	0	0	0	0
DF	(West Germany)	Michael Lameck	1972–1988	585	**44**	518	37	0	0	0	0	0	0	0	0	0	0	518	**37**	61	7	6	0	0	0	0	0	0	0
DF	(West Germany)	Hartmut Fromm	1973–1977	107	**7**	93	4	0	0	0	0	0	0	0	0	0	0	93	**4**	14	3	0	0	0	0	0	0	0	0
FW	(West Germany)	Heinz-Werner Eggeling	1973–1979	163	**25**	147	20	0	0	0	0	0	0	0	0	0	0	147	**20**	16	5	0	0	0	0	0	0	0	0
DF	(West Germany)	Franz-Josef Tenhagen	1973–1981; 1984–1988	341	**23**	307	20	0	0	0	0	0	0	0	0	0	0	307	**20**	34	3	0	0	0	0	0	0	0	0
MF	(Greece)	Fotios Papadopoulos	1974	2	0	2	0	0	0	0	0	0	0	0	0	0	0	2	**0**	0	0	0	0	0	0	0	0	0	0
MF	(West Germany)	Gisbert Horsthemke	1974–1975	2	**0**	2	0	0	0	0	0	0	0	0	0	0	0	2	**0**	0	0	0	0	0	0	0	0	0	0
MF	(West Germany)	Paul Holz	1974–1975; 1976–1979	111	**15**	99	13	0	0	0	0	0	0	0	0	0	0	99	**13**	12	2	0	0	0	0	0	0	0	0
DF	(West Germany)	Klaus Franke	1974–1978	113	**1**	104	1	0	0	0	0	0	0	0	0	0	0	104	**1**	9	0	0	0	0	0	0	0	0	0
FW	(West Germany)	Hans-Joachim Pochstein	1974–1979	115	**8**	99	6	0	0	0	0	0	0	0	0	0	0	99	**6**	16	2	0	0	0	0	0	0	0	0
FW	(West Germany)	Josef Kaczor	1974–1980	157	**64**	142	51	0	0	0	0	0	0	0	0	0	0	142	**51**	15	13	0	0	0	0	0	0	0	0
FW	(West Germany)	Harry Ellbracht	1975–1976	23	**9**	21	8	0	0	0	0	0	0	0	0	0	0	21	**8**	2	1	0	0	0	0	0	0	0	0
DF	(West Germany)	Erich Miß	1975–1976	25	**1**	23	1	0	0	0	0	0	0	0	0	0	0	23	**1**	2	0	0	0	0	0	0	0	0	0
FW	(West Germany)	Peter Kursinski	1975–1977	10	**0**	10	0	0	0	0	0	0	0	0	0	0	0	10	**0**	0	0	0	0	0	0	0	0	0	0
MF	(West Germany)	Holger Trimhold	1975–1979	117	**12**	105	11	0	0	0	0	0	0	0	0	0	0	105	**11**	12	1	0	0	0	0	0	0	0	0
MF	(West Germany)	Wolfgang Euteneuer	1976–1977	7	**0**	5	0	0	0	0	0	0	0	0	0	0	0	5	**0**	2	0	0	0	0	0	0	0	0	0
DF	(West Germany)	Matthias Herget	1976–1978	71	**2**	64	2	0	0	0	0	0	0	0	0	0	0	64	**2**	7	0	0	0	0	0	0	0	0	0
GK	(West Germany)	Reinhard Mager	1976–1984	128	**0**	114	0	0	0	0	0	0	0	0	0	0	0	114	**0**	14	0	0	0	0	0	0	0	0	0
FW	(West Germany)	Ralf Schaffeld	1977–1978	1	**0**	1	0	0	0	0	0	0	0	0	0	0	0	1	**0**	0	0	0	0	0	0	0	0	0	0
FW	(West Germany)	Dieter Schwemmle	1977–1978	18	**3**	15	0	0	0	0	0	0	0	0	0	0	0	15	**0**	3	3	0	0	0	0	0	0	0	0
DF	(West Germany)	Klaus Wischniewski	1977–1978	12	**1**	12	1	0	0	0	0	0	0	0	0	0	0	12	**1**	0	0	0	0	0	0	0	0	0	0
FW	(West Germany)	Hans-Joachim Abel	1977–1982	162	**73**	144	60	0	0	0	0	0	0	0	0	0	0	144	**60**	18	13	0	0	0	0	0	0	0	0
DF	(West Germany)	Dieter Bast	1977–1983	220	**31**	192	24	0	0	0	0	0	0	0	0	0	0	192	**24**	28	7	0	0	0	0	0	0	0	0
DF	(West Germany)	Lothar Woelk	1977–1989	431	**35**	385	26	0	0	0	0	0	0	0	0	0	0	385	**26**	46	9	0	0	0	0	0	0	0	0
MF	(West Germany)	Rolf Blau	1978–1982	138	**16**	123	14	0	0	0	0	0	0	0	0	0	0	123	**14**	15	2	0	0	0	0	0	0	0	0
DF	(Germany)	Walter Oswald	1978–1991	396	**31**	353	24	0	0	0	0	0	0	0	0	0	0	353	**24**	41	7	0	0	0	0	2	0	0	0
FW	(West Germany)	Werner Schachten	1979	3	**0**	3	0	0	0	0	0	0	0	0	0	0	0	3	**0**	0	0	0	0	0	0	0	0	0	0
MF	(Socialist Federal Republic of Yugoslavia)	Luka Bonačić	1979–1980	11	**0**	10	0	0	0	0	0	0	0	0	0	0	0	10	**0**	1	0	0	0	0	0	0	0	0	0
MF	(West Germany)	Lutz Gerresheim	1979–1980	7	**0**	5	0	0	0	0	0	0	0	0	0	0	0	5	**0**	2	0	0	0	0	0	0	0	0	0
FW	(West Germany)	Ottmar Scheuch	1979–1980	3	**0**	2	0	0	0	0	0	0	0	0	0	0	0	2	**0**	1	0	0	0	0	0	0	0	0	0
MF	(West Germany)	Ulrich Bittorf	1979–1980; 1981–1982	45	**5**	36	4	0	0	0	0	0	0	0	0	0	0	36	**4**	9	1	0	0	0	0	0	0	0	0
FW	(West Germany)	Kurt Pinkall	1979–1981	43	**22**	39	19	0	0	0	0	0	0	0	0	0	0	39	**19**	4	3	0	0	0	0	0	0	0	0
DF	(West Germany)	Heinz Knüwe	1979–1986	217	**22**	197	19	0	0	0	0	0	0	0	0	0	0	197	**19**	20	3	0	0	0	0	0	0	0	0
DF	(West Germany)	Detlef Jaskowiak	1980	1	**0**	0	0	0	0	0	0	0	0	0	0	0	0	0	**0**	1	0	0	0	0	0	0	0	0	0
MF	(Switzerland)	Christian Gross	1980–1981	33	**6**	29	4	0	0	0	0	0	0	0	0	0	0	29	**4**	4	2	0	0	0	0	0	0	0	0
FW	(West Germany)	Dieter Lemke	1980–1982	33	**2**	27	1	0	0	0	0	0	0	0	0	0	0	27	**1**	6	1	0	0	0	0	0	0	0	0
DF	(West Germany)	Michael Jakobs	1980–1983	103	**2**	88	2	0	0	0	0	0	0	0	0	0	0	88	**2**	15	0	0	0	0	0	0	0	0	0
DF	(Socialist Federal Republic of Yugoslavia)	Ivan Žugčić	1980–1987	104	**2**	97	2	0	0	0	0	0	0	0	0	0	0	97	**2**	7	0	0	0	0	0	0	0	0	0
MF	(West Germany)	Klaus Zagorny	1981	1	**1**	0	0	0	0	0	0	0	0	0	0	0	0	0	**0**	1	1	0	0	0	0	0	0	0	0
FW	(West Germany)	Frank Eggeling	1981–1982	6	**0**	5	0	0	0	0	0	0	0	0	0	0	0	5	**0**	1	0	0	0	0	0	0	0	0	0
MF	(West Germany)	Wolfgang Patzke	1981–1983	69	**22**	59	21	0	0	0	0	0	0	0	0	0	0	59	**21**	10	1	0	0	0	0	0	0	0	0
DF	(West Germany)	Bernd Storck	1981–1983	29	**2**	24	1	0	0	0	0	0	0	0	0	0	0	24	**1**	5	1	0	0	0	0	0	0	0	0
FW	(West Germany)	Christian Schreier	1981–1984	110	**42**	98	35	0	0	0	0	0	0	0	0	0	0	98	**35**	12	7	0	0	0	0	0	0	0	0
MF	(West Germany)	Reinhold Zagorny	1981–1984	21	**1**	16	0	0	0	0	0	0	0	0	0	0	0	16	**0**	5	1	0	0	0	0	0	0	0	0
MF	(West Germany)	Michael Kühn	1981–1987	79	**8**	73	8	0	0	0	0	0	0	0	0	0	0	73	**8**	6	0	0	0	0	0	0	0	0	0
GK	(Germany)	Ralf Zumdick	1981–1996	310	**1**	282	1	1	0	0	0	0	0	0	0	0	0	283	**1**	27	0	0	0	0	0	0	0	0	0
FW	(West Germany)	Frank Islacker	1982	3	**0**	3	0	0	0	0	0	0	0	0	0	0	0	3	**0**	0	0	0	0	0	0	0	0	0	0
MF	(West Germany)	Dieter Kramer	1982–1983	7	**0**	6	0	0	0	0	0	0	0	0	0	0	0	6	**0**	1	0	0	0	0	0	0	0	0	0
MF	(West Germany)	Andreas Bordan	1982–1984	4	**0**	3	0	0	0	0	0	0	0	0	0	0	0	3	0	1	0	0	0	0	0	0	0	0	0
FW	(West Germany)	Detlef Krella	1982–1984	25	**2**	23	1	0	0	0	0	0	0	0	0	0	0	23	**1**	2	1	0	0	0	0	0	0	0	0
FW	(West Germany)	Stefan Pater	1982–1984	62	**9**	59	8	0	0	0	0	0	0	0	0	0	0	59	**8**	3	1	0	0	0	0	0	0	0	0
MF	(Germany)	Frank Benatelli	1982–1993	206	**14**	192	13	0	0	0	0	0	0	0	0	0	0	192	**13**	14	1	0	0	0	0	0	0	0	0
FW	(Sweden)	Thomas Andersson	1983	5	**0**	5	0	0	0	0	0	0	0	0	0	0	0	5	**0**	0	0	0	0	0	0	0	0	0	0
DF	(West Germany)	Bernd Gerber	1983–1984	5	**0**	4	0	0	0	0	0	0	0	0	0	0	0	4	**0**	1	0	0	0	0	0	0	0	0	0
MF	(West Germany)	Peter Grünberger	1983–1984	7	**0**	7	0	0	0	0	0	0	0	0	0	0	0	7	**0**	0	0	0	0	0	0	0	0	0	0
FW	(West Germany)	Günter Habig	1983–1984	0	**0**	0	0	0	0	0	0	0	0	0	0	0	0	0	**0**	0	0	0	0	0	0	0	0	0	0
DF	(West Germany)	Florian Gothe	1983–1985	28	**1**	27	1	0	0	0	0	0	0	0	0	0	0	27	**1**	1	0	0	0	0	0	0	0	0	0
DF	(West Germany)	Siegfried Bönighausen	1983–1986	50	**3**	48	3	0	0	0	0	0	0	0	0	0	0	48	**3**	2	0	0	0	0	0	0	0	0	0
FW	(Germany)	Stefan Kuntz	1983–1986; 1998–1999	130	**50**	120	47	0	0	0	0	0	0	0	0	0	0	120	**47**	10	3	0	0	0	0	0	0	0	0
MF	(West Germany)	Frank Schulz	1983–1987	124	**31**	116	30	0	0	0	0	0	0	0	0	0	0	116	**30**	8	1	0	0	0	0	0	0	0	0
DF	(West Germany)	Thomas Knauer	1984–1985	0	**0**	0	0	0	0	0	0	0	0	0	0	0	0	0	**0**	0	0	0	0	0	0	0	0	0	0
DF	(West Germany)	Ingo Pickenäcker	1984–1985	24	**0**	22	0	0	0	0	0	0	0	0	0	0	0	22	**0**	2	0	0	0	0	0	0	0	0	0
GK	(West Germany)	Markus Croonen	1984–1986	5	**0**	4	0	0	0	0	0	0	0	0	0	0	0	4	**0**	1	0	0	0	0	0	0	0	0	0
MF	(West Germany)	Toni Schreier	1984–1986	24	**2**	21	1	0	0	0	0	0	0	0	0	0	0	21	**1**	3	1	0	0	0	0	0	0	0	0
FW	(West Germany)	Klaus Fischer	1984–1988	94	**29**	84	27	0	0	0	0	0	0	0	0	0	0	84	**27**	10	2	0	0	0	0	0	0	0	0
MF	(West Germany)	Peter Knäbel	1984–1988	43	**5**	38	5	0	0	0	0	0	0	0	0	0	0	38	**5**	5	0	0	0	0	0	0	0	0	0
DF	(West Germany)	Martin Kree	1984–1989	181	**29**	164	28	0	0	0	0	0	0	0	0	0	0	164	**28**	17	1	0	0	0	0	0	0	0	0
GK	(West Germany)	Dirk Drescher	1985	1	**0**	1	0	0	0	0	0	0	0	0	0	0	0	1	**0**	0	0	0	0	0	0	0	0	0	0
DF	(West Germany)	Frank Saborowski	1985	5	**0**	5	0	0	0	0	0	0	0	0	0	0	0	5	**0**	0	0	0	0	0	0	0	0	0	0
GK	(West Germany)	Wolfgang Kleff	1985–1986	21	**0**	20	0	0	0	0	0	0	0	0	0	0	0	20	**0**	1	0	0	0	0	0	0	0	0	0
MF	(West Germany)	Volker Knappheide	1985–1987	8	**1**	7	1	0	0	0	0	0	0	0	0	0	0	7	**1**	1	0	0	0	0	0	0	0	0	0
DF	(West Germany)	Jürgen Wielert	1985–1987	21	**1**	18	1	0	0	0	0	0	0	0	0	0	0	18	**1**	3	0	0	0	0	0	0	0	0	0
MF	(Germany)	Uwe Wegmann	1985–1987; 1989–1995	260	**80**	214	52	30	22	0	0	0	0	0	0	0	0	244	**74**	14	6	0	0	0	0	2	0	0	0
FW	(Germany)	Uwe Leifeld	1985–1991	168	**54**	149	46	0	0	0	0	0	0	0	0	0	0	149	**46**	17	7	0	0	0	0	2	1	0	0
MF	(Germany)	Thomas Kempe	1985–1994	253	**17**	234	16	0	0	0	0	0	0	0	0	0	0	234	**16**	17	1	0	0	0	0	2	0	0	0
FW	(Denmark)	Ole Møller Nielsen	1986	2	**0**	2	0	0	0	0	0	0	0	0	0	0	0	2	**0**	0	0	0	0	0	0	0	0	0	0
FW	(West Germany)	Rudolf Decker	1986–1987	0	**0**	0	0	0	0	0	0	0	0	0	0	0	0	0	**0**	0	0	0	0	0	0	0	0	0	0
FW	(West Germany)	Franz Schick	1986–1987	5	**0**	4	0	0	0	0	0	0	0	0	0	0	0	4	**0**	1	0	0	0	0	0	0	0	0	0
FW	(West Germany)	Andreas Lübke	1986–1988	8	**1**	8	1	0	0	0	0	0	0	0	0	0	0	8	**1**	0	0	0	0	0	0	0	0	0	0
MF	(Germany)	Thorsten Legat	1986–1991	118	**11**	107	9	0	0	0	0	0	0	0	0	0	0	107	**9**	9	1	0	0	0	0	2	1	0	0
MF	(Germany)	Josef Nehl	1986–1991	158	**23**	145	21	0	0	0	0	0	0	0	0	0	0	145	**21**	11	2	0	0	0	0	2	0	0	0
DF	(Netherlands)	Rob Reekers	1986–1995	260	**8**	219	7	25	1	0	0	0	0	0	0	0	0	244	**8**	14	0	0	0	0	0	2	0	0	0
GK	(Germany)	Andreas Wessels	1986–1995	169	**0**	121	0	37	0	0	0	0	0	0	0	0	0	158	**0**	9	0	0	0	0	0	2	0	0	0
MF	(Germany)	Frank Heinemann	1986–1996	231	**16**	195	14	21	1	0	0	0	0	0	0	0	0	216	**15**	14	1	0	0	0	0	1	0	0	0
FW	(Greece)	Minas Hantzidis	1987	4	**2**	3	1	0	0	0	0	0	0	0	0	0	0	3	**1**	1	1	0	0	0	0	0	0	0	0
MF	(West Germany)	Detlef Mikolajczak	1987–1988	10	**0**	8	0	0	0	0	0	0	0	0	0	0	0	8	**0**	2	0	0	0	0	0	0	0	0	0
FW	(Socialist Federal Republic of Yugoslavia)	Kreso Kovacec	1987–1988; 1989–1990	0	**0**	0	0	0	0	0	0	0	0	0	0	0	0	0	**0**	0	0	0	0	0	0	0	0	0	0
MF	(Poland)	Andrzej Iwan	1987–1989	36	**4**	30	2	0	0	0	0	0	0	0	0	0	0	30	**2**	6	2	0	0	0	0	0	0	0	0
DF	(West Germany)	Peter Jackisch	1987–1989	20	**0**	20	0	0	0	0	0	0	0	0	0	0	0	20	**0**	0	0	0	0	0	0	0	0	0	0
MF	(West Germany)	Dirk Riechmann	1987–1989	7	**2**	6	2	0	0	0	0	0	0	0	0	0	0	6	**2**	1	0	0	0	0	0	0	0	0	0
FW	(Germany)	Thomas Epp	1987–1989; 1990–1992	76	**8**	68	7	0	0	0	0	0	0	0	0	0	0	68	**7**	8	1	0	0	0	0	0	0	0	0
MF	(Germany)	Michael Hubner	1987–1991; 1993–1995	69	**5**	45	3	19	1	0	0	0	0	0	0	0	0	64	**4**	3	1	0	0	0	0	2	0	0	0
MF	(Germany)	Olaf Dreßel	1987–1994	102	**3**	82	3	13	0	0	0	0	0	0	0	0	0	95	**3**	5	0	0	0	0	0	2	0	0	0
MF	(Germany)	Michael Rzehaczek	1987–1994	151	**16**	139	16	0	0	0	0	0	0	0	0	0	0	139	**16**	10	0	0	0	0	0	2	0	0	0
FW	(West Germany)	Thorsten Bolzek	1988–1989	24	**3**	22	2	0	0	0	0	0	0	0	0	0	0	22	**2**	2	1	0	0	0	0	0	0	0	0
DF	(West Germany)	Jürgen Gredig	1988–1989	4	**0**	3	0	0	0	0	0	0	0	0	0	0	0	3	**0**	1	0	0	0	0	0	0	0	0	0
DF	(West Germany)	Oliver Westerbeek	1988–1989	16	**0**	15	0	0	0	0	0	0	0	0	0	0	0	15	**0**	1	0	0	0	0	0	0	0	0	0
DF	(West Germany)	Dirk Sadowicz	1988–1990	2	**0**	2	0	0	0	0	0	0	0	0	0	0	0	2	**0**	0	0	0	0	0	0	0	0	0	0
MF	(West Germany)	Martin Slawinski	1988–1990	0	**0**	0	0	0	0	0	0	0	0	0	0	0	0	0	**0**	0	0	0	0	0	0	0	0	0	0
DF	(Netherlands)	Gerrit Plomp	1989	11	**0**	10	0	0	0	0	0	0	0	0	0	0	0	10	**0**	1	0	0	0	0	0	0	0	0	0
MF	(Hungary)	László Farkasházy	1989–1990	10	**0**	8	0	0	0	0	0	0	0	0	0	0	0	8	**0**	2	0	0	0	0	0	0	0	0	0
FW	(West Germany)	Andreas Jeschke	1989–1990	0	**0**	0	0	0	0	0	0	0	0	0	0	0	0	0	**0**	0	0	0	0	0	0	0	0	0	0
MF	(West Germany)	Joachim Kusch	1989–1990	0	**0**	0	0	0	0	0	0	0	0	0	0	0	0	0	**0**	0	0	0	0	0	0	0	0	0	0
MF	(West Germany)	Meinolf Mehls	1989–1990	1	**0**	1	0	0	0	0	0	0	0	0	0	0	0	1	**0**	0	0	0	0	0	0	0	0	0	0
FW	(Germany)	Stefan Kohn	1989–1991	58	**19**	55	17	0	0	0	0	0	0	0	0	0	0	55	**17**	3	2	0	0	0	0	0	0	0	0
FW	(Germany)	Elard Ostermann	1989–1991	31	**1**	27	1	0	0	0	0	0	0	0	0	0	0	27	**1**	3	0	0	0	0	0	1	0	0	0
DF	(Germany)	Andreas Ridder	1989–1991	30	**1**	26	1	0	0	0	0	0	0	0	0	0	0	26	**1**	2	0	0	0	0	0	2	0	0	0
DF	(Germany)	Peter Zanter	1989–1992	31	**0**	29	0	0	0	0	0	0	0	0	0	0	0	29	**0**	2	0	0	0	0	0	0	0	0	0
MF	(Germany)	Dirk Eitzert	1989–1994	47	**0**	34	0	13	0	0	0	0	0	0	0	0	0	47	**0**	0	0	0	0	0	0	0	0	0	0
GK	(Germany)	Carsten Eisenmenger	1990–1991	0	**0**	0	0	0	0	0	0	0	0	0	0	0	0	0	**0**	0	0	0	0	0	0	0	0	0	0
FW	(Poland)	Maciej Śliwowski	1990–1991	0	**0**	0	0	0	0	0	0	0	0	0	0	0	0	0	**0**	0	0	0	0	0	0	0	0	0	0
FW	(Germany)	Adam Woitynek	1990–1991	0	**0**	0	0	0	0	0	0	0	0	0	0	0	0	0	**0**	0	0	0	0	0	0	0	0	0	0
DF	(France)	Patrick Guillou	1990–1993	9	**0**	9	0	0	0	0	0	0	0	0	0	0	0	9	**0**	0	0	0	0	0	0	0	0	0	0
FW	(Germany)	Rocco Milde	1990–1993	55	**3**	52	3	2	0	0	0	0	0	0	0	0	0	54	**3**	1	0	0	0	0	0	0	0	0	0
DF	(Germany)	Christian Herrmann	1990–1997	155	**6**	101	4	49	2	0	0	0	0	0	0	0	0	150	**6**	5	0	0	0	0	0	0	0	0	0
MF	(Germany)	Peter Peschel	1990–2001	269	**60**	154	25	94	28	0	0	0	0	0	0	0	0	248	**53**	15	6	1	0	5	1	0	0	0	0
MF	(Germany)	Dirk Kontny	1991	2	**0**	1	0	0	0	0	0	0	0	0	0	0	0	1	**0**	1	0	0	0	0	0	0	0	0	0
FW	(Germany)	Michael Klauß	1991; 1992–1993	15	**1**	13	1	0	0	0	0	0	0	0	0	0	0	13	**1**	2	0	0	0	0	0	0	0	0	0
FW	(Czechoslovakia)	Ivo Knoflíček	1991–1992	10	**1**	10	1	0	0	0	0	0	0	0	0	0	0	10	**1**	0	0	0	0	0	0	0	0	0	0
DF	(Spain)	Antonio Manuel Rodríguez Cabo (Oti)	1991–1992	0	**0**	0	0	0	0	0	0	0	0	0	0	0	0	0	**0**	0	0	0	0	0	0	0	0	0	0
FW	(Germany)	Frank Türr	1991–1992	25	**2**	22	2	0	0	0	0	0	0	0	0	0	0	22	**2**	3	0	0	0	0	0	0	0	0	0
MF	(Germany)	Thorsten Schmugge	1991–1992; 1996	8	**0**	0	0	8	0	0	0	0	0	0	0	0	0	8	**0**	0	0	0	0	0	0	0	0	0	0
MF	(Germany)	Heiko Bonan	1991–1993	72	**7**	69	6	0	0	0	0	0	0	0	0	0	0	69	**6**	3	1	0	0	0	0	0	0	0	0
MF	(Germany)	Dirk Helmig	1991–1994	61	**6**	31	5	28	1	0	0	0	0	0	0	0	0	59	**6**	2	0	0	0	0	0	0	0	0	0
DF	(Germany)	Jörg Schwanke	1991–1995	86	**3**	59	2	25	0	0	0	0	0	0	0	0	0	84	**2**	2	1	0	0	0	0	0	0	0	0
FW	(Ukraine)	Volodymyr Lyutyi	1992–1993	3	**0**	3	0	0	0	0	0	0	0	0	0	0	0	3	**0**	0	0	0	0	0	0	0	0	0	0
FW	(Greece)	Dimitrios Moutas	1992–1993	17	**4**	15	3	0	0	0	0	0	0	0	0	0	0	15	**3**	2	1	0	0	0	0	0	0	0	0
MF	(Germany)	Christian Zetzmann	1992–1993	0	**0**	0	0	0	0	0	0	0	0	0	0	0	0	0	**0**	0	0	0	0	0	0	0	0	0	0
FW	(South Korea)	Chu-sŏng Kim	1992–1994	35	**4**	13	0	21	4	0	0	0	0	0	0	0	0	34	**4**	1	0	0	0	0	0	0	0	0	0
DF	(Germany)	Sven Christians	1992–1995	76	**5**	40	3	32	2	0	0	0	0	0	0	0	0	72	**5**	4	0	0	0	0	0	0	0	0	0
FW	(Germany)	Holger Aden	1992–1996	45	**20**	22	13	20	7	0	0	0	0	0	0	0	0	42	**20**	3	0	0	0	0	0	0	0	0	0
MF	(Germany)	Dariusz Wosz	1992–1998; 2001–2007	377	**45**	239	28	107	13	0	0	0	0	0	0	0	0	346	**41**	20	3	3	0	8	1	0	0	0	0
FW	(Germany)	Robert Mawick	1993–1994	1	**0**	0	0	1	0	0	0	0	0	0	0	0	0	1	**0**	0	0	0	0	0	0	0	0	0	0
MF	(Portugal)	Paulo da Palma	1993–1995	26	**1**	10	1	14	0	0	0	0	0	0	0	0	0	24	**1**	2	0	0	0	0	0	0	0	0	0
DF	(Germany)	Uwe Stöver	1993–1995	65	**4**	25	0	37	4	0	0	0	0	0	0	0	0	62	**4**	3	0	0	0	0	0	0	0	0	0
FW	(Iceland)	Þórður Guðjónsson	1993–1997; 2002–2004	124	**15**	73	7	44	6	0	0	0	0	0	0	0	0	117	**13**	7	2	0	0	0	0	0	0	0	0
MF	(Germany)	Kai Michalke	1993–1999	138	**22**	87	11	44	10	0	0	0	0	0	0	0	0	131	**21**	5	1	0	0	2	0	0	0	0	0
MF	(Germany)	Michael Frontzeck	1994–1995	29	**2**	28	2	0	0	0	0	0	0	0	0	0	0	28	**2**	1	0	0	0	0	0	0	0	0	0
DF	(Germany)	Uwe Schneider	1994–1995	13	**0**	11	0	0	0	0	0	0	0	0	0	0	0	11	**0**	2	0	0	0	0	0	0	0	0	0
MF	(Germany)	Markus von Ahlen	1994–1995	31	**3**	14	1	15	2	0	0	0	0	0	0	0	0	29	**3**	2	0	0	0	0	0	0	0	0	0
FW	(United States)	Eric Wynalda	1994–1995	31	**2**	22	0	7	2	0	0	0	0	0	0	0	0	29	**2**	2	0	0	0	0	0	0	0	0	0
MF	(Germany)	Robert Matiebel	1994–1996	4	**0**	4	0	0	0	0	0	0	0	0	0	0	0	4	**0**	0	0	0	0	0	0	0	0	0	0
MF	(Germany)	Andreas Wieczorek	1994–1996	4	**0**	1	0	3	0	0	0	0	0	0	0	0	0	4	**0**	0	0	0	0	0	0	0	0	0	0
DF	(Germany)	Max Eberl	1994–1997	44	**0**	27	0	15	0	0	0	0	0	0	0	0	0	42	**0**	2	0	0	0	0	0	0	0	0	0
FW	(Germany)	Roland Wohlfarth	1994–1997	41	**8**	16	0	24	7	0	0	0	0	0	0	0	0	40	**7**	1	1	0	0	0	0	0	0	0	0
FW	(Poland)	Henryk Bałuszyński	1994–1998; 1999–2001	110	**20**	56	6	41	11	0	0	0	0	0	0	0	0	97	**17**	9	2	0	0	4	1	0	0	0	0
DF	(Poland)	Tomasz Wałdoch	1994–1999	147	**9**	108	6	25	2	0	0	0	0	0	0	0	0	133	**8**	10	0	0	0	4	1	0	0	0	0
FW	(Germany)	Yves Gaugler	1995–1996	12	**1**	0	0	11	1	0	0	0	0	0	0	0	0	11	**1**	1	0	0	0	0	0	0	0	0	0
MF	(Poland)	Andrzej Rudy	1995–1996	14	**1**	0	0	14	1	0	0	0	0	0	0	0	0	14	**1**	0	0	0	0	0	0	0	0	0	0
DF	(Germany)	Mathias Jack	1995–1997	59	**2**	29	1	27	1	0	0	0	0	0	0	0	0	56	**2**	3	0	0	0	0	0	0	0	0	0
MF	(Croatia)	Filip Tapalović	1995–1997; 2002–2005	73	**2**	64	2	5	0	0	0	0	0	0	0	0	0	69	**2**	3	0	1	0	0	0	0	0	0	0
GK	(Germany)	Uwe Gospodarek	1995–1998	95	**0**	49	0	33	0	0	0	0	0	0	0	0	0	82	**0**	7	0	1	0	5	0	0	0	0	0
MF	(Germany)	Peter Közle	1995–1998	83	**19**	40	6	33	11	0	0	0	0	0	0	0	0	73	**17**	6	2	1	0	3	0	0	0	0	0
DF	(Germany)	Torsten Kracht	1995–1999	131	**10**	83	3	33	5	0	0	0	0	0	0	0	0	116	**8**	8	2	1	0	6	0	0	0	0	0
GK	(Germany)	Thomas Ernst	1995–2000	77	**0**	52	0	19	0	0	0	0	0	0	0	0	0	71	**0**	5	0	0	0	1	0	0	0	0	0
GK	(Germany)	Stefan Wächter	1995–2000	0	**0**	0	0	0	0	0	0	0	0	0	0	0	0	0	**0**	0	0	0	0	0	0	0	0	0	0
MF	(Germany)	Thomas Stickroth	1995–2002	134	**9**	52	4	68	3	0	0	0	0	0	0	0	0	120	**7**	11	1	1	0	2	1	0	0	0	0
MF	(Germany)	Thomas Reis	1995–2003	198	**19**	112	12	64	4	0	0	0	0	0	0	0	0	176	**16**	16	2	1	0	5	1	0	0	0	0
FW	(South Africa)	Delron Buckley	1995–2004	194	**24**	110	10	67	10	0	0	0	0	0	0	0	0	177	**20**	16	4	1	0	0	0	0	0	0	0
MF	(Turkey)	Eyyüp Hasan Uğur	1996	0	**0**	0	0	0	0	0	0	0	0	0	0	0	0	0	**0**	0	0	0	0	0	0	0	0	0	0
DF	(Bulgaria)	Engibar Engibarov	1996–1997	0	**0**	0	0	0	0	0	0	0	0	0	0	0	0	0	**0**	0	0	0	0	0	0	0	0	0	0
FW	(Bulgaria)	Georgi Donkov	1996–1998	62	**15**	53	13	0	0	0	0	0	0	0	0	0	0	53	**13**	4	0	1	0	4	2	0	0	0	0
DF	(Germany)	Karsten Hutwelker	1996–1998	33	**4**	25	4	0	0	0	0	0	0	0	0	0	0	25	**4**	5	0	1	0	2	0	0	0	0	0
FW	(Germany)	Danny Winkler	1996–1998	8	**1**	7	0	0	0	0	0	0	0	0	0	0	0	7	**0**	1	1	0	0	0	0	0	0	0	0
MF	(Croatia)	Zoran Mamić	1996–1998; 2000–2001	77	**5**	66	4	0	0	0	0	0	0	0	0	0	0	66	**4**	8	0	0	0	3	1	0	0	0	0
FW	(Turkey)	Nesat Gülünoğlu	1996–1999	42	**4**	37	4	0	0	0	0	0	0	0	0	0	0	37	**4**	3	0	1	0	1	0	0	0	0	0
MF	(Germany)	Olaf Schreiber	1996–2001	91	**2**	68	2	10	0	0	0	0	0	0	0	0	0	78	**2**	7	0	1	0	5	0	0	0	0	0
DF	(Germany)	Frank Fahrenhorst	1996–2004	150	**18**	106	13	30	3	0	0	0	0	0	0	0	0	136	**16**	12	2	1	0	1	0	0	0	0	0
MF	(Germany)	Mirko Reichel	1997–1998	14	**0**	9	0	0	0	0	0	0	0	0	0	0	0	9	**0**	1	0	0	0	4	0	0	0	0	0
FW	(Russia)	Sergei Yuran	1997–1998	28	**7**	23	4	0	0	0	0	0	0	0	0	0	0	23	**4**	1	0	0	0	4	3	0	0	0	0
MF	(Germany)	Norbert Hofmann	1997–1999	66	**4**	58	3	0	0	0	0	0	0	0	0	0	0	58	**3**	3	0	1	0	4	1	0	0	0	0
MF	(Turkey)	Yıldıray Baştürk	1997–2001	115	**20**	74	6	30	7	0	0	0	0	0	0	0	0	104	**13**	10	7	0	0	1	0	0	0	0	0
MF	(Germany)	Mirko Dickhaut	1997–2002	128	**6**	54	3	57	2	0	0	0	0	0	0	0	0	111	**5**	10	0	1	0	6	1	0	0	0	0
DF	(Germany)	Axel Sundermann	1997–2002	106	**2**	66	2	25	0	0	0	0	0	0	0	0	0	91	**2**	10	0	0	0	5	0	0	0	0	0
MF	(Slovenia)	Emir Dzafič	1998–1999	7	**1**	6	1	0	0	0	0	0	0	0	0	0	0	6	**1**	1	0	0	0	0	0	0	0	0	0
MF	(Germany)	Maurizio Gaudino	1998–1999	21	**2**	20	2	0	0	0	0	0	0	0	0	0	0	20	**2**	1	0	0	0	0	0	0	0	0	0
MF	(Romania)	Viorel Ion	1998–1999	12	**1**	12	1	0	0	0	0	0	0	0	0	0	0	12	**1**	0	0	0	0	0	0	0	0	0	0
GK	(Germany)	Maik Kischko	1998–1999	3	**0**	2	0	0	0	0	0	0	0	0	0	0	0	2	**0**	1	0	0	0	0	0	0	0	0	0
DF	(Croatia)	Alen Petrović	1998–1999	9	**1**	7	0	0	0	0	0	0	0	0	0	0	0	7	**0**	2	1	0	0	0	0	0	0	0	0
MF	(Germany)	Jan Holland	1998–2000	0	**0**	0	0	0	0	0	0	0	0	0	0	0	0	0	**0**	0	0	0	0	0	0	0	0	0	0
FW	(Poland)	Jacek Ratajczak	1998–2000	0	**0**	0	0	0	0	0	0	0	0	0	0	0	0	0	**0**	0	0	0	0	0	0	0	0	0	0
FW	(Croatia)	Zdravko Drinčić	1998–2001	40	**5**	32	4	5	0	0	0	0	0	0	0	0	0	37	**4**	3	1	0	0	0	0	0	0	0	0
DF	(Croatia)	Samir Toplak	1998–2002	69	**3**	33	1	32	2	0	0	0	0	0	0	0	0	65	**3**	4	0	0	0	0	0	0	0	0	0
MF	(Germany)	Björn Joppe	1998–2003	11	**0**	3	0	8	0	0	0	0	0	0	0	0	0	11	**0**	0	0	0	0	0	0	0	0	0	0
MF	(Germany)	Sebastian Schindzielorz	1998–2003	147	**11**	82	7	54	3	0	0	0	0	0	0	0	0	136	**10**	11	1	0	0	0	0	0	0	0	0
DF	(Germany)	Michael Bemben	1998–2005	137	**3**	65	0	57	3	0	0	0	0	0	0	0	0	122	**3**	14	0	1	0	0	0	0	0	0	0
MF	(Iran)	Mehdi Mahdavikia	1999	12	**3**	12	3	0	0	0	0	0	0	0	0	0	0	12	**3**	0	0	0	0	0	0	0	0	0	0
MF	(Germany)	Andreas Zeyer	1999	11	**3**	11	3	0	0	0	0	0	0	0	0	0	0	11	**3**	0	0	0	0	0	0	0	0	0	0
DF	(Germany)	Sven Boy	1999–2000	8	**0**	0	0	7	0	0	0	0	0	0	0	0	0	7	**0**	1	0	0	0	0	0	0	0	0	0
FW	(Germany)	Jan Majewski	1999–2000	3	**0**	1	0	1	0	0	0	0	0	0	0	0	0	2	**0**	1	0	0	0	0	0	0	0	0	0
FW	(Germany)	René Müller	1999–2000	13	**1**	1	0	9	1	0	0	0	0	0	0	0	0	10	**1**	3	0	0	0	0	0	0	0	0	0
GK	(Germany)	Klaus Schlapka	1999–2000	0	**0**	0	0	0	0	0	0	0	0	0	0	0	0	0	**0**	0	0	0	0	0	0	0	0	0	0
FW	(Germany)	Achim Weber	1999–2000	45	**25**	9	1	31	19	0	0	0	0	0	0	0	0	40	**20**	5	5	0	0	0	0	0	0	0	0
MF	(Germany)	Matthias Lust	1999–2001	30	**2**	3	0	23	2	0	0	0	0	0	0	0	0	26	**2**	4	0	0	0	0	0	0	0	0	0
FW	(Croatia)	Marijo Marić	1999–2001	50	**13**	27	8	20	4	0	0	0	0	0	0	0	0	47	**12**	3	1	0	0	0	0	0	0	0	0
DF	(Germany)	Mike Rietpietsch	1999–2001	17	**2**	5	0	8	0	0	0	0	0	0	0	0	0	13	**0**	4	2	0	0	0	0	0	0	0	0
DF	(Germany)	Hilko Ristau	1999–2002	62	**6**	13	0	42	6	0	0	0	0	0	0	0	0	55	**6**	7	0	0	0	0	0	0	0	0	0
MF	(Germany)	Paul Freier	1999–2004; 2008–2014	289	**28**	137	12	129	12	0	0	0	0	0	0	0	0	266	**24**	20	4	1	0	0	0	2	0	0	0
GK	(Netherlands)	Rein van Duijnhoven	1999–2006	195	**0**	119	0	61	0	0	0	0	0	0	0	0	0	180	**0**	11	0	2	0	2	0	0	0	0	0
FW	(Croatia)	Ante Čović	2000–2001	5	**0**	5	0	0	0	0	0	0	0	0	0	0	0	5	**0**	0	0	0	0	0	0	0	0	0	0
DF	(Croatia)	Damir Milinović	2000–2001	22	**0**	20	0	0	0	0	0	0	0	0	0	0	0	20	**0**	2	0	0	0	0	0	0	0	0	0
DF	(Germany)	Rouven Schröder	2000–2002	24	**3**	8	0	16	3	0	0	0	0	0	0	0	0	24	**3**	0	0	0	0	0	0	0	0	0	0
FW	(Germany)	Sascha Siebert	2000–2002	1	**0**	1	0	0	0	0	0	0	0	0	0	0	0	1	**0**	0	0	0	0	0	0	0	0	0	0
MF	(Russia)	Sergei Mandreko	2000–2003	60	**0**	30	0	26	0	0	0	0	0	0	0	0	0	56	**0**	4	0	0	0	0	0	0	0	0	0
GK	(Germany)	Christian Vander	2000–2005	29	**0**	19	0	5	0	0	0	0	0	0	0	0	0	24	**0**	5	0	0	0	0	0	0	0	0	0
DF	(Germany)	Martin Meichelbeck	2000–2008	140	**10**	89	4	37	5	0	0	0	0	0	0	0	0	126	**9**	13	1	0	0	1	0	0	0	0	0
MF	(Germany)	Malek Barudi	2001–2002	0	**0**	0	0	0	0	0	0	0	0	0	0	0	0	0	**0**	0	0	0	0	0	0	0	0	0	0
FW	(Germany)	Mike Busch	2001–2002	2	**0**	0	0	2	0	0	0	0	0	0	0	0	0	2	**0**	0	0	0	0	0	0	0	0	0	0
MF	(Germany)	Markus Ehrhard	2001–2002	4	**0**	0	0	4	0	0	0	0	0	0	0	0	0	4	**0**	0	0	0	0	0	0	0	0	0	0
FW	(Denmark)	Peter Graulund	2001–2002	22	**5**	8	2	13	3	0	0	0	0	0	0	0	0	21	**5**	1	0	0	0	0	0	0	0	0	0
GK	(Germany)	Sebastian Selke	2001–2002	0	**0**	0	0	0	0	0	0	0	0	0	0	0	0	0	**0**	0	0	0	0	0	0	0	0	0	0
FW	(Germany)	Dino Toppmöller	2001–2002	13	**1**	0	0	12	1	0	0	0	0	0	0	0	0	12	**1**	1	0	0	0	0	0	0	0	0	0
MF	(Austria)	Dietmar Berchtold	2001–2003	10	**0**	0	0	9	0	0	0	0	0	0	0	0	0	9	**0**	1	0	0	0	0	0	0	0	0	0
FW	(Spain)	Thomas Christiansen	2001–2003	79	**41**	46	22	30	17	0	0	0	0	0	0	0	0	76	**39**	3	2	0	0	0	0	0	0	0	0
FW	(Iran)	Vahid Hashemian	2001–2004; 2008–2010	137	**40**	107	29	21	8	0	0	0	0	0	0	0	0	128	**37**	8	2	1	1	0	0	0	0	0	0
DF	(Denmark)	Søren Colding	2001–2006	161	**4**	114	1	35	2	0	0	0	0	0	0	0	0	149	**3**	9	1	1	0	2	0	0	0	0	0
MF	(Germany)	Danny Woidtke	2002–2003	0	**0**	0	0	0	0	0	0	0	0	0	0	0	0	0	**0**	0	0	0	0	0	0	0	0	0	0
MF	(Spain)	Cristian Fiél	2002–2004	7	**0**	6	0	0	0	0	0	0	0	0	0	0	0	6	**0**	1	0	0	0	0	0	0	0	0	0
MF	(Germany)	Sascha Höhle	2002–2004	0	**0**	0	0	0	0	0	0	0	0	0	0	0	0	0	**0**	0	0	0	0	0	0	0	0	0	0
GK	(Croatia)	Toni Tapalović	2002–2004	0	**0**	0	0	0	0	0	0	0	0	0	0	0	0	0	**0**	0	0	0	0	0	0	0	0	0	0
DF	(Netherlands)	Anton Vriesde	2002–2004	29	**0**	27	0	0	0	0	0	0	0	0	0	0	0	27	**0**	2	0	0	0	0	0	0	0	0	0
DF	(Cameroon)	Raymond Kalla	2002–2005	88	**6**	77	6	0	0	0	0	0	0	0	0	0	0	77	**6**	7	0	2	0	2	0	0	0	0	0
MF	(Italy)	Luciano Velardi	2002–2005	2	**0**	2	0	0	0	0	0	0	0	0	0	0	0	2	**0**	0	0	0	0	0	0	0	0	0	0
MF	(Germany)	David Zajas	2003; 2006–2009	1	**0**	1	0	0	0	0	0	0	0	0	0	0	0	1	**0**	0	0	0	0	0	0	0	0	0	0
FW	(Germany)	Marcus Fischer	2003–2004	2	**0**	2	0	0	0	0	0	0	0	0	0	0	0	2	**0**	0	0	0	0	0	0	0	0	0	0
GK	(Germany)	Bastian Görrissen	2003–2004	0	**0**	0	0	0	0	0	0	0	0	0	0	0	0	0	**0**	0	0	0	0	0	0	0	0	0	0
MF	(Iceland)	Bjarni Guðjónsson	2003–2004	6	**1**	4	1	0	0	0	0	0	0	0	0	0	0	4	**1**	1	0	1	0	0	0	0	0	0	0
MF	(Nigeria)	Sunday Oliseh	2003–2004	34	**1**	32	1	0	0	0	0	0	0	0	0	0	0	32	**1**	1	0	1	0	0	0	0	0	0	0
FW	(Denmark)	Peter Madsen	2003–2005	54	**20**	51	18	0	0	0	0	0	0	0	0	0	0	51	**18**	2	2	1	0	0	0	0	0	0	0
MF	(Serbia)	Miroslav Stević	2003–2005	21	**1**	21	1	0	0	0	0	0	0	0	0	0	0	21	**1**	0	0	0	0	0	0	0	0	0	0
FW	(Senegal)	Mamadou Diabang	2003–2006	50	**9**	35	7	9	1	0	0	0	0	0	0	0	0	44	**8**	3	1	2	0	1	0	0	0	0	0
FW	(Brazil)	Eduardo Gonçalves de Oliveira (Edu)	2003–2006	68	**17**	30	4	33	12	0	0	0	0	0	0	0	0	63	**16**	4	1	0	0	1	0	0	0	0	0
DF	(Germany)	Alexander Thamm	2003–2006	3	**0**	3	0	0	0	0	0	0	0	0	0	0	0	3	**0**	0	0	0	0	0	0	0	0	0	0
MF	(Germany)	Ersan Tekkan	2003–2007	0	**0**	0	0	0	0	0	0	0	0	0	0	0	0	0	**0**	0	0	0	0	0	0	0	0	0	0
MF	(Poland)	Tomasz Zdebel	2003–2008	175	**8**	132	6	30	2	0	0	0	0	0	0	0	0	162	**8**	9	0	2	0	2	0	0	0	0	0
DF	(Germany)	Philipp Bönig	2003–2012	184	**0**	140	0	30	0	0	0	0	0	0	0	0	0	170	**0**	10	0	2	0	2	0	0	0	0	0
DF	(Turkey)	Fatih Akyel	2004–2005	1	**0**	1	0	0	0	0	0	0	0	0	0	0	0	1	**0**	0	0	0	0	0	0	0	0	0	0
DF	(Slovenia)	Aleksander Knavs	2004–2005	31	**1**	26	1	0	0	0	0	0	0	0	0	0	0	26	**1**	2	0	1	0	2	0	0	0	0	0
FW	(Czech Republic)	Vratislav Lokvenc	2004–2005	36	**11**	32	10	0	0	0	0	0	0	0	0	0	0	32	**10**	2	1	0	0	2	0	0	0	0	0
FW	(Italy)	Gaetano Manno	2004–2005	2	**0**	2	0	0	0	0	0	0	0	0	0	0	0	2	**0**	0	0	0	0	0	0	0	0	0	0
DF	(Germany)	Marvin Matip	2004–2005	1	**0**	1	0	0	0	0	0	0	0	0	0	0	0	1	**0**	0	0	0	0	0	0	0	0	0	0
MF	(Iran)	Moharram Navidkia	2004–2005	12	**0**	0	0	10	0	0	0	0	0	0	0	0	0	10	**0**	2	0	0	0	0	0	0	0	0	0
MF	(Germany)	Christoph Preuß	2004–2005	34	**2**	30	2	0	0	0	0	0	0	0	0	0	0	30	**2**	1	0	1	0	2	0	0	0	0	0
GK	(Turkey)	Polat Keser	2004–2005; 2006–2007	0	**0**	0	0	0	0	0	0	0	0	0	0	0	0	0	**0**	0	0	0	0	0	0	0	0	0	0
MF	(Bosnia and Herzegovina)	Zvjezdan Misimović	2004–2007	101	**24**	61	10	31	11	0	0	0	0	0	0	0	0	92	**21**	6	3	1	0	2	0	0	0	0	0
MF	(Czech Republic)	Filip Trojan	2004–2007	75	**1**	45	0	22	1	0	0	0	0	0	0	0	0	67	**1**	6	0	1	0	1	0	0	0	0	0
FW	(Denmark)	Tommy Bechmann	2004–2008	91	**15**	58	9	24	4	0	0	0	0	0	0	0	0	82	**13**	7	2	1	0	1	0	0	0	0	0
MF	(Germany)	Dennis Grote	2004–2010	91	**8**	69	6	16	1	0	0	0	0	0	0	0	0	85	**7**	6	1	0	0	0	0	0	0	0	0
DF	(Germany)	Marcel Maltritz	2004–2014	328	**20**	146	6	156	11	0	0	0	0	0	0	0	0	302	**17**	21	2	1	0	2	1	2	0	0	0
FW	(Romania)	Ionel Gane	2005	1	**0**	0	0	1	0	0	0	0	0	0	0	0	0	1	**0**	0	0	0	0	0	0	0	0	0	0
DF	(Germany)	Thorsten Barg	2005–2006	0	**0**	0	0	0	0	0	0	0	0	0	0	0	0	0	**0**	0	0	0	0	0	0	0	0	0	0
DF	(Brazil)	Leonardo Bruno dos Santos Silva (China)	2005–2006	18	**0**	0	0	16	0	0	0	0	0	0	0	0	0	16	**0**	2	0	0	0	0	0	0	0	0	0
MF	(Germany)	Claus Costa	2005–2006	0	**0**	0	0	0	0	0	0	0	0	0	0	0	0	0	**0**	0	0	0	0	0	0	0	0	0	0
FW	(Turkey)	Haluk Türkeri	2005–2006	1	**0**	0	0	1	0	0	0	0	0	0	0	0	0	1	**0**	0	0	0	0	0	0	0	0	0	0
DF	(Germany)	David Czyszczon	2005–2007	5	**1**	0	0	5	1	0	0	0	0	0	0	0	0	5	**1**	0	0	0	0	0	0	0	0	0	0
MF	(Switzerland)	David Pallas	2005–2007	33	**0**	8	0	24	0	0	0	0	0	0	0	0	0	32	**0**	1	0	0	0	0	0	0	0	0	0
FW	(Germany)	Thomas Rathgeber	2005–2007	8	**0**	1	0	6	0	0	0	0	0	0	0	0	0	7	**0**	1	0	0	0	0	0	0	0	0	0
GK	(Denmark)	Peter Skov-Jensen	2005–2007	30	**0**	14	0	15	0	0	0	0	0	0	0	0	0	29	**0**	1	0	0	0	0	0	0	0	0	0
FW	(Belgium)	Joris van Hout	2005–2007	41	**6**	14	0	25	6	0	0	0	0	0	0	0	0	39	**6**	2	0	0	0	0	0	0	0	0	0
DF	(Germany)	Heiko Butscher	2005–2007; 2013–2015	65	**7**	20	1	40	4	0	0	0	0	0	0	0	0	60	**5**	5	2	0	0	0	0	0	0	0	0
DF	(Czech Republic)	Pavel Drsek	2005–2008	69	**5**	39	1	24	2	0	0	0	0	0	0	0	0	63	**3**	6	2	0	0	0	0	0	0	0	0
MF	(Canada)	Daniel Imhof	2005–2009	99	**5**	61	2	33	3	0	0	0	0	0	0	0	0	94	**5**	5	0	0	0	0	0	0	0	0	0
GK	(Germany)	René Renno	2005–2010	14	**0**	11	0	3	0	0	0	0	0	0	0	0	0	14	**0**	0	0	0	0	0	0	0	0	0	0
FW	(Germany)	Benjamin Auer	2006; 2007–2008	21	**5**	19	5	0	0	0	0	0	0	0	0	0	0	19	**5**	2	0	0	0	0	0	0	0	0	0
GK	(Germany)	Alexander Bade	2006–2007	7	**0**	5	0	0	0	0	0	0	0	0	0	0	0	5	**0**	2	0	0	0	0	0	0	0	0	0
FW	(Brazil)	Fábio Júnior Pereira (Fábio Júnior)	2006–2007	33	**3**	16	2	15	1	0	0	0	0	0	0	0	0	31	**3**	2	0	0	0	0	0	0	0	0	0
FW	(Greece)	Theofanis Gekas	2006–2007	35	**22**	32	20	0	0	0	0	0	0	0	0	0	0	32	**20**	3	2	0	0	0	0	0	0	0	0
MF	(Germany)	Sebastian Hille	2006–2007	2	**0**	1	0	1	0	0	0	0	0	0	0	0	0	2	**0**	0	0	0	0	0	0	0	0	0	0
MF	(Croatia)	Ivo Iličević	2006–2007	27	**2**	25	2	0	0	0	0	0	0	0	0	0	0	25	**2**	2	0	0	0	0	0	0	0	0	0
DF	(Germany)	Benjamin Lense	2006–2007	9	**0**	8	0	0	0	0	0	0	0	0	0	0	0	8	**0**	1	0	0	0	0	0	0	0	0	0
DF	(Germany)	Lucas Oppermann	2006–2007	0	**0**	0	0	0	0	0	0	0	0	0	0	0	0	0	**0**	0	0	0	0	0	0	0	0	0	0
MF	(Germany)	Oliver Schröder	2006–2009	60	**1**	56	1	0	0	0	0	0	0	0	0	0	0	56	**1**	4	0	0	0	0	0	0	0	0	0
MF	(Germany)	Christoph Dabrowski	2006–2013	208	**24**	119	15	73	8	0	0	0	0	0	0	0	0	192	**23**	14	1	0	0	0	0	2	0	0	0
GK	(Czech Republic)	Jaroslav Drobný	2007	17	**0**	17	0	0	0	0	0	0	0	0	0	0	0	17	**0**	0	0	0	0	0	0	0	0	0	0
MF	(Germany)	Danny Fuchs	2007–2008	19	**1**	18	1	0	0	0	0	0	0	0	0	0	0	18	**1**	1	0	0	0	0	0	0	0	0	0
MF	(Germany)	İlkay Gündoğan	2007–2008	0	**0**	0	0	0	0	0	0	0	0	0	0	0	0	0	**0**	0	0	0	0	0	0	0	0	0	0
GK	(Czech Republic)	Jan Laštůvka	2007–2008	27	**0**	25	0	0	0	0	0	0	0	0	0	0	0	25	**0**	2	0	0	0	0	0	0	0	0	0
FW	(Austria)	Marc Sand	2007–2008	0	**0**	0	0	0	0	0	0	0	0	0	0	0	0	0	**0**	0	0	0	0	0	0	0	0	0	0
FW	(Poland)	Marcin Mięciel	2007–2009	41	**6**	37	6	0	0	0	0	0	0	0	0	0	0	37	**6**	4	0	0	0	0	0	0	0	0	0
MF	(Germany)	Heinrich Schmidtgal	2007–2009	0	**0**	0	0	0	0	0	0	0	0	0	0	0	0	0	**0**	0	0	0	0	0	0	0	0	0	0
MF	(Cameroon)	Joël Epalle	2007–2010	96	**8**	92	8	0	0	0	0	0	0	0	0	0	0	92	**8**	4	0	0	0	0	0	0	0	0	0
DF	(France)	Marc Pfertzel	2007–2010	82	**2**	73	2	3	0	0	0	0	0	0	0	0	0	76	**2**	6	0	0	0	0	0	0	0	0	0
FW	(Slovakia)	Stanislav Šesták	2007–2010; 2014–2015	120	**37**	86	28	27	9	0	0	0	0	0	0	0	0	113	**37**	7	0	0	0	0	0	0	0	0	0
DF	(Germany)	Mergim Mavraj	2007–2011	67	**1**	52	1	13	0	0	0	0	0	0	0	0	0	65	**1**	2	0	0	0	0	0	0	0	0	0
DF	(Algeria)	Antar Yahia	2007–2011	127	**7**	91	5	28	2	0	0	0	0	0	0	0	0	119	**7**	6	0	0	0	0	0	2	0	0	0
GK	(Germany)	Philipp Heerwagen	2007–2011; 2012–2013	47	**0**	33	0	11	0	0	0	0	0	0	0	0	0	44	**0**	3	0	0	0	0	0	0	0	0	0
DF	(Sweden)	Matias Concha	2007–2012	67	**0**	54	0	11	0	0	0	0	0	0	0	0	0	65	**0**	2	0	0	0	0	0	0	0	0	0
DF	(Germany)	Patrick Fabian	2007–2020	157	**5**	6	0	142	5	0	0	0	0	0	0	0	0	148	**5**	9	0	0	0	0	0	0	0	0	0
FW	(Ukraine)	Oleksiy Byelik	2008	4	**0**	4	0	0	0	0	0	0	0	0	0	0	0	4	**0**	0	0	0	0	0	0	0	0	0	0
DF	(Germany)	Jürgen Duah	2008–2009	0	**0**	0	0	0	0	0	0	0	0	0	0	0	0	0	**0**	0	0	0	0	0	0	0	0	0	0
FW	(Germany)	Sami El-Nounou	2008–2009	0	**0**	0	0	0	0	0	0	0	0	0	0	0	0	0	**0**	0	0	0	0	0	0	0	0	0	0
FW	(Turkey)	Dilaver Güçlü	2008–2009	0	**0**	0	0	0	0	0	0	0	0	0	0	0	0	0	**0**	0	0	0	0	0	0	0	0	0	0
FW	(Turkey)	Sinan Kaloğlu	2008–2009	19	**3**	18	3	0	0	0	0	0	0	0	0	0	0	18	**3**	1	0	0	0	0	0	0	0	0	0
GK	(Germany)	Andreas Lengsfeld	2008–2009	0	**0**	0	0	0	0	0	0	0	0	0	0	0	0	0	**0**	0	0	0	0	0	0	0	0	0	0
MF	(Japan)	Shinji Ono	2008–2009	32	**0**	29	0	0	0	0	0	0	0	0	0	0	0	29	**0**	3	0	0	0	0	0	0	0	0	0
GK	(Portugal)	Daniel Márcio Fernandes	2008–2010	34	**0**	32	0	0	0	0	0	0	0	0	0	0	0	32	**0**	2	0	0	0	0	0	0	0	0	0
DF	(Austria)	Christian Fuchs	2008–2010	57	**6**	53	6	0	0	0	0	0	0	0	0	0	0	53	**6**	4	0	0	0	0	0	0	0	0	0
MF	(Germany)	Mimoun Azaouagh	2008–2012	90	**11**	61	7	24	4	0	0	0	0	0	0	0	0	85	**11**	3	0	0	0	0	0	2	0	0	0
FW	(Argentina)	Diego Fernando Klimowicz	2009–2010	28	**8**	26	7	0	0	0	0	0	0	0	0	0	0	26	**7**	2	1	0	0	0	0	0	0	0	0
DF	(Germany)	Pascal Pellowski	2009–2010	0	**0**	0	0	0	0	0	0	0	0	0	0	0	0	0	**0**	0	0	0	0	0	0	0	0	0	0
MF	(Sweden)	Andreas Johansson	2009–2011	54	**0**	16	0	35	0	0	0	0	0	0	0	0	0	51	**0**	1	0	0	0	0	0	2	0	0	0
MF	(Germany)	Roman Prokoph	2009–2011	26	**0**	15	0	10	0	0	0	0	0	0	0	0	0	25	**0**	1	0	0	0	0	0	0	0	0	0
FW	(Slovenia)	Zlatko Dedić	2009–2011; 2012–2013	84	**19**	27	5	52	11	0	0	0	0	0	0	0	0	79	**16**	4	3	0	0	0	0	1	0	0	0
MF	(Germany)	Kevin Vogt	2009–2012	38	**2**	1	0	37	2	0	0	0	0	0	0	0	0	38	**2**	0	0	0	0	0	0	0	0	0	0
FW	(Germany)	Mirkan Aydın	2009–2014	85	**21**	1	0	76	20	0	0	0	0	0	0	0	0	77	**20**	6	1	0	0	0	0	2	0	0	0
GK	(Germany)	Andreas Luthe	2009–2016	169	**0**	3	0	154	0	0	0	0	0	0	0	0	0	157	**0**	10	0	0	0	0	0	2	0	0	0
MF	(Germany)	Lewis Holtby	2010	14	**2**	14	2	0	0	0	0	0	0	0	0	0	0	14	**2**	0	0	0	0	0	0	0	0	0	0
MF	(Serbia)	Miloš Marić	2010	22	**0**	13	0	8	0	0	0	0	0	0	0	0	0	21	**0**	1	0	0	0	0	0	0	0	0	0
FW	(North Korea)	Tae-se Chŏng	2010–2011	43	**15**	0	0	39	14	0	0	0	0	0	0	0	0	39	**14**	3	1	0	0	0	0	1	0	0	0
FW	(Turkey)	Mahir Sağlık	2010–2011	28	**3**	0	0	26	3	0	0	0	0	0	0	0	0	26	**3**	1	0	0	0	0	0	1	0	0	0
MF	(Germany)	Marc Rzatkowski	2010–2011; 2012–2013	33	**5**	0	0	29	4	0	0	0	0	0	0	0	0	29	**4**	4	1	0	0	0	0	0	0	0	0
MF	(Italy)	Giovanni Federico	2010–2012	63	**13**	0	0	57	11	0	0	0	0	0	0	0	0	57	**11**	4	2	0	0	0	0	2	0	0	0
MF	(Germany)	Oğuzhan Kefkır	2010–2012	10	**0**	1	0	8	0	0	0	0	0	0	0	0	0	9	**0**	1	0	0	0	0	0	0	0	0	0
DF	(Germany)	Björn Kopplin	2010–2012	64	**1**	0	0	60	1	0	0	0	0	0	0	0	0	60	**1**	3	0	0	0	0	0	1	0	0	0
DF	(Germany)	Matthias Ostrzolek	2010–2012	36	**0**	0	0	33	0	0	0	0	0	0	0	0	0	33	**0**	1	0	0	0	0	0	2	0	0	0
MF	(Germany)	Philip Semlits	2010–2012	0	**0**	0	0	0	0	0	0	0	0	0	0	0	0	0	**0**	0	0	0	0	0	0	0	0	0	0
MF	(Germany)	Faton Toski	2010–2013	46	**3**	0	0	41	3	0	0	0	0	0	0	0	0	41	**3**	3	0	0	0	0	0	2	0	0	0
GK	(Germany)	**Michael Esser**	2010–2015; 2021–	25	**0**	0	0	24	0	0	0	0	0	0	0	0	0	24	**0**	1	0	0	0	0	0	0	0	0	0
MF	(Austria)	Ümit Korkmaz	2011	13	**3**	0	0	12	3	0	0	0	0	0	0	0	0	12	**3**	0	0	0	0	0	0	1	0	0	0
MF	(Austria)	Denis Berger	2011–2012	17	**0**	0	0	16	0	0	0	0	0	0	0	0	0	16	**0**	1	0	0	0	0	0	0	0	0	0
FW	(Germany)	Daniel Ginczek	2011–2012	32	**7**	0	0	29	5	0	0	0	0	0	0	0	0	29	**5**	3	2	0	0	0	0	0	0	0	0
MF	(Japan)	Takashi Inui	2011–2012	32	**7**	0	0	30	7	0	0	0	0	0	0	0	0	30	**7**	2	0	0	0	0	0	0	0	0	0
MF	(Germany)	Enes Uzun	2011–2012	0	**0**	0	0	0	0	0	0	0	0	0	0	0	0	0	**0**	0	0	0	0	0	0	0	0	0	0
GK	(Germany)	Jonas Ermes	2011–2012; 2013–2014	0	**0**	0	0	0	0	0	0	0	0	0	0	0	0	0	**0**	0	0	0	0	0	0	0	0	0	0
MF	(Germany)	Christoph Kramer	2011–2013	67	**4**	0	0	61	4	0	0	0	0	0	0	0	0	61	**4**	6	0	0	0	0	0	0	0	0	0
DF	(Germany)	Jonas Acquistapace	2011–2014	75	**0**	0	0	69	0	0	0	0	0	0	0	0	0	69	**0**	6	0	0	0	0	0	0	0	0	0
DF	(Iceland)	Hólmar Örn Eyjólfsson	2011–2014	49	**1**	0	0	45	1	0	0	0	0	0	0	0	0	45	**1**	4	0	0	0	0	0	0	0	0	0
DF	(Germany)	Lukas Sinkiewicz	2011–2014	47	**2**	0	0	41	2	0	0	0	0	0	0	0	0	41	**2**	6	0	0	0	0	0	0	0	0	0
MF	(Germany)	Selim Gündüz	2011–2018	53	**4**	0	0	52	4	0	0	0	0	0	0	0	0	52	**4**	1	0	0	0	0	0	0	0	0	0
MF	(Germany)	Kevin Freiberger	2012	1	**0**	0	0	1	0	0	0	0	0	0	0	0	0	1	**0**	0	0	0	0	0	0	0	0	0	0
FW	(Ghana)	Hans Kyei	2012	0	**0**	0	0	0	0	0	0	0	0	0	0	0	0	0	**0**	0	0	0	0	0	0	0	0	0	0
MF	(Germany)	Christian Mengert	2012	0	**0**	0	0	0	0	0	0	0	0	0	0	0	0	0	**0**	0	0	0	0	0	0	0	0	0	0
GK	(Germany)	Markus Scholz	2012	0	**0**	0	0	0	0	0	0	0	0	0	0	0	0	0	**0**	0	0	0	0	0	0	0	0	0	0
MF	(Germany)	Sören Bertram	2012–2013	3	**0**	0	0	3	0	0	0	0	0	0	0	0	0	3	**0**	0	0	0	0	0	0	0	0	0	0
DF	(Germany)	Florian Brügmann	2012–2013	8	**1**	0	0	6	1	0	0	0	0	0	0	0	0	6	**1**	2	0	0	0	0	0	0	0	0	0
DF	(Germany)	Mounir Chaftar	2012–2013	23	**0**	0	0	22	0	0	0	0	0	0	0	0	0	22	**0**	1	0	0	0	0	0	0	0	0	0
MF	(Germany)	Michael Delura	2012–2013	18	**0**	0	0	17	0	0	0	0	0	0	0	0	0	17	**0**	1	0	0	0	0	0	0	0	0	0
FW	(Georgia (country))	Nikoloz Gelashvili	2012–2013	27	**2**	0	0	25	2	0	0	0	0	0	0	0	0	25	**2**	2	0	0	0	0	0	0	0	0	0
MF	(Germany)	Leon Goretzka	2012–2013	36	**4**	0	0	32	4	0	0	0	0	0	0	0	0	32	**4**	4	0	0	0	0	0	0	0	0	0
GK	(Portugal)	Daniel Heuer Fernandes	2012–2013	0	**0**	0	0	0	0	0	0	0	0	0	0	0	0	0	**0**	0	0	0	0	0	0	0	0	0	0
FW	(Georgia (country))	Aleksandre Iashvili	2012–2013	32	**1**	0	0	28	0	0	0	0	0	0	0	0	0	28	**0**	4	1	0	0	0	0	0	0	0	0
MF	(Colombia)	Michael Ortega	2012–2013	11	**1**	0	0	9	0	0	0	0	0	0	0	0	0	9	**0**	2	1	0	0	0	0	0	0	0	0
FW	(Germany)	Kevin Scheidhauer	2012–2013	21	**3**	0	0	19	3	0	0	0	0	0	0	0	0	19	**3**	2	0	0	0	0	0	0	0	0	0
FW	(Germany)	Daniel Engelbrecht	2012–2014	2	**0**	0	0	1	0	0	0	0	0	0	0	0	0	1	**0**	1	0	0	0	0	0	0	0	0	0
DF	(Germany)	Carsten Rothenbach	2012–2014	31	**0**	0	0	27	0	0	0	0	0	0	0	0	0	27	**0**	4	0	0	0	0	0	0	0	0	0
DF	(Germany)	Jannik Stevens	2012–2014	2	**0**	0	0	2	0	0	0	0	0	0	0	0	0	2	**0**	0	0	0	0	0	0	0	0	0	0
MF	(Japan)	Yusuke Tasaka	2012–2015	87	**9**	0	0	81	9	0	0	0	0	0	0	0	0	81	**9**	6	0	0	0	0	0	0	0	0	0
MF	(Turkey)	Onur Bulut	2012–2016	59	**5**	0	0	54	5	0	0	0	0	0	0	0	0	54	**5**	5	0	0	0	0	0	0	0	0	0
GK	(Germany)	Felix Dornebusch	2012–2019	11	**0**	0	0	9	0	0	0	0	0	0	0	0	0	9	**0**	2	0	0	0	0	0	0	0	0	0
MF	(Germany)	Sven Köhler	2013	0	**0**	0	0	0	0	0	0	0	0	0	0	0	0	0	**0**	0	0	0	0	0	0	0	0	0	0
DF	(Denmark)	Michael Lumb	2013	14	**0**	0	0	13	0	0	0	0	0	0	0	0	0	13	**0**	1	0	0	0	0	0	0	0	0	0
FW	(France)	Smail Morabit	2013	0	**0**	0	0	0	0	0	0	0	0	0	0	0	0	0	**0**	0	0	0	0	0	0	0	0	0	0
MF	(Germany)	Christian Silaj	2013	0	**0**	0	0	0	0	0	0	0	0	0	0	0	0	0	**0**	0	0	0	0	0	0	0	0	0	0
DF	(Germany)	Phil Spillmann	2013	0	**0**	0	0	0	0	0	0	0	0	0	0	0	0	0	**0**	0	0	0	0	0	0	0	0	0	0
DF	(Germany)	Rico Weiler	2013	0	**0**	0	0	0	0	0	0	0	0	0	0	0	0	0	**0**	0	0	0	0	0	0	0	0	0	0
GK	(Germany)	Sebastian Brune	2013–2014	0	**0**	0	0	0	0	0	0	0	0	0	0	0	0	0	**0**	0	0	0	0	0	0	0	0	0	0
FW	(Denmark)	Ken Ilsø	2013–2014	17	**2**	0	0	16	2	0	0	0	0	0	0	0	0	16	**2**	1	0	0	0	0	0	0	0	0	0
FW	(Croatia)	Mario Jelavić	2013–2014	0	**0**	0	0	0	0	0	0	0	0	0	0	0	0	0	**0**	0	0	0	0	0	0	0	0	0	0
MF	(Germany)	Florian Jungwirth	2013–2014	30	**1**	0	0	29	1	0	0	0	0	0	0	0	0	29	**1**	1	0	0	0	0	0	0	0	0	0
FW	(Germany)	Sven Kreyer	2013–2014	12	**1**	0	0	11	1	0	0	0	0	0	0	0	0	11	**1**	1	0	0	0	0	0	0	0	0	0
FW	(Germany)	Richard Sukuta-Pasu	2013–2014	34	**6**	0	0	32	6	0	0	0	0	0	0	0	0	32	**6**	2	0	0	0	0	0	0	0	0	0
MF	(Germany)	Christian Tiffert	2013–2014	25	**0**	0	0	24	0	0	0	0	0	0	0	0	0	24	**0**	1	0	0	0	0	0	0	0	0	0
DF	(Germany)	Felix Bastians	2013–2014; 2015–2018	99	**9**	0	0	92	9	0	0	0	0	0	0	0	0	92	**9**	7	0	0	0	0	0	0	0	0	0
MF	(Norway)	Henrik Gulden	2013–2015	4	**0**	0	0	3	0	0	0	0	0	0	0	0	0	3	**0**	1	0	0	0	0	0	0	0	0	0
DF	(Germany)	Fabian Holthaus	2013–2015	11	**0**	0	0	9	0	0	0	0	0	0	0	0	0	9	**0**	2	0	0	0	0	0	0	0	0	0
MF	(Germany)	Danny Latza	2013–2015	68	**4**	0	0	64	3	0	0	0	0	0	0	0	0	64	**3**	4	1	0	0	0	0	0	0	0	0
FW	(Germany)	Joel Reinholz	2013–2015	0	**0**	0	0	0	0	0	0	0	0	0	0	0	0	0	**0**	0	0	0	0	0	0	0	0	0	0
MF	(Germany)	Julian Stock	2013–2015	0	**0**	0	0	0	0	0	0	0	0	0	0	0	0	0	**0**	0	0	0	0	0	0	0	0	0	0
MF	(Bosnia and Herzegovina)	Adnan Zahirović	2013–2015	24	**1**	0	0	22	1	0	0	0	0	0	0	0	0	22	**1**	2	0	0	0	0	0	0	0	0	0
MF	(Poland)	Piotr Ćwielong	2013–2016	41	**3**	0	0	39	1	0	0	0	0	0	0	0	0	39	**1**	2	2	0	0	0	0	0	0	0	0
DF	(Ghana)	Jan Gyamerah	2013–2019	76	**1**	0	0	74	1	0	0	0	0	0	0	0	0	74	**1**	2	0	0	0	0	0	0	0	0	0
FW	(Germany)	Moritz Göttel	2014	0	**0**	0	0	0	0	0	0	0	0	0	0	0	0	0	**0**	0	0	0	0	0	0	0	0	0	0
DF	(Germany)	Daniel Heber	2014	0	**0**	0	0	0	0	0	0	0	0	0	0	0	0	0	**0**	0	0	0	0	0	0	0	0	0	0
DF	(Germany)	Lukas Klostermann	2014	9	**0**	0	0	9	0	0	0	0	0	0	0	0	0	9	**0**	0	0	0	0	0	0	0	0	0	0
FW	(Russia)	Laurynas Kulikas	2014	0	**0**	0	0	0	0	0	0	0	0	0	0	0	0	0	**0**	0	0	0	0	0	0	0	0	0	0
DF	(Germany)	Nicolas Abdat	2014–2015	6	**0**	0	0	6	0	0	0	0	0	0	0	0	0	6	**0**	0	0	0	0	0	0	0	0	0	0
FW	(Finland)	Mikael Forssell	2014–2015	17	**3**	0	0	16	3	0	0	0	0	0	0	0	0	16	**3**	1	0	0	0	0	0	0	0	0	0
FW	(Austria)	Michael Gregoritsch	2014–2015	27	**7**	0	0	25	7	0	0	0	0	0	0	0	0	25	**7**	2	0	0	0	0	0	0	0	0	0
DF	(Germany)	Norman Jakubowski	2014–2015	0	**0**	0	0	0	0	0	0	0	0	0	0	0	0	0	**0**	0	0	0	0	0	0	0	0	0	0
GK	(Germany)	Marius Weeke	2014–2015	0	**0**	0	0	0	0	0	0	0	0	0	0	0	0	0	**0**	0	0	0	0	0	0	0	0	0	0
DF	(Germany)	Malcolm Cacutalua	2014–2016	34	**0**	0	0	32	0	0	0	0	0	0	0	0	0	32	**0**	2	0	0	0	0	0	0	0	0	0
FW	(Germany)	Cagatay Kader	2014–2016	0	**0**	0	0	0	0	0	0	0	0	0	0	0	0	0	**0**	0	0	0	0	0	0	0	0	0	0
DF	(Germany)	Frederik Lach	2014–2016	0	**0**	0	0	0	0	0	0	0	0	0	0	0	0	0	**0**	0	0	0	0	0	0	0	0	0	0
DF	(Poland)	David Niepsuj	2014–2016	0	**0**	0	0	0	0	0	0	0	0	0	0	0	0	0	**0**	0	0	0	0	0	0	0	0	0	0
DF	(Czech Republic)	Jan Šimůnek	2014–2016	15	**0**	0	0	12	0	0	0	0	0	0	0	0	0	12	**0**	3	0	0	0	0	0	0	0	0	0
FW	(Germany)	Simon Terodde	2014–2016	72	**47**	0	0	66	41	0	0	0	0	0	0	0	0	66	**41**	6	6	0	0	0	0	0	0	0	0
MF	(Germany)	Marco Terrazzino	2014–2016	65	**12**	0	0	60	10	0	0	0	0	0	0	0	0	60	**10**	5	2	0	0	0	0	0	0	0	0
MF	(Germany)	Tobias Weis	2014–2016	18	**2**	0	0	15	2	0	0	0	0	0	0	0	0	15	**2**	3	0	0	0	0	0	0	0	0	0
DF	(Germany)	Stefano Celozzi	2014–2020	138	**1**	0	0	128	1	0	0	0	0	0	0	0	0	128	**1**	10	0	0	0	0	0	0	0	0	0
MF	(France)	**Anthony Losilla**	2014–	237	**15**	0	0	223	15	0	0	0	0	0	0	0	0	223	**15**	14	0	0	0	0	0	0	0	0	0
DF	(Germany)	Timo Perthel	2014–2019	81	**1**	0	0	74	1	0	0	0	0	0	0	0	0	74	**1**	7	0	0	0	0	0	0	0	0	0
MF	(Turkey)	Ridvan Balci	2015	1	**0**	0	0	1	0	0	0	0	0	0	0	0	0	1	**0**	0	0	0	0	0	0	0	0	0	0
DF	(Germany)	Erdinç Karakaş	2015	0	**0**	0	0	0	0	0	0	0	0	0	0	0	0	0	**0**	0	0	0	0	0	0	0	0	0	0
MF	(Germany)	Gazi Siala	2015	0	**0**	0	0	0	0	0	0	0	0	0	0	0	0	0	**0**	0	0	0	0	0	0	0	0	0	0
MF	(Germany)	Thomas Eisfeld	2015; 2015–2021	124	**11**	0	0	116	11	0	0	0	0	0	0	0	0	116	**11**	8	0	0	0	0	0	0	0	0	0
MF	(Germany)	Janik Haberer	2015–2016	37	**4**	0	0	33	3	0	0	0	0	0	0	0	0	33	**3**	4	1	0	0	0	0	0	0	0	0
MF	(Curaçao)	Michaël Maria	2015–2016	9	**0**	0	0	9	0	0	0	0	0	0	0	0	0	9	**0**	0	0	0	0	0	0	0	0	0	0
FW	(Angola)	Nando Rafael	2015–2016	8	**1**	0	0	8	1	0	0	0	0	0	0	0	0	8	**1**	0	0	0	0	0	0	0	0	0	0
DF	(Netherlands)	Giliano Wijnaldum	2015–2016	9	**0**	0	0	7	0	0	0	0	0	0	0	0	0	7	**0**	2	0	0	0	0	0	0	0	0	0
MF	(Germany)	Roman Zengin	2015–2016	0	**0**	0	0	0	0	0	0	0	0	0	0	0	0	0	**0**	0	0	0	0	0	0	0	0	0	0
MF	(Germany)	Tom Baack	2015–2019	4	**0**	0	0	4	0	0	0	0	0	0	0	0	0	4	**0**	0	0	0	0	0	0	0	0	0	0
DF	(Germany)	Gökhan Gül	2015–2017	2	**0**	0	0	2	0	0	0	0	0	0	0	0	0	2	**0**	0	0	0	0	0	0	0	0	0	0
DF	(Germany)	Tim Hoogland	2015–2019	125	**8**	0	0	118	7	0	0	0	0	0	0	0	0	118	**7**	7	1	0	0	0	0	0	0	0	0
FW	(Togo)	Peniel Mlapa	2015–2017	65	**13**	0	0	61	13	0	0	0	0	0	0	0	0	61	**13**	4	0	0	0	0	0	0	0	0	0
FW	(Lithuania)	Arvydas Novikovas	2015–2017	20	**0**	0	0	20	0	0	0	0	0	0	0	0	0	20	**0**	0	0	0	0	0	0	0	0	0	0
FW	(Greece)	Vangelis Pavlidis	2015–2018	4	**0**	0	0	4	0	0	0	0	0	0	0	0	0	4	**0**	0	0	0	0	0	0	0	0	0	0
GK	(Germany)	**Manuel Riemann**	2015–	184	**0**	0	0	174	0	0	0	0	0	0	0	0	0	174	**0**	10	0	0	0	0	0	0	0	0	0
MF	(Germany)	Görkem Sağlam	2015–2020	30	**2**	0	0	29	1	0	0	0	0	0	0	0	0	29	**1**	1	1	0	0	0	0	0	0	0	0
MF	(Germany)	Jannik Bandowski	2016–2019	10	**2**	0	0	9	1	0	0	0	0	0	0	0	0	9	**1**	1	1	0	0	0	0	0	0	0	0
MF	(United States)	Russell Canouse	2016–2017	20	**1**	0	0	20	1	0	0	0	0	0	0	0	0	20	**1**	0	0	0	0	0	0	0	0	0	0
DF	(Poland)	Paweł Dawidowicz	2016–2017	17	**0**	0	0	17	0	0	0	0	0	0	0	0	0	17	**0**	0	0	0	0	0	0	0	0	0	0
MF	(Armenia)	Hayk Galstyan	2016–2017	0	**0**	0	0	0	0	0	0	0	0	0	0	0	0	0	**0**	0	0	0	0	0	0	0	0	0	0
GK	(Poland)	Martin Kompalla	2016–2018	0	**0**	0	0	0	0	0	0	0	0	0	0	0	0	0	**0**	0	0	0	0	0	0	0	0	0	0
MF	(Germany)	Tim Krafft	2016–2017	0	**0**	0	0	0	0	0	0	0	0	0	0	0	0	0	**0**	0	0	0	0	0	0	0	0	0	0
GK	(Germany)	Florian Kraft	2016–2018	0	**0**	0	0	0	0	0	0	0	0	0	0	0	0	0	**0**	0	0	0	0	0	0	0	0	0	0
DF	(Germany)	**Maxim Leitsch**	2016–	72	**0**	0	0	68	0	0	0	0	0	0	0	0	0	68	**0**	4	0	0	0	0	0	0	0	0	0
MF	(Kazakhstan)	Alexander Merkel	2016–2018	14	**0**	0	0	13	0	0	0	0	0	0	0	0	0	13	**0**	1	0	0	0	0	0	0	0	0	0
FW	(Germany)	Nils Quaschner	2016–2017	27	**3**	0	0	26	3	0	0	0	0	0	0	0	0	26	**3**	1	0	0	0	0	0	0	0	0	0
DF	(Germany)	Nico Rieble	2016–2018	21	**0**	0	0	21	0	0	0	0	0	0	0	0	0	21	**0**	0	0	0	0	0	0	0	0	0	0
MF	(Germany)	Marco Stiepermann	2016–2017	32	**2**	0	0	31	1	0	0	0	0	0	0	0	0	31	**1**	1	1	0	0	0	0	0	0	0	0
MF	(Austria)	Kevin Stöger	2016–2018	40	**7**	0	0	37	5	0	0	0	0	0	0	0	0	37	**5**	3	2	0	0	0	0	0	0	0	0
MF	(Germany)	**Tom Weilandt**	2016–2017; 2018–	74	**12**	0	0	71	12	0	0	0	0	0	0	0	0	71	**12**	3	0	0	0	0	0	0	0	0	0
FW	(Germany)	Johannes Wurtz	2016–2018	65	**9**	0	0	61	9	0	0	0	0	0	0	0	0	61	**9**	4	0	0	0	0	0	0	0	0	0
MF	(Austria)	Dominik Wydra	2016–2017	13	**1**	0	0	13	1	0	0	0	0	0	0	0	0	13	**1**	0	0	0	0	0	0	0	0	0	0
MF	(Germany)	Ulrich Bapoh	2017–2018; 2019–2020	5	**1**	0	0	4	1	0	0	0	0	0	0	0	0	4	**1**	1	0	0	0	0	0	0	0	0	0
MF	(Germany)	Vitaly Janelt	2017–2020	54	**2**	0	0	53	2	0	0	0	0	0	0	0	0	53	**2**	1	0	0	0	0	0	0	0	0	0
DF	(Germany)	Moise Ngwisani	2017	0	**0**	0	0	0	0	0	0	0	0	0	0	0	0	0	**0**	0	0	0	0	0	0	0	0	0	0
FW	(Greece)	Dimitrios Diamantakos	2017–2018	10	**2**	0	0	9	2	0	0	0	0	0	0	0	0	9	**2**	1	0	0	0	0	0	0	0	0	0
DF	(Germany)	Luke Hemmerich	2017–2018	8	**0**	0	0	7	0	0	0	0	0	0	0	0	0	7	**0**	1	0	0	0	0	0	0	0	0	0
FW	(Austria)	Lukas Hinterseer	2017–2019	65	**35**	0	0	62	32	0	0	0	0	0	0	0	0	62	**32**	3	3	0	0	0	0	0	0	0	0
FW	(Australia)	Robbie Kruse	2017–2019	45	**8**	0	0	44	8	0	0	0	0	0	0	0	0	44	**8**	1	0	0	0	0	0	0	0	0	0
FW	(Germany)	Sidney Sam	2017–2019	43	**2**	0	0	42	2	0	0	0	0	0	0	0	0	42	**2**	1	0	0	0	0	0	0	0	0	0
DF	(Brazil)	**Danilo Soares**	2017–	125	**3**	0	0	117	3	0	0	0	0	0	0	0	0	117	**3**	8	0	0	0	0	0	0	0	0	0
MF	(Germany)	**Robert Tesche**	2017–	110	**13**	0	0	107	12	0	0	0	0	0	0	0	0	107	**12**	3	1	0	0	0	0	0	0	0	0
MF	(Germany)	Julian Tomas	2017–2018	0	**0**	0	0	0	0	0	0	0	0	0	0	0	0	0	**0**	0	0	0	0	0	0	0	0	0	0
MF	(Azerbaijan)	**Baris Ekincier**	2017–2019; 2020–	2	**0**	0	0	1	0	0	0	0	0	0	0	0	0	1	**0**	1	0	0	0	0	0	0	0	0	0
MF	(Turkey)	Sergio Gucciardo	2017–2018	0	**0**	0	0	0	0	0	0	0	0	0	0	0	0	0	**0**	0	0	0	0	0	0	0	0	0	0
DF	(Germany)	Jannis Fraundörfer	2017–2018	0	**0**	0	0	0	0	0	0	0	0	0	0	0	0	0	**0**	0	0	0	0	0	0	0	0	0	0
FW	(Germany)	Enes Schick	2017–2018	0	**0**	0	0	0	0	0	0	0	0	0	0	0	0	0	**0**	0	0	0	0	0	0	0	0	0	0
DF	(Germany)	Nico Pulver	2017–2018	0	**0**	0	0	0	0	0	0	0	0	0	0	0	0	0	**0**	0	0	0	0	0	0	0	0	0	0
DF	(Germany)	Jan Wellers	2018–2020	0	**0**	0	0	0	0	0	0	0	0	0	0	0	0	0	**0**	0	0	0	0	0	0	0	0	0	0
DF	(Germany)	Phillip Aboagye	2018–2019	0	**0**	0	0	0	0	0	0	0	0	0	0	0	0	0	**0**	0	0	0	0	0	0	0	0	0	0
MF	(Kosovo)	Gentrit Limani	2018–2019	0	**0**	0	0	0	0	0	0	0	0	0	0	0	0	0	**0**	0	0	0	0	0	0	0	0	0	0
DF	(Germany)	Simon Lorenz	2018; 2019–2020	17	**1**	0	0	16	1	0	0	0	0	0	0	0	0	16	**1**	1	0	0	0	0	0	0	0	0	0
DF	(Germany)	Philipp Ochs	2018	5	**0**	0	0	5	0	0	0	0	0	0	0	0	0	5	**0**	0	0	0	0	0	0	0	0	0	0
FW	(Germany)	Janni Serra	2018	12	**0**	0	0	12	0	0	0	0	0	0	0	0	0	12	**0**	0	0	0	0	0	0	0	0	0	0
DF	(Germany)	**Armel Bella-Kotchap**	2018–	48	**1**	0	0	44	1	0	0	0	0	0	0	0	0	44	**1**	4	0	0	0	0	0	0	0	0	0
FW	(Republic of the Congo)	**Silvère Ganvoula**	2018–	84	**23**	0	0	78	20	0	0	0	0	0	0	0	0	78	**20**	6	3	0	0	0	0	0	0	0	0
GK	(Germany)	**Paul Grave**	2018–	0	**0**	0	0	0	0	0	0	0	0	0	0	0	0	0	**0**	0	0	0	0	0	0	0	0	0	0
MF	(Germany)	**Lars Holtkamp**	2018–2021; 2021–	1	**0**	0	0	0	0	0	0	0	0	0	0	0	0	0	**0**	1	0	0	0	0	0	0	0	0	0
MF	(South Korea)	Chung-yong Lee	2018–2020	37	**1**	0	0	35	1	0	0	0	0	0	0	0	0	35	**1**	2	0	0	0	0	0	0	0	0	0
MF	(Germany)	Sebastian Maier	2018–2021	26	**0**	0	0	25	0	0	0	0	0	0	0	0	0	25	**0**	1	0	0	0	0	0	0	0	0	0
MF	(Germany)	Michael Martin	2018–2019	0	**0**	0	0	0	0	0	0	0	0	0	0	0	0	0	**0**	0	0	0	0	0	0	0	0	0	0
MF	(Serbia)	**Miloš Pantović**	2018–	68	**5**	0	0	63	4	0	0	0	0	0	0	0	0	63	**4**	5	1	0	0	0	0	0	0	0	0
DF	(Germany)	Moritz Römling	2018–2021	4	**0**	0	0	4	0	0	0	0	0	0	0	0	0	4	**0**	0	0	0	0	0	0	0	0	0	0
MF	(Germany)	Furkan Sağman	2018–2019	0	**0**	0	0	0	0	0	0	0	0	0	0	0	0	0	**0**	0	0	0	0	0	0	0	0	0	0
FW	(Turkey)	Ömer Uzun	2018–2019	0	**0**	0	0	0	0	0	0	0	0	0	0	0	0	0	**0**	0	0	0	0	0	0	0	0	0	0
GK	(Germany)	Joshua Wehking	2018–2019	0	**0**	0	0	0	0	0	0	0	0	0	0	0	0	0	**0**	0	0	0	0	0	0	0	0	0	0
FW	(Turkey)	Okan-Mete Yilmaz	2018–2019	0	**0**	0	0	0	0	0	0	0	0	0	0	0	0	0	**0**	0	0	0	0	0	0	0	0	0	0
DF	(Austria)	Dominik Baumgartner	2019–2020	12	**1**	0	0	11	1	0	0	0	0	0	0	0	0	11	**1**	1	0	0	0	0	0	0	0	0	0
DF	(Greece)	Stylianos Kokovas	2019–2021	6	**0**	0	0	6	0	0	0	0	0	0	0	0	0	6	**0**	0	0	0	0	0	0	0	0	0	0
FW	(Germany)	**Simon Zoller**	2019–	68	**24**	0	0	63	23	0	0	0	0	0	0	0	0	63	**23**	5	1	0	0	0	0	0	0	0	0
FW	(Germany)	**Danny Blum**	2019–	50	**13**	0	0	47	13	0	0	0	0	0	0	0	0	47	**13**	3	0	0	0	0	0	0	0	0	0
DF	(Switzerland)	**Saulo Decarli**	2019–	29	**1**	0	0	27	1	0	0	0	0	0	0	0	0	27	**1**	2	0	0	0	0	0	0	0	0	0
GK	(Germany)	Patrick Drewes	2019–2021	9	**0**	0	0	7	0	0	0	0	0	0	0	0	0	7	**0**	2	0	0	0	0	0	0	0	0	0
DF	(Germany)	Maxwell Gyamfi	2019–2020	0	**0**	0	0	0	0	0	0	0	0	0	0	0	0	0	**0**	0	0	0	0	0	0	0	0	0	0
DF	(England)	Jordi Osei-Tutu	2019–2020	22	**5**	0	0	21	5	0	0	0	0	0	0	0	0	21	**5**	1	0	0	0	0	0	0	0	0	0
DF	(Costa Rica)	**Cristian Gamboa**	2019–	58	**1**	0	0	55	1	0	0	0	0	0	0	0	0	55	**1**	3	0	0	0	0	0	0	0	0	0
FW	(Germany)	Manuel Wintzheimer	2019–2020	21	**3**	0	0	20	3	0	0	0	0	0	0	0	0	20	**3**	1	0	0	0	0	0	0	0	0	0
MF	(Germany)	**Luis Hartwig**	2020–	1	**0**	0	0	1	0	0	0	0	0	0	0	0	0	1	**0**	0	0	0	0	0	0	0	0	0	0
DF	(Greece)	**Vasilis Lampropoulos**	2020–	20	**0**	0	0	19	0	0	0	0	0	0	0	0	0	19	**0**	1	0	0	0	0	0	0	0	0	0
MF	(Austria)	Robert Žulj	2020–2021	45	**17**	0	0	42	16	0	0	0	0	0	0	0	0	42	**16**	3	1	0	0	0	0	0	0	0	0
DF	(Uganda)	**Herbert Bockhorn**	2020–	26	**1**	0	0	24	1	0	0	0	0	0	0	0	0	24	**1**	2	0	0	0	0	0	0	0	0	0
FW	(Germany)	**Tarsis Bonga**	2020–	12	**0**	0	0	11	0	0	0	0	0	0	0	0	0	11	**0**	1	0	0	0	0	0	0	0	0	0
MF	(Ghana)	**Raman Chibsah**	2020–	11	**1**	0	0	10	1	0	0	0	0	0	0	0	0	10	**1**	1	0	0	0	0	0	0	0	0	0
FW	(Germany)	**Gerrit Holtmann**	2020–	33	**5**	0	0	30	4	0	0	0	0	0	0	0	0	30	**4**	3	1	0	0	0	0	0	0	0	0
FW	(Hungary)	**Soma Novothny**	2020–	15	**2**	0	0	14	2	0	0	0	0	0	0	0	0	14	**2**	1	0	0	0	0	0	0	0	0	0
DF	(Serbia)	**Erhan Mašović**	2020–	10	**0**	0	0	8	0	0	0	0	0	0	0	0	0	8	**0**	2	0	0	0	0	0	0	0	0	0
DF	(Germany)	**Verthomy Boboy**	2020–	0	**0**	0	0	0	0	0	0	0	0	0	0	0	0	0	**0**	0	0	0	0	0	0	0	0	0	0
MF	(Germany)	Gabriel Čavar	2020–2021	0	**0**	0	0	0	0	0	0	0	0	0	0	0	0	0	**0**	0	0	0	0	0	0	0	0	0	0
GK	(Germany)	**Tjark Ernst**	2020–	0	**0**	0	0	0	0	0	0	0	0	0	0	0	0	0	**0**	0	0	0	0	0	0	0	0	0	0
MF	(Japan)	**Takuma Asano**	2021–	0	**0**	0	0	0	0	0	0	0	0	0	0	0	0	0	**0**	0	0	0	0	0	0	0	0	0	0
MF	(Ghana)	**Christopher Antwi-Adjei**	2021–	0	**0**	0	0	0	0	0	0	0	0	0	0	0	0	0	**0**	0	0	0	0	0	0	0	0	0	0
MF	(Germany)	**Patrick Osterhage**	2021–	0	**0**	0	0	0	0	0	0	0	0	0	0	0	0	0	**0**	0	0	0	0	0	0	0	0	0	0
MF	(Germany)	**Eduard Löwen**	2021–	0	**0**	0	0	0	0	0	0	0	0	0	0	0	0	0	**0**	0	0	0	0	0	0	0	0	0	0

=== Women ===
As of 22 May 2019

Player				Overall		League						Cup			
Player				Overall		2.BL		RL-W		Total		DFB-P		W-P	
Pos	Nat	Name	Years	A	G	A	G	A	G	A	G	A	G	A	G
MF	(Germany)	Mirja Kothe	2010-2011	23	10	0	0	19	9	19	9	1	0	3	1
MF	(Germany)	Katharina Leiding	2010-2011	25	1	0	0	21	1	21	1	1	0	3	0
FW	(Germany)	Katrin Schröder	2010-2011	19	4	0	0	16	4	16	4	0	0	3	0
DF	(Germany)	Anne-Britt Wehr	2010-2011	17	1	0	0	14	1	14	1	1	0	2	0
MF	(Germany)	Hue-man Cao	2010-2012	49	3	0	0	41	3	41	3	2	0	6	0
FW	(Germany)	Carolin Ekamp	2010-2012	39	20	0	0	34	15	34	15	1	0	4	5
MF	(Germany)	Sarah Herdemerten	2010-2012	14	1	0	0	11	0	11	0	0	0	3	1
GK	(Germany)	Ninon Kalpein	2010-2012	6	0	0	0	1	0	1	0	1	0	4	0
DF	(Germany)	Hannah Mues	2010-2012	29	1	0	0	21	1	21	1	1	0	7	0
DF	(Germany)	Ann-Christin Rittmeier	2010-2012	44	4	0	0	38	2	38	2	2	0	4	2
GK	(Germany)	Maike Vogler	2010-2012; 2015-2018	128	0	0	0	115	0	115	0	3	0	10	0
MF	(Germany)	Kora Wölm	2010-2012	41	7	0	0	34	5	34	5	1	0	6	2
MF	(Germany)	Wiebke Neuhaus	2010-2012; 2014-2018	101	8	9	1	76	5	85	6	4	0	12	2
FW	(Germany)	Sabrina Kleifges	2010-2013	79	23	0	0	69	20	69	20	1	0	9	3
DF	(Germany)	Laura Kill	2010-2014; 2015-2017	133	26	12	3	101	18	113	21	6	1	14	4
MF	(Germany)	Julia Zumdick	2010-2014	39	9	2	0	30	5	32	5	2	0	5	4
MF	(Germany)	**Janine Angrick**	2010-2015; 2018-	149	42	40	3	93	29	133	32	7	3	9	7
DF	(Germany)	Nathalie Bock	2010-2015	132	13	42	2	73	10	115	12	6	0	11	1
FW	(Germany)	Lena Schüth	2011-2012	36	23	0	0	31	19	31	19	1	0	4	4
GK	(Germany)	Jana Biebusch	2011-2012	14	0	0	0	11	0	11	0	0	0	3	0
MF	(Germany)	Vanessa Hannig	2011-2012	8	1	0	0	6	1	6	1	1	0	1	0
FW	(Germany)	Inga Hinkerode	2011-2013	37	21	0	0	32	19	32	19	1	0	4	2
MF	(Turkey)	Ayşe Kara	2011-2013	18	1	0	0	15	0	15	0	1	0	2	1
MF	(Germany)	Janine Ganser	2011-2014	53	5	8	1	38	3	46	4	3	0	4	1
MF	(Germany)	Ana Schönenberg	2011-2014	18	1	0	0	16	1	16	1	0	0	2	0
DF	(Germany)	Laura Hoffmann	2011-2015; 2017-2018	83	8	30	0	44	5	74	5	4	0	5	3
MF	(Germany)	Lisa Josten	2011-2015	88	24	43	8	36	11	79	19	5	2	4	3
MF	(Germany)	Daniela Ließem	2011-2015	90	23	38	4	41	11	79	15	5	4	6	4
GK	(Germany)	Stephanie Herkrath	2012-2013	16	0	0	0	15	0	15	0	0	0	1	0
FW	(Germany)	Julia Kunert	2012-2013	1	0	0	0	0	0	0	0	0	0	1	0
MF	(Germany)	Sabrina Maihöfer	2012-2013	15	0	0	0	11	0	11	0	0	0	4	0
DF	(Germany)	Nora Steinsträter	2012-2013	18	0	0	0	15	0	15	0	0	0	3	0
MF	(Germany)	Frauke Drews	2012-2014; 2015-2016	33	18	10	3	21	14	31	17	0	0	2	1
MF	(Germany)	Theresa Gosch	2012-2015	31	5	28	4	0	0	28	4	2	1	1	0
FW	(Germany)	Dörthe Hoppius	2012-2014	50	28	22	9	21	16	43	25	3	3	4	0
MF	(Germany)	Laura Kühn	2012-2014	35	5	6	0	24	4	30	4	2	0	3	1
DF	(Germany)	Anna Tatenhorst	2012-2015	14	0	10	0	1	0	11	0	2	0	1	0
DF	(Germany)	Carina Grendel	2012-2017	119	1	42	0	65	1	107	1	6	0	6	0
MF	(Germany)	**Tiana Kalamanda**	2012-	114	44	26	3	78	37	104	40	2	0	8	4
MF	(Namibia)	Thomalina Adams	2013-2014	15	0	13	0	0	0	13	0	2	0	0	0
MF	(Germany)	Jessica Bade	2013-2014	2	0	2	0	0	0	2	0	0	0	0	0
DF	(Germany)	Laura Kuhlmann	2013-2014	10	0	9	0	0	0	9	0	1	0	0	0
GK	(Germany)	Anna-Marie Mistol	2013-2014	0	0	0	0	0	0	0	0	0	0	0	0
FW	(Germany)	Sarah Grünheid	2013-2015	47	27	42	23	0	0	42	23	5	4	0	0
FW	(Germany)	**Burcu Özkanca**	2013-2015; 2018-	30	5	16	3	11	2	27	5	3	0	0	0
GK	(Germany)	Lara Stober	2013-2015	14	0	13	0	0	0	13	0	1	0	0	0
GK	(Austria)	Anna Wegschneider	2013-2015	17	0	12	0	2	0	14	0	3	0	0	0
FW	(Germany)	Anna Maiwald	2014-2018	86	6	9	1	66	3	75	4	3	0	8	2
GK	(Germany)	Carina Schlüter	2014-2015	24	0	23	0	0	0	23	0	1	0	0	0
DF	(Germany)	Franziska Bröckl	2014-2016	39	2	20	0	16	2	36	2	1	0	2	0
MF	(Germany)	**Laura Buczkowski**	2014-	83	23	8	0	63	21	71	21	3	0	9	2
MF	(Germany)	**Melanie Heep**	2014-	125	15	22	1	89	8	101	9	4	2	10	4
FW	(Germany)	Merja Kurz	2014-2015	5	0	4	0	0	0	4	0	1	0	0	0
MF	(Germany)	Magdalena Richter	2014-2015	23	8	21	5	0	0	21	5	2	3	0	0
DF	(Germany)	Sara-Lena Scholte	2014-2015	5	0	4	0	0	0	4	0	1	0	0	0
FW	(Germany)	Jennifer Steinbrück	2014-2015	5	1	3	0	0	0	3	0	2	1	0	0
MF	(Germany)	Sarinah Beck	2014-2015	0	0	0	0	0	0	0	0	0	0	0	0
MF	(Germany)	Nadine Kraus	2015-2016	33	3	6	0	23	2	29	2	1	0	3	1
DF	(Germany)	Johanna Behrens	2015-2016	1	0	0	0	0	0	0	0	0	0	1	0
FW	(Germany)	Angelina Brück	2015-2016	25	2	0	0	22	2	22	2	1	0	2	0
MF	(Germany)	**Celina Buczkowski**	2015-	53	9	0	0	46	7	46	7	1	0	6	2
MF	(Italy)	Fabiana Colalongo	2015	0	0	0	0	0	0	0	0	0	0	0	0
DF	(Germany)	Deborah Diekmann	2015-2018	15	0	0	0	11	0	11	0	1	0	3	0
GK	(Germany)	Elena Fischer	2015-2016	1	0	0	0	0	0	0	0	0	0	1	0
MF	(Germany)	Larah Ludwig	2015-2017	4	1	0	0	3	1	3	1	0	0	1	0
FW	(Germany)	**Marie Lümmer**	2015-	92	10	0	0	82	8	82	8	1	0	9	2
DF	(Germany)	**Chantal Meißner**	2015-	92	14	0	0	83	13	83	13	0	0	9	1
DF	(Azerbaijan)	Adelina Neziri	2015-2016	0	0	0	0	0	0	0	0	0	0	0	0
MF	(Germany)	Michelle Noetzel	2015-2017	16	1	0	0	13	0	13	0	1	0	2	1
DF	(Germany)	Marie Raeth	2015	0	0	0	0	0	0	0	0	0	0	0	0
DF	(Germany)	Sarah Schubart	2015-2016	1	0	0	0	1	0	1	0	0	0	0	0
GK	(Germany)	Kim Stawowy	2015-2016	5	0	0	0	4	0	4	0	0	0	1	0
DF	(Germany)	Ann-Sophie Vogel	2015-2016	26	3	0	0	22	1	22	1	1	0	3	2
MF	(Germany)	Juliane Wiemann	2015-2017	17	0	0	0	16	0	16	0	0	0	1	0
DF	(Germany)	**Mara Wilhelm**	2015-	90	33	0	0	70	30	70	30	1	0	9	3
MF	(Germany)	**Amelie Fölsing**	2016; 2018-	29	5	0	0	27	5	27	5	0	0	2	0
MF	(Germany)	Leonie Küstermeier	2016-2017	10	0	0	0	8	0	8	0	0	0	2	0
FW	(Germany)	Eleni Michoglou	2016-2018	7	0	0	0	6	0	6	0	1	0	0	0
DF	(Poland)	Oliwia Woś	2016	2	0	0	0	2	0	2	0	0	0	0	0
MF	(Germany)	Anna Delseith	2016-2017	2	0	0	0	1	0	1	0	0	0	1	0
MF	(Germany)	**Celine Demirönal**	2016-2017; 2018-	45	21	0	0	38	16	38	16	0	0	7	5
GK	(Germany)	Melissa Fuchs	2016-2017	2	0	0	0	0	0	0	0	0	0	2	0
MF	(Germany)	Vivien Gaj	2016-2018	33	14	0	0	27	9	27	9	1	0	5	5
GK	(Turkey)	Dilara Hamurcu	2016-2017	1	0	0	0	1	0	1	0	0	0	0	0
MF	(Germany)	Eileen Hillmann	2016-2017	13	0	0	0	11	0	11	0	0	0	2	0
FW	(Germany)	Kristina Kirscht	2016	12	4	0	0	10	1	10	1	0	0	2	3
MF	(Germany)	Sonja Laukemper	2016-2017	1	0	0	0	0	0	0	0	0	0	1	0
MF	(Germany)	Patricia Pape	2016-2018	35	12	0	0	31	6	31	6	0	0	4	6
FW	(Germany)	Sophia Thiemann	2016-2017	26	4	0	0	23	4	23	4	0	0	3	0
MF	(Germany)	Sabrina Gorks	2017	1	0	0	0	0	0	0	0	0	0	1	0
DF	(Germany)	Stefanie Agyeman	2017-2018	11	1	0	0	9	1	9	1	0	0	2	0
GK	(Germany)	Jacqueline Backs	2017-2018	0	0	0	0	0	0	0	0	0	0	0	0
DF	(Germany)	**Vanessa Beyer**	2017-	40	1	0	0	36	1	36	1	0	0	4	0
DF	(Germany)	**Jennifer Brinkert**	2017-	20	0	0	0	19	0	19	0	0	0	1	0
DF	(Germany)	Frauke Fleischer	2017-2018	18	1	0	0	17	1	17	1	1	0	0	0
MF	(Germany)	**Katharina Härle**	2017-	13	0	0	0	13	0	13	0	0	0	0	0
MF	(Germany)	Anja Kirsten	2017-2018	15	4	0	0	13	4	13	4	1	0	1	0
MF	(Germany)	Joeline Klaar	2017-2018	0	0	0	0	0	0	0	0	0	0	0	0
DF	(Germany)	Waitsa Metaxas	2017-2018	4	0	0	0	1	0	1	0	1	0	2	0
MF	(Germany)	Lena Niepieklo	2017-2018	0	0	0	0	0	0	0	0	0	0	0	0
MF	(Germany)	**Lynn Olgemann**	2017-	39	16	0	0	37	16	37	16	0	0	2	0
FW	(Germany)	Viola Pungel	2017-2018	0	0	0	0	0	0	0	0	0	0	0	0
MF	(Germany)	Nele Schmidt	2017-2018	2	0	0	0	2	0	2	0	0	0	0	0
MF	(Germany)	**Giulia Senking**	2017-	18	4	0	0	16	4	16	4	0	0	2	0
MF	(Germany)	Amy Haggart	2017-2018	5	0	0	0	5	0	5	0	0	0	0	0
GK	(Germany)	Verena Muckermann	2017-2018	0	0	0	0	0	0	0	0	0	0	0	0
GK	(Germany)	**Josephine Plehn**	2017-	15	0	0	0	14	0	14	0	0	0	1	0
GK	(Germany)	**Kristina Vrataric**	2017-	11	0	0	0	10	0	10	0	0	0	1	0
FW	(Germany)	**Maria Bienentreu**	2018-	6	0	0	0	6	0	6	0	0	0	0	0
FW	(Turkey)	**Gizem Kilic**	2018-	24	22	0	0	24	22	24	22	0	0	0	0
DF	(Germany)	**Lu Jele Michelsen**	2018-	8	0	0	0	6	0	6	0	0	0	2	0
DF	(Germany)	**Cansel Polat**	2018-	1	0	0	0	1	0	1	0	0	0	0	0
MF	(Germany)	**Valentina Vogt**	2018-	20	6	0	0	18	6	18	6	0	0	2	0
DF	(Germany)	**Angelina Becker**	2019-	2	0	0	0	2	0	2	0	0	0	0	0
MF	(Germany)	**Nina Breuer**	2019-	1	0	0	0	1	0	1	0	0	0	0	0
MF	(Germany)	**Joy Demirovski**	2019-	2	0	0	0	2	0	2	0	0	0	0	0
DF	(Germany)	**Ann-Kristin Frank**	2019-	5	1	0	0	5	1	5	1	0	0	0	0
GK	(Germany)	**Maria Grohs**	2019-	6	0	0	0	6	0	6	0	0	0	0	0
MF	(United States)	**Julia Cipriano**	2019-	6	0	0	0	6	0	6	0	0	0	0	0
DF	(Germany)	**Charlotte Heithoff**	2019-	2	0	0	0	2	0	2	0	0	0	0	0
