= Nathalie Götz =

German footballer

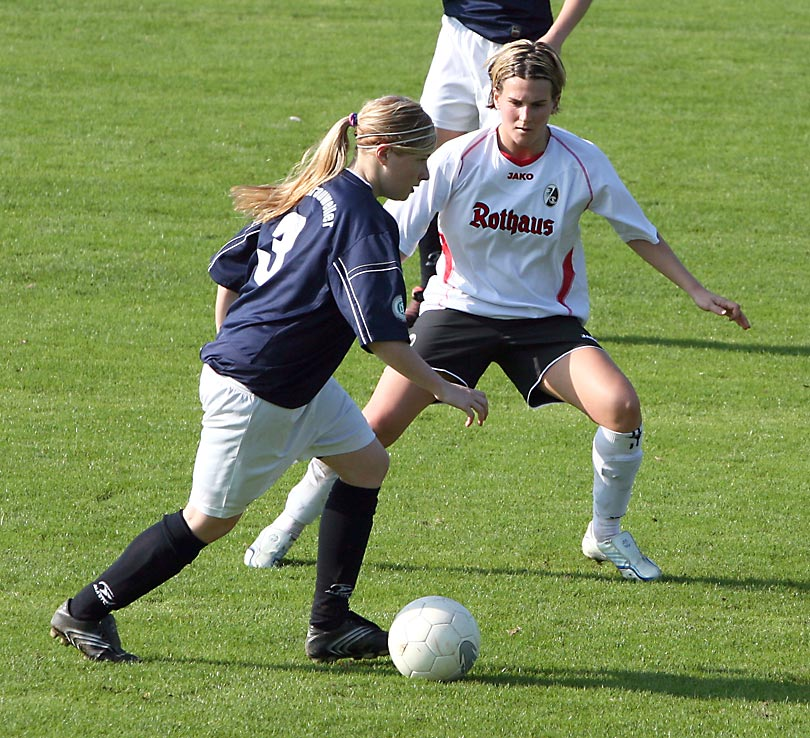
- Götz (left) playing for Brauweiler Pulheim (2006)

Personal information
- Full name: Nathalie Götz
- Date of birth: 7 November 1987 (age 38)
- Height: 1.70 m (5 ft 7 in)
- Position: Defender

Team information
- Current team: 1. FC Union Berlin

Youth career
- 1995–1998: HSV Langenfeld
- 1998–2002: Garather SV
- 2002–2004: FCR 2001 Duisburg

Senior career*
Years	Team	Apps	(Gls)
2004–2005	FCR 2001 Duisburg II		
2005–2006	Ratingen 04/19		
2006–2007	FFC Brauweiler Pulheim	22	(0)
2007–2008	SG Preußen Gladbeck		
2008–2010	TuS Harpen	51	(5)
2010–2015	VfL Bochum	115	(12)
2016–2018	BSC Marzahn	46	(8)
2018–	1. FC Union Berlin	17	(0)
- * Club domestic league appearances and goals as of 1 August 2019

Nathalie Götz (née Bock, born 7 November 1987) is a German football defender, who plays for Union Berlin. She started playing football for HSV Langenfeld at the age of eight. In 2002, she reached the final of the Lower Rhine Championship with Garather SV.

== Career ==
=== Statistics ===
As of 1 August 2019

Club	Season	League			Cup		Other		Total	
Club	Season	Division	Apps	Goals	Apps	Goals	Apps	Goals	Apps	Goals
FCR 2001 Duisburg II	2004–05	Regionalliga West			—		—			
FCR 2001 Duisburg II	Total				0	0	0	0		
Ratingen 04/19	2005–06	Regionalliga West			—		—			
Ratingen 04/19	Total				0	0	0	0		
FFC Brauweiler Pulheim	2006–07	Bundesliga	22	0			—			
FFC Brauweiler Pulheim	Total		22	0			0	0		
SG Preußen Gladbeck	2007–08	Kreisliga A			—		—			
SG Preußen Gladbeck	Total				0	0	0	0		
TuS Harpen	2008–09	Regionalliga West	26	1	—		—		26	1
TuS Harpen	2009–10	Regionalliga West	25	4	—		—		25	4
TuS Harpen	Total		51	5	0	0	0	0	51	5
VfL Bochum	2010–11	Regionalliga West	26	2	1	0	—		27	2
VfL Bochum	2011–12	Regionalliga West	13	0	0	0	—		13	0
VfL Bochum	2012–13	Regionalliga West	21	6	—		—		21	6
VfL Bochum	2013–14	2. Bundesliga	21	1	3	0	—		24	1
VfL Bochum	2014–15	2. Bundesliga	21	1	1	0	—		22	1
VfL Bochum	2015–16	Regionalliga West	13	2	1	0	—		14	2
VfL Bochum	Total		115	12	6	0	0	0	121	6
BSC Marzahn	2015–16	Regionalliga Nordost	7	1	—		—		7	1
BSC Marzahn	2016–17	Regionalliga Nordost	19	4	—		—		19	4
BSC Marzahn	2017–18	Regionalliga Nordost	20	3	0	0	—		20	3
BSC Marzahn	Total		46	8	0	0	0	0	46	8
1. FC Union Berlin	2017–18	Regionalliga Nordost	17	0	—		2 (Note: Appearances in the Regionalliga promotion play-offs)	0	19	0
1. FC Union Berlin	2019–20	Regionalliga Nordost	0	0	0	0	—		0	0
1. FC Union Berlin	Total		17	0	0	0	2	0	19	0
Career total							2	0		
