= Harry Griesbeck =

German footballer

Personal information
- Full name: Harry Griesbeck
- Date of birth: 22 August 1946 (age 80)
- Position: Forward

Senior career*
Years	Team	Apps	(Gls)
1966–1968	FC 08 Villingen	63	(13)
1968–1970	VfL Bochum	50	(9)
1970–1975	VfR Heilbronn	137	(44)
1975–1981	VfB Eppingen		
- FC Marbach
- FV Lauda

Managerial career
- 1987: SV Sandhausen
- 199?–1991: VfR Heilbronn
- * Club domestic league appearances and goals

Harry Griesbeck (born 22 August 1946) is a retired German football forward.
