= 2004–05 VfL Bochum season =

VfL Bochum
2004–05 season
- Chairman: Werner Altegoer
- Head Coach: Peter Neururer
- Stadium: Ruhrstadion
- Bundesliga: 16th (relegated)
- DFB-Pokal: Second Round
- DFB-Ligapokal: First Round
- UEFA Cup: First Round
- Top goalscorer: League: Lokvenc (10); All: Lokvenc (11)
- Highest home attendance: 32,645 (vs FC Bayern Munich, 14 November 2004; vs FC Schalke 04, 5 March 2005)
- Lowest home attendance: 20,113 (vs VfL Wolfsburg, 19 March 2005)
- Average home league attendance: 26,376
Home colours	Away colours	Third colours

The 2004–05 VfL Bochum season was the 67th season in club history.

== Matches ==
=== Legend ===
Win Draw Loss

=== Bundesliga ===
7 August 2004 1	Hertha BSC	2–2	VfL Bochum	Berlin
15:30	Gilberto 6'; Marcelinho 44'		Kalla 65'; Madsen 70' (pen.)	Stadium: Olympiastadion; Attendance: 45,435; Referee: Markus Merk (Otterbach)

15 August 2004 2	VfL Bochum	2–2	Bayer 04 Leverkusen	Bochum
17:30	Lokvenc 29'; Preuß 69'		Berbatov 66'; Voronin 87'	Stadium: Ruhrstadion; Attendance: 26,289; Referee: Lutz Michael Fröhlich (Berlin)

28 August 2004 3	Arminia Bielefeld	1–2	VfL Bochum	Bielefeld
15:30	Buckley 87'		Zdebel 31'; Diabang 90+3'	Stadium: Schüco-Arena; Attendance: 18,567; Referee: Helmut Fleischer (Ulm)

11 September 2004 4	VfL Bochum	2–2	Borussia Dortmund	Bochum
15:30	Kalla 15'; Demel 75' (o.g.)		Koller 48'; Ewerthon 59'	Stadium: Ruhrstadion; Attendance: 32,220; Referee: Herbert Fandel (Kyllburg)

19 September 2004 5	SC Freiburg	1–1	VfL Bochum	Freiburg
17:30	Schumann 58'		Bechmann 55'	Stadium: Badenova-Stadion; Attendance: 21,500; Referee: Florian Meyer (Burgdorf)

25 September 2004 6	VfL Bochum	1–4	SV Werder Bremen	Bochum
15:30	Knavs 68'		Borowski 54'; Klose 70', 88', 89'	Stadium: Ruhrstadion; Attendance: 25,110; Referee: Hermann Albrecht (Kaufbeuren)

3 October 2004 7	FC Schalke 04	3–2	VfL Bochum	Gelsenkirchen
17:30	Asamoah 10'; Kobiashvili 13'; Lincoln 44'		Misimović 49'; Kalla 65'	Stadium: Arena AufSchalke; Attendance: 61,524; Referee: Wolfgang Stark (Ergolding)

16 October 2004 8	VfL Bochum	0–1	FC Hansa Rostock	Bochum
15:30			Prica 74'	Stadium: Ruhrstadion; Attendance: 24,902; Referee: Markus Schmidt (Stuttgart)

23 October 2004 9	VfL Wolfsburg	3–0	VfL Bochum	Wolfsburg
15:30	Thiam 27'; Klimowicz 39'; D'Alessandro 42'			Stadium: Volkswagen-Arena; Attendance: 20,187; Referee: Jörg Keßler (Höhenkirchen)

26 October 2004 10	VfL Bochum	3–0	Borussia Mönchengladbach	Bochum
20:00	Preuß 54'; Wosz 85'; Madsen 90'			Stadium: Ruhrstadion; Attendance: 30,975; Referee: Michael Weiner (Giesen)

30 October 2004 11	Hannover 96	3–0	VfL Bochum	Hannover
15:30	Christiansen 17'; Stendel 65'; Leandro 88'			Stadium: AWD-Arena; Attendance: 28,114; Referee: Lutz Wagner (Kriftel)

6 November 2004 12	VfL Bochum	1–1	1. FC Kaiserslautern	Bochum
15:30	Lokvenc 62'		Lembi 26'	Stadium: Ruhrstadion; Attendance: 22,977; Referee: Herbert Fandel (Kyllburg)

14 November 2004 13	VfL Bochum	1–3	FC Bayern Munich	Bochum
17:30	Lokvenc 66'		Guerrero 76', 81'; Preuß 82' (o.g.)	Stadium: Ruhrstadion; Attendance: 32,645; Referee: Manuel Gräfe (Berlin)

20 November 2004 14	1. FSV Mainz 05	1–0	VfL Bochum	Mainz
15:30	da Silva 19'			Stadium: Bruchwegstadion; Attendance: 20,300; Referee: Franz-Xaver Wack (Biberbach)

27 November 2004 15	VfL Bochum	3–1	1. FC Nürnberg	Bochum
15:30	Lokvenc 22', 50'; Kalla 42'		Mintál 65'	Stadium: Ruhrstadion; Attendance: 20,356; Referee: Stefan Trautmann (Bodenwerder)

4 December 2004 16	VfB Stuttgart	5–2	VfL Bochum	Stuttgart
15:30	Kalla 5' (o.g.); Kurányi 23', 81'; Hleb 69'; Meißner 75'		Edu 33'; Maltritz 59'	Stadium: Gottlieb-Daimler-Stadion; Attendance: 35,000; Referee: Jörg Keßler (Höhenkirchen)

11 December 2004 17	VfL Bochum	1–2	Hamburger SV	Bochum
15:30	Bechmann 83'		Barbarez 26'; Benjamin 34'	Stadium: Ruhrstadion; Attendance: 25,990; Referee: Knut Kircher (Rottenburg)

23 January 2005 18	VfL Bochum	2–2	Hertha BSC	Bochum
17:30	Madsen 39' (pen.); Lokvenc 79'		Rafael 3'; Gilberto 16'	Stadium: Ruhrstadion; Attendance: 23,262; Referee: Helmut Fleischer (Ulm)

29 January 2005 19	Bayer 04 Leverkusen	4–0	VfL Bochum	Leverkusen
15:30	Krzynówek 28'; Voronin 31'; Ponte 70'; Freier 78'			Stadium: BayArena; Attendance: 22,500; Referee: Uwe Kemmling (Kleinburgwedel)

5 February 2005 20	VfL Bochum	1–1	Arminia Bielefeld	Bochum
15:30	Madsen 19' (pen.)		Buckley 29'	Stadium: Ruhrstadion; Attendance: 22,233; Referee: Stefan Trautmann (Bodenwerder)

12 February 2005 21	Borussia Dortmund	1–0	VfL Bochum	Dortmund
15:30	Koller 21'			Stadium: Westfalenstadion; Attendance: 75,500; Referee: Hermann Albrecht (Kaufbeuren)

19 February 2005 22	VfL Bochum	3–1	SC Freiburg	Bochum
15:30	Misimović 35' (pen.); Kalla 56'; Bechmann 84'		Aogo 80'	Stadium: Ruhrstadion; Attendance: 22,820; Referee: Knut Kircher (Rottenburg)

26 February 2005 23	SV Werder Bremen	4–0	VfL Bochum	Bremen
15:30	Ismaël 45'; Baumann 49'; Valdez 53'; Micoud 73'			Stadium: Weserstadion; Attendance: 37,492; Referee: Markus Merk (Otterbach)

5 March 2005 24	VfL Bochum	0–2	FC Schalke 04	Bochum
15:30			Aílton 30'; Lincoln 77'	Stadium: Ruhrstadion; Attendance: 32,645; Referee: Florian Meyer (Burgdorf)

12 March 2005 25	FC Hansa Rostock	3–1	VfL Bochum	Rostock
15:30	Di Salvo 36', 49'; Prica 52'		Edu 70'	Stadium: Ostseestadion; Attendance: 18,600; Referee: Lutz Michael Fröhlich (Berlin)

19 March 2005 26	VfL Bochum	5–1	VfL Wolfsburg	Bochum
15:30	Edu 15', 38'; Wosz 24'; Lokvenc 40'; Madsen 58'		Petrov 73'	Stadium: Ruhrstadion; Attendance: 20,113; Referee: Manuel Gräfe (Berlin)

3 April 2005 27	Borussia Mönchengladbach	2–2	VfL Bochum	Mönchengladbach
17:30	Kluge 30'; Jansen 52'		Lokvenc 70'; Pletsch 90' (o.g.)	Stadium: Borussia-Park; Attendance: 49,451; Referee: Michael Weiner (Giesen)

9 April 2005 28	VfL Bochum	1–0	Hannover 96	Bochum
15:30	Maltritz 57'			Stadium: Ruhrstadion; Attendance: 23,821; Referee: Franz-Xaver Wack (Biberbach)

17 April 2005 29	1. FC Kaiserslautern	1–2	VfL Bochum	Kaiserslautern
17:30	Blank 61' (pen.)		Maltritz 39'; Diabang 74'	Stadium: Fritz-Walter-Stadion; Attendance: 33,512; Referee: Florian Meyer (Burgdorf)

23 April 2005 30	FC Bayern Munich	3–1	VfL Bochum	Munich
15:30	Pizarro 9'; Ballack 26'; Makaay 63'		Tapalović 51'	Stadium: Olympiastadion; Attendance: 63,000; Referee: Knut Kircher (Rottenburg)

30 April 2005 31	VfL Bochum	2–6	1. FSV Mainz 05	Bochum
15:30	Lokvenc 27'; Bechmann 87'		Auer 6'; Thurk 60'; Gerber 65' da Silva 68'; Weigelt 78'; Casey 84'	Stadium: Ruhrstadion; Attendance: 31,056; Referee: Lutz Michael Fröhlich (Berlin)

7 May 2005 32	1. FC Nürnberg	2–1	VfL Bochum	Nuremberg
15:30	Daun 21'; Mintál 85'		Meichelbeck 90+2'	Stadium: Frankenstadion; Attendance: 44,650; Referee: Markus Merk (Otterbach)

14 May 2005 33	VfL Bochum	2–0	VfB Stuttgart	Bochum
15:30	Misimović 60'; Lokvenc 71'			Stadium: Ruhrstadion; Attendance: 30,980; Referee: Michael Weiner (Giesen)

21 May 2005 34	Hamburger SV	0–1	VfL Bochum	Hamburg
15:30			Diabang 3'	Stadium: AOL Arena; Attendance: 54,178; Referee: Markus Schmidt (Stuttgart)

=== DFB-Pokal ===
21 August 2004 R1	Fortuna Düsseldorf	1–3	VfL Bochum	Düsseldorf
15:00	Podszus 10'		Madsen 28', 32' (pen.); Lokvenc 58'	Stadium: Paul-Janes-Stadion; Attendance: 8,500; Referee: Stefan Trautmann (Bodenwerder)

21 September 2004 R2	SC Freiburg	3–2 (a.e.t.)	VfL Bochum	Freiburg
19:00	Riether 40'; Dorn 90', 116'		Bechmann 24'; Misimović 53' (pen.)	Stadium: Badenova-Stadion; Attendance: 7,500; Referee: Franz-Xaver Wack (Biberbach)

=== DFB-Ligapokal ===
22 July 2004 R1	VfB Stuttgart	3–0	VfL Bochum	Aalen
18:00	Cacau 5', 34'; Szabics 85'			Stadium: Scholz-Arena; Attendance: 11,198; Referee: Peter Gagelmann (Bremen)

=== UEFA Cup ===
16 September 2004 R1 1st leg	Standard Liège (Belgium)	0–0	VfL Bochum	Liège
20:30				Stadium: Stade Maurice Dufrasne; Attendance: 12,000; Referee: Claude Colombo (France)

30 September 2004 R1 2nd leg	VfL Bochum	1–1 (1–1 agg.)	(Belgium) Standard Liège	Bochum
20:30	Maltritz 45'		Curbelo 90+2'	Stadium: Ruhrstadion; Attendance: 23,356; Referee: Georgios Kasnaferis (Greece)

Standard Liège won on away goals.

== Squad ==
=== Squad and statistics ===
==== Squad, appearances and goals scored ====
No.	Pos	Nat	Player	Total		Bundesliga		DFB-Pokal		DFB-Pokal		UEFA Cup	
No.	Pos	Nat	Player	Apps	Goals	Apps	Goals	Apps	Goals	Apps	Goals	Apps	Goals
1	GK	(Netherlands) NED	Rein van Duijnhoven	28	0	24	0	1	0	1	0	2	0
2	DF	(Germany) GER	Michael Bemben	8	0	1+5	0	0+1	0	1	0	0	0
3	DF	(Germany) GER	Martin Meichelbeck	25	1	16+6	1	0+1	0	0	0	0+2	0
4	DF	(Germany) GER	Marcel Maltritz	32	3	26+1	2	2	0	0+1	0	2	1
5	DF	(Denmark) DEN	Søren Colding	35	0	31	0	2	0	0	0	2	0
6	DF	(Cameroon) CMR	Raymond Kalla	28	5	23	5	2	0	1	0	2	0
7	FW	(Denmark) DEN	Tommy Bechmann	31	5	13+14	4	2	1	0+1	0	1	0
8	MF	(Poland) POL	Tomasz Zdebel	32	1	26+2	1	1	0	1	0	2	0
9	FW	(Denmark) DEN	Peter Madsen	21	7	18+1	5	1	2	1	0	0	0
10	MF	(Germany) GER	Dariusz Wosz	33	2	26+3	2	1	0	1	0	2	0
11	FW	(Czech Republic) CZE	Vratislav Lokvenc	36	11	32	10	2	1	0	0	2	0
13	GK	(Germany) GER	Christian Vander	11	0	8+2	0	1	0	0	0	0	0
14	MF	(Iceland) ISL	Þórður Guðjónsson (until 31 December 2004)	3	0	0+3	0	0	0	0	0	0	0
15	DF	(Slovenia) SVN	Aleksander Knavs	31	1	26	1	2	0	1	0	2	0
16	MF	(Bosnia and Herzegovina) BIH	Zvjezdan Misimović	36	4	17+14	3	1+1	1	0+1	0	0+2	0
17	MF	(Germany) GER	Christoph Preuß	34	2	23+7	2	1	0	1	0	2	0
18	MF	(Croatia) CRO	Filip Tapalović	12	1	5+7	1	0	0	0	0	0	0
19	FW	(Senegal) SEN	Mamadou Diabang	13	3	3+8	3	0	0	1	0	1	0
20	MF	(Serbia and Montenegro) SCG	Miroslav Stević	0	0	0	0	0	0	0	0	0	0
21	MF	(Czech Republic) CZE	Filip Trojan	23	0	14+5	0	1+1	0	1	0	0+1	0
22	DF	(Brazil) BRA	Edu	20	4	11+6	4	0+2	0	0	0	0+1	0
23	FW	(Germany) GER	Ersan Tekkan	0	0	0	0	0	0	0	0	0	0
24	DF	(Germany) GER	Philipp Bönig	34	0	28+1	0	2	0	1	0	2	0
25	DF	(Germany) GER	Marvin Matip	1	0	1	0	0	0	0	0	0	0
28	MF	(Iran) IRN	Moharram Navidkia	0	0	0	0	0	0	0	0	0	0
29	FW	(Italy) ITA	Gaetano Manno	2	0	0+2	0	0	0	0	0	0	0
30	FW	(Italy) ITA	Luciano Velardi	0	0	0	0	0	0	0	0	0	0
32	MF	(Germany) GER	Dennis Grote	5	0	0+5	0	0	0	0	0	0	0
33	GK	(Turkey) TUR	Polat Keser	0	0	0	0	0	0	0	0	0	0
34	DF	(Turkey) TUR	Fatih Akyel (from 14 December 2004 until 31 March 2005)	1	0	0+1	0	0	0	0	0	0	0
35	GK	(Denmark) DEN	Peter Skov-Jensen (since 11 January 2005)	2	0	2	0	0	0	0	0	0	0
36	MF	(Germany) GER	Claus Costa	0	0	0	0	0	0	0	0	0	0
37	FW	(Germany) GER	Alexander Thamm	1	0	0+1	0	0	0	0	0	0	0

Last updated: 31 June 2005
Source: Matches

=== Transfers ===
==== Summer ====
In:

No.	Pos.	Nation	Player
4	DF	GER	Marcel Maltritz (from Hamburger SV)
7	FW	DEN	Tommy Bechmann (from Esbjerg fB)
11	FW	CZE	Vratislav Lokvenc (from 1. FC Kaiserslautern)
15	DF	SVN	Aleksander Knavs (from 1. FC Kaiserslautern)
16	MF	BIH	Zvjezdan Misimović (from FC Bayern Munich)
17	MF	GER	Christoph Preuß (from Eintracht Frankfurt)
21	MF	CZE	Filip Trojan (from FC Schalke 04)
25	DF	GER	Marvin Matip (from VfL Bochum U-19)
28	MF	IRN	Moharram Navidkia (from Sepahan F.C.)
29	FW	ITA	Gaetano Manno (from VfL Bochum II)
32	MF	GER	Dennis Grote (from VfL Bochum II)
33	GK	TUR	Polat Keser (from VfL Bochum II)

Out:

No.	Pos.	Nation	Player
7	MF	GER	Paul Freier (to Bayer 04 Leverkusen)
12	DF	NED	Anton Vriesde (to Helmond Sport)
15	DF	GER	Frank Fahrenhorst (to SV Werder Bremen)
16	FW	IRN	Vahid Hashemian (to FC Bayern Munich)
21	MF	RSA	Delron Buckley (to Arminia Bielefeld)
23	MF	ESP	Cristian Fiél (to Alemannia Aachen)
31	GK	CRO	Toni Tapalović (to KFC Uerdingen 05)

==== Winter ====
In:

No.	Pos.	Nation	Player
34	DF	TUR	Fatih Akyel (free agent)
35	GK	DEN	Peter Skov-Jensen (from FC Midtjylland)

Out:

No.	Pos.	Nation	Player
14	MF	ISL	Þórður Guðjónsson (to Stoke City F.C.)
34	DF	TUR	Fatih Akyel (released)

== VfL Bochum II ==
No.	Pos	Nat	Player	Total		Oberliga Westfalen	
No.	Pos	Nat	Player	Apps	Goals	Apps	Goals
	DF	(Germany) GER	Michael Bemben	1	0	1	0
	MF	(Germany) GER	Claus Costa	31	7	31	7
	DF	(Germany) GER	David Czyszczon	33	4	33	4
	DF	(Germany) GER	Thomas Falkowski	17	0	17	0
	DF	(Germany) GER	Daniel Gordon	33	5	33	5
	GK	(Germany) GER	Bastian Görrissen	15	0	15	0
	DF	(Germany) GER	Björn Grallert	4	0	4	0
	MF	(Germany) GER	Dennis Grote	4	0	4	0
	MF	(Germany) GER	Sebastian Hille	32	7	32	7
	MF	(Germany) GER	Sascha Höhle	15	1	15	1
	GK	(Turkey) TUR	Polat Keser	17	0	17	0
	FW	(Italy) ITA	Gaetano Manno	28	9	28	9
	DF	(Germany) GER	Lars Marten	1	0	1	0
	DF	(Germany) GER	Marvin Matip	32	3	32	3
	DF	(Germany) GER	Mirko Mustroph	24	2	24	2
	DF	(Germany) GER	Marc-Andre Nimptsch	4	0	4	0
	FW	(Germany) GER	Martin Setzke	27	2	27	2
	DF	(Germany) GER	Mirko Talaga	1	0	1	0
	FW	(Germany) GER	Ersan Tekkan	11	1	11	1
	FW	(Germany) GER	Alexander Thamm	33	12	33	12
	FW	(Turkey) TUR	Suri Ucar	30	5	30	5
	GK	(Germany) GER	Christian Vander	4	0	4	0
	FW	(Italy) ITA	Luciano Velardi	34	17	34	17
	MF	(Germany) GER	Sebastian Westerhoff	13	2	13	2
	MF	(Germany) GER	David Zajas	31	0	31	0
