= 2003–04 VfL Bochum season =

VfL Bochum
2003–04 season
- Chairman: Werner Altegoer
- Head Coach: Peter Neururer
- Stadium: Ruhrstadion
- Bundesliga: 5th
- DFB-Pokal: First Round
- DFB-Ligapokal: First Round
- Top goalscorer: League: Hashemian (16); All: Hashemian (18)
- Highest home attendance: 32,645 (vs Borussia Dortmund, 26 October 2003; vs FC Bayern Munich, 14 February 2004; vs Borussia Mönchengladbach, 14 March 2004; vs FC Schalke 04, 27 March 2004; vs SV Werder Bremen, 25 April 2004; vs Hannover 96, 22 May 2004)
- Lowest home attendance: 20,120 (vs 1. FC Kaiserslautern, 4 October 2003)
- Average home league attendance: 27,188
Home colours	Away colours	Third colours

The 2003–04 VfL Bochum season was the 66th season in club history.

== Matches ==
=== Legend ===
Win Draw Loss

=== Bundesliga ===
2 August 2003 1	VfL Wolfsburg	3 – 2	VfL Bochum	Wolfsburg
15:30	Thiam 9'; Klimowicz 14'; Petrov 75'		Madsen 37'; Fahrenhorst 44'	Stadium: Volkswagen Arena; Attendance: 15,976; Referee: Wolfgang Stark (Ergolding)

9 August 2003 2	VfL Bochum	1 – 1	Hamburger SV	Bochum
15:30	Madsen 30'		Takahara 19'	Stadium: Ruhrstadion; Attendance: 20,400; Referee: Lutz Wagner (Kriftel)

16 August 2003 3	FC Bayern Munich	2 – 0	VfL Bochum	Munich
15:30	Pizarro 20'; Deisler 26'			Stadium: Olympiastadion; Attendance: 63,000; Referee: Peter Gagelmann (Bremen)

23 August 2003 4	VfL Bochum	1 – 0	Bayer 04 Leverkusen	Bochum
15:30	Zdebel 65'			Stadium: Ruhrstadion; Attendance: 21,003; Referee: Uwe Kemmling (Kleinburgwedel)

13 September 2003 5	FC Hansa Rostock	0 – 2	VfL Bochum	Rostock
15:30			Hashemian 47'; B. Guðjónsson 90+2'	Stadium: Ostseestadion; Attendance: 18,000; Referee: Markus Merk (Otterbach)

20 September 2003 6	VfL Bochum	2 – 2	Hertha BSC	Bochum
15:30	Zdebel 44'; Hashemian 73'		Neuendorf 8', 66'	Stadium: Ruhrstadion; Attendance: 22,000; Referee: Peter Sippel (Munich)

27 September 2003 7	Borussia Mönchengladbach	2 – 2	VfL Bochum	Mönchengladbach
15:30	van Lent 5' (pen.), 90+3'		Diabang 60'; Madsen 89'	Stadium: Bökelbergstadion; Attendance: 29,000; Referee: Torsten Koop (Lüttenmark)

4 October 2003 8	VfL Bochum	4 – 0	1. FC Kaiserslautern	Bochum
15:30	Hashemian 49', 83'; Madsen 60', 90'			Stadium: Ruhrstadion; Attendance: 20,120; Referee: Wolfgang Stark (Ergolding)

19 October 2003 9	FC Schalke 04	0 – 2	VfL Bochum	Gelsenkirchen
17:30			Fahrenhorst 65'; Diabang 78'	Stadium: Arena AufSchalke; Attendance: 61,178; Referee: Lutz Wagner (Kriftel)

26 October 2003 10	VfL Bochum	3 – 0	Borussia Dortmund	Bochum
17:30	Hashemian 7', 57'; Oliseh 79'			Stadium: Ruhrstadion; Attendance: 32,645; Referee: Lutz Michael Fröhlich (Berlin)

1 November 2003 11	TSV 1860 Munich	3 – 1	VfL Bochum	Munich
15:30	Lauth 49', 66' (pen.), 77'		Hashemian 35'	Stadium: Olympiastadion; Attendance: 18,000; Referee: Stefan Trautmann (Bodenwerder)

8 November 2003 12	VfL Bochum	4 – 0	1. FC Köln	Bochum
15:30	Hashemian 7'; Madsen 15'; Kalla 45+1'; Stević 87'			Stadium: Ruhrstadion; Attendance: 30,777; Referee: Florian Meyer (Burgdorf)

22 November 2003 13	SV Werder Bremen	3 – 1	VfL Bochum	Bremen
15:30	Aílton 6', 15', 50' (pen.)		Fahrenhorst 75'	Stadium: Weserstadion; Attendance: 34,298; Referee: Markus Merk (Otterbach)

29 November 2003 14	VfL Bochum	0 – 0	VfB Stuttgart	Bochum
15:30				Stadium: Ruhrstadion; Attendance: 30,088; Referee: Edgar Steinborn (Sinzig)

6 December 2003 15	SC Freiburg	4 – 2	VfL Bochum	Freiburg
15:30	Antar 3', 11', 79'; Sanou 23'		Hashemian 13'; Madsen 24'	Stadium: Dreisamstadion; Attendance: 23,000; Referee: Herbert Fandel (Kyllburg)

13 December 2003 16	VfL Bochum	1 – 0	Eintracht Frankfurt	Bochum
15:30	Hashemian 21'			Stadium: Ruhrstadion; Attendance: 23,129; Referee: Michael Weiner (Giesen)

17 December 2003 17	Hannover 96	2 – 2	VfL Bochum	Hannover
20:00	Brdarić 18' de Guzman 61'		Madsen 53'; Hashemian 75'	Stadium: AWD-Arena; Attendance: 20,396; Referee: Knut Kircher (Rottenburg)

31 January 2004 18	VfL Bochum	1 – 0	VfL Wolfsburg	Bochum
15:30	Fahrenhorst 35'			Stadium: Ruhrstadion; Attendance: 20,793; Referee: Peter Sippel (Munich)

7 February 2004 19	Hamburger SV	1 – 1	VfL Bochum	Hamburg
15:30	Romeo 82'		Colding 69'	Stadium: AOL Arena; Attendance: 37,667; Referee: Markus Schmidt (Stuttgart)

14 February 2004 20	VfL Bochum	1 – 0	FC Bayern Munich	Bochum
15:30	Madsen 8'			Stadium: Ruhrstadion; Attendance: 32,645; Referee: Lutz Wagner (Kriftel)

21 February 2004 21	Bayer 04 Leverkusen	1 – 3	VfL Bochum	Leverkusen
15:30	Berbatov 60'		Meichelbeck 52'; Wosz 54'; Diabang 73'	Stadium: BayArena; Attendance: 22,500; Referee: Hermann Albrecht (Kaufbeuren)

28 February 2004 22	VfL Bochum	0 – 0	FC Hansa Rostock	Bochum
15:30				Stadium: Ruhrstadion; Attendance: 25,110; Referee: Michael Weiner (Giesen)

6 March 2004 23	Hertha BSC	1 – 1	VfL Bochum	Berlin
15:30	Marcelinho 20'		Fahrenhorst 57'	Stadium: Olympiastadion; Attendance: 31,600; Referee: Stefan Trautmann (Bodenwerder)

14 March 2004 24	VfL Bochum	1 – 0	Borussia Mönchengladbach	Bochum
17:30	Ašanin 88' (o.g.)			Stadium: Ruhrstadion; Attendance: 32,645; Referee: Florian Meyer (Burgdorf)

20 March 2004 25	1. FC Kaiserslautern	2 – 2	VfL Bochum	Kaiserslautern
15:30	Lokvenc 55', 64'		Hashemian 16'; Wosz 44'	Stadium: Fritz-Walter-Stadion; Attendance: 33,048; Referee: Peter Sippel (Munich)

27 March 2004 26	VfL Bochum	1 – 2	FC Schalke 04	Bochum
15:30	Meichelbeck 24'		Kläsener 77'; Delura 82'	Stadium: Ruhrstadion; Attendance: 32,645; Referee: Knut Kircher (Rottenburg)

4 April 2004 27	Borussia Dortmund	4 – 1	VfL Bochum	Dortmund
17:30	Koller 9'; Gambino 30'; Frings 45'; Ewerthon 53' (pen.)		Madsen 13'	Stadium: Westfalenstadion; Attendance: 81,000; Referee: Herbert Fandel (Kyllburg)

10 April 2004 28	VfL Bochum	4 – 0	TSV 1860 Munich	Bochum
15:30	Hashemian 26', 40'; Madsen 61'; Diabang 81'			Stadium: Ruhrstadion; Attendance: 23,430; Referee: Torsten Koop (Lüttenmark)

18 April 2004 29	1. FC Köln	1 – 2	VfL Bochum	Cologne
17:30	Podolski 54'		Wosz 30'; Fahrenhorst 64'	Stadium: Radrennbahn Müngersdorf; Attendance: 43,500; Referee: Franz-Xaver Wack (Biberbach)

25 April 2004 30	VfL Bochum	0 – 0	SV Werder Bremen	Bochum
17:30				Stadium: Ruhrstadion; Attendance: 32,645; Referee: Helmut Fleischer (Ulm)

2 May 2004 31	VfB Stuttgart	1 – 1	VfL Bochum	Stuttgart
17:30	Cacau 31'		Meichelbeck 58'	Stadium: Gottlieb-Daimler-Stadion; Attendance: 48,000; Referee: Markus Merk (Otterbach)

9 May 2004 32	VfL Bochum	3 – 0	SC Freiburg	Bochum
17:30	Madsen 2'; Hashemian 53'; Cairo 68' (o.g.)			Stadium: Ruhrstadion; Attendance: 29,474; Referee: Peter Sippel (Munich)

15 May 2004 33	Eintracht Frankfurt	3 – 2	VfL Bochum	Frankfurt am Main
15:30	Preuß 13'; Puljiz 19'; Amanatidis 51'		Hashemian 30'; Wosz 49'	Stadium: Waldstadion; Attendance: 31,300; Referee: Uwe Kemmling (Kleinburgwedel)

22 May 2004 34	VfL Bochum	3 – 1	Hannover 96	Bochum
15:30	Madsen 26'; Freier 76'; Fahrenhorst 88'		Christiansen 41'	Stadium: Ruhrstadion; Attendance: 32,645; Referee: Franz-Xaver Wack (Biberbach)

=== DFB-Pokal ===
30 August 2003 R1	SSV Jahn Regensburg	2 – 1	VfL Bochum	Regensburg
15:30	Tölcséres 19'; Knackmuß 76'		Hashemian 83'	Stadium: Jahnstadion; Attendance: 6,000; Referee: Volker Raquet (Rodenbach)

=== DFB-Ligapokal ===
16 July 2003 R1	Borussia Dortmund	2 – 1	VfL Bochum	Bochum
20:30	Rosický 30'; Amoroso 33'		Hashemian 38'	Stadium: Lohrheidestadion; Attendance: 11,002; Referee: Peter Sippel (Munich)

== Squad ==
=== Squad and statistics ===
==== Squad, appearances and goals scored ====
No.	Pos	Nat	Player	Total		Bundesliga		DFB-Pokal		DFB-Ligapokal	
No.	Pos	Nat	Player	Apps	Goals	Apps	Goals	Apps	Goals	Apps	Goals
1	GK	(Netherlands) NED	Rein van Duijnhoven	35	0	34	0	0	0	1	0
2	DF	(Germany) GER	Michael Bemben	11	0	10	0	1	0	0	0
3	DF	(Germany) GER	Martin Meichelbeck	12	3	12	3	0	0	0	0
4	MF	(Nigeria) NGA	Sunday Oliseh (until 31 March 2004)	22	1	21	1	0	0	1	0
5	DF	(Denmark) DEN	Søren Colding	35	1	33	1	1	0	1	0
6	DF	(Cameroon) CMR	Raymond Kalla	30	1	28	1	1	0	1	0
7	MF	(Germany) GER	Paul Freier	29	1	27	1	1	0	1	0
8	MF	(Poland) POL	Tomasz Zdebel	36	2	34	2	1	0	1	0
9	FW	(Denmark) DEN	Peter Madsen	33	13	32	13	1	0	0	0
10	MF	(Germany) GER	Dariusz Wosz	34	4	33	4	0	0	1	0
12	DF	(Netherlands) NED	Anton Vriesde	10	0	10	0	0	0	0	0
13	GK	(Germany) GER	Christian Vander	1	0	0	0	1	0	0	0
14	MF	(Iceland) ISL	Þórður Guðjónsson	13	0	12	0	1	0	0	0
15	DF	(Germany) GER	Frank Fahrenhorst	35	7	33	7	1	0	1	0
16	FW	(Iran) IRN	Vahid Hashemian	34	18	32	16	1	1	1	1
17	MF	(Iceland) ISL	Bjarni Guðjónsson (until 15 January 2004)	6	1	4	1	1	0	1	0
18	MF	(Croatia) CRO	Filip Tapalović	13	0	12	0	0	0	1	0
19	FW	(Senegal) SEN	Mamadou Diabang	26	4	24	4	1	0	1	0
20	MF	(Serbia and Montenegro) SCG	Miroslav Stević (since 1 September 2003)	21	1	21	1	0	0	0	0
21	FW	(South Africa) RSA	Delron Buckley	22	0	20	0	1	0	1	0
22	DF	(Brazil) BRA	Edu (since 30 August 2003)	13	0	13	0	0	0	0	0
23	MF	(Spain) ESP	Cristian Fiél	0	0	0	0	0	0	0	0
24	DF	(Germany) GER	Philipp Bönig	30	0	28	0	1	0	1	0
25	MF	(Germany) GER	Sascha Höhle	0	0	0	0	0	0	0	0
28	FW	(Italy) ITA	Luciano Velardi	0	0	0	0	0	0	0	0
29	FW	(Germany) GER	Alexander Thamm	0	0	0	0	0	0	0	0
31	GK	(Croatia) CRO	Toni Tapalović	0	0	0	0	0	0	0	0
32	MF	(Germany) GER	Ersan Tekkan	0	0	0	0	0	0	0	0
33	GK	(Germany) GER	Bastian Görrissen	0	0	0	0	0	0	0	0

=== Transfers ===
==== Summer ====
In:

No.	Pos.	Nation	Player
8	MF	POL	Tomasz Zdebel (from Gençlerbirliği S.K.)
9	FW	DEN	Peter Madsen (from Brøndby IF, previously on loan at VfL Wolfsburg)
17	MF	ISL	Bjarni Guðjónsson (from Stoke City F.C.)
19	FW	SEN	Mamadou Diabang (from Arminia Bielefeld)
20	MF	SCG	Miroslav Stević (from Fenerbahçe S.K.)
22	DF	BRA	Edu (from Clube Recreativo e Atlético Catalano)
24	DF	GER	Philipp Bönig (from MSV Duisburg)
32	MF	GER	Ersan Tekkan (from VfL Bochum U-19)
33	GK	GER	Bastian Görrissen (from VfL Bochum II)

Out:

No.	Pos.	Nation	Player
8	MF	GER	Sebastian Schindzielorz (to 1. FC Köln)
9	FW	ESP	Thomas Christiansen (to Hannover 96)
17	MF	GER	Björn Joppe (to 1. FC Union Berlin)
20	FW	RUS	Sergei Mandreko (to SV Mattersburg)
22	DF	GER	Thomas Reis (to FC Augsburg)

==== Winter ====
In:

No.	Pos.	Nation	Player

Out:

No.	Pos.	Nation	Player
4	MF	NGA	Sunday Oliseh (loan return to Borussia Dortmund)
17	MF	ISL	Bjarni Guðjónsson (on loan to Coventry City F.C.)

== VfL Bochum II ==
No.	Pos	Nat	Player	Total		Oberliga Westfalen	
No.	Pos	Nat	Player	Apps	Goals	Apps	Goals
	MF	(Germany) GER	Christian Baron	17	1	17	1
	MF	(Germany) GER	Claus Costa	16	2	16	2
	DF	(Germany) GER	David Czyszczon	29	1	29	1
	DF	(Germany) GER	Dirk Dobersek	1	0	1	0
	DF	(Germany) GER	Thomas Falkowski	26	0	26	0
	MF	(Spain) ESP	Cristian Fiél	5	2	5	2
	FW	(Germany) GER	Marcus Fischer	15	5	15	5
	GK	(Germany) GER	Bastian Görrissen	16	0	16	0
	DF	(Germany) GER	Björn Grallert	18	3	18	3
	MF	(Germany) GER	Dennis Grote	2	0	2	0
	MF	(Iceland) ISL	Bjarni Guðjónsson (until 15 January 2004)	1	0	1	0
	MF	(Germany) GER	Sascha Höhle	31	0	31	0
	FW	(Italy) ITA	Gaetano Manno	31	11	31	11
	DF	(Germany) GER	Lars Marten	13	0	13	0
	DF	(Germany) GER	Marvin Matip	1	0	1	0
	DF	(Germany) GER	Martin Meichelbeck	3	0	3	0
	DF	(Germany) GER	Mirko Mustroph	30	1	30	1
	FW	(Germany) GER	Gökhan Özdemir	16	4	16	4
	GK	(Germany) GER	Andreas Roch	3	0	3	0
	FW	(Germany) GER	Samir Tahri	14	0	14	0
	GK	(Croatia) CRO	Toni Tapalović	11	0	11	0
	MF	(Croatia) CRO	Filip Tapalović	2	0	2	0
	FW	(Germany) GER	Alexander Thamm	32	9	32	9
	MF	(Germany) GER	Stefan Tingler	7	0	7	0
	GK	(Germany) GER	Christian Vander	4	0	4	0
	FW	(Italy) ITA	Luciano Velardi	32	17	32	17
	DF	(Netherlands) NED	Anton Vriesde	8	1	8	1
	MF	(Germany) GER	Danny Woidtke	32	5	32	5
	MF	(Turkey) TUR	Engin Yavuzaslan	27	1	27	1
	MF	(Germany) GER	David Zajas	29	0	29	0
