= 2002–03 VfL Bochum season =

VfL Bochum
2002–03 season
- President/Chairman: Werner Altegoer
- Head Coach: Peter Neururer
- Stadium: Ruhrstadion
- Bundesliga: 9th
- DFB-Pokal: Quarter-finals
- Top goalscorer: League: Christiansen (21); All: Christiansen (23)
- Highest home attendance: 32,645 (vs Borussia Dortmund, 10 September 2002; vs FC Schalke 04, 17 November 2002; vs FC Bayern Munich, 15 March 2003; vs Borussia Mönchengladbach, 3 May 2003; vs Hamburger SV, 17 May 2003)
- Lowest home attendance: 18,229 (vs TSV 1860 Munich, 14 December 2002)
- Average home league attendance: 25,015
Home colours	Away colours	Third colours

The 2002–03 VfL Bochum season was the 65th season in club history.

== Matches ==
=== Legend ===
Win Draw Loss

=== Bundesliga ===
10 August 2002 1	1. FC Nürnberg	1 – 3	VfL Bochum	Nuremberg
15:30	Ćirić 51'		Christiansen 6', 20'; Hashemian 83'	Stadium: Frankenstadion; Attendance: 31,000; Referee: Michael Weiner (Giesen)

17 August 2002 2	VfL Bochum	5 – 0	FC Energie Cottbus	Bochum
15:30	Christiansen 26', 35', 84'; Freier 33'; Hashemian 64'			Stadium: Ruhrstadion; Attendance: 22,201; Referee: Uwe Kemmling (Kleinburgwedel)

24 August 2002 3	Bayer 04 Leverkusen	2 – 4	VfL Bochum	Leverkusen
15:30	Šimák 10'; França 75'		Guðjónsson 13'; Wosz 33'; Fahrenhorst 43'; Christiansen 60'	Stadium: BayArena; Attendance: 22,500; Referee: Hermann Albrecht (Kaufbeuren)

10 September 2002 4	VfL Bochum	0 – 0	Borussia Dortmund	Bochum
20:00				Stadium: Ruhrstadion; Attendance: 32,645; Referee: Edgar Steinborn (Sinzig)

15 September 2002 5	VfL Bochum	0 – 1	FC Hansa Rostock	Bochum
17:30			Salou 32'	Stadium: Ruhrstadion; Attendance: 25,000; Referee: Florian Meyer (Burgdorf)

21 September 2002 6	Hannover 96	2 – 2	VfL Bochum	Hannover
15:30	Bobic 44'; Linke 73'		Fahrenhorst 24'; F. Tapalović 89'	Stadium: AWD-Arena; Attendance: 34,742; Referee: Markus Merk (Otterbach)

29 September 2002 7	VfL Bochum	1 – 4	SV Werder Bremen	Bochum
17:30	Freier 22'		Aílton 16', 50'; Charisteas 37'; Krstajić 87'	Stadium: Ruhrstadion; Attendance: 26,171; Referee: Helmut Fleischer (Ulm)

5 October 2002 8	FC Bayern Munich	4 – 1	VfL Bochum	Munich
15:30	Élber 27', 90'; Pizarro 39', 66'		Schindzielorz 77'	Stadium: Olympiastadion; Attendance: 63,000; Referee: Herbert Fandel (Kyllburg)

20 October 2002 9	VfL Bochum	4 – 2	VfL Wolfsburg	Bochum
17:30	Christiansen 5'; Fahrenhorst 56'; Freier 57'; Hashemian 82'		Klimowicz 6'; Ponte 37'	Stadium: Ruhrstadion; Attendance: 18,858; Referee: Franz-Xaver Wack (Biberbach)

13 November 2002 10	1. FC Kaiserslautern	0 – 2	VfL Bochum	Kaiserslautern
18:30			Christiansen 7', 21'	Stadium: Fritz-Walter-Stadion; Attendance: 36,209; Referee: Jörg Keßler (Höhenkirchen)

3 November 2002 11	VfL Bochum	3 – 0	Hertha BSC	Bochum
17:30	Wosz 49'; Freier 80'; Guðjónsson 90+1'			Stadium: Ruhrstadion; Attendance: 22,009; Referee: Michael Weiner (Giesen)

9 November 2002 12	VfB Stuttgart	3 – 2	VfL Bochum	Stuttgart
15:30	Ganea 74', 86' (pen.), 90+1'		Christiansen 67'; Schindzielorz 84'	Stadium: Gottlieb-Daimler-Stadion; Attendance: 21,000; Referee: Florian Meyer (Burgdorf)

17 November 2002 13	VfL Bochum	0 – 2	FC Schalke 04	Bochum
17:30			Kalla 48' (o.g.); Asamoah 86'	Stadium: Ruhrstadion; Attendance: 32,645; Referee: Knut Kircher (Rottenburg)

23 November 2002 14	Borussia Mönchengladbach	2 – 2	VfL Bochum	Mönchengladbach
15:30	Demo 56'; Van Hout 59'		Hashemian 86'; Graulund 90+2'	Stadium: Bökelbergstadion; Attendance: 28,300; Referee: Helmut Fleischer (Ulm)

30 November 2002 15	VfL Bochum	0 – 3	Arminia Bielefeld	Bochum
15:30			Lense 3'; Vander 53' (o.g.); Diabang 87'	Stadium: Ruhrstadion; Attendance: 20,071; Referee: Hartmut Strampe (Handorf)

8 December 2002 16	Hamburger SV	1 – 1	VfL Bochum	Hamburg
17:30	Barbarez 56'		Graulund 90+1'	Stadium: AOL Arena; Attendance: 39,028; Referee: Hermann Albrecht (Kaufbeuren)

14 December 2002 17	VfL Bochum	1 – 1	TSV 1860 Munich	Bochum
15:30	Christiansen 76'		Lauth 14'	Stadium: Ruhrstadion; Attendance: 18,229; Referee: Herbert Fandel (Kyllburg)

25 January 2003 18	VfL Bochum	2 – 1	1. FC Nürnberg	Bochum
15:30	Christiansen 27'; Freier 33'		Cacau 24'	Stadium: Ruhrstadion; Attendance: 20,280; Referee: Lutz Wagner (Kriftel)

1 February 2003 19	FC Energie Cottbus	2 – 1	VfL Bochum	Cottbus
15:30	Reghecampf 2'; Juskowiak 82'		Guðjónsson 90+1'	Stadium: Stadion der Freundschaft; Attendance: 10,804; Referee: Peter Gagelmann (Bremen)

8 February 2003 20	VfL Bochum	2 – 1	Bayer 04 Leverkusen	Bochum
15:30	Hashemian 68', 84'		Babić 78'	Stadium: Ruhrstadion; Attendance: 20,643; Referee: Edgar Steinborn (Sinzig)

15 February 2003 21	Borussia Dortmund	4 – 1	VfL Bochum	Dortmund
15:30	Reina 33'; Koller 42'; Frings 45+2' (pen.), 67' (pen.)		Buckley 8'	Stadium: Westfalenstadion; Attendance: 66,000; Referee: Jürgen Aust (Cologne)

22 February 2003 22	FC Hansa Rostock	1 – 1	VfL Bochum	Rostock
15:30	Di Salvo 31'		Hashemian 61'	Stadium: Ostseestadion; Attendance: 14,800; Referee: Wolfgang Stark (Ergolding)

1 March 2003 23	VfL Bochum	1 – 2	Hannover 96	Bochum
15:30	Christiansen 62'		Vinícius 5'; Bobic 36'	Stadium: Ruhrstadion; Attendance: 20,248; Referee: Torsten Koop (Lüttenmark)

8 March 2003 24	SV Werder Bremen	2 – 0	VfL Bochum	Bremen
15:30	Aílton 52'; Banović 56'			Stadium: Weserstadion; Attendance: 29,600; Referee: Peter Sippel (Munich)

15 March 2003 25	VfL Bochum	1 – 4	FC Bayern Munich	Bochum
15:30	Christiansen 90'		Pizarro 19'; Élber 37'; N. Kovač 49'; Sagnol 87'	Stadium: Ruhrstadion; Attendance: 32,645; Referee: Markus Merk (Otterbach)

22 March 2003 26	VfL Wolfsburg	2 – 0	VfL Bochum	Wolfsburg
15:30	Marić 21'; Präger 31'			Stadium: Volkswagen Arena; Attendance: 20,973; Referee: Jörg Keßler (Höhenkirchen)

5 April 2003 27	VfL Bochum	1 – 1	1. FC Kaiserslautern	Bochum
15:30	Christiansen 81'		Ramzy 90+2'	Stadium: Ruhrstadion; Attendance: 23,146; Referee: Hermann Albrecht (Kaufbeuren)

12 April 2003 28	Hertha BSC	1 – 0	VfL Bochum	Berlin
15:30	Dárdai 63'			Stadium: Olympiastadion; Attendance: 37,022; Referee: Franz-Xaver Wack (Biberbach)

20 April 2003 29	VfL Bochum	3 – 1	VfB Stuttgart	Bochum
17:30	Hashemian 40', 66'; Christiansen 68'		Kurányi 25'	Stadium: Ruhrstadion; Attendance: 25,177; Referee: Wolfgang Stark (Ergolding)

26 April 2003 30	FC Schalke 04	1 – 2	VfL Bochum	Gelsenkirchen
15:30	Varela 28'		Christiansen 23'; Buckley 89'	Stadium: Arena AufSchalke; Attendance: 60,886; Referee: Lutz Michael Fröhlich (Berlin)

3 May 2003 31	VfL Bochum	1 – 1	Borussia Mönchengladbach	Bochum
15:30	Christiansen 20'		Forssell 19'	Stadium: Ruhrstadion; Attendance: 32,645; Referee: Lutz Wagner (Kriftel)

11 May 2003 32	Arminia Bielefeld	1 – 3	VfL Bochum	Bielefeld
17:30	Wichniarek 42'		Freier 23'; Christiansen 71' (pen.); Buckley 90+2'	Stadium: Alm; Attendance: 24,408; Referee: Jürgen Aust (Cologne)

17 May 2003 33	VfL Bochum	1 – 1	Hamburger SV	Bochum
15:30	Christiansen 31'		Rahn 82'	Stadium: Ruhrstadion; Attendance: 32,645; Referee: Torsten Koop (Lüttenmark)

24 May 2003 34	TSV 1860 Munich	2 – 4	VfL Bochum	Munich
15:30	Stranzl 37'; Max 78'		Freier 1'; Hashemian 64'; Christiansen 73'; Reis 89'	Stadium: Olympiastadion; Attendance: 25,000; Referee: Michael Weiner (Giesen)

=== DFB-Pokal ===
31 August 2002 R1	FC Erzgebirge Aue	1 – 3	VfL Bochum	Aue
15:30	Broum 3'		Buckley 24'; Freier 43'; Hashemian 60'	Stadium: Erzgebirgsstadion; Attendance: 6,500; Referee: Hartmut Strampe (Handorf)

6 November 2002 R2	Holstein Kiel	1 – 2	VfL Bochum	Kiel
19:00	Guščinas 32'		Wosz 29'; Freier 53'	Stadium: Holstein-Stadion; Attendance: 8,200; Referee: Torsten Koop (Lüttenmark)

3 December 2002 R3	Hamburger SV	0 – 1	VfL Bochum	Hamburg
19:30			Freier 35'	Stadium: AOL Arena; Attendance: 35,136; Referee: Peter Sippel (Munich)

5 February 2003 QF	VfL Bochum	3 – 3 (a.e.t.) (3 – 4 p)	1. FC Kaiserslautern	Bochum
19:00	Fahrenhorst 8'; Reis 33'; Christiansen 105' (pen.)		Lokvenc 22', 27', 102'	Stadium: Ruhrstadion; Attendance: 22,199; Referee: Franz-Xaver Wack (Biberbach)
	Penalties
	Schindzielorz (penalty missed); Reis (penalty missed); Colding (penalty scored); Guðjónsson (penalty scored); Christiansen (penalty scored)		Koch (penalty missed); Klose (penalty scored); Lokvenc (penalty scored); Grammozis (penalty scored); Bjelica (penalty scored)

== Squad ==
=== Squad and statistics ===
==== Squad, appearances and goals scored ====
No.	Pos	Nat	Player	Total		Bundesliga		DFB-Pokal	
No.	Pos	Nat	Player	Apps	Goals	Apps	Goals	Apps	Goals
1	GK	(Netherlands) NED	Rein van Duijnhoven	30	0	28	0	2	0
2	DF	(Germany) GER	Michael Bemben	27	0	24	0	3	0
3	DF	(Germany) GER	Martin Meichelbeck	25	0	22	0	3	0
4	DF	(Germany) GER	Mirko Dickhaut (until 31 December 2002)	2	0	1	0	1	0
4	MF	(Nigeria) NGA	Sunday Oliseh (since 1 January 2003)	12	0	11	0	1	0
5	DF	(Denmark) DEN	Søren Colding	38	1	34	0	4	1
6	DF	(Cameroon) CMR	Raymond Kalla	30	0	26	0	4	0
7	MF	(Germany) GER	Paul Freier	36	10	32	7	4	3
8	MF	(Germany) GER	Sebastian Schindzielorz	27	2	24	2	3	0
9	FW	(Spain) ESP	Thomas Christiansen	36	23	34	21	2	2
10	MF	(Germany) GER	Dariusz Wosz	34	3	30	2	4	1
11	FW	(Denmark) DEN	Peter Graulund (until 31 December 2002)	9	2	8	2	1	0
12	DF	(Netherlands) NED	Anton Vriesde	19	0	17	0	2	0
13	GK	(Germany) GER	Christian Vander	9	0	7	0	2	0
14	MF	(Iceland) ISL	Þórður Guðjónsson	31	4	29	3	2	1
15	DF	(Germany) GER	Frank Fahrenhorst	30	4	26	3	4	1
16	FW	(Iran) IRN	Vahid Hashemian	37	11	34	10	3	1
17	MF	(Germany) GER	Björn Joppe	0	0	0	0	0	0
18	MF	(Croatia) CRO	Filip Tapalović	22	1	20	1	2	0
19	MF	(Austria) AUT	Dietmar Berchtold	0	0	0	0	0	0
20	FW	(Russia) RUS	Sergei Mandreko	7	0	7	0	0	0
21	FW	(South Africa) RSA	Delron Buckley	32	4	30	3	2	1
22	DF	(Germany) GER	Thomas Reis	21	2	18	1	3	1
23	MF	(Spain) ESP	Cristian Fiél (since 1 January 2003)	7	0	6	0	1	0
26	FW	(Italy) ITA	Luciano Velardi	2	0	2	0	0	0
27	MF	(Germany) GER	Danny Woidtke	0	0	0	0	0	0
29	FW	(Germany) GER	Alexander Thamm (since 22 March 2003)	2	0	2	0	0	0
31	FW	(Germany) GER	Marcus Fischer (since 22 February 2003)	2	0	2	0	0	0
33	MF	(Germany) GER	Sascha Höhle	0	0	0	0	0	0
34	MF	(Germany) GER	David Zajas	1	0	1	0	0	0
44	GK	(Croatia) CRO	Toni Tapalović	0	0	0	0	0	0

=== Transfers ===
==== Summer ====
In:

No.	Pos.	Nation	Player
6	DF	CMR	Raymond Kalla (from CF Extremadura)
12	DF	NED	Anton Vriesde (from KFC Uerdingen 05)
14	MF	ISL	Þórður Guðjónsson (from UD Las Palmas, previously on loan at Preston North End F.C.)
18	MF	CRO	Filip Tapalović (from TSV 1860 Munich)
26	FW	ITA	Luciano Velardi (from VfL Bochum II)
34	MF	GER	David Zajas (from VfL Bochum II)
44	GK	CRO	Toni Tapalović (from FC Schalke 04 II)

Out:

No.	Pos.	Nation	Player
2	DF	CRO	Samir Toplak (to NK Varteks)
12	DF	GER	Thomas Stickroth (retired)
15	DF	GER	Rouven Schröder (to MSV Duisburg)
19	FW	GER	Mike Busch (loan return to VfL Wolfsburg)
23	MF	GER	Dino Toppmöller (to Eintracht Frankfurt)
27	MF	GER	Markus Ehrhard (to SG Wattenscheid 09)
28	DF	GER	Hilko Ristau (to 1. FC Saarbrücken)
29	DF	GER	Axel Sundermann (to SC Verl)
30	GK	GER	Sebastian Selke (to KFC Uerdingen 05)

==== Winter ====
In:

No.	Pos.	Nation	Player
4	MF	NGA	Sunday Oliseh (on loan from Borussia Dortmund)
23	MF	ESP	Cristian Fiél (from 1. FC Union Berlin)
29	FW	GER	Alexander Thamm (from VfL Bochum II)
31	FW	GER	Marcus Fischer (from VfL Bochum II)

Out:

No.	Pos.	Nation	Player
4	DF	GER	Mirko Dickhaut (to SC Schwarz-Weiss Bregenz)
11	FW	DEN	Peter Graulund (on loan to AGF Aarhus)

== VfL Bochum II ==
No.	Pos	Nat	Player	Total		Oberliga Westfalen	
No.	Pos	Nat	Player	Apps	Goals	Apps	Goals
	MF	(Germany) GER	Marek Barudi	9	0	9	0
	MF	(Austria) AUT	Dietmar Berchtold	3	1	3	1
	GK	(Germany) GER	Robert Bochtrup	1	0	1	0
	DF	(Germany) GER	David Czyszczon	29	4	29	4
	DF	(Germany) GER	Mirko Dickhaut (until 31 December 2002)	1	0	1	0
	DF	(Germany) GER	Tim Erfen	2	0	2	0
	DF	(Germany) GER	Thomas Falkowski	15	0	15	0
	FW	(Germany) GER	Marcus Fischer	24	9	24	9
	GK	(Germany) GER	Bastian Görrissen	16	0	16	0
	MF	(Poland) POL	Arek Grad	14	1	14	1
	FW	(Denmark) DEN	Peter Graulund (until 31 December 2002)	1	0	1	0
	MF	(Germany) GER	Sascha Höhle	29	1	29	1
	MF	(Germany) GER	Björn Joppe	18	8	18	8
	DF	(Germany) GER	Christoph Keim	15	0	15	0
	MF	(Germany) GER	Sascha Lindner	19	1	19	1
	FW	(Italy) ITA	Gaetano Manno	27	13	27	13
	DF	(Germany) GER	Mirko Mustroph	28	0	28	0
	FW	(Germany) GER	Gökhan Özdemir	25	12	25	12
	MF	(Germany) GER	Thomas Reis	1	1	1	1
	MF	(Germany) GER	Roger Schajor	1	0	1	0
	GK	(Germany) GER	Henning Schubert	9	0	9	0
	MF	(Croatia) CRO	Filip Tapalović	1	0	1	0
	GK	(Croatia) CRO	Toni Tapalović	8	0	8	0
	FW	(Germany) GER	Alexander Thamm	27	3	27	3
	GK	(Germany) GER	Christian Vander	1	0	1	0
	FW	(Italy) ITA	Luciano Velardi	32	17	32	17
	DF	(Netherlands) NED	Anton Vriesde	7	0	7	0
	MF	(Turkey) TUR	Ali Vural	8	0	8	0
	MF	(Germany) GER	Danny Woidtke	33	6	33	6
	MF	(Turkey) TUR	Engin Yavuzaslan	24	1	24	1
	MF	(Germany) GER	David Zajas	29	0	29	0
