= 2005–06 Regionalliga =

12th season of the Regionalliga as a third-level league

Regionalliga
- Season: 2005–06
- Promoted: Rot-Weiss Essen; FC Carl Zeiss Jena; FC Augsburg; TuS Koblenz
- Relegated: SC Preußen Münster; SG Wattenscheid 09; Rot-Weiß Oberhausen; 1. FC Köln II; Chemnitzer FC; SpVgg Bayreuth; SV Eintracht Trier 05; SSV Jahn Regensburg; 1. FC Eschborn

The 2005–06 Regionalliga season was the twelfth season of the Regionalliga at tier three of the German football league system. It was contested in two geographical divisions with eighteen teams in the south and nineteen in the north. The champions, Rot-Weiss Essen and FC Augsburg, and the runners-up, FC Carl Zeiss Jena and TuS Koblenz, of every division were promoted to the 2. Bundesliga.

== Team movements ==
=== Promoted to 2. Bundesliga ===
==== From Nord ====
- Kickers Offenbach
- Sportfreunde Siegen

==== From Süd ====
- SC Paderborn 07
- Eintracht Braunschweig^{1}

^{1}Eintracht Braunschweig were promoted due to VfB Lübeck being barred from promotion.

=== Teams Relegated from 2. Bundesliga ===
==== To Nord ====
- Rot-Weiss Essen
- Rot-Weiß Oberhausen
- Rot-Weiß Erfurt

==== To Süd ====
- Eintracht Trier

=== Teams relegated to Oberliga ===
==== From Nord ====
- VfL Wolfsburg II
- Arminia Bielefeld II
- 1. FC Union Berlin
- KFC Uerdingen 05^{2}
- Borussia Dortmund II^{3}

==== From Süd ====
- 1. FSV Mainz 05 II
- FC Nöttingen
- 1. SC Feucht

- ^{2}KFC Uerdingen went withdrew due to serious financial troubles and were relegated to the Oberliga
- ^{3}Borussia Dortmund II withdrew from the Regionalliga and were also relegated to the Oberliga

=== Teams Promoted from Oberliga ===
==== To Nord ====
- SG Wattenscheid 09 (Oberliga Westfalen Champions)
- Kickers Emden (Oberliga Nord Champions)
- Bayer Leverkusen II (Oberliga Nordrhein Champions)
- FC Carl Zeiss Jena (Oberliga NOFV-Süd Champions)

==== To Süd ====
- 1. FC Eschborn (Hessenliga Champions)
- 1. FC Kaiserslautern II (Oberliga Südwest Runners-Up)^{4}
- Karlsruher SC II (Oberliga Baden-Württemberg Champions)

^{4}Despite being champions of Oberliga Südwest, Borussia Neunkirchen were barred from promotion. Instead, 1. FC Kaiserslautern II was promoted to the Regionalliga Süd.

== Regionalligas ==
=== Regionalliga Nord ===
==== Tables ====
Pos	Team	Pld	W	D	L	GF	GA	GD	Pts	Promotion or relegation
1	Rot-Weiss Essen (C, P)	36	23	7	6	67	34	+33	76	Promotion to 2. Bundesliga
2	FC Carl Zeiss Jena (P)	36	22	6	8	58	32	+26	72	Promotion to 2. Bundesliga
3	VfB Lübeck	36	20	9	7	60	36	+24	69	
4	Holstein Kiel	36	19	9	8	64	42	+22	66	
5	Fortuna Düsseldorf	36	18	9	9	62	47	+15	63	
6	FC St. Pauli	36	17	10	9	53	38	+15	61	
7	Hertha BSC II	36	16	7	13	54	44	+10	55	
8	Wuppertaler SV	36	13	12	11	42	42	0	51	
9	Kickers Emden	36	14	7	15	50	45	+5	49	
10	VfL Osnabrück	36	14	7	15	56	58	−2	49	
11	Bayer Leverkusen II	36	13	5	18	56	64	−8	44	
12	Werder Bremen II	36	11	10	15	46	47	−1	43	
13	Hamburger SV II	36	12	7	17	45	48	−3	43	
14	Rot-Weiß Erfurt	36	11	9	16	40	48	−8	42	
15	Preußen Münster (R)	36	12	6	18	37	49	−12	42	Relegation to Oberliga
16	SG Wattenscheid 09 (R)	36	10	9	17	50	65	−15	39	Relegation to Oberliga
17	Rot-Weiß Oberhausen (R)	36	10	9	17	30	53	−23	39	Relegation to Oberliga
18	1. FC Köln II (R)	36	6	8	22	37	74	−37	26	Relegation to Oberliga
19	Chemnitzer FC (R)	36	5	6	25	35	78	−43	21	Relegation to Oberliga

Source: Weltfussball.de
Rules for classification: 1) points; 2) goal difference; 3) number of goals scored.
(C) Champions; (P) Promoted; (R) Relegated

==== Top scorers ====
Pos	Player	Team	Goals
1	(Germany) Thomas Reichenberger	VfL Osnabrück	17
2	(Germany) Marcus Feinbier	Fortuna Düsseldorf	15
2	(Germany) Sebastian Hähnge	FC Carl Zeiss Jena	15
3	(Germany) Marcel Podszus	Fortuna Düsseldorf	14
3	(Germany) Lars Toborg	SG Wattenscheid 09	14
4	(Germany) Danko Boskovic	Rot-Weiss Essen	13
4	(Italy) Massimo Cannizzaro	Kickers Emden	13
4	(Germany) Timo Röttger	Bayer Leverkusen II	13
5	(Malawi) Daniel Chitsulo	1. FC Köln II	12
5	(Germany) Ashkan Dejagah	Hertha BSC II	12
5	(Czech Republic) Pavel Dobry	Holstein Kiel	12
5	(Germany) Dirk Heinzmann	Wuppertaler SV	12

Source: Weltfussball.de

=== Regionalliga Süd ===
==== Table ====
Pos	Team	Pld	W	D	L	GF	GA	GD	Pts	Promotion or relegation
1	FC Augsburg (C, P)	34	23	7	4	73	26	+47	76	Promotion to 2. Bundesliga
2	TuS Koblenz (P)	34	18	12	4	55	31	+24	66	Promotion to 2. Bundesliga
3	SV Wehen	34	17	6	11	63	46	+17	57	
4	TSG Hoffenheim	34	17	5	12	47	34	+13	56	
5	SV Darmstadt 98	34	15	9	10	43	33	+10	54	
6	VfR Aalen	34	15	9	10	43	33	+10	54	
7	VfB Stuttgart II	34	14	11	9	50	43	+7	53	
8	Stuttgarter Kickers	34	12	12	10	56	39	+17	48	
9	SV 07 Elversberg	34	12	12	10	40	37	+3	48	
10	SpVgg Bayreuth (R)	34	11	13	10	51	54	−3	46	Relegation to Oberliga
11	Karlsruher SC II	34	12	6	16	41	51	−10	42	
12	Bayern Munich II	34	11	9	14	34	44	−10	42	
13	1. FC Kaiserslautern II	34	12	5	17	39	44	−5	41	
14	SC Pfullendorf	34	10	10	14	30	34	−4	40	
15	TSV 1860 Munich II	34	9	10	15	39	51	−12	37	
16	Eintracht Trier (R)	34	9	9	16	41	58	−17	36	Relegation to Oberliga
17	Jahn Regensburg (R)	34	7	11	16	37	48	−11	32	Relegation to Oberliga
18	1. FC Eschborn (R)	34	1	7	26	15	84	−69	10	Relegation to Oberliga

Source: Weltfussball.de
Rules for classification: 1) points; 2) goal difference; 3) number of goals scored.
(C) Champions; (P) Promoted; (R) Relegated

==== Top scorers ====
Pos	Player	Team	Goals
1	(Romania) Maximilian Nicu	SV Wehen	16
1	(Nigeria) Christian Okpala	FC Augsburg	16
2	(Senegal) Salif Keita	TuS Koblenz	15
2	(Germany) Bakary Diakité	SV Wehen	15
2	(Germany) Bernd Nehrig	VfB Stuttgart II	15
3	(Germany) Enrico Kern	Jahn Regensburg	14
4	(Tunisia) Najeh Braham	Eintracht Trier	12
4	(Argentina) Matias Cenci	SV Darmstadt 98	12
4	(Brazil) Elton Da Costa	FC Augsburg	12
4	(Georgia (country)) Mikheil Sajaia	SpVgg Bayreuth	12
5	(Germany) Nicky Adler	TSV 1860 München II	11
5	(Germany) Martin Driller	SpVgg Bayreuth	11
5	(Germany) Anel Džaka	TuS Koblenz	11

Source: Weltfussball.de
