= Peter Skov-Jensen =

Danish footballer (born 1971)

Personal information
- Full name: Peter Skov-Jensen
- Date of birth: 9 June 1971 (age 55)
- Place of birth: Esbjerg, Denmark
- Height: 5 ft 11 in (1.80 m)
- Position: Goalkeeper

Team information
- Current team: BK Avarta (Goalkeeper coach)

Senior career*
Years	Team	Apps	(Gls)
1990–1997	Esbjerg fB	159	(0)
1997–1999	Herning Fremad	48	(0)
1999–2005	FC Midtjylland	166	(0)
2005–2007	VfL Bochum	29	(0)
2007–2008	Sandefjord Fotball	4	(0)
2008	Køge Boldklub	7	(0)
Total		416	(0)

International career
1990	Denmark U-21	3	(0)
2002–2004	Denmark	4	(0)

Managerial career
- 2008–: BK Avarta (Goalkeeper coach)
- * Club domestic league appearances and goals

Peter Skov-Jensen (born 9 June 1971) is a Danish former professional football player who was a goalkeeper. He among others played for the German club VfL Bochum in the Bundesliga championship. He works a goalkeeper coach at BK Avarta. Skov-Jensen played four games for the Denmark national team, and was part of the Danish squad at the 2004 European Championship.

== Biography ==
Peter Skov-Jensen started his career in 1990, with Esbjerg fB in the Danish 2nd Division. He was a part of an Esbjerg team that eventually settled in the Danish 1st Division, before he moved to league rivals Herning Fremad in 1997. He continued in the club as Herning Fremad merged with Ikast fS to form FC Midtjylland (FCM) in 1999. Skov-Jensen helped FCM gain promotion for the top-flight Danish Superliga championship in 2001. He played all 33 games of the 2001–02 Superliga season, as FCM conceded the second-fewest goals in the league, and won bronze medals.

He was a part of the Denmark national team, as an understudy for starting goalkeeper Thomas Sørensen. When Sørensen suffered an injury in fall 2002, Skov-Jensen made his national team debut in a UEFA Euro 2004 qualifying game against Luxembourg on 12 October 2002. Skov-Jensen also played the following national team game, a friendly match against Poland, before Sørensen recovered and Skov-Jensen lost his place as starting goalkeeper.

He suffered a broken toe in March 2004, but returned to play the 2004 Danish Cup final, which FC Midtjylland lost, in May 2004. He was selected to represent Denmark at the 2004 European Championship, but spent the tournament as an unused substitute for Thomas Sørensen. When Sørensen was injured in October 2004, Skov-Jensen was once more called upon to tend the goal, in the two 2006 FIFA World Cup qualifying games against Albania and Turkey. In January 2005, Skov-Jensen moved abroad to play for VfL Bochum in the German Bundesliga, alongside compatriots Peter Madsen, Tommy Bechmann and Søren Colding.

His first year at Bochum was no success, as he only played two games in a season that saw Bochum relegated to the 2. Bundesliga. He became a part of the starting line-up in November 2005, but suffered an injury in a December 2005 game against SpVgg Unterhaching. He returned to the team in March 2006, and played 10 of the last 11 games of the season, as Bochum won promotion back to the Bundesliga. He was Bochum's starting goalkeeper of the 2006–07 Bundesliga season, but following a 6–0 defeat to Werder Bremen in October, he was demoted to the substitutes' bench. He returned to the starting line-up in November, but following the signing of Czech goalkeeper Jaroslav Drobný in December, he was Bochum's second-choice goalkeeper once more. He left Bochum for the Norwegian Sandefjord Fotball at the end of the 2006–07 season.

In January 2008 he moved to Køge Boldklub on an amateur contract. After six months at Køge he ended his playing career and got a job as goalkeeper coach at BK Avarta.
