= Vriesde =

Vriesde is a surname. Notable people with the surname include:

- Anton Vriesde (born 1968), Dutch footballer
- Letitia Vriesde (born 1964), Surinamese middle-distance runner
