= Philipp Bönig =

German footballer (born 1980)

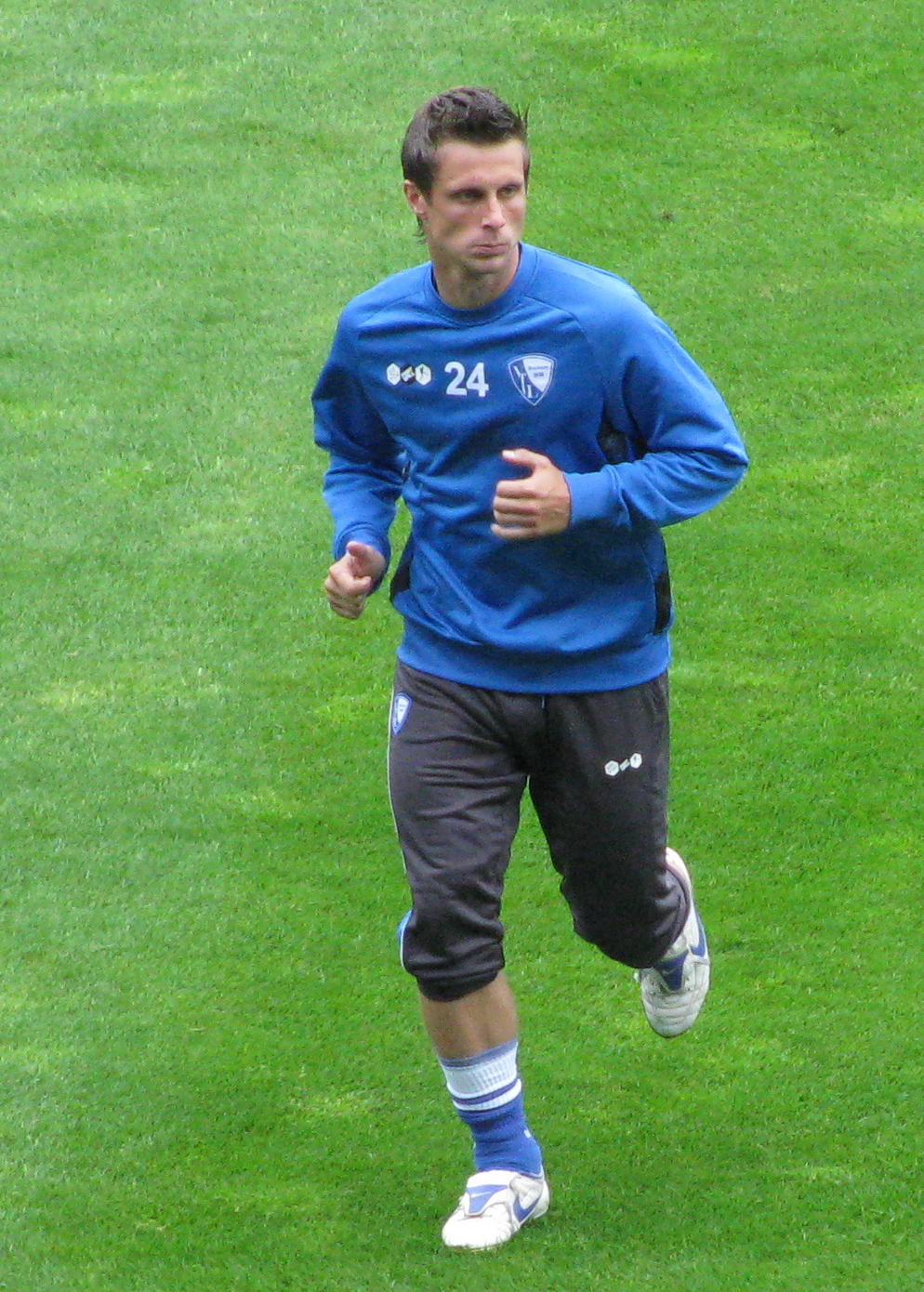
- Bönig in 2009

Personal information
- Date of birth: 20 March 1980 (age 46)
- Place of birth: Erding, West Germany
- Height: 1.78 m (5 ft 10 in)
- Position: Left-back

Youth career
- 1986–1994: SE Freising
- 1994–2000: Bayern Munich

Senior career*
Years	Team	Apps	(Gls)
1999–2001	Bayern Munich II	35	(0)
2001–2003	MSV Duisburg	69	(3)
2003–2012	VfL Bochum	170	(0)
2009–2012	→ VfL Bochum II	5	(0)
2012–2015	Ferencváros	56	(3)
Total		335	(6)

International career
2003–2004	Germany B	3	(0)

Managerial career
- 2016–2017: JFG Sempt Erding (U19)
- 2018–2019: BCF Wolfratshausen
- 2019: VfR Garching
- * Club domestic league appearances and goals

Philipp Bönig (born 20 March 1980) is a German former professional footballer who played as a left-back, and a manager.

== Career ==
=== Youth ===
Born in Erding (Bavaria), West Germany, Bönig started to play football at the local club Eintracht Freising. His first position was keeper but after a couple of matches he moved to the left offensive midfield. Two of his brothers are also football players: his brother Sebastian played more than hundred matches in the second Bundesliga for LR Ahlen and Union Berlin, and his youngest brother Vincent played in the second team of FC Ingolstadt 04.

After impressing as a junior, Bönig joined Bayern Munich as a 14-year-old in 1994 and played there for seven years. In the last year he established himself in the second team of the club which played in the Regionalliga. While playing at Bayern Munich, Bönig made twenty starts for the German national youth teams.

=== MSV Duisburg ===
In 2001, Bönig started his professional career at MSV Duisburg in the 2. Bundesliga and stayed for two seasons at this club. In this period he made 66 matches and scored two goals. Since his contract expired at the summer of 2003 he got offers from different clubs and he decided to move to then Bundesliga club, VfL Bochum.

=== VfL Bochum ===
In his first season 2003–04 VfL Bochum qualified itself for the UEFA Cup and Bönig played three matches for Team 2006. However, in the following season Bochum were relegated to the 2. Bundesliga. But in the next season, they returned directly to the highest level again. After Bochum could maintain themselves in the season 2006–07 his contract was extended until the season 2009–10. In the winter of 2009 Tomasz Zdebel left the club which made Bönig the longest-serving player at the club in the selection.

Bönig acts normally as left defender. His biggest assets are his mentality and fighting spirit, which made him to a crowd-pleaser in the past years. He never scored a goal in the German Bundesliga in his over 150 matches.

== Coaching career ==
Bönig started his coaching career with the U19s of JFG Sempt Erding in October 2016. In April 2018 it was confirmed, that he would take charge of BCF Wolfratshausen from the 2018-19 season. He left the position in the summer 2019 to become the manager of VfR Garching. After only 16 games, Bönig resigned by mutual consent on 30 October 2019 after the team had been in the relegation zone for several games.

== Career statistics ==
Appearances and goals by club, season and competition
Club	Season	League			National cup (Note: German Cup and Hungarian Cup.)		League cup (Note: German League Cup.)		Continental (Note: UEFA Cup/Europa League.)		Total	
Club	Season	Division	Apps	Goals	Apps	Goals	Apps	Goals	Apps	Goals	Apps	Goals
Bayern Munich II	1998–99	Regionalliga Süd	1	0	—		—		—		1	0
Bayern Munich II	1999–00	Regionalliga Süd	5	0	—		—		—		5	0
Bayern Munich II	2000–01	Regionalliga Süd	29	0	—		—		—		29	0
Bayern Munich II	Total		35	0	0	0	0	0	0	0	35	0
MSV Duisburg	2001–02	2. Bundesliga	33	1	1	0	—		—		34	1
MSV Duisburg	2002–03	2. Bundesliga	33	1	2	1	—		—		35	2
MSV Duisburg	Total		66	2	3	1	0	0	0	0	69	3
VfL Bochum	2003–04	Bundesliga	28	0	1	0	1	0	—		30	0
VfL Bochum	2004–05	Bundesliga	29	0	2	0	1	0	2	0	34	0
VfL Bochum	2005–06	2. Bundesliga	19	0	1	0	—		—		20	0
VfL Bochum	2006–07	Bundesliga	30	0	3	0	—		—		33	0
VfL Bochum	2007–08	Bundesliga	25	0	0	0	—		—		25	0
VfL Bochum	2008–09	Bundesliga	18	0	1	0	—		—		18	0
VfL Bochum	2009–10	Bundesliga	10	0	0	0	—		—		10	0
VfL Bochum	2010–11	2. Bundesliga	6	0	1	0	—		—		7	0
VfL Bochum	2011–12	2. Bundesliga	5	0	1	0	—		—		6	0
VfL Bochum	Total		170	0	10	0	2	0	2	0	184	0
VfL Bochum II	2009–10	Regionalliga West	2	0	—		—		—		2	0
VfL Bochum II	2010–11	Regionalliga West	1	0	—		—		—		1	0
VfL Bochum II	2011–12	Regionalliga West	2	0	—		—		—		2	0
VfL Bochum II	Total		5	0	0	0	0	0	0	0	5	0
Ferencváros	2012–13	NB I.	7	0	0	0	1	0	—		8	0
Ferencváros	2013–14	NB I.	24	2	1	1	7	0	—		32	3
Ferencváros	2014–15	NB I.	15	0	1	0	2	0	1	0	19	0
Ferencváros	Total		46	2	2	1	10	0	1	0	59	3
Career total			322	4	15	2	12	0	3	0	352	6

== Honours ==
Ferencváros

- Hungarian Cup: 2014–15
- Hungarian League Cup: 2012–13, 2014–15

VfL Bochum

- 2. Bundesliga: 2005–06
