= Emmerke =

Coordinates: 52°11′N 9°52′E

Emmerke is a part of the municipality of Giesen in the district of Hildesheim, Lower Saxony, in north-western Germany.

== Geography ==
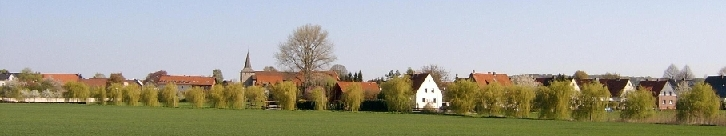
Panoramic view of Emmerke from the south

Emmerke is approx.6 km of the district town Hildesheim and 25 km from the state capital Hanover

== Description ==
Emmerke has 1,752 inhabitants as of May 2004. It is about 6 km away from the district town of Hildesheim and 25 km from the state capital of Hanover. History documents that the village of Emmerke is the oldest settlement in the area. It was named in 854 in a goods inventory of the monastery of Corvey under the place name of Anmarki in Scotelingen.

Also the Hildesheimer church was built in Emmerke. Some early documents were lost and brought back by Bishop Hezilo of Hildesheim (1054–1179). The foundation charter of the Godehardiklosters of 1146 states the name comes from Embrike and was modified in 1250 and 1251 to read 'Embreke'. Embrike belonged to Kleinen pin Hildesheim and thus to the few predominantly catholic municipalities in the eastern Lower Saxony.
