= Marcos Abad =

Spanish Goalkeeper Coach (born 1985)

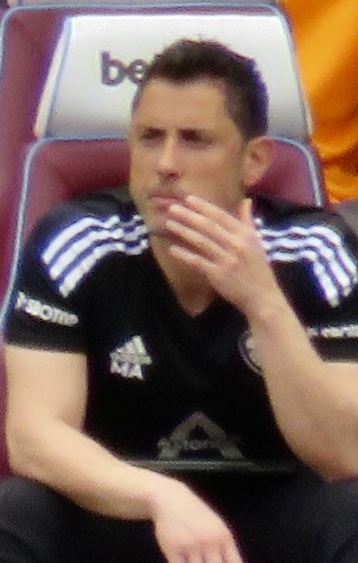
- Abad in 2023

Personal information
- Full name: Marcos Abad Peidró
- Date of birth: 12 September 1985 (age 41)
- Place of birth: Alcoy, Spain

Team information
- Current team: Valencia (goalkeeper coach)

Managerial career
- Years: Team
- 2009–2010: Alcoyano (goalkeeper coach)
- 2010–2017: Elche (goalkeeper coach)
- 2017: Middlesbrough (goalkeeper coach)
- 2017–2023: Leeds United (goalkeeper coach)
- 2023–2024: West Bromwich Albion (goalkeeper coach)
- 2024-: Valencia (goalkeeper coach)

Marcos Abad Peidro (born 12 September 1985) is a Spanish goalkeeper coach who works as first team goalkeeper coach at La Liga club Valencia.

== Career ==
After graduating the University Of Alicante with a Bachelor of Science in Physical Activity and Sports degree he started his goalkeeping coach career in 2009 when he joined Spanish side Alcoyano where they made the playoffs to earn promotion from the second division with Paco López coach. In 2010, Abad joined Elche, where he worked with goalkeepers like Przemysław Tytoń, Willy Caballero, Toño, Juan Carlos Sánchez, Juan Carlos Martín. He was able to develop his knowledge with coaches of the calibre of José Bordalás, Fran Escribá, Rubén Baraja and, Alberto Toril. Abad held the role of goalkeeper coach at Spanish La Liga Side Elche for seven years before joining Aitor Karanka at Middlesbrough in February 2017, the move saw him link up with goalkeepers Victor Valdes, Brad Guzan and Dimitrios Konstantopoulos.

After the sacking of Karanka towards the end of the 2016–17 season and the departure of director of football Victor Orta in the summer, Abad left the club in the summer of 2017.

On 19 June 2017, Abad was announced as the new goalkeeper coach of Leeds United, again linking up with Victor Orta as part of new head coach Thomas Christiansen's backroom staff. Orta revealed in the press conference unveiling Christiansen that Abad had turned down a higher wage in the Chinese Super League to join Leeds in the role.

In the 2018–19 season he was responsible for the training of goalkeepers under the orders of Marcelo Bielsa.

The season started with two young goalkeepers: Jamal Blackman who would suffer a serious injury, and Bailey Peacock-Farrell who became an international with Northern Ireland national team. Blackman's injury allowed Leeds to incorporate a new goalkeeper from Real Madrid, Kiko Casilla.

Ahead of the 2019–20 season, he also became translator for head coach Bielsa.

They managed to be champions of Championship with Leeds United under Bielsa and with it won promotion to the Premier League.

He was confirmed as West Bromwich Albion's new goalkeeping coach in July 2023.

In December 2024, Abad joined Valencia as their new goalkeeping coach.
