= Massimo Cannizzaro =

German footballer (born 1981)

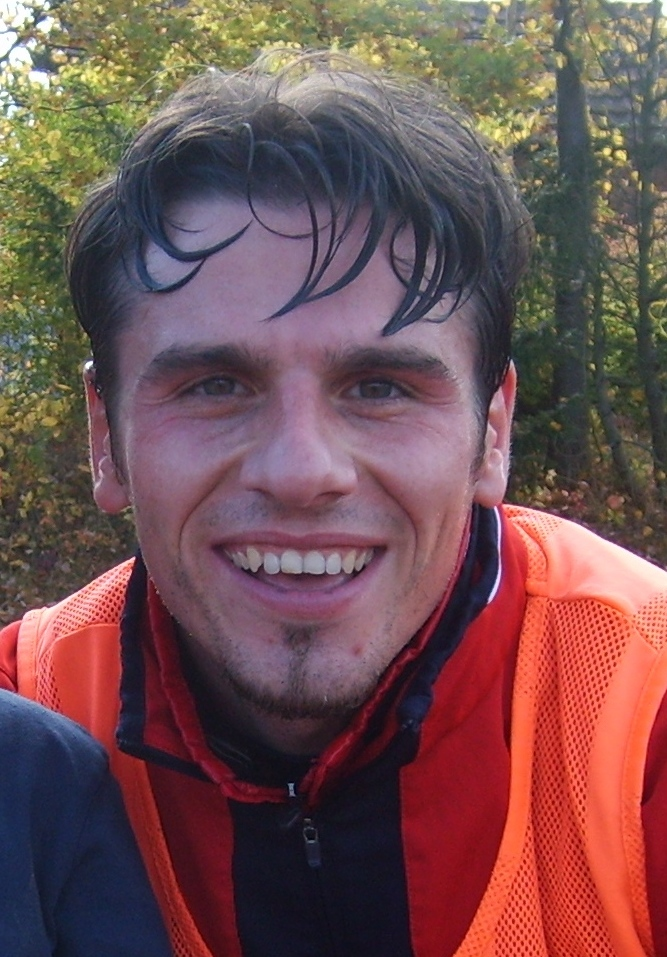
- Cannizzaro in 2008

Personal information
- Date of birth: 3 April 1981 (age 45)
- Place of birth: Cologne, West Germany
- Height: 1.81 m (5 ft 11 in)
- Position: Striker

Youth career
- 1995–1997: Fortuna Köln
- 1997–2000: TSV Rodenkirchen

Senior career*
Years	Team	Apps	(Gls)
2000–2002	1. FC Köln II		
2002–2003	MSV Duisburg II		
2003–2004	Equipe Romagna		
2005	KFC Uerdingen 05	14	(6)
2005–2006	Kickers Emden	32	(13)
2006–2008	Hamburger SV II	53	(24)
2008–2009	Rot-Weiß Erfurt	17	(8)
2010	Holstein Kiel	12	(8)
2010–2011	TuS Koblenz	15	(3)
2012–2013	Fortuna Köln	15	(3)

Managerial career
- 2013–2014: Fortuna Köln (assistant)
- * Club domestic league appearances and goals

Massimo Cannizzaro (born 3 April 1981) is a German football coach and former player.

== Life and career ==
Cannizzaro's parents, both from the Sicilian town of Modica, moved to Cologne, where he was born, to work in the gastronomy industry. In an interview, he said that italian footballer Roberto Baggio is his idol.

Despite his hopes, he was never called up to the Italian U18 team. This would have extended his career to international football.
