= Tommy Bechmann =

Danish footballer (born 1981)

Personal information
- Date of birth: 22 December 1981 (age 44)
- Place of birth: Aarhus, Denmark
- Height: 1.83 m (6 ft 0 in)
- Positions: Winger; forward

Youth career
- Hjortshøj/Egå
- AGF
- Skovbakken
- –2002: FC Aarhus

Senior career*
Years	Team	Apps	(Gls)
2002–2004	Esbjerg	63	(32)
2004–2008	VfL Bochum	82	(13)
2008–2011	SC Freiburg	49	(8)
2011–2017	SønderjyskE	145	(33)
Total		339	(86)

International career
2001	Denmark U19	1	(0)
2002	Denmark U20	5	(0)
2002–2003	Denmark U21	15	(11)
2004	Denmark League XI	3	(2)
- * Club domestic league appearances and goals

Tommy Bechmann (born 22 December 1981) is a Danish former professional footballer who played as a winger or forward.

== Career ==
=== Early years ===
Bechmann began his active career in 2000 at FC Aarhus, now called Aarhus Fremad. In 2002, he moved to first division side Esbjerg fB. In West Jutland he gained a regular place.

=== VfL Bochum ===
In the 2004–05 season, Bechmann moved abroad and signed with VfL Bochum, who played at that time still in the Bundesliga. At this time, there were two other Danish compatriots with Søren Colding and Peter Madsen under contract at the club from the Ruhr region (Ruhrgebiet). He gave his debut for the club on 7 August 2004, when he came on the opening day of the Bundesliga against Hertha BSC. He scored his is first goal for the Westphalians on 19 September 2004, when he marked the 1–0 lead in the match against SC Freiburg. At the end of the season, he had played 27 Bundesliga games, but the club was relegated to the 2. Bundesliga.

In the coming years, Bechmann could never achieve a regular starting place in Bochum, he wandered between the starting lineup and the bench due to injuries. After the 2005–06 season, which ended with Bochum's promotion to the Bundesliga, he had surgery on the knee and played only eleven times in the 2006–07 season. 2007–08, his last season in Bochum, was initially very successful, as he scored four goals in the first four games but he was injured again in the second half of the season.

=== SC Freiburg ===
After his contract expired in Bochum, he moved to SC Freiburg who were playing in the second division. In his first season for the Breisgau side he scored seven goals and the club was promoted to the Bundesliga.

=== SønderjyskE ===
In 2011, Bechmann returned to his homeland and signed for Danish first division club SønderjyskE. On 17 July 2011, matchday one of the league, he made his starting eleven debut for the Slesvigers in a 2–0 defeat against FC Copenhagen. Bechmann made 25 appearances and scored five goals in league matches. In the following season he played 32 matches and scored eight goals.

On 9 January 2017, he retired from professional football.

== Personal life ==
On 28 October 2017, Bechmann won 5 million kroner (approx. €672,000) in the Danish Lotto lottery.

== Honours ==
Individual

- Danish Superliga topscorer: 2003–04
