= Lars Marten =

German footballer

Personal information
- Full name: Lars Marten
- Date of birth: 23 March 1984 (age 42)
- Place of birth: Lüdenscheid, West Germany
- Height: 1.95 m (6 ft 5 in)
- Position: Defender

Youth career
- Rot-Weiß Lüdenscheid
- –2002: Sportfreunde Oestrich-Iserlohn
- 2002–2003: VfL Bochum

Senior career*
Years	Team	Apps	(Gls)
2003–2005	VfL Bochum II	14	(0)
2005–2009	Wuppertaler SV	6	(0)
2005–2008	Wuppertaler SV II	53	(1)
2009–2011	Fortuna Köln	35	(1)
- * Club domestic league appearances and goals

Lars Marten (born 23 March 1984) is a German former footballer who played as a defender.

== Career ==
Marten made his professional debut in the 3. Liga for Wuppertaler SV on 6 December 2008, starting in the away match against Erzgebirge Aue, which finished as a 0–1 loss.
