= Marcus Fischer =

German footballer (born 1980)

Personal information
- Date of birth: 8 December 1980 (age 45)
- Place of birth: Wittenberg, East Germany
- Height: 1.83 m (6 ft 0 in)
- Position: Forward

Youth career
- Grün-Weiß Piesteritz
- Preußen Lengerich

Senior career*
Years	Team	Apps	(Gls)
1999–2002	Preußen Lengerich		
2002–2004	VfL Bochum II		
2002–2004	VfL Bochum	2	(0)
2004–2005	Preußen Münster	19	(7)
2005–2006	FC Gütersloh		
2006–2008	Eintracht Rheine	55	(29)
2009–2010	Sportfreunde Lotte	40	(15)
2010–2011	SV Elversberg	30	(11)
2011–2013	Sportfreunde Lotte	21	(15)
2013–2014	VfB Nordmark		
2015–2018	TSG Dülmen		
- * Club domestic league appearances and goals

Marcus Fischer (born 12 August 1980) is a German former professional footballer who played as a forward.

== Career ==
Fischer spent two seasons in the Bundesliga with VfL Bochum.

In June 2010 he left Sportfreunde Lotte.
