= Marcel Podszus =

German footballer

Personal information
- Date of birth: 20 August 1976 (age 50)
- Place of birth: Viersen, West Germany
- Height: 1.84 m (6 ft 0 in)
- Position: Striker

Youth career
- 1994–1996: 1. FC Viersen

Senior career*
Years	Team	Apps	(Gls)
1996–1998	FC Remscheid	57	(7)
1998–2000	Bayer 04 Leverkusen II	5	(0)
2000–2002	Chemnitzer FC	42	(6)
2002	SC Fortuna Köln	0	(0)
2003–2004	Borussia Mönchengladbach II	19	(8)
2003–2004	Borussia Mönchengladbach	4	(0)
2004–2007	Fortuna Düsseldorf	87	(26)
2007–2009	1. FC Kleve	48	(23)
2009–2012	Borussia Mönchengladbach II	83	(22)
2012–2013	VfB Speldorf	1	(0)
2013–2016	Rather SV		
2016–2017	MSV Düsseldorf		
2018–2019	DJK Sparta Bilk		
- * Club domestic league appearances and goals

Marcel Podszus (born 20 August 1976) is a German former footballer.

== Career ==
He spent one season in the Bundesliga with Borussia Mönchengladbach.
