= Filip Tapalović =

Croatian footballer and manager

Personal information
- Date of birth: 22 October 1976 (age 50)
- Place of birth: Gelsenkirchen, West Germany
- Height: 1.82 m (6 ft 0 in)
- Position: Midfielder

Team information
- Current team: Borussia Dortmund (assistant)

Youth career
- Fortuna Gelsenkirchen
- –1995: Schalke 04

Senior career*
Years	Team	Apps	(Gls)
1995–1997	VfL Bochum	25	(0)
1997–1999	Schalke 04	18	(0)
1999–2002	1860 Munich	56	(2)
2002–2005	VfL Bochum	44	(2)
2005–2006	Wacker Tirol	31	(0)
2007–2008	Carl Zeiss Jena	18	(2)
2008	NK Rijeka	8	(0)

International career
2002	Croatia	3	(0)

Managerial career
- 2013–2014: 1860 Munich (youth)
- 2014–2015: 1860 Munich (assistant)
- 2017–2019: Adelaide United (assistant)
- 2019–2020: Melbourne Victory (assistant)
- 2021–?: Hamburger SV (assistant)
- 2024: Hull City (assistant)
- 2025–: Borussia Dortmund (assistant)
- * Club domestic league appearances and goals

Filip Tapalović (born 22 October 1976 in Gelsenkirchen, Germany) is a former Croatian international footballer and current assistant coach for Bundesliga club Borussia Dortmund.

== Playing career ==
=== International ===
He made his debut for Croatia in a May 2002 friendly match away against Hungary and earned a total of three caps, scoring no goals. His final international was four months later, a European Championship qualification match against Estonia.

== Managerial career ==
In 2013 he became youth team manager at 1860 Munich. He left the club after two seasons.

On 26 June 2017, he became assistant manager at A-League club Adelaide United. Tapalović departed following Adelaide United's decision not to renew Marco Kurz' contract and followed Kurz to Melbourne Victory where he is currently the club's assistant manager.

On 4 July 2024, Tapalović was appointed as assistant head coach at Hull City. On 27 November 2024, the club parted ways with head coach Tim Walter and his assistant Tapalović, following a run of four straight defeats and nine games without a win.

On 31 January 2025, he was named assistant coach at Borussia Dortmund under Niko Kovač.

== Personal life ==
His brother Toni Tapalović is also a former footballer and was employed as a goalkeeper coach at Bayern Munich.
