= Giesen =

- Municipality
- Coat of arms

- Location of Giesen within Hildesheim district
- Interactive map of Giesen
- Location within Germany Location within Lower Saxony
- Coordinates: 52°12′N 9°53′E
- Country: Germany
- State: Lower Saxony
- District: Hildesheim

Government
  - Mayor (2021–26): Frank Jürges (CDU)

Area
  - Total: 34 km^{2} (13 sq mi)
- Elevation: 85 m (279 ft)

Population (2025-12-31)
  - Total: 9,285
  - Density: 270/km^{2} (710/sq mi)
- Time zone: UTC+01:00 (CET)
  - Summer (DST): UTC+02:00 (CEST)
- Postal codes: 31180
- Dialling codes: 05121, 05066
- Vehicle registration: HI, ALF
- Website: www.giesen.de

Giesen (German pronunciation: [ˈɡiːzn̩]) is a village and a municipality in the district of Hildesheim, in Lower Saxony, Germany. It is situated approximately 6 km northwest of Hildesheim, and 22 km southeast of Hanover.

The municipality includes five villages:

- Ahrbergen (pop. 2,219)
- Emmerke (pop. 1,684)
- Giesen (pop. 3,401)
- Groß Förste (pop. 795)
- Hasede (pop. 1,606)

== Gallery ==
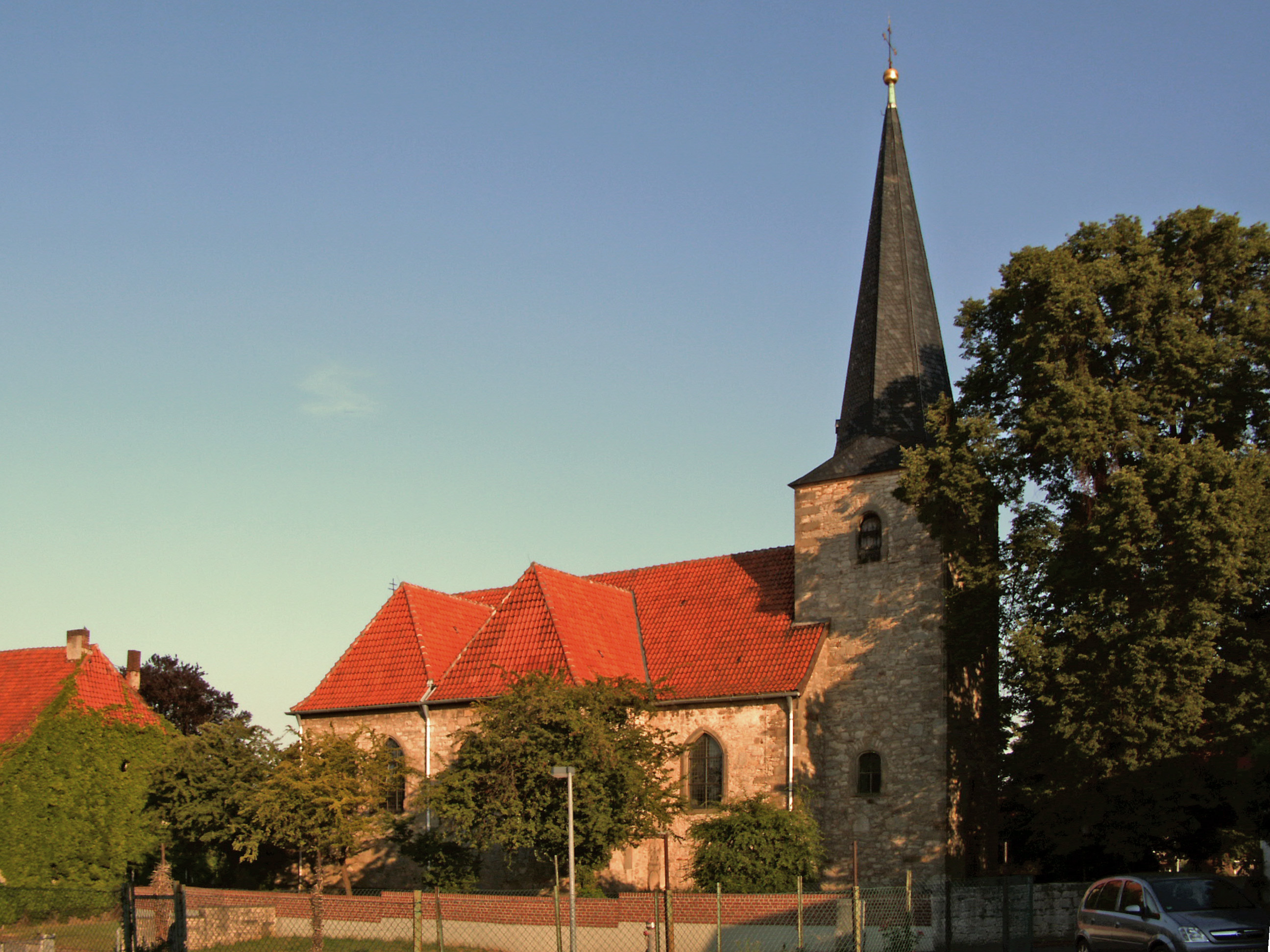
Gross Giesen, Sankt-Vitus-Kirche

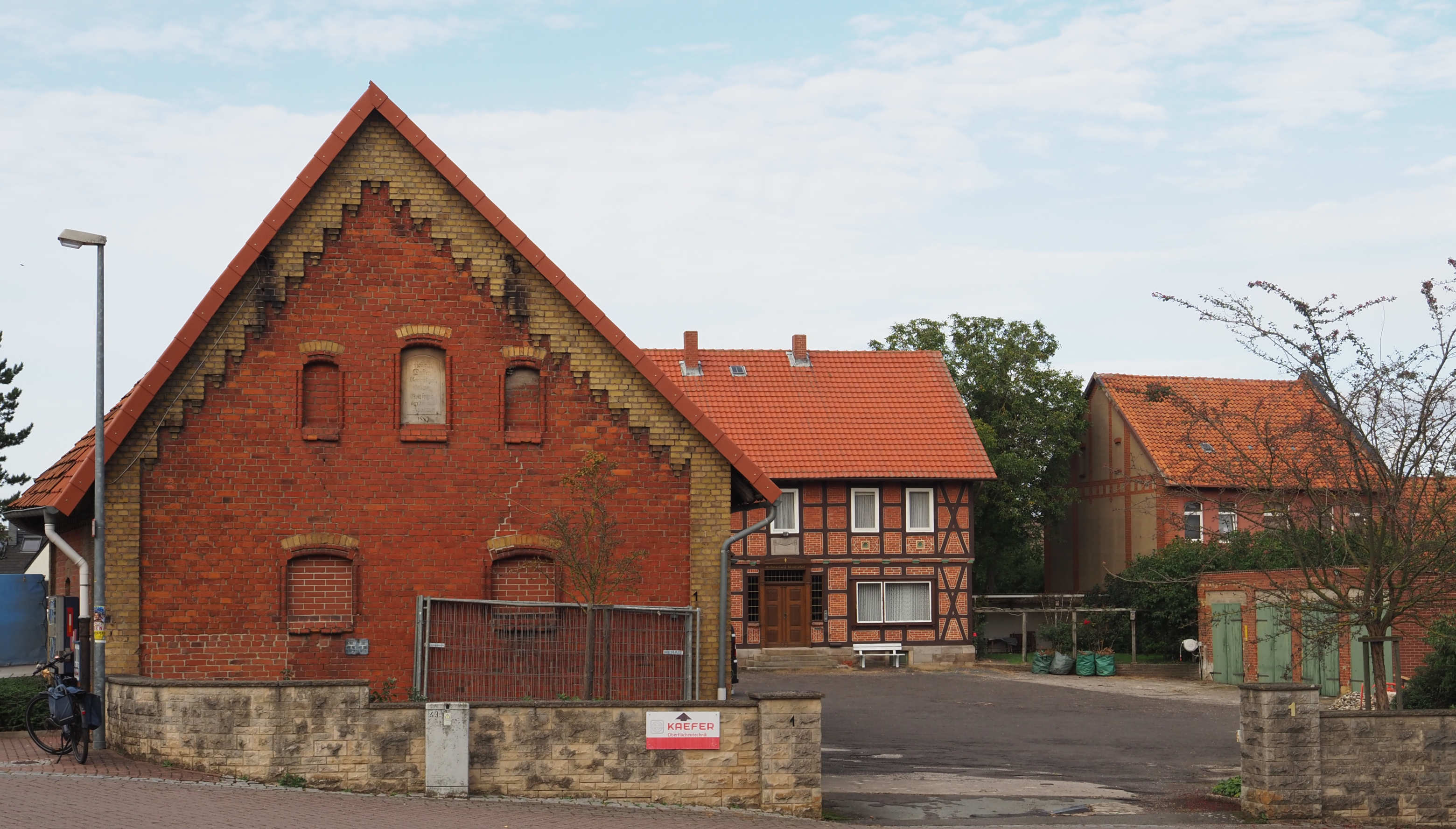
Klein Giesen, estate next to the village place

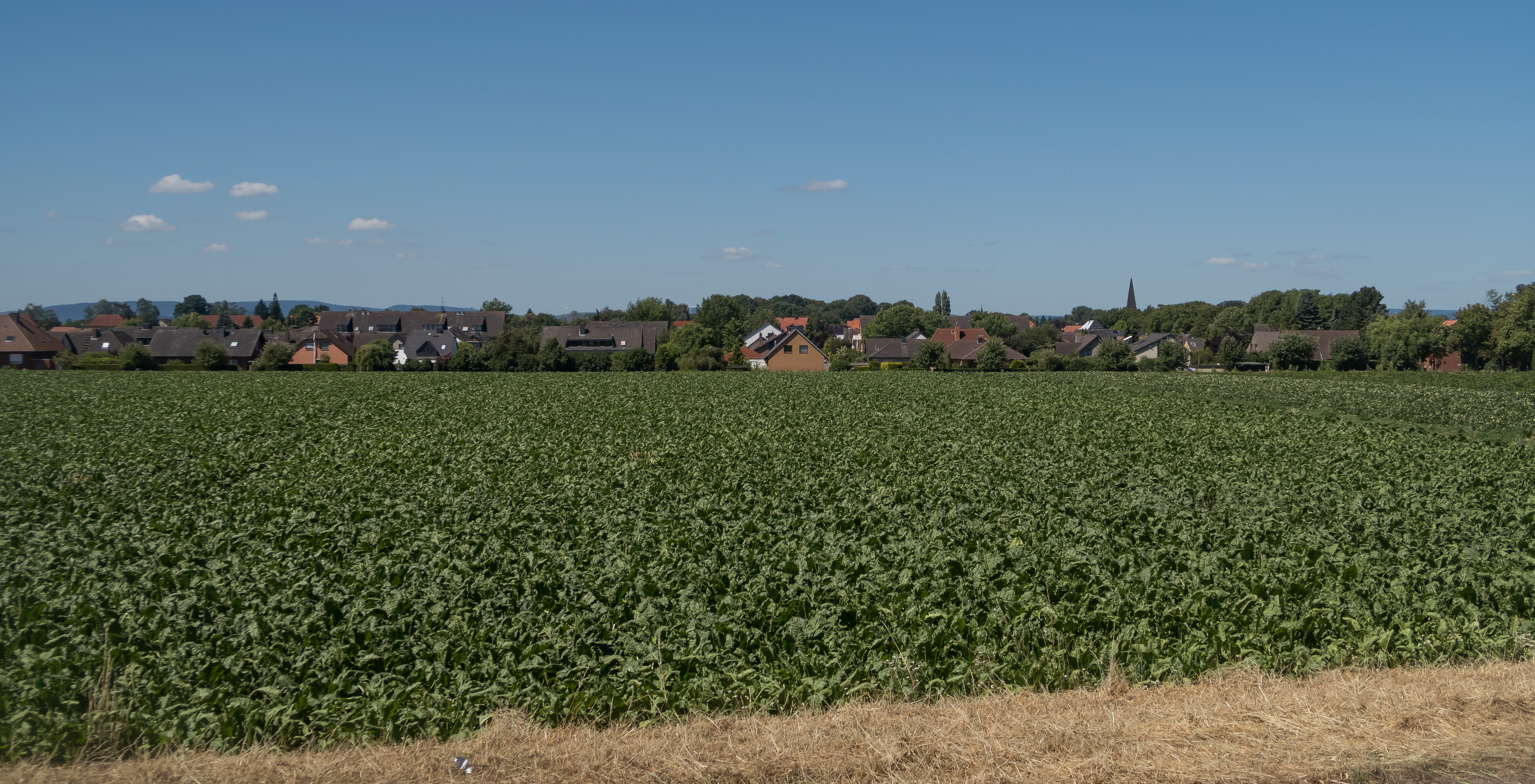
Ahrbergen, view to the village

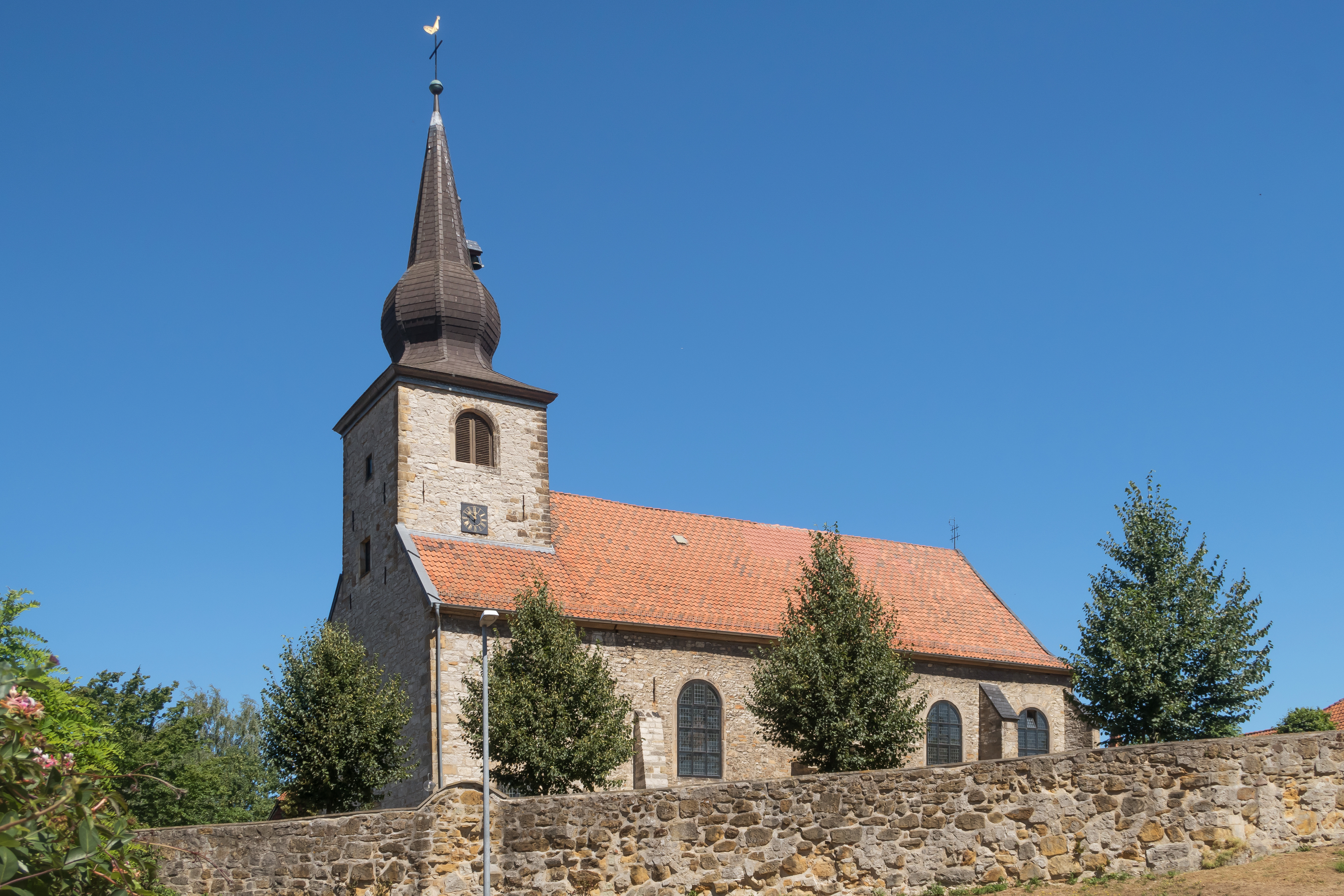
Gross Förste, catholic church: Kirche Sankt Pankratius

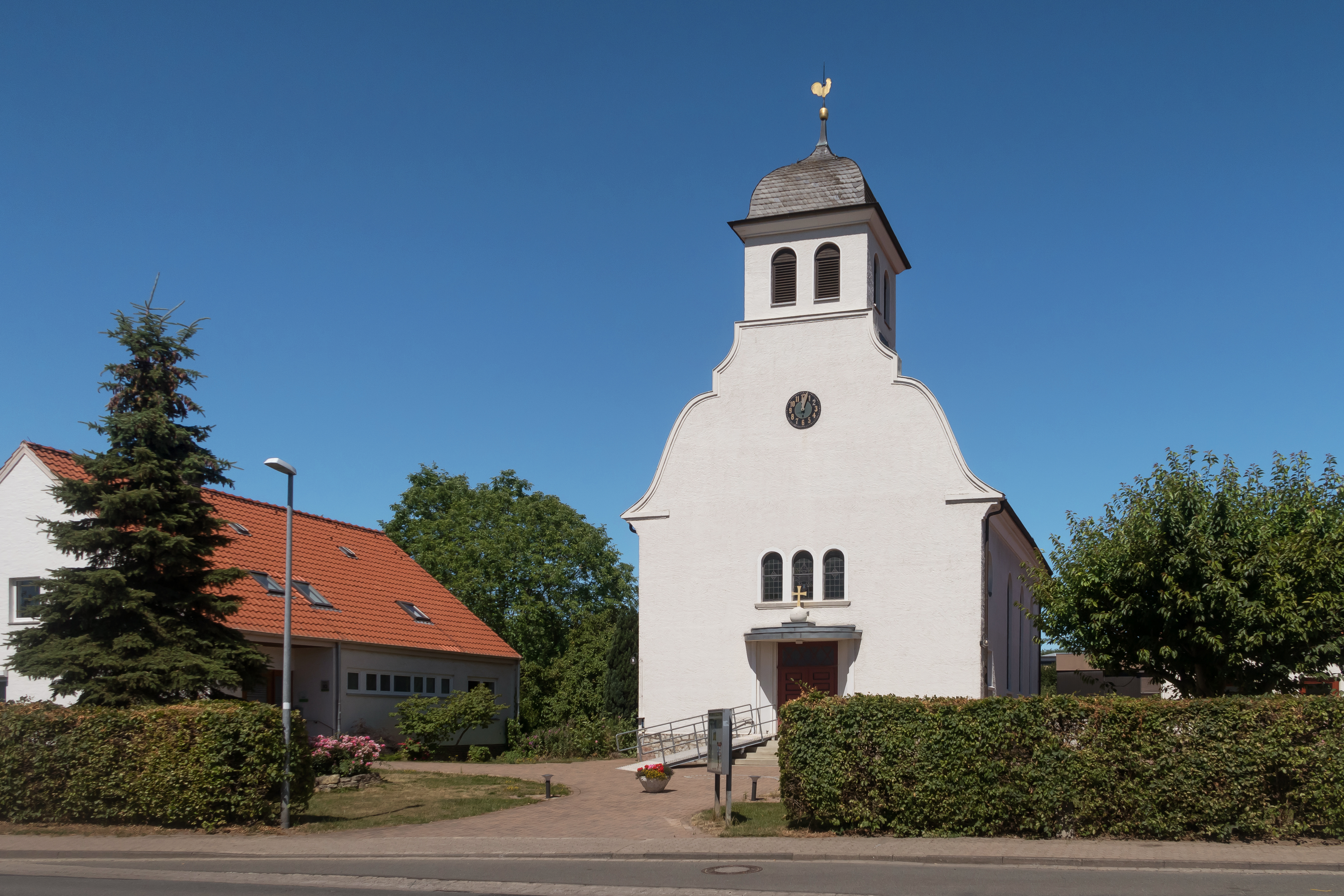
Hasede, church: die Sankt Paulus Kirche

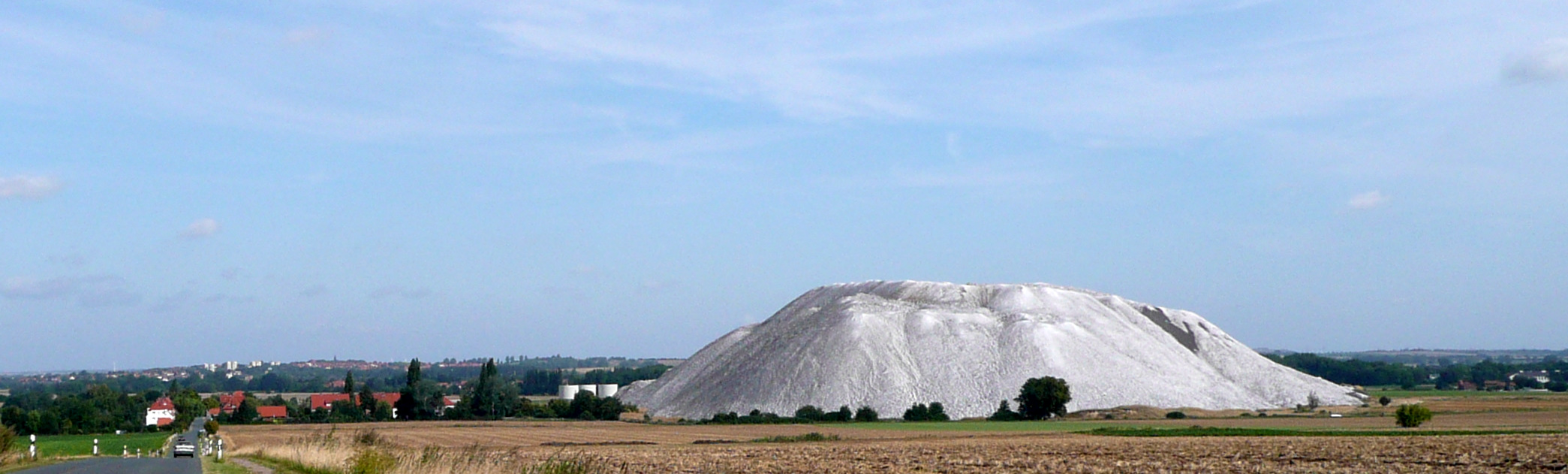
Siegfried-Giesen mining hamlet

== Personalities ==
Sons and daughters of the community:

- Hermann Schnipkoweit (born 1928), politician (CDU)

Personalities associated with this community:

- Michael Weiner (born 1969), football referee, lives in the district of Hasede
