= Toni Tapalović =

Croatian footballer

Personal information
- Full name: Toni Tapalović
- Date of birth: 10 October 1980 (age 46)
- Place of birth: Gelsenkirchen, West Germany
- Height: 1.85 m (6 ft 1 in)
- Position: Goalkeeper

Team information
- Current team: Barcelona (assistant coach)

Senior career*
Years	Team	Apps	(Gls)
1999–2002	Schalke 04 II	46	(0)
2002–2004	VfL Bochum II	19	(0)
2004–2005	Uerdingen 05	26	(0)
2005–2006	Kickers Offenbach	0	(0)
2006–2009	Schalke 04 II	31	(0)
2006–2007	Schalke 04	0	(0)
2009–2010	Mainz 05 II	5	(0)
Total		96	(0)

Managerial career
- 2011–2023: Bayern Munich (goalkeeping coach)
- 2024–: Barcelona (assistant coach)
- * Club domestic league appearances and goals

Toni Tapalović (born 10 October 1980) is a Croatian former professional footballer who is currently the assistant coach of La Liga club Barcelona.

== Club career ==
Throughout his career, he played for lower clubs or for the reserve teams. Tapalović began his career in 1986 at Fortuna Gelsenkirchen. In 1990, he moved to the youth squad of Schalke 04. In 1999, he was promoted to the "A" youth and amateur team. He later received a professional contract for two years, lasting until 2001, but withdrew in August 1999 because of a knee injury in the inner meniscus. In 2002, he moved to VfL Bochum, where he was under contract until January 2004. In both teams he played for in the Bundesliga, he was a substitute goalkeeper without Bundesliga match practice. In January 2004, he joined the Uerdingen 05 in the Regionalliga West. He played there until June 2005. During his time at Uerdingen 05, he made 26 appearances for the team.

In December 2005, Tapalović joined the then second division side Kickers Offenbach, but did not play. In 2006, he returned to FC Schalke 04. After the departure of Frank Rost in January 2007, Tapalović was again the substitute goalkeeper for the team. In 2010, he joined Bundesliga side Mainz 05's second team. In October 2010, Tapalović retired after a test confirmed a torn ACL and a tear of the medial collateral ligament which would force him to be out for six months.

== Coaching career ==
On 1 July 2011, he was appointed as the goalkeeping coach of Bayern Munich. He had a contract with Bayern until 30 June 2021. He later extended his contract until 2023, due to success of working with Manuel Neuer. On 23 January 2023, he was released from his duties at Bayern due to differences about the way of working with other staff members, according to sporting director Hasan Salihamidžić.

== Personal life ==
His brother Filip Tapalović is also a former footballer who played for Croatia national team.
