= Thomas Christiansen =

Danish footballer (born 1973)

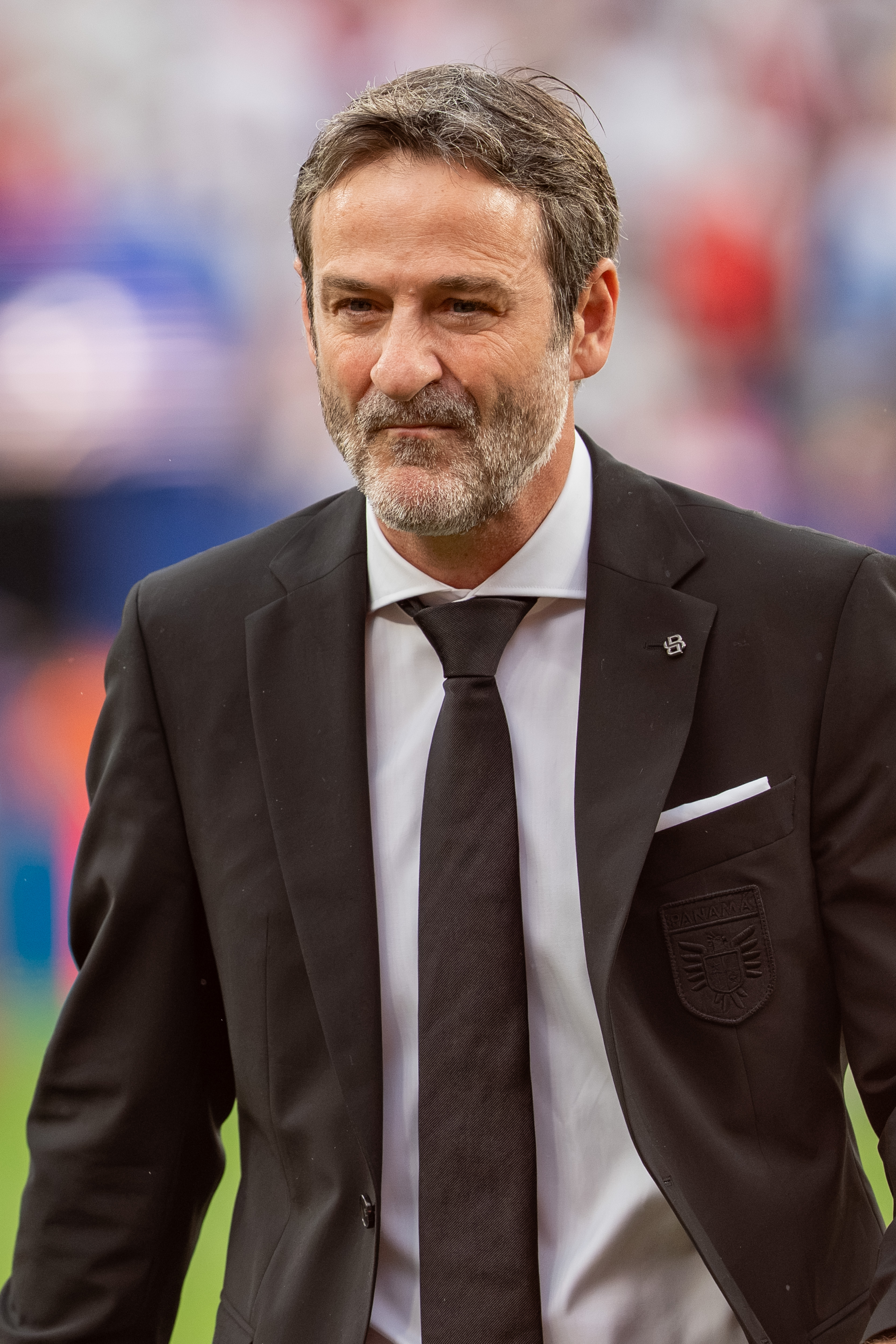
- Christiansen with Panama in 2026

Personal information
- Full name: Thomas Christiansen Tarín
- Date of birth: 11 March 1973 (age 53)
- Place of birth: Hadsund, Denmark
- Height: 1.80 m (5 ft 11 in)
- Position: Striker

Team information
- Current team: Panama (manager)

Youth career
- 1982–1988: Avedøre
- 1988: Brøndby
- 1989–1991: Hvidovre
- 1991: B.93

Senior career*
Years	Team	Apps	(Gls)
1991–1996	Barcelona B	60	(28)
1993–1996	Barcelona	0	(0)
1993	→ Sporting Gijón (loan)	10	(4)
1993–1994	→ Osasuna (loan)	14	(1)
1994–1995	→ Racing Santander (loan)	15	(1)
1996–1997	Oviedo	50	(5)
1997–1999	Villarreal	41	(6)
1999	Terrassa	17	(5)
2000	Panionios	12	(3)
2000	Herfølge	4	(2)
2001–2003	VfL Bochum	76	(38)
2003–2006	Hannover 96	55	(12)
Total		354	(105)

International career
1992–1995	Spain U21	11	(3)
1993	Spain	2	(1)

Managerial career
- 2013: Al Jazira (assistant)
- 2014–2016: AEK Larnaca
- 2016–2017: APOEL
- 2017–2018: Leeds United
- 2019–2020: Union SG
- 2020–: Panama
Medal record
Men's football
Representing Panama (as manager)
CONCACAF Gold Cup
Silver medal – second place	2023 United States–Canada
CONCACAF Nations League
Silver medal – second place	2025 United States
Representing Spain
UEFA European Under-21 Championship
Bronze medal – third place	1994 France
- * Club domestic league appearances and goals

Thomas Christiansen Tarín (Note: Danish: [ˈtsʰʌmæs kʰʁeˈstjænˀsn̩ tsʰɑˈʁin, - kʰʁæˈ-], Spanish: [ˈtomas kɾisˈtjansen taˈɾin].) (born 11 March 1973) is a football manager and former player who played as a striker. He is the current manager of the Panama national team.

He played for a number of clubs in Denmark, Spain and Germany in a 15-year professional career, being crowned top scorer of the 2002–03 Bundesliga while with Bochum. Born in Denmark, he represented the Spanish national team, earning two caps in 1993.

In 2013, Christiansen started working as a manager. He led Panama at two CONCACAF Gold Cups, finishing as runners-up in 2023.

== Playing career ==
=== Early years ===
Born in Hadsund in Denmark to a Spanish mother, Christiansen was raised in Copenhagen. He started playing football aged nine in Avedøre, then spent one year at Brøndby before moving on to Hvidovre.

Christiansen trained with the youth team of Real Madrid, but when his mother forbade him to join the club, he moved to B.93. In May 1991, he scored six goals in a youth team match against KB, and went back to Spain to train with defending La Liga champions Barcelona.

=== Barcelona ===
Christiansen signed a four-year contract with Barcelona in July 1991, when Johan Cruyff was team manager, with a dream of playing alongside their Danish playmaker Michael Laudrup. He started competing as a senior with the reserves, where he soon was joined by compatriot Ronnie Ekelund; during this period, he was frequently called up to train with the main squad, but received almost no playing time due to stiff competition.

When he joined Barcelona, Christiansen agreed to a clause in his contract that stated he would be a Spanish citizen, and thereby not count towards the foreigner quota in the league. After becoming naturalised, he was called up for the under-21 team in December 1992, and scored a goal to help defeat Germany 2–1.

Still playing for Barcelona's B team, Christiansen was called up for the Spain senior squad by manager Javier Clemente, in January 1993, making his debut against Mexico on the 27th and impressing in a game which featured few regulars for the European nation. He prolonged his link with the Catalans until 1997, and made his official debut for the club on 10 February when he played the last seven minutes of the UEFA Super Cup final – first leg – away to Werder Bremen. His final competitive appearance took place in a Copa del Rey tie against Atlético Madrid one week later, and was once more selected to the national team, appearing as a substitute in a 1994 FIFA World Cup qualifier against Lithuania and scoring with a flick of the heel in an eventual 5–0 home win.

Without having played any league games for Barcelona, Christiansen was put on loan at fellow top-division club Sporting de Gijón, in February 1993. He was mostly injured during that stint, but managed four league goals, subsequently returning to the Camp Nou where he suffered another injury during pre-season; other loans followed, first at Osasuna then at Racing de Santander in the 1994–95 season, starting well enough at the latter to earn another call-up by Spain, only to pull out due to injury.

=== Mixed success ===
Spanish league regulations stated that following three years of loan contracts, Barcelona had to compensate Christiansen financially, if they declined any proposed transfer deal. He was first sold to English club Manchester City in October 1995, but wanted to stay in Spain, being instead transferred to Real Oviedo the next January for DKK 4.6 million. Following a good start, he failed to score any goals in his second year even though he appeared in 31 matches, and was sold to Segunda División's Villarreal in November 1997, helping them promote but managing to find the net only once the following campaign, which ended in relegation.

A proposed deal with a Mexican team never materialised, and Christiansen was without a club in 1999. He went on to play for Terrassa in the Spanish lower leagues, finishing that season at Panionios in Greece before returning to Denmark in August 2000, signing with defending Danish champions Herfølge, and showing good form when he scored two goals in a win over eventual runners-up Brøndby.

=== Breakthrough in Germany ===
In January 2001, Christiansen moved to Germany to play for VfL Bochum in the Bundesliga, being relegated to the second division (as with Herfølge) but contributing 17 goals the following season to be the North Rhine-Westphalia's team top scorer as they won promotion; he added 21 in next year's top flight, being crowned joint league top scorer with Giovane Élber of Bayern Munich.

Following that achievement, Christiansen was signed by Hannover 96 in June 2003 to replace Fredi Bobic. He scored nine times in his first year, but failed to reproduce his previous form mainly due to several injuries, including a knee operation and two shinbone ailments; in the summer of 2006, the club chose not to prolong his contract and he left, retiring shortly after at the age of 33.

== Coaching career ==
=== Early spells and AEK ===
Christiansen started his managerial career in the United Arab Emirates, as part of Luis Milla's coaching staff at Al Jazira, arriving in February 2013 and leaving in October as the latter was fired. In late April 2014 he was appointed head coach of AEK Larnaca in the Cypriot First Division, after having been approached for the job by former Barcelona B teammate Xavier Roca, who acted as director of football; in his first two seasons, he led them to consecutive best-ever runner-up league finishes.

Also during the 2015–16 campaign, Christiansen coached his team to the third qualifying round of the UEFA Europa League, losing 4–0 on aggregate to Bordeaux.

=== APOEL ===
On 21 May 2016, after two successful seasons, Christiansen moved to reigning Cypriot champions APOEL, signing a one-year contract effective as of 1 June. On 2 August, they knocked out Rosenborg 4–1 on aggregate in the third qualifying round of the UEFA Champions League, being ousted the following stage by Copenhagen and eventually reaching the last-16 in the Europa League for the first time in their history.

Christiansen won his first managerial title in 2017 after conquering the Cypriot League, losing only two games during the season and having the best defensive record with 27 clean sheets. He also reached the final of the domestic cup, lost 1–0 to Apollon Limassol; on 25 May a meeting between club and coach was held, and subsequently both decided to part ways.

=== Leeds United ===
On 15 June 2017, Christiansen was announced as the new head coach of Championship club Leeds United, after being appointed by new owner Andrea Radrizzani to replace Garry Monk, with the club announcing that they wanted "to appoint someone who can help us create a winning culture at the club and unite everyone connected with Leeds United, from the players to the supporters". Four days later, it was revealed that he would be joined by assistant Julio Bañuelos, fitness coach Iván Torres and goalkeeper coach Marcos Abad.

Christiansen was dismissed on 4 February 2018, after a poor run of results and with the team tenth in the table.

=== Union SG ===
On 1 July 2019, Christiansen was appointed at Belgian First Division B's Union SG. He was released in May 2020.

=== Panama ===
Christiansen was named new manager of the Panama national team on 23 July 2020, replacing Américo Gallego who was released amid a restructuring of the Panamanian Football Federation. His first games were friendlies away to neighbours Costa Rica on 10 and 13 October, both won by a single Abdiel Ayarza goal.

At the 2021 CONCACAF Gold Cup, Christiansen's team were eliminated from the group stage after failing to beat Qatar and Honduras. The 2022 FIFA World Cup qualification campaign was ended by a 5–1 defeat to the United States in Orlando in the penultimate fixture.

Christiansen's Panama came fourth at the CONCACAF Nations League finals in 2023. Later in June and July at the Gold Cup, they won on penalties against hosts the United States in the semi-finals in San Diego, but lost the final to Mexico by a single goal.

On 23 March 2025, Christiansen took the side to the CONCACAF Nations League final, losing 2–1 against Mexico due to a 93rd-minute penalty. On 16 June, in the 5–2 win over Guadeloupe in the Gold Cup opener, he became the coach with the most matches in Panama history with 73, surpassing Hernán Darío Gómez.

On 18 November 2025, following a 3–0 victory against El Salvador, Christiansen qualified the nation for the following year's World Cup, their second appearance ever in the tournament.

== Career statistics ==
=== International goal ===
Score and result list Spain's goal tally first, score column indicates score after Christiansen goal.

International goal scored by Thomas Christiansen
No.	Date	Venue	Opponent	Score	Result	Competition
1	24 February 1993	Benito Villamarín, Seville, Spain	Lithuania	4–0	5–0	1994 World Cup qualification

== Managerial statistics ==
As of 15 November 2026

Managerial record by team and tenure
Team	From	To	Record					Ref
Team	From	To	P	W	D	L	Win %	Ref
AEK Larnaca	1 June 2014	29 April 2016	68	40	14	14	58.8	
APOEL	1 June 2016	31 May 2017	52	31	10	11	59.6	
Leeds United	15 June 2017	4 February 2018	35	15	6	14	42.9	
Union Saint-Gilloise	1 July 2019	22 May 2020	31	13	12	6	41.9	
Panama	22 July 2020	Present	98	44	26	28	44.9	
Total			284	143	68	73	50.4	

== Honours ==
=== Player ===
Barcelona

- UEFA Super Cup: 1992

Spain U21

- UEFA European Under-21 Championship third place: 1994

Individual

- Bundesliga top scorer: 2002–03 (shared with Giovane Élber)

=== Manager ===
APOEL

- Cypriot First Division: 2016–17
- Cypriot Cup runner-up: 2016–17

Panama

- CONCACAF Gold Cup runner-up: 2023
- CONCACAF Nations League runner-up: 2024–25

== See also ==
- List of Spain international footballers born outside Spain
