= Mamadou Diabang =

Senegalese footballer

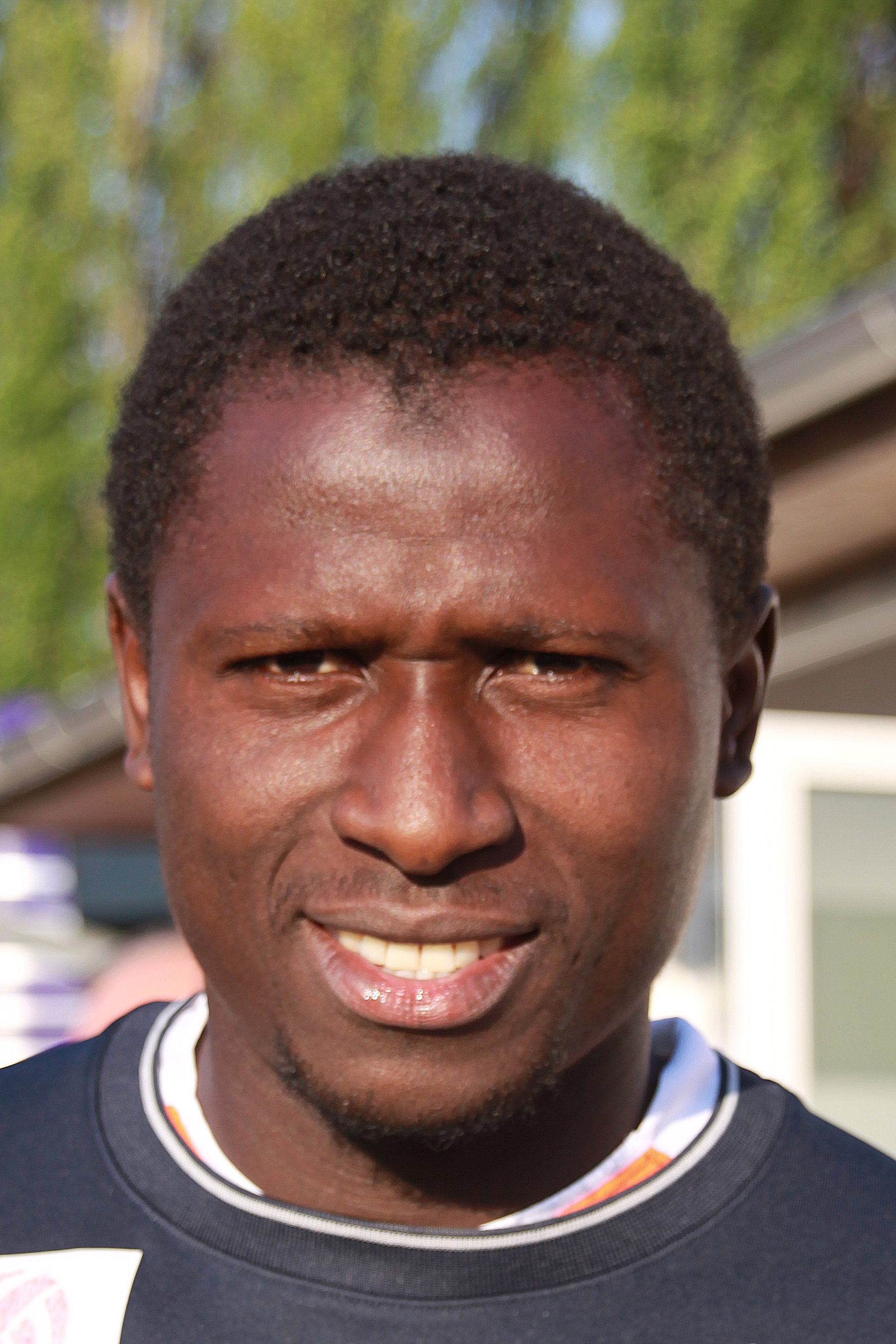
- Diabang with Austria Wien in 2009

Personal information
- Full name: Mamadou-Lamine Diabang
- Date of birth: 21 January 1979 (age 47)
- Place of birth: Dakar, Senegal
- Height: 1.80 m (5 ft 11 in)
- Position: Forward

Youth career
- 1991–1996: ASC Jeanne d'Arc

Senior career*
Years	Team	Apps	(Gls)
1996–1997	ASC Jeanne d'Arc	22	(15)
1997	Atlas Delmenhorst	14	(4)
1998–1999	Rotenburger SV	35	(19)
1999–2000	FC Oberneuland	27	(3)
2000–2003	Arminia Bielefeld	60	(13)
2003–2006	VfL Bochum	44	(8)
2005–2006	→ VfL Bochum II	1	(1)
2006	Kickers Offenbach	13	(8)
2006–2008	FC Augsburg	40	(4)
2008–2010	Austria Wien	47	(7)
2010–2011	VfL Osnabrück	12	(1)
2011	SC Lüstringen		
2012–2013	VfB Lübeck	19	(3)

International career
2001–2003	Senegal	6	(0)
- * Club domestic league appearances and goals

Mamadou-Lamine Diabang (born 21 January 1979) is a Senegalese former professional footballer who played as a forward.
