= Peter Madsen (footballer) =

Danish footballer (born 1978)

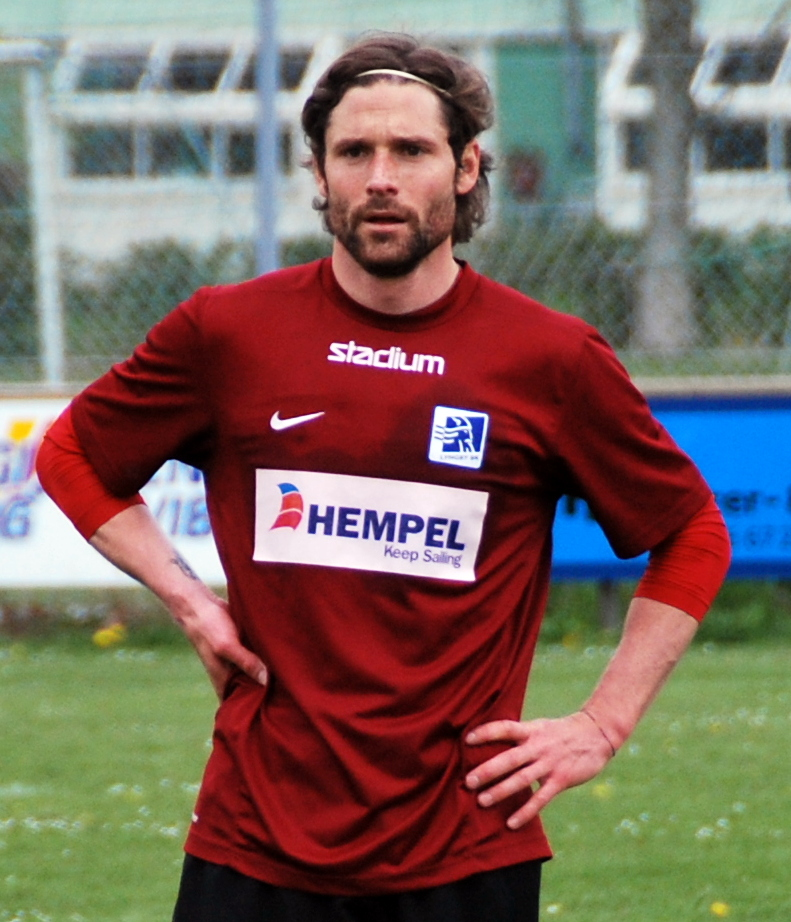
- Madsen with Lyngby in May 2012

Personal information
- Full name: Peter Planch Madsen
- Date of birth: 26 April 1978 (age 48)
- Place of birth: Roskilde, Denmark
- Height: 1.83 m (6 ft 0 in)
- Positions: Striker; left winger

Youth career
- Roskilde

Senior career*
Years	Team	Apps	(Gls)
1997–2003	Brøndby	110	(38)
2003	→ VfL Wolfsburg (loan)	4	(0)
2003–2005	VfL Bochum	51	(19)
2005–2007	1. FC Köln	21	(0)
2006	→ Southampton (loan)	9	(2)
2007–2012	Brøndby	50	(5)
2011–2012	→ Lyngby (loan)	30	(3)
Total		275	(67)

International career
1993	Denmark U17	4	(0)
1995–1996	Denmark U19	6	(2)
1997–1999	Denmark U21	25	(7)
2001–2005	Denmark	13	(3)
- * Club domestic league appearances and goals

Peter Planch Madsen (born 26 April 1978) is a Danish former professional footballer who played as a striker.

He began and ended his career with Brøndby IF, winning the Danish Superliga three times and finishing as its joint top scorer in 2001–02. Abroad, he totalled 63 games and 18 goals in Germany's Bundesliga for VfL Wolfsburg, VfL Bochum and 1. FC Köln, and had a brief loan to England's Southampton in 2006.

Madsen played 13 games and scored three goals for the Denmark national team between 2001 and 2005. He was part of their squads at the 2002 FIFA World Cup and UEFA Euro 2004.

== Club career ==
Born in Roskilde, Madsen started playing as a junior for Roskilde B 06, before he moved on to the youth team of Brøndby IF. He played 35 matches and scored nine goals for various Danish national youth teams from 1993 to 1999. He made his senior debut for Brøndby in April 1997, and went on to win three Danish Superliga championships and the 1998 Danish Cup in his six years with the club. He finished the 2001–02 season as joint league top scorer with Kaspar Dalgas.

Madsen was loaned to German team VfL Wolfsburg in January 2003, playing in the top-flight Bundesliga championship. A part of the loan contract was a June 2003 transfer deal worth 15 million DKK, but as Wolfsburg eventually rejected the transfer, Madsen ended up joining VfL Bochum of the same league in the summer 2003. In his first season with Bochum, Madsen scored 13 league goals.

As Bochum were relegated following the 2004–05 season, Madsen moved on to 1. FC Köln in July 2005. On 30 January 2006, he signed a loan deal with English Championship club Southampton, lasting until the end of the 2005–06 season. He scored twice in his nine league games before returning to Köln, who had then been relegated to the 2. Bundesliga. He played 13 games for Köln in that league before leaving the club. In May 2007, he agreed a move back to Brøndby IF, signing a five-year contract effective from 1 July.

== International career ==
Madsen made his debut for the Denmark national team on 6 October 2001, in a 2002 FIFA World Cup qualifier at home to Iceland. He came on in the 69th minute as a substitute for Ebbe Sand. Morten Olsen named him for the 23-man squad at the final tournament in South Korea and Japan, where he was unused in a run to the last 16.

Olsen also called up Madsen to play at UEFA Euro 2004 in Portugal. He made his one tournament appearance in the 3–0 quarter-final loss to the Czech Republic, replacing Claus Jensen for the last 19 minutes at the Estádio do Dragão.

Capped 13 times, Madsen scored his only international goals on 18 August 2004 with a hat-trick in a 5–1 friendly win away to Poland in Poznań.

== Personal life ==
In March 2020, Madsen tested positive for SARS-CoV-2 early during the pandemic of the disease. He had been infected at a birthday party in Amsterdam, which he attended with former teammates Christian Poulsen and Thomas Kahlenberg. He was tested after Kahlenberg had been tested positive. Madsen's only symptom was a slight headache and he was placed in home quarantine.

== Career statistics ==
=== Club ===
Appearances and goals by club, season and competition
Club	Season	League			National Cup		League Cup		Continental		Total	
Club	Season	Division	Apps	Goals	Apps	Goals	Apps	Goals	Apps	Goals	Apps	Goals
Brøndby	1996–97	Danish Superliga	8	2	0	0	–		0	0	8	2
Brøndby	1997–98	Danish Superliga	5	0	1	1	–		0	0	6	1
Brøndby	1998–99	Danish Superliga	18	3	0	0	–		0	0	18	3
Brøndby	1999–00	Danish Superliga	28	7	1	1	–		0	0	29	8
Brøndby	2000–01	Danish Superliga	5	0	0	0	–		2	1	7	1
Brøndby	2001–02	Danish Superliga	31	22	1	0	–		7	1	39	23
Brøndby	2002–03	Danish Superliga	15	4	1	1	–		5	2	21	7
Brøndby	Total		110	38	4	3	0	0	14	4	128	45
VfL Wolfsburg (loan)	2002–03	Bundesliga	4	0	0	0	0	0	0	0	4	0
VfL Bochum	2003–04	Bundesliga	32	13	1	0	0	0	0	0	33	13
VfL Bochum	2004–05	Bundesliga	19	5	1	2	1	0	0	0	21	7
VfL Bochum	Total		51	18	2	2	1	0	0	0	54	20
1. FC Köln	2005–06	Bundesliga	8	0	1	0	0	0	0	0	9	0
1. FC Köln	2006–07	2. Bundesliga	13	0	2	1	0	0	0	0	15	1
1. FC Köln	Total		21	0	3	1	0	0	0	0	24	1
Southampton (loan)	2005–06	Championship	9	2	1	0	0	0	0	0	10	2
Brøndby	2007–08	Danish Superliga	13	1	3	2	–		0	0	16	3
Brøndby	2008–09	Danish Superliga	16	1	4	3	–		5	2	25	6
Brøndby	2009–10	Danish Superliga	19	3	2	0	–		4	1	25	4
Brøndby	2010–11	Danish Superliga	2	0	0	0	–		5	0	7	0
Brøndby	Total		50	5	9	5	0	0	14	3	73	13
Lyngby (loan)	2010–11	Danish Superliga	15	3	1	0	–		0	0	16	3
Lyngby (loan)	2011–12	Danish Superliga	15	0			–		0	0	15	0
Lyngby (loan)	Total		30	3	1	0	0	0	0	0	30	3
Career total			275	66	20	11	1	0	28	7	324	84

=== International ===
Appearances and goals by national team and year
National team	Year	Apps	Goals
Denmark	2001	2	0
Denmark	2002	3	0
Denmark	2003	1	0
Denmark	2004	6	3
Denmark	2005	1	0
Total		13	3

Scores and results list Denmark's goal tally first, score column indicates score after each Madsen goal.

List of international goals scored by Peter Madsen
No.	Date	Venue	Opponent	Score	Result	Competition
1	18 August 2004	Stadion Miejski, Poznań, Poland	Poland	1–0	5–1	Friendly
2	18 August 2004	Stadion Miejski, Poznań, Poland	Poland	2–0	5–1	Friendly
3	18 August 2004	Stadion Miejski, Poznań, Poland	Poland	5–1	5–1	Friendly

== Honours ==
Brondby

- Danish Superliga: 1996–97, 1997–98, 2001–02
- Danish Cup: 1997–98

Individual

- Danish Superliga top scorer: 2001–02 (22 goals)
