= Anton Vriesde =

Dutch footballer

Personal information
- Date of birth: 18 October 1968 (age 58)
- Place of birth: The Hague, Netherlands
- Height: 1.88 m (6 ft 2 in)
- Position: Defender

Senior career*
Years	Team	Apps	(Gls)
1990–1991	FC Den Haag	27	(3)
1991–1995	ADO Den Haag	56	(3)
1995–2001	MVV	117	(8)
2001–2002	KFC Uerdingen	33	(2)
2002–2004	VfL Bochum	27	(0)
2004–2005	Helmond Sport	22	(1)
- * Club domestic league appearances and goals

Anton Vriesde (born 18 October 1968) is a retired Dutch footballer. A defender, he played for several clubs in the Netherlands, and for KFC Uerdingen and VfL Bochum in Germany.

== Career statistics ==
Season	Club	League			Cup		Total	
Season	Club	Division	Apps	Goals	Apps	Goals	Apps	Goals
Netherlands			League		KNVB Cup		Total	
1990–91	FC Den Haag	Eredivisie	27	3				
1991–92	ADO Den Haag	Eredivisie	20	0				
1992–93	ADO Den Haag	Eerste Divisie	2	0				
1993–94	ADO Den Haag	Eerste Divisie	19	3				
1994–95	ADO Den Haag	Eerste Divisie	15	0				
1995–96	MVV	Eerste Divisie	26	0				
1996–97	MVV	Eerste Divisie	31	4				
1997–98	MVV	Eredivisie	7	0				
1998–99	MVV	Eredivisie	26	3				
1999–00	MVV	Eredivisie	5	0				
2000–01	MVV	Eerste Divisie	22	1				
Germany			League		DFB-Pokal		Total	
2001–02	KFC Uerdingen	Regionalliga Nord	33	2	3	1	36	3
2002–03	VfL Bochum	Bundesliga	17	0	2	0	19	0
2003–04	VfL Bochum	Bundesliga	10	0	0	0	10	0
Netherlands			League		KNVB Cup		Total	
2004–05	Helmond Sport	Eerste Divisie	22	1				
Total	Netherlands		222	15				
Total	Germany		60	2	5	1	65	3
Career total			282	17				
