= 2006–07 VfL Bochum season =

VfL Bochum
2006–07 season
- Chairman: Werner Altegoer
- Head Coach: Marcel Koller
- Stadium: rewirpowerSTADION
- Bundesliga: 8th
- DFB-Pokal: Third round
- Top goalscorer: League: Gekas (20); All: Gekas (22)
- Highest home attendance: 31,328 (vs Bayern Munich, 20 August 2006; vs Werder Bremen, 14 October 2006; vs Schalke 04, 27 April 2007; vs VfB Stuttgart, 12 May 2007)
- Lowest home attendance: 18,110 (vs 1. FC Nürnberg, 11 February 2007)
- Average home league attendance: 24,969
| Home colours | Away colours | Third colours |

The 2006–07 VfL Bochum season was the 69th season in club history.

== Matches ==
=== Legend ===
Win Draw Loss

=== Bundesliga ===
| 12 August 2006 1 | Mainz 05 | 2–1 | VfL Bochum | Mainz |
| 15:30 | Damm 29'; Azaouagh 71' (pen.) | | Zdebel 86' | Stadium: Stadion am Bruchweg; Attendance: 20,000; Referee: Michael Weiner (Giesen) |

| 20 August 2006 2 | VfL Bochum | 1–2 | Bayern Munich | Bochum |
| 17:00 | Fábio Júnior 52' | | Makaay 42'; Lahm 65' | Stadium: rewirpowerSTADION; Attendance: 31,328; Referee: Babak Rafati (Hannover) |

| 26 August 2006 3 | VfL Bochum | 0–1 | Energie Cottbus | Bochum |
| 15:30 | | | Silva 85' | Stadium: rewirpowerSTADION; Attendance: 21,666; Referee: Michael Kempter (Sauldorf) |

| 16 September 2006 4 | 1. FC Nürnberg | 1–1 | VfL Bochum | Nuremberg |
| 15:30 | Polák 30' | | Gekas 10' | Stadium: easyCredit-Stadion; Attendance: 40,240; Referee: Manuel Gräfe (Berlin) |

| 24 September 2006 5 | VfL Bochum | 2–1 | Arminia Bielefeld | Bochum |
| 17:00 | Fábio Júnior 58'; Iličević 73' | | Gabriel 11' | Stadium: rewirpowerSTADION; Attendance: 20,318; Referee: Günter Perl (Pullach) |

| 30 September 2006 6 | Alemannia Aachen | 2–1 | VfL Bochum | Aachen |
| 15:30 | Schlaudraff 48'; Rösler 49' | | Misimović 36' | Stadium: Tivoli; Attendance: 20,300; Referee: Lutz Wagner (Kriftel) |

| 14 October 2006 7 | VfL Bochum | 0–6 | Werder Bremen | Bochum |
| 15:30 | | | Hunt 7'; Schulz 60'; Vranješ 75'; Diego 77'; Fritz 88'; Naldo 90' | Stadium: rewirpowerSTADION; Attendance: 31,328; Referee: Michael Weiner (Giesen) |

| 20 October 2006 8 | Borussia Dortmund | 1–1 | VfL Bochum | Dortmund |
| 20:30 | Smolarek 35' | | Gekas 31' | Stadium: Signal Iduna Park; Attendance: 75,100; Referee: Peter Sippel (Munich) |

| 28 October 2006 9 | VfL Bochum | 0–1 | VfL Wolfsburg | Bochum |
| 15:30 | | | Hanke 25' | Stadium: rewirpowerSTADION; Attendance: 18,650; Referee: Helmut Fleischer (Ulm) |

| 3 November 2006 10 | Hannover 96 | 0–2 | VfL Bochum | Hannover |
| 20:30 | | | Drsek 4'; Gekas 76' | Stadium: AWD-Arena; Attendance: 30,042; Referee: Markus Schmidt (Stuttgart) |

| 8 November 2006 11 | VfL Bochum | 1–3 | Bayer Leverkusen | Bochum |
| 20:00 | Iličević 48' | | Barbarez 7'; Voronin 32'; Barnetta 71' | Stadium: rewirpowerSTADION; Attendance: 18,469; Referee: Lutz Wagner (Kriftel) |

| 11 November 2006 12 | Hertha BSC | 3–3 | VfL Bochum | Berlin |
| 15:30 | Pantelić 9'; Van Burik 58'; Neuendorf 80' | | Gekas 39'; Misimović 45+1', 47' | Stadium: Olympiastadion; Attendance: 29,104; Referee: Felix Brych (Munich) |

| 17 November 2006 13 | VfL Bochum | 4–3 | Eintracht Frankfurt | Bochum |
| 20:30 | Misimović 29' (pen.); Maltritz 33'; Butscher 36'; Gekas 46' | | Streit 1', 5'; Amanatidis 56' | Stadium: rewirpowerSTADION; Attendance: 21,260; Referee: Peter Gagelmann (Bremen) |

| 24 November 2006 14 | Schalke 04 | 2–1 | VfL Bochum | Gelsenkirchen |
| 20:30 | Rafinha 19'; Løvenkrands 27' | | Gekas 49' | Stadium: Veltins-Arena; Attendance: 61,482; Referee: Manuel Gräfe (Berlin) |

| 2 December 2006 15 | VfL Bochum | 2–1 | Hamburger SV | Bochum |
| 15:30 | Dabrowski 5'; Misimović 70' | | Ljuboja 42' | Stadium: rewirpowerSTADION; Attendance: 25,715; Referee: Wolfgang Stark (Ergolding) |

| 9 December 2006 16 | VfB Stuttgart | 1–0 | VfL Bochum | Stuttgart |
| 15:30 | Streller 87' | | | Stadium: Gottlieb-Daimler-Stadion; Attendance: 48,000; Referee: Markus Merk (Otterbach) |

| 15 December 2006 17 | VfL Bochum | 2–0 | Borussia Mönchengladbach | Bochum |
| 20:30 | Gekas 45+1'; Kahê 85' (o.g.) | | | Stadium: rewirpowerSTADION; Attendance: 30,500; Referee: Günter Perl (Pullach) |

| 27 January 2007 18 | VfL Bochum | 0–1 | Mainz 05 | Bochum |
| 15:30 | | | Rose 38' | Stadium: rewirpowerSTADION; Attendance: 20,487; Referee: Florian Meyer (Burgdorf) |

| 30 January 2007 19 | Bayern Munich | 0–0 | VfL Bochum | Munich |
| 20:00 | | | | Stadium: Allianz Arena; Attendance: 64,000; Referee: Jochen Drees (Münster-Sarmsheim) |

| 3 February 2007 20 | Energie Cottbus | 0–0 | VfL Bochum | Cottbus |
| 15:30 | | | | Stadium: Stadion der Freundschaft; Attendance: 11,650; Referee: Wolfgang Stark (Ergolding) |

| 11 February 2007 21 | VfL Bochum | 0–2 | 1. FC Nürnberg | Bochum |
| 17:00 | | | Saenko 88', 90+1' | Stadium: rewirpowerSTADION; Attendance: 18,110; Referee: Knut Kircher (Rottenburg) |

| 18 February 2007 22 | Arminia Bielefeld | 1–3 | VfL Bochum | Bielefeld |
| 17:00 | Wichniarek 26' | | Gekas 2', 10'; Dabrowski 51' | Stadium: Schüco-Arena; Attendance: 21,025; Referee: Felix Brych (Munich) |

| 24 February 2007 23 | VfL Bochum | 2–2 | Alemannia Aachen | Bochum |
| 15:30 | Gekas 25'; Epalle 53' | | Ibišević 35'; Lehmann 59' | Stadium: rewirpowerSTADION; Attendance: 21,350; Referee: Peter Sippel (Munich) |

| 3 March 2007 24 | Werder Bremen | 3–0 | VfL Bochum | Bremen |
| 15:30 | Hunt 25', 73', 76' | | | Stadium: Weserstadion; Attendance: 40,156; Referee: Lutz Wagner (Kriftel) |

| 10 March 2007 25 | VfL Bochum | 2–0 | Borussia Dortmund | Bochum |
| 15:30 | Gekas 48', 83' | | | Stadium: rewirpowerSTADION; Attendance: 31,278; Referee: Manuel Gräfe (Berlin) |

| 17 March 2007 26 | VfL Wolfsburg | 3–1 | VfL Bochum | Wolfsburg |
| 15:30 | Boakye 21'; Madlung 26'; Marcelinho 83' | | Gekas 66' | Stadium: Volkswagen-Arena; Attendance: 15,743; Referee: Markus Merk (Otterbach) |

| 1 April 2007 27 | VfL Bochum | 2–0 | Hannover 96 | Bochum |
| 17:00 | Gekas 35'; Epalle 42' | | | Stadium: rewirpowerSTADION; Attendance: 24,177; Referee: Helmut Fleischer (Ulm) |

| 8 April 2007 28 | Bayer Leverkusen | 1–4 | VfL Bochum | Leverkusen |
| 17:00 | Kießling 62' | | Haggui 8' (o.g.); Yahia 16'; Gekas 22', 90' | Stadium: BayArena; Attendance: 22,500; Referee: Peter Gagelmann (Bremen) |

| 14 April 2007 29 | VfL Bochum | 1–3 | Hertha BSC | Bochum |
| 15:30 | Gekas 1' | | Giménez 58'; Gilberto 66'; Ede 90' | Stadium: rewirpowerSTADION; Attendance: 27,181; Referee: Günter Perl (Pullach) |

| 21 April 2007 30 | Eintracht Frankfurt | 0–3 | VfL Bochum | Frankfurt am Main |
| 15:30 | | | Gekas 32'; Epalle 58', 69' | Stadium: Commerzbank Arena; Attendance: 47,962; Referee: Babak Rafati (Hannover) |

| 27 April 2007 31 | VfL Bochum | 2–1 | Schalke 04 | Bochum |
| 20:30 | Misimović 33'; Gekas 41' | | Kurányi 8' | Stadium: rewirpowerSTADION; Attendance: 31,328; Referee: Knut Kircher (Rottenburg) |

| 5 May 2007 32 | Hamburger SV | 0–3 | VfL Bochum | Hamburg |
| 15:30 | | | Gekas 61'; Grote 66'; Misimović 80' (pen.) | Stadium: AOL Arena; Attendance: 57,000; Referee: Felix Brych (Munich) |

| 12 May 2007 33 | VfL Bochum | 2–3 | VfB Stuttgart | Bochum |
| 15:30 | Schröder 4'; Maltritz 42' | | Hitzlsperger 24'; Gómez 62'; Cacau 73' | Stadium: rewirpowerSTADION; Attendance: 31,328; Referee: Florian Meyer (Burgdorf) |

| 19 May 2007 34 | Borussia Mönchengladbach | 0–2 | VfL Bochum | Mönchengladbach |
| 15:30 | | | Dabrowski 24'; Wosz 82' | Stadium: Borussia-Park; Attendance: 50,001; Referee: Markus Merk (Otterbach) |

=== DFB-Pokal ===
| 9 September 2006 R1 | FC 08 Homburg | 1–2 | VfL Bochum | Homburg |
| 18:30 | Petri 85' | | Misimović 19' (pen.); Gekas 51' | Stadium: Waldstadion; Attendance: 6,375; Referee: Thomas Frank (Hannover) |

| 24 October 2006 R2 | VfL Bochum | 3–2 | Karlsruher SC | Bochum |
| 19:30 | Gekas 26'; Butscher 29', 87' | | Porcello 44', 62' | Stadium: rewirpowerSTADION; Attendance: 10,480; Referee: Franz-Xaver Wack (Biberbach) |

| 19 December 2006 R3 | VfL Bochum | 1–4 | VfB Stuttgart | Bochum |
| 19:30 | Bechmann 85' | | Gómez 34'; Hitzlsperger 49', 58'; Cacau 90' | Stadium: rewirpowerSTADION; Attendance: 18,650; Referee: Peter Sippel (Munich) |

== Squad ==
=== Squad and statistics ===
==== Squad, appearances and goals scored ====
| No. | Pos | Nat | Player | Total | | Bundesliga | | DFB-Pokal | |
| No. | Pos | Nat | Player | Apps | Goals | Apps | Goals | Apps | Goals |
|---|---|---|---|---|---|---|---|---|---|
| 1 | GK | (Denmark) DEN | Peter Skov-Jensen | 13 | 0 | 12 | 0 | 1 | 0 |
| 2 | DF | (Germany) GER | Benjamin Lense | 9 | 0 | 8 | 0 | 1 | 0 |
| 3 | DF | (Germany) GER | Martin Meichelbeck | 11 | 0 | 9 | 0 | 2 | 0 |
| 4 | DF | (Germany) GER | Marcel Maltritz | 34 | 2 | 31 | 2 | 3 | 0 |
| 5 | MF | (Germany) GER | Christoph Dabrowski | 34 | 3 | 31 | 3 | 3 | 0 |
| 6 | MF | (Canada) CAN | Daniel Imhof | 7 | 0 | 7 | 0 | 0 | 0 |
| 7 | MF | (Denmark) DEN | Tommy Bechmann | 12 | 1 | 11 | 0 | 1 | 1 |
| 8 | MF | (Poland) POL | Tomasz Zdebel | 34 | 1 | 32 | 1 | 2 | 0 |
| 9 | FW | (Brazil) BRA | Fábio Júnior Pereira | 18 | 2 | 16 | 2 | 2 | 0 |
| 10 | MF | (Germany) GER | Dariusz Wosz | 1 | 1 | 1 | 1 | 0 | 0 |
| 11 | MF | (Belgium) BEL | Joris Van Hout | 15 | 0 | 14 | 0 | 1 | 0 |
| 13 | GK | (Germany) GER | René Renno | 0 | 0 | 0 | 0 | 0 | 0 |
| 14 | MF | (Croatia) CRO | Ivo Iličević | 20 | 2 | 19 | 2 | 1 | 0 |
| 15 | DF | (Czech Republic) CZE | Pavel Drsek | 30 | 1 | 27 | 1 | 3 | 0 |
| 16 | MF | (Bosnia and Herzegovina) BIH | Zvjezdan Misimović | 32 | 8 | 30 | 7 | 2 | 1 |
| 17 | DF | (Germany) GER | Heiko Butscher | 22 | 3 | 20 | 1 | 2 | 2 |
| 18 | MF | (Germany) GER | Oliver Schröder | 31 | 1 | 28 | 1 | 3 | 0 |
| 19 | MF | (Germany) GER | Dennis Grote | 17 | 1 | 16 | 1 | 1 | 0 |
| 20 | FW | (Germany) GER | Benjamin Auer (until 31 December 2006) | 3 | 0 | 2 | 0 | 1 | 0 |
| 20 | MF | (Cameroon) CMR | Joël Epalle (since 1 January 2007) | 17 | 4 | 17 | 4 | 0 | 0 |
| 21 | FW | (Czech Republic) CZE | Filip Trojan | 29 | 0 | 26 | 0 | 3 | 0 |
| 22 | FW | (Greece) GRE | Theofanis Gekas | 35 | 22 | 32 | 20 | 3 | 2 |
| 23 | MF | (Germany) GER | Ersan Tekkan | 0 | 0 | 0 | 0 | 0 | 0 |
| 24 | DF | (Germany) GER | Philipp Bönig | 33 | 0 | 30 | 0 | 3 | 0 |
| 25 | FW | (Germany) GER | Thomas Rathgeber (until 31 December 2006) | 2 | 0 | 1 | 0 | 1 | 0 |
| 25 | DF | (Algeria) ALG | Antar Yahia (since 29 January 2007) | 16 | 1 | 16 | 1 | 0 | 0 |
| 26 | GK | (Germany) GER | Alexander Bade | 7 | 0 | 5 | 0 | 2 | 0 |
| 27 | DF | (Germany) GER | David Czyszczon | 0 | 0 | 0 | 0 | 0 | 0 |
| 28 | MF | (Germany) GER | Lucas Oppermann | 0 | 0 | 0 | 0 | 0 | 0 |
| 29 | MF | (Germany) GER | Sebastian Hille | 1 | 0 | 1 | 0 | 0 | 0 |
| 31 | GK | (Germany) GER | Andreas Luthe | 0 | 0 | 0 | 0 | 0 | 0 |
| 32 | MF | (Germany) GER | David Zajas | 0 | 0 | 0 | 0 | 0 | 0 |
| 33 | GK | (Turkey) TUR | Polat Keser (until 31 December 2006) | 0 | 0 | 0 | 0 | 0 | 0 |
| 36 | DF | (Switzerland) SUI | David Pallas | 9 | 0 | 8 | 0 | 1 | 0 |
| 45 | GK | (Czech Republic) CZE | Jaroslav Drobný (since 22 January 2007) | 17 | 0 | 17 | 0 | 0 | 0 |

=== Transfers ===
==== Summer ====
In:

| No. | Pos. | Nation | Player |
|---|---|---|---|
| 2 | DF | GER | Benjamin Lense (from 1. FC Nürnberg) |
| 5 | MF | GER | Christoph Dabrowski (from Hannover 96) |
| 14 | MF | CRO | Ivo Iličević (from Darmstadt 98) |
| 18 | MF | GER | Oliver Schröder (from Hertha BSC) |
| 20 | FW | GER | Benjamin Auer (from Mainz 05) |
| 22 | FW | GRE | Theofanis Gekas (on loan from Panathinaikos) |
| 26 | GK | GER | Alexander Bade (from 1. FC Köln) |
| 31 | GK | GER | Andreas Luthe (from VfL Bochum II) |

Out:

| No. | Pos. | Nation | Player |
|---|---|---|---|
| 1 | GK | NED | Rein van Duijnhoven (retired) |
| 2 | DF | BRA | China (loan return to Flamengo) |
| 5 | DF | DEN | Søren Colding (retired) |
| 22 | FW | BRA | Edu (to Mainz 05) |
| 26 | MF | GER | Claus Costa (to Fortuna Düsseldorf) |
| 27 | FW | GER | Alexander Thamm (to Preußen Münster) |
| 28 | DF | GER | Thorsten Barg (to Karlsruher SC II) |
| 29 | FW | TUR | Haluk Türkeri (to Karlsruher SC II) |
| 31 | GK | GER | Christian Vander (to Werder Bremen) |

==== Winter ====
In:

| No. | Pos. | Nation | Player |
|---|---|---|---|
| 20 | MF | CMR | Joël Epalle (from Iraklis) |
| 25 | DF | ALG | Antar Yahia (on loan from Nice) |
| 45 | GK | CZE | Jaroslav Drobný (on loan from Ipswich Town) |

Out:

| No. | Pos. | Nation | Player |
|---|---|---|---|
| 20 | FW | GER | Benjamin Auer (on loan to 1. FC Kaiserslautern) |
| 25 | FW | GER | Thomas Rathgeber (to SpVgg Unterhaching) |
| 33 | GK | TUR | Polat Keser (to Antalyaspor) |

== VfL Bochum II ==
| No. | Pos | Nat | Player | Total | | Oberliga Westfalen | |
| No. | Pos | Nat | Player | Apps | Goals | Apps | Goals |
|---|---|---|---|---|---|---|---|
| | DF | (Germany) GER | David Czyszczon | 34 | 3 | 34 | 3 |
| | DF | (Germany) GER | Patrick Fabian | 29 | 0 | 29 | 0 |
| | MF | (Germany) GER | Dennis Grote | 6 | 0 | 6 | 0 |
| | FW | (Turkey) TUR | Dilaver Güçlü | 24 | 7 | 24 | 7 |
| | FW | (Turkey) TUR | Faruk Gül | 2 | 0 | 2 | 0 |
| | FW | (Germany) GER | Sebastian Herrmann | 1 | 0 | 1 | 0 |
| | FW | (Germany) GER | Sebastian Hille | 33 | 18 | 33 | 18 |
| | MF | (Croatia) CRO | Ivo Iličević | 8 | 5 | 8 | 5 |
| | FW | (Luxembourg) LUX | Aurélien Joachim (until 30 January 2007) | 4 | 0 | 4 | 0 |
| | GK | (Turkey) TUR | Polat Keser (until 31 December 2006) | 0 | 0 | 0 | 0 |
| | MF | (Germany) GER | Dennis Kirchen | 11 | 0 | 11 | 0 |
| | DF | (Germany) GER | Daniel Klinger | 24 | 1 | 24 | 1 |
| | DF | (Germany) GER | Dennis Klöckner | 15 | 0 | 15 | 0 |
| | DF | (Germany) GER | Hendrik Könemann | 12 | 1 | 12 | 1 |
| | FW | (Germany) GER | Stefan Kratofiel | 21 | 9 | 21 | 9 |
| | GK | (Germany) GER | Andreas Luthe | 34 | 0 | 34 | 0 |
| | MF | (Germany) GER | Martin Lyttek | 30 | 2 | 30 | 2 |
| | DF | (Germany) GER | Marc-Andre Nimptsch | 30 | 1 | 30 | 1 |
| | FW | (Germany) GER | Marko Onucka | 3 | 0 | 3 | 0 |
| | MF | (Germany) GER | Lucas Oppermann | 22 | 2 | 22 | 2 |
| | MF | (Switzerland) SUI | David Pallas | 1 | 0 | 1 | 0 |
| | FW | (Germany) GER | Thomas Rathgeber | 8 | 3 | 8 | 3 |
| | MF | (Germany) GER | Christian Schlösser | 10 | 0 | 10 | 0 |
| | GK | (Germany) GER | Niclas Schmidt | 0 | 0 | 0 | 0 |
| | MF | (Germany) GER | Ersan Tekkan | 5 | 2 | 5 | 2 |
| | MF | (Germany) GER | Deran Toksöz | 1 | 0 | 1 | 0 |
| | FW | (Turkey) TUR | Suri Ucar | 26 | 5 | 26 | 5 |
| | MF | (Germany) GER | Dennis Yilmaz | 23 | 1 | 23 | 1 |
| | MF | (Germany) GER | David Zajas | 32 | 0 | 32 | 0 |
| | FW | (Germany) GER | Patrick Ziegler | 18 | 0 | 18 | 0 |
