= 2005–06 VfL Bochum season =

VfL Bochum
2005–06 season
- Chairman: Werner Altegoer
- Head Coach: Marcel Koller
- Stadium: Ruhrstadion
- 2. Bundesliga: 1st (promoted)
- DFB-Pokal: Second Round
- Top goalscorer: League: Edu (12); All: Edu (13)
- Highest home attendance: 25,374 (vs Karlsruher SC, 7 May 2006)
- Lowest home attendance: 11,773 (vs SpVgg Unterhaching, 16 December 2005)
- Average home league attendance: 18,321
Home colours	Away colours	Third colours

The 2005–06 VfL Bochum season was the 68th season in club history.

== Matches ==
=== Legend ===
Win Draw Loss

=== 2. Bundesliga ===
6 August 2005 1	1. FC Saarbrücken	0–4	VfL Bochum	Saarbrücken
13:00			Edu 51', 64'; Misimović 78', 90'	Stadium: Ludwigsparkstadion; Attendance: 15,500; Referee: Markus Schmidt (Stuttgart)

15 August 2005 2	VfL Bochum	2–2	FC Energie Cottbus	Bochum
20:15	Edu 30'; Drsek 59'		Kioyo 9', 90+2'	Stadium: Ruhrstadion; Attendance: 19,866; Referee: Florian Meyer (Burgdorf)

26 August 2005 3	LR Ahlen	2–2	VfL Bochum	Ahlen
19:00	Paulinho 6'; Thioune 28'		Wosz 8'; Edu 61'	Stadium: Wersestadion; Attendance: 7,500; Referee: Babak Rafati (Hannover)

12 September 2005 4	VfL Bochum	1–0	FC Hansa Rostock	Bochum
20:15	Meichelbeck 90+3'			Stadium: Ruhrstadion; Attendance: 15,893; Referee: Franz-Xaver Wack (Biberbach)

16 September 2005 5	SpVgg Greuther Fürth	1–3	VfL Bochum	Fürth
19:00	Fuchs 19'		Edu 12', 66'; Van Hout 43'	Stadium: Playmobil-Stadion; Attendance: 5,800; Referee: Tobias Welz (Wiesbaden)

20 September 2005 6	VfL Bochum	1–0	Dynamo Dresden	Bochum
17:30	Drsek 87'			Stadium: Ruhrstadion; Attendance: 17,567; Referee: Thomas Frank (Hannover)

23 September 2005 7	Kickers Offenbach	0–0	VfL Bochum	Offenbach
19:00				Stadium: Stadion am Bieberer Berg; Attendance: 11,423; Referee: Wolfgang Walz (Pfedelbach)

3 October 2005 8	VfL Bochum	1–0	TSV 1860 Munich	Bochum
20:15	Maltritz 88'			Stadium: Ruhrstadion; Attendance: 23,606; Referee: Michael Weiner (Giesen)

16 October 2005 9	Eintracht Braunschweig	0–0	VfL Bochum	Braunschweig
15:00				Stadium: Eintracht-Stadion; Attendance: 22,100; Referee: Günter Perl (Pullach)

21 October 2005 10	VfL Bochum	4–0	SC Freiburg	Bochum
19:00	Van Hout 14'; Baltes 45' (o.g.); Misimović 48'; Imhof 75'			Stadium: Ruhrstadion; Attendance: 17,132; Referee: Helmut Fleischer (Ulm)

28 October 2005 11	VfL Bochum	1–1	SC Paderborn 07	Bochum
19:00	Müller 18' (o.g.)		Ndjeng 83'	Stadium: Ruhrstadion; Attendance: 21,077; Referee: Georg Schalk (Augsburg)

6 November 2005 12	Sportfreunde Siegen	3–0	VfL Bochum	Siegen
15:00	Bettenstaedt 32', 51'; Bogusz 49'			Stadium: Leimbachstadion; Attendance: 17,745; Referee: Christian Dingert (Lebecksmühle)

18 November 2005 13	VfL Bochum	1–4	Alemannia Aachen	Bochum
19:00	Imhof 69'		Meijer 2'; Reghecampf 16'; Plaßhenrich 50'; Schlaudraff 85'	Stadium: Ruhrstadion; Attendance: 21,057; Referee: Manuel Gräfe (Berlin)

25 November 2005 14	SV Wacker Burghausen	0–4	VfL Bochum	Burghausen
19:00			Meichelbeck 6'; Van Hout 23', 40'; Edu 60'	Stadium: Wacker-Arena; Attendance: 4,030; Referee: Knut Kircher (Rottenburg)

4 December 2005 15	VfL Bochum	1–0	FC Erzgebirge Aue	Bochum
15:00	Van Hout 74'			Stadium: Ruhrstadion; Attendance: 15,068; Referee: Peter Gagelmann (Bremen)

11 December 2005 16	Karlsruher SC	4–2	VfL Bochum	Karlsruhe
15:00	Rothenbach 39'; Masmanidis 59'; Federico 68', 79'		Trojan 30'; Diabang 84'	Stadium: Wildparkstadion; Attendance: 15,700; Referee: Jochen Drees (Münster-Sarmsheim)

16 December 2005 17	VfL Bochum	1–0	SpVgg Unterhaching	Bochum
19:00	Grote 88'			Stadium: Ruhrstadion; Attendance: 11,773; Referee: Matthias Anklam (Buchholz)

22 January 2006 18	VfL Bochum	3–0	1. FC Saarbrücken	Bochum
15:00	Imhof 21'; Edu 47' (pen.); Maltritz 79' (pen.)			Stadium: Ruhrstadion; Attendance: 15,177; Referee: Wolfgang Stark (Ergolding)

29 January 2006 19	FC Energie Cottbus	0–1	VfL Bochum	Cottbus
15:00			Fábio Júnior 76'	Stadium: Stadion der Freundschaft; Attendance: 7,525; Referee: Lutz Wagner (Kriftel)

3 February 2006 20	VfL Bochum	3–0	LR Ahlen	Bochum
19:00	Bechmann 36', 69'; Edu 78' (pen.)			Stadium: Ruhrstadion; Attendance: 14,286; Referee: Thorsten Schriever (Wurster Nordseeküste)

13 February 2006 21	FC Hansa Rostock	0–2	VfL Bochum	Rostock
20:15			Bechmann 5'; Meichelbeck 8'	Stadium: Ostseestadion; Attendance: 14,000; Referee: Helmut Fleischer (Ulm)

19 February 2006 22	VfL Bochum	1–1	SpVgg Greuther Fürth	Bochum
15:00	Misimović 44'		Timm 59'	Stadium: Ruhrstadion; Attendance: 17,157; Referee: Michael Kempter (Sauldorf)

26 February 2006 23	Dynamo Dresden	0–0	VfL Bochum	Dresden
15:00				Stadium: Rudolf-Harbig-Stadion; Attendance: 13,153; Referee: Christian Dingert (Lebecksmühle)

3 March 2006 24	VfL Bochum	0–1	Kickers Offenbach	Bochum
19:00			Dorn 46'	Stadium: Ruhrstadion; Attendance: 14,021; Referee: Peter Gagelmann (Bremen)

13 March 2006 25	TSV 1860 Munich	0–1	VfL Bochum	Munich
20:15			Butscher 69'	Stadium: Allianz Arena; Attendance: 27,600; Referee: Florian Meyer (Burgdorf)

19 March 2006 26	VfL Bochum	4–0	Eintracht Braunschweig	Bochum
15:00	Misimović 9', 60'; Edu 28'; Zdebel 67'			Stadium: Ruhrstadion; Attendance: 20,189; Referee: Ralf Brombacher (Kandern)

27 March 2006 27	SC Freiburg	0–0	VfL Bochum	Freiburg
20:15				Stadium: Badenova-Stadion; Attendance: 14,000; Referee: Günter Perl (Pullach)

31 March 2006 28	SC Paderborn 07	1–3	VfL Bochum	Paderborn
19:00	Dragusha 8'		Misimović 54', 77'; Zdebel 61'	Stadium: Hermann Löns Stadium; Attendance: 9,322; Referee: Markus Schmidt (Stuttgart)

7 April 2006 29	VfL Bochum	3–1	Sportfreunde Siegen	Bochum
19:00	Misimović 18' (pen.), 25'; Barletta 48' (o.g.)		Akwuegbu 83'	Stadium: Ruhrstadion; Attendance: 20,298; Referee: Thomas Frank (Hannover)

17 April 2006 30	Alemannia Aachen	0–2	VfL Bochum	Aachen
20:15			Bechmann 13'; Misimović 83'	Stadium: Tivoli; Attendance: 21,632; Referee: Peter Sippel (Munich)

21 April 2006 31	VfL Bochum	1–2	SV Wacker Burghausen	Bochum
19:00	Edu 76' (pen.)		Krejčí 15'; Burkhardt 69'	Stadium: Ruhrstadion; Attendance: 21,921; Referee: Mike Pickel (Mendig)

1 May 2006 32	FC Erzgebirge Aue	0–1	VfL Bochum	Aue
20:15			Czyszczon 78'	Stadium: Erzgebirgsstadion; Attendance: 12,150; Referee: Markus Kuhl (Cologne)

7 May 2006 33	VfL Bochum	2–3	Karlsruher SC	Bochum
15:00	Edu 37'; Van Hout 76'		Kapllani 23'; Dundee 74'; Schwarz 90+1'	Stadium: Ruhrstadion; Attendance: 25,374; Referee: Michael Sahler (Mutterstadt)

14 May 2006 34	SpVgg Unterhaching	0–0	VfL Bochum	Unterhaching
15:00				Stadium: Generali Sportpark; Attendance: 7,000; Referee: Michael Weiner (Giesen)

=== DFB-Pokal ===
20 August 2005 R1	Tennis Borussia Berlin	0–6	VfL Bochum	Berlin
15:30			Drsek 6'; Diabang 19'; Edu 28'; Wosz 63'; Misimović 67'; Meichelbeck 87'	Stadium: Mommsenstadion; Attendance: 1,419; Referee: Stefan Lupp (Zossen)

25 October 2005 R2	FC St. Pauli	4–0	VfL Bochum	Hamburg
19:30	Mazingu-Dinzey 8'; Luz 40'; Lechner 57'; Shubitidze 76'			Stadium: Millerntor-Stadion; Attendance: 13,230; Referee: Michael Kempter (Sauldorf)

== Squad ==
=== Squad and statistics ===
==== Squad, appearances and goals scored ====
No.	Pos	Nat	Player	Total		2. Bundesliga		DFB-Pokal	
No.	Pos	Nat	Player	Apps	Goals	Apps	Goals	Apps	Goals
1	GK	(Netherlands) NED	Rein van Duijnhoven	18	0	16	0	2	0
2	DF	(Brazil) BRA	China	18	0	16	0	2	0
3	DF	(Germany) GER	Martin Meichelbeck	21	4	20	3	1	1
4	DF	(Germany) GER	Marcel Maltritz	30	2	29	2	1	0
5	DF	(Denmark) DEN	Søren Colding	8	0	8	0	0	0
6	MF	(Canada) CAN	Daniel Imhof	35	3	33	3	2	0
7	FW	(Denmark) DEN	Tommy Bechmann	26	4	24	4	2	0
8	MF	(Poland) POL	Tomasz Zdebel	32	2	30	2	2	0
9	FW	(Brazil) BRA	Fábio Júnior Pereira (since 11 January 2006)	15	1	15	1	0	0
10	MF	(Germany) GER	Dariusz Wosz	16	2	15	1	1	1
11	FW	(Belgium) BEL	Joris Van Hout	26	6	25	6	1	0
13	GK	(Germany) GER	René Renno	3	0	3	0	0	0
14	MF	(Iran) IRN	Moharram Navidkia (until 31 December 2005)	12	0	10	0	2	0
15	DF	(Czech Republic) CZE	Pavel Drsek	26	3	24	2	2	1
16	MF	(Bosnia and Herzegovina) BIH	Zvjezdan Misimović	33	12	31	11	2	1
17	DF	(Germany) GER	Heiko Butscher	26	1	24	1	2	0
18	FW	(Senegal) SEN	Mamadou Diabang	11	2	9	1	2	1
19	MF	(Germany) GER	Dennis Grote	9	1	9	1	0	0
20	GK	(Denmark) DEN	Peter Skov-Jensen	15	0	15	0	0	0
21	MF	(Czech Republic) CZE	Filip Trojan	23	1	22	1	1	0
22	FW	(Brazil) BRA	Edu	35	13	33	12	2	1
23	MF	(Germany) GER	Ersan Tekkan	0	0	0	0	0	0
24	DF	(Germany) GER	Philipp Bönig	20	0	19	0	1	0
26	MF	(Germany) GER	Claus Costa	0	0	0	0	0	0
27	FW	(Germany) GER	Alexander Thamm	0	0	0	0	0	0
28	DF	(Germany) GER	Thorsten Barg	0	0	0	0	0	0
29	FW	(Turkey) TUR	Haluk Türkeri	1	0	1	0	0	0
30	MF	(Germany) GER	Lucas Oppermann	0	0	0	0	0	0
31	GK	(Germany) GER	Christian Vander	0	0	0	0	0	0
35	FW	(Romania) ROU	Ionel Gane (until 31 December 2005)	1	0	1	0	0	0
35	FW	(Germany) GER	Thomas Rathgeber (since 1 January 2006)	6	0	6	0	0	0
36	MF	(Switzerland) SUI	David Pallas	24	0	24	0	0	0
37	DF	(Germany) GER	David Czyszczon	5	1	5	1	0	0
39	FW	(Germany) GER	Sebastian Hille	1	0	1	0	0	0

=== Transfers ===
==== Summer ====
In:

No.	Pos.	Nation	Player
2	DF	BRA	China (on loan from Flamengo)
6	MF	CAN	Daniel Imhof (from FC St. Gallen)
11	FW	BEL	Joris Van Hout (from Borussia Mönchengladbach)
13	GK	GER	René Renno (from Rot-Weiss Essen)
15	DF	CZE	Pavel Drsek (from MSV Duisburg)
17	DF	GER	Heiko Butscher (from VfB Stuttgart II)
28	DF	GER	Thorsten Barg (from VfL Bochum U-19)
29	FW	TUR	Haluk Türkeri (from VfL Bochum U-19)
30	MF	GER	Lucas Oppermann (from VfL Bochum II)
35	FW	ROU	Ionel Gane (from FC Rapid București)
36	MF	SUI	David Pallas (from FC Zürich, previously on loan at FC Thun)
37	DF	GER	David Czyszczon (from VfL Bochum II)
39	FW	GER	Sebastian Hille (from VfL Bochum II)

Out:

No.	Pos.	Nation	Player
6	DF	CMR	Raymond Kalla (to Sivasspor)
9	FW	DEN	Peter Madsen (to 1. FC Köln)
11	FW	CZE	Vratislav Lokvenc (to SV Austria Salzburg)
15	DF	SVN	Aleksander Knavs (to SV Austria Salzburg)
17	MF	GER	Christoph Preuß (to Eintracht Frankfurt)
20	MF	SCG	Miroslav Stević (to SpVgg Unterhaching)
25	DF	GER	Marvin Matip (to 1. FC Köln)
29	FW	ITA	Gaetano Manno (to Wuppertaler SV)
30	MF	ITA	Luciano Velardi (to 1. FC Kleve)

==== Winter ====
In:

No.	Pos.	Nation	Player
9	FW	BRA	Fábio Júnior Pereira (from al-Wahda)
35	FW	GER	Thomas Rathgeber (from FC Kempten)

Out:

No.	Pos.	Nation	Player
14	MF	IRN	Moharram Navidkia (to Sepahan F.C.)
35	FW	ROU	Ionel Gane (to FC Universitatea Craiova)

== VfL Bochum II ==
No.	Pos	Nat	Player	Total		Oberliga Westfalen		DFB-Pokal	
No.	Pos	Nat	Player	Apps	Goals	Apps	Goals	Apps	Goals
	DF	(Germany) GER	Thorsten Barg	20	0	19	0	1	0
	DF	(Denmark) DEN	Søren Colding	2	0	2	0	0	0
	MF	(Germany) GER	Claus Costa	32	11	31	11	1	0
	DF	(Germany) GER	David Czyszczon	30	1	29	1	1	0
	FW	(Senegal) SEN	Mamadou Diabang	1	1	1	1	0	0
	DF	(Germany) GER	Patrick Fabian (since 26 April 2006)	2	0	2	0	0	0
	DF	(Germany) GER	Daniel Gordon	31	1	30	1	1	0
	GK	(Germany) GER	Bastian Görrissen	11	0	11	0	0	0
	MF	(Germany) GER	Dennis Grote	13	3	12	2	1	1
	FW	(Turkey) TUR	Dilaver Güçlü	31	7	30	7	1	0
	FW	(Turkey) TUR	Faruk Gül	1	0	1	0	0	0
	FW	(Germany) GER	Sebastian Hille	30	18	29	18	1	0
	MF	(Germany) GER	Sascha Höhle	19	0	18	0	1	0
	FW	(Luxembourg) LUX	Aurélien Joachim (since 1 January 2006)	13	0	13	0	0	0
	GK	(Turkey) TUR	Polat Keser	16	0	16	0	0	0
	DF	(Germany) GER	Daniel Klinger	18	0	18	0	0	0
	DF	(Germany) GER	Hendrik Könemann	19	0	19	0	0	0
	GK	(Germany) GER	Andreas Luthe (since 20 April 2006)	2	0	2	0	0	0
	DF	(Germany) GER	Mirko Mustroph	9	0	8	0	1	0
	DF	(Germany) GER	Marc-Andre Nimptsch	4	0	4	0	0	0
	MF	(Germany) GER	Lucas Oppermann	8	1	8	1	0	0
	FW	(Germany) GER	Thomas Rathgeber (since 1 January 2006)	1	0	1	0	0	0
	GK	(Germany) GER	René Renno	7	0	6	0	1	0
	MF	(Germany) GER	Ersan Tekkan	23	3	23	3	0	0
	FW	(Germany) GER	Alexander Thamm	29	5	28	4	1	1
	FW	(Turkey) TUR	Haluk Türkeri	26	6	26	6	0	0
	FW	(Turkey) TUR	Suri Ucar	30	2	29	2	1	0
	MF	(Germany) GER	Sebastian Westerhoff	16	2	16	2	0	0
	MF	(Germany) GER	Dennis Yilmaz	5	0	5	0	0	0
	MF	(Germany) GER	David Zajas	33	0	32	0	1	0
	MF	(Germany) GER	Fatlum Zaskoku	1	0	1	0	0	0
	FW	(Germany) GER	Fisnik Zejnullahu	1	0	1	0	0	0
