= Türkeri =

Türkeri is a surname. Notable people with the surname include:

- Fevzi Türkeri (born 1941), Turkish general
- Haluk Türkeri (born 1986), Turkish footballer
