= Theofanis Gekas =

Greek footballer (born 1980)

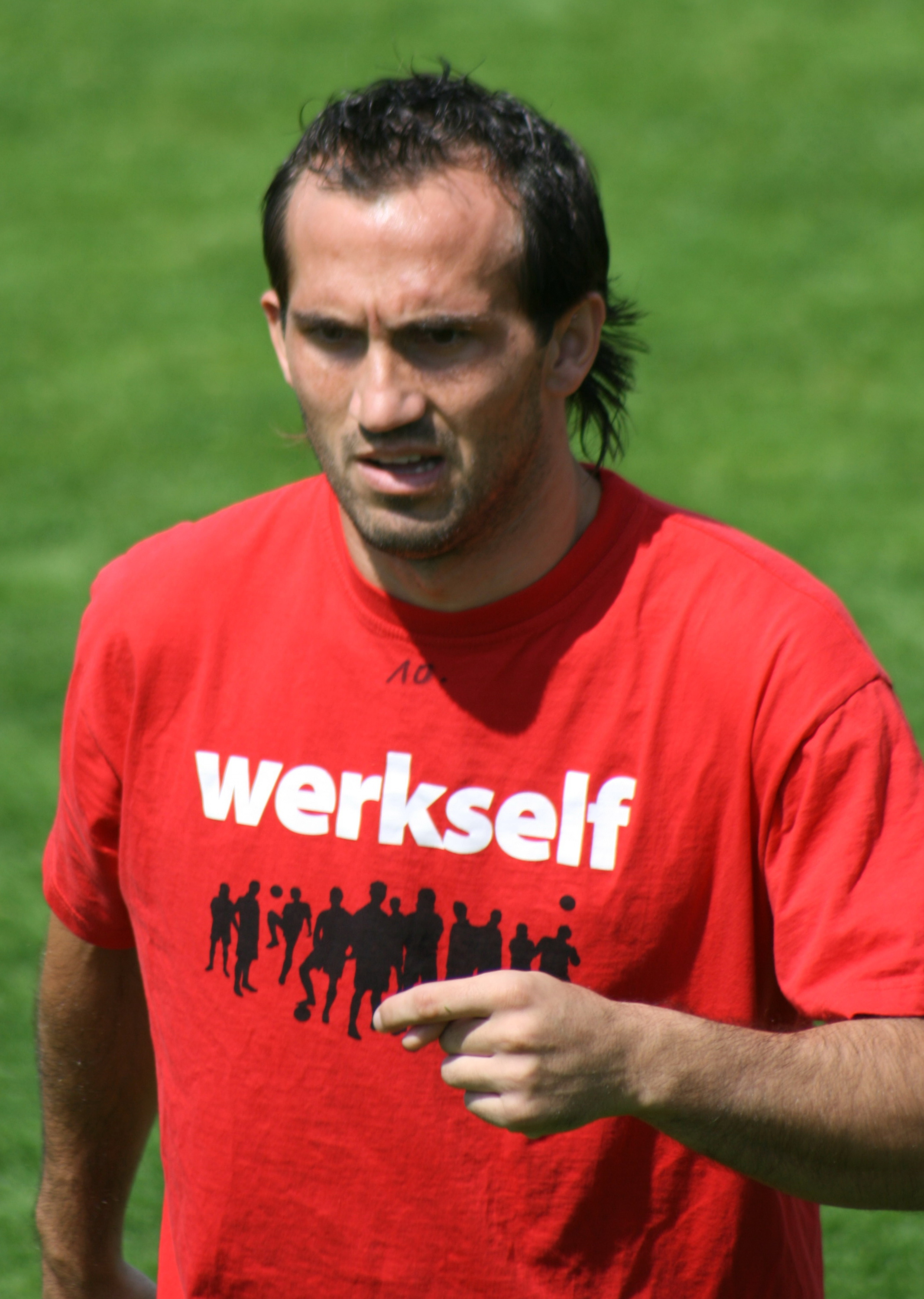
- Gekas training for Bayer Leverkusen in 2007

Personal information
- Full name: Theofanis Gekas
- Date of birth: 23 May 1980 (age 46)
- Place of birth: Larissa, Greece
- Height: 1.80 m (5 ft 11 in)
- Position: Striker

Youth career
- 1997–1998: Toxotis Larissa
- 1998: AEL

Senior career*
Years	Team	Apps	(Gls)
1998–2001	AEL	61	(16)
2001–2005	Kallithea	100	(44)
2005–2007	Panathinaikos	41	(23)
2006–2007	→ VfL Bochum (loan)	32	(20)
2007–2010	Bayer Leverkusen	50	(13)
2009	→ Portsmouth (loan)	1	(0)
2010	→ Hertha BSC (loan)	17	(6)
2010–2012	Eintracht Frankfurt	48	(23)
2012	Samsunspor	11	(8)
2012–2013	Levante	4	(0)
2013	Akhisar Belediyespor	15	(12)
2013–2014	Konyaspor	24	(13)
2014–2015	Akhisar Belediyespor	24	(12)
2015	Eskisehirspor	10	(5)
2016–2017	Sion	30	(13)
2017	Sivasspor	10	(2)
Total		480	(210)

International career
2005–2014	Greece	78	(24)

Managerial career
- 2021–2022: Panegialios
- 2022: Akhisarspor
- 2023: Darıca Gençlerbirliği
- 2023–2024: Tilikratis
- 2025: Rodos
- * Club domestic league appearances and goals

Theofanis Gekas (Greek: Θεοφάνης Γκέκας; born 23 May 1980) is a Greek professional football official, coach and former player who played as a striker.

He has been the top goalscorer of Super League Greece and the Bundesliga in previous seasons. Most of his career has been spent in those two countries and Turkey, but he has also played top-flight football in England and Spain.

At international level, Gekas represented Greece at two European Championships and as many World Cups, earning 78 caps between 2005 and 2014. He was the top goalscorer of the European section of 2010 FIFA World Cup qualification with 10 goals. With 24 goals for his national football team, he is Greece's third highest all-time goalscorer.

== Club career ==
=== AEL ===
Gekas started his professional career in the summer of 1998 at his hometown-based club AEL (then of the Greek Second Division).

=== Kallithea ===
In the summer of 2001, and after three years at Larissa, he moved to Kallithea. In his first season with the club, Kallithea was promoted to the Greek top division. Gekas scored 14 goals in 26 league matches and became top goalscorer of the 2001–02 league. Also, Gekas in 87 second division matches with Larissa and Kallithea scored 30 goals.

=== Panathinaikos ===
After scoring 46 goals in 80 matches for Kallithea at second and first Greek divisions and Greek Cup, Gekas and the club agreed to a transfer to Panathinaikos during the 2005 winter break. At his new club, Gekas became top goal scorer of the Greek league in 2005 with 18 goals. He was called to the national squad, making his playing debut in the 2–0 World Cup qualifying rounds victory against Albania in March 2005. As a member of the national team, Gekas also participated in the Confederations Cup 2005. With Panathinaikos, Gekas scored 23 goals in 41 appearances. In the season 2005–06, Gekas made his debut in the UEFA Champions League and came second in the Greek top goalscorers list for the competition.

=== VfL Bochum ===
The 2. Bundesliga club VfL Bochum showed an interest in Gekas already by the spring of 2006, but Panathinaikos wanted €2 million for its forward.

In the summer of 2006, Panathinaikos signed Dimitris Salpingidis from PAOK FC and, as part of the deal, Gekas was supposed to agree to a transfer to PAOK. Gekas refused and Panathinakos loaned Gekas out to VfL Bochum, which had just achieved promotion to the top division, for €300,000, with the German club having the option to buy out the rights for Gekas at the end of the season, if they were to remain in the top division, for another €700,000.

During the 2006–07 season, VfL Bochum was fighting against relegation, but within a short period Gekas became one of the stars of the team and popular among fans. His goals were celebrated with sirtakis from the stadium's loudspeakers. Coach Marcel Koller described him in November 2006 as their "life insurance", since Bochum not only avoided relegation but secured their place in the Bundesliga quite a few matchdays before the last. Gekas went on to finish the season as Bundesliga's top scorer, with a tally of 20 goals.

=== Bayer Leverkusen ===
At the end of April 2007, VfL Bochum agreed to transfer Gekas to Bayer 04 Leverkusen for the following season. The transfer deal was as follows: Bayer 04 Leverkusen would pay €700,000 at the end of the season to Panathinaikos, and, if Bochum were to be relegated, they would get €1.5 million from Leverkusen. If Bochum were to remain in the Bundesliga's First Division, they would get €4 million from Leverkusen.

Gekas' first game for Bayer Leverkusen was a friendly which Bayer won 15–1 with Gekas scoring seven of those 15. However, despite being the top scorer for Bayer Leverkusen in the 2007–08 season, Gekas was consistently dropped from the squad by coach Michael Skibbe, making mostly substitute appearances. Following an injury to teammate Dmitri Bulykin, Gekas was placed back into the starting XI and scored three goals in three games, including two more against Hamburg in a game which earned Leverkusen a quarter-final spot in the UEFA Cup in March 2008.

=== Portsmouth ===
On 2 February 2009, Gekas was loaned by Leverkusen to Portsmouth for the remainder of the 2008–09 season.

Gekas was brought in by manager Tony Adams with a view to a permanent deal. However, soon after the move, Adams was sacked and replaced by caretaker Paul Hart. Gekas was not given any games and went on to state his desire to leave the club, with Zenit St. Petersburg reportedly being interested in him.

On 11 April 2009, he came on as a substitute for one minute, replacing Jermaine Pennant in a 2–2 draw with West Bromwich Albion at Fratton Park in his only Portsmouth match. His loan period was terminated by Portsmouth on 21 May 2009 two weeks earlier than initially expected and he returned to Bayer Leverkusen.

=== Bayer Leverkusen ===
Gekas, while playing for his national team, became the top scorer in the European section of the qualification for 2010 World Cup. But in Leverkusen, he was competing with Stefan Kießling, Eren Derdiyok and Patrick Helmes for a place in the starting formation, and he failed to establish himself. He left the club after half a year.

=== Hertha ===
On 17 December 2009, Bayer Leverkusen signed a half-year loan of Gekas with Hertha BSC. In his first game for Hertha, Gekas scored in the team's 0–3 away win against Hannover 96 on 16 January 2010. Despite that promising start, Hertha continued to struggle at the bottom of the Bundesliga table. Gekas' most notable performance came on 21 March 2010, when he scored a hat-trick in the 1–5 away victory over German champions VfL Wolfsburg. Hertha eventually did not avoid relegation. Gekas ended up scoring 6 goals in 17 appearances for the club.

=== Eintracht Frankfurt ===
On 19 May 2010, Gekas signed a two-year contract with Eintracht Frankfurt. He scored 16 goals in 34 appearances but this did not prevent Eintracht from being relegated to the German second division.

Gekas left Eintracht under a cloud, after having not picked up the language during his almost six years in Germany. "I wonder how it is possible for somebody to be living in Germany for five years but not be willing to learn the language" said Eintracht legend Egon Loy. When Gekas was told about the criticism, he responded: "I am being paid to score goals, not to speak."

=== Later career ===
On 7 January 2012, Gekas signed a six-month contract with Süper Lig side Samsunspor. He scored his first goals against Orduspor, and scored a hat-trick two weeks later, in a game against Fenerbahçe. In August 2012, Gekas moved to the Spanish La Liga, signing a two-year contract with Levante UD. He left the club on 27 November of the same year. On 25 January 2013, Gekas signed a one-and-a-half-year contract with Turkish Süper Lig side Akhisar Belediyespor, then struggling to avoid relegation. He scored a goal on his debut on 1 February 2013 against Kayserispor. Gekas went on to score 12 goals overall in the 15 games he played during the rest of the 2012–13 season. Akhisar avoided relegation. On 5 September 2013, Gekas signed a one-year contract with Süper Lig club Torku Konyaspor, wearing the number 22 shirt.

On 26 July 2014, Gekas completed a return to his former club Akhisar Belediyespor, signing a two-year contract. On 3 April 2015, despite the fact that Gekas had no injury problems and was the top scorer of the club, he was left out of the squad in a surprise move by manager Roberto Carlos. On 7 July 2015, Gekas signed a one-year contract with Süper Lig club Eskişehirspor. On 20 November 2015, Gekas left Eskişehirspor after his contract was cancelled by mutual consent.

On 1 February 2016, Gekas agreed to join Sion until the summer 2017 and to continue his career in Switzerland, after three years in Turkey. Six days later, in a Swiss Super League away win game against FC Zürich he made his debut with the club as a late substitute. On 17 February, he made his debut in the UEFA Europa League as a late substitute in a game against Sporting Braga for the round of 32. On 24 February 2016, Gekas' performance against Sporting Braga wasn't enough for Sion to qualify for the last 16 of UEFA Europa League. The Greek striker scores two amazing goals against the Portuguese team but his team didn't make it to the next round after 2–2 tie. On 27 February 2016, he scored a brace in a 3–2 home win against FC Luzern. On 23 April 2016, he scored a hat-trick in Sion's victory against FC Lugano, being the second scorer of the club in just 12 games. On 25 May 2016, he scored a brace in a 2–2 away draw against FC Luzern arrived at 10 goals in his first season in the Swiss Super League. On 27 August 2016, he opened the score in a 3–1 home win against FC Vaduz. It was his first goal for the 2016–17 season. On 29 October 2016, he netted two goals in his return in the first XI helping his club to reach a triumphic 5–1 home win against FC Lugano.

On 14 December 2016, Sivasspor officially announced the signing of Gekas till the summer of 2018, for an undisclosed fee. On 20 February 2017, he scored his first goal in the league at the very late minute of the game, giving his club a crucial 3–2 away win against Denizlispor in their effort to be promoted. On 19 March 2017, in a game against Şanlıurfaspor, he faced a dilatation joint in the medial side combined with damaged cruciate ligaments, thus forcing him to remain out of action for approximately 1–2 months. On 7 May 2017, he returned to the squad as a substitute in a 3–0 home win against Bandırmaspor.

== International career ==
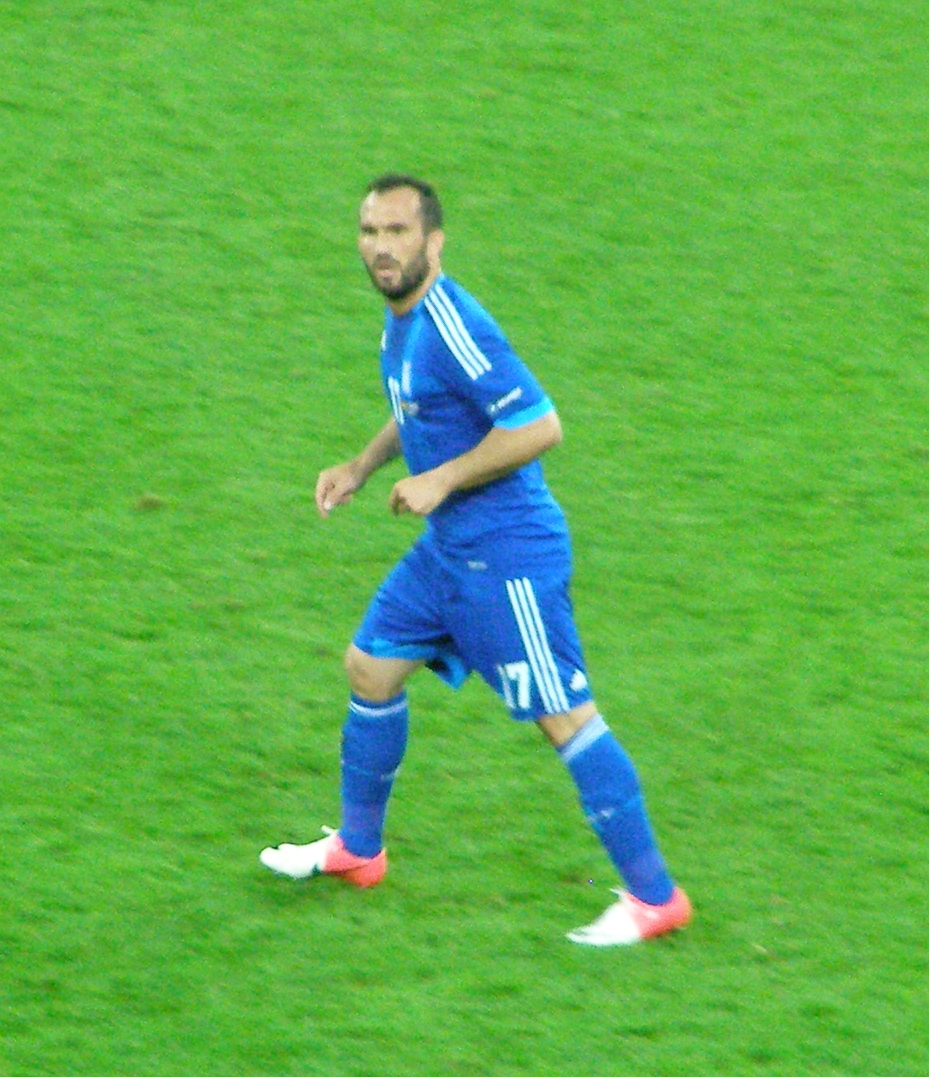
Gekas with the Greece national team against Germany at Euro 2012

Gekas helped his country's team to reach UEFA Euro 2008 and also became the top scorer among the 2010 World Cup Qualifiers from UEFA nations with 10 goals. At the 2010 World Cup he helped the team to reach the team's first victory at a World Cup. Gekas is also fifth in the top scorer rankings of the Greece national team. On 9 September 2010, Gekas officially announced his decision to retire from the national team of Greece, due to "special circumstances inside the team", as he mentioned. This was the third player retirement after the departure of coach Otto Rehhagel, following Sotiris Kyrgiakos and Ioannis Amanatidis.

One year later, Gekas stated that it was a mistake for him to retire from the national team, thus making himself once again available to be selected by manager Fernando Santos.

He was part of the Greek squad at UEFA Euro 2012, where he played in every match and scored one goal in a 2–1 loss against the Czech Republic in the group stage, as his country reached the quarter-finals of the tournament.

At the 2014 FIFA World Cup, Gekas started the team's first match against Colombia, which ended in a 3–0 loss. Gekas came on a substitute in the subsequent games against Japan (a 0–0 draw) and Ivory Coast (a 2–1 victory), putting Greece through to the knockout stage of the World Cup for the first time. In Greece's round of 16 match against Costa Rica, Gekas came on as a substitute in the 69th minute and assisted Sokratis Papastathopoulos' 91st-minute equaliser with a shot that was parried into the defender's path by Keylor Navas. The match was decided by a penalty shootout, with Gekas the only player to miss in a 5–3 Costa Rican victory.

Gekas announced that a return to the Greece national team is not among his options: "The door of the Greece National Team is closed. I would like to thank all the people there whom I worked with the last decade and I hope that the current players can lead the team back to the former glories."

== Personal life ==
Shortly after the 2008 European Championships, his wife Vasso gave birth to twins Nikolaos and Mikaela-Lamprini.

== Career statistics ==
=== Club ===
Appearances and goals by club, season and competition
Club	Season	League			Cup		Continental		Total	
Club	Season	Division	Apps	Goals	Apps	Goals	Apps	Goals	Apps	Goals
AEL	1998–99	Beta Ethniki	8	1	1	0	—		9	1
AEL	1999–2000	Beta Ethniki	24	5	2	1	—		26	6
AEL	2000–01	Beta Ethniki	29	10	1	0	—		30	10
AEL	Total		61	16	4	1	0	0	65	17
Kallithea	2001–02	Beta Ethniki	26	14	1	0	—		27	14
Kallithea	2002–03	Alpha Ethniki	29	8	2	1	—		31	9
Kallithea	2003–04	Alpha Ethniki	29	13	1	0	—		30	13
Kallithea	2004–05	Alpha Ethniki	16	9	2	1	—		18	10
Kallithea	Total		100	44	6	2	0	0	106	46
Panathinaikos	2004–05	Alpha Ethniki	13	8	1	0	2	0	16	8
Panathinaikos	2005–06	Alpha Ethniki	28	15	1	0	4	0	33	15
Panathinaikos	Total		41	23	2	0	6	0	49	23
VfL Bochum (loan)	2006–07	Bundesliga	32	20	3	2	—		35	22
Bayer Leverkusen	2007–08	Bundesliga	29	11	1	0	10 (Note: Appearance(s) in UEFA Cup)	2	40	13
Bayer Leverkusen	2008–09	Bundesliga	15	2	3	1	—		18	3
Bayer Leverkusen	2009–10	Bundesliga	6	0	2	1	—		8	1
Bayer Leverkusen	Total		50	13	6	2	10	2	66	17
Portsmouth (loan)	2008–09	Premier League	1	0	0	0	0	0	1	0
Hertha BSC (loan)	2009–10	Bundesliga	17	6	1	1	2	0	20	7
Eintracht Frankfurt	2010–11	Bundesliga	34	16	3	2	—		37	18
Eintracht Frankfurt	2011–12	2. Bundesliga	14	7	1	2	—		15	9
Eintracht Frankfurt	Total		48	23	4	4	0	0	52	27
Samsunspor	2011–12	Süper Lig	11	8	1	0	—		12	8
Levante	2012–13	La Liga	4	0	0	0	5	1	9	1
Akhisar Belediyespor	2012–13	Süper Lig	15	12	0	0	—		15	12
Konyaspor	2013–14	Süper Lig	24	13	1	0	—		25	13
Akhisar Belediyespor	2014–15	Süper Lig	24	12	3	1	—		27	13
Eskisehirspor	2015–16	Süper Lig	10	5	0	0	—		10	5
Sion	2015–16	Swiss Super League	18	10	1	0	2	2	21	12
Sion	2016–17	Swiss Super League	12	3	0	0	0	0	12	3
Sion	Total		30	13	1	0	2	2	33	15
Sivasspor	2016–17	TFF First League	10	2	2	1	—		12	3
Total			478	210	34	14	25	5	537	229

=== International ===
Greece
Year	Apps	Goals
2005	6	0
2006	5	0
2007	11	6
2008	13	6
2009	10	8
2010	7	0
2011	3	1
2012	11	2
2013	3	1
2014	9	0
Total	78	24

=== International goals ===
Goal	Date	Venue	Opponent	Score	Result	Competition
1.	2 June 2007	Heraklion, Greece	Hungary	2–0	Win	UEFA Euro 2008 qualifier
2.	22 August 2007	Thessaloniki, Greece	Spain	2–3	Loss	Friendly Match
3.	13 October 2007	Athens, Greece	Bosnia and Herzegovina	3–2	Win	UEFA Euro 2008 qualifier
4.	17 November 2007	Athens, Greece	Malta	5–0	Win	UEFA Euro 2008 qualifier
5.	17 November 2007	Athens, Greece	Malta	5–0	Win	UEFA Euro 2008 qualifier
6.	17 November 2007	Athens, Greece	Malta	5–0	Win	UEFA Euro 2008 qualifier
7.	20 August 2008	Bratislava, Slovakia	Slovakia	0–2	Win	Friendly Match
8.	20 August 2008	Bratislava, Slovakia	Slovakia	0–2	Win	Friendly Match
9.	6 September 2008	Luxembourg, Luxembourg	Luxembourg	0–3	Win	2010 FIFA World Cup qualifier
10.	10 September 2008	Riga, Latvia	Latvia	0–2	Win	2010 FIFA World Cup qualifier
11.	10 September 2008	Riga, Latvia	Latvia	0–2	Win	2010 FIFA World Cup qualifier
12.	19 November 2008	Piraeus, Greece	Italy	1–1	Draw	Friendly Match
13.	11 February 2009	Piraeus, Greece	Denmark	1–1	Draw	Friendly Match
14.	28 March 2009	Ramat Gan, Israel	Israel	1–1	Draw	2010 FIFA World Cup qualifier
15.	9 September 2009	Chişinău, Moldova	Moldova	1–1	Draw	2010 FIFA World Cup qualifier
16.	10 October 2009	Athens, Greece	Latvia	5–2	Win	2010 FIFA World Cup qualifier
17.	10 October 2009	Athens, Greece	Latvia	5–2	Win	2010 FIFA World Cup qualifier
18.	10 October 2009	Athens, Greece	Latvia	5–2	Win	2010 FIFA World Cup qualifier
19.	10 October 2009	Athens, Greece	Latvia	5–2	Win	2010 FIFA World Cup qualifier
20.	14 October 2009	Athens, Greece	Luxembourg	2–1	Win	2010 FIFA World Cup qualifier
21.	7 October 2011	Piraeus, Greece	Croatia	2–0	Win	UEFA Euro 2012 qualifier
22.	12 June 2012	Wrocław, Poland	Czech Republic	1–2	Loss	UEFA Euro 2012
23.	7 September 2012	Riga, Latvia	Latvia	1–2	Win	2014 FIFA World Cup qualifier
24.	22 March 2013	Zenica, Bosnia and Herzegovina	Bosnia and Herzegovina	3–1	Loss	2014 FIFA World Cup qualifier

== Managerial statistics ==
As of match played 10 March 2024

Team	From	To	Record				
Team	From	To	G	W	D	L	Win %
Panegialios	4 September 2021	30 June 2022	25	4	7	14	16.00
Akhisarspor	1 July 2022	5 December 2022	16	2	8	6	12.50
Darıca Gençlerbirliği	18 October 2023	6 December 2023	6	1	4	1	16.67
Tilikratis	7 December 2023	10 March 2024	11	3	1	7	27.27
Rodos	8 October 2023	24 October 2023	2	0	1	1	0.00
Total			60	10	21	29	16.67

== Honours ==
=== Individual ===
- Greek Super League top scorer: 2004–05 (18 goals)
- Bundesliga top scorer: 2006–07 (20 goals)
- 2010 FIFA World Cup Qualifiers UEFA section top scorer
