= Thomas Rathgeber =

German footballer (born 1985)

Personal information
- Date of birth: 30 April 1985 (age 41)
- Place of birth: Kempten, West Germany
- Height: 1.89 m (6 ft 2 in)
- Position: Forward

Team information
- Current team: FC Kempten
- Number: 9

Youth career
- SV Heiligkreuz
- –2004: SSV Ulm
- 2004–2006: FC Kempten

Senior career*
Years	Team	Apps	(Gls)
2005	FC Kempten	18	(9)
2006–2007	VfL Bochum II	9	(3)
2006–2007	VfL Bochum	7	(0)
2007–2010	SpVgg Unterhaching	94	(26)
2009	SpVgg Unterhaching II	1	(1)
2010–2013	Kickers Offenbach	78	(19)
2012	Kickers Offenbach II	1	(0)
2013–2014	FC Saarbrücken	21	(4)
2015–2016	Schalke 04 II	42	(10)
2016–2019	SSV Ulm	74	(25)
2019–	FC Kempten	18	(5)
- * Club domestic league appearances and goals as of 02:02, 2 November 2019 (UTC)

Thomas Rathgeber (born 30 April 1985 in Kempten, West Germany) is a German footballer who plays for FC Kempten.

== Career statistics ==
As of 25 October 2015

Appearances and goals by club, season and competition
Club	Season	League			DFB-Pokal		Continental		Other		Total	
Club	Season	Division	App.	Goals	App.	Goals	App.	Goals	App.	Goals	App.	Goals
FC Kempten	2005–06	Bayernliga	18	9	0	0	0	0	0	0	18	9
VfL Bochum II	2005–06	Oberliga Westfalen	1	0	0	0	0	0	0	0	1	0
VfL Bochum II	2006–07	Oberliga Westfalen	8	3	0	0	0	0	0	0	8	3
VfL Bochum	2005–06	2. Bundesliga	6	0	0	0	0	0	0	0	6	0
VfL Bochum	2006–07	Bundesliga	1	0	0	0	0	0	0	0	1	0
SpVgg Unterhaching	2006–07	2. Bundesliga	12	3	0	0	0	0	0	0	12	3
SpVgg Unterhaching	2007–08	Regionalliga Süd	25	7	1	0	0	0	0	0	26	7
SpVgg Unterhaching	2008–09	3. Liga	25	6	0	0	0	0	0	0	25	6
SpVgg Unterhaching	2009–10	3. Liga	32	10	1	0	0	0	0	0	33	10
SpVgg Unterhaching II	2009–10	Bayernliga	1	1	0	0	0	0	0	0	1	1
Kickers Offenbach II	2011–12	Hessenliga	1	0	0	0	0	0	0	0	1	0
Kickers Offenbach	2010–11	3. Liga	30	8	3	0	0	0	0	0	33	8
Kickers Offenbach	2011–12	3. Liga	13	4	0	0	0	0	0	0	18	9
Kickers Offenbach	2012–13	3. Liga	35	7	4	1	0	0	0	0	39	8
1. FC Saarbrücken	2013–14	3. Liga	21	4	2	2	0	0	0	0	23	6
Schalke 04 II	2014–15	Regionalliga West	12	1	0	0	0	0	0	0	12	1
Schalke 04 II	2015–16	Regionalliga West	10	3	0	0	0	0	0	0	10	3
Total			251	66	11	3	0	0	0	0	262	69
