= Deran Toksöz =

German footballer

Personal information
- Date of birth: 21 May 1988 (age 38)
- Place of birth: Hamburg, West Germany
- Height: 1.74 m (5 ft 9 in)
- Position: Midfielder

Team information
- Current team: TSV Sasel
- Number: 28

Youth career
- Hamburger Turnerschaft
- –2007: VfL Bochum

Senior career*
Years	Team	Apps	(Gls)
2007	VfL Bochum II	1	(0)
2007–2009	FC Bergedorf 85	85	(20)
2010–2011	FC St. Pauli II	47	(14)
2011–2014	Holstein Kiel	41	(3)
2011–2014	Holstein Kiel II	10	(4)
2014–2018	Eintracht Norderstedt	141	(18)
2019–2020	FC Teutonia Ottensen	32	(15)
2020–	TSV Sasel	40	(20)
- * Club domestic league appearances and goals as of 6 November 2022

Deran Toksöz (born 21 May 1988) is a German footballer who plays as a midfielder for Oberliga Hamburg club TSV Sasel.

== Career ==
Toksöz made his professional debut in the 3. Liga for Holstein Kiel on 21 September 2013, starting against MSV Duisburg before being substituted out in the 14th minute for Manuel Hartmann due to a tactical change following a red card in the 11th minute by Kiel defender Marcel Gebers.

== Personal life ==
Born in Germany, Toksöz is of Turkish descent.
