= Michael Petri (footballer) =

German footballer

Personal information
- Date of birth: 23 November 1977 (age 48)
- Place of birth: Germany
- Position: Striker

Team information
- Current team: SV Röchling Völklingen (assistant manager)

Youth career
- –1992: Rot-Weiß Hasborn
- 1992–1996: 1. FC Saarbrücken

Senior career*
Years	Team	Apps	(Gls)
1996–2000	1. FC Saarbrücken	31	(3)
2000–2002	VfL Osnabrück	50	(6)
2002–2006	SV Elversberg	41	(1)
2006–2010	FC Homburg	112	(38)
2010–2011	RW Hasborn-Dautweiler	32	(14)
2011–2012	SV Röchling Völklingen	26	(7)
Total		292	(69)
- * Club domestic league appearances and goals

Michael Petri (born 23 November 1977) is a German former professional footballer who played as a striker. He spent much of his career in the South-west region, but also played for VfL Osnabrück, for whom he made 25 appearances in the 2. Bundesliga.
