= Thorsten Barg =

German footballer (born 1986)

Personal information
- Date of birth: 25 August 1986 (age 40)
- Place of birth: Herrenberg, West Germany
- Height: 1.91 m (6 ft 3 in)
- Position: Defender

Youth career
- SV Oberreichenbach
- –2001: VfL Herrenberg
- 2001–2003: Karlsruher SC
- 2003–2005: VfL Bochum

Senior career*
Years	Team	Apps	(Gls)
2005–2006	VfL Bochum II	19	(0)
2005–2006	VfL Bochum	0	(0)
2006–2008	Karlsruher SC II	51	(2)
2008–2013	SV Wehen Wiesbaden II	23	(1)
2008–2013	SV Wehen Wiesbaden	32	(4)

Managerial career
- 2013–2014: SV Wehen Wiesbaden U19 (assistant)
- * Club domestic league appearances and goals

Thorsten Barg (born 25 August 1986) is a German former professional footballer who played as a defender. His brother is Benjamin Barg.

== Career ==
Barg made his debut on the professional league level in the 2. Bundesliga for SV Wehen Wiesbaden on 8 March 2009, when he started in a game against Rot-Weiss Ahlen.

== Career statistics ==
Club performance			League		Cup		Total	
Season	Club	League	Apps	Goals	Apps	Goals	Apps	Goals
Germany			League		DFB-Pokal		Total	
2005–06	VfL Bochum II	Oberliga Westfalen	19	0	1	0	20	0
2005–06	VfL Bochum	2. Bundesliga	0	0	0	0	0	0
2006–07	Karlsruher SC II	Regionalliga Süd	27	1	—		27	1
2007–08	Karlsruher SC II	Regionalliga Süd	24	1	—		24	1
2008–09	SV Wehen Wiesbaden II	Regionalliga Süd	12	0	—		12	0
2009–10	SV Wehen Wiesbaden II	Regionalliga Süd	2	1	—		2	1
2010–11	SV Wehen Wiesbaden II	Regionalliga Süd	0	0	—		0	0
2011–12	SV Wehen Wiesbaden II	Hessenliga	0	0	—		0	0
2012–13	SV Wehen Wiesbaden II	Hessenliga	9	0	—		9	0
2008–09	SV Wehen Wiesbaden	2. Bundesliga	5	0	1	0	0	0
2009–10	SV Wehen Wiesbaden	3. Liga	18	3	1	0	19	3
2010–11	SV Wehen Wiesbaden	3. Liga	7	1	—		7	1
2011–12	SV Wehen Wiesbaden	3. Liga	0	0	0	0	0	0
2012–13	SV Wehen Wiesbaden	3. Liga	2	0	—		2	0
Total	Germany		120	7	3	0	123	7
Career total			120	7	3	0	123	7
