= Zvjezdan Misimović =

Bosnian footballer and administrator (born 1982)

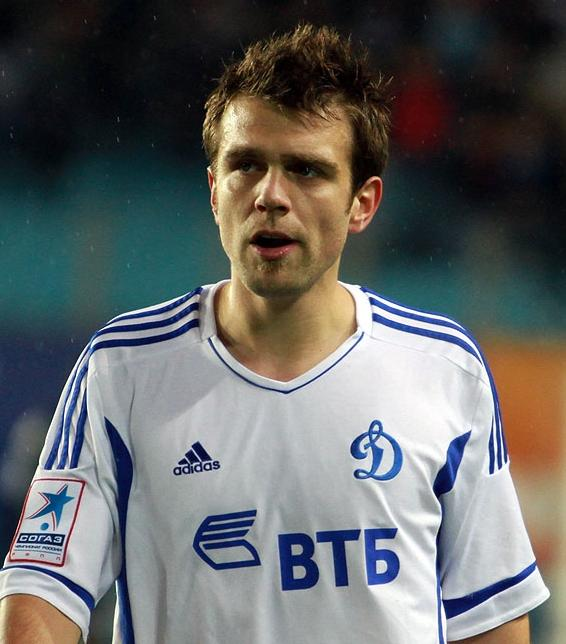
- Misimović with Dynamo Moscow in 2011

Personal information
- Date of birth: 5 June 1982 (age 44)
- Place of birth: Munich, West Germany
- Height: 1.79 m (5 ft 10 in)
- Position: Attacking midfielder

Youth career
- SV Nord Lerchenau
- TSV Forstenried
- SV Gartenstadt Trudering
- –1996: FT Gern
- 1996–2000: Bayern Munich

Senior career*
Years	Team	Apps	(Gls)
2000–2004	Bayern Munich II	102	(44)
2002–2004	Bayern Munich	3	(0)
2004–2007	VfL Bochum	92	(21)
2007–2008	1. FC Nürnberg	28	(10)
2008–2010	VfL Wolfsburg	65	(17)
2010–2011	Galatasaray	9	(0)
2011–2013	Dynamo Moscow	44	(8)
2013–2016	Guizhou/Beijing Renhe	88	(17)
Total		431	(117)

International career
1999–2001	FR Yugoslavia U18	7	(6)
2002	FR Yugoslavia U21	1	(0)
2004–2018	Bosnia and Herzegovina	84	(25)
- * Club domestic league appearances and goals

Zvjezdan Misimović (pronounced [zʋjězdan misǐːmoʋitɕ]; born 5 June 1982) is a Bosnian football executive and former player. He is the current president of FK Borac Banja Luka.

An attacking midfielder, Misimović made a name for himself while playing for VfL Wolfsburg, with whom he won the Bundesliga in the 2008–09 season. In the same season, he achieved 20 assists, setting the record at the time for most assists in a Bundesliga season. The following season, he achieved 15 assists and was the runner-up to Mesut Özil. After a short stint with Galatasaray, he moved to Russia to play for Dynamo Moscow and ended his career in China with Guizhou/Beijing Renhe.

Born in Germany, Misimović represented the Bosnia and Herzegovina national team. He is the fourth most capped player in the history of the national team, capped 84 times. His 25 international goals also makes him his country's third top-goalscorer. He played for Bosnia and Herzegovina at the 2014 FIFA World Cup.

== Early life ==
Misimović was born to a family of Bosnian Serb gastarbeiters who had come to West Germany from Bosanska Gradiška during the late 1960s.

== Club career ==
=== Early career ===
Known in Germany as Zwetschge (a German plum) due to similar pronunciation to his first name, Misimović was a product of Bayern Munich youth academy. He played for four years with the club's reserve team, collecting 44 goals in 102 appearances. In the 2003–04 Regionalliga season, Misimović scored 21 goals, a personal best, finishing the league as top goalscorer jointly with Paolo Guerrero, his teammate. His first and only hat-trick on club level came in a 5–1 win over SC Pfullendorf on 2 November. Bayern II won the championship, but since being a reserve side, were barred from promotion, thus allowing 1. FC Saarbrücken to be promoted to the 2004–05 2. Bundesliga.

During the 2002–03 Bundesliga season, he was able to play five times for the main squad. His senior debut occurred on 12 April 2003 in a 0–1 loss to Werder Bremen; he entered the match as a 78-minute substitute, replacing fellow midfielder Bastian Schweinsteiger.

Misimović joined VfL Bochum at the start of the 2004–05 season. He left the club at the end of 2007–08 season after his contract expired, while his move to 1. FC Nürnberg was announced in January 2007.

Misimović signed for 1. FC Nürnberg in July 2007, immediately becoming one of the most important players in the squad. He made his first appearance of the season in the opening championship week against Karlsruher SC. Later on 15 September, he opened his scoring account by netting his side's first goal in an eventual 2–2 home draw against Hannover 96. In January of the following year, he suffered a groin injury, but was recovered back in time for the start of the second part of the season. However, in February, he was injured again, this time in his ankle ligament, which kept him sidelined for the 2007–08 UEFA Cup round of 32 tie against Benfica; without him, Nürnberg lost 3–2 on aggregate and was eliminated from the competition. It was a breakthrough season for Misimović, who scored ten league goals in 28 appearances, earning him a transfer to VfL Wolfsburg.

=== VfL Wolfsburg ===
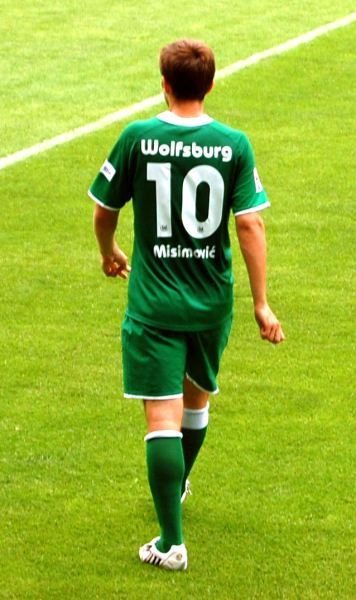
Misimović with VfL Wolfsburg in 2008

Misimović completed a transfer to fellow Bundesliga side VfL Wolfsburg in June 2008 for €3.9 million, with the move becoming official on 1 July. He signed a contract until June 2012 and took squad number 10 for the 2008–09 season.

Misimović made his official debut for the team on 16 August in the opening league match against 1. FC Köln, scoring the winning goal in the 78th minute for a 2–1 win at home. In October, he scored a brace in a 4–1 win over Arminia Bielefeld in his 100th Bundesliga appearance. Together with fellow Bosnian international Edin Džeko and Brazilian striker Grafite, they formed "the magic triangle". He played 33 matches during the season, all of them as starter, being instrumental for Wolfsburg who won its first ever Bundesliga title. Misimović scored seven league goals, and also achieved 20 assists for the club, which was the record number of assists in one Bundesliga season, until Kevin De Bruyne surpassed it with one assist more, also while playing for Wolfsburg as well, in the 2014–15 season. In the DFB-Pokal, Misimović played four matches as his side was knocked out in quarter-finals by Werder Bremen, while in the UEFA Cup, he contributed with eight matches and four goals, including a brace against Braga in group stage, as Wolfsburg was eliminated in knockout stage.

On 4 August 2009, Misimović's outstanding performances were rewarded with a new deal until 2013. He commented about the renewal, stating that he "feels at home" at Wolfsburg". Later in September, Misimović made his UEFA Champions League debut by playing full-90 minutes in a 3–1 home win against Russia's CSKA Moscow in the first group stage match. He played in all group matches, but Wolfsburg finished in third place, and were demoted to the UEFA Europa League. His only goal in the competition came on 3 November against Beşiktaş, netting the opener and then setting the third scored by Džeko in a 3–0 win at Vodafone Park. In December, Misimović was one of the four Wolfsburg players to be nominated for 2009 UEFA Team of the Year, but did not made the final list. In the Europa League, he scored his only goal in a round of 16 tie against Rubin Kazan in an eventual quarter-final exit.

In the 2009–10 season, despite Wolfsburg's failure to retain the title, Misimović continued with his excellent performances, recording 15 assists, two short of Mesut Özil. He also bagged 10 goals, equalling his personal best in top flight first set with Nürnberg in the 2007–08 season. For the 2010–11 season, the arrival of playmaker Diego made Misimović's future at the club uncertain. Despite appearing in the 2–1 away defeat to Bayern Munich in the season opener, he left the club in the last day of the summer transfer window, opting to join Galatasaray in Turkey.

Misimović concluded his two-year spell at Wolfsburg by making 92 appearances in all competitions and scoring 25 goals.

=== Galatasaray ===
On 31 August 2010, Galatasaray announced that Misimović had joined the team on a four-year contract for a sum of €7 million. He played his first match for the team on 13 September against Gaziantepspor. Despite initially becoming an undisputed starter, on 18 November 2010, Misimović was consigned to the reserve squad, as the head coach Gheorghe Hagi stated that he "didn't need him in the squad". He left the club in March 2011 after a disappointing spell, having made only nine appearances.

=== Dynamo Moscow ===
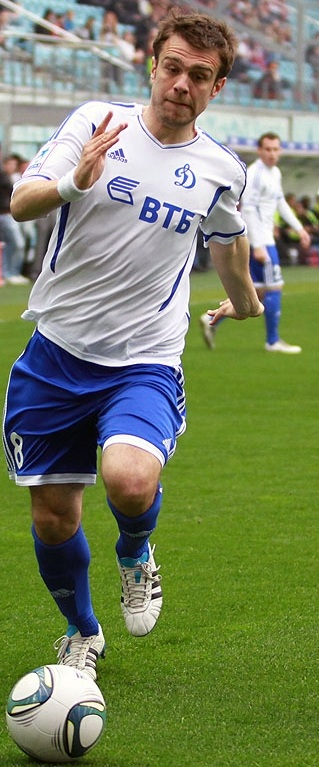
Misimović playing for Dynamo Moscow in 2011

On 3 March 2011, Misimović signed for Russian club Dynamo Moscow in a deal thought to be worth €4.5 million. The deal was until 2014. Before leaving Galatasaray, Misimović called coach Gheorghe Hagi "a liar", but added that he wished his former club all the best.

Misimović made his competitive debut for the team on 12 March 2011 in a league match against Lokomotiv Moscow, while his first goal came in the next match against Rostov, netting a penalty kick in a 3–1 home win.

Misimović concluded his first season in Russia by scoring ten goals in all competitions; he scored eight goals in the league, including the winner against CSKA Moscow in April 2012. In the 2011–12 Russian Cup, he scored the lone goal of the quarter-final match against Zenit Saint Petersburg, before scoring the winner in the semi-final against Volga Nizhny Novgorod, sending his team to the final. Both goals came in the same manner – from penalty kicks in the 73rd minute. In the final, Misimović played for 82 minutes, but Dynamo was defeated 1–0 by Rubin Kazan.

=== Guizhou/Beijing Renhe ===
On 4 January 2013, Misimović signed a contract for three years with Guizhou Renhe. Between 22 March and 3 April 2013, Misimović played three games on three continents.

In March 2015, Misimović announced that he would retire from professional football, aged 32. However, he made his return to the club three months later, in June 2015. In 2016, the club relocated from Guizhou to Beijing. Misimović announced his retirement again on 8 January 2017.

== International career ==
=== Youth ===
Misimović made the FR Yugoslavia under-18 national squad at the 2001 UEFA European Under-18 Championship in Finland. Playing alongside seventeen-year-old Dejan Milovanović as well as eighteen-year-olds Nenad Milijaš, Danko Lazović, and Aleksandar Luković who would go on to become established players in their own right, nineteen-year-old Misimović scored twice at the tournament: the winning goal in the group stage match against Ukraine as well as against the host country Finland.

Misimović later progressed to the FR Yugoslavia under-21 national team, but appeared in only one match as an 85th-minute substitute against France in November 2002. The under-21s head coach Vladimir Petrović soon dropped Misimović, reportedly telling the young player he was "overweight and slow".

=== Senior ===
By late 2003 and early 2004, twenty-one-year-old Misimović still had not made an appearance in any national team's full squad. Approached in the Bayern Munich gym by club teammate Hasan Salihamidžić about playing for the Bosnia and Herzegovina national team, Misimović was reportedly receptive to the idea immediately. After being put in touch with the Football Association of Bosnia and Herzegovina (N/FSBiH) officials Ahmet Pašalić and Munib Ušanović, the young creative midfielder's attachment to the team was agreed.

He debuted for Bosnia under head coach Blaž Slišković on 18 February 2004 in a friendly match against Macedonia in Skopje. About a month later, in another friendly, against Luxembourg in late March 2004, he netted his first goal.

==== 2006 World Cup qualifying ====
From fall 2004, VfL Bochum midfielder Misimović was used sparingly by Slišković during the 2006 FIFA World Cup qualifying campaign that saw Bosnia take on Spain, Serbia and Montenegro, Belgium, Lithuania, and San Marino. He played the full 90 minutes in the opening home draws against Spain and Serbia and Montenegro, followed by a substitute appearance in the away loss to Belgium.

Misimović then enjoyed a spell as a consistent starter before being subbed off 10–20 minutes into the second half: in the 1–1 home draw with Lithuania (scored the opening goal), the away win at San Marino, and finally the 1–1 draw against Spain in Valencia (again scored the opening goal before Spain tied deep into injury-time in the 96th minute).

For the deciding four qualifiers during late summer and early fall 2005 (home win against Belgium, the away win at Lithuania, home victory over San Marino, and the away defeat to Serbia and Montenegro), Slišković dropped Misimović (still playing his club football with Bochum but in 2. Bundesliga) to the bench, bringing him into action only in the final 15–20 minutes of each tie.

==== Euro 2008 qualifying ====
UEFA Euro 2008 qualifying began in fall 2006 with Slišković still the team's head coach and 24-year-old Misimović an established starter and goalscorer. The opening match dismantling of Malta was followed by the shocking 1–3 defeat to Hungary at home that prompted Slišković's resignation, which the coach retracted a couple of weeks later and stayed on. Still, more disappointment was to follow with a 2–2 draw at lowly Moldova, as Misimović sparked a comeback that ultimately fell short by scoring a goal at 2–0 down. Four days later, Bosnia were heavily defeated 0–4 by Greece at home, forcing Slišković to resign for the second time in three months – this time for good.

As the winter break in qualifying commenced, the Bosnian team was in crisis mode with relations inside the organization strained to the maximum. The turmoil led to thirteen Bosnian national team players (Misimović, Džemal Berberović, Vladan Grujić, Mladen Bartolović, Mirko Hrgović, Zlatan Bajramović, Saša Papac, Emir Spahić, Ninoslav Milenković, Ivica Grlić, Mirsad Bešlija, Kenan Hasagić and Almir Tolja) releasing what was reported as a "signed joint statement in protest". Published in the Dnevni Avaz daily in late October 2006 as a press release, the statement announces the players' intention to boycott national team matches until four N/FSBiH officials—Milan Jelić, Iljo Dominković, Sulejman Čolaković, and Ahmet Pašalić—resign their respective posts.

Some two months later, in late December 2006, new head coach Fuad Muzurović was announced. In relation to the boycott statement, Misimović soon did a complete turnaround, denying that he ever signed any such paper and stating that his relations with the N/FSBiH had always been amicable.

Under new head coach Muzurović, Misimović earned the national team captaincy.

==== Brief retirement ====
After Meho Kodro replaced Muzurović as head coach in early January 2008, one of the changes he introduced was stripping Misimović of the captain's armband and handing it to twenty-seven-year-old defender Emir Spahić who had just returned to the national team having boycotted it since the infamous fall 2006 protest letter.

On 8 April 2008, a few months into Kodro's tenure, still twenty-five-year-old Misimović announced his retirement from the national team, citing "health concerns" as he no longer felt able to "keep up with the physical rigours of playing for both club and country". However, many immediately began speculating that health had little to do with Misimović's sudden announcement. These suspicions were seemingly confirmed two days later by Bosnian national team general manager Elvir Bolić who hinted that Misimović might have softened his original stance and revealed that Kodro would travel to Germany to visit the player personally and discuss the "real reasons" for his decision. On 12 April, after speaking to Kodro, Misimović changed his mind and the N/FSBiH announced that the player had decided to continue his international career.

==== 2010 World Cup qualifying ====
Under the next head coach Ćiro Blažević during 2010 World Cup qualification process, Misimović asserted himself as the team's undisputed leader on the pitch, displaying great playmaking abilities and leadership qualities. His fine performances began with a hat-trick in a 7–0 victory over Estonia on 10 September 2008. Bosnia finished the group in second place, good enough for the November 2009 home-and-away playoffs where they were drawn against Portugal.

However, the qualifying campaign ended on a sour note both for Misimović personally and for the team. Misimović had a poor outing in the playoff first leg away in Lisbon and was widely criticized for his sub-par performance, even by head coach Blažević who publicly blasted the midfield creator for lack of contribution. The coach especially scolded him for two instances of losing possession in the middle of the pitch that resulted in respective Elvir Rahimić and Emir Spahić defensive tackles in order to prevent a Portuguese counterattack, both of which led to yellow cards that meant an automatic one-match suspension for each player for the return leg. Two days after the first leg (and two days before the 18 November 2009 return leg in Zenica), Misimović was ruled out by Bosnia-Herzegovina's medical staff due to a knee injury he had apparently picked up during the first leg.

Controversy arose three days later on 21 November 2009 when he played the full 90 minutes for VfL Wolfsburg in the Bundesliga against Nürnberg, leading to veiled accusations in the Bosnian media that he faked the injury to get back at Blažević. Head coach Blažević went further, directly accusing Misimović of sabotaging him. Blažević even went as far as alluding to Misimović's Serb ethnicity; suggesting a conspiracy "on instructions from the Republika Srpska Prime Minister Milorad Dodik and Serbian lobby because Republika Srpska would lose everything if Bosnia qualified for World Cup". When informed of Blažević's comments, a stunned Misimović responded that he would not play for Bosnia and Herzegovina as long as Blažević remained the head coach, and further accused Blažević of scapegoating him in order to deflect attention from Blažević's team "being thoroughly outplayed by Portugal in both matches". Even though he had already stated his intention to leave the post even before Misimović's latest words, Blažević responded by reiterating he would leave because "Misimović is more important to this team than I am". The next day, Blažević suddenly announced that he had supposedly resolved his differences with the player after apparently calling to congratulate the birth of his son, but this reconciliation was denied by Misimović two weeks later.

Blažević even announced his intent to travel to Wolfsburg for the Champions League group stage match between VfL Wolfsburg and Manchester United in order to visit Misimović personally, but ended up not doing so. Within days, Blažević resigned the Bosnia-Herzegovina head coaching post, revealing that he took an offer from China, and in his parting shot once again singled out Misimović as the "reason why Bosnia did not qualify for the 2010 World Cup". Three years later, in September 2012, Misimović revealed that he had considered suing Blažević for defamation.

==== Euro 2012 qualifying ====
Misimović played his 51st match for the national team against Luxembourg in September 2010, thereby equaling Elvir Bolić's record for most caps for Bosnia. Misimović surpassed Bolić in a match against France in Sarajevo on 7 September, making him the most capped player in the history of the national team with 52 matches played. Bosnia failed to qualify for Euro 2012 after losing a two-legged playoff against Portugal. Misimović scored a goal from a penalty kick in Lisbon.

==== 2014 World Cup qualifying ====
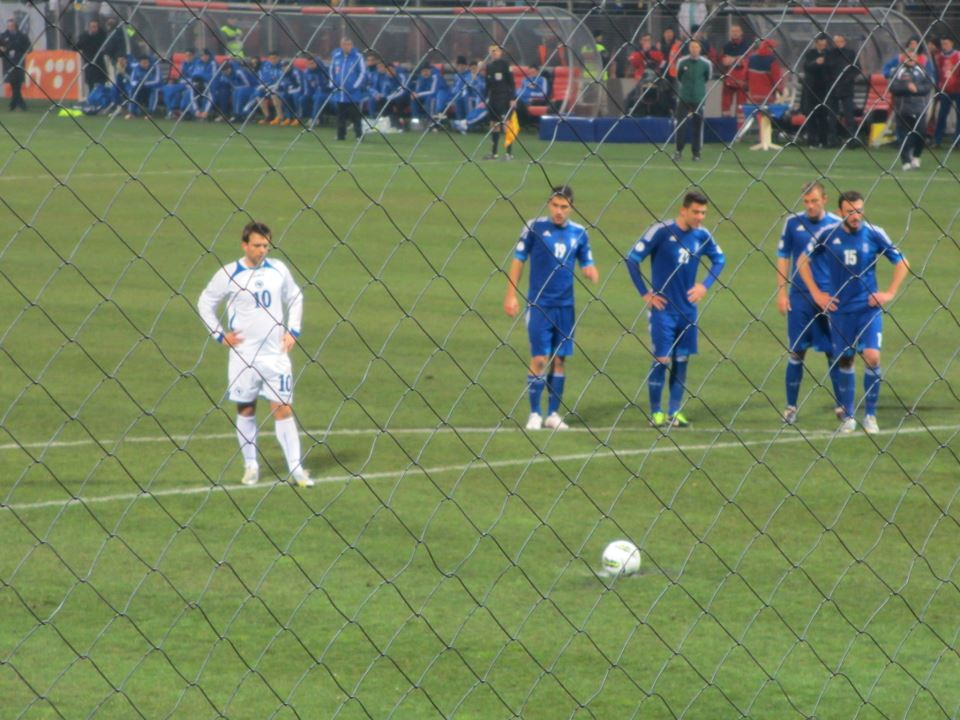
Misimović preparing to take a penalty kick during a World Cup qualifier against Greece in March 2013

Misimović made two assists for Edin Džeko in a victory over Greece in Zenica. Local media compared this situation to the way they played together in VfL Wolfsburg. His penalty kick against Greece was saved by goalkeeper Orestis Karnezis, but teammate Vedad Ibišević managed to convert the rebound for a score of 3–0. The match ended 3–1, with Greece scoring in stoppage time. Bosnia went on to qualify for the first finals tournament as an independent nation after topping their group on goal difference, and head-to-head.

==== 2014 World Cup ====
Misimović and Bosnia faced Argentina in their first match of the 2014 FIFA World Cup. Almost three minutes into the game, a free kick from Lionel Messi flicked on by Marcos Rojo, was deflected into the net for an own goal by Sead Kolašinac. It was the fastest own goal in the history of the World Cup. In the next half, Messi scored from the edge of the penalty area, tucking the ball into the bottom-right corner. Misimović was substituted 11 minutes later. With five minutes of the match remaining, Ibišević scored after a pass from Senad Lulić, which was Bosnia's first ever World Cup-goal. The match ended 2–1.

In the next deciding match, against Nigeria, Misimović played on the pitch for the entire match. A goal from Džeko was controversially deemed offside, as replays seemed to show that his goal should have stood. Instead, Nigeria took the lead in the 29th minute with a goal from Peter Odemwingie. Bosnia pushed on for the equalizer, and a shot from Džeko was deflected onto the post by Nigerian goalkeeper Vincent Enyeama in stoppage time. Nigeria won the match, which effectively eliminated Bosnia from the tournament with a match to spare. Misimović was dropped for the last match against Iran, and Bosnia went on to earn their first ever win in a World Cup tournament.

In August 2014, following his first and only World Cup, Misimović announced his retirement from international football. On 28 May 2018, he and teammates Vedad Ibišević and Emir Spahić played their farewell match for Bosnia and Herzegovina, a friendly against Montenegro which ended in a 0–0 draw.

== Post-playing career ==
Misimović was the director of the Bosnia and Herzegovina national football team from November 2022 to April 2024. After getting succeeded as director by former national teammate Emir Spahić, Misimović was employed by the Football Association of Bosnia and Herzegovina as an advisor. On 12 June 2025, he became president of FK Borac Banja Luka.

== Personal life ==
Misimović is an ethnic Serb, and an Orthodox Christian. His nicknames are Miske, and Zwetschge ("plum"). His favourite team is Red Star Belgrade, a team which he has said he would have loved to have retired in.

Misimović's wife, Štefanija, is from Strumica, North Macedonia. The couple have three sons together.

== Career statistics ==
=== Club ===
Appearances and goals by club, season and competition
Club	Season	League			Cup		Continental		Other		Total	
Club	Season	Division	Apps	Goals	Apps	Goals	Apps	Goals	Apps	Goals	Apps	Goals
Bayern Munich II	2000–01	Regionalliga Süd	12	1	—		—		—		12	1
Bayern Munich II	2001–02	Regionalliga Süd	31	14	—		—		—		31	14
Bayern Munich II	2002–03	Regionalliga Süd	28	8	—		—		—		28	8
Bayern Munich II	2003–04	Regionalliga Süd	31	21	—		—		—		31	21
Bayern Munich II	Total		102	44	—		—		—		102	44
Bayern Munich	2002–03	Bundesliga	1	0	1	0	0	0	0	0	2	0
Bayern Munich	2003–04	Bundesliga	2	0	1	0	0	0	0	0	3	0
Bayern Munich	Total		3	0	2	0	0	0	0	0	5	0
VfL Bochum	2004–05	Bundesliga	31	3	2	1	2 (Note: All appearance(s) in UEFA Cup)	0	1 (Note: Appearance in DFL-Ligapokal)	0	36	4
VfL Bochum	2005–06	2. Bundesliga	31	11	2	1	—		—		33	12
VfL Bochum	2006–07	Bundesliga	30	7	2	1	—		—		32	8
VfL Bochum	Total		92	21	6	3	2	0	1	0	101	24
1. FC Nürnberg	2007–08	Bundesliga	28	10	2	2	6	1	1	0	37	13
VfL Wolfsburg	2008–09	Bundesliga	33	7	4	0	8	4	—		36	11
VfL Wolfsburg	2009–10	Bundesliga	31	10	2	2	12 (Note: Six appearances and one goal in UEFA Champions League, six appearances and one goal in UEFA Europa League)	2	—		45	14
VfL Wolfsburg	2010–11	Bundesliga	1	0	1	0	—		—		2	0
VfL Wolfsburg	Total		65	17	7	2	20	6	—		92	25
Galatasaray	2010–11	Süper Lig	9	0	0	0	0	0	—		9	0
Dynamo Moscow	2011–12	Russian Premier League	35	8	4	2	—		—		39	10
Dynamo Moscow	2012–13	Russian Premier League	9	0	1	0	4 (Note: All appearance(s) in UEFA Europa League)	0	—		14	0
Dynamo Moscow	Total		44	8	6	2	4	0	—		54	10
Beijing Renhe	2013	Chinese Super League	24	5	6	2	5 (Note: All appearance(s) in AFC Champions League)	0	—		39	10
Beijing Renhe	2014	Chinese Super League	25	6	1	1	4	0	—		30	7
Beijing Renhe	2015	Chinese Super League	15	2	1	0	—		—		16	2
Beijing Renhe	2016	China League One	24	4	0	0	—		—		39	10
Beijing Renhe	Total		88	17	8	3	9	0	—		105	20
Career total			431	117	31	12	41	7	2	0	505	136

=== International ===
Appearances and goals by national team and year
National team	Year	Apps	Goals
Bosnia and Herzegovina	2004	6	2
Bosnia and Herzegovina	2005	9	1
Bosnia and Herzegovina	2006	8	5
Bosnia and Herzegovina	2007	8	1
Bosnia and Herzegovina	2008	7	4
Bosnia and Herzegovina	2009	7	2
Bosnia and Herzegovina	2010	9	1
Bosnia and Herzegovina	2011	10	4
Bosnia and Herzegovina	2012	8	4
Bosnia and Herzegovina	2013	7	1
Bosnia and Herzegovina	2014	4	0
Bosnia and Herzegovina	2018	1	0
Total		84	25

=== International goals ===
Scores and results list Bosnia and Herzegovina's goal tally first, score column indicates score after each Misimović goal.

List of international goals scored by Zvjezdan Misimović
No.	Date	Venue	Opponent	Score	Result	Competition
1	31 March 2004	Stade Josy Barthel, Luxembourg City, Luxembourg	Luxembourg	1–0	2–1	Friendly
2	28 April 2004	Bilino Polje, Zenica, Bosnia and Herzegovina	Finland	1–0	1–0	Friendly
3	8 June 2005	Estadio Mestalla, Valencia, Spain	Spain	1–0	1–1	2006 FIFA World Cup qualification
4	28 February 2006	Signal Iduna Park, Dortmund, Germany	Japan	1–1	2–2	Friendly
5	31 May 2006	Azadi Stadium‚ Tehran, Iran	Iran	1–0	2–5	Friendly
6	2 September 2006	Ta' Qali Stadium, Ta' Qali, Malta	Malta	5–1	5–2	UEFA Euro 2008 qualifying
7	6 September 2006	Bilino Polje, Zenica, Bosnia and Herzegovina	Hungary	1–3	1–3	UEFA Euro 2008 qualifying
8	7 October 2006	Zimbru Stadium, Chişinău, Moldova	Moldova	1–2	2–2	UEFA Euro 2008 qualifying
9	24 March 2007	Ullevaal Stadion, Oslo, Norway	Norway	1–0	2–1	UEFA Euro 2008 qualifying
10	19 November 2008	Ljudski vrt, Maribor, Slovenia	Slovenia	2–1	4–3	Friendly
11	10 September 2008	Bilino Polje, Zenica, Bosnia and Herzegovina	Estonia	1–0	7–0	2010 FIFA World Cup qualification
12	10 September 2008	Bilino Polje, Zenica, Bosnia and Herzegovina	Estonia	2–0	7–0	2010 FIFA World Cup qualification
13	10 September 2008	Bilino Polje, Zenica, Bosnia and Herzegovina	Estonia	3–0	7–0	2010 FIFA World Cup qualification
14	28 March 2009	Cristal Arena, Genk, Belgium	Belgium	4–1	4–2	2010 FIFA World Cup qualification
15	14 October 2009	Bilino Polje, Zenica, Bosnia and Herzegovina	Spain	2–5	2–5	2010 FIFA World Cup qualification
16	10 December 2010	Mardan Sports Complex, Antalya, Turkey	Poland	2–2	2–2	Friendly
17	6 September 2011	Bilino Polje, Zenica, Bosnia and Herzegovina	Belarus	1–0	1–0	UEFA Euro 2012 qualifying
18	7 October 2011	Bilino Polje, Zenica, Bosnia and Herzegovina	Luxembourg	2–0	5–0	UEFA Euro 2012 qualifying
19	7 October 2011	Bilino Polje, Zenica, Bosnia and Herzegovina	Luxembourg	3–0	5–0	UEFA Euro 2012 qualifying
20	15 November 2011	Estádio da Luz, Lisbon, Portugal	Portugal	1–2	2–6	UEFA Euro 2012 qualifying play-offs
21	7 September 2012	Rheinpark Stadion, Vaduz, Liechtenstein	Liechtenstein	1–0	8–1	2014 FIFA World Cup qualification
22	7 September 2012	Rheinpark Stadion, Vaduz, Liechtenstein	Liechtenstein	2–0	8–1	2014 FIFA World Cup qualification
23	11 September 2012	Bilino Polje, Zenica, Bosnia and Herzegovina	Latvia	1–1	4–1	2014 FIFA World Cup qualification
24	11 September 2012	Bilino Polje, Zenica, Bosnia and Herzegovina	Latvia	3–1	4–1	2014 FIFA World Cup qualification
25	11 October 2013	Bilino Polje, Zenica, Bosnia and Herzegovina	Liechtenstein	2–0	4–1	2014 FIFA World Cup qualification

== Honours ==
Bayern Munich II

- Regionalliga: 2003–04

Bayern Munich

- Bundesliga: 2002–03

VfL Bochum

- 2. Bundesliga: 2005–06

VfL Wolfsburg

- Bundesliga: 2008–09

Guizhou Renhe

- Chinese FA Cup: 2013
- Chinese Super Cup: 2014

Individual

- Bosnian Footballer of the Year: 2007, 2013
- Vereinigung der Vertragsfussballspieler best XI: 2008–09
- Bosnian Sportsman of the Year: 2013
- Regionalliga top goalscorer: 2003–04
- Bundesliga top assist provider: 2008–09
