= Benjamin Baltes =

German footballer (born 1984)

Personal information
- Date of birth: 30 March 1984 (age 42)
- Place of birth: Saarbrücken, West Germany
- Height: 1.76 m (5 ft 9 in)
- Position: Midfielder

Youth career
- Borussia M'gladbach
- –2000: MSV Duisburg

Senior career*
Years	Team	Apps	(Gls)
2002–2005	KFC Uerdingen 05	71	(9)
2005–2006	SC Freiburg	15	(0)
2006–2007	VfB Lübeck	43	(1)
2008	Rot-Weiss Essen	4	(0)
2008–2009	Erzgebirge Aue	10	(0)
2009–2010	Borussia Mönchengladbach II	15	(1)
2010–2011	Excelsior	10	(0)
2011–2012	Wuppertaler SV	25	(0)
2012–2014	KFC Uerdingen 05	47	(10)
Total		240	(21)

International career
2003	Germany U20	2	(0)
- * Club domestic league appearances and goals

Benjamin Baltes (born 30 March 1984) is a German former professional footballer who played as a midfielder.

== Career ==
Baltes was born in Saarbrücken.

He began playing for KFC Uerdingen 05 in 2002, having switched from the youth team to the first team. Just after he achieved a Player of the Year award for Uerdingen, he found himself on the move, unhappy that he would be playing third division football. He decided to move to SC Freiburg, where he was contracted until 2008.

In August 2006, after trialling with TuS Koblenz, he switched to VfB Lübeck, where he played for eighteen months, before moving to Rot-Weiss Essen. He then joined Aue in 2008 and was released on 30 June 2009.

After trialling with the club, Baltes signed with Eredivisie team SBV Excelsior.

In July 2011, he joined the German Regionalliga West side Wuppertaler SV.

In 2020 he returned to former club KFC Uerdingen 05.

Baltes played for the Germany U20 national team.
