= René Renno =

German footballer

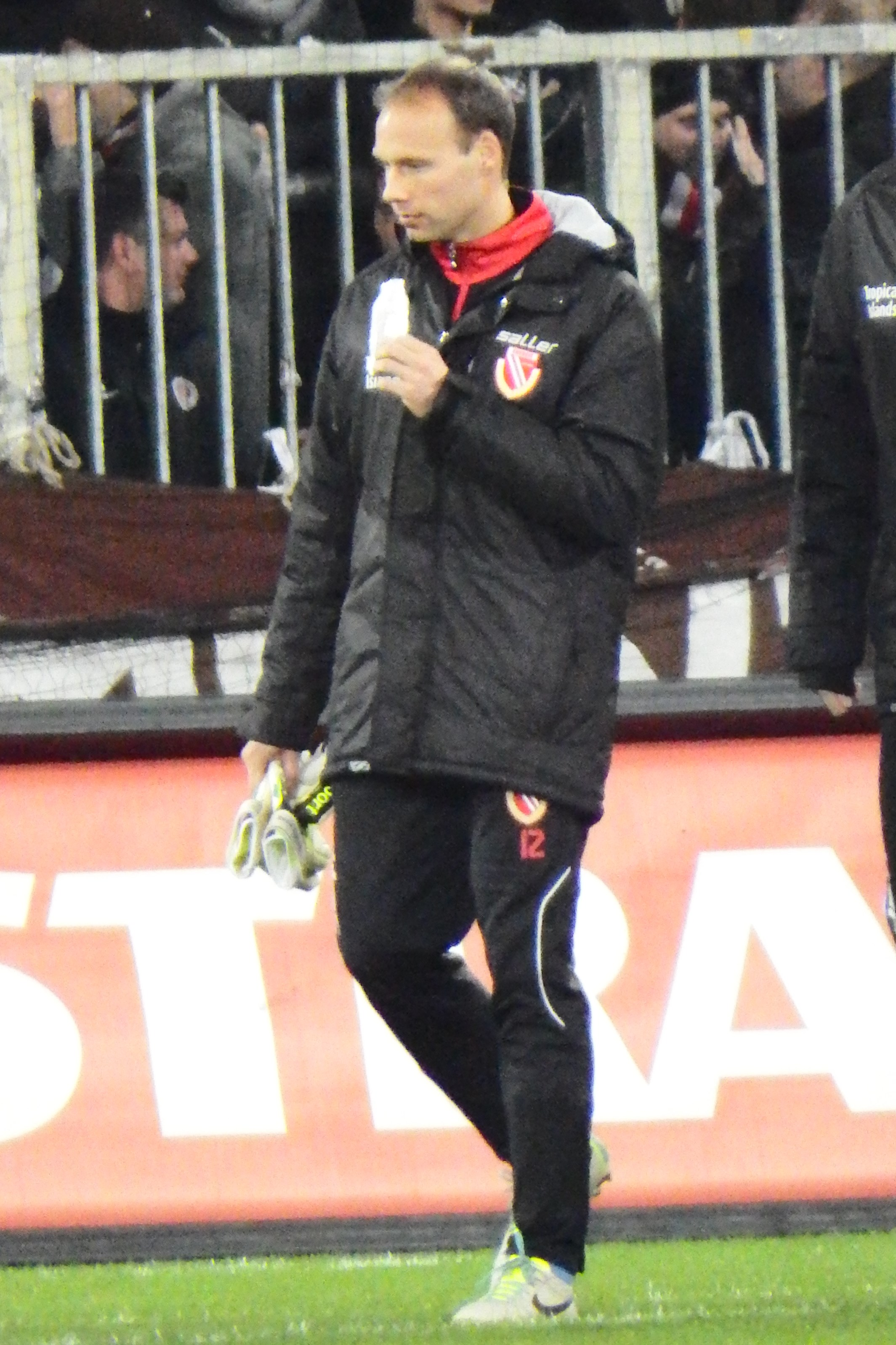
- Renno with Energie Cottbus in 2013

Personal information
- Full name: René Renno
- Date of birth: 19 February 1979 (age 47)
- Place of birth: West Berlin, West Germany
- Height: 1.86 m (6 ft 1 in)
- Position: Goalkeeper

Youth career
- –1990: SV Norden-Nordwest
- 1990–1999: Hertha BSC

Senior career*
Years	Team	Apps	(Gls)
1999–2000	Hertha BSC II	50	(0)
2000–2001	Tennis Borussia Berlin	32	(0)
2001–2003	SG Wattenscheid 09	47	(0)
2003–2005	Rot-Weiss Essen	34	(0)
2005–2010	VfL Bochum	14	(0)
2005–2010	→ VfL Bochum II	10	(0)
2010–	Energie Cottbus	44	(0)
2010–	→ Energie Cottbus II	5	(0)
Total		236	(0)
- * Club domestic league appearances and goals

René Renno (born 19 February 1979) is a German former professional footballer who played as a goalkeeper.

== Career statistics ==
Appearances and goals by club, season and competition
Club	Season	League			DFB-Pokal		Total	
Club	Season	Division	Apps	Goals	Apps	Goals	Apps	Goals
Hertha BSC II	1998–99	NOFV-Oberliga Nord	20	0	—		20	0
Hertha BSC II	1999–00	Regionalliga Nordost	30	0	—		30	0
Hertha BSC II	Total		50	0	0	0	50	0
Tennis Borussia Berlin	2000–01	Regionalliga Nord	32	0	1	0	33	0
SG Wattenscheid 09	2001–02	Regionalliga Nord	34	0	—		34	0
SG Wattenscheid 09	2002–03	Regionalliga Nord	13	0	—		13	0
SG Wattenscheid 09	Total		47	0	0	0	47	0
Rot-Weiss Essen	2003–04	Regionalliga Nord	2	0	—		2	0
Rot-Weiss Essen	2004–05	2. Bundesliga	32	0	0	0	32	0
Rot-Weiss Essen	Total		34	0	0	0	34	0
VfL Bochum	2005–06	2. Bundesliga	3	0	0	0	3	0
VfL Bochum	2006–07	Bundesliga	0	0	0	0	0	0
VfL Bochum	2007–08	Bundesliga	10	0	0	0	10	0
VfL Bochum	2008–09	Bundesliga	1	0	0	0	1	0
VfL Bochum	2009–10	Bundesliga	0	0	0	0	0	0
VfL Bochum	Total		14	0	0	0	14	0
VfL Bochum II	2005–06	Oberliga Westfalen	0	0	1	0	1	0
VfL Bochum II	2006–07	Oberliga Westfalen	0	0	—		0	0
VfL Bochum II	2007–08	Oberliga Westfalen	2	0	—		2	0
VfL Bochum II	2008–09	Regionalliga West	6	0	—		6	0
VfL Bochum II	2009–10	Regionalliga West	2	0	—		2	0
VfL Bochum II	Total		10	0	1	0	11	0
Energie Cottbus	2010–11	2. Bundesliga	2	0	0	0	2	0
Energie Cottbus	2011–12	2. Bundesliga	7	0	1	0	8	0
Energie Cottbus	2012–13	2. Bundesliga	2	0	0	0	2	0
Energie Cottbus	2013–14	2. Bundesliga	16	0	0	0	16	0
Energie Cottbus	2014–15	2. Bundesliga	1	0	0	0	1	0
Energie Cottbus	2015–16	2. Bundesliga	16	0	0	0	16	0
Energie Cottbus	Total		44	0	1	0	45	0
Energie Cottbus II	2010–11	Regionalliga Nord	2	0	—		2	0
Energie Cottbus II	2012–13	Regionalliga Nordost	3	0	—		3	0
Energie Cottbus II	Total		5	0	0	0	5	0
Career total			236	0	3	0	239	0
