= Faruk Gül (footballer) =

German footballer

Personal information
- Date of birth: 15 August 1988 (age 38)
- Place of birth: Steinfurt, Germany
- Height: 1.71 m (5 ft 7 in)
- Position: Midfielder

Youth career
- Preußen Borghorst
- Borussia Emsdetten
- Preußen Münster
- LR Ahlen
- 2005–2007: VfL Bochum

Senior career*
Years	Team	Apps	(Gls)
2005–2007	VfL Bochum II		
2007–2009	SC Pfullendorf	48	(4)
2009–2011	1. FC Heidenheim 1846	34	(1)
2011–2019	FC Schaffhausen		
- * Club domestic league appearances and goals

Faruk Gül (born 15 August 1988) is a German former professional football who played as a midfielder.
