= Haluk Türkeri =

Turkish footballer

Personal information
- Full name: Haluk Türkeri
- Date of birth: 7 November 1986 (age 40)
- Place of birth: Duisburg, West Germany
- Height: 1.87 m (6 ft 1 1/2 in)
- Position: Forward

Team information
- Current team: Adıyaman 1954

Youth career
- –2002: MSV Duisburg
- 2002–2005: VfL Bochum

Senior career*
Years	Team	Apps	(Gls)
2005–2006	VfL Bochum II	26	(6)
2005–2006	VfL Bochum	1	(0)
2006–2008	Karlsruher SC II	24	(3)
2008–2009	Rot-Weiss Essen	15	(2)
2009–2010	SV Elversberg	21	(1)
2010–2011	SV Darmstadt 98	8	(1)
2011	MSV Duisburg II	16	(6)
2012–2013	Denizlispor	29	(4)
2013–2014	Samsunspor	19	(2)
2014	→ Boluspor (loan)	4	(0)
2014–2015	Menemenspor	30	(13)
2015–2016	Tuzlaspor	34	(6)
2016–2017	Aydınspor 1923	16	(2)
2017	Menemenspor	14	(8)
2017–2019	Bandırmaspor	21	(5)
2019–	Kahramanmaraşspor	26	(9)
2020–	Adıyaman 1954	0	(0)
- * Club domestic league appearances and goals as of 15 March 2020

Haluk Türkeri (born 7 November 1986) is a Turkish football forward who plays for Adıyaman 1954 SK.

Club performance			League		Cup		Total	
Season	Club	League	Apps	Goals	Apps	Goals	Apps	Goals
Germany			League		DFB-Pokal		Total	
2005–06	VfL Bochum II	Oberliga Westfalen	26	6	0	0	26	6
2005–06	VfL Bochum	2. Bundesliga	1	0	0	0	1	0
2006–07	Karlsruher SC II	Regionalliga Süd	20	3	—		20	3
2007–08	Karlsruher SC II	Regionalliga Süd	4	0	—		4	0
2008–09	Rot-Weiss Essen	Regionalliga West	15	2	1	0	16	2
2009–10	SV Elversberg	Regionalliga West	21	1	1	0	22	1
2010–11	SV Darmstadt 98	Regionalliga Süd	8	1	—		8	1
Total	Germany		95	13	2	0	97	13
Career total			95	13	2	0	97	13
