= Joris Van Hout =

Belgian footballer

Personal information
- Date of birth: 10 January 1977 (age 49)
- Place of birth: Mol, Belgium
- Height: 1.86 m (6 ft 1 in)
- Position: Forward

Senior career*
Years	Team	Apps	(Gls)
1993–1998	Dessel Sport	103	(24)
1998–2001	Mechelen	99	(33)
2001–2002	Anderlecht	11	(2)
2002–2005	Borussia Mönchengladbach	69	(11)
2005–2007	VfL Bochum	39	(6)
2007–2012	Westerlo	88	(5)
2012–2014	Dessel Sport	48	(0)
Total		457	(81)

International career
2002	Belgium	1	(0)
- * Club domestic league appearances and goals

Joris Van Hout (born 10 January 1977) is a Belgian former professional footballer who played as a forward.

== Career ==
Playing for Borussia Mönchengladbach van Hout scored 11 goals in 69 Bundesliga appearances.

In summer 2005, he left Mönchengladbach for an undisclosed fee to join VfL Bochum on a three-year contract. He made 39 appearances for Bochum in two seasons, with all his six league goals coming in their 2005–06 promotion-winning campaign.

In June 2007, van Hout returned to his home country Belgium agreeing to a four-year contract with Westerlo.

== Honours ==
Anderlecht

- Belgian Super Cup: 2001
