= Alexander Thamm =

German retired footballer (born 1983)

Personal information
- Full name: Alexander Thamm
- Date of birth: 6 May 1983 (age 43)
- Place of birth: Hattingen, West Germany
- Height: 1.91 m (6 ft 3 in)
- Position: Defender

Youth career
- 1988–1992: DJK Märkisch Hattingen
- 1992–2001: VfL Bochum

Senior career*
| Years | Team | Apps | (Gls) |
| 2001–2006 | VfL Bochum II | 125 | (30) |
| 2003–2005 | VfL Bochum | 3 | (0) |
| 2006–2007 | Preußen Münster | 21 | (1) |
| 2007 | SpVgg Erkenschwick | 18 | (4) |
| 2008–2009 | Schalke 04 II | 45 | (8) |
| 2009–2010 | Sportfreunde Lotte | 30 | (5) |
| 2010–2011 | Rot-Weiss Essen | 33 | (6) |
| 2011–2012 | Rot Weiss Ahlen | 15 | (0) |
| 2012–2014 | SG Wattenscheid 09 | 66 | (9) |
| 2014–2015 | Wuppertaler SV | 33 | (6) |
| 2015–2016 | TSV Marl-Hüls | 12 | (1) |
| 2016–2017 | TSV Marl-Hüls II | 26 | (2) |
| 2017–2018 | SV Horst-Emscher | 18 | (5) |
| Total | | 445 | (77) |

Managerial career
- 2016–2017: TSV Marl-Hüls II
- 2017–2018: SV Horst-Emscher
- 2018–: TuS Ennepetal
- * Club domestic league appearances and goals

Alexander Thamm (born 6 May 1983 in Hattingen) is a German retired footballer.

== Career ==
He made his professional debut in the Bundesliga on March 22, 2003, when he started a game for VfL Bochum against VfL Wolfsburg. On 26 May 2009 announced his departure from the reserve of FC Schalke 04 and signed with Sportfreunde Lotte. After he played one year in Lotte and one year for Rot-Weiss Essen, he signed a contract with Rot Weiss Ahlen.
