= David Zajas =

German footballer and coach

Personal information
- Date of birth: 1 May 1983 (age 43)
- Place of birth: Świerklaniec, Poland
- Height: 1.66 m (5 ft 5 in)
- Position: Midfielder

Youth career
- SuS Hüsten 09
- –1998: TuS Sundern
- 1998–2002: VfL Bochum

Senior career*
| Years | Team | Apps | (Gls) |
| 2002–2009 | VfL Bochum II | 211 | (0) |
| 2002–2009 | VfL Bochum | 1 | (0) |
| 2009–2010 | SSVg Velbert | 15 | (0) |
| 2010–2011 | FC Wegberg-Beeck | 23 | (0) |
| 2011–2014 | SG Wattenscheid 09 | 96 | (2) |
| 2014–2015 | VfL Bochum II | 30 | (0) |
| Total | | 376 | (2) |

Managerial career
- 2011–2014: SG Wattenscheid 09 (player assistant)
- 2015–2016: VfL Bochum (youth coach)
- 2016–2017: VfL Bochum U17 (assistant)
- 2017–2018: DJK TuS Hordel
- 2020–: Wuppertaler SV U19
- * Club domestic league appearances and goals

David Zajas (born 1 May 1983, in Świerklaniec) is a German football coach and retired footballer of Polish origin. He is currently working as a manager for Wuppertaler SV U19.

== Career ==
He was with Bochum from 1998 to 2009, but mostly played for the second team VfL Bochum II in the lower leagues. His only, as of 2013, top level Bundesliga appearance came on 17 May 2003, when he came on as a substitute in the 79th minute in a game against Hamburger SV.

=== Statistics ===
| Club performance | | | League | | Cup | | Total | |
| Season | Club | League | Apps | Goals | Apps | Goals | Apps | Goals |
| Germany | | | League | | DFB-Pokal | | Total | |
|---|---|---|---|---|---|---|---|---|
| 2001–02 | VfL Bochum II | Oberliga Westfalen | 6 | 0 | — | | 6 | 0 |
| 2002–03 | VfL Bochum II | Oberliga Westfalen | 29 | 0 | — | | 29 | 0 |
| 2003–04 | VfL Bochum II | Oberliga Westfalen | 29 | 0 | — | | 29 | 0 |
| 2004–05 | VfL Bochum II | Oberliga Westfalen | 31 | 0 | — | | 31 | 0 |
| 2005–06 | VfL Bochum II | Oberliga Westfalen | 32 | 0 | 1 | 0 | 33 | 0 |
| 2006–07 | VfL Bochum II | Oberliga Westfalen | 31 | 0 | — | | 31 | 0 |
| 2007–08 | VfL Bochum II | Oberliga Westfalen | 32 | 0 | — | | 32 | 0 |
| 2008–09 | VfL Bochum II | Regionalliga West | 21 | 0 | — | | 21 | 0 |
| 2002–03 | VfL Bochum | Bundesliga | 1 | 0 | 0 | 0 | 1 | 0 |
| 2009–10 | SSVg Velbert | NRW-Liga | 14 | 0 | — | | 14 | 0 |
| 2010–11 | FC Wegberg-Beeck | NRW-Liga | 23 | 0 | — | | 23 | 0 |
| 2011–12 | SG Wattenscheid 09 | Westfalenliga | 32 | 0 | — | | 32 | 0 |
| 2012–13 | SG Wattenscheid 09 | Oberliga Westfalen | 32 | 1 | — | | 32 | 1 |
| 2013–14 | SG Wattenscheid 09 | Regionalliga West | 32 | 0 | — | | 32 | 0 |
| 2014–15 | VfL Bochum II | Regionalliga West | 30 | 0 | — | | 30 | 0 |
| Total | Germany | | 375 | 1 | 1 | 0 | 376 | 1 |
| Career total | | | 375 | 1 | 1 | 0 | 376 | 1 |
