= Sebastian Hille =

German football coach and former player (born 1980)

Personal information
- Full name: Sebastian Hille
- Date of birth: 19 October 1980 (age 46)
- Place of birth: Soest, West Germany
- Height: 1.78 m (5 ft 10 in)
- Position: Striker

Team information
- Current team: Arminia Bielefeld U19 (assistant)

Youth career
- –1996: Jahn Soest
- 1996–1998: Hammer SpVg
- 1998–2000: Arminia Bielefeld

Senior career*
Years	Team	Apps	(Gls)
2000–2002	FC Gütersloh 2000		
2002–2003	SV Hövelhof	21	(12)
2003–2004	FC Gütersloh	18	(1)
2004–2006	VfL Bochum II	63	(36)
2006–2007	VfL Bochum	2	(0)
2007–2010	Borussia Dortmund II	93	(14)
2010–2011	Rot Weiss Ahlen	33	(6)
2011–2015	Arminia Bielefeld	98	(19)

Managerial career
- 2015–: Arminia Bielefeld U19 (assistant)
- * Club domestic league appearances and goals

Sebastian Hille (born 19 October 1980) is a German football coach and former player. In 2015, he became assistant manager of the Arminia Bielefeld U19.

== Career ==
Hille was born in Soest. He made two appearances for VfL Bochum in the Bundesliga before joining Borussia Dortmund II.
