= Edu (footballer, born 1981) =

Brazilian footballer

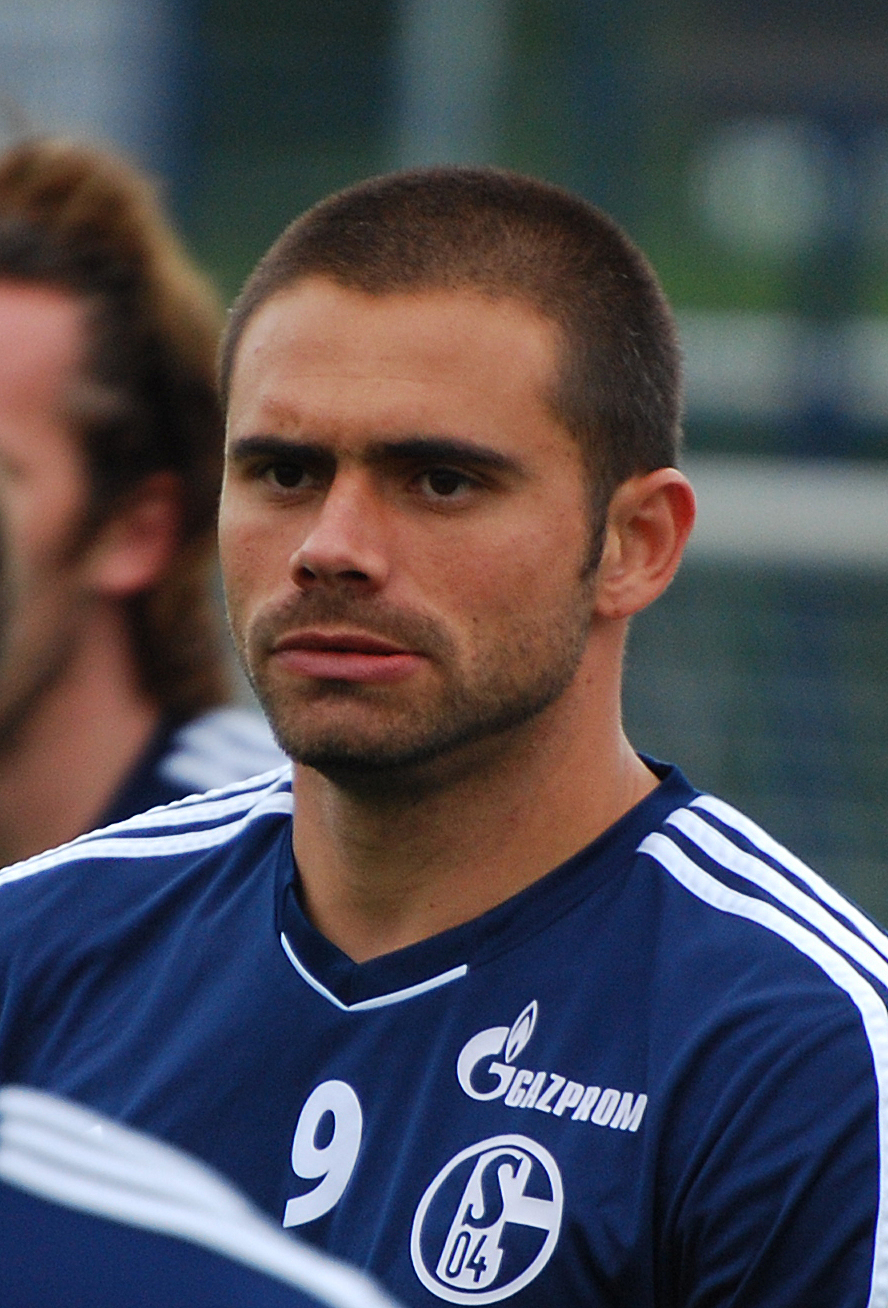
- Edu with Schalke 04 in 2011

Personal information
- Full name: Eduardo Gonçalves de Oliveira
- Date of birth: 30 November 1981 (age 44)
- Place of birth: São Paulo, Brazil
- Height: 1.85 m (6 ft 1 in)
- Position: Striker

Youth career
- 1996–1999: Guarani
- 2000: Santos
- 2001: São Paulo

Senior career*
Years	Team	Apps	(Gls)
2002	Náutico		
2002–2003	CRAC		
2003–2006	VfL Bochum	63	(16)
2006–2007	Mainz 05	14	(1)
2007–2009	Suwon Samsung Bluewings	73	(26)
2010–2013	Schalke 04	43	(5)
2011–2012	→ Beşiktaş (loan)	25	(3)
2012	→ Greuther Fürth (loan)	10	(1)
2013	Liaoning Whowin	23	(14)
2014	FC Tokyo	30	(11)
2015	Jeonbuk Hyundai	20	(11)
2015	Hebei China Fortune	15	(12)
2016–2017	Jeonbuk Hyundai	42	(14)
Total		358	(114)
- * Club domestic league appearances and goals

Eduardo Gonçalves de Oliveira (born 30 November 1981), commonly known as Edu, is a Brazilian former professional footballer who played as a striker.

== Career ==
=== Beşiktaş ===
Edu did not start the season well and Carlos Carvalhal benched him for months. He scored a great goal in the last group stage match against Stoke City in UEFA Europa League and Beşiktaş finished first in the group. His first league goal came against Samsunspor in a penalty kick in December 2011. His second goal came in the BJK İnönü Stadium against rivals Bursaspor.

=== Liaoning Whowin ===
Edu moved to Chinese Super League club Liaoning Whowin on 28 February 2013. He scored his first goal on his debut for Liaoning.

=== Hebei China Fortune ===
On 9 July 2015, Edu transferred to China League One side Hebei China Fortune.

== Career statistics ==
Appearances and goals by club, season and competition
Club	Season	League			Cup		Continental		Other		Total	
Club	Season	Division	Apps	Goals	Apps	Goals	Apps	Goals	Apps	Goals	Apps	Goals
VfL Bochum	2003–04	Bundesliga	13	0	—		—		—		13	0
VfL Bochum	2004–05	Bundesliga	17	4	2	0	1	0	—		20	4
VfL Bochum	2005–06	2. Bundesliga	33	12	2	1	—		—		35	13
VfL Bochum	Total		63	16	4	1	1	0	0	0	68	17
Mainz 05	2006–07	Bundesliga	14	1	1	0	—		—		15	1
Suwon Bluewings	2007	K League 1	23 (Note: Includes appearances in the K-League Championship Playoffs)	6	2	1	—		11 (Note: Appearances in K-League Cup)	1	36	8
Suwon Bluewings	2008	K League 1	27	13	2	1	—		11	3	40	17
Suwon Bluewings	2009	K League 1	23	7	3	1	4	4	—		30	12
Suwon Bluewings	Total		73	26	7	3	4	4	22	4	106	37
Schalke 04	2009–10	Bundesliga	13	2	0	0	—		—		13	2
Schalke 04	2010–11	Bundesliga	28	3	3	0	8	2	1 (Note: Appearance in Supercup)	0	40	5
Schalke 04	2011–12	Bundesliga	1	0	0	0	—		1	0	2	0
Schalke 04	2012–13	Bundesliga	1	0	1	0	—		—		2	0
Schalke 04	Total		43	5	4	0	8	2	2	0	57	7
Beşiktaş (loan)	2011–12	Süper Lig	25	3	—		7	2	—		32	5
Greuther Fürth (loan)	2012–13	Bundesliga	10	1	0	0	—		—		10	1
Liaoning Whowin	2013	Chinese Super League	23	14	2	3	—		—		25	17
FC Tokyo	2014	J1 League	30	11	3	2	—		5 (Note: Appearances in League Cup)	4	38	17
Jeonbuk Hyundai	2015	K League 1	20	11	2	1	8	3	—		30	15
Hebei China Fortune	2015	China League One	15	12	0	0	—		—		15	12
Jeonbuk Hyundai	2016	K League 1	11	1	0	0	4	0	1 (Note: Appearance in FIFA Club WC)	0	16	1
Jeonbuk Hyundai	2017	K League 1	31	13	1	0	—		—		32	13
Jeonbuk Hyundai	Total		42	14	1	0	4	0	1	0	48	14
Career total			358	114	24	10	32	11	30	8	444	143

== Honours ==
Suwon Samsung Bluewings

- K League 1: 2008
- League Cup: 2008
- FA Cup: 2009
- Pan-Pacific Championship: 2009

Schalke 04

- DFB-Pokal: 2010–11
- DFL-Supercup: 2011

Jeonbuk Hyundai Motors

- K League 1: 2015, 2017
- AFC Champions League: 2016
