= China (footballer, born 1980) =

Brazilian footballer

Personal information
- Full name: Leonardo Bruno dos Santos Silva
- Date of birth: August 14, 1980 (age 46)
- Place of birth: Rio de Janeiro, Brazil
- Height: 1.74 m (5 ft 9 in)
- Position: Right back

Youth career
- 1998–2000: Bangu

Senior career*
Years	Team	Apps	(Gls)
2000–2001	Bangu		
2001–2002	Palmeiras		
2002–2003	América-RJ		
2003	Bangu		
2003	Volta Redonda		
2003–2004	Bangu		
2004–2005	Flamengo	32	(1)
2005	→ VfL Bochum (loan)	16	(0)
2005–2006	Paysandu		
2006	Coritiba		
2006–2007	Avaí		
2007–2008	Madureira		
2008–2009	Paços Ferreira	13	(0)
2009–2010	Volta Redonda		
2010–2011	Bangu		
2011	ABC		
2012	Operário Ferroviário		
2013–	Bonsucesso		
- * Club domestic league appearances and goals

Leonardo Bruno dos Santos Silva known as China (born August 14, 1980, in Rio de Janeiro, Brazil) is a Brazilian footballer who played as a right back.

== Career ==
Dos Santos Silva is a strong right-back who began his football career with Bangor and had spells with Palmeiras, América-RJ and Volta Redonda before he joined Flamengo in 2004.

In 2005, he moved to VfL Bochum. China helped the German club to rise to the first division and gained some prominence in European football. However, he preferred to return to Brazil in 2006 to Paysandu, Campeonato Paraense defending champions, then go through Coritiba, Avaí and in 2008, competed in the Campeonato Carioca at Madureira.

Later that year, after the state fair, China joined the European club Paços Ferreira, Portugal, signing a contract for two years. He was released before the end of the contract. A major factor in the withdrawal from the Portuguese club was a knee ligament problem that haunted him for some time.

After spending most of 2008 and 2009 without any action, China was hired by the Volta Redonda to compete in the Campeonato Carioca 2010 and later that year ended up going to Bangu, where he played the Série D of the Brazilian Championship.

After his contract with Bangu was done, China joined Série B side ABC on May 18, 2011.
