= Polat Keser =

German–born Turkish football goalkeeper (born 1985)

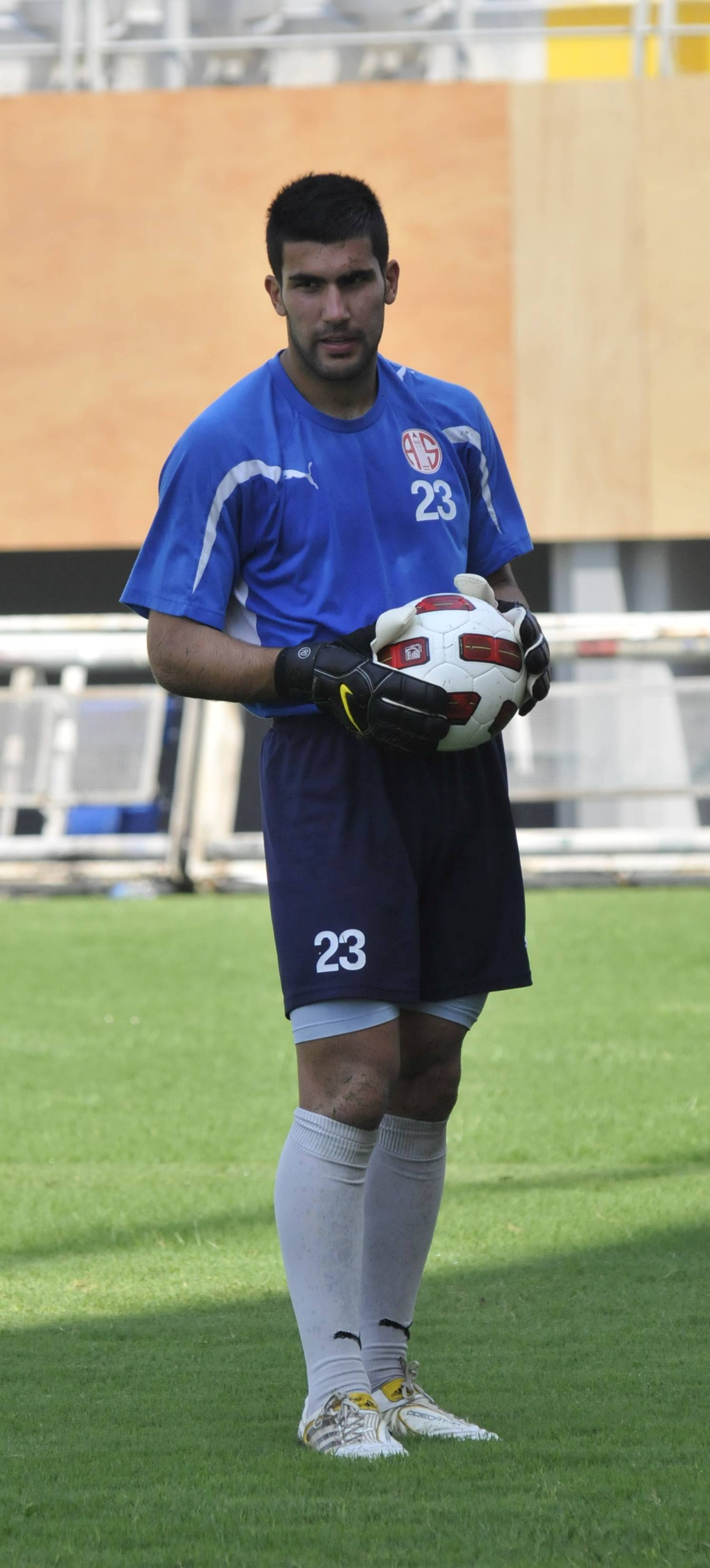

Personal information
- Date of birth: 4 December 1985 (age 40)
- Place of birth: Marl, West Germany
- Height: 1.85 m (6 ft 1 in)
- Position: Goalkeeper

Team information
- Current team: Ceyhanspor

Youth career
- –2000: TSV Marl-Hüls
- 2000–2002: FC Schalke 04
- 2002–2004: VfL Bochum

Senior career*
Years	Team	Apps	(Gls)
2004–2005	VfL Bochum	0	(0)
2004–2007	VfL Bochum II	33	(0)
2007–2014	Antalyaspor	7	(0)
2014	Adanaspor	1	(0)
2014–2015	Hatayspor	11	(0)
2015–2016	Tokatspor	22	(0)
2017	Kırklarelispor	5	(0)
2017–	Ceyhanspor	?	(?)
- * Club domestic league appearances and goals as of 11 February 2018

Polat Keser (born 4 December 1985 in Marl) is a German–born Turkish football goalkeeper who plays for Ceyhanspor.

== Career ==
=== Statistics ===
Club performance			League		Cup		Total	
Season	Club	League	Apps	Goals	Apps	Goals	Apps	Goals
Germany			League		DFB-Pokal		Total	
2004–05	VfL Bochum	Bundesliga	0	0	0	0	0	0
2004–05	VfL Bochum II	Oberliga Westfalen	17	0	—		17	0
2005–06	VfL Bochum II	Oberliga Westfalen	16	0	0	0	16	0
2006–07	VfL Bochum II	Oberliga Westfalen	0	0	—		0	0
Turkey			League		Turkish Cup		Total	
2006–07	Antalyaspor	Süper Lig	0	0	0	0	0	0
2007–08	Antalyaspor	First League	0	0	0	0	0	0
2008–09	Antalyaspor	Süper Lig	0	0	0	0	0	0
2009–10	Antalyaspor	Süper Lig	2	0	2	0	4	0
2010–11	Antalyaspor	Süper Lig	2	0	1	0	3	0
2011–12	Antalyaspor	Süper Lig	1	0	0	0	1	0
2012–13	Antalyaspor	Süper Lig	0	0	0	0	0	0
Total	Germany		33	0	0	0	33	0
Total	Turkey		5	0	3	0	8	0
Career total			38	0	3	0	41	0
