= 2005–06 2. Bundesliga =

32nd season of the second-tier football league in Germany

2. Bundesliga
- Season: 2005–06
- Champions: VfL Bochum
- Promoted: VfL Bochum; Alemannia Aachen; Energie Cottbus
- Relegated: Dynamo Dresden; 1. FC Saarbrücken; LR Ahlen; Sportfreunde Siegen
- Matches played: 306
- Goals scored: 801 (2.62 per match)
- Top goalscorer: Christian Eigler (18)

The 2005–06 2. Bundesliga was the 32nd season of the 2. Bundesliga, the second tier of the German football league system. VfL Bochum, Alemannia Aachen, and Energie Cottbus were promoted to the Bundesliga while Dynamo Dresden, 1. FC Saarbrücken, LR Ahlen, and Sportfreunde Siegen were relegated to the Regionalliga.

== League table ==
For the 2005–06, season Eintracht Braunschweig, SC Paderborn 07, Kickers Offenbach and Sportfreunde Siegen were newly promoted to the 2. Bundesliga from the Regionalliga while VfL Bochum, F.C. Hansa Rostock and SC Freiburg had been relegated to the league from the Bundesliga.

Locations of the participating teams of the 2005–06 season

Pos	Team	Pld	W	D	L	GF	GA	GD	Pts	Promotion or relegation
1	VfL Bochum (C, P)	34	20	7	7	62	33	+29	67	Promotion to Bundesliga
2	Alemannia Aachen (P)	34	20	5	9	61	36	+25	65	Promotion to Bundesliga
3	Energie Cottbus (P)	34	16	10	8	49	33	+16	58	Promotion to Bundesliga
4	SC Freiburg	34	16	8	10	41	33	+8	56	
5	SpVgg Greuther Fürth	34	15	9	10	51	42	+9	54	
6	Karlsruher SC	34	15	8	11	55	45	+10	53	
7	Erzgebirge Aue	34	13	9	12	38	36	+2	48	
8	Wacker Burghausen	34	12	11	11	45	49	−4	47	
9	SC Paderborn	34	13	7	14	46	40	+6	46	
10	Hansa Rostock	34	13	4	17	44	49	−5	43	
11	Kickers Offenbach	34	12	7	15	42	53	−11	43	
12	Eintracht Braunschweig	34	13	4	17	37	48	−11	43	
13	1860 Munich	34	11	9	14	41	44	−3	42	
14	SpVgg Unterhaching	34	12	6	16	42	48	−6	42	
15	Dynamo Dresden (R)	34	11	8	15	39	45	−6	41	Relegation to Regionalliga (Note: Dynamo Dresden and LR Ahlen were relegated to Regionalliga Nord. 1. FC Saarbrücken and Sportfreunde Siegen were relegated to Regionalliga Süd.)
16	1. FC Saarbrücken (R)	34	11	5	18	37	63	−26	38	Relegation to Regionalliga
17	LR Ahlen (R)	34	9	8	17	36	50	−14	35	Relegation to Regionalliga
18	Sportfreunde Siegen (R)	34	8	7	19	35	54	−19	31	Relegation to Regionalliga

Source: Bundesliga.de
Rules for classification: 1) points; 2) goal difference; 3) number of goals scored.
(C) Champions; (P) Promoted; (R) Relegated

== Results ==
Home \ Away	AAC	LRA	AUE	BOC	EBS	WBU	FCE	SGD	SCF	SGF	KSC	M60	KOF	SCP	ROS	FCS	SIE	UNT
Alemannia Aachen	—	6–2	3–1	0–2	2–1	2–0	0–0	2–0	0–1	0–1	2–1	1–0	0–1	2–1	3–2	4–0	3–0	1–0
LR Ahlen	0–2	—	3–1	2–2	3–0	2–2	0–1	0–0	0–0	1–2	2–2	1–2	1–0	0–2	1–3	3–1	0–1	1–0
Erzgebirge Aue	2–1	0–0	—	0–1	0–2	1–1	2–2	2–0	1–0	1–1	0–0	3–0	1–0	1–0	2–1	2–0	0–2	0–1
VfL Bochum	1–4	3–0	1–0	—	4–0	1–2	2–2	1–0	4–0	1–1	2–3	1–0	0–1	1–1	1–0	3–0	3–1	1–0
Eintracht Braunschweig	0–1	3–1	0–1	0–0	—	1–2	0–1	1–0	0–0	3–0	1–0	3–3	2–0	2–0	4–1	1–2	1–0	3–0
Wacker Burghausen	1–1	1–3	1–1	0–4	1–2	—	0–1	1–0	2–1	2–2	1–1	1–0 (Note: The Wacker Burghausen v 1860 Munich match from 4 November 2005, which finished with a score of 0–2, was annulled by the DFB on 15 February 2006 and was required to be replayed due to 1860 Munich player Nemanja Vučićević being convicted of taking an illicit substance. The replay took place on 29 March 2006 and finished with a score of 1–0.)	0–2	5–1	1–1	2–0	1–0	1–1
Energie Cottbus	5–1	0–0	1–0	0–1	2–1	4–1	—	0–0	2–1	1–2	0–0	3–1	1–2	1–2	2–0	0–1	1–0	2–0
Dynamo Dresden	1–3	3–1	1–4	0–0	1–1	1–2	1–1	—	2–0	1–2	3–2	2–0	4–1	0–2	1–0	2–0	1–0	2–3
SC Freiburg	0–2	3–0	2–0	0–0	1–0	2–1	4–1	1–0	—	1–0	0–0	2–1	2–0	1–0	2–2	3–1	2–2	3–2
Greuther Fürth	0–0	2–0	1–3	1–3	0–1	6–2	1–1	3–1	1–2	—	3–1	2–2	2–0	1–1	2–0	0–0	1–0	2–0
Karlsruher SC	2–1	3–1	5–2	4–2	7–0	0–1	3–2	2–1	1–1	2–1	—	1–2	1–1	2–3	1–0	2–1	2–0	1–0
1860 Munich	0–0	0–0	1–1	0–1	1–0	1–1	2–3	1–2	0–1	2–2	2–0	—	1–1	1–0	4–1	1–0	3–0	1–4
Kickers Offenbach	2–4	0–3	2–1	0–0	2–0	1–3	2–0	0–0	2–1	2–1	1–3	2–5	—	1–1	1–3	2–3	1–1	4–1
SC Paderborn	3–1	1–0	0–2	1–3	3–0	1–3	0–0	0–2	1–1	1–2	2–0	0–1	4–1	—	3–0	5–0	4–0	1–1
Hansa Rostock	1–0	1–2	1–0	0–2	2–3	1–0	0–0	1–3	1–2	1–2	2–0	3–1	1–2	2–0	—	3–0	2–0	4–2
1. FC Saarbrücken	2–5	1–0	1–1	0–4	2–0	1–1	1–3	5–1	2–1	1–0	1–2	0–0	0–4	0–0	1–2	—	0–3	5–3
Sportfreunde Siegen	2–2	0–3	0–1	3–0	4–1	2–1	2–4	2–2	1–0	1–3	0–0	1–2	1–1	0–2	1–1	0–4	—	4–0
SpVgg Unterhaching	1–2	2–0	1–1	0–0	1–0	1–1	0–2	1–1	1–0	4–1	4–1	1–0	2–0	3–0	0–1	0–1	2–1	—

Source: DFB
Legend: Blue = home team win; Yellow = draw; Red = away team win.

== Top scorers ==
The league's top scorers:

Goals	Player	Team
18	(Germany) Christian Eigler	SpVgg Greuther Fürth
14	(Italy) Giovanni Federico	Karlsruher SC
14	(Slovakia) Marek Krejčí	SV Wacker Burghausen
13	(France) Régis Dorn	Kickers Offenbach
13	(Germany) Marius Ebbers	Alemannia Aachen
12	(Romania) Sergiu Radu	FC Energie Cottbus
12	(Brazil) Edu	VfL Bochum
11	(Bosnia and Herzegovina) Zvjezdan Misimović	VfL Bochum
11	(Turkey) Suat Türker	Kickers Offenbach
11	(Germany) Jan Schlaudraff	Alemannia Aachen
11	(Germany) René Müller	SC Paderborn 07
