= 1999–2000 VfL Bochum season =

VfL Bochum
1999–2000 season
- President: Werner Altegoer
- Head Coach: Ernst Middendorp (until 24 October 1999); Bernard Dietz (ad interim, until 31 December 1999); Ralf Zumdick (since 1 January 2000)
- Stadium: Ruhrstadion
- 2. Bundesliga: 2nd (promoted)
- DFB-Pokal: Quarter-finals
- Top goalscorer: League: Weber (19); All: Weber (22)
- Highest home attendance: 33,063 (vs Borussia Mönchengladbach, 17 April 2000)
- Lowest home attendance: 10,007 (vs Tennis Borussia Berlin, 24 October 1999)
- Average home league attendance: 16,076
| Home colours | Away colours | Third colours |

The 1999–2000 VfL Bochum season was the 62nd season in club history.

== Review and events ==
On 24 October 1999 head coach Ernst Middendorp was sacked. Bernard Dietz was appointed caretaker on 25 October 1999. Ralf Zumdick was appointed head coach on 1 January 2000.

== Matches ==
=== Legend ===
Win Draw Loss

=== 2. Bundesliga ===
| 16 August 1999 1 | Karlsruher SC | 1 – 3 | VfL Bochum | Karlsruhe |
| 20:15 | Krieg 90' | | Weber 10' (pen.); Lust 47'; Peschel 90' | Stadium: Wildparkstadion; Attendance: 15,050; Referee: Helmut Fleischer (Ulm) |

| 20 August 1999 2 | VfL Bochum | 5 – 0 | Alemannia Aachen | Bochum |
| 19:00 | Heeren 12' (o.g.); Peschel 48'; Buckley 60'; Bałuszyński 71'; Weber 76' | | | Stadium: Ruhrstadion; Attendance: 24,063; Referee: Torsten Koop (Lüttenmark) |

| 29 August 1999 3 | FC St. Pauli | 0 – 0 | VfL Bochum | Hamburg |
| 15:00 | | | | Stadium: Millerntor-Stadion; Attendance: 14,863; Referee: Olaf Blumenstein (Berlin) |

| 13 September 1999 4 | VfL Bochum | 2 – 3 | 1. FC Köln | Bochum |
| 20:15 | Weber 21'; Ristau 53' | | Azizi 31'; Kurth 60', 68' | Stadium: Ruhrstadion; Attendance: 25,010; Referee: Michael Wendorf (Gransee) |

| 17 September 1999 5 | Rot-Weiß Oberhausen | 3 – 0 | VfL Bochum | Oberhausen |
| 19:00 | Lipinski 13', 64' (pen.); Vier 89' (pen.) | | | Stadium: Niederrheinstadion; Attendance: 7,556; Referee: Günter Perl (Pullach) |

| 24 September 1999 6 | VfL Bochum | 1 – 2 | SpVgg Greuther Fürth | Bochum |
| 19:00 | Weber 66' | | Sbordone 12'; Meichelbeck 64' | Stadium: Ruhrstadion; Attendance: 12,724; Referee: Peter Gagelmann (Bremen) |

| 3 October 1999 7 | Stuttgarter Kickers | 0 – 0 | VfL Bochum | Stuttgart |
| 15:00 | | | | Stadium: Gazi-Stadion auf der Waldau; Attendance: 3,317; Referee: Burkard Hufgard (Mömbris) |

| 16 October 1999 8 | VfL Bochum | 2 – 4 | FC Energie Cottbus | Bochum |
| 15:30 | Bałuszyński 66'; Weber 76' (pen.) | | Latoundji 34'; Heidrich 57'; Wawrzyczek 61'; Helbig 77' | Stadium: Ruhrstadion; Attendance: 10,907; Referee: Peter Sippel (Munich) |

| 24 October 1999 9 | VfL Bochum | 2 – 6 | Tennis Borussia Berlin | Bochum |
| 15:00 | Weber 29'; Peschel 72' | | Rösler 1', 85', 90'; Tredup 38'; Kiriakov 41'; Copado 57' | Stadium: Ruhrstadion; Attendance: 10,007; Referee: Edgar Steinborn (Sinzig) |

| 1 November 1999 10 | Borussia Mönchengladbach | 0 – 1 | VfL Bochum | Mönchengladbach |
| 20:15 | | | Baştürk 37' | Stadium: Bökelbergstadion; Attendance: 18,000; Referee: Christian Schößling (Leipzig) |

| 5 November 1999 11 | VfL Bochum | 2 – 0 | SV Waldhof Mannheim | Bochum |
| 19:00 | Peschel 26', 50' | | | Stadium: Ruhrstadion; Attendance: 11,310; Referee: Michael Weiner (Giesen) |

| 19 November 1999 12 | Kickers Offenbach | 2 – 1 | VfL Bochum | Offenbach |
| 19:00 | Bundea 52'; Simon 54' | | Weber 66' (pen.) | Stadium: Stadion am Bieberer Berg; Attendance: 12,500; Referee: Jürgen Kreyer (Hilden) |

| 27 November 1999 13 | VfL Bochum | 3 – 0 | Fortuna Köln | Bochum |
| 15:30 | Weber 51', 73'; Vardanyan 87' (o.g.) | | | Stadium: Ruhrstadion; Attendance: 10,199; Referee: Peter Lange (Filderstadt) |

| 5 December 1999 14 | 1. FSV Mainz 05 | 0 – 1 | VfL Bochum | Mainz |
| 15:00 | | | Buckley 44' | Stadium: Bruchwegstadion; Attendance: 6,135; Referee: Knut Kircher (Rottenburg am Neckar) |

| 11 December 1999 15 | VfL Bochum | 2 – 1 | 1. FC Nürnberg | Bochum |
| 15:30 | Schindzielorz 24'; Stoilov 90' (o.g.) | | Leitl 39' | Stadium: Ruhrstadion; Attendance: 14,511; Referee: Volker Wezel (Tübingen) |

| 14 December 1999 16 | Chemnitzer FC | 3 – 3 | VfL Bochum | Chemnitz |
| 19:00 | Dittgen 58', 72'; Skela 68' | | Peschel 9'; Weber 41', 70' | Stadium: Stadion an der Gellertstraße; Attendance: 5,960; Referee: Thomas Frank (Hannover) |

| 9 February 2000 17 | VfL Bochum | 2 – 1 | Hannover 96 | Bochum |
| 19:00 | Peschel 42'; Baştürk 52' | | Milovanovic 47' | Stadium: Ruhrstadion; Attendance: 14,142; Referee: Detlef Schütz (Norken) |

| 14 February 2000 18 | VfL Bochum | 2 – 1 | Karlsruher SC | Bochum |
| 20:15 | Peschel 36'; Dickhaut 76' | | Krieg 64' | Stadium: Ruhrstadion; Attendance: 10,541; Referee: Wolfgang Stark (Ergolding) |

| 20 February 2000 19 | Alemannia Aachen | 0 – 1 | VfL Bochum | Aachen |
| 15:00 | | | Peschel 90' | Stadium: Tivoli; Attendance: 19,600; Referee: Markus Schmidt (Stuttgart) |

| 25 February 2000 20 | VfL Bochum | 2 – 0 | FC St. Pauli | Bochum |
| 19:00 | Peschel 76'; Lust 87' | | | Stadium: Ruhrstadion; Attendance: 15,710; Referee: Dirk Margenberg (Wermelskirchen) |

| 3 March 2000 21 | 1. FC Köln | 3 – 0 | VfL Bochum | Cologne |
| 19:00 | Timm 36'; Springer 62'; Donkov 77' | | | Stadium: Radrennbahn Müngersdorf; Attendance: 35,000; Referee: Jürgen Jansen (Essen) |

| 12 March 2000 22 | VfL Bochum | 1 – 0 | Rot-Weiß Oberhausen | Bochum |
| 15:00 | Weber 85' | | | Stadium: Ruhrstadion; Attendance: 15,945; Referee: Christian Schößling (Leipzig) |

| 18 March 2000 23 | SpVgg Greuther Fürth | 2 – 2 | VfL Bochum | Fürth |
| 15:30 | Walther 26'; Türr 77' | | Bemben 16'; Baştürk 35' | Stadium: Playmobil-Stadion; Attendance: 6,825; Referee: Matthias Anklam (Buchholz in der Nordheide) |

| 25 March 2000 24 | VfL Bochum | 2 – 1 | Stuttgarter Kickers | Bochum |
| 15:30 | Weber 50'; Marić 52' | | Kümmerle 84' | Stadium: Ruhrstadion; Attendance: 14,155; Referee: Ralf Hilmes (Nordhorn) |

| 3 April 2000 25 | FC Energie Cottbus | 1 – 1 | VfL Bochum | Cottbus |
| 20:15 | Rath 82' | | Weber 17' | Stadium: Stadion der Freundschaft; Attendance: 10,697; Referee: Bernd Hauer (Hambühren) |

| 10 April 2000 26 | Tennis Borussia Berlin | 0 – 4 | VfL Bochum | Berlin |
| 20:15 | | | Ristau 48'; Müller 6'; Peschel 64'; Marić 69' | Stadium: Mommsenstadion; Attendance: 3,221; Referee: Knut Kircher (Rottenburg am Neckar) |

| 17 April 2000 27 | VfL Bochum | 2 – 2 | Borussia Mönchengladbach | Bochum |
| 20:15 | Weber 33'; Baştürk 72' | | van Lent 45'; Ketelaer 79' | Stadium: Ruhrstadion; Attendance: 33,063; Referee: Michael Weiner (Giesen) |

| 22 April 2000 28 | SV Waldhof Mannheim | 4 – 2 | VfL Bochum | Mannheim |
| 15:30 | Vata 42', 83'; Licht 55', 78' | | Baştürk 53'; Marić 54' | Stadium: Carl-Benz-Stadion; Attendance: 8,100; Referee: Olaf Blumenstein (Berlin) |

| 28 April 2000 29 | VfL Bochum | 6 – 1 | Kickers Offenbach | Bochum |
| 19:00 | Peschel 7', 88'; Kolinger 45' (o.g.); Dickhaut 70'; Buckley 72'; Toplak 78' | | Dama 41' (pen.) | Stadium: Ruhrstadion; Attendance: 15,600; Referee: Günter Perl (Pullach) |

| 6 May 2000 30 | Fortuna Köln | 2 – 3 | VfL Bochum | Cologne |
| 15:30 | Ibrahim 70'; Ćatić 85' | | Weber 34'; Baştürk 53'; Peschel 65' | Stadium: Südstadion; Attendance: 7,000; Referee: Christian Schößling (Leipzig) |

| 15 May 2000 31 | VfL Bochum | 0 – 1 | 1. FSV Mainz 05 | Bochum |
| 20:15 | | | Demandt 37' | Stadium: Ruhrstadion; Attendance: 14,821; Referee: Bernd Hauer (Hambühren) |

| 18 May 2000 32 | 1. FC Nürnberg | 0 – 1 | VfL Bochum | Nuremberg |
| 20:15 | | | Bałuszyński 83' | Stadium: Frankenstadion; Attendance: 18,500; Referee: Alfons Berg (Konz) |

| 21 May 2000 33 | VfL Bochum | 5 – 1 | Chemnitzer FC | Bochum |
| 15:00 | Weber 9', 25'; Schindzielorz 29'; Peschel 69'; Baştürk 77' | | Kujat 15' | Stadium: Ruhrstadion; Attendance: 20,577; Referee: Stephan Kammerer (Karlsruhe) |

| 26 May 2000 34 | Hannover 96 | 3 – 3 | VfL Bochum | Hannover |
| 19:00 | Blank 29'; Keita 76'; Morinas 90' | | Marić 15'; Ristau 58'; Weber 87' | Stadium: Niedersachsenstadion; Attendance: 8,449; Referee: Markus Schmidt (Stuttgart) |

=== DFB-Pokal ===
| 6 August 1999 R2 | SSV Reutlingen 05 | 2 – 3 | VfL Bochum | Reutlingen |
| 18:30 | Marić 11'; Djappa 36' | | Baştürk 9'; Buckley 20'; Bałuszyński 55' | Stadium: Stadion an der Kreuzeiche; Attendance: 3,610; Referee: Alfons Berg (Konz) |

| 13 October 1999 R3 | VfL Bochum | 1 – 1 (a.e.t.) (6 – 5 p) | MSV Duisburg | Bochum |
| 19:00 | Baştürk 70' | | Spies 86' | Stadium: Ruhrstadion; Attendance: 12,928; Referee: Wolfgang Stark (Ergolding) |
| | Penalties |
| | Reis (penalty scored); Rietpietsch (penalty scored); Stickroth (penalty scored); Lust (penalty scored); Weber (penalty missed); Buckley (penalty scored); Dickhaut (penalty scored) | | Hirsch (penalty scored); Beierle (penalty scored); M. Zeyer (penalty scored); Voss (penalty scored); Hajto (penalty missed); Neun (penalty scored); Wolters (penalty missed) |

| 1 December 1999 R4 | VfL Bochum | 5 – 4 | VfL Wolfsburg | Bochum |
| 19:30 | Weber 41', 43'; Peschel 47' (pen.); Baştürk 58', 90' | | Feldhoff 28'; Thomsen 40'; Akonnor 55', 84' (pen.) | Stadium: Ruhrstadion; Attendance: 10,895; Referee: Lutz Wagner (Kriftel) |

| 21 December 1999 QF | VfL Bochum | 1 – 2 | SV Werder Bremen | Bochum |
| 20:30 | Weber 63' | | Aílton 79', 87' | Stadium: Ruhrstadion; Attendance: 20,063; Referee: Markus Merk (Otterbach) |

== Squad ==
=== Squad and statistics ===
==== Squad, appearances and goals scored ====
| No. | Pos | Nat | Player | Total | | 2. Bundesliga | | DFB-Pokal | |
| No. | Pos | Nat | Player | Apps | Goals | Apps | Goals | Apps | Goals |
|---|---|---|---|---|---|---|---|---|---|
| 1 | GK | (Netherlands) NED | Rein van Duijnhoven | 17 | 0 | 16 | 0 | 1 | 0 |
| 2 | DF | (Croatia) CRO | Samir Toplak | 16 | 1 | 15 | 1 | 1 | 0 |
| 3 | DF | (Germany) GER | Sven Boy | 8 | 0 | 7 | 0 | 1 | 0 |
| 4 | DF | (Germany) GER | Axel Sundermann | 29 | 0 | 25 | 0 | 4 | 0 |
| 5 | DF | (Germany) GER | Thomas Reis | 22 | 1 | 18 | 0 | 4 | 1 |
| 6 | MF | (Germany) GER | Matthias Lust | 22 | 3 | 19 | 2 | 3 | 1 |
| 7 | MF | (Germany) GER | Peter Peschel | 37 | 16 | 34 | 15 | 3 | 1 |
| 8 | MF | (Germany) GER | Sebastian Schindzielorz | 32 | 2 | 29 | 2 | 3 | 0 |
| 9 | FW | (Germany) GER | Achim Weber | 35 | 22 | 31 | 19 | 4 | 3 |
| 10 | MF | (Turkey) TUR | Yıldıray Baştürk | 34 | 11 | 30 | 7 | 4 | 4 |
| 11 | FW | (South Africa) RSA | Delron Buckley | 37 | 5 | 33 | 3 | 4 | 2 |
| 12 | DF | (Germany) GER | Thomas Stickroth | 34 | 1 | 31 | 0 | 3 | 1 |
| 13 | DF | (Germany) GER | Frank Fahrenhorst | 4 | 0 | 4 | 0 | 0 | 0 |
| 14 | DF | (Germany) GER | Mike Rietpietsch | 10 | 1 | 8 | 0 | 2 | 1 |
| 15 | MF | (Germany) GER | Olaf Schreiber | 11 | 0 | 10 | 0 | 1 | 0 |
| 16 | DF | (Germany) GER | Hilko Ristau | 26 | 3 | 23 | 3 | 3 | 0 |
| 17 | FW | (Poland) POL | Henryk Bałuszyński | 14 | 4 | 13 | 3 | 1 | 1 |
| 19 | FW | (Federal Republic of Yugoslavia) YUG | Zdravko Drinčić | 5 | 0 | 5 | 0 | 0 | 0 |
| 20 | FW | (Germany) GER | Björn Joppe | 1 | 0 | 1 | 0 | 0 | 0 |
| 21 | GK | (Germany) GER | Thomas Ernst | 21 | 0 | 18 | 0 | 3 | 0 |
| 22 | FW | (Germany) GER | René Müller | 12 | 1 | 9 | 1 | 3 | 0 |
| 23 | DF | (Germany) GER | Mirko Dickhaut | 35 | 3 | 31 | 2 | 4 | 1 |
| 24 | DF | (Germany) GER | Michael Bemben | 31 | 1 | 28 | 1 | 3 | 0 |
| 25 | MF | (Germany) GER | Jan Majewski | 1 | 0 | 1 | 0 | 0 | 0 |
| 26 | FW | (Poland) POL | Jacek Ratajczak | 0 | 0 | 0 | 0 | 0 | 0 |
| 27 | MF | (Germany) GER | Norbert Hofmann (until 31 October 1999) | 0 | 0 | 0 | 0 | 0 | 0 |
| 27 | FW | (Croatia) CRO | Marijo Marić (since 1 December 1999) | 18 | 4 | 18 | 4 | 0 | 0 |
| 28 | MF | (Germany) GER | Jan Holland | 0 | 0 | 0 | 0 | 0 | 0 |
| 30 | MF | (Germany) GER | Paul Freier | 6 | 0 | 6 | 0 | 0 | 0 |
| 31 | GK | (Germany) GER | Stefan Wächter | 0 | 0 | 0 | 0 | 0 | 0 |
| 41 | GK | (Germany) GER | Klaus Schlapka | 0 | 0 | 0 | 0 | 0 | 0 |

=== Transfers ===
==== Summer ====
In:

| No. | Pos. | Nation | Player |
|---|---|---|---|
| 1 | GK | NED | Rein van Duijnhoven (from MVV Maastricht) |
| 3 | DF | GER | Sven Boy (from Arminia Bielefeld) |
| 6 | MF | GER | Matthias Lust (from SpVgg Unterhaching) |
| 9 | FW | GER | Achim Weber (from Rot-Weiß Oberhausen) |
| 14 | DF | GER | Mike Rietpietsch (from SC Freiburg) |
| 16 | DF | GER | Hilko Ristau (from SG Wattenscheid 09) |
| 17 | FW | POL | Henryk Bałuszyński (loan return from Arminia Bielefeld) |
| 22 | FW | GER | René Müller (from SC Preußen Münster) |
| 30 | MF | GER | Paul Freier (from VfL Bochum II) |

Out:

| No. | Pos. | Nation | Player |
|---|---|---|---|
| 1 | GK | GER | Maik Kischko (to Stuttgarter Kickers) |
| 3 | DF | GER | Torsten Kracht (to Eintracht Frankfurt) |
| 5 | DF | POL | Tomasz Wałdoch (to FC Schalke 04) |
| 7 | MF | GER | Kai Michalke (to Hertha BSC) |
| 10 | MF | GER | Maurizio Gaudino (to Antalyaspor) |
| 11 | FW | GER | Stefan Kuntz (retired) |
| 14 | MF | SVN | Emir Dzafič (to NK Samobor) |
| 15 | MF | GER | Andreas Zeyer (to SC Freiburg) |
| 20 | DF | CRO | Alen Petrović (to NK Slaven Belupo) |
| 24 | FW | TUR | Neşat Gülünoğlu (to A.S. Roma) |
| 32 | MF | ROU | Viorel Ion (to FC Oțelul Galați) |
| 33 | MF | IRN | Mehdi Mahdavikia (to Hamburger SV) |

==== Winter ====
In:

| No. | Pos. | Nation | Player |
|---|---|---|---|
| 27 | FW | CRO | Marijo Marić (from SSV Reutlingen 05) |

Out:

| No. | Pos. | Nation | Player |
|---|---|---|---|
| 27 | MF | GER | Norbert Hofmann (to 1. FC Saarbrücken) |

== VfL Bochum II ==
| No. | Pos | Nat | Player | Total | | Regionalliga West/Südwest | |
| No. | Pos | Nat | Player | Apps | Goals | Apps | Goals |
|---|---|---|---|---|---|---|---|
| | DF | (Germany) GER | Daniel Antweiler | 6 | 0 | 6 | 0 |
| | DF | (Germany) GER | Michael Bemben | 7 | 0 | 7 | 0 |
| | FW | (Mali) MLI | Bakary Diakité | 3 | 0 | 3 | 0 |
| | FW | (Germany) GER | Tobias Dudeck | 1 | 0 | 1 | 0 |
| | FW | (Cameroon) CMR | Francis-Joseph Etouké | 31 | 1 | 31 | 1 |
| | DF | (Germany) GER | Frank Fahrenhorst | 14 | 0 | 14 | 0 |
| | MF | (Italy) ITA | Giovanni Federico | 31 | 7 | 31 | 7 |
| | MF | (Germany) GER | Paul Freier | 35 | 11 | 35 | 11 |
| | MF | (Germany) GER | Tobias Gerwing-Gerwer | 1 | 0 | 1 | 0 |
| | MF | (Poland) POL | Arek Grad | 27 | 3 | 27 | 3 |
| | MF | (Germany) GER | Benjamin Heydel | 5 | 0 | 5 | 0 |
| | DF | (Germany) GER | Jan Holland | 36 | 3 | 36 | 3 |
| | MF | (Germany) GER | Gerrit Hundshagen | 31 | 2 | 31 | 2 |
| | MF | (Germany) GER | Björn Joppe | 23 | 6 | 23 | 6 |
| | MF | (Germany) GER | Sascha Lindner | 38 | 0 | 38 | 0 |
| | FW | (Cameroon) CMR | César M'Boma | 12 | 1 | 12 | 1 |
| | MF | (Germany) GER | Jan Majewski | 29 | 13 | 29 | 13 |
| | FW | (Croatia) CRO | Marijo Marić (since 4 December 1999) | 1 | 0 | 1 | 0 |
| | DF | (Germany) GER | Wojtek Meinert | 6 | 1 | 6 | 1 |
| | MF | (Germany) GER | Nicolas Michaty | 0 | 0 | 0 | 0 |
| | DF | (Turkey) TUR | Aykan Özer | 14 | 0 | 14 | 0 |
| | FW | (Poland) POL | Jacek Ratajczak | 18 | 0 | 18 | 0 |
| | MF | (Germany) GER | Damian Schindzielorz | 6 | 0 | 6 | 0 |
| | GK | (Germany) GER | Klaus Schlapka | 1 | 0 | 1 | 0 |
| | DF | (Germany) GER | Rouven Schröder | 38 | 0 | 38 | 0 |
| | FW | (Germany) GER | Sascha Siebert | 34 | 12 | 34 | 12 |
| | MF | (Germany) GER | Farat Toku | 5 | 0 | 5 | 0 |
| | GK | (Germany) GER | Stefan Wächter | 37 | 0 | 37 | 0 |
| | DF | (Turkey) TUR | Bekir Burak Yarar | 29 | 0 | 29 | 0 |
