= 2000–01 VfL Bochum season =

VfL Bochum
2000–01 season
- President: Werner Altegoer
- Head Coach: Ralf Zumdick (until 13 February 2001); Rolf Schafstall (ad interim, since 13 February 2001)
- Stadium: Ruhrstadion
- Bundesliga: 18th (relegated)
- DFB-Pokal: Quarter-finals
- Top goalscorer: League: Marić (8); All: Marić (9)
- Highest home attendance: 33,000 (vs Borussia Dortmund, 19 November 2000)
- Lowest home attendance: 12,332 (vs SC Freiburg, 12 May 2001)
- Average home league attendance: 19,597
Home colours	Away colours	Third colours

The 2000–01 VfL Bochum season was the 63rd season in club history.

== Review and events ==
On 13 February 2001 head coach Ralf Zumdick was sacked and replaced by caretaker Rolf Schafstall.

== Matches ==
=== Legend ===
Win Draw Loss

=== Bundesliga ===
12 August 2000 1	1. FC Kaiserslautern	0 – 1	VfL Bochum	Kaiserslautern
15:30			Buckley 62'	Stadium: Fritz-Walter-Stadion; Attendance: 38,355; Referee: Helmut Fleischer (Ulm)

19 August 2000 2	VfL Bochum	0 – 3	FC Bayern Munich	Bochum
15:30			Jancker 16', 23'; Santa Cruz 19'	Stadium: Ruhrstadion; Attendance: 32,645; Referee: Alfons Berg (Konz)

6 September 2000 3	Hertha BSC	4 – 0	VfL Bochum	Berlin
20:15	Preetz 20', 60'; Alves 35'; Hartmann 43'			Stadium: Olympiastadion; Attendance: 30,944; Referee: Hartmut Strampe (Handorf)

9 September 2000 4	VfL Bochum	0 – 4	Hamburger SV	Bochum
15:30			Kovač 24'; Mahdavikia 33'; Barbarez 55', 59'	Stadium: Ruhrstadion; Attendance: 20,500; Referee: Jörg Keßler (Höhenkirchen)

16 September 2000 5	VfL Bochum	2 – 1	VfL Wolfsburg	Bochum
15:30	Marić 18' (pen.); Fahrenhorst 48'		Rische 82'	Stadium: Ruhrstadion; Attendance: 14,107; Referee: Lutz Michael Fröhlich (Berlin)

23 September 2000 6	VfB Stuttgart	1 – 1	VfL Bochum	Stuttgart
15:30	Dundee 90'		Peschel 11'	Stadium: Gottlieb-Daimler-Stadion; Attendance: 18,000; Referee: Wolfgang Stark (Ergolding)

30 September 2000 7	VfL Bochum	3 – 0	SpVgg Unterhaching	Bochum
15:30	Marić 50', 88'; Peschel 69'			Stadium: Ruhrstadion; Attendance: 15,500; Referee: Uwe Kemmling (Kleinburgwedel)

14 October 2000 8	1. FC Köln	2 – 0	VfL Bochum	Cologne
15:30	Timm 82'; Kurth 86'			Stadium: Radrennbahn Müngersdorf; Attendance: 33,500; Referee: Michael Weiner (Giesen)

22 October 2000 9	VfL Bochum	1 – 2	FC Hansa Rostock	Bochum
17:30	Weber 56'		Arvidsson 67'; Kovacec 76'	Stadium: Ruhrstadion; Attendance: 17,871; Referee: Peter Gagelmann (Bremen)

27 October 2000 10	FC Energie Cottbus	2 – 0	VfL Bochum	Cottbus
20:15	Mičevski 29'; Miriuță 43'			Stadium: Stadion der Freundschaft; Attendance: 14,835; Referee: Hermann Albrecht (Kaufbeuren)

4 November 2000 11	VfL Bochum	1 – 1	TSV 1860 Munich	Bochum
15:30	Drinčić 62'		Agostino 53'	Stadium: Ruhrstadion; Attendance: 15,591; Referee: Markus Merk (Otterbach)

11 November 2000 12	SV Werder Bremen	2 – 0	VfL Bochum	Bremen
20:15	Aílton 46'; Pizarro 81'			Stadium: Weserstadion; Attendance: 27,525; Referee: Helmut Fleischer (Ulm)

19 November 2000 13	VfL Bochum	1 – 1	Borussia Dortmund	Bochum
17:30	Drinčić 75'		Heinrich 87'	Stadium: Ruhrstadion; Attendance: 33,000; Referee: Jürgen Aust (Cologne)

24 November 2000 14	FC Schalke 04	2 – 1	VfL Bochum	Gelsenkirchen
20:15	Mulder 37'; Sand 63'		Marić 48'	Stadium: Parkstadion; Attendance: 41,719; Referee: Uwe Kemmling (Kleinburgwedel)

2 December 2000 15	VfL Bochum	2 – 1	Eintracht Frankfurt	Bochum
15:30	Drinčić 15'; Fahrenhorst 34'		Reichenberger 49'	Stadium: Ruhrstadion; Attendance: 17,300; Referee: Bernd Heynemann (Magdeburg)

9 December 2000 16	SC Freiburg	5 – 0	VfL Bochum	Freiburg
15:30	Diarra 21'; Sellimi 48'; Iashvili 51'; Baya 66'; Sundermann 76' (o.g.)			Stadium: Dreisamstadion; Attendance: 24,500; Referee: Jörg Keßler (Höhenkirchen)

13 December 2000 17	VfL Bochum	3 – 2	Bayer 04 Leverkusen	Bochum
18:15	Marić 40', 52' (pen.), 74' (pen.)		Kirsten 67'; Neuville 76'	Stadium: Ruhrstadion; Attendance: 15,755; Referee: Florian Meyer (Burgdorf)

16 December 2000 18	VfL Bochum	0 – 1	1. FC Kaiserslautern	Bochum
15:30			Klose 37'	Stadium: Ruhrstadion; Attendance: 15,800; Referee: Franz-Xaver Wack (Biberbach)

27 January 2001 19	FC Bayern Munich	3 – 2	VfL Bochum	Munich
15:30	Effenberg 21', 89'; Élber 53'		Baştürk 41', 59'	Stadium: Olympiastadion; Attendance: 32,000; Referee: Edgar Steinborn (Sinzig)

3 February 2001 20	VfL Bochum	1 – 3	Hertha BSC	Bochum
15:30	Peschel 62'		Preetz 32'; Michalke 67', 90'	Stadium: Ruhrstadion; Attendance: 15,302; Referee: Peter Sippel (Munich)

10 February 2001 21	Hamburger SV	3 – 0	VfL Bochum	Hamburg
15:30	Yeboah 16'; Butt 34' (pen.); Barbarez 38'			Stadium: Volksparkstadion; Attendance: 31,827; Referee: Hartmut Strampe (Handorf)

17 February 2001 22	VfL Wolfsburg	0 – 0	VfL Bochum	Wolfsburg
15:30				Stadium: VfL-Stadion am Elsterweg; Attendance: 12,318; Referee: Alfons Berg (Konz)

25 February 2001 23	VfL Bochum	0 – 0	VfB Stuttgart	Bochum
17:30				Stadium: Ruhrstadion; Attendance: 18,800; Referee: Herbert Fandel (Kyllburg)

3 March 2001 24	SpVgg Unterhaching	2 – 1	VfL Bochum	Unterhaching
15:30	Straube 37'; Breitenreiter 85'		Christiansen 27'	Stadium: Generali Sportpark; Attendance: 9,000; Referee: Florian Meyer (Burgdorf)

10 March 2001 25	VfL Bochum	2 – 3	1. FC Köln	Bochum
15:30	Buckley 24'; Schindzielorz 31'		Arveladze 38'; Kreuz 61'; Pivaljević 80'	Stadium: Ruhrstadion; Attendance: 21,683; Referee: Lutz Michael Fröhlich (Berlin)

17 March 2001 26	FC Hansa Rostock	2 – 0	VfL Bochum	Rostock
15:30	Agali 71', 80'			Stadium: Ostseestadion; Attendance: 15,000; Referee: Jörg Keßler (Höhenkirchen)

1 April 2001 27	VfL Bochum	1 – 0	FC Energie Cottbus	Bochum
17:30	Reis 75'			Stadium: Ruhrstadion; Attendance: 12,351; Referee: Franz-Xaver Wack (Biberbach)

7 April 2001 28	TSV 1860 Munich	2 – 4	VfL Bochum	Munich
15:30	Schröder 56' (o.g.); Borimirov 86'		Baştürk 37', 49'; Reis 59'; Schindzielorz 88'	Stadium: Olympiastadion; Attendance: 263,00; Referee: Bernd Heynemann (Magdeburg)

14 April 2001 29	VfL Bochum	1 – 2	SV Werder Bremen	Bochum
15:30	Reis 62'		Pizarro 38'; Verlaat 74'	Stadium: Ruhrstadion; Attendance: 21,974; Referee: Uwe Kemmling (Kleinburgwedel)

20 April 2001 30	Borussia Dortmund	5 – 0	VfL Bochum	Dortmund
20:15	Ricken 18'; Heinrich 29'; Reina 66', 68'; Stević 89' (pen.)			Stadium: Westfalenstadion; Attendance: 65,500; Referee: Helmut Fleischer (Ulm)

28 April 2001 31	VfL Bochum	1 – 1	FC Schalke 04	Bochum
20:15	Freier 22'		Mpenza 70'	Stadium: Ruhrstadion; Attendance: 32,645; Referee: Alfons Berg (Konz)

5 May 2001 32	Eintracht Frankfurt	3 – 0	VfL Bochum	Frankfurt am Main
15:30	Branco 53'; Yang 82'; Preuß 84'			Stadium: Waldstadion; Attendance: 20,600; Referee: Markus Merk (Otterbach)

12 May 2001 33	VfL Bochum	1 – 3	SC Freiburg	Bochum
15:30	Marić 54' (pen.)		Tanko 33'; Sellimi 47', 90'	Stadium: Ruhrstadion; Attendance: 12,332; Referee: Peter Sippel (Munich)

19 May 2001 34	Bayer 04 Leverkusen	1 – 0	VfL Bochum	Leverkusen
15:30	Neuville 21'			Stadium: BayArena; Attendance: 22,500; Referee: Michael Weiner (Giesen)

=== DFB-Pokal ===
26 August 2000 R1	SV Babelsberg 03	1 – 6	VfL Bochum	Babelsberg
15:30	Küntzel 47'		Peschel 13'; Buckley 26'; Baştürk 41'; Weber 63', 85', 87'	Stadium: Karl-Liebknecht-Stadion; Attendance: 3,153; Referee: Florian Meyer (Burgdorf)

31 October 2000 R2	Arminia Bielefeld	0 – 4	VfL Bochum	Bielefeld
19:30			Marić 4'; Schindzielorz 59'; Baştürk 61'; Peschel 77'	Stadium: Alm; Attendance: 8,900; Referee: Lutz Wagner (Kriftel)

29 November 2000 R3	TSV 1860 Munich	0 – 5	VfL Bochum	Olympiastadion
19:30			Buckley 32'; Baştürk 69'; Rietpietsch 75', 89'; Drinčić 81'	Attendance: 10,000; Referee: Michael Weiner (Giesen)

20 December 2000 QF	1. FC Union Berlin	1 – 0	VfL Bochum	Berlin
19:00	Ernemann 90'			Stadium: Stadion An der Alten Försterei; Attendance: 11,045; Referee: Markus Merk (Otterbach)

== Squad ==
=== Squad and statistics ===
==== Squad, appearances and goals scored ====
No.	Pos	Nat	Player	Total		Bundesliga		DFB-Pokal	
No.	Pos	Nat	Player	Apps	Goals	Apps	Goals	Apps	Goals
1	GK	(Netherlands) NED	Rein van Duijnhoven	37	0	33	0	4	0
2	DF	(Croatia) CRO	Samir Toplak	10	0	10	0	0	0
3	DF	(Germany) GER	Martin Meichelbeck	23	0	19	0	4	0
4	DF	(Germany) GER	Axel Sundermann	15	0	12	0	3	0
5	DF	(Croatia) CRO	Damir Milinović	22	0	20	0	2	0
6	MF	(Germany) GER	Matthias Lust	3	0	3	0	0	0
7	MF	(Germany) GER	Peter Peschel	22	5	20	3	2	2
8	MF	(Germany) GER	Sebastian Schindzielorz	33	3	30	2	3	1
9	FW	(Germany) GER	Achim Weber (until 31 December 2000)	10	4	9	1	1	3
9	FW	(Spain) ESP	Thomas Christiansen (since 1 January 2001)	12	1	12	1	0	0
10	MF	(Turkey) TUR	Yıldıray Baştürk	32	7	29	4	3	3
11	FW	(South Africa) RSA	Delron Buckley	22	4	19	2	3	2
12	DF	(Germany) GER	Thomas Stickroth	12	0	10	0	2	0
13	MF	(Russia) RUS	Sergei Mandreko	26	0	23	0	3	0
14	MF	(Croatia) CRO	Ante Čović	5	0	5	0	0	0
15	MF	(Germany) GER	Olaf Schreiber	7	0	7	0	0	0
16	DF	(Germany) GER	Hilko Ristau	16	0	13	0	3	0
17	FW	(Poland) POL	Henryk Bałuszyński	12	0	11	0	1	0
18	FW	(Croatia) CRO	Marijo Marić	29	9	27	8	2	1
19	FW	(Federal Republic of Yugoslavia) YUG	Zdravko Drinčić	19	4	16	3	3	1
20	MF	(Croatia) CRO	Zoran Mamić	24	0	21	0	3	0
21	GK	(Germany) GER	Thomas Ernst (until 31 December 2000)	1	0	1	0	0	0
21	FW	(Germany) GER	Sascha Siebert (since 10 March 2001)	1	0	1	0	0	0
22	DF	(Germany) GER	Thomas Reis	12	3	12	3	0	0
23	DF	(Germany) GER	Mirko Dickhaut	22	0	20	0	2	0
24	DF	(Germany) GER	Michael Bemben	20	0	17	0	3	0
25	DF	(Germany) GER	Frank Fahrenhorst	20	2	18	2	2	0
26	MF	(Germany) GER	Mike Rietpietsch	7	2	5	0	2	2
27	FW	(Germany) GER	René Müller (until 31 December 2000)	1	0	1	0	0	0
28	GK	(Germany) GER	Christian Vander	2	0	2	0	0	0
30	MF	(Germany) GER	Paul Freier	25	1	22	1	3	0
33	DF	(Germany) GER	Rouven Schröder (since 1 April 2001)	8	0	8	0	0	0
34	DF	(Denmark) DEN	Søren Colding (since 1 January 2001)	16	0	16	0	0	0

=== Transfers ===
==== Summer ====
In:

No.	Pos.	Nation	Player
3	DF	GER	Martin Meichelbeck (from SpVgg Greuther Fürth)
5	DF	CRO	Damir Milinović (from HNK Rijeka)
13	MF	RUS	Sergei Mandreko (from Hertha BSC)
14	MF	CRO	Ante Čović (from Hertha BSC)
20	MF	CRO	Zoran Mamić (from Bayer 04 Leverkusen)
28	GK	GER	Christian Vander (from KFC Uerdingen 05)

Out:

No.	Pos.	Nation	Player
3	DF	GER	Sven Boy (to SpVgg Greuther Fürth)
25	MF	GER	Jan Majewski (to SC Verl)
26	FW	POL	Jacek Ratajczak (to SV Babelsberg 03)

==== Winter ====
In:

No.	Pos.	Nation	Player
9	FW	ESP	Thomas Christiansen (from Herfølge Boldklub)
21	FW	GER	Sascha Siebert (from VfL Bochum II)
33	DF	GER	Rouven Schröder (from VfL Bochum II)
34	DF	DEN	Søren Colding (from Brøndby IF)

Out:

No.	Pos.	Nation	Player
9	FW	GER	Achim Weber (to Rot-Weiß Oberhausen)
21	GK	GER	Thomas Ernst (to VfB Stuttgart)
27	FW	GER	René Müller (to Rot-Weiß Oberhausen)

== VfL Bochum II ==
No.	Pos	Nat	Player	Total		Oberliga Westfalen	
No.	Pos	Nat	Player	Apps	Goals	Apps	Goals
	MF	(Germany) GER	Markus Ehrhard	27	7	27	7
	DF	(Germany) GER	Frank Fahrenhorst	15	3	15	3
	MF	(Germany) GER	Paul Freier	3	1	3	1
	MF	(Poland) POL	Arek Grad	27	11	27	11
	DF	(Germany) GER	Marcel Hausherr	4	0	4	0
	MF	(Germany) GER	Benjamin Heydel	19	2	19	2
	MF	(Germany) GER	Björn Joppe	34	6	34	6
	FW	(Germany) GER	Seyfullah Kalayci	21	5	21	5
	DF	(Germany) GER	Christoph Keim	19	0	19	0
	MF	(Germany) GER	Steve Kozole	19	0	19	0
	DF	(Germany) GER	Tamer Kurmali	1	0	1	0
	MF	(Germany) GER	Sascha Lindner	31	2	31	2
	MF	(Germany) GER	Wojtek Meinert	6	0	6	0
	MF	(Germany) GER	Nicolas Michaty	1	0	1	0
	MF	(Spain) ESP	Angel Parla-Diaz	31	13	31	13
	MF	(Germany) GER	Damian Schindzielorz	2	0	2	0
	GK	(Germany) GER	Klaus Schlapka	32	0	32	0
	DF	(Germany) GER	Rouven Schröder	23	1	23	1
	GK	(Germany) GER	Marco Schulz	5	0	5	0
	MF	(Germany) GER	Rainer Schümann	32	2	32	2
	DF	(Germany) GER	Tobias Seiler	19	0	19	0
	FW	(Germany) GER	Sascha Siebert	35	22	35	22
	MF	(Germany) GER	Roy Stamer	13	1	13	1
	MF	(Turkey) TUR	Farat Toku	17	4	17	4
	MF	(Italy) ITA	Luciano Velardi	23	6	23	6
