= Paul Freier =

German footballer

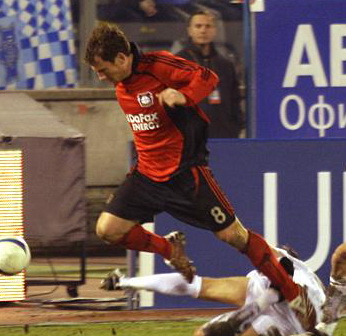
- Freier playing for Leverkusen in 2008

Personal information
- Full name: Slawomir Paul Freier
- Date of birth: 26 July 1979 (age 47)
- Place of birth: Bytom, Poland
- Height: 1.80 m (5 ft 11 in)
- Positions: Right midfielder; right winger; right-back

Team information
- Current team: Rot-Weiss Essen (assistant)

Youth career
- 1984–1990: ŁTS Łabędy
- 1990–1993: SV Holzen
- 1993–1996: BSV Menden
- 1996–1998: VfL Bochum

Senior career*
Years	Team	Apps	(Gls)
1998–2001	VfL Bochum II	68	(19)
1999–2004	VfL Bochum	117	(16)
2004–2008	Bayer 04 Leverkusen	112	(17)
2008–2014	VfL Bochum	149	(18)
2009–2011	→ VfL Bochum II	5	(0)
Total		451	(60)

International career
2000–2001	Germany U21	13	(2)
2002–2007	Germany	19	(1)

Managerial career
- 2015: VfL Bochum U16 (assistant)
- 2015–2016: VfL Bochum U19 (assistant)
- 2016–2017: FC Iserlohn U19 (assistant)
- 2017–2018: Schalke 04 U19 (assistant)
- 2018–2019: VfL Bochum U16
- 2019–2021: FC Iserlohn U17 (assistant)
- 2021–2022: SV Lippstadt U17
- 2022–2023: Fortuna Düsseldorf II (assistant)
- 2023–: Rot-Weiss Essen (assistant)
- * Club domestic league appearances and goals

Slawomir Paul Freier (Polish: Sławomir Paweł Freier; born 26 July 1979), also known as Slawo Freier, is a German football coach and former player. He usually played as a right midfielder but also as a winger and full-back. He is currently the assistant manager of Rot-Weiss Essen.

== Early life ==
Freier was born in 1979 in the Upper Silesian city of Bytom (German: Beuthen). At the age of 5, he joined the club ŁTS Łabędy in Gliwice, Poland. At age 11, Freier emigrated with his parents from Upper Silesia to Germany, where the family settled in Arnsberg-Holzen in North Rhine-Westphalia. Newly arrived there, he joined SV Holzen and three years later moved to BSV Menden. In his youth, Freier received an offer from Borussia Dortmund, but his father refused a move to Dortmund. In 1996, Freier joined the youth team of VfL Bochum.

== Club career ==
=== First spell at Bochum ===
In 1998, Freier was part of Bochum's second team, and on 5 November 1999, he made his professional debut for the first team in a 2–0 win against SV Waldhof Mannheim on matchday eleven of the 1999–2000 2. Bundesliga campaign. In the 89th minute, he replaced Delron Buckley. With Bochum, Freier celebrated promotion to the Bundesliga. On 12 August 2000, he made his debut in the Bundesliga in a 1–0 win on first matchday against 1. FC Kaiserslautern. On 28 April 2001, 31st match day, Freier scored his first goal in the Bundesliga in the 1–1 draw in the derby against FC Schalke 04. At the end of the season, he had made 22 appearances and scored one goal and VfL Bochum was relegated from the Bundesliga. In the 2001–02 season, Freier made 30 appearances scoring seven goals and was promoted again with the VfL Bochum to the Bundesliga. In the next season, Bochum reached the ninth place with Freier making 32 appearances and scoring seven goals. In the 2003–04 season, he played in 27 games and scored one goal. This season, VfL Bochum placed in the final standings in front of their local rivals from Gelsenkirchen, FC Schalke and Borussia Dortmund (Schalke being a district of Gelsenkirchen).

=== Spell at Bayer Leverkusen ===
In four seasons at Bayer Leverkusen between 2004 and 2008, Freier amassed 17 goals in 112 league matches.

=== Return to VfL Bochum and retirement ===
Freier returned to VfL Bochum at the end of the 2007–08 season, signing a five-year contract. He retired at the end of the 2013–14 season.

== Post-retirement ==
Six months after retiring as a player, Freier was hired as assistant coach for the U16 team of VfL Bochum.

On 8 June 2015, it was confirmed that Freier was the new assistant manager of the U19 team of Bochum.

== International career ==
Freier was a member of the German national team, earning 19 caps. He was initially named in Germany's UEFA Euro 2004 squad but had to withdraw through injury. He was called up as a backup squad member for the 2006 World Cup. His only goal for Germany came in a 4–1 win over Canada in June 2003.

== Career statistics ==
=== Club ===
As of 16 May 2014

Club performance			League		Cup		League Cup		Continental		Other		Total	
Season	Club	League	Apps	Goals	Apps	Goals	Apps	Goals	Apps	Goals	Apps	Goals	Apps	Goals
Germany			League		DFB-Pokal		DFB-Ligapokal		Europe		Other^{1}		Total	
1997–98	VfL Bochum II	Oberliga Westfalen	4	1	—		—		—		—		4	1
1998–99	VfL Bochum II	Oberliga Westfalen	26	6	—		—		—		—		26	6
1999–00	VfL Bochum II	Regionalliga West/Südwest	35	11	—		—		—		—		35	11
2000–01	VfL Bochum II	Oberliga Westfalen	3	1	—		—		—		—		3	1
1999–00	VfL Bochum	2. Bundesliga	6	0	0	0	—		—		—		6	0
2000–01	VfL Bochum	Bundesliga	22	1	3	0	—		—		—		25	1
2001–02	VfL Bochum	2. Bundesliga	30	7	1	1	—		—		—		31	8
2002–03	VfL Bochum	Bundesliga	32	7	4	3	—		—		—		36	10
2003–04	VfL Bochum	Bundesliga	27	1	1	0	1	0	—		—		29	1
2004–05	Bayer Leverkusen	Bundesliga	33	6	2	0	2	1	9	0	—		46	7
2005–06	Bayer Leverkusen	Bundesliga	29	6	2	0	0	0	1	0	—		32	6
2006–07	Bayer Leverkusen	Bundesliga	31	3	2	1	1	0	11	0	—		45	4
2007–08	Bayer Leverkusen	Bundesliga	19	2	0	0	—		6	1	—		25	3
2008–09	VfL Bochum	Bundesliga	28	1	1	0	—		—		—		29	1
2009–10	VfL Bochum	Bundesliga	28	2	2	0	—		—		—		30	2
2010–11	VfL Bochum	2. Bundesliga	18	2	1	0	—		—		2	0	21	2
2011–12	VfL Bochum	2. Bundesliga	27	2	2	1	—		—		—		29	3
2012–13	VfL Bochum	2. Bundesliga	21	1	2	0	—		—		—		23	1
2013–14	VfL Bochum	2. Bundesliga	27	0	2	0	—		—		—		29	0
2008–09	VfL Bochum II	Regionalliga West	2	0	—		—		—		—		2	0
2009–10	VfL Bochum II	Regionalliga West	2	0	—		—		—		—		2	0
2010–11	VfL Bochum II	Regionalliga West	1	0	—		—		—		—		1	0
Total	Germany		451	60	25	6	4	1	27	1	2	0	509	68
Career total			451	60	25	6	4	1	27	1	2	0	509	68

^{1} 2010–11 includes the 2. Bundesliga/Bundesliga promotion/relegation playoffs.

=== International ===
Appearances and goals by national team and year
National team	Year	Apps	Goals
Germany	2002	5	0
Germany	2003	8	1
Germany	2004	4	0
Germany	2005	1	0
Germany	2006	–	
Germany	2007	1	0
Total		19	1

Scores and results list Germany's goal tally first, score column indicates score after each Freier goal.

List of international goals scored by Paul Freier
No.	Date	Venue	Opponent	Score	Result	Competition
1	1 June 2003	Volkswagen Arena, Wolfsburg, Germany	Canada	2–1	4–1	Friendly
