= Olaf Schreiber =

German footballer (born 1969)

Personal information
- Date of birth: 12 September 1969 (age 57)
- Place of birth: Zwickau, East Germany
- Height: 1.80 m (5 ft 11 in)
- Position: Midfielder

Youth career
- 1977–1988: BSG Sachsenring Zwickau

Senior career*
| Years | Team | Apps | (Gls) |
| 1987–1991 | BSG Sachsenring Zwickau | 78 | (32) |
| 1991–1994 | Carl Zeiss Jena | 103 | (17) |
| 1994–1996 | FSV Zwickau | 54 | (3) |
| 1996–2001 | VfL Bochum | 78 | (2) |
| Total | | 313 | (54) |

International career
| 1988–1989 | East Germany U18 | 6 | (0) |
- * Club domestic league appearances and goals

Olaf Schreiber (born 12 September 1969) is a German former professional footballer who played as a midfielder for Carl Zeiss Jena, FSV Zwickau and VfL Bochum.

== Career ==
Schreiber was a part of the East German squad at the 1989 FIFA World Youth Championship, playing all three matches.

== Career statistics ==
Appearances and goals by club, season and competition
| Club | Season | League | | | National cup (Note: Includes FDGB-Pokal, DFB-Pokal) | | DFB-Ligapokal | | Continental | | Total | |
| Club | Season | Division | Apps | Goals | Apps | Goals | Apps | Goals | Apps | Goals | Apps | Goals |
|---|---|---|---|---|---|---|---|---|---|---|---|---|
| BSG Sachsenring Zwickau | 1987–88 | DDR-Liga | 2 | 0 | 0 | 0 | — | | — | | 2 | 0 |
| BSG Sachsenring Zwickau | 1988–89 | DDR-Oberliga | 22 | 2 | 2 | 0 | — | | — | | 24 | 2 |
| BSG Sachsenring Zwickau | 1989–90 | DDR-Liga | 28 | 12 | 0 | 0 | — | | — | | 28 | 12 |
| BSG Sachsenring Zwickau | 1990–91 | DDR-Liga | 26 | 18 | 2 | 2 | — | | — | | 28 | 20 |
| BSG Sachsenring Zwickau | Total | | 78 | 32 | 4 | 2 | 0 | 0 | 0 | 0 | 82 | 34 |
| Carl Zeiss Jena | 1991–92 | 2. Bundesliga | 31 | 8 | 1 | 0 | — | | — | | 32 | 8 |
| Carl Zeiss Jena | 1992–93 | 2. Bundesliga | 40 | 9 | 2 | 1 | — | | — | | 42 | 10 |
| Carl Zeiss Jena | 1993–94 | 2. Bundesliga | 32 | 0 | 4 | 3 | — | | — | | 36 | 3 |
| Carl Zeiss Jena | Total | | 103 | 17 | 7 | 4 | 0 | 0 | 0 | 0 | 110 | 21 |
| FSV Zwickau | 1994–95 | 2. Bundesliga | 30 | 2 | — | | — | | — | | 30 | 2 |
| FSV Zwickau | 1995–96 | 2. Bundesliga | 24 | 1 | 2 | 0 | — | | — | | 26 | 1 |
| FSV Zwickau | Total | | 54 | 3 | 2 | 0 | 0 | 0 | 0 | 0 | 56 | 3 |
| VfL Bochum | 1996–97 | Bundesliga | 24 | 1 | 3 | 0 | — | | — | | 27 | 1 |
| VfL Bochum | 1997–98 | Bundesliga | 27 | 1 | 2 | 0 | 1 | 0 | 5 | 0 | 35 | 1 |
| VfL Bochum | 1998–99 | Bundesliga | 10 | 0 | 1 | 0 | — | | — | | 11 | 0 |
| VfL Bochum | 1999–00 | 2. Bundesliga | 10 | 0 | 1 | 0 | — | | — | | 11 | 0 |
| VfL Bochum | 2000–01 | Bundesliga | 7 | 0 | 0 | 0 | — | | — | | 7 | 0 |
| VfL Bochum | Total | | 78 | 2 | 7 | 0 | 1 | 0 | 5 | 0 | 91 | 2 |
| Career total | | | 313 | 54 | 20 | 6 | 1 | 0 | 5 | 0 | 339 | 60 |
