= Rein van Duijnhoven =

Dutch footballer

Personal information
- Date of birth: 5 September 1967 (age 59)
- Place of birth: Veghel, Netherlands
- Height: 1.93 m (6 ft 4 in)
- Position: Goalkeeper

Youth career
- vv Nuenen

Senior career*
| Years | Team | Apps | (Gls) |
| 1987–1988 | Helmond Sport | 34 | (0) |
| 1988–1990 | LONGA | | |
| 1990–1994 | Helmond Sport | 143 | (0) |
| 1994–1999 | MVV | 159 | (1) |
| 1999–2006 | VfL Bochum | 180 | (0) |
- * Club domestic league appearances and goals

Rein van Duijnhoven (Dutch pronunciation: [ˈrɛiɱ vɑn ˈdœynˌɦoːvə(n)]; born 5 September 1967) is a Dutch former professional footballer who played goalkeeper.

== Career ==
Van Duijnhoven was born in Veghel, Netherlands. During the 1995–96 season, he scored for MVV Maastricht in a game against FC Den Bosch. This goal was voted the season's Goal of the Season.

Van Duijnhoven played for Helmond Sport, Longa Tilburg, MVV Maastricht and VfL Bochum. In March 2004, he claimed a place in Bundesliga history after keeping a record 912 minutes of clean sheets beating the previous record held by Norbert Nigbur.

== Retirement ==
As of 2017, van Duijnhoven is goalkeeper coach at Helmond Sport.

== Career statistics ==
Appearances and goals by club, season and competition
| Club | Season | League | | | National cup | | League cup | | Continental | | Total | |
| Club | Season | Division | Apps | Goals | Apps | Goals | Apps | Goals | Apps | Goals | Apps | Goals |
|---|---|---|---|---|---|---|---|---|---|---|---|---|
| Helmond Sport | 1987–88 | Eerste Divisie | 34 | 0 | | | — | | — | | | |
| Longa Tilburg | 1988–89 | Zondaghoofdklasse C | 31 | 0 | | | — | | — | | | |
| Longa Tilburg | 1989–90 | Zondaghoofdklasse C | | | — | | — | | — | | | |
| Helmond Sport | 1990–91 | Eerste Divisie | 38 | 0 | | | — | | — | | | |
| Helmond Sport | 1991–92 | Eerste Divisie | 38 | 0 | | | — | | — | | | |
| Helmond Sport | 1992–93 | Eerste Divisie | 34 | 0 | | | — | | — | | | |
| Helmond Sport | 1993–94 | Eerste Divisie | 33 | 0 | | | — | | — | | | |
| Helmond Sport | Total | | 143 | 0 | | | 0 | 0 | 0 | 0 | | |
| MVV Maastricht | 1994–95 | Eredivisie | 33 | 0 | | | — | | — | | | |
| MVV Maastricht | 1995–96 | Eerste Divisie | 32 | 0 | | | — | | — | | | |
| MVV Maastricht | 1996–97 | Eerste Divisie | 32 | 1 | | | — | | — | | | |
| MVV Maastricht | 1997–98 | Eredivisie | 29 | 0 | | | — | | — | | | |
| MVV Maastricht | 1998–99 | Eredivisie | 33 | 0 | | | — | | — | | | |
| MVV Maastricht | Total | | 159 | 1 | | | 0 | 0 | 0 | 0 | | |
| VfL Bochum | 1999–00 | 2. Bundesliga | 16 | 0 | 1 | 0 | — | | — | | 17 | 0 |
| VfL Bochum | 2000–01 | Bundesliga | 33 | 0 | 4 | 0 | — | | — | | 37 | 0 |
| VfL Bochum | 2001–02 | 2. Bundesliga | 29 | 0 | 1 | 0 | — | | — | | 30 | 0 |
| VfL Bochum | 2002–03 | Bundesliga | 28 | 0 | 2 | 0 | — | | — | | 30 | 0 |
| VfL Bochum | 2003–04 | Bundesliga | 34 | 0 | 0 | 0 | 1 | 0 | — | | 35 | 0 |
| VfL Bochum | 2004–05 | Bundesliga | 24 | 0 | 1 | 0 | 1 | 0 | 2 | 0 | 28 | 0 |
| VfL Bochum | 2005–06 | 2. Bundesliga | 16 | 0 | 2 | 0 | — | | — | | 18 | 0 |
| VfL Bochum | Total | | 180 | 0 | 11 | 0 | 2 | 0 | 2 | 0 | 195 | 0 |
| Career total | | | | | | | 2 | 0 | 2 | 0 | | |

== See also ==
- List of goalscoring goalkeepers
