= Michael Bemben =

German footballer (born 1976)

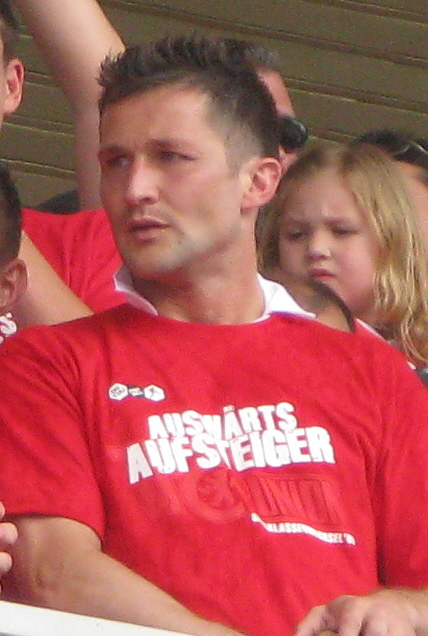
- Bemben in 2009

Personal information
- Date of birth: 28 January 1976 (age 50)
- Place of birth: Ruda Śląska, Poland
- Height: 1.82 m (6 ft 0 in)
- Position: Right-back

Youth career
- 1985–1989: Górnik Zabrze
- 1989–1991: SpVgg Bönen
- 1991–1994: Hammer SpVg

Senior career*
Years	Team	Apps	(Gls)
1994–1995	Hammer SpVg		
1995–1998	VfL Bochum II		
1998–2005	VfL Bochum	122	(3)
2005–2007	Rot-Weiss Essen	58	(7)
2007–2010	Union Berlin	90	(1)
2010–2013	Górnik Zabrze	68	(2)
2013–2014	Wuppertaler SV	9	(0)
- * Club domestic league appearances and goals

Michael Bemben (born 28 January 1976) is a German former professional footballer who played as a right-back.

== Career ==
In summer 2010, Bemben joined Górnik Zabrze on a one-year deal.

== Personal life ==
In January 2015, Bemben joined lower-league club FC Frohlinde. Born in Poland, he has German citizenship.

== Career statistics ==
Appearances and goals by club, season and competition
Club	Season	League			National cup		League cup		Total	
Club	Season	Division	Apps	Goals	Apps	Goals	Apps	Goals	Apps	Goals
Hammer SpVg	1994–95	Oberliga Westfalen			—		—			
VfL Bochum II	1995–96	Westfalenliga			—		—			
VfL Bochum II	1996–97	Westfalenliga			—		—			
VfL Bochum II	1997–98	Oberliga Westfalen			—		—			
VfL Bochum II	1998–99	Oberliga Westfalen	24	2	—		—		24	2
VfL Bochum II	1999–00	Regionalliga West/Südwest	7	0	—		—		7	0
VfL Bochum II	Total				0	0	0	0		
VfL Bochum	1998–99	Bundesliga	8	0	1	0	—		9	0
VfL Bochum	1999–00	2. Bundesliga	28	1	3	0	—		31	1
VfL Bochum	2000–01	Bundesliga	17	0	3	0	—		20	0
VfL Bochum	2001–02	2. Bundesliga	29	2	2	0	—		31	2
VfL Bochum	2002–03	Bundesliga	24	0	3	0	—		27	0
VfL Bochum	2003–04	Bundesliga	10	0	1	0	—		11	0
VfL Bochum	2004–05	Bundesliga	6	0	1	0	1	0	8	0
VfL Bochum	Total		122	3	14	0	1	0	137	3
Rot-Weiss Essen	2005–06	Regionalliga Nord	34	6	1	1	—		35	7
Rot-Weiss Essen	2006–07	2. Bundesliga	24	1	2	0	—		26	1
Rot-Weiss Essen	Total		58	7	3	1	0	0	61	8
Union Berlin	2007–08	Regionalliga Nord	33	1	1	0	—		34	1
Union Berlin	2008–09	3. Liga	36	0	0	0	—		36	0
Union Berlin	2009–10	2. Bundesliga	21	0	1	0	—		22	0
Union Berlin	Total		90	1	2	0	0	0	92	1
Górnik Zabrze	2010–11	Ekstraklasa	24	2	1	0	—		25	2
Górnik Zabrze	2011–12	Ekstraklasa	26	0	1	0	—		27	0
Górnik Zabrze	2012–13	Ekstraklasa	18	0	1	0	—		19	0
Górnik Zabrze	Total		68	2	3	0	0	0	71	2
Wuppertaler SV	2013–14	Oberliga Niederrhein	9	0	0	0	—		9	0
Career total					22	1	1	0		
