= Frank Fahrenhorst =

German footballer (born 1977)

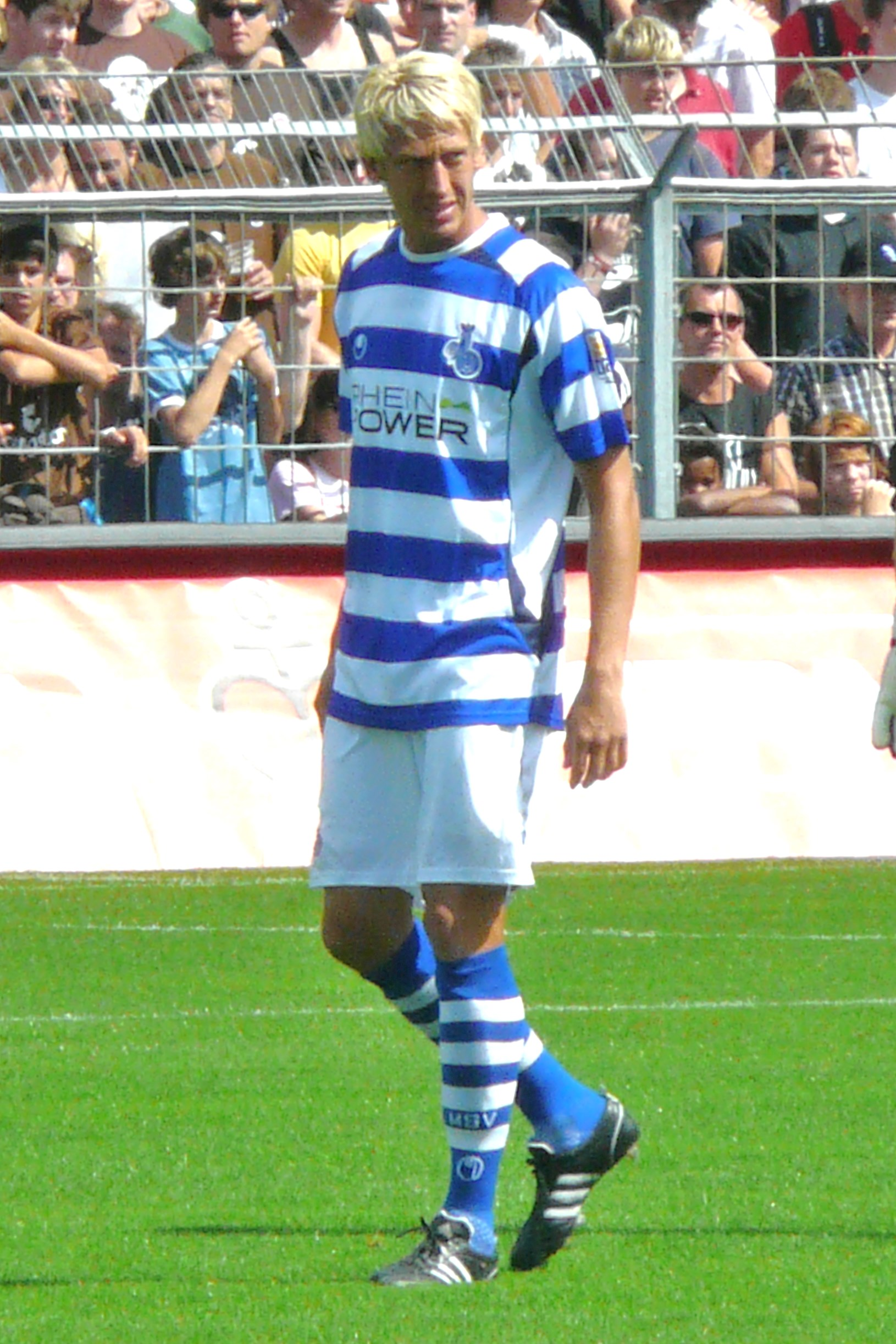
- Fahrenhorst with MSV Duisburg in the 2009–10 season

Personal information
- Date of birth: 24 September 1977 (age 49)
- Place of birth: Kamen, West Germany
- Height: 1.90 m (6 ft 3 in)
- Position: Centre-back

Team information
- Current team: VfB Stuttgart II (Manager)

Youth career
- VfK Nordbögge
- SpVgg Bönen
- –1994: Hammer SpVg
- 1994–1996: VfL Bochum

Senior career*
Years	Team	Apps	(Gls)
1996–2001	VfL Bochum II	61	(7)
1997–2004	VfL Bochum	136	(16)
2004–2006	Werder Bremen	39	(1)
2006–2009	Hannover 96	71	(5)
2009–2010	MSV Duisburg	21	(3)
2010–2012	Schalke 04 II	60	(4)
Total		388	(36)

International career
1998	Germany U-21	2	(0)
1998	Germany Olympic	4	(0)
2002–2004	Germany Team 2006	3	(0)
2004	Germany	2	(0)

Managerial career
- 2012–2013: Schalke 04 II (assistant)
- 2013: Schalke 04 U-17
- 2013–2015: Schalke 04 (youth)
- 2015–2020: Schalke 04 U-17
- 2020–: VfB Stuttgart II
- * Club domestic league appearances and goals

Frank Fahrenhorst (born 24 September 1977) is a German former professional footballer, who played as a defender and is currently manager of VfB Stuttgart II.

== Club career ==
Born in Kamen, North Rhine-Westphalia, Fahrenhorst turned professional with VfL Bochum in 1996 and remained with them for eight seasons as they yo-yo'ed between the top two divisions.

In the summer of 2004, the defender switched to then-champions Werder Bremen, where he won the DFB-Ligapokal against Bayern Munich. The club never managed any further honours during his two seasons there but he did achieve eight appearances in the UEFA Champions League.

On 9 August 2006, he transferred to Hannover 96, as part of the deal which saw Per Mertesacker move in the opposite direction.

On 27 September 2008, Hannover 96 were scheduled to play Bayern Munich at the AWD-Arena. Fahrenhorst was allowed exclusion from the team as his wife was close to giving birth. However, shortly before the match began, Jiří Štajner accidentally injured Mario Eggimann's eye in training. Due to Eggiman's injury, Fahrenhorst was hastily recalled into the starting line-up against the defending champions. He gave an eye-catching, determined performance as Hannover 96 ran out 1–0 winners. On 22 April 2009, Hannover 96 announced that they would not renew his contract.

Fahrenhorst left the club on 30 June 2009 at the end of his contract and joined MSV Duisburg until 30 June 2011. On 17 August 2010 he signed a two-year contract with FC Schalke 04 II.

== International career ==
On 12 August 2004, Fahrenhorst was first invited to the senior national team of Germany, when he was nominated for the test match at the Ernst Happel Stadium in Vienna against Austria. Six days later, Fahrenhorst debuted in this game for the senior team and played the full 90 minutes. On 8 September 2004, Fahrenhorst made his second and final appearances for the senior national team when he played another 90 minutes in the 1-1 draw against Brazil in Berlin's Olympic Stadium. Both matches were international friendlies in the run-up to 2006 FIFA World Cup on home soil.

== Coaching career ==
From 2012 to 2020 Fahrenhorst worked for FC Schalke 04 as youth coach. In the summer of 2020 he became the new head coach of VfB Stuttgart II.

== Personal life ==
His son, Luke, captains Under 19 Bundesliga club Borussia Dortmund II.

== Career statistics ==
=== Club ===
Appearances and goals by club, season and competition
Club	Season	League			DFB-Pokal		DFL-Ligapokal		Continental		Total		Ref.
Club	Season	Division	Apps	Goals	Apps	Goals	Apps	Goals	Apps	Goals	Apps	Goals	Ref.
VfL Bochum II	1996–97	Verbandsliga Westfalen	15	3	—		—		—		15	3	
VfL Bochum II	1997–98	Oberliga Westfalen	17	1	—		—		—		17	1	
VfL Bochum II	1998–99	Oberliga Westfalen	0	0	—		—		—		0	0	
VfL Bochum II	1999–00	Regionalliga Süd/Südwest	14	0	—		—		—		14	0	
VfL Bochum II	2000–01	Oberliga Westfalen	15	3	—		—		—		15	3	
VfL Bochum II	Total		61	7	0	0	0	0	0	0	61	7	–
VfL Bochum	1996–97	Bundesliga	4	0	0	0	—		—		4	0	
VfL Bochum	1997–98	Bundesliga	7	0	0	0	0	0	1	0	8	0	
VfL Bochum	1998–99	Bundesliga	18	1	3	1	—		—		21	2	
VfL Bochum	1999–00	2. Bundesliga	4	0	0	0	—		—		4	0	
VfL Bochum	2000–01	Bundesliga	18	2	2	0	—		—		20	2	
VfL Bochum	2001–02	2. Bundesliga	26	3	2	0	—		—		28	3	
VfL Bochum	2002–03	Bundesliga	26	3	4	1	—		—		30	4	
VfL Bochum	2003–04	Bundesliga	33	7	1	0	1	0	—		35	7	
VfL Bochum	Total		136	16	12	2	1	0	1	0	150	18	–
Werder Bremen	2004–05	Bundesliga	16	0	2	0	2	0	3	0	23	0	
Werder Bremen	2005–06	Bundesliga	23	1	2	0	1	0	5	0	31	1	
Werder Bremen	2006–07	Bundesliga	0	0	0	0	2	0	0	0	2	0	
Werder Bremen	Total		39	1	4	0	5	0	8	0	56	1	–
Hannover 96	2006–07	Bundesliga	26	2	2	0	—		—		28	2	
Hannover 96	2007–08	Bundesliga	23	2	1	0	—		—		24	2	
Hannover 96	2008–09	Bundesliga	22	1	1	0	—		—		23	1	
Hannover 96	Total		71	5	4	0	0	0	0	0	75	5	–
MSV Duisburg	2009–10	2. Bundesliga	21	3	2	0	—		—		23	2	
Schalke 04 II	2010–11	Regionalliga West	31	2	—		—		—		31	2	
Schalke 04 II	2011–12	Regionalliga West	29	2	—		—		—		29	2	
Schalke 04 II	Total		60	4	0	0	0	0	0	0	60	4	–
Career total			388	36	22	2	6	0	9	0	425	38	–

== Honours ==
Werder Bremen

- DFL-Ligapokal: 2006
