= Thomas Ernst =

German footballer (born 1967)

Personal information
- Date of birth: 23 December 1967 (age 58)
- Place of birth: Wiesbaden, West Germany
- Height: 1.93 m (6 ft 4 in)
- Position: Goalkeeper

Youth career
- 1974–1981: FV Biebrich
- 1981–1986: Eintracht Frankfurt

Senior career*
Years	Team	Apps	(Gls)
1986–1991	Eintracht Frankfurt II	126	(0)
1987–1994	Eintracht Frankfurt	5	(0)
1994–1995	FSV Frankfurt	27	(0)
1995–2000	VfL Bochum	71	(0)
2001–2003	VfB Stuttgart	19	(0)
2003–2006	1. FC Kaiserslautern	30	(0)
2004–2005	→ 1. FC Kaiserslautern II	1	(0)
Total		279	(0)

Managerial career
- 2007–2008: FSV Frankfurt
Medal record
Eintracht Frankfurt
Winner	DFB-Pokal	1987–88
VfL Bochum
Winner	2. Bundesliga	1995–96
Runner-up	2. Bundesliga	1999–00
VfB Stuttgart
Runner-up	Bundesliga	2002–03
- * Club domestic league appearances and goals

Thomas Ernst (born 23 December 1967) is a German former professional footballer who played as a goalkeeper.

== Career ==
Ernst was born in Wiesbaden, Hesse. He started playing professionally with Eintracht Frankfurt. At the Hessian club, he could only amass five Bundesliga appearances in seven years combined, being barred by legendary Uli Stein. In 1994, he moved clubs but stayed in the city, joining FSV Frankfurt in the second division.

After one season, Ernst joined VfL Bochum also in level two, only appearing twice in his first two seasons combined. His best individual year happened in 1998–99, when he appeared in 32 league games, but the North Rhine-Westphalia side suffered top flight relegation, as second from bottom.

From 2000 to 2006, Ernst remained in the top division, with VfB Stuttgart and 1. FC Kaiserslautern, but again appeared almost exclusively as a backup, until his retirement at the age of 38. In 19 professional seasons, he appeared in 152 league games, 106 of those in the first division.

Ernst moved into managing immediately after retiring, working as a goalkeeper coach with Germany women's national team. The following year, he had his first head coach experience, with former club FSV Frankfurt, and returned to Bochum in 2008, as director of football.

== Personal life ==
Ernst's wife, Kerstin Pohlmann, was also a professional footballer. His son Tjark is currently a football goalkeeper with the Dutch club Feyenoord.

== Career statistics ==
Club	Season	League			DFB-Pokal		Europe		Total	
Club	Season	Division	Apps	Goals	Apps	Goals	Apps	Goals	Apps	Goals
Eintracht Frankfurt II	1986–87	Oberliga Hessen	5	0	–		–		5	0
Eintracht Frankfurt II	1987–88	Oberliga Hessen	30	0	–		–		30	0
Eintracht Frankfurt II	1988–89	Oberliga Hessen	33	0	–		–		33	0
Eintracht Frankfurt II	1989–90	Oberliga Hessen	30	0	–		–		30	0
Eintracht Frankfurt II	1990–91	Oberliga Hessen	28	0	–		–		28	0
Eintracht Frankfurt II	Total		126	0	0	0	0	0	126	0
Eintracht Frankfurt	1987–88	Bundesliga	1	0	0	0	–		1	0
Eintracht Frankfurt	1988–89	Bundesliga	0	0	0	0	0	0	0	0
Eintracht Frankfurt	1989–90	Bundesliga	0	0	0	0	–		0	0
Eintracht Frankfurt	1990–91	Bundesliga	0	0	0	0	–		0	0
Eintracht Frankfurt	1991–92	Bundesliga	0	0	0	0	0	0	0	0
Eintracht Frankfurt	1992–93	Bundesliga	0	0	0	0	0	0	0	0
Eintracht Frankfurt	1993–94	Bundesliga	4	0	0	0	0	0	0	0
Eintracht Frankfurt	Total		5	0	0	0	0	0	5	0
FSV Frankfurt	1994–95	2. Bundesliga	27	0	0	0	–		27	0
VfL Bochum	1995–96	2. Bundesliga	1	0	0	0	–		1	0
VfL Bochum	1996–97	Bundesliga	1	0	0	0	–		1	0
VfL Bochum	1997–98	Bundesliga	18	0	0	0	1	0	19	0
VfL Bochum	1998–99	Bundesliga	32	0	2	0	–		34	0
VfL Bochum	1999–00	2. Bundesliga	18	0	3	0	–		21	0
VfL Bochum	2000–01	Bundesliga	1	0	0	0	–		1	0
VfL Bochum	Total		71	0	5	0	1	0	77	0
Stuttgart	2000–01	Bundesliga	2	0	0	0	0	0	2	0
Stuttgart	2001–02	Bundesliga	3	0	0	0	–		3	0
Stuttgart	2002–03	Bundesliga	14	0	1	0	4	0	19	0
Stuttgart	Total		19	0	1	0	4	0	24	0
Kaiserslautern	2003–04	Bundesliga	6	0	0	0	0	0	6	0
Kaiserslautern	2004–05	Bundesliga	21	0	2	0	–		23	0
Kaiserslautern	2005–06	Bundesliga	3	0	1	0	–		4	0
Kaiserslautern	Total		30	0	3	0	0	0	33	0
Kaiserslautern II	2004–05	Oberliga Südwest	1	0	–		–		1	0
Career total			279	0	9	0	5	0	293	0

== Honours ==
VfB Stuttgart

- UEFA Intertoto Cup: 2002
