= Martin Meichelbeck =

German former professional footballer (born 1976)

Personal information
- Full name: Martin Meichelbeck
- Date of birth: 21 November 1976 (age 49)
- Place of birth: Bamberg, West Germany
- Height: 1.89 m (6 ft 2 in)
- Position: Centre-back

Youth career
- 1983–1992: FC Baunach
- 1992–1993: 1. FC Nürnberg
- 1993–1995: 1. FC Bamberg

Senior career*
Years	Team	Apps	(Gls)
1995–1996	1. FC Bamberg		
1996–1998	SpVgg Jahn Forchheim	66	(13)
1998–2000	Greuther Fürth II	12	(1)
1998–2000	Greuther Fürth	35	(5)
2000–2008	VfL Bochum	126	(9)
2003–2007	→ VfL Bochum II	4	(0)
2008–2010	Greuther Fürth	7	(0)
Total		250	(28)

International career
2002	Germany B	1	(0)
- * Club domestic league appearances and goals

Martin Meichelbeck (born 21 November 1976) is a German former professional footballer who played as a centre-back.

== Career ==
Meichelbeck was born in Bamberg (Franconia). His first football club was FC Baunach. He played one season in the youth team of 1. FC Nürnberg. The next clubs were 1. FC Bamberg and SpVgg Jahn Forchheim.

=== Greuther Fürth ===
Meichelbeck started his professional career at 2. Bundesliga club SpVgg Greuther Fürth in 1998. At this point, he decided to start a professional football career. He was still studying medicine till that time. Meichelbeck played for Greuther Fürth until 2000.

=== VfL Bochum ===
In 2000, Meichelbeck moved to VfL Bochum. Meichelbeck is the player who has played the most matches for VfL Bochum in the 2007–08 squad. Highlights of this period are his one UEFA Cup match with VfL Bochum against Standard Liège and one match with the German Team 2006. He also relegated and promoted twice with his club. In his professional career, Meichelbeck has gotten only one red card.

=== Return to Greuther Fürth ===
In 2008 Meichelbeck return to SpVgg Greuther Fürth for two seasons.

== Personal life ==
Meichelbeck studied Social Behaviour Science at the FernUniversität Hagen. He had ten years of piano lessons and is still a devoted piano player in his free time.

== Career statistics ==
Appearances and goals by club, season and competition
Club	Season	League			DFB-Pokal		DFB-Ligapokal		Europe		Total	
Club	Season	Division	Apps	Goals	Apps	Goals	Apps	Goals	Apps	Goals	Apps	Goals
1. FC Bamberg	1995–96	Bezirksoberliga Oberfranken			—		—		—			
SpVgg Jahn Forchheim	1996–97	Oberliga Bayern	33	5	—		—		—		33	5
SpVgg Jahn Forchheim	1997–98	Oberliga Bayern	33	8	—		—		—		33	8
SpVgg Jahn Forchheim	Total		66	13	0	0	0	0	0	0	66	13
Greuther Fürth II	1998–99	Bezirksoberliga Mittelfranken	10	1	—		—		—		10	1
Greuther Fürth II	1999–00	Bezirksoberliga Mittelfranken	2	0	—		—		—		2	0
Greuther Fürth II	Total		12	1	0	0	0	0	0	0	12	1
Greuther Fürth	1998–99	2. Bundesliga	6	0	0	0	—		—		6	0
Greuther Fürth	1999–00	2. Bundesliga	29	5	2	0	—		—		31	5
Greuther Fürth	Total		35	5	2	0	0	0	0	0	37	5
VfL Bochum	2000–01	Bundesliga	19	0	4	0	—		—		23	0
VfL Bochum	2001–02	2. Bundesliga	17	2	1	0	—		—		18	2
VfL Bochum	2002–03	Bundesliga	22	0	3	0	—		—		25	0
VfL Bochum	2003–04	Bundesliga	12	3	0	0	0	0	—		12	3
VfL Bochum	2004–05	Bundesliga	22	1	1	0	0	0	1	0	24	1
VfL Bochum	2005–06	2. Bundesliga	20	3	1	1	—		—		21	4
VfL Bochum	2006–07	Bundesliga	9	0	2	0	—		—		11	0
VfL Bochum	2007–08	Bundesliga	5	0	1	0	—		—		6	0
VfL Bochum	Total		126	9	13	1	0	0	1	0	140	10
VfL Bochum II	2003–04	Oberliga Westfalen	3	0	—		—		—		3	0
VfL Bochum II	2007–08	Oberliga Westfalen	1	0	—		—		—		1	0
VfL Bochum II	Total		4	0	0	0	0	0	0	0	4	0
Greuther Fürth	2008–09	2. Bundesliga	4	0	1	0	—		—		5	0
Greuther Fürth	2009–10	2. Bundesliga	3	0	0	0	—		—		3	0
Greuther Fürth	Total		7	0	1	0	0	0	0	0	8	0
Career total					16	1	0	0	1	0		
