= Rouven Schröder =

German footballer (born 1975)

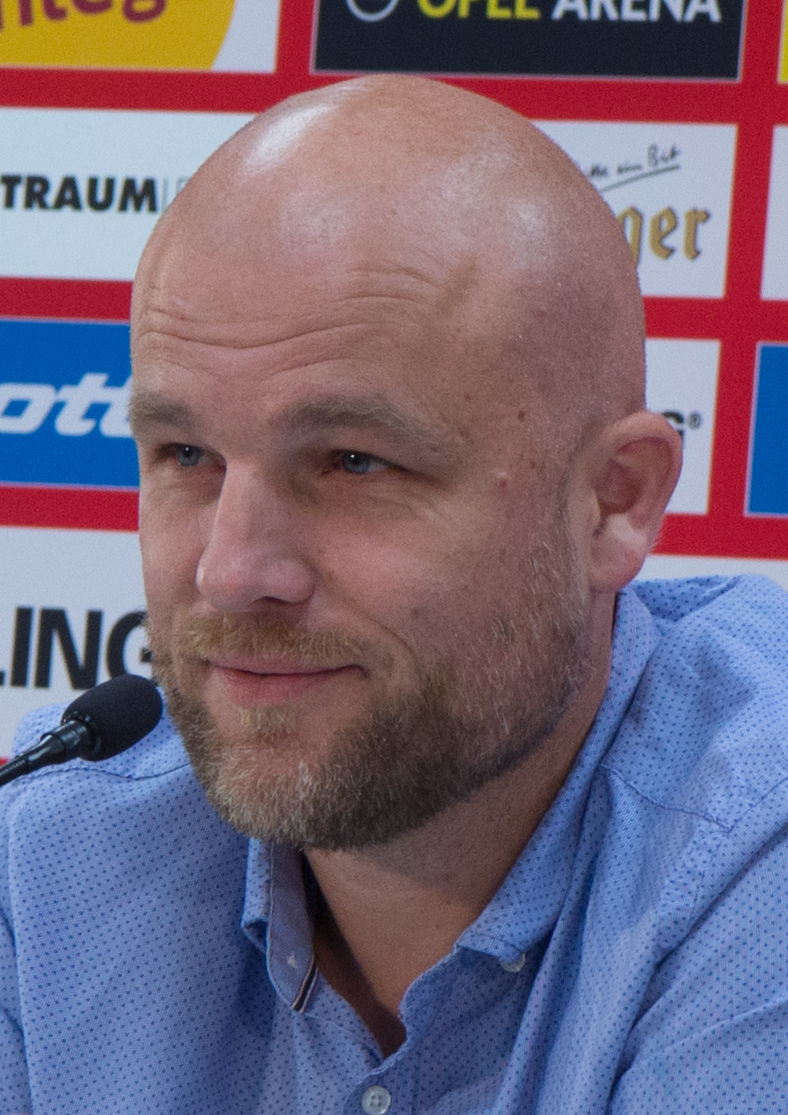
- Schröder in 2018

Personal information
- Date of birth: 18 October 1975 (age 51)
- Place of birth: Arnsberg, West Germany
- Height: 1.87 m (6 ft 2 in)
- Position: Defender

Youth career
- SV Arnsberg
- SC Neheim-Hüsten
- –1999: SSV Meschede

Senior career*
Years	Team	Apps	(Gls)
1999–2001	VfL Bochum II	61	(1)
2001–2002	VfL Bochum	24	(3)
2002–2004	MSV Duisburg	32	(1)
2004–2007	VfB Lübeck	92	(4)
2007–2009	VfL Bochum II	53	(0)
2010	VfB Lübeck	0	(0)
2010–2011	NTSV Strand 08	0	(0)

Managerial career
- 2009: VfL Bochum II (assistant)
- * Club domestic league appearances and goals

Rouven Schröder (born 18 October 1975) is a German former professional footballer. As of 2023 he is sporting director of RB Leipzig.

== Playing career ==
Schröder made his debut on the professional league level in the Bundesliga for VfL Bochum on 1 April 2001, when he started in a game against Energie Cottbus. On 11 November 2009, he returned to VfB Lübeck.

== Administrative career ==
From June 2021 until 26 October 2022, Schröder was Sporting Director of Schalke 04.

== Career statistics ==
Club performance			League		Cup		Total	
Season	Club	League	Apps	Goals	Apps	Goals	Apps	Goals
Germany			League		DFB-Pokal		Total	
1999–00	VfL Bochum II	Oberliga Westfalen	38	0	—		38	0
2000–01	VfL Bochum II	Oberliga Westfalen	23	1	—		23	1
2000–01	VfL Bochum	Bundesliga	8	0	0	0	8	0
2001–02	VfL Bochum	2. Bundesliga	16	3	0	0	16	3
2002–03	MSV Duisburg	2. Bundesliga	13	0	0	0	13	0
2003–04	MSV Duisburg	2. Bundesliga	19	1	4	1	23	2
2004–05	MSV Duisburg	2. Bundesliga	0	0	1	0	1	0
2004–05	VfB Lübeck	Regionalliga Nord	29	3	0	0	29	3
2005–06	VfB Lübeck	Regionalliga Nord	33	0	—		33	0
2006–07	VfB Lübeck	Regionalliga Nord	30	1	2	1	32	2
2007–08	VfL Bochum II	Oberliga Westfalen	31	0	—		31	0
2008–09	VfL Bochum II	Regionalliga West	20	0	—		20	0
2009–10	VfL Bochum II	Regionalliga West	2	0	—		2	0
2009–10	VfB Lübeck	Regionalliga Nord	0	0	0	0	0	0
2010–11	NTSV Strand 08	Schleswig-Holstein-Liga	0	0	—		0	0
Total	Germany		262	9	7	2	269	11
Career total			262	9	7	2	269	11
