= César M'Boma =

Cameroonian footballer

Personal information
- Full name: César Emmanuel Ndedi M'Boma
- Date of birth: 18 February 1979 (age 47)
- Place of birth: Douala, Cameroon
- Height: 1.68 m (5 ft 6 in)
- Position: Forward

Youth career
- Caen

Senior career*
Years	Team	Apps	(Gls)
1998–1999	Sion	8	(1)
1999–2000	VfL Bochum II	13	(1)
2000–2001	SC Göttingen 05	11	(2)
2001–2002	Jahn Regensburg	7	(0)
2002–2003	Chemnitzer FC	20	(2)
2003–2004	Bourg-Péronnas	16	(5)
2004–2005	VfL Wolfsburg II	18	(3)
2005–2006	Waldhof Mannheim	20	(4)
2006–2007	1. FC Eschborn	18	(7)
2007–2008	SG Sonnenhof Großaspach	8	(2)
2008–2009	FC Oberneuland	14	(3)
2009–2010	TuS Koblenz	7	(0)
2010–2012	Persitara North Jakarta	20	(5)
Total		180	(35)
- * Club domestic league appearances and goals

César M'Boma (born 18 February 1979) is a Cameroonian former professional football forward.
