= Peter Peschel =

German footballer

Personal information
- Date of birth: 26 January 1972 (age 54)
- Place of birth: Prudnik, Poland
- Height: 1.75 m (5 ft 9 in)
- Position: Midfielder

Youth career
- Rot-Weiß Unna
- SpVgg Bönen
- –1990: Borussia Dortmund

Senior career*
| Years | Team | Apps | (Gls) |
| 1990–2001 | VfL Bochum | 248 | (53) |
| 2001–2002 | MSV Duisburg | 12 | (3) |
| 2003 | Jahn Regensburg | 12 | (8) |
| 2003–2004 | MSV Duisburg | 14 | (0) |
| 2004–2005 | Tennis Borussia Berlin | 16 | (7) |
| Total | | 302 | (71) |
- * Club domestic league appearances and goals

Peter Peschel (born 26 January 1972) is a German former professional football who played mainly as a midfielder. He was with his family resettled as Aussiedler from Poland to West Germany at the age of five. Peschel was married to a gymnast Magdalena Brzeska, with whom he had two children.

== Career statistics ==
Appearances and goals by club, season and competition
| Club | Season | League | | | National cup | | League cup | | Continental | | Total | |
| Club | Season | Division | Apps | Goals | Apps | Goals | Apps | Goals | Apps | Goals | Apps | Goals |
|---|---|---|---|---|---|---|---|---|---|---|---|---|
| VfL Bochum | 1990–91 | Bundesliga | 29 | 5 | | | — | | — | | | |
| VfL Bochum | 1991–92 | Bundesliga | 13 | 0 | 0 | 0 | — | | — | | 13 | 0 |
| VfL Bochum | 1992–93 | Bundesliga | 7 | 0 | 1 | 0 | — | | — | | 8 | 0 |
| VfL Bochum | 1993–94 | 2. Bundesliga | 29 | 2 | 1 | 0 | — | | — | | 30 | 2 |
| VfL Bochum | 1994–95 | Bundesliga | 23 | 4 | 1 | 0 | — | | — | | 24 | 4 |
| VfL Bochum | 1995–96 | 2. Bundesliga | 31 | 11 | 1 | 0 | — | | — | | 32 | 11 |
| VfL Bochum | 1996–97 | Bundesliga | 22 | 5 | 3 | 2 | — | | — | | 25 | 7 |
| VfL Bochum | 1997–98 | Bundesliga | 24 | 6 | 1 | 0 | 1 | 0 | 5 | 1 | 31 | 7 |
| VfL Bochum | 1998–99 | Bundesliga | 16 | 2 | 2 | 1 | — | | — | | 18 | 3 |
| VfL Bochum | 1999–00 | 2. Bundesliga | 34 | 15 | 3 | 1 | — | | — | | 37 | 16 |
| VfL Bochum | 2000–01 | Bundesliga | 20 | 3 | 2 | 2 | — | | — | | 22 | 5 |
| VfL Bochum | Total | | 248 | 53 | 15 | 6 | 1 | 0 | 5 | 1 | 269 | 60 |
| MSV Duisburg | 2001–02 | 2. Bundesliga | 12 | 3 | 1 | 0 | — | | — | | 13 | 3 |
| Jahn Regensburg | 2002–03 | Regionalliga | 12 | 8 | 0 | 0 | — | | — | | 12 | 8 |
| MSV Duisburg | 2003–04 | 2. Bundesliga | 14 | 0 | 1 | 0 | — | | — | | 15 | 0 |
| Tennis Borussia Berlin | 2004–05 | Oberliga | 16 | 7 | — | | — | | — | | 16 | 7 |
| Career total | | | 302 | 71 | 17 | 6 | 1 | 0 | 5 | 1 | 325 | 78 |
