= Sascha Siebert =

German footballer

Personal information
- Date of birth: November 28, 1977 (age 48)
- Height: 1.80 m (5 ft 11 in)
- Position: Striker

Youth career
- BC Sport Kassel
- SC Neukirchen
- FSV Frankfurt

Senior career*
Years	Team	Apps	(Gls)
–1999	KSV Hessen Kassel		
1999–2001	VfL Bochum II	87	(41)
2001	VfL Bochum	1	(0)
2002	SC Paderborn 07	22	(0)
2003–2004	SSVg Velbert		
2004–2006	SpVgg Germania Ratingen 04/19		
2006–2007	SV Sodingen		
2008	Germania Gladbeck	14	(7)
2008–2010	SV Schermbeck	9	(1)
- * Club domestic league appearances and goals as of 21:07, 2 February 2009 (UTC)

Sascha Siebert (born November 28, 1977) is a German former footballer. He made his debut on the professional league level in the Bundesliga for VfL Bochum on March 10, 2001 when he came on as a half-time substitute in a game against 1. FC Köln.
