= Mike Rietpietsch =

German footballer

Personal information
- Date of birth: 26 March 1974 (age 52)
- Place of birth: Eberswalde, East Germany
- Height: 1.80 m (5 ft 11 in)
- Position: Midfielder

Youth career
- 1981–1987: BSG Stahl Finow
- 1987–1993: FC Vorwärts Frankfurt/Oder

Senior career*
| Years | Team | Apps | (Gls) |
| 1993–1994 | Union Berlin | | |
| 1994–1997 | Bayer Leverkusen | 22 | (0) |
| 1997–1998 | Fortuna Düsseldorf | 28 | (3) |
| 1998–1999 | SC Freiburg | 13 | (0) |
| 1999–2001 | VfL Bochum | 13 | (0) |
| 2001–2005 | Rot-Weiß Oberhausen | 113 | (20) |
| 2005 | MSV Duisburg | 13 | (0) |
| 2006 | → Holstein Kiel (loan) | 10 | (2) |
| 2006–2009 | Wuppertaler SV Borussia | 69 | (12) |
| 2010 | Bonner SC | 12 | (1) |
| 2011–2012 | Ratingen 04/19 | | |

International career
| 1994 | Germany U-21 | 1 | (0) |
- * Club domestic league appearances and goals

Mike Rietpietsch (born 26 March 1974) is a German former professional footballer who played as a midfielder.

== Honours ==
- Bundesliga runner-up: 1996–97
