= Jan Majewski =

German footballer

Personal information
- Date of birth: 27 November 1973 (age 52)
- Height: 1.82 m (6 ft 0 in)
- Position: Forward

Youth career
- FC Hilchenbach

Senior career*
Years	Team	Apps	(Gls)
–1996	SV Langenau		
1996–2000	VfL Bochum II		
1998–2000	VfL Bochum	2	(0)
2000–2001	SC Verl	19	(3)
2001–2002	SV Wilhelmshaven		
2002–2005	VfB Oldenburg		
2005–	SV Tungeln		
- * Club domestic league appearances and goals

Jan Majewski (born 27 November 1973) is a German former professional footballer who played as a forward.
