= Ralf Zumdick =

German footballer

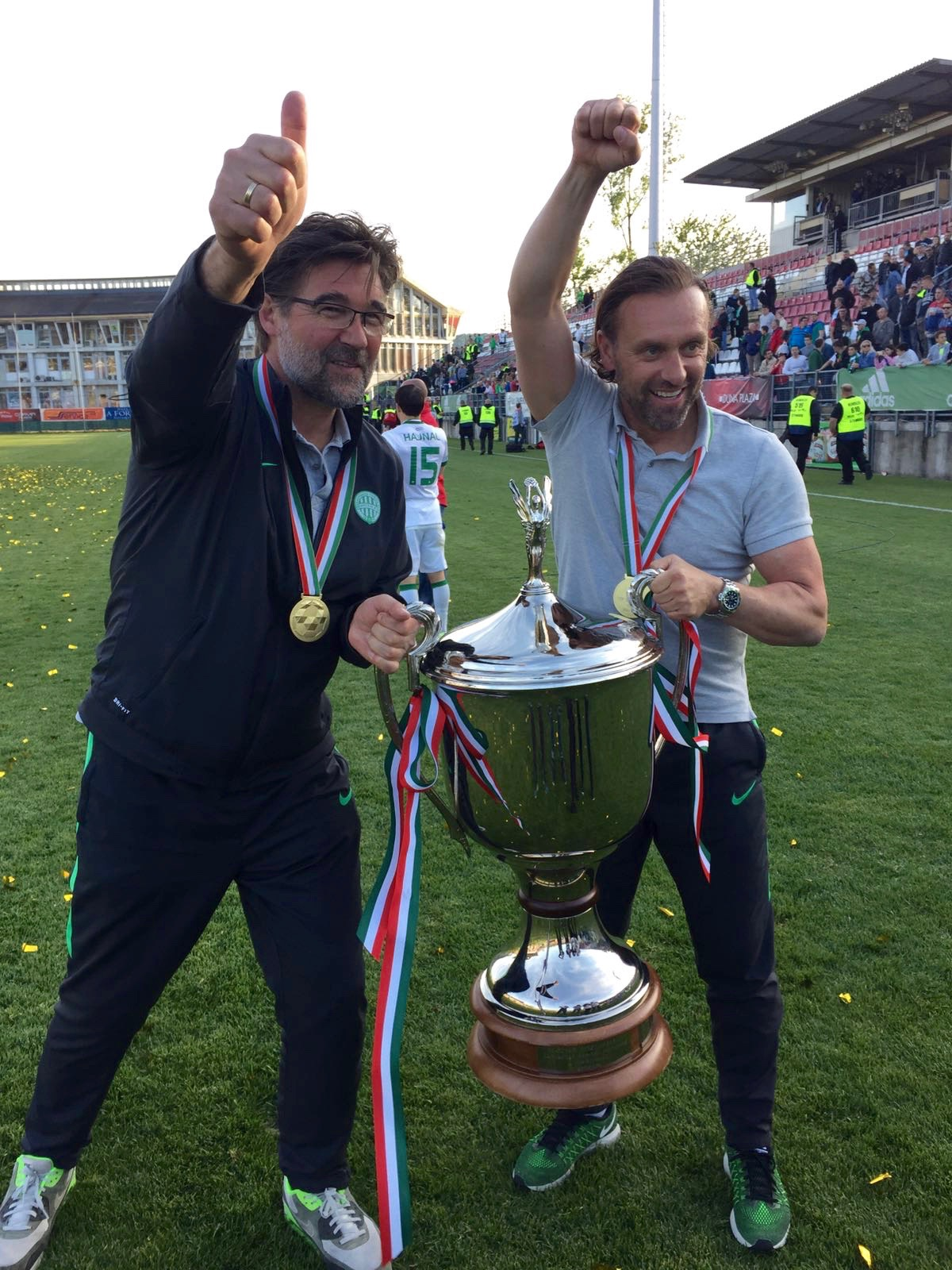
- Zumdick with Thomas Doll in 2016

Personal information
- Full name: Ralf Christoph Bernard Zumdick
- Date of birth: 10 May 1958 (age 68)
- Place of birth: Münster, West Germany
- Height: 1.88 m (6 ft 2 in)
- Position: Goalkeeper

Youth career
- 1976–1980: Preußen Münster

Senior career*
Years	Team	Apps	(Gls)
1980–1981	Preußen Münster	20	(0)
1981–1995	VfL Bochum	283	(1)

International career
1985–1990	West Germany Olympic	3	(0)
1986	West Germany B	1	(0)

Managerial career
- 1995–1999: VfL Bochum (assistant coach)
- 1999–2001: VfL Bochum
- 2002: Asante Kotoko Kumasi
- 2003: Ghana
- 2003–2007: Hamburger SV (assistant coach)
- 2007–2008: Borussia Dortmund (assistant coach)
- 2009–2010: Gençlerbirliği (assistant coach)
- 2010–2011: Gençlerbirliği
- 2011–2012: Persepolis (assistant coach)
- 2013–2018: Ferencváros (assistant coach)
- 2019: Hannover 96 (assistant coach)
- 2019: APOEL (assistant coach)
- * Club domestic league appearances and goals

Ralf Christoph Bernard Zumdick (born 10 May 1958) is a German former professional footballer who played as a goalkeeper. After his career (21 2. Bundesliga, 282 Bundesliga games; one goal) Zumdick was assistant coach at VfL Bochum from 1995 until 1999. Zumdick is often cited as the player who pioneered the practice of the penalty-taking-goalkeeper when he scored against Andreas Köpke in 1988. He was most recently manager Thomas Doll's assistant coach at APOEL.

== Career statistics ==
Appearances and goals by club, season and competition
Club	Season	League			DFB-Pokal		Total	
Club	Season	Division	Apps	Goals	Apps	Goals	Apps	Goals
Preußen Münster	1980–81	2. Bundesliga	20	0	0	0	20	0
VfL Bochum	1981–82	Bundesliga	18	0	4	0	22	0
VfL Bochum	1982–83	Bundesliga	33	0	5	0	38	0
VfL Bochum	1983–84	Bundesliga	31	0	1	0	32	0
VfL Bochum	1984–85	Bundesliga	34	0	2	0	36	0
VfL Bochum	1985–86	Bundesliga	10	0	4	0	14	0
VfL Bochum	1986–87	Bundesliga	34	0	1	0	35	0
VfL Bochum	1987–88	Bundesliga	29	1	6	0	35	1
VfL Bochum	1988–89	Bundesliga	29	0	2	0	31	0
VfL Bochum	1989–90	Bundesliga	17	0	2	0	19	0
VfL Bochum	1990–91	Bundesliga	0	0	0	0	0	0
VfL Bochum	1991–92	Bundesliga	28	0	0	0	28	0
VfL Bochum	1992–93	Bundesliga	19	0	0	0	19	0
VfL Bochum	1993–94	2. Bundesliga	1	0	0	0	1	0
VfL Bochum	1994–95	Bundesliga	0	0	0	0	0	0
VfL Bochum	Total		283	1	27	0	310	1
Career total			303	1	27	0	330	1
