= Jacek Ratajczak =

Polish footballer

Personal information
- Full name: Jacek Ratajczak
- Date of birth: 10 July 1973 (age 53)
- Place of birth: Człopa, Poland
- Height: 1.92 m (6 ft 4 in)
- Position: Forward

Senior career*
Years	Team	Apps	(Gls)
1994–1995	Flota Świnoujście		
1995	Pogoń Szczecin	2	(0)
1996	Chemik Police		
1997	Pogoń Szczecin		
1997–1998	Flota Świnoujście		
1998–2000	VfL Bochum II	35	(7)
2000–2001	SV Babelsberg 03	10	(1)
2001–2002	Widzew Łódź	1	(0)
2002–2006	Flota Świnoujście		
2009	Kwisa Świeradów Zdrój		
- * Club domestic league appearances and goals

Jacek Ratajczak (born 10 July 1973) is a Polish former professional footballer who played as a forward.
