= Björn Joppe =

German football manager (born 1978)

Personal information
- Date of birth: 13 December 1978 (age 47)
- Place of birth: Wuppertal, West Germany
- Height: 1.90 m (6 ft 3 in)
- Position: Midfielder

Team information
- Current team: FC Remscheid (manager)

Youth career
- Bayer Uerdingen

Senior career*
Years	Team	Apps	(Gls)
1995–1996	Wuppertaler SV		
1996–2001	VfL Bochum II		
1998–2003	VfL Bochum	11	(0)
2003–2004	Union Berlin	12	(0)
2004–2006	VfL Osnabrück	61	(13)
2006–2008	VfR Aalen	5	(3)
2008	SSVg Velbert	14	(0)

Managerial career
- 2009–2010: Sportfreunde Schwäbisch Hall U15
- 2012–2017: SV Jägerhaus Linde (player-manager)
- 2017: SSV Germania Wuppertal
- 2018: 1. FC Lokomotive Leipzig (caretaker)
- 2020: TuS Bersenbrück
- 2020–2021: Bonner SC
- 2022–2023: KFC Uerdingen 05
- 2023–2025: Rot Weiss Ahlen
- 2025–: FC Remscheid
- * Club domestic league appearances and goals

Björn Joppe (born 13 December 1978) is a German former professional football player and manager. He is currently the manager of FC Remscheid.

== Career ==
Joppe was born in Wuppertal. He spent two seasons in the Bundesliga with VfL Bochum.

== Coaching career ==
In the summer of 2009, Joppe was named as manager of the C-Youth team of the club Sportfreunde Schwäbisch Hall.

In December 2022 he became the new manager of KFC Uerdingen 05. After a poor run of just two victories in eight games, he was sacked on 20 March 2023.

On 24 October 2023 he became the new manager of Rot Weiss Ahlen.

On 30 September 2025, Joppe was appointed new manager of FC Remscheid.
