= Marijo Marić =

Croatian footballer (born 1977)

Personal information
- Date of birth: 12 January 1977 (age 49)
- Place of birth: Heilbronn, West Germany
- Height: 1.83 m (6 ft 0 in)
- Position: Striker

Youth career
- ESV Heilbronn
- VfR Heilbronn

Senior career*
Years	Team	Apps	(Gls)
1995–1996	TSF Ditzingen	24	(8)
1996–1997	VfB Stuttgart II		
1997–1998	Waldhof Mannheim	5	(1)
1998–1999	SSV Reutlingen	47	(32)
1999–2001	VfL Bochum	46	(12)
1999–2000	→ VfL Bochum II	1	(0)
2001–2004	FC Kärnten	82	(33)
2004	Arminia Bielefeld	5	(0)
2005	Eintracht Trier	17	(4)
2005	SpVgg Unterhaching	11	(0)
2006–2008	VfR Aalen	53	(9)

International career
2001	Croatia B	1	(0)
2002–2004	Croatia	8	(1)
- * Club domestic league appearances and goals

Marijo Marić (born 12 January 1977) is a former professional footballer who played as a striker. Born in Germany, he played for the Croatia national team.

He is the brother of Tomislav Marić.

== Club career ==
Marić was born in Heilbronn, West Germany. He started his career at TSF Ditzingen, near Heilbronn, Baden-Württemberg. He was then signed by Stuttgart II, and then had spells at Waldhof Mannheim, SSV Reutlingen and VfL Bochum.

He then moved to Austrian club FC Kärnten and returned to Germany in summer 2004 when Arminia Bielefeld signed him for a two-year deal with a transfer fee of €150,000.

He just made five substitute appearances and then moved to Eintracht Trier in the 2. Bundesliga in January 2005. He then joined SpVgg Unterhaching also in the 2. Bundesliga and after that Regionalliga club VfR Aalen.

On 16 February 2009, he had an unsuccessful trial with Iranian club Esteghlal F.C. and joined later KSG Gerlingen.

== International career ==
While playing at FC Kärnten in the Austrian Bundesliga, he was called up to the Croatia national football team, for whom he earned eight caps and scored one goal. While six of these were friendly matches, two of them were Euro 2004 qualifying matches. His international goal came in the friendly match against Macedonia on 9 February 2003.

In the national team, he played three matches along with his brother Tomislav, two of them were Marijo replaced Tomislav, one of them were they both at the field at the same time.

He made his international debut in the friendly against Wales on 21 August 2002 and he played his last match against Slovakia, in a friendly match on 29 May 2004.

He also played a B friendly against Romania, on 30 January 2001.
