= Matthias Lust =

German footballer (born 1970)

Personal information
- Date of birth: 27 April 1970 (age 56)
- Place of birth: Heilbronn, West Germany
- Height: 1.86 m (6 ft 1 in)
- Position: Midfielder

Team information
- Current team: Dynamo Dresden U19 (Manager); Dynamo Dresden (Assistant)

Senior career*
Years	Team	Apps	(Gls)
- SpVgg Ludwigsburg
- Stuttgarter Kickers
1990–1991	Karlsruher SC	7	(0)
1991–1992	Waldhof Mannheim	27	(6)
1992–1995	1. FC Saarbrücken	85	(12)
1995–1999	SpVgg Unterhaching	134	(11)
1999–2001	VfL Bochum	26	(2)
2001–2005	SpVgg Unterhaching	81	(3)

Managerial career
- 2006–2007: SpVgg Unterhaching U19
- 2007–2010: SpVgg Unterhaching (assistant)
- 2010: SpVgg Unterhaching (caretaker)
- 2010–2012: SpVgg Unterhaching (assistant)
- 2012–2015: FC Augsburg U17
- 2015–: Dynamo Dresden U19
- 2015–: Dynamo Dresden (assistant)
- * Club domestic league appearances and goals

Matthias Lust (born 27 April 1970) is a German football coach and a former player.

== Playing career ==
Lust was born in Heilbronn. He made his debut as a player on the professional league level in the Bundesliga for Karlsruher SC on 12 October 1990 when he started in a game against SG Wattenscheid 09.

== Coaching career ==
Lust started as a head coach in the youth ranks of SpVgg Unterhaching in July 2007 before being promoted to assistant coach of the first team. Lust became interim head coach when Ralph Hasenhüttl was sacked by Unterhaching in February 2010. The interim role ended when Klaus Augenthaler took the reins as head coach. Lust returned to his role as assistant coach when Augenthaler took over and continued in the role until June 2011. Lust became a youth team coach for FC Augsburg in July 2012.

On 8 May 2015, it was confirmed, that Lust was taking over Dynamo Dresden U19, alongside a role as second assistant coach belonging to the staff of the professional team and forms the interface between U19 and professionals.

== Coaching record ==
As of 28 January 2014

Team	From	To	Record					
Team	From	To	G	W	D	L	Win %	Ref.
SpVgg Unterhaching	22 February 2010	23 March 2010	3	0	0	3	0.00	
Total			3	0	0	3	0.00	—
