= Hilko Ristau =

German footballer

Personal information
- Date of birth: 24 April 1974 (age 52)
- Place of birth: Bremerhaven, West Germany
- Height: 1.90 m (6 ft 3 in)
- Position: Defender

Youth career
- TSV Bederkesa
- OSC Bremerhaven
- FC Bremerhaven

Senior career*
Years	Team	Apps	(Gls)
–1996	Bonner SC		
1996–1999	SG Wattenscheid 09	59	(4)
1999–2002	VfL Bochum	55	(6)
2002–2003	1. FC Saarbrücken	14	(1)
2004–2007	Rot-Weiss Essen	57	(3)
2007–2009	Bonner SC	11	(0)
- * Club domestic league appearances and goals

Hilko Ristau (born 24 April 1974) is a German former professional footballer who played as a defender. He made his debut on the professional league level in the 2. Bundesliga for SG Wattenscheid 09 on 29 August 1997 coming on as a substitute in the 31st minute in the game against SpVgg Unterhaching.
