= René Müller (footballer, born 1974) =

German footballer

Personal information
- Date of birth: 19 May 1974 (age 52)
- Place of birth: Minden, West Germany
- Height: 1.87 m (6 ft 2 in)
- Position: Striker

Team information
- Current team: Arminia Bielefeld (academy director)

Youth career
- Arminia Bielefeld

Senior career*
Years	Team	Apps	(Gls)
1993–1998	Bad Oeynhausen		
1998–1999	Preußen Münster		
1999–2000	VfL Bochum	10	(1)
2001–2002	Rot-Weiß Oberhausen	28	(5)
2002–2003	FC Augsburg	22	(1)
2003–2004	Rot-Weiß Erfurt	19	(12)
2004–2008	SC Paderborn	83	(24)
2008	Kickers Offenbach	0	(0)
2008–2009	Rot Weiss Ahlen	25	(3)

Managerial career
- 2011–2012: TuS Tengern
- 2012–2013: SC Paderborn II
- 2013: SC Paderborn (interim manager)
- 2013–2014: SC Paderborn II
- 2015: SC Paderborn (interim manager)
- 2016: SC Paderborn
- 2017–2018: Arminia Bielefeld II
- * Club domestic league appearances and goals

René Müller (born 19 May 1974) is a German former footballer, who currently works at the academy of Arminia Bielefeld.

== Coaching career ==
=== SC Paderborn 07 ===
Müller began his coaching career in November 2011, when he was appointed manager of Landesliga club TuS Tengern.

He left the position in June 2012, to join SC Paderborn 07 as manager of the club's youth academy and head coach of the U23/reserve squad. On 5 May 2013, Müller took over as interim coach of SC Paderborn's professional team for the rest of the season, following the dismissal of Stephan Schmidt. He was then replaced by André Breitenreiter at the end of the season.

At the end of December 2013, Müller once again took charge of the U23 team, this time on interim basis until the end of the season, beside his position as manager of the club's youth academy. After the season, he only continued with his duties as academy manager.

On 6 October 2015, Müller once again took charge of Paderborn's professional team on interim basis, following the departure of Markus Gellhaus. Müller was replaced on 13 October 2015 by Stefan Effenberg and continued his duties as academy manager. However, on 3 March 2016, Müller once again took over Paderborn's first team as the new head coach following the dismissal of Stefan Effenberg. Müller was, however, unable to prevent the team's relegation to the 3. Liga. In November 2016, he was released; Paderborn was in 17th place in the table at the time.

=== Arminia Bielefeld ===
At the end of January 2017 it was confirmed, that Müller from the upcoming 2017-18 season would take charge of Arminia Bielefeld's U23/reserve team. However, due to health problems, he had to resign from this position in February 2018.

In May 2018, Müller returned to work at Arminia, however, in a different position: He was appointed sporting director of Arminia's youth department from U16 to U19, starting from the 2018-19 season.
