= Sven Boy =

German footballer and coach

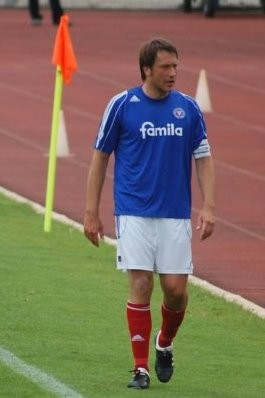
- Boy with Holstein Kiel

Personal information
- Date of birth: 2 October 1976 (age 50)
- Place of birth: West Germany
- Height: 1.85 m (6 ft 1 in)
- Position: Defender

Youth career
- FC Schöningen 08

Senior career*
Years	Team	Apps	(Gls)
–1995	VfL Wolfsburg II		
1995–1998	Eintracht Braunschweig	92	(16)
1998–1999	Arminia Bielefeld	18	(1)
1999–2000	VfL Bochum	7	(0)
2000–2003	Greuther Fürth	68	(0)
2003–2004	VfB Lübeck	24	(0)
2004–2010	Holstein Kiel	140	(6)
2006	→ Holstein Kiel II	1	(0)

Managerial career
- 2015–2017: VfR Neumünster (assistant)
- 2017–2018: VfR Neumünster
- * Club domestic league appearances and goals

Sven Boy (born 2 October 1976) is a German football coach and former footballer who most recently was in charge of VfR Neumünster.
