= Sebastian Schindzielorz =

German footballer (born 1979)

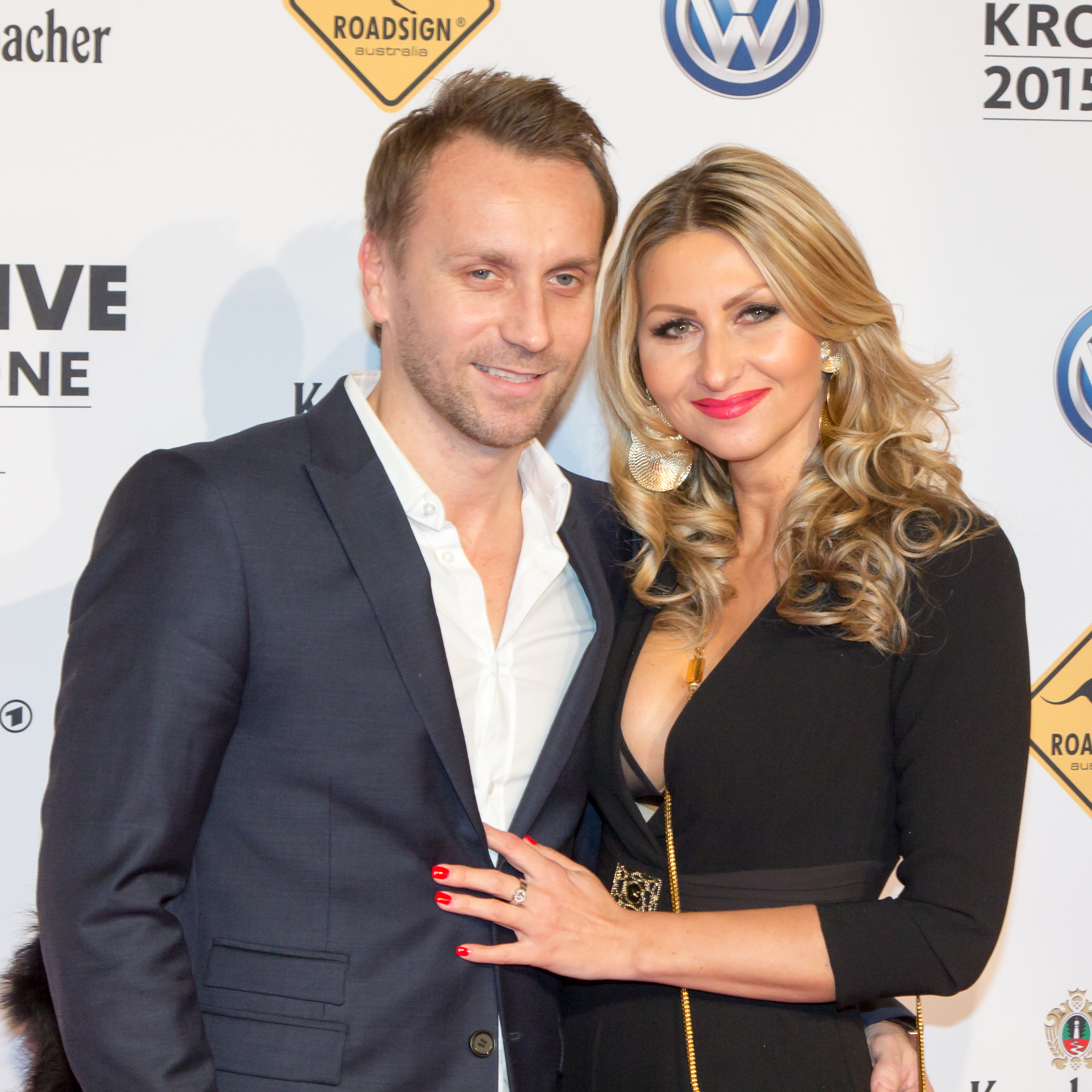
- Schindzielorz in 2015

Personal information
- Date of birth: 21 January 1979 (age 47)
- Place of birth: Krapkowice, Poland
- Height: 1.82 m (6 ft 0 in)
- Position: Defensive midfielder

Youth career
- 1988–1998: VfL Bochum

Senior career*
Years	Team	Apps	(Gls)
1997–1999	VfL Bochum II	30	(7)
1998–2003	VfL Bochum	136	(10)
2003–2006	1. FC Köln	50	(0)
2004–2005	1. FC Köln II	2	(0)
2006	Start	5	(0)
2007–2008	Levadiakos	22	(0)
2008–2011	VfL Wolfsburg	10	(0)
2008–2013	VfL Wolfsburg II	83	(4)
Total		338	(21)

International career
	Germany U21	16	(1)
2002	Germany B	1	(0)
- * Club domestic league appearances and goals

Sebastian Schindzielorz (born 21 January 1979) is a former professional footballer who played as a defensive midfielder. Born in Poland, he represented Germany at U21 youth level and made one appearance for Germany B.

== Club career ==
After being relegated with 1. FC Köln in 2006, Schindzielorz joined Norwegian club Start on a free transfer and was Stig Inge Bjørnebye's first signing as head coach of Start. After playing five matches for Start, Schindzielorz joined the Greek club Levadiakos, before he joined VfL Wolfsburg in 2008. In the 2008–09 season, he played six league matches when Wolfsburg won the league.

== International career ==
In May 2002, Schindzielorz was called up to the senior Germany squad for a match against Wales, however he remained on the bench and was ultimately never capped at that level.

== Honours ==
VfL Wolfsburg

- Bundesliga: 2008–09
