= Rainer Krieg =

German footballer and coach (born 1968)

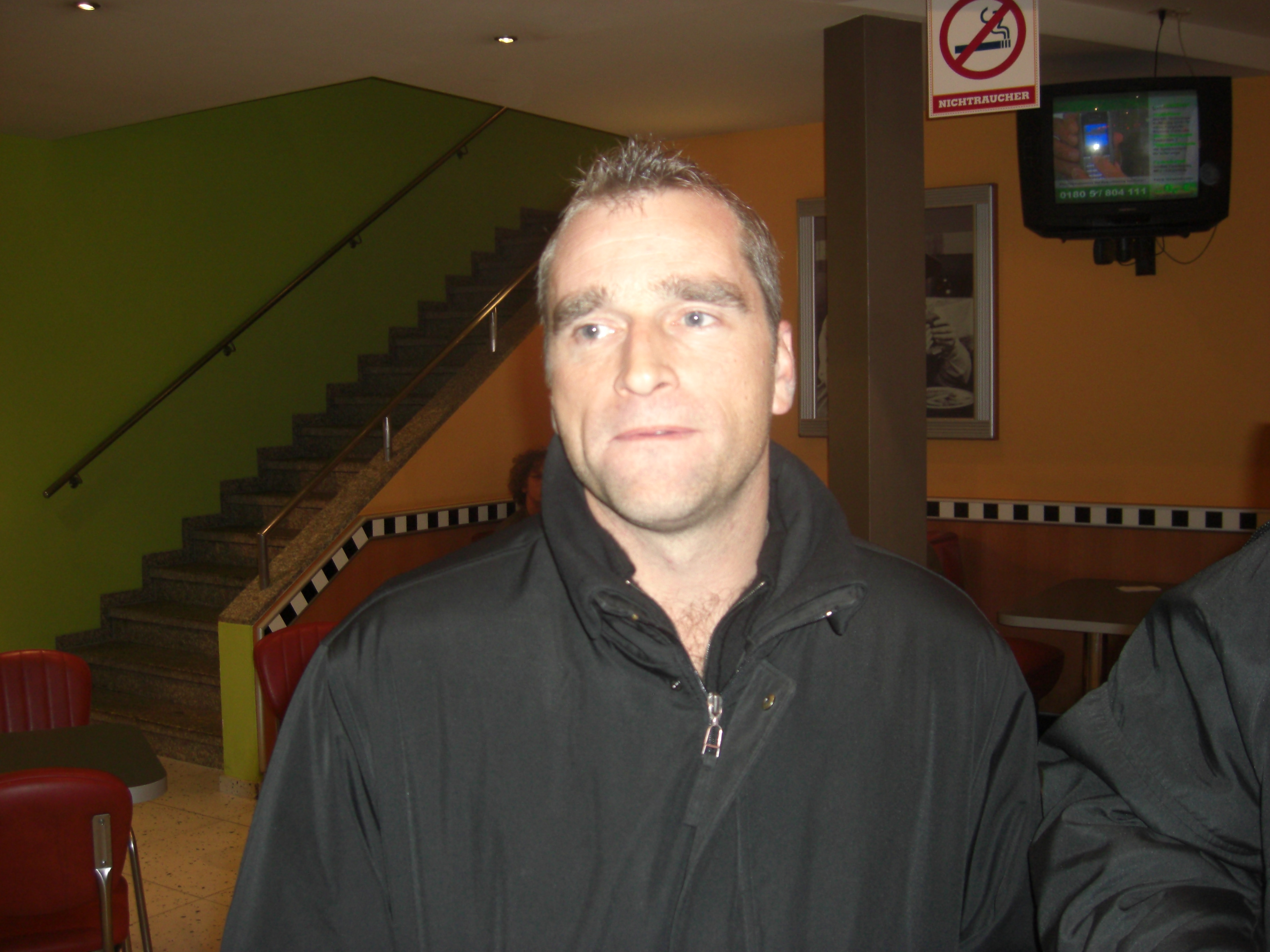

Personal information
- Date of birth: 2 February 1968 (age 58)
- Place of birth: Birstein, West Germany
- Height: 1.80 m (5 ft 11 in)
- Position: Striker

Youth career
- SG Bad Soden
- FSV Bad Orb
- SV Sotzbach

Senior career*
Years	Team	Apps	(Gls)
–1991	SV 1919 Bernbach		
1991–1994	Karlsruher SC	57	(15)
1994–1995	Bayer Uerdingen	31	(3)
1996–1998	Fortuna Köln	69	(27)
1998–2000	Karlsruher SC	66	(34)
2000–2001	1. FC Saarbrücken	26	(4)
2001–2002	Chemnitzer FC	50	(6)
2003–2005	Karlsruher SC II		

Managerial career
- 2005–2009: Karlsruher SC II
- 2009–2011: ASV Durlach
- 2011–2012: 1. CFR Pforzheim
- 2013–2016: FC Nöttingen (assistant)
- * Club domestic league appearances and goals

Rainer Krieg (born 2 February 1968) is a German football coach and a former player.
