= Markus Kurth (footballer) =

German footballer and manager

Personal information
- Date of birth: 30 July 1973 (age 53)
- Place of birth: Neuss, Germany
- Height: 1.80 m (5 ft 11 in)
- Position: Striker

Team information
- Current team: SC Mülheim Nord (Manager)

Youth career
- VfL Benrath
- BV 04 Düsseldorf

Senior career*
Years	Team	Apps	(Gls)
1994–1995	Bayer Leverkusen	2	(0)
1995–1999	1. FC Nürnberg	121	(30)
1999–2003	1. FC Köln	119	(24)
2003–2007	MSV Duisburg	121	(33)
2007–2010	Rot-Weiss Essen	88	(12)
2010–2011	Germania Windeck	24	(8)
Total		475	(131)

Managerial career
- 2011–2013: Viktoria Köln (assistant)
- 2013–2014: SF Baumberg
- 2014–: SC Mülheim Nord
- * Club domestic league appearances and goals

Markus Kurth (born 30 July 1973) is a German football manager and former player. He is the manager of SC Mülheim Nord
