= Ergolding =

- Municipality
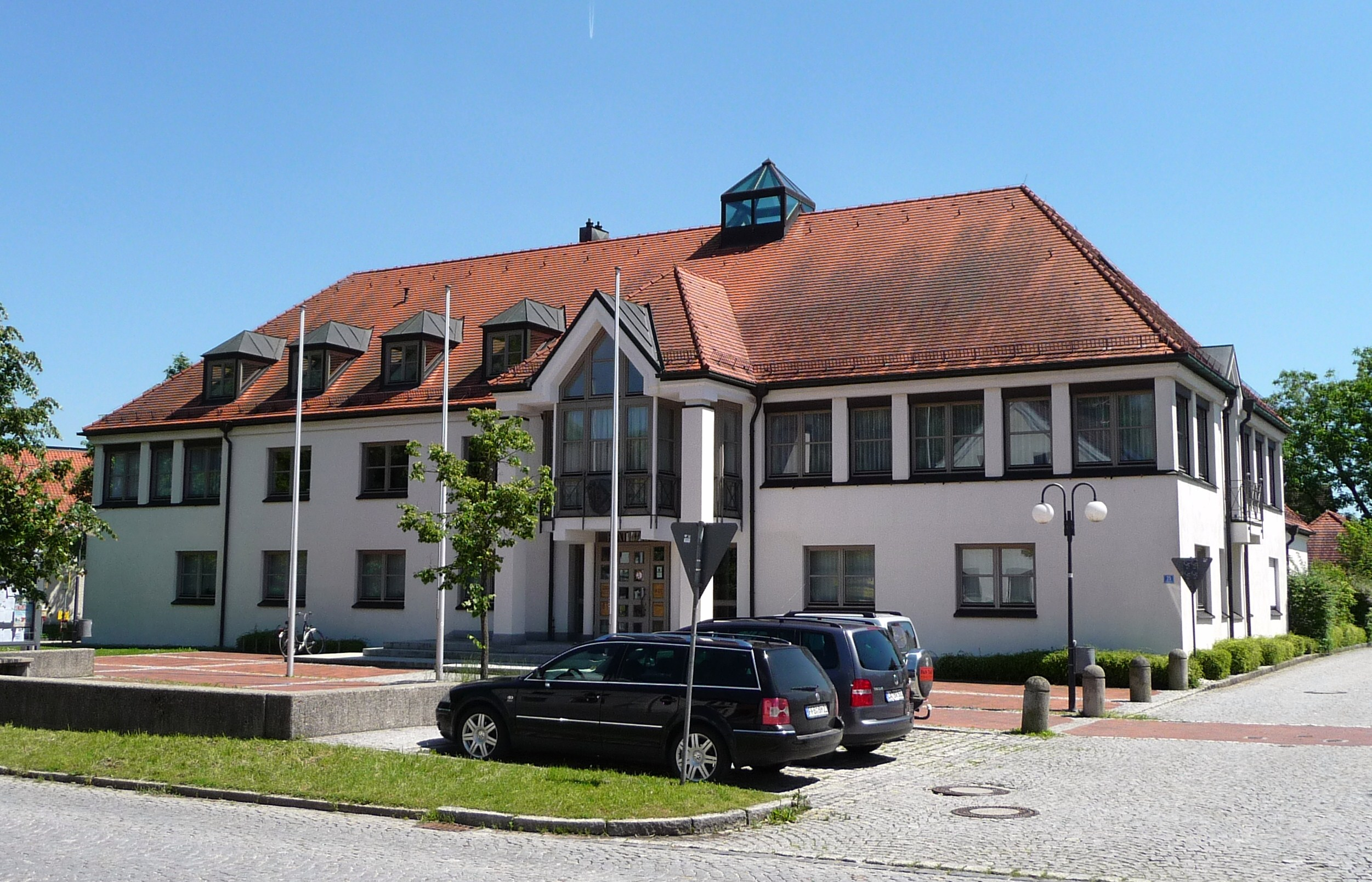
- Town hall

- Coat of arms

- Location of Ergolding within Landshut district
- Interactive map of Ergolding
- Location within Germany Location within Bavaria
- Coordinates: 48°35′N 12°10′E
- Country: Germany
- State: Bavaria
- Admin. region: Niederbayern
- District: Landshut
- Subdivisions: 24 Ortsteile

Government
  - Mayor (2020–26): Andreas Strauß (FW)

Area
  - Total: 37.16 km^{2} (14.35 sq mi)
- Elevation: 392 m (1,286 ft)

Population (2025-12-31)
  - Total: 13,511
  - Density: 363.6/km^{2} (941.7/sq mi)
- Time zone: UTC+01:00 (CET)
  - Summer (DST): UTC+02:00 (CEST)
- Postal codes: 84030
- Dialling codes: 0871
- Vehicle registration: LA
- Website: www.ergolding.de

Ergolding (Central Bavarian: Erwading) is a municipality in the district of Landshut, in Bavaria, Germany. It is situated on the left bank of the Isar, 5 km northeast of Landshut.

== Heraldry ==
| Ergolding | Blazon: Divided per pale argent and azure, in the dexter a rooted green linden tree with seven leaves, in the sinister a silver chevron. |
