= Achim Weber =

German footballer and coach

Personal information
- Date of birth: March 11, 1969 (age 57)
- Height: 1.85 m (6 ft 1 in)
- Position: Striker

Senior career*
Years	Team	Apps	(Gls)
1989–1990	1. FC Wülfrath		
1990–1991	Fortuna Köln	17	(4)
1991–1993	FV Bad Honnef		
1993–1994	VfL Gevelsberg	27	(12)
1994–1996	Wuppertaler SV	61	(27)
1997–1999	Rot-Weiß Oberhausen	94	(49)
1999–2000	VfL Bochum	40	(20)
2001–2002	Rot-Weiß Oberhausen	21	(9)
2002–2004	Rot-Weiss Essen	46	(22)

Managerial career
- 2006–2007: Wuppertaler SV (athletic director)
- 2008: SSVg Velbert
- * Club domestic league appearances and goals

Achim Weber (born March 11, 1969) is a German football coach and a former player.
