= 1999–2000 2. Bundesliga =

26th season of the second-tier football league in Germany

2. Bundesliga
- Season: 1999–2000
- Champions: 1. FC Köln
- Promoted: 1. FC Köln; VfL Bochum; FC Energie Cottbus
- Relegated: Fortuna Köln; Karlsruher SC; Kickers Offenbach; Tennis Borussia Berlin
- Matches played: 306
- Top goalscorer: Tomislav Maric (21 goals)
- Average attendance: 12,208

The 1999–2000 2. Bundesliga season was the twenty-sixth season of the 2. Bundesliga, the second tier of the German football league system.

1. FC Köln, VfL Bochum and FC Energie Cottbus were promoted to the Bundesliga while Tennis Borussia Berlin, Fortuna Köln, Kickers Offenbach and Karlsruher SC were relegated to the Regionalliga. Fortuna Köln had, up till then, played every one of the twenty-six seasons of the 2. Bundesliga since 1974 in the league.

== League table ==
For the 1999–2000 season SV Waldhof Mannheim, Kickers Offenbach, Chemnitzer FC and Alemannia Aachen were newly promoted to the 2. Bundesliga from the Regionalliga while 1. FC Nürnberg, VfL Bochum and Borussia Mönchengladbach had been relegated to the league from the Bundesliga.

Locations of the participating teams of the 1999–2000 season

Pos	Team	Pld	W	D	L	GF	GA	GD	Pts	Promotion or relegation
1	1. FC Köln (C, P)	34	19	8	7	68	39	+29	65	Promotion to Bundesliga
2	VfL Bochum (P)	34	18	7	9	67	48	+19	61	Promotion to Bundesliga
3	Energie Cottbus (P)	34	18	4	12	62	42	+20	58	Promotion to Bundesliga
4	1. FC Nürnberg	34	15	10	9	54	46	+8	55	
5	Borussia Mönchengladbach	34	14	12	8	60	43	+17	54	
6	Rot-Weiß Oberhausen	34	12	13	9	43	34	+9	49	
7	SpVgg Greuther Fürth	34	10	16	8	40	39	+1	46	
8	Alemannia Aachen	34	12	10	12	46	54	−8	46	
9	Mainz 05	34	11	12	11	41	42	−1	45	
10	Hannover 96	34	12	8	14	56	56	0	44	
11	Chemnitzer FC	34	11	10	13	42	49	−7	43	
12	Waldhof Mannheim	34	10	12	12	50	59	−9	42	
13	FC St. Pauli	34	8	15	11	37	45	−8	39	
14	Stuttgarter Kickers	34	10	9	15	49	58	−9	39	
15	Fortuna Köln (R)	34	8	11	15	38	50	−12	35	Relegation to Regionalliga (Note: Fortuna Köln and Tennis Borussia Berlin were relegated to the Regionalliga Nord. Karlsruher SC and Kickers Offenbach were relegated to the Regionalliga Süd.)
16	Kickers Offenbach (R)	34	8	11	15	35	58	−23	35	Relegation to Regionalliga
17	Karlsruher SC (R)	34	5	12	17	35	56	−21	27	Relegation to Regionalliga
18	Tennis Borussia Berlin (Note: Tennis Borussia Berlin had their license revoked. Under paragraph 41 of the DFB regulations, Tennis Borussia Berlin were placed last.) (R)	34	10	10	14	42	50	−8	40	Relegation to Regionalliga

Source: Bundesliga.de
Rules for classification: 1) points; 2) goal difference; 3) number of goals scored.
(C) Champions; (P) Promoted; (R) Relegated

== Results ==
Home \ Away	AAC	TBB	BOC	CFC	FCE	SGF	H96	KSC	KOE	FKO	M05	WMA	BMG	FCN	RWO	KOF	STP	SKI
Alemannia Aachen	—	2–2	0–1	0–1	1–0	2–2	1–2	4–1	1–2	1–1	1–0	2–1	1–1	3–1	0–0	2–1	3–1	4–1
Tennis Borussia Berlin	1–2	—	0–4	0–0	1–3	3–1	2–1	2–2	2–0	1–2	2–1	3–1	2–2	1–3	1–0	0–0	2–0	2–0
VfL Bochum	5–0	2–6	—	5–1	2–4	1–2	2–1	2–1	2–3	3–0	0–1	2–0	2–2	2–1	1–0	6–1	2–0	2–1
Chemnitzer FC	2–2	1–0	3–3	—	1–2	5–0	2–1	3–1	1–3	2–1	1–1	0–0	2–0	1–1	1–1	3–0	1–3	1–1
Energie Cottbus	4–1	2–0	1–1	2–4	—	4–2	1–0	3–2	2–0	2–0	3–0	3–2	2–2	2–0	0–1	5–0	3–2	1–0
Greuther Fürth	1–1	2–0	2–2	0–1	1–0	—	0–0	2–0	0–0	0–0	2–0	0–0	1–1	1–1	0–1	1–1	0–0	0–0
Hannover 96	3–1	2–3	3–3	2–0	3–2	1–2	—	1–1	3–5	3–1	2–1	2–2	2–3	2–0	1–1	1–1	1–2	2–1
Karlsruher SC	0–0	0–0	1–3	1–2	1–0	0–1	1–3	—	0–0	2–1	1–2	1–1	3–0	0–1	0–3	1–1	0–0	1–1
1. FC Köln	4–0	1–1	3–0	2–1	4–1	2–2	3–1	1–2	—	3–0	1–0	3–0	1–1	6–1	1–0	1–1	6–3	4–1
Fortuna Köln	0–0	0–0	2–3	1–0	2–0	0–1	1–1	2–3	4–1	—	2–1	1–5	1–2	1–1	0–0	4–1	2–0	1–1
Mainz 05	4–2	2–1	0–1	5–0	1–0	1–0	1–0	2–2	0–0	0–0	—	2–0	0–0	1–1	1–1	1–1	1–1	2–0
Waldhof Mannheim	1–1	0–0	4–2	4–0	2–1	3–3	2–2	1–1	2–1	1–3	2–1	—	2–1	2–1	2–0	2–3	1–3	4–3
Borussia Mönchengladbach	1–2	4–2	0–1	1–0	2–2	2–0	2–3	4–1	3–1	0–0	6–1	2–0	—	4–0	4–2	1–0	2–1	1–1
1. FC Nürnberg	3–1	2–0	0–1	1–0	1–1	2–2	5–1	4–3	1–1	2–1	2–0	3–0	2–1	—	2–1	1–1	2–2	3–2
Rot-Weiß Oberhausen	3–0	3–0	3–0	1–0	0–4	3–4	2–1	0–0	1–0	4–0	0–0	1–1	1–1	1–0	—	1–0	2–2	2–2
Kickers Offenbach	1–2	2–1	2–1	2–0	1–2	1–0	0–2	1–0	0–1	4–3	2–2	1–1	1–1	1–3	2–1	—	0–1	0–4
FC St. Pauli	2–1	1–1	0–0	0–0	1–0	0–0	0–2	3–1	1–2	0–0	2–2	1–1	0–2	0–0	1–1	1–1	—	2–1
Stuttgarter Kickers	1–2	2–0	0–0	2–2	1–0	1–5	2–1	2–1	1–2	2–1	3–4	3–0	3–1	0–3	2–2	2–1	2–1	—

Source: DFB
Legend: Blue = home team win; Yellow = draw; Red = away team win.

== Top scorers ==
The league's top scorers:

Goals	Player	Team
21	(Croatia) Tomislav Marić	Stuttgarter Kickers
19	(Netherlands) Arie van Lent	Borussia Mönchengladbach
19	(Germany) Achim Weber	VfL Bochum
15	(Germany) Rainer Krieg	Karlsruher SC
15	(Croatia) Antun Labak	FC Energie Cottbus
15	(Germany) Peter Peschel	VfL Bochum
14	(Bulgaria) Dimtcho Beliakov	1. FC Nürnberg
14	(North Macedonia) Saša Ćirić	Tennis Borussia Berlin
14	(Germany) Dirk Lottner	1. FC Köln
13	(Germany) Gustav Policella	1. FSV Mainz 05
13	(Germany) Angelo Vier	Rot-Weiß Oberhausen
