= 2000–01 Bundesliga =

38th season of the Bundesliga

Bundesliga
- Season: 2000–01
- Dates: 11 August 2000 – 19 May 2001
- Champions: Bayern Munich; 16th Bundesliga title 17th German title
- Relegated: Unterhaching; Frankfurt; Bochum
- Champions League: Bayern Munich; Schalke 04; Borussia Dortmund; Bayer Leverkusen
- UEFA Cup: Hertha BSC; Freiburg
- Intertoto Cup: Werder Bremen; Wolfsburg; 1860 Munich
- Matches: 306
- Goals: 897 (2.93 per match)
- Top goalscorer: Sergej Barbarez (22); Ebbe Sand (22)
- Biggest home win: Wolfsburg 6–0 Köln (21 October 2000)
- Biggest away win: seven matches with a differential of −4 each (1–5 once, 0–4 six times)
- Highest scoring: Wolfsburg 4–4 Hamburg (23 September 2000); Bayern Munich 6–2 Dortmund (4 November 2000); Schalke 5–3 Unterhaching (19 May 2001) (8 goals each)

The 2000–01 Bundesliga was the 38th season of the Bundesliga, Germany's premier football league. It began on 11 August 2000 and ended on 19 May 2001. Bayern Munich successfully defended their title after a last-minute Patrik Andersson goal denied Schalke 04 their first title.

== Competition modus ==
Every team played two games against each other team, one at home and one away. Teams received three points for a win and one point for a draw. If two or more teams were tied on points, places were determined by goal difference and, if still tied, by goals scored. The team with the most points were crowned champions while the three teams with the fewest points were relegated to 2. Bundesliga.

== Team changes to 1999–2000 ==
SSV Ulm, Arminia Bielefeld and MSV Duisburg were relegated to the 2. Bundesliga after finishing in the last three places. They were replaced by 1. FC Köln, VfL Bochum and Energie Cottbus.

== Season overview ==
=== Title race ===
The 2000–01 season was notable for its title race, which literally lasted until the last seconds of the campaign. Before the last round of matches, Bayern Munich lead Schalke 04 by three points, but with an inferior goal difference. Schalke managed to defeat Unterhaching, 5–3. Shortly before this match ended, Bayern gave up a 90th-minute goal against Hamburg. As the news spread quickly at the Parkstadion, most Schalke supporters believed their team had won their first championship since 1958. The pitch had thus already been stormed in celebration although the match in Hamburg was not concluded yet, which could also be seen on stadium television.

In Hamburg, Bayern tried one last attack in injury time when suddenly Hamburg goalkeeper Mathias Schober, who ironically was loaned out from Schalke, stopped a back pass by his teammate Tomáš Ujfaluši with his hands. Referee Markus Merk thus awarded an indirect free kick for Bayern about eight meters from the Hamburg goal. Discussions and protests led to a further delay before Patrik Andersson eventually scored the decisive equaliser, the only goal of his Bayern career, on a Stefan Effenberg tip pass. The match was never resumed afterwards.

In Schalke, the atmosphere immediately turned from joy and celebration to shock, disbelief and mourning. Because of the events, the Schalke 04 team of that season was dubbed "Champion of Hearts" by the German media.

=== Other events ===
Title combatants Bayern and Schalke both qualified for the 2001–02 UEFA Champions League while Borussia Dortmund and Bayer Leverkusen achieved qualification round spots for the same competition. Hertha BSC and SC Freiburg ended their season with successful qualification for the 2001–02 UEFA Cup. European qualification was rounded out by Werder Bremen, VfL Wolfsburg and 1860 Munich, who entered the 2001 UEFA Intertoto Cup.

The 2000–01 DFB-Pokal was won by Schalke 04. As a consequence to Schalke's Champions League qualification, the UEFA Cup spot reserved for the domestic cup winner was awarded to finalists Union Berlin, who played in the third-tier Regionalliga Nordost.

On the bottom end of the table, SpVgg Unterhaching, Eintracht Frankfurt and VfL Bochum had to face relegation to the 2. Bundesliga. Promoted for the new season were 2000–01 2. Bundesliga champions 1. FC Nürnberg, runners-up Borussia Mönchengladbach and third-placed FC St. Pauli.

In European competitions, Bayern Munich won the 2000–01 Champions League after beating Spanish sides Valencia on penalties. Aside from that, it was a rather meagre year for German teams. Hamburg and Leverkusen both exited Champions League at the first group stage, 1860 Munich even did not make the group stage at all by losing in the third qualifying round against Leeds United. All three teams were eventually moved over to the 2000–01 UEFA Cup, but neither of them advanced past the third round. From the "regular" UEFA Cup participants, Werder Bremen and Hertha BSC also exited in the third round, with Stuttgart following one round later. Only Kaiserslautern made it to the UEFA Cup semi-finals, but had no chance against another Spanish team, Alavés.

== Team overview ==
Location of teams in Bundesliga 2000–01

Club	Location	Ground	Capacity
Hertha BSC	Berlin	Olympiastadion	76,000
VfL Bochum*	Bochum	Ruhrstadion	36,000
Werder Bremen	Bremen	Weserstadion	36,000
Energie Cottbus*	Cottbus	Stadion der Freundschaft	21,000
Borussia Dortmund	Dortmund	Westfalenstadion	68,600
Eintracht Frankfurt	Frankfurt am Main	Waldstadion	62,000
SC Freiburg	Freiburg im Breisgau	Dreisamstadion	25,000
Hamburger SV	Hamburg	Volksparkstadion	62,000
1. FC Kaiserslautern	Kaiserslautern	Fritz-Walter-Stadion	41,500
1. FC Köln*	Cologne	Müngersdorfer Stadion	46,000
Bayer Leverkusen	Leverkusen	BayArena	22,500
1860 Munich	Munich	Olympiastadion	63,000
Bayern Munich	Munich	Olympiastadion	63,000
Hansa Rostock	Rostock	Ostseestadion	25,850
Schalke 04	Gelsenkirchen	Parkstadion	70,000
VfB Stuttgart	Stuttgart	Gottlieb-Daimler-Stadion	53,700
SpVgg Unterhaching	Unterhaching	Stadion am Sportpark	11,300
VfL Wolfsburg	Wolfsburg	VfL-Stadion am Elsterweg	21,600

(*) Promoted from 2. Bundesliga.

== League table ==
Pos	Team	Pld	W	D	L	GF	GA	GD	Pts	Qualification or relegation
1	Bayern Munich (C)	34	19	6	9	62	37	+25	63	Qualification to Champions League group stage
2	Schalke 04	34	18	8	8	65	35	+30	62	Qualification to Champions League group stage
3	Borussia Dortmund	34	16	10	8	62	42	+20	58	Qualification to Champions League third qualifying round
4	Bayer Leverkusen	34	17	6	11	54	40	+14	57	Qualification to Champions League third qualifying round
5	Hertha BSC	34	18	2	14	58	52	+6	56	Qualification to UEFA Cup first round
6	SC Freiburg	34	15	10	9	54	37	+17	55	Qualification to UEFA Cup first round
7	Werder Bremen	34	15	8	11	53	48	+5	53	Qualification to Intertoto Cup third round
8	1. FC Kaiserslautern	34	15	5	14	49	54	−5	50	
9	VfL Wolfsburg	34	12	11	11	60	45	+15	47	Qualification to Intertoto Cup third round
10	1. FC Köln	34	12	10	12	59	52	+7	46	
11	1860 Munich	34	12	8	14	43	55	−12	44	Qualification to Intertoto Cup second round
12	Hansa Rostock	34	12	7	15	34	47	−13	43	
13	Hamburger SV	34	10	11	13	58	58	0	41	
14	Energie Cottbus	34	12	3	19	38	52	−14	39	
15	VfB Stuttgart	34	9	11	14	42	49	−7	38	
16	SpVgg Unterhaching (R)	34	8	11	15	35	59	−24	35	Relegation to 2. Bundesliga
17	Eintracht Frankfurt (R)	34	10	5	19	41	68	−27	35	Relegation to 2. Bundesliga
18	VfL Bochum (R)	34	7	6	21	30	67	−37	27	Relegation to 2. Bundesliga

Source: www.dfb.de
Rules for classification: 1) points; 2) goal difference; 3) number of goals scored.
(C) Champions; (R) Relegated

== Results ==
Home \ Away	BSC	BOC	SVW	FCE	BVB	SGE	SCF	HSV	FCK	KOE	B04	M60	FCB	ROS	S04	VFB	UNT	WOB
Hertha BSC	—	4–0	4–1	3–1	1–0	3–0	2–2	4–0	2–4	4–2	1–1	3–0	1–3	1–0	0–4	2–0	2–1	1–3
VfL Bochum	1–3	—	1–2	1–0	1–1	2–1	1–3	0–4	0–1	2–3	3–2	1–1	0–3	1–2	1–1	0–0	3–0	2–1
Werder Bremen	3–1	2–0	—	3–1	1–2	1–1	3–1	3–1	1–2	2–1	3–3	2–0	1–1	3–0	2–1	1–0	0–0	2–3
Energie Cottbus	3–0	2–0	3–1	—	1–4	2–0	0–2	4–2	0–2	0–2	1–2	2–3	1–0	1–0	4–1	2–1	1–0	0–0
Borussia Dortmund	2–0	5–0	0–0	2–0	—	6–1	1–0	4–2	1–2	3–3	1–3	2–3	1–1	1–0	0–4	0–0	3–0	2–1
Eintracht Frankfurt	0–4	3–0	1–2	1–0	1–1	—	3–0	1–1	3–1	1–5	1–3	1–0	0–2	4–0	0–0	2–1	3–0	1–2
SC Freiburg	1–0	5–0	0–1	4–1	2–2	5–2	—	0–0	5–2	0–0	0–1	0–3	1–1	0–0	3–1	4–0	2–0	4–1
Hamburger SV	1–2	3–0	2–1	2–1	2–3	2–0	5–0	—	1–1	1–1	1–3	2–2	1–1	2–1	2–0	2–2	1–1	3–2
1. FC Kaiserslautern	0–1	0–1	2–0	1–1	1–4	4–2	0–2	2–1	—	3–1	0–1	3–2	0–0	0–1	3–2	1–0	4–0	0–0
1. FC Köln	1–0	2–0	1–3	4–0	0–0	4–1	0–1	4–2	0–1	—	1–1	4–0	1–2	5–2	2–2	3–2	1–1	0–0
Bayer Leverkusen	4–0	1–0	3–0	1–3	2–0	1–0	1–3	1–1	4–2	4–1	—	0–0	0–1	1–2	0–3	4–0	1–0	2–0
1860 Munich	0–1	2–4	2–1	0–1	1–0	2–2	3–1	2–1	0–4	3–1	1–0	—	0–2	2–1	1–1	2–1	0–2	2–2
Bayern Munich	4–1	3–2	2–3	2–0	6–2	1–2	1–0	2–1	2–1	1–1	2–0	3–1	—	0–1	1–3	1–0	3–1	3–1
Hansa Rostock	0–2	2–0	5–2	1–0	1–2	0–2	0–0	1–0	1–0	2–1	2–1	0–0	3–2	—	0–4	1–1	2–2	1–1
Schalke 04	3–1	2–1	1–1	3–0	0–0	4–0	0–0	0–1	5–1	2–1	0–0	2–0	3–2	2–0	—	2–1	5–3	2–1
VfB Stuttgart	0–1	1–1	2–1	1–0	0–2	4–1	0–0	3–3	6–1	0–3	4–1	2–2	2–1	1–0	1–0	—	2–2	2–1
SpVgg Unterhaching	5–2	2–1	0–0	2–1	1–4	2–0	1–1	2–1	0–0	0–0	1–2	3–2	1–0	1–1	0–2	0–0	—	0–3
VfL Wolfsburg	2–1	0–0	1–1	1–1	1–1	3–0	1–2	4–4	4–0	6–0	2–0	0–1	1–3	2–1	2–0	2–2	6–1	—

Source: DFB
Legend: Blue = home team win; Yellow = draw; Red = away team win.

== Top goalscorers ==
Rank	Player	Club	Goals
1	(Bosnia and Herzegovina) Sergej Barbarez	Hamburger SV	22
1	(Denmark) Ebbe Sand	Schalke 04	22
3	(Peru) Claudio Pizarro	Werder Bremen	19
4	(Germany) Michael Preetz	Hertha BSC	16
5	(Brazil) Giovane Élber	Bayern Munich	15
5	(Germany) Oliver Neuville	Bayer Leverkusen	15
7	(Brazil) Ailton	Werder Bremen	14
8	(Belgium) Émile Mpenza	Schalke 04	13
9	(Australia) Paul Agostino	1860 Munich	12
9	(Germany) Carsten Jancker	Bayern Munich	12
9	(Poland) Andrzej Juskowiak	VfL Wolfsburg	12
9	(Germany) Ulf Kirsten	Bayer Leverkusen	12

== Awards ==
=== Annual awards ===
Award	Winner	Club
Footballer of the Year	(Germany) Oliver Kahn	Bayern Munich
Top Scorer	(Bosnia and Herzegovina) Sergej Barbarez (Denmark) Ebbe Sand	Hamburger SV; Schalke 04
Manager of the Year	(Germany) Ottmar Hitzfeld	Bayern Munich

kicker Team of the Season
Goalkeeper	(Germany) Frank Rost (Werder Bremen)			
Defenders	(Brazil) Lúcio (Bayer Leverkusen)		(Germany) Jens Nowotny (Bayer Leverkusen)	(Germany) Jürgen Kohler (Borussia Dortmund)
Midfielders	(Germany) Andreas Möller (Borussia Dortmund)	(Germany) Mehmet Scholl (Bayern Munich)	(Germany) Dirk Lottner (1. FC Köln)	(Germany) Sebastian Kehl (Freiburg)
Forwards	(Bosnia and Herzegovina) Sergej Barbarez (Hamburg)		(Denmark) Ebbe Sand (Schalke 04)	(Peru) Claudio Pizarro (Werder Bremen)

== Attendances ==
Rank	Team	Home games	Average attendance
1	Borussia Dortmund	17	63,729
2	Bayern Munich	17	49,706
3	Schalke 04	17	46,599
4	Hamburger SV	17	42,995
5	Hertha BSC	17	40,455
6	1. FC Kaiserslautern	17	39,246
7	1. FC Köln	17	34,339
8	Werder Bremen	17	30,341
9	Eintracht Frankfurt	17	29,494
10	1860 München	17	28,012
11	VfB Stuttgart	17	26,610
12	SC Freiburg	17	24,882
13	Bayer Leverkusen	17	22,412
14	VfL Bochum	17	19,600
15	Energie Cottbus	17	16,833
16	VfL Wolfsburg	17	15,501
17	Hansa Rostock	17	15,071
18	SpVgg Unterhaching	17	10,771
