= 1995–96 VfL Bochum season =

VfL Bochum
1995–96 season
- President: Werner Altegoer
- Head Coach: Klaus Toppmöller
- Stadium: Ruhrstadion
- 2. Bundesliga: 1st (promoted)
- DFB-Pokal: First Round
- Top goalscorer: League: Közle, Peschel (both 11); All: Közle, Peschel (both 11)
- Highest home attendance: 25,183 (vs Arminia Bielefeld, 2 June 1996)
- Lowest home attendance: 10,574 (vs SpVgg Unterhaching, 30 October 1995)
- Average home league attendance: 15,571
Home colours	Away colours	Third colours

The 1995–96 VfL Bochum season was the 58th season in club history.

== Review and events ==
The 1995–96 season was the first season in German football where teams received three points for a win (instead of two), and one point for a draw. Due to the German Football Association lifting the requirement of starting squads wearing jerseys with the numbers one to eleven, it was the first season for the VfL Bochum to assign numbers to its players and feature the players' names on their jerseys.

== Matches ==
=== Legend ===
Win Draw Loss

=== 2. Bundesliga ===
4 August 1995 1	MSV Duisburg	0 – 0	VfL Bochum	Duisburg
20:15				Stadium: Wedaustadion; Attendance: 16,000; Referee: Günther Habermann (Weißensee)

9 August 1995 2	VfL Bochum	3 – 1	SV Waldhof Mannheim	Bochum
20:00	Peschel 25'; Wohlfarth 45', 57'		Akpoborie 90'	Stadium: Ruhrstadion; Attendance: 15,014; Referee: Alfons Berg (Konz)

14 August 1995 3	VfL Bochum	1 – 0	Hannover 96	Bochum
20:15	Michalke 18'			Stadium: Ruhrstadion; Attendance: 13,011; Referee: Winfried Buchhart (Schrobenhausen)

20 August 1995 4	VfB Lübeck	3 – 0	VfL Bochum	Lübeck
15:00	Jurgeleit 21', 27' van der Steen 59'			Stadium: Stadion an der Lohmühle; Attendance: 17,500; Referee: Günther Frey (Neu-Ulm)

29 August 1995 5	VfL Bochum	3 – 0	VfB Leipzig	Bochum
20:00	Wosz 11'; Bałuszyński 85'; Wohlfarth 90'			Stadium: Ruhrstadion; Attendance: 11,121; Referee: Thomas Rüdiger (Bad Salzdetfurth)

26 September 1995 6	FSV Zwickau	2 – 1	VfL Bochum	Zwickau
15:30	Mencel 38'; Günther 75'		Kracht 32'	Stadium: Westsachsenstadion; Attendance: 2,739; Referee: Ralf Hilmes (Nordhorn)

8 September 1995 7	VfL Bochum	4 – 1	SV Meppen	Bochum
20:00	Peschel 28'; Közle 45', 75'; Bałuszyński 57'		Thoben 86'	Stadium: Ruhrstadion; Attendance: 13,696; Referee: Holger Dehmelt (Sabachwalden)

16 September 1995 8	Hertha BSC	0 – 2	VfL Bochum	Berlin
15:30			Wohlfarth 84', 89'	Stadium: Olympiastadion; Attendance: 14,292; Referee: Jörg Friedrichs (Ilvesheim)

22 September 1995 9	VfL Bochum	4 – 0	1. FC Nürnberg	Bochum
20:00	Peschel 9'; Bałuszyński 25'; Michalke 33'; Közle 35'			Stadium: Ruhrstadion; Attendance: 18,170; Referee: Bernd Hauer (Celle)

30 September 1995 10	SC Fortuna Köln	0 – 2	VfL Bochum	Cologne
15:30			Bałuszyński 64'; Stickroth 88'	Stadium: Südstadion; Attendance: 4,500; Referee: Jörg Keßler (Höhenkirchen)

15 October 1995 11	VfL Bochum	2 – 2	SG Wattenscheid 09	Bochum
17:30	Kracht 14'; Michalke 85'		Sobiech 61'; Reina 74'	Stadium: Ruhrstadion; Attendance: 24,700; Referee: Herbert Fandel (Kyllburg)

21 October 1995 12	VfL Wolfsburg	0 – 5	VfL Bochum	Wolfsburg
15:00			Bałuszyński 1', 62'; Kracht 29'; Michalke 61'; Wohlfarth 90'	Stadium: VfL-Stadion am Elsterweg; Attendance: 4,200; Referee: Norbert Dörr (Griesheim)

30 October 1995 13	VfL Bochum	3 – 1	SpVgg Unterhaching	Bochum
20:15	Közle 28'; Peschel 36', 49'		Oberleitner 7'	Stadium: Ruhrstadion; Attendance: 10,574; Referee: Michael Malbranc (Hamburg)

3 November 1995 14	FC Carl Zeiss Jena	0 – 4	VfL Bochum	Jena
19:30			Michalke 13', 84'; Peschel 69'; Wałdoch 77'	Stadium: Ernst-Abbe-Sportfeld; Attendance: 5,416; Referee: Hans-Jürgen Kasper (Katlenburg)

10 November 1995 15	VfL Bochum	2 – 2	Chemnitzer FC	Bochum
20:00	Közle 57', 66'		Meißner 62', 79'	Stadium: Ruhrstadion; Attendance: 14,683; Referee: Thomas Leimert (Ludwigshafen)

20 November 1995 16	Arminia Bielefeld	1 – 3	VfL Bochum	Bielefeld
20:15	Walter 61'		Bałuszyński 63'; Gaugler 71'; Wynalda 87'	Stadium: Alm; Attendance: 18,000; Referee: Alfons Berg (Konz)

24 November 1995 17	VfL Bochum	3 – 0	1. FSV Mainz 05	Bochum
20:00	Bałuszyński 29'; Közle 34'; Wynalda 76'			Stadium: Ruhrstadion; Attendance: 14,342; Referee: Jörg Hotop (Cologne)

4 December 1995 18	VfL Bochum	0 – 1	MSV Duisburg	Bochum
20:15			Wohlert 10'	Stadium: Ruhrstadion; Attendance: 17,136; Referee: Markus Merk (Otterbach)

10 December 1995 19	SV Waldhof Mannheim	1 – 0	VfL Bochum	Mannheim
15:00	Akpoborie 28'			Stadium: Carl-Benz-Stadion; Attendance: 7,000; Referee: Jörg Keßler (Höhenkirchen-Siegertsbrunn)

9 March 1996 20	Hannover 96	0 – 2	VfL Bochum	Hannover
15:30	Daschner 32'; Borodyuk 50'			Stadium: Niedersachsenstadion; Attendance: 12,135; Referee: Helmut Fleischer (Ulm)

17 March 1996 21	VfL Bochum	3 – 1	VfB Lübeck	Bochum
15:00	Wałdoch 15'; Behnert 23' (o.g.); Wosz 68'		Hempel 50'	Stadium: Ruhrstadion; Attendance: 15,155; Referee: Detlef Schütz (Norken)

23 March 1996 22	VfB Leipzig	0 – 1	VfL Bochum	Leipzig
15:30			Peschel 80'	Stadium: Bruno-Plache-Stadion; Attendance: 6,900; Referee: Franz-Xaver Wack (Biberbach)

1 April 1996 23	VfL Bochum	3 – 0	FSV Zwickau	Bochum
19:30	Közle 10', 11'; Peschel 57'			Stadium: Ruhrstadion; Attendance: 11,385; Referee: Bernhard Zerr (Ottersweier)

7 April 1996 24	SV Meppen	2 – 3	VfL Bochum	Meppen
15:00	Vorholt 24' (pen.); Lau 35'		Kracht 47'; Stickroth 58' (pen.); Reis 59'	Stadium: Emslandstadion; Attendance: 12,000; Referee: Peter Müller (Dresden)

12 April 1996 25	VfL Bochum	2 – 2	Hertha BSC	Bochum
20:00	Közle 70'; Rudy 81'		Kovač 2'; Arnold 22'	Stadium: Ruhrstadion; Attendance: 18,150; Referee: Herbert Fandel (Kyllburg)

21 April 1996 26	1. FC Nürnberg	0 – 1	VfL Bochum	Nuremberg
15:00			Guðjónsson 85'	Stadium: Frankenstadion; Attendance: 22,000; Referee: Lutz Wagner (Kriftel)

28 April 1996 27	VfL Bochum	3 – 1	SC Fortuna Köln	Bochum
15:00	Jack 40'; Guðjónsson 64'; Stickroth 84' (pen.)		Akonnor 55'	Stadium: Ruhrstadion; Attendance: 14,631; Referee: Ralf Hilmes (Nordhorn)

6 May 1996 28	SG Wattenscheid 09	1 – 3	VfL Bochum	Bochum
19:25	Groeleken 63'		Michalke 26'; Közle 43'; Peschel 47'	Stadium: Lohrheidestadion; Attendance: 7,938; Referee: Torsten Koop (Lüttenmark)

10 May 1996 29	VfL Bochum	0 – 0	VfL Wolfsburg	Bochum
20:00				Stadium: Ruhrstadion; Attendance: 16,642; Referee: Frank Fleske (Eisenhüttenstadt)

16 May 1996 30	SpVgg Unterhaching	4 – 2	VfL Bochum	Unterhaching
17:00	Garcia 10', 43'; Radlspeck 56'; Schmöller 79'		Peschel 22'; Guðjónsson 60'	Stadium: Sportpark; Attendance: 5,000; Referee: Günther Habermann (Weißensee)

19 May 1996 31	VfL Bochum	1 – 1	FC Carl Zeiss Jena	Bochum
15:00	Kracht 8'		Holetschek 3'	Stadium: Ruhrstadion; Attendance: 11,112; Referee: Volker Wezel (Tübingen)

24 May 1996 32	Chemnitzer FC	0 – 2	VfL Bochum	Chemnitz
19:00			Wosz 65'; Michalke 80'	Stadium: Sportforum Chemnitz; Attendance: 3,700; Referee: Hans-Peter Best (Kämpfelbach)

2 June 1996 33	VfL Bochum	2 – 0	Arminia Bielefeld	Bochum
15:00	Wohlfarth 83'; Peschel 88'			Stadium: Ruhrstadion; Attendance: 25,183; Referee: Hans Scheuerer (Munich)

8 June 1996 34	1. FSV Mainz 05	1 – 0	VfL Bochum	Mainz
15:30	Weißhaupt 7'			Stadium: Bruchwegstadion; Attendance: 12,000; Referee: Hartmut Strampe (Handorf)

=== DFB-Pokal ===
26 August 1995 R1	FC Sachsen Leipzig	2 – 1	VfL Bochum	Leipzig
15:30	Leitzke 3'; Gräfe 29'		Wohlfarth 63'	Stadium: Alfred-Kunze-Sportpark; Attendance: 4,017; Referee: Helmut Fleischer (Ulm)

== Squad ==
=== Squad and statistics ===
==== Squad, appearances and goals scored ====
No.	Pos	Nat	Player	Total		2. Bundesliga		DFB-Pokal	
No.	Pos	Nat	Player	Apps	Goals	Apps	Goals	Apps	Goals
1	GK	(Germany) GER	Uwe Gospodarek	34	0	33	0	1	0
2	DF	(Germany) GER	Thomas Stickroth	33	3	32	3	1	0
3	DF	(Germany) GER	Torsten Kracht	33	5	33	5	0	0
4	DF	(Germany) GER	Max Eberl	6	0	5	0	1	0
5	DF	(Poland) POL	Tomasz Wałdoch	26	2	25	2	1	0
6	MF	(Germany) GER	Peter Közle	34	11	33	11	1	0
7	MF	(Germany) GER	Kai Michalke	33	8	32	8	1	0
8	MF	(Germany) GER	Peter Peschel	32	11	31	11	1	0
9	FW	(Poland) POL	Henryk Bałuszyński	29	8	28	8	1	0
10	MF	(Germany) GER	Dariusz Wosz	32	3	31	3	1	0
11	FW	(United States) USA	Eric Wynalda (until 31 December 1995)	7	2	7	2	0	0
12	DF	(Germany) GER	Christian Herrmann	16	0	16	0	0	0
13	FW	(Germany) GER	Yves Gaugler	12	1	11	1	1	0
14	MF	(Iceland) ISL	Þórður Guðjónsson	29	3	28	3	1	0
15	MF	(Germany) GER	Robert Matiebel (until 21 September 1995)	0	0	0	0	0	0
16	MF	(Croatia) CRO	Filip Tapalović	5	0	5	0	0	0
17	MF	(Germany) GER	Frank Heinemann	1	0	1	0	0	0
18	FW	(Germany) GER	Roland Wohlfarth	25	8	24	7	1	1
19	DF	(Germany) GER	Mathias Jack	28	1	27	1	1	0
20	GK	(Germany) GER	Ralf Zumdick	0	0	0	0	0	0
21	GK	(Germany) GER	Thomas Ernst	1	0	1	0	0	0
22	DF	(Germany) GER	Thomas Reis	32	1	31	1	1	0
23	FW	(Germany) GER	Holger Aden	0	0	0	0	0	0
24	MF	(Germany) GER	Andreas Wieczorek	3	0	3	0	0	0
26	FW	(South Africa) RSA	Delron Buckley (since 20 September 1995)	3	0	3	0	0	0
27	GK	(Germany) GER	Stefan Wächter	0	0	0	0	0	0
28	MF	(Turkey) TUR	Eyyüp Hasan Uğur (since 1 January 1996)	0	0	0	0	0	0
30	MF	(Poland) POL	Andrzej Rudy (since 10 January 1996)	14	1	14	1	0	0
31	MF	(Germany) GER	Thorsten Schmugge (since 12 January 1996)	8	0	8	0	0	0

=== Transfers ===
==== Summer ====
In:

No.	Pos.	Nation	Player
1	GK	GER	Uwe Gospodarek (from FC Bayern Munich)
2	DF	GER	Thomas Stickroth (from 1. FC Saarbrücken)
3	DF	GER	Torsten Kracht (from VfB Leipzig)
6	MF	GER	Peter Közle (from MSV Duisburg)
16	MF	CRO	Filip Tapalović (from FC Schalke 04 U-19)
19	DF	GER	Mathias Jack (from Rot-Weiss Essen)
21	GK	GER	Thomas Ernst (from FSV Frankfurt)
22	DF	GER	Thomas Reis (from Eintracht Frankfurt)
26	FW	RSA	Delron Buckley (from VfL Bochum II)

Out:

No.	Pos.	Nation	Player
—	DF	GER	Sven Christians (to Wuppertaler SV)
—	MF	POR	Paulo da Palma (to 1. FC Saarbrücken)
—	MF	GER	Dirk Eitzert (retired)
—	MF	GER	Michael Frontzeck (to Borussia Mönchengladbach)
—	DF	GER	Michael Hubner (to SpVgg Erkenschwick)
—	DF	NED	Rob Reekers (to FC Gütersloh)
—	DF	GER	Jörg Schwanke (to 1. FC Union Berlin)
—	DF	GER	Uwe Stöver (to 1. FSV Mainz 05)
—	MF	GER	Markus von Ahlen (to SV Meppen)
—	MF	GER	Uwe Wegmann (to 1. FC Kaiserslautern)
—	GK	GER	Andreas Wessels (to SC Fortuna Köln)

==== Winter ====
In:

No.	Pos.	Nation	Player
27	GK	GER	Stefan Wächter (from VfL Bochum U-19)
28	MF	TUR	Eyyüp Hasan Uğur (from VfL Bochum II)
30	MF	POL	Andrzej Rudy (on loan from 1. FC Köln)
31	MF	GER	Thorsten Schmugge (on loan from 1. FC Saarbrücken)

Out:

No.	Pos.	Nation	Player
