= 1997–98 VfL Bochum season =

VfL Bochum
1997–98 season
- President: Werner Altegoer
- Head Coach: Klaus Toppmöller
- Stadium: Ruhrstadion
- Bundesliga: 12th
- DFB-Pokal: Second round
- DFB-Ligapokal: First round
- UEFA Cup: Third round
- Top goalscorer: League: Peschel (6); All: Peschel, Wosz, Yuran (all 7)
- Highest home attendance: 31,500 (vs FC Schalke 04, 4 April 1998)
- Lowest home attendance: 20,091 (vs VfL Wolfsburg, 20 September 1997)
- Average home league attendance: 26,698
Home colours	Away colours	Third colours

The 1997–98 VfL Bochum season was the 60th season in club history.

== Matches ==
=== Legend ===
Win Draw Loss

=== Bundesliga ===
2 August 1997 1	VfL Bochum	1 – 0	Arminia Bielefeld	Bochum
15:30	Wosz 80'			Stadium: Ruhrstadion; Attendance: 28,349; Referee: Bernhard Zerr (Ottersweier)

5 August 1997 2	Bayer 04 Leverkusen	3 – 2	VfL Bochum	Leverkusen
20:00	Kirsten 60'; Meijer 69'; Ramelow 84'		Yuran 37'; Dickhaut 83'	Stadium: Ulrich-Haberland-Stadion; Attendance: 22,000; Referee: Hermann Albrecht (Kaufbeuren)

8 August 1997 3	VfL Bochum	0 – 0	MSV Duisburg	Bochum
20:00				Stadium: Ruhrstadion; Attendance: 27,005; Referee: Lutz Michael Fröhlich (Berlin)

23 August 1997 4	Borussia Dortmund	5 – 2	VfL Bochum	Dortmund
15:30	Heinrich 7'; Herrlich 25'; Möller 37', 90'; Chapuisat 51'		Wosz 18'; Peschel 64'	Stadium: Westfalenstadion; Attendance: 54,000; Referee: Georg Dardenne (Nettersheim)

29 August 1997 5	VfL Bochum	1 – 3	1. FC Kaiserslautern	Bochum
20:00	Stickroth 68' (pen.)		Kuka 19', 90'; Marschall 72'	Stadium: Ruhrstadion; Attendance: 28,600; Referee: Wolfgang Stark (Ergolding)

13 September 1997 6	Borussia Mönchengladbach	2 – 1	VfL Bochum	Mönchengladbach
15:30	Effenberg 78'; Juskowiak 79'		Sundermann 15'	Stadium: Bökelbergstadion; Attendance: 25,000; Referee: Lutz Wagner (Kriftel)

20 September 1997 7	VfL Bochum	2 – 1	VfL Wolfsburg	Bochum
15:30	Hutwelker 15', 24'		Präger 50'	Stadium: Ruhrstadion; Attendance: 20,091; Referee: Winfried Buchhart (Schrobenhausen)

27 September 1997 8	Hamburger SV	2 – 1	VfL Bochum	Hamburg
15:30	Spörl 52'; Zeyer 77'		Hofmann 61'	Stadium: Volksparkstadion; Attendance: 37,824; Referee: Uwe Kemmling (Kleinburgwedel)

4 October 1997 9	VfL Bochum	2 – 3	FC Bayern Munich	Bochum
15:30	Gülünoğlu 17'; Yuran 64'		Basler 24', 35'; Zickler 56'	Stadium: Ruhrstadion; Attendance: 31,222; Referee: Alfons Berg (Konz)

14 October 1997 10	Hertha BSC	2 – 2	VfL Bochum	Berlin
20:00	Mazingu-Dinzey 26' van Burik 63'		Karl 39' (o.g.); Wosz 53'	Stadium: Olympiastadion; Attendance: 36,746; Referee: Edgar Steinborn (Sinzig)

17 October 1997 11	VfL Bochum	2 – 1	1. FC Köln	Bochum
20:00	Wosz 27'; Wałdoch 90'		Thiam 66'	Stadium: Ruhrstadion; Attendance: 26,675; Referee: Markus Merk (Otterbach)

24 October 1997 12	FC Schalke 04	2 – 0	VfL Bochum	Gelsenkirchen
20:00	Wilmots 69'; Goossens 76'			Stadium: Parkstadion; Attendance: 47,640; Referee: Franz-Xaver Wack (Biberbach)

1 November 1997 13	FC Hansa Rostock	2 – 2	VfL Bochum	Rostock
15:30	Barbarez 19'; Mičevski 75'		Donkov 52'; Peschel 59'	Stadium: Ostseestadion; Attendance: 16,500; Referee: Herbert Fandel (Kyllburg)

9 November 1997 14	VfL Bochum	0 – 2	VfB Stuttgart	Bochum
18:00			Akpoborie 74'; Balakov 89'	Stadium: Ruhrstadion; Attendance: 24,039; Referee: Jörg Keßler (Höhenkirchen)

18 November 1997 15	Karlsruher SC	1 – 1	VfL Bochum	Karlsruhe
19:30	Nyarko 64'		Donkov 90'	Stadium: Wildparkstadion; Attendance: 21,000; Referee: Bernd Heynemann (Magdeburg)

21 November 1997 16	VfL Bochum	0 – 1	SV Werder Bremen	Bochum
20:00			Brand 66'	Stadium: Ruhrstadion; Attendance: 22,605; Referee: Edgar Steinborn (Sinzig)

29 November 1997 17	TSV 1860 Munich	0 – 2	VfL Bochum	Munich
15:30			Peschel 5'; Reis 15'	Stadium: Olympiastadion; Attendance: 24,700; Referee: Jürgen Aust (Cologne)

6 December 1997 18	Arminia Bielefeld	0 – 2	VfL Bochum	Bielefeld
15:30			Mamić 70'; Wosz 86'	Stadium: Alm; Attendance: 18,441; Referee: Torsten Koop (Lüttenmark)

14 December 1997 19	VfL Bochum	0 – 0	Bayer 04 Leverkusen	Bochum
18:00				Stadium: Ruhrstadion; Attendance: 22,009; Referee: Bernhard Zerr (Ottersweier)

20 December 1997 20	MSV Duisburg	2 – 0	VfL Bochum	Duisburg
15:30	Salou 49', 70'			Stadium: Wedaustadion; Attendance: 13,327; Referee: Franz-Xaver Wack (Biberbach)

30 January 1998 21	VfL Bochum	2 – 1	Borussia Dortmund	Bochum
20:00	Donkov 3'; Peschel 66'		Decheiver 81'	Stadium: Ruhrstadion; Attendance: 31,000; Referee: Bernd Heynemann (Magdeburg)

6 February 1998 22	1. FC Kaiserslautern	3 – 0	VfL Bochum	Kaiserslautern
20:00	Wagner 32'; Rische 45', 82'			Stadium: Fritz-Walter-Stadion; Attendance: 38,000; Referee: Uwe Kemmling (Kleinburgwedel)

14 February 1998 23	VfL Bochum	3 – 1	Borussia Mönchengladbach	Bochum
15:30	Dickhaut 45'; Andersson 48' (o.g.); Peschel 77'		Pettersson 27'	Stadium: Ruhrstadion; Attendance: 30,006; Referee: Edgar Steinborn (Sinzig)

28 February 1998 24	VfL Wolfsburg	0 – 2	VfL Bochum	Wolfsburg
15:30			Hofmann 16'; Bałuszyński 80'	Stadium: VfL-Stadion; Attendance: 16,122; Referee: Wolfgang Stark (Ergolding)

6 March 1998 25	VfL Bochum	0 – 0	Hamburger SV	Bochum
20:00				Stadium: Ruhrstadion; Attendance: 26,541; Referee: Franz-Xaver Wack (Biberbach)

14 March 1998 26	FC Bayern Munich	0 – 0	VfL Bochum	Munich
15:30				Stadium: Olympiastadion; Attendance: 49,000; Referee: Torsten Koop (Lüttenmark)

29 April 1998 27	VfL Bochum	2 – 1	Hertha BSC	Bochum
20:00	Yuran 10', 57'		Thom 71'	Stadium: Ruhrstadion; Attendance: 25,000; Referee: Bernhard Zerr (Ottersweier)

29 March 1998 28	1. FC Köln	2 – 1	VfL Bochum	Cologne
18:00	Polster 30', 49'		Dickhaut 51'	Stadium: Radrennbahn Müngersdorf; Attendance: 32,000; Referee: Winfried Buchhart (Schrobenhausen)

4 April 1998 29	VfL Bochum	3 – 0	FC Schalke 04	Bochum
15:30	Michalke 44'; Baştürk 74'; Mamić 87'			Stadium: Ruhrstadion; Attendance: 31,500; Referee: Markus Merk (Otterbach)

9 April 1998 30	VfL Bochum	1 – 3	FC Hansa Rostock	Bochum
20:00	Mamić 74'		Dowe 54', 60'; Pamić 90'	Stadium: Ruhrstadion; Attendance: 24,122; Referee: Jörg Keßler (Höhenkirchen)

19 April 1998 31	VfB Stuttgart	2 – 0	VfL Bochum	Stuttgart
18:00	Bobic 20'; Balakov 90' (pen.)			Stadium: Gottlieb-Daimler-Stadion; Attendance: 32,000; Referee: Hartmut Strampe (Handorf)

25 April 1998 32	VfL Bochum	3 – 3	Karlsruher SC	Bochum
15:30	Michalke 9', 58', 87'		Keller 16'; Häßler 43'; Gilewicz 74'	Stadium: Ruhrstadion; Attendance: 25,110; Referee: Lutz Michael Fröhlich (Berlin)

2 May 1998 33	SV Werder Bremen	1 – 0	VfL Bochum	Bremen
15:30	Maksymov 80'			Stadium: Weserstadion; Attendance: 35,769; Referee: Hermann Albrecht (Kaufbeuren)

9 May 1998 34	VfL Bochum	1 – 0	TSV 1860 Munich	Bochum
15:30	Ouakili 38' (o.g.)			Stadium: Ruhrstadion; Attendance: 30,000; Referee: Torsten Koop (Lüttenmark)

=== DFB-Pokal ===
15 August 1997 R1	Hamburger SV II	2 – 3	VfL Bochum	Hamburg
19:30	Reincke 25'; Poškus 72'		Kracht 19'; Stickroth 51' (pen.); Wosz 74'	Stadium: Wolfgang-Meyer-Sportanlage; Attendance: 1,225; Referee: Carsten Kadach (Suderburg)

23 September 1997 R2	MSV Duisburg	1 – 0	VfL Bochum	Duisburg
19:30	Hirsch 31'			Stadium: Wedaustadion; Attendance: 11,870; Referee: Peter Müller (Dresden)

=== DFB-Ligapokal ===
20 July 1997 R1	Borussia Dortmund	1 – 0	VfL Bochum	Koblenz
20:30	Chapuisat 89' (pen.)			Stadium: Stadion Oberwerth; Attendance: 13,000; Referee: Hans-Peter Best (Kämpfelbach)

=== UEFA Cup ===
16 September 1997 R1 1st leg	Trabzonspor (Turkey)	2 – 1	VfL Bochum	Trabzon
19:00	Hami 22' (pen.); Çetin 45'		Bałuszyński 1' (pen.)	Stadium: Avni Aker Stadium; Attendance: 12,000; Referee: Jorge Monteiro Coroado (Portugal)

30 September 1997 R1 2nd leg	VfL Bochum	5 – 3 (6 – 5 agg.)	(Turkey) Trabzonspor	Bochum
20:30	Stickroth 22'; Yuran 44', 51'; Dickhaut 60'; Peschel 68'		Missé-Missé 31'; Ogün 73'; Osman 78'	Stadium: Ruhrstadion; Attendance: 24,500; Referee: Miroslav Radoman (Yugoslavia)

21 October 1997 R2 1st leg	Club Brugge KV (Belgium)	1 – 0	VfL Bochum	Bruges
19:00	Jbari 80'			Stadium: Olympic Stadium; Attendance: 13,000; Referee: Karol Ihring (Slovakia)

6 November 1997 R2 2nd leg	VfL Bochum	4 – 1 (4 – 2 agg.)	(Belgium) Club Brugge KV	Bochum
18:00	Donkov 12' (pen.), 57'; Yuran 83'; Wosz 90'		Jbari 37'	Stadium: Ruhrstadion; Attendance: 23,900; Referee: Charles Agius (Malta)

25 November 1997 R3 1st leg	AFC Ajax (Netherlands)	4 – 2	VfL Bochum	Amsterdam
20:45	Laudrup 34', 36'; Arveladze 38'; F. de Boer 45'		Reis 20'; Wałdoch 24'	Stadium: Amsterdam Arena; Attendance: 50,000; Referee: Serge Muhmenthaler (Switzerland)

11 December 1997 R3 2nd leg	VfL Bochum	2 – 2 (4 – 6 agg.)	(Netherlands) AFC Ajax	Bochum
20:30	Hofmann 59'; Mamić 70'		Arveladze 51'; Dani 73'	Stadium: Ruhrstadion; Attendance: 24,500; Referee: Claude Colombo (France)

== Squad ==
=== Squad and statistics ===
==== Squad, appearances and goals scored ====
No.	Pos	Nat	Player	Total		Bundesliga		DFB-Pokal		DFB-Ligapokal		UEFA Cup	
No.	Pos	Nat	Player	Apps	Goals	Apps	Goals	Apps	Goals	Apps	Goals	Apps	Goals
1	GK	(Germany) GER	Uwe Gospodarek	24	0	16	0	2	0	1	0	5	0
2	DF	(Germany) GER	Thomas Stickroth	13	3	9	1	1	1	1	0	2	1
3	DF	(Germany) GER	Torsten Kracht	37	1	28	0	2	1	1	0	6	0
4	DF	(Germany) GER	Mirko Dickhaut	38	4	30	3	1	0	1	0	6	1
5	DF	(Poland) POL	Tomasz Wałdoch	33	2	27	1	2	0	0	0	4	1
6	MF	(Germany) GER	Peter Közle	17	0	12	0	1	0	1	0	3	0
7	MF	(Germany) GER	Kai Michalke	30	4	26	4	2	0	0	0	2	0
8	MF	(Germany) GER	Peter Peschel	31	7	24	6	1	0	1	0	5	1
9	FW	(Poland) POL	Henryk Bałuszyński	18	2	12	1	2	0	0	0	4	1
10	MF	(Germany) GER	Dariusz Wosz	42	7	33	5	2	1	1	0	6	1
11	FW	(Bulgaria) BUL	Georgi Donkov	28	5	23	3	0	0	1	0	4	2
12	MF	(Turkey) TUR	Yıldıray Baştürk	18	1	17	1	0	0	0	0	1	0
13	MF	(Germany) GER	Norbert Hofmann	36	3	31	2	0	0	1	0	4	1
14	DF	(Germany) GER	Karsten Hutwelker	15	2	10	2	2	0	1	0	2	0
15	FW	(Germany) GER	Danny Winkler	1	0	1	0	0	0	0	0	0	0
16	MF	(Germany) GER	Mirko Reichel	14	0	9	0	1	0	0	0	4	0
17	MF	(Germany) GER	Olaf Schreiber	35	1	27	1	2	0	1	0	5	0
18	FW	(South Africa) RSA	Delron Buckley	6	0	6	0	0	0	0	0	0	0
19	DF	(Germany) GER	Axel Sundermann	29	1	23	1	0	0	1	0	5	0
20	MF	(Croatia) CRO	Zoran Mamić	26	4	22	3	1	0	0	0	3	1
21	GK	(Germany) GER	Thomas Ernst	19	0	18	0	0	0	0	0	1	0
22	DF	(Germany) GER	Thomas Reis	31	2	23	1	2	0	1	0	5	1
23	FW	(Russia) RUS	Sergei Yuran	28	7	23	4	1	0	0	0	4	3
24	FW	(Turkey) TUR	Neşat Gülünoğlu	17	1	14	1	1	0	1	0	1	0
29	DF	(Germany) GER	Frank Fahrenhorst	8	0	7	0	0	0	0	0	1	0
31	GK	(Germany) GER	Stefan Wächter	0	0	0	0	0	0	0	0	0	0

=== Transfers ===
==== Summer ====
In:

No.	Pos.	Nation	Player
4	DF	GER	Mirko Dickhaut (from Eintracht Frankfurt)
12	MF	TUR	Yıldıray Baştürk (from SG Wattenscheid 09)
13	MF	GER	Norbert Hofmann (from SV Waldhof Mannheim)
16	MF	GER	Mirko Reichel (from SV Waldhof Mannheim)
19	DF	GER	Axel Sundermann (from SC Freiburg)
23	FW	RUS	Sergei Yuran (from Fortuna Düsseldorf)

Out:

No.	Pos.	Nation	Player
12	DF	GER	Christian Herrmann (retired)
13	DF	GER	Max Eberl (to SpVgg Greuther Fürth)
18	FW	GER	Roland Wohlfarth (to VfB Leipzig)
19	DF	GER	Mathias Jack (to Fortuna Düsseldorf)
23	MF	CRO	Filip Tapalović (to FC Schalke 04)
24	MF	ISL	Þórður Guðjónsson (to K.R.C. Genk)
