= 1998–99 1. FC Kaiserslautern season =

1. FC Kaiserslautern
1998–99 season
- Chairman: Hubert Keßler; Jürgen Friedrich
- Manager: Otto Rehhagel
- Bundesliga: 5th
- Champions League: Quarter-finals
- DFB-Pokal: Second round
- Top goalscorer: Olaf Marschall (12)
Home colours	Away colours	Third colours

Despite only gaining five less points than last season's title triumph, 1. FC Kaiserslautern were unable to defend their Bundesliga title and finished in fifth – still enough for a second successive season in European competition, in the UEFA Cup. Kaiserlautern also enjoyed a good run in their Champions League debut – topping a group also containing Benfica, PSV Eindhoven and HJK Helsinki and reaching the quarter-finals before being knocked out 6–0 on aggregate by fellow Germans Bayern Munich.

== Players ==
=== First-team squad ===
Squad at end of season

Note: Flags indicate national team as defined under FIFA eligibility rules; some limited exceptions apply. Players may hold more than one non-FIFA nationality.

No.	Pos.	Nation	Player
1	GK	GER	Andreas Reinke
2	GK	GER	Uwe Gospodarek
3	MF	GER	Michael Ballack
4	DF	GER	Axel Roos
5	DF	EGY	Samir Kamouna
6	DF	EGY	Hany Ramzy
7	MF	BUL	Marian Hristov
8	MF	GER	Martin Wagner
10	MF	SUI	Ciriaco Sforza
11	FW	GER	Olaf Marschall
12	MF	GER	Marco Reich
13	MF	NGA	Pascal Ojigwe
15	DF	HUN	János Hrutka

No.	Pos.	Nation	Player
16	DF	DEN	Michael Schjønberg
17	MF	BRA	Ratinho
18	FW	GER	Jürgen Rische
19	DF	GER	Oliver Schäfer
20	FW	GER	Uwe Rösler
22	MF	GER	Andreas Buck
23	MF	GER	Thomas Riedl
24	DF	GER	Harry Koch
25	GK	HUN	Lajos Szűcs
27	FW	GER	Daniel Graf
28	MF	BRA	Júnior
29	DF	GER	Roger Lutz

=== Left club during season ===
Note: Flags indicate national team as defined under FIFA eligibility rules; some limited exceptions apply. Players may hold more than one non-FIFA nationality.

No. / Pos. / Nation / Player; 9 / FW / CZE / Pavel Kuka (to Nürnberg)	No. / Pos. / Nation / Player; 30 / MF / GER / Thomas Franck (to Waldhof Mannheim)

== Competitions ==
Win Draw Loss Postponed

=== Bundesliga ===
==== League table ====
Pos	Team	Pld	W	D	L	GF	GA	GD	Pts	Qualification or relegation
3	Hertha BSC	34	18	8	8	59	32	+27	62	Qualification to Champions League third qualifying round
4	Borussia Dortmund	34	16	9	9	48	34	+14	57	Qualification to Champions League third qualifying round
5	1. FC Kaiserslautern	34	17	6	11	51	47	+4	57	Qualification to UEFA Cup first round
6	VfL Wolfsburg	34	15	10	9	54	49	+5	55	Qualification to UEFA Cup first round
7	Hamburger SV	34	13	11	10	47	46	+1	50	Qualification to Intertoto Cup third round

Source: www.dfb.de
Rules for classification: 1) points; 2) goal difference; 3) number of goals scored.

==== Matches ====
15 August 1998 1	1860 Munich	1–2	1. FC Kaiserslautern	Munich
15:30	Winkler 12' (pen.)		Marschall 42'; Kamouna 62'	Stadium: Olympiastadion; Attendance: 56,000; Referee: Jürgen Aust (Cologne)

22 August 1998 2	Kaiserslautern	2–1	Borussia Mönchengladbach	Kaiserslautern
15:30	Wagner 42'; Marschall 63'		Ašanin 83'	Stadium: Fritz-Walter-Stadion; Attendance: 63,000; Referee: Bernhard Zurr (Ottersweier)

8 September 1998 3	VfB Stuttgart	4–0	1. FC Kaiserslautern	Stuttgart
20:00	Ristić 32', 79'; Bobic 71'; Balakov 85' (pen.)			Stadium: Gottlieb-Daimler-Stadion; Attendance: 39,000; Referee: Jürgen Jansen (Essen)

12 September 1998 4	Kaiserslautern	4–3	Hertha Berlin	Kaiserslautern
15:30	Marschall 5', 68'; Schjønberg 72' (pen.), 82'		Veit 1'; Thom 45'; Dárdai 53'	Stadium: Fritz-Walter-Stadion; Attendance: 39,800; Referee: Georg Dardenne (Nettersheim)

19 September 1998 5	1. FC Nürnberg	1–1	Kaiserslautern	Nuremberg
15:30	Kuka 40'		Marschall 86'	Stadium: Frankenstadion; Attendance: 44,500; Referee: Jörg Keßler (Höhenkirchen-Siegertsbrunn)

26 September 1998 6	Kaiserslautern	2–3	VfL Bochum	Kaiserslautern
15:30	Sundermann 5' (o.g.); Marschall 58'		Reis 60'; Buckley 67'; Dzafič 74'	Stadium: Fritz-Walter-Stadion; Attendance: 41,500; Referee: Franz-Xaver Wack (Biberbach)

3 October 1998 7	Bayer Leverkusen	2–2	Kaiserslautern	Leverkusen
15:30	Zé Roberto 8'; Paulo Rink 65'		Marschall 31'; Hristov 41'	Stadium: BayArena; Attendance: 22,500; Referee: Hellmut Krug (Gelsenkirchen)

16 October 1998 8	Kaiserslautern	1–1	VfL Wolfsburg	Kaiserslautern
20:00	Reich 50'		Dammeier 73'	Stadium: Fritz-Walter-Stadion; Attendance: 40,061; Referee: Helmut Fleischer (Ulm)

24 October 1998 9	Bayern Munich	4–0	Kaiserslautern	Munich
15:30	Basler 10'; Daei 45'; Élber 52', 56'			Stadium: Olympiastadion; Attendance: 63,000; Referee: Bernd Heynemann (Magdeburg)

30 October 1998 10	Kaiserslautern	3–2	Hansa Rostock	Kaiserslautern
20:00	Marschall 50'; Ballack 67'; Rösler 73'		Pamić 3'; Neuville 23'	Stadium: Fritz-Walter-Stadion; Attendance: 39,910; Referee: Lutz Michael Fröhlich (Berlin)

7 November 1998 11	Freiburg	0–1	Kaiserslautern	Freiburg
15:30			Hristov 37'	Stadium: Dreisamstadion; Attendance: 22,500; Referee: Hartmut Strampe (Handorf)

10 November 1998 12	Kaiserslautern	1–0	Hamburg	Kaiserslautern
20:00	Rösler 83'			Stadium: Fritz-Walter-Stadion; Attendance: 40,112; Referee: Uwe Kemmling (Kleinburgwedel)

13 November 1998 13	Werder Bremen	0–1	Kaiserslautern	Bremen, Bremen
20:00			Ramzy 75'	Stadium: Weserstadion; Attendance: 28,500; Referee: Wolfgang Stark (Ergolding)

21 November 1998 14	Kaiserslautern	1–0	Borussia Dortmund	Kaiserslautern
15:30	Reich 78'			Stadium: Fritz-Walter-Stadion; Attendance: 41,500; Referee: Hermann Albrecht (Kaufbeuren)

29 November 1998 15	Kaiserslautern	4–1	Schalke 04	Kaiserslautern
18:00	Hristov 9'; Rösler 67'; Hrutka 71'; Marschall 74' (pen.)		Max 34'	Stadium: Fritz-Walter-Stadion; Attendance: 41,500; Referee: Bernhard Zerr (Ottersweier)

12 December 1998 16	Duisburg	3–1	Kaiserslautern	Duisburg
19:30	Beierle 50'; Tøfting 64'; Andersen 90'		Rösler 42'	Stadium: MSV-Arena; Attendance: 41,500; Referee: Herbert Fandel (Kyllburg)

16 December 1998 17	Kaiserslautern	2–1	Eintracht Frankfurt	Kaiserslautern
15:30	Ballack 4'; Ramzy 90'		Stojak 73'	Stadium: Fritz-Walter-Stadion; Attendance: 41,500; Referee: Winfried Buchhart (Schrobenhausen)

19 December 1998 18	Kaiserslautern	1–1	1860 Munich	Kaiserslautern
15:30	Reich 62'		Winkler 51'	Stadium: Fritz-Walter-Stadion; Attendance: 41,500; Referee: Hartmut Strampe (Handorf)

21 February 1999 19	Borussia Mönchengladbach	0–2	Kaiserslautern	Mönchengladbach
15:30			Marschall 27'; Ašanin 54' (o.g.)	Stadium: Borussia-Park; Attendance: 25,000; Referee: Alfons Berg (Konz)

26 February 1999 20	Kaiserslautern	1–1	Stuttgart	Kaiserslautern
20:00	Ramzy 65'		Bobic 60'	Stadium: Fritz-Walter-Stadion; Attendance: 41,500; Referee: Hellmut Krug (Gelsenkirchen)

6 March 1999 21	Hertha Berlin	1–1	Kaiserslautern	Berlin
15:30	Preetz 79'		Ballack 3'	Stadium: Olympiastadion; Attendance: 54,433; Referee: Bernd Heynemann (Magdeburg)

13 March 1999 22	Kaiserslautern	2–0	Nürnberg	Kaiserslautern
15:30	Rösler 39'; Ratinho 61'			Stadium: Fritz-Walter-Stadion; Attendance: 41,500; Referee: Torsten Koop (Lüttenmark)

20 March 1999 23	Bochum	1–2	Kaiserslautern	Bochum
15:30	Zeyer 42'		Ratinho 59'; Rösler 86'	Stadium: rewirpowerSTADION; Attendance: 23,670; Referee: Hartmut Strampe (Handorf)

3 April 1999 24	Kaiserslautern	0–1	Leverkusen	Leverkusen
20:15			Kirsten 42'	Stadium: BayArena; Attendance: 41,500; Referee: Jürgen Jansen (Essen)

10 April 1999 25	VfL Wolfsburg	2–1	Kaiserslautern	Wolfsburg
15:30	Präger 42', 70'	Report	Ballack 75' (pen.)	Stadium: VfL-Stadion am Elsterweg; Attendance: 18,000; Referee: Bernhard Zerr

13 April 1999 26	Kaiserslautern	2–1	Bayern Munich	Kaiserslautern
20:00 CEST	Buck 29'; Rische 43'	Report	Daei 43'	Stadium: Fritz-Walter-Stadion; Attendance: 41,500; Referee: Lutz Michael Fröhlich (Berlin)

16 April 1999 27	Hansa Rostock	2–1	Kaiserslautern
		Report

24 April 1999 28	Kaiserslautern	0–2	SC Freiburg
		Report

1 May 1999 29	Hamburger SV	2–0	Kaiserslautern
		Report

4 May 1999 30	Kaiserslautern	4–0	Werder Bremen
		Report

8 May 1999 31	Borussia Dortmund	1–0	Kaiserslautern
		Report

16 May 1999 32	FC Schalke 04	0–2	Kaiserslautern
		Report

22 May 1999 33	Kaiserslautern	3–0	MSV Duisburg	Kaiserslautern
15:30 CEST	Marschall 3', 25'; Buck 36'	Report		Stadium: Fritz-Walter-Stadion; Attendance: 41,500; Referee: Hellmut Krug

29 May 1999 34	Eintracht Frankfurt	5–1	Kaiserslautern	Frankfurt
15:30 CEST	Yang 46'; Sobotzik 70'; Gebhardt 80'; B Schneider 82'; Fjørtoft 89'	Report	Schjønberg 68' (pen.)	Stadium: Waldstadion; Attendance: 58,000; Referee: Jürgen Jansen

== Kits ==
Home	Home Alternate	Away	Away Alternate	Away Alt. 2	Away Alt. 3	Third
