= Gaugler =

Gaugler is a surname. Notable people with the surname include:

- Eduard Gaugler (1928–2014), German researcher
- Sarah Gaugler, Filipino-American tattoo artist, visual artist, designer, illustrator, model, actress, and musician
- Yves Gaugler (born 1969), German footballer
