= Michael Ballack =

German footballer (born 1976)

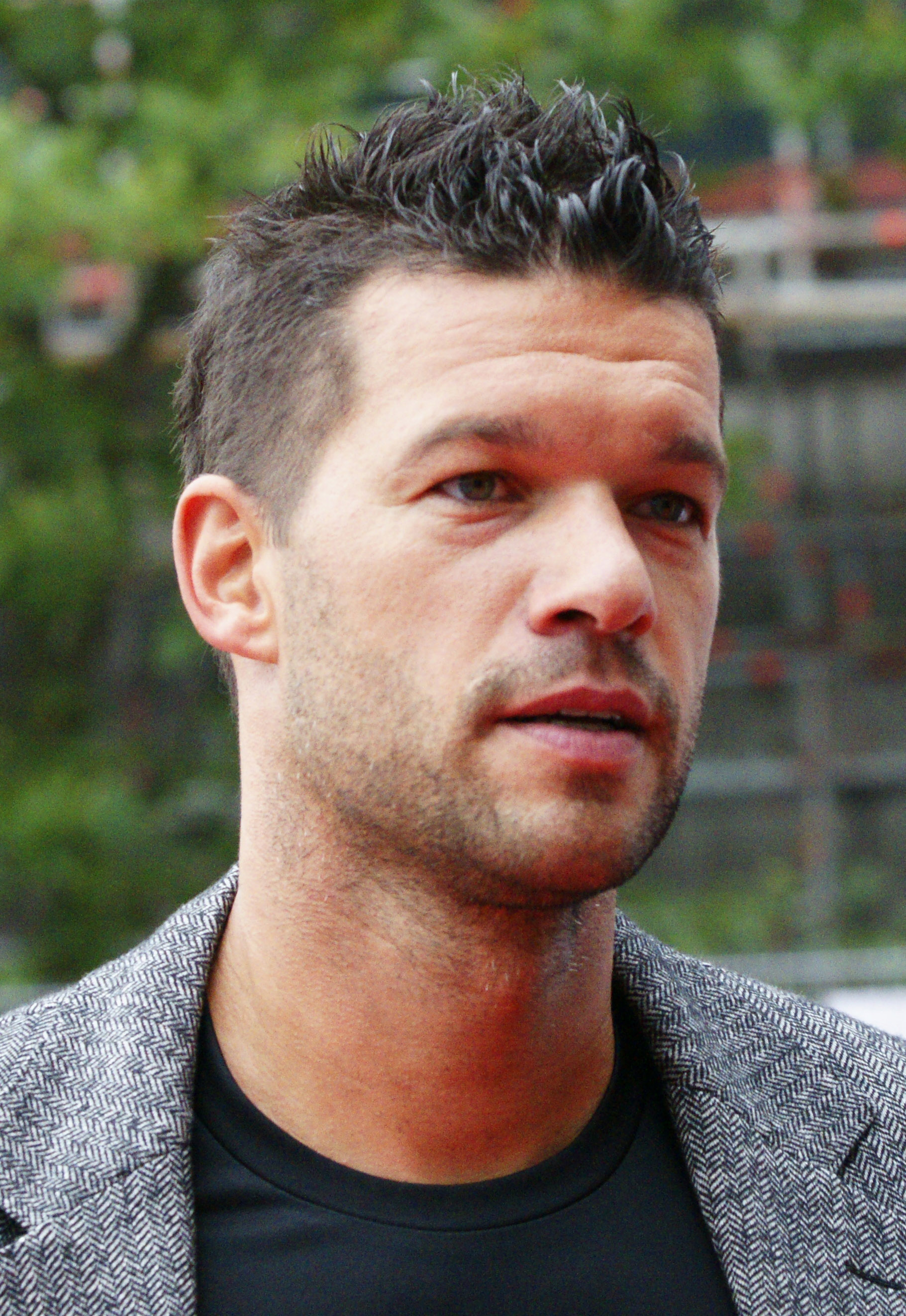
- Ballack in 2014

Personal information
- Full name: Michael Ballack
- Date of birth: 26 September 1976 (age 50)
- Place of birth: Görlitz, East Germany
- Height: 1.89 m (6 ft 2 in)
- Position: Midfielder

Youth career
- 1983–1988: BSG Motor "Fritz Heckert" Karl-Marx-Stadt
- 1988–1995: Chemnitzer FC

Senior career*
Years	Team	Apps	(Gls)
1995–1997	Chemnitzer FC II	18	(5)
1995–1997	Chemnitzer FC	49	(10)
1997–1998	1. FC Kaiserslautern II	17	(8)
1997–1999	1. FC Kaiserslautern	46	(4)
1999–2002	Bayer Leverkusen	79	(27)
2002–2006	Bayern Munich	107	(44)
2006–2010	Chelsea	105	(17)
2010–2012	Bayer Leverkusen	35	(2)
Total		456	(117)

International career
1996–1998	Germany U21	19	(7)
1999–2010	Germany	98	(42)
Medal record
Men's football
Representing Germany
FIFA World Cup
Runner-up	2002 Korea/Japan
Third place	2006 Germany
UEFA European Championship
Runner-up	2008 Austria–Switzerland
FIFA Confederations Cup
Third place	2005 Germany
- * Club domestic league appearances and goals

Michael Ballack (German pronunciation: [ˈmɪçaʔeːl ˈbalak]; born 26 September 1976) is a German former professional footballer who is now a football agent. He was selected by Pelé as one of FIFA's 100 Greatest Living Players, and as the UEFA Club Midfielder of the Year in 2002. He won the German Footballer of the Year award three times – in 2002, 2003 and 2005. Ballack was known for his passing range, powerful shot, strength and commanding presence in midfield.

Ballack began his career as a youth at enterprise sports community BSG Motor "Fritz Heckert" Karl-Marx-Stadt in 1983. He then joined the youth department of football club FC Karl-Marx-Stadt. Ballack made his debut for Germany's under-21 side on 26 March 1996. Although the team were relegated in his first season, his performances in the Regionalliga the following season led to a transfer to 1. FC Kaiserslautern in 1997. He won the Bundesliga in his first season at the club, his first major achievement . He became a first team regular in 1998–99 season and also earned his first senior national cap for Germany. He moved to Bayer Leverkusen for €4.1 million in 1999. The 2001–02 season saw him win a slew of runners-up medals: Bayer Leverkusen finished second in the Bundesliga, DFB-Pokal, UEFA Champions League and Germany lost to Brazil in the 2002 World Cup Final.

A €12.9 million move to Bayern Munich led to further honours: the team won the Bundesliga and DFB-Pokal double in 2003, 2005 and 2006. Ballack had become a prolific goalscorer from midfield, scoring 58 goals for Bayern between 2002 and 2006. He joined Premier League club Chelsea in mid-2006 and won English honours in his first season at the club. Injury ruled him out of much of 2007, but he returned the following season to help Chelsea reach their first ever Champions League final. He also went on to win the FA Cup again in 2009 and then once more as part of a league and cup double in 2010.

Internationally, Ballack has played in the UEFA European Football Championship in 2000, 2004 and 2008, and the FIFA World Cup in 2002 and 2006. Jürgen Klinsmann appointed him captain of the national team in 2004. Ballack scored consecutive game-winning goals in the quarter-final and semi-final to help his country to the 2002 World Cup final and led his team to the semi-finals of the 2006 World Cup and the Euro 2008 final. He is among the top goal scorers in the history of the Germany national team.

== Early life ==
Ballack was born on 26 September 1976 in Görlitz, a town in Bezirk Dresden, East Germany (now Saxony, Germany). He is the only child of Stephan Ballack, an engineer, and his wife Karin, a secretary. The family moved to Chemnitz (then called Karl-Marx-Stadt) when Ballack was very young and it was there that he started to play football. He first began playing football for sports community.

== Club career ==
=== Chemnitzer FC ===
Ballack's parents sent him to train with sports community BSG Motor "Fritz Heckert" Karl-Marx-Stadt at the age of seven. Ballack was praised by coach Steffen Hänisch. Hänisch was particularly impressed by the well-developed technique for Ballack's age and his ability to shoot with both feet. Ballack was then allowed to attend the elite Children and Youth Sports School (KSJ) "Emil Wallner" in Karl-Marx-Stadt. He then joined the larger and more promoted football club FC Karl-Marx-Stadt (renamed Chemnitzer FC in 1990) in 1988. The father of Ballack had played second-division football himself in Germany.

In 1995, Ballack earned his first professional contract, thanks to his performances in the role of central midfielder. He was dubbed the "Little Kaiser", in reference to Franz Beckenbauer, who was nicknamed "Der Kaiser". His professional debut came on 4 August 1995, on the first day of the new 2. Bundesliga season. Chemnitz lost the game 2–1, against VfB Leipzig. At the end of the season, during which Ballack made 15 appearances, Chemnitz were relegated to the multi-tiered, regional third division. The following season, Ballack became a regular first-team player as Chemnitz missed out on an immediate return to the Bundesliga. He did not miss a game and scored ten goals for the "Sky Blues". It was not enough for Chemnitz to be promoted, but in the summer of 1997, coach Otto Rehhagel of just-promoted 1. FC Kaiserslautern signed Ballack at their return to top flight football.

=== 1. FC Kaiserslautern ===
It was during the seventh match of the 1997–98 Bundesliga season, away to Karlsruhe, that Rehhagel decided to give Ballack his first Bundesliga appearance, substituting him onto the field for the final five minutes of the encounter. On 28 March 1998, Ballack made his first-team debut-start against Bayer Leverkusen.

Ballack made 16 appearances for his new team during the season as the club became the first-ever newly promoted team to lift the Bundesliga title. In the following season, Ballack became both a regular member of the team (he made 30 appearances, scoring 4 goals in the league) and one of the side's leading players. Kaiserslautern reached the quarter finals of the Champions League, but were eliminated by Bayern Munich.

On 1 July 1999, Ballack moved to Bayer Leverkusen at age 22 for a transfer fee of €4.1 million.

=== Bayer Leverkusen ===
It was at Bayer Leverkusen that Ballack made his breakthrough. Coaches Christoph Daum and Klaus Toppmöller granted him an attacking role in the midfield. Ballack was instrumental to the success of Leverkusen, scoring 27 goals in the league and nine in Europe over the course of his three seasons at the BayArena.

In 2000, Bayer Leverkusen needed only a draw against minnows SpVgg Unterhaching to win the Bundesliga title, but an own goal by Ballack helped send the team to a crushing 0–2 defeat, while Bayern Munich clinched the title with a 3–1 victory over Werder Bremen. The 2001–02 season was a disappointing one for Bayer Leverkusen. In the Bundesliga, the team surrendered a five-point lead at the top of the table over the last three games of the season to finish second behind Borussia Dortmund; lost the UEFA Champions League final 2–1 to Real Madrid; and lost the DFB-Pokal final 4–2 to Schalke 04. These three runner-up finishes were dubbed a "Treble Horror": Bayer Leverkusen was dubbed "Bayer Neverkusen" in English, while the German nickname became Vizekusen. Ballack and Leverkusen teammates Bernd Schneider, Carsten Ramelow and Oliver Neuville were also beaten finalists with Germany in the 2002 FIFA World Cup, although Ballack was suspended for the final itself. Ballack finished with 17 league goals and his performance over the season led to him being voted into the UEFA.com users' Team of 2002 as well as being named German Footballer of the Year.

=== Bayern Munich ===
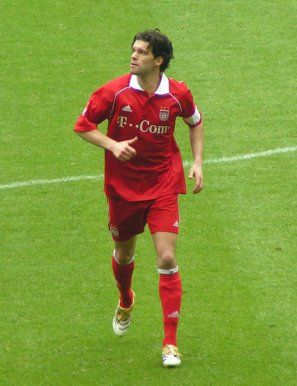
Ballack playing for Bayern Munich in April 2006

In spite of Real Madrid's interest, Ballack decided to sign with Bayern Munich in a €6 million deal in 2002 after his impressive performances in the World Cup. In his first season with the club, Bayern won the Bundesliga with 75 points as well as the DFB-Pokal, with Ballack scoring twice and defeating former club 1. FC Kaiserslautern in the latter's final. In his second season, however, Bayern lost both their Bundesliga and DFB-Pokal crowns to Werder Bremen.

In his third season with the Bavarians, Ballack enjoyed success in the 2004–05 season as Bayern Munich completed another double. New coach Felix Magath stated he was the only automatic starter in their midfield. In four seasons at Bayern, Ballack won three Bundesliga and DFB-Pokal doubles, scoring 44 goals in 107 Bundesliga matches. Between 1998 and 2005, Ballack scored 61 goals in total in the domestic league.

Ballack's critics, however, noted his frequent "choking" in important Champions League matches. This resulted in open public criticism from club general manager Uli Hoeneß, communications director Karl-Heinz Rummenigge and club president Franz Beckenbauer, all former Bayern players. Beckenbauer later went as far as to accuse Ballack of "saving his strength" for prospective employers after Ballack turned in an average performance in the 2006 DFB-Pokal final against Eintracht Frankfurt.

=== Chelsea ===
Ballack agreed to join English Premier League club Chelsea on a free transfer on 15 May 2006. During his last season with Bayern, there were rumours of interest from Manchester United, Real Madrid, Internazionale and Milan, but Ballack instead chose to go to Stamford Bridge. Shortly after arriving at Chelsea, Ballack stated that he hoped to end his career at Chelsea.

==== 2006–07 season ====
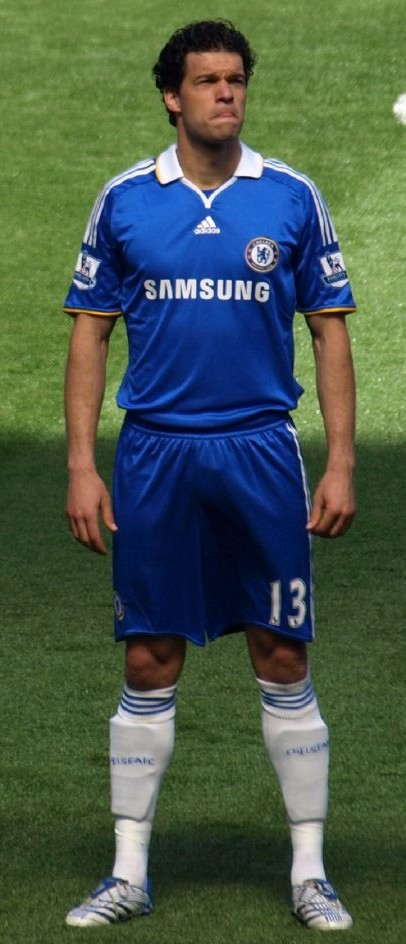
Ballack with Chelsea in 2008

Ballack's debut for Chelsea came on 31 July 2006, during a practice match at UCLA's intramural football pitch. Chelsea presented him to the media the following day where the club also gave him his favoured number 13 shirt, worn throughout his career. Upon doing so, William Gallas, who previously wore the number 13 shirt for Chelsea, was given the number 3 shirt. This move created animosity between Gallas and the club as Gallas felt that he was underappreciated. Ballack made his competitive debut in the 2006 FA Community Shield, but went off injured in the first half. On 27 August 2006, Ballack made his Premier League debut for Chelsea against Blackburn Rovers. On 12 September, he scored his first goal for the club on his Champions League debut against Werder Bremen.

He received the first straight red card of his career in Chelsea's 1–0 win over Liverpool on 17 September 2006, after being judged to have stamped on Mohamed Sissoko's leg. Ballack scored his first Premier League goal on 21 October 2006 against Portsmouth at Stamford Bridge with a header. His first FA Cup goal came in the 109th minute in the semi-final against Blackburn on 15 April 2007. This goal resulted in Chelsea progressing into the FA Cup final. He scored eight goals in all competitions for the club in the 2006–07 season, including a free-kick against Everton at Goodison Park, as well as a half-volley against Porto which sent Chelsea through to the quarter-finals of the Champions League. Throughout his first season at Chelsea, Ballack was criticised for his lethargic performances – for playing as though he had "a huge cigar in his mouth".

On 29 April 2007, Chelsea released a statement on their official website, informing fans that Ballack had undergone ankle surgery in Munich. As a result, Ballack did not play in the FA Cup final against Manchester United, which Chelsea won 1–0 through Didier Drogba's extra time goal. This was Ballack's second trophy this season, his first being the League Cup, the final of which he started.

==== 2007–08 season ====
Despite persistent rumours in the summer 2007 transfer window, Ballack denied that he wanted to leave and no such move materialised. Chelsea left Ballack out of their Champions League squad for the 2007–08 group stage as they realised that his injury would prevent him from playing any useful part and preferred to select the fully fit Steve Sidwell. The German international had an ankle operation in the summer and Chelsea could not take the risk of him not regaining full fitness before the end of the group stage. Thus, Ballack could not play in the Champions League before the knockout stages began in February. The club was only able to select 23 out of a possible 25 players for their Champions League squad due to the new UEFA regulations on "association-trained players" and "club-trained players". Due to this regulation, Chelsea were also unable to select young player Scott Sinclair and could only pick 23 players as their only "club-trained player" was John Terry. For this reason, it was deemed unwise to gamble on Ballack being fit at some point.

Ballack made his return to the side in Chelsea's 2–0 League Cup win over Liverpool on 19 December 2007. Ballack tallied an assist late in the game to striker Andriy Shevchenko. On 26 December 2007, Ballack made his Premier League return in a thrilling game against Aston Villa which ended 4–4. He came on for Frank Lampard in the 26th minute after the latter had picked up a thigh injury. In first-half stoppage time, he won a penalty after being brought down in the box by Zat Knight, which Andriy Shevchenko converted. In the 88th minute, with the score tied at 3–3, Ballack stepped up to take a free-kick, which he buried into the bottom left corner of the goal, but the match ended in a 4–4 draw.

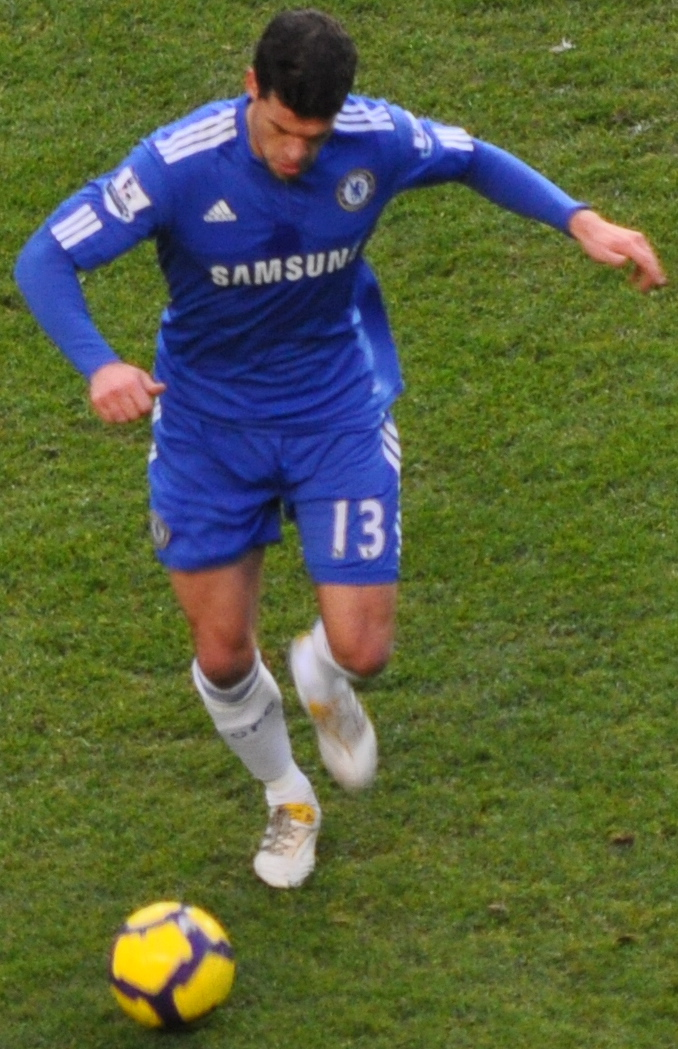
Ballack in action against Fulham in December 2009

Ballack captained the Chelsea team in the absence of captain John Terry and vice-captain Frank Lampard in a 2–1 win over Newcastle United on 29 December 2007. Ballack then played his 50th game in a Chelsea shirt in a 2–1 win against Fulham in which he scored the winning goal for Chelsea. He also scored the only goal that won the match for Chelsea against Reading to extend the blues' winning streak to a record of nine. And, on 5 March 2007, he scored again, this time against Olympiacos in the Champions League round of 16 in a 3–0 win. He scored the winning goal in the 2–0 win in the second leg of the quarter-finals against Fenerbahçe, a victory that secured Chelsea a place in the semi-finals.

Ballack continued to score vital goals and, on 26 April 2008, he scored a header and a penalty to give Chelsea a 2–1 win over Manchester United. He was named Man of The Match for his performance. It brought the two teams level in the race for the Premier League title only two matchdays before the end of the season.

The season ended on a low note for Ballack as Chelsea finished runners-up in the League Cup, Premier League and Champions League. This completed another treble horror for Ballack and his club. On 29 June 2008, Germany, captained by Ballack, lost to Spain 1–0 in the final of UEFA Euro 2008. This became the second season in Ballack's career after 2002 that he was runner-up for four major trophies.

==== 2008–09 season ====
The 2008–09 season started well for Ballack, as he set up Joe Cole to score the first goal in a 4–0 win over Portsmouth in the first game of the season. Ballack was injured shortly after missing the games against Manchester United, Liverpool and Arsenal. Ballack's return from injury has been a lift for Chelsea as he set up Deco to score a scissor kick in a 2–0 win against Bolton Wanderers. Ballack's first goal of the '09 season came against Southend United in their FA Cup replay, a match which Chelsea went on to win 4–1. Ballack's first Premier League goal of the 2008–09 season came on 11 April 2009 in a match against Bolton, ending 4–3 for Chelsea. He came on as a second-half substitute as Chelsea won the 2009 FA Cup final. On 2 June 2009, Ballack signed a one-year contract extension with Chelsea.

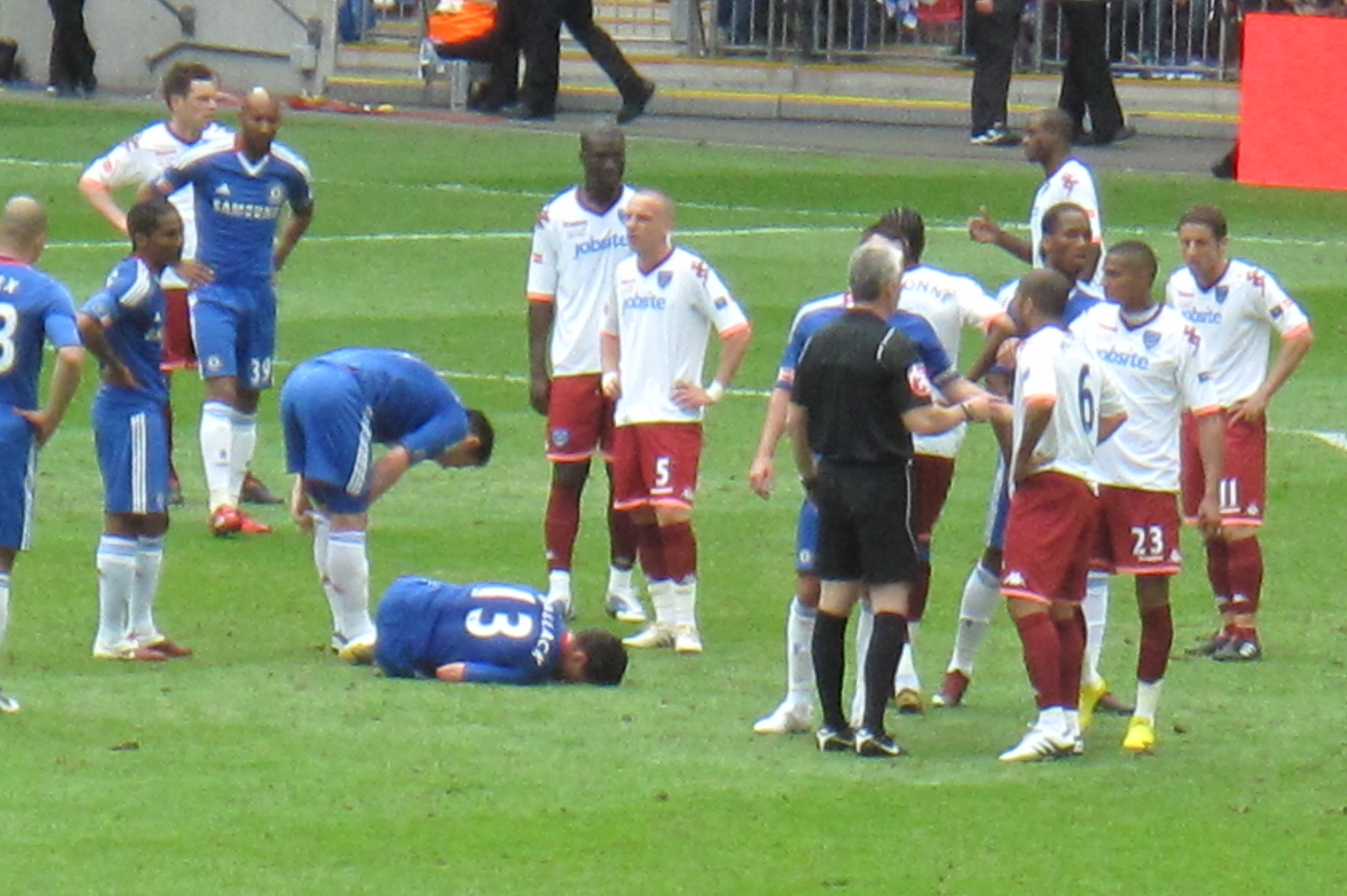
Ballack on the ground with the ankle injury in the 2010 FA Cup Final that eventually ruled him out of the World Cup after a tackle from Boateng (23)

==== 2009–10 season ====
In Chelsea's second game of the season, away at Sunderland, Ballack scored his first goal of the 2009–10 campaign in their 3–1 win. Ballack also scored against Burnley in a 3–0 win. Ballack made his first Champions League appearance for the season against Porto. On 20 September 2009, he scored his third league goal, against Tottenham. On 17 January 2010, he scored his fourth league goal and third assist in a 7–2 win against Sunderland. In Chelsea's fifth round FA Cup tie against Cardiff City, Ballack scored the goal which put the Blues back in front; Chelsea ultimately won 4–1.

Ballack was sent off in Chelsea's 4–2 defeat against Manchester City on 27 February 2010. Chelsea went on to win the 2009–10 Premier League, Ballack's first league title in England. He also started as Chelsea were victorious against Portsmouth in the 2010 FA Cup final, however he would come off injured shortly before half-time after a tackle by Kevin-Prince Boateng. As a result of the injury, Ballack was not able to participate in the 2010 World Cup.

On 9 June 2010, it was announced that Ballack, along with teammates Joe Cole and Juliano Belletti, would leave Chelsea on a free transfer after his contract was not renewed. It was reported that while manager Carlo Ancelotti wanted to retain Ballack, club owner Roman Abramovich was only willing to offer a one-year deal due to Ballack's age. As of December 2012, Ballack had the lowest loss record of any player with more than 100 appearances in the Premier League, losing just 10 of his 105 appearances.

=== Return to Bayer Leverkusen ===
On 25 June 2010, Ballack signed a two-year contract with former club Bayer Leverkusen. On 19 August 2010, he scored the first goal for Leverkusen in a 3–0 win against Tavriya Simferopol in the UEFA Europa League qualifiers. On 6 October 2010, it was announced that Ballack would not play again in 2010 at the club or international level due to a shin injury sustained 11 September 2010 in a Bundesliga match against Hannover 96.

On 20 February 2011, Ballack made his return from injury, coming on as a substitute for Simon Rolfes against VfB Stuttgart; Leverkusen won the match 4–2. Ballack scored his second Europa League goal against Metalist Kharkiv, a match Leverkusen won 2–0 and the two-legged tie 6–0 on aggregate to progress to the round of 16. Ballack played the full 90 minutes against Schalke 04, assisting Eren Derdiyok's goal in an eventual 2–0 victory.

=== Retirement ===
Ballack announced his retirement on 2 October 2012. He had been in talks with Major League Soccer's Montreal Impact and A-League club Western Sydney Wanderers.

On 5 June 2013, Ballack played a farewell match at Leipzig's Red Bull Arena. The match was won by a World XI 4–3 against the "Friends of Ballack", with Ballack scoring his second hat-trick in his career. First he scored two goals with "Friends of Ballack" in the first half and scored his third goal and the winner in the second half for the World XI. Participants in the match included former teammates and friends Lothar Matthäus, Didier Drogba, Miroslav Klose, Andriy Shevchenko, Phillip Lahm, Hasan Salihamidžić, Dimitar Berbatov, Michael Essien, André Schürrle, Ricardo Carvalho, Dietmar Hamann, Florent Malouda, Carsten Jancker, Torsten Frings, Jens Lehmann, Christian Wörns, Mehdi Mahdavikia and Per Mertesacker, as well as Formula 1 racing driver Michael Schumacher. The teams were coached by Ballack's former Chelsea coach José Mourinho and his former national team coach Rudi Völler.

== Post-playing career ==
He is now a football agent for German footballer Lennart Karl.

== International career ==
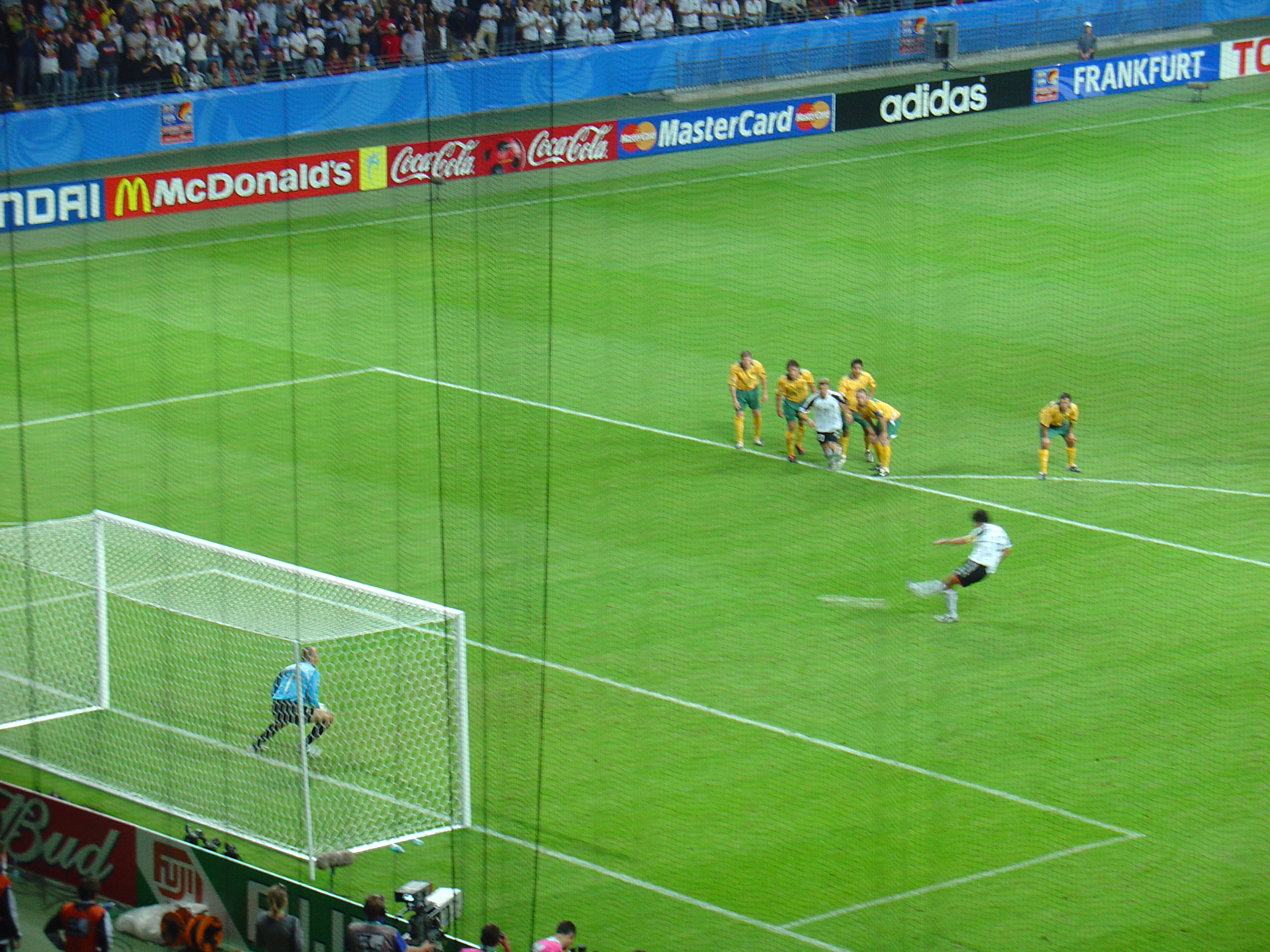
Ballack converting a penalty for Germany at the 2005 Confederations Cup in a match against Australia

On 26 March 1996, Ballack debuted for the Germany national under-21 team against Denmark, shortly after signing for Chemnitzer FC. In all, he played 19 matches for this side, scoring four goals. Then, following his move to 1. FC Kaiserslautern, senior team head coach Berti Vogts called him up to the squad.

Ballack's first senior Germany appearance, however, did not come until 28 April 1999, when he came on as a substitute for Dietmar Hamann in a match against Scotland.

Ballack only played 63 minutes at UEFA Euro 2000. In the 2002 FIFA World Cup, he scored in matches against the United States and South Korea during the knockout rounds as Germany reached the final. However, he was booked for a tactical foul during the semi-final match against South Korea and was suspended for the final, which Germany went on to lose 2–0 to Brazil. He was included in the World Cup All Star Team. Ballack missing the final ultimately led to a lasting revision of the yellow card amnesty rule in order "to give the best players a chance to play in the final". Following Euro 2004, Jürgen Klinsmann replaced Rudi Völler at the helm of the national team and Ballack took over from Oliver Kahn as captain. He scored three goals — all penalties — in the 2005 Confederations Cup, in which Germany were eliminated by Brazil in the semifinals.

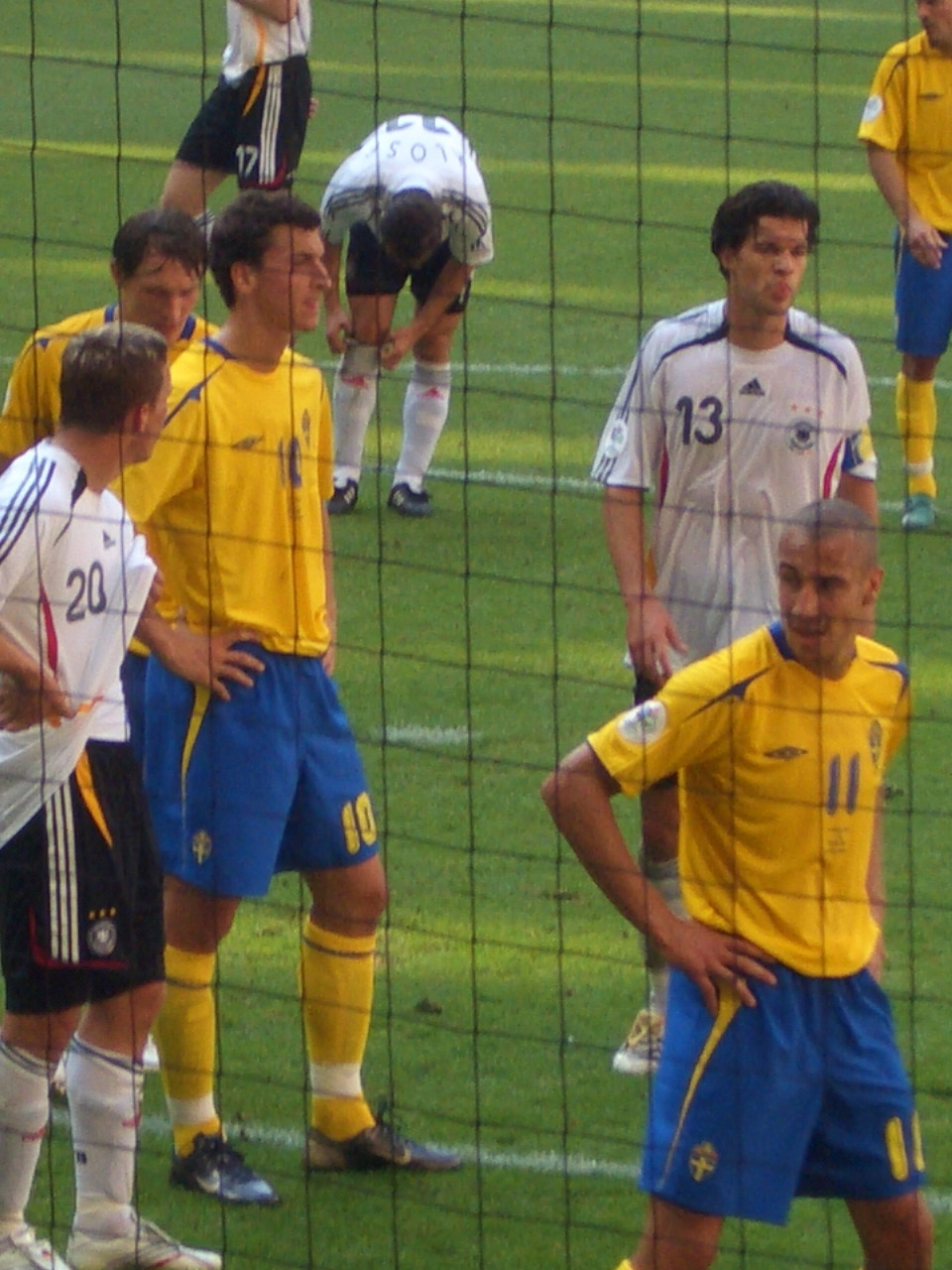
Ballack (#13) during the match against Sweden at the 2006 World Cup

In the 2006 World Cup, he was unable to start in Germany's first game against Costa Rica due to a calf strain, but appeared in the following five matches. Germany were eliminated in the semi-finals, but they managed to clinch third place in a match against Portugal. He was named Man of the Match in the games against Ecuador and Argentina, and was included in FIFA's World Cup All Star Team for a second consecutive time. After the tournament, Klinsmann stood down as national team head coach and was succeeded by assistant Joachim Löw.

Ballack started and captained Germany in their first game of Euro 2008 against Poland. He proved to be an influential figure in the midfield as Germany came back from a shock defeat to Croatia to make it to the final, scoring a free kick against Austria to secure Germany a 1–0 win and a place in the quarter-finals. In the quarter-finals, he scored a header against Portugal to make the score 3–1 in their 3–2 win after an assist by Bastian Schweinsteiger's 60th minute free-kick, helping Germany to advance to the semi-finals. Germany went on to beat Turkey 3–2 in the semifinals. Prior to the final, Ballack sustained a calf injury but eventually overcame it in time. Germany, however, ended up losing 1–0 to Spain. Nevertheless, he was named in the Squad of the Tournament.

Ballack scored four goals in the 2010 World Cup qualifiers, but missed the 2010 World Cup after suffering an ankle injury from a foul by Portsmouth's Kevin-Prince Boateng in the 2010 FA Cup final. Ballack did travel to South Africa to provide moral support for the national team but he departed after Philipp Lahm, who was appointed team captain due to Ballack's injury, commented after the quarter-finals that he would not relinquish the captaincy back to Ballack. Team manager Oliver Bierhoff criticized Lahm's comments and clarified the situation, saying, "Philipp Lahm is the World Cup captain and Michael Ballack is still the captain."

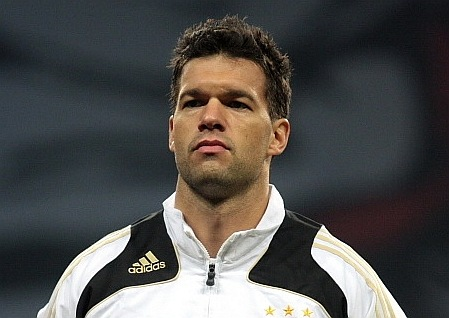
Ballack in 2009

Germany played strongly in the tournament despite Ballack's absence, including a 4–1 win over England and a 4–0 win over Argentina en route to finishing third, thanks to emerging midfield talents such as Sami Khedira, Thomas Müller, and Mesut Özil. Former German captain Lothar Matthäus suggested that Ballack's absence had allowed these young players to blossom.

Since the 2010 World Cup qualifiers, Ballack had not been called up for any international matches. It was reported that Germany coach Joachim Löw was waiting for Ballack to retire from international football after the 2010 World Cup, however Ballack refused to give up despite a rash of injuries suffered in 2010–11 with Bayer Leverkusen. On 16 June 2011, it was announced that Ballack would no longer be a part of the national team. The German Football Association (DFB) offered him two friendlies to reach 100 matches for Germany, which he refused, accusing Löw of disrespecting him ever since his injury dating back to March 2010 and calling the invitation to compete in another two games for Germany a "farce".

== Style of play ==
Ballack is considered to be one of the best and most versatile midfielders of his generation; normally deployed in the centre in a box-to-box role, he played in several midfield positions during his career, including in the roles of offensive and holding midfielder, and was noted for his powerful shot with both feet. Due to his tall frame, he was also known for his ability in the air, which made him a goal threat on set pieces. He also excelled at making late runs into the penalty area. On a technical level, he was a commanding, physically strong and aggressive player, with excellent passing range, who moved the ball efficiently, and who was capable of creating chances for his team. An elegant player on the ball, the technicality and intelligence of his game was extremely high. He started his football career as a sweeper, but when he moved to Leverkusen in 1999, then-coach Christoph Daum moved him to midfield. He adapted to playing in a deeper role on occasion during his spell at Chelsea. Ballack was also a strong tackler, which combined with his stamina, as well as his aerial, playmaking, and goalscoring abilities, made him a "complete midfielder," as he was once described by Ben Welch of FourFourTwo magazine in 2013. Beyond his playing ability, Ballack also stood out for his leadership qualities throughout his career. In 2011, Ballack's international coach at the time, Joachim Löw, praised him, describing him as a player who "exudes authority and calm on the pitch". Despite his ability as a player, his later career was often limited by recurring injury struggles.

== Personal life ==
Ballack's surname is of Sorbian origin. He was the only child of father Stephan, an engineer who played third-division football, and mother Karin, a secretary and swimmer.

On 14 July 2008, Ballack married his long-time girlfriend Simone Lambe. The couple had three children together: Louis (born 2001), Emilio (2002–2021), and Jordi (born 2005). The couple divorced in 2012. He dated Natacha Tannous from 2015 to 2019.

During Euro 2012, the 2014 World Cup, and Euro 2016, Ballack worked as a studio analyst for ESPN, often alongside Alexi Lalas.

His son, Emilio, died in a quad bike crash on 5 August 2021 at the age of 18.

== Career statistics ==
=== Club ===
Appearances and goals by club, season and competition
Club	Season	League			National cup (Note: Includes DFB-Pokal, FA Cup)		League cup (Note: Includes DFB-Ligapokal, Football League Cup)		Europe		Other		Total	
Club	Season	Division	Apps	Goals	Apps	Goals	Apps	Goals	Apps	Goals	Apps	Goals	Apps	Goals
Chemnitzer FC II	1994–95	Oberliga Nordost Süd	7	2	–		–		–		–		7	2
Chemnitzer FC II	1995–96	Oberliga Nordost Süd	11	3	–		–		–		–		11	3
Chemnitzer FC II	Total		18	5	0	0	0	0	0	0	0	0	18	5
Chemnitzer FC	1995–96	2. Bundesliga	15	0	1	0	–		–		–		16	0
Chemnitzer FC	1996–97	Regionalliga Nordost	34	10	1	0	–		–		–		35	10
Chemnitzer FC	Total		49	10	2	0	0	0	0	0	0	0	51	10
1. FC Kaiserslautern	1997–98	Bundesliga	16	0	2	0	–		–		–		18	0
1. FC Kaiserslautern	1998–99	Bundesliga	30	4	2	0	1	0	6 (Note: Appearances in UEFA Champions League)	0	–		39	4
1. FC Kaiserslautern	Total		46	4	4	0	1	0	6	0	0	0	57	4
Bayer Leverkusen	1999–2000	Bundesliga	23	3	0	0	0	0	2 (Note: Appearances in UEFA Cup)	2	–		25	5
Bayer Leverkusen	2000–01	Bundesliga	27	7	2	0	1	0	5	2	–		35	9
Bayer Leverkusen	2001–02	Bundesliga	29	17	4	0	1	0	16	6	–		50	23
Bayer Leverkusen	Total		79	27	6	0	2	0	23	10	0	0	110	37
Bayern Munich	2002–03	Bundesliga	26	10	5	4	0	0	7	1	–		38	15
Bayern Munich	2003–04	Bundesliga	28	7	3	2	1	2	8	0	–		40	11
Bayern Munich	2004–05	Bundesliga	27	13	4	3	2	2	9	2	–		42	20
Bayern Munich	2005–06	Bundesliga	26	14	5	1	0	0	6	1	–		37	16
Bayern Munich	Total		107	44	17	10	3	4	30	4	0	0	157	62
Chelsea	2006–07	Premier League	26	5	3	1	6	0	10	2	1 (Note: Appearance in FA Community Shield)	0	46	8
Chelsea	2007–08	Premier League	18	7	2	0	3	0	7	2	0	0	30	9
Chelsea	2008–09	Premier League	29	1	6	3	1	0	10	0	–		46	4
Chelsea	2009–10	Premier League	32	4	4	1	2	0	6	0	1	0	45	5
Chelsea	Total		105	17	15	5	12	0	33	4	2	0	167	26
Bayer Leverkusen	2010–11	Bundesliga	17	0	0	0	–		3 (Note: Appearances in UEFA Europa League)	2	–		20	2
Bayer Leverkusen	2011–12	Bundesliga	18	2	1	0	–		6	1	–		25	3
Bayer Leverkusen	Total		35	2	1	0	0	0	9	3	0	0	45	5
Career total			439	109	45	15	18	4	101	21	2	0	605	149

=== International ===
Appearances and goals by national team and year
National team	Year	Apps	Goals
Germany	1999	3	0
Germany	2000	9	0
Germany	2001	9	6
Germany	2002	11	6
Germany	2003	5	2
Germany	2004	13	8
Germany	2005	11	7
Germany	2006	14	6
Germany	2007	2	0
Germany	2008	12	4
Germany	2009	8	3
Germany	2010	1	0
Total		98	42

Scores and results list ' goal tally first, score column indicates score after each goal.

List of international goals scored by
No.	Date	Venue	Opponent	Score	Result	Competition	Ref.
1	28 March 2001	Olympic Stadium, Athens, Greece	Greece	2–1	4–2	2002 FIFA World Cup qualification	
2	2 June 2001	Helsinki Olympic Stadium, Helsinki, Finland	Finland	1–2	2–2	2002 FIFA World Cup qualification	
3	6 June 2001	Arena Kombëtare, Tirana, Albania	Albania	2–0	2–0	2002 FIFA World Cup qualification	
4	10 November 2001	Olympic Stadium, Kyiv, Ukraine	Ukraine	1–1	1–1	2002 FIFA World Cup qualification	
5	14 November 2001	Westfalenstadion, Dortmund, Germany	Ukraine	1–0	4–1	2002 FIFA World Cup qualification	
6	14 November 2001	Westfalenstadion, Dortmund, Germany	Ukraine	4–0	4–1	2002 FIFA World Cup qualification	
7	1 June 2002	Sapporo Dome, Sapporo, Japan	Saudi Arabia	3–0	8–0	2002 FIFA World Cup	
8	21 June 2002	Ulsan Munsu Football Stadium, Ulsan, South Korea	United States	1–0	1–0	2002 FIFA World Cup	
9	25 June 2002	Seoul World Cup Stadium, Seoul, South Korea	South Korea	1–0	1–0	2002 FIFA World Cup	
10	21 August 2002	Stadion Georgi Asparuhov, Sofia, Bulgaria	Bulgaria	1–1	2–2	Friendly	
11	7 September 2002	Darius and Girėnas Stadium, Kaunas, Lithuania	Lithuania	1–0	2–0	UEFA Euro 2004 qualifying	
12	16 October 2002	Niedersachsenstadion, Hanover, Germany	Faroe Islands	1–0	2–1	UEFA Euro 2004 qualifying	
13	10 September 2003	Westfalenstadion, Dortmund, Germany	Scotland	2–0	2–1	UEFA Euro 2004 qualifying	
14	11 October 2003	Volksparkstadion, Hamburg, Germany	Iceland	1–0	3–0	UEFA Euro 2004 qualifying	
15	31 March 2004	RheinEnergieStadion, Cologne, Germany	Belgium	3–0	3–0	Friendly	
16	27 May 2004	Dreisamstadion, Freiburg, Germany	Malta	1–0	7–0	Friendly	
17	27 May 2004	Dreisamstadion, Freiburg, Germany	Malta	2–0	7–0	Friendly	
18	27 May 2004	Dreisamstadion, Freiburg, Germany	Malta	5–0	7–0	Friendly	
19	27 May 2004	Dreisamstadion, Freiburg, Germany	Malta	6–0	7–0	Friendly	
20	23 June 2004	Estádio José Alvalade, Lisbon, Portugal	Czech Republic	1–0	1–2	UEFA Euro 2004	
21	16 December 2004	Nissan Stadium, Yokohama, Japan	Japan	2–0	3–0	Friendly	
22	19 December 2004	Busan Asiad Main Stadium, Busan, South Korea	South Korea	1–1	1–3	Friendly	
23	4 June 2005	Windsor Park, Belfast, Northern Ireland	Northern Ireland	2–1	4–1	Friendly	
24	4 June 2005	Windsor Park, Belfast, Northern Ireland	Northern Ireland	3–1	4–1	Friendly	
25	15 June 2005	Waldstadion, Frankfurt, Germany	Australia	3–2	4–3	2005 FIFA Confederations Cup	
26	18 June 2005	RheinEnergieStadion, Cologne, Germany	Tunisia	1–0	3–0	2005 FIFA Confederations Cup	
27	25 June 2005	Frankenstadion, Nuremberg, Germany	Brazil	2–2	2–3	2005 FIFA Confederations Cup	
28	29 June 2005	Zentralstadion, Leipzig, Germany	Mexico	4–3	4–3	2005 FIFA Confederations Cup	
29	17 August 2005	De Kuip, Rotterdam, Netherlands	Netherlands	1–2	2–2	Friendly	
30	22 March 2006	Westfalenstadion, Dortmund, Germany	United States	4–0	4–1	Friendly	
31	2 June 2006	Borussia-Park, Mönchengladbach, Germany	Colombia	1–0	3–0	Friendly	
32	6 September 2006	San Marino Stadium, Serravalle, San Marino	San Marino	3–0	13–0	UEFA Euro 2008 qualifying	
33	7 October 2006	Ostseestadion, Rostock, Germany	Georgia	2–0	2–0	Friendly	
34	11 October 2006	Tehelné pole, Bratislava, Slovakia	Slovakia	2–0	4–1	UEFA Euro 2008 qualifying	
35	15 November 2006	GSP Stadium, Strovolos, Cyprus	Cyprus	1–0	1–1	UEFA Euro 2008 qualifying	
36	31 May 2008	Veltins-Arena, Gelsenkirchen, Germany	Serbia	2–1	2–1	Friendly	
37	16 June 2008	Ernst-Happel-Stadion, Vienna, Austria	Austria	1–0	1–0	UEFA Euro 2008	
38	19 June 2008	St. Jakob-Park, Basel, Switzerland	Portugal	3–2	3–2	UEFA Euro 2008	
39	11 October 2008	Westfalenstadion, Dortmund, Germany	Russia	2–0	2–1	2010 FIFA World Cup qualification	
40	28 March 2009	Zentralstadion, Leipzig, Germany	Liechtenstein	1–0	4–0	2010 FIFA World Cup qualification	
41	1 April 2009	Millennium Stadium, Cardiff, Wales	Wales	1–0	2–0	2010 FIFA World Cup qualification	
42	9 September 2009	Niedersachsenstadion, Hanover, Germany	Azerbaijan	1–0	4–0	2010 FIFA World Cup qualification	

== Honours ==
1. FC Kaiserslautern

- Bundesliga: 1997–98

Bayer Leverkusen

- DFB-Pokal runner-up: 2001–02
- UEFA Champions League runner-up: 2001–02

Bayern Munich

- Bundesliga: 2002–03, 2004–05, 2005–06
- DFB-Pokal: 2002–03, 2004–05, 2005–06
- DFB-Ligapokal: 2004

Chelsea

- Premier League: 2009–10
- FA Cup: 2006–07, 2008–09, 2009–10
- Football League Cup: 2006–07; runner-up: 2007–08
- FA Community Shield: 2009
- UEFA Champions League runner-up: 2007–08

Germany

- FIFA World Cup runner-up: 2002; third place: 2006
- UEFA European Championship runner-up: 2008
- FIFA Confederations Cup third place: 2005

Individual

- UEFA Club Midfielder of the Year: 2002
- UEFA Team of the Year: 2002
- ESM Team of the Year: 2001–02
- Footballer of the Year (Germany): 2002, 2003, 2005; runner-up 2008
- kicker Bundesliga Team of the Season: 2001–02, 2002–03, 2004–05, 2005–06
- kicker Man of the Year (Mann des Jahres): 2002
- FIFA World Cup All-star team: 2002, 2006
- FIFA XI: 2002
- UEFA European Championship Team of the Tournament: 2004, 2008
- Bayer Leverkusen Squad of the Century
- FIFA 100
- FIFA Confederations Cup Silver Shoe Winner: 2005
- Goal of the Year (Germany): 2008
