= Eyyüp Hasan Uğur =

German-born Turkish footballer

Personal information
- Full name: Eyyüp Hasan Uğur
- Date of birth: 22 June 1977 (age 49)
- Place of birth: Dortmund, West Germany
- Height: 1.76 m (5 ft 9 in)
- Position: Midfielder

Youth career
- Borussia Dortmund
- –1995: VfL Bochum

Senior career*
Years	Team	Apps	(Gls)
1995–1997	VfL Bochum II		
1996	VfL Bochum	0	(0)
1997–1998	SpVgg Erkenschwick	33	(4)
1998–1999	Rot-Weiss Essen		
1999–2000	Gaziantepspor	21	(0)
2000–2001	Gaziantep B.B.	7	(0)
2001–2002	Denizlispor	3	(0)
2002–2005	Konyaspor	70	(6)
2005	Gençlerbirliği	12	(0)
2006–2007	Çaykur Rizespor	48	(4)
2007–2008	Antalyaspor	18	(0)
2008	Sakaryaspor	13	(1)
2009	Kocaelispor	10	(0)
2009–2011	Altay	40	(0)
2012	KFC Uerdingen 05	6	(0)
- * Club domestic league appearances and goals as of 30 June 2012

Eyyüp Hasan Uğur (born 22 June 1977) is a retired German-born Turkish football midfielder.

== Career ==
As of 30 June 2012

=== Statistics ===
Club performance			League		Cup		Total	
Season	Club	League	Apps	Goals	Apps	Goals	Apps	Goals
Germany			League		DFB-Pokal		Total	
1995–96	VfL Bochum II	Verbandsliga Westfalen			—			
1996–97	VfL Bochum II	Verbandsliga Westfalen			—			
1995–96	VfL Bochum	2. Bundesliga	0	0	0	0	0	0
1997–98	SpVgg Erkenschwick	Regionalliga West/Südwest	33	4	—		33	4
1998–99	Rot-Weiss Essen	Oberliga Nordrhein			—			
Turkey			League		Turkish Cup		Total	
1999–00	Gaziantepspor	1.Lig	21	0	1	0	22	0
2000-01	Gaziantep B.B.	2.Lig	7	0	2	0	9	0
2001-02	Denizlispor	Süper Lig	3	0	0	0	3	0
2002-03	Konyaspor	First League	27	4	3	0	30	4
2003-04	Konyaspor	Süper Lig	14	0	1	0	15	0
2004-05	Konyaspor	Süper Lig	29	2	3	0	32	2
2005-06	Gençlerbirliği	Süper Lig	12	0	1	0	13	0
2005-06	Çaykur Rizespor	Süper Lig	16	1	0	0	16	1
2006-07	Çaykur Rizespor	Süper Lig	32	3	3	0	35	3
2007-08	Antalyaspor	First League	18	0	1	0	19	0
2008-09	Sakaryaspor	First League	13	1	1	0	14	1
2008-09	Kocaelispor	Süper Lig	10	0	0	0	10	0
2009-10	Altay	First League	28	0	3	0	31	0
2010-11	Altay	First League	12	0	0	0	12	0
Germany			League		DFB-Pokal		Total	
2011–12	KFC Uerdingen 05	NRW-Liga	6	0	—		6	0
Total	Germany				0	0		
Total	Turkey		242	11	19	0	261	11
Career total					19	0		
