= Mirko Reichel =

German footballer

Personal information
- Date of birth: 2 December 1970 (age 55)
- Place of birth: Stollberg, East Germany
- Height: 1.81 m (5 ft 11 in)
- Position: Midfielder

Youth career
- 1977–1985: FC Stollberg
- 1985–1989: Wismut Aue

Senior career*
Years	Team	Apps	(Gls)
1989–1992	Wismut Aue		
1992–1993	SpVgg Weiden	17	(6)
1993–1994	Erzgebirge Aue		
1994–1997	Waldhof Mannheim	84	(19)
1997–1998	VfL Bochum	9	(0)
1998–2005	Greuther Fürth	194	(23)
2005–2007	Greuther Fürth II	54	(7)

Managerial career
- 2007–2008: Greuther Fürth U17
- 2008: Erzgebirge Aue (assistant)
- 2008–: Greuther Fürth (assistant)
- * Club domestic league appearances and goals

Mirko Reichel (born 2 December 1970) is a German former professional footballer who played as a midfielder.

== Career statistics ==
Appearances and goals by club, season and competition
Club	Season	League			National cup		League cup		Continental		Total	
Club	Season	Division	Apps	Goals	Apps	Goals	Apps	Goals	Apps	Goals	Apps	Goals
Wismut Aue	1989–90	DDR-Oberliga	5	0			—		—			
Wismut Aue	1990–91	DDR-Liga	21	4			—		—			
Wismut Aue	1991–92	NOFV-Oberliga					—		—			
Wismut Aue	Total						0	0	0	0		
SpVgg Weiden	1992–93	Oberliga Bayern	17	6	—		—		—		17	6
Erzgebirge Aue	1993–94	NOFV-Oberliga			—		—		—			
Waldhof Mannheim	1994–95	2. Bundesliga	31	3	2	1	—		—		33	4
Waldhof Mannheim	1995–96	2. Bundesliga	26	7	3	1	—		—		29	8
Waldhof Mannheim	1995–96	2. Bundesliga	27	9	2	0	—		—		29	9
Waldhof Mannheim	Total		84	19	7	2	0	0	0	0	91	21
VfL Bochum	1997–98	Bundesliga	9	0	1	0	0	0	4	0	14	0
Greuther Fürth	1998–99	2. Bundesliga	33	3	2	0	—		—		35	3
Greuther Fürth	1999–00	2. Bundesliga	31	6	3	0	—		—		34	6
Greuther Fürth	2000–01	2. Bundesliga	27	4	2	0	—		—		29	4
Greuther Fürth	2001–02	2. Bundesliga	33	3	2	0	—		—		35	3
Greuther Fürth	2002–03	2. Bundesliga	32	2	1	0	—		—		33	2
Greuther Fürth	2003–04	2. Bundesliga	21	3	1	0	—		—		22	3
Greuther Fürth	2004–05	2. Bundesliga	17	2	2	0	—		—		19	2
Greuther Fürth	Total		194	23	13	0	0	0	0	0	207	23
Greuther Fürth II	2005–06	Oberliga Bayern	25	7	—		—		—		25	7
Greuther Fürth II	2006–07	Oberliga Bayern	29	0	—		—		—		29	0
Greuther Fürth II	Total		54	7	0	0	0	0	0	0	54	7
Career total							0	0	4	0		
