= Uwe Gospodarek =

German footballer

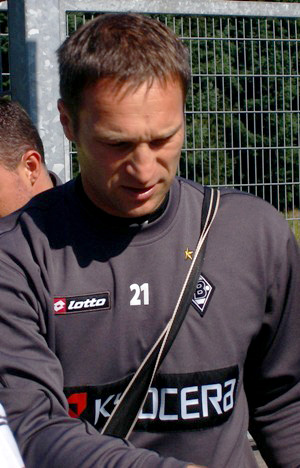
- Gospodarek with Borussia M'gladbach in 2008

Personal information
- Date of birth: 6 August 1973 (age 53)
- Place of birth: Straubing, West Germany
- Height: 1.81 m (5 ft 11 in)
- Position: Goalkeeper

Team information
- Current team: Al Shabab (goalkeeper coach)

Youth career
- 1982–1988: SV Ascha
- 1988–1989: Jahn Regensburg
- 1989–1991: Bayern Munich

Senior career*
Years	Team	Apps	(Gls)
1991–1995	Bayern Munich II	64	(0)
1991–1995	Bayern Munich	7	(0)
1995–1998	VfL Bochum	82	(0)
1998–2001	1. FC Kaiserslautern	8	(0)
2002–2003	Jahn Regensburg	51	(0)
2003–2007	Wacker Burghausen	122	(0)
2007–2009	Borussia M'gladbach	8	(0)
2009–2010	Hannover 96	0	(0)
Total		342	(0)

International career
1993–1996	Germany U21	18	(0)
- * Club domestic league appearances and goals

Uwe Gospodarek (born 6 August 1973) is a German football coach and former player who played as a goalkeeper. He works as goalkeeper coach for Al Shabab.

== Football career ==
Gospodarek started playing professionally with FC Bayern Munich, but would only manage seven first team appearances during four seasons, being barred by two internationals: first Raimond Aumann, then Oliver Kahn.

Afterwards, he moved to VfL Bochum, helping it move straight from the second division into the UEFA Cup, as he only missed two league matches combined.

After an unassuming stint with 1. FC Kaiserslautern, Gospodarek resumed his career in the regional leagues, with SSV Jahn Regensburg, joining modest second-tier outfit SV Wacker Burghausen in 2003–04. In 2007, he moved to Borussia Mönchengladbach, being released midway through his second season and retired in July 2009, joining former side Wacker Burghausen as goalkeepers' coach.

On 20 December 2009, Gospodarek announced his comeback to active football joining Hannover 96, where he filled the vacant place after the death of Robert Enke. He retired at the end of the 2009–10 campaign, without any appearances.

== After retirement ==
On 8 August 2010, Gospodarek was appointed as the new goalkeeper coach of Germany U21 national team. He left this post in October 2013, and was replaced by Klaus Thomforde.

In July 2012, Gospodarek got the job as youth goalkeeper coach at Bayern Munich. Having worked for VfB Stuttgart since 2019, he signed with 1. FC Köln in the summer of 2021.

== Career statistics ==
Appearances and goals by club, season and competition
Club	Season	League			National cup		League cup		Europe		Other		Total	
Club	Season	Division	Apps	Goals	Apps	Goals	Apps	Goals	Apps	Goals	Apps	Goals	Apps	Goals
Bayern Munich II	1991–92	Oberliga Bayern	1	0	—		—		—		—		1	0
Bayern Munich II	1992–93	Oberliga Bayern	17	0	—		—		—		—		17	0
Bayern Munich II	1993–94	Oberliga Bayern	21	0	4	0	—		—		—		25	0
Bayern Munich II	1994–95	Oberliga Bayern	24	0	4	0	—		—		—		28	0
Bayern Munich II	Total		63	0	8	0	—		—		—		71	0
Bayern Munich	1991–92	Bundesliga	1	0	0	0	—		—		—		1	0
Bayern Munich	1992–93	Bundesliga	2	0	0	0	—		—		—		2	0
Bayern Munich	1993–94	Bundesliga	2	0	0	0	—		0	0	—		2	0
Bayern Munich	1994–95	Bundesliga	2	0	0	0	—		2	0	0	0	4	0
Bayern Munich	Total		7	0	0	0	—		2	0	0	0	9	0
VfL Bochum	1995–96	2. Bundesliga	33	0	1	0	—		—		—		34	0
VfL Bochum	1996–97	Bundesliga	33	0	4	0	—		—		—		37	0
VfL Bochum	1997–98	Bundesliga	16	0	2	0	1	0	5	0	—		34	0
VfL Bochum	Total		82	0	7	0	1	0	5	0	—		95	0
1. FC Kaiserslautern	1998–99	Bundesliga	0	0	0	0	0	0	0	0	—		0	0
1. FC Kaiserslautern	1999–2000	Bundesliga	8	0	0	0	0	0	0	0	—		8	0
1. FC Kaiserslautern	2000–01	Bundesliga	0	0	1	0	0	0	0	0	—		1	0
1. FC Kaiserslautern	Total		8	0	1	0	0	0	0	0	—		9	0
Jahn Regensburg	2001–02	Regionalliga Süd	17	0	—		—		—		—		17	0
Jahn Regensburg	2002–03	Regionalliga Süd	34	0	1	0	—		—		—		35	0
Jahn Regensburg	Total		51	0	1	0	—		—		—		52	0
Wacker Burghausen	2003–04	2. Bundesliga	24	0	0	0	—		—		—		24	0
Wacker Burghausen	2004–05	2. Bundesliga	34	0	1	0	—		—		—		35	0
Wacker Burghausen	2005–06	2. Bundesliga	34	0	1	0	—		—		—		35	0
Wacker Burghausen	2006–07	2. Bundesliga	30	0	3	0	—		—		—		33	0
Wacker Burghausen	Total		122	0	5	0	—		—		—		127	0
Borussia Mönchengladbach	2007–08	2. Bundesliga	1	0	0	0	—		—		—		1	0
Borussia Mönchengladbach	2008–09	Bundesliga	7	0	0	0	—		—		—		7	0
Borussia Mönchengladbach	Total		8	0	0	0	—		—		—		8	0
Hannover 96	2009–10	2. Bundesliga	0	0	—		—		—		—		0	0
Career total			341	0	22	0	1	0	7	0	0	0	371	0

== Honours ==
- Bundesliga: 1993–94
