= Kai Michalke =

German footballer (born 1976)

Personal information
- Date of birth: 5 April 1976 (age 50)
- Place of birth: Bochum, West Germany
- Height: 1.78 m (5 ft 10 in)
- Positions: Forward; left winger

Team information
- Current team: SV 1910 Breinig (Manager)

Youth career
- –1989: SG Werne
- 1989–1993: VfL Bochum

Senior career*
Years	Team	Apps	(Gls)
1993–1999	VfL Bochum	131	(21)
1999–2001	Hertha BSC	22	(3)
2001–2003	1. FC Nürnberg	43	(4)
2003–2005	Alemannia Aachen	55	(14)
2005–2006	MSV Duisburg	6	(0)
2006–2008	Heracles Almelo	23	(0)
2009	SG Wattenscheid 09	0	(0)
Total		280	(42)

International career
- Germany U16
1991	Germany U17	3	(0)
1994	Germany U18	1	(0)
1996–1998	Germany U21	17	(6)
1999–2000	Germany B	4	(0)

Managerial career
- 2009: SG Wattenscheid 09 U17
- 2010: SV 1910 Breinig
- * Club domestic league appearances and goals

Kai Michalke (born 5 April 1976) is a German former professional footballer who played as a forward or left winger.

== Career statistics ==
Appearances and goals by club, season and competition
Club	Season	League			National cup		League cup		Continental		Total	
Club	Season	Division	Apps	Goals	Apps	Goals	Apps	Goals	Apps	Goals	Apps	Goals
VfL Bochum	1993–94	2. Bundesliga	12	2	0	0	–		–		12	2
VfL Bochum	1994–95	Bundesliga	24	2	1	0	–		–		25	2
VfL Bochum	1995–96	2. Bundesliga	32	8	1	0	–		–		33	8
VfL Bochum	1996–97	Bundesliga	25	4	0	0	–		–		25	4
VfL Bochum	1997–98	Bundesliga	26	4	2	0	0	0	2	0	30	4
VfL Bochum	1998–99	Bundesliga	12	1	1	1	–		–		13	2
VfL Bochum	Total		131	21	5	1	0	0	2	0	138	22
Hertha BSC	1999–00	Bundesliga	18	1	2	0	0	0	10	1	30	2
Hertha BSC	2000–01	Bundesliga	4	2	2	0	2	1	1	0	9	3
Hertha BSC	Total		22	3	4	0	2	1	11	1	39	5
1. FC Nürnberg	2001–02	Bundesliga	28	4	0	0	–		–		28	4
1. FC Nürnberg	2002–03	Bundesliga	15	0	0	0	–		–		15	0
1. FC Nürnberg	Total		43	4	0	0	0	0	0	0	43	0
Alemannia Aachen	2003–04	2. Bundesliga	27	3	4	2	–		–		31	5
Alemannia Aachen	2004–05	2. Bundesliga	28	11	2	0	–		8	2	38	13
Alemannia Aachen	Total		55	14	6	2	0	0	8	2	69	18
MSV Duisburg	2005–06	Bundesliga	6	0	1	0	–		–		7	0
Heracles Almelo	2006–07	Eredivisie	2	0	0	0	–		–		2	0
Heracles Almelo	2007–08	Eredivisie	21	0	1	0	–		–		22	0
Heracles Almelo	Total		23	0	1	0	0	0	0	0	24	0
SG Wattenscheid 09	2009–10	Oberliga	0	0	–		–		–		0	0
Career total			280	42	17	3	2	1	21	3	320	49

== Honours ==
Germany U16

- UEFA European Under-16 Football Championship: 1992
