= Henryk Bałuszyński =

Polish footballer (1972–2012)

Personal information
- Full name: Henryk Edward Bałuszyński
- Date of birth: 15 July 1972
- Place of birth: Knurów, Poland
- Date of death: 1 March 2012 (aged 39)
- Height: 1.84 m (6 ft 0 in)
- Position: Striker

Youth career
- Gwiazda Chudów
- 1988–1989: Górnik Zabrze
- 1989–1990: Górnik Knurów

Senior career*
Years	Team	Apps	(Gls)
1990–1994	Górnik Zabrze	109	(18)
1994–2001	VfL Bochum	97	(17)
1998–1999	→ Arminia Bielefeld (loan)	22	(2)
2001	LR Ahlen	12	(3)
2002	SV Babelsberg 03	15	(2)
2002–2003	Enosis Neon Paralimni	3	(0)
2003–2004	Piast Gliwice	10	(0)
2003–2004	Koszarawa Żywiec		
2004–2007	Gwarek Ornontowice		
2007–2010	Gwiazda Chudów		

International career
1994–1997	Poland	15	(4)

Managerial career
- 2004–2007: Gwarek Ornontowice (player-manager)
- 2007–2012: Gwiazda Chudów (player-manager)
- * Club domestic league appearances and goals

Henryk Bałuszyński (15 July 1972 – 1 March 2012) was a Polish professional footballer who played as a striker.

== Career ==
Bałuszyński was born in Knurów. He scored four goals for the Poland national team in fifteen appearances. On 1 March 2012, he died of a heart attack.

=== Statistics ===
Club performance			League		Cup		League Cup		Continental		Total	
Season	Club	League	Apps	Goals	Apps	Goals	Apps	Goals	Apps	Goals	Apps	Goals
Poland			League		Polish Cup		Ekstraklasa Cup		Europe		Total	
1990–91	Górnik Zabrze	Ekstraklasa	12	0			—		—			
1991–92	Górnik Zabrze	Ekstraklasa	31	4			—		2	0		
1992–93	Górnik Zabrze	Ekstraklasa	26	2			—		—			
1993–94	Górnik Zabrze	Ekstraklasa	31	7			—		—			
1994–95	Górnik Zabrze	Ekstraklasa	9	5			—		2	1		
Germany			League		DFB-Pokal		DFB-Ligapokal		Europe		Total	
1994–95	VfL Bochum	Bundesliga	10	4	0	0	—		—		10	4
1995–96	VfL Bochum	2. Bundesliga	28	8	1	0	—		—		29	8
1996–97	VfL Bochum	Bundesliga	23	1	4	1	—		—		27	2
1997–98	VfL Bochum	Bundesliga	12	1	2	0	0	0	4	1	18	2
1998–99	Arminia Bielefeld	2. Bundesliga	22	2	1	0	—		—		23	2
1999–00	VfL Bochum	2. Bundesliga	13	3	1	1	—		—		14	4
2000–01	VfL Bochum	Bundesliga	11	0	1	0	—		—		12	0
2001–02	LR Ahlen	2. Bundesliga	11	3	1	0	—		—		12	3
2001–02	SV Babelsberg 03	2. Bundesliga	15	2	0	0	—		—		15	2
Cyprus			League		Cypriot Cup		League Cup		Europe		Total	
2002–03	Enosis Neon Paralimni	First Division	3	0			—					
Poland			League		Polish Cup		Ekstraklasa Cup		Europe		Total	
2003–04	Piast Gliwice	II liga	10	0			—		—			
2003–04	Koszarawa Żywiec	IV liga					—		—			
2004–05	Gwarek Ornontowice	Liga okręgowa					—		—			
2005–06	Gwarek Ornontowice	Liga okręgowa					—		—			
2006–07	Gwarek Ornontowice	Liga okręgowa					—		—			
2007–08	Gwiazda Chudów	Klasa A					—		—			
2008–09	Gwiazda Chudów	Klasa A			—		—		—			
2009–10	Gwiazda Chudów	Klasa A					—		—			
2010–11	Gwiazda Chudów	Klasa A					—		—			
Total	Poland						0	0	4	1		
Total	Germany		145	24	11	2	0	0	4	1	160	27
Total	Cyprus		3	0			0	0				
Career total							0	0				
