= Mathias Jack =

German footballer (born 1969)

Personal information
- Date of birth: 15 February 1969 (age 57)
- Place of birth: Leipzig, East Germany
- Height: 1.91 m (6 ft 3 in)
- Position: Defender

Youth career
- Lokomotive Leipzig
- –1986: BSG Chemie Leipzig

Senior career*
Years	Team	Apps	(Gls)
1986–1990	BSG Chemie Leipzig	41	(1)
1990–1991	Wismut Aue	38	(0)
1991–1993	VfB Oldenburg	55	(2)
1993–1995	Rot-Weiss Essen	64	(3)
1995–1997	VfL Bochum	56	(2)
1997–1999	Fortuna Düsseldorf	36	(1)
1999–2003	Hibernian	109	(4)
2003	Grindavík	8	(0)
2003	Raith Rovers	6	(0)
2004–2005	Sachsen Leipzig	28	(3)
2005–2006	Grindavík	14	(0)
2006–2008	SV Meppen	49	(5)
2008–2009	DJK Amisia Rheine		

Managerial career
- 2008–2009: DJK Amisia Rheine
- 2013–2018: Fortuna Düsseldorf II (assistant)
- 2015: Fortuna Düsseldorf II (caretaker)
- * Club domestic league appearances and goals

Mathias Jack (born 15 February 1969) is a German football manager and former player who played primarily as a defender.

== Playing career ==
Born in Leipzig, Jack began his career with Wismut Aue before moving to VfB Oldenburg in 1991. Following two years with them, Jack had a similar length of spell with Rot-Weiss Essen. Jack played for Essen in the 1994 German Cup Final. He then had spells with VfL Bochum and Fortuna Düsseldorf.

Jack moved to Scottish side Hibernian in 1999, going on to make over 100 appearances for the Easter Road side. He played for Hibs in the 2001 Scottish Cup Final, a 3–0 defeat by Celtic. Following his departure in the summer of 2003, Jack had a short spell with Raith Rovers in November before returning to his hometown with Sachsen Leipzig. In 2005, Jack moved abroad again to Icelandic side Grindavik before returning to Germany in 2006 with SV Meppen.

Jack joined DJK Amisia Rheine in January 2008, initially signing a contract until the end of the season.

== Coaching career ==
Jack was Taşkın Aksoy's assistant manager at Fortuna Düsseldorf II. He became caretaker manager of the side when Aksoy became caretaker manager of the club's first team.

== Career statistics ==
Appearances and goals by club, season and competition
Club	Season	League			National Cup		League Cup		Europe		Total	
Club	Season	Division	Apps	Goals	Apps	Goals	Apps	Goals	Apps	Goals	Apps	Goals
BSG Chemie Leipzig	1986–87	DDR-Liga	6	0	1	0	–		–		7	0
BSG Chemie Leipzig	1987–88	DDR-Liga	15	1	0	0	–		–		15	1
BSG Chemie Leipzig	1988–89	DDR-Liga	21	0	0	0	–		–		21	0
BSG Chemie Leipzig	Total		42	1	1	0	0	0	0	0	43	1
Wismut Aue	1989–90	DDR-Oberliga	12	1	1	0	–		–		13	1
Wismut Aue	1990–91	DDR-Liga	26	0	1	0	–		–		27	0
Wismut Aue	Total		38	1	2	0	0	0	0	0	40	1
VfB Oldenburg	1991–92	2. Bundesliga	26	2	2	0	–		–		28	2
VfB Oldenburg	1992–93	2. Bundesliga	29	0	0	0	–		–		29	0
VfB Oldenburg	Total		54	2	2	0	0	0	0	0	56	2
Rot-Weiss Essen	1993–94	2. Bundesliga	33	1	6	0	–		–		39	1
Rot-Weiss Essen	1994–95	Regionalliga West/Südwest	31	2	0	0	–		–		31	2
Rot-Weiss Essen	Total		64	3	6	0	0	0	0	0	70	3
VfL Bochum	1995–96	2. Bundesliga	27	1	1	0	–		–		28	1
VfL Bochum	1996–97	Bundesliga	29	1	2	0	–		–		31	1
VfL Bochum	Total		56	2	3	0	0	0	0	0	59	2
Fortuna Düsseldorf	1997–98	2. Bundesliga	23	1	0	0	–		–		23	1
Fortuna Düsseldorf	1998–99	2. Bundesliga	13	0	1	0	–		–		14	0
Fortuna Düsseldorf	Total		36	1	1	0	0	0	0	0	37	1
Hibernian	1999–2000	Scottish Premier League	22	1	2	0	2	0	–		26	1
Hibernian	2000–01	Scottish Premier League	37	0	4	1	2	0	–		43	1
Hibernian	2001–02	Scottish Premier League	31	0	2	0	1	0	2	0	36	0
Hibernian	2002–03	Scottish Premier League	19	3	2	0	0	0	–		21	3
Hibernian	Total		109	4	10	1	5	0	2	0	126	5
Grindavík	2003	Úrvalsdeild	8	0					2	0		
Raith Rovers	2003–04	Scottish First Division	6	0					–			
FC Sachsen Leipzig	2004–05	NOFV-Oberliga Süd	28	3	–		–		–		28	3
Grindavík	2005	Úrvalsdeild										
Grindavík	2006	Úrvalsdeild										
Grindavík	Total											
SV Meppen	2006–07	Oberliga Nord	34	2	–		–		–		34	2
SV Meppen	2007–08	Oberliga Nord	15	3	–		–		–		15	3
SV Meppen	Total		49	5	0	0	0	0	0	0	49	5
DJK Amisia Rheine	2008–09				–		–		–			
Career total												
