= Norbert Hofmann (footballer, born 1972) =

German footballer

Personal information
- Full name: Norbert Hofmann
- Date of birth: 1 January 1972 (age 54)
- Place of birth: Mannheim, West Germany
- Height: 1.74 m (5 ft 9 in)
- Position: Midfielder

Youth career
- –1989: TSV Schönau
- 1989–1990: SV Waldhof Mannheim

Senior career*
Years	Team	Apps	(Gls)
1990–1997	SV Waldhof Mannheim	229	(20)
1997–1999	VfL Bochum	58	(3)
1999–2002	1. FC Saarbrücken	39	(2)
2002–2004	TSG 1899 Hoffenheim	6	(0)
2004–2005	TSG 1899 Hoffenheim II	16	(2)
2005–2007	FSV Oggersheim	40	(5)
Total		388	(32)
- * Club domestic league appearances and goals

Norbert Hofmann (born 1 January 1972 in Mannheim) is a retired German football midfielder.
