= Thomas Reis =

German footballer and manager

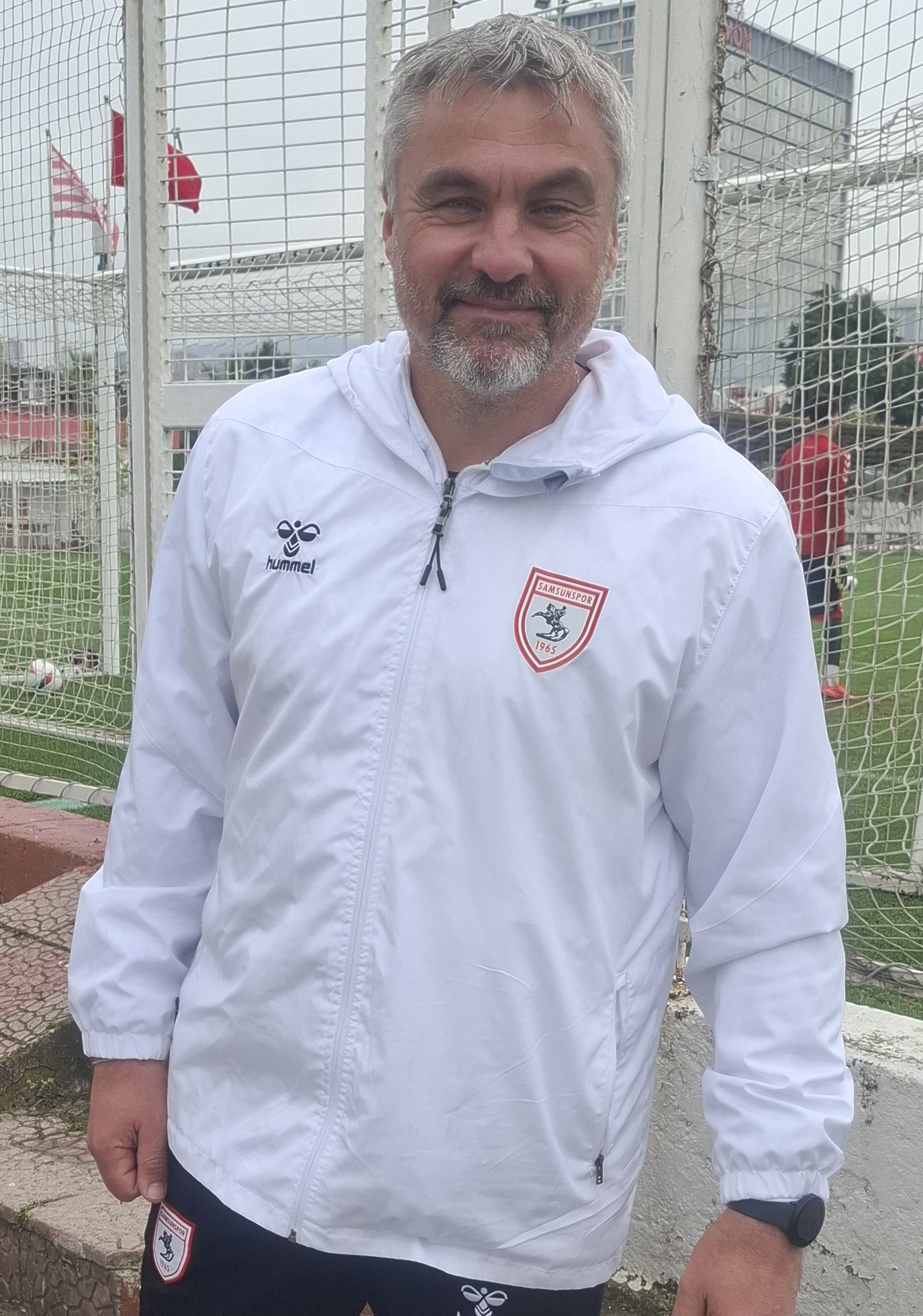
- Reis with Samsunspor in 2025

Personal information
- Full name: Thomas Reis
- Date of birth: 4 October 1973 (age 53)
- Place of birth: Wertheim, West Germany
- Height: 1.83 m (6 ft 0 in)
- Positions: Defender; midfielder

Team information
- Current team: Trabzonspor (head coach)

Youth career
- –1989: FC Wertheim-Eichel
- 1989–1990: VfB Stuttgart
- 1990–1992: Eintracht Frankfurt

Senior career*
Years	Team	Apps	(Gls)
1992–1995	Eintracht Frankfurt	16	(2)
1995–2003	VfL Bochum	176	(16)
2002–2003	VfL Bochum II	1	(1)
2003–2004	FC Augsburg	27	(3)
2004–2005	Eintracht Trier	23	(1)
2005–2006	Waldhof Mannheim	4	(1)
Total		247	(24)

International career
1993–1995	Germany U-21	7	(0)

Managerial career
- 2011: VfL Bochum (women)
- 2014–2015: VfL Bochum II
- 2019–2022: VfL Bochum
- 2022–2023: Schalke 04
- 2024–2026: Samsunspor
- 2026: Ludogorets Razgrad
- 2026–: Trabzonspor
- * Club domestic league appearances and goals

Thomas Reis (German pronunciation: [ˈtoːmas ˈʁaɪs], born 4 October 1973) is a German football manager and former professional player. He is currently the head coach of Turkish Süper Lig club Trabzonspor.

As a player, he began his career at Wertheim-Eichel and later played for clubs like VfB Stuttgart, Eintracht Frankfurt, and VfL Bochum, primarily in defensive and midfield roles. His career highlights include helping Bochum achieve Bundesliga promotion and playing for Germany U-21. After retiring, he transitioned to coaching, starting with Bochum’s youth department and eventually managing the senior team. Reis gained prominence for his tactical acumen, notably leading Bochum to Bundesliga promotion in 2021. Later stints included managing Schalke 04 and in 2024, heading Turkish club Samsunspor.

== Club career ==
Reis began his football career as a youth player with his hometown club FC Wertheim-Eichel, later joining VfB Stuttgart, where he reached the final of the B-Youth Championship in the 1989–90 season. He even scored Stuttgart’s only goal in a 1–2 loss against 1. FC Köln. He then progressed to Eintracht Frankfurt, where his professional journey took off.

In the 1992–93 season, Reis joined the professional squad of Eintracht Frankfurt and made his Bundesliga debut on 4 October 1992, in a 4–0 victory against his former club, VfB Stuttgart. Substituted in the 83rd minute for Axel Kruse, Reis showcased his potential. During this time, from 1993 to 1995, he also played for the German U-21 national team. However, he struggled to secure a starting position in Frankfurt, managing only 16 Bundesliga appearances over three years.

In 1995, Reis moved to VfL Bochum in the 2. Bundesliga. His first season was a massive success, with VfL Bochum earning promotion to the Bundesliga, thanks in part to Reis’s 31 appearances. The following year saw VfL Bochum achieve an impressive 5th place in the Bundesliga, with Reis playing every single match of the season.

Although Bochum initially enjoyed top-tier success, they faced relegation in 1999 and 2001, with Reis still a vital part of the team. However, they also managed to bounce back, celebrating promotion in 2000 and 2002. After yet another Bundesliga season in 2002–03, Reis left Bochum, marking the end of an era.

Reis joined FC Augsburg in the Regionalliga Süd for the 2003–04 season, narrowly missing promotion with a 4th place finish after 27 appearances and 3 goals. Seeking new challenges, he moved to Eintracht Trier in the 2. Bundesliga, but his fortunes declined as Eintracht Trier was relegated due to a goal difference just one goal worse than Energie Cottbus on the 14th spot.

In the 2005–06 season, Reis signed with SV Waldhof Mannheim in the Oberliga Baden-Württemberg. However, his impact was limited, with just four appearances and one goal, signaling the twilight of his playing career.

== Managerial career ==
=== Early career ===
Reis began his managerial career at VfL Bochum in 2009, working in the club’s youth department. He initially served as a scout before taking on roles as a coach and assistant to the head of the youth program. In February 2012, he transitioned to the first team as an assistant coach under Karsten Neitzel, a position he held until 9 April 2013.

Following his time with the first team, Reis took charge of the U-19 team and, in January 2014, became the head coach of the U-23 squad. By January 2015, he returned to the senior team as an assistant coach. On March 30, 2015, he earned the DFB Football Coaching License, solidifying his qualifications as a top-level coach.

On 6 September 2019, After previously serving as the women’s team and as the academy’s head coach, Reis was appointed manager of VfL Bochum marking the beginning of his tenure in senior management. Under his leadership, the team displayed resilience and a clear tactical structure, which eventually led to their promotion to the Bundesliga in the 2020–21 season after an 11 year absence from Germany’s top flight. His managerial style emphasized disciplined defensive organization combined with quick transitions, earning him recognition as a tactically astute coach.

Reis continued to guide VfL Bochum through their return to the Bundesliga, ensuring competitive performances against established top-tier teams. His ability to motivate players and adapt strategies during challenging periods became a defining aspect of his managerial career.

After leading VfL Bochum to the Bundesliga, Reis faced a challenging 2022–23 season. The team endured their worst start in Bundesliga history, losing their first six matches and struggling at both ends of the pitch. Despite his efforts to turn things around, results did not improve, and Bochum remained at the bottom of the table. In September 2022, the club decided to part ways with Reis, ending a tenure that had seen both great success and significant challenges.

In October 2022, Reis was appointed as manager of Bundesliga strugglers Schalke 04. After four defeats in the first seven games of the 2023–24 2. Bundesliga season, he was dismissed on 27 September 2023.

=== Samsunspor ===
On 12 June 2024, Reis has been the head coach of Süper Lig club Samsunspor, succeeding Markus Gisdol. In his first season with Samsunspor, Reis achieved significant success, guiding the team to a strong performance in the first half of the league. Samsunspor finished the first half of the 2024–25 Süper Lig season in 3rd place, demonstrating solid form and positioning themselves as one of the top teams in the league. Despite facing a transfer ban during the 2024–25 season, the team remarkably finished third in the Süper Lig, securing qualification for the UEFA Europa League for the first time in the club’s history. As a result, Samsunspor will compete in the Europa League play-off round in the 2025–26 season.

=== Ludogorets Razgrad ===
On 14 July 2026, Reis was appointed as head coach of Bulgarian First League club Ludogorets Razgrad.

=== Trabzonspor ===
On 17 September 2026, Reis was appointed as head coach of Trabzonspor. In his first match with the club on 19 September, Trabzonspor defeated defending champions Galatasaray 4–0 in a Süper Lig match.

== Career statistics ==
Appearances and goals by club, season and competition
Club	Season	League			DFB-Pokal		Europe		Total	
Club	Season	Division	Apps	Goals	Apps	Goals	Apps	Goals	Apps	Goals
Eintracht Frankfurt	1992–93	Bundesliga	3	0	0	0	0	0	3	0
Eintracht Frankfurt	1993–94	Bundesliga	9	1	0	0	1	0	10	1
Eintracht Frankfurt	1994–95	Bundesliga	4	1	0	0	0	0	4	1
Eintracht Frankfurt	Total		16	2	0	0	1	0	17	2
VfL Bochum	1995–96	2. Bundesliga	31	1	1	0	—		32	1
VfL Bochum	1996–97	Bundesliga	34	2	3	0	—		37	2
VfL Bochum	1997–98	Bundesliga	23	1	2	0	5	1	31	2
VfL Bochum	1998–99	Bundesliga	25	5	2	2	—		27	7
VfL Bochum	1999–00	2. Bundesliga	18	0	4	1	—		22	1
VfL Bochum	2000–01	Bundesliga	12	3	0	0	—		12	3
VfL Bochum	2001–02	2. Bundesliga	15	3	1	0	—		16	3
VfL Bochum	2002–03	Bundesliga	18	1	2	0	—		20	1
VfL Bochum	Total		176	16	15	3	5	1	197	20
VfL Bochum II	2002–03	Oberliga Westfalen	1	1	—		—		1	1
FC Augsburg	2003–04	Regionalliga Süd	27	3	—		—		27	3
Eintracht Trier	2004–05	2. Bundesliga	23	1	—		—		27	3
Waldhof Mannheim	2005–06	Oberliga BW	4	1	—		—		4	1
Career total			247	24	15	3	6	1	269	28

== Managerial statistics ==
As of 22 November 2026

Managerial record by team and tenure
Team	Nat	From	To	Record								Ref
Team	Nat	From	To	G	W	D	L	GF	GA	GD	Win %	Ref
VfL Bochum II	(Germany)	27 January 2014	6 January 2015	35	6	12	17	40	51	−11	17.14	
VfL Bochum	(Germany)	6 September 2019	12 September 2022	112	48	23	41	170	163	+7	42.86	
Schalke 04	(Germany)	27 October 2022	27 September 2023	31	9	8	14	39	61	−22	29.03	
Samsunspor	(Turkey)	12 June 2024	14 February 2026	72	32	19	21	103	85	+18	44.44	
Ludogorets Razgrad	(Bulgaria)	12 July 2026	16 September 2026	11	7	3	1	18	10	+8	63.64	
Trabzonspor	(Turkey)	17 September 2026	present	10	9	0	1	24	6	+18	90.00	
Total				271	111	65	95	394	376	+18	40.96	—

== Honours ==
=== Player ===
VfL Bochum

- 2. Bundesliga: 1995–96

=== Manager ===
VfL Bochum

- 2. Bundesliga: 2020–21
