= Yves Gaugler =

German footballer

Personal information
- Full name: Yves Gaugler
- Date of birth: 10 June 1969 (age 57)
- Height: 1.85 m (6 ft 1 in)
- Position: Forward

Senior career*
Years	Team	Apps	(Gls)
1995–1996	VfL Bochum	11	(1)
1996–1997	Eintracht Trier	24	(3)
- * Club domestic league appearances and goals

Yves Gaugler (born 10 June 1969) is a retired German football forward.
