= Daniel Jurgeleit =

German footballer

Personal information
- Full name: Daniel Jurgeleit
- Date of birth: 15 December 1963 (age 62)
- Place of birth: Ratingen, West Germany
- Height: 1.83 m (6 ft 0 in)
- Positions: Midfielder; forward

Youth career
- Fortuna Düsseldorf

Senior career*
Years	Team	Apps	(Gls)
1982–1988	Union Solingen	193	(59)
1988–1993	FC Homburg	162	(38)
1993–1994	SpVgg Unterhaching		
1994–1997	VfB Lübeck	94	(39)
1997–1999	Eintracht Braunschweig	40	(15)
1999–2003	Holstein Kiel	107	(47)

Managerial career
- 2008–2009: VfR Horst
- 2010: FC Elmshorn
- 2010–2020: ETSV Weiche Flensburg
- * Club domestic league appearances and goals

Daniel Jurgeleit (born 15 December 1963) is a German former footballer.
