= Thomas Stickroth =

German footballer (born 1965)

Personal information
- Date of birth: 13 April 1965 (age 61)
- Place of birth: Stuttgart, West Germany
- Positions: Defender; midfielder

Youth career
- –1983: VfB Stuttgart

Senior career*
Years	Team	Apps	(Gls)
1983–1986	SC Freiburg	90	(13)
1986–1988	FC Homburg	49	(6)
1988–1990	Bayer Uerdingen	36	(2)
1990	→ St Mirren (loan)	5	(0)
1990–1992	St Mirren	48	(2)
1992–1995	1. FC Saarbrücken	96	(16)
1995–2002	VfL Bochum	120	(7)
Total		444	(46)

Managerial career
- 2018: FC Vaduz (caretaker manager)
- * Club domestic league appearances and goals

Thomas Stickroth (born 13 April 1965) is a German football manager and former player.

== Playing career ==
Beginning as a youth player at VfB Stuttgart, Stickroth spent nearly his entire career in Germany, playing with SC Freiburg, FC Homburg, Bayer Uerdingen, 1. FC Saarbrücken and VfL Bochum. His only spell outside of Germany came between 1990 and 1992, when he played for Scottish side St Mirren.

== Coaching career ==
From the beginning of 2009, he became assistant coach for his friend Uwe Fuchs at 3. Liga side Wuppertaler SV Borussia and was on 2 April 2010 named as caretaker by Wuppertaler SV.

Stickroth was appointed as assistant coach for Roland Vrabec at FC Vaduz in the summer of 2017. After head coach Roland Vrabec got fired on 5 September 2017, Stickroth took over as a caretaker manager. It lasted until 17 September, when Mario Frick was appointed as the new head coach.

On 4 December 2018, Stickroth became the assistant coach of Jens Keller at FC Ingolstadt 04.
