= Ottersweier =

- Municipality
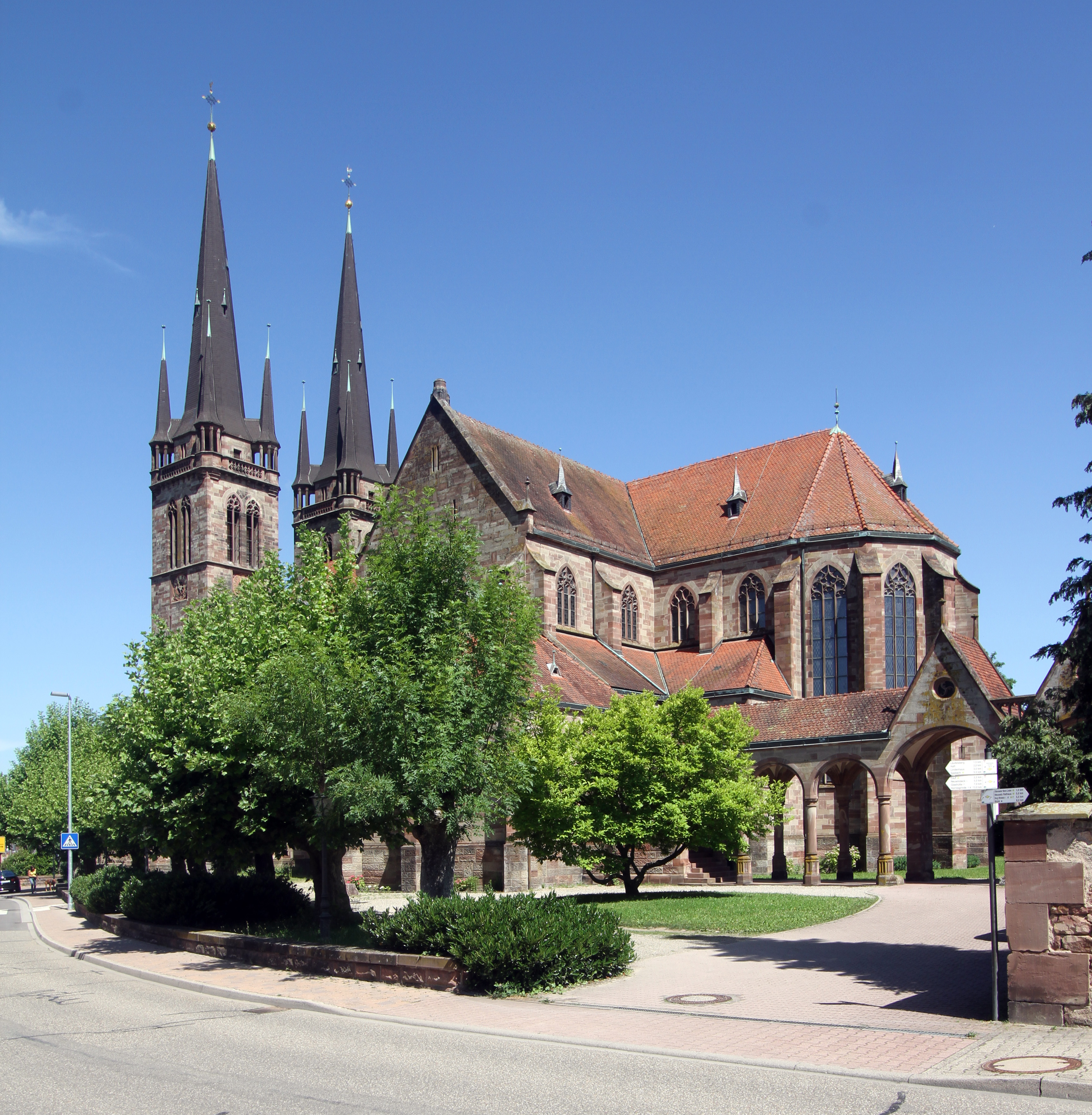
- Church of Saint John

- Coat of arms

- Location of Ottersweier within Rastatt district
- Interactive map of Ottersweier
- Location within Germany Location within Baden-Württemberg
- Coordinates: 48°40′16″N 08°06′39″E
- Country: Germany
- State: Baden-Württemberg
- Admin. region: Karlsruhe
- District: Rastatt

Government
  - Mayor (2023–31): Jürgen Pfetzer (CDU)

Area
  - Total: 29.21 km^{2} (11.28 sq mi)
- Elevation: 137 m (449 ft)

Population (2025-12-31)
  - Total: 6,351
  - Density: 217.4/km^{2} (563.1/sq mi)
- Time zone: UTC+01:00 (CET)
  - Summer (DST): UTC+02:00 (CEST)
- Postal codes: 77833
- Dialling codes: 07223
- Vehicle registration: RA
- Website: www.ottersweier.de

Ottersweier is a municipality in western Baden-Württemberg, Germany. It is part of the district of Rastatt, and lies between the larger towns Bühl and Achern.

== History ==
=== 18th Century ===
In 1774, the widow Margravine Maria Viktoria Pauline von Arenberg moved her residence from Baden-Baden to Ottersweier to establish a convent school for the Augustinian choir nuns in the former residence of the Jesuits. In the convent school, young girls learned skills they needed as future mothers and educators.

Ottersweier was long part of the Bühl district and, after its dissolution in 1973, became part of the Rastatt district.

== Twin cities ==
- - Westerlo, Flanders, Belgium, since 1962
- - Krauschwitz (Saxony), Germany, since 1989

== Sons and daughters of the place ==
- Joseph Sauer (1872–1949) born in the district of Unzhurst, theologian, Christian archaeologist and art historian
- Bernhard Friedmann (1932–2021), politician (CDU), Member of the Bundestag 1976–1990, President of the European Court of Auditors 1996-1999
