= 1995–96 2. Bundesliga =

22nd season of the second-tier football league in Germany

2. Bundesliga
- Season: 1995–96
- Champions: VfL Bochum
- Promoted: VfL Bochum; Arminia Bielefeld; MSV Duisburg
- Relegated: Chemnitzer FC; Hannover 96; 1. FC Nürnberg; SG Wattenscheid 09
- Matches played: 306
- Top goalscorer: Fritz Walter (21 goals)
- Average attendance: 7,518

The 1995–96 2. Bundesliga season was the twenty-second season of the 2. Bundesliga, the second tier of the German football league system.

VfL Bochum, Arminia Bielefeld and MSV Duisburg were promoted to the Bundesliga while Chemnitzer FC, Hannover 96, 1. FC Nürnberg and SG Wattenscheid 09 were relegated to the Regionalliga.

== League table ==
For the 1995–96 season SpVgg Unterhaching, VfB Lübeck, FC Carl Zeiss Jena and Arminia Bielefeld were newly promoted to the 2. Bundesliga from the Regionalliga while VfL Bochum and MSV Duisburg had been relegated to the league from the Bundesliga.

Locations of the participating teams of the 1995–96 season

Pos	Team	Pld	W	D	L	GF	GA	GD	Pts	Promotion or relegation
1	VfL Bochum (C, P)	34	21	6	7	68	30	+38	69	Promotion to Bundesliga
2	Arminia Bielefeld (P)	34	16	9	9	55	45	+10	57	Promotion to Bundesliga
3	MSV Duisburg (P)	34	15	11	8	55	37	+18	56	Promotion to Bundesliga
4	SpVgg Unterhaching	34	14	10	10	52	38	+14	52	
5	FSV Zwickau	34	15	4	15	39	48	−9	49	
6	Carl Zeiss Jena	34	13	9	12	49	54	−5	48	
7	Waldhof Mannheim	34	13	7	14	49	47	+2	46	
8	Fortuna Köln	34	12	10	12	37	37	0	46	
9	VfB Leipzig	34	13	6	15	35	49	−14	45	
10	SV Meppen	34	10	14	10	45	43	+2	44	
11	Mainz 05	34	12	8	14	37	41	−4	44	
12	VfL Wolfsburg	34	10	14	10	41	46	−5	44	
13	VfB Lübeck	34	13	5	16	40	45	−5	44	
14	Hertha BSC	34	11	12	11	37	35	+2	45	
15	Chemnitzer FC (R)	34	11	9	14	43	51	−8	42	Relegation to Regionalliga (Note: Hannover 96 was relegated to Regionalliga Nord. Chemnitzer FC was relegated to Regionalliga Nordost. 1. FC Nürnberg was relegated to Regionalliga Süd. SG Wattenscheid 09 was relegated to Regionalliga West/Südwest.)
16	Hannover 96 (R)	34	10	7	17	38	48	−10	37	Relegation to Regionalliga
17	1. FC Nürnberg (R)	34	9	12	13	33	40	−7	39	Relegation to Regionalliga
18	SG Wattenscheid 09 (R)	34	8	7	19	38	57	−19	31	Relegation to Regionalliga

Source: kicker
Rules for classification: 1) points; 2) goal difference; 3) number of goals scored.
(C) Champions; (P) Promoted; (R) Relegated

== Results ==
Home \ Away	BSC	DSC	BOC	CFC	DUI	H96	JEN	FKO	LEI	LUE	M05	WMA	SVM	FCN	UNT	SGW	WOB	ZWI
Hertha BSC	—	0–0	0–2	1–1	1–0	4–1	2–4	0–0	2–0	0–0	2–0	1–0	1–4	0–1	1–0	1–2	2–2	0–0
Arminia Bielefeld	1–0	—	1–3	3–1	3–2	2–1	1–2	2–1	3–0	2–1	2–0	2–2	2–2	2–2	2–2	1–0	1–0	4–0
VfL Bochum	2–2	2–0	—	2–2	0–1	1–0	1–1	3–1	3–0	3–1	3–0	3–1	4–1	4–0	3–1	2–2	0–0	3–0
Chemnitzer FC	1–2	5–1	0–2	—	1–0	2–1	3–0	1–1	1–2	2–1	0–3	1–1	2–0	1–1	2–0	2–0	0–4	0–1
MSV Duisburg	2–0	1–1	0–0	1–0	—	4–0	4–1	2–2	5–1	2–1	0–3	1–1	3–1	1–1	1–1	0–2	2–1	3–0
Hannover 96	1–0	0–1	2–0	4–2	2–2	—	1–1	2–0	4–0	0–0	0–2	1–0	1–0	2–2	1–3	3–0	0–1	1–1
Carl Zeiss Jena	0–3	2–1	0–4	4–1	2–4	4–1	—	1–0	3–1	3–1	6–1	0–0	2–2	1–0	1–0	1–1	1–1	2–0
Fortuna Köln	0–1	1–0	0–2	1–2	1–1	1–0	6–0	—	2–1	1–3	1–0	1–0	0–0	1–0	0–2	2–0	2–0	1–1
VfB Leipzig	2–2	0–0	0–1	0–0	2–2	1–0	2–0	1–1	—	2–1	0–0	2–0	0–3	2–1	3–2	1–0	2–0	2–0
VfB Lübeck	0–1	0–2	3–0	0–2	2–1	2–0	2–1	0–1	0–2	—	3–0	3–1	1–1	0–0	3–1	2–1	1–1	3–1
Mainz 05	0–0	2–0	1–0	4–2	0–1	0–2 (Note: The Mainz 05 v Hannover 96 match from 5 August 1995, which finished with a score of 2–2, was later awarded to Hannover 96 with a score of 0–2 due to Mainz 05 fielding the ineligible player Thomas Ziemer.)	3–0	2–0	0–1	0–1	—	0–0	0–0	0–2	3–1	2–0	2–2	1–0
Waldhof Mannheim	3–2	3–5	1–0	4–1	1–3	1–0	1–0	2–0	2–0	2–0	2–2	—	2–0	1–4	0–1	5–2	3–0	3–1
SV Meppen	1–1	2–2	2–3	2–0	1–1	0–0	1–1	2–2	0–2	2–0	2–1	2–1	—	2–0	0–0	4–0	2–1	3–0
1. FC Nürnberg	1–0	0–2	0–1	1–1	0–0	0–2	0–2	1–1	1–0	0–1	1–2	2–4	2–1	—	2–2	3–0	0–0	2–1
SpVgg Unterhaching	0–0	3–0	4–2	0–1	1–2	1–0	2–0	2–0	4–1	5–0	0–0	3–1	1–1	0–0	—	1–0	2–2	4–2
SG Wattenscheid	0–0	3–2	1–3	2–2	0–2	5–1	1–1	2–3	2–1	2–3	2–1	0–0	3–0	1–2	0–0	—	1–2	3–1
VfL Wolfsburg	1–4	1–1	0–5	1–1	3–1	3–3	1–1	1–3	1–0	2–1	2–2	2–0	0–0	1–1	3–1	1–0	—	0–1
FSV Zwickau	3–1	1–3	2–1	1–0	1–0	2–1	2–1	0–0	3–1	1–0	3–0	2–1	4–1	1–0	1–2	2–0	0–1	—

Source: DFB
Legend: Blue = home team win; Yellow = draw; Red = away team win.

== Top scorers ==
The league's top scorers:

Goals	Player	Team
21	(Germany) Fritz Walter	Arminia Bielefeld
15	(Germany) Torsten Gütschow	Chemnitzer FC
15	(Germany) Daniel Jurgeleit	VfB Lübeck
14	(Germany) Jörg Kirsten	FSV Zwickau
13	(Germany) Marcus Marin	MSV Duisburg
12	(Croatia) Niko Kovač	Hertha BSC Berlin
11	(Germany) Peter Közle	VfL Bochum
11	(Germany) Peter Peschel	VfL Bochum
11	(Germany) Thomas Ziemer	1. FSV Mainz 05
10	(Germany) Michael Koch	VfB Lübeck
10	(Germany) Giuseppe Reina	SG Wattenscheid 09
10	(Germany) Mark Zimmermann	FC Carl Zeiss Jena
