= 1995–96 Fortuna Düsseldorf season =

Fortuna Düsseldorf
1995–96 season
- Manager: Aleksandar Ristić
- Stadium: Rheinstadion
- Bundesliga: 13th
- DFB-Pokal: Semi-finals
- Top goalscorer: League: Ryszard Cyroń (9); All: Ryszard Cyroń (10)
- Highest home attendance: 55,850 (vs Bayern Munich, 9 December 1995, Bundesliga)
- Lowest home attendance: 10,000 (vs Chemnitzer FC, 7 November 1995, DFB-Pokal)
- Average home league attendance: 24,568

The 1995–96 season was Fortuna Düsseldorf's 100th year in existence and 1st season in the top flight of German football after getting promoted from 1994–95 2. Bundesliga. In addition to the domestic league, Fortune Dusseldorf participated in this season's editions of the DFB-Pokal. The season covered the period from 1 July 1995 to 30 June 1996.

== Season summary ==
On their return to the Bundesliga, Fortuna Düsseldorf avoided relegation with a respectable 13th-placed finish.

== Players ==
=== First team squad ===
Squad at end of season

Note: Flags indicate national team as defined under FIFA eligibility rules; some limited exceptions apply. Players may hold more than one non-FIFA nationality.

No.	Pos.	Nation	Player
1	GK	GER	Georg Koch
2	DF	GER	André Winkhold
3	DF	GER	Ulf Mehlhorn
4	DF	GER	Karl Werner
5	FW	GER	Frank Mill
6	DF	CRO	Darko Dražić (Note: Dražić was born in Novi Travnik, SFR Yugoslavia (now Bosnia and Herzegovina), but also qualified to represent Croatia internationally and made his international debut for Croatia in 1990.)
7	MF	BIH	Vlatko Glavaš
8	MF	POL	Andrzej Buncol
9	MF	GER	Thomas Seeliger
10	MF	CRO	Kujtim Shala (Note: Shala was born in Prizren, SFR Yugoslavia (now Kosovo), but also qualified to represent Croatia internationally and made his international debut for Croatia in October 1990.)
11	FW	GER	Christian Radlmaier
12	GK	GER	Pierre Esser
13	DF	YUG	Zvezdan Pejović
14	MF	GER	Harald Katemann
15	MF	GER	Stefan Minkwitz

No.	Pos.	Nation	Player
16	FW	ITA	Raffael Tonello
17	FW	GER	Thomas Brdarić
18	MF	GER	Thorsten Judt
19	FW	NED	Severino Pusić
20	DF	GER	Jörn Schwinkendorf
21	DF	GER	Dirk Schreiber
22	FW	MKD	Darko Pančev
23	DF	GER	Rasim Suksur
24	DF	GER	Thomas Bahr
25	MF	POL	Robert Niestroj
26	FW	POL	Ryszard Cyroń
27	DF	GER	Jörg Bach
28	MF	GER	Rudi Istenič (Note: Istenič was born in Cologne, West Germany (now Germany), but also qualified to represent Slovenia internationally and would make his international debut for Slovenia in 1997.)
34	MF	GER	Markus Anfang
36	FW	GER	Dennis Ibrahim

== Competitions ==
=== Overall record ===
Competition	First match	Last match	Starting round	Final position	Record							
Competition	First match	Last match	Starting round	Final position	Pld	W	D	L	GF	GA	GD	Win %
Bundesliga	11 August 1995	18 May 1996	Matchday 1	13th	34	8	16	10	40	47	−7	23.53
DFB-Pokal	25 August 1995	28 February 1996	First round	Semi-finals	5	4	0	1	10	6	+4	80.00
Total					39	12	16	11	50	53	−3	30.77

Source: WorldFootball

=== Bundesliga ===
==== League table ====
Pos	Team	Pld	W	D	L	GF	GA	GD	Pts
11	SC Freiburg	34	11	9	14	30	41	−11	42
12	1. FC Köln	34	9	13	12	33	35	−2	40
13	Fortuna Düsseldorf	34	8	16	10	40	47	−7	40
14	Bayer Leverkusen	34	8	14	12	37	38	−1	38
15	FC St. Pauli	34	9	11	14	43	51	−8	38

Source: www.dfb.de
Rules for classification: 1) points; 2) goal difference; 3) number of goals scored.

==== Results summary ====
Overall								Home						Away					
Pld	W	D	L	GF	GA	GD	Pts	W	D	L	GF	GA	GD	W	D	L	GF	GA	GD
34	8	16	10	40	47	−7	40	6	8	3	24	19	+5	2	8	7	16	28	−12

Source: WorldFootball

==== Results by matchday ====
Game Week	1	2	3	4	5	6	7	8	9	10	11	12	13	14	15	16	17	18	19	20	21	22	23	24	25	26	27	28	29	30	31	32	33	34
Ground	A	H	A	H	H	A	H	A	H	A	H	A	H	A	H	A	H	H	A	H	A	A	H	A	H	A	H	A	H	A	H	A	H	A
Result	D	D	D	D	D	L	W	L	D	L	D	L	W	L	L	L	L	D	D	W	D	L	W	W	D	D	W	D	L	D	W	W	D	D
Position	13	10	10	12	13	12	13	11	11	11	15	14	16	16	16	16	18	18	18	17	17	17	17	16	15	14	15	14	14	15	15	14	12	12

Source: WorldFootball
A = Away; H = Home; W = Win; D = Draw; L = Loss; P = Postponed
Notes: Positions show the situation at the end of the corresponding Game Weeks (GW); not the position at the conclusion of matches or game days

==== Matches ====
11 August 1995 1	Werder Bremen	1–1	Fortuna Düsseldorf	Bremen
19:00 CET	Hobsch 22'; Wiedener (yellow card); Basler (yellow card)	Report	Cyroń 2'; Werner (yellow card); Bach (yellow card); Seeliger (yellow card); Brdarić (yellow card)	Stadium: Weserstadion; Attendance: 28,000; Referee: Lutz Wagner

20 August 1995 2	Fortuna Düsseldorf	1–1	1. FC Köln	Düsseldorf
17:00 CET	Mill 30'; Mehlhorn (yellow card)	Report	Janßen 61'	Stadium: Rheinstadion; Attendance: 45,000; Referee: Edgar Steinborn

30 August 1995 3	Schalke 04	1–1	Fortuna Düsseldorf	Gelsenkirchen
19:00 CET	Max 84'; Büskens (yellow card)	Report	Mill 9'; Koch (yellow card); Werner (yellow card); Winkhold (yellow card); Glavaš (yellow card)	Stadium: Parkstadion; Attendance: 29,276; Referee: Hans-Peter Best

2 September 1995 4	Fortuna Düsseldorf	2–2	Hansa Rostock	Düsseldorf
14:30 CET	Winkhold 63'; Pančev 67'; Dražić (yellow card); Bach (yellow card); Glavaš (yellow card)	Report	Baumgart 9'; Lange 71'; März (yellow card); Breitkreutz (yellow card); Hofschneider (yellow card); Studer (yellow card)	Stadium: Rheinstadion; Attendance: 13,000; Referee: Hans-Jürgen Kasper

9 September 1995 5	Fortuna Düsseldorf	2–2	Hamburg SV	Düsseldorf
14:30 CET	Seeliger 13'; Cyroń 66'; Dražić (yellow card); Buncol (yellow card)	Report	Fischer 5' (red card) 61'; Albertz 77'; Henchoz (yellow card)	Stadium: Rheinstadion; Attendance: 16,500; Referee: Lutz-Michael Fröhlich

15 September 1995 6	Fortuna Düsseldorf	3–1	Karlsruher SC	Karlsruhe
19:00 CET	Bender 3', 71'; Schmitt 88'; Metz (yellow card); Kiriakov (yellow card); Carl (yellow card)	Report	Dražić 26'; Glavaš (yellow card)	Stadium: Wildparkstadion; Attendance: 22,000; Referee: Lutz Pohlmann

=== DFB-Pokal ===
25 August 1995 First round	Dynamo Dresden	1–3	Fortuna Düsseldorf	Dresden
19:00 CET	Schmidt 79' (yellow card); Braun (yellow card); Maglica (yellow card)	Report	Mill 48', 64'; Braun 63' (o.g.)	Stadium: Rudolf-Harbig-Stadion; Attendance: 11,550; Referee: Thomas Rüdiger

18 September 1995 Second round	Fortuna Düsseldorf	3–1	Bayern Munich	Düsseldorf
18:45 CET	Pančev 22'; Cyroń 79'; Seeliger 90'; Winkhold (yellow card)	Report	Helmer 73'; Nerlinger (yellow card)	Stadium: Rheinstadion; Attendance: 45,000; Referee: Alfons Berg

4 October 1995 Round of 16	Fortuna Düsseldorf	3–1	Chemnitzer FC	Düsseldorf
19:00 CET	Werner 58'; Minkwitz 63'; Bach 86'; Shala (yellow card)	Report	Fuchs 28'; Melzig (yellow card); Panadić (yellow card); Renn (yellow card) (yellow-red card) 83'	Stadium: Rheinstadion; Attendance: 10,000; Referee: Lutz Wagner

7 November 1995 Quarter-finals	Fortuna Düsseldorf	1–0	1. FC Nürnberg	Düsseldorf
17:00 CET	Mill 56'; Winkhold (yellow card)	Report		Stadium: Rheinstadion; Attendance: 10,000; Referee: Hans-Jürgen Kasper

28 February 1996 Semi-finals	Karlsruher SC	1–0	Fortuna Düsseldorf	Karlsruhe
18:00 CET	Kiriakov 15' (yellow card); Häßler 79' (yellow card); Reich (yellow card); Tarnat (yellow card)	Report	Glavaš (yellow card); Shala (yellow card)	Stadium: Wildparkstadion; Attendance: 28,000; Referee: Bernd Heynemann

== Statistics ==
=== Appearances ===
No.	Pos.	Player	Bundesliga	DFB-Pokal	Total
1	GK	(Germany) Georg Koch	34	5	39
2	DF	(Germany) André Winkhold	29	5	34
3	DF	(Germany) Ulf Mehlhorn	30	5	35
4	DF	(Germany) Karl Werner	33	5	38
5	FW	(Germany) Frank Mill	28	4	32
6	DF	(Croatia) Darko Dražić	20	4	24
7	MF	(Bosnia and Herzegovina) Vlatko Glavaš	25	5	30
8	MF	(Poland) Andrzej Buncol	26	3	29
9	MF	(Germany) Thomas Seeliger	28	3	31
10	MF	(Croatia) Kujtim Shala	15	3	18
14	MF	(Germany) Harald Katemann	24	2	26
15	MF	(Germany) Stefan Minkwitz	10	2	12
16	FW	(Italy) Raffael Tonello	10	1	11
18	MF	(Germany) Thorsten Judt	17	1	18
20	DF	(Germany) Jörn Schwinkendorf	18	4	22
22	FW	(North Macedonia) Darko Pančev	14	3	17
26	FW	(Poland) Ryszard Cyroń	20	3	32
27	DF	(Germany) Jörg Bach	30	5	35
28	MF	(Germany) Rudi Istenič	15	3	18
29	MF	(Equatorial Guinea) Ben Manga	3	2	5
34	MF	(Germany) Markus Anfang	11	0	11
36	FW	(Germany) Dennis Ibrahim	3	0	3

=== Goalscorers ===
Rank	No.	Pos.	Player	Bundesliga	DFB-Pokal	Total
1	26	FW	(Poland) Ryszard Cyroń	9	1	10
2	9	MF	(Germany) Thomas Seeliger	4	1	5
2	5	FW	(Germany) Frank Mill	2	3	5
4	27	DF	(Germany) Jörg Bach	3	1	4
5	2	DF	(Germany) André Winkhold	3	0	3
5	6	DF	(Croatia) Darko Dražić	3	0	3
5	16	FW	(Italy) Raffael Tonello	3	0	3
5	18	MF	(Germany) Thorsten Judt	3	0	3
5	22	FW	(North Macedonia) Darko Pančev	2	1	3
10	4	DF	(Germany) Karl Werner	2	0	2
10	7	MF	(Bosnia and Herzegovina) Vlatko Glavaš	2	0	2
10	8	MF	(Poland) Andrzej Buncol	2	0	2
10	14	MF	(Germany) Harald Katemann	2	0	2
14	15	MF	(Germany) Stefan Minkwitz	0	1	1
