= List of Fortuna Düsseldorf players =

Fortuna Düsseldorf is a German football club based in Düsseldorf, North Rhine-Westphalia. The following list contains all the footballers that have made over 100 league appearances for the club since 1947. Statistics from before this period are incomplete.

== Players ==
Statistics correct as of the end of the 2025–26 season

Name	Nationality	Position	Club career	Appearances	Goals	Notes
Jörg Albertz	Germany	Midfielder	1990–1993, 2003–2007	109	11	
Klaus Allofs	Germany	Forward	1975–1981	169	71	
Thomas Allofs	Germany	Forward	1978–1982, 1989–1992	182	57	
Shinta Appelkamp	Germany	Midfielder	2020–2026	159	21	
Kaan Ayhan	Turkey	Defender	2016–2020	113	8	
Sven Backhaus	Germany	Defender	1986–1990, 1992–1995	147	10	
Heiner Baltes	Germany	Defender	1970–1981	281	11	
Herbert Bayer	Germany	Midfielder	1956–1963	139	0	
Axel Bellinghausen	Germany	Midfielder	2001–2005, 2012–2017	211	16	
Peter Biesenkamp	Germany	Defender	1968–1975	120	13	
Manfred Bockenfeld	Germany	Defender	1981–1987	178	20	
Dirk Böcker	Germany	Defender	2002–2006	114	5	
Adam Bodzek	Poland	Midfielder	2011–2022	284	7	
Rudi Bommer	Germany	Midfielder	1976–1985	264	38	
Kurt Borkenhagen	Germany	Defender	1947–1955	176	0	
Dieter Brei	Germany	Midfielder	1972–1981	221	30	
Klaus Budde	Germany	Forward	1968–1975	209	59	
Andrzej Buncol	Poland	Midfielder	1992–1997	119	16	
Michael Büskens	Germany	Midfielder	1988–1992	102	6	
Hamza Çakır	Germany	Defender	2004–2010	142	4	
Ahmed Cebe	Germany	Forward	2005–2009	128	18	
Claus Costa	Germany	Midfielder	2006–2011	114	2	
Ryszard Cyron	Poland	Forward	1992–1997	131	47	
Jörg Daniel	Germany	Goalkeeper	1976–1981	112	0	
Sven Demandt	Germany	Forward	1984–1989, 1990–1992	182	70	
Jupp Derwall	Germany	Forward	1954–1959	110	47	
Patrick Deuß	Germany	Goalkeeper	2002–2007	105	0	
Darko Dražić	Croatia	Defender	1991–1998	152	14	
Ralf Dusend	Germany	Midfielder	1977–1987	239	40	
Atli Eðvaldsson	Iceland	Forward	1981–1985	122	38	
Holger Fach	Germany	Midfielder	1981–1988, 1996–1998	198	26	
Oliver Fink	Germany	Midfielder	2009–2020	257	21	
Rainer Geye	Germany	Forward	1968–1977	286	116	
Albert Görtz	Germany	Goalkeeper	1957–1966	172	0	
Karl Gramminger	Germany	Forward	1952–1958	156	81	
Martin Gramminger	Germany	Forward	1952–1958	146	49	
Horst Häfner	Germany	Midfielder	1963–1967	114	9	
Hans-Josef Hellingrath	Germany	Defender	1961–1967	151	10	
Rouwen Hennings	Germany	Forward	2016–2023	213	72	
Dieter Herzog	Germany	Forward	1970–1976	201	53	
Fred Hesse	Germany	Defender	1966–1976	297	16	
Hilmar Hoffer	Germany	Forward	1960–1972	256	38	
André Hoffmann	Germany	Defender	2017–2025	175	10	
Karl Hoffmann	Germany	Defender	1955–1966	258	5	
Rudi Istenič	Slovenia	Midfielder	1995–1999	107	3	
Klaus Iwanzik	Germany	Defender	1967–1972	106	4	
Emmanuel Iyoha	Germany	Forward	2015–2026	145	8	
Günter Jäger	Germany	Defender	1955–1963	140	1	
Heinz Janssen	Germany	Forward	1956–1963	161	59	
Erich Juskowiak	Germany	Defender	1953–1961	195	32	
Andreas Kaiser	Germany	Midfielder	1984–1993	193	9	
Florian Kastenmeier	Germany	Goalkeeper	2019–2026	211	0	
Harald Katemann	Germany	Midfielder	1994–1999	124	7	
Rolf Kern	Germany	Forward	1949–1958	193	43	
Felix Klaus	Germany	Midfielder	2021–2024	115	16	
Heinz Klose	Germany	Goalkeeper	1950–1951, 1954–1959	101	0	
Georg Koch	Germany	Goalkeeper	1992–1997	131	0	
Egon Köhnen	Germany	Defender	1966–1981	376	17	
Dawid Kownacki	Poland	Forward	2019–2025	125	38	
Manfred Krafft	Germany	Defender	1959–1966	125	12	
Werner Kriegler	Germany	Defender	1967–1977	279	7	
Dirk Krümpelmann	Germany	Midfielder	1986–1991	132	17	
Günter Kuczinski	Germany	Defender	1980–1986	121	1	
Andreas Lambertz	Germany	Midfielder	2003–2015	320	40	
Jens Langeneke	Germany	Midfielder	2006–2013	202	32	
Peter Löhr	Germany	Defender	1980–1985	102	0	
Ralf Loose	Germany	Defender	1987–1993	188	4	
Werner Lungwitz	Germany	Defender	1966–1974	223	10	
Bruno Makus	Germany	Forward	1947–1952	123	37	
Matthias Mauritz	Germany	Defender	1947–1960	323	49	
Frank Mayer	Germany	Forward	2001–2005	113	44	
Peter Meyer	Germany	Forward	1960–1967	174	119	
Hans Müller	Germany	Forward	1947–1957	243	113	
Robert Niestroj	Poland	Midfielder	1996–1999, 2001–2004	117	14	
Tim Oberdorf	Germany	Defender	2021–	133	5	
Petr Rada	Czech Republic	Defender	1988–1990, 1993–1995	109	7	
Michael Rensing	Germany	Goalkeeper	2013–2019	132	0	
Julian Schauerte	Germany	Defender	2014–2018	111	1	
Jörg Schmadtke	Germany	Goalkeeper	1985–1993	244	0	
Michael Schütz	Germany	Midfielder	1987–1993	205	22	
Wolfgang Seel	Germany	Forward	1973–1982	274	59	
Thomas Seeliger	Germany	Midfielder	1987–1989, 1995–1997	105	16	
Marcel Sobottka	Germany	Midfielder	2015–2025	210	14	
Bernhard Steffen	Germany	Forward	1957–1966	225	51	
Hermann Straschitz	Germany	Midfielder	1960–1964	104	42	
Reinhold Straus	Germany	Forward	1963–1967	120	40	
Amand Theis	Germany	Defender	1980–1984	105	10	
Günter Thiele	Germany	Forward	1979–1986	128	44	
Toni Turek	Germany	Goalkeeper	1950–1955	133	0	
Johannes van den Bergh	Germany	Defender	2009–2013	124	0	
Josef Weikl	Germany	Midfielder	1977–1988	339	26	
Rüdiger Wenzel	Germany	Forward	1979–1984	143	26	
Karl Werner	Czech Republic	Forward	1988–1992, 1993–1997	232	6	
Jakob Wimmer	Germany	Defender	1952–1958	124	4	
Rudolf Wojtowicz	Poland	Defender	1986–1992	144	1	
Franz-Josef Wolfframm	Germany	Midfielder	1957–1964	170	75	
Wilfried Woyke	Germany	Goalkeeper	1966–1979	232	0	
Rudolf Zedi	Germany	Defender	1998–2002	113	10	
Gerd Zewe	Germany	Midfielder	1972–1987	440	41	
Gerd Zimmermann	Germany	Defender	1974–1980	166	40	
Matthias Zimmermann	Germany	Defender	2018–	233	14	
