= 2001–02 DFB-Pokal =

Tournament details
- Country: Germany
- Teams: 64

Final positions
- Champions: Schalke 04
- Runners-up: Bayer Leverkusen

Tournament statistics
- Matches played: 63
- Top goal scorer: Dimitar Berbatov (6)

The 2001–02 DFB-Pokal was the 59th season of the annual German football cup competition. 64 teams competed in the tournament of six rounds which began on 24 August 2001 and ended on 11 May 2002. In the final Schalke 04 defeated Bayer Leverkusen 4–2, defending their title from the previous season and thereby claiming their fourth title.

== Matches ==
Times up to 27 October 2001 and from 31 March 2002 are CEST (UTC+2). Times from 28 October 2001 to 30 March 2002 are CET (UTC+1).

=== First round ===
| 24 August 2001 | Rot-Weiss Erfurt | 2–2 (a.e.t.) (9–8 p) | LR Ahlen | Erfurt |
| | Bach 54' (pen.); Pätz 87' | Report (in German) | Feinbier 13'; Fengler 18' | Stadium: Steigerwaldstadion; Attendance: 2,500; Referee: Manuel Gräfe (Berlin) |
| | Penalties |
| | Oswald (penalty scored); Hartung (penalty scored); Ziegner (penalty missed); Bach (penalty scored); Seifert (penalty scored); Gansauge (penalty scored); Pätz (penalty missed); Bancic (penalty scored); Szewczuk (penalty missed); Twardzik (penalty scored); Oswald (penalty scored); Hartung (penalty scored) | | Dama (penalty scored); Daschner (penalty scored); Vasiljevic (penalty missed); Schuster (penalty scored); Rösele (penalty scored); Feinbier (penalty scored); Zimmermann (penalty missed); Hamann (penalty scored); Simon (penalty missed); Langerbein (penalty scored); Dama (penalty scored); Rösele (penalty missed) |

| 24 August 2001 | VfB Stuttgart (A) | 0–1 | SpVgg Greuther Fürth | Stuttgart |
| | | Report (in German) | Azzouzi 60' | Stadium: Robert-Schlienz-Stadion; Attendance: 1,200; Referee: Kammmerer (Karlsruhe) |

| 24 August 2001 | VfR Mannheim | 1–3 | Hannover 96 | Mannheim |
| | Benda 89' (pen.) | Report (in German) | Keita 6'; Stendel 46'; Kaufman 63' | Attendance: 1,200; Referee: Markus Schmidt (Stuttgart) |

| 24 August 2001 | Stuttgarter Kickers | 1–5 | SpVgg Unterhaching | Stuttgart |
| | Njock 82' | Report (in German) | Zimmermann 6'; Spiżak 48', 49', 57'; Schwarz 60' | Attendance: 2,000; Referee: Stefan Trautmann (Bodenwerder) |

| 24 August 2001 | SV Yeşilyurt | 2–4 | SC Freiburg | Berlin |
| | Yakut 40'; Perktas 71' | Report (in German) | Tanko 28'; Iashvili 57'; Müller 76'; Bruns 78' | Attendance: 3,000; Referee: Florian Meyer (Braunschweig) |

| 25 August 2001 | SV Babelsberg 03 | 1–2 | Hertha BSC | Potsdam |
| | Röver 3' | Report (in German) | Marcelinho 55'; Alves 89' | Stadium: Karl-Liebknecht-Stadion; Attendance: 14,700; Referee: Uwe Kemmling (Kleinburgwedel) |

| 25 August 2001 | FC Homburg | 2–5 | Hamburger SV | Homburg |
| | Sorg 52'; Jung 53' | Report (in German) | Meijer 1'; Hoogma 11', 30'; Groth 23'; Bester 40' | Stadium: Waldstadion; Attendance: 8,000; Referee: Alfons Berg (Konz) |

| 25 August 2001 | FC St. Pauli (A) | 0–1 (a.e.t.) | Eintracht Frankfurt | Hamburg |
| | | Report (in German) | Skela 118' (pen.) | Attendance: 5,600; Referee: Torsten Koop (Lüttenmark) |

| 25 August 2001 | KFC Uerdingen | 1–0 | Energie Cottbus | Krefeld |
| | Fiore 63' | Report (in German) | | Stadium: Grotenburg-Stadion; Attendance: 3,000; Referee: Ralf Späker (Marl) |

| 25 August 2001 | Würzburger FV | 0–10 | 1860 München | Würzburg |
| | | Report (in German) | Schroth 19'; Weissenberger 25', 74', 75', 89'; Max 45', 48'; Häßler 47'; Borimirov 68'; Ipoua 74' | Attendance: 10,000; Referee: Volker Wezel (Tübingen) |

| 25 August 2001 | VfR Aalen | 0–2 | Rot-Weiss Oberhausen | Aalen |
| | | Report (in German) | Lipinski 20' (pen.); Beliakov 87' | Stadium: Städtisches Waldstadion; Attendance: 21,000; Referee: Felix Brych (Munich) |

| 25 August 2001 | Erzgebirge Aue | 1–2 (a.e.t.) | Mainz 05 | Aue |
| | Hasse 29' | Report (in German) | Hock 10'; Voronin 114' | Stadium: Erzgebirgssstadion; Attendance: 3,500; Referee: Stefan Weber (Eisenach) |

| 25 August 2001 | Blau-Weiß Brühl | 1–4 | 1. FC Kaiserslautern | Brühl |
| | Morig 18' (pen.) | Report (in German) | Lokvenc 28', 44'; Knavs 42'; Lincoln 89' | Attendance: 6,500; Referee: Günter Perl (Munich) |

| 25 August 2001 | VfL Osnabrück | 2–1 | Hansa Rostock | Osnabrück |
| | Poutilo 35'; Everson 70' | Report (in German) | Arvidsson 72' | Stadium: Stadion an der Bremer Brücke; Attendance: 6,400; Referee: Lutz Michael Fröhlich (Berlin) |

| 25 August 2001 | VfB Lübeck | 2–3 | Werder Bremen | Lübeck |
| | Scharping 15'; Kruppke 80' | Report (in German) | Aílton 20', 27'; Tjikuzu 53' | Stadium: Lohmühle Stadion; Attendance: 11,000; Referee: Jürgen Jansen (Essen) |

| 25 August 2001 | Eintracht Trier | 2–4 (a.e.t.) | Alemannia Aachen | Trier |
| | Keller 69'; Aziz 113' | Report (in German) | Ivanović 15'; Xiaorui 99'; Diané 103'; Lämmermann 111' | Stadium: Moselstadion; Attendance: 4,200; Referee: Kai Voss (Großhansdorf) |

| 25 August 2001 | Karlsruher SC | 2–5 | Waldhof Mannheim | Karlsruhe |
| | Fuchs 20', 69' (pen.) | Report (in German) | Grimm 30' (o.g.); Klausz 35', 64'; Ćatić 55'; Ivanov 72' | Stadium: Wildparkstadion; Attendance: 12,400; Referee: Peter Lange (Filderstadt) |

| 25 August 2001 | VfL Wolfsburg (A) | 1–0 | Borussia Dortmund | Wolfsburg |
| | Vandreike 64' | Report (in German) | | Attendance: 5,100; Referee: Christian Schößling (Leipzig) |

| 26 August 2001 | Darmstadt 98 | 3–1 | FC St. Pauli | Darmstadt |
| | Kolb 11'; Maier 21'; Musci 90' | Report (in German) | Patschinski 13' | Attendance: 8,000; Referee: Detlef Scheppe (Wenden) |

| 26 August 2001 | Werder Bremen (A) | 5–0 | 1. FC Saarbrücken | Bremen |
| | Mamoum 16'; Kern 43'; Schulz 60'; Borowski 79'; Rolfes 90' | Report (in German) | | Stadium: Weserstadion, Platz 2 Attendance: 700; Referee: Thomas Frank (Hannover) |

| 26 August 2001 | Energie Cottbus (A) | 0–4 | Arminia Bielefeld | Cottbus |
| | | Report (in German) | Borges 11'; Kauf 13'; Van der Ven 74'; Flock 88' | Attendance: 1,000; Referee: Babak Rafati (Hannover) |

| 26 August 2001 | FC Schüttorf 09 | 1–4 | SSV Reutlingen | Schüttorf |
| | Böger 74' | Report (in German) | Becker 22'; Garcia 36'; Djappa 58'; Hoffmann 88' | Attendance: 800; Referee: Edgar Steinborn (Sinzig) |

| 26 August 2001 | Schalke 04 (A) | 0–1 | VfL Bochum | Gelsenkirchen |
| | | Report (in German) | Christiansen 22' | Attendance: 3,000; Referee: Dirk Margenberg (Gelsenkirchen) |

| 26 August 2001 | FC Schönberg 95 | 2–4 | VfB Stuttgart | Schönberg |
| | Urgast 12'; Neitzel 15' | Report (in German) | Gerber 59'; Adhemar 65', 89'; Kurányi 87' | Attendance: 4,500; Referee: Matthias Anklam (Buchholz in der Nordheide) |

| 26 August 2001 | SSV Jahn Regensburg | 0–3 | Bayer Leverkusen | Regensburg |
| | | Report (in German) | Kirsten 13'; Lúcio 54'; Schneider 61' | Attendance: 10,500; Referee: Jörg Keßler (Höhenkirchen) |

| 26 August 2001 | Chemnitzer FC | 2–5 | 1. FC Köln | Chemnitz |
| | Fröhlich 7'; Krieg 8' | Report (in German) | Scherz 9', 66', 75'; Donkov 19'; Kreuz 42' | Stadium: Stadion an der Gellertstraße; Attendance: 4,300; Referee: Frank Minskowski (Hanstedt) |

| 26 August 2001 | Mainz 05 (A) | 0–0 (a.e.t.) (2–4 p) | Borussia Mönchengladbach | Mainz |
| | | Report (in German) | | Stadium: Bruchwegstadion; Attendance: 5,000; Referee: Wolfgang Stark (Ergolding) |
| | Penalties |
| | Eichinger (penalty scored); Azaouagh (penalty missed); Maas (penalty scored); Steffgen (penalty missed) | | Van Lent (penalty scored); Küntzel (penalty scored); Ulich (penalty scored); Van Houdt (penalty scored) |

| 26 August 2001 | SC Freiburg (A) | 0–1 | Schalke 04 | Freiburg |
| | | Report (in German) | Sand 70' | Attendance: 8,000; Referee: Peter Sippel (Munich) |

| 26 August 2001 | 1. FC Magdeburg | 1–5 | VfL Wolfsburg | Magdeburg |
| | Scholze 15' | Report (in German) | Munteanu 17'; Kennedy 23', 47'; Petrov 36'; Marić 83' | Stadium: Ernst-Grube-Stadion; Attendance: 8,800; Referee: Knut Kircher (Rottenburg) |

| 26 August 2001 | 1. FC Union Berlin | 1–0 | MSV Duisburg | Berlin |
| | Vidolov 66' (pen.) | Report (in German) | | Stadium: Alte Försterei; Attendance: 5,700; Referee: Peter Gagelmann (Bremen) |

| 26 August 2001 | SSV Ulm 1846 | 2–1 | 1. FC Nürnberg | Ulm |
| | Skowranek 25'; Trkulja 60' (pen.) | Report (in German) | Stoilov 40' | Stadium: Donaustadion; Attendance: 5,000; Referee: Thorsten Kinhöfer (Herne) |

| 27 August 2001 | SC Paderborn | 1–5 | Bayern Munich | Bielefeld |
| | Karpowicz 89' | Report (in German) | Jancker 6'; Santa Cruz 23'; Zickler 51', 71'; N. Kovač 65' | Stadium: Bielefelder Alm; Attendance: 24,000; Referee: Jürgen Aust (Cologne) |

=== Second round ===
| 27 November 2001 | Rot-Weiss Erfurt | 1–2 (a.e.t.) | Hertha BSC | Erfurt |
| | Hebestreit 44' | Report (in German) | Beinlich 1'; Dárdai 92' | Stadium: Steigerwaldstadion; Attendance: 6,200; Referee: Markus Schmidt (Stuttgart) |

| 27 November 2001 | Hamburger SV | 0–2 | VfB Stuttgart | Stuttgart |
| | | Report (in German) | Seitz 41'; Ganea 58' | Stadium: Volksparkstadion; Attendance: 19,000; Referee: Hermann Albrecht (Kaufbeuren) |

| 27 November 2001 | Arminia Bielefeld | 1–2 | Schalke 04 | Bielefeld |
| | Wichniarek 57' | Report (in German) | Sand 27'; Möller 90' | Stadium: Dreisamstadion; Attendance: 26,600; Referee: Jürgen Aust (Cologne) |

| 27 November 2001 | VfL Wolfsburg | 3–0 | SpVgg Unterhaching | Wolfsburg |
| | Müller 41'; Rische 63'; Plassnegger 90' | Report (in German) | | Attendance: 2,500; Referee: Herbert Fandel (Kyllburg) |

| 27 November 2001 | KFC Uerdingen | 1–1 (a.e.t.) (4–3 p) | Werder Bremen | Krefeld |
| | Schmugge 80' (pen.) | Report (in German) | Borowski 17' | Stadium: Grotenburg-Stadion; Attendance: 7,000; Referee: Mike Pickel (Mendig) |
| | Penalties |
| | Schmugge (penalty scored); Maaß (penalty scored); Janota (penalty missed); Rodríguez (penalty scored); Vriesde (penalty scored) | | Bode (penalty missed); Borowski (penalty scored); Skripnik (penalty scored); Banović (penalty scored); Verlaat (penalty missed) |

| 27 November 2001 | Mainz 05 | 3–2 | SpVgg Greuther Fürth | Mainz |
| | Thurk 44'; Kramny 47'; Babatz 90' | Report (in German) | Dworrak 16'; Ruman 87' | Attendance: 5,100; Referee: Lutz Michael Fröhlich (Berlin) |

| 28 November 2001 | 1860 München | 4–3 | Borussia Mönchengladbach | Munich |
| | Weissenberger 8'; Max 48'; Šuker 57'; Wiesinger 74' | Report (in German) | Hausweiler 29'; Van Lent 33'; Korzynietz 38' | Attendance: 5,700; Referee: Florian Meyer (Braunschweig) |

| 28 November 2001 | Waldhof Mannheim | 2–3 | 1. FC Kaiserslautern | Mannheim |
| | Teber 11', 53' | Report (in German) | Ramzy 27'; Lokvenc 42'; Marschall 90' | Attendance: 21,100; Referee: Franz-Xaver Wack (Biberbach) |

| 28 November 2001 | Alemannia Aachen | 1–2 | 1. FC Köln | Aachen |
| | Zernicke 60' | Report (in German) | Kurth 5'; Reich 29' | Stadium: Tivoli; Attendance: 22,500; Referee: Helmut Fleischer (Ulm) |

| 28 November 2001 | Darmstadt 98 | 3–3 (a.e.t.) (3–1 p) | SC Freiburg | Darmstadt |
| | Maier 32', 96'; Hasa 79' | Report (in German) | Kobiashvili 23'; Iashvili 83'; Gerber 116' | Attendance: 14,200; Referee: Peter Sippel (Munich) |
| | Penalties |
| | Mihajlović (penalty scored); Maier (penalty scored); Costa (penalty scored) | | Hermel (penalty scored); Kobiashvili (penalty missed); But (penalty missed); Gerber (penalty missed) |

| 28 November 2001 | SSV Reutlingen | 2–2 (a.e.t.) (3–4 p) | Rot-Weiss Oberhausen | Reutlingen |
| | Djappa 75'; Hoffmann 110' | Report (in German) | Judt 27'; Vier 95' | Stadium: Stadion an der Kreuzeiche; Attendance: 2,500; Referee: Peter Gagelmann (Bremen) |
| | Penalties |
| | Kovář (penalty scored); Schmiedel (penalty scored); Hoffmann (penalty missed); Djappa (penalty scored); Ćurko (penalty missed) | | Lipinski (penalty scored); Hayer (penalty scored); Judt (penalty scored); Vier (penalty scored) |

| 28 November 2001 | Werder Bremen (A) | 3–3 (a.e.t.) (2–4 p) | Eintracht Frankfurt | Bremen |
| | Mamoum 19'; Kern 46', 65' | Report (in German) | Ćirić 45', 72', 90' | Stadium: Sportpark Vinnenweg; Attendance: 1,000; Referee: Dirk Margenberg (Wermelskirchen) |
| | Penalties |
| | Schierenbeck (penalty scored); Schulz (penalty scored); Kern (penalty missed); Borel (penalty missed) | | Kryszałowicz (penalty missed); Ćirić (penalty scored); Rada (penalty scored); Skela (penalty scored); Bindewald (penalty scored) |

| 28 November 2001 | VfL Wolfsburg (A) | 0–4 | Hannover 96 | Wolfsburg |
| | | Report (in German) | Simak 11'; Kaufman 31', 42'; Däbritz 90' (pen.) | Attendance: 5,000; Referee: Stefan Weber (Emmerich) |

| 28 November 2001 | SSV Ulm 1846 | 0–3 | 1. FC Union Berlin | Ulm |
| | | Report (in German) | Fiél 78'; Đurković 80'; Menze 86' | Stadium: Donaustadion; Attendance: 5,500; Referee: Kammerer (Karlsruhe) |

| 11 December 2001 | VfL Bochum | 2–3 | Bayer Leverkusen | Bochum |
| | Freier 28'; Colding 75' | Report (in German) | Berbatov 27', 77', 90' | Stadium: Ruhrstadion; Attendance: 11,900; Referee: Wolfgang Stark (Ergolding) |

| 12 December 2001 | VfL Osnabrück | 0–2 | Bayern Munich | Osnabrück |
| | | Report (in German) | Jancker 49'; Scholl 62' | Stadium: Stadion an der Bremer Brücke; Attendance: 17,500; Referee: Lutz Wagner (Kriftel) |

=== Round of 16 ===
| 11 December 2001 | VfB Stuttgart | 2–2 (a.e.t.) (2–4 p) | 1860 München | Stuttgart |
| | Balakov 67' (pen.); Carnell 93' | Report (in German) | Pürk 7'; Šuker 103' | Stadium: Gottlieb-Daimler-Stadion; Attendance: 9,500; Referee: Michael Weiner (Giesen) |
| | Penalties |
| | Adhemar (penalty missed); Meißner (penalty scored); Soldo (penalty scored); Bordon (penalty missed) | | Wiesinger (penalty scored); Max (penalty scored); Šuker (penalty scored); Hoffmann (penalty scored) |

| 11 December 2001 | 1. FC Union Berlin | 1–2 | Rot-Weiss Oberhausen | Berlin |
| | Divić 86' | Report (in German) | Lipinski 41' (pen.); Hayer 89' | Stadium: Alte Försterei; Attendance: 5,200; Referee: Thorsten Kinhöfer (Herne) |

| 11 December 2001 | Mainz 05 | 2–3 | 1. FC Kaiserslautern | Mainz |
| | Babatz 71'; N'Kufo 84' (pen.) | Report (in German) | Lokvenc 23'; Lincoln 31', 42' | Stadium: Bruchwegstadion; Attendance: 15,500; Referee: Jürgen Aust (Cologne) |

| 12 December 2001 | Eintracht Frankfurt | 1–2 (a.e.t.) | Hertha BSC | Frankfurt |
| | Yang 22' | Report (in German) | Šimunić 76'; Dárdai 96' | Stadium: Waldstadion; Attendance: 10,000; Referee: Peter Sippel (Munich) |

| 12 December 2001 | KFC Uerdingen | 1–1 (a.e.t.) (3–5 p) | 1. FC Köln | Krefeld |
| | Rodríguez 72' | Report (in German) | Kurth 62' | Stadium: Grotenburg-Stadion; Attendance: 20,100; Referee: Knut Kircher (Rottenburg) |
| | Penalties |
| | Schmugge (penalty scored); Maaß (penalty scored); Rodríguez (penalty scored); Emerson (penalty missed) | | Keller (penalty scored); Baranek (penalty scored); Lottner (penalty scored); Donkov (penalty scored); Cichon (penalty scored) |

| 12 December 2001 | Darmstadt 98 | 0–1 (a.e.t.) | Schalke 04 | Darmstadt |
| | | Report (in German) | Sand 115' | Attendance: 25,000; Referee: Florian Meyer (Braunschweig) |

| 22 December 2001 | Hannover 96 | 1–2 | Bayer Leverkusen | Hannover |
| | Keita 47' | Report (in German) | Neuville 20'; Kirsten 47' | Stadium: Niedersachsenstadion; Attendance: 46,100; Referee: Lutz Michael Fröhlich (Berlin) |

| 23 December 2001 | Bayern Munich | 2–1 | VfL Wolfsburg | Munich |
| | Tarnat 43'; Giovane Élber 44' | Report (in German) | Ponte 13' | Stadium: Olympiastadion; Attendance: 4,000; Referee: Alfons Berg (Konz) |

=== Quarter-finals ===
| 30 January 2002 | Hertha BSC | 1–2 (a.e.t.) | 1. FC Köln | Berlin |
| | Goor 47' | Report (in German) | Zellweger 85'; Lottner 105' | Stadium: Olympiastadion; Attendance: 17,200; Referee: Hermann Albrecht (Kaufbeuren) |

| 30 January 2002 | Bayer Leverkusen | 3–0 | 1860 München | Leverkusen |
| | Berbatov 66', 73'; Brdarić 80' | Report (in German) | | Stadium: BayArena; Attendance: 17,000; Referee: Edgar Steinborn (Sinzig) |

| 30 January 2002 | Schalke 04 | 2–0 | Rot-Weiss Oberhausen | Gelsenkirchen |
| | Böhme 30' (pen.); Möller 86' | Report (in German) | | Stadium: Arena AufSchalke; Attendance: 54,600; Referee: Wolfgang Stark (Ergolding) |

| 30 January 2002 | 1. FC Kaiserslautern | 0–0 (a.e.t.) (3–5 p) | Bayern Munich | Kaiserslautern |
| | | Report (in German) | | Stadium: Betzenberg; Attendance: 37,600; Referee: Jürgen Jansen (Essen) |
| | Penalties |
| | Koch (penalty scored); Hengen (penalty scored); Bjelica (penalty missed); Hristov (penalty scored) | | Effenberg (penalty scored); Jeremies (penalty scored); Hargreaves (penalty scored); Scholl (penalty scored); Pizarro (penalty scored) |

=== Semi-finals ===
| 5 March 2002 | Bayer Leverkusen | 3–1 (a.e.t.) | 1. FC Köln | Leverkusen |
| | Zellweger 59' (o.g.); Živković 100'; Schneider 114' | Report (in German) | Song 90' | Stadium: BayArena; Attendance: 22,500; Referee: Markus Merk (Otterbach) |

| 6 March 2002 | Schalke 04 | 2–0 (a.e.t.) | Bayern Munich | Gelsenkirchen |
| | Van Hoogdalem 100'; Böhme 115' | Report (in German) | | Stadium: Arena AufSchalke; Attendance: 60,700; Referee: Herbert Fandel (Kyllburg) |

=== Final ===
11 May 2002
19:45 CEST

| Schalke 04 | 4–2 | Bayer Leverkusen |
|---|---|---|
| Böhme 45'; Agali 68'; Möller 71'; Sand 85' | Report | Berbatov 27'; Kirsten 89' |

Olympiastadion, Berlin
Attendance: 70,000
Referee: Franz-Xaver Wack (Biberbach)
