= 1995–96 FC Bayern Munich season =

95th season in existence of Bayern Munich

FC Bayern Munich
1995–96 season
- Manager: Otto Rehhagel; Franz Beckenbauer (from 29 April)
- Stadium: Olympiastadion
- Bundesliga: 2nd
- DFB-Pokal: Second round
- UEFA Cup: Winners
- Top goalscorer: League: Jürgen Klinsmann (16); All: Jürgen Klinsmann (31)
Home colours	Away colours	Third colours

The 1995–96 Bayern Munich season was their 95th season of existence and 31st Bundesliga season.

== Review and events ==
Bayern Munich appointed Werder Bremen manager Otto Rehhagel to try to improve on the club's disappointing sixth-place finish the previous season. Several players, including Jürgen Klinsmann and Andreas Herzog, were purchased and it was widely expected that Munich would steamroll the opposition; but from the very start Rehhagel clashed with the team and the team environment, his single-minded and eccentric ways, incompatible with those at Bayern. Moreover, Rehhagel's old-fashioned tactics and patronising of the players caused major antipathy in the Bayern team, especially from Klinsmann, who never missed an opportunity to criticise Rehhagel. The team disintegrated in the second half of the season. Rehhagel was dismissed three weeks before they were to play in the UEFA Cup final, after a disappointing end to their league campaign. He was replaced by Franz Beckenbauer, who led the team to victory in the UEFA Cup.

== Match results ==
=== Legend ===
Win Draw Loss

=== Friendlies ===
==== Fuji-Cup ====
25 July Semifinals	Bayern Munich	1–1 (7–6 p)	SV Werder Bremen	Augsburg
	Strunz 61'		Hobsch 36'

27 July Final	Bayern Munich	3–2	Borussia Dortmund	Koblenz
	Nerlinger 58'; Klinsmann 65' (pen.), 82'		Franck 34'; Möller 38' (pen.)

==== Cartagineses y Romanos Trophy ====
14 August Final	Deportivo de La Coruña	7–0	Bayern Munich	Cartagena, Spain
	Bebeto 5', 35', 51'; Fran 8', 66'; Begiristain 53'; Aldana 62'

=== Bundesliga ===
==== Results by round ====
Round	1	2	3	4	5	6	7	8	9	10	11	12	13	14	15	16	17	18	19	20	21	22	23	24	25	26	27	28	29	30	31	32	33	34
Ground	H	A	H	A	H	A	H	A	H	A	H	A	A	H	A	H	A	A	H	A	H	A	H	A	H	A	H	A	H	H	A	H	A	H
Result	W	W	W	W	W	W	W	L	L	W	W	L	D	W	D	W	W	L	L	W	W	L	W	W	W	L	D	W	D	L	L	W	L	D
Position	2	1	1	1	1	1	1	1	1	1	1	2	2	2	2	2	2	2	2	2	2	2	2	2	2	2	2	2	2	2	2	2	2	2

Source: Competitive Matches
A = Away; H = Home; W = Win; D = Draw; L = Loss

==== League results ====
Match	Date	Ground	Opponent	Score^{1}	Pos.	Pts.	GD	Report
1	12 August	H	Hamburger SV	3 – 2	2	3	1	Report / Report link; Kick off / 15:30 CEST; Attendance / 63,000 (sell-out); Referee / Georg Dardenne; Bayern Munich / Hamburger SV; Herzog 31'; Helmer 50'; Scholl 68'; Ziege (yellow card) / Spörl 2' (yellow card); Fischer 74'; Schnoor (yellow card); Kmetsch (yellow card); Albertz (yellow card)
2	19 August	A	Karlsruher SC	6 – 2	1	6	5	Report / Report link; Kick off / 15:30 CEST; Attendance / 33,800 (sell-out); Referee / Bernd Heynemann; Karlsruher SC / Bayern Munich; Knup 37', 80'; Bilić (yellow card); Schmitt (yellow card); Schuster (yellow card) / Ziege 13'; Kreuzer 17' (yellow card); Zickler 23', 80'; Hamann 57' (yellow card); Scholl 68' (pen.)
3	30 August	H	KFC Uerdingen (Germany)	2 – 0	1	9	7	Report / Report link; Kick off / 20:00 CEST; Attendance / 45,000; Referee / Lutz Pohlmann; Bayern Munich / KFC Uerdingen; Papin 27'; Helmer 70'; Strunz (yellow card) / Laeßig (yellow card); Meijer (yellow card)
4	2 September	A	1860 Munich (Germany)	2 – 0	1	12	9	Report / Report link; Kick off / 15:30 CEST; Attendance / 70,800; Referee / Hans-Jürgen Weber; 1860 Munich / Bayern Munich; Schwabl (yellow card) / Ziege 74' (yellow card); Nerlinger 87'; Helmer (yellow card); Hamann (yellow card)
5	9 September	H	SC Freiburg (Germany)	2 – 0	1	15	11	Report / Report link; Kick off / 15:30 CEST; Attendance / 63,000 (sell-out); Referee / Michael Malbranc; Bayern Munich / SC Freiburg; Klinsmann 10', 89'; Babbel (yellow card); Ziege (yellow card); Helmer (yellow card) / Heidenreich (yellow card)
6	15 September	A	1. FC Kaiserslautern	3 – 2	1	18	12	Report / Report link; Kick off / 20:00 CEST; Attendance / 38,000 (sell-out); Referee / Hartmut Strampe; 1. FC Kaiserslautern / Bayern Munich; Brehme 20' (pen.); Hengen 56'; Schäfer (yellow card); Ritter (yellow card) / Babbel 13', 87'; Sforza 45'; Kreuzer (yellow card); Zickler (yellow card); Kahn (yellow card)
7	23 September	H	Bayer Leverkusen (Germany)	1 – 0	1	21	13	Report / Report link; Kick off / 15:30 CEST; Attendance / 63,000 (sell-out); Referee / Hans-Jürgen Kasper; Bayern Munich / Bayer Leverkusen; Klinsmann 89' (pen.); Ziege (yellow card); Kreuzer (yellow card); Sforza (yellow card) / Lupescu (yellow card); Paulo Sérgio (yellow card); Wörns (yellow card)
8	1 October	A	Borussia Dortmund	1 – 3	1	21	11	Report / Report link; Kick off / 20:15 CET; Attendance / 42,800 (sell-out); Referee / Edgar Steinborn; Borussia Dortmund / Bayern Munich; Reuter 41' (pen.); Sosa 79'; Zorc 82'; Sammer (yellow card) / Nerlinger 49'; Strunz (yellow card); Babbel (yellow card); Kostadinov (yellow card); Ziege (yellow card)
9	14 October	H	Borussia Mönchengladbach	1 – 2	1	21	10	Report / Report link; Kick off / 15:30 CET; Attendance / 63,000 (sell-out); Referee / Bernd Heynemann; Bayern Munich / Borussia Mönchengladbach; Papin 88'; Strunz (yellow card); Sforza (yellow card) / Effenberg 20'; Herzog 82' (o.g.); Neun (yellow card)
10	21 October	A	FC St. Pauli	1 – 0	1	24	11	Report / Report link; Kick off / 15:30 CET; Attendance / 20,594 (sell-out); Referee / Georg Dardenne; FC St. Pauli / Bayern Munich; Schlindwein (yellow card) / Klinsmann 10'; Papin (yellow card); Strunz (yellow card)
11	28 October	H	VfB Stuttgart	5 – 3	1	27	13	Report / Report link; Kick off / 15:30 CET; Attendance / 63,000 (sell-out); Referee / Hans-Jürgen Weber; Bayern Munich / VfB Stuttgart; Strunz 45'; Zickler 49', 85'; Scholl 63' (pen.), 90' (pen.); Helmer (yellow card) / Kruse 77'; Élber 79', 84' (yellow card); Poschner (yellow card); Berthold (yellow card); Foda (yellow card); Ziegler (yellow card)
12	4 November	A	Eintracht Frankfurt	1 – 4	2	27	10	Report / Report link; Kick off / 15:30 CET; Attendance / 57,300 (sell-out); Referee / Jürgen Aust; Eintracht Frankfurt / Bayern Munich; Hagner 6', 74'; Mornar 28' (red card) 65'; Binz 87'; Schupp (yellow card) / Helmer 52' (yellow card); Babbel (yellow card); Nerlinger (yellow card); Hamann (yellow card)
13	10 November	A	Hansa Rostock	0 – 0	2	28	10	Report / Report link; Kick off / 19:30 CET; Attendance / 25,700 (sell-out); Referee / Alfons Berg; Hansa Rostock / Bayern Munich; Schneider (yellow card) / Helmer (yellow card); Kreuzer (yellow card)
14	18 November	H	Werder Bremen	2 – 0	2	31	12	Report / Report link; Kick off / 15:30 CET; Attendance / 63,000 (sell-out); Referee / Hellmut Krug; Bayern Munich / Werder Bremen; Klinsmann 6'; Zickler 86'; Sforza (yellow card); Scholl (yellow card); Herzog (yellow card) / Cardoso (yellow card); Ramzy (yellow card); Neubarth (yellow card); Schulz (yellow card)
15	26 November	A	1. FC Köln	0 – 0	2	32	12	Report / Report link; Kick off / 18:00 CET; Attendance / 54,000(sell-out); Referee / Lutz Michael Fröhlich; 1. FC Köln / Bayern Munich; Oliseh (yellow card); Kohn (yellow card); Janßen (yellow card) / Kostadinov (yellow card); Scholl (yellow card); Zickler (yellow card); Kreuzer (yellow card); Nerlinger (yellow card)
16	2 December	H	Schalke 04	4 – 0	2	35	16	Report / Report link; Kick off / 15:30 CET; Attendance / 61,000; Referee / Bernhard Zerr; Bayern Munich / Schalke 04; Sforza 21'; Scholl 55'; Nerlinger 62'; Kostadinov 85' / Mulder (yellow card)
17	9 December	A	Fortuna Düsseldorf	2 – 0	2	38	18	Report / Report link; Kick off / 15:30 CET; Attendance / 55,850(sell-out); Referee / Dr. Markus Merk; Fortuna Düsseldorf / Bayern Munich; Winkhold (red card) 86' / Hamann 46'; Klinsmann 86' (pen.); Matthäus (yellow card); Strunz (yellow card)
18	11 February	A	Hamburger SV	1 – 2	2	38	17	Report / Report link; Kick off / 20:00 CET; Attendance / 57,000 (sell-out); Referee / Bernd Heynemann; Hamburger SV / Bayern Munich; Breitenreiter 85'; Jähnig 88'; Hollerbach (yellow card) / Scholl 28'; Ziege (yellow card); Zickler (yellow card)
19	17 February	H	Karlsruher SC	1 – 4	2	38	14	Report / Report link; Kick off / 15:30 CET; Attendance / 35,000; Referee / Hartmut Strampe; Bayern Munich / Karlsruher SC; Scholl 54'; Herzog (yellow card); Babbel (yellow card) / Dundee 15', 50'; Bender 72', 78'; Fink (yellow card); Kiriakov (yellow card)
20	25 February	A	KFC Uerdingen (Germany)	6 – 1	2	41	19	Report / Report link; Kick off / 18:00 CET; Attendance / 30,000; Referee / Günther Habermann; KFC Uerdingen / Bayern Munich; Meijer 86'; Rahner (yellow card) / Helmer 19' (yellow card); Strunz 52', 88'; Klinsmann 57'; Zickler 61'; Scholl 86'; Matthäus (yellow card)
21	2 March	H	1860 Munich (Germany)	4 – 2	1	44	21	Report / Report link; Kick off / 15:30 CET; Attendance / 69,000 (sell-out); Referee / Jürgen Jansen; Bayern Munich / 1860 Munich; Klinsmann 7', 26'; Zickler 9', 20'; Kahn (red card) 42'; Strunz (yellow card) / Bodden 33' (red card) 42'; Winkler 64'; Trares (yellow card); Schwabl (yellow card); Hamann (yellow card)
22	9 March	A	SC Freiburg (Germany)	1 – 3	2	44	19	Report / Report link; Kick off / 15:30 CET; Attendance / 22,500 (sell-out); Referee / Georg Dardenne; SC Freiburg / Bayern Munich; Decheiver 43', 51'; Todt 88'; Zeyer (yellow card) / Jürgen Klinsmann 15' (pen.); Helmer (red card) 89'; Kreuzer (yellow card); Witeczek (yellow card); Matthäus (yellow card)
23	16 March	H	1. FC Kaiserslautern	2 – 0	2	47	21	Report / Report link; Kick off / 15:30 CET; Attendance / 61,000; Referee / Hans-Jürgen Weber; Bayern Munich / 1. FC Kaiserslautern; Herzog 12'; Ziege 67'; Scholl (yellow card) 87' (red card) / Koch (yellow card) 53' (red card); Wagner (yellow card)
24	23 March	A	Bayer Leverkusen (Germany)	2 – 1	2	50	22	Report / Report link; Kick off / 15:30 CET; Attendance / 26,500 (sell-out); Referee / Edgar Steinborn; Bayer Leverkusen / Bayern Munich; Paulo Sérgio 41'; Fach (yellow card) / Nerlinger 40'; Matthäus 54' (yellow card); Frey (yellow card); Kahn (yellow card)
25	30 March	H	Borussia Dortmund	1 – 0	1	53	23	Report / Report link; Kick off / 20:00 CET; Attendance / 63,000 (sell-out); Referee / Dr. Markus Merk; Bayern Munich / Borussia Dortmund; Scholl 37'; Kreuzer (yellow card); Nerlinger (yellow card); Matthäus (yellow card) / Freund (yellow card); Sammer (yellow card); Kohler (yellow card)
26	7 April	A	Borussia Mönchengladbach	1 – 3	1	53	21	Report / Report link; Kick off / 20:00 CEST; Attendance / 34,500 (sell-out); Referee / Bernd Heynemann; Borussia Mönchengladbach / Bayern Munich; Pettersson 21', 43'; Wynhoff 88'; Hochstätter (yellow card) / Klinsmann 34'; Kreuzer (yellow card); Ziege (yellow card)
27	10 April	H	FC St. Pauli	1 – 1	1	54	21	Report / Report link; Kick off / 20:00 CEST; Attendance / 46,000; Referee / Rainer Werthmann; Bayern Munich / FC St. Pauli; Klinsmann 89'; Scholl (yellow card) / Schweißing 43'; Driller (yellow card); Scharping (yellow card)
28	13 April	A	VfB Stuttgart	1 – 0	1	57	22	Report / Report link; Kick off / 15:30 CEST; Attendance / 53,218 (sell-out); Referee / Hellmut Krug; VfB Stuttgart / Bayern Munich; Bochtler (yellow card); Foda (yellow card); Berthold (yellow card); Schneider (yellow card) / Hamann (red card) 30'; Klinsmann 48'; Kahn (yellow card); Witeczek (yellow card)
29	20 April	H	Eintracht Frankfurt	1 – 1	1	58	22	Report / Report link; Kick off / 15:30 CEST; Attendance / 63,000 (sell-out); Referee / Lutz Michael Fröhlich; Bayern Munich / Eintracht Frankfurt; Scholl 47'; Nerlinger (yellow card); Helmer (yellow card); Ziege (yellow card) / Hagner 29'
30	27 April	H	Hansa Rostock	0 – 1	2	58	21	Report / Report link; Kick off / 15:30 CEST; Attendance / 62,000; Referee / Jürgen Aust; Bayern Munich / Hansa Rostock; Ziege (yellow card); Matthäus (yellow card); Strunz (yellow card); Sforza (yellow card) / Akpoborie 63'; Zallmann (yellow card); Studer (yellow card)
32	4 May	H	1. FC Köln	3 – 2	2	61	22	Report / Report link; Kick off / 15:30 CEST; Attendance / 63,000 (sell-out); Referee / Bernhard Zerr; Bayern Munich / 1. FC Köln; Kostadinov 4', 61'; Klinsmann 53' / Matthäus 48' (o.g.); Polster 73' (pen.)
31	7 May	A	Werder Bremen	2 – 3	2	61	21	Report / Report link; Kick off / 20:00 CEST; Attendance / 29,600 (sell-out); Referee / Edgar Steinborn; Werder Bremen / Bayern Munich; Hobsch 42'; Bode 50', 65'; Scholz (yellow card) / Kostadinov 14', 23'; Sforza (yellow card)
33	11 May	A	Schalke 04	1 – 2	2	61	20	Report / Report link; Kick off / 15:30 CEST; Attendance / 70,960 (sell-out); Referee / Hartmut Strampe; Schalke 04 / Bayern Munich; Thon 36'; Müller 90' (yellow card) / Strunz 45' (yellow card)
34	18 May	H	Fortuna Düsseldorf	2 – 2	2	62	20	Report / Report link; Kick off / 15:30 CEST; Attendance / 63,000 (sell-out); Referee / Lutz Wagner; Bayern Munich / Fortuna Düsseldorf; Klinsmann 72', 83'; Scholl (yellow card); Ziege (yellow card); Strunz (yellow card) / Judt 6'; Cyroń 25'; Werner (red card) 56'; Istenič (yellow card)

^{1}Bayern Munich goals come first.
Ground's country's flag and opponent's country's flag shown when from a different country of Bayern Munich.
Pos. = Position in league, Pts. = Points, GD = Goal difference, Ground: H = Home, A = Away, N = Neutral, HR = Home replacement, AR = Away replacement.

==== League standings ====
Pos	Team	Pld	W	D	L	GF	GA	GD	Pts	Qualification or relegation
1	Borussia Dortmund (C)	34	19	11	4	76	38	+38	68	Qualification to Champions League group stage
2	Bayern Munich	34	19	5	10	66	46	+20	62	Qualification to UEFA Cup first round
3	Schalke 04	34	14	14	6	45	36	+9	56	Qualification to UEFA Cup first round
4	Borussia Mönchengladbach	34	15	8	11	52	51	+1	53	Qualification to UEFA Cup first round
5	Hamburger SV	34	12	14	8	52	47	+5	50	Qualification to UEFA Cup first round

Source: www.dfb.de
Rules for classification: 1) points; 2) goal difference; 3) number of goals scored.
(C) Champions

=== DFB-Pokal ===
27 August 1995 First round	Stuttgarter Kickers	0–1	Bayern Munich	Stuttgart
20:20			Babbel 39'	Stadium: Waldau-Stadion; Attendance: 25,000; Referee: Markus Merk (Otterbach)

18 September 1995 Second round	Fortuna Düsseldorf	3–1	Bayern Munich	Düsseldorf
19:45	Pančev 22'; Cyroń 79'; Seeliger 90'		Helmer 73'	Stadium: Rheinstadion; Attendance: 45,000; Referee: Alfons Berg (Konz)

=== UEFA Cup ===
==== First round ====
12 September 1995 1st leg	Bayern Munich (Germany)	0–1	(Russia) Lokomotiv Moscow	Munich, Germany
			Kharlachyov 70'	Stadium: Olympic Stadium; Attendance: 16,000; Referee: Guy Goethals (Belgium)

26 September 1995 2nd leg	Lokomotiv Moscow (Russia)	0–5	(Germany) Bayern Munich	Moscow, Russia
			Klinsmann 26', 35'; Herzog 39'; Scholl 45'; Strunz 78'	Stadium: Lokomotiv Stadium; Attendance: 20,000; Referee: Kim Milton Nielsen (Denmark)

==== Second round ====
17 October 1995 1st leg	Raith Rovers (Scotland)	0–2	(Germany) Bayern Munich	Edinburgh, Scotland
			Klinsmann 6', 73'	Stadium: Easter Road; Attendance: 14,500; Referee: Remy Harrel (France)

31 October 1995 2nd leg	Bayern Munich (Germany)	2–1	(Scotland) Raith Rovers	Munich, Germany
	Klinsmann 50'; Babbel 64'		Herzog 43' (o.g.)	Stadium: Olympic Stadium; Attendance: 27,000; Referee: Vasyl Melnychuk (Ukraine)

==== Third round ====
21 November 1995 1st leg	Bayern Munich (Germany)	4–1	(Portugal) Benfica	Munich, Germany
	Klinsmann 26', 31', 44', 46'		Dimas 30'	Stadium: Olympic Stadium; Attendance: 30,000; Referee: Dermot Gallagher (England)

5 December 1995 2nd leg	Benfica (Portugal)	1–3	(Germany) Bayern Munich	Lisbon, Portugal
	Valdo 14'		Klinsmann 32', 68'; Herzog 83'	Stadium: Estádio da Luz; Attendance: 20,000; Referee: Peter Mikkelsen (Denmark)

==== Quarterfinals ====
5 March 1996 1st leg	Bayern Munich (Germany)	2–1	(England) Nottingham Forest	Munich, Germany
	Klinsmann 16'; Scholl 44'		Chettle 17'	Stadium: Olympic Stadium; Attendance: 38,000; Referee: Antonio Jesús López Nieto (Spain)

19 March 1996 2nd leg	Nottingham Forest (England)	1–5	(Germany) Bayern Munich	Nottingham, England
	Stone 85'		Ziege 30'; Strunz 43'; Klinsmann 65', 79'; Papin 73'	Stadium: City Ground; Attendance: 28,800; Referee: Piero Ceccarini (Italy)

==== Semifinals ====
2 April 1996 1st leg	Bayern Munich (Germany)	2–2	(Spain) Barcelona	Munich, Germany
	Witeczek 52'; Scholl 57'		Óscar 14'; Hagi 77'	Stadium: Olympic Stadium; Attendance: 63,000; Referee: Michel Piraux (Belgium)

16 April 1996 2nd leg	Barcelona (Spain)	1–2	(Germany) Bayern Munich	Barcelona, Spain
	De la Peña 89'		Babbel 40'; Witeczek 84'	Stadium: Camp Nou; Attendance: 115,000; Referee: Atanas Ouzounov (Bulgaria)

==== Final ====
1 May 1996 1st leg	Bayern Munich (Germany)	2–0	(France) Bordeaux	Munich, Germany
	Helmer 34'; Scholl 60'			Stadium: Olympic Stadium; Attendance: 63,000; Referee: Serge Muhmenthaler (Switzerland)

15 May 1996 2nd leg	Bordeaux (France)	1–3	(Germany) Bayern Munich	Bordeaux, France
	Dutuel 75'		Scholl 53'; Kostadinov 66'; Klinsmann 78'	Stadium: Stade Chaban-Delmas; Attendance: 36,000; Referee: Vadim Zhuk (Belarus)

== Player information ==
=== Transfers ===
==== In ====
No.	Pos.	Nat.	Name	Age	EU	Moving from	Type	Transfer window	Ends	Transfer fee	Source
14	MF	(Switzerland)	Ciriaco Sforza	25	Non-EU	1. FC Kaiserslautern	Transfer	Summer		€3.3 Million	
20	MF	(Austria)	Andreas Herzog	26	EU	Werder Bremen	Transfer	Summer		€2.54 Million	
8	MF	(Germany)	Thomas Strunz	27	EU	VfB Stuttgart	Transfer	Summer		€2.5 Million	
18	FW	(Germany)	Jürgen Klinsmann	30	EU	Tottenham Hotspur (England)	Transfer	Summer		€1.4 Million	

==== Out ====
No.	Pos.	Nat.	Name	Age	EU	Moving to	Type	Transfer window	Transfer fee	Source
	DF	(Ghana)	Samuel Kuffour	19	EU	1. FC Nürnberg	Loan	Winter	N/A	
	MF	(Switzerland)	Alain Sutter	27	Non-EU	SC Freiburg	Transfer	Summer	€1.25 Million	
	MF	(Germany)	Markus Schupp	29	EU	Eintracht Frankfurt	Transfer	Summer	€1 Million	
	MF	(Germany)	Michael Sternkopf	25	EU	Borussia Mönchengladbach	Transfer	Summer	€800,000	
	DF	(Germany)	Marco Grimm	23	EU	VfB Stuttgart	Transfer	Summer	€75,000	
	GK	(Germany)	Uwe Gospodarek	21	EU	VfL Bochum	Transfer	Summer	Free	

=== Roster & statistics ===
Squad Season 1995–96
Player					Bundesliga		DFB-Pokal		UEFA Cup		Totals	
Player	Nat.	Birthday	at Bayern since	Previous club	Matches	Goals	Matches	Goal	Matches	Goals	Matches	Goals
Goalkeepers
Oliver Kahn	German	June 15, 1969 (aged 26)	1994	Karlsruher SC	32	0	2	0	12	0	46	0
Michael Probst	German	November 20, 1962 (aged 32)	1995	SV Lohhof	2	0	0	0	0	0	2	0
Sven Scheuer	German	January 19, 1971 (aged 24)	1989	Youth Team	2	0	0	0	0	0	2	0
Defenders
Thomas Helmer	German	April 21, 1965 (aged 30)	1992	Borussia Dortmund	32	4	2	1	12	1	46	6
Markus Babbel	German	November 20, 1972 (aged 22)	1981	Youth Team	30	2	2	1	9	2	41	5
Oliver Kreuzer	German	November 13, 1965 (aged 29)	1991	Karlsruher SC	19	1	0	0	8	0	27	1
Lothar Matthäus	German	March 21, 1961 (aged 34)	1992	Internazionale	19	1	0	0	7	0	26	1
Dieter Frey	German	October 31, 1972 (aged 22)	1992	FC Augsburg	8	0	0	0	6	0	14	0
Roman Grill	German	March 1, 1966 (aged 29)	1988	FC Miesbach	0	0	0	0	1	0	1	0
Midfielders
Christian Ziege	German	February 1, 1972 (aged 23)	1989	Hertha Zehlendorf	33	3	1	0	10	1	44	4
Mehmet Scholl	German	October 16, 1970 (aged 24)	1992	Karlsruher SC	30	10	2	0	11	5	43	15
Ciriaco Sforza	Swiss	March 2, 1970 (aged 25)	1995	1. FC Kaiserslautern	30	2	2	0	12	0	44	2
Andreas Herzog	Austrian	September 10, 1968 (aged 26)	1995	Werder Bremen	28	2	2	0	7	2	37	4
Christian Nerlinger	German	April 21, 1973 (aged 22)	1986	Youth Team	28	4	2	0	8	0	38	4
Thomas Strunz	German	April 25, 1968 (aged 27)	1995	VfB Stuttgart	24	3	2	0	9	2	35	5
Dietmar Hamann	German	August 27, 1973 (aged 21)	1989	Youth Team	20	2	2	0	7	0	29	2
Marcel Witeczek	German	October 18, 1968 (aged 26)	1993	1. FC Kaiserslautern	20	0	1	0	8	2	29	2
Alain Sutter (to September)	Swiss	January 22, 1968 (aged 27)	1994	1. FC Nürnberg	0	0	0	0	1	0	1	0
Forwards
Jürgen Klinsmann	German	July 30, 1964 (aged 30)	1995	Tottenham Hotspur	32	16	1	0	12	15	45	31
Alexander Zickler	German	February 28, 1974 (aged 21)	1993	Dynamo Dresden	25	8	2	0	8	0	35	8
Jean-Pierre Papin	French	November 5, 1963 (aged 31)	1994	Milan	20	2	2	0	12	0	34	2
Emil Kostadinov	Bulgarian	August 12, 1967 (aged 27)	1995	Porto	18	5	2	0	12	1	32	5

=== Bookings ===
No.	Player	Bundesliga			DFB-Pokal			UEFA Cup			Total		
No.	Player	Yellow card	(yellow card) (red card)	Red card	Yellow card	(yellow card) (red card)	Red card	Yellow card	(yellow card) (red card)	Red card	Yellow card	(yellow card) (red card)	Red card
17	Christian Ziege	11	0	0	0	0	0	3	0	0	14	0	0
8	Thomas Strunz	9	0	0	0	0	0	2	0	0	11	0	0
5	Thomas Helmer	7	0	1	0	0	0	2	0	0	9	0	1
4	Oliver Kreuzer	8	0	0	0	0	0	0	0	0	8	0	0
10	Lothar Matthäus	6	0	0	0	0	0	1	0	0	7	0	0
7	Mehmet Scholl	4	1	0	1	0	0	1	0	0	6	1	0
2	Markus Babbel	4	0	0	0	0	0	2	0	0	6	0	0
6	Christian Nerlinger	3	0	0	2	0	0	1	0	0	6	0	0
14	Ciriaco Sforza	5	0	0	0	0	0	1	0	0	6	0	0
16	Dietmar Hamann	3	0	1	0	0	0	2	0	0	5	0	1
21	Alexander Zickler	3	0	0	0	0	0	1	0	0	4	0	0
1	Oliver Kahn	3	0	1	0	0	0	0	0	0	3	0	1
3	Dieter Frey	1	0	0	0	0	0	1	0	0	2	0	0
9	Jean-Pierre Papin	0	0	0	0	0	0	2	0	0	2	0	0
19	Emil Kostadinov	2	0	0	0	0	0	0	0	0	2	0	0
20	Andreas Herzog	2	0	0	0	0	0	0	0	0	2	0	0
11	Marcel Witeczek	1	0	0	0	0	0	0	0	0	1	0	0
18	Jürgen Klinsmann	0	0	0	0	0	0	1	0	0	1	0	0
Totals		72	1	3	3	0	0	20	0	0	95	1	3

=== Suspensions ===
No.	Player	No. of matches served	Reason	Competition served in	Date served	Opponent(s)	Source
17	Christian Ziege	1	5th yellow card	Bundesliga	14 October	Borussia Mönchengladbach	
5	Thomas Helmer	1	5th yellow card	Bundesliga	18 November	Werder Bremen	
4	Oliver Kreuzer	1	5th yellow card	Bundesliga	2 December	Schalke 04	
8	Thomas Strunz	1	5th yellow card	Bundesliga	11 February	Hamburger SV	
1	Oliver Kahn	1	Red card vs 1860 Munich	Bundesliga	9 March	SC Freiburg	
5	Thomas Helmer	1	Red card vs SC Freiburg	Bundesliga	16 March	1. FC Kaiserslautern	
7	Mehmet Scholl	1	Red card vs 1. FC Kaiserslautern	Bundesliga	23 March	Bayer Leverkusen	
10	Lothar Matthäus	1	5th yellow card	Bundesliga	7 April	Borussia Mönchengladbach	
16	Dietmar Hamann	1	Red card vs VfB Stuttgart	Bundesliga	20 April	Eintracht Frankfurt	
14	Ciriaco Sforza	1	5th yellow card	Bundesliga	11 May	Schalke 04	

=== Minutes played ===
No.	Player	Total	Bundesliga	DFB-Pokal	UEFA Cup
5	Thomas Helmer	4,023	2,776	180	1,067
1	Oliver Kahn	4,006	2,746	180	1080
18	Jürgen Klinsmann	3,892	2,722	90	1080
17	Christian Ziege	3,860	2,870	90	900
14	Ciriaco Sforza	3,852	2,695	180	977
2	Markus Babbel	3,615	2,669	180	766
7	Mehmet Scholl	3,199	2,117	134	948
8	Thomas Strunz	2,921	2,144	180	597
6	Christian Nerlinger	2,755	1,980	180	595
21	Alexander Zickler	2,406	1,698	171	537
20	Andreas Herzog	2,315	1,759	136	420
10	Lothar Matthäus	2,096	1,559	0	537
4	Oliver Kreuzer	1,904	1,354	0	550
9	Jean-Pierre Papin	1,441	979	90	372
16	Dietmar Hamann	1,405	1,269	136	0
11	Marcel Witeczek	973	589	44	340
19	Emil Kostadinov	972	756	9	207
3	Dieter Frey	610	346	0	264
12	Sven Scheuer	138	138	0	0
23	Michael Probst	134	134	0	0
	Alain Sutter	44	0	0	44
	Roman Grill	3	0	0	3
