= 1999–2000 Regionalliga =

6th season of the Regionalliga as a third-level league

Regionalliga
- Season: 1999–2000
- Champions: VfL Osnabrück (N); 1. FC Union Berlin (NO); 1. FC Saarbrücken (W/SW); SSV Reutlingen (S)
- Promoted: 1. FC Saarbrücken; SSV Reutlingen; VfL Osnabrück; LR Ahlen
- Relegated: 39 teams

The 1999–2000 Regionalliga was the sixth season of the Regionalliga as the third tier of German football. It was also the last season to be competed in four divisions. Teams were not only competing for promotion to the 2. Bundesliga, but also to qualify for the new two-division Regionalliga.

As in the previous seasons there were four divisions: Nord, Nordost, West/Südwest and Süd. Each division comprised 18 teams, with the exception of the West/Südwest division that had 20.

== Nord ==
VfL Osnabrück was promoted to 2nd Bundesliga by beating 1. FC Union Berlin in the play-offs.

VfB Lübeck, Eintracht Braunschweig, SV Wilhelmshaven, SV Werder Bremen Amateure and Lüneburger SK qualified for the new two-division Regionalliga.

=== Final table ===
The remaining teams were relegated to the Oberliga.

Pos	Team	Pld	W	D	L	GF	GA	GD	Pts	Qualification or relegation
1	VfL Osnabrück (C, P)	34	22	8	4	69	34	+35	74	Qualification to promotion play-offs
2	VfB Lübeck	34	21	7	6	74	34	+40	70	
3	Eintracht Braunschweig	34	20	9	5	69	28	+41	69	
4	SV Wilhelmshaven	34	21	5	8	62	38	+24	68	
5	Werder Bremen (A)	34	18	9	7	68	38	+30	63	
6	Lüneburger SK (R)	34	18	6	10	60	38	+22	60	Qualification to relegation play-offs
7	BV Cloppenburg (R)	34	14	13	7	73	58	+15	55	Relegation to Oberliga
8	Holstein Kiel (R)	34	14	9	11	62	57	+5	51	Relegation to Oberliga
9	1. SC Göttingen 05 (R)	34	13	6	15	58	63	−5	45	Relegation to Oberliga
10	Arminia Hannover (R)	34	10	11	13	53	51	+2	41	Relegation to Oberliga
11	SV Meppen (R)	34	10	11	13	57	57	0	41	Relegation to Oberliga
12	1. SC Norderstedt (R)	34	10	6	18	47	64	−17	36	Relegation to Oberliga
13	Eintracht Nordhorn (R)	34	11	3	20	54	76	−22	36	Relegation to Oberliga
14	TuS Celle FC (R)	34	9	8	17	39	65	−26	35	Relegation to Oberliga
15	FC St. Pauli (A) (R)	34	9	7	18	44	67	−23	34	Relegation to Oberliga
16	Hamburger SV (A) (R)	34	9	4	21	45	68	−23	31	Relegation to Oberliga
17	FC Bremerhaven (R)	34	7	6	21	39	82	−43	27	Relegation to Oberliga
18	VfB Oldenburg (R)	34	4	4	26	28	83	−55	16	Relegation to Oberliga

(C) Champions; (P) Promoted; (R) Relegated

=== Top scorers ===
#	Player	Club	Goals
1.	(Germany) Daniel Bärwolf	VfB Lübeck	25
1.	(Germany) Marinus Bester	Lüneburger SK	25
3.	(Germany) Horst Elberfeld	BV Cloppenburg	25
4.	(Germany) Christian Claaßen	VfL Osnabrück	18
5.	(Poland) Jacek Janiak	VfL Osnabrück	17
5.	(Romania) Ioan Perdei	1. SC Göttingen 05	17
7.	(Germany) Markus Erdmann	Arminia Hannover	16
4.	(Germany) Jörg Ahrends	Holstein Kiel	13
4.	(Germany) Uwe Harttgen	Werder Bremen (A)	13
4.	(Republic of the Congo) Joakim N'Tsika-Compaigne	Hamburger SV (A)	13
4.	(Germany) Mark Pomorin	FC St. Pauli (A)	13
4.	(Slovakia) Stefan Rusnak	BV Cloppenburg	13
4.	(Germany) Dirk Weetendorf	Eintracht Braunschweig	13

== Nordost ==
1. FC Union Berlin remains in the Regionalliga, as the club could not secure promotion in the play-off against VfL Osnabrück.

1. FC Union Berlin took part in the play-offs against LR Ahlen and SC Pfullendorf, but could not win promotion.

Dresdner SC, FC Erzgebirge Aue, FC Carl Zeiss Jena, SV Babelsberg 03, FC Sachsen Leipzig and Rot-Weiß Erfurt qualified for the new two-division Regionalliga.

=== Final table ===
The remaining teams were relegated to the Oberliga.

Pos	Team	Pld	W	D	L	GF	GA	GD	Pts	Qualification or relegation
1	1. FC Union Berlin (C)	34	23	8	3	53	23	+30	77	Qualification to promotion play-offs
2	Dresdner SC	34	17	9	8	65	30	+35	60	
3	FC Erzgebirge Aue	34	18	6	10	59	40	+19	60	
4	FC Carl Zeiss Jena	34	16	10	8	53	35	+18	58	
5	SV Babelsberg 03	34	16	9	9	57	40	+17	57	
6	FC Sachsen Leipzig	34	16	9	9	46	34	+12	57	
7	Rot-Weiß Erfurt (O)	34	17	6	11	39	41	−2	57	Qualification to relegation play-offs
8	Dynamo Dresden (R)	34	13	13	8	44	34	+10	52	Relegation to Oberliga
9	VfB Leipzig (R)	34	14	7	13	43	36	+7	49	Relegation to Oberliga
10	1. FC Magdeburg (R)	34	13	8	13	64	44	+20	47	Relegation to Oberliga
11	Hertha BSC (A) (R)	34	12	7	15	42	55	−13	43	Relegation to Oberliga
12	EFC Stahl (R)	34	11	7	16	40	61	−21	40	Relegation to Oberliga
13	VFC Plauen (R)	34	9	8	17	39	51	−12	35	Relegation to Oberliga
14	VfL Halle 96 (R)	34	9	8	17	35	65	−30	35	Relegation to Oberliga
15	Tennis Borussia Berlin (A) (R)	34	10	4	20	53	70	−17	34	Relegation to Oberliga
16	FSV Lok Altmark Stendal (R)	34	9	7	18	38	60	−22	34	Relegation to Oberliga
17	BFC Dynamo (R)	34	7	7	20	39	56	−17	28	Relegation to Oberliga
18	FSV Zwickau (R)	34	6	7	21	33	67	−34	25	Relegation to Oberliga

(C) Champions; (O) Play-off winners; (R) Relegated

=== Top scorers ===
#	Player	Club	Goals
1.	(Germany) Hendryk Lau	SV Babelsberg 03	16
2.	(Germany) Steffen Menze	1. FC Union Berlin	14
3.	(Germany) Jörg Kirsten	Erzgebirge Aue	13
4.	(Albania) Harun Isa	Erzgebirge Aue	12
4.	(Germany) Sven Kretschmer	Hertha BSC (A)	12
4.	(Germany) Rocco Milde	FSV Zwickau / Dresdner SC	12
4.	(Germany) Alexander Dürr	VfB Leipzig	11
4.	(Federal Republic of Yugoslavia) Aleksandar Jović	Carl Zeiss Jena	11
4.	(Nigeria) Adolphus Ofodile	1. FC Magdeburg	11
4.	(Greece) Kostas Pantios	Tennis Borussia Berlin (A)	11
4.	(Argentina) Sergio Sánchez	Dresdner SC	11

== West/Südwest ==
1. FC Saarbrücken was promoted to the 2nd Bundesliga.

LR Ahlen won promotion to the 2nd Bundesliga by beating 1. FC Union Berlin and SC Pfullendorf in the play-offs.

Teams ranked from 3 to 11 qualified for the new two-division Regionalliga.

The remaining teams were relegated to the Oberliga.

=== Final table ===
Pos	Team	Pld	W	D	L	GF	GA	GD	Pts	Promotion or relegation
1	1. FC Saarbrücken (C, P)	36	23	8	5	69	22	+47	77	Promotion to 2. Bundesliga
2	LR Ahlen (P)	36	21	8	7	82	32	+50	71	Qualification for promotion play-offs
3	Sportfreunde Siegen	36	20	7	9	61	42	+19	67	
4	SG Wattenscheid 09	36	18	9	9	72	42	+30	63	
5	Eintracht Trier	36	17	9	10	54	47	+7	60	
6	Fortuna Düsseldorf	36	13	14	9	53	35	+18	53	
7	Rot-Weiss Essen	36	14	10	12	55	46	+9	52	
8	Preußen Münster	36	14	8	14	50	54	−4	50	
9	SC Verl	36	12	13	11	49	44	+5	49	
10	Borussia Dortmund (A)	36	12	13	11	42	40	+2	49	
11	KFC Uerdingen 05	36	13	9	14	52	52	0	48	
12	SV Elversberg (O)	36	13	9	14	49	49	0	48	Qualification for relegation play-offs
13	SC Paderborn 07 (R)	36	13	9	14	47	47	0	48	Relegation to Oberliga
14	1. FC Kaiserslautern (A) (R)	36	13	9	14	49	55	−6	48	Relegation to Oberliga
15	VfL Bochum (A) (R)	36	11	7	18	57	69	−12	40	Relegation to Oberliga
16	Bayer 04 Leverkusen (A) (R)	36	8	14	14	45	52	−7	38	Relegation to Oberliga
17	FK Pirmasens (R)	36	9	6	21	38	75	−37	33	Relegation to Oberliga
18	SC 07 Idar-Oberstein (R)	36	8	7	21	25	78	−53	31	Relegation to Oberliga
19	FSV Salmrohr (R)	36	5	1	30	19	87	−68	16	Relegation to Oberliga
20	FC Gütersloh (Note: FC Gütersloh went into receivership during the season. All matches were annulled.) (R)	0	0	0	0	0	0	0	0	Relegation to Oberliga

(C) Champions; (O) Play-off winners; (P) Promoted; (R) Relegated

=== Top scorers ===
#	Player	Club	Goals
1.	(Germany) Marius Ebbers	SG Wattenscheid 09	23
2.	(Brazil) Daniel Teixeira	KFC Uerdingen	22
3.	(Germany) Mario Krohm	LR Ahlen	21
4.	(Nigeria) Sambo Choji	1. FC Saarbrücken	20
5.	(Nigeria) Amaechi Ottiji	FC Gütersloh / Sportfreunde Siegen	19
6.	(Turkey) Ersin Demir	Bayer Leverkusen (A)	18
7.	(Poland) Marek Czakon	SV Elversberg	17
8.	(Germany) Sascha Wolf	Rot-Weiß Essen	16
9.	(Germany) Tobias Weis	1. FC Kaiserslautern (A)	14
10.	(Germany) Jan Majewski	VfL Bochum (A)	13
10.	(Nigeria) Ganiyu Shittu	Fortuna Düsseldorf	13
10.	(Italy) Raffael Tonello	Sportfreunde Siegen	13

== Süd ==
SSV Reutlingen 05 was promoted to the 2. Bundesliga. SC Pfullendorf took part in the play-offs against 1. FC Union Berlin and LR Ahlen, but could not win promotion.

Teams ranked 3 to 13 qualified for the new two-division Regionalliga.

Teams ranked below 13 were relegated to the Oberliga.

FC Augsburg and Karlsruher SC Amateure were forcibly relegated.

Pos	Team	Pld	W	D	L	GF	GA	GD	Pts	Promotion or relegation
1	SSV Reutlingen 05 (C, P)	34	28	3	3	102	25	+77	87	Promotion to 2. Bundesliga
2	SC Pfullendorf	34	18	7	9	57	36	+21	61	Qualification for promotion play-offs
3	VfR Mannheim	34	15	12	7	61	55	+6	57	
4	Wacker Burghausen	34	15	10	9	57	42	+15	55	
5	FC Bayern Munich (A)	34	15	6	13	64	58	+6	51	
6	VfB Stuttgart (A)	34	12	14	8	51	34	+17	50	
7	TSV 1860 München (A)	34	12	12	10	48	38	+10	48	
8	FC Augsburg (R)	34	12	10	12	43	43	0	46	Relegation to Oberliga
9	SV Darmstadt 98	34	11	13	10	49	51	−2	46	
10	VfR Aalen	34	12	10	12	51	54	−3	46	
11	1. FC Schweinfurt 05	34	14	3	17	47	54	−7	45	
12	Karlsruher SC (A) (R)	34	11	11	12	56	51	+5	44	Relegation to Oberliga
13	SV Wehen	34	11	10	13	46	52	−6	43	
14	FSV Frankfurt (R)	34	10	11	13	48	57	−9	41	Qualification for relegation play-offs
15	TSF Ditzingen (R)	34	8	12	14	46	55	−9	36	Relegation to Oberliga
16	SG Quelle Fürth (R)	34	8	11	15	40	70	−30	35	Relegation to Oberliga
17	Borussia Fulda (R)	34	6	13	15	40	57	−17	31	Relegation to Oberliga
18	SV Lohhof (R)	34	2	4	28	29	103	−74	10	Relegation to Oberliga

(C) Champions; (P) Promoted; (R) Relegated

=== Top scorers ===
#	Player	Club	Goals
1.	(Cameroon) Olivier Djappa	SSV Reutlingen	36
2.	(Croatia) Neno Rogošić	VfR Aalen	18
3.	(Croatia) Marko Barlecaj	SC Pfullendorf	17
3.	(Croatia) Ivica Magdić	SC Pfullendorf	17
5.	(Germany) Zdenko Juric	VfR Mannheim	16
5.	(Germany) Sascha Maier	Wacker Burghausen	16
7.	(Germany) Ralf Becker	SSV Reutlingen	15
8.	(Germany) Patrick Würll	Bayern Munich (A)	14
9.	(Germany) Markus Lützler	Wacker Burghausen	13
9.	(Germany) Andreas Rüppel	FSV Frankfurt	13
9.	(Italy) Antonio Di Salvo	Bayern Munich (A)	13

== Promotion playoffs ==
=== Round 1 ===
The champions of the Regionalliga Nord (VfL Osnabrück) and Regionalliga Nordost (1. FC Union Berlin) faced each other in a two-legged playoff. Osnabrück, as winners, were promoted to the 2. Bundesliga, while Union were given another chance at promotion in round 2.

28 May 2000	1. FC Union Berlin	1 – 1	VfL Osnabrück	Berlin
	Preiksaitis 68'		Schütte 42'	Stadium: Stadion Alte Försterei; Attendance: 15,575; Referee: Alfons Berg

1 June 2000	VfL Osnabrück	1 – 1 (aet) (8–7 p)	1. FC Union Berlin	Osnabrück
	Claaßen 43'		Härtel 11'	Stadium: Stadion an der Bremer Brücke; Attendance: 20,336; Referee: Jürgen Aust
	Penalties
	Weiland (penalty scored); Claaßen (penalty scored); Schiersand (penalty scored); Vural (penalty scored); Janiak (penalty missed); Enochs (penalty scored); Schütte (penalty scored); Spork (penalty scored); Hartenberger (penalty missed); Brunn (penalty scored)		Zechner (penalty missed); Balcarek (penalty scored); Preiksaitis (penalty scored); Nikol (penalty scored); Koilov (penalty scored); Persich (penalty scored); Okeke (penalty scored); Härtel (penalty scored); Menze (penalty missed); Wehner (penalty missed)

=== Round 2 ===
1. FC Union Berlin faced the runners up of the Regionalliga West/Südwest (LR Ahlen) and Regionalliga Süd (SC Pfullendorf) in a round-robin tournament. Ahlen won this mini-league, and took the final promotion place.

==== Matches ====
3 June 2000	SC Pfullendorf	1 – 1	LR Ahlen	Pfullendorf
	Magdić 11'		Krohm 78'	Stadium: Waldstadion; Attendance: 5,250; Referee: Lutz Wagner

6 June 2000	1. FC Union Berlin	3 – 1	SC Pfullendorf	Berlin
	Persich 45'; Okeke 73'; Boszik 90'		Fall 70'	Stadium: Stadion Alte Försterei; Attendance: 7,500; Referee: Uwe Kemmling

9 June 2000	LR Ahlen	2 – 1	1. FC Union Berlin	Ahlen
	Krohm 55'; Canale 79'		Koilov 54'	Stadium: Wersestadion; Attendance: 10,100; Referee: Hartmut Strampe

==== Standings ====
Pos	Team	Pld	W	D	L	GF	GA	GD	Pts
1	LR Ahlen	2	1	1	0	3	2	+1	4
2	1. FC Union Berlin	2	1	0	1	4	3	+1	3
3	SC Pfullendorf	2	0	1	1	2	4	−2	1

== Relegation playoffs ==
=== Nord ===
Kickers Emden, champions of the Oberliga Niedersachsen/Bremen, beat TuS Felde, Oberliga Schleswig-Holstein champions in a playoff to face Lüneburger SK, who had finished 6th in the Regionalliga Nord. Lüneburg won 3–1 on aggregate to stay in the Regionalliga.

Lüneburger SK	1 – 1	Kickers Emden	Lüneburg
			Stadium: Wilschenbruch

Kickers Emden	2 – 0	Lüneburger SK	Emden
			Stadium: Ostfriesland-Stadion

=== Nordost ===
FC Schönberg 95, champions of the NOFV-Oberliga Nord, beat FSV Hoyerswerda, NOFV-Oberliga Süd champions in a playoff to face Rot-Weiß Erfurt, who had finished 7th in the Regionalliga Nordost. Erfurt won 4–2 on aggregate to stay in the Regionalliga.

FC Schönberg 95	1 – 0	Rot-Weiß Erfurt	Schönberg
			Stadium: Jahnstation

Rot-Weiß Erfurt	4 – 1	FC Schönberg 95	Erfurt
			Stadium: Steigerwaldstadion

=== West/Südwest ===
SV Elversberg, who had finished twelfth in the Regionalliga West/Südwest, entered a mini-league with VfB Hüls (Oberliga Westfalen champions), Wuppertaler SV (Oberliga Nordrhein champions) and Borussia Neunkirchen (Oberliga Südwest champions) for a place in the Regionalliga. Elversberg won the league with a 100% record.

Pos	Team	Pld	W	D	L	GF	GA	GD	Pts
1	SV Elversberg	3	3	0	0	8	3	+5	9
2	VfB Hüls	3	2	0	1	5	2	+3	6
3	Wuppertaler SV	3	1	0	2	7	4	+3	3
3	Borussia Neunkirchen	3	0	0	3	0	11	−11	0

=== Süd ===
No team from the Oberliga Hessen entered qualification, so the champions of the Oberliga Baden-Württemberg (SV Sandhausen) and Bayernliga (Jahn Regensburg) played off in the first round. Regensburg won 5–6 on aggregate, and went on to play FSV Frankfurt, winning 6–3 on aggregate to earn promotion to the Regionalliga Süd.

FSV Frankfurt	2 – 3	Jahn Regensburg	Frankfurt
			Stadium: Stadion am Bornheimer Hang

Jahn Regensburg	3 – 1	FSV Frankfurt	Regensburg
			Stadium: Jahnstadion
