= List of Fortuna Düsseldorf seasons =

The following is a list of seasons played by Fortuna Düsseldorf from the 1947–48 season up to the most recent season. It is divided into two parts coinciding with the regional league structure of post-war Germany, and the formation of a nationwide league, the Bundesliga.

== Key ==
Champions	Runners-up	Promoted	Relegated

- Avg. Att. = Average attendance at home
- Europe = European competition entered
- Result = Result in that competition
- — = Did not Qualify
- R1 = Round 1
- R2 = Round 2
- R3 = Round 3
- R4 = Round 4
- Group = Group stage
- QF = Quarter-finals
- SF = Semi-finals
- RU = Runners-Up
- W = Winners

== 1947 to 1963: Oberliga West ==
Season	League	Tier	Position	GFC	Cup
1947–48	Oberliga West	1	7th	—	
1948–49	Oberliga West	1	11th	—	
1949–50	2. Liga West	2	2nd	—	
1950–51	Oberliga West	1	5th	—	
1951–52	Oberliga West	1	12th	—	
1952–53	Oberliga West	1	9th	—	—
1953–54	Oberliga West	1	10th	—	—
1954–55	Oberliga West	1	7th	—	—
1955–56	Oberliga West	1	6th	—	SF
1956–57	Oberliga West	1	6th	—	RU
1957–58	Oberliga West	1	8th	—	RU
1958–59	Oberliga West	1	3rd	—	—
1959–60	Oberliga West	1	15th	—	—
1960–61	2. Liga West	2	2nd	—	—
1961–62	Oberliga West	1	9th	—	RU
1962–63	Oberliga West	1	13th	—	—

== 1963 to Present: Formation of the Bundesliga ==
Since 1963 Fortuna Düsseldorf have played in the top four tiers of the German football league system. Fortuna Düsseldorf's most successful period during these years was from the 1971–72 season until the 1986–87 season. They played 16 consecutive seasons in the Bundesliga, twice won the DFB-Pokal and reached the final of the Cup Winners' Cup in 1980.

Season	League	Tier	Position	Cup	Europe	Result	Av. Att.	Top Scorer(s)	Goals
1963–64	Regionalliga West	2	3rd	—	—			(Germany) Peter Meyer	30
1964–65	Regionalliga West	2	3rd	—	—			(Germany) Peter Meyer	25
1965–66	Regionalliga West	2	1st	R1	—			(Germany) Waldemar Gerhardt (Germany) Peter Meyer (Germany) Reinhold Straus	16
1966–67	Bundesliga	1	17th	QF	—		29,176	(Germany) Waldemar Gerhardt	12
1967–68	Regionalliga West	2	6th	—	Intertoto Cup	W		(Germany) Waldemar Gerhardt (Germany) Jürgen Papies	14
1968–69	Regionalliga West	2	4th	—	—			(Germany) Jürgen Papies	19
1969–70	Regionalliga West	2	4th	—	—			(Germany) Reiner Geye	15
1970–71	Regionalliga West	2	2nd	SF	—			(Germany) Reiner Geye	25
1971–72	Bundesliga	1	13th	R2	—		15,412	(Germany) Reiner Geye	8
1972–73	Bundesliga	1	3rd	R1	—		26,118	(Germany) Reiner Geye	16
1973–74	Bundesliga	1	3rd	R1	UEFA Cup	R3	23,912	(Germany) Reiner Geye	16
1974–75	Bundesliga	1	6th	QF	UEFA Cup	R3	22,235	(Germany) Reiner Geye	15
1975–76	Bundesliga	1	12th	QF	—		18,324	(Germany) Dieter Herzog	9
1976–77	Bundesliga	1	12th	R2	—		20,471	(Germany) Wolfgang Seel (Germany) Detlev Szymanek	9
1977–78	Bundesliga	1	5th	RU	—		22,576	(Germany) Wolfgang Seel	8
1978–79	Bundesliga	1	7th	W	Cup Winners' Cup	RU	18,935	(Germany) Klaus Allofs	22
1979–80	Bundesliga	1	11th	W	Cup Winners' Cup	R1	20,541	(Germany) Klaus Allofs	16
1980–81	Bundesliga	1	13th	QF	Cup Winners' Cup	R3	18,398	(Germany) Klaus Allofs	19
1981–82	Bundesliga	1	15th	R3	—		15,559	(Germany) Thomas Allofs	13
1982–83	Bundesliga	1	9th	R2	—		13,141	(Iceland) Atli Eðvaldsson	21
1983–84	Bundesliga	1	14th	R1	—		20,735	(Germany) Günter Thiele	12
1984–85	Bundesliga	1	15th	R2	Intertoto Cup	W	12,518	(Germany) Günter Thiele	17
1985–86	Bundesliga	1	14th	R2	—		10,312	(Sweden) Hans Holmqvist	11
1986–87	Bundesliga	1	17th	SF	Intertoto Cup	W	12,265	(Denmark) Henrik Ravn Jensen	7
1987–88	2. Bundesliga	2	5th	R3	—		6,868	(Germany) Sven Demandt	14
1988–89	2. Bundesliga	2	1st	R1	—		8,726	(Germany) Sven Demandt	35
1989–90	Bundesliga	1	9th	QF	—		19,941	(Germany) Uwe Fuchs	7
1990–91	Bundesliga	1	12th	R2	—		16,588	(Germany) Thomas Allofs	15
1991–92	Bundesliga	1	20th	R2	—		14,000	(Germany) Christian Schreier	8
1992–93	2. Bundesliga	2	21st	R4	—		5,726	(Poland) Ryszard Cyroń	9
1993–94	Oberliga Nordrhein	3	1st	R2	—			(Poland) Ryszard Cyroń	22
1994–95	2. Bundesliga	2	3rd	—	—		9,659	(Bosnia and Herzegovina) Vlatko Glavaš	10
1995–96	Bundesliga	1	13th	R3	—		25,079	(Poland) Ryszard Cyroń	9
1996–97	Bundesliga	1	16th	R2	—		21,265	(Ukraine) Sergei Yuran	5
1997–98	2. Bundesliga	2	7th	R1	—		12,124	(Albania) Igli Tare	13
1998–99	2. Bundesliga	2	18th	R3	—		8,888	(Albania) Igli Tare	11
1999–2000	Regionalliga West–Südwest	3	6th	R2	—		4,412	(Nigeria) Ganiyu Shittu	13
2000–01	Regionalliga Nord	3	16th	—	—		5,125	(Belarus) Oleg Putilo	11
2001–02	Regionalliga Nord	3	17th	—	—		5,719	(Germany) Frank Mayer	7
2002–03	Oberliga Nordrhein	4	8th	—	—		3,750	(Germany) Frank Mayer	18
2003–04	Oberliga Nordrhein	4	2nd	—	—		5,500	(Germany) Frank Mayer	9
2004–05	Regionalliga Nord	3	8th	R1	—		8,611	(Germany) Frank Mayer	9
2005–06	Regionalliga Nord	3	5th	—	—		7,387	(Germany) Marcus Feinbier	15
2006–07	Regionalliga Nord	3	10th	—	—		10,603	(Germany) Marcus Feinbier	9
2007–08	Regionalliga Nord	3	3rd	—	—		12,682	(Belgium) Axel Lawaree	15
2008–09	3rd Liga	3	2nd	—	—		14,875	(Germany) Marco Christ	11
2009–10	2. Bundesliga	2	4th	R1	—		28,007	(Austria) Martin Harnik	13
2010–11	2. Bundesliga	2	7th	R1	—		21,051	(Germany) Jens Langeneke	8
2011–12	2. Bundesliga	2	3rd	R3	—		31,900	(Germany) Sascha Rösler	13
2012–13	Bundesliga	1	17th	R3	—		45,991	(Germany) Dani Schahin	8
2013–14	2. Bundesliga	2	6th	R1	—		33,982	(Curaçao) Charlison Benschop	12
2014–15	2. Bundesliga	2	10th	R1	—		29,944	(Curaçao) Charlison Benschop	13
2015–16	2. Bundesliga	2	14th	R2	—		25,897	(Germany) Kerem Demirbay	10
2016–17	2. Bundesliga	2	11th	R2	—		25,978	(Germany) Rouwen Hennings	9
2017–18	2. Bundesliga	2	1st	R2	—		28,913	(Germany) Rouwen Hennings	13
2018–19	Bundesliga	1	10th	R3	—		44,339	(Belgium) Dodi Lukebakio (Belgium) Benito Raman	10
2019–20	Bundesliga	1	17th	QF	—		30,581	(Germany) Rouwen Hennings	15
2020–21	2. Bundesliga	2	5th	R2	—		441	(Germany) Rouwen Hennings	9
2021–22	2. Bundesliga	2	10th	R2	—		17,526	(Germany) Rouwen Hennings	13
2022–23	2. Bundesliga	2	4th	R3	—		29,420	(Poland) Dawid Kownacki	14
2023–24	2. Bundesliga	2	3rd	SF	—		39,672	(Greece) Christos Tzolis	22
2024–25	2. Bundesliga	2	6th	R1	—		41,431	(Poland) Dawid Kownacki	13
2025–26	2. Bundesliga	2	17th	R2	—		42,355	(Switzerland) Cedric Itten	15
