= Judt =

Judt is a surname. Notable people with the surname include:

- Juri Judt (born 1986), German footballer
- Thorsten Judt (born 1971), German footballer
- Tony Judt (1948–2010), English-American historian, essayist, and professor
