= Michael Rösele =

German footballer

Personal information
- Date of birth: 7 October 1974 (age 52)
- Place of birth: Augsburg, West Germany
- Height: 1.83 m (6 ft 0 in)
- Position: Midfielder

Youth career
- Bayern Munich
- TSV Friedberg

Senior career*
Years	Team	Apps	(Gls)
1993–1994	FC Augsburg		
1994–2000	1. FC Köln	66	(6)
2001–2002	LR Ahlen	28	(0)
2002–2004	Fortuna Düsseldorf		
- * Club domestic league appearances and goals

Michael Rösele (born 7 October 1974 in Augsburg) is a German former professional footballer who played as a midfielder. He played for seven seasons with 1. FC Köln, including five in the Bundesliga.
