= Matthias Keller (footballer) =

German footballer (born 1974)

Personal information
- Date of birth: 20 November 1974 (age 51)
- Place of birth: Schweinfurt, West Germany
- Height: 1.80 m (5 ft 11 in)
- Position: Midfielder

Youth career
- TSV Röthlein
- –1996: 1. FC Schweinfurt 05

Senior career*
Years	Team	Apps	(Gls)
1993–1996	1. FC Schweinfurt 05	91	(10)
1996–1997	1. FC Kaiserslautern	1	(0)
1997–2000	SV Meppen	57	(5)
2000–2005	Eintracht Trier	160	(22)
2005–2008	1899 Hoffenheim	52	(3)
2007–2009	1899 Hoffenheim II	44	(6)
2009–2011	FC Zuzenhausen	1	(0)
2013–2015	TSV Röthlein		
Total		406	(46)
- * Club domestic league appearances and goals

Matthias Keller (born 20 November 1974) is a German former professional footballer who played as a midfielder.

Keller was born in Schweinfurt. He was a member of the 1899 Hoffenheim team that won promotion to the 2. Bundesliga as well as promotion to the Bundesliga. Since the end of the 2007–08 season, Keller played for Hoffenheim's reserve team until 2009. He has a wife, Sonja, and one daughter.
