= Jiří Kaufman =

Czech soccer player (born 1979)

Personal information
- Full name: Jiří Kaufman
- Date of birth: 28 November 1979 (age 46)
- Place of birth: Pardubice, Czechoslovakia
- Height: 1.79 m (5 ft 10 in)
- Position: Striker

Youth career
- 1987–1989: Tesla Pardubice
- 1989–1993: VCHZ Pardubice
- 1993–1994: Hradec Králové
- 1994–1998: Bohdaneč
- 1998: VP Frýdek-Místek

Senior career*
Years	Team	Apps	(Gls)
1999–2001	FK Drnovice		
2001–2003	Hannover 96	51	(17)
2003–2004	Energie Cottbus (loan)	23	(3)
2004–2005	Hannover 96	13	(3)
2005–2007	Karlsruher SC	28	(6)
2007–2008	Erzgebirge Aue	21	(7)
2008–2009	Hradec Králové	24	(6)
2009–2012	Bohemians 1905	40	(7)

International career
2000–2002	Czech Republic U21	10	(4)
- * Club domestic league appearances and goals

Jiří Kaufman (born 28 November 1979) is a retired Czech football striker who formerly played for Erzgebirge Aue and Czech second division side Hradec Králové. He has played for the Czech Republic national under-21 football team.
