= Christian Claaßen =

German footballer

Personal information
- Date of birth: 22 May 1969 (age 57)
- Place of birth: Barßel, West Germany
- Height: 1.85 m (6 ft 1 in)
- Position: Forward

Youth career
- –1990: VfL Oldenburg

Senior career*
Years	Team	Apps	(Gls)
1990–1993	VfB Oldenburg	75	(7)
1993–1995	SV Wilhelmshaven		
1995	Hamburger SV	5	(0)
1995–1998	SV Meppen	80	(20)
1998–2004	VfL Osnabrück	182	(62)
2004–2006	SV Meppen	52	(20)
2006–2008	VfL Oldenburg		
- * Club domestic league appearances and goals

Christian Claaßen (born 22 May 1969) is a German former professional footballer who played as a forward.
