= Chibuike Okeke =

Nigerian footballer

Personal information
- Date of birth: 9 September 1979 (age 47)
- Place of birth: Nigeria
- Height: 1.80 m (5 ft 11 in)
- Position: Midfielder

Youth career
- Nwaschuku
- –1996: Enyimba International

Senior career*
Years	Team	Apps	(Gls)
1997–1999	Iwuanyanwu Nationale		
1999	West Riffa		
2000–2004	Union Berlin	95	(6)
2004–2005	Chemnitzer FC	27	(4)
2006–2008	Berliner AK		

International career
1999–2001	Nigeria	1	(0)
- * Club domestic league appearances and goals

Chibuike Okeke (born 9 September 1979) is a Nigerian former professional footballer who played as a midfielder.
