= Tomasz Szewczuk =

Polish footballer

Personal information
- Full name: Tomasz Szewczuk
- Date of birth: 3 December 1978 (age 47)
- Place of birth: Lubin, Poland
- Height: 1.85 m (6 ft 1 in)
- Position: Striker

Youth career
- Amica Wronki

Senior career*
Years	Team	Apps	(Gls)
1998–2000	Zagłębie Lubin	4	(0)
2000–2001	Miedź Legnica		
2001–2004	Rot-Weiss Erfurt	23	(1)
2004	Miedź Legnica		
2004–2005	Odra Wodzisław Śląski	23	(4)
2005	Korona Kielce	11	(1)
2006	Lech Poznań	11	(0)
2006–2012	Śląsk Wrocław	111	(18)
2012	→ Miedź Legnica (loan)	11	(2)
2016	Grom Gromadzyń-Wielowieś		
- * Club domestic league appearances and goals

Tomasz Szewczuk (born 3 December 1978) is a Polish former professional footballer who played as a striker.

== Honours ==
Śląsk Wrocław

- Ekstraklasa Cup: 2008–09

Miedź Legnica

- II liga West: 2011–12
