= Ulf Mehlhorn =

German footballer

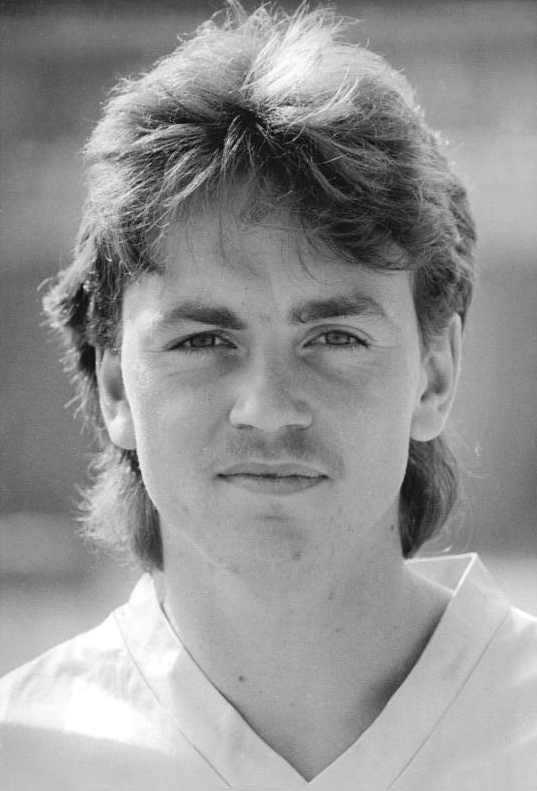
- Mehlhorn in 1990

Personal information
- Date of birth: 21 June 1968 (age 58)
- Place of birth: Stollberg, East Germany
- Height: 1.86 m (6 ft 1 in)
- Position: Defender

Youth career
- –1981: BSG Esda Thalheim
- 1981–1987: FC Karl-Marx-Stadt

Senior career*
Years	Team	Apps	(Gls)
1987–1995	Chemnitzer FC	223	(20)
1995–1997	Fortuna Düsseldorf	57	(2)
1997–1998	VfB Leipzig	33	(1)
1998–2005	Chemnitzer FC	206	(15)
Total		519	(38)

International career
	East Germany B	1	(0)
- * Club domestic league appearances and goals

Ulf Mehlhorn (born 21 June 1968) is a German former professional footballer who played as a defender.
