= Stefan Minkwitz =

German footballer and manager (born 1969)

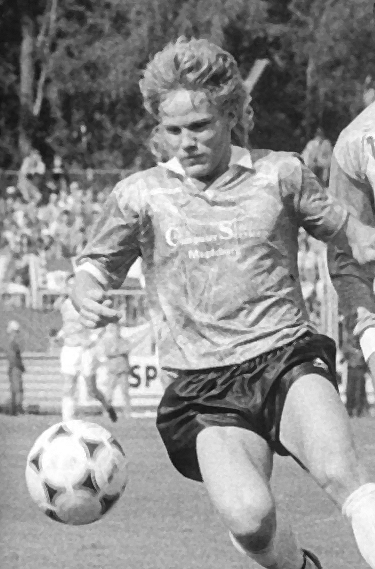
- Minkwitz in 1990

Personal information
- Date of birth: 1 June 1969 (age 57)
- Place of birth: Magdeburg, East Germany
- Height: 1.72 m (5 ft 8 in)
- Position: Midfielder

Youth career
- BSG Traktor Niederndodeleben
- –1976: 1. FC Magdeburg
- 1976–1981: Börde Rottmersleben
- 1981–1987: 1. FC Magdeburg

Senior career*
Years	Team	Apps	(Gls)
1987–1992	1. FC Magdeburg	110	(12)
1992–1994	MSV Duisburg	37	(2)
1994	Stuttgarter Kickers	19	(0)
1994–1996	Fortuna Düsseldorf	30	(1)
1996–2004	Stuttgarter Kickers	186	(4)
Total		382	(19)

International career
1990	East Germany	2	(0)

Managerial career
- 2003–2007: Stuttgarter Kickers (assistant)
- 2003–2007: Stuttgarter Kickers U19
- 2007–2008: Stuttgarter Kickers
- 2010: SSV Reutlingen
- 2010–2011: SV Hoffeld
- 2014–2015: SV Elversberg (assistant)
- 2015: SV Elversberg (caretaker)
- 2018: SV Elversberg (assistant)
- * Club domestic league appearances and goals

Stefan Minkwitz (born 1 June 1969 in Magdeburg) is a German football coach and former player.

As a midfielder, he appeared in 82 German top-flight matches - 72 in the DDR-Oberliga and ten in the German unified Bundesliga. Minkwitz won two caps for the East Germany national team in 1990.
