= Olivier Djappa =

Cameroonian footballer (born 1969)

Personal information
- Date of birth: 22 November 1969 (age 56)
- Place of birth: Douala, Cameroon
- Height: 1.81 m (5 ft 11 in)
- Position: Striker

Senior career*
Years	Team	Apps	(Gls)
–1993	Racing FC Bafoussam		
1993–1994	Rot-Weiss Essen	18	(4)
1994–1999	Borussia Fulda	86	(43)
1999–2002	SSV Reutlingen	96	(60)
2002–2003	SpVgg Unterhaching	15	(2)
2003–2004	Germania Ratingen	21	(9)
2004–2005	SSV Hagen		
2005–2008	Borussia Fulda		

International career
	Cameroon	15	(3)
- * Club domestic league appearances and goals

Olivier Djappa (born 22 November 1969) is a Cameroonian former professional footballer who played as a striker.

He played 80 matches and scored 28 goals in the 2. Bundesliga.

== Honours ==
Individual

- Regionalliga Süd top scorer: 1999–2000
- 2. Bundesliga top scorer: 2000–01 (18 goals)
