= Jan Hoffmann (German footballer) =

German footballer

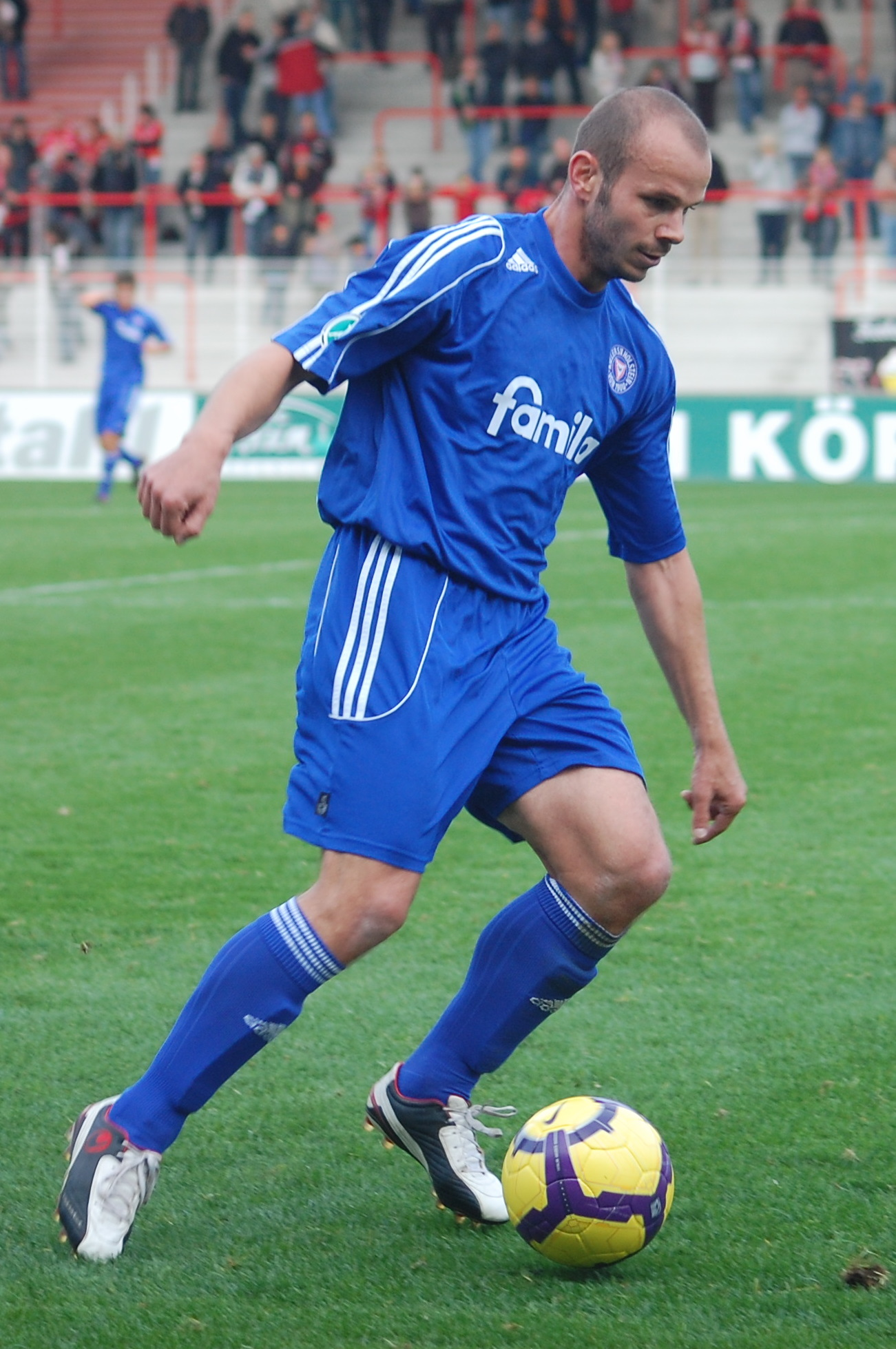
- Hoffmann in 2009

Personal information
- Full name: Jan Hoffmann
- Date of birth: 1 September 1979 (age 47)
- Place of birth: Gomadingen, West Germany
- Height: 1.74 m (5 ft 9 in)
- Position: Midfielder

Youth career
- 1985–1990: TSV Holzelfingen
- 1990–1995: VfB Stuttgart
- 1995–1998: SSV Reutlingen 05

Senior career*
Years	Team	Apps	(Gls)
1998–2003	SSV Reutlingen 05	143	(24)
2003–2004	Greuther Fürth	19	(0)
2004–2006	Jahn Regensburg	57	(11)
2006–2008	VfB Lübeck	56	(10)
2008–2010	Holstein Kiel	22	(3)
2009	Holstein Kiel II	6	(5)
Total		273	(53)

Managerial career
- 2010–2014: TSV Gomaringen
- * Club domestic league appearances and goals

Jan Hoffmann (born 1 September 1979) is a German retired footballer who played as a midfielder.
