= Jörn Schwinkendorf =

German footballer

Personal information
- Date of birth: 27 January 1971 (age 55)
- Place of birth: Hamburg, West Germany
- Height: 6 ft 5 in (1.96 m)
- Position: Defender

Senior career*
Years	Team	Apps	(Gls)
1992–1993	FC St. Pauli	41	(2)
1993–1994	Wuppertaler SV	31	(3)
1994–1995	1. FC Saarbrücken	24	(0)
1995–1996	Fortuna Düsseldorf	18	(0)
1996–1997	VfB Lübeck	31	(0)
1997–1999	SC Freiburg	26	(3)
1999	Waldhof Mannheim	9	(0)
1999–2000	Cardiff City	5	(0)
2000–2001	VfL Osnabrück	22	(0)
Total		207	(8)
- * Club domestic league appearances and goals

Jörn Schwinkendorf (born 27 January 1971) is a German former professional footballer who played as a defender.

Playing his football at various sides in the lower division league in Germany, Schwinkendorf came to the attention of Cardiff City who paid £110,000 to SV Waldhof Mannheim for his services. However, despite his height he struggled to adapt to the physical nature of lower-tier English football and left the club later in the season after only playing a handful of games.
