= Ben Manga =

Equatoguinean football player, scout and manager

Personal information
- Full name: Bienvenido Manga Ubenga
- Date of birth: 11 February 1974 (age 52)
- Place of birth: Bata, Equatorial Guinea
- Height: 1.70 m (5 ft 7 in)
- Position: Midfielder

Youth career
- 1978–1993: VfR Neuss

Senior career*
Years	Team	Apps	(Gls)
1993–1996	Fortuna Düsseldorf	3	(0)
1996	Wuppertaler SV		
1996–1997	KFC Uerdingen 05		
1997–2000	Alemannia Aachen	1	(0)
2000–2001	Karlsruher SC	21	(0)
2001–2002	Wormatia Worms	11	(1)
2002–2003	GFC Düren 09	22	(1)
2003–2005	Alemannia Aachen	21	
2005	Alemannia Aachen II	1	(0)

International career
1990s	Equatorial Guinea		

Managerial career
- 2003–2005: Alemannia Aachen (D youth)
- 2005–2008: Alemannia Aachen (C youth)
- 2008–2010: Alemannia Aachen (U17)
- 2003–2011: Alemannia Aachen (scout)
- 2011–2012: 1899 Hoffenheim (scout)
- 2012–2016: VfB Stuttgart (scout)
- 2016–2022: Eintracht Frankfurt (scout and squad planner)
- 2022–2023: Watford (technical director)
- 2024–2025: Schalke 04 (technical director)
- * Club domestic league appearances and goals

Bienvenido "Ben" Manga Ubenga (born 11 February 1974) is an Equatoguinean former footballer who played as a midfielder. His last position was as technical director of 2. Bundesliga club Schalke 04.

== Career ==
Ben Manga was born in Bata. He managed three scoreless Bundesliga appearances for Fortuna Düsseldorf in the 1995–96 season.

In July 2016, Manga was appointed Chief Scout of Eintracht Frankfurt, a role he held until 2021 when he also took on the role of Director of Football. On 30 November 2022, he departed the club by mutual consent.

On 22 December 2022, Manga was appointed technical director of EFL Championship club Watford. In the following winter transfer window Ismaël Koné and João Ferreira were signed, Henrique Araújo loaned. Mangas only summer transfer window at Watford saw the hiring of Valerien Ismael as coach and players like Mileta Rajović, Tom Ince, while some top performers left. He departed the club in October 2023.

On 10 May 2024, Schalke 04 announced that Manga became their new director of squad planning, scouting and youth academy. The club announced that the contract was ended on mutual terms in September 2025.

== Personal life ==
He lives in the English city of London and also holds German citizenship. Manga also worked as an auto mechanic. He has a cousin, Juan Oburu, who plays for TV Jahn Hiesfeld.
