= 2000–01 2. Bundesliga =

27th season of the second-tier football league in Germany

2. Bundesliga
- Season: 2000–01
- Champions: 1. FC Nürnberg
- Promoted: 1. FC Nürnberg; Borussia Mönchengladbach; FC St. Pauli
- Relegated: VfL Osnabrück; SSV Ulm 1846; Stuttgarter Kickers; Chemnitzer FC
- Top goalscorer: Artur Wichniarek Olivier Djappa (18)

The 2000–01 2. Bundesliga was the 27th season of the 2. Bundesliga, the second tier of the German football league system. 1. FC Nürnberg, Borussia Mönchengladbach and FC St. Pauli were promoted to the Bundesliga while VfL Osnabrück, SSV Ulm 1846, Stuttgarter Kickers and Chemnitzer FC were relegated to the Regionalliga.

== League table ==
For the 2000–01 season LR Ahlen, SSV Reutlingen, 1. FC Saarbrücken and VfL Osnabrück were newly promoted to the 2. Bundesliga from the Regionalliga while SSV Ulm 1846, Arminia Bielefeld and MSV Duisburg had been relegated to the league from the Bundesliga.

Locations of the participating teams of the 2000–2001 season

Pos	Team	Pld	W	D	L	GF	GA	GD	Pts	Promotion or relegation
1	1. FC Nürnberg (C, P)	34	20	5	9	58	35	+23	65	Promotion to Bundesliga
2	Borussia Mönchengladbach (P)	34	17	11	6	62	31	+31	62	Promotion to Bundesliga
3	FC St. Pauli (P)	34	17	9	8	70	52	+18	60	Promotion to Bundesliga
4	Waldhof Mannheim	34	17	8	9	57	42	+15	59	
5	SpVgg Greuther Fürth	34	15	9	10	55	38	+17	54	
6	LR Ahlen	34	15	9	10	61	53	+8	54	
7	SSV Reutlingen	34	15	8	11	64	52	+12	53	
8	1. FC Saarbrücken	34	14	8	12	48	59	−11	50	
9	Hannover 96	34	12	10	12	52	45	+7	46	
10	Alemannia Aachen	34	13	7	14	42	60	−18	46	
11	MSV Duisburg	34	12	9	13	46	40	+6	45	
12	Rot-Weiß Oberhausen	34	13	6	15	45	50	−5	45	
13	Arminia Bielefeld	34	10	11	13	53	46	+7	41	
14	Mainz 05	34	10	10	14	37	45	−8	40	
15	VfL Osnabrück (R)	34	9	10	15	40	52	−12	37	Relegation to Regionalliga (Note: Chemnitzer FC and VfL Osnabrück were relegated to Regionalliga Nord. Stuttgarter Kickers and SSV Ulm were relegated to Regionalliga Süd)
16	SSV Ulm 1846 (R)	34	9	7	18	42	58	−16	34	Relegation to Regionalliga
17	Stuttgarter Kickers (R)	34	8	10	16	42	58	−16	34	Relegation to Regionalliga
18	Chemnitzer FC (R)	34	3	7	24	24	78	−54	16	Relegation to Regionalliga

Source: Bundesliga.de
Rules for classification: 1) points; 2) goal difference; 3) number of goals scored.
(C) Champions; (P) Promoted; (R) Relegated

== Results ==
Home \ Away	AAC	LRA	DSC	CFC	DUI	SGF	H96	M05	WMA	BMG	FCN	RWO	OSN	R05	FCS	STP	SKI	ULM
Alemannia Aachen	—	4–3	1–0	1–2	1–0	0–0	0–4	1–0	0–1	1–1	0–1	3–1	0–0	4–1	1–0	0–1	3–0	1–0
LR Ahlen	1–2	—	1–1	5–2	3–2	2–0	2–1	1–0	1–2	2–1	0–1	4–1	1–0	3–1	2–0	3–6	1–1	1–0
Arminia Bielefeld	1–1	1–1	—	5–1	1–1	1–1	5–2	4–1	0–0	1–2	1–2	2–0	3–1	3–1	4–2	3–3	0–0	1–1
Chemnitzer FC	2–3	2–2	1–0	—	1–3	0–2	0–2	0–2	0–0	0–3	1–1	0–1	1–2	1–3	1–3	1–3	0–2	1–0
MSV Duisburg	4–0	3–3	2–1	1–1	—	0–0	2–1	0–0	0–1	0–2	3–2	1–2	2–2	4–3	2–1	4–1	0–0	1–2
Greuther Fürth	3–0	2–4	1–0	4–1	1–0	—	2–1	3–1	2–1	2–2	0–0	1–2	2–0	1–0	0–1	5–1	2–0	1–0
Hannover 96	0–0	1–1	4–2	0–0	0–2	2–1	—	2–4	3–0	0–0	1–1	3–0	1–1	5–1	3–0	1–1	1–0	2–0
Mainz 05	1–1	2–2	2–4	3–1	1–0	1–0	0–2	—	0–1	0–1	2–0	1–0	2–0	1–1	1–0	1–1	2–2	0–3
Waldhof Mannheim	3–0	0–3	3–3	0–0	1–0	2–1	2–1	4–0	—	4–0	1–4	5–0	2–0	1–1	2–3	2–1	4–2	5–0
Borussia Mönchengladbach	6–1	1–2	0–1	3–0	1–1	3–1	2–0	1–1	3–0	—	1–1	1–0	0–0	1–1	0–0	4–2	1–0	5–0
1. FC Nürnberg	6–1	2–0	2–1	3–1	3–1	0–1	4–2	1–0	1–0	2–1	—	2–1	3–1	2–0	0–1	1–2	2–1	1–2
Rot-Weiß Oberhausen	3–0	1–0	0–0	4–1	1–0	2–2	0–0	1–0	1–2	1–1	1–2	—	5–2	2–0	4–1	2–3	1–3	3–1
VfL Osnabrück	5–1	1–1	1–0	1–1	1–3	2–1	0–1	2–1	0–2	1–3	2–1	0–0	—	0–2	2–2	0–0	4–1	2–1
SSV Reutlingen	3–1	5–1	3–2	2–0	0–1	2–2	3–0	3–2	1–1	3–1	3–2	1–1	2–0	—	8–2	2–0	1–0	2–2
1. FC Saarbrücken	1–3	1–2	1–0	4–1	1–0	2–1	2–1	1–1	3–3	0–4	2–2	3–2	2–1	2–2	—	1–0	1–0	1–1
FC St. Pauli	3–3	3–2	2–0	3–0	1–0	3–3	2–2	2–2	5–0	0–2	1–0	4–1	2–4	1–0	2–2	—	4–0	1–0
Stuttgarter Kickers	0–3	1–1	2–1	4–0	0–0	0–5	2–0	0–0	2–2	1–1	0–2	1–0	2–1	1–0	0–1	0–2	—	2–4
SSV Ulm	3–1	2–0	0–1	3–0	1–3	2–2	3–3	0–2	1–0	2–4	0–1	0–1	1–1	2–3	3–1	1–4	1–1	—

Source: DFB
Legend: Blue = home team win; Yellow = draw; Red = away team win.

== Top scorers ==
The league's top scorers:

Goals	Player	Team
18	(Cameroon) Olivier Djappa	SSV Reutlingen
18	(Poland) Artur Wichniarek	Arminia Bielefeld
16	(Nigeria) Sambo Choji	1. FC Saarbrücken
15	(Germany) Marcel Rath	FC St. Pauli
14	(Netherlands) Arie van Lent	Borussia Mönchengladbach
14	(China) Xie Hui	Alemannia Aachen
13	(Germany) Marcus Feinbier	LR Ahlen
13	(Germany) Thomas Meggle	FC St. Pauli
12	(Belgium) Peter Van Houdt	Borussia Mönchengladbach
11	(Germany) Marc Arnold	LR Ahlen
11	(Cameroon) Cyrille Florent Bella	LR Ahlen
11	(Germany) Martin Driller	1. FC Nürnberg
11	(Germany) Bruno Labbadia	Arminia Bielefeld

== Attendances ==
Rank	Team	Home games	Average attendance
1	Borussia Mönchengladbach	17	23,458
2	1. FC Nürnberg	17	22,418
3	FC St. Pauli	17	17,545
4	ATSV Alemannia 1900	17	12,729
5	Arminia Bielefeld	17	11,519
6	VfL Osnabrück	17	11,396
7	Hannover 96	17	10,881
8	1. FC Saarbrücken	17	10,800
9	SV Waldhof Mannheim	17	8,671
10	SpVgg Greuther Fürth	17	8,259
11	SSV Reutlingen 05	17	8,007
12	MSV Duisburg	17	7,881
13	RW Ahlen	17	7,298
14	SSV Ulm 1846	17	7,294
15	Mainz 05	17	6,042
16	Stuttgarter Kickers	17	5,393
17	RW Oberhausen	17	5,181
18	Chemnitzer FC	17	4,573
