= Oliver Schweißing =

German footballer

Personal information
- Date of birth: 3 March 1971 (age 55)
- Place of birth: Germany
- Height: 1.92 m (6 ft 4 in)
- Position: Midfielder

Senior career*
Years	Team	Apps	(Gls)
1992–1994	Concordia Hamburg		
1994–1997	FC St. Pauli	59	(4)
1997–1998	VfL 93 Hamburg		
1998–1999	VfB Lübeck		
1999–2000	BV Cloppenburg		
2000–2003	VfB Lübeck	47	(5)
2003–2008	TuS Dassendorf		

Managerial career
- 2008–2011: TuS Dassendorf
- * Club domestic league appearances and goals

Oliver Schweißing (born 3 March 1971) is a German former professional footballer who played as a midfielder.
