= Patrick Würll =

German footballer

Personal information
- Date of birth: 16 August 1978 (age 48)
- Place of birth: Schweinfurt, West Germany
- Height: 1.84 m (6 ft 0 in)
- Position: Striker

Youth career
- TSV Sondheim/Grabfeld
- FC Schweinfurt
- –1997: Bayern Munich

Senior career*
Years	Team	Apps	(Gls)
1997–2000	Bayern Munich (A)	81	(25)
2000–2002	Kickers Offenbach	58	(26)
2002–2003	SSV Reutlingen	19	(5)
2003–2004	VfB Lübeck	19	(3)
2004–2006	Holstein Kiel	51	(13)
2006–2008	Dynamo Dresden	32	(3)
2008–2010	Jahn Regensburg	45	(3)
2010–2011	BC Aichach		
2011–2013	VfR Garching	39	(23)
- * Club domestic league appearances and goals

Patrick Würll (born 16 August 1978) is a German former footballer who played as a striker.
