= Darko Dražić =

Footballer (born 1963)

Personal information
- Date of birth: 17 January 1963 (age 63)
- Place of birth: Novi Travnik, SFR Yugoslavia
- Height: 1.88 m (6 ft 2 in)
- Position: Defender

Senior career*
| Years | Team | Apps | (Gls) |
| 1982–1983 | Solin | 22 | (2) |
| 1983–1991 | Hajduk Split | 120 | (4) |
| 1991–1998 | Fortuna Düsseldorf | 128 | (9) |
| 1998–1999 | Šibenik | 25 | (2) |
| 1999–2000 | Rot-Weiß Oberhausen | 5 | (0) |
| Total | | 300 | (17) |

International career
| 1990–1991 | Croatia | 2 | (0) |

Managerial career
- 2000–2001: Fortuna Düsseldorf (Assistant)
- 2001–2002: Fortuna Düsseldorf II
- 2003–2007: Persepolis (Assistant)
- 2007: Pegah Gilan
- 2007–2008: Zmaj Makarska
- 2009: Posušje
- 2010–2011: Damash Lorestan
- 2011: GOŠK Gabela
- 2011–2012: Mes Kerman (Assistant)
- 2012–2013: Damash (Assistant)
- 2015: Segesta
- 2016: Olimpik
- 2017–2018: Mes Kerman
- 2018: Mes Rafsanjan
- * Club domestic league appearances and goals

Darko Dražić (born 17 January 1963) is a Bosnian Croat football manager and former professional player who was most recently the manager of Azadegan League club Mes Rafsanjan.

== Club career ==
Dražić was born in Novi Travnik. He played for Solin, Hajduk Split, Fortuna Düsseldorf, Šibenik and Rot-Weiß Oberhausen.

== International career ==
Dražić made his debut for the Croatia national team in an October 1990 friendly match against the United States and has earned a total of two caps, scoring no goals. His second and final international was a June 1991 friendly away against Slovenia. Since Croatia was still officially part of Yugoslavia at the time, both games were unofficial.

== Managerial career ==
Dražić became the coach of NK GOŠK Gabela in 2011 but resigned after he was selected as assistant manager of Iran Pro League side Mes Kerman by Miroslav Blažević. After about one year working with Mes Kerman's staff, he began his work with Damash as an assistant manager. It was not the first time that one of Amir Abedini's teams used his services because Dražić's professional career in coaching started with Abedini.
