= Sven Demandt =

German football coach and former player

Personal information
- Date of birth: 13 February 1965 (age 61)
- Place of birth: Cologne, West Germany
- Height: 1.86 m (6 ft 1 in)
- Position: Striker

Team information
- Current team: Spvg. Frechen 20 (Manager)

Youth career
- TuS Höhenhaus

Senior career*
Years	Team	Apps	(Gls)
1984–1989	Fortuna Düsseldorf	182	(70)
1989–1990	Bayer Leverkusen	31	(6)
1990–1992	Fortuna Düsseldorf	39	(7)
1992–1994	Hertha BSC	64	(17)
1994–2001	Mainz 05	179	(55)
2002–2003	Viktoria Köln	17	(3)
Total		512	(158)

Managerial career
- 2003–2006: 1. FC Union Solingen
- 2006–2008: Rot-Weiss Essen (U19)
- 2008–2010: Borussia Mönchengladbach (U19)
- 2010–2015: Borussia Mönchengladbach II
- 2015–2016: SV Wehen Wiesbaden
- 2016–2017: Rot-Weiss Essen
- 2019–: Spvg. Frechen 20
- * Club domestic league appearances and goals

Sven Demandt (born 13 February 1965) is a German football coach and former player.

== Honours ==
- 2. Bundesliga top scorer: 1989 (35 goals)
