= André Winkhold =

German footballer and manager

Personal information
- Date of birth: 4 March 1962 (age 64)
- Place of birth: Aachen, West Germany
- Height: 1.80 m (5 ft 11 in)
- Position: Midfielder

Youth career
- Borussia Brand

Senior career*
Years	Team	Apps	(Gls)
1981–1985	Borussia Brand		
1985–1990	Borussia Mönchengladbach	128	(3)
1991–1993	Hertha BSC	92	(3)
1993–1997	Fortuna Düsseldorf	65	(3)
1997–1999	Alemannia Aachen		

Managerial career
- 1999: Alemannia Aachen
- 2002–2003: Alemannia Aachen II
- 2003–2004: Borussia Brand
- 2017–2018: FC Inde Hahn
- * Club domestic league appearances and goals

André Winkhold (born 4 March 1962) is a German football manager and former player who played as a midfielder.
