= Robert Niestroj =

German footballer (born 1976)

Personal information
- Full name: Waldemar Robert Niestroj
- Date of birth: 2 December 1976 (age 49)
- Place of birth: Opole, Poland
- Height: 1.79 m (5 ft 10 in)
- Position: Midfielder

Youth career
- TSV Eller 04
- 1991–1995: Fortuna Düsseldorf

Senior career*
Years	Team	Apps	(Gls)
1995–1998	Fortuna Düsseldorf	44	(8)
1998–2001	Wolverhampton Wanderers	6	(0)
1999–2000	→ 1. FC Nürnberg (loan)	3	(0)
2000–2001	→ Iraklis (loan)	8	(0)
2002–2004	Fortuna Düsseldorf	72	(6)
2004–2005	FC Sachsen Leipzig	27	(3)
2005	Grindavik	16	(2)
2005–2006	Preußen Münster	17	(1)
2006–2007	Panserraikos	14	(1)
2007–2009	SV Straelen	9	(0)
Total		216	(21)
- * Club domestic league appearances and goals

Waldemar Robert Niestroj (born 2 December 1976) is a German former professional footballer who played as a midfielder for a number of clubs in Germany, England, Greece and Iceland.

== Career ==
Niestroj was born in Opole, Silesia, Poland. He began his professional career with Fortuna Düsseldorf, making his debut on 26 April 1997 in a 5–0 loss at Bayern Munich, the only Bundesliga appearance of his career. He broke into the team during the 1997–98 season, scoring seven times, the best seasonal tally of his career.

After a bright start to the following campaign, he was spotted by English First Division side Wolverhampton Wanderers, who bought him in November 1998 for £500,000 as Colin Lee's first signing. He failed to make much impact though and managed just seven appearances in total (six of which came during the 1998–99 season that saw the club miss out on the play-offs on the final day).

Out of favour at Molineux, he spent the rest of his contract on loan at 1. FC Nürnberg and Greek side Iraklis. He then rejoined his former club Fortuna Düsseldorf as a free agent in January 2002, where he remained for a season-and-a-half.

He had short stays at FC Sachsen Leipzig, Icelandic side Grindavik, Preußen Münster and Greeks Panserraikos.

He made his last appearance on 18 May 2008, in the Oberliga for SV Straelen.

== Later life ==
In 2008 Niestroj became a youth coach at his former club Fortuna Düsseldorf. In 2012 he also started working for an insurance company.

== Personal life ==
Niestroj is married and has a daughter.
