= Vlatko Glavaš =

Bosnian politician and footballer (born 1962)

Member of the House of Representatives
- Incumbent
- Assumed office 6 December 2018
- Constituency: 4th Electoral Unit of the FBiH

Personal details
- Born: 2 September 1962 (age 64) Bugojno, PR Bosnia and Herzegovina, FPR Yugoslavia
- Party: Democratic Front
- Height: 1.81 m (5 ft 11 in)
- Education: University of Travnik (BEc)
Association football career
- Position: Midfielder
Youth career
- –1981: Iskra Bugojno
Senior career*
Years	Team	Apps	(Gls)
1981–1991	Iskra Bugojno	291	
1991–1992	Rot-Weiss Essen	7	(1)
1992–1993	Wuppertaler SV	23	(0)
1993–1997	Fortuna Düsseldorf	70	(13)
1997–1998	Osijek	15	(2)
1998–1999	Wuppertaler SV	23	(2)
Total		429	(18)
International career
1994–2000	Bosnia and Herzegovina	6	(0)
Managerial career
- 2005: TuRU Düsseldorf
- 2009: Olimpik
- 2010: Sloboda Tuzla
- 2012: Čelik Zenica
- 2012: Vinogradar
- * Club domestic league appearances and goals

Vlatko Glavaš (Bosnian pronunciation: [ʋlâtko ɡlâʋaːʃ]; born 2 September 1962) is a Bosnian politician and former professional footballer who has served as member of the national House of Representatives since 2018. He is a member of the Democratic Front.

Prior to entering politics, Glavaš started his football career at hometown club Iskra Bugojno. He then went to Germany in 1991, joining Rot-Weiss Essen. He also played for Wuppertaler SV and Fortuna Düsseldorf. Glavaš spent a season at Croatian side Osijek as well. He made his senior international debut for Bosnia and Herzegovina in 1994, earning 6 caps until 2000.

After retiring, Glavaš started working as a manager. He briefly managed TuRU Düsseldorf, Olimpik, Sloboda Tuzla, Čelik Zenica and Vinogradar.

== Club career ==
Born in Bugojno, Glavaš started his career at hometown club Iskra and played a significant part of his career for clubs in Germany.

== International career ==
Glavaš made his debut for Bosnia and Herzegovina in a September 1996 FIFA World Cup qualification match away against Greece and earned a total of six caps, scoring no goals. His final international was a June 1997 World Cup qualification match against Denmark.

== Political career ==
In the 2018 Bosnian general election, Glavaš entered into politics, getting elected to the national House of Representatives as a member of Željko Komšić's Democratic Front. He was re-elected to the House of Representatives in the 2022 general election.

== Honours ==
=== Player ===
Iskra Bugojno

- Yugoslav Second League: 1983–84 (West)
- Mitropa Cup: 1984–85
