= Harald Katemann =

German footballer (born 1972)

Personal information
- Date of birth: 7 July 1972 (age 54)
- Place of birth: Germany
- Height: 1.86 m (6 ft 1 in)
- Position: Midfielder

Youth career
- BW Wertherbruch
- 1. FC Bocholt
- SC 26 Bocholt

Senior career*
Years	Team	Apps	(Gls)
1993–1994	1. FC Bocholt		
1994–1999	Fortuna Düsseldorf	124	(7)
1999–2000	Austria Lustenau	33	(0)
2000–2006	1. FC Bocholt		
- * Club domestic league appearances and goals

Harald Katemann (born 7 July 1972) is a German former professional footballer who played as a midfielder. During his playing career, he was known for his long throw-ins.

== Personal life ==
Following his retirement from playing, Katemann worked as an electrician and coached lower league teams.
