= Raffael Tonello =

Italian footballer

Personal information
- Date of birth: 14 June 1975 (age 51)
- Place of birth: Italy
- Height: 1.79 m (5 ft 10 in)
- Position: Striker

Senior career*
Years	Team	Apps	(Gls)
1994–1997	Fortuna Düsseldorf	25	(4)
1997–2000	Sportfreunde Siegen		
2001	KFC Uerdingen 05	6	(0)
2002	Kickers Offenbach	23	(6)
2002–2004	Eintracht Frankfurt II	12	(4)
Total		66	(14)
- * Club domestic league appearances and goals

Raffael Tonello (born 14 June 1975) is an Italian former footballer who played as a striker. He spent his entire career in Germany.
