= Thomas Allofs =

German footballer

Personal information
- Date of birth: 17 November 1959 (age 66)
- Place of birth: Düsseldorf, West Germany
- Height: 1.74 m (5 ft 9 in)
- Position: Striker

Youth career
- –1978: TuS Gerresheim

Senior career*
Years	Team	Apps	(Gls)
1978–1982	Fortuna Düsseldorf	113	(34)
1982–1986	1. FC Kaiserslautern	126	(61)
1986–1989	1. FC Köln	70	(30)
1989	Strasbourg	11	(2)
1990–1992	Fortuna Düsseldorf	69	(23)
Total		389	(150)

International career
1979–1982	West Germany U21	17	(2)
1979–1988	West Germany B	4	(1)
1985–1988	West Germany	2	(0)
- * Club domestic league appearances and goals

Thomas Allofs (born 17 November 1959) is a German former professional footballer who played as a striker.

The younger brother of another footballer, Klaus Allofs, he was a prolific goalscorer, scoring nearly 200 overall goals as a professional, always playing in the Bundesliga (a brief spell in France notwithstanding).

Allofs represented West Germany at the 1982 World Cup.

== Club career ==
Born in Düsseldorf, Allofs started his professional career aged 19, netting five goals in 17 contests with local giants Fortuna Düsseldorf. In his first year, he combined with sibling Klaus for 29 team goals (out of 70, league's third-best), as Fortuna finished seventh; he also played in five matches in the club's UEFA Cup Winners' Cup runner-up run, including the extra time final loss against FC Barcelona.

In 1982, Allofs joined 1. FC Kaiserslautern, where he proceeded to score at an impressive rate (an average of 15 per season), although the team did not win any silverware. Subsequently, he moved to 1. FC Köln, rejoining with his brother in 1986–87, and being crowned the league's top scorer in his third season, with the team finishing second.

Allofs wrapped up his career in 1992 at his first club, after an unassuming five-month stint in France with RC Strasbourg in the 1989–90 season. He stayed connected with Fortuna as a director.

== International career ==
Allofs was an uncapped (an unused) member for West Germany in the 1982 FIFA World Cup campaign, which ended with runner-up honours. He would receive two caps during three years, the first coming on 16 October 1985 in a 1–0 defeat in Stuttgart against Portugal in a 1986 World Cup qualifier.

== Honours ==
Fortuna Düsseldorf

- DFB-Pokal: 1978–79, 1979–80
- European Cup Winners' Cup: runner-up 1978–79

West Germany

- FIFA World Cup: runner-up 1982

Individual

- Bundesliga top scorer: 1988–89
- kicker Bundesliga Team of the Season: 1990–91
