= Sascha Maier =

German footballer

Personal information
- Full name: 2 January 1974 (age 52)
- Place of birth: Marbach am Neckar, West Germany
- Height: 1.72 m (5 ft 7 1/2 in)
- Position: Striker

Youth career
- VfR Großbottwar
- TSG Steinheim
- –1991: SpVgg 07 Ludwigsburg
- 1991–1992: VfB Stuttgart

Senior career*
Years	Team	Apps	(Gls)
1992–1996	VfB Stuttgart (A)	88	(26)
1993–1996	VfB Stuttgart	1	(0)
1996–1998	SSV Reutlingen	38	(12)
1998–1999	VfR Mannheim	32	(12)
1999–2000	Wacker Burghausen	32	(16)
2000–2001	SV Waldhof Mannheim	6	(1)
2001–2003	SV Darmstadt 98	70	(24)
2003–2004	TSG Hoffenheim	15	(2)
2004–2005	SC Pfullendorf	34	(15)
2005–2007	SV Elversberg	55	(5)
Total		371	(113)
- * Club domestic league appearances and goals

Sascha Maier (born 2 January 1974) is a German former footballer.
