= Thomas Seeliger =

German footballer (born 1966)

Personal information
- Date of birth: 20 September 1966 (age 60)
- Place of birth: Medebach, West Germany
- Height: 1.83 m (6 ft 0 in)
- Position: Midfielder

Senior career*
Years	Team	Apps	(Gls)
1987–1989	Fortuna Düsseldorf	45	(8)
1989–1991	Eintracht Braunschweig	68	(14)
1991–1992	Nancy		
1992–1994	SC Freiburg	64	(12)
1994–1995	1860 Munich	25	(1)
1995	VfL Wolfsburg	12	(3)
1995–1997	Fortuna Düsseldorf	60	(8)
1997–1999	FC St. Pauli	51	(1)
1999–2002	1. SC Norderstedt	78	(18)
2002–2004	SC Victoria Hamburg	27	(6)
2004–2005	Lüneburger SK		
2005–2008	SV Todesfelde		

Managerial career
- 2004: Lüneburger SK
- 2008–2009: TSV Holm
- 2009–2011: Altona 93
- 2011–2012: SV Blankenese
- 2012–2016: Eintracht Norderstedt
- 2017–2020: SC Weiche Flensburg 08 II
- 2020–: SC Weiche Flensburg 08
- * Club domestic league appearances and goals

Thomas Seeliger (born 20 September 1966) is a German former footballer and current manager. He spent four seasons in the Bundesliga with Fortuna Düsseldorf, SC Freiburg, and TSV 1860 Munich.

Since retiring as a player, Seeliger has been a manager at the semi-pro and amateur level in the Hamburg area, and also runs a football school.
