= Rudi Istenič =

Slovenian footballer

Personal information
- Date of birth: 10 January 1971 (age 55)
- Place of birth: Cologne, West Germany
- Height: 1.85 m (6 ft 1 in)
- Position: Midfielder

Youth career
- 1988–1991: Germania Hackenbroich
- 1991–1992: Bayer Dormagen
- 1992–1993: Fortuna Düsseldorf

Senior career*
| Years | Team | Apps | (Gls) |
| 1993–1995 | SV Straelen | | |
| 1995–1999 | Fortuna Düsseldorf | 107 | (3) |
| 1999–2001 | KFC Uerdingen 05 | 59 | (7) |
| 2001–2003 | Eintracht Braunschweig | 17 | (0) |
| 2002–2003 | → Eintracht Braunschweig II | 13 | (10) |
| 2003–2004 | KSV Hessen Kassel | 18 | (0) |
| 2004–2005 | Eintracht Baunatal | | |
| 2005–2006 | SV Siegfried Materborn 1927 | | |

International career
| 1997–2000 | Slovenia | 17 | (0) |
- * Club domestic league appearances and goals

Rudi Istenič (born 10 January 1971) is a Slovenian retired footballer who played as a midfielder.

== Club career ==
Born to Slovenian parents in Cologne, West Germany, he played as a youngster at Germania Hackenbroich and Bayer Dormagen. After a spell at SV Straelen, he played in the Bundesliga with Fortuna Düsseldorf. Later he played for KFC Uerdingen 05, Eintracht Braunschweig and KSV Hessen Kassel.

== International career ==
Istenič made his debut for Slovenia in a September 1997 World Cup qualification match against Greece and earned a total of 17 caps, scoring no goals. He was a participant at the UEFA Euro 2000. His final international was a February 2000 friendly match away against Oman.
