= Karl Werner (footballer) =

German footballer

Personal information
- Date of birth: 21 July 1966 (age 60)
- Height: 1.87 m (6 ft 2 in)
- Position: Defender

Senior career*
Years	Team	Apps	(Gls)
1988–1992	Fortuna Düsseldorf	128	(3)
1992–1993	SpVgg Bayreuth		
1994–1997	Fortuna Düsseldorf	87	(3)
1997–1998	FC St. Pauli	12	(0)
1998–1999	Eintracht Trier		
- * Club domestic league appearances and goals

Karl Werner (born 21 July 1966) is a German former professional footballer who played as a defender.
