= Ryszard Cyroń =

Polish footballer

Personal information
- Full name: Ryszard Piotr Cyroń
- Date of birth: 11 February 1965 (age 61)
- Place of birth: Zabrze, Poland
- Height: 1.76 m (5 ft 9 in)
- Position: Striker

Youth career
- 1975–1984: Sparta Mikulczyce Zabrze

Senior career*
Years	Team	Apps	(Gls)
1984–1991	Górnik Zabrze	196	(76)
1991–1992	Hamburger SV	13	(1)
1992–1997	Fortuna Düsseldorf	131	(47)
1997–1999	Rot-Weiss Essen	40	(13)
1999–2000	SV Hilden-Nord		
2000	Germania Hohdahl		

International career
1988	Poland	2	(0)
- * Club domestic league appearances and goals

Ryszard Piotr Cyroń also known as Richard Cyron (born 11 February 1965) is a Polish former professional footballer who played as a striker.

== Honours ==
Górnik Zabrze

- Ekstraklasa: 1984–85, 1985–86, 1986–87, 1987–88
- Polish Super Cup: 1988

Individual

- Polish Newcomer of the Year: 1987
