= Thorsten Judt =

German footballer

Personal information
- Date of birth: 30 June 1971 (age 55)
- Place of birth: Niederdreisbach, West Germany
- Height: 1.83 m (6 ft 0 in)
- Position: Midfielder

Senior career*
Years	Team	Apps	(Gls)
–1994	Bayer Leverkusen II		
1994–1998	Fortuna Düsseldorf	58	(5)
1998–2003	Rot-Weiß Oberhausen	147	(11)
2003–2008	Kickers Offenbach	153	(10)
2008–2009	Rot-Weiß Erfurt	22	(1)
2009–2010	TuS Bösinghoven		

Managerial career
- 2013–2015: Hamburger SV (juniors)
- * Club domestic league appearances and goals

Thorsten Judt (born 30 June 1971) is a German former professional footballer who played as a midfielder.
