= 1998–99 VfL Bochum season =

VfL Bochum
1998–99 season
- President: Werner Altegoer
- Head Coach: Klaus Toppmöller
- Stadium: Ruhrstadion
- Bundesliga: 17th (relegated)
- DFB-Pokal: Third Round
- Top goalscorer: League: Kuntz (6); All: Reis (7)
- Highest home attendance: 33,063 vs FC Bayern Munich; 4 December 1998
- Lowest home attendance: 20,000 vs 1. FC Nürnberg; 30 April 1999
- Average home league attendance: 23,734
| Home colours | Away colours | Third colours |

The 1998–99 VfL Bochum season was the 61st season in club history.

== Matches ==
=== Legend ===
Win Draw Loss

=== Bundesliga ===
| 15 August 1998 1 | VfL Bochum | 1–2 | SC Freiburg | Bochum |
| 15:30 | Kuntz 73' | | Weißhaupt 47' (pen.); Iashvili 72' | Stadium: Ruhrstadion; Attendance: 24,306; Referee: Lutz Michael Fröhlich (Berlin) |

| 23 August 1998 2 | Hamburger SV | 1–0 | VfL Bochum | Hamburg |
| 18:00 | Dembiński 33' | | | Stadium: Volksparkstadion; Attendance: 23,846; Referee: Helmut Fleischer (Ulm) |

| 8 September 1998 3 | VfL Bochum | 2–0 | SV Werder Bremen | Bochum |
| 20:00 | Fahrenhorst 1'; Toplak 69' | | | Stadium: Ruhrstadion; Attendance: 20,127; Referee: Bernd Heynemann (Magdeburg) |

| 13 September 1998 4 | Borussia Dortmund | 0–1 | VfL Bochum | Dortmund |
| 18:00 | | | Buckley 87' | Stadium: Westfalenstadion; Attendance: 67,000; Referee: Hartmut Strampe (Handorf) |

| 19 September 1998 5 | VfL Bochum | 1–2 | FC Schalke 04 | Bochum |
| 15:30 | Kracht 47' | | Eijkelkamp 52', 70' | Stadium: Ruhrstadion; Attendance: 29,253; Referee: Hermann Albrecht (Kaufbeuren) |

| 26 September 1998 6 | 1. FC Kaiserslautern | 2–3 | VfL Bochum | Kaiserslautern |
| 15:30 | Sundermann 5' (o.g.); Marschall 58' | | Reis 60'; Buckley 67'; Dzafič 74' | Stadium: Fritz-Walter-Stadion; Attendance: 41,500; Referee: Franz-Xaver Wack (Biberbach) |

| 3 October 1998 7 | VfL Bochum | 0–0 | Eintracht Frankfurt | Bochum |
| 15:30 | | | | Stadium: Ruhrstadion; Attendance: 26,357; Referee: Georg Dardenne (Nettersheim) |

| 16 October 1998 8 | TSV 1860 Munich | 2–1 | VfL Bochum | Munich |
| 20:00 | Winkler 4'; Hobsch 21' | | Schindzielorz 7' | Stadium: Olympiastadion; Attendance: 32,500; Referee: Florian Meyer (Burgdorf) |

| 24 October 1998 9 | VfL Bochum | 2–1 | Borussia Mönchengladbach | Bochum |
| 15:30 | Reis 16'; Schindzielorz 47' | | Pflipsen 11' | Stadium: Ruhrstadion; Attendance: 26,433; Referee: Jürgen Aust (Cologne) |

| 31 October 1998 10 | VfB Stuttgart | 4–2 | VfL Bochum | Stuttgart |
| 15:30 | Akpoborie 1', 47'; Ernst 11' (o.g.); Ristić 87' | | Gaudino 6'; Reis 53' | Stadium: Gottlieb-Daimler-Stadion; Attendance: 22,000; Referee: Markus Merk (Otterbach) |

| 7 November 1998 11 | VfL Bochum | 2–0 | Hertha BSC | Bochum |
| 15:30 | Sundermann 60'; Drinčić 89' | | | Stadium: Ruhrstadion; Attendance: 21,016; Referee: Helmut Fleischer (Ulm) |

| 11 November 1998 12 | 1. FC Nürnberg | 2–2 | VfL Bochum | Nuremberg |
| 19:30 | Wiesinger 19'; Kuka 46' | | Kuntz 44' (pen.), 71' (pen.) | Stadium: Frankenstadion; Attendance: 23,800; Referee: Lutz Wagner (Kriftel) |

| 14 November 1998 13 | MSV Duisburg | 2–0 | VfL Bochum | Duisburg |
| 15:30 | Wedau 30'; Andersen 74' | | | Stadium: Wedaustadion; Attendance: 11,032; Referee: Jörg Keßler (Höhenkirchen) |

| 21 November 1998 14 | VfL Bochum | 1–5 | Bayer 04 Leverkusen | Bochum |
| 15:30 | Reis 64' | | Beinlich 15'; Živković 43'; Rink 61'; Heintze 71'; N. Kovač 78' | Stadium: Ruhrstadion; Attendance: 20,128; Referee: Herbert Fandel (Kyllburg) |

| 28 November 1998 15 | VfL Wolfsburg | 4–1 | VfL Bochum | Wolfsburg |
| 15:30 | Juskowiak 1', 20'; Präger 76'; Greiner 78' | | Ion 36' | Stadium: VfL-Stadion am Elsterweg; Attendance: 14,050; Referee: Peter Sippel (Munich) |

| 4 December 1998 16 | VfL Bochum | 2–2 | FC Bayern Munich | Bochum |
| 20:00 | Hofmann 3'; Kuntz 87' (pen.) | | Jancker 45'; Strunz 88' (pen.) | Stadium: Ruhrstadion; Attendance: 33,063; Referee: Bernd Heynemann (Magdeburg) |

| 12 December 1998 17 | FC Hansa Rostock | 3–0 | VfL Bochum | Rostock |
| 15:30 | Neuville 21', 86'; Majak 78' | | | Stadium: Ostseestadion; Attendance: 9,500; Referee: Franz-Xaver Wack (Biberbach) |

| 18 December 1998 18 | SC Freiburg | 1–1 | VfL Bochum | Freiburg |
| 20:00 | Baya 50' | | Schindzielorz 90' | Stadium: Dreisamstadion; Attendance: 22,000; Referee: Edgar Steinborn (Sinzig) |

| 16 March 1999 19 | VfL Bochum | 2–0 | Hamburger SV | Bochum |
| 20:00 | Fischer 21' (o.g.); Mahdavikia 81' | | | Stadium: Ruhrstadion; Attendance: 24,603; Referee: Georg Dardenne (Nettersheim) |

| 26 February 1999 20 | SV Werder Bremen | 1–1 | VfL Bochum | Bremen |
| 20:00 | Aílton 87' | | Kuntz 20' | Stadium: Weserstadion; Attendance: 26,715; Referee: Wolfgang Stark (Ergolding) |

| 6 March 1999 21 | VfL Bochum | 0–1 | Borussia Dortmund | Bochum |
| 15:30 | | | Ricken 29' | Stadium: Ruhrstadion; Attendance: 30,195; Referee: Markus Merk (Otterbach) |

| 13 March 1999 22 | FC Schalke 04 | 2–2 | VfL Bochum | Gelsenkirchen |
| 15:30 | Mulder 18' (pen.); Büskens 28' | | Reis 20' (pen.); Baştürk 23' | Stadium: Parkstadion; Attendance: 47,700; Referee: Lutz Michael Fröhlich (Berlin) |

| 20 March 1999 23 | VfL Bochum | 1–2 | 1. FC Kaiserslautern | Bochum |
| 15:30 | Zeyer 42' | | Ratinho 59'; Rösler 86' | Stadium: Ruhrstadion; Attendance: 23,670; Referee: Hartmut Strampe (Handorf) |

| 4 April 1999 24 | Eintracht Frankfurt | 1–0 | VfL Bochum | Frankfurt am Main |
| 18:00 | Fjørtoft 86' | | | Stadium: Waldstadion; Attendance: 32,200; Referee: Torsten Koop (Lüttenmark) |

| 11 April 1999 25 | VfL Bochum | 2–0 | TSV 1860 Munich | Bochum |
| 18:00 | Buckley 56'; Zeyer 90' | | | Stadium: Ruhrstadion; Attendance: 20,395; Referee: Lutz Wagner (Kriftel) |

| 14 April 1999 26 | Borussia Mönchengladbach | 2–2 | VfL Bochum | Mönchengladbach |
| 20:00 | Ašanin 65'; Paßlack 90' | | Peschel 76'; Mahdavikia 90' | Stadium: Bökelbergstadion; Attendance: 16,000; Referee: Bernd Heynemann (Magdeburg) |

| 17 April 1999 27 | VfL Bochum | 3–3 | VfB Stuttgart | Bochum |
| 15:30 | Mahdavikia 60' (pen.); Michalke 75'; Buckley 79' | | Akpoborie 42', 45', 53' | Stadium: Ruhrstadion; Attendance: 21,283; Referee: Helmut Fleischer (Ulm) |

| 24 April 1999 28 | Hertha BSC | 4–1 | VfL Bochum | Berlin |
| 15:30 | Wosz 14', 80'; Herzog 18'; Hartmann 37' | | Buckley 72' | Stadium: Olympiastadion; Attendance: 45,646; Referee: Winfried Buchhart (Schrobenhausen) |

| 30 April 1999 29 | VfL Bochum | 0–3 | 1. FC Nürnberg | Bochum |
| 20:00 | | | Ćirić 16', 70'; Kurth 65' | Stadium: Ruhrstadion; Attendance: 20,000; Referee: Alfons Berg (Konz) |

| 5 May 1999 30 | VfL Bochum | 0–2 | MSV Duisburg | Bochum |
| 19:30 | | | Hajto 25'; Wohlert 55' | Stadium: Ruhrstadion; Attendance: 22,107; Referee: Bernhard Zerr (Ottersweier) |

| 8 May 1999 31 | Bayer 04 Leverkusen | 2–0 | VfL Bochum | Leverkusen |
| 15:30 | Kirsten 21'; Hejduk 63' | | | Stadium: Ulrich-Haberland-Stadion; Attendance: 22,500; Referee: Uwe Kemmling (Kleinburgwedel) |

| 15 May 1999 32 | VfL Bochum | 0–2 | VfL Wolfsburg | Bochum |
| 15:30 | | | Thomsen 27'; Baumgart 74' | Stadium: Ruhrstadion; Attendance: 20,194; Referee: Edgar Steinborn (Sinzig) |

| 22 May 1999 33 | FC Bayern Munich | 4–2 | VfL Bochum | Munich |
| 15:30 | Basler 50'; Jancker 60'; Scholl 78'; Salihamidžić 89' | | Gaudino 43'; Zeyer 64' | Stadium: Olympiastadion; Attendance: 63,000; Referee: Lutz Michael Fröhlich (Berlin) |

| 29 May 1999 34 | VfL Bochum | 2–3 | FC Hansa Rostock | Bochum |
| 15:30 | Kuntz 71'; Peschel 74' | | Neuville 37'; Agali 77'; Majak 83' | Stadium: Ruhrstadion; Attendance: 20,347; Referee: Markus Merk (Otterbach) |

=== DFB-Pokal ===
| 30 August 1998 R1 | FSV Zwickau | 2–5 | VfL Bochum | Zwickau |
| 15:00 | Milde 49' (pen.), 82' | | Peschel 40'; Fahrenhorst 48'; Michalke 54'; Reis 66' (pen.), 90' | Stadium: Westsachsenstadion; Attendance: 4,287; Referee: Michael Wendorf (Gransee) |

| 22 September 1998 R2 | 1. FC Kaiserslautern | 1–1 (a.e.t.) (4–5 p) | VfL Bochum | Kaiserslautern |
| 19:30 | Rösler 6' (pen.) | | Petrović 58' (pen.) | Stadium: Fritz-Walter-Stadion; Attendance: 23,171; Referee: Winfried Buchhart (Schrobenhausen) |
| | Penalties |
| | Schjønberg (penalty missed); Rische (penalty scored); Marschall (penalty scored); Ballack (penalty scored); Ibrahim (penalty scored); Riedl (penalty missed) | | Sundermann (penalty scored); Baştürk (penalty missed); Petrović (penalty scored); Dzafič (penalty scored); Hofmann (penalty scored); Schindzielorz (penalty scored) |

| 27 October 1998 R3 | VfL Bochum | 0–1 | Borussia Mönchengladbach | Bochum |
| 19:30 | | | Polster 10' | Stadium: Ruhrstadion; Attendance: 21,460; Referee: Edgar Steinborn (Sinzig) |

== Squad ==
=== Squad and statistics ===
==== Squad, appearances and goals scored ====
| No. | Pos | Nat | Player | Total | | Bundesliga | | DFB-Pokal | |
| No. | Pos | Nat | Player | Apps | Goals | Apps | Goals | Apps | Goals |
|---|---|---|---|---|---|---|---|---|---|
| 1 | GK | (Germany) GER | Maik Kischko | 3 | 0 | 2 | 0 | 1 | 0 |
| 2 | DF | (Germany) GER | Thomas Stickroth | 3 | 0 | 3 | 0 | 0 | 0 |
| 3 | DF | (Germany) GER | Torsten Kracht | 28 | 1 | 26 | 1 | 2 | 0 |
| 4 | DF | (Germany) GER | Mirko Dickhaut | 3 | 0 | 3 | 0 | 0 | 0 |
| 5 | DF | (Poland) POL | Tomasz Wałdoch | 30 | 0 | 27 | 0 | 3 | 0 |
| 6 | DF | (Croatia) CRO | Samir Toplak | 25 | 1 | 23 | 1 | 2 | 0 |
| 7 | MF | (Germany) GER | Kai Michalke | 13 | 2 | 12 | 1 | 1 | 1 |
| 8 | MF | (Germany) GER | Peter Peschel | 18 | 3 | 16 | 2 | 2 | 1 |
| 9 | FW | (Federal Republic of Yugoslavia) YUG | Zdravko Drinčić | 16 | 1 | 16 | 1 | 0 | 0 |
| 10 | MF | (Germany) GER | Maurizio Gaudino | 21 | 2 | 20 | 2 | 1 | 0 |
| 11 | FW | (Germany) GER | Stefan Kuntz | 21 | 6 | 20 | 6 | 1 | 0 |
| 12 | MF | (Turkey) TUR | Yıldıray Baştürk | 31 | 1 | 28 | 1 | 3 | 0 |
| 13 | MF | (Germany) GER | Norbert Hofmann | 30 | 2 | 27 | 1 | 3 | 1 |
| 14 | MF | (Slovenia) SVN | Emir Dzafič | 7 | 2 | 6 | 1 | 1 | 1 |
| 15 | DF | (Germany) GER | Jan Holland (until 31 December 1998) | 0 | 0 | 0 | 0 | 0 | 0 |
| 15 | MF | (Germany) GER | Andreas Zeyer (since 1 January 1999) | 11 | 3 | 11 | 3 | 0 | 0 |
| 16 | MF | (Germany) GER | Björn Joppe | 3 | 0 | 3 | 0 | 0 | 0 |
| 17 | MF | (Germany) GER | Olaf Schreiber | 11 | 0 | 10 | 0 | 1 | 0 |
| 18 | FW | (South Africa) RSA | Delron Buckley | 36 | 5 | 33 | 5 | 3 | 0 |
| 19 | DF | (Germany) GER | Axel Sundermann | 34 | 2 | 31 | 1 | 3 | 1 |
| 20 | DF | (Croatia) CRO | Alen Petrović | 9 | 2 | 7 | 0 | 2 | 2 |
| 21 | GK | (Germany) GER | Thomas Ernst | 34 | 0 | 32 | 0 | 2 | 0 |
| 22 | DF | (Germany) GER | Thomas Reis | 27 | 7 | 25 | 5 | 2 | 2 |
| 24 | FW | (Turkey) TUR | Neşat Gülünoğlu | 14 | 0 | 12 | 0 | 2 | 0 |
| 25 | DF | (Germany) GER | Frank Fahrenhorst | 21 | 2 | 18 | 1 | 3 | 1 |
| 26 | MF | (Germany) GER | Sebastian Schindzielorz | 30 | 4 | 28 | 3 | 2 | 1 |
| 28 | DF | (Germany) GER | Michael Bemben | 9 | 0 | 8 | 0 | 1 | 0 |
| 29 | FW | (Poland) POL | Jacek Ratajczak | 0 | 0 | 0 | 0 | 0 | 0 |
| 31 | FW | (Germany) GER | Jan Majewski | 2 | 0 | 1 | 0 | 1 | 0 |
| 32 | MF | (Romania) ROU | Viorel Ion (since 1 October 1998) | 12 | 1 | 12 | 1 | 0 | 0 |
| 33 | MF | (Iran) IRN | Mehdi Mahdavikia (since 1 January 1999) | 12 | 3 | 12 | 3 | 0 | 0 |

=== Transfers ===
==== Summer ====
In:

| No. | Pos. | Nation | Player |
|---|---|---|---|
| 1 | GK | GER | Maik Kischko (from FC Carl Zeiss Jena) |
| 6 | DF | CRO | Samir Toplak (from NK Varteks) |
| 9 | FW | YUG | Zdravko Drinčić (from FK Vojvodina) |
| 10 | MF | GER | Maurizio Gaudino (from FC Basel) |
| 11 | FW | GER | Stefan Kuntz (from Arminia Bielefeld) |
| 14 | MF | SVN | Emir Dzafič (from NK Beltinci) |
| 16 | MF | GER | Björn Joppe (from VfL Bochum II) |
| 20 | DF | CRO | Alen Petrović (from GNK Dinamo Zagreb) |
| 26 | MF | GER | Sebastian Schindzielorz (from VfL Bochum II) |
| 28 | DF | GER | Michael Bemben (from VfL Bochum II) |
| 29 | FW | POL | Jacek Ratajczak (from Flota Świnoujście) |
| 31 | FW | GER | Jan Majewski (from VfL Bochum II) |

Out:

| No. | Pos. | Nation | Player |
|---|---|---|---|
| 1 | GK | GER | Uwe Gospodarek (to 1. FC Kaiserslautern) |
| 6 | MF | GER | Peter Közle (to 1. FC Union Berlin) |
| 9 | FW | POL | Henryk Bałuszyński (on loan to Arminia Bielefeld) |
| 10 | MF | GER | Dariusz Wosz (to Hertha BSC) |
| 11 | FW | BUL | Georgi Donkov (to 1. FC Köln) |
| 14 | DF | GER | Karsten Hutwelker (to 1. FC Köln) |
| 15 | FW | GER | Danny Winkler (to Stuttgarter Kickers) |
| 16 | MF | GER | Mirko Reichel (to SpVgg Greuther Fürth) |
| 20 | MF | CRO | Zoran Mamić (to Bayer 04 Leverkusen) |
| 23 | FW | RUS | Sergei Yuran (released) |

==== Winter ====
In:

| No. | Pos. | Nation | Player |
|---|---|---|---|
| 15 | MF | GER | Andreas Zeyer (from Karlsruher SC) |
| 32 | MF | ROU | Viorel Ion (from FC Oțelul Galați) |
| 33 | MF | IRN | Mehdi Mahdavikia (from Persepolis F.C.) |

Out:

| No. | Pos. | Nation | Player |

== VfL Bochum II ==
| No. | Pos | Nat | Player | Total | | Oberliga Westfalen | |
| No. | Pos | Nat | Player | Apps | Goals | Apps | Goals |
|---|---|---|---|---|---|---|---|
| | MF | (Germany) GER | Andreas Becker | 10 | 0 | 10 | 0 |
| | DF | (Germany) GER | Michael Bemben | 24 | 2 | 24 | 2 |
| | MF | (Germany) GER | Christian Brücker | 11 | 0 | 11 | 0 |
| | FW | (Greece) GRE | Achilleas Courtoglou | 8 | 0 | 8 | 0 |
| | MF | (Cameroon) CMR | Francis-Joseph Etouké | 18 | 1 | 18 | 1 |
| | MF | (Germany) GER | Paul Freier | 26 | 6 | 26 | 6 |
| | FW | (Poland) POL | Arek Grad | 29 | 17 | 29 | 17 |
| | DF | (Germany) GER | Jan Holland | 25 | 4 | 25 | 4 |
| | DF | (Germany) GER | Gerrit Hundshagen | 22 | 1 | 22 | 1 |
| | MF | (Germany) GER | Björn Joppe | 23 | 7 | 23 | 7 |
| | DF | (Germany) GER | Peter Kluth | 8 | 0 | 8 | 0 |
| | MF | (Germany) GER | Sascha Lindner | 26 | 0 | 26 | 0 |
| | FW | (Germany) GER | Jan Majewski | 26 | 13 | 26 | 13 |
| | MF | (Germany) GER | Nicolas Michaty | 6 | 0 | 6 | 0 |
| | DF | (Germany) GER | Björn Müller | 12 | 0 | 12 | 0 |
| | DF | (Turkey) TUR | Aykan Özer | 23 | 0 | 23 | 0 |
| | FW | (Poland) POL | Jacek Ratajczak | 23 | 10 | 23 | 10 |
| | MF | (Germany) GER | Sebastian Schindzielorz | 3 | 2 | 3 | 2 |
| | MF | (Germany) GER | Damian Schindzielorz | 28 | 1 | 28 | 1 |
| | GK | (Germany) GER | Klaus Schlapka | 1 | 0 | 1 | 0 |
| | GK | (Germany) GER | Stefan Wächter | 30 | 0 | 30 | 0 |
| | MF | (Germany) GER | Aydin Will | 13 | 0 | 13 | 0 |
| | DF | (Turkey) TUR | Bekir Burak Yarar | 12 | 0 | 12 | 0 |
