= 1996–97 VfL Bochum season =

VfL Bochum
1996–97 season
- President: Werner Altegoer
- Head Coach: Klaus Toppmöller
- Stadium: Ruhrstadion
- Bundesliga: 5th
- DFB-Pokal: Quarter-finals
- Top goalscorer: League: Donkov (10); All: Donkov (10)
- Highest home attendance: 36,344 (vs Borussia Dortmund, 4 October 1996; vs FC Bayern Munich, 22 February 1997)
- Lowest home attendance: 20,498 (vs Karlsruher SC, 7 September 1996)
- Average home league attendance: 28,484
Home colours	Away colours	Third colours

The 1996–97 VfL Bochum season was the 59th season in club history.

== Matches ==
=== Legend ===
Win Draw Loss

=== Bundesliga ===
17 August 1996 1	VfL Bochum	1 – 0	MSV Duisburg	Bochum
15:30	Közle 31'			Stadium: Ruhrstadion; Attendance: 28,142; Referee: Hermann Albrecht (Kaufbeuren)

21 August 1996 2	FC Bayern Munich	1 – 1	VfL Bochum	Munich
19:30	Rizzitelli 52'		Peschel 73'	Stadium: Olympiastadion; Attendance: 60,000; Referee: Uwe Kemmling (Kleinburgwedel)

24 August 1996 3	VfL Bochum	1 – 1	Arminia Bielefeld	Bochum
15:30	Jack 65'		Molata 58'	Stadium: Ruhrstadion; Attendance: 24,117; Referee: Bernhard Zerr (Ottersweier)

27 August 1996 4	FC Schalke 04	1 – 1	VfL Bochum	Gelsenkirchen
20:00	Thon 2'		Donkov 87'	Stadium: Parkstadion; Attendance: 33,230; Referee: Edgar Steinborn (Sinzig)

7 September 1996 5	VfL Bochum	3 – 1	Karlsruher SC	Bochum
15:30	Donkov 32'; Wosz 72', 82'		Häßler 70' (pen.)	Stadium: Ruhrstadion; Attendance: 20,498; Referee: Hartmut Strampe (Handorf)

13 September 1996 6	SV Werder Bremen	5 – 1	VfL Bochum	Bremen
20:00	Bode 17'; Herzog 32'; Labbadia 38', 56', 67'		Hutwelker 85'	Stadium: Weserstadion; Attendance: 27,900; Referee: Franz-Xaver Wack (Biberbach)

21 September 1996 7	VfL Bochum	3 – 1	Hamburger SV	Bochum
15:30	Bałuszyński 17'; Mamić 67'; Michalke 90'		Breitenreiter 76'	Stadium: Ruhrstadion; Attendance: 24,135; Referee: Georg Dardenne (Nettersheim)

27 September 1996 8	1. FC Köln	2 – 0	VfL Bochum	Cologne
20:00	Vlădoiu 56'; Oliseh 76' (pen.)			Stadium: Radrennbahn Müngersdorf; Attendance: 23,000; Referee: Torsten Koop (Lüttenmark)

4 October 1996 9	VfL Bochum	1 – 0	Borussia Dortmund	Bochum
20:00	Wałdoch 63'			Stadium: Ruhrstadion; Attendance: 36,344; Referee: Bernd Heynemann (Magdeburg)

13 October 1996 10	Fortuna Düsseldorf	2 – 2	VfL Bochum	Düsseldorf
18:00	Seeliger 18'; Glavaš 21' (pen.)		Közle 50', 75'	Stadium: Rheinstadion; Attendance: 20,000; Referee: Alfons Berg (Konz)

18 October 1996 11	VfL Bochum	2 – 2	TSV 1860 Munich	Bochum
20:00	Guðjónsson 61'; Reis 66'		Winkler 25'; Walker 66'	Stadium: Ruhrstadion; Attendance: 25,442; Referee: Hans-Peter Best (Kämpfelbach)

27 October 1996 12	SC Freiburg	0 – 1	VfL Bochum	Freiburg
18:00			Peschel 9'	Stadium: Dreisamstadion; Attendance: 22,500; Referee: Hartmut Strampe (Handorf)

1 November 1996 13	VfL Bochum	1 – 0	FC Hansa Rostock	Bochum
20:00	Peschel 58'			Stadium: Ruhrstadion; Attendance: 27,712; Referee: Lutz Wagner (Kriftel)

16 November 1996 14	VfB Stuttgart	3 – 1	VfL Bochum	Stuttgart
15:30	Élber 15'; Hagner 24'; Poschner 30'		Közle 20'	Stadium: Gottlieb-Daimler-Stadion; Attendance: 40,000; Referee: Jürgen Aust (Cologne)

22 November 1996 15	VfL Bochum	2 – 0	Borussia Mönchengladbach	Bochum
20:00	Donkov 16'; Közle 55'			Stadium: Ruhrstadion; Attendance: 30,271; Referee: Georg Dardenne (Nettersheim)

9 April 1997 16	FC St. Pauli	2 – 1	VfL Bochum	Wilhelm-Koch-Stadion
20:00	Émerson 6'; Scharping 8'		Kracht 75'	Stadium: Hamburg; Attendance: 20,152; Referee: Burkard Hufgard (Mömbris)

6 December 1996 17	VfL Bochum	2 – 2	Bayer 04 Leverkusen	Bochum
20:00	Stickroth 29' (pen.); Wosz 89'		Kirsten 18'; Ramelow 56'	Stadium: Ruhrstadion; Attendance: 24,602; Referee: Winfried Buchhart (Schrobenhausen)

15 February 1997 18	MSV Duisburg	1 – 1	VfL Bochum	Duisburg
15:30	Marin 23' (pen.)		Wosz 45'	Stadium: Wedaustadion; Attendance: 20,200; Referee: Jürgen Aust (Cologne)

22 February 1997 19	VfL Bochum	1 – 1	FC Bayern Munich	Bochum
15:30	Kracht 55'		Klinsmann 66'	Stadium: Ruhrstadion; Attendance: 36,344; Referee: Bernd Heynemann (Magdeburg)

28 February 1997 20	Arminia Bielefeld	3 – 1	VfL Bochum	Bielefeld
20:00	Meißner 43', 45'; Maul 71'		Wosz 84'	Stadium: Bielefeld; Attendance: 22,512; Referee: Hans-Jürgen Weber (Essen)

7 March 1997 21	VfL Bochum	0 – 1	FC Schalke 04	Bochum
20:00			Eigenrauch 70'	Stadium: Ruhrstadion; Attendance: 33,141; Referee: Hartmut Strampe (Handorf)

11 March 1997 22	Karlsruher SC	2 – 3	VfL Bochum	Karlsruhe
19:30	Kiriakov 9'; Fink 47'		Közle 2'; Stickroth 35'; Donkov 57'	Stadium: Wildparkstadion; Attendance: 22,000; Referee: Winfried Buchhart (Schrobenhausen)

16 March 1997 23	VfL Bochum	3 – 2	SV Werder Bremen	Bochum
18:00	Donkov 38'; Gülünoğlu 53'; Michalke 72'		van Lent 75'; Herzog 85'	Stadium: Ruhrstadion; Attendance: 25,392; Referee: Torsten Koop (Lüttenmark)

22 March 1997 24	Hamburger SV	2 – 2	VfL Bochum	Hamburg
15:30	Salihamidžić 30'; Breitenreiter 90'		Donkov 25'; Reis 75'	Stadium: Volksparkstadion; Attendance: 21,898; Referee: Bernhard Zerr (Ottersweier)

27 March 1997 25	VfL Bochum	2 – 2	1. FC Köln	Bochum
20:00	Stickroth 16' (pen.); Schreiber 76'		Hauptmann 45'; Polster 51' (pen.)	Stadium: Ruhrstadion; Attendance: 33,300; Referee: Markus Merk (Otterbach)

5 April 1997 26	Borussia Dortmund	2 – 0	VfL Bochum	Dortmund
15:30	Chapuisat 34', 72' (pen.)			Stadium: Westfalenstadion; Attendance: 55,000; Referee: Georg Dardenne (Nettersheim)

13 April 1997 27	VfL Bochum	3 – 1	Fortuna Düsseldorf	Bochum
18:00	Katemann 21' (o.g.); Michalke 24'; Donkov 45'		Fach 68'	Stadium: Ruhrstadion; Attendance: 27,070; Referee: Franz-Xaver Wack (Biberbach)

19 April 1997 28	TSV 1860 Munich	0 – 1	VfL Bochum	Munich
15:30			Donkov 20'	Stadium: Olympiastadion; Attendance: 53,000; Referee: Uwe Kemmling (Kleinburgwedel)

26 April 1997 29	VfL Bochum	3 – 2	SC Freiburg	Bochum
15:30	Wosz 6', 77'; Gülünoğlu 60'		Sundermann 22'; Spies 53'	Stadium: Ruhrstadion; Attendance: 23,209; Referee: Detlef Schütz (Norken)

2 May 1997 30	FC Hansa Rostock	0 – 0	VfL Bochum	Rostock
19:30				Stadium: Ostseestadion; Attendance: 20,700; Referee: Alfons Berg (Konz)

10 May 1997 31	VfL Bochum	2 – 1	VfB Stuttgart	Bochum
15:30	Michalke 69'; Peschel 79'		Hagner 61'	Stadium: Ruhrstadion; Attendance: 34,393; Referee: Michael Malbranc (Hamburg)

17 May 1997 32	Borussia Mönchengladbach	6 – 2	VfL Bochum	Mönchengladbach
15:30	Schneider 60'; Neun 68'; Dahlin 71', 89'; Lupescu 73' (pen.); Juskowiak 75'		Wosz 35'; Hutwelker 83'	Stadium: Bökelbergstadion; Attendance: 30,100; Referee: Edgar Steinborn (Sinzig)

24 May 1997 33	VfL Bochum	6 – 0	FC St. Pauli	Bochum
15:30	Donkov 35', 68'; Peschel 72'; Gülünoğlu 73'; Wosz 78'; Pfennig 89' (o.g.)			Stadium: Ruhrstadion; Attendance: 30,121; Referee: Lutz Michael Fröhlich (Berlin)

31 May 1997 34	Bayer 04 Leverkusen	2 – 0	VfL Bochum	Leverkusen
15:30	Sérgio 9'; Ramelow 51'			Stadium: Ulrich-Haberland-Stadion; Attendance: 22,000; Referee: Jürgen Jansen (Essen)

=== DFB-Pokal ===
10 August 1996 R1	SV Bonlanden	2 – 4 (a.e.t.)	VfL Bochum	Bonlanden
15:30	Schweizer 64'; Frömmel 71'		Kracht 73'; Winkler 86'; Peschel 119', 120'	Stadium: Stadion an der Humboldtstraße; Attendance: 3,000; Referee: Jörg Friedrichs (Ilvesheim)

1 October 1996 R2	FC Schalke 04	2 – 3	VfL Bochum	Gelsenkirchen
20:00	Wilmots 35'; Held 47'		Guðjónsson 1', 30'; Bałuszyński 60'	Stadium: Parkstadion; Attendance: 20,150; Referee: Michael Malbranc (Hamburg)

22 October 1996 R3	Karlsruher SC II	0 – 1	VfL Bochum	Karlsruhe
19:30			Közle 66'	Stadium: Wildparkstadion, Platz 2 Attendance: 3,000; Referee: Christian Wack (Gersheim)

13 November 1996 QF	Hamburger SV	2 – 1	VfL Bochum	Hamburg
19:30	Schopp 39'; Cardoso 82'		Közle 63'	Stadium: Volksparkstadion; Attendance: 17,240; Referee: Lutz Michael Fröhlich (Berlin)

== Squad ==
=== Squad and statistics ===
==== Squad, appearances and goals scored ====
No.	Pos	Nat	Player	Total		Bundesliga		DFB-Pokal	
No.	Pos	Nat	Player	Apps	Goals	Apps	Goals	Apps	Goals
1	GK	(Germany) GER	Uwe Gospodarek	37	0	33	0	4	0
2	DF	(Germany) GER	Thomas Stickroth	33	3	30	3	3	0
3	DF	(Germany) GER	Torsten Kracht	33	3	29	2	4	1
4	DF	(Bulgaria) BUL	Engibar Engibarov (until 31 December 1996)	0	0	0	0	0	0
5	DF	(Poland) POL	Tomasz Wałdoch	33	1	29	1	4	0
6	MF	(Germany) GER	Peter Közle	32	8	28	6	4	2
7	MF	(Germany) GER	Kai Michalke	25	4	25	4	0	0
8	MF	(Germany) GER	Peter Peschel	25	7	22	5	3	2
9	FW	(Poland) POL	Henryk Bałuszyński	27	2	23	1	4	1
10	MF	(Germany) GER	Dariusz Wosz	36	9	32	9	4	0
11	FW	(Bulgaria) BUL	Georgi Donkov	34	10	30	10	4	0
12	DF	(Germany) GER	Christian Herrmann	0	0	0	0	0	0
13	DF	(Germany) GER	Max Eberl	7	0	6	0	1	0
14	DF	(Germany) GER	Karsten Hutwelker	18	2	15	2	3	0
15	FW	(Germany) GER	Danny Winkler	7	1	6	0	1	1
16	FW	(South Africa) RSA	Delron Buckley	3	0	2	0	1	0
17	MF	(Germany) GER	Olaf Schreiber	27	1	24	1	3	0
18	FW	(Germany) GER	Roland Wohlfarth	5	0	5	0	0	0
19	DF	(Germany) GER	Mathias Jack	31	1	29	1	2	0
20	MF	(Croatia) CRO	Zoran Mamić	27	1	23	1	4	0
21	GK	(Germany) GER	Thomas Ernst	1	0	1	0	0	0
22	DF	(Germany) GER	Thomas Reis	37	2	34	2	3	0
23	MF	(Croatia) CRO	Filip Tapalović	21	0	20	0	1	0
24	MF	(Iceland) ISL	Þórður Guðjónsson	16	3	13	1	3	2
25	FW	(Turkey) TUR	Neşat Gülünoğlu (since 11 March 1997)	11	3	11	3	0	0
29	DF	(Germany) GER	Frank Fahrenhorst (since 15 February 1997)	4	0	4	0	0	0
31	GK	(Germany) GER	Stefan Wächter	0	0	0	0	0	0

=== Transfers ===
==== Summer ====
In:

No.	Pos.	Nation	Player
4	DF	BUL	Engibar Engibarov (from PFC CSKA Sofia)
11	FW	BUL	Georgi Donkov (from PFC CSKA Sofia)
14	DF	GER	Karsten Hutwelker (from FC Carl Zeiss Jena)
15	FW	GER	Danny Winkler (from TSG Pfeddersheim)
17	MF	GER	Olaf Schreiber (from FSV Zwickau)
20	MF	CRO	Zoran Mamić (from GNK Dinamo Zagreb)

Out:

No.	Pos.	Nation	Player
11	FW	USA	Eric Wynalda (to San Jose Clash)
17	MF	GER	Frank Heinemann (retired)
24	MF	GER	Andreas Wieczorek (to Sportfreunde Siegen)
30	MF	POL	Andrzej Rudy (to Lierse S.K.)
31	MF	GER	Thorsten Schmugge (to Hibernian F.C.)

==== Winter ====
In:

No.	Pos.	Nation	Player
25	FW	TUR	Neşat Gülünoğlu (from VfL Bochum U-19)
29	DF	GER	Frank Fahrenhorst (from VfL Bochum II)

Out:

No.	Pos.	Nation	Player
4	DF	BUL	Engibar Engibarov (to PFC Slavia Sofia)
