= Tim Jerat =

German footballer

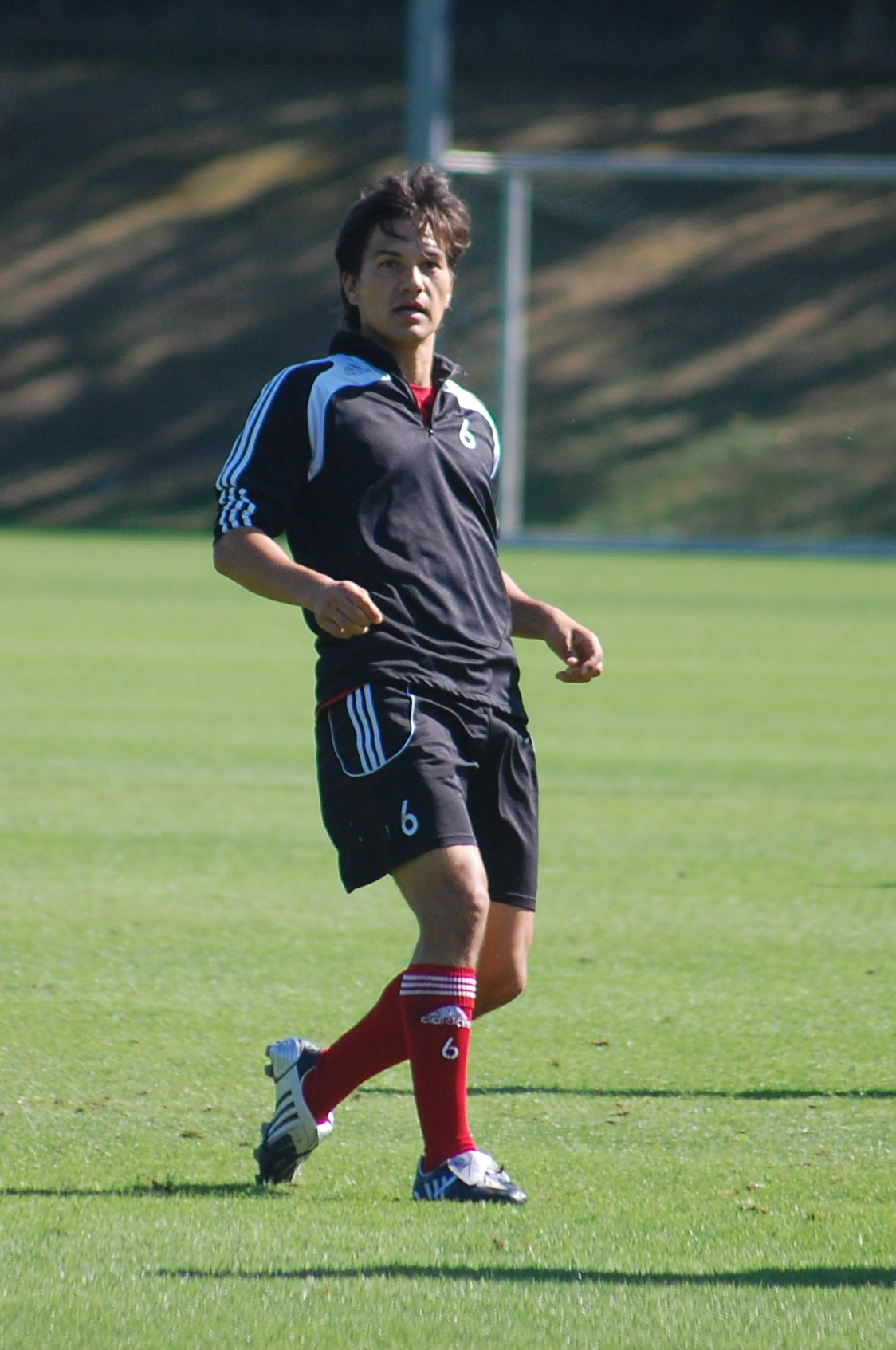
- by Matthias Hermann, 2009

Personal information
- Date of birth: 5 March 1982 (age 44)
- Place of birth: Cologne, West Germany
- Height: 1.80 m (5 ft 11 in)
- Position: Defensive midfielder

Youth career
- –1998: 1. FC Köln
- 1998–2001: Bayer Leverkusen

Senior career*
Years	Team	Apps	(Gls)
2001–2003	Bayer Leverkusen II	49	(6)
2003–2004	SG Wattenscheid 09	23	(0)
2004–2005	FSV Mainz 05 II	28	(4)
2005–2006	KFC Uerdingen	5	(0)
2006–2009	Wuppertaler SV Borussia	90	(5)
2009–2010	Holstein Kiel	29	(1)
2010–2011	SpVgg Unterhaching	18	(2)
2011–2014	Arminia Bielefeld	64	(6)
2014–2015	Alemannia Aachen	31	(5)
2015–2017	FC Viktoria Köln	21	(0)
- * Club domestic league appearances and goals

Tim Jerat (born 5 March 1982) is a German retired footballer. He is the son of the football coach Wolfgang Jerat.
