= 1994–95 Middlesbrough F.C. season =

Middlesbrough
1994–95 season
- Chairman: Steve Gibson
- Manager: Bryan Robson
- Stadium: Ayresome Park
- First Division: 1st (champions)
- FA Cup: Third round
- League Cup: Fourth round
- Top goalscorer: League: Hendrie (15); All: Hendrie (17)
- Highest home attendance: 23,903 (vs. Luton Town 30 April)
- Lowest home attendance: 14,878 (vs. WBA 14 September)
- Average home league attendance: 18,641

During the 1994–95 English football season, Middlesbrough F.C. competed in the Football League First Division.

== Season summary ==
Middlesbrough were promoted to the top flight of English football after a two-year exile by winning the Division One title under new player-manager Bryan Robson. A large part in the promotion push was played by a good loan signing in the form of Uwe Fuchs, scoring 9 goals in 13 league games. It was also Boro's last season at Ayresome Park after 92 years; they beat Luton Town 2–1 in their final game there on 30 April 1995 to seal the Division One title and the only automatic promotion place in the division that season. John Hendrie had the distinction of scoring the last goals at Ayresome Park, scoring both of Boro's goals in that game. After the season, Boro relocated to the new 30,000-seat Riverside Stadium on the banks of the River Tees.

== Final league table ==
Pos	Team	Pld	W	D	L	GF	GA	GD	Pts	Qualification or relegation
1	Middlesbrough (C, P)	46	23	13	10	67	40	+27	82	Promotion to the Premier League
2	Reading	46	23	10	13	58	44	+14	79	Qualification for the First Division play-offs
3	Bolton Wanderers (O, P)	46	21	14	11	67	45	+22	77	Qualification for the First Division play-offs
4	Wolverhampton Wanderers	46	21	13	12	77	61	+16	76	Qualification for the First Division play-offs
5	Tranmere Rovers	46	22	10	14	67	58	+9	76	Qualification for the First Division play-offs

Rules for classification: 1) Points; 2) Goals scored; 3) Goal difference
(C) Champions; (O) Play-off winners; (P) Promoted

== Results ==
Middlesbrough's score comes first

=== Legend ===
Win	Draw	Loss

=== Football League First Division ===
Date	Opponent	Venue	Result	Attendance	Scorers
13 August 1994	Burnley	H	2–0	23,343	Hendrie (2)
20 August 1994	Southend United	A	2–0	5,722	Hendrie (2)
27 August 1994	Bolton Wanderers	H	1–0	19,570	Wilkinson
31 August 1994	Derby County	A	1–0	14,659	Blackmore
3 September 1994	Watford	A	1–1	9,478	Blackmore
11 September 1994	Sunderland	H	2–2	19,578	Moore, Pearson
14 September 1994	West Brom	H	2–1	14,878	Mustoe, Hignett (pen)
17 September 1994	Port Vale	A	1–2	10,313	Pollock
25 September 1994	Bristol City	A	1–0	8,642	Hendrie
1 October 1994	Millwall	H	3–0	17,229	Hendrie, Wilkinson, Beard (og)
8 October 1994	Tranmere Rovers	H	0–1	18,497	
15 October 1994	Luton Town	A	1–5	8,412	Whyte
23 October 1994	Portsmouth	A	0–0	7,281	
29 October 1994	Swindon Town	H	3–1	17,328	Cox, Hendrie, Wilkinson (pen)
1 November 1994	Oldham Athletic	H	2–1	15,929	Moore, Hignett
5 November 1994	Grimsby Town	A	1–2	8,488	Hignett (pen)
20 November 1994	Wolverhampton Wanderers	H	1–0	19,953	Hendrie
26 November 1994	Charlton Athletic	A	2–0	10,019	Hendrie, Pollock
3 December 1994	Portsmouth	H	4–0	17,185	Wilkinson (2), Hignett (2)
6 December 1994	Reading	A	1–1	10,301	Wilkinson (pen)
10 December 1994	Southend United	H	1–2	16,843	Hendrie
18 December 1994	Burnley	A	3–0	12,049	Hendrie (3)
26 December 1994	Sheffield United	A	1–1	20,693	Hignett
28 December 1994	Notts County	H	2–1	21,558	Hignett, Pearson
31 December 1994	Stoke City	A	1–1	15,914	Vickers
15 January 1995	Swindon Town	A	1–2	8,888	Hignett
21 January 1995	Grimsby Town	H	1–1	15,360	Mustoe
4 February 1995	Reading	H	0–1	17,982	
18 February 1995	Charlton Athletic	H	1–0	16,301	Fuchs
21 February 1995	Wolverhampton Wanderers	A	2–0	27,611	Vickers, Fuchs
26 February 1995	Millwall	A	0–0	7,247	
4 March 1995	Bristol City	H	3–0	17,371	Fuchs (3)
7 March 1995	Watford	H	2–0	16,630	Mustoe, Fuchs
11 March 1995	Bolton Wanderers	A	0–1	18,370	
14 March 1995	Barnsley	H	1–1	19,655	Moreno
18 March 1995	Derby County	H	2–4	18,168	Fuchs, Pollock
21 March 1995	Sunderland	A	1–0	16,501	Pollock
26 March 1995	Port Vale	H	3–0	17,401	Fuchs, Robson, Vickers
1 April 1995	West Brom	A	3–1	20,256	Pollock, Raven (og), Moore
5 April 1995	Oldham Athletic	A	0–1	11,024	
7 April 1995	Stoke City	H	2–1	20,867	Pearson, Moore
15 April 1995	Notts County	A	1–1	9,677	Fuchs
17 April 1995	Sheffield United	H	1–1	23,225	Fjørtoft
22 April 1995	Barnsley	A	1–1	11,711	Fjørtoft
30 April 1995	Luton Town	H	2–1	23,903	Hendrie (2)
7 May 1995	Tranmere Rovers	A	1–1	16,377	Fjørtoft

=== FA Cup ===
Round	Date	Opponent	Venue	Result	Attendance	Goalscorers
R3	7 January 1995	Swansea City	A	1–1	8,407	Moore
R3R	17 January 1995	Swansea City	H	1–2	13,940	Hendrie

=== League Cup ===
Round	Date	Opponent	Venue	Result	Attendance	Goalscorers
R2 First Leg	20 September 1994	Scarborough	A	4–1	13,280	Hendrie, Pollock, Moore, Mustoe
R2 Second Leg	27 September 1994	Scarborough	H	4–1 (won 8–2 on agg)	7,739	Wilkinson (3), Hignett
R3	26 October 1994	Aston Villa	A	0–1	19,254	

=== Anglo Italian Cup ===
Round	Date	Opponent	Venue	Result	Attendance	Goalscorers
Group B	24 August 1994	Piacenza	H	0–0	5,348	
Group B	5 October 1994	Cesena	H	1–1	3,273	Moreno
Group B	18 October 1994	Udinese	A	0–0	300	
Group B	15 November 1994	Ancona	A	1–3	1,500	Morris

== Squad ==
Note: Flags indicate national team as defined under FIFA eligibility rules; some limited exceptions apply. Players may hold more than one non-FIFA nationality.

No.	Pos.	Nation	Player
—	GK	(England) ENG	Alan Miller
—	GK	(England) ENG	Stephen Pears
—	GK	(England) ENG	Andy Collett
—	GK	(England) ENG	Ben Roberts
—	DF	(England) ENG	Viv Anderson
—	DF	(England) ENG	Neil Cox
—	DF	(Republic of Ireland) IRL	Curtis Fleming
—	DF	(Republic of Ireland) IRL	Chris Morris
—	DF	(England) ENG	Nigel Pearson
—	DF	(England) ENG	Steve Vickers
—	DF	(Scotland) SCO	Derek Whyte
—	DF	(England) ENG	Craig Liddle
—	DF	(England) ENG	Michael Barron
—	DF	(England) ENG	Phil Whelan
—	DF	(England) ENG	Alan White
—	MF	(England) ENG	Clayton Blackmore

No.	Pos.	Nation	Player
—	MF	(England) ENG	Andy Todd
—	MF	(Republic of Ireland) IRL	Graham Kavanagh
—	MF	(Republic of Ireland) IRL	Alan Moore
—	MF	(Bolivia) BOL	Jaime Moreno
—	MF	(England) ENG	Robbie Mustoe
—	MF	(Republic of Ireland) IRL	Keith O'Halloran
—	MF	(England) ENG	Jamie Pollock
—	MF	(England) ENG	Bryan Robson (player-manager)
—	MF	(England) ENG	Phil Stamp
—	MF	(Scotland) SCO	Tommy Wright
—	MF	(England) ENG	Craig Hignett
—	FW	(Scotland) SCO	John Hendrie
—	FW	(Norway) NOR	Jan Åge Fjørtoft
—	FW	(England) ENG	Chris Freestone
—	FW	(Germany) GER	Uwe Fuchs (on loan from Fortuna Köln)
—	FW	(England) ENG	Paul Wilkinson

== Scorers ==
League goals only

- (Scotland) John Hendrie 15
- (Germany) Uwe Fuchs 9
- (England) Craig Hignett 8
- (England) Paul Wilkinson 6
- (England) Jamie Pollock 5
