= Yengibarov =

Yengibarov or Engibarov is an Armenian surname, variant of Yengibaryan modified to fit the Slavic-language formation of patronymic surnames.

- Engibar Engibarov, Bulgarian footballer
- Leonid Yengibarov, Soviet clown
