= Toshiaki Miyamoto =

Japanese footballer (born 1999)

Toshiaki Miyamoto 宮本 駿晃
Personal information
- Full name: Toshiaki Miyamoto
- Date of birth: June 4, 1999 (age 27)
- Place of birth: Chiba, Japan
- Height: 1.71 m (5 ft 7 in)
- Position: Left midfielder

Team information
- Current team: Kickers Emden
- Number: 3

Youth career
- Sanrizuka FC
- 2012–2017: Kashiwa Reysol

Senior career*
Years	Team	Apps	(Gls)
2017–2020	Kashiwa Reysol	4	(0)
2020	→ Montedio Yamagata (loan)	4	(0)
2021–2023	SV Straelen	59	(2)
2023–2025	Bremer SV	55	(0)
2025–2026	Wuppertaler SV	31	(0)
2026–	Kickers Emden	9	(1)
- * Club domestic league appearances and goals as of 22 September 2026

Toshiaki Miyamoto (宮本 駿晃, Miyamoto Toshiaki; born June 4, 1999) is a Japanese football player who plays for German club Kickers Emden.

== Career ==
Toshiaki Miyamoto joined J1 League club Kashiwa Reysol in 2017.

== Club statistics ==
Updated to end of 2018 season.

Club performance			League		Cup		League Cup		Continental		Total	
Season	Club	League	Apps	Goals	Apps	Goals	Apps	Goals	Apps	Goals	Apps	Goals
Japan			League		Emperor's Cup		J. League Cup		AFC		Total	
2017	Kashiwa Reysol	J1 League	0	0	0	0	1	1	-		1	1
2018	Kashiwa Reysol	J1 League	0	0	1	0	2	0	1	0	4	0
Total			0	0	1	0	3	1	1	0	5	1
