= Litjens =

Litjens is a Dutch patronymic surname most common in northern Limburg. Notable people with the surname include:

- Joey Litjens (born 1990), Dutch motorcyclist
- Michelle Litjens (born 1972), American politician
- Paul Litjens (1947–2023), Dutch field hockey player
- Pieter Litjens (born 1968), Dutch politician
- Stefan Litjens (1913–2002), German World War II pilot awarded the Knight's Cross of the Iron Cross
- Thomas Litjens (born 1984), Dutch footballer
