= Yengibaryan =

Yengibaryan or Engibaryan is an Armenian patronymic surname literally meaning "son of Yengibar". Notable people with the surname include:

- Amik Yengibaryan (1901–1948), Soviet aviation designer
- Gurgen Engibaryan, Lebanese footballer of Armenian descent
- Vladimir Yengibaryan (1932–2013), Soviet boxer

== See also ==
- Yengibarov
