= Thomas Richter (footballer, born 1962) =

German footballer and manager

Personal information
- Date of birth: 27 February 1962 (age 64)
- Place of birth: Castrop-Rauxel, West Germany
- Height: 1.78 m (5 ft 10 in)
- Position: Goalkeeper

Senior career*
Years	Team	Apps	(Gls)
1980–1981	Holstein Kiel	24	(0)
1986–1988	SSV Ulm 1846	71	(0)
1988–1989	Viktoria Aschaffenburg	6	(0)
1992–1994	Wuppertaler SV	6	(0)
1996–1997	VfB Lübeck	1	(0)

Managerial career
- 2004–2005: Wuppertaler SV
- 2007–2009: Kickers Emden (assistant)
- 2009: Kickers Emden (caretaker)
- 2010–2011: Wuppertaler SV (assistant)
- * Club domestic league appearances and goals

Thomas Richter (born 27 February 1962) is a German football coach and former player.
