= Uwe Fuchs =

German football coach and former player (born 1966)

Personal information
- Date of birth: 23 July 1966 (age 60)
- Place of birth: Kaiserslautern, West Germany
- Height: 1.87 m (6 ft 2 in)
- Position: Centre forward

Senior career*
Years	Team	Apps	(Gls)
1984–1986	FC Homburg	56	(7)
1987	Stuttgarter Kickers	10	(2)
1987–1989	Fortuna Köln	66	(36)
1989–1990	Fortuna Düsseldorf	25	(7)
1990–1993	1. FC Köln	19	(4)
1993–1994	1. FC Kaiserslautern	19	(3)
1994	Fortuna Köln	16	(2)
1995	→ Middlesbrough (loan)	13	(9)
1995–1996	Millwall	36	(5)
1996–1998	Arminia Bielefeld	25	(4)
Total		271	(87)

International career
	West Germany U-21	1	(0)

Managerial career
- 2001: Fortuna Düsseldorf
- 2001: Fortuna Köln
- 2001–2002: Rot Weiss Ahlen (assistant)
- 2002: Rot Weiss Ahlen (interim)
- 2005–2007: Wuppertaler SV
- 2007–2008: VfB Lübeck
- 2008–2010: Wuppertaler SV
- 2011–2012: VfL Osnabrück
- * Club domestic league appearances and goals

Uwe Fuchs (born 23 July 1966) is a German football coach and former player.

== Playing career ==
Fuchs was born in Kaiserslautern.

He was loaned to Middlesbrough towards the end of the 1994–95 season, playing just 15 games, but was instrumental in helping the club win promotion to the Premier League, scoring nine league goals. Fuchs went on to become a cult figure at Middlesbrough; but he was not kept at the club by manager Bryan Robson for the following season.

== Managerial career ==
In January 2005, he took over the helm at the Wuppertaler SV (Regional Northern League). On 23 December 2008, he re-joined Wuppertaler SV, but was released on 2 April 2010.

On 31 May 2011, he replaced Heiko Flottmann as manager of VfL Osnabrück.

== Personal life ==
His father Fritz Fuchs is also a coach and a former player. His uncle Werner Fuchs was also a coach.

== Honours ==
Stuttgarter Kickers

- DFB-Pokal runner-up: 1986–87

1. FC Köln

- DFB-Pokal runner-up: 1990–91

Middlesbrough

- Football League First Division: 1994–95
