= Marmagen =

- Village of Nettersheim
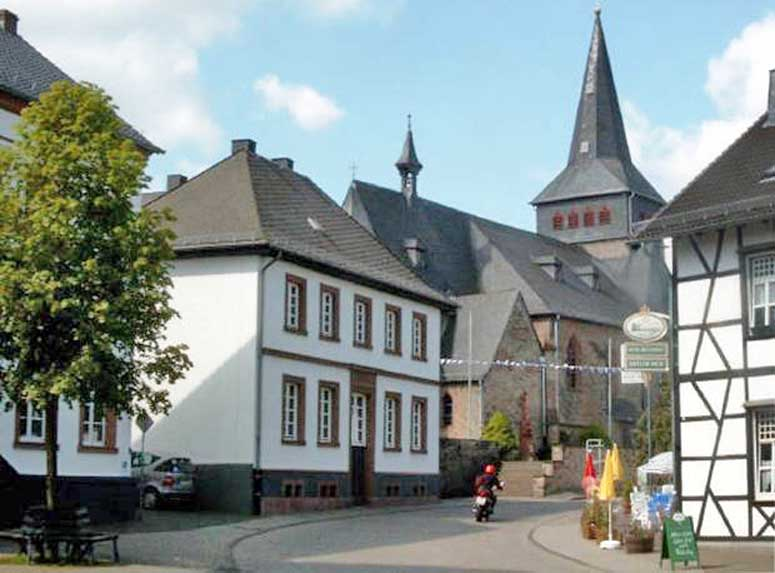
- Marmagen – former Kirchgasse from the east

- Coat of arms

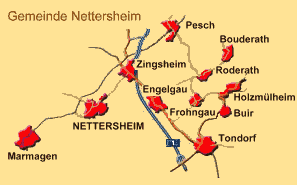
- Location of Marmagen
- Interactive map of Marmagen
- Location within Germany Location within North Rhine-Westphalia
- Coordinates: 50°28′37″N 6°34′47″E
- Country: Germany
- State: North Rhine-Westphalia
- Municipality: Nettersheim

Area
  - Total: 17.62 km^{2} (6.80 sq mi)
- Elevation: 540–600 m (1,770–1,970 ft)

Population (2020-12-31)
  - Total: 1,636
  - Density: 92.85/km^{2} (240.5/sq mi)
- Time zone: UTC+01:00 (CET)
  - Summer (DST): UTC+02:00 (CEST)
- Postal codes: 53947
- Dialling codes: 02486

Marmagen is a German tradesmen's village in the Eifel with a population of about 1,600. The formerly independent parish has been part of the municipality of Nettersheim in the district of Euskirchen since 1969. Marmagen is the oldest village in the former district of Schleiden and goes back to the Roman vicus of Marcomagus on the Roman road from Trier to Cologne which is recorded in Roman itineraries of the 2nd to 4th centuries. After a 700-year history as an abbey village owned by the nearby Premonstratensian Abbey of Steinfeld since the early 1900s Marmagen has developed a distinct culture of trades in the building sector. Today Marmagen sees itself as a 'nature experience village' and is the site of the well known clinic, Eifelhöhenklinik AG Marmagen.

== Literature ==
- Friedrich Milz: Eifeler Dorfgeschichten. Erlebtes und Gehörtes in Marmagen. Düren o. J.
- Gemeinde Nettersheim (publ.): So war’s in Nettersheim. Nettersheim 1983 (collection of historical photographs inter alia from Marmagen).
- Erich Froitzheim: Marmagen. In: Kleine Kunstführer No. 1478. Munich, 1984 (Geschichtlicher Abriss des Ortes und der Pfarrkirche).
- Felix Bretz: Marmagen 2000 – Eine Chronik mit Bildern zur Dorfgeschichte. Kall, 2000.
