= Ostfriesland-Stadion =

Football stadium in Emden, Germany

Coordinates: 53°22′45″N 7°12′12″E

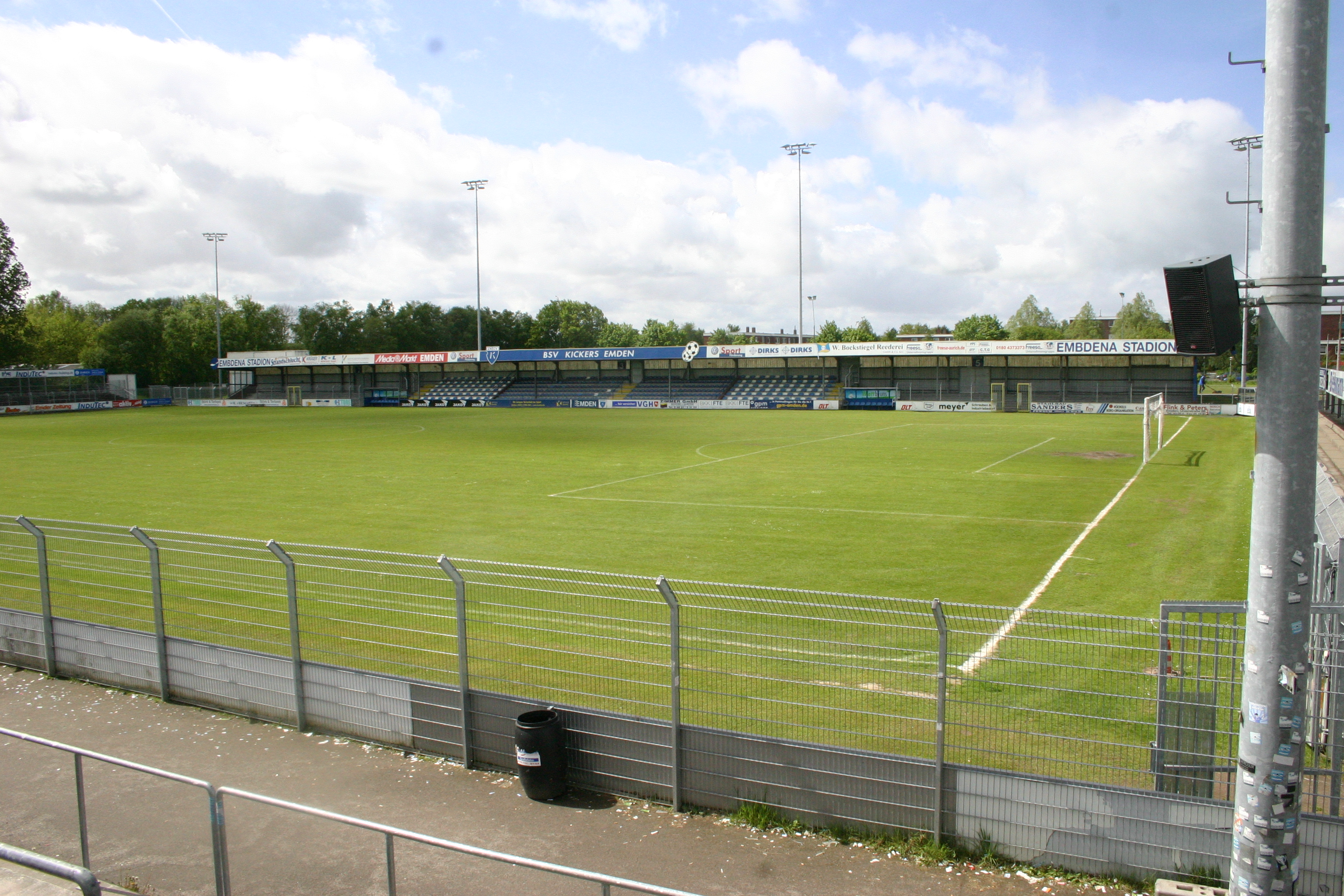

Ostfriesland-Stadion is a multi-use stadium in Emden, Germany. It is used exclusively for football matches and has been the home stadium of Kickers Emden since 1950.

== History ==
The current name of the stadium was adopted in 2005 and comes from a local real estate and financial services firm under a sponsorship agreement. Between 1998 and 2005, the venue was named after a former president of the club, Dr. Helmut Riedl, and prior to those years it was simply known as Kickers-Stadion.

The stadium is able to hold 12,000 people, which was the largest crowd during a third-division match between Kickers Emden and Hamburger SV's reserve squad on the final day of the 1993–94 season. However, for security reasons, its current capacity for competitive matches is limited to 7,200. From the 2007–08 season onwards, competitive matches can again be played in evening hours, using floodlighting. This had been forbidden in the previous two Regionalliga seasons because the floodlights were only able to produce 300 lux of light; at least 400 is required for clear television pictures. Thus, new floodlights were installed.

In the last season in the 4th League (2004–05), the average attendance was around 1,800. It has since increased to about 3,600, as of March 2008.

== Stands ==
The stadium is almost all-standing as there are only 400 seats on the main stand. About 3,200 standing places on the West Stand (Main Stand) as well as all seats there are roofed over. This stand hosts the teams, managers and other officials during the matches.

The stand on the opposite side (East Stand) hosts a small tower that is used by the announcer. The stand is known among the supporters as Prinz-Heinrich-Tribüne (Prinz Heinrich stand), which describes the average age of the fans standing there, many of them wearing a sailor's hat known in North Germany as Prinz-Heinrich-Mütze.

The North Stand, also known as Bushaltestelle (bus stop) due to its little height, hosts part of the home supporters, the others stand "just around the corner" on the Main Stand.

The South Stand is left for away supporters and capable of holding up to 2000 spectators – a figure which only a few times has been reached by away fans since Kickers' promotion to the 3rd league in 2005. An electronic scoreboard is situated behind this stand.
