= Fritz Fuchs =

German former football coach and player (born 1943)

Personal information
- Date of birth: 18 October 1943 (age 83)
- Place of birth: Kaiserslautern, Third Reich
- Position: Defender

Senior career*
Years	Team	Apps	(Gls)
1963–1969	SV Alsenborn		
1969–1975	1. FC Kaiserslautern	168	(12)
1975–1978	BFV Hassia Bingen		

Managerial career
- 1975–1978: BFV Hassia Bingen
- 1978–1979: VfR Bürstadt
- 1980: BFV Hassia Bingen
- 1980–1981: FSV Salmrohr
- 1981–1983: BFV Hassia Bingen
- 1983–1984: SC Freiburg
- 1984: Kickers Offenbach
- 1984–1985: SSV Ulm
- 1985–1986: FC 08 Homburg
- 1986–1987: Arminia Bielefeld
- 1989: SC Freiburg
- 1993–1994: 1. FC Saarbrücken
- 1998–1999: Union Berlin
- 1999: Rot-Weiss Essen
- 2003–2005: FK Pirmasens
- 2005: 1. FC Saarbrücken II
- 2005: 1. FC Saarbrücken (caretaker)
- 2005–2006: 1. FC Saarbrücken II
- 2006–2008: 1. FC Saarbrücken (youth team athletic director)
- 2008: 1. FC Kaiserslautern (athletic director)
- * Club domestic league appearances and goals

Fritz Fuchs (born 18 October 1943, in Kaiserslautern) is a German former football coach and player. As a player, he spent six seasons in the Bundesliga with 1. FC Kaiserslautern. As a coach, his biggest success was managing FC 08 Homburg to their promotion to the Bundesliga.

His son Uwe Fuchs is a coach as well. His brother Werner Fuchs was also a football coach.

== Honours as a player ==
- DFB-Pokal finalist: 1971–72
