= Thomas Litjens =

Association footballer (born 1984)

Personal information
- Full name: Thomas Nishan Litjens
- Date of birth: August 22, 1984 (age 42)
- Place of birth: Dehiwala, Sri Lanka
- Height: 1.86 m (6 ft 1 in)
- Position: Centre-back

Youth career
- Roda JC

Senior career*
Years	Team	Apps	(Gls)
2004–2005	Jong Roda JC	19	(1)
2005–2006	Falkirk	2	(0)
2006–2009	Wuppertaler SV Borussia	16	(0)
2006–2007	Wuppertaler SV II	6	(0)
2007–2008	→ Kickers Emden (loan)	4	(0)
2008–2009	SSVg Velbert	14	(0)
2010	Baronie	7	(2)
2010–2012	CSV Apeldoorn		
2012–2013	Babberich		
2013–2014	EHC Hoensbroek		
2014–2015	Germania Teveren		
2015–2016	SG Gangelt-Hastenrath		
- * Club domestic league appearances and goals

Thomas Nishan Litjens (born 22 August 1984) is a Dutch former professional footballer who played as a centre-back.

== After football ==
Litjens opened a barber shop in Roermond after retiring from football.
