= Karsten Hutwelker =

German footballer (born 1971)

Personal information
- Date of birth: 27 August 1971 (age 55)
- Place of birth: Wuppertal, West Germany
- Height: 1.86 m (6 ft 1 in)
- Position: Left-back

Senior career*
| Years | Team | Apps | (Gls) |
| 1990–1993 | Fortuna Düsseldorf | 74 | (7) |
| 1993–1994 | SG Wattenscheid | 5 | (0) |
| 1994–1995 | Wuppertaler SV | 29 | (11) |
| 1995–1996 | Carl Zeiss Jena | 22 | (8) |
| 1996–1998 | VfL Bochum | 25 | (4) |
| 1998–1999 | 1. FC Köln | 24 | (1) |
| 1999–2001 | 1. FC Saarbrücken | 67 | (19) |
| 2001–2002 | LR Ahlen | 12 | (2) |
| 2002 | 1. FC Saarbrücken | 14 | (5) |
| 2002–2003 | Florentia Viola | 10 | (0) |
| 2003 | Eintracht Braunschweig | 15 | (2) |
| 2003–2004 | Jahn Regensburg | 27 | (6) |
| 2004–2007 | FC Augsburg | 66 | (8) |
| 2007–2008 | SCR Altach | 38 | (2) |
| Total | | 428 | (75) |

International career
| 1992 | Germany U-21 | 1 | (0) |

Managerial career
- 2009–2010: VfB Süsterfeld (player-manager)
- 2010: Bonner SC (U19)
- 2011: SG Wattenscheid 09 (U19)
- 2011: Wuppertaler SV
- 2013–2014: FC Kray
- 2014: Carl Zeiss Jena II
- 2014: Carl Zeiss Jena (caretaker)
- 2015–2016: TuS Celle
- 2016–2017: SSVg Velbert
- 2018–2019: Oberlausitz Neugersdorf
- 2019: Wuppertaler SV (caretaker)
- * Club domestic league appearances and goals

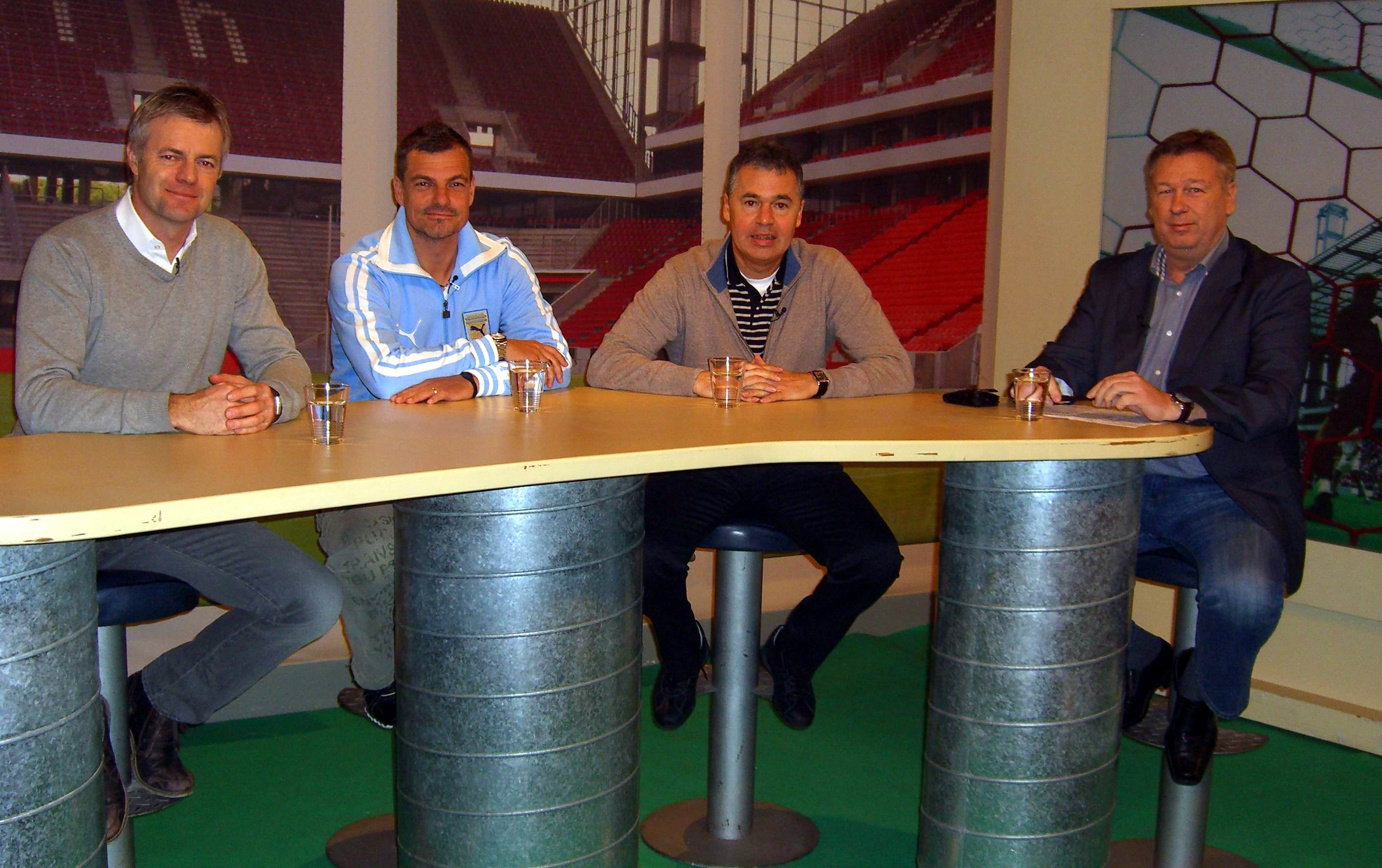
Karsten Hutwelker participating in a panel discussion during HEIMSPIEL-Talk with Tom Bartels, Andreas Rettig, and Ralf Friedrichs

Karsten Hutwelker (born 27 August 1971) is a German former professional footballer who played as a left-back. He last managed Wuppertaler SV.

== Coaching career ==
=== Bonner SC ===
After a season as player-manager at VfB Süsterfeld, Hutwelker started his coaching career started at Bonner SC. The club had previously relegated from the Regionalliga West due to financial problems. Hutwelker's predecessor was Wolfgang Jerat. The strained financial situation of the club meant that bankruptcy proceedings had to be opened in July 2010. The first team was thus also excluded from the NRW league and did not take part in any game operations in 2010–11. Hutwelker nevertheless agreed to help the club and became the new coach of the U-19, which, despite the bankruptcy proceedings, took part in the games of their league. There he initially worked without being paid and wanted to lay a foundation stone for the development of the club in the future and to build a framework of young players for future men's teams. He was in charge for 12 games before leaving at the end of the year due to the still poor perspective.

=== Wattenscheid & Wuppertaler SV ===
He then took charge of SG Wattenscheid 09's U19s i March 2011 until the summer, where he was appointed manager of Wuppertaler SV. However, it only lasted for 14 weeks. On 19 September 2011, the club announced that it had to part with Hutwelker due to the sporting situation.

=== FC Kray ===
Hutwelker finished his coaching license and was appointed manager of FC Kray on 4 November 2013. Just five months later, on 19 March 2014, he withdrew his exit clause from the contract that ran until summer 2015 and announced that he would leave the club in summer 2014.

=== Carl Zeiss Jena ===
Hutwelker became assistant coach of the Belgian Patrick van Kets at FC Carl Zeiss Jena in the summer of 2014, and he also took over as head coach of the second team of the club in the NOFV-Oberliga. On 25 August 2014 Hutwelker was appointed caretaker manager of the first team after Lothar Kurbjuweit was fired. On 10 December 2014, he was released from his position as interim head coach, but he had a contract until 2016, so he continued at the club, working in the youth sector. In March 2015, the club announced that it had converted Hutwelker's contract into a contract as a scout.

=== TuS Celle ===
On 15 December 2015, Hutwelker was appointed manager of TuS Celle FC. On 24 February 2014, it was reported that he had left the club to accept an offer from a foreign club that wanted to hire him as their technical director.

=== SSVg Velbert ===
Ahead of the 2016–17 season, Hutwelker was appointed manager of SSVg Velbert. In January 2017 it was confirmed, that Hutwelker had decided to step down from his position for personal reasons, but would continue in the scouting area until the summer where his contract expired.

=== Oberlausitz Neugersdorf ===
In the summer 2018 he was introduced as the manager of FC Oberlausitz Neugersdorf in the Regionalliga Nordost. He was released in mid-February 2019.

=== Wuppertaler SV ===
In March 2019, Hutwelker returned to his hometown of Wuppertal and became sports director of the regional league team Wuppertaler SV. From 2 October until 17 October, he took charge of the club's first team on an interim basis.

On 16 January 2020, Hutwelker was released from his position as sporting director.
