= Wolfgang Jerat =

German footballer (1955–2020)

Personal information
- Date of birth: 9 February 1955
- Place of birth: Cologne, West Germany
- Date of death: 10 July 2020 (aged 65)
- Place of death: Ghana
- Position: Defender

Senior career*
Years	Team	Apps	(Gls)
–1986	Bergisch Gladbach		

Managerial career
- 1990–1992: Wuppertaler SV
- 1993: 1. FC Köln
- 1993–1995: 1. FC Köln (assistant)
- 1996–1997: Wuppertaler SV
- 2006–2007: FC Junkersdorf
- 2007–2008: Wuppertaler SV Borussia
- 2008–2010: Bonner SC
- 2011–2012: FC Prishtina
- 2012−2013: Viktoria Köln
- 2014−2015: Baník Most 1909
- * Club domestic league appearances and goals

Wolfgang Jerat (9 February 1955 – 10 July 2020) was a German footballer who became a coach. His son Tim Jerat is a professional footballer.

Jerat was born in Cologne and died in Ghana on 10 July 2020.
