= Werner Fuchs =

German footballer and manager

Personal information
- Date of birth: 25 October 1948
- Place of birth: Kaiserslautern, Germany
- Date of death: 11 May 1999 (aged 50)
- Place of death: Aachen, Germany
- Position: Centre forward

Senior career*
Years	Team	Apps	(Gls)
1967–1968	1. FC Kaiserslautern	1	(0)
1968–1972	SV Alsenborn		
1972	Hannover 96	0	(0)
1972–1980	Preußen Münster	193	(20)

Managerial career
- 1984–1987: Alemannia Aachen
- 1987–1988: 1. FC Saarbrücken
- 1988–1990: Hertha BSC
- 1991–1992: Eintracht Braunschweig
- 1993: VfB Oldenburg
- 1994–1996: Wuppertaler SV
- 1996–1999: Alemannia Aachen
- * Club domestic league appearances and goals

Werner Fuchs (25 October 1948 – 11 May 1999) was a German football player and coach.

== Playing career ==
Fuchs was born in Kaiserslautern. A centre forward, he began his professional career in 1967 with a professional contract at 1. FC Kaiserslautern, where his older brother Fritz also played professionally. Werner Fuchs only appeared once in the first team against Eintracht Braunschweig on 10 February 1968, and would remain his only appearance in the Bundesliga. Although he did feature in another Bundesliga team, Hannover 96 in 1972, he transferred to the regional league team SC Preußen Münster in that same season without making an appearance. He played on in Münster until his retirement in 1980.

== Coaching career ==
His greatest achievements came as a football manager. As trainer of Alemannia Aachen, he enjoyed huge popularity among the citizens of Aachen. He was trainer there from 1984 to 1987, and then again from 1996 until his death in 1999. He took Alemannia Aachen back into the 2. Bundesliga, but was unable to continue his success as a few days before the final league game, which Aachen won to secure promotion, he collapsed during a walk in the woods with the team and died of a heart attack aged 50. He continues to be honoured by Aachen fans today, with signs in the stadium, for example.

== Tributes ==
On the tenth anniversary of Werner Fuchs' death, Alemannia Aachen announced that the new amateur stadium belonging to the also New Tivoli stadium would be named the "Werner-Fuchs-Stadion", following suggestions from fans. In honor of Werner Fuchs, the club renamed “The South Stand” to “Werner-Fuchs-Tribüne” in July 2021.
