= Michael Molata =

German footballer (born 1973)

Personal information
- Date of birth: 10 February 1973 (age 53)
- Place of birth: Bad Langensalza, East Germany
- Height: 1.90 m (6 ft 3 in)
- Position: Defender

Youth career
- 1989–1991: Carl Zeiss Jena

Senior career*
Years	Team	Apps	(Gls)
1991–1995	Carl Zeiss Jena	81	(12)
1995–1997	Arminia Bielefeld	42	(5)
1997–1998	Hamburger SV	13	(0)
1998–2000	Karlsruher SC	56	(2)
2000–2001	Hannover 96	24	(2)
2002	Babelsberg 03	10	(2)
2002–2004	Union Berlin	51	(1)
2004–2007	Holstein Kiel	74	(13)
Total		351	(37)
- * Club domestic league appearances and goals

Michael Molata (born 10 February 1973) is a German former professional footballer who played as a defender. He played in the Bundesliga with Arminia Bielefeld and Hamburger SV and in the UEFA Intertoto Cup with Hamburger SV.

== Career ==
Born in Bad Langensalza, Molata played youth football for Carl Zeiss Jena before starting his career there, making his debut in the 1991–92 season whilst Carl Zeiss Jena were in the 2. Bundesliga. With Carl Zeiss Jena now in the Regionalliga, Molata joined 2. Bundesliga side Arminia Bielefeld in 1995 before getting promoted to the Bundesliga in the 1995–96 season. Having made 11 appearances in the Bundesliga with Arminia Bielefeld across the 1996–97 season, scoring twice, he joined Hamburger SV in the summer of 1997 and made 13 appearances for Hamburg in the Bundesliga during the 1997–98 season and one in the UEFA Intertoto Cup, though he did not score. Having left Hamburg in the summer of 1998, he went on to play for Karlsruher SC, Hannover 96, Babelsberg 03 and Union Berlin in the 2. Bundesliga and Holstein Kiel in the Regionalliga.
