= Andreas Zeyer =

German footballer

Personal information
- Date of birth: 9 June 1968 (age 58)
- Place of birth: Neresheim, West Germany
- Height: 1.79 m (5 ft 10 in)
- Position: Midfielder

Senior career*
Years	Team	Apps	(Gls)
1987–1989	SSV Ulm	20	(1)
1989–1997	SC Freiburg	253	(29)
1997–1998	Hamburger SV	29	(1)
1998	Karlsruher SC	12	(0)
1999	VfL Bochum	11	(3)
1999–2004	SC Freiburg	149	(14)
Total		474	(48)
- * Club domestic league appearances and goals

Andreas Zeyer (born 9 June 1968) is a German former professional footballer who played as a midfielder. He is the twin brother of Michael Zeyer.

== Honours ==
- Bundesliga third place: 1995
