= Kickers Emden =

German association football club from Emden, Lower Saxony

- Full name: Barenburger Sportverein Kickers Emden e.V.
- Founded: 24 March 1946
- Ground: Ostfriesland-Stadion
- Capacity: 7,200
- Chairman: Dr. Jörg Winter
- Manager: Björn Lindemann
- League: Regionalliga Nord (IV)
- 2025–26: Regionalliga Nord, 8th of 18
- Website: http://www.bsv-kickers-emden.de/
Home colours	Away colours

BSV Kickers Emden is a German association football club, located in Emden, Lower Saxony.

== History ==
The club first began playing in 1928 as a section of the gymnastics club Emder Turnverein, which was founded in 1861. An independent football club was formed on 24 March 1946 out of the membership of this predecessor side and several other local associations which had been dissolved after World War II.

In 1949, the club was promoted to the Amateuroberliga Niedersachsen-West, a second-division league at the time. They went on to finish first in the league at the end of the 1950–51 season and advanced therewith to the promotion play-offs for at the time first-division Oberliga Nord, but did not manage to get promoted. They were only a mediocre team in the Amateuroberliga Niedersachsen-West in the remainder of the decade and eventually slipped down to the fourth-division Verbandsliga Niedersachen-Nord in 1964. They returned to the third-division Amateurliga Niedersachsen in 1970, but were relegated back to the fourth division after three seasons.

Between 1975 and 1983, the club competed below fourth division. They managed to return to the fourth division for the 1983–84 season, but were relegated back to the fifth division after three seasons. Another return to the fourth division followed in 1988 and the club was eventually promoted to the third-division Amateuroberliga Nord after finishing first in the 1990–91 season of the fourth-division Verbandsliga Niedersachsen.

They participated in the DFB-Pokal for the first time in the 1992–93 season, but were eliminated in the first round by then Bundesliga side 1. FC Saarbrücken, who easily beat them 5–1. The club also won berths in the German Cup after winning the Cup of Lower Saxony in 1996 and 2000. However, both of these two appearances in the German Cup ended in the first round as well. In the 1996–97 season, they lost 3–1 to then Bundesliga side Fortuna Düsseldorf and in the 2000–01 season they suffered a minimal 1–0 defeat to 1. FSV Mainz 05, a 2. Bundesliga side at the time.

A first-place finish in the third-division Amateuroberliga Nord in the 1993–94 season, after which the club failed to ascend to the 2. Bundesliga in a post-season tournament, would have to be considered the recent high point. The club continued to compete in then newly founded third-division Regionalliga Nord and never finished below 9th place in the following four seasons, but a 15th-place finish in the 1998–99 season of the league dropped them back to the fourth division after eight seasons in the third division. The club subsequently competed in the fourth-division Oberliga Niedersachsen/Bremen for five seasons and narrowly missed return to the Regionalliga Nord in 2000 and 2003, when they advanced to the promotion play-offs in which they lost to Lüneburger SK and VfR Neumünster respectively. In the 2004–05 season, the club finished first in then newly founded fourth-division Oberliga Nord and returned to the third-division Regionalliga Nord for the 2005–06 season. In their first season since returning to the third division, Kickers Emden managed a ninth-place finish in the Regionalliga Nord. After a successful 2008–09 season in the 3. Liga, finishing sixth, the club decided to withdraw from the league for financial reasons. Instead of the tier-four Regionalliga Nord, the club decided to enter the tier-five Oberliga Niedersachsen-West for 2009–10, also for financial reasons. In 2012, Kickers were sent down to Landesliga after insolvency, annulling games they played in Oberliga and downgrading their remaining fixtures into friendlies.

== Other departments ==
Kickers Emden has other departments for table tennis and gorodki.

== Notable coaches ==
- Jürgen Bogs, former trainer of BFC Dynamo. One of the most successful trainer in DDR with a total of 10 major titles in a row (1979–1988).
- Stefan Emmerling, former player in the Bundesliga
- Marc Fascher, led Kickers Emden into the third division (Regionalliga)
- Michael Krüger
- Thomas Richter
- Gerd Roggensack

== Recent seasons ==
Recent seasons of the club:

Year	Division	Position
1999–2000	Oberliga Niedersachsen/Bremen (IV)	1st (no promotion due to league system changes)
2000–01	Oberliga Niedersachsen/Bremen	2nd
2001–02	Oberliga Niedersachsen/Bremen	8th
2002–03	Oberliga Niedersachsen/Bremen	6th
2003–04	Oberliga Niedersachsen/Bremen	1st (lost promotion playoff)
2004–05	Oberliga Nord (IV)	1st (promoted)
2005–06	Regionalliga Nord (III)	9th
2006–07	Regionalliga Nord	4th
2007–08	Regionalliga Nord	9th
2008–09	3. Liga (III)	6th (withdrew)
2009–10	Oberliga Niedersachsen-West (V)	5th
2010–11	Oberliga Niedersachsen (V)	4th
2011–12	Oberliga Niedersachsen	18th (demoted after insolvency)
2012–13	Landesliga Weser-Ems (VI)	8th
2013–14	Landesliga Weser-Ems	10th
2014–15	Landesliga Weser-Ems	3rd
2015–16	Landesliga Weser-Ems	4th
2016–17	Landesliga Weser-Ems	5th
2017–18	Landesliga Weser-Ems	2nd
2018–19	Landesliga Weser-Ems	2nd (promoted)
2019–20	Oberliga Niedersachsen	8th
2020–21	Oberliga Niedersachsen Weser-Ems	4th
2021–22	Oberliga Niedersachsen	2nd
2022–23	Regionalliga Nord	19th
2023–24	Oberliga Niedersachsen	1st
2024–25	Regionalliga Nord	2nd
2025–26	Regionalliga Nord	8th

== Honours ==
The club's honours:

- Oberliga Nord
  - Champions: 1994, 2005
- Oberliga Niedersachsen/Bremen
  - Champions: 2000, 2003
- Verbandsliga Niedersachsen
  - Champions: 1989, 1991

== Players ==
As of 8 September, 2026

Note: Flags indicate national team as defined under FIFA eligibility rules; some limited exceptions apply. Players may hold more than one non-FIFA nationality.

No.	Pos.	Nation	Player
1	GK	GER	Luca Petzold
3	DF	JPN	Toshiaki Miyamoto
4	DF	GER	Fabian Herbst
5	MF	GER	Peer Mahncke
6	MF	GER	Moritz Busch
7	MF	GER	Ayukayoh Mengot
8	MF	UKR	Bohdan Shubin
9	FW	GER	Theo Schröder
10	FW	GER	Semin Kojic
11	MF	GER	Matti Tjaden
14	FW	GER	Luc Ihorst

No.	Pos.	Nation	Player
15	DF	GER	Bent Andresen
17	DF	GER	Sandro Plechaty
18	MF	GER	Michael Igwe
19	FW	GER	Marvin Benjamins
23	MF	GER	Jannes Warnken
24	GK	GER	Isaak Djokovic
29	DF	GER	Jubes Ticha
34	DF	GER	Ole Kühling
39	MF	GER	Nick Stepantsev
44	DF	GER	Jamil Najjar
57	DF	GER	Ibrahim Touray (on loan from VfL Osnabrück)

== Staff ==
Head Coach

- Björn Lindemann

Assistant Coaches

- Sascha Richarz (Assistant coach)
- Yasin Turan (Assistant coach)
- Gerwin Schmidt (Goalkeeper coach)

Management

- Carsten Herzog (Sporting management)
- Arno Janssen (Team manager)

Physiotherapist

- Hendrik Peters
