= Emir Dzafič =

Slovenian footballer

Personal information
- Full name: Emir Dzafič
- Date of birth: 8 September 1972 (age 54)
- Place of birth: SFR Yugoslavia
- Height: 1.77 m (5 ft 10 in)
- Position: Midfielder

Senior career*
Years	Team	Apps	(Gls)
1991–1992	Celje	51	(13)
1993–1994	Beltinci	44	(11)
1994	Rudar Velenje	13	(3)
1995	Mura	5	(0)
1995–1997	Beltinci	76	(18)
1998–1999	VfL Bochum	6	(1)
1999	Samobor		
2000–2001	Beltinci	8	(1)
2001–2004	Malacca FA		
2004–2005	Mura	4	(0)
- * Club domestic league appearances and goals

Emir Dzafič (born 8 September 1972) is a Slovenian former professional footballer who played as a midfielder.
