= Maik Kischko =

German footballer

Personal information
- Full name: Maik Kischko
- Date of birth: 7 July 1966 (age 60)
- Place of birth: Löberitz, East Germany
- Height: 1.93 m (6 ft 4 in)
- Position: Goalkeeper

Team information
- Current team: 1. FC Lokomotive Leipzig (Goalkeeping coach)

Senior career*
Years	Team	Apps	(Gls)
1984–1991	1. FC Lokomotive Leipzig	6	(0)
1991–1997	VfB Leipzig	164	(0)
1997–1998	Carl Zeiss Jena	22	(0)
1998–1999	VfL Bochum	2	(0)
1999–2000	Stuttgarter Kickers	4	(0)
2000–2001	Erzgebirge Aue	20	(0)
2001–2004	FC Eilenburg		

Managerial career
- 2008–2015: 1. FC Lokomotive Leipzig (Goalkeeping coach)
- 2017–: 1. FC Lokomotive Leipzig (Goalkeeping coach)
- * Club domestic league appearances and goals

Maik Kischko (born 7 July 1966) is a German former professional footballer who played as a goalkeeper. He works as a goalkeeping coach for his former club 1. FC Lokomotive Leipzig.
