= Wuppertaler SV =

German association football club from Wuppertal, North Rhine-Westphalia

- Full name: Wuppertaler Sport-Verein e.V.
- Nicknames: WSV, Die Löwen (The Lions)
- Founded: 1880 as Gymnastic Club; 1904 as Football Club
- Ground: Stadion am Zoo
- Capacity: 23,067
- Chairman: Alexander Eichner
- Manager: Sebastian Tyrała
- League: Oberliga Niederrhein (V)
- 2025–26: Regionalliga West, 16th of 18 (relegated)
Home colours	Away colours

Wuppertaler SV is a German association football club located in Wuppertal, North Rhine-Westphalia. The city was founded in 1929 by the union of a number of smaller towns including Elberfeld, Barmen, Vohwinkel, Cronenberg, and Ronsdorf – each with its own football club. Wuppertaler Sport Verein was formed on 8 July 1954 out of the merger of TSG Vohwinkel and SSV Wuppertal and was later joined by Borussia Wuppertal to form the present day club. In addition to the football side, today's sports club includes departments for boxing, gymnastics, handball, and track and field.

== History ==
=== Early history of predecessors TSG and SSV ===
TSG was active as a gymnastics club as early as 1880 while the roots of SSV go back to the 1904 establishment of the winter sports club Bergischer Wintersport-und SV 04 Elberfeld, which was known simply as SSV Elberfeld by 1905. This club took part in the early rounds of the national finals in 1930–31 and went on to play in the Gauliga Niederrhein, one of sixteen top-flight divisions formed in the 1933 re-organization of German football under the Third Reich, for two seasons in 1936–37 and 1937–38. The side was re-christened SSV 04 Wuppertal the following year and remained in the Gauliga another two seasons until relegated in 1940. They returned to first tier football in 1941 and earned a strong third-place finish, but left the division part way through the 1942–43 season because they were unable to continue to field a full side as a result of wartime manpower shortages.

=== Post war play and the formation of WSV ===
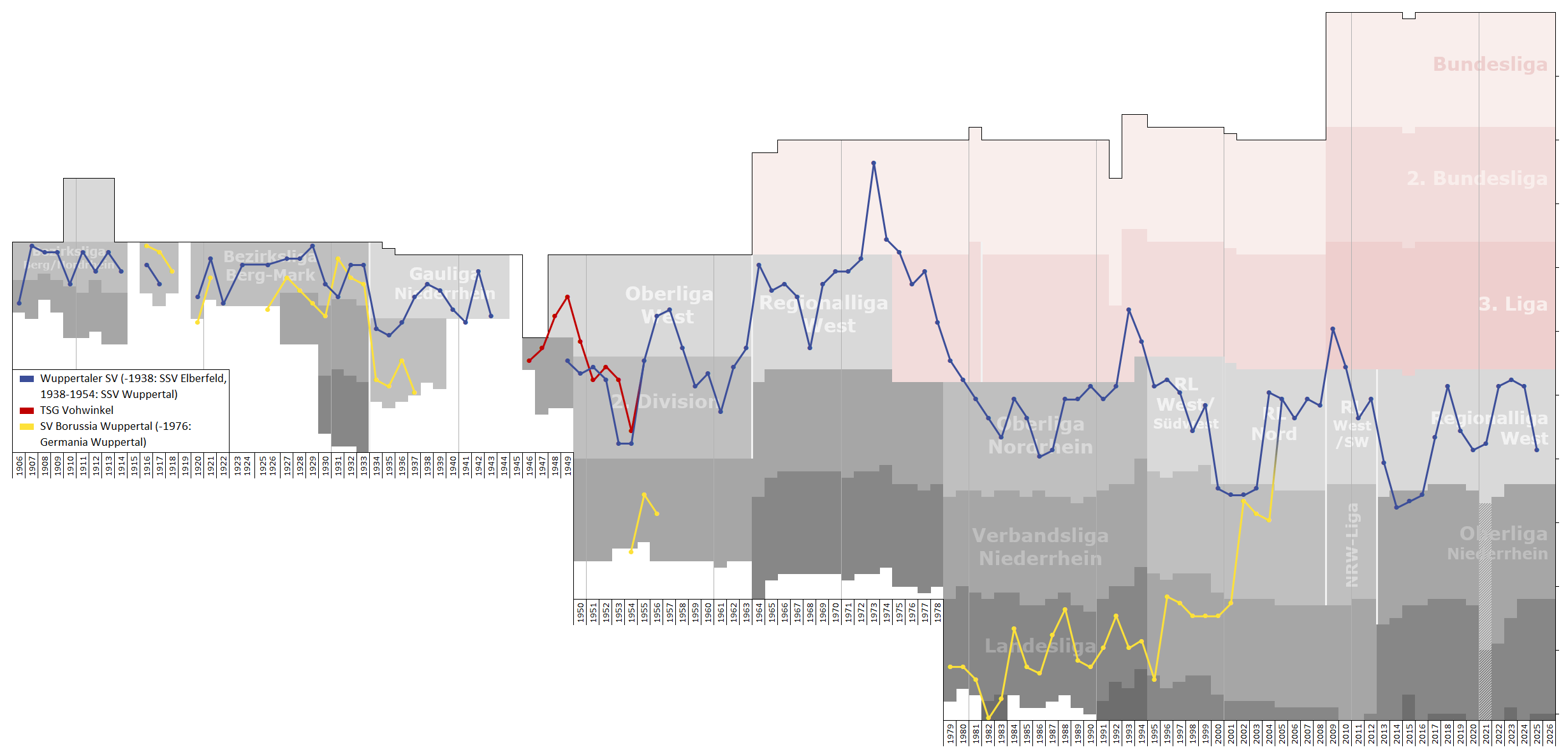
Historical chart of Wuppertal league performance

After World War II, TSG Vohwinkel emerged as the stronger side and took up play in the first division Oberliga West in 1947 where they would compete until being relegated after a 14th-place finish in 1950.

Both clubs were part of the 2. Oberliga West (II) through the early 1950s, SSV under the guidance of coach Fritz Szepan, one-time star of Schalke 04 which had dominated German football from the mid-1930s to the mid-1940s. The union of the two associations that created "Wuppertaler SV" in 1954 paid almost immediate dividends as the combined side vaulted to the top and captured the division title in 1954–55. Wuppertal's return to the Oberliga was less successful despite the presence of players such as rising star Horst Szymaniak and Austria's international Erich Probst. The club could not escape the lower half of the table and was relegated following a next-to-last place finish in 1958.

WSV returned to the top flight for the 1962–63 campaign, which was the last Oberliga season before the creation of the new first division Bundesliga. Although they had a poor regular season, the team enjoyed a good DFB-Pokal run, advancing to the semi-finals where they lost a closely fought match (0–1) to first division side and eventual cup winners Hamburger SV before a record hometown crowd of 40,000.

=== Rise to the Bundesliga ===
The following year, the club became part of the Regionalliga West, one of the five divisions in the newly established second-tier circuit. Wuppertal delivered a solid performance, finishing second in their division behind Alemannia Aachen. They remained competitive throughout the remainder of the 1960s and into the early 1970s. In 1972, they achieved a breakthrough by winning the Regionalliga West title and subsequently triumphing in the Bundesliga promotion playoffs. WSV dominated their opposition, winning all eight of their promotion round matches, a remarkable feat in the 11 seasons played under this playoff format.

=== Bundesliga 1972–75 ===
Die Löwen played three seasons in the top flight with their debut 1972–73 season being their most successful. While they never seriously challenged eventual champions Bayern Munich for the title, newly promoted WSV spent five weeks in second place before finally settling for a fourth-place finish – a result that has only been bettered twice by teams newly promoted to the Bundesliga.

The fourth-place finish earned the club a place in the 1973–74 UEFA Cup tournament the season after. They went out in the first round 6:8 on aggregate (1–4, 5–4) to Polish side Ruch Chorzów. In the league that season they only escaped relegation on goal difference after an 82nd minute away goal in the final match of their campaign in Stuttgart.

Widely regarded as having too old a roster to compete, in the third top tier season the club stumbled to an ignominious last place finish on 12 points. This stands as the second-worst Bundesliga result in history, only four points better than the Tasmania Berlin side of 1965–66. The only bright spot of this poor campaign was a 3–1 victory over the Bayern Munich side built around Franz Beckenbauer that dominated European football at the time.

=== Post-Bundesliga (1975) to 2013 ===
After the 1975 relegation from the Bundesliga, Wuppertal next played five seasons in the second tier 2. Bundesliga until 1980. From 1980 the played a dozen seasons in the Amateur Oberliga Nordrhein (III). A series of strong finishes in the late 80s eventually led to a return to the 2. Bundesliga for the 1992–93 and 1993–94 seasons before relegation once again to third-tier football in the Regionalliga West/Südwest.

The club had a close brush with bankruptcy in 1998 and the next season was sent down to the Oberliga Nordrhein (IV) for failing to pay their dues. By 2003 they had earned a return to the Regionalliga Nord (III).

In 2004, the club merged with Borussia Wuppertal to become Wuppertaler SV Borussia adopting the red and blue colours and logo of the more senior WSV. Borussia had been formed in 1976 through the union of SV Germania 1907 Wuppertal and VfL 1912 Wuppertal. Like SSV, Germania was also the successor to an Elberfeld club – Germania Elberfeld – which took part in the preliminary rounds of the national finals in the early 30s. While "Borussia" quickly developed into a competitive side, they were not financially strong enough to support their ambition and joined forces with WSV in hopes of returning the city to football prominence. From supporter's side, the additional name Borussia has been constantly rejected, due to the club's history and identification issues. This controversy and the recent merger has been frequently discussed at annual meetings for almost nine years before the era of chairman Runge ended in 2013.

In the 2007–08 DFB-Pokal (German Cup) tournament, Wuppertaler SV reached the Round of 16 after beating Erzgebirge Aue (4–3 on penalties) and Hertha BSC Berlin (2–0). They were put out by eventual cup winners Bayern Munich (2–5). Because of the small capacity of Stadion am Zoo, the match was played at Arena AufSchalke in Gelsenkirchen.

=== The era after chairman Runge ===
At an annual meeting on 24 May 2013 the club's name returned to Wuppertaler SV. A new administrative board was formed by the 13 members of Initiative WSV 2.0 of which Alexander Eichner was a member of. President Klaus Mathies resigned from this position to allow a smooth transition and for Eichner to take over. At a news conference on 4 June 2013 it was announced that the club was bankrupt, which resulted in an enforced relegation. Wuppertaler SV played in the fifth division, the Oberliga Niederrhein, until 2015–16 when a league championship took the club back up to the Regionalliga.

== Recent seasons ==
Year	Division	Level	Position
1999–2000	Oberliga Nordrhein	IV	1st
2000–01	Oberliga Nordrhein	IV	2nd
2001–02	Oberliga Nordrhein	IV	2nd
2002–03	Oberliga Nordrhein	IV	1st ↑
2003–04	Regionalliga Nord	III	4th
2004–05	Regionalliga Nord	III	5th
2005–06	Regionalliga Nord	III	8th
2006–07	Regionalliga Nord	III	5th
2007–08	Regionalliga Nord	III	6th
2008–09	3. Liga	III	14th
2009–10	3. Liga	III	20th ↓
2010–11	Regionalliga West	IV	8th
2011–12	Regionalliga West	IV	5th
2012–13	Regionalliga West	IV	15th ↓
2013–14	Oberliga Niederrhein	V	3rd
2014–15	Oberliga Niederrhein	V	2nd
2015–16	Oberliga Niederrhein	V	1st ↑
2016–17	Regionalliga West	IV	11th
2017–18	Regionalliga West	IV	3rd
2018–19	Regionalliga West	IV	10th
2019–20	Regionalliga West	IV	13th
2020–21	Regionalliga West	IV	12th
2021–22	Regionalliga West	IV	3rd
2022–23	Regionalliga West	IV	2nd
2023–24	Regionalliga West	IV	3rd
2024–25	Regionalliga West	IV	13th
2025–26	Regionalliga West	IV	16th ↓

== Honours ==
The club's honours:

- Regionalliga West
  - Champions: 1972
- Oberliga Nordrhein (IV)
  - Champions: 1990, 1992, 2000, 2003
- Oberliga Niederrhein (V)
  - Champions: 2016
- Lower Rhine Cup
  - Winners: 1981, 1985, 1999, 2000, 2005, 2007, 2021

== Fans ==
Despite the club's relative poor on field performance, the club draws big support. There are currently 19 supporter groups: Red Blue 1954, Treue Löwen, Die Wuppys 04, Die Falken, Teamgeist, Pflegestufe 4, Schwebende Jonges, Zooalarm Wuppertal, Red Blue Fanatics, Opus W, Sektion Gegengerade, Tradition 1954, Wupper-Piraten, WSV Fans Mittelrhein, Wupperlümmel's, Die Mecker Oppas, Wupperschlümpfe, Debakel Arrenberg and Llanymynech Wuppertaler ultras.

Many of the club's fans sympathise with Schalke 04, and have a long-standing friendship with Lok Leipzig; in the past the fans maintained somewhat amiable relations with fans of Hertha Berlin. Rot-Weiss Essen are the fiercest rivals, Rot-Weiß Oberhausen and Alemannia Aachen are the other fierce rivals, as are VfL Bochum and Fortuna Düsseldorf.

== Current squad ==
As of 8 September, 2026

Note: Flags indicate national team as defined under FIFA eligibility rules; some limited exceptions apply. Players may hold more than one non-FIFA nationality.

No.	Pos.	Nation	Player
1	GK	GER	Fotios Adamidis
2	DF	JPN	Subaru Nishimura
3	DF	GER	Felix Herzenbruch
4	DF	GER	Noel Westenberger
5	DF	GER	Jaden Korzynietz
6	MF	GER	Genc Lajqi
7	MF	GER	Semir Saric
8	MF	CRO	Duje Goles
9	FW	GER	Brightney Igbinadolor
10	FW	GER	Eren Albayrak
11	MF	GER	Sam Sausmikat
12	GK	GER	Max Glogau

No.	Pos.	Nation	Player
17	FW	IRQ	Arian Amyn
19	FW	POL	David Widlarz
20	MF	GER	Fabrizio Fili
21	MF	GER	Dario Biancardi
26	MF	GER	Linus Frölich
27	DF	GER	Yussuf Ayinla
30	MF	GER	Efe Tirpan
32	GK	GER	Maurice Horn
33	DF	KOS	Arlind Bajrami
34	DF	GER	Georgios Bozouris
39	DF	GER	Kilian Bielitza
44	DF	GER	Serhat Kacmaz

== Notable players ==
- (West Germany) Striker Günter "Meister" Pröpper (born 12 August 1941) played with Wuppertaler SV from 1970 to 1979 and represents the club's golden era of the early 70s. His 52 goals in the club's 1971–72 campaign set a second division record that still stands. In 87 Bundesliga matches he scored 39 goals. After retiring he settled in Wuppertal and has remained associated with the club.
- (West Germany) Outside forward Horst Szymaniak, who was with WSV from 1956 to 1959, participated in two World Cups. He is the only player from the club to be called to play for the national side while playing in Wuppertal, where he earned 20 of his 43 caps. He was one of the first German players to follow the big money to play professionally in Italy and won the European Champions Cup in 1964 with Inter Milan. Szymaniak was also an unfortunate member of the worst-ever Bundesliga side Tasmania 1900 Berlin,
- While Erich Probst enjoyed only limited success during his stay in Wuppertal (1956–58), he made 19 appearances for the Austria national football team and participated in the World Cup 1954 where Austria finished third. Probst scored six goals, tying him for second place with two other players among goalscorers at the competition.
- (West Germany) Alfred "Coppi" Beck, 1955–58, capped once for Germany when with FC St. Pauli.
- Erich Haase, 1956–68, played one international match for East Germany while with Turbine Halle.
- Waldemar Ksienzyk, 1992–94, played one international match for East Germany while with Dynamo Berlin.
- Erich Ribbeck, who later coached the Germany national team, started his career with SSV and later played with WSV. In his early days as a coach at Rot-Weiss Essen he used Günter Pröpper only rarely, which caused that player to move on to Wuppertaler SV.
- Mohammad Reza Adelkhani, played the 1968–69 season in Wuppertal. He joined Tehran club Esteghlal FC in 1973 and was capped 17 times for Iran.
- (Netherlands) Thomas Litjens
- (Ecuador) José Valencia
- (Romania) Sorin Răducanu

== Track and field ==
SSV Wuppertal brought their track and field department to the 1954 union that formed Wuppertaler SV. Athletes from the club have competed in the European and World championships as well as the Olympics. Some notable athletes from the club are:

- Manfred Kinder, 400m-Runner, European Champion, Olympic medalist
- Maria Jeibmann, 400m-Runner, German champion
- Manfred Knickenberg, 100m-/200m-Runner, Olympic participant, European championship medalist, German champion
- Maren Collin, 100m-/200m-Runner, European championship runner-up, German champion
- Ruth Limbach, 100m-/200m-Runner, German championship runner-up (1949)

== Former coaches ==
- Raymond Schwab (1954–1956)
- Edmund Conen (1956–1957)
- Walter Werner (1957)
- Jupp Schmidt (1957–1958)
- Emil Melcher (1958–1959)
- Willibald Kreß (1959–1961)
- Robert Gebhardt (1961–1965)
- Adi Preißler (1965–1967)
- Kuno Klötzer (1967–1968)
- Horst Buhtz (1968–1974)
- János Bédl (1974–1975)
- Diethelm Ferner (1975–1976)
- Herbert Burdenski (1976–1977)
- Erhard Ahmann (1977)
- Herbert Burdenski (1977–1978)
- Bernd Hoss (1978–1979)
- Rolf Müller (1979–1980)
- Heinz Lucas (1980)
- Rolf Müller (1980–1981)
- Kalli Hoffmann (1981–1982)
- Jonny Hey (1982–1983)
- Manfred Reichert (1983)
- Thomas Bartel (1983)
- Manfred Reichert (1983–1984)
- Detlef Pirsig (1984–1986)
- Günter Pröpper (1986)
- Rolf Müller (1986–1989)
- Dieter Tartemann (1989–1990)
- Wolfgang Jerat (1990–1992)
- Gerd Vom Bruch (1992–1993)
- Michael Lorkowski (1993–1994)
- Dieter Tartemann (1994)
- Werner Fuchs (1994–1996)
- Wolfgang Jerat (1996–1997)
- Ali Höfer (1997)
- Rudi Gores (1997–1999)
- Roman Geschlecht (1999)
- Frantisek Straka (1999–2001)
- Jonny Hey (2001–2002)
- Georg Kreß (2002–2004)
- Werner Kasper (2004)
- Uwe Fuchs (2005–2007)
- Wolfgang Jerat (1990–1992)
- Wolfgang Frank (2008)
- Christoph John (2008)
- Uwe Fuchs (2008–2010)
- Peter Radojewski (interim) (2010)
- Michael Dämgen (2010–2011)
- Karsten Hutwelker (2011)
- Hans-Günter Bruns (2011–2012)
- Jörg Jung (2012–2013)
- Peter Radojewski (2013)
- Reinhold Fanz (2013)
- Peter Radojewski (2013–2014)
- Thomas Richter (2014–2015)
- Stefan Vollmerhausen (2015–2018)
- Christian Britscho (2018)
- Adrian Alipour (2018–2019)
- Andreas Zimmermann (2019)
- Alexander Voigt (2019–2020)
- Pascal Bieler (2020)
- Alexander Voigt (2020)
- Björn Mehnert (2020–2022)
- Hüzeyfe Doğan (2022–2023)
- Christian Britscho (2023)
- Ersan Parlatan (2023–2024)
- René Klingbeil (2024)
- Sebastian Tyrała (2024–)
