= Georgi Donkov =

Bulgarian footballer

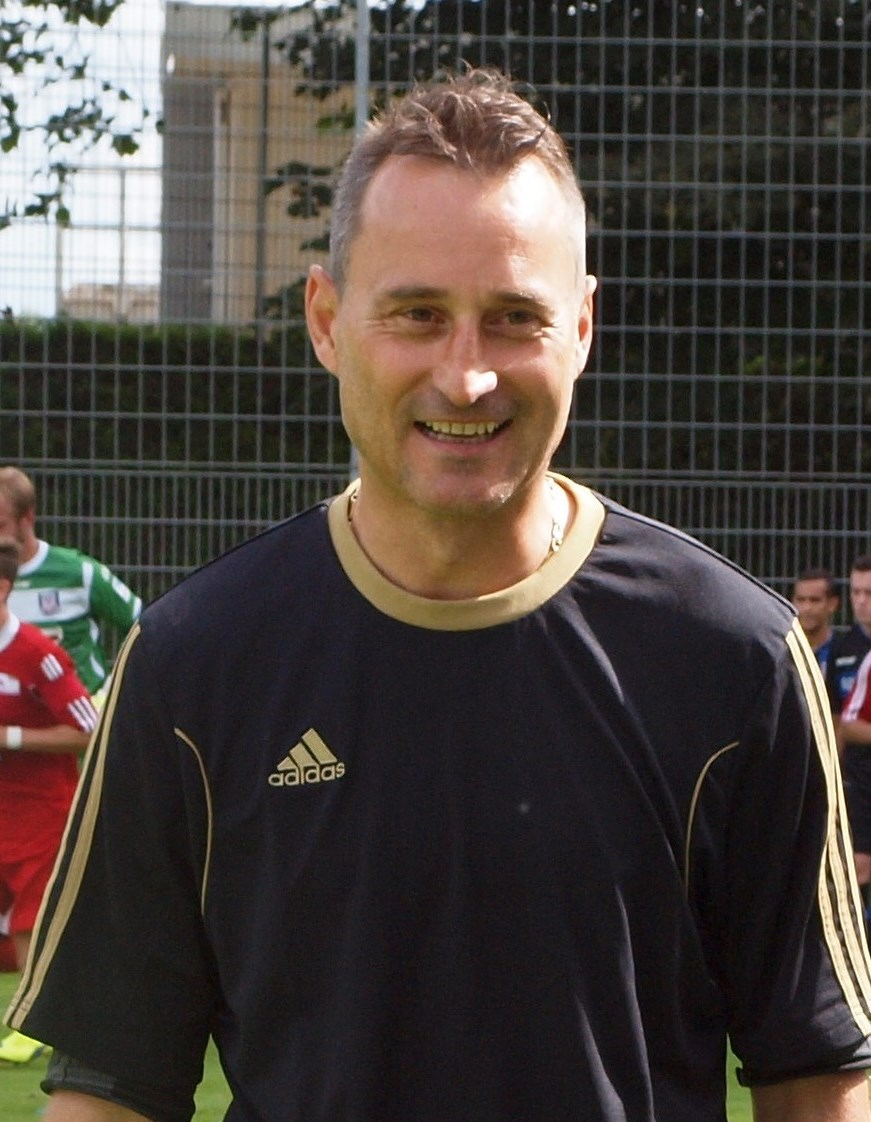

Personal information
- Full name: Georgi Dimitrov Donkov
- Date of birth: 2 June 1970 (age 56)
- Place of birth: Sofia, Bulgaria
- Height: 1.86 m (6 ft 1 in)
- Positions: Attacking midfielder; forward

Senior career*
Years	Team	Apps	(Gls)
1987–1993	Levski Sofia	110	(18)
1993–1995	Botev Plovdiv	49	(20)
1995–1996	CSKA Sofia	22	(5)
1996–1998	VfL Bochum	53	(13)
1998–2001	1. FC Köln	81	(10)
2002	Neuchâtel Xamax	6	(0)
2002–2003	Enosis Paralimni	13	(3)
2003–2005	SC Paderborn	50	(11)
2005–2006	Waldhof Mannheim	50	(25)
2007–2008	FSV Oggersheim	24	(5)
Total		458	(110)

International career
1993–2000	Bulgaria	10	(2)

Managerial career
- 2010–2012: Wacker Burghausen (assistant)
- 2011: Wacker Burghausen (caretaker)
- 2012–2013: Wacker Burghausen
- 2014: VDV-Camp
- 2015–2016: SSV Reutlingen
- 2016–2019: Bulgaria (assistant)
- 2019–2020: Levski Sofia (assistant)
- 2021–2023: SV Sandhausen (academy)
- 2023–2025: Bulgaria (assistant)
- * Club domestic league appearances and goals

Georgi Donkov (Bulgarian: Георги Донков; born 2 June 1970) is a Bulgarian former professional footballer who played as a forward.

== Club career ==
In his career Donkov played for Levski Sofia, Botev Plovdiv and CSKA Sofia. He played also in Germany for VfL Bochum, 1. FC Köln, SC Paderborn 07, SV Waldhof Mannheim and FSV Oggersheim, in Switzerland with Neuchâtel Xamax, and in Cyprus for Enosis Paralimni.

== International career ==
Donkov was a member of the Bulgaria national team with which he participated at Euro 1996.

== Coaching career ==
Donkov started his coaching career in the summer 2010, where he was appointed assistant coach under manager Mario Basler at Wacker Burghausen. On 14 May 2011, after manager Basler was fired, Donkov was named caretaker manager until the end of the season. Donkov continued as assistant coach, after a manager was hired during the summer break. In May 2012, after Reinhard Stumpf was fired, Donkov was once again named caretaker manager until the end of the season and later signed a permanent deal as the clubs new manager. Donkov was fired in September 2013.

=== International goals ===
Scores and results list Bulgaria's goal tally first, score column indicates score after each Donkov goal.

List of international goals scored by Georgi Donkov
No.	Date	Venue	Opponent	Score	Result	Competition
1	2 June 1996	Vasil Levski National Stadium, Sofia, Bulgaria	United Arab Emirates	3–1	4–1	Friendly
2	29 March 2000	Vasil Levski National Stadium, Sofia, Bulgaria	Belarus	2–0	4–1	Friendly

== Coaching career ==
On 9 June 2010, Donkov was named as the new assistant coach of 3. Liga club SV Wacker Burghausen. He became the assistant coach of his country's national football team in October 2016.

== Honours ==
Levski Sofia

- Bulgarian A PFG: 1988, 1993
- Bulgarian Cup: 1991, 1992
- Cup of the Soviet Army: 1988
