= Danny Winkler =

German footballer (born 1973)

Personal information
- Full name: Danny Winkler
- Date of birth: 16 August 1973 (age 53)
- Height: 1.87 m (6 ft 1 1/2 in)
- Position: Forward

Youth career
- MFC Lindenhof 08
- –1991: VfL Neckarau
- 1991–1992: SV Waldhof Mannheim

Senior career*
Years	Team	Apps	(Gls)
1992–1994	SV Waldhof Mannheim	17	(0)
1994–1996	TSG Pfeddersheim		
1996–1998	VfL Bochum	7	(0)
1998–1999	Stuttgarter Kickers	16	(3)
1999–2004	Eintracht Trier	140	(46)
2004–2006	TSG 1899 Hoffenheim	18	(7)
2006–2007	SV Schwetzingen		
- * Club domestic league appearances and goals

Danny Winkler (born 16 August 1973) is a retired German football forward.
