= Neşat Gülünoğlu =

German-born Turkish footballer

Personal information
- Full name: Neşat Gülünoğlu
- Date of birth: 4 January 1979 (age 47)
- Place of birth: Herne, West Germany
- Height: 1.74 m (5 ft 9 in)
- Position: Forward

Youth career
- VfB Börnig
- –1996: VfL Bochum

Senior career*
Years	Team	Apps	(Gls)
1996–1999	VfL Bochum	37	(4)
1999	Roma	0	(0)
2000	Sportfreunde Siegen		
2000	Waldhoff Mannheim		
2001	Westfalia Herne		
2001–2003	Kocaelispor		
2003–2004	Yurdumspor Köln		
2005	SSV Hagen		

International career
	Turkey U21	2	(0)
- * Club domestic league appearances and goals

Neşat Gülünoğlu (born 4 January 1979) is a German-born Turkish former football forward.
