= Nettersheim =

- Municipality
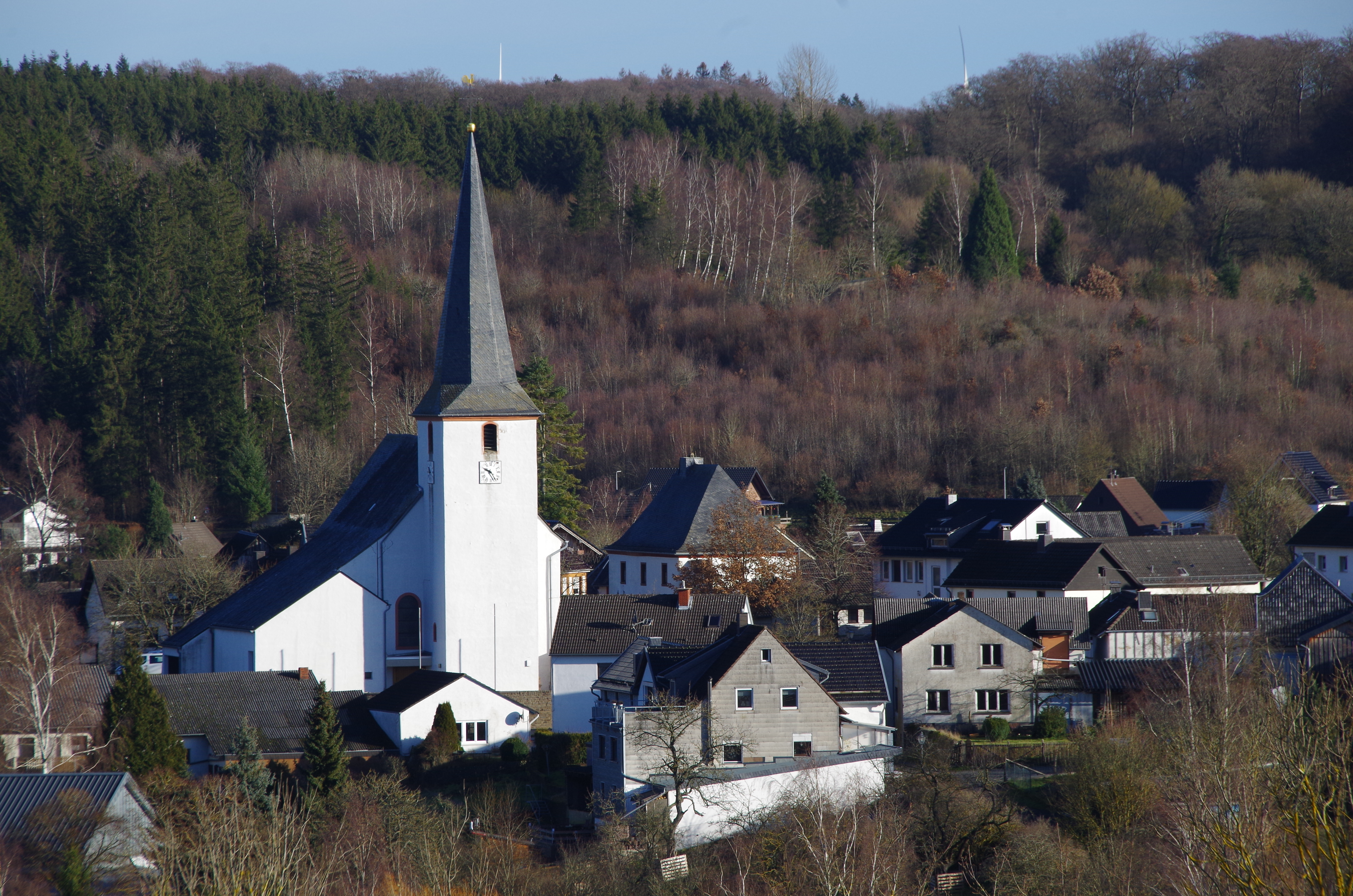

- Flag Coat of arms

- Location of Nettersheim within Euskirchen district
- Interactive map of Nettersheim
- Location within Germany Location within North Rhine-Westphalia
- Coordinates: 50°29′33″N 6°37′47″E
- Country: Germany
- State: North Rhine-Westphalia
- Admin. region: Köln
- District: Euskirchen

Government
  - Mayor (2020–25): Norbert Crump (CDU)

Area
  - Total: 94.35 km^{2} (36.43 sq mi)
- Elevation: 350–590 m (1,150–1,940 ft)

Population (2025-12-31)
  - Total: 8,216
  - Density: 87.08/km^{2} (225.5/sq mi)
- Time zone: UTC+01:00 (CET)
  - Summer (DST): UTC+02:00 (CEST)
- Postal codes: 53947
- Dialling codes: 02486
- Vehicle registration: EU
- Website: www.nettersheim.de

Nettersheim (German pronunciation: [ˈnɛtɐsˌhaɪm]) is a municipality in the district of Euskirchen in the state of North Rhine-Westphalia, Germany. It is located in the Eifel hills, approx. 20 km south-west of Euskirchen. The rivers Erft and Urft have their source in the municipality.

== Geography ==
The district of the city Netterheim is built out of the constituent communities (Ortsteile):

- Zingsheim, also administrative headquarters
- Pesch
- Roderath
- Tondorf
- Bouderath
- Buir
- Engelgau
- Frohngau
- Holzmülheim
- Marmagen
- Nettersheim (accordingly)

== Population ==
Historical population

Year	Pop.	±% p.a.
1965	5,580	—
1970	5,841	+0.92%
1975	5,769	−0.25%
1980	5,919	+0.51%
1985	6,180	+0.87%
1990	6,593	+1.30%
1995	7,298	+2.05%

Year	Pop.	±% p.a.
2000	7,883	+1.55%
2005	8,013	+0.33%
2010	7,687	−0.83%
2015	7,469	−0.57%
2020	7,705	+0.62%
2025	8,216	+1.29%

Source: Landesdatabank Nordrhein-Westfalen

== Education and culture ==
- Kindergarten (5 in city district)
- Family center
- Primary school (2 in city district)
- Secondary school (lower level, Hauptschule)
- House of literature, with included library
- Nature information centrum Eifel
- Archeological park with several information points
- Public education center
- Culture and Art center, located at the old railway station building
- Permanent exhibition, located at town hall (since 2007)
- Art installation, named „Macht der Drei“
- Agricultural museum Nettersheimer Hof
- Wood competence center

== Tourism ==
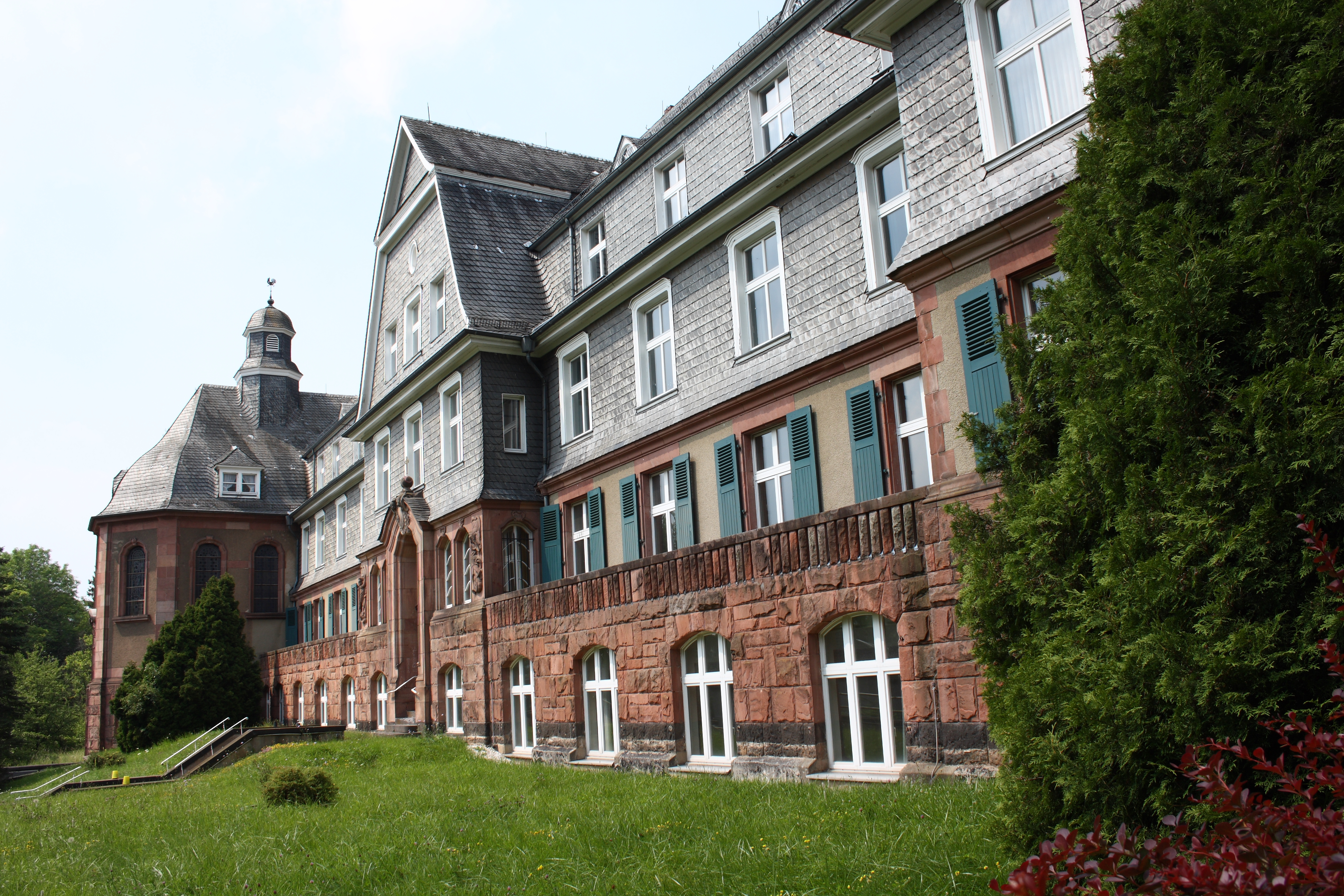
Nettersheim former Herz-Jesu-Kloster (monastery)

In the city of Nettersheim there is a tourist information, which is located at the „Naturzentrum Eifel” building.

=== Hiking ===
Several hiking trails start or pass by Nettersheim, such as:

- Eifelsteig
- Römerkanal-Path
- Jakobsweg
- Eifeler Quellenpfad
- Eifeler Kräuterpfad

== Climate ==
Climate data for Nettersheim (Eifel)
Month	Jan	Feb	Mar	Apr	May	Jun	Jul	Aug	Sep	Oct	Nov	Dec	Year
Mean daily maximum °C (°F)	1.4 (34.5)	3.1 (37.6)	6.6 (43.9)	10.7 (51.3)	15.2 (59.4)	18.4 (65.1)	19.5 (67.1)	19 (66)	16.7 (62.1)	11.9 (53.4)	5.9 (42.6)	2.8 (37.0)	10.9 (51.7)
Daily mean °C (°F)	−0.8 (30.6)	0.4 (32.7)	3.2 (37.8)	6.6 (43.9)	10.7 (51.3)	13.8 (56.8)	15.3 (59.5)	14.9 (58.8)	12.6 (54.7)	8.5 (47.3)	3.5 (38.3)	0.7 (33.3)	7.5 (45.4)
Mean daily minimum °C (°F)	−2.9 (26.8)	−2.3 (27.9)	−0.2 (31.6)	2.5 (36.5)	6.2 (43.2)	9.3 (48.7)	11.1 (52.0)	10.9 (51.6)	8.6 (47.5)	5.1 (41.2)	1.1 (34.0)	−1.3 (29.7)	4.0 (39.2)
Average rainfall mm (inches)	86 (3.4)	74 (2.9)	69 (2.7)	63 (2.5)	78 (3.1)	88 (3.5)	97 (3.8)	90 (3.5)	72 (2.8)	71 (2.8)	85 (3.3)	105 (4.1)	978 (38.5)
Source: Climate Nettersheim, accessed 20 December 2017

== People ==
- Cornelius Agrippa (1486–1535), German Renaissance polymath, writer, physician and legal scholar
- Horst Lichter (born 1962), German cook, television cook, cookbook author and moderator
