= Engibar Engibarov =

Bulgarian footballer

Personal information
- Full name: Engibar Engibarov
- Date of birth: 5 September 1971 (age 55)
- Height: 1.81 m (5 ft 11 1/2 in)
- Positions: Right back; central defender

Senior career*
Years	Team	Apps	(Gls)
1989–1991	Spartak Varna	43	(0)
1991–1992	Beroe Stara Zagora	31	(0)
1993–1994	Botev Plovdiv	26	(0)
1994–1995	Slavia Sofia	27	(0)
1995–1996	CSKA Sofia	15	(0)
1996	VfL Bochum	5	(0)
1997	Slavia Sofia	14	(1)
1997	Spartak Varna	16	(0)
1998	Greuther Fürth	12	(0)
1998	Cherno More Varna	11	(0)
1999–2000	Belasitsa Petrich	21	(6)
2001–2002	Botev Plovdiv	20	(2)
2003–2006	Dunav Ruse	68	(19)
Total		309	(28)

International career
1995	Bulgaria	5	(0)

Managerial career
- 2005–2006: Dunav Ruse
- 2013–2014: Al Nasr – Dubai – U15
- 2015–2016: Botev Plovdiv, assistant coach
- 2017–2019: Spartak Varna
- 2019: Vitosha Bistritsa
- * Club domestic league appearances and goals

Engibar Engibarov (Bulgarian: Енгибар Енгибаров; born 5 September 1971) is a former Bulgarian footballer who played as a defender. He is currently sporting director at Spartak Varna.

== Managerial career ==
On 29 December 2017 he was announced as the new manager of his youth club Spartak Varna. He managed to secure the first place in Third League without submitting a loss in a league match. On 6 June 2019 he was announced as the new manager of the First League team Vitosha Bistritsa.

== Career statistics ==
=== Club ===
Club performance			League		Cup		Total	
Season	Club	League	Apps	Goals	Apps	Goals	Apps	Goals
Bulgaria			League		Bulgarian Cup		Total	
1989–90	Spartak Varna	B Group	14	0				
1990–91	Spartak Varna	B Group	29	0				
1991–92	Beroe	A Group	18	0				
1992–93	Beroe	A Group	13	0				
1992–93	Botev Plovdiv	A Group	9	0				
1993–94	Botev Plovdiv	A Group	17	0				
1994–95	Slavia Sofia	A Group	27	0				
1995–96	CSKA Sofia	A Group	15	0	3	0	18	0
Germany			League		DFB-Pokal		Total	
1996–97	VfL Bochum	Bundesliga	0	0	0	0	0	0
Bulgaria			League		Bulgarian Cup		Total	
1996–97	Slavia Sofia	A Group	14	1				
1997–98	Spartak Varna	A Group	6	0				
Germany			League		DFB-Pokal		Total	
1997–98	Greuther Fürth	2. Bundesliga	2	0	0	0	2	0
Bulgaria			League		Bulgarian Cup		Total	
1998–99	Cherno More	B Group	11	0				
1998–99	Belasitsa Petrich	B Group						
1999–00	Belasitsa Petrich	A Group	21	6				
2001–02	Botev Plovdiv	B Group	20	2				
2003–04	Dunav Ruse	B Group	28	11				
2004–05	Dunav Ruse	B Group	31	8				
2005–06	Dunav Ruse	B Group	9	0				
Total	Bulgaria							
Total	Germany		2	0	0	0	2	0
Career total								
