= 2002–03 DFB-Pokal =

Tournament details
- Country: Germany
- Teams: 64

Final positions
- Champions: Bayern Munich
- Runners-up: 1. FC Kaiserslautern

Tournament statistics
- Matches played: 63
- Top goal scorer: Giovane Élber (6)

The 2002–03 DFB-Pokal was the 60th season of the annual German football cup competition. Sixty-four teams competed in the tournament of six rounds which began on 28 August 2002 and ended on 31 May 2003. In the final, Bayern Munich defeated 1. FC Kaiserslautern 3–1, thereby claiming their 11th title.

== Matches ==
Times up to 26 October 2002 and from 30 March 2003 are CEST (UTC+2). Times from 27 October 2002 to 29 March 2003 are CET (UTC+1).

=== First round ===
28 August 2002	Tennis Borussia Berlin	1–2	FC St. Pauli	Berlin
	Radtke 66'	Report (in German)	Patschinski 4'; Yang 64'	Stadium: Olympiastadion; Attendance: 2,500; Referee: Stefan Weber (Eisenach)

30 August 2002	VfB Lübeck	2–3 (a.e.t.)	MSV Duisburg	Lübeck
	Kruppke 60'; Bärwolf 87'	Report (in German)	Voss 7'; Zeyer 54' (pen.); Bönig 117'	Stadium: Lohmühle Stadion; Attendance: 7,000; Referee: Thomas Frank (Hannover)

30 August 2002	Eintracht Braunschweig	1–2	SSV Reutlingen	Braunschweig
	Mazingu-Dinzey 60'	Report (in German)	Würll 40', 69'	Stadium: Stadion an der Hamburger Straße; Attendance: 7,300; Referee: Stefan Trautmann (Bodenwerder)

30 August 2002	1. FC Saarbrücken	1–1 (a.e.t.) (3–4 p)	SV Waldhof Mannheim	Saarbrücken
	Hallé 5'	Report (in German)	Zinnow 38'	Stadium: Ludwigsparkstadion; Attendance: 3,200; Referee: Markus Weber (Bergkamen)
	Penalties
	Nsaliwa (penalty missed); Rosen (penalty scored); Örtülü (penalty scored); Marasa (penalty scored); Oelkuch (penalty missed)		Kowalik (penalty missed); Hoersen (penalty scored); Kern (penalty scored); Maximov (penalty scored); Licht (penalty scored)

30 August 2002	SpVgg Unterhaching	1–1 (a.e.t.) (4–2 p)	Mainz 05	Munich
	Zimmermann 43'	Report (in German)	Babatz 86'	Stadium: Generali Sportpark; Attendance: 1,650; Referee: Dominik Marks (Berlin)
	Penalties
	Copado (penalty scored); Lust (penalty scored); Zimmermann (penalty scored); Straube (penalty scored)		Voronin (penalty scored); Weiland (penalty missed); Babatz (penalty scored); Schwarz (penalty missed)

30 August 2002	1. FC Schweinfurt 05	1–2 (a.e.t.)	1. FC Union Berlin	Schweinfurt
	Popović 84'	Report (in German)	Fiél 55'; Koilov 101'	Attendance: 2,500; Referee: Markus Schmidt (Stuttgart)

30 August 2002	1899 Hoffenheim	4–1	SpVgg Greuther Fürth	Sinsheim
	Koné 12'; Teinert 51'; Ollhoff 55'; Thee 89'	Report (in German)	Xie 17'	Attendance: 3,000; Referee: Lutz Wagner (Kriftel)

30 August 2002	Eintracht Trier	0–2	1. FC Nürnberg	Trier
		Report (in German)	Popović 19'; Ćirić 51'	Stadium: Moselstadion; Attendance: 10,500; Referee: Kammerer (Karlsruhe)

31 August 2002	Wacker Burghausen	0–2	Energie Cottbus	Burghausen
		Report (in German)	Kałużny 33'; Miriuță 38'	Attendance: 6,200; Referee: Knut Kircher (Rottenburg)

31 August 2002	SC Paderborn	1–4	VfB Stuttgart	Paderborn
	Gerov 68'	Report (in German)	Kurányi 51', 90'; Amanatidis 75'; Hleb 90'	Attendance: 3,700; Referee: Otte (Damme)

31 August 2002	Erzgebirge Aue	1–3	VfL Bochum	Aue
	Broum 3'	Report (in German)	Buckley 24'; Freier 43'; Hashemian 60'	Stadium: Erzgebirgsstadion; Attendance: 6,500; Referee: Hartmut Strampe (Handorf)

31 August 2002	Werder Bremen (A)	0–3	Bayern Munich	Bremen
		Report (in German)	Giovane Élber 51'; Pizarro 64'; Ballack 65'	Stadium: Weserstadion; Attendance: 16,400; Referee: Jürgen Jansen (Essen)

31 August 2002	EFC Stahl	0–1	Werder Bremen	Eisenhüttenstadt
		Report (in German)	Charisteas 10'	Attendance: 5,000; Referee: Thorsten Kinhöfer (Herne)

31 August 2002	Concordia Ihrhove	0–3	Borussia Dortmund	Ihrhove
		Report (in German)	Heinrich 57'; Koller 82'; Addo 83'	Attendance: 15,000; Referee: Kai Voss (Großhansdorf)

31 August 2002	FC Schönberg	0–6	Hamburger SV	Schönberg
		Report (in German)	Wicky 6', 56'; Romeo 47', 89'; Albertz 74'; Christensen 80'	Attendance: 6,000; Referee: Manuel Gräfe (Berlin)

31 August 2002	VfR Aalen	2–3 (a.e.t.)	Hannover 96	Aalen
	Hering 7', 45'	Report (in German)	Linke 9'; N'Kufo 83'; Gorges 98'	Stadium: Städtisches Waldstadion; Attendance: 5,000; Referee: Günter Perl (Munich)

31 August 2002	Kickers Offenbach	3–1 (a.e.t.)	Karlsruher SC	Offenbach
	Falk 35' (pen.); Kagiouzis 100', 120' (pen.)	Report (in German)	Labbadia 2'	Stadium: Bieberer Berg Stadion; Attendance: 5,800; Referee: Felix Brych (Munich)

31 August 2002	Jahn Regensburg	1–2	LR Ahlen	Regensburg
	Zani 7'	Report (in German)	Schmidt 54' (o.g.); Feinbier 78'	Attendance: 5,000; Referee: Wolfgang Walz (Öhringen)

31 August 2002	VfL Wolfsburg (A)	1–3	1. FC Köln	Wolfsburg
	Kolm 32'	Report (in German)	Kurth 36'; Sinkala 53'; Kioyo 78'	Attendance: 2,850; Referee: Lutz Michael Fröhlich (Berlin)

31 August 2002	Bahlinger SC	1–0	Alemannia Aachen	Bahlingen
	Sieah 13'	Report (in German)		Attendance: 1,700; Referee: Raquet (Weilerbach)

31 August 2002	Hallescher FC	1–3	SC Freiburg	Halle
	Lesch 15'	Report (in German)	Männer 2'; Tskitishvili 16'; Ramdane 44'	Stadium: Kurt-Wabbel-Stadion; Attendance: 5,500; Referee: Uwe Kemmling (Kleinburgwedel)

31 August 2002	Bayern Munich (A)	1–2	Schalke 04	Munich
	Hasenhüttl 66'	Report (in German)	Sand 14'; Mpenza 63'	Stadium: Stadion an der Grünwalder Strasse; Attendance: 5,100; Referee: Edgar Steinborn (Sinzig)

1 September 2002	Holstein Kiel	1–1 (a.e.t.) (3–0 p)	Hertha BSC	Kiel
	Rose 44'	Report (in German)	Preetz 53'	Stadium: Holsteinstadion; Attendance: 9,300; Referee: Matthias Anklam (Buchholz in der Nordheide)
	Penalties
	Guščinas (penalty scored); Trulsen (penalty scored); Rose (penalty scored)		Pinto (penalty missed); Schmidt (penalty missed); Hartmann (penalty missed)

1 September 2002	Rot-Weiss Erfurt	2–3 (a.e.t.)	Eintracht Frankfurt	Erfurt
	Džihić 52'; Okić 85'	Report (in German)	Guié-Mien 17'; Jones 68'; Skela 118'	Stadium: Steigerwaldstadion; Attendance: 8,210; Referee: Michael Weiner (Giesen)

1 September 2002	Sportfreunde Siegen	0–1 (a.e.t.)	Rot-Weiss Oberhausen	Siegen
		Report (in German)	Radulović 107'	Attendance: 4,798; Referee: Mike Pickel (Mendig)

1 September 2002	1. FC Saarbrücken (A)	0–5	Arminia Bielefeld	Saarbrücken
		Report (in German)	Bogdanović 22'; Wichniarek 43'; Hansén 57'; Reinhardt 63'; Diabang 80'	Attendance: 1,200; Referee: André Stachowiak (Duisburg)

1 September 2002	Alemannia Aachen (A)	0–7	1860 München	Aachen
		Report (in German)	Max 25', 61', 67', 78'; Costa 54'; Lauth 66'; Wiesinger 89'	Attendance: 3,500; Referee: Detlef Scheppe (Wenden)

1 September 2002	FSV Salmrohr	0–2	VfL Wolfsburg	Salmtal
		Report (in German)	Klimowicz 60'; Karhan 81'	Attendance: 3,500; Referee: Georg Schalk (Augsburg)

1 September 2002	USC Paloma	0–5	1. FC Kaiserslautern	Hamburg
		Report (in German)	Lokvenc 19', 36'; Klose 54', 85'; Basler 62'	Attendance: 7,800; Referee: Babak Rafati (Hannover)

1 September 2002	Mainz 05 (A)	0–2	Hansa Rostock	Mainz
		Report (in German)	Kientz 26'; Salou 64'	Attendance: 3,000; Referee: Peter Lange (Filderstadt)

1 September 2002	SV Babelsberg 03	0–1	Borussia Mönchengladbach	Potsdam
		Report (in German)	Hausweiler 33'	Stadium: Karl-Liebknecht-Stadion; Attendance: 6,400; Referee: Jörg Keßler (Höhenkirchen)

1 September 2002	Rot-Weiss Essen	0–1	Bayer Leverkusen	Essen
		Report (in German)	Lúcio 24'	Stadium: Georg-Melches-Stadion; Attendance: 21,000; Referee: Herbert Fandel (Kyllburg)

=== Second round ===
5 November 2002	1860 München	2–2 (a.e.t.) (8–7 p)	VfL Wolfsburg	Munich
	Max 17'; Costa 20'	Report (in German)	Munteanu 21'; Klimowicz 50'	Stadium: Olympiastadion; Attendance: 5,000; Referee: Markus Schmidt (Stuttgart)
	Penalties
	Häßler (penalty scored); Borimirov (penalty missed); Meyer (penalty missed); T. Hoffmann (penalty scored); Šuker (penalty scored); Lauth (penalty scored); Costa (penalty scored); Cerny (penalty missed); Schroth (penalty scored); Votava (penalty scored); Jentzsch (penalty scored)		Marić (penalty scored); Karhan (penalty scored); Ponte (penalty missed); Klimowicz (penalty missed); Petrov (penalty scored); Schnoor (penalty scored); Biliškov (penalty scored); Rau (penalty missed); Sarpei (penalty scored); Rytter (penalty scored); Reitmaier (penalty missed)

5 November 2002	Hansa Rostock	1–0	Eintracht Frankfurt	Rostock
	Meggle 90'	Report (in German)		Stadium: Ostseestadion; Attendance: 10,000; Referee: Detlef Scheppe (Wenden)

5 November 2002	Hamburger SV	2–0	MSV Duisburg	Hamburg
	Maltritz 52'; Christensen 73'	Report (in German)		Stadium: Volksparkstadion; Attendance: 25,000; Referee: Hartmut Strampe (Handorf)

5 November 2002	SC Freiburg	3–0	Borussia Dortmund	Freiburg
	Coulibaly 8'; Männer 42'; Zeyer 54'	Report (in German)		Stadium: Dreisamstadion; Attendance: 24,000; Referee: Lutz Wagner (Kriftel)

5 November 2002	Rot-Weiss Oberhausen	1–0	Arminia Bielefeld	Oberhausen
	Radulović 23'	Report (in German)		Attendance: 6,000; Referee: Thomas Frank (Hannover)

5 November 2002	1899 Hoffenheim	1–5	1. FC Köln	Sinsheim
	Eller 78'	Report (in German)	Kioyo 28'; Kreuz 35'; Happe 43'; Scherz 59'; Sinkala 66'	Attendance: 4,600; Referee: Manuel Gräfe (Berlin)

5 November 2002	SpVgg Unterhaching	1–0	1. FC Union Berlin	Munich
	Leitl 70'	Report (in German)		Stadium: Generali Sportpark; Attendance: 1,800; Referee: Stefan Trautmann (Bodenwerder)

6 November 2002	Bahlinger SC	1–2	SV Waldhof Mannheim	Bahlingen
	Blank 33'	Report (in German)	Ifejiagwa 23'; Zinnow 88'	Attendance: 1,500; Referee: Hermann Albrecht (Kaufbeuren)

6 November 2002	Bayern Munich	2–1	Hannover 96	Munich
	Salihamidžić 56' (pen.); Santa Cruz 59'	Report (in German)	N'Kufo 90' (pen.)	Stadium: Olympiastadion; Attendance: 8,000; Referee: Knut Kircher (Rottenburg)

6 November 2002	Holstein Kiel	1–2	VfL Bochum	Kiel
	Guščinas 32'	Report (in German)	Wosz 29'; Freier 53'	Stadium: Holsteinstadion; Attendance: 8,000; Referee: Torsten Koop (Lüttenmark)

6 November 2002	Energie Cottbus	0–1	1. FC Kaiserslautern	Cottbus
		Report (in German)	Timm 83'	Stadium: Stadion der Freundschaft; Attendance: 7,000; Referee: Peter Gagelmann (Bremen)

6 November 2002	Bayer Leverkusen	3–0	VfB Stuttgart	Leverkusen
	Sebescen 46'; Bierofka 62', 82'	Report (in German)		Stadium: BayArena; Attendance: 22,500; Referee: Markus Merk (Otterbach)

6 November 2002	FC St. Pauli	0–3	Werder Bremen	Hamburg
		Report (in German)	Magnin 16'; Aílton 47'; Daun 49'	Stadium: Millerntor-Stadion; Attendance: 19,000; Referee: Florian Meyer (Burgdorf)

6 November 2002	Kickers Offenbach	2–3 (a.e.t.)	1. FC Nürnberg	Offenbach
	Müller 5'; Petry 12'	Report (in German)	Ćirić 47', 87', 110'	Stadium: Bieberer Berg; Attendance: 12,000; Referee: Keßler (Wogau)

6 November 2002	LR Ahlen	3–1	SSV Reutlingen	Ahlen
	Feinbier 37', 69'; Chiquinho 74'	Report (in German)	Malchow 76'	Stadium: Wersestadion; Attendance: 1,200; Referee: Mike Pickel (Mendig)

6 November 2002	Schalke 04	5–0	Borussia Mönchengladbach	Gelsenkirchen
	Asamoah 22'; Sand 30', 33', 55'; Mpenza 50'	Report (in German)		Stadium: Arena AufSchalke; Attendance: 60,600; Referee: Peter Sippel (Munich)

=== Round of 16 ===
3 December 2002	Hamburger SV	0–1	VfL Bochum	Hamburg
		Report (in German)	Freier 35'	Stadium: Volksparkstadion; Attendance: 35,100; Referee: Peter Sippel (Munich)

3 December 2002	1860 München	2–1	Rot-Weiss Oberhausen	Munich
	Šuker 63'; Häßler 85' (pen.)	Report (in German)	Radulović 25'	Stadium: Olympiastadion; Attendance: 3,500; Referee: Torsten Koop (Lüttenmark)

3 December 2002	Bayer Leverkusen	2–1	SV Waldhof Mannheim	Leverkusen
	França 63'; Schneider 75' (pen.)	Report (in German)	Plassnegger 50'	Stadium: BayArena; Attendance: 22,000; Referee: Günter Perl (Munich)

3 December 2002	SpVgg Unterhaching	3–2	Hansa Rostock	Munich
	Strehmel 54'; Vaccaro 57', 70'	Report (in German)	Arvidsson 15', 63'	Stadium: Generali Sportpark; Attendance: 3,500; Referee: Peter Gagelmann (Bremen)

4 December 2002	1. FC Kaiserslautern	2–0	SC Freiburg	Kaiserslautern
	Ramzy 64'; Lincoln 67'	Report (in German)		Stadium: Fritz-Walter-Stadion; Attendance: 16,900; Referee: Thorsten Kinhöfer (Herne)

4 December 2002	1. FC Nürnberg	0–2	1. FC Köln	Nuremberg
		Report (in German)	Scherz 48', 77'	Stadium: Frankenstadion; Attendance: 16,300; Referee: Uwe Kemmling (Kleinburgwedel)

4 December 2002	LR Ahlen	1–2	Werder Bremen	Ahlen
	Arnold 48'	Report (in German)	Charisteas 16'; Klasnić 89'	Stadium: Wersestadion; Attendance: 9,700; Referee: Hermann Albrecht (Kaufbeuren)

4 December 2002	Bayern Munich	0–0 (a.e.t.) (5–4 p)	Schalke 04	Munich
		Report (in German)		Stadium: Olympiastadion; Attendance: 20,000; Referee: Florian Meyer (Burgdorf)
	Penalties
	Ballack (penalty scored); Jeremies (penalty scored); Hargreaves (penalty scored); N. Kovač (penalty scored); Santa Cruz (penalty scored)		Sand (penalty missed); Möller (penalty scored); Vermant (penalty scored); Hajto (penalty scored); Wilmots (penalty scored)

=== Quarter-finals ===
4 February 2003	Bayern Munich	8–0	1. FC Köln	Munich
	Giovane Élber 7', 33', 70'; Hargreaves 20'; Schweinsteiger 31', 51'; Zé Roberto 56'; Sagnol 88'	Report (in German)		Stadium: Olympiastadion; Attendance: 13,000; Referee: Herbert Fandel (Kyllburg)

5 February 2003	VfL Bochum	3–3 (a.e.t.) (3–4 p)	1. FC Kaiserslautern	Bochum
	Fahrenhorst 8'; Reis 33'; Christiansen 105'	Report (in German)	Lokvenc 22', 27' (102)	Stadium: Ruhrstadion; Attendance: 22,200; Referee: Franz-Xaver Wack (Biberbach)
	Penalties
	Schindzielorz (penalty missed); Reis (penalty missed); Colding (penalty scored); Guðjónsson (penalty scored); Christiansen (penalty scored)		Koch (penalty missed); Klose (penalty scored); Lokvenc (penalty scored); Grammozis (penalty scored); Bjelica (penalty scored)

5 February 2003	SpVgg Unterhaching	2–2 (a.e.t.) (4–5 p)	Bayer Leverkusen	Munich
	Vaccaro 46'; Šukalo 63'	Report (in German)	França 18'; Ramelow 49'	Stadium: Generali Sportpark; Attendance: 6,500; Referee: Florian Meyer (Burgdorf)
	Penalties
	Grassow (penalty scored); Copado (penalty scored); Vaccaro (penalty scored); Strehmel (penalty scored); Omodiagbe (penalty missed)		Schneider (penalty scored); Neuville (penalty scored); Berbatov (penalty scored); Bierofka (penalty scored); Butt (penalty scored)

5 February 2003	1860 München	1–4 (a.e.t.)	Werder Bremen	Munich
	Lauth 80'	Report (in German)	Klasnić 85', 105'; Charisteas 94', 120'	Stadium: Olympiastadion; Attendance: 5,000; Referee: Hellmut Krug (Gelsenkirchen)

=== Semi-finals ===
4 March 2003	1. FC Kaiserslautern	3–0	Werder Bremen	Kaiserslautern
	Lincoln 8'; Klose 52'; Timm 80'	Report (in German)		Stadium: Fritz-Walter-Stadion; Attendance: 28,000; Referee: Lutz Wagner (Kriftel)

5 March 2003	Bayern Munich	3–1	Bayer Leverkusen	Munich
	Ballack 30'; Giovane Élber 57', 58'	Report (in German)	Ramelow 52'	Stadium: Olympiastadion; Attendance: 15,000; Referee: Edgar Steinborn (Sinzig)

=== Final ===
31 May 2003
19:30 CEST

Bayern Munich	3–1	1. FC Kaiserslautern
Ballack 3', 10' (pen.); Pizarro 50'	Report	Klose 80'

Olympiastadion, Berlin
Attendance: 70,490
Referee: Lutz Michael Fröhlich (Berlin)
