= 2002–03 Regionalliga =

9th season of the Regionalliga as a third-level league

Regionalliga
- Season: 2002–03
- Promoted: Erzgebirge Aue; VfL Osnabrück; SpVgg Unterhaching; Jahn Regensburg
- Relegated: SC Verl; SV Babelsberg 03; Bayer Leverkusen (A); Dresdner SC; SV Darmstadt 98; Eintracht Frankfurt (A); Borussia Neunkirchen
- Matches: 648
- Goals: 1,821 (2.81 per match)
- Top goalscorer: Francisco Copado (SpVgg Unterhaching) - 24
- Total attendance: 1,740,933
- Average attendance: 2,686

The 2002–03 Regionalliga season was the ninth season of the Regionalliga at tier three (III) of the German football league system.

The Regionalliga was split into two divisions, the Regionalliga Nord and the Regionalliga Süd. The league champions, Erzgebirge Aue and SpVgg Unterhaching, and the runners-up in both divisions, VfL Osnabrück and Jahn Regensburg, were promoted to the 2003–04 2. Bundesliga.

== Teams ==
SV Babelsberg 03, 1. FC Saarbrücken, 1. FC Schweinfurt 05 and SpVgg Unterhaching came down from the 2001–02 2. Bundesliga, replacing VfB Lübeck, Eintracht Braunschweig, Wacker Burghausen and Eintracht Trier.

Borussia Dortmund (A), Dynamo Dresden, Hamburger SV (A), 1. FC Köln (A), FC Augsburg, Eintracht Frankfurt (A) Borussia Neunkirchen and SC Pfullendorf were promoted from the Oberliga, replacing 1. FC Magdeburg, Fortuna Düsseldorf, Fortuna Köln, VfR Mannheim, VfB Stuttgart (A), SpVgg Ansbach and Borussia Fulda.

== Regionalliga Nord ==
=== Final table ===
Pos	Team	Pld	W	D	L	GF	GA	GD	Pts	Promotion or relegation
1	Erzgebirge Aue (C, P)	34	20	6	8	59	34	+25	66	Promotion to 2. Bundesliga
2	VfL Osnabrück (P)	34	19	8	7	56	29	+27	65	Promotion to 2. Bundesliga
3	Rot-Weiß Essen	34	16	12	6	56	33	+23	60	
4	SG Wattenscheid 09	34	16	8	10	66	48	+18	56	
5	Borussia Dortmund (A)	34	13	12	9	47	51	−4	51	
6	Werder Bremen (A)	34	13	11	10	59	53	+6	50	
7	Dynamo Dresden	34	13	11	10	34	34	0	50	
8	SC Paderborn 07	34	13	8	13	58	49	+9	47	
9	1. FC Köln (A)	34	12	9	13	52	55	−3	45	
10	KFC Uerdingen	34	13	6	15	43	51	−8	45	
11	Chemnitzer FC	34	12	8	14	47	55	−8	44	
12	Preußen Münster	34	12	7	15	45	55	−10	43	
13	Holstein Kiel	34	10	12	12	54	54	0	42	
14	Hamburger SV (A)	34	10	11	13	44	52	−8	41	
15	SC Verl (R)	34	12	4	18	47	65	−18	40	Relegation to Oberliga
16	SV Babelsberg 03 (R)	34	9	7	18	54	73	−19	34	Relegation to Oberliga
17	Bayer Leverkusen (A) (R)	34	9	6	19	46	59	−13	33	Relegation to Oberliga
18	Dresdner SC (R)	34	7	8	19	32	58	−26	29	Relegation to Oberliga

Source: Weltfussball.de
Rules for classification: 1) points; 2) goal difference; 3) number of goals scored.
(C) Champions; (P) Promoted; (R) Relegated

=== Top scorers ===
#	Player	Club	Goals
1.	(Lithuania) Dmitrijus Guščinas	Holstein Kiel	23
2.	(Turkey) Ersin Demir	Chemnitzer FC	18
2.	(Bulgaria) Veselin Petkov Gerov	SC Paderborn 07	18
4.	(Germany) Alexander Löbe	SG Wattenscheid 09	17
5.	(Turkey) Halil Altıntop	SG Wattenscheid 09	16
5.	(Germany) Achim Weber	Rot-Weiß Essen	16
7.	(Paraguay) Nelson Valdez	Werder Bremen (A)	15
8.	(Germany) Marco Antwerpen	Preußen Münster	14
9.	(Germany) Christian Claaßen	VfL Osnabrück	11
9.	(Germany) Ronny Jank	Erzgebirge Aue	11

== Regionalliga Süd ==
Five teams were due to be relegated, but Stuttgarter Kickers and Sportfreunde Siegen were reprieved because two of the relegated teams from the 2. Bundesliga, SSV Reutlingen and SV Waldhof Mannheim, could not achieve a Regionalliga license, and dropped another level, to the Oberliga.

=== Final table ===
Pos	Team	Pld	W	D	L	GF	GA	GD	Pts	Promotion or relegation
1	SpVgg Unterhaching (C, P)	36	22	7	7	75	34	+41	73	Promotion to 2. Bundesliga
2	Jahn Regensburg (P)	36	22	7	7	66	25	+41	73	Promotion to 2. Bundesliga
3	FC Augsburg	36	17	8	11	55	39	+16	59	
4	Bayern Munich (A)	36	16	9	11	51	35	+16	57	
5	TSG Hoffenheim	36	15	10	11	60	44	+16	55	
6	1. FC Saarbrücken (Note: 1. FC Saarbrücken were docked four points due to errors in the licensing process.)	36	15	12	9	43	38	+5	53	
7	SV Wehen	36	13	11	12	52	47	+5	50	
8	Kickers Offenbach	36	11	17	8	42	38	+4	50	
9	Rot-Weiß Erfurt	36	12	14	10	44	44	0	50	
10	VfR Aalen (Note: VfR Aalen were docked one point due to errors in the licensing process.)	36	14	6	16	48	55	−7	47	
11	SC Pfullendorf	36	13	8	15	51	61	−10	47	
12	1. FC Schweinfurt 05	36	13	6	17	56	64	−8	45	
13	1. FC Kaiserslautern (A)	36	11	12	13	43	47	−4	45	
14	SV Elversberg	36	11	12	13	38	51	−13	45	
15	Stuttgarter Kickers	36	11	12	13	40	43	−3	45	
16	Sportfreunde Siegen	36	11	10	15	47	55	−8	43	
17	SV Darmstadt 98 (R)	36	11	9	16	42	53	−11	42	Relegation to Oberliga
18	Eintracht Frankfurt (A) (R)	36	7	11	18	36	64	−28	32	Relegation to Oberliga
19	Borussia Neunkirchen (R)	36	3	9	24	23	74	−51	18	Relegation to Oberliga

Source: Weltfussball.de
Rules for classification: 1) points; 2) goal difference; 3) number of goals scored.
(C) Champions; (P) Promoted; (R) Relegated

=== Top scorers ===
#	Player	Club	Goals
1.	(Spain) Francisco Copado	SpVgg Unterhaching	24
2.	(Germany) Mark Römer	SC Pfullendorf	22
3.	(Serbia and Montenegro) Veselin Popović	1. FC Schweinfurt 05	20
4.	(Germany) Thomas Ollhoff	TSG Hoffenheim	19
5.	(Germany) Jörg Reeb	FC Augsburg	15
6.	(Germany) Christoph Teinert	TSG Hoffenheim	14
7.	(Senegal) Miguel Coulibaly	FC Augsburg	13
7.	(Bosnia and Herzegovina) Sead Mehić	SV Wehen	13
7.	(Croatia) Vlado Papić	Jahn Regensburg	13
7.	(Hungary) András Tölcséres	Jahn Regensburg	13
