= Regionalliga Nord =

- Organising body: Northern German Football Association
- Founded: 1994 (reformed in 2012)
- Country: Germany
- States: Lower Saxony; Schleswig-Holstein; Bremen; Hamburg
- Divisions: 1
- Number of clubs: 18
- Level on pyramid: Level 4
- Promotion to: 3. Liga
- Relegation to: Oberliga Hamburg; Bremen-Liga; Oberliga Schleswig-Holstein; Oberliga Niedersachsen
- Domestic cups: DFB-Pokal; Lower Saxony Cup; Schleswig-Holstein Cup; Bremen Cup; Hamburg Cup
- Current champions: SV Meppen (2025–26)
- Current: 2026–27 Regionalliga Nord

The Regionalliga Nord (English: Regional League North) is the fourth tier of the German football league system in the states of Lower Saxony, Schleswig-Holstein, Bremen and Hamburg. It is one of five leagues at this level, together with the Regionalliga Bayern, Regionalliga Nordost, Regionalliga Südwest and the Regionalliga West. Until the introduction of the 3. Liga in 2008 it was the third tier.

From 1963 to 1974, a Regionalliga Nord existed as the second tier of the German football league system, but it is not related to the current Regionalliga.

== Overview ==
The Regionalliga Nord was introduced in 1994 along with three other Regionalligas, those being:

- Regionalliga Süd
- Regionalliga Nordost
- Regionalliga West/Südwest

The reason for its introduction was to create a highest regional league for the north of Germany and to allow its champions, and some years the runners-up too, to be directly promoted to the 2nd Bundesliga. Prior to the introduction of the four Regionalligas, the leagues below the second division were the Oberligas, in which there was ten. Those ten Oberliga champions had to go through a promotion play-off rather than being directly promoted. The champions of the Regionalligas Nord and Nordost however had to play-off for a spot in the 2nd Bundesliga from 1996 to 2000. The winner of this contest was promoted, the loser faced the runners-ups of the Regionalligas Süd and West/Südwest for another spot in the second division.

The Regionalliga Nord was direct continuation of the Oberliga Nord, which was disbanded in 1994 in favour of the Regionalliga. Fourteen out of sixteen Oberliga Nord clubs qualified for the new league, only the bottom two teams were relegated to the two new Oberligas.

To replace the Oberliga Nord below the Regionalliga, two new leagues were formed, those being the Oberligas Niedersachsen/Bremen and Hamburg/Schleswig-Holstein. These two leagues were in turn disbanded in 2004 when the Oberliga Nord was reformed.

In 2001, Union Berlin of this league became only the second Regionalliga side to reach a German Cup final, losing 2−0 to Schalke 04.

With the league changes in Germany in 2008, the Oberliga Nord was again disbanded and the level below the Regionalliga Nord in this region were the five Verbandligas. This required a promotion play-off for this league winners as there were not five promotion spots available for their region. No changes were made in the NOFV region, where the two Oberligas Nord and Süd remained.

The following four teams were promoted to the Regionalliga from 2009:

- NOFV-Oberliga Nord champions
- NOFV-Oberliga Süd champions
- Lower Saxony champions, being the winner of the home-and-away series of the champions of the Oberliga Niedersachsen-West and Ost; since 2010 that Oberliga is a single division
- Winner of the promotion play-off for the champions of the Oberliga Hamburg, Bremen and Schleswig-Holstein, and the Oberliga Niedersachsen runners-up

== League history ==
=== Founding members ===
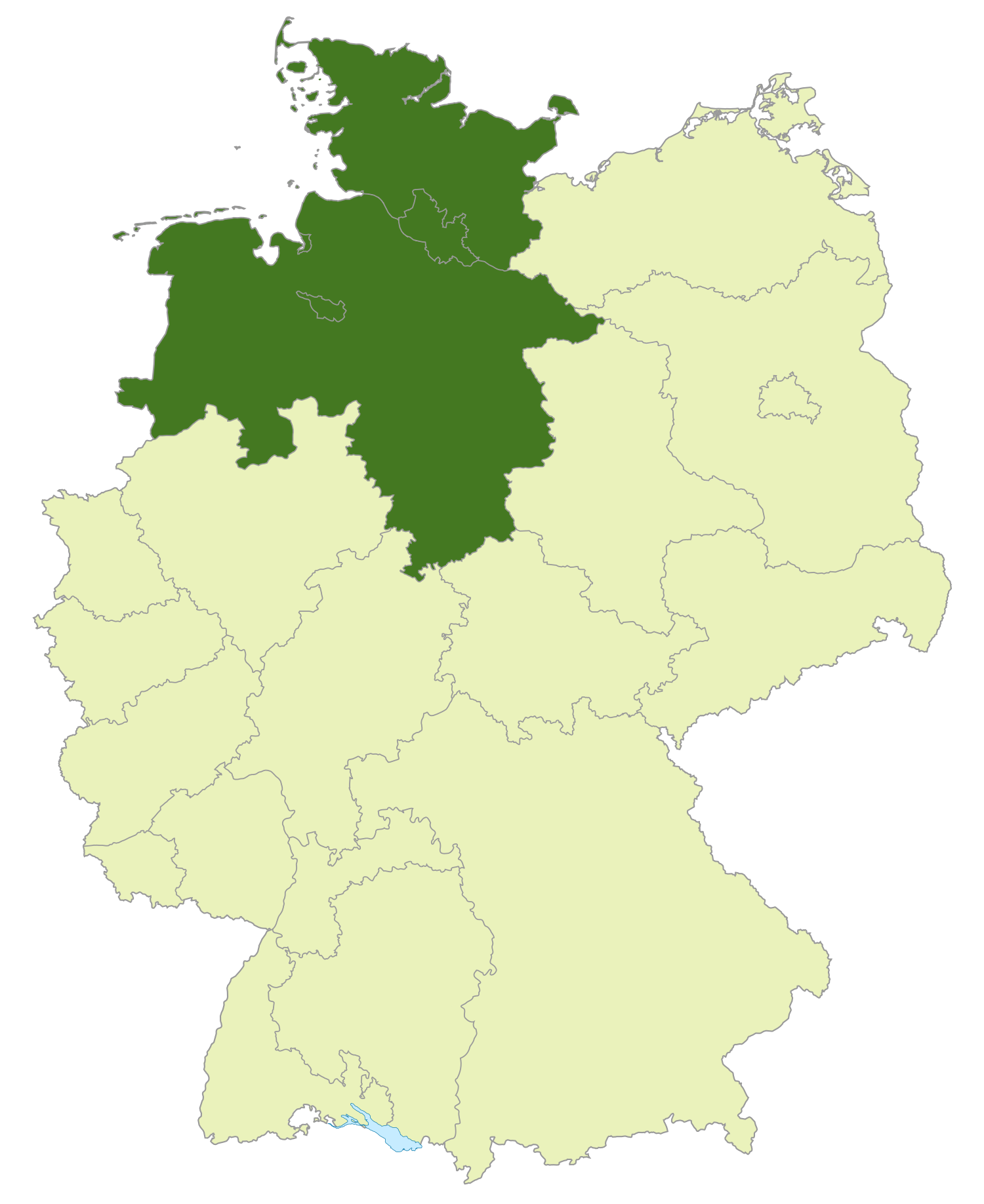
Map of Germany: Position of the Regionalliga Nord (1994–2000) highlighted

The Regionalliga Nord was formed in 1994 with 18 clubs, fourteen from the Oberliga Nord and one each from the Verbandsligas of Niedersachsen, Bremen, Hamburg and Schleswig-Holstein.

The founding members were:

From the Oberliga Nord:

- Kickers Emden
- Eintracht Braunschweig
- VfL Osnabrück
- VfL Herzlake
- TuS Hoisdorf
- VfB Oldenburg
- Holstein Kiel
- Werder Bremen II
- VfB Lübeck
- Hamburger SV II
- VfL 93 Hamburg
- TuS Celle
- 1. SC Göttingen 05
- SV Lurup

From the Verbandsliga Schleswig-Holstein:

- Lüneburger SK

From the Verbandsliga Hamburg:

- Concordia Hamburg

From the Verbandsliga Bremen:

- FC Bremerhaven

From the Verbandsliga Niedersachsen:

- SV Wilhelmshaven

The "new" Regionalliga Nord was actually a reformation of the "old" Regionalliga Nord which operated from 1963 to 1974 in the same region but then as the second tier of German football. Unlike the "old" Regionalliga, the new one allowed reserve teams to compete in it.

=== Expansion of the league in 2000 ===
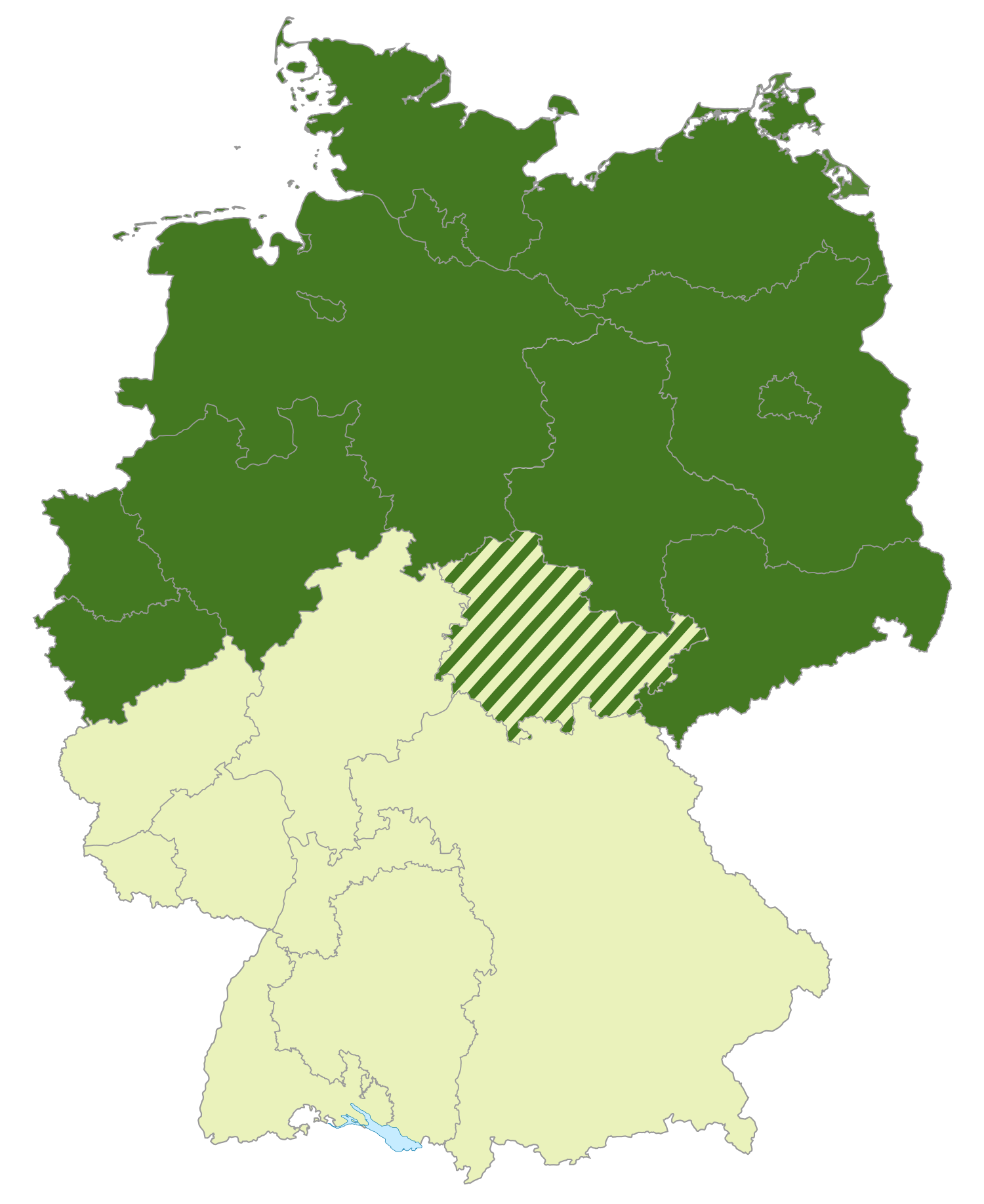
Map of Germany: Position of the Regionalliga Nord (2000–2008) highlighted

After six seasons, in 2000, the number of Regionalligas was reduced from four to two. Only the Regionalligas Süd and Nord survived. The clubs of the other two were spread according to their geographical location.

Only the teams placed two to six were permitted to remain in the league. The league champion, VfL Osnabrück, was promoted to the 2nd Bundesliga and all clubs from place seven to eighteen were relegated to the Verbandsligas. The league was expanded to nineteen teams and fourteen clubs from the 2nd Bundesliga, Regionalliga West/Südwest and Regionalliga Nordost were admitted.

Remaining in the Regionalliga Nord:

- VfB Lübeck
- Eintracht Braunschweig
- SV Wilhelmshaven
- Werder Bremen II
- Lüneburger SK

Relegated from the 2nd Bundesliga:

- SC Fortuna Köln
- Tennis Borussia Berlin

Admitted from the Regionalliga West/Südwest:

- Preußen Münster
- SC Verl
- SG Wattenscheid 09
- KFC Uerdingen 05
- Rot-Weiß Essen
- Fortuna Düsseldorf
- Borussia Dortmund II

Admitted from the Regionalliga Nordost:

- Union Berlin
- Babelsberg 03
- Erzgebirge Aue
- Dresdner SC
- FC Sachsen Leipzig

=== The league reform in 2008 ===
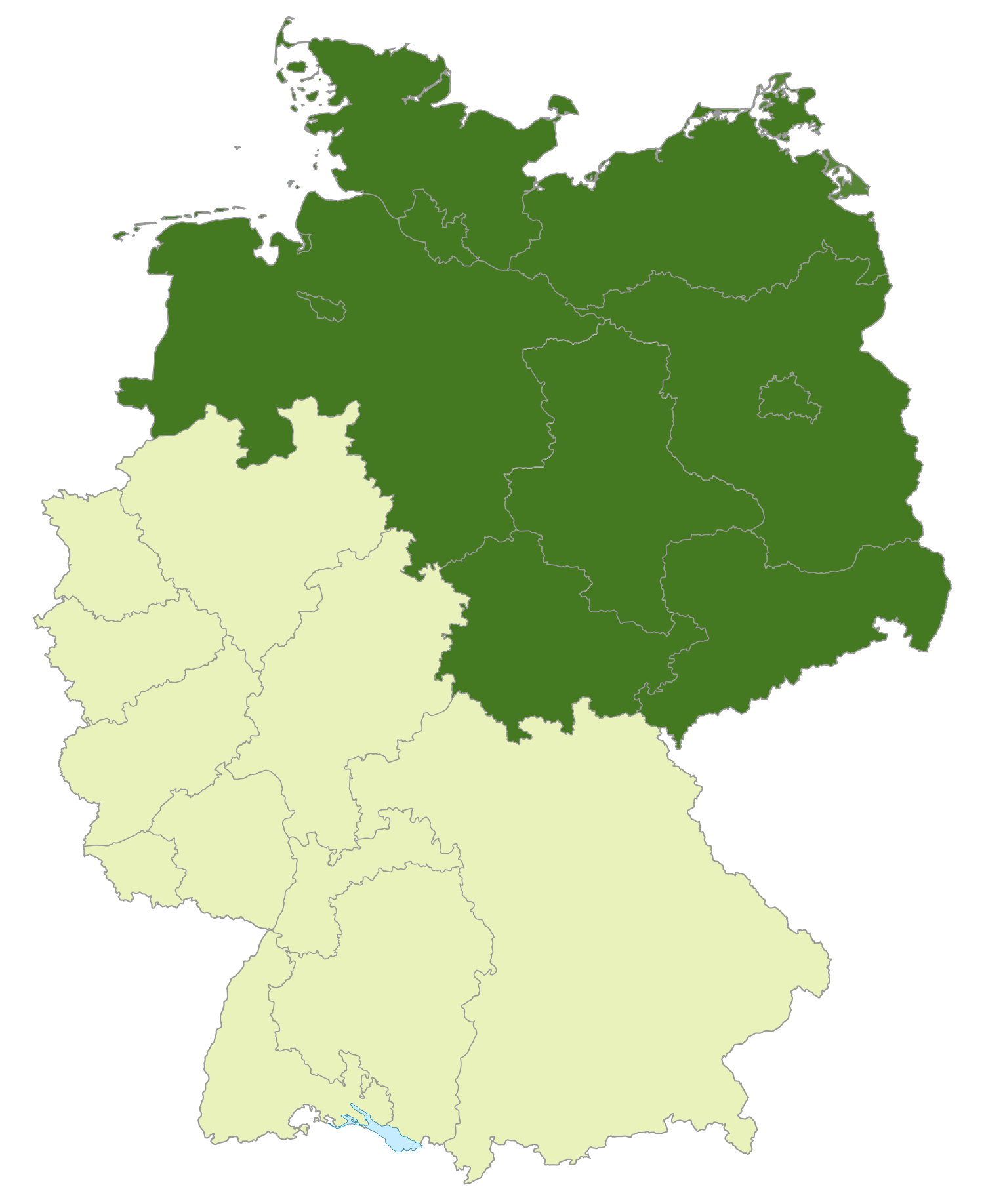
Map of Germany: Position of the Regionalliga Nord highlighted

With the introduction of the 3. Liga in 2008 and of a third Regionalliga, the Regionalliga West, the league became the fourth tier of German football. The clubs from North Rhine-Westphalia left the league again and joined the new Regionalliga West.

The make up of the leagues was:

- Winner and runners-up of the Regionalliga Nord qualified for the 2nd Bundesliga (unless they are reserve teams)
- Clubs placed third to tenth went to the new 3. Liga (only the two best placed reserve teams were admitted)
- Clubs placed eleventh to eighteen remained in the Regionalligas (clubs from North Rhine-Westphalia left for the Regionalliga West)
- The five best teams from the Oberliga Nord joined the Regionalliga. The sixth placed team played-off with the five Verbandsliga winners from this region for one more place in the Regionalliga.
- The three best teams from the NOFV-Oberliga Nord and Süd each and a play-off winner of the two fourth placed teams.

The following 18 teams fulfilled the various qualification criteria and were granted a license for play in the new Regionalliga Nord for the 2008–09 season.

Remaining in the Regionalliga Nord:

- 1. FC Magdeburg
- Hamburger SV II
- Babelsberg 03
- Energie Cottbus II
- VfB Lübeck
- VfL Wolfsburg II

From the Oberliga Nord:

- Holstein Kiel
- SV Wilhelmshaven
- FC Altona 93
- Hannover 96 II
- FC Oberneuland (as play-off winner)

From the NOFV-Oberliga Nord:

- Hertha BSC Berlin II
- Hansa Rostock II
- Türkiyemspor Berlin

From the NOFV-Oberliga Süd:

- Chemnitzer FC
- Hallescher FC
- VFC Plauen
- Sachsen Leipzig (as play-off winner)

=== The league reform in 2012 ===
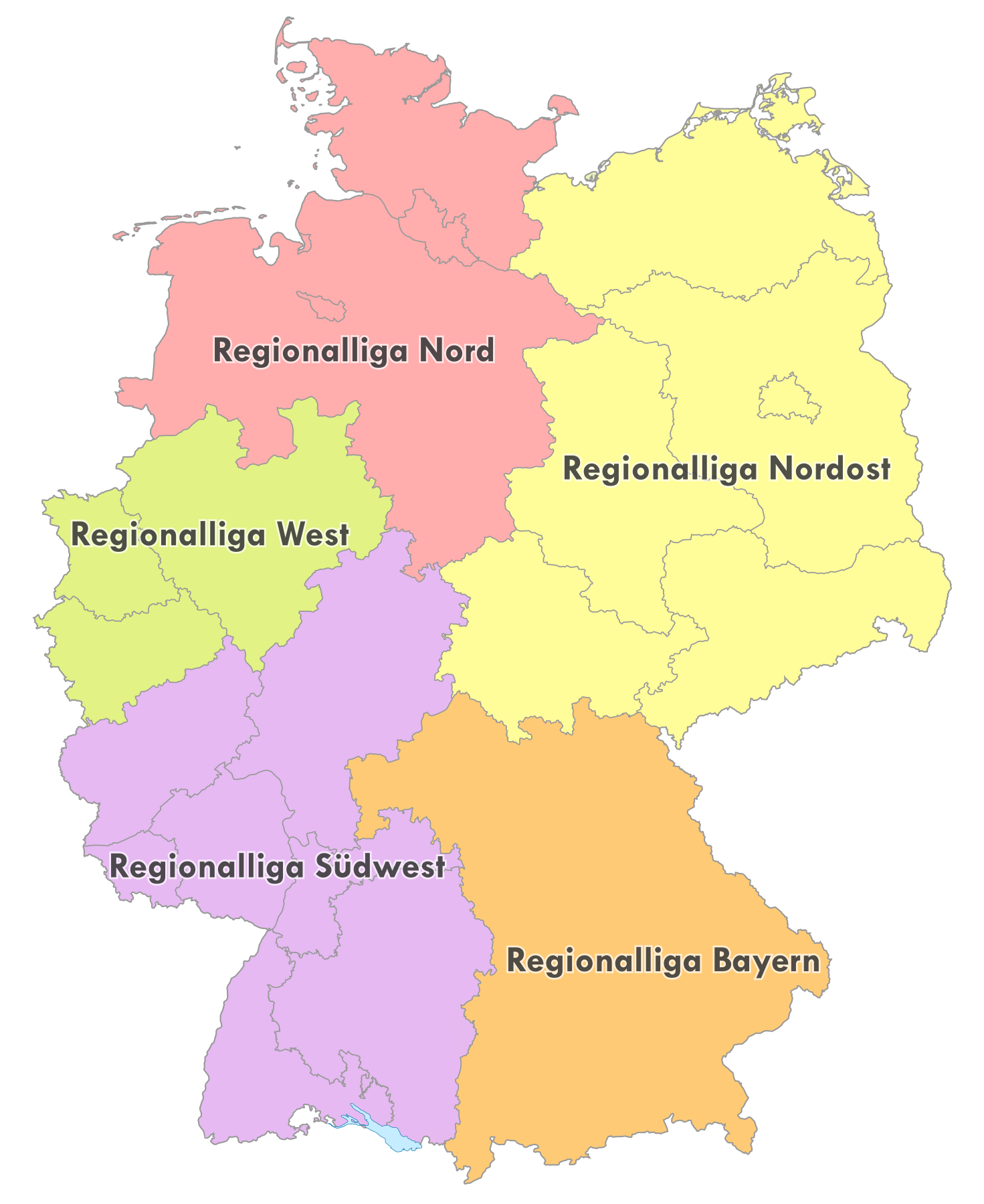
The Regionalligas from 2012 onwards.

In October 2010, another reform of the Regionalligas expanded the number of leagues to five, with the Nordost clubs leaving the Regionalliga Nord to form their own Regionalliga Nordost once more. The new system came into operation in the 2012–13 season. It was also decided to limit the number of reserve teams per Regionalliga to seven.

=== The league reform in 2019 ===
As four teams were relegated from the 3. Liga at the end of the 2018–19 season, the champions of the Regionalliga Nordost, Regionalliga Südwest and Regionalliga West were promoted directly to the 3. Liga and the remaining two champions, VfL Wolfsburg II of the Regionalliga Nord and Bayern Munich II of the Regionalliga Bayern, played a two-legged promotion play-off for the last promotion spot, which was won by Bayern Munich II. In 2020, the three direct promotion spots went to the champions of the Regionalliga Südwest, Regionalliga Nord and Regionalliga Bayern, while the Nordost and the West champions participated in the play-off. This format was installed initially as a temporary solution until the DFB-Bundestag in September 2019 decided on a format that could have enabled all Regionalliga champions to be promoted. On that date, the Bundestag delegates voted to grant the Südwest and West champions two direct promotions indefinitely from 2021, with the third direct promotion place rotating between the Regionalliga Nord, Nordost and Bavarian champions. The representatives from the two remaining Regionalligen enter a two-legged play-offs to determine the fourth promotion place.

== Winners and runners-up of the Regionalliga Nord ==
The winners and runners-up of the league:

Season	Winner	Runner-up
1994–95	**VfB Lübeck**	VfL Osnabrück
1995–96	**VfB Oldenburg**	Eintracht Braunschweig
1996–97	Hannover 96	Eintracht Braunschweig
1997–98	**Hannover 96**	Eintracht Braunschweig
1998–99	VfL Osnabrück	VfB Lübeck
1999–2000	**VfL Osnabrück**	VfB Lübeck
2000–01	**Union Berlin**	**Babelsberg 03**
2001–02	**VfB Lübeck**	**Eintracht Braunschweig**
2002–03	**Erzgebirge Aue**	**VfL Osnabrück**
2003–04	**Rot-Weiß Essen**	**Dynamo Dresden**
2004–05	**Eintracht Braunschweig**	**SC Paderborn**
2005–06	**Rot-Weiß Essen**	**Carl Zeiss Jena**
2006–07	**FC St Pauli**	**VfL Osnabrück**
2007–08	**Rot-Weiß Ahlen**	**Rot-Weiß Oberhausen**
2008–09	**Holstein Kiel**	Hallescher FC
2009–10	**Babelsberg 03**	VfL Wolfsburg II
2010–11	**Chemnitzer FC**	VfL Wolfsburg II
2011–12	**Hallescher FC**	Holstein Kiel
2012–13	**Holstein Kiel**	TSV Havelse
2013–14	VfL Wolfsburg II	Werder Bremen II
2014–15	**Werder Bremen II**	VfL Wolfsburg II
2015–16	VfL Wolfsburg II	VfB Oldenburg
2016–17	**SV Meppen**	Weiche Flensburg
2017–18	Weiche Flensburg	Hamburger SV II
2018–19	VfL Wolfsburg II	VfB Lübeck
2019–20^{a}	**VfB Lübeck**	VfL Wolfsburg II
2020–21^{b}	Not completed	
2021–22	**VfB Oldenburg**	Weiche Flensburg
2022–23	**VfB Lübeck**	Hamburger SV II
2023–24	**Hannover 96 II**	SV Meppen
2024–25	**TSV Havelse**	Kickers Emden
2025–26	**SV Meppen**	SV Drochtersen/Assel

Source: "Regionalliga Nord". Das deutsche Fussball-Archiv.

- Promoted teams in **bold**.

^{a} Season abandoned in June 2020, with final standings decided on a points-per-game basis.

^{b} Season abandoned in April 2021 with Weiche Flensburg leading the north division and Werder Bremen II leading the south division. TSV Havelse were nominated for the promotion play-offs.

== League statistics ==
The top goalscorers and attendance figures for the league are:

Season	Total attendance	Average attendance	Best supported club	Average attendance	Top scorer	Goals
1994–95	492,629	1,610	Eintracht Braunschweig	4,351	Christian Classen (SVW)	26
1995–96	438,798	1,434	Eintracht Braunschweig	4,854	Hakan Cengiz (AD)	21
1996–97	587,484	1,920	Hannover 96	9,789	Hakan Cengiz (VfLH)	28
1997–98	680,620	2,224	Eintracht Braunschweig	9,181	Markus Erdmann (AH)	34
1998–99	642,357	2,099	Eintracht Braunschweig	7,456	Daniel Bärwolf (VfB)	26
1999–2000	710,524	2,322	VfL Osnabrück	9,347	Daniel Bärwolf (VfB); Marinus Bester (LSK)	25
2000–01	1,108,917	3,242	Eintracht Braunschweig	9,993	Daniel Teixeira (1. FCU)	32
2001–02	1,152,064	3,764	Eintracht Braunschweig	11,921	Veselin Gerov (SCP); Daniel Teixeira (EB)	19
2002–03	936,297	3,060	Rot-Weiss Essen	9,482	Dmitrijus Guščinas (HK)	23
2003–04	1,472,089	4,811	FC St. Pauli	17,335	Markus Feldhoff (KFC)	22
2004–05	1,547,950	4,526	FC St. Pauli	16,144	Ahmet Kuru (EB)	24
2005–06	1,577,563	4,613	FC St. Pauli	17,296	Thomas Reichenberger (VfL)	17
2006–07	1,823,720	5,333	FC St. Pauli	16,775	Thomas Reichenberger (VfL); Massimo Cannizzaro (HSV)	17
2007–08	1,863,662	5,449	Eintracht Braunschweig	14,889	Mahir Saglik (WSV)	27
2008–09	529,200	1,729	1. FC Magdeburg	8,626	Wojciech Pollok (SVW)	22
2009–10	373,460	1,220	1. FC Magdeburg	5,491	Daniel Frahn (SVB)	29
2010–11	447,721	1,463	1. FC Magdeburg	4,586	Benjamin Förster (CFC)	25
2011–12	530,449	1,733	RB Leipzig	7,401	Daniel Frahn (RBL)	26
2012–13	234,898	816	Holstein Kiel	3,628	Rogier Krohne (BVC)	24
2013–14	184,493	603	SV Meppen	1,825	Addy-Waku Menga (VfB)	25
2014–15	220,635	721	VfB Lübeck	1,723	Ahmet Arslan (HSV)	19
2015–16	229,239	726	VfB Oldenburg	2,201	Dino Međedović (WOL)	23
2016–17	216,199	707	SV Meppen	2,645	Benjamin Girth (MEP)	20
2017–18	186,006	606	VfB Lübeck	1,426	Törles Knöll (HSV)	20
2018–19	187,623	613	VfB Lübeck	2,152	Daniel Hanslik (WOL)	19
2019–20	167,053	792	VfB Lübeck	3,114	Ahmet Arslan (LÜB)	16
2020–21	31,551	322	VfB Oldenburg	688	Eren Dinkçi (WB2)	7

League record

== Placings in the Regionalliga Nord ==
=== Current extent of league ===
Final league positions for clubs from the region currently covered by the league:

Club	95	96	97	98	99	00	01	02	03	04	05	06	07	08	09	10	11	12	13	14	15	16	17	18	19	20	21	22	23	24	25
FC St. Pauli	2B	B	B	2B	2B	2B	2B	B	2B	8	7	6	1	2B	2B	2B	B	2B	2B	2B	2B	2B	2B	2B	2B	2B	2B	2B	2B	2B	B
Holstein Kiel	11	18			14	8		13	13	12	9	4	15		1	3L	6	2	1	3L	3L	3L	3L	2B	2B	2B	2B	2B	2B	2B	B
Hannover 96	2B	2B	1	1	2B	2B	2B	2B	B	B	B	B	B	B	B	B	B	B	B	B	B	B	2B	B	B	2B	2B	2B	2B	2B	2B
Eintracht Braunschweig	6	2	2	2	3	3	8	2	2B	6	1	2B	2B	10	3L	3L	3L	2B	2B	B	2B	2B	2B	2B	3L	3L	2B	3L	2B	2B	2B
VfL Osnabrück	2	5	4	3	1	1	2B	7	2	2B	4	10	2	2B	2B	3L	2B	3L	3L	3L	3L	3L	3L	3L	3L	2B	2B	3L	3L	2B	3L
Hannover 96 II															6	8	9	6	4	11	14	12	11	8	6	12	6s	9	3	1	3L
TSV Havelse																	15	5	2	7	4	6	6	11	11	9	2s	3L	6	8	1
Kickers Emden	4	4	9	8	16							9	4	9	3L														19		2
SV Drochtersen/Assel																						4	9	12	5	4	3n	14	8	4	3
Werder Bremen II	7	15	3	4	4	5	15	10	6	5	14	12	8	5	3L	3L	3L	3L	5	2	1	3L	3L	3L	3	6	1s	3	15		4
1. FC Phönix Lübeck																											4n	11	13	3	5
SV Meppen	2B	2B	2B	2B	11	11												12	11	4	8	5	1	3L	3L	3L	3L	3L	3L	2	6
VfB Lübeck	1	2B	2B	7	2	2	3	1	2B	2B	3	3	9	16	8	9	3	11	18^{i}		7	7	4	4	2	1	3L	5	1	3L	7
Hamburger SV II	14	6	5	14	15	16			14	9	6	13	6	17	13	5	8	8	14	14	3	14	5	2	7	14	7n	6	2	7	8
Blau-Weiß Lohne																													9	10	9
FC St. Pauli II		7	16			15										17		17	13	9	9	15	14	6	14	13	6n	16	7	12	10
VfB Oldenburg	5	1	2B	5	9	18													10	3	10	2	8	13	9	8	4s	1	3L	5	11
Eintracht Norderstedt		13	7	16	12	12														10	6	11	7	9	13	5	2n	12	10	13	12
Weiche Flensburg																			7	6	5	3	2	1	4	3	1n	2	5	15	13
SSV Jeddeloh																								7	12	15	5s	13	11	14	14
Bremer SV																													14	11	15
FC Teutonia Ottensen																											5n	7	4	9	16
Holstein Kiel II																									10	7	9n	4	12	6	17
SV Todesfelde																															18
Eimsbütteler TV																														16	
Kilia Kiel																														17	
SC Spelle-Venhaus																														18	
Schwarz-Weiß Rehden																			9	8	11	8	16	15	8	10	3s	15	16		
VfV 06 Hildesheim																						10	15	16			10s	10	17		
Atlas Delmenhorst (2012)																											11s	8	18		
Lüneburger SK Hansa																					12	13	13	10	15	11	8n	17			
Hannoverscher SC																										18	10s	18			
FC Altona 93			15												16									18		16	11n	19			
FC Oberneuland															9	16	17		17^{i}									20			
Heider SV																										17	10n	21			
VfL Wolfsburg II											17			19	5	2	2	4	3	1	2	1	3	3	1	2	9s^{k}				
Germania Egestorf																							10	5	16						
VfL Oldenburg																									17						
Lupo Martini Wolfsburg																							17		18						
Eintracht Braunschweig II																	16			13	13	9	12	14^{j}							
Eutin 08																								17							
SV Eichede																				17			18								
Goslarer SC 08																18			8	5	15	16									
BV Cloppenburg		17		10	7										RL				12	12	16	17									
TSV Schilksee																						18									
VfR Neumünster										18									6	15	17										
FT Braunschweig																					18										
SV Wilhelmshaven	9	10	13	9	7	4	10^{b}						19		11	14	13	13	16	16											
SC Victoria Hamburg																			15	18											
Lüneburger SK	8	8	17		6	6	17																								
1. SC Göttingen 05	16		10	18		9																									
SV Arminia Hannover				6	13	10																									
Eintracht Nordhorn				10	5	13																									
TuS Celle	13	3	6	12	6	14																									
FC Bremerhaven	17					17																									
VfL Herzlake	3	9	8	15	17																										
Sportfreunde Ricklingen			11	13	18																										
VfL 93 Hamburg	12	16		11^{f}																											
Atlas Delmenhorst (1973)		14	12	17																											
Concordia Hamburg	15	12	14																												
SV Lurup	10	11	18																												
TuS Hoisdorf	18																														

=== Former extent of league ===
Final league positions for clubs from the regions formerly covered by the league:

Club	95	96	97	98	99	00	01	02	03	04	05	06	07	08	09	10	11	12	13	14	15	16	17	18	19	20	21	22	23	24	25
RB Leipzig ^{‡}																	4	3	RL	3L	2B	2B	B	B	B	B	B	B	B	B	B
Union Berlin ^{‡}	RL	RL	RL	RL	RL	RL	1	2B	2B	2B	19		12	4	3L	2B	2B	2B	2B	2B	2B	2B	2B	2B	2B	B	B	B	B	B	B
Fortuna Düsseldorf ^{†}	2B	B	B	2B	2B	RL	16	17			8	5	10	3	3L	2B	2B	2B	B	2B	2B	2B	2B	2B	B	B	2B	2B	2B	2B	2B
SC Paderborn ^{†}	RL	RL	RL	RL	RL	RL		14	8	3	2	2B	2B	2B	3L	2B	2B	2B	2B	2B	B	2B	3L	3L	2B	B	2B	2B	2B	2B	2B
1. FC Magdeburg ^{‡}				RL	RL	RL		12^{a}					3	11	4	6	12	18	RL	RL	RL	3L	3L	3L	2B	3L	3L	3L	2B	2B	2B
Preußen Münster ^{†}	RL	RL	RL	RL	RL	RL	5	15	12	13	11	15			RL	RL	RL	3L	3L	3L	3L	3L	3L	3L	3L	3L	RL	RL	RL	3L	2B
Erzgebirge Aue ^{‡}	RL	RL	RL	RL	RL	RL	7	9	1	2B	2B	2B	2B	2B	3L	3L	2B	2B	2B	2B	2B	3L	2B	2B	2B	2B	2B	2B	3L	3L	3L
Dynamo Dresden ^{‡}	B	RL	RL	RL	RL	RL			7	2	2B	2B	7	8	3L	3L	3L	2B	2B	2B	3L	3L	2B	2B	2B	2B	3L	2B	3L	3L	3L
SC Verl ^{†}	RL	RL	RL	RL	RL	RL	6	11	15					18	RL	RL	RL	RL	RL	RL	RL	RL	RL	RL	RL	RL	3L	3L	3L	3L	3L
Borussia Dortmund II ^{†}					RL	RL	18		5	10	16		14	13	RL	3L	RL	RL	3L	3L	3L	RL	RL	RL	RL	RL	RL	3L	3L	3L	3L
Rot-Weiß Essen ^{†}	RL	RL	2B	RL		RL	13	3	3	1	2B	1	2B	12	RL	RL		RL	RL	RL	RL	RL	RL	RL	RL	RL	RL	RL	3L	3L	3L
Hallescher FC ^{‡}															2	4	5	1	3L	3L	3L	3L	3L	3L	3L	3L	3L	3L	3L	3L	RL
Carl Zeiss Jena ^{‡}	RL	2B	2B	2B	RL	RL	RL					2	2B	2B	3L	3L	3L	3L	RL	RL	RL	RL	RL	3L	3L	3L	RL	RL	RL	RL	RL
Chemnitzer FC ^{‡}	2B	2B	RL	RL	RL	2B	2B	6	11	11	15	19			7	3	1	3L	3L	3L	3L	3L	3L	3L	RL	3L	RL	RL	RL	RL	RL
Fortuna Köln ^{†}	2B	2B	2B	2B	2B	2B	4	18										RL	RL	RL	3L	3L	3L	3L	RL	RL	RL	RL	RL	RL	RL
Babelsberg 03 ^{‡}				RL	RL	RL	2	2B	16					15	3	1	3L	3L	3L	RL	RL	RL	RL	RL	RL	RL	RL	RL	RL	RL	RL
Rot-Weiß Oberhausen ^{†}		RL	RL	RL	2B	2B	2B	2B	2B	2B	2B	17		2	2B	2B	2B	3L	RL	RL	RL	RL	RL	RL	RL	RL	RL	RL	RL	RL	RL
ZFC Meuselwitz ^{‡}																10	11	9	RL	RL	RL	RL	RL	RL	RL	RL	RL	RL	RL	RL	RL
Hertha BSC Berlin II ^{‡}	RL	RL				RL					13	7	18		12	11	7	14	RL	RL	RL	RL	RL	RL	RL	RL	RL	RL	RL	RL	RL
Borussia Mönchengladbach II ^{†}													16		RL	RL	RL	RL	RL	RL	RL	RL	RL	RL	RL	RL	RL	RL	RL	RL	RL
1. FC Köln II ^{†}									9	14	12	18			RL	RL	RL	RL	RL	RL	RL	RL	RL	RL	RL	RL	RL	RL	RL	RL	RL
Wuppertaler SV ^{†}	RL	RL	RL	RL	RL					4	5	8	5	6	3L	3L	RL	RL	RL				RL	RL	RL	RL	RL	RL	RL	RL	RL
FC Schalke 04 II ^{†}										16					RL	RL	RL	RL	RL	RL	RL	RL	RL			RL	RL	RL	RL	RL	RL
Rot-Weiß Erfurt ^{‡}	RL	RL	RL	RL	RL	RL	RL	RL	RL	RL	2B	14	11	7	3L	3L	3L	3L	3L	3L	3L	3L	3L	3L	3L	RL			RL	RL	RL
KFC Uerdingen ^{†}	B	B	2B	2B	2B	RL	12	5	10	7	10^{e}									RL	RL			RL	3L	3L	3L	RL			RL
VFC Plauen ^{‡}			RL	RL	RL	RL									14	7	14	10	RL	RL	RL										RL
Berliner AK 07 ^{‡}																		7	RL	RL	RL	RL	RL	RL	RL	RL	RL	RL	RL	RL	
Rot-Weiß Ahlen ^{†}			RL	RL	RL	RL	2B	2B	2B	2B	2B	2B	13	1	2B	2B	3L					RL	RL				RL	RL	RL	RL	
Germania Halberstadt ^{‡}																		16	RL	RL	RL	RL		RL	RL	RL	RL	RL	RL		
Tennis Borussia Berlin ^{‡}	RL	RL	RL	RL	2B	2B	19									15^{g}											RL	RL	RL		
SG Wattenscheid 09 ^{†}	2B	2B	RL	2B	2B	RL	11	4	4	15		16								RL	RL	RL	RL	RL	RL	RL			RL		
Bayer Leverkusen II ^{†}					RL	RL		8	17			11	17		RL	RL	RL	RL	RL	RL											
Energie Cottbus II ^{‡}														14	18		10	15	RL												
Türkiyemspor Berlin ^{‡}															15^{c}	13	18														
Arminia Bielefeld II ^{†}											18						RL														
Hansa Rostock II ^{‡}															10	12^{h}															
FC Sachsen Leipzig ^{‡}	RL	RL	RL	RL	RL	RL	14^{d}			17					17																
Dresdner SC ^{‡}					RL	RL	9	16	18																						

Source: "Regionalliga Nord". Das deutsche Fussball-Archiv.

=== Key ===
Symbol	Key
B	Bundesliga
2B	2. Bundesliga
3L	3. Liga
1	League champions
Place	League
Blank	Played at a league level below this league
n	Northern section
s	Southern section
RL	Played in one of the other Regionalligas
†	Denotes club from North Rhine-Westphalia which is not part of the league anymore after 2008.
‡	Denotes club from the northeast region which is not part of the league anymore after 2012.

=== Notes ===
^{a} In 2002, 1. FC Magdeburg were refused a licence for the Regionalliga.
^{b} In 2001, SV Wilhelmshaven was refused a licence for the Regionalliga.
^{c} In 2009, Türkiyemspor Berlin avoided relegation after Kickers Emden withdrew from the 3. Liga.
^{d} In 2001, FC Sachsen Leipzig was refused a licence for the Regionalliga.
^{e} In 2005, KFC Uerdingen was refused a licence for the Regionalliga.
^{f} In 1998, VfL Hamburg 93 withdrew their team from the league.
^{g} Tennis Borussia Berlin declared insolvency on 21 May 2010 and was automatically relegated.
^{h} Hansa Rostock II withdrew from the league in 2010 for financial reasons.
^{i} VfB Lübeck and FC Oberneuland declared insolvency in 2013 and were relegated from the league.
^{j} Eintracht Braunschweig II was relegated to the Oberliga in 2018 following the first team's relegation from the 2. Bundesliga, sparing Schwarz-Weiß Rehden from relegation.
^{k} In 2021, VfL Wolfsburg II withdrew their team from the league.
