= 2001–02 Regionalliga =

8th season of the Regionalliga as a third-level league

Regionalliga
- Season: 2001–02
- Promoted: VfB Lübeck; Eintracht Braunschweig; SV Wacker Burghausen; SV Eintracht Trier 05
- Relegated: 1. FC Magdeburg; Fortuna Düsseldorf; SC Fortuna Köln; VfR Mannheim; VfB Stuttgart II; SpVgg Ansbach; Borussia Fulda

The 2001–02 Regionalliga season was the eighth season of the Regionalliga at tier three of the German football league system.

The Regionalliga was split into two divisions, the Regionalliga Nord and the Regionalliga Süd. The champions of each, VfB Lübeck and SV Wacker Burghausen, were promoted to the 2002–03 2. Bundesliga, along with the runners-up Eintracht Braunschweig and SV Eintracht Trier.

== Regionalliga Nord ==
VfB Lübeck won the Nord division and was promoted to the 2. Bundesliga along with runners-up Eintracht Braunschweig. Fortuna Düsseldorf, Fortuna Köln and 1. FC Magdeburg were relegated to the Oberliga.

=== Standings ===
Pos	Team	Pld	W	D	L	GF	GA	GD	Pts	Promotion or relegation
1	VfB Lübeck (C, P)	34	20	5	9	70	46	+24	65	Promotion to 2. Bundesliga
2	Eintracht Braunschweig (Note: Werder Bremen II vs Eintracht Braunschweig (Day 12, 1–1) was awarded as 2–0 win to Braunschweig) (P)	34	19	7	8	60	29	+31	64	Promotion to 2. Bundesliga
3	Rot-Weiss Essen (Note: Rot-Weiss Essen were docked one point.)	34	18	10	6	58	33	+25	63	
4	SG Wattenscheid 09	34	17	7	10	64	51	+13	58	
5	KFC Uerdingen	34	14	11	9	49	41	+8	53	
6	Chemnitzer FC	34	15	6	13	53	40	+13	51	
7	VfL Osnabrück	34	13	11	10	46	35	+11	50	
8	Bayer Leverkusen II	34	14	7	13	53	59	−6	49	
9	Erzgebirge Aue	34	13	9	12	47	43	+4	48	
10	Werder Bremen II	34	12	10	12	50	51	−1	46	
11	SC Verl	34	12	9	13	57	61	−4	45	
12	1. FC Magdeburg (Note: 1. FC Magdeburg were not granted a license for the next season.) (R)	34	11	10	13	54	54	0	43	Relegation to Oberliga
13	Holstein Kiel	34	10	12	12	36	51	−15	42	
14	SC Paderborn	34	11	7	16	51	60	−9	40	
15	Preußen Münster	34	11	4	19	49	68	−19	37	
16	Dresdner SC	34	9	5	20	41	60	−19	32	
17	Fortuna Düsseldorf (R)	34	8	8	18	36	57	−21	32	Relegation to Oberliga
18	Fortuna Köln (R)	34	6	8	20	33	68	−35	26	Relegation to Oberliga

Source: fussballdaten.de
Rules for classification: 1) points; 2) goal difference; 3) number of goals scored.
(C) Champions; (P) Promoted; (R) Relegated

=== Results ===
Home \ Away	LÜB	BRA	ESS	WAT	UER	CHE	OSN	LEV	AUE	WER	VER	MAG	KIE	PAD	MÜN	DRE	DÜS	KÖL
VfB Lübeck		1–0	0–3	1–1	1–1	2–1	2–0	2–1	4–1	3–1	0–2	4–1	1–1	3–2	4–1	1–2	3–1	2–0
Eintracht Braunschweig	2–0		0–0	2–1	1–0	2–0	0–0	4–0	3–0	3–0	3–1	1–0	3–0	3–0	3–0	4–1	1–2	2–2
Rot-Weiss Essen	0–1	3–1		4–0	0–0	3–2	0–0	1–1	1–0	4–2	3–3	5–1	1–0	2–1	1–2	3–0	1–1	1–1
SG Wattenscheid 09	5–3	1–1	0–2		1–0	3–0	1–1	1–2	2–1	2–1	3–1	0–1	5–2	3–1	1–0	5–4	2–0	1–1
KFC Uerdingen	1–1	1–1	1–1	2–4		1–0	3–1	1–2	1–0	1–1	0–2	0–2	0–0	5–0	1–1	3–0	1–0	2–1
Chemnitzer FC	1–0	2–0	5–0	5–0	4–4		1–1	2–1	0–2	3–1	3–1	1–0	1–1	1–3	2–1	1–2	1–0	3–1
VfL Osnabrück	2–0	0–0	2–1	2–1	2–0	0–2		2–1	1–2	1–1	5–1	3–0	1–1	2–0	2–0	4–0	1–1	0–2
Bayer Leverkusen Amateure	1–1	1–0	1–3	1–4	1–2	3–1	1–1		2–1	1–1	3–2	2–1	1–1	2–1	4–2	1–1	1–4	5–2
FC Erzgebirge Aue	1–4	2–1	1–0	2–5	3–0	0–3	1–1	2–0		4–0	1–1	2–0	2–0	2–1	3–0	0–0	2–2	4–0
SV Werder Bremen Amateure	3–5	0–2	1–1	0–0	1–2	2–0	1–0	1–1	0–0		3–3	0–0	4–1	0–2	4–0	2–1	2–0	2–0
SC Verl	2–1	1–1	0–1	2–4	2–1	1–1	2–1	3–2	0–0	1–3		3–3	2–0	1–2	2–1	4–2	0–1	2–0
1. FC Magdeburg	2–3	1–2	1–3	2–1	2–2	0–0	2–0	0–3	1–1	2–2	3–3		2–0	3–1	1–1	1–0	0–0	7–1
Holstein Kiel	2–5	0–4	0–2	0–0	2–2	2–1	0–0	1–2	1–1	1–0	1–0	3–2		1–1	0–0	2–1	2–0	2–1
SC Paderborn 07	1–2	3–1	3–1	3–2	2–3	0–1	2–1	4–1	1–1	2–3	2–3	1–6	2–0		4–1	1–0	1–1	1–1
Preußen Münster	1–4	4–2	1–3	2–2	0–2	1–0	1–3	0–1	1–4	1–3	0–2	4–1	0–1	2–1		3–1	2–0	6–2
Dresdner SC	3–2	0–1	0–2	1–2	0–2	1–0	0–2	5–1	2–1	3–0	1–1	2–2	3–4	0–0	0–2		3–1	0–1
Fortuna Düsseldorf	0–3	2–3	1–1	1–0	1–2	0–4	4–1	0–3	3–0	0–2	3–2	0–2	0–3	1–1	3–4	1–0		0–0
Fortuna Köln	0–1	0–3	0–1	0–1	1–2	1–1	1–3	2–0	2–0	1–3	3–1	0–2	1–1	1–1	1–4	0–2	3–2	

Legend: Blue = home team win; Yellow = draw; Red = away team win.

=== Top scorers ===
	Player	Club	Goals
1	(Brazil) Daniel Teixeira	Eintracht Braunschweig	19
1	(Bulgaria) Vesselin Petkov Gerov	SC Paderborn 07	19
3	(Germany) Tino Milde	SC Verl	18
4	(Nigeria) Abdul Iyodo	SG Wattenscheid 09	15
5	(Turkey) Halil Altıntop	SG Wattenscheid 09	14
5	(Senegal) Blaise Mamoum	Werder Bremen (A)	14
5	(Germany) Jens Scharping	VfB Lübeck	14
5	(Czech Republic) Pavel Dobrý	1. FC Magdeburg	14
9	(Germany) Hendryk Lau	Dresdner SC	12
10	(Lithuania) Dmitrijus Guscinas	Holstein Kiel	11
10	(Germany) Markus Daun	Bayer Leverkusen (A)	11
10	(Germany) Dirk de Wit	Eintracht Braunschweig	11
10	(Germany) Sven Lintjens	SG Wattenscheid 09	11

== Regionalliga Süd ==
Wacker Burghausen won the Regionalliga Süd and was promoted to 2. Bundesliga along with runners-up Eintracht Trier.
VfB Stuttgart Amateure, SpVgg Ansbach, Borussia Fulda and VfR Mannheim were relegated to the Oberliga.

=== Standings ===
Pos	Team	Pld	W	D	L	GF	GA	GD	Pts	Promotion or relegation
1	Wacker Burghausen (C, P)	34	19	10	5	49	22	+27	67	Promotion to 2. Bundesliga
2	Eintracht Trier (P)	34	16	11	7	51	34	+17	59	Promotion to 2. Bundesliga
3	Jahn Regensburg	34	17	7	10	57	40	+17	58	
4	VfR Aalen	34	17	5	12	67	60	+7	56	
5	Rot-Weiß Erfurt	34	15	9	10	47	31	+16	54	
6	Wehen Wiesbaden	34	14	12	8	50	45	+5	54	
7	Sportfreunde Siegen	34	14	10	10	49	37	+12	52	
8	Kickers Offenbach	34	12	13	9	42	37	+5	49	
9	VfR Mannheim (Note: VfR Mannheim did not apply for a license for the next season.) (R)	34	12	13	9	47	42	+5	49	Relegation to Oberliga
10	Bayern Munich II	34	13	9	12	58	51	+7	48	
11	SV Elversberg	34	14	6	14	41	41	0	48	
12	Stuttgarter Kickers	34	10	14	10	42	45	−3	44	
13	1899 Hoffenheim	34	11	9	14	53	49	+4	42	
14	Darmstadt 98	34	10	12	12	43	45	−2	42	
15	1. FC Kaiserslautern II	34	9	7	18	41	60	−19	34	
16	VfB Stuttgart II (R)	34	8	7	19	43	58	−15	31	Relegation to Oberliga
17	SpVgg Ansbach (R)	34	7	7	20	27	66	−39	28	Relegation to Oberliga
18	Borussia Fulda (R)	34	2	12	20	23	67	−44	18	Relegation to Oberliga

Source: fussballdaten.de
Rules for classification: 1) points; 2) goal difference; 3) number of goals scored.
(C) Champions; (P) Promoted; (R) Relegated

=== Results ===
Home \ Away	BUR	TRI	REG	AAL	ERF	WEH	SIE	OFF	MAN	MÜN	ELV	STU	HOF	DAR	KAI	VFB	ANS	FUL
SV Wacker Burghausen		2–2	1–1	2–1	1–0	2–0	0–2	3–0	1–1	1–2	1–1	2–0	0–0	4–1	0–0	1–0	5–0	2–0
Eintracht Trier	1–0		3–0	1–2	2–3	3–0	2–0	1–0	2–3	3–0	2–1	2–2	2–0	2–2	3–2	1–0	2–3	0–0
SSV Jahn Regensburg	0–1	5–0		2–3	1–0	2–1	2–0	2–0	1–1	0–3	3–1	4–1	0–0	2–0	3–2	3–2	2–1	6–0
VfR Aalen	0–3	1–1	1–3		2–2	0–1	2–1	2–3	3–0	2–1	2–0	1–1	3–3	3–2	2–4	1–0	7–0	2–0
Rot-Weiß Erfurt	2–2	0–0	2–1	2–3		1–2	1–1	0–0	2–0	3–1	2–1	2–0	2–0	0–0	1–0	2–0	0–1	2–1
SV Wehen	0–1	1–1	0–1	4–3	1–0		1–0	2–2	2–0	2–2	2–0	3–3	3–1	3–1	2–0	4–2	1–1	0–0
Sportfreunde Siegen	0–0	0–0	4–1	1–0	1–1	4–1		2–0	0–2	3–1	1–0	1–2	3–2	0–2	3–0	2–2	4–1	0–0
Kickers Offenbach	0–1	0–0	2–0	5–2	0–1	1–1	2–0		2–2	0–0	0–0	2–1	2–0	1–0	1–2	3–0	4–1	2–0
VfR Mannheim	1–0	0–0	5–3	2–0	1–3	0–0	1–3	0–0		2–0	2–0	2–0	1–1	2–0	3–0	3–2	4–3	1–1
FC Bayern Munich Amateure	1–1	0–2	1–0	4–3	0–3	0–1	3–1	4–1	0–0		2–1	0–0	2–2	2–4	3–1	2–4	0–0	9–0
SV Elversberg	1–1	2–1	1–1	1–2	3–2	4–1	1–0	2–0	2–0	2–1		1–1	1–3	2–1	0–0	0–2	3–0	2–0
Stuttgarter Kickers	0–1	1–0	2–1	1–2	2–1	1–2	2–2	1–0	1–1	4–2	2–0		1–0	0–0	2–2	0–0	1–1	1–2
TSG Hoffenheim	1–2	1–2	1–1	6–0	1–1	1–1	1–2	3–0	2–1	1–2	3–1	4–2		0–1	2–3	1–2	2–0	3–2
SV Darmstadt 98	3–1	0–0	0–2	1–1	0–0	2–1	2–2	0–2	2–2	2–3	2–0	0–2	1–1		1–0	3–0	0–0	2–2
1. FC Kaiserslautern Amateure	0–1	1–3	1–1	1–2	1–0	0–0	0–3	1–3	2–2	1–2	0–2	2–2	2–4	1–3		1–3	3–0	3–2
VfB Stuttgart Amateure	1–2	1–3	0–1	2–3	0–2	3–3	0–1	0–2	2–1	2–2	1–2	1–1	2–0	2–1	1–2		0–1	1–1
SpVgg Ansbach	0–3	0–1	0–2	0–4	1–0	1–2	1–1	3–1	2–1	0–0	0–2	0–1	1–2	1–1	0–1	1–3		1–0
Borussia Fulda	0–1	1–3	0–0	0–3	1–4	2–2	1–1	0–1	0–0	0–3	0–1	1–1	0–1	1–3	0–2	2–2	3–2	

Legend: Blue = home team win; Yellow = draw; Red = away team win.

=== Top scorers ===
Rank	Player	Club	Goals
1	(Tunisia) Saber Ben Neticha	SV Wehen	18
2	(Germany) Patrick Würll	Kickers Offenbach	16
2	(Germany) Ronny Hebestreit	Rot-Weiß Erfurt	16
4	(Germany) Danny Winkler	Eintracht Trier	15
4	(Hungary) András Tölcséres	SSV Jahn Regensburg	15
6	(Senegal) Miguel Coulibaly	VfR Aalen	14
6	(Nigeria) Festus Agu	VfR Aalen	14
6	(Brazil) Elton da Costa	SV Darmstadt 98	14
6	(Germany) Steffen Hofmann	Bayern Munich (A)	14
6	(Bosnia and Herzegovina) Zvjezdan Misimović	Bayern Munich (A)	14
