= 2003–04 Regionalliga =

10th season of the Regionalliga as a third-level league

Regionalliga
- Season: 2003–04
- Promoted: Rot-Weiss Essen; Dynamo Dresden; FC Rot-Weiß Erfurt; 1. FC Saarbrücken
- Relegated: SG Wattenscheid 09; FC Schalke 04 II; FC Sachsen Leipzig; VfR Neumünster; 1. FC Schweinfurt 05; 1. FC Eschborn; 1. FC Kaiserslautern II

The 2003–04 Regionalliga season was the tenth season of the Regionalliga tier three of the German football league system. It was contested in two geographical divisions with eighteen teams each. The competition began on 1 August 2003 with the first matches of each division and ended on the 5 June 2004.

== Team movements ==
=== Teams Promoted to 2. Bundesliga ===
==== From Nord ====
- Erzgebirge Aue
- VfL Osnabrück

==== From Süd ====
- SpVgg Unterhaching
- Jahn Regensburg

=== Teams Relegated from 2. Bundesliga ===
==== To Nord ====
- Eintracht Braunschweig
- FC St. Pauli

==== To Süd ====
- SSV Reutlingen
- SV Waldhof Mannheim

=== Teams Relegated to Oberliga ===
==== From Nord ====
- SC Verl
- SV Babelsberg 03
- Bayer Leverkusen II
- Dresdner SC

==== From Süd ====
- Stuttgarter Kickers
- Sportfreunde Siegen
- SV Darmstadt 98
- Eintracht Frankfurt II
- Borussia Neunkirchen

=== Teams promoted from Oberliga ===
==== To Nord ====
- FC Schalke 04 II(Oberliga Westfalen Champions)
- Sachsen Leipzig(NOFV-Oberliga Nord Champions)

==== To Süd ====
- VfB Stuttgart II(Oberliga Baden-Württemberg Champions)
- 1. SC Feucht(Bayernliga Champions)
- 1. FSV Mainz 05(Oberliga Südwest Champions)

== Regionalligas ==
=== Regionalliga Nord ===
==== Table ====
Pos	Team	Pld	W	D	L	GF	GA	GD	Pts	Promotion or relegation
1	Rot-Weiss Essen (C, P)	34	23	5	6	59	34	+25	74	Promotion to 2. Bundesliga
2	1. FC Dynamo Dresden (P)	34	18	11	5	51	26	+25	65	Promotion to 2. Bundesliga
3	SC Paderborn 07	34	17	11	6	56	40	+16	62	
4	Wuppertaler SV	34	18	8	8	49	37	+12	62	
5	Werder Bremen II	34	16	7	11	55	44	+11	55	
6	Eintracht Braunschweig	34	15	7	12	49	42	+7	52	
7	KFC Uerdingen 05	34	13	7	14	46	48	−2	46	
8	FC St. Pauli	34	12	8	14	44	40	+4	44	
9	Hamburger SV II	34	11	11	12	33	46	−13	44	
10	Borussia Dortmund II	34	12	7	15	43	47	−4	43	
11	Chemnitzer FC	34	13	4	17	31	49	−18	43	
12	Holstein Kiel	34	11	9	14	52	46	+6	42	
13	Preußen Münster	34	10	12	12	40	45	−5	42	
14	1. FC Köln II	34	10	11	13	53	53	0	41	
15	SG Wattenscheid 09 (R)	34	11	7	16	51	60	−9	40	Relegation to Oberliga
16	FC Schalke 04 II (R)	34	10	8	16	54	70	−16	38	Relegation to Oberliga
17	Sachsen Leipzig (R)	34	4	12	18	34	56	−22	24	Relegation to Oberliga
18	VfR Neumünster (R)	34	4	11	19	32	65	−33	23	Relegation to Oberliga

Source: Weltfussball.de
Rules for classification: 1) points; 2) goal difference; 3) number of goals scored.
(C) Champions; (P) Promoted; (R) Relegated

==== Top scorers ====
Pos	Player	Team	Goals
1	(Germany) Markus Feldhoff	KFC Uerdingen 05	22
2	(Bulgaria) Veselin Gerov	SC Paderborn 07	19
2	(Germany) Alexander Löbe	SG Wattenscheid 09	19
3	(Netherlands) Erwin Koen	Rot-Weiss Essen	18
4	(Brazil) Daniel Teixeira	Holstein Kiel	17
5	(Germany) Markus Katriniok	SG Wattenscheid 09	13
5	(Germany) Benjamin Köhler	Rot-Weiss Essen	13
5	(Nigeria) Abdul Iyodo	FC Schalke 04	13
5	(Russia) Denis Koslov	Sachsen Leipzig	13
5	(Turkey) Ahmet Kuru	Werder Bremen Amateure	13

Source: Weltfussball.de

=== Regionalliga Süd ===
==== Table ====
Pos	Team	Pld	W	D	L	GF	GA	GD	Pts	Promotion or relegation
1	Bayern Munich II (Note: Despite being champions, Bayern Munich II, since being a reserve side, were barred from promotion allowing 1. FC Saarbrücken to be promoted to the 2004–05 2. Bundesliga) (C)	34	17	13	4	71	33	+38	64	
2	Rot-Weiß Erfurt (P)	34	15	10	9	52	39	+13	55	Promotion to 2. Bundesliga
3	1. FC Saarbrücken (P)	34	13	14	7	53	44	+9	53	Promotion to 2. Bundesliga
4	FC Augsburg	34	15	7	12	57	41	+16	52	
5	TSG Hoffenheim	34	15	7	12	54	58	−4	52	
6	VfR Aalen	34	14	9	11	61	63	−2	51	
7	SV Wehen	34	12	13	9	47	47	0	49	
8	1. SC Feucht	34	12	12	10	62	51	+11	48	
9	Stuttgarter Kickers	34	13	8	13	47	43	+4	47	
10	SC Pfullendorf	34	13	7	14	45	48	−3	46	
11	VfB Stuttgart II	34	13	5	16	44	40	+4	44	
12	SV 07 Elversberg	34	11	11	12	41	47	−6	44	
13	Kickers Offenbach	34	11	10	13	47	53	−6	43	
14	1. FSV Mainz 05 II	34	11	9	14	40	48	−8	42	
15	1. FC Schweinfurt 05 (Note: Schweinfurt were bankrupt after the season and didn't not apply for another licence sparing Siegen from relegation) (R)	34	11	7	16	53	58	−5	40	Relegation to Oberliga
16	Sportfreunde Siegen	34	10	7	17	53	63	−10	37	
17	1. FC Eschborn (R)	34	8	9	17	47	74	−27	33	Relegation to Oberliga
18	1. FC Kaiserslautern II (R)	34	8	8	18	43	67	−24	32	Relegation to Oberliga

Source: Weltfussball.de
Rules for classification: 1) points; 2) goal difference; 3) number of goals scored.
(C) Champions; (P) Promoted; (R) Relegated

==== Top scorers ====
Pos	Player	Team	Goals
1	(Peru) Paolo Guerrero	Bayern Munich II	21
1	(Bosnia and Herzegovina) Zvjezdan Misimović	Bayern Munich II	21
2	(Germany) René Müller	Rot-Weiß Erfurt	19
3	(Germany) Alexander Blessin	SC Pfullendorf	16
3	(Croatia) Neno Rogošić	VfR Aalen	16
4	(Turkey) Ünal Demirkiran	VfR Aalen	15
4	(Belgium) Gunter Thiebaut	1. FC Saarbrücken	15
5	(United States) John van Buskirk	Sportfreunde Siegen	14
6	(Serbia and Montenegro) Veselin Popovic	1. FC Schweinfurt 05	13
6	(Germany) Mirnes Mesic	Stuttgarter Kickers	13
6	(Germany) Christian Seeber	VfR Aalen	13

Source: Weltfussball.de
