= Regionalliga Süd (1994–2012) =

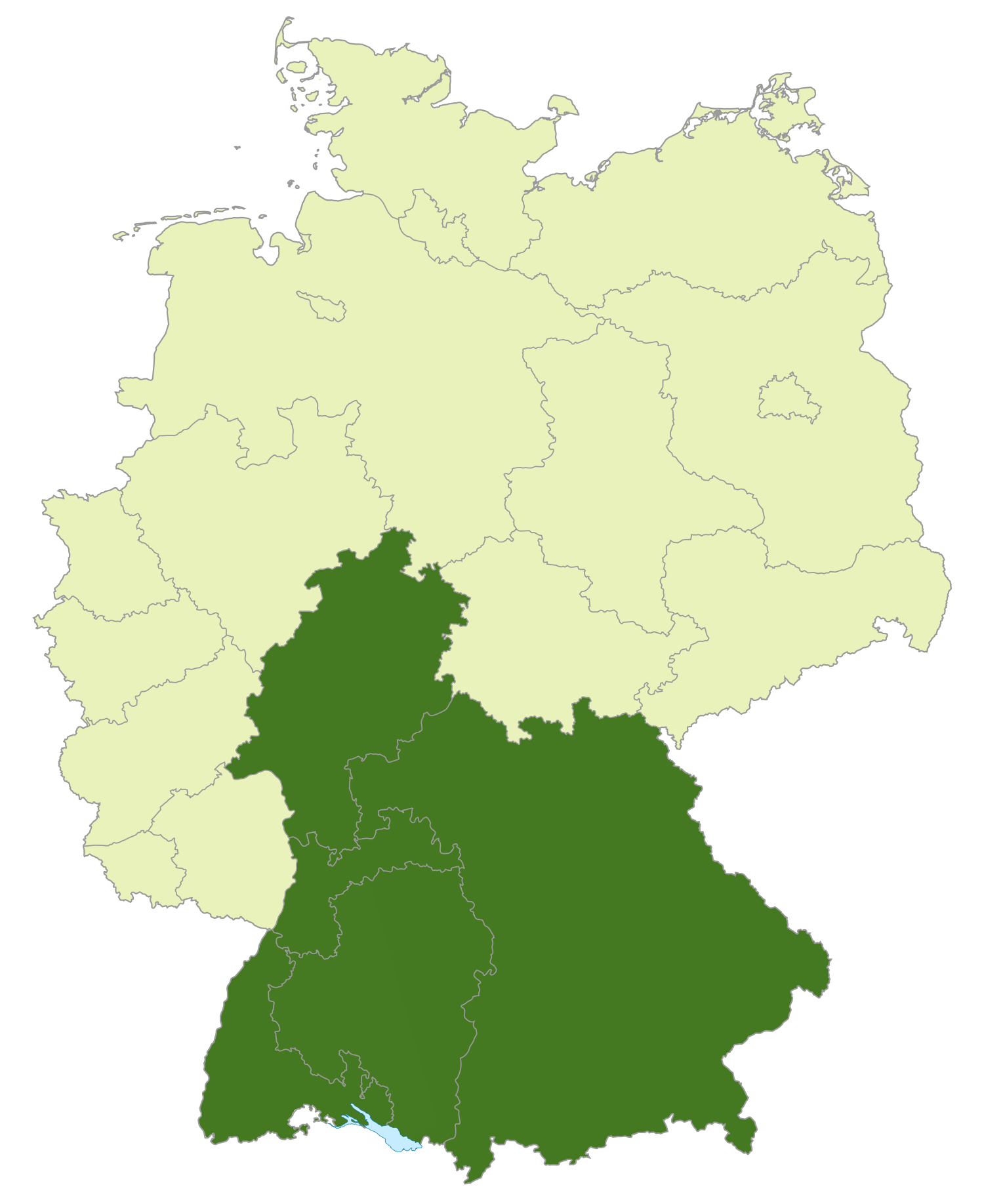
- Founded: 1994
- Folded: 2012
- Country: Germany
- State: Bavaria; Baden-Württemberg; Hesse; Rhineland-Palatinate (2000–2008); Saarland (2000–2008); Thuringia (2000–2004)
- Number of clubs: 18
- Level on pyramid: Level 4
- Promotion to: 3. Liga
- Relegation to: Bayernliga; Hessenliga; Oberliga Baden-Württemberg; Oberliga Südwest
- Last champions: Stuttgarter Kickers (2011–12)

The Regionalliga Süd (English: Regional League South) was the fourth tier of the German football league system from 2008 to 2012. Until the introduction of the 3. Liga in 2008, it was the third tier. It was the highest regional league for the southern part of Germany. It covered the states of Bavaria, Hesse and Baden-Württemberg and was one of three leagues at this level, together with the Regionalliga Nord and the Regionalliga West.

The league was disbanded at the end of the 2011–12 season, with the Bavarian clubs joining the new Regionalliga Bayern while the others joined the clubs from the southwest of Germany to form the new Regionalliga Südwest.

From 1963 to 1974, a Regionalliga Süd existed as the second tier of the German football league system, but this league is not directly related to the current one.

== Overview ==
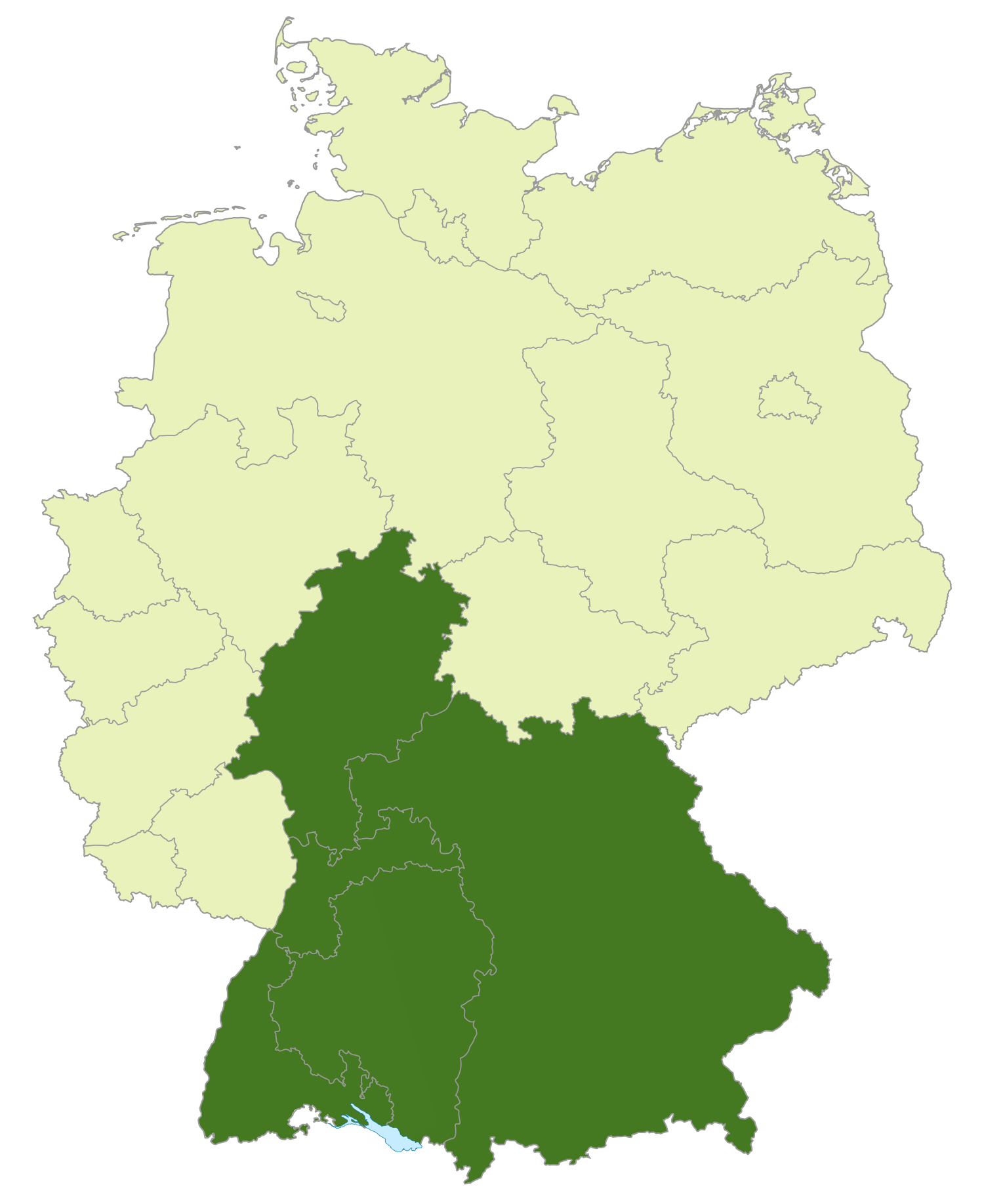
Map of Germany:Position of the Regionalliga Süd (1994–2000) highlighted

The Regionalliga Süd was introduced in 1994 along with three other Regionalligas, those being:

- Regionalliga Nord
- Regionalliga Nordost
- Regionalliga West/Südwest

The reason for its introduction was to create a highest regional league for the south of Germany and to allow its champions, and some years the runners-up too, to be directly promoted to the 2. Bundesliga. Previous to the introduction of the four Regionalligas, below the second division were ten Oberligas. Those ten Oberliga champions had to go through a promotion play-off rather than being directly promoted.

The Regionalliga Süd originally was made up from clubs from the three southern states of Bavaria, Hesse and Baden-Württemberg. In 2000, with the reduction of the number of Regionalligas to two, the league also covered the states of Rhineland-Palatinate, Saarland and Thuringia. It also incorporated one club from Northrhine-Westphalia, the Sportfreunde Siegen.

From 2008, with re-expansion to three Regionalligas, the league again only contained clubs from the three original states. However, in 2010–11, the Wormatia Worms, a club from Rhineland-Palatinate, competed in the league.

== League history ==
=== Foundation of the Regionalliga Süd ===
The Regionalliga Süd was formed in 1994 with 18 clubs, originally with six from each of the three Oberligas. However, Baden-Württemberg lost one spot due to the Stuttgarter Kickers being relegated from the 2. Bundesliga.

The founding members were:

From 2. Bundesliga:

- Stuttgarter Kickers (Baden-Württemberg)

From the Oberliga Bayern:

- FC Augsburg
- SpVgg Unterhaching
- SpVgg Fürth
- TSV Vestenbergsgreuth
- FC Bayern Munich II
- SV Lohhof

From the Oberliga Baden-Württemberg:

- SSV Ulm 1846
- SpVgg Ludwigsburg
- TSF Ditzingen
- SSV Reutlingen
- VfR Mannheim

From the Oberliga Hessen:

- Hessen Kassel
- Kickers Offenbach
- Rot-Weiß Frankfurt
- SG Egelsbach
- SV Wehen
- SV Darmstadt 98

The "new" Regionalliga Süd was actually a reformation of the "old" Regionalliga Süd which operated from 1963 to 1974 in the same region but then as the second tier of German football. Unlike the "old" Regionalliga, the new one allowed reserve teams to compete in it.

Its first season saw the SpVgg Unterhaching winning the league and being promoted to the 2. Bundesliga while three out of the four teams relegated came from Hessen.

=== Expansion of the league in 2000 ===
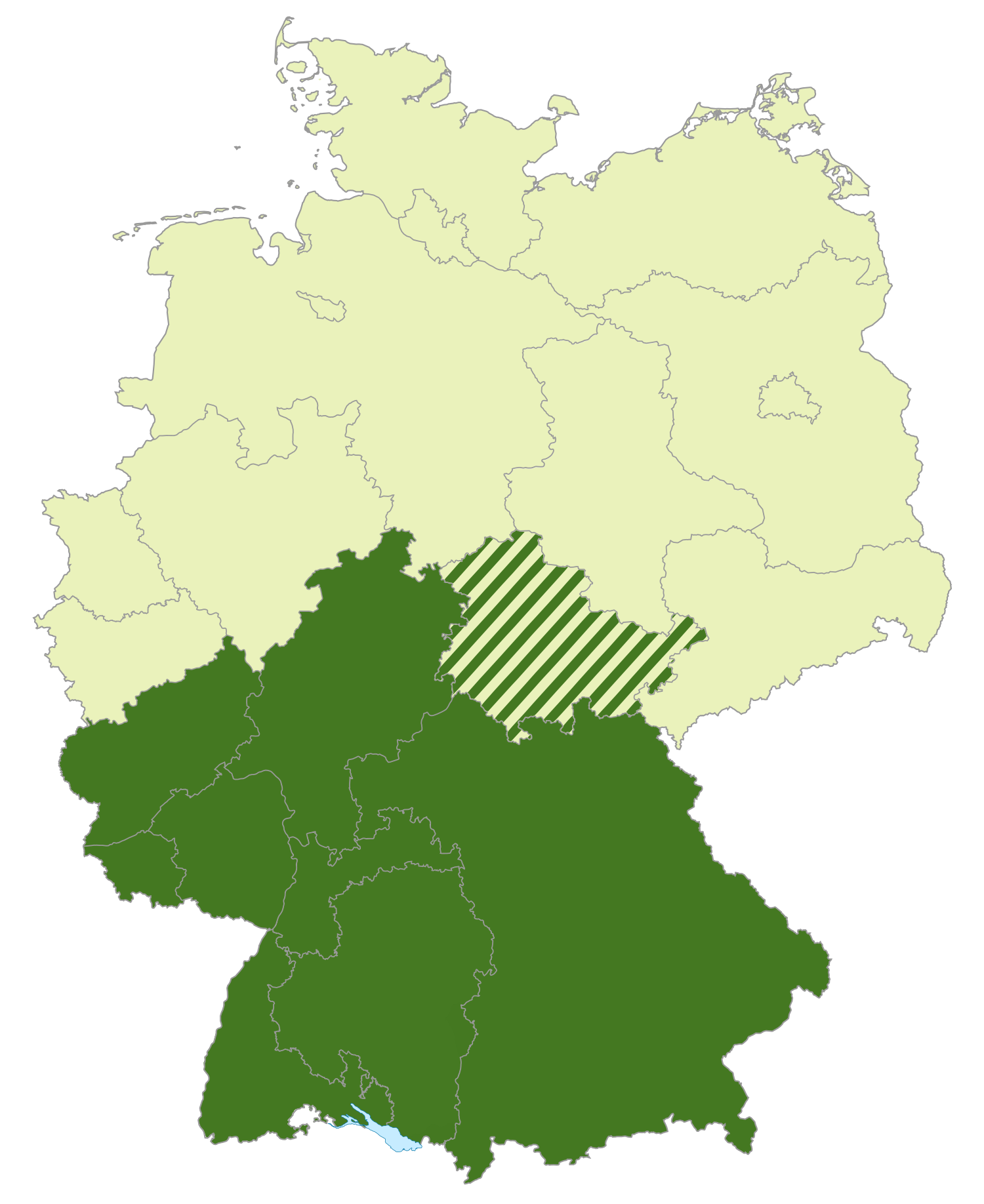
Map of Germany:Position of the Regionalliga Süd (2000–2008) highlighted

After six seasons, in 2000, the number of Regionalligas was reduced from four to two. Only the Regionalligas Süd and Nord survived. The clubs of the other two were spread according to their geographical location.

To make room for these extra clubs without expanding past the 18 team number, the seven bottom placed teams were supposed to be relegated. However, FC Augsburg (8th) did not receive a license for the next season and Karlsruher SC II (12th) had to drop down because the first team was relegated to the Regionalliga and regulations forbid two teams from the same club to compete in the same league at this level.

The relegated clubs were:

- FC Augsburg
- Karlsruher SC II
- FSV Frankfurt
- TSF Ditzingen
- SG Quelle Fürth
- Borussia Fulda
- SV Lohhof

In their stead, the following seven teams were admitted:

From the 2. Bundesliga:

- Karlsruher SC
- Kickers Offenbach

From the Regionalliga West/Südwest:

- Eintracht Trier
- SV Elversberg
- Sportfreunde Siegen

From the Regionalliga Nordost:

- FC Carl Zeiss Jena
- Rot-Weiß Erfurt

=== The league reform in 2008 ===
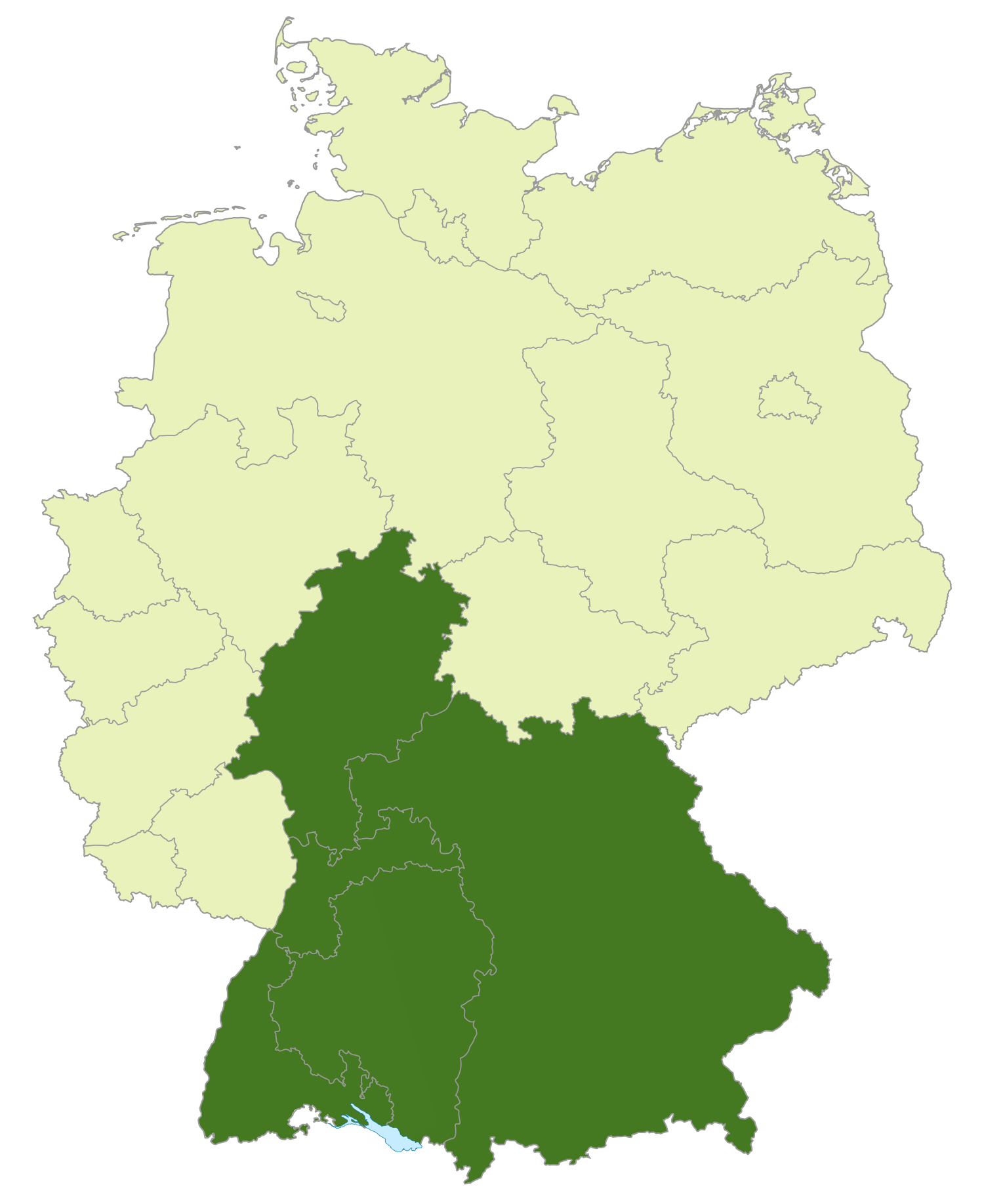
Map of Germany:Position of the Regionalliga Süd (from the 2008–09 season) highlighted

With the introduction of the 3. Liga in 2008 and of a third Regionalliga, the Regionalliga West, the league became the fourth tier of German football. The clubs from the regions which joined in 2000 left again and the Regionalliga Süd was once more only made up from clubs from Bavaria, Hesse and Baden-Württemberg.

The make up of the leagues was:

- Winner and runners-up of the Regionalliga Süd will qualified for the 2. Bundesliga (unless they are reserve teams)
- Clubs placed third to tenth went to the new 3. Liga (only the two best placed reserve teams were to be admitted)
- Clubs placed eleventh to eighteens remained in the Regionalligas (only clubs from the three southern states went to the southern group)
- The four best teams out of the Oberligas Baden-Württemberg, Hessen and Bayern were promoted to the Regionalliga Süd

When the 2007–08 season finished on 31 May 2008, the following teams had fulfilled the on-the-field qualification for the Regionalliga. However, financial qualification was also necessary.

Remaining in the Regionalliga Süd:

- SSV Reutlingen
- TSV 1860 Munich II
- Hessen Kassel
- Karlsruher SC II
- SC Pfullendorf

From the Oberliga Bayern:

- SpVgg Greuther Fürth II
- 1. FC Nürnberg II
- TSV Grossbardorf
- 1. FC Eintracht Bamberg
- SpVgg Unterhaching II

From the Oberliga Hessen:

- SV Darmstadt 98
- SV Wehen Wiesbaden II
- Viktoria Aschaffenburg
- Eintracht Frankfurt II

From the Oberliga Baden-Württemberg:

- SSV Ulm 1846
- SV Waldhof Mannheim
- SC Freiburg II
- 1. FC Heidenheim

Sportfreunde Siegen were intended to be the 18th club in the Regionalliga Süd, but due to its insolvency, the club was demoted to the Oberliga Nordrhein-Westfalen or below for the 2008–09 season. 1. FC Eintracht Bamberg was admitted to the Regionalliga in their stead, as the fifth-placed team in the largest of the southern football associations. Due to the refusal of a licence to Bayernliga champion SpVgg Bayreuth, Bamberg was awarded a place in the Regionalliga. The available last place then went to the SpVgg Unterhaching II.

=== 2008–2012 ===
After a 2008–09 season with a large number of new clubs, the league returned to a normal promotion/relegation system, with the winner moving up to the 3. Liga and the three last-placed teams being relegated to the Oberliga, while the three southern Oberliga champions were promoted in turn. In 2008–09, two clubs from the 3. Liga were relegated to the league. This would have increased the number of teams to 19. However, Waldhof Mannheim was transferred to the Regionalliga West for the next season. Hessen Kassel, who had hoped to join the Regionalliga Nord for 2009–10 had to remain in the south. Viktoria Aschaffenburg, which finished on a non-relegation rank, withdrew from the league, allowing Karlsruher SC II to remain in it.

In the 2009–10 season, 1. FC Eintracht Bamberg and SSV Reutlingen both declared insolvency, forcing them to be automatically relegated.

In October 2010, another reform of the Regionalligas was decided upon. The number of leagues were now to be expanded to five, with the Bavarian clubs to leave the Regionalliga Süd and form their own Regionalliga Bayern. In their stead, the south western clubs from Rhineland-Palatinate and Saarland would re-join the league. The new system is due to come into operation in the 2012–13 season. It was also decided to limit the number of reserve teams per Regionalliga to seven.

In the 2010–11 season, SpVgg Weiden declared insolvency due to more than Euro 1 million in debts. Unable to raise enough funds to continue competing in the league, Weiden declared on 30 November 2010 that it would withdraw its Regionalliga team and thereby automatically be relegated. All games for the club in the 2010–11 season were declared void. The SSV Ulm 1846 suffered a similar fate, but was able to complete its fixtures as friendlies. Nevertheless, the club was relegated and its record expunged.

At the end of the season, the league became defunct with the Bavarian clubs joining the new Regionalliga Bayern while the remainder of the league members joined the new Regionalliga Südwest. The exceptions were the Stuttgarter Kickers, which were promoted to the 3. Liga, the FC Bayern Alzenau which, despite being from Bavaria, opted to play in the Regionalliga Süd/Südwest and Karlsruher SC II which was ineligible for the Regionalliga after the first team of the club was relegated to the 3. Liga. No other team was relegated.

== Winners and runners-up of the Regionalliga Süd ==
The winners and runners-up of the league are:

Season	Winner	Runner-up
1994–95	SpVgg Unterhaching	Stuttgarter Kickers
1995–96	Stuttgarter Kickers	VfR Mannheim
1996–97	1. FC Nürnberg	SpVgg Greuther Fürth
1997–98	SSV Ulm 1846	Kickers Offenbach
1998–99	SV Waldhof Mannheim	Kickers Offenbach
1999–2000	SSV Reutlingen	SC Pfullendorf
2000–01	Karlsruher SC	VfB Stuttgart II
2001–02	Wacker Burghausen	Eintracht Trier
2002–03	SpVgg Unterhaching	SSV Jahn Regensburg
2003–04	FC Bayern Munich II	Rot-Weiß Erfurt
2004–05	Kickers Offenbach	Sportfreunde Siegen
2005–06	FC Augsburg	TuS Koblenz
2006–07	SV Wehen	TSG 1899 Hoffenheim
2007–08	FSV Frankfurt	FC Ingolstadt 04
2008–09	1. FC Heidenheim	KSV Hessen Kassel
2009–10	VfR Aalen	1. FC Nürnberg II
2010–11	SV Darmstadt 98	Stuttgarter Kickers
2011–12	Stuttgarter Kickers	SG Sonnenhof Großaspach

Source:"Regionalliga Süd". Das deutsche Fussball-Archiv.

- In 1997, the runners-up SpVgg Greuther Fürth was also promoted.
- In 1999, the runners-up Kickers Offenbach was also promoted.
- From 2001 to 2008, the runners-up was always promoted. In 2001 however, FC Schweinfurt 05 (3rd) won promotion as VfB Stuttgart II was ineligible.
- In 2004, 1. FC Saarbrücken (3rd) won promotion as FC Bayern Munich II was ineligible.

== League statistics ==
The top goal scorers and spectator statistics for the league are:

Season	Overall Spectators	Per game	Best supported Club	Spectators /game	Top goal scorer	Goals
1994–95	427,576	1,397	Stuttgarter Kickers	2,759	Jonathan Akpoborie (SK)	37
1995–96	353,617	1,156	Stuttgarter Kickers	3,181	Dragan Trkulja (Ulm)	25
1996–97	779,612	2,548	1. FC Nürnberg	15,328	Frank Türr (GF)	25
1997–98	693,500	2,375	Kickers Offenbach	12,906	Dieter Eckstein (FCA)	21
1998–99	568,494	1,858	Kickers Offenbach	11,500	Marijo Maric (SSV)	23
1999–2000	365,281	1,194	SV Darmstadt 98	3,667	Oliver Djappa (SSV)	36
2000–01	932,249	3,047	Karlsruher SC	10,050	Marko Barlecaj (SCP)	18
2001–02	717,193	2,344	Kickers Offenbach	6,911	Saber Ben Neticha (SVW)	18
2002–03	803,856	2,350	Jahn Regensburg	5,105	Francisco Copado (SpVggU)	24
2003–04	670,371	2,191	1. FC Saarbrücken	6,141	Zvjezdan Misimovic (FCB); José Guerrero (FCB)	21
2004–05	711,904	2,326	Kickers Offenbach	6,669	Patrick Helmes (SFS)	21
2005–06	561,058	1,834	TuS Koblenz	4,657	Maximilian Nicu (SVW); Christian Okpala (FCA)	16
2006–07	685,182	2,239	Hessen Kassel	4,383	Mirnes Mesic (TSG); Jonathan Jäger (1. FCS)	17
2007–08	775,651	2,535	Sportfreunde Siegen	6,095	Thorsten Bauer (KSV)	20
2008–09	424,619	1,388	Hessen Kassel	4,282	Thorsten Bauer (KSV)	32
2009–10	367,834	1,202	VfR Aalen	3,258	Mijo Tunjic (SK); Abedin Krasniqi (SG)	19
2010–11	304,647	1,269	Hessen Kassel	5,520	Kai Herdling (TSG)	19
2011–12	308,062	1,007	Stuttgarter Kickers	3,561	Karl Lappe (FCI II)	18

League record

== Placings in the Regionalliga Süd ==
The following clubs have played in the league and achieved the following final positions:

Club	95	96	97	98	99	00	01	02	03	04	05	06	07	08	09	10	11	12
TSG 1899 Hoffenheim								13	5	5	7	4	2	2B	B	B	B	B
1. FC Nürnberg	2B	2B	1	2B	B	2B	2B	B	B	2B	B	B	B	B	2B	B	B	B
FC Augsburg ^{1}	9	11	11	10	14	8			3	4	4	1	2B	2B	2B	2B	2B	B
SpVgg Greuther Fürth ^{5}	3	8	2	2B	2B	2B	2B	2B	2B	2B	2B	2B	2B	2B	2B	2B	2B	2B
Karlsruher SC	B	B	B	B	2B	2B	1	2B	2B	2B	2B	2B	2B	B	B	2B	2B	2B
FSV Frankfurt	2B	18			15	14								1	2B	2B	2B	2B
FC Ingolstadt 04													5	2	2B	3L	2B	2B
SV Wehen	17			13	6	13	11	6	7	7	3	3	1	2B	2B	2B	3L	3L
Kickers Offenbach	15			2	2	2B	10	8	8	13	1	2B	2B	2B	3L	3L	3L	3L
FC Carl Zeiss Jena *	RL	2B	2B	2B	RL	RL	18					RL	2B	2B	3L	3L	3L	3L
SpVgg Unterhaching	1	2B	2B	2B	2B	B	B	2B	1	2B	2B	2B	2B	6	3L	3L	3L	3L
Wacker Burghausen		9	5	5	7	4	13	1	2B	2B	2B	2B	2B	7	3L	3L	3L	3L
Rot-Weiß Erfurt *	RL	RL	RL	RL	RL	RL	15	5	9	2	2B	2B	RL	RL	3L	3L	3L	3L
VfB Stuttgart II					4	6	2	16		11	13	7	3	3	3L	3L	3L	3L
SV Sandhausen		16												5	3L	3L	3L	3L
SSV Jahn Regensburg							12	3	2	2B	8	17		9	3L	3L	3L	3L
1. FC Heidenheim															1	3L	3L	3L
VfR Aalen						10	7	4	10	6	12	6	6	4	3L	1	3L	3L
1. FC Saarbrücken *	2B	RL	RL	RL	RL	RL	2B	2B	6	3	2B	2B	15			RL	3L	3L
SV Darmstadt 98	11	15	13	16		9	5	14	17		5	5	16		15	15	1	3L
TuS Koblenz *											11	2	2B	2B	2B	2B	3L	RL
Eintracht Trier *	RL	RL	RL	RL	RL	RL	4	2	2B	2B	2B	16			RL	RL	RL	RL
SV Elversberg *			RL		RL	RL	14	11	14	12	10	9	9	15	RL	RL	RL	RL
1. FC Kaiserslautern II *		RL		RL	RL	RL		15	13	18		13	18		RL	RL	RL	RL
FSV Mainz II *										14	17				RL	RL	RL	RL
Stuttgarter Kickers	2	1	2B	2B	2B	2B	2B	12	15	9	9	8	4	10	3L	9	2	1
SG Sonnenhof Großaspach																12	14	2
Eintracht Frankfurt II		17							18						3	8	6	3
Wormatia Worms *															RL	RL	12	4
Karlsruher SC II ^{2}			14	8	11	12						11	14	16	16	5	10	5
SpVgg Greuther Fürth II															11	11	4	6
TSG 1899 Hoffenheim II																	5	7
SC Freiburg II															14	3	7	8
FC Ingolstadt 04 II																		9
1. FC Nürnberg II															5	2	11	10
KSV Hessen Kassel	13	10	12	18									10	14	2	4	3	11
SV Waldhof Mannheim	2B	2B	2B	7	1	2B	2B	2B	2B						4	RL		12
TSV 1860 Munich II				9	9	7	16				15	15	13	13	6	7	8	13
FC Bayern Munich II	7	13	8	6	8	5	9	10	4	1	6	12	8	8	3L	3L	3L	14
FC Memmingen																	13	15
SC Pfullendorf					16	2	17		11	10	16	14	7	17	8	13	9	16
FSV Frankfurt II																	15	17
FC Bayern Alzenau																18		18
SV Wehen Wiesbaden II															9	16	16	
SSV Ulm 1846	4	3	6	1	2B	B	2B								7	6	17	
SpVgg Weiden																10	18	
SSV Reutlingen ^{7}	14	4	3	4	3	1	2B	2B	2B				11	12	12	14		
1. FC Eintracht Bamberg															10	17		
Viktoria Aschaffenburg ^{6}															13			
TSV Großbardorf															17			
SpVgg Unterhaching II															18			
FSV Oggersheim *														18	RL			
Sportfreunde Siegen *				RL	RL	RL	6	7	16	16	2	2B	12	11				
FK Pirmasens *						RL							17					
SpVgg Bayreuth ^{3}												10						
1. FC Eschborn										17		18						
1. SC Feucht										8	14							
FC Nöttingen											18							
FC Schweinfurt 05					5	11	3	2B	12	15								
Borussia Neunkirchen *	RL	RL							19									
VfR Mannheim ^{4}	8	2	7	14	10	3	8	9										
SpVgg Ansbach								17										
Borussia Fulda			4	3	13	17		18										
TSF Ditzingen	6	5	15	12	12	15												
SG Quelle Fürth			17			16												
SV Lohhof	16					18												
SC Weismain			10	11	17													
SC Neukirchen		12	9	15	18													
VfL Kirchheim/Teck				17														
SpVgg Ludwigsburg	10	7	16															
SG Egelsbach	12	14	18															
TSV Vestenbergsgreuth ^{5}	5	6																
Rot-Weiß Frankfurt	18																	

Source:"Regionalliga Süd". Das deutsche Fussball-Archiv.

=== Key ===
Symbol	Key
B	Bundesliga
2B	2. Bundesliga
3L	3. Liga
1	League champions
Place	League
Blank	Played at a league level below this league
RL	Played in one of the other Regionalligas

=== Notes ===
- Clubs from outside the three southern states of Bavaria, Hesse and Baden-Württemberg are marked with an *.
- ^{1} FC Augsburg was refused a license in 2000 and relegated to the Oberliga
- ^{2} Karlsruher SC II was relegated to the Oberliga in 2000 since the club's first team was relegated to the Regionalliga.
- ^{3} SpVgg Bayreuth was refused a licence in 2006 and relegated to the Oberliga.
- ^{4} VfR Mannheim withdrew from the league in 2002.
- ^{5} TSV Vestenbergsgreuth merged with SpVgg Fürth in 1996 to form SpVgg Greuther Fürth.
- ^{6} Viktoria Aschaffenburg withdrew from the league in 2009.
- ^{7} SSV Reutlingen declared insolvency in 2010 and was relegated.
