= Okić =

Okić may refer to:

- Okić Castle, a castle in Zagreb County, Croatia
- Okić (village), a village in Karlovac County, Croatia
- Okić (surname)
