= Okić (surname) =

Okić (sometimes spelled Okič or Okiç) is a surname. Notable people with the surname include:

- Branko Okić (born 1969), a Bosnian-Herzegovinian former footballer
- Ševko Okić (born 1988), a Bosnian professional footballer
