= Angelo Vaccaro =

German-born Italian footballer (born 1981)

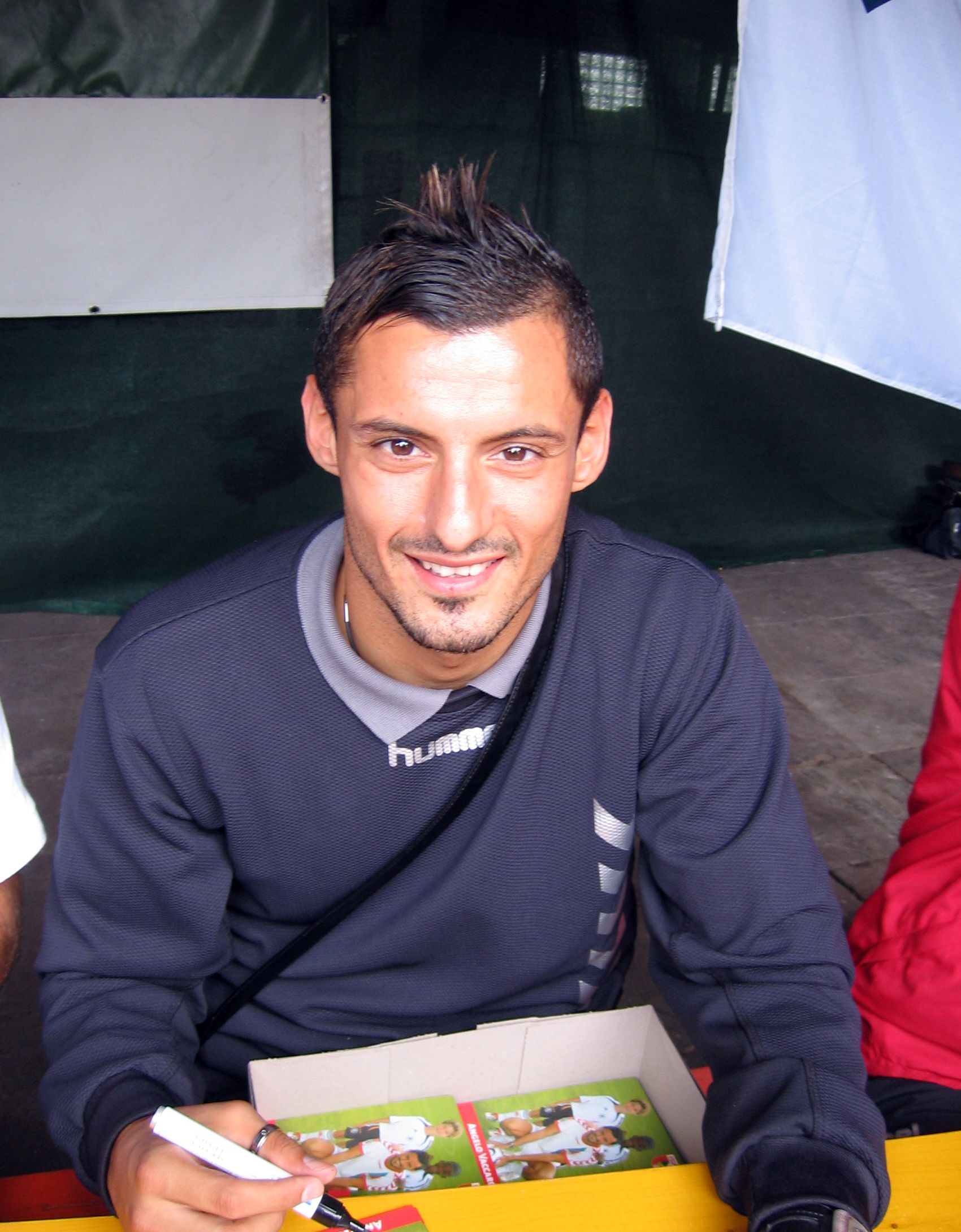

Personal information
- Date of birth: 4 October 1981 (age 45)
- Place of birth: Tübingen, Germany
- Height: 1.84 m (6 ft 0 in)
- Position: Striker

Youth career
- 1988–1993: SpVgg Mössingen
- 1993–2000: VfB Stuttgart

Senior career*
Years	Team	Apps	(Gls)
2000–2002	VfB Stuttgart II	54	(16)
2000–2001	VfB Stuttgart	1	(0)
2002–2005	SpVgg Unterhaching	40	(10)
2005–2006	FC Augsburg	21	(4)
2007–2008	Stuttgarter Kickers	58	(20)
2008–2009	Eintracht Frankfurt II	14	(9)
2010	Budapest Honvéd FC	6	(4)
2010–2011	Sorrento	8	(0)
2011	→ Brussels (loan)	1	(0)
2011–2012	SSV Reutlingen	19	(12)
2012–2014	SV Elversberg	41	(10)
2014–2016	FC Homburg	28	(6)
2016–2017	Borussia Spiesen	11	(14)
2017–2018	SV Saar 05	0	(0)
- * Club domestic league appearances and goals as of 1 August 2018

Angelo Vaccaro (born 4 October 1981) is a retired Italian footballer.

== Career ==
Born in Tübingen, he made his debut on the professional league level in the Bundesliga for VfB Stuttgart on 2 December 2000 when came on as a substitute for Ioan Viorel Ganea in the 72nd minute of a game against Borussia Dortmund.

In the 2010–11 season, he left for Italian side Sorrento after a six-month spell in Hungary.
