= Jan Männer =

German footballer (1982–2022)

Personal information
- Date of birth: 27 August 1982
- Place of birth: Emmendingen, West Germany
- Date of death: 26 September 2022 (aged 40)
- Height: 1.80 m (5 ft 11 in)
- Position: Midfielder

Youth career
- FC Emmendingen
- –1996: Bahlinger SC

Senior career*
Years	Team	Apps	(Gls)
1996–2003	SC Freiburg	25	(1)
2003–2007	Karlsruher SC	108	(6)
2007	SC Paderborn	7	(0)
Total		140	(7)

International career
2002–2003	Germany U-21	2	(0)
- * Club domestic league appearances and goals

Jan Männer (27 August 1982 – 26 September 2022) was a German former professional footballer who played as a midfielder.

He died on 26 September 2022, at the age of 40.
