= Christos Kagiouzis =

Greek footballer

Personal information
- Full name: Christos Kagiouzis
- Date of birth: 23 February 1981 (age 45)
- Place of birth: Offenbach, Germany
- Height: 1.85 m (6 ft 1 in)
- Position: Defensive midfielder

Senior career*
Years	Team	Apps	(Gls)
2001–2003	Kickers Offenbach	30	(2)
2003	Skoda Xanthi	6	(0)
2004	Eschborn	5	(0)
2005	Kastoria	1	(0)
2006–2008	Kerkyra	72	(4)
2008–2009	Kavala	23	(1)
2009–2010	Ethnikos Asteras	29	(4)
2010–2011	Veria	8	(0)
- * Club domestic league appearances and goals

Christos Kagiouzis (Greek: Χρήστος Καγκιούζης; born 23 February 1981) is a German footballer of Greek origins. He is a defensive midfielder who plays for Veria F.C. in the Football League (Greece).

== Career ==
Born in Offenbach, Germany, Kagiouzis began his career with local side Kickers Offenbach.
