= Wersestadion =

Football stadium in Ahlen, Germany

Coordinates: 51°45′12″N 7°54′18″E

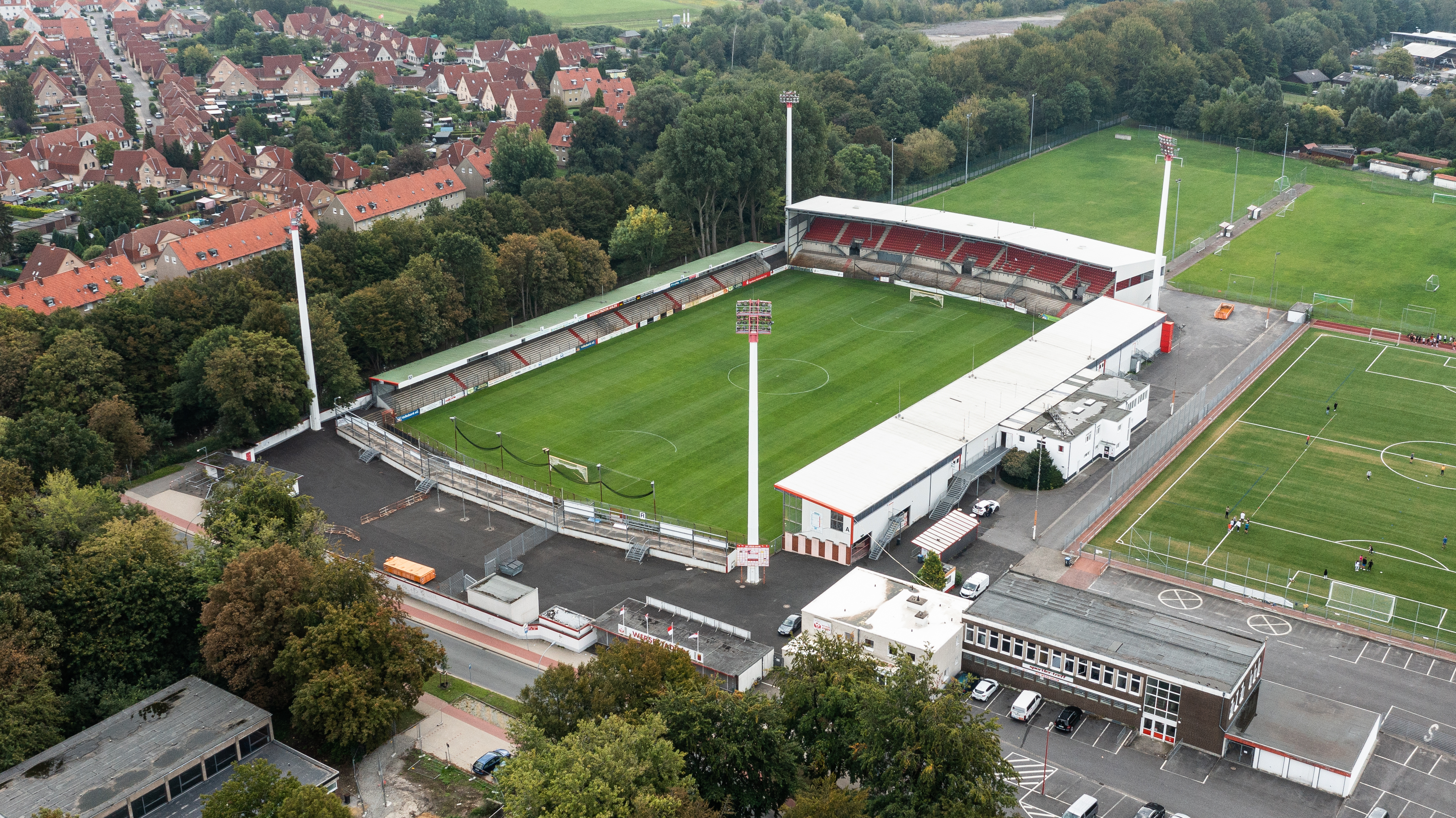
- Interactive map of Wersestadion
- Location: Ahlen, Germany
- Owner: Town Ahlen
- Capacity: 12,500

Construction
- Opened: 21 August 1949
- Renovated: 2009

Tenant
- Rot Weiss Ahlen

Not to be confused for the Weserstadion, in Bremen.

The Wersestadion is a multi-use stadium in Ahlen, Germany. It is currently used mostly for football matches and is the home stadium of Rot Weiss Ahlen. The stadium is able to hold 12,500 people and was built in 1997.
