= Sasa Radulovic (footballer, born 1978) =

Bosnian-Herzegovinian Australian soccer player

Personal information
- Full name: Saša Radulović
- Date of birth: July 31, 1978 (age 48)
- Place of birth: Zenica, SFR Yugoslavia
- Height: 1.78 m (5 ft 10 in)
- Position: Attacking midfielder

Youth career
- 1995–1996: Čelik Zenica
- 1996–1997: SV Concordia Ihrhove
- 1997–1999: SV Großefehn

Senior career*
Years	Team	Apps	(Gls)
1999–2000	Brisbane Strikers	0	(0)
2000–2002	Marconi Stallions	31	(3)
2002–2004	Rot-Weiß Oberhausen	68	(20)
2004-2005	LR Ahlen	7	(0)
2005	→ Lillestrøm (loan)	6	(1)
2005–2006	FC Augsburg	16	(1)
2006	Brisbane Wolves		
2007	Čelik Zenica	0	(0)
2007–2008	→ Újpest (loan)	19	(1)
2008–2015	Wolves FC		
2015–2016	Albany Creek Excelsior	33	(4)
2016–2017	Souths United	16	(1)
- * Club domestic league appearances and goals as of 4 October 2017

Sasa Radulovic (Serbian pronunciation: [sâʃa radǔːloʋit͡ɕ]; born July 31, 1978, in Zenica) is an Australian footballer who plays as a midfielder. He is the son of Rade Radulović, a famous Yugoslav football player.

== Club career ==
Born in Zenica, in the former Yugoslavia, Radulovic moved to Germany aged 15 and then spent two years in the Australian NSL with Brisbane Strikers and Marconi Stallions.

== External sources ==
- Sasa Radulovic at Soccerway (archived)
- Sasa Radulovic at WorldFootball.net
