= Christoph Teinert =

German footballer

Chris Teinert
Personal information
- Full name: Christoph Teinert
- Date of birth: 30 January 1980 (age 46)
- Place of birth: Heidelberg, Germany
- Height: 1.80 m (5 ft 11 in)
- Position: Striker

Youth career
- –1989: TSV Rheinhausen
- 1989–1997: SV 98 Schwetzingen
- 1998–1999: VfR Mannheim

Senior career*
Years	Team	Apps	(Gls)
1999–2000	VfB Leimen		
2000–2003	TSG 1899 Hoffenheim	91	(33)
2003–2005	1. FSV Mainz 05	36	(5)
2005–2006	SpVgg Unterhaching	42	(8)
2007	FC Augsburg	11	(1)
2007–2008	SV Wacker Burghausen	24	(6)
2008–2009	VfR Aalen	14	(0)
- * Club domestic league appearances and goals as of 19:34, 9 February 2009 (UTC)

Christoph Teinert (born 30 January 1980 in Heidelberg) is a German football player, who last played for VfR Aalen.

== Career ==
Teinert spent one season in the Bundesliga with 1. FSV Mainz 05.

== Personal life ==
He also holds Australian citizenship.
