= Branko Okić =

Bosnia and Herzegovina footballer and coach

Personal information
- Date of birth: February 16, 1969 (age 57)
- Place of birth: Kreševo, Yugoslavia
- Height: 1.73 m (5 ft 8 in)
- Position: Midfielder

Senior career*
Years	Team	Apps	(Gls)
–1995	FK Sarajevo	0	(0)
1995–2002	VfR Aalen	97+	(14+)
2002–2004	Rot-Weiß Erfurt	69	(9)
2004	1. FC Heidenheim 1846	0	(0)
2005–2009	VfR Aalen	117	(14)
2008–2009	VfR Aalen II	5	(1)
Total		288	(38)

Managerial career
- 2009–2011: VfR Aalen II (assistant)
- 2015–2016: SV Ebnat
- 2017: TuRa Untermünkheim
- 2017–2020: DJK-SG Schwabsberg-Buch
- 2020-2021: CSKA Sofia (assistant)
- 2023-: SV Pfahlheim
- * Club domestic league appearances and goals as of 29 December 2008

Branko Okić (born February 16, 1969) is a Bosnian-Herzegovinian former footballer who played as a midfielder.

== Playing career ==
Okić spent the majority of his career in the German lower leagues.

== Managerial career ==
After coaching German amateur sides SV Ebnat, TuRa Untermünkheim and DJK Schwabsberg, he was appointed assistant to head coach Bruno Akrapović at Bulgarian club CSKA Sofia in November 2011.
