= Daniel Bärwolf =

German footballer

Personal information
- Date of birth: 13 May 1973 (age 53)
- Place of birth: Erfurt, East Germany
- Height: 1.82 m (6 ft 0 in)
- Position: Striker

Youth career
- Empor Walschleben
- –1991: SC 1903 Weimar

Senior career*
Years	Team	Apps	(Gls)
1991–1992	SC 1903 Weimar	33	(14)
1992–1994	Rot-Weiß Erfurt		
1994–1996	VfB Leipzig	49	(8)
1996–1997	Rot-Weiß Erfurt	28	(18)
1997–1998	Carl Zeiss Jena	17	(1)
1998–2007	VfB Lübeck	247	(97)
2007–2011	Wacker Gotha		
- * Club domestic league appearances and goals

Daniel Bärwolf (born 13 May 1973) is a German former professional footballer who played as a striker.
