= Ahmet Kuru =

Turkish footballer

Personal information
- Date of birth: 23 April 1982 (age 44)
- Place of birth: Rotenburg an der Wümme, West Germany
- Height: 1.78 m (5 ft 10 in)
- Position: Striker

Youth career
- –1997: Rotenburger SV
- 1997–2001: Werder Bremen

Senior career*
Years	Team	Apps	(Gls)
2001–2004	Werder Bremen II	66	(22)
2004–2006	Eintracht Braunschweig	80	(31)
2006–2008	FC St. Pauli	20	(3)
2008–2010	Antalyaspor	23	(2)
2010–2011	Orduspor	14	(4)
2011–2012	Bozüyükspor	27	(10)
2012–2014	Bandirmaspor	47	(19)
2014–2015	Pazarspor	28	(8)
2015–2016	Orduspor	18	(2)
Total		323	(101)
- * Club domestic league appearances and goals

Ahmet Kuru (born 23 April 1982) is a Turkish former professional footballer who played as a striker.

After coming through Werder Bremen's youth system, he played for the club's reserves, Eintracht Braunschweig, and FC St. Pauli. He went on to spend the rest of his career in Turkey.
