= Alexander Löbe =

German footballer

Personal information
- Date of birth: 13 November 1972 (age 53)
- Place of birth: Jena, Germany
- Position: Forward

Senior career*
Years	Team	Apps	(Gls)
1990–1992	Hallescher FC	21	(3)
1992–1993	SpVgg Unterhaching	24	(9)
1993–1994	SG Wattenscheid 09	36	(2)
1994–1996	MSV Duisburg	41	(6)
1996–1997	VfB Lübeck	19	(4)
1997–1999	FC Gütersloh 2000	7	(1)
1999	SK Vorwärts Steyr	12	(2)
1999–2000	Erzurumspor	30	(13)
2000–2001	Trabzonspor	11	(4)
2001–2002	Malatyaspor	26	(3)
2002–2004	SG Wattenscheid 09	61	(36)
2004–2005	SC Paderborn	36	(17)
2005–2007	Rot-Weiss Essen	35	(8)
2007	TuS Radevormwald		
2007–2008	SC Paderborn	26	(7)
- * Club domestic league appearances and goals

Alexander Löbe (born 13 November 1972) is a German former professional footballer who played as a forward. He now works as Team Head at Puma SE in his home country.

== Career ==
Löbe started his senior career with Hallescher FC in 1990. In 1999, he signed for Erzurumspor in the Turkish Süper Lig, where he made thirty-one appearances and scored fifteen goals. After that, he played for Turkish clubs Trabzonspor and Malatyaspor, and German clubs SG Wattenscheid 09, SC Paderborn 07, Rot-Weiss Essen, and TuS Radevormwald before retiring in 2008.
