= Veselin Popović =

Serbian footballer

Personal information
- Full name: Veselin Popović
- Date of birth: 1 July 1975 (age 51)
- Place of birth: Titov Vrbas, SR Serbia, SFR Yugoslavia
- Height: 1.82 m (6 ft 0 in)
- Position: Striker

Senior career*
Years	Team	Apps	(Gls)
1992–1995	Vrbas	64	(15)
1995–1998	Obilić	71	(25)
1998–1999	FSV Zwickau	42	(18)
1999–2000	Dynamo Dresden	19	(5)
2000–2001	Erzgebirge Aue	14	(4)
2001–2004	1. FC Schweinfurt 05	79	(36)
2004–2005	Wacker Burghausen	8	(1)
2005–2006	Wacker Burghausen II	10	(3)
2006–2007	Wehen Wiesbaden	19	(5)
2007–2008	Sportfreunde Siegen	27	(4)
Total		353	(116)
- * Club domestic league appearances and goals

Veselin Popović (Serbian Cyrillic: Веселин Поповић; born 1 July 1975) is a Serbian former professional footballer who played as a striker.

== Career ==
After starting out at his hometown club Vrbas, Popović was signed by Obilić in April 1995. He spent the next three years with the Vitezovi and won the championship title in the 1997–98 season, before moving abroad to Germany. Over the following decade, Popović played for numerous clubs, most notably FSV Zwickau and 1. FC Schweinfurt 05.

== Career statistics ==
Club	Season	League	
Club	Season	Apps	Goals
Obilić	1994–95	6	1
Obilić	1995–96	31	15
Obilić	1996–97	27	7
Obilić	1997–98	7	2
Obilić	Total	71	25

== Honours ==
Obilić

- First League of FR Yugoslavia: 1997–98
- FR Yugoslavia Cup: Runner-up 1994–95, 1997–98
