= Dmitrijus Guščinas =

Lithuanian footballer and manager

Personal information
- Date of birth: 12 December 1975 (age 50)
- Place of birth: Vilnius, Soviet Union
- Height: 1.87 m (6 ft 2 in)
- Position: Forward

Senior career*
Years	Team	Apps	(Gls)
1995–1997	Lokomotyvas Vilnius		
1997–1998	TuS Paderborn-Neuhaus	11	(0)
1998–1999	Sportfreunde Ricklingen		
1999–2003	Holstein Kiel	66	(33)
2003	VfL Osnabrück	10	(1)
2004–2005	VfB Stuttgart II	36	(9)
2005–2006	TuS Koblenz	38	(8)
2007–2010	Holstein Kiel	85	(24)
2010–2011	FC Sylt	32	(31)
2010–2012	VfR Neumünster	5	(0)

International career
2003–2005	Lithuania	5	(0)

Managerial career
- 2010–2011: FC Sylt (player-manager)
- * Club domestic league appearances and goals

Dmitrijus Guščinas (born 12 December 1975) is a Lithuanian former professional footballer who played as a forward.

== International career ==
Guščinas made five appearances for the Lithuania national team.
