= Veselin Gerov =

Bulgarian footballer

Personal information
- Full name: Veselin Petkov Gerov
- Date of birth: 7 May 1970 (age 56)
- Place of birth: Pleven, Bulgaria
- Height: 1.87 m (6 ft 2 in)
- Position: Striker

Senior career*
Years	Team	Apps	(Gls)
1988–1992	Spartak Pleven		
1992–1995	Etar		
1995	Botev Plovdiv	10	(3)
1996–1997	Lokomotiv Sofia	30	(8)
1997–1998	SC Paderborn	35	(20)
1998–2000	LR Ahlen	40	(14)
2000–2004	SC Paderborn	123	(74)
2004–2005	Kickers Offenbach	27	(7)
2005–2006	SV Sandhausen	7	(2)
2006–2007	Hessen Kassel	11	(2)
2007	Goslarer SC		
2007–2008	BV Bad Lippspringe		
- * Club domestic league appearances and goals

Veselin Petkov Gerov (Bulgarian: Веселин Петков Геров) (born 7 May 1970) is a Bulgarian former professional footballer who played as a striker, mostly in Germany.
