= 1998–99 Tennis Borussia Berlin season =

Tennis Borussia Berlin
1998–99 season
- Manager: Hermann Gerland (until 18 November 1998); Stanislav Levý (19 November 1998 – 23 March 1999); Winfried Schäfer (from 24 March 1999)
- Stadium: Mommsenstadion
- 2. Bundesliga: 6th
- DFB-Pokal: Quarter-finals
- Top goalscorer: League: Ilija Aračić (8); All: Kreso Kovacec (12)
- Highest home attendance: 10,800 (vs. SSV Ulm 1846)
- Lowest home attendance: 2,000 (vs. KFC Uerdingen 05, 1. FSV Mainz 05)
- Average home league attendance: 4,453

The 1998–99 season was the eighth time Tennis Borussia Berlin played in the 2. Fußball-Bundesliga, the second highest tier of the German football league system. After 34 league games, Tennis Borussia finished 6th. The club had a long run in the DFB-Pokal; making it to the quarter-finals where they lost 2–1 after extra time away to SV Werder Bremen. Ilija Aračić scored eight of the club's 47 league goals before his mid-season move to local rivals Hertha BSC.

== 1998–99 Tennis Borussia Berlin squad ==
No.	Pos.	Nation	Player
1	GK	(Federal Republic of Yugoslavia) YUG	Goran Ćurko
16	GK	(Germany) GER	Roman Görtz
—	DF	(Turkey) TUR	Müslüm Can
4	DF	(Tunisia) TUN	Fahed Dermech
6	DF	(Germany) GER	Olaf Kapagiannidis
5	DF	(Germany) GER	Jens Melzig
13	DF	(Federal Republic of Yugoslavia) YUG	Dejan Raičković
2	DF	(Germany) GER	Marko Tredup
3	DF	(Switzerland) SUI	Marco Walker
—	MF	(Federal Republic of Yugoslavia) YUG	Duško Adamović
8	MF	(Bosnia and Herzegovina) BIH	Bruno Akrapović
22	MF	(Germany) GER	Matthias Hamann
11	MF	(Turkey) TUR	Celaleddin Koçak
33	MF	(Slovakia) SVK	Ivan Kozák (from 1 March 1999)

No.	Pos.	Nation	Player
24	MF	(North Macedonia) MKD	Toni Mičevski
21	MF	(Germany) GER	Dirk Rehbein
30	MF	(North Macedonia) MKD	Goran Stankovski
20	MF	(Poland) POL	Zbigniew Szewczyk
18	MF	(Germany) GER	Niclas Weiland
—	FW	(Croatia) CRO	Ilija Aračić (until 31 December 1998)
10	FW	(Spain) ESP	Francisco Copado
32	FW	(Norway) NOR	Geir Frigård
7	FW	(Albania) ALB	Harun Isa
28	FW	(Germany) GER	Enrico Kern
9	FW	(Germany) GER	Kreso Kovacec
23	FW	(Germany) GER	Mike Lünsmann
12	FW	(Turkey) TUR	Faruk Namdar

== 1998–99 fixtures ==
31 July 1998 2. Bundesliga	FC St. Pauli	1–0	Tennis Borussia Berlin	Millerntor-Stadion, Hamburg
19:00	Mason 68'; Chmielewski (yellow card) Drobné (yellow card)	Report	Dermech (yellow card) Hamann (yellow card)	Attendance: 15,100; Referee: Franz-Xaver Wack (Biberbach)

9 August 1998 2. Bundesliga	Tennis Borussia Berlin	1–0	FC Energie Cottbus	Mommsenstadion, Berlin
15:00	Kovacec 70'; Copado (yellow card) Hamann (yellow card)	Report	Rath (yellow card) Heidrich (yellow card) Vural (yellow card)	Attendance: 6,000; Referee: Jürgen Jansen (Essen)

12 August 1998 2. Bundesliga	Rot-Weiß Oberhausen	0–2	Tennis Borussia Berlin	Niederrheinstadion, Oberhausen
19:00	Ciuca (yellow card) Lipinski (yellow card)	Report	Copado 55'; Kovacec 66'; Kovacec (yellow card) Melzig (yellow card) Szewczyk (yellow card)	Attendance: 6,000; Referee: Juan-Carlos Ortolá-Knopp (Schwalbach)

15 August 1998 2. Bundesliga	Tennis Borussia Berlin	3–2	SC Fortuna Köln	Mommsenstadion, Berlin
15:30	Aračić 17', 57', 79'; Can (yellow card) Dermech (yellow card) Walker (yellow card)	Report	Brdarić 2'; Konetzke 55'; Dragóner (yellow card) Kranz (yellow card) Scholz (yellow card) Zernicke (yellow card)	Attendance: 3,100; Referee: Stephan Kammerer (Karlsruhe)

28 August 1998 DFB-Pokal – R1	Tennis Borussia Berlin	1–0	Hannover 96	Mommsenstadion, Berlin
19:00	Kovacec 40'; Aračić (yellow card) Akrapović (yellow card) Walker (yellow card) Namdar (yellow card)	Report	Kehl (yellow card) Kreuz (yellow card); Addo (yellow card) 66' (yellow-red card)	Attendance: 2,100; Referee: Wolfgang Stark (Landshut)

9 September 1998 2. Bundesliga	Fortuna Düsseldorf	2–2	Tennis Borussia Berlin	Rheinstadion, Düsseldorf
19:00	Tare 1', 69' (pen.); Addo (yellow card) Leśniak (yellow card)	Report	Kovacec 53'; Namdar 87'; Akrapović (yellow card) Kovacec (yellow card)	Attendance: 7,000; Referee: Volker Wezel (Tübingen)

13 September 1998 2. Bundesliga	Tennis Borussia Berlin	3–1	KFC Uerdingen 05	Mommsenstadion, Berlin
15:00	Melzig 22'; Aračić 25'; Szewczyk 75'; Akrapović (yellow card)	Report	von Ahlen 32'; Grauer (yellow card) Nikolic (yellow card) Spiżak (yellow card); Schmitz (red card) 65'	Attendance: 2,000; Referee: Peter Sippel (Munich)

18 September 1998 2. Bundesliga	Stuttgarter Kickers	1–0	Tennis Borussia Berlin	Waldau-Stadion, Stuttgart
19:00	Sebescen 70'; Kevric (yellow card) Malchow (yellow card) Sailer (yellow card)	Report	Akrapović (yellow card)	Attendance: 4,800; Referee: Dirk Margenberg (Wermelskirchen)

22 September 1998 DFB-Pokal – R2	Tennis Borussia Berlin	4–2	Stuttgarter Kickers	Mommsenstadion, Berlin
18:00	Kovacec 23', 26'; Copado 60'; Aračić 77'; Ćurko (yellow card) Raičković (yellow card)	Report	Carl 7'; Winkler 63'; Sebescen (yellow card) Ramovš (yellow card) Minkwitz (yellow card) Santl (yellow card)	Attendance: 2,000; Referee: Alfons Berg (Konz)

25 September 1998 2. Bundesliga	Tennis Borussia Berlin	2–0	FC Gütersloh	Mommsenstadion, Berlin
19:00	Kovacec 75'; Isa 83'; Namdar (yellow card)	Report	Bozinov (yellow card) Canale (yellow card) Choroba (yellow card); Landgraf (yellow card) Schürmann (yellow card)	Attendance: 2,900; Referee: Markus Schmidt (Stuttgart)

4 October 1998 2. Bundesliga	Tennis Borussia Berlin	2–1	SpVgg Greuther Fürth	Mommsenstadion, Berlin
15:00	Melzig 10'; Aračić 36'; Hamann (yellow card) Melzig (yellow card) Namdar (yellow card)	Report	Reichel 24'; Möckel (yellow card) 72' (yellow-red card)	Attendance: 2,400; Referee: Florian Meyer (Burgdorf)

16 October 1998 2. Bundesliga	SG Wattenscheid 09	0–1	Tennis Borussia Berlin	Lohrheidestadion, Bochum-Wattenscheid
19:00	Allievi (yellow card) Martin (yellow card) Schmugge (yellow card)	Report	Aračić 42'; Akrapović (yellow card) Can (yellow card) Melzig (yellow card) Raičković (yellow card) Szewczyk (yellow card)	Attendance: 2,400; Referee: Ralf Hilmes (Nordhorn)

25 October 1998 2. Bundesliga	Tennis Borussia Berlin	3–2	Karlsruher SC	Mommsenstadion, Berlin
15:00	Aračić 9'; Kovacec 27'; Hamann 43'; Hamann (yellow card)	Report	Krieg 30'; Guié-Mien 53'; Zeyer (yellow card) Meißner (yellow card) Schwarz (yellow card)	Attendance: 6,000; Referee: Detlef Scheppe (Wenden)

28 October 1998 DFB-Pokal – R3	Tennis Borussia Berlin	4–2	Hertha BSC	Olympiastadion, Berlin
19:30	Aračić 32', 59'; Copado 41'; Kovacec 57'; Melzig (yellow card)	Report	Thom 12'; Tchami 68'; Tretschok (yellow card) Wosz (yellow card) Rekdal (yellow card)	Attendance: 40,100; Referee: Jürgen Jansen (Essen)

2 November 1998 2. Bundesliga	Arminia Bielefeld	3–1	Tennis Borussia Berlin	Stadion Alm, Bielefeld
19:30	Rydlewicz 30'; Labbadia 43', 48'; Meißner (yellow card) Peeters (yellow card)	Report	Dermech 2'; Namdar (yellow card) Szewczyk (yellow card)	Attendance: 10,500; Referee: Detlef Schütz (Norken)

9 November 1998 2. Bundesliga	Tennis Borussia Berlin	1–1	1. FC Köln	Mommsenstadion, Berlin
19:30	Dermech 20'; Dermech (yellow card) Melzig (yellow card) Walker (yellow card)	Report	Bulajič 45'; Cichon (yellow card) Munteanu (yellow card)	Attendance: 2,700; Referee: Burkhard Hufgard (Mömbris)

13 November 1998 2. Bundesliga	SpVgg Unterhaching	3–1	Tennis Borussia Berlin	Sportpark Unterhaching, Unterhaching
19:00	Lust 6'; Rraklli 45'; Ahanfouf 90'; Ahanfouf (yellow card) Lust (yellow card) Oberleitner (yellow card) Rraklli (yellow card)	Report	Copado 33'; Raičković (yellow card); Copado (yellow card) 75' (yellow-red card)	Attendance: 3,100; Referee: Manfred Haupt (Mainz)

22 November 1998 2. Bundesliga	Tennis Borussia Berlin	3–1	Hannover 96	Mommsenstadion, Berlin
15:00	Mičevski 7'; Walker 37'; Kovacec 45'; Akrapović (yellow card) Aračić (yellow card) Dermech (yellow card); Kovacec (yellow card) Raičković (yellow card) Tredup (yellow card)	Report	Hecking 63'; Linke (yellow card) Lala (yellow card) Addo (yellow card)	Attendance: 3,000; Referee: Frank Gettke (Haltern)

29 November 1998 2. Bundesliga	SSV Ulm 1846	2–0	Tennis Borussia Berlin	Donaustadion, Ulm
15:00	Coulibaly 81'; Rösler 90'; Rösler (yellow card) Widmayer (yellow card) Zdrilic (yellow card)	Report	Copado 33'; Copado (yellow card) Ćurko (yellow card) Hamann (yellow card) Raičković (yellow card); Walker (red card) 73'	Attendance: 13,000; Referee: Herbert Fandel (Kyllburg)

2 December 1998 DFB-Pokal – QF	SV Werder Bremen	2–1 (a.e.t.)	Tennis Borussia Berlin	Weserstadion, Bremen
19:30	Flo 86'; Wojtala 107'; Wojtala (yellow card)	Report	Kovacec 10'; Raičković (yellow card) Weiland (yellow card) Copado (yellow card); Hamann (yellow card) Akrapović (yellow card)	Attendance: 9,900; Referee: Hermann Albrecht (Kaufbeuren)

6 December 1998 2. Bundesliga	Tennis Borussia Berlin	3–0	1. FSV Mainz 05	Mommsenstadion, Berlin
15:00	Mičevski 6'; Lünsmann 59'; Aračić 83'; Akrapović (yellow card)	Report	Neustädter (yellow card)	Attendance: 2,000; Referee: Thorsten Kinhöfer (Herne)

18 December 1998 2. Bundesliga	FC Energie Cottbus	2–2	Tennis Borussia Berlin	Stadion der Freundschaft, Cottbus
19:00	Helbig 87', 89'; Helbig (yellow card) Zöphel (yellow card); Rath (red card) 68'	Report	Kovacec 33'; Mičevski 57'; Can (yellow card) Dermech (yellow card) Kovacec (yellow card) Walker (yellow card); Raičković (red card) 68' Tredup (yellow card) 89' (yellow-red card)	Attendance: 5,600; Referee: Winfried Buchhart (Schrobenhausen)

28 February 1999 2. Bundesliga	Tennis Borussia Berlin	2–2	Rot-Weiß Oberhausen	Mommsenstadion, Berlin
15:00	Frigård 72'; Lünsmann 73'; Akrapović (yellow card) Raičković (yellow card)	Report	Pröpper 45'; Weber 52'; Bieber (yellow card) Quallo (yellow card)	Attendance: 4,500; Referee: Manfred Haupt (Mainz)

4 March 1999 2. Bundesliga	Tennis Borussia Berlin	0–2	FC St. Pauli	Mommsenstadion, Berlin
18:45	Can (yellow card) Copado (yellow card) Ćurko (yellow card) Melzig (yellow card); Dermech (red card) 78'	Report	Trulsen 45' (pen.); Marin 83'; Hanke (yellow card) Marin (yellow card) Scherz (yellow card) Seeliger (yellow card) Trulsen (yellow card)	Attendance: 4,600; Referee: Lange (Herrenberg)

7 March 1999 2. Bundesliga	SC Fortuna Köln	1–3	Tennis Borussia Berlin	Südstadion, Cologne
15:00	Younga-Mouhani 43'; Dragóner (yellow card)	Report	Copado 27', 60'; Koçak 90'; Ćurko (yellow card) Hamann (yellow card) Lünsmann (yellow card) Tredup (yellow card); Walker (red card) 67'	Attendance: 3,000; Referee: Thorsten Kinhöfer (Herne)

14 March 1999 2. Bundesliga	Tennis Borussia Berlin	1–1	Fortuna Düsseldorf	Mommsenstadion, Berlin
15:00	Lünsmann 25'	Report	Cartus 57'; Addo (yellow card) Jurić (yellow card) Pirvu (yellow card)	Attendance: 4,100; Referee: Christian Schößling (Leipzig)

19 March 1999 2. Bundesliga	KFC Uerdingen 05	2–3	Tennis Borussia Berlin	Grotenburg-Stadion, Krefeld
19:00	Kushev 2', 15'; Tomčić (yellow card) 68' (yellow-red card)	Report	Frigård 29', 49'; Mičevski 88'; Akrapović (yellow card) Melzig (yellow card) Mičevski (yellow card)	Attendance: 4,000; Referee: Knut Kircher (Rottenburg am Neckar)

1 April 1999 2. Bundesliga	Tennis Borussia Berlin	0–2	Stuttgarter Kickers	Mommsenstadion, Berlin
19:00	Raičković (yellow card)	Report	Marić 1'; Sebescen 78'; Carl (yellow card)	Attendance: 4,000; Referee: Ralf Hilmes (Nordhorn)

11 April 1999 2. Bundesliga	FC Gütersloh	1–0	Tennis Borussia Berlin	Heidewaldstadion, Gütersloh
15:00	Elberfeld 62'; Elberfeld (yellow card) Halat (yellow card)	Report	Dermech (yellow card) Frigård (yellow card) Isa (yellow card) Kozák (yellow card) Tredup (yellow card)	Attendance: 7,500; Referee: Florian Meyer (Burgdorf)

18 April 1999 2. Bundesliga	SpVgg Greuther Fürth	1–2	Tennis Borussia Berlin	Ronhof-Stadion, Fürth
15:00	Škarabela 52'; Felgenhauer (yellow card); Škarabela (red card) 72'	Report	Can 64'; Radoki 89' (o.g.); Hamann (yellow card) Kern (yellow card) 45' (yellow-red card)	Attendance: 9,100; Referee: Christian Wack (Gersheim)

25 April 1999 2. Bundesliga	Tennis Borussia Berlin	1–0	SG Wattenscheid 09	Mommsenstadion, Berlin
15:00	Tredup 39'; Mičevski (yellow card) Walker (yellow card)	Report	Feinbier (yellow card)	Attendance: 4,600; Referee: Peter Gagelmann (Bremen)

3 May 1999 2. Bundesliga	Karlsruher SC	0–0	Tennis Borussia Berlin	Wildparkstadion, Karlsruhe
20:15	Schwarz (yellow card)	Report	Weiland (yellow card) Szewczyk (yellow card)	Attendance: 18,200; Referee: Wolfgang Friedrichs (Lennestadt)

10 May 1999 2. Bundesliga	Tennis Borussia Berlin	1–1	Arminia Bielefeld	Mommsenstadion, Berlin
20:15	Walker 14'; Melzig (yellow card)	Report	Böhme 37'; Hofschneider (yellow card) Peeters (yellow card) Rydlewicz (yellow card) Stratos (yellow card)	Attendance: 7,000; Referee: Bernhard Zerr (Ottersweier)

16 May 1999 2. Bundesliga	1. FC Köln	1–0	Tennis Borussia Berlin	Müngersdorfer Stadion, Cologne
15:00	Wollitz 50'; Cichon (yellow card)	Report	Walker (yellow card)	Attendance: 10,000; Referee: Knut Kircher (Rottenburg am Neckar)

24 May 1999 2. Bundesliga	Tennis Borussia Berlin	1–1	SpVgg Unterhaching	Mommsenstadion, Berlin
20:15	Strehmel 22' (o.g.); Akrapović (yellow card) Melzig (yellow card) Szewczyk (yellow card)	Report	Strehmel 85'	Attendance: 6,000; Referee: Bernd Hauer (Celle)

30 May 1999 2. Bundesliga	Hannover 96	0–0	Tennis Borussia Berlin	Eilenriedestadion, Hanover
15:00	Blank (yellow card) Lala (yellow card)	Report	Copado (yellow card) Ćurko (yellow card) Melzig (yellow card) Weiland (yellow card) Tredup (yellow card); Dermech (yellow card) 45' (yellow-red card) Hamann (yellow card) 55' (yellow-red card)	Attendance: 48,000; Referee: Volker Wezel (Tübingen)

13 June 1999 2. Bundesliga	Tennis Borussia Berlin	0–2	SSV Ulm 1846	Mommsenstadion, Berlin
15:00	Koçak (yellow card) Tredup (yellow card)	Report	Ćurko 66' (o.g.); Coulibaly 71'; Coulibaly (yellow card) Stadler (yellow card)	Attendance: 10,800; Referee: Thorsten Kinhöfer (Herne)

17 June 1999 2. Bundesliga	1. FSV Mainz 05	0–3	Tennis Borussia Berlin	Stadion am Bruchweg, Mainz
19:00	Schmidt (yellow card)	Report	Frigård 1', 73'; Dermech 90'; Szewczyk (yellow card)	Attendance: 6,500; Referee: Frank Gettke (Haltern)

== Player statistics ==
Pos	Player	Apps	Goals	Apps	Goals	Apps	Goals
Pos	Player	2. Bundesliga		DFB-Pokal		Total	
MF	(Federal Republic of Yugoslavia) Duško Adamović	1	0	0	0	1	0
MF	(Bosnia and Herzegovina) Bruno Akrapović	32	0	4	0	36	0
FW	(Croatia) Ilija Aračić	17	8	4	3	21	11
DF	(Turkey) Müslüm Can	26	1	4	0	30	1
FW	(Spain) Francisco Copado	31	4	3	2	34	6
GK	(Federal Republic of Yugoslavia) Goran Ćurko	33	0	4	0	37	0
DF	(Tunisia) Fahed Dermech	23	3	4	0	27	3
FW	(Norway) Geir Frigård	14	5	0	0	14	5
GK	(Germany) Roman Görtz	1	0	0	0	1	0
MF	(Germany) Matthias Hamann	32	1	3	0	35	0
FW	(Albania) Harun Isa	14	1	2	0	16	1
DF	(Germany) Olaf Kapagiannidis	13	0	2	0	15	0
FW	(Germany) Enrico Kern	4	0	1	0	5	0
MF	(Turkey) Celaleddin Koçak	15	1	1	0	16	1
FW	(Germany) Kreso Kovacec	19	7	4	5	23	12
MF	(Slovakia) Ivan Kozák	11	0	0	0	11	0
FW	(Germany) Mike Lünsmann	17	3	0	0	17	3
DF	(Germany) Jens Melzig	27	2	3	0	30	2
MF	(North Macedonia) Toni Mičevski	19	4	1	0	20	4
FW	(Turkey) Faruk Namdar	12	1	2	0	14	0
DF	(Federal Republic of Yugoslavia) Dejan Raičković	24	0	4	0	28	0
MF	(Germany) Dirk Rehbein	0	0	0	0	0	0
MF	(North Macedonia) Goran Stankovski	3	0	1	0	4	0
MF	(Poland) Zbigniew Szewczyk	26	1	4	0	30	1
DF	(Germany) Marko Tredup	18	1	1	0	19	1
DF	(Switzerland) Marco Walker	23	2	3	0	26	2
MF	(Germany) Niclas Weiland	13	0	1	0	14	0

== Final league position – 6th ==
1998–99 2. Fußball-Bundesliga: extract from the final league table
Pos	Team	Pld	W	D	L	GF	GA	GD	Points
1	Arminia Bielefeld (C)	34	20	7	7	62	32	+30	67
5	Karlsruher SC	34	17	5	12	54	43	+11	56
6	Tennis Borussia Berlin	34	15	9	10	47	39	+8	54
7	1. FSV Mainz 05	34	14	8	12	48	44	+4	50
18	Fortuna Düsseldorf (R)	34	5	13	16	35	59	−24	28
