= 1997–98 Regionalliga =

4th season of the Regionalliga as a third-level league

Regionalliga
- Season: 1997–98
- Promoted: Hannover 96 (N); Tennis Borussia Berlin (NO); Rot-Weiß Oberhausen (W/SW); SSV Ulm 1846 (S)
- Relegated: VfL 93 Hamburg; Atlas Delmenhorst; SC Göttingen 05; Hertha Zehlendorf; Reinickendorfer Füchse; Wacker Nordhausen; Hansa Rostock (A); Bonner SC; Rot-Weiss Essen; Germania Teveren; SV Darmstadt 98; VfL Kirchheim/Teck; Hessen Kassel
- Matches played: 1,190
- Goals scored: 3,676 (3.09 per match)
- Top goalscorer: Markus Erdmann (Arminia Hannover) - 34

The 1997–98 Regionalliga was the fourth season of the Regionalliga as the third tier of German football. The league was organised in four regional divisions, Nord, Nordost, West-Südwest and Süd.

Hannover 96, Tennis Borussia Berlin, Rot-Weiß Oberhausen and SSV Ulm 1846 were promoted to the 2. Bundesliga.

== North ==
=== Final table ===
Pos	Team	Pld	W	D	L	GF	GA	GD	Pts	Qualification or relegation
1	Hannover 96 (C, P)	34	28	5	1	120	29	+91	89	Qualification to promotion play-offs
2	Eintracht Braunschweig	34	26	4	4	70	24	+46	82	
3	VfL Osnabrück	34	18	12	4	70	28	+42	66	
4	SV Werder Bremen II	34	20	5	9	91	52	+39	65	
5	VfB Oldenburg	34	18	9	7	69	48	+21	63	
6	Arminia Hannover	34	16	8	10	65	45	+20	56	
7	VfB Lübeck	34	15	9	10	60	45	+15	54	
8	Kickers Emden	34	12	8	14	54	65	−11	44	
9	SV Wilhelmshaven	34	11	9	14	47	56	−9	42	
10	Eintracht Nordhorn	34	10	10	14	50	62	−12	40	
11	VfL 93 Hamburg (Note: VfL 93 Hamburg were demoted.) (R)	34	12	4	18	51	78	−27	40	Relegation to Oberliga
12	TuS Celle	34	10	9	15	50	68	−18	39	
13	Sportfreunde Ricklingen	34	10	7	17	40	59	−19	37	
14	Hamburger SV II	34	10	6	18	51	59	−8	36	
15	VfL Herzlake	34	8	9	17	39	71	−32	33	
16	1. SC Norderstedt	34	8	7	19	44	64	−20	31	
17	SV Atlas Delmenhorst (R)	34	5	6	23	37	83	−46	21	Relegation to Oberliga
18	Göttingen 05 (R)	34	2	7	25	35	107	−72	13	Relegation to Oberliga

(C) Champions; (P) Promoted; (R) Relegated

=== Top scorers ===
#	Player	Club	Goals
1.	(Germany) Markus Erdmann	Arminia Hannover	34
2.	(Germany) Sören Seidel	Werder Bremen (A)	27
3.	(Federal Republic of Yugoslavia) Vladan Milovanović	Hannover 96	22
4.	(Germany) Marinus Bester	VfL 93 Hamburg	20
5.	(Germany) Gerald Asamoah	Hannover 96	19
6.	(Federal Republic of Yugoslavia) Miloš Kolaković	Eintracht Braunschweig	18
7.	(Germany) Jürgen Degen	VfL 93 Hamburg; Hannover 96	17
7.	(Germany) Martin Przondziono	VfL Osnabrück	17
9.	(Albania) Muhamet Lajqi	Eintracht Nordhorn	15
10.	(Germany) Markus Burmeister	1. SC Norderstedt	14
10.	(Germany) Horst Elberfeld	VfB Oldenburg	14

== North-East ==
=== Final table ===
Pos	Team	Pld	W	D	L	GF	GA	GD	Pts	Qualification or relegation
1	Tennis Borussia Berlin (C, P)	34	29	5	0	86	7	+79	92	Qualification to promotion play-offs
2	Dynamo Dresden	34	17	9	8	60	39	+21	60	
3	Eisenhüttenstädter FC Stahl	34	17	6	11	68	55	+13	57	
4	FC Sachsen Leipzig	34	16	8	10	60	36	+24	56	
5	FC Rot-Weiß Erfurt	34	16	8	10	59	49	+10	56	
6	1. FC Union Berlin	34	15	9	10	46	36	+10	54	
7	Erzgebirge Aue	34	14	10	10	43	43	0	52	
8	Chemnitzer FC	34	14	9	11	54	36	+18	51	
9	Lok Altmark Stendal	34	15	6	13	50	56	−6	51	
10	VFC Plauen	34	13	9	12	55	51	+4	48	
11	FC Berlin	34	12	7	15	55	55	0	43	
12	1. FC Magdeburg	34	10	9	15	60	65	−5	39	
13	Spandauer SV	34	11	6	17	42	64	−22	39	
14	SV Babelsberg 03	34	10	8	16	33	50	−17	38	
15	Hertha Zehlendorf (R)	34	9	7	18	39	62	−23	34	Relegation to Oberliga
16	Reinickendorfer Füchse (R)	34	8	7	19	27	64	−37	31	Relegation to Oberliga
17	FSV Wacker 90 Nordhausen (R)	34	7	8	19	32	58	−26	29	Relegation to Oberliga
18	F.C. Hansa Rostock II (R)	34	5	5	24	34	77	−43	20	Relegation to Oberliga

(C) Champions; (P) Promoted; (R) Relegated

=== Top scorers ===
#	Player	Club	Goals
1.	(Germany) Rainer Wiedemann	Lok Altmark Stendal	25
2.	(Germany) Mike Lünsmann	FC Sachsen Leipzig / Tennis Borussia Berlin	18
3.	(Croatia) Ilija Aračić	Tennis Borussia Berlin	16
3.	(Germany) Torsten Gütschow	Dynamo Dresden	16
5.	(Germany) Rocco Milde	Dynamo Dresden	15
5.	(Germany) Mirko Ullmann	Chemnitzer FC	15
7.	(Germany) Mike Klenge	EFC Stahl	14
8.	(Spain) Francisco Copado	Tennis Borussia Berlin	12
8.	(Croatia) Kreso Kovacec	Tennis Borussia Berlin	12
8.	(Germany) Stephan Kuhlow	Hertha Zehlendorf	12
8.	(Germany) Nico Patschinski	1. FC Union Berlin; / SV Babelsberg 03	12

== West/South-West ==
=== Final table ===
Pos	Team	Pld	W	D	L	GF	GA	GD	Pts	Promotion or relegation
1	Rot-Weiß Oberhausen (C, P)	34	21	8	5	66	31	+35	71	Promotion to 2. Bundesliga
2	Sportfreunde Siegen	34	20	5	9	69	37	+32	65	Qualification to promotion play-offs
3	FC 08 Homburg	34	17	8	9	70	38	+32	59	
4	1. FC Saarbrücken	34	18	5	11	70	43	+27	59	
5	Eintracht Trier	34	14	12	8	56	41	+15	54	
6	LR Ahlen	34	13	12	9	62	52	+10	51	
7	Alemannia Aachen	34	13	10	11	62	46	+16	49	
8	Preußen Münster	34	13	10	11	57	48	+9	49	
9	SC Paderborn 07	34	12	12	10	61	37	+24	48	
10	SC Verl	34	13	8	13	52	56	−4	47	
11	1. FC Kaiserslautern II	34	12	10	12	45	46	−1	46	
12	Wuppertaler SV	34	11	10	13	49	58	−9	43	
13	FC Remscheid	34	10	8	16	40	55	−15	38	
14	FSV Salmrohr	34	10	7	17	33	66	−33	37	
15	SpVgg Erkenschwick	34	9	9	16	41	69	−28	36	
16	Bonner SC (R)	34	10	5	19	34	65	−31	35	Relegation to Oberliga
17	Rot-Weiss Essen (R)	34	7	9	18	41	80	−39	30	Relegation to Oberliga
18	FC Germania 1910 Teveren (R)	34	6	6	22	32	72	−40	24	Relegation to Oberliga

(C) Champions; (P) Promoted; (R) Relegated

=== Top scorers ===
#	Player	Club	Goals
1.	(Slovenia) Branko Zibert	1. FC Saarbrücken	20
2.	(Bulgaria) Veselin Petkov Gerov	SC Paderborn 07	19
3.	(Germany) Mario Krohm	Alemannia Aachen	18
3.	(Germany) Achim Weber	Rot-Weiß Oberhausen	18
5.	(Guinea) Taifour Diane	FC Homburg	16
6.	(Germany) Til Bettenstaedt	SC Verl	15
7.	(Germany) Marco Antwerpen	Preußen Münster	14
7.	(Nigeria) Sambo Choji	1. FC Saarbrücken	14
7.	(Germany) Uwe Klein	Sportfreunde Siegen	14
10.	(Germany) Rudi Thömmes	Eintracht Trier	13

== South ==
=== Final table ===
Pos	Team	Pld	W	D	L	GF	GA	GD	Pts	Promotion or relegation
1	SSV Ulm 1846 (C, P)	32	18	6	8	63	36	+27	60	Promotion to 2. Bundesliga
2	Kickers Offenbach	32	17	8	7	56	37	+19	59	Qualification to promotion play-offs
3	Borussia Fulda	32	17	6	9	52	46	+6	57	
4	SSV Reutlingen	32	15	10	7	50	30	+20	55	
5	Wacker Burghausen	32	15	9	8	56	34	+22	54	
6	FC Bayern Munich II	32	15	3	14	45	44	+1	48	
7	SV Waldhof Mannheim	32	12	11	9	46	40	+6	47	
8	Karlsruher SC II	32	14	5	13	41	52	−11	47	
9	TSV 1860 Munich II	32	11	10	11	51	43	+8	43	
10	FC Augsburg	32	10	12	10	51	47	+4	42	
11	SC Weismain	32	10	10	12	42	48	−6	40	
12	TSF 1893 Ditzingen	32	10	8	14	36	47	−11	38	
13	SV Wehen	32	9	8	15	50	56	−6	35	
14	VfR Mannheim	32	8	11	13	37	48	−11	35	
15	SC Neukirchen 1899	32	8	9	15	45	56	−11	33	
16	Darmstadt 98 (R)	32	8	9	15	38	57	−19	33	Relegation to Oberliga
17	VfL Kirchheim unter Teck (R)	32	3	9	20	31	69	−38	18	Relegation to Oberliga

(C) Champions; (P) Promoted; (R) Relegated

NB KSV Hessen Kassel were declared bankrupt mid-season and all results were therefore annulled.

=== Top scorers ===
#	Player	Club	Goals
1.	(Germany) Dieter Eckstein	FC Augsburg	21
2.	(Federal Republic of Yugoslavia) Dragan Trkulja	SSV Ulm 1846	19
3.	(Croatia) Marko Barlecaj	Wacker Burghausen / 1860 Munich (A)	18
4.	(Germany) Marco Fladung	Borussia Fulda	17
4.	(Germany) Sascha Licht	SC Weismain	17
6.	(Germany) Oliver Roth	Kickers Offenbach	16
7.	(Cameroon) Olivier Djappa	Borussia Fulda	15
8.	(Germany) Michael Mayer	KSSV Reutlingen	14
9.	(Albania) Artur Maxhuni	SV Wehen	13
9.	(Nigeria) Amaechi Ottiji	SV Darmstadt 98	13
9.	(Germany) Thomas Winter	Kickers Offenbach / SSV Reutlingen	13

== Promotion playoffs ==
A preliminary decider was contested between the champions of the North and North-East regions. Hannover 96 won on penalties and so were promoted to the 2. Bundesliga.

Team 1	Agg.	Team 2	1st leg	2nd leg
Tennis Borussia Berlin (NE)	2–2 (1–3 pen)	Hannover 96 (N)	2–0	0–2 aet (1–3 pen)

The loser of the above tie faced the 2nd placed teams from the South and West/South-West regions for a final promotion place.

Team 1	Score	Team 2
Sportfreunde Siegen (SW)	4–0	Kickers Offenbach (S)

Team 1	Score	Team 2
Kickers Offenbach (S)	1–2	Tennis Borussia Berlin (NE)

Team 1	Score	Team 2
Tennis Borussia Berlin (NE)	2–0	Sportfreunde Siegen (SW)

Pos	Team	Pld	W	D	L	GF	GA	GD	Pts
1	Tennis Borussia Berlin	2	2	0	0	4	1	+3	6
2	Sportfreunde Siegen	2	1	0	1	4	2	+2	3
3	Kickers Offenbach	2	0	0	2	1	6	−5	0

Tennis Borussia Berlin were promoted to the 2. Bundesliga.

== Top goalscorer ==
- Rainer Wiedemann (FSV Lok Altmark Stendal) – 25 goals
