= Hermann Gerland =

German football manager (1954)

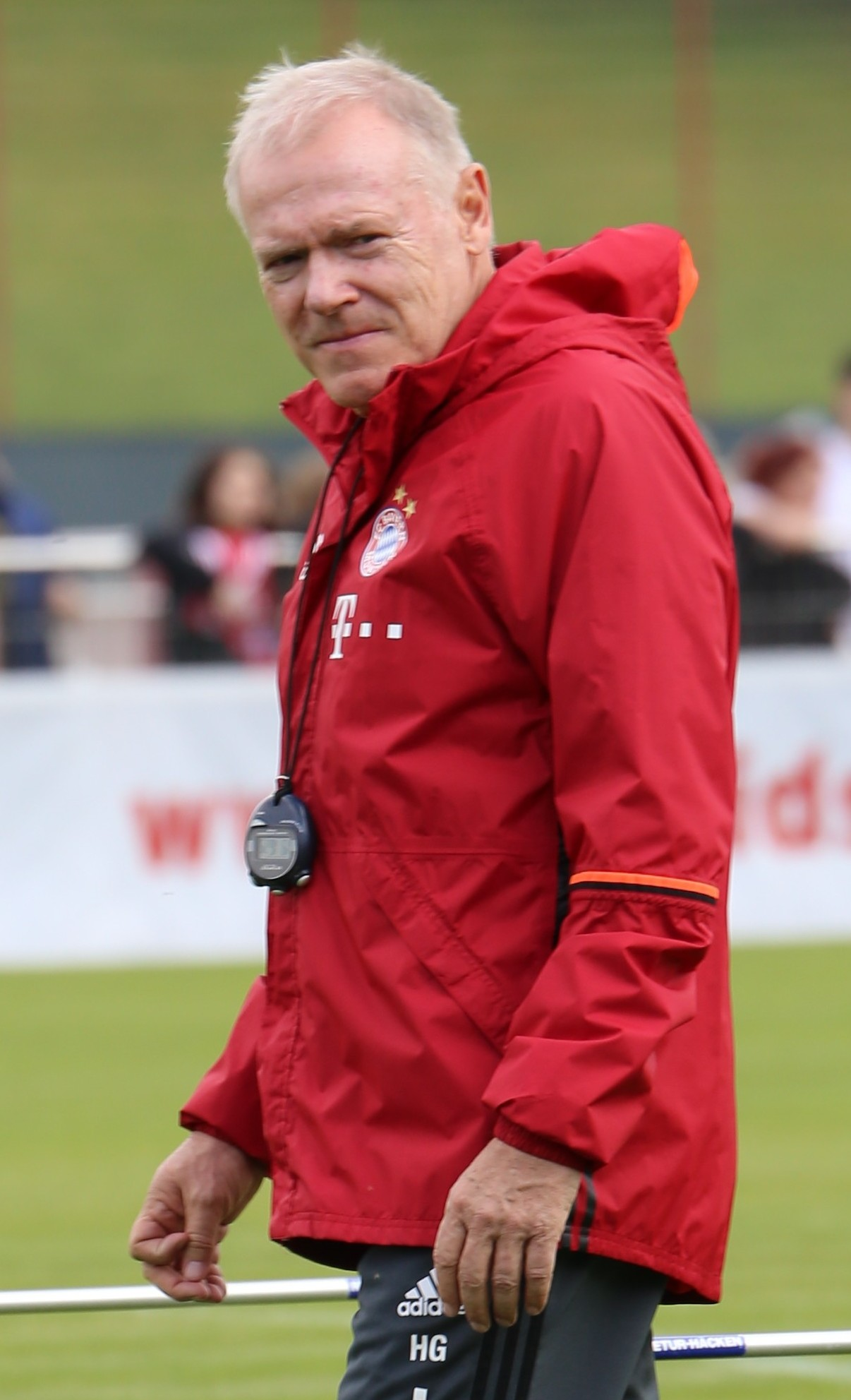
- Gerland as assistant coach for Bayern Munich in 2017

Personal information
- Full name: Hermann Gerland
- Date of birth: 4 June 1954 (age 72)
- Place of birth: Bochum, West Germany
- Height: 1.78 m (5 ft 10 in)
- Positions: Defender; striker

Youth career
- –1968: Westfalia Weitmar
- 1968–1972: VfL Bochum

Senior career*
| Years | Team | Apps | (Gls) |
| 1972–1984 | VfL Bochum | 204 | (4) |
| 1984–1985 | VfL Bochum II | | |

Managerial career
- 1984–1985: VfL Bochum (assistant)
- 1986–1988: VfL Bochum
- 1988–1990: 1. FC Nürnberg
- 1990–1995: Bayern Munich Amateurs
- 1995–1996: 1. FC Nürnberg
- 1997–1998: Tennis Borussia Berlin
- 1999–2000: Arminia Bielefeld
- 2000–2001: SSV Ulm 1846
- 2001–2009: Bayern Munich II
- 2009–2010: Bayern Munich (assistant)
- 2010–2011: Bayern Munich II
- 2011–2018: Bayern Munich (assistant)
- 2019–2021: Bayern Munich (assistant)
- 2021–2025: Germany U21 (assistant)
- 2022: Germany (assistant)
- * Club domestic league appearances and goals

Hermann "Tiger" Gerland (born 4 June 1954) is a German former professional football manager and player who has most recently worked as an assistant coach of Germany's U21.

== Playing career ==
Born in Bochum, Gerland spent his entire professional career from 1972 to 1984 playing at VfL Bochum. He played as a striker until 1975, when he switched to defence, where he played until the end of his career. He made 204 Bundesliga appearances and scored four goals.

== Managerial career ==
=== 1985–1990: Early career ===
Gerland's career as manager began in 1985 as the assistant manager at VfL Bochum. In 1986 Gerland took over as manager from Rolf Schafstall at VfL Bochum. The tenure lasted from 1 July 1986 to 30 June 1988. Bochum finished in 11th place in the 1986–87 season. They were eliminated in the first round of the German Cup. Bochum finished in 12th place during the 1987–88 season. They also got to the final of the German Cup where they lost to Eintracht Frankfurt 1–0. In 1988, he made a switch within the Bundesliga and became coach of 1. FC Nürnberg, where he stayed until 1990. Nürnberg finished the 1988–89 season in 14th place. They were eliminated by Karlsruher SC in the German Cup second round and eliminated in the first round of the UEFA Cup by Roma after winning 4–3 on aggregate. Nürnberg won the first leg 2–1 and lost the second leg 3–1. He left Nürnberg on 9 April 1990 and had his last match, a 1–1 draw against Waldhof Mannheim, on 7 April 1990. were in ninth place at the time he left the club. He finished with a record of 19 wins, 21 draws, and 28 losses.

=== 1990–1995: Bayern Munich (A) ===
Beginning with the 1990–91 season, he concurrently coached Bayern Munich Amateure as well as Bayern Munich Juniors. In 1991, he quit the Juniors. He continued coaching the amateurs until 1995. In addition, Gerland was the assistant manager of FC Bayern during the 1991–92 season.

=== 1995–2001: Tenure in the Regionalliga and 2. Bundesliga ===
In the 1995–96 season, he again coached Nürnberg, who were playing in the 2. Bundesliga. Gerland left the on 30 April 1996. His final match was a 2–2 draw against Hannover 96 on 29 April 1996. He finished with a record of nine wins, 12 draws, and nine losses.

He managed Tennis Borussia Berlin from 22 October 1996 to 18 November 1998. When Gerland took over Tennis Borussia Berlin, they were in seventh place. They finished the 1996–97 season in sixth place. Tennis Borussia Berlin were promoted to the 2. Bundesliga after the 1997–98 season after they finished in first place. They went undefeated through the 1997–98 season with a record of 29 wins and seven draws. He left the club during the 1998–99 season and had his final match on 13 November 1998, a 3–1 loss to SpVgg Unterhaching. They were in fifth place when he left the club. During the 1998–99 season, Gerland led Tennis Borussia Berlin to the quarter–finals of the German Cup after defeating Hannover 96, Stuttgarter Kickers, and Hertha BSC.

For the 1999–2000 season, Gerland was the manager of Arminia Bielefeld, Gerland made his debut for the club on 7 August 1999 in a 2–0 win against Dynamo Berlin in the second round of the German Cup. Arminia Bielefeld finished the 1999–2000 season in 17th place and were relegated at the end of the season. Arminia Bielefeld started the 2000–01 season with five consecutive wins. However, Arminia Bielefeld failed to win another match under Gerland and Gerland left on 16 October 2000. He finished with a record of 14 wins, 11 draws, and 21 losses.

2. Bundesliga club SSV Ulm 1846 hired Gerland on 31 October 2000 for the remainder of the season. The club was in 13th place when he took over as manager. Although hired on 31 October, Peter Assion managed the 2–0 German Cup win against Energie Cottbus on 1 November 2000 and made his debut in the 3–1 win against Alemannia Aachen on 5 November 2000. Ulm sacked Gerland on 21 March 2001. His final match was a 3–1 loss against Rot-Weiß Oberhausen on 17 March 2001. At the time of his sacking, Ulm was in the relegation zone at 16th place.

=== 2001–2021: Return to Bayern Munich ===
==== 2001–2005 ====
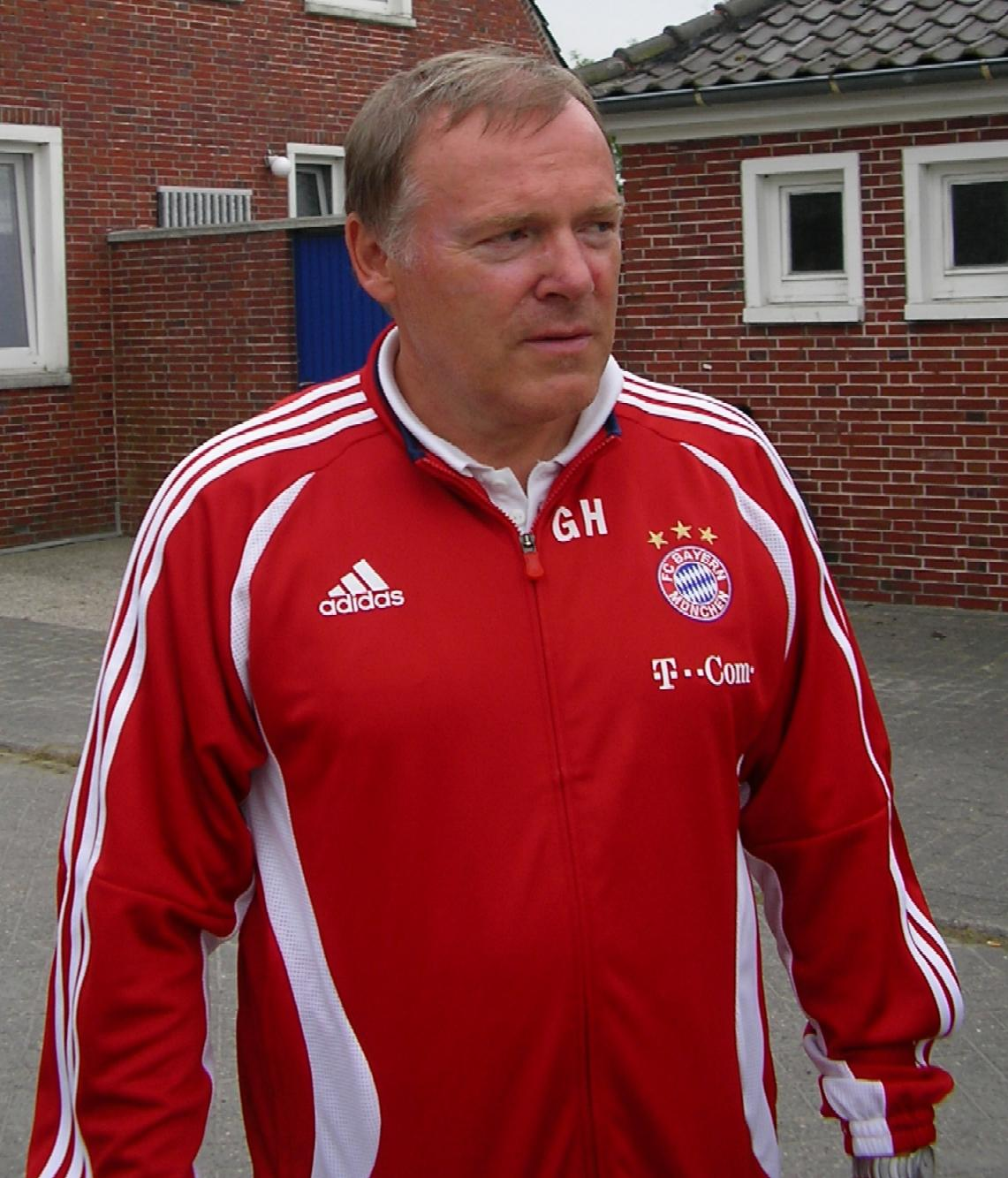
Gerland as Bayern Munich II head coach in 2006

Gerland took over as reserve team manager in 2001. During his time as reserve team manager, he would go on to manage players like Bastian Schweinsteiger, Philipp Lahm, Thomas Müller, Holger Badstuber, and David Alaba. His first training session was on 25 June 2001. His first match was a 3–0 loss to Eintracht Trier. They would go on to defeat the reserve team of 1. FC Kaiserslautern and SV Darmstadt 98 in the following two weeks. The reserve team kept eight clean sheets during the season including a 9–0 win against Borussia Fulda on 7 April 2002. They finished the 2001–02 season in 10th place.

During the 2002–03 season, the reserve team participated in both the Regionalliga Süd and the German Cup. For the second consecutive season, the reserve team lost the opening fixture of the season. During the 2001–02 season, they had lost to Eintracht Trier. For the 2002–03 season, they lost to Darmstadt 1–0 on 31 July 2002. In fact, they failed to win any of their first six fixtures. This included getting knocked out in the first round of the German Cup. They had lost 2–1 to FC Schalke 04 in the first round of the German Cup. The first win of the season came against Jahn Regensburg. Results includes a 4–2 loss to Stuttgarter Kickers, a 3–2 win against Borussia Neunkirchen, a 4–0 win against Eintracht Frankfurt II, a 5–0 win against Stuttgarter kickers, and a 5–1 loss to Unterhaching. The reserve team finished in fourth place.

The reserve team opened up the 2003–04 season with a 2–0 win against Rot-Weiß Erfurt on 2 August 2003. The reserve team opened the season with an 18–match undefeated streak that spanned from 2 August 2003 to 22 November 2003. The streak included a 6–1 win against VfR Aalen on 22 August 2003, a 4–1 win against Sportfreunde Siegen on 7 September 2003, a 4–0 win against Kickers Offenbach on 26 September 2003, and a 5–1 win against SC Pfullendorf on 2 November 2003. The first loss of the 2003–04 season was a 1–0 loss to 1. FC Schweinfurt 05. The reserve team would go on to lose on three more fixtures. They finished the season as Regionalliga Süd champions.

The reserve team started the 2004–05 season with a 3–0 win against Pfullendorf on 8 August 2004. During the 2004–05 season, the reserve team faced reserve teams from other clubs. The reserve team for Bayern defeated 1860 Munich II 4–2 and drew 1–1, drew 1. FSV Mainz 05 0–0 and 1–1, and defeated VfB Stuttgart II 2–1 and lost 2–1. During the 2004–05 season, the reserve team defeated Borussia Mönchengladbach in a shootout and Alemannia Aachen and Eintracht Braunschweig in regular time to get to the quarter–final of the German Cup where they lost to Werder Bremen 3–0. The reserve team finished the 2004–05 season in sixth place.

==== 2005–2009 ====
The reserve team started the 2005–06 season with a 1–0 win against Jahn Regensburg on 6 August 2005. The extended it to a four–match undefeated streak. Matchdays nine to 11 ended up being the roughest patch of the season. The reserve team lost 4–0 to TuS Koblenz, 3–0 to FC Augsburg, and 4–0 to SpVgg Bayreuth. on 28 March 2006, the reserve team and Wehen Wiesbaden finished in a 4–4 draw. The reserve team finished the 2005–06 season in 12th place.

The reserve team started the 2006–07 season with a 2–0 loss to Hessen Kassel on 5 August 2006. On 27 August 2006, the reserve team and SV Elversberg finished in a 4–4 draw. On 29 October 2006, the reserve team won 4–1 against Stuttgart II. On 24 March 2007, the reserve team defeated SSV Reutlingen 05 3–0. On 6 May 2007, the reserve team list to Stuttgart II 4–0. The reserve team finished the 2006–07 season in eighth place.

The reserve team started the 2007–08 season with a 0–0 draw with Reutlingen on 27 July 2007. The reserve team defeated FSV Oggersheim 7–0 on 18 May 2008. The reserve team finished the season in eighth place.

The reserve team started the 2008–09 season with a 2–1 win against Union Berlin on 27 July 2008. On 27 April 2009, Bayern sacked Jürgen Klinsmann, along with assistants Martin Vasquez and Nick Theslof. Jupp Heynckes took over as manager for the remainder of the season and Gerland became the assistant. Mehmet Scholl took over the reserve team. Gerland's final match was a 3–2 loss to Erzgebirge Aue on 26 April 2009. The reserve team were in sixth place when Gerland left the team.

==== 2009–2021 ====
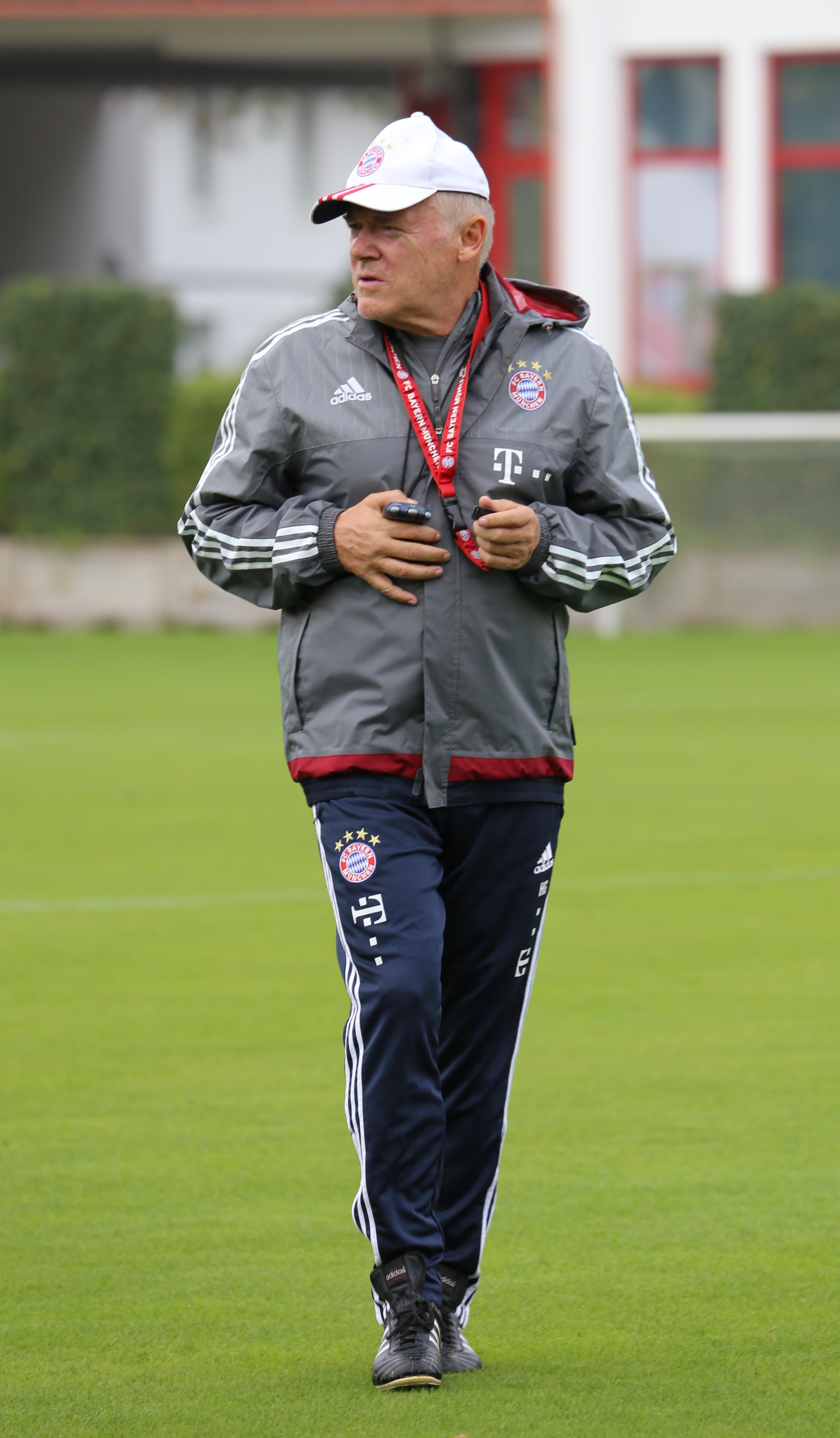
Gerland in 2015

Gerland became an assistant under Jupp Heynckes and continued to be an assistant when Louis van Gaal became manager. Andries Jonker also became an assistant under van Gaal.

Gerland replaced Mehmet Scholl as reserve team manager at the beginning of the 2010–11 season. Louis van Gaal was sacked on 10 April 2011. Andries Jonker became the interim manager and Gerland and Marcel Bout became assistants. Gerland continued to be an assistant under Jupp Heynckes, Pep Guardiola, and Carlo Ancelotti.

On 22 February 2017, Gerland was appointed the athletic director for Bayern's new youth training center, FC Bayern Campus. Gerland continued to be Ancelotti's assistant. Gerland became the number one assistant to Ancelotti after Paul Clement was hired by Swansea City. After Ancelotti was sacked in late September 2017, Gerland retained his role as assistant manager under new manager Jupp Heynckes.

On 1 July 2018, Gerland returned to his role as the sporting director for Bayern's youth teams at the FC Bayern Campus. In November 2019, Gerland became the assistant coach of Hansi Flick who took over the position of head coach at Bayern Munich, until May 2021.

=== 2021–2025: Germany U21 ===
In September 2021, Gerland was presented as assistant coach of the U21 team of Germany. After the team placed 2nd in the 2025 UEFA European Under-21 Championship, Gerland announced the end of his coaching career.

=== Overview ===
| Club | Season | League | | | | | | | | Cup | Europe | Ref. |
| Club | Season | M | W | D | L | GF | GA | Win % | Pos. | Pos. | Pos. | Ref. |
|---|---|---|---|---|---|---|---|---|---|---|---|---|
| Bochum | 1986–87 | 34 | 9 | 14 | 11 | 52 | 44 | 26.47 | 11th | FR | — | |
| Bochum | 1987–88 | 34 | 10 | 10 | 14 | 47 | 51 | 29.41 | 12th | F | — | |
| Bochum | Totals | 68 | 19 | 24 | 25 | 99 | 95 | 27.94 | — | — | — | — |
| Nürnberg | 1988–89 | 34 | 8 | 10 | 16 | 36 | 54 | 23.53 | 14th | SR | FR | |
| Nürnberg | 1989–90 | 27 | 8 | 10 | 9 | 33 | 32 | 29.63 | 9th | SR | — | |
| Nürnberg | Totals | 61 | 16 | 20 | 25 | 69 | 86 | 26.23 | — | — | — | — |
| Bayern Munich (A) | 1990–91 | 32 | 16 | 7 | 9 | 58 | 39 | 50.00 | 4th | — | — | |
| Bayern Munich (A) | 1991–92 | 32 | 11 | 9 | 12 | 49 | 41 | 34.38 | 6th | — | — | |
| Bayern Munich (A) | 1992–93 | 32 | 16 | 8 | 8 | 58 | 31 | 50.00 | 5th | — | — | |
| Bayern Munich (A) | 1993–94 | 32 | 17 | 6 | 9 | 53 | 32 | 53.13 | 4th | — | — | |
| Bayern Munich (A) | 1994–95 | 34 | 12 | 12 | 10 | 43 | 45 | 35.29 | 7th | QF | — | |
| Bayern Munich (A) | Totals | 162 | 72 | 42 | 48 | 261 | 188 | 44.44 | — | — | — | — |
| Nürnberg | 1995–96 | 27 | 7 | 12 | 8 | 27 | 29 | 25.93 | 12th | QF | — | |
| Tennis Borussia Berlin | 1996–97 | 22 | 11 | 7 | 4 | 39 | 16 | 50.00 | 6th | — | — | |
| Tennis Borussia Berlin | 1997–98 | 34 | 29 | 5 | 0 | 86 | 7 | 85.29 | 1st | — | — | |
| Tennis Borussia Berlin | 1998–99 | 14 | 8 | 2 | 4 | 22 | 17 | 57.14 | 5th | QF | — | |
| Tennis Borussia Berlin | Totals | 70 | 48 | 14 | 8 | 147 | 40 | 68.57 | — | — | — | — |
| Arminia Bielefeld | 1999–2000 | 34 | 7 | 9 | 18 | 40 | 61 | 20.59 | 17th | R16 | — | |
| Arminia Bielefeld | 2000–01 | 8 | 4 | 2 | 2 | 13 | 9 | 50.00 | 4th | SR | — | |
| Arminia Bielefeld | Totals | 42 | 11 | 11 | 20 | 53 | 70 | 26.19 | — | — | — | — |
| Ulm | 2000–01 | 16 | 3 | 5 | 8 | 17 | 23 | 18.75 | 16th | R16 | — | |
| Bayern Munich II | 2001–02 | 34 | 13 | 9 | 12 | 58 | 51 | 38.24 | 10th | — | — | |
| Bayern Munich II | 2002–03 | 36 | 16 | 9 | 11 | 51 | 35 | 44.44 | 4th | FR | — | |
| Bayern Munich II | 2003–04 | 34 | 17 | 13 | 4 | 71 | 33 | 50.00 | 1st | — | — | |
| Bayern Munich II | 2004–05 | 34 | 14 | 10 | 10 | 51 | 38 | 41.18 | 6th | QF | — | |
| Bayern Munich II | 2005–06 | 34 | 11 | 9 | 14 | 34 | 44 | 32.35 | 12th | — | — | |
| Bayern Munich II | 2006–07 | 34 | 11 | 13 | 10 | 41 | 37 | 32.35 | 8th | — | — | |
| Bayern Munich II | 2007–08 | 34 | 12 | 11 | 11 | 53 | 42 | 35.29 | 8th | — | — | |
| Bayern Munich II | 2008–09 | 33 | 12 | 14 | 7 | 43 | 33 | 36.36 | 6th | — | — | |
| Bayern Munich II | Totals | 283 | 106 | 88 | 89 | 402 | 313 | 37.46 | — | — | — | — |
| Bayern Munich II | 2010–11 | 32 | 5 | 8 | 19 | 23 | 49 | 15.63 | 19th | — | — | |

== Career statistics ==
=== Club career statistics ===
| Club performance | | | League | | Cup | | Total | |
| Season | Club | League | Apps | Goals | Apps | Goals | Apps | Goals |
| West Germany | | | League | | DFB-Pokal | | Total | |
|---|---|---|---|---|---|---|---|---|
| 1972–73 | VfL Bochum | Bundesliga | 20 | 1 | 2 | 0 | 22 | 1 |
| 1973–74 | VfL Bochum | Bundesliga | 13 | 0 | 0 | 0 | 13 | 0 |
| 1974–75 | VfL Bochum | Bundesliga | 9 | 0 | 1 | 0 | 10 | 0 |
| 1975–76 | VfL Bochum | Bundesliga | 25 | 1 | 4 | 1 | 29 | 2 |
| 1976–77 | VfL Bochum | Bundesliga | 32 | 0 | 3 | 1 | 35 | 1 |
| 1977–78 | VfL Bochum | Bundesliga | 30 | 1 | 2 | 0 | 32 | 1 |
| 1978–79 | VfL Bochum | Bundesliga | 22 | 0 | 4 | 0 | 26 | 0 |
| 1979–80 | VfL Bochum | Bundesliga | 19 | 1 | 4 | 0 | 23 | 1 |
| 1980–81 | VfL Bochum | Bundesliga | 17 | 0 | 2 | 0 | 19 | 0 |
| 1981–82 | VfL Bochum | Bundesliga | 7 | 0 | 1 | 0 | 8 | 0 |
| 1982–83 | VfL Bochum | Bundesliga | 3 | 0 | 1 | 0 | 4 | 0 |
| 1983–84 | VfL Bochum | Bundesliga | 7 | 0 | 1 | 0 | 8 | 0 |
| 1984–85 | VfL Bochum II | Oberliga Westfalen | | | 2 | 0 | | |
| Total | West Germany | | | | 27 | 2 | | |
| Career total | | | | | 27 | 2 | | |

== Managerial statistics ==
As of 20 July 2016.

| Team | From | To | Record | | | | | | | | |
| Team | From | To | M | W | D | L | GF | GA | GD | Win % | Ref. |
|---|---|---|---|---|---|---|---|---|---|---|---|
| Bochum | 1 July 1986 | 30 June 1988 | 76 | 24 | 25 | 27 | 111 | 100 | +11 | 31.58 | |
| Nürnberg | 1 July 1988 | 9 April 1990 | 68 | 19 | 21 | 28 | 82 | 97 | −15 | 27.94 | |
| Bayern Munich (A) | 1 July 1990 | 30 June 1995 | 166 | 73 | 44 | 49 | 268 | 195 | +73 | 43.98 | |
| Nürnberg | 1 July 1995 | 30 April 1996 | 30 | 9 | 12 | 9 | 34 | 34 | +0 | 30.00 | |
| Tennis Borussia Berlin | 21 October 1996 | 18 November 1998 | 73 | 51 | 14 | 8 | 156 | 44 | +112 | 69.86 | |
| Arminia Bielefeld | 1 July 1999 | 16 October 2000 | 46 | 14 | 11 | 21 | 62 | 75 | −13 | 30.43 | |
| Ulm | 31 October 2000 | 21 March 2001 | 17 | 3 | 5 | 9 | 19 | 27 | −8 | 17.65 | |
| Bayern Munich II | 25 June 2001 | 26 April 2009 | 288 | 108 | 89 | 91 | 409 | 322 | +87 | 37.50 | |
| Bayern Munich II | 1 July 2010 | 10 April 2011 | 32 | 5 | 8 | 19 | 23 | 49 | −26 | 15.63 | |
| Total | | | 796 | 306 | 229 | 261 | 1,164 | 943 | +221 | 38.44 | — |

== Honours ==
=== Club ===
VfL Bochum

- DFB-Pokal runner-up: 1987–88

=== Manager ===
Bayern Munich II

- Regionalliga Süd: 2003–04
