= 1998–99 Regionalliga =

5th season of the Regionalliga as a third-level league

Regionalliga
- Season: 1998–99
- Promoted: Chemnitzer FC (NO); Alemannia Aachen (SW); Waldhof Mannheim (S); Kickers Offenbach (S)
- Relegated: Kickers Emden; VfL Herzlake; Sportfreunde Ricklingen; Spandauer SV; SD Croatia Berlin; Wuppertaler SV; FC Homburg; SpVgg Erkenschwick; FC Remscheid; SC Weismain; SC Neukirchen
- Top goalscorer: Daniel Bärwolf, Daniel Thioune (26 goals)

The 1998–99 Regionalliga was the fifth season played in the Regionalliga as the third tier of German football.

As in the previous season, the competition was organized in four divisions: Nord, Nordost, West/Südwest and Süd. Each division had 18 teams with the exception of the West/Südwest division with only 17.

== Nord ==
VfL Osnabrück remained in the Regionalliga, because they lost in the play-offs against Chemnitzer FC. As the loser of the North-Northeast play-offs, Osnabrück competed in another play-off against Eintracht Trier and Kickers Offenbach, but could not qualify for promotion to the 2. Bundesliga.

Kickers Emden, VfL Hasetal Herzlake and Sportfreunde Ricklingen were relegated to the Oberliga.

=== Final table ===
Pos	Team	Pld	W	D	L	GF	GA	GD	Pts	Promotion or relegation
1	VfL Osnabrück (C)	34	23	6	5	67	26	+41	75	Qualification to promotion play-offs
2	VfB Lübeck	34	23	4	7	73	33	+40	73	
3	Eintracht Braunschweig	34	18	10	6	71	42	+29	64	
4	SV Werder Bremen Amateure	34	17	5	12	81	54	+27	56	
5	Eintracht Nordhorn	34	15	7	12	55	54	+1	52	
6	TuS Celle FC	34	14	9	11	59	54	+5	51	
7	SV Wilhelmshaven	34	13	10	11	53	50	+3	49	
8	Lüneburger SK	34	12	10	12	51	49	+2	46	
9	VfB Oldenburg	34	12	10	12	59	58	+1	46	
10	BV Cloppenburg	34	14	3	17	53	53	0	45	
11	SV Meppen	34	13	6	15	42	46	−4	45	
12	1. SC Norderstedt	34	12	9	13	41	51	−10	45	
13	Arminia Hannover	34	12	7	15	37	42	−5	43	
14	Holstein Kiel	34	11	8	15	44	60	−16	41	
15	Hamburger SV Amateure	34	11	5	18	38	60	−22	38	
16	Kickers Emden (R)	34	7	13	14	49	65	−16	34	Relegation to Oberliga
17	VfL Herzlake (R)	34	6	7	21	44	83	−39	25	Relegation to Oberliga
18	Sportfreunde Ricklingen (R)	34	7	3	24	33	70	−37	24	Relegation to Oberliga

(C) Champions; (R) Relegated

=== Top scorers ===
#	Player	Club	Goals
1.	(Germany) Daniel Bärwolf	VfB Lübeck	26
2.	(Germany) Daniel Thioune	VfL Osnabrück	26
3.	(Germany) Marinus Bester	Lüneburger SK	17
4.	(Germany) Christian Claaßen	VfL Osnabrück	16
4.	(Germany) Carsten Minich	Eintracht Nordhorn	16
4.	(Turkey) Garip Capin	TuS Celle	15
4.	(Germany) Markus Erdmann	Arminia Hannover	15
6.	(Nigeria) Collins Etebu	VfB Oldenburg	14
6.	(Netherlands) Dennis van Dijk	Werder Bremen (A)	14
10.	(Turkey) Hakan Cengiz	Kickers Emden	12
10.	(Germany) Mike Göbel	Holstein Kiel	12
10.	(Netherlands) Geert Goolkate	Eintracht Nordhorn	12
10.	(Germany) Klaus Osterkamp	BV Cloppenburg	12

== Nordost ==
Chemnitzer FC won promotion to the 2. Bundesliga by defeating VfL Osnabrück in the play-offs, Spandauer SV and SD Croatia Berlin are relegated to the Oberliga. Eisenhüttenstädter FC Stahl remains in the league due to the forcible relegation of Spandauer SV.

=== Final table ===
Pos	Team	Pld	W	D	L	GF	GA	GD	Pts	Promotion or relegation
1	Chemnitzer FC (C, P)	34	23	8	3	59	12	+47	77	Qualification to promotion play-offs
2	VfB Leipzig	34	21	7	6	59	28	+31	70	
3	1. FC Magdeburg	34	18	10	6	55	35	+20	64	
4	FSV Zwickau	34	19	7	8	54	35	+19	64	
5	VFC Plauen	34	16	11	7	56	42	+14	59	
6	1. FC Union Berlin	34	17	6	11	57	27	+30	57	
7	FC Erzgebirge Aue	34	15	8	11	49	39	+10	53	
8	FC Berlin	34	15	8	11	48	38	+10	53	
9	FC Carl Zeiss Jena	34	13	9	12	36	38	−2	48	
10	Rot-Weiß Erfurt	34	12	9	13	41	46	−5	45	
11	Dynamo Dresden	34	10	8	16	43	44	−1	38	
12	FSV Lok Altmark Stendal	34	11	5	18	35	58	−23	38	
13	Dresdner SC	34	9	9	16	31	51	−20	36	
14	FC Sachsen Leipzig	34	8	11	15	41	62	−21	35	
15	SV Babelsberg 03	34	7	13	14	36	50	−14	34	
16	Spandauer SV (R)	34	6	9	19	31	54	−23	27	Relegation to Oberliga
17	Eisenhüttenstädter FC Stahl	34	4	11	19	31	62	−31	23	
18	SD Croatia Berlin (R)	34	6	3	25	20	61	−41	21	Relegation to Oberliga

(C) Champions; (P) Promoted; (R) Relegated

=== Top scorers ===
#	Player	Club	Goals
1.	(Germany) Rainer Wiedemann	FSV Lok Altmark Stendal	19
2.	(Federal Republic of Yugoslavia) Veselin Popović	FSV Zwickau	16
3.	(Germany) Steffen Menze	1. FC Union Berlin	14
4.	(Bosnia and Herzegovina) Almir Filipović	FC Sachsen Leipzig	13
5.	(Germany) Marco Dittgen	VfB Leipzig	12
5.	(Germany) Nico Patschinski	Dynamo Dresden	12
7.	(Germany) Heiko Brestrich	FC Berlin	11
7.	(Germany) Hendryk Lau	SV Babelsberg 03	11
7.	(Germany) Rocco Milde	FSV Zwickau	11
7.	(Germany) Arnd Spranger	VFC Plauen	11
7.	(Germany) Mirko Ullmann	Chemnitzer FC	11

== West/Südwest ==
Alemannia Aachen was promoted to the 2. Bundesliga while Eintracht Trier took part in the play-offs against VfL Osnabrück and Kickers Offenbach, but was not promoted. FSV Salmrohr, SpVgg Erkenschwick and FC Remscheid were relegated to the Oberliga while Wuppertaler SV and FC 08 Homburg were forcibly relegated.

=== Final table ===
Pos	Team	Pld	W	D	L	GF	GA	GD	Pts	Promotion or relegation
1	Alemannia Aachen (C, P)	32	20	4	8	56	38	+18	64	Promotion to 2. Bundesliga
2	Eintracht Trier	32	18	6	8	62	37	+25	60	Qualification to promotion play-offs
3	Sportfreunde Siegen	32	15	9	8	48	24	+24	54	
4	Preußen Münster	32	14	11	7	60	36	+24	53	
5	1. FC Saarbrücken	32	15	8	9	53	38	+15	53	
6	LR Ahlen	32	15	8	9	55	41	+14	53	
7	SC Paderborn 07	32	15	8	9	51	39	+12	53	
8	Wuppertaler SV (R)	32	16	5	11	62	54	+8	53	Relegation to Oberliga
9	Bayer 04 Leverkusen Amateure	32	13	10	9	58	47	+11	49	
10	SC Verl	32	13	8	11	55	56	−1	47	
11	1. FC Kaiserslautern Amateure	32	11	12	9	62	48	+14	45	
12	SV Elversberg	32	9	12	11	35	40	−5	39	
13	FC 08 Homburg (R)	32	8	12	12	29	49	−20	36	Relegation to Oberliga
14	Borussia Dortmund Amateure	32	8	9	15	46	57	−11	33	
15	FSV Salmrohr	32	8	5	19	38	59	−21	29	
16	SpVgg Erkenschwick (R)	32	2	9	21	30	77	−47	15	Relegation to Oberliga
17	FC Remscheid (R)	32	2	4	26	23	83	−60	10	Relegation to Oberliga

(C) Champions; (P) Promoted; (R) Relegated

=== Top scorers ===
#	Player	Club	Goals
1.	(Germany) Daniel Graf	1. FC Kaiserslautern (A)	19
2.	(Croatia) Vlado Papić	Eintracht Trier	17
2.	(Germany) Christian Timm	Borussia Dortmund (A)	17
4.	(Bosnia and Herzegovina) Zorislav Jonjić	Sportfreunde Siegen	16
4.	(Germany) Gerrit Meinke	Wuppertaler SV	16
6.	(Turkey) Ersin Demir	Bayer Leverkusen (A)	15
7.	(Germany) Holger Karp	LR Ahlen	14
8.	(Germany) Carsten Gockel	Preußen Münster	13
8.	(Germany) Frank Wagner	FSV Salmrohr	13
10.	(Italy) Antonio Di Salvo	SC Paderborn 07	12

== Süd ==
SV Waldhof Mannheim was promoted to the 2. Bundesliga while Kickers Offenbach took part in the play-offs against VfL Osnabrück and Eintracht Trier and was promoted to the 2. Bundesliga. SC Weismain and SC Neukirchen 1899 were relegated to the Oberliga.

=== Final table ===
Pos	Team	Pld	W	D	L	GF	GA	GD	Pts	Promotion or relegation
1	SV Waldhof Mannheim (C, P)	34	21	8	5	57	25	+32	71	Promotion to 2. Bundesliga
2	Kickers Offenbach (P)	34	19	11	4	71	38	+33	68	Qualification to promotion play-offs
3	SSV Reutlingen 05	34	14	14	6	54	30	+24	56	
4	VfB Stuttgart Amateure	34	15	8	11	54	48	+6	53	
5	1. FC Schweinfurt 05	34	13	12	9	52	44	+8	51	
6	SV Wehen	34	15	6	13	48	57	−9	51	
7	Wacker Burghausen	34	13	11	10	50	42	+8	50	
8	FC Bayern Munich Amateure	34	13	10	11	53	41	+12	49	
9	TSV 1860 München Amateure	34	12	9	13	49	51	−2	45	
10	VfR Mannheim	34	9	13	12	33	45	−12	40	
11	Karlsruher SC Amateure	34	10	9	15	51	52	−1	39	
12	TSF Ditzingen	34	10	9	15	43	57	−14	39	
13	Borussia Fulda	34	11	6	17	45	69	−24	39	
14	FC Augsburg	34	10	8	16	42	57	−15	38	
15	FSV Frankfurt	34	11	5	18	45	62	−17	38	
16	SC Pfullendorf	34	10	7	17	38	37	+1	37	
17	SC Weismain (R)	34	8	12	14	42	53	−11	36	Relegation to Oberliga
18	SC Neukirchen (R)	34	9	8	17	43	62	−19	35	Relegation to Oberliga

(C) Champions; (P) Promoted; (R) Relegated

=== Top scorers ===
#	Player	Club	Goals
1.	(Croatia) Marijo Marić	SSV Reutlingen	23
2.	(Germany) Oliver Roth	Kickers Offenbach	16
2.	(Germany) Thorsten Seufert	1. FC Schweinfurt 05	16
4.	(Germany) Marco Fladung	Borussia Fulda	13
4.	(Germany) Fred Klaus	SC Weismain	13
4.	(Germany) Heiko Liebers	SC Neukirchen	13
7.	(Croatia) Marko Barlecaj	1860 Munich (A) / SC Pfullendorf	12
7.	(Germany) Jörg Kirsten	SV Waldhof Mannheim	12
7.	(Germany) Sascha Maier	VfR Mannheim	12
7.	(Germany) Andreas Rüppel	FSV Frankfurt	12
7.	(Germany) Richard Walz	SV Wehen	12

== Promotion playoffs ==
A preliminary decider was contested between the champions of the North and North-East regions. Chemnitzer FC won on aggregate and so were promoted to the 2. Bundesliga.

Team 1	Agg.	Team 2	1st leg	2nd leg
Chemnitzer FC (NE)	3–0	VfL Osnabrück (N)	2–0	1–0

The loser of the above tie faced the second placed teams from the South and West/South-West regions for a final promotion place. Kickers Offenbach earned promotion to the 2. Bundesliga.

Team 1	Score	Team 2
Kickers Offenbach (S)	2–0	Eintracht Trier (SW)

Team 1	Score	Team 2
Eintracht Trier (SW)	2–3	VfL Osnabrück (NE)

Team 1	Score	Team 2
VfL Osnabrück (NE)	1–2	Kickers Offenbach (S)
