= Miloš Kolaković =

Serbian footballer

Personal information
- Full name: Miloš Kolaković
- Date of birth: 25 June 1974 (age 52)
- Place of birth: Belgrade, SFR Yugoslavia
- Height: 1.78 m (5 ft 10 in)
- Position: Striker

Senior career*
Years	Team	Apps	(Gls)
1993–1995	Voždovac	56	(4)
1996–1998	Eintracht Braunschweig	80	(40)
1998	Arminia Bielefeld	8	(0)
1999–2001	Eintracht Braunschweig	56	(10)
2001–2004	OFK Beograd	85	(21)
2005	Debrecen	6	(0)
2006	Radnički Niš	0	(0)
2006–2007	Voždovac	23	(7)
2007	Nea Salamis	6	(0)
2008	Bežanija	12	(2)
2008	Grafičar	2	(0)
Total		334	(84)

International career
2004	Serbia and Montenegro	3	(0)
- * Club domestic league appearances and goals

Miloš Kolaković (Serbian Cyrillic: Милош Колаковић; born 25 June 1974) is a Serbian former professional footballer who played as a striker.

== Club career ==
After playing for Voždovac in the Serbian League Belgrade, Kolaković moved abroad to Germany and joined Regionalliga club Eintracht Braunschweig in the 1996 winter transfer window. He played 80 league games and scored 40 goals over the next two and a half seasons, securing him a transfer to Zweite Bundesliga side Arminia Bielefeld in the summer of 1998. Half a year later, Kolaković returned to Eintracht Braunschweig, spending another two and a half seasons with the club.

In the summer of 2001, Kolaković returned to his homeland and signed with OFK Beograd. He made 85 appearances and scored 21 goals in the First League of Serbia and Montenegro, before moving abroad for the second time and joining Hungarian side Debrecen in the 2005 winter transfer window, helping them win the title. During the 2006 winter transfer window, Kolaković returned to his homeland and joined Radnički Niš.

== International career ==
Kolaković was capped three times for Serbia and Montenegro, making his international debut in a 1–1 friendly draw against Northern Ireland at Windsor Park in April 2004, less than two months shy of his 30th birthday. He also represented the country at the Kirin Cup in July 2004.

== Career statistics ==
Club	Season	League	
Club	Season	Apps	Goals
Voždovac	1993–94		
Voždovac	1994–95		
Voždovac	1995–96		
Eintracht Braunschweig	1995–96	16	3
Eintracht Braunschweig	1996–97	31	19
Eintracht Braunschweig	1997–98	33	18
Arminia Bielefeld	1998–99	8	0
Eintracht Braunschweig	1998–99	7	3
Eintracht Braunschweig	1999–2000	28	6
Eintracht Braunschweig	2000–01	21	1
OFK Beograd	2001–02	23	8
OFK Beograd	2002–03	25	7
OFK Beograd	2003–04	26	6
OFK Beograd	2004–05	11	0
Debrecen	2004–05	6	0
Radnički Niš	2005–06		
Voždovac	2006–07	23	7
Nea Salamis	2007–08	6	0
Bežanija	2007–08	13	2
Career total		277	80

== Honours ==
Debrecen

- Nemzeti Bajnokság I: 2004–05
