= Goran Ćurko =

Serbian footballer (born 1968)

Personal information
- Date of birth: 21 August 1968 (age 58)
- Place of birth: Novi Sad, SR Serbia, SFR Yugoslavia (modern Serbia)
- Height: 1.91 m (6 ft 3 in)
- Position: Goalkeeper

Youth career
- Novi Sad

Senior career*
Years	Team	Apps	(Gls)
1989–1990	Vojvodina	14	(0)
1991	Mogren	36	(0)
1992–1993	Bečej	35	(0)
1993–1995	VfL Herzlake	65	(0)
1995–1997	1. FC Nürnberg	60	(0)
1997–1999	Tennis Borussia Berlin	67	(0)
1999	VfB Leipzig	5	(0)
1999–2000	Kickers Offenbach	27	(0)
2000	Arminia Bielefeld	9	(0)
2001–2003	SSV Reutlingen	80	(0)
2005–2007	ČSK Čelarevo	65	(1)
2010	Proleter Novi Sad	0	(0)
Total		463	(1)
- * Club domestic league appearances and goals

Goran Ćurko (Serbian Cyrillic: Горан Ћурко; born 21 August 1968) is a Serbian former footballer who played as a goalkeeper.

After starting out in Yugoslavia, Ćurko spent the vast majority of his career in Germany. He played for seven German clubs for over a decade (1993–2003), collecting 183 appearances in the 2. Bundesliga.

== Career ==
Born in Novi Sad, Ćurko made his Yugoslav First League debut with Vojvodina in the 1989–90 season. He also played for Mogren and Bečej in the Yugoslav Second League, before moving abroad to Germany.

In early 1993, Ćurko joined VfL Herzlake, spending two and a half years at the club. He subsequently played for 1. FC Nürnberg (1995–1997) and Tennis Borussia Berlin (1997–1999). After a brief spell at VfB Leipzig, Ćurko signed for Kickers Offenbach. He also spent half a season with Arminia Bielefeld. While playing for the club, in October 2000, Ćurko demonstratively left the pitch after conflicting with his own supporters during a home league game versus Waldhof Mannheim. He eventually switched to fellow Zweite Bundesliga's SSV Reutlingen in the 2001 winter transfer window.

After returning to his homeland, Ćurko played for ČSK Čelarevo in the Serbian First League. He was also a member of Proleter Novi Sad in 2010, aged 42, but failed to make any appearances.

== Personal life ==
Ćurko also holds German citizenship. His son, Saša Ćurko, started out his footballing career playing as a forward for Vojvodina.

== Career statistics ==
Club	Season	League	
Club	Season	Apps	Goals
Vojvodina	1989–90	3	0
Vojvodina	1990–91	11	0
Vojvodina	Total	14	0
Mogren	1990–91	17	0
Mogren	1991–92	19	0
Mogren	Total	36	0
Bečej	1991–92	16	0
Bečej	1992–93	19	0
Bečej	Total	35	0
VfL Herzlake	1992–93	2	0
VfL Herzlake	1993–94	29	0
VfL Herzlake	1994–95	34	0
VfL Herzlake	Total	65	0
1. FC Nürnberg	1995–96	34	0
1. FC Nürnberg	1996–97	26	0
1. FC Nürnberg	Total	60	0
Tennis Borussia Berlin	1997–98	34	0
Tennis Borussia Berlin	1998–99	33	0
Tennis Borussia Berlin	Total	67	0
VfB Leipzig	1999–2000	5	0
Kickers Offenbach	1999–2000	27	0
Arminia Bielefeld	2000–01	9	0
SSV Reutlingen	2000–01	16	0
SSV Reutlingen	2001–02	34	0
SSV Reutlingen	2002–03	30	0
SSV Reutlingen	Total	80	0
ČSK Čelarevo	2005–06	37	0
ČSK Čelarevo	2006–07	27	1
ČSK Čelarevo	2007–08	1	0
ČSK Čelarevo	Total	65	1
Proleter Novi Sad	2010–11	0	0
Career total		463	1
