= Ramovš =

Ramovš is a Slovenian surname that may refer to

- Anton Ramovš (1924–2011), Slovenian geologist and paleontologist.
- Darko Ramovš (born 1973), Serbian football player
- Fran Ramovš (1890–1952), Slovenian linguist
- Primož Ramovš (1921–1999), Slovenian composer and librarian
