= 1997–98 Belgian Cup =

Tournament details
- Country: Belgium

Final positions
- Champions: Genk
- Runners-up: Club Brugge

Tournament statistics
- Matches played: 33
- Goals scored: 124 (3.76 per match)
- Top goal scorer(s): Khalilou Fadiga; Gert Verheyen; Gert Claessens; Branko Strupar; Souleymane Oulare; Darko Pivaljević; Edwin van Ankeren; Ralph Hasenhüttl (3 goals)

The 1997–98 Belgian Cup was the 43rd season of the main knockout competition in Belgian association football, the Belgian Cup.

== Final rounds ==
The final phase started in the round of 32 when all clubs from the first division entered the competition (18 clubs plus 14 clubs from the qualifications). All rounds were played in one leg except for the semifinals. The final game was played at the Heysel Stadium in Brussels and won by Genk against Club Brugge.

=== Bracket ===
Round of 32
Diest	1
Germinal Ekeren	5
Neeroeteren	1
Merchtem-Brussegem	0
KV Mechelen	2
Lommelse	0
Gent	4*
Aalst	3
Genk	2
Lebbeke	1
Lierse	5
Strombeek	1
Sint-Truidense	4
Kortrijk	0
Anderlecht	2
Westerlo	1
Club Brugge	4
Oostende	1
Patro Eisden	3
Molenbeek	1
Standard Liège	2
Visétois	1
Sint-Niklase	2
Beveren	5
Harelbeke	4
Lokeren	1
Cercle Brugge	1
Mouscron	2*
Antwerp	4
OC Charleroi	2
Tielen	1
Denderleeuw	2

Round of 16
Germinal Ekeren	2
Neeroeteren	0
KV Mechelen	1
Gent	2
Genk	3
Lierse	1
Sint-Truidense	2
Anderlecht	1
Club Brugge	6
Patro Eisden	0
Standard Liège	2
Beveren	1
Harelbeke	1
Mouscron	2
Antwerp	2
Denderleeuw	0

Quarter-finals
Germinal Ekeren	2
Gent	0
Genk	3
Sint-Truidense	1
Club Brugge	5
Standard Liège	1
Mouscron	5
Antwerp	0

Semifinals
Germinal Ekeren	2	0
Genk	2	0
Club Brugge	1	2
Mouscron	1	1

Final
Genk	4
Club Brugge	0

* after extra time

=== Final ===
16 May 1998
20:00

Genk	4–0	Club Brugge
Oularé 26', 27'; Guðjónsson 39'; Peeters 59'	Report

King Baudouin Stadium, Brussels
Attendance: 35,000
Referee: Armand Ancion
