= Saša Ćurko =

Serbian footballer (born 1996)

Personal information
- Full name: Saša Ćurko
- Date of birth: 12 June 1996 (age 30)
- Place of birth: Reutlingen, Germany
- Height: 1.83 m (6 ft 0 in)
- Position: Forward

Team information
- Current team: Fruskogorac

Youth career
- –2011: Reutlingen 05
- 2011–2012: Novi Sad
- 2012–2014: Vojvodina

Senior career*
Years	Team	Apps	(Gls)
2014–2017	Vojvodina	15	(0)
2016	→ Proleter Novi Sad (loan)	12	(3)
2017	Proleter Novi Sad	9	(0)
2018	Radnički Sremska Mitrovica	12	(2)
2019	Cement Beočin	2	(0)
2019	Dunav Stari Banovci	13	(6)
2020	Mladost Novi Sad		
2021-2023	Tatra Kisac		
2023-	Fruskogorac		

International career
2014–2015	Serbia U19	2	(1)
- * Club domestic league appearances and goals as of 22 April 2019

Saša Ćurko (Serbian Cyrillic: Саша Ћурко; born 12 June 1996) is a Serbian football forward who plays for Fruskogorac Sremska Kamenica.

== Personal life ==
Saša is a son of a former goalkeeper Goran Ćurko.

== Club career ==
=== Vojvodina ===
He made his Jelen SuperLiga debut for Vojvodina on 25 May 2014 in 2:0 away win against Napredak Kruševac.

== Honours ==
Vojvodina

- Serbian Cup: 2013–14

Proleter

- Serbian First League: 2017–18
