= Kreso Kovacec =

German footballer (born 1969)

Personal information
- Date of birth: 20 July 1969 (age 57)
- Place of birth: Krapina, SR Croatia
- Height: 1.77 m (5 ft 10 in)
- Position: Forward

Youth career
- –1987: FC Süderelbe

Senior career*
| Years | Team | Apps | (Gls) |
| 1987–1988 | VfL Bochum II | | |
| 1987–1988 | VfL Bochum | 0 | (0) |
| 1988–1992 | ASV Bergedorf | | |
| 1992–1995 | SC Concordia von 1907 | | |
| 1995–1997 | Hannover 96 | 72 | (40) |
| 1997–1999 | Tennis Borussia Berlin | 37 | (19) |
| 1999–2002 | Hansa Rostock | 28 | (3) |
| 2002–2003 | FC Augsburg | 23 | (7) |
| 2003–2004 | SV Elversberg | 17 | (2) |
| 2005–2007 | DJK Lechhausen | | |
- * Club domestic league appearances and goals

Kreso Kovacec (born 20 July 1969) is a German retired professional footballer who played as a forward. He spent three seasons in the Bundesliga with Hansa Rostock.

== Career statistics ==
Appearances and goals by club, season and competition
| Club | Season | League | | | Cup | | Total | |
| Club | Season | Division | Apps | Goals | Apps | Goals | Apps | Goals |
|---|---|---|---|---|---|---|---|---|
| VfL Bochum II | 1987–88 | Oberliga Westfalen | | | — | | | |
| VfL Bochum | 1987–88 | Bundesliga | 0 | 0 | 0 | 0 | 0 | 0 |
| ASV Bergedorf | 1988–89 | Verbandsliga Hamburg | | | — | | | |
| ASV Bergedorf | 1989–90 | Verbandsliga Hamburg | | | — | | | |
| ASV Bergedorf | 1990–91 | Verbandsliga Hamburg | | | — | | | |
| ASV Bergedorf | 1991–92 | Verbandsliga Hamburg | | | — | | | |
| ASV Bergedorf | Total | | | | 0 | 0 | | |
| SC Concordia von 1907 | 1992–93 | Verbandsliga Hamburg | | | — | | | |
| SC Concordia von 1907 | 1993–94 | Verbandsliga Hamburg | | | — | | | |
| SC Concordia von 1907 | 1994–95 | Regionalliga Nord | 32 | 13 | — | | 32 | 13 |
| SC Concordia von 1907 | Total | | | | 0 | 0 | | |
| Hannover 96 | 1995–96 | 2. Bundesliga | 32 | 6 | 1 | 0 | 33 | 6 |
| Hannover 96 | 1996–97 | Regionalliga Nord | 32 | 25 | 2 | 1 | 34 | 26 |
| Hannover 96 | 1997–98 | Regionalliga Nord | 8 | 9 | 1 | 0 | 9 | 9 |
| Hannover 96 | Total | | 72 | 40 | 4 | 1 | 76 | 41 |
| Tennis Borussia Berlin | 1997–98 | Regionalliga Nordost | 18 | 12 | — | | 18 | 12 |
| Tennis Borussia Berlin | 1998–99 | 2. Bundesliga | 19 | 7 | 4 | 5 | 23 | 12 |
| Tennis Borussia Berlin | Total | | 37 | 19 | 4 | 5 | 41 | 24 |
| Hansa Rostock | 1999–00 | Bundesliga | 17 | 2 | 3 | 0 | 20 | 2 |
| Hansa Rostock | 2000–01 | Bundesliga | 8 | 1 | 1 | 1 | 9 | 2 |
| Hansa Rostock | 2001–02 | Bundesliga | 3 | 0 | 0 | 0 | 3 | 0 |
| Hansa Rostock | Total | | 28 | 3 | 4 | 1 | 32 | 4 |
| FC Augsburg | 2002–03 | Regionalliga Süd | 23 | 7 | — | | 23 | 7 |
| SV Elversberg | 2003–04 | Regionalliga Süd | 17 | 2 | — | | 17 | 2 |
| Career total | | | | | 12 | 7 | | |
