= Hendryk Lau =

German footballer

Personal information
- Date of birth: 5 September 1969 (age 57)
- Place of birth: East Berlin, East Germany
- Height: 1.85 m (6 ft 1 in)
- Position: Striker

Youth career
- Berliner FC Dynamo
- SG Dynamo Lichtenberg
- –1992: BSV Spindlersfeld

Senior career*
Years	Team	Apps	(Gls)
1992–1993	SV Meppen	6	(0)
1993–1997	VfL Herzlake	122	(34)
1997–2000	SV Babelsberg 03	97	(36)
2000–2002	Dresdner SC	55	(16)
2002–2005	SV Babelsberg 03	89	(30)
2005–2006	Berliner FC Dynamo	26	(8)
Total		395	(124)
- * Club domestic league appearances and goals

Hendryk Lau (born 5 September 1969) is a German former professional footballer who played as a striker.
