= Jacky Peeters =

Belgian footballer

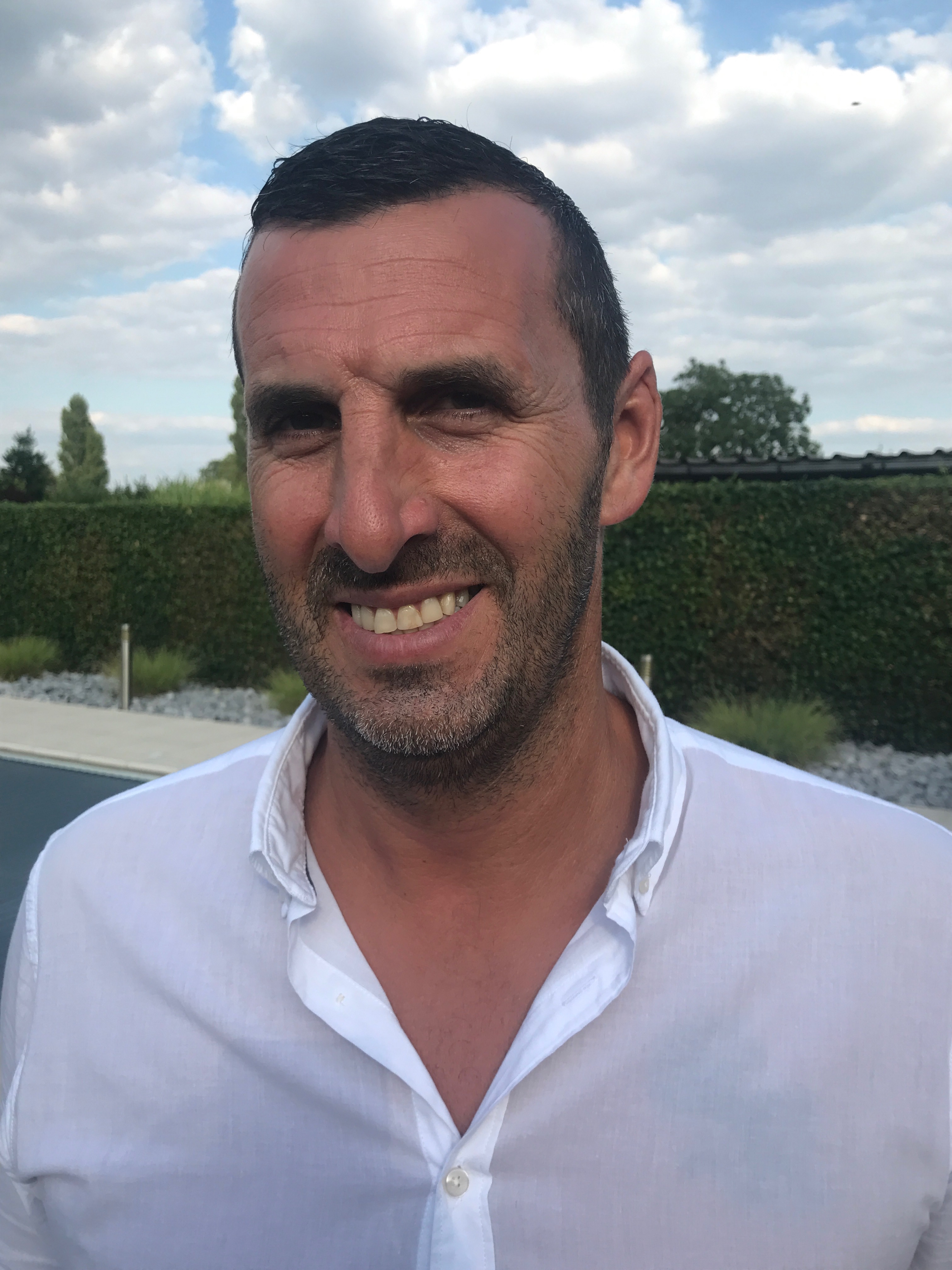

Personal information
- Date of birth: 13 December 1969 (age 56)
- Place of birth: Bree, Belgium
- Height: 1.84 m (6 ft 0 in)
- Position: Defender

Senior career*
Years	Team	Apps	(Gls)
1994–1998	Genk	64	(4)
1998–2000	Arminia Bielefeld	57	(3)
2000–2004	Gent	117	(2)
2004–2006	KVV Heusden-Zolder		
2006–2007	Patro Eisden		

International career
1999–2002	Belgium	17	(0)

Managerial career
- 2009: Patro Eisden
- * Club domestic league appearances and goals

Jacky Peeters (Dutch pronunciation: [ˈdʑɛki ˈpeːtərs]; born 13 December 1969) is a Belgian former professional footballer who played as a defender.

== Club career ==
Peeters joined K.R.C Genk in 1994, where he stayed until 1998. His last game with Genk was a 4–0 win against Brugge to see the team win the Cup Final. He scored the fourth goal. Peeters then joined 2. Bundesliga club Arminia Bielefeld, where he achieved promotion to Bundesliga. He then returned to Belgium to join K.A.A Gent, a first division team in Belgium.

== International career ==
Peeters played for Belgium national team, playing at the Euro 2000 and the 2002 World Cup. His first international game was against the Netherlands on 4 September 1999, a 5–5 draw. One of the highlights of his career was playing for Belgium during the 2002 World Cup in Japan and Korea. Most memorable was the game against Brazil, where he assisted a goal by the captain Marc Willmots, which was not counted at the time, but later considered a legal goal. His last game with the Red Devils was a friendly match against Poland on 21 August 2002. Altogether, he played 17 matches for the Belgium national team.

== Honours ==
=== Player ===
Genk

- Belgian Cup: 1997–98

Arminia Bielefeld

- 2. Bundesliga: 1998–99

Belgium

- FIFA Fair Play Trophy: 2002 World Cup
