= Marko Tredup =

German footballer

Personal information
- Full name: Marko Tredup
- Date of birth: 15 May 1974 (age 52)
- Place of birth: East Berlin, East Germany
- Height: 1.80 m (5 ft 11 in)
- Position: Right-back

Team information
- Current team: VfL Osnabrück II (assistant manager)

Youth career
- 1980–: EAW Treptow
- –1985: ESV Lok Schöneweide
- 1985–1994: Union Berlin
- 1994–1995: SC Union 06 Berlin
- 1995–1996: Hansa Rostock

Senior career*
Years	Team	Apps	(Gls)
1996–2000	Tennis Borussia Berlin	74	(4)
2000–2002	Union Berlin	22	(0)
2002–2004	VfL Osnabrück	62	(0)
2004–2006	LR Ahlen	52	(1)
2006–2008	VfL Osnabrück	29	(0)
2008–2009	SV Bad Rothenfelde	31	(0)
Total		270	(5)

Managerial career
- 2010–: VfL Osnabrück II (assistant manager)
- * Club domestic league appearances and goals

Marko Tredup (born 15 May 1974 in East Berlin) is a German former professional footballer who played as a right-back.

Tredup made 142 appearances in the 2. Bundesliga during his playing career.
