= Faruk Namdar =

Turkish footballer

Personal information
- Full name: Faruk Namdar
- Date of birth: 6 May 1974 (age 52)
- Place of birth: West Berlin, West Germany
- Height: 1.84 m (6 ft 0 in)
- Positions: Midfielder; striker

Youth career
- 1987–1991: BSV Hürriyetspor
- 1991–1997: Reinickendorfer Füchse

Senior career*
Years	Team	Apps	(Gls)
1997–1999	Tennis Borussia Berlin	37	(11)
1999	Hannover 96	0	(0)
1999–2000	Altay S.K.	0	(0)
2000–2006	MKE Ankaragücü	11	(1)
2003–2005	→ Karşıyaka S.K. (loan)	94	(24)
2006–2007	Mardinspor	10	(1)
2007	SV Yeşilyurt	1	(0)
Total		153	(37)
- * Club domestic league appearances and goals

Faruk Namdar (born 6 May 1974 in West Berlin, West Germany) is a former professional Turkish footballer.

Namdar made 104 appearances in the Turkish Süper Lig and 12 appearances in the German 2. Bundesliga during his playing career.
