= Jens Melzig =

German footballer (born 1965)

Personal information
- Full name: Jens Melzig
- Date of birth: 28 September 1965 (age 61)
- Place of birth: Cottbus, East Germany
- Height: 1.85 m (6 ft 1 in)
- Position: Defender

Youth career
- –1980: BSG Aktivist Dissenchen
- 1980–1983: BSG Fortschritt Cottbus
- 1983–1984: Energie Cottbus

Senior career*
Years	Team	Apps	(Gls)
1984–1991	Energie Cottbus	144	(12)
1991–1993	Dynamo Dresden	63	(3)
1993–1995	Bayer Leverkusen	40	(0)
1995–1996	Chemnitzer FC	20	(0)
1996–1997	Energie Cottbus	33	(7)
1997–2000	Tennis Borussia Berlin	68	(7)
Total		368	(29)

International career
	East Germany B	1	(0)
- * Club domestic league appearances and goals

Jens Melzig (born 28 September 1965) is a former professional German footballer who played as a defender.

== Career ==
Born in Cottbus, Melzig began his career with Energie Cottbus, helping the club earn promotion to the DDR-Oberliga in 1986, and again in 1988 after they had bounced straight back down to the DDR-Liga. After German reunification, Cottbus failed to qualify for the professional leagues, so in 1991 Melzig joined Dynamo Dresden, who had entered the Bundesliga. He was a first-team regular in two seasons with Dynamo, before joining Bayer Leverkusen for another two-year spell, in which he was mostly used as a backup. In 1995, Melzig joined 2. Bundesliga side Chemnitzer FC, making twenty appearances as the club were relegated to the third-tier Regionalliga Nordost, where they joined Energie Cottbus, whom Melzig promptly re-signed for.

Melzig's second spell with his hometown club would only last one year, but it would be a hugely successful one. He scored seven goals as Cottbus won the division, and beat Hannover 96 in a playoff to earn promotion to the 2. Bundesliga. They also reached the final of the DFB Pokal, where they were defeated by Bundesliga side VfB Stuttgart. Melzig did not join his teammates in the second division, though, opting to stay in the Regionalliga Nordost and join big-spending Tennis Borussia Berlin. Another promotion followed, and Melzig spent two seasons playing for TeBe in the second tier, retiring in 2000.

== Honours ==
- DFB-Pokal finalist: 1996–97
