= Fahed Dermech =

Tunisian footballer

Personal information
- Full name: Fahed Dermech
- Date of birth: 26 November 1966 (age 59)
- Place of birth: Mahdia, Tunisia
- Height: 1.92 m (6 ft 4 in)
- Position: Utility player

Senior career*
Years	Team	Apps	(Gls)
1982–1992	Étoile Sportive du Sahel		
1992–1993	VfL Wolfsburg	19	(1)
1993–1994	FC Monthey		
1994	Eintracht Braunschweig		
1995–1996	TuS Celle FC		
1996–1997	Hannover 96		
1997–1999	Tennis Borussia Berlin	55	(9)
1999–2000	Eintracht Braunschweig	27	(5)
2000–2001	Hannover 96	30	(0)
2001–2003	Étoile Sportive du Sahel		

International career
	Tunisia	18	(?)
- * Club domestic league appearances and goals

Fahed Dermech (born 26 November 1966 in Mahdia) is a retired Tunisian footballer.

Having spent nearly 10 years playing in Germany, Dermech made a total of 72 appearances in the 2. Bundesliga and has 18 caps for the Tunisia national football team.
