= Zbigniew Szewczyk =

Polish footballer

Personal information
- Full name: Zbigniew Szewczyk
- Date of birth: 29 November 1967 (age 58)
- Place of birth: Bolesławiec, Poland
- Height: 1.68 m (5 ft 6 in)
- Position: Midfielder

Team information
- Current team: GKS Tomaszów Bolesławiecki
- Number: 9

Youth career
- –1985: BKS Bolesławiec

Senior career*
Years	Team	Apps	(Gls)
1986–1993	Zagłębie Lubin	141+	(1+)
1993–1997	SV Meppen	101	(2)
1997–2000	Tennis Borussia Berlin	59	(1)
2000–2002	Zagłębie Lubin	51	(0)
2002–2003	Górnik Polkowice	25	(1)
2006–2008	Chrobry Nowogrodziec		
2009–2011	SpVgg 1920 Edenkoben		
2011–2013	VfL Essingen		
2015–2016	Hutnik Pieńsk		
2016–	GKS Tomaszów Bolesławiecki		
- * Club domestic league appearances and goals as of 13 October 2024

Zbigniew Szewczyk (born 29 November 1967) is a Polish footballer who plays as a midfielder for GKS Tomaszów Bolesławiecki.

Szewczyk made a total of 192 appearances in the Ekstraklasa for Zagłębie Lubin during his playing career.

== Honours ==
Zagłębie Lubin

- Ekstraklasa: 1990–91

Górnik Polkowice

- II liga: 2002–03
