= Celaleddin Koçak =

Turkish footballer (born 1977)

Personal information
- Full name: Celaleddin Koçak
- Date of birth: 24 November 1977 (age 48)
- Place of birth: West Berlin, West Germany
- Height: 1.78 m (5 ft 10 in)
- Position: Defender

Youth career
- 1993–1997: Tennis Borussia Berlin

Senior career*
Years	Team	Apps	(Gls)
1997–1999	Tennis Borussia Berlin	51	(1)
1999–2000	Altay	5	(0)
2000–2001	Ankaragücü	17	(0)
2001–2003	Diyarbakırspor	65	(7)
2003–2004	Malatyaspor	33	(4)
2004–2007	Trabzonspor	81	(1)
2008	Manisaspor	10	(0)
2008–2009	Konyaspor	26	(2)
2009–2010	Diyarbakırspor	25	(1)

International career
1998	Turkey U21	1	(0)
- * Club domestic league appearances and goals

Celaleddin Koçak (born 24 November 1977 in West Berlin, West Germany) is a Turkish footballer.

He began his career at Tennis Borussia Berlin but found little success there. Like many young footballers born to Turkish immigrant parents in Germany, he tried his chances by joining a Turkish team. In December 1999, he decided to join Altay S.K. of İzmir. Six months later he had been impressive enough to earn a place at Süper Lig side MKE Ankaragücü. He stayed there for two years, joining Diyarbakırspor in 2002. Here he helped the newly promoted side to remain in the top division.

In summer 2003, Koçak joined Malatyaspor and it was here that he really made a name for himself. As well as helping Malatyaspor to a mid table place, he was particularly impressive in their performances in the UEFA Cup.

The next year, he joined Ziya Doğan, who had brought him to Malatyaspor a year earlier, at Trabzonspor. Again, he established himself in the team from the beginning and became a regular as Trabzonspor finished as runners up in the league.

Koçak in a left sided player who can alternate between defence and midfield. At Trabzonspor, he was used primarily in defence. His abilities lie in his power and speed which help him to make forward runs as well as defending effectively.
