= Duško Adamović =

Serbian footballer (born 1973)

Personal information
- Date of birth: 27 April 1973 (age 53)
- Place of birth: SFR Yugoslavia
- Height: 1.81 m (5 ft 11 in)
- Position: Midfielder

Youth career
- VfB Neukölln

Senior career*
Years	Team	Apps	(Gls)
1991–1992	Marathon 02	5	(0)
1994–1995	Spandauer SV	15	(3)
1995–2001	TeBe Berlin	22	(0)
1995–2001	TeBe Berlin II	45	(2)
2001–2002	Marathon 02	0	(0)
- * Club domestic league appearances and goals

Duško Adamović (Serbian: Душко Адамовић; born 27 April 1973) is a retired Serbian footballer.

Adamović made his debut in the 2. Bundesliga for Tennis Borussia Berlin against FC St. Pauli on 4 March 1999.
