= Zoran Tomčić =

Croatian footballer

Personal information
- Date of birth: 26 February 1970 (age 56)
- Place of birth: SFR Yugoslavia
- Position: Forward

Senior career*
Years	Team	Apps	(Gls)
1992–1993	Radnik VG	23	(0)
1993–1996	Segesta	85	(0)
1996–1998	VfL Wolfsburg	37	(2)
1998–1999	KFC Uerdingen 05	21	(1)
1999–2000	Stahl Brandenburg	17	(0)
2000–2001	SV Babelsberg 03	15	(0)
2001	TŠK Topolovac	5	(0)
2002	Kamen Ingrad	9	(0)
2002–2004	Hrvatski Dragovoljac		
- * Club domestic league appearances and goals

Zoran Tomčić (born 26 February 1970) is a Croatian retired footballer.
