= Müslüm Can =

Turkish footballer (born 1975)

Personal information
- Full name: Müslüm Can
- Date of birth: 22 June 1975 (age 51)
- Place of birth: West Berlin, West Germany
- Height: 1.74 m (5 ft 9 in)
- Position: Midfielder

Youth career
- BFC Meteor 06
- BSV Hürriyet Burgund

Senior career*
| Years | Team | Apps | (Gls) |
| –1997 | Reinickendorfer Füchse | | |
| 1997–1999 | Tennis Borussia Berlin | 47 | (1) |
| 1999–2000 | Altay S.K. | 19 | (1) |
| 2000–2004 | Samsunspor | 101 | (2) |
| 2004–2006 | Kayserispor | 19 | (0) |
| 2006–2007 | Orduspor | 21 | (0) |
| 2007–2008 | Tennis Borussia Berlin | 18 | (0) |
| Total | | 225 | (4) |
- * Club domestic league appearances and goals

Müslüm Can (born 22 June 1975 in West Berlin) is a retired Turkish footballer.

Can made a total of 29 2. Bundesliga appearances for Tennis Borussia Berlin before moving to Turkey where he played 139 games for various clubs in the Süper Lig.
