= Matthias Hamann =

German footballer (born 1968)

Personal information
- Date of birth: 10 February 1968 (age 58)
- Place of birth: Waldsassen, West Germany
- Height: 1.87 m (6 ft 2 in)
- Position: Defender

Youth career
- 1977–1988: FC Wacker München

Senior career*
| Years | Team | Apps | (Gls) |
| 1988–1989 | Bayern Munich (A) | | |
| 1988–1989 | Bayern Munich | 0 | (0) |
| 1989–1990 | Fortuna Köln | 50 | (6) |
| 1990–1992 | SpVgg Unterhaching | 50 | (21) |
| 1992–1994 | Eintracht Trier | | |
| 1994–1996 | 1. FC Kaiserslautern | 28 | (1) |
| 1996–1998 | 1860 Munich | 31 | (1) |
| 1998 | Neuchâtel Xamax | 6 | (1) |
| 1998–2000 | Tennis Borussia Berlin | 57 | (2) |
| 2000–2002 | LR Ahlen | 49 | (6) |
| 2002–2004 | LASK Linz | 24 | (0) |

Managerial career
- 2004–2005: TuS Hohenecken
- 2005–2008: KSV Hessen Kassel
- 2009–2010: LASK Linz
- * Club domestic league appearances and goals

Matthias Hamann (born 10 February 1968, in Waldsassen) is a German football manager and former player. He is the brother of Dietmar Hamann.

Hamann made 59 appearances in the Bundesliga during his playing career.

Hamann worked as a scout as part of the staff for head coach Jürgen Klinsmann on the United States national team until Klinsmann was fired in November 2016.

He now works as scout for Bundesliga team Eintracht Frankfurt.
