= Peter Assion =

German footballer and manager

Personal information
- Date of birth: 24 August 1959 (age 67)
- Place of birth: Germany
- Height: 1.78 m (5 ft 10 in)
- Position: Defender

Senior career*
| Years | Team | Apps | (Gls) |
- SC Geislingen
- 1. FC Eislingen
- VfB Stuttgart II
- SV Göppingen
| 1983–1988 | SSV Ulm 1846 | 139 | (5) |
| 1988–1991 | 1. FC Pforzheim | | |
| 1991–1992 | FC Memmingen | | |
| 1992–1994 | SC Austria Lustenau | | |

Managerial career
- 1992–1994: SC Austria Lustenau
- 1994–1997: Schwarz-Weiß Bregenz
- 2000–2001: SSV Ulm 1846
- 2003–2005: Wustenrot Salzburg
- 2008: SV Wacker Burghausen
- * Club domestic league appearances and goals

Peter Assion (born 24 August 1959) is a German Association football manager and former footballer.
