= Dirk Rehbein =

German footballer

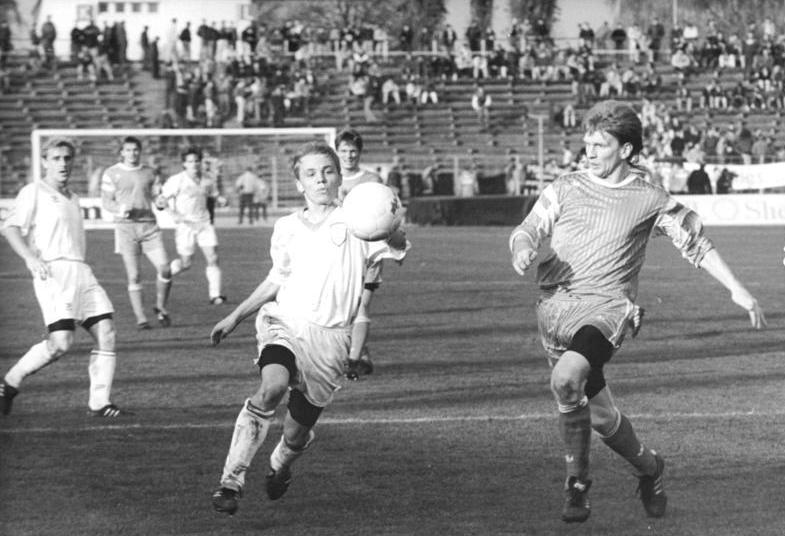
- HFC player Dirk Wüllbier (right) and Berliner Dirk Rehbein (2nd from right) in the fight for the ball (1990).

Personal information
- Full name: Dirk Rehbein
- Date of birth: 14 August 1967 (age 59)
- Place of birth: Langenfeld, West Germany
- Height: 1.74 m (5 ft 9 in)
- Position: Midfielder

Youth career
- –1981: VfB 06 Langenfeld
- 1981–1986: Bayer Leverkusen

Senior career*
Years	Team	Apps	(Gls)
1986–1988	Bayer Leverkusen	2	(0)
1988–1990	Fortuna Köln	34	(2)
1990–1993	FC Berlin	15	(2)
1993–1995	Union Berlin	55	(19)
1995–1997	Hansa Rostock	27	(0)
1997–1999	Tennis Borussia Berlin	5	(0)
1999–2001	BFC Dynamo	12	(1)
Total		150	(24)
- * Club domestic league appearances and goals

Dirk Rehbein (born 14 August 1967 in Langenfeld (Rheinland)) is a German former professional footballer who played as a midfielder.

Rehbein joined FC Berlin in the 1990-91 season. He was the first player from West Germany to join the club. Rehbein became one of the top goal scores of FC Berlin in the early 1990s. Rehbein scored 16 goals for FC Berlin during the 1991-92 regular season.

Rehbein made 29 appearances in the Bundesliga during his playing career. He finished his career with BFC Dynamo.

His son Lukas, born in 1993, signed with BFC Dynamo in 2013.
