= Dejan Raičković =

Montenegrin footballer (born 1967)

Personal information
- Date of birth: 27 October 1967 (age 59)
- Place of birth: Titograd, SFR Yugoslavia
- Height: 1.85 m (6 ft 1 in)
- Position: Defender

Youth career
- 1983–1984: Crvena Stijena

Senior career*
Years	Team	Apps	(Gls)
1984–1992	FK Sarajevo	123	(3)
1992–1994	Hannover 96	57	(3)
1994–1997	Carl Zeiss Jena	58	(3)
1997–2000	Tennis Borussia Berlin	53	(3)
2000–2001	Carl Zeiss Jena	20	(1)
2001–2004	Rot-Weiß Oberhausen	69	(0)
2004–2005	Tennis Borussia Berlin	24	(1)
Total		391	(13)

Managerial career
- 2001: Berliner AK 07
- 2006–2007: Tennis Borussia Berlin
- 2008: Spandauer SV
- * Club domestic league appearances and goals

Dejan Raičković (born 27 October 1967 in Titograd, SFR Yugoslavia) is a Montenegrin football manager and former player.

Raičković in his playing career represented FK Sarajevo, Hannover 96, Carl Zeiss Jena, Rot-Weiß Oberhausen and Tennis Borussia Berlin and played 208 games in the 2. Bundesliga.

After leaving Carl Zeiss Jena, from July to September 2001 Raičković managed Berliner AK 07. He then continued his playing career in Rot-Weiß Oberhausen.
