= Thomas Cichon =

German footballer

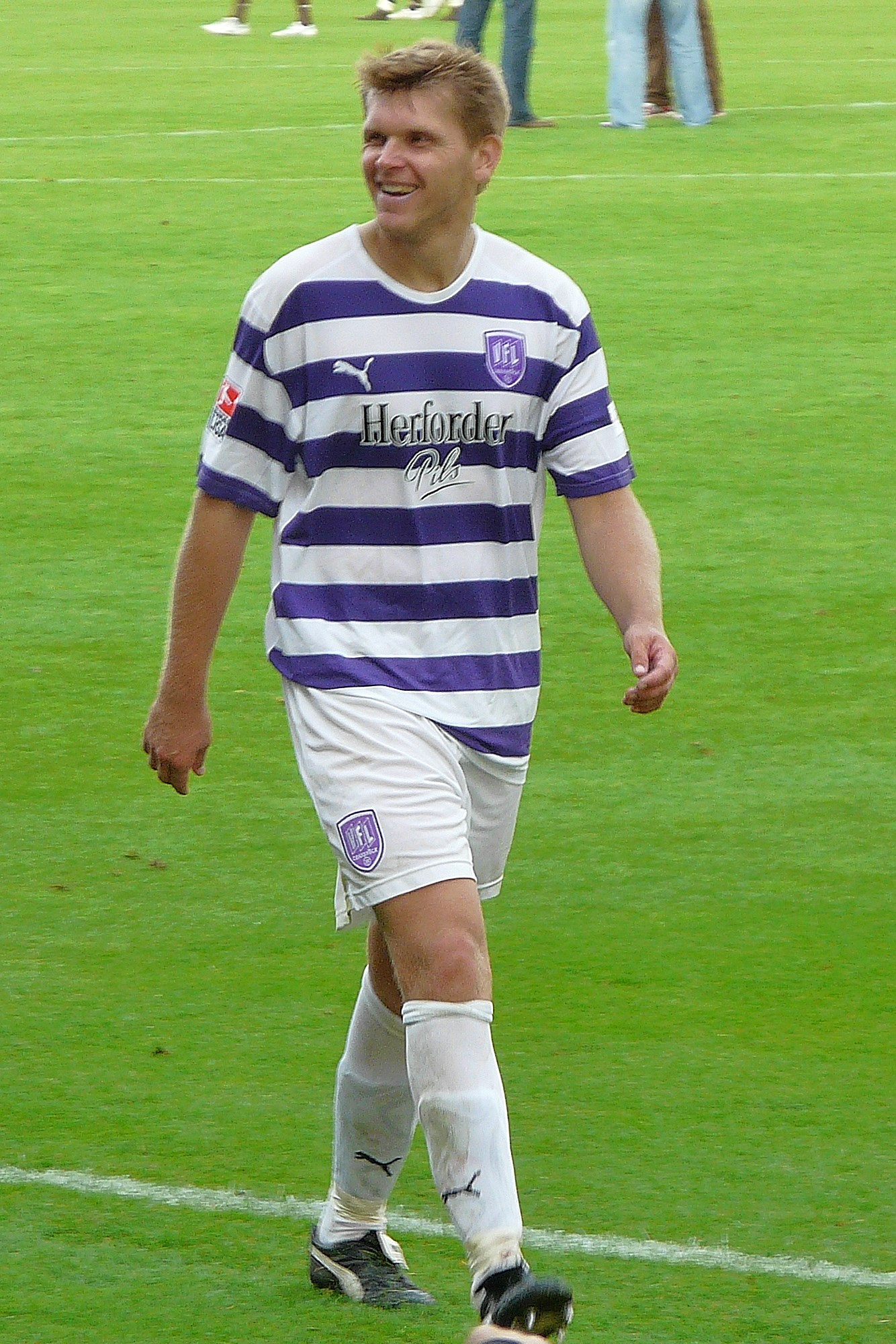
- Cichon with VfL Osnabrück in 2008

Personal information
- Full name: Thomas Joachim Cichon
- Date of birth: 9 July 1976 (age 50)
- Place of birth: Ruda Śląska, Poland
- Height: 1.85 m (6 ft 1 in)
- Position: Centre-back

Youth career
- 1981–1985: BV Altenessen
- 1989–1990: Preußen Essen
- 1990–1995: Schwarz-Weiß Essen

Senior career*
Years	Team	Apps	(Gls)
1995–2004	1. FC Köln	211	(8)
2004–2005	Rot-Weiß Oberhausen	30	(0)
2005	Panionios	6	(0)
2006–2009	VfL Osnabrück	98	(16)
2009–2010	Moroka Swallows	23	(0)
Total		368	(24)

International career
1995–1998	Germany U-21	20	(1)
- * Club domestic league appearances and goals

Thomas Joachim Cichon (Polish: Tomasz Cichoń; born 9 July 1976) is a German former professional footballer who played as a centre-back.

== Involvement in match-fixing ==
In June 2014 Cichon received a nine-month suspended sentence for accessory to fraud and tax fraud for his involvement in the 2009 European football match-fixing scandal. He admitted to having received €20,000 from the gambling mafia in exchange for not giving his full effort in VfL Osnabrück's 3–0 defeat to FC Augsburg on 17 April 2009.
