= Toni Micevski =

Macedonian footballer (born 1970)

Personal information
- Date of birth: 20 January 1970 (age 56)
- Place of birth: Bitola, SR Macedonia, SFR Yugoslavia
- Height: 1.83 m (6 ft 0 in)
- Position: Midfielder

Senior career*
Years	Team	Apps	(Gls)
1987–1990	Poeševo	87	(22)
1990–1991	Novaci	25	(8)
1991–1995	Pelister	110	(37)
1995	Sileks	4	(1)
1996–1998	Hansa Rostock	46	(3)
1998–1999	TeBe Berlin	19	(4)
1999–2000	Pelister	25	(11)
2000–2001	Energie Cottbus	16	(2)
2001–2002	Pobeda	10	(4)
2002–2003	VFL Osnabrück	36	(2)
2004–2006	TSV Wallenhorst		
2006–2007	Eschen/Mauren		
2011	Poeševo		
Total		378	(94)

International career
1993–2002	Macedonia	44	(4)
- * Club domestic league appearances and goals

Toni Micevski (Macedonian: Тони Мицевски; born 20 January 1970) is Macedonian]] former professional footballer who played as a midfielder.

== Club career ==
Micevski was born in Bitola, SFR Yugoslavia. He went on to spend a large part of his professional career in Germany.

== International career ==
Micevski made his senior debut for Macedonia in an October 1993 friendly match away against Slovenia, which was his country's first ever official match, and got 44 caps and four goals. He scored his first goal against Armenia in Skopje on 6 September 1995 (1–2). His final international was an April 2002 friendly against Finland.

== Personal life ==
In 2018, despite his age, he was still playing for FK Poeševo in the Macedonian fourth league group Bitola, together with another well known veteran in Goran Stavrevski.

== Career statistics ==
=== International goals ===
Scores and results list Macedonia's goal tally first, score column indicates score after each Micevski goal.

List of international goals scored by Toni Micevski
No.	Date	Venue	Opponent	Score	Result	Competition
1	6 September 1995	Gradski Stadium, Skopje, Republic of Macedonia	Armenia	1–0	1–2	UEFA Euro 1996 qualifying
2	9 November 1996	Sportpark Eschen-Mauren, Eschen, Liechtenstein	Liechtenstein	6–0	11–1	1998 FIFA World Cup qualification
3	9 November 1996	Sportpark Eschen-Mauren, Eschen, Liechtenstein	Liechtenstein	7–0	11–1	1998 FIFA World Cup qualification
4	28 March 2001	Gradski Stadium, Skopje, Republic of Macedonia	Turkey	1–0	1–2	2002 FIFA World Cup qualification
