= Darko Ramovš =

Serbian footballer

Personal information
- Full name: Darko Ramovš
- Date of birth: 7 April 1973 (age 53)
- Place of birth: Belgrade, SFR Yugoslavia
- Height: 1.87 m (6 ft 1 1/2 in)
- Position: Defender

Youth career
- 1993–1994: Partizan

Senior career*
Years	Team	Apps	(Gls)
1994–1995	Priština	8	(0)
1995–1997	OFK Beograd	44	(3)
1997–1998	Čukarički	20	(1)
1998–2000	Stuttgarter Kickers	63	(1)
2000–2001	1. FC Schweinfurt 05	11	(1)
2001–2005	Čukarički	107	(7)
Total		253	(13)
- * Club domestic league appearances and goals

Darko Ramovš (Serbian Cyrillic: Дарко Рамовш; born 7 April 1973) is a Serbian retired footballer.

He was a sports director in his previous club FK Čukarički from 2005 until 2010. In summer 2013 he was appointed sports director in the newly promoted Serbian First League club FK Sinđelić Beograd.

In the 2015–16 season he was the president of the Assembly of the clubs of the Serbian First League.

From the 2018–19 season he is the General Secretary of the Professional Clubs Association in Serbia, Super League and First League.
