= Oliver Roth (footballer) =

German footballer

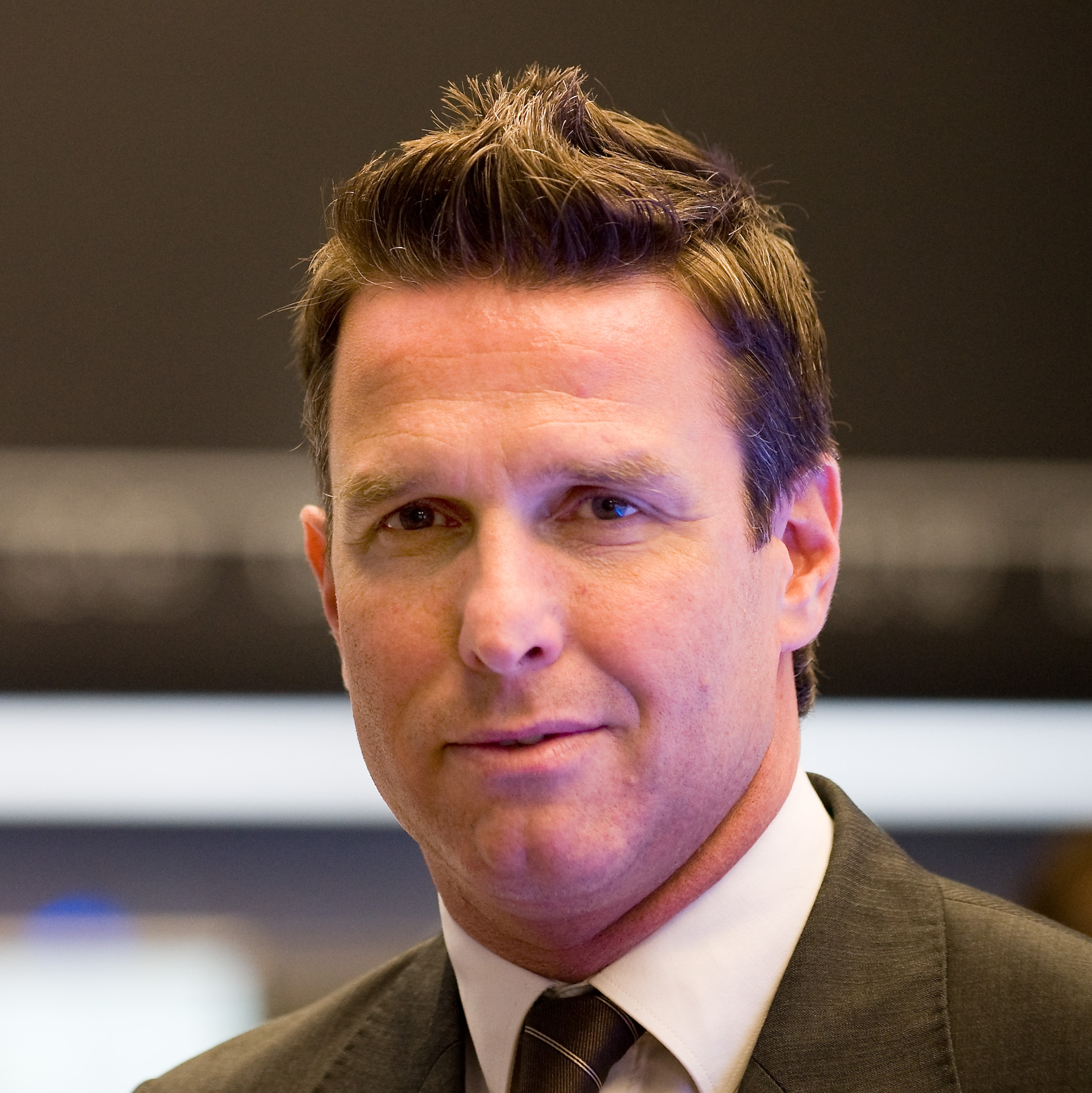
- Roth in 2009

Personal information
- Date of birth: 30 January 1968
- Place of birth: Frankfurt am Main, West Germany
- Position: Forward

Senior career*
Years	Team	Apps	(Gls)
1986–1988	FSV Frankfurt		
1988–1989	Borussia Dortmund	1	(0)
1989–1995	Rot-Weiss Frankfurt		
1995–1996	Birmingham-Southern Panthers		
1996–2000	Kickers Offenbach		

Managerial career
- 2000: Kickers Offenbach
- * Club domestic league appearances and goals

Oliver Roth (born 30 January 1968) is a German former professional footballer who played as a forward.
