= Mike Lünsmann =

German footballer

Personal information
- Full name: Mike Lünsmann
- Date of birth: 23 November 1969 (age 56)
- Place of birth: West Berlin, West Germany
- Height: 1.84 m (6 ft 0 in)
- Position: Striker

Youth career
- Schwarz-Weiß Spandau
- –1988: Tennis Borussia Berlin

Senior career*
Years	Team	Apps	(Gls)
1988–1996	Hertha BSC	216	(43)
1996–1997	LR Ahlen	8	(1)
1997	FC Sachsen Leipzig	17	(15)
1998–2000	Tennis Borussia Berlin	34	(6)
2000–2001	FC Sachsen Leipzig	23	(8)
2001–2004	SV Yeşilyurt	46	(30)
2004–2007	SC Gatow	11	(4)
2008	SCC Berlin	9	(4)
- * Club domestic league appearances and goals

Mike Lünsmann (born 23 November 1969 in Berlin) is a retired German footballer who made over 200 appearances for Hertha BSC.
