= Ilija Aračić =

Croatian footballer

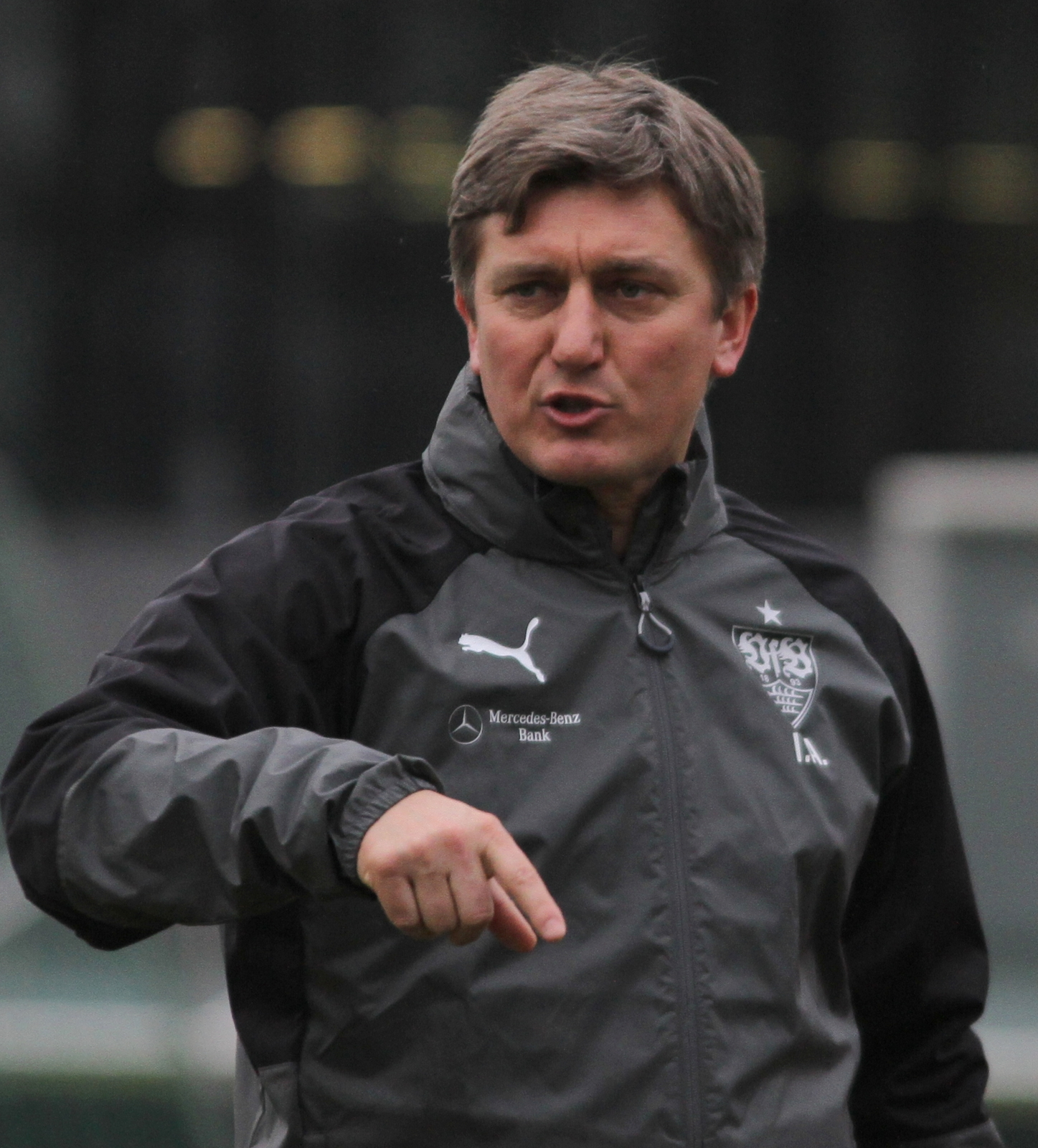

Personal information
- Date of birth: 15 November 1970 (age 55)
- Place of birth: Slavonski Brod, SR Croatia, SFR Yugoslavia
- Height: 1.88 m (6 ft 2 in)
- Position: Striker

Youth career
- 1980–1985: Ukrina Novo Selo
- 1985–1991: Polet Bosanksi Brod

Senior career*
Years	Team	Apps	(Gls)
1991–1993	Slavonski Brod		
1993–1994	Rijeka	19	(2)
1994–1997	Chemnitzer FC	78	(22)
1997–1998	Tennis Borussia Berlin	49	(24)
1999–2000	Hertha BSC	25	(6)
2000–2002	Arminia Bielefeld	36	(3)
Total		188	(55)

Managerial career
- 2004–2011: Augsburg (youth team coach)
- 2012–2015: VfB Stuttgart (youth team coach)
- 2016–2018: FV Illertissen
- 2018: VfB Stuttgart (assistant)
- 2021: CSKA Moscow (assistant)
- 2021–2022: Hertha BSC (assistant)
- * Club domestic league appearances and goals

Ilija Aračić (born 15 November 1970) is a Croatian football coach and a former player who played as a striker.

== Club career ==
Aračić was born in Slavonski Brod, SR Croatia, SFR Yugoslavia. Coming from a sporting family, he started his footballing career as a 9-year-old at Croatian team NK Ukrina Novo Selo, before moving aged 14 to the team his father Anto played for professionally at the time, NK Polet Bosanski Brod. He later played for his local team where he was spotted by scouts of Prva HNL side NK Rijeka. Aračić, a drafter by trade, left Croatia as a result of the War of Independence, signed for Chemnitzer FC in Germany before transferring to Tennis Borussia Berlin in the summer of 1997. During the 1998–99 season, after impressing Hertha BSC with his two goals against them in the DFB-Pokal, quickly signed for TeBe's fellow West Berlin rivals where he played for one and a half years before moving to Arminia Bielefeld and seeing out the twilight of his playing career.

== Post-playing career ==
In 2004 Aračić took over as coach of FC Augsburg's youth team. On 1 January 2012, he became head coach of the under-19 team of VfB Stuttgart. Aračić moved to FV Illertissen in 2016. In January 2018 he returned to VfB Stuttgart and became assistant coach of Tayfun Korkut.
