= Markus Erdmann =

German footballer

Personal information
- Date of birth: 16 July 1969 (age 57)
- Place of birth: West Germany
- Position: Striker

Youth career
- –1994: VfL Nordstemmen

Senior career*
Years	Team	Apps	(Gls)
1994–1995	Hannover 96	3	(2)
1995–1997	SC Harsum		
1997–2003	Arminia Hannover	193	(139)
2003–2004	Sportfreunde Ricklingen		
2004–2009	TuSpo Schliekum		
- * Club domestic league appearances and goals

Markus Erdmann (born 16 July 1969) is a German former professional footballer who played as a striker.
