= VfL Herzlake =

Association football club

- Full name: Verein für Leibesübungen Herzlake von 1921 e.V.
- Founded: 1921
- Ground: Hasetalstadion
- Capacity: 7,000
- League: Kreisliga Emsland (VIII)
- 2015–16: 6th
Home colours	Away colours

VfL Herzlake is a German association football club from the village of Herzlake, Lower Saxony. In addition to a football department, the club has sections for handball, gymnastics, and volleyball.

== History ==
The club was established in 1921 as Fußball-Club Herzlake and in 1927 was renamed Deutsche Jugendkraft Grün-Weiß Hertzlake as part of the DJK-Sportverband, a nationwide sports organization sponsored by the Catholic Church. With the rise to power of the Nazis, faith-based and left-leaning worker's sports organizations were disbanded as politically unpalatable to the regime and the Herzlake club disappeared in 1934.

The end of World War II and the collapse of the Third Reich saw many previously banned clubs re-established, including Herzlake, which was reformed as Verein für Leibesübungen Herzlake in 1946. The team enjoyed its first successes in local level play in the early 70s, advancing to the Landesliga Niedersachsen (V) in 1975, and from there in 1982 into the Verbandsliga Niedersachsen (IV), where they won titles in 1985, 1987, and 1988. A successful promotion round playoff in 1988 advanced VfL to the Oberliga Nord (III) where they were an unremarkable lower-tier side through their first four seasons of play. In 1993, they claimed the division title and took part in the promotion round for the 2. Bundesliga but fared poorly.

The team remained competitive through the mid-90s in what was now the Regionalliga Nord (III), before being renamed VfL Hasetal Herzlake in 1997. They spent two more seasons in the Regionalliga before finishing in the relegation zone at the end of the 1998–99 season. The poor financial condition of the club drove them all the way down to the Kreisliga Emsland (VIII) and they resumed the name VfL Herzlake. They slipped further still, to the Kreisklasse Weser/Ems (IX) in 2000, and recovered briefly to play in the Kreisliga and Bezirksliga before being relegated to the Kreisliga again in 2013, where they play today.

== Honours ==
The club's honours:

- Verbandsliga Niedersachsen (IV)
  - Champions: 1985, 1987, 1988
- Oberliga Nord (III)
  - Champions: 1993
