= 1998–99 2. Bundesliga =

25th season of the second-tier football league in Germany

2. Bundesliga
- Season: 1998–99
- Champions: Arminia Bielefeld
- Promoted: Arminia Bielefeld; SpVgg Unterhaching; SSV Ulm 1846
- Relegated: FC Gütersloh; KFC Uerdingen 05; SG Wattenscheid 09; Fortuna Düsseldorf
- Matches: 306
- Top goalscorer: Bruno Labbadia (28 goals)
- Average attendance: 8,613

The 1998–99 2. Bundesliga season was the twenty-fifth season of the 2. Bundesliga, the second tier of the German football league system.

Arminia Bielefeld, SpVgg Unterhaching and SSV Ulm 1846 were promoted to the Bundesliga while FC Gütersloh, KFC Uerdingen 05, SG Wattenscheid 09 and Fortuna Düsseldorf were relegated to the Regionalliga.

== League table ==
For the 1998–99 season SSV Ulm 1846, Rot-Weiß Oberhausen, Hannover 96 and Tennis Borussia Berlin were newly promoted to the 2. Bundesliga from the Regionalliga while Karlsruher SC, 1. FC Köln and Arminia Bielefeld had been relegated to the league from the Bundesliga.

Locations of the participating teams of the 1998–99 season

Pos	Team	Pld	W	D	L	GF	GA	GD	Pts	Promotion or relegation
1	Arminia Bielefeld (C, P)	34	20	7	7	62	32	+30	67	Promotion to Bundesliga
2	SpVgg Unterhaching (P)	34	19	6	9	47	30	+17	63	Promotion to Bundesliga
3	SSV Ulm 1846 (P)	34	15	13	6	63	51	+12	58	Promotion to Bundesliga
4	Hannover 96	34	16	9	9	52	36	+16	57	
5	Karlsruher SC	34	17	5	12	54	43	+11	56	
6	Tennis Borussia Berlin	34	15	9	10	47	39	+8	54	
7	Mainz 05	34	14	8	12	48	44	+4	50	
8	SpVgg Greuther Fürth	34	13	10	11	40	31	+9	49	
9	FC St. Pauli	34	12	9	13	49	46	+3	45	
10	1. FC Köln	34	12	9	13	46	53	−7	45	
11	Energie Cottbus	34	13	10	11	48	42	+6	49	
12	Rot-Weiß Oberhausen	34	9	14	11	40	47	−7	41	
13	Stuttgarter Kickers	34	11	8	15	38	53	−15	41	
14	Fortuna Köln	34	9	13	12	49	55	−6	40	
15	FC Gütersloh (R)	34	10	7	17	39	58	−19	37	Relegation to Regionalliga (Note: All four teams were relegated to the Regionalliga West/Südwest.)
16	KFC Uerdingen (R)	34	7	10	17	34	57	−23	31	Relegation to Regionalliga
17	SG Wattenscheid 09 (R)	34	7	9	18	31	46	−15	30	Relegation to Regionalliga
18	Fortuna Düsseldorf (R)	34	5	13	16	35	59	−24	28	Relegation to Regionalliga

Source: Bundesliga.de
Rules for classification: 1) points; 2) goal difference; 3) number of goals scored.
(C) Champions; (P) Promoted; (R) Relegated

== Results ==
Home \ Away	TBB	DSC	FCE	F95	SGF	FCG	H96	KSC	KOE	FKO	M05	RWO	STP	SKI	KFC	ULM	UNT	SGW
Tennis Borussia Berlin	—	1–1	1–0	1–1	2–1	2–0	3–1	3–2	1–1	3–2	3–0	2–2	0–2	0–2	3–1	0–2	1–1	1–0
Arminia Bielefeld	3–1	—	2–0	2–0	2–1	3–0	0–1	0–1	0–0	2–1	1–0	2–0	0–0	1–2	1–0	5–0	2–0	1–0
Energie Cottbus	2–2	0–2	—	0–1	1–1	5–1	1–0	4–0	2–3	2–0	2–2	0–2	0–3	2–0	5–0	3–0	4–2	2–0
Fortuna Düsseldorf	2–2	2–2	0–3	—	0–0	3–1	1–1	0–1	2–1	2–2	0–3	2–2	2–2	0–0	2–2	1–3	1–3	1–1
Greuther Fürth	1–2	2–0	0–0	1–0	—	3–2	0–1	1–2	0–1	4–0	3–1	1–1	1–0	1–0	0–0	2–0	0–0	2–1
FC Gütersloh	1–0	0–2	1–1	2–2	1–0	—	2–1	2–0	0–1	2–1	6–1	0–3	1–4	1–0	2–0	1–1	1–1	2–1
Hannover 96	0–0	2–1	2–0	0–2	1–1	4–1	—	1–0	6–1	3–3	3–2	1–1	3–0	2–1	3–1	1–1	0–1	2–1
Karlsruher SC	0–0	1–1	3–2	3–1	1–0	2–3	1–0	—	3–1	4–2	0–1	3–1	3–0	6–0	0–1	1–2	1–0	2–1
1. FC Köln	1–0	3–5	2–2	1–0	1–0	1–1	0–2	4–1	—	0–3	2–1	2–1	1–4	0–1	4–0	1–1	0–1	2–1
Fortuna Köln	1–3	1–1	3–0	2–1	1–4	3–2	3–0	0–1	4–2	—	2–0	0–0	1–1	2–1	1–1	2–2	0–2	1–2
Mainz 05	0–3	3–1	0–0	0–0	3–0	1–0	1–0	4–1	2–1	1–1	—	0–0	3–0	2–2	3–0	1–1	1–0	2–0
Rot-Weiß Oberhausen	0–2	1–5	3–1	1–3	0–2	3–0	1–1	2–0	0–4	0–0	2–1	—	3–2	1–1	0–0	2–2	0–2	1–0
FC St. Pauli	1–0	1–2	1–1	5–0	0–2	1–0	0–2	1–0	0–0	0–0	2–1	1–1	—	6–2	2–3	0–1	1–1	1–0
Stuttgarter Kickers	1–0	2–2	1–0	1–0	2–2	2–1	2–2	2–2	2–0	2–2	1–3	2–0	1–3	—	0–1	1–2	1–0	0–2
KFC Uerdingen	2–3	0–4	0–0	4–1	0–2	2–0	0–1	1–3	2–2	1–2	1–2	2–2	1–1	0–1	—	2–1	3–0	0–0
SSV Ulm	2–0	6–2	2–2	4–2	0–0	1–1	1–1	1–5	2–2	3–3	4–2	1–0	4–1	3–2	2–2	—	3–1	2–0
SpVgg Unterhaching	3–1	0–2	1–0	1–0	4–1	2–0	3–1	1–1	2–0	3–0	1–0	0–0	2–1	2–0	2–0	2–0	—	1–0
SG Wattenscheid	0–1	0–2	1–1	2–0	1–1	1–1	0–3	0–0	1–1	0–0	1–1	2–4	4–2	2–0	2–1	0–3	4–2	—

Source: DFB
Legend: Blue = home team win; Yellow = draw; Red = away team win.

== Top scorers ==
The league's top scorers:

Goals	Player	Team
28	(Germany) Bruno Labbadia	Arminia Bielefeld
19	(Germany) Rainer Krieg	Karlsruher SC
16	(Netherlands) Arie van Lent	SpVgg Greuther Fürth
14	(Federal Republic of Yugoslavia) Dragan Trkulja	SSV Ulm 1846
14	(Germany) Achim Weber	Rot-Weiß Oberhausen
13	(Germany) Thomas Brdarić	Fortuna Köln
12	(Australia) David Zdrilic	SSV Ulm 1846
11	(Germany) Steffen Heidrich	FC Energie Cottbus
11	(Germany) Gustav Policella	1. FSV Mainz 05
11	(Albania) Igli Tare	Fortuna Düsseldorf

== Attendances ==
No.	Team	Attendance	Change	Highest
1	Hannover 96	19,229	136.9%	48,000
2	Karlsruher SC	16,082	-39.9%	24,600
3	1. FC Köln	14,488	-51.4%	32,000
4	FC St. Pauli	13,422	-16.9%	15,502
5	Arminia Bielefeld	12,117	-43.5%	22,512
6	SSV Ulm	11,206	318.7%	19,000
7	Fortuna 95	8,888	-26.7%	18,000
8	FC Energie Cottbus	7,646	-10.6%	11,746
9	Mainz 05	7,255	-8.9%	14,730
10	FC Gütersloh	7,235	-14.6%	12,500
11	Greuther Fürth	7,040	-15.7%	9,500
12	Fortuna Köln	6,771	111.6%	41,000
13	RW Oberhausen	4,462	56.4%	8,163
14	Tennis Borussia Berlin	4,459	254.1%	10,800
15	KFC Uerdingen 05	4,275	-11.6%	10,404
16	Stuttgarter Kickers	4,043	0.5%	8,421
17	SpVgg Unterhaching	3,712	25.6%	8,200
18	Wattenscheid 09	2,697	-15.0%	4,821
