= 1996–97 DFB-Pokal =

Tournament details
- Country: Germany
- Teams: 64

Final positions
- Champions: VfB Stuttgart
- Runners-up: Energie Cottbus

Tournament statistics
- Matches played: 63
- Top goal scorer: Bernhard Winkler (4)

The 1996–97 DFB-Pokal was the 54th season of the annual German football cup competition. Sixty-four teams competed in the tournament of six rounds which began on 9 August 1996 and ended on 16 June 1997. In the final, VfB Stuttgart defeated third tier Energie Cottbus 2–0, thereby claiming their third title.

== Matches ==
Times up to 26 October 1996 and from 30 March 1997 are CEST (UTC+2). Times from 27 October 1996 to 29 March 1997 are CET (UTC+1).

=== First round ===
9 August 1996	1. FC Nürnberg	1–0	Mainz 05	Nuremberg
	Wiesinger 64'	Report (in German)		Stadium: Frankenstadion; Attendance: 12,900; Referee: Bastian (Frankfurt)

10 August 1996	Hamburger SV (A)	1–3	Arminia Bielefeld	Hamburg
	Krausz 31' (pen.)	Report (in German)	Stratos 29'; Meißner 40'; Rauffmann 86'	Stadium: Edmund-Plambeck-Stadion; Attendance: 4,200; Referee: Bernd Hauer (Celle)

10 August 1996	FC Bremerhaven	2–3	Karlsruher SC	Bremerhaven
	Schuster 11' (o.g.); Toborg 27'	Report (in German)	Reich 29'; Häßler 57'; Schroth 87'	Attendance: 3,300; Referee: Füllbrunn (Ihrhove)

10 August 1996	FC Schweinfurt 05	2–5	Hansa Rostock	Schweinfurt
	Lerch 23'; Rögele 65'	Report (in German)	Ziemer 5', 30'; Zallmann 8'; Barbarez 56'; Beinlich 72'	Attendance: 5,000; Referee: Müller (Dresden)

10 August 1996	SV Bonlanden	2–4 (a.e.t.)	VfL Bochum	Bonlanden
	Schweizer 64'; Frömmel 71'	Report (in German)	Kracht 73'; Winkler 86'; Peschel 119', 120'	Attendance: 3,000; Referee: Jörg Friedrichs (Ilvesheim)

10 August 1996	Rot-Weiss Oberhausen	1–4	FC St. Pauli	Oberhausen
	T. Pröpper 25'	Report (in German)	Trulsen 57'; Émerson 60'; C. Pröpper 85'; Sobotzik 88'	Stadium: Niederrheinstadion; Attendance: 7,000; Referee: Christian Wack (Gersheim)

10 August 1996	Tennis Borussia Berlin	0–3	Bayern Munich	Berlin
		Report (in German)	Nerlinger 49'; Scholl 88'; Strunz 90'	Attendance: 39,500; Referee: Hellmut Krug (Gelsenkirchen)

10 August 1996	FV Donaueschingen	1–3	1. FC Köln	Donaueschingen
	Limberger 40'	Report (in German)	Munteanu 5'; Baumann 50'; Vladoiu	Attendance: 4,200; Referee: Kammerer (Karlsruhe)

10 August 1996	Bayer Leverkusen (A)	1–3 (a.e.t.)	MSV Duisburg	Leverkusen
	Şimşek 39'	Report (in German)	Marin 70', 108'; Löbe 92'	Attendance: 5,100; Referee: Schütz (Norken)

10 August 1996	SpVgg Greuther Fürth	1–0	1. FC Kaiserslautern	Fürth
	Lotter	Report (in German)		Attendance: 7,500; Referee: Norbert Dörr (Griesheim)

10 August 1996	Kickers Emden	1–3	Fortuna Düsseldorf	Emden
	Mushangazhike 71'	Report (in German)	Seeliger 53'; Katemann 75'; Judt 80'	Attendance: 9,000; Referee: Heinz-Dieter Casper (Dortmund)

10 August 1996	VfR Mannheim	0–2	Borussia Mönchengladbach	Mannheim
		Report (in German)	Pettersson 30', 89'	Attendance: 11,200; Referee: Burkhard Hufgard (Mömbris)

10 August 1996	VfB Stuttgart	0–0 (a.e.t.) (4–1 p)	Fortuna Köln	Stuttgart
		Report (in German)		Stadium: Gottlieb-Daimler-Stadion; Attendance: 6,000; Referee: Helmut Fleischer (Ulm)
	Penalties
	Balakov (penalty scored); Legat (penalty scored); Soldo (penalty scored); Verlaat (penalty scored)		Lottner (penalty missed); De Wit (penalty scored); Hey (penalty missed)

10 August 1996	KFC Uerdingen	0–2	SC Freiburg	Krefeld
		Report (in German)	Jurčević 37'; Wassmer 81'	Stadium: Grotenburg-Stadion; Attendance: 3,100; Referee: Georg Dardenne (Nettersheim)

10 August 1996	Greifswalder SC	0–3	SpVgg Unterhaching	Greifswald
		Report (in German)	Radlspeck 20'; Strehmel 42'; García 88'	Stadium: Volksstadion; Attendance: 1,100; Referee: Michael Wendorf (Berlin)

10 August 1996	Borussia Neunkirchen	1–1 (a.e.t.) (5–4 p)	VfB Leipzig	Neunkirchen
	Seibert 44'	Report (in German)	Shala 90'	Stadium: Ellenfeldstadion; Attendance: 1,800; Referee: Holger Dehmelt (Sabachwalden)
	Penalties
	Racanel (penalty scored); Melunović (penalty scored); Torunarigha (penalty scored); Adeyemi (penalty scored); Schäfer (penalty scored)		Shala (penalty missed); Schößler (penalty scored); Heidrich (penalty scored); Weichert (penalty scored); Franklin (penalty scored)

10 August 1996	Wacker Nordhausen	1–5	1860 Munich	Nordhausen
	Gorges 38'	Report (in German)	Winkler 8', 76', 89'; Walker 60'; Schwabl 86'	Attendance: 5,200; Referee: Christian Schößling (Leipzig)

10 August 1996	SSV Ulm 1846	0–2	Schalke 04	Ulm
		Report (in German)	Max 4'; Linke 18'	Stadium: Donaustadion; Attendance: 9,000; Referee: Stark (Landshut)

11 August 1996	SG Wattenscheid 09	4–3 (a.e.t.)	Borussia Dortmund	Wattenscheid
	Ristau 42'; Dikhtyar 50'; Skok 69'; Bläker 115'	Report (in German)	Zorc 14'; Herrlich 75'; Reuter 88'	Stadium: Lohrheidestadion; Attendance: 9,600; Referee: Michael Malbranc (Hamburg)

11 August 1996	TuS Paderborn-Neuhaus	1–3	Hamburger SV	Paderborn
	Ewen 70'	Report (in German)	Bäron 15'; Dowe 20'; Breitenreiter 60'	Attendance: 10,000; Referee: Jürgen Jansen (Essen)

11 August 1996	Chemnitzer FC	0–1	Waldhof Mannheim	Chemnitz
		Report (in German)	Kobylański 67'	Stadium: Stadion an der Gellertstraße; Attendance: 3,500; Referee: Peter Weise (Gera)

11 August 1996	FSV Salmrohr	1–3	VfB Oldenburg	Salmtal
	Thömmes 45'	Report (in German)	Szubert 78'; Zierott 85'; Janiak 87'	Attendance: 500; Referee: Christian Wack (Gersheim)

11 August 1996	SV Wehen	1–2	VfB Lübeck	Taunusstein
	Raab 53'	Report (in German)	Schwerinski 36'; Hoffmann 59'	Stadium: Stadion am Halberg; Attendance: 1,500; Referee: Manfred Isam (Köln)

11 August 1996	VfB Leipzig (A)	0–4	VfL Wolfsburg	Leipzig
		Report (in German)	Meißner 24'; Maucksch 40' (pen.); Probst 50'; Präger 75'	Attendance: 800; Referee: Keßler (Jena)

11 August 1996	Karlsruher SC (A)	2–0	Carl Zeiss Jena	Nuremberg
	Kolinger 44'; Hörner 64'	Report (in German)		Stadium: Frankenstadion; Attendance: 12,900; Referee: Bastian (Frankfurt)

11 August 1996	Holstein Kiel	2–4	Eintracht Frankfurt	Kiel
	Habermann 40'; Bertermann 82'	Report (in German)	Tskhadadze 11'; Ekström 33'; Gaudino 47'; Güntensperger 90'	Stadium: Holsteinstadion; Attendance: 4,500; Referee: Carsten Byernetzki (Hamburg)

11 August 1996	TSG Pfeddersheim	1–2	FSV Zwickau	Pfeddersheim
	Ritschel 82'	Report (in German)	Kirsten 48', 87'	Attendance: 1,200; Referee: Joachim Neis (Theley)

11 August 1996	Werder Bremen	1–1 (a.e.t.) (5–3 p)	Bayer Leverkusen	Bremen
	Cardoso 103' (pen.)	Report (in German)	Rydlewicz 92'	Stadium: Weserstadion; Attendance: 11,900; Referee: Bernd Heynemann (Magdeburg)
	Penalties
	Herzog (penalty scored); Cardoso (penalty scored); Brand (penalty scored); Bode (penalty scored); Beschastnykh (penalty scored)		Paulo Sérgio (penalty scored); Heintze (penalty scored); Happe (penalty scored); Wörns (penalty missed)

11 August 1996	Energie Cottbus	1–0 (a.e.t.)	Stuttgarter Kickers	Cottbus
	Woltmann 114'	Report (in German)		Stadium: Stadion der Freundschaft; Attendance: 4,000; Referee: Sather (Grimma)

11 August 1996	SSV Vorsfelde	0–2	SV Meppen	Wolfsburg
		Report (in German)	Vorholt 55'; Lau 90'	Stadium: Drömlingstadion, A-Platz; Attendance: 1,100; Referee: Hahne (Hannover)

11 August 1996	Lokomotive Altmark Stendal	1–5	Hertha BSC	Stendal
	Wiedemann 41' (pen.)	Report (in German)	Fährmann 23'; Kruse 30'; Preetz 51'; Mazingu-Dinzey 62'; Čović 85'	Stadium: Stadion am Hölzchen; Attendance: 3,500; Referee: Carsten Kadach (Suderburg)

11 August 1996	Hannover 96	1–0	FC Gütersloh	Hannover
	Ostermann 14'	Report (in German)		Attendance: 6,900; Referee: Scheibel (Calbe)

=== Second round ===
31 August 1996	Karlsruher SC	2–0	Hansa Rostock	Karlsruhe
	Keller 71'; Dundee 85'	Report (in German)		Stadium: Wildparkstadion; Attendance: 14,000; Referee: Bernd Heynemann (Magdeburg)

31 August 1996	MSV Duisburg	1–0 (a.e.t.)	VfB Lübeck	Duisburg
	Hopp 113'	Report (in German)		Stadium: Wedaustadion; Attendance: 5,000; Referee: Bernhard Zerr (Ottersweier)

31 August 1996	Borussia Neunkirchen	1–3	FC St. Pauli	Neunkirchen
	Hummel 47'	Report (in German)	Sobotzik 77', 89'; Schweißing 78'	Stadium: Ellenfeldstadion; Attendance: 6,000; Referee: Torsten Koop (Lüttermark)

31 August 1996	SV Meppen	6–1	Eintracht Frankfurt	Meppen
	Ukrow 1'; Helmer 5'; Claaßen 37'; Lau 48'; Bujan 58'; Winter 59'	Report (in German)	Ekström 17'	Stadium: Emslandstadion; Attendance: 10,000; Referee: Jürgen Jansen (Essen)

31 August 1996	Energie Cottbus	1–0	VfL Wolfsburg	Cottbus
	Seifert 87'	Report (in German)		Stadium: Stadion der Freundschaft; Attendance: 5,700; Referee: Heinz-Dieter Casper (Dortmund)

31 August 1996	SpVgg Greuther Fürth	1–0	1. FC Nürnberg	Fürth
	Lotter 27'; Dumpert 63'	Report (in German)	Radoki 50' (o.g.)	Attendance: 44,200; Referee: Hellmut Krug (Gelsenkirchen)

1 September 1996	FSV Zwickau	3–1 (a.e.t.)	1. FC Köln	Zwickau
	Günther 70'; Kirsten 118'; Klee 120'	Report (in German)	Gaißmayer 17'	Stadium: Westsachsenstadion; Attendance: 11,400; Referee: Franz-Xaver Wack (Biberbach)

1 September 1996	SG Wattenscheid 09	0–0 (a.e.t.) (2–4 p)	Karlsruher SC (A)	Karlsruhe
		Report (in German)		Stadium: Wildparkstadion, Platz 2 Referee: Ralf Hilmes (Nordhorn)
	Penalties
	Ristau (penalty scored); Süs (penalty scored); Gumprecht (penalty missed); Balzis (penalty missed)		Kolinger (penalty scored); Hurle (penalty scored); Streichsbier (penalty scored); Süngül (penalty scored)

17 September 1996	VfB Oldenburg	1–2	Werder Bremen	Oldenburg
	Elberfeld 38'	Report (in German)	Brand 71'; Labbadia 81'	Stadium: Marschwegstadion; Attendance: 15,200; Referee: Markus Merk (Otterbach)

18 September 1996	Arminia Bielefeld	0–1	SpVgg Unterhaching	Bielefeld
		Report (in German)	Radlspeck 75'	Stadium: Bielefelder Alm; Attendance: 5,000; Referee: Uwe Kemmling (Kleinburgwedel)

1 October 1996	Fortuna Düsseldorf	1–4	Hamburger SV	Düsseldorf
	Nielsen 89'	Report (in German)	Spörl 16'; Breitenreiter 32'; Schupp 50'; Salihamidžić 86'	Stadium: Rheinstadion; Attendance: 7,500; Referee: Edgar Steinborn (Sinzig)

1 October 1996	Schalke 04	2–3	VfL Bochum	Gelsenkirchen
	Wilmots 35'; Held 47'	Report (in German)	Guðjónsson 1', 30'; Bałuszyński 60'	Stadium: Parkstadion; Attendance: 20,200; Referee: Michael Malbranc (Hamburg)

1 October 1996	Waldhof Mannheim	0–1	SC Freiburg	Mannheim
		Report (in German)	Spanring 71'	Attendance: 12,500; Referee: Alfons Berg (Konz)

1 October 1996	Hannover 96	2–4	1860 Munich	Hannover
	Milovanović 20' (pen.); Kovacec 31'	Report (in German)	Nowak 15'; Winkler 30'; Borimirov 69'; Cerny 84'	Attendance: 42,000; Referee: Frank Fleske (Eisenhüttenstadt)

1 October 1996	Hertha BSC	1–1 (a.e.t.) (4–5 p)	VfB Stuttgart	Berlin
	Mazingu-Dinzey 3'	Report (in German)	Hagner 13'	Stadium: Olympiastadion; Attendance: 37,400; Referee: Wagner (Hofheim)
	Penalties
	Karl (penalty scored); Preetz (penalty scored); Kober (penalty missed); Mazingu-Dinzey (penalty scored); Kruse (penalty scored); Arnold (penalty missed)		Berthold (penalty missed); Legat (penalty scored); Gilewicz (penalty scored); Verlaat (penalty scored); Wohlfahrt (penalty scored); Herzog (penalty scored)

2 October 1996	Borussia Mönchengladbach	1–2	Bayern Munich	Mönchengladbach
	Neun 9'	Report (in German)	Strunz 28'; Zickler 85'	Attendance: 34,500; Referee: Hartmut Strampe (Handorf)

=== Round of 16 ===
22 October 1996	1860 Munich	1–2	Hamburger SV	Munich
	Borimirov 68'	Report (in German)	Schopp 65'; Schupp 80'	Attendance: 15,500; Referee: Bernd Heynemann (Magdeburg)

22 October 1996	FC St. Pauli	1–0	SpVgg Unterhaching	Hamburg
	Pisarev 73'	Report (in German)		Stadium: Stadion am Millerntor; Attendance: 12,000; Referee: Wolfgang Friedrichs (Lennestadt)

22 October 1996	SC Freiburg	2–1	SV Meppen	Freiburg
	Decheiver 72' (pen.); Spanring 86'	Report (in German)	Thoben 53'	Stadium: Dreisamstadion; Attendance: 14,000; Referee: Wagner (Hofheim)

22 October 1996	Karlsruher SC (A)	0–1	VfL Bochum	Karlsruhe
		Report (in German)	Közle 66'	Stadium: Wildparkstadion, Platz 2 Attendance: 3,000; Referee: Christian Wack (Gersheim)

23 October 1996	Energie Cottbus	2–2 (a.e.t.) (5–4 p)	MSV Duisburg	Cottbus
	Konetzke 67'; Melzig 96'	Report (in German)	Wohlert 89'; Bičanić 99'	Stadium: Stadion der Freundschaft; Attendance: 8,000; Referee: Uwe Kemmling (Kleinburgwedel)
	Penalties
	Jesse (penalty scored); Benken (penalty scored); Zöphel (penalty scored); Kronhardt (penalty scored); Woltmann (penalty scored)		Hirsch (penalty scored); Bičanić (penalty scored); Anders (penalty scored); Marin (penalty scored); Kienle (penalty missed)

23 October 1996	SpVgg Greuther Fürth	1–3	Karlsruher SC	Fürth
	Dürr 89' (pen.)	Report (in German)	Reich 2'; Dundee 14'; Probst 65' (o.g.)	Attendance: 11,800; Referee: Lutz Pohlmann (Felde)

23 October 1996	VfB Stuttgart	2–0	FSV Zwickau	Stuttgart
	Giovane Élber 36'; Bobic 81'	Report (in German)		Stadium: Gottlieb-Daimler-Stadion; Attendance: 10,500; Referee: Jürgen Jansen (Essen)

12 November 1996	Bayern Munich	3–1	Werder Bremen	Munich
	Klinsmann 45', 89'; Ziege 65'	Report (in German)	Bode 13'	Stadium: Olympiastadion; Attendance: 32,000; Referee: Georg Dardenne (Nettersheim)

=== Quarter-finals ===
12 November 1996	Energie Cottbus	0–0 (a.e.t.) (5–4 p)	FC St. Pauli	Cottbus
		Report (in German)		Stadium: Stadion der Freundschaft; Attendance: 12,400; Referee: Jürgen Jansen (Essen)
	Penalties
	Wenschlag (penalty scored); Zöphel (penalty scored); Benken (penalty missed); Woltmann (penalty scored); Zimmerling (penalty scored); Jesse (penalty scored)		Scharping (penalty scored); Springer (penalty missed); Trulsen (penalty scored); Sobotzik (penalty scored); Bochtler (penalty scored); Scherz (penalty missed)

13 November 1996	Hamburger SV	2–1	VfL Bochum	Hamburg
	Schopp 39'; Cardoso 82'	Report (in German)	Közle 63'	Attendance: 17,200; Referee: Lutz Michael Fröhlich (Berlin)

13 November 1996	SC Freiburg	1–1 (a.e.t.) (2–4 p)	VfB Stuttgart	Freiburg
	Spanring 62'	Report (in German)	Bobic 48'	Stadium: Dreisamstadion; Attendance: 22,500; Referee: Herbert Fandel (Kyllburg)
	Penalties
	Schmadtke (penalty missed); Spanring (penalty scored); Decheiver (penalty scored); Sutter (penalty missed)		Verlaat (penalty scored); Soldo (penalty scored); Foda (penalty scored); Wohlfahrt (penalty scored)

19 February 1997	Karlsruher SC	1–0	Bayern Munich	Karlsruhe
	Fink 21'	Report (in German)		Stadium: Wildparkstadion; Attendance: 33,000; Referee: Hans-Jürgen Weber (Essen)

=== Semi-finals ===
15 April 1997	Energie Cottbus	3–0	Karlsruher SC	Cottbus
	Kronhardt 64'; Irrgang 68'; Konetzke 82'	Report (in German)		Stadium: Stadion der Freundschaft; Attendance: 21,000; Referee: Alfons Berg (Konz)

16 April 1997	VfB Stuttgart	2–1	Hamburger SV	Stuttgart
	Balakov 15'; Schneider 60'	Report (in German)	Hartmann 19'	Stadium: Gottlieb-Daimler-Stadion; Attendance: 48,000; Referee: Georg Dardenne (Nettersheim)

=== Final ===
14 June 1997
19:00 CEST

VfB Stuttgart	2–0	Energie Cottbus
Élber 18', 52'	Report

Olympiastadion, Berlin
Attendance: 76,400
Referee: Edgar Steinborn (Sinzig)
