= 1994–95 Regionalliga =

1st season of the Regionalliga as a third-level league

Regionalliga
- Season: 1994–95
- Promoted: VfB Lübeck; Carl Zeiss Jena; Arminia Bielefeld; SpVgg Unterhaching
- Relegated: Göttingen 05; FC Bremerhaven; TuS Hoisdorf; BSV Brandenburg; BFC Türkiyemspor; SCB Preußen Köln; SV Edenkoben; VfB Wissen; Kickers Offenbach; SV Lohhof; SV Wehen; Rot-Weiß Frankfurt
- Amateur Championship: VfL Osnabrück; FC Sachsen Leipzig; SC Verl; Stuttgarter Kickers
- Matches played: 1,224
- Goals scored: 3,635 (2.97 per match)
- Top goalscorer: Jonathan Akpoborie (Stuttgarter Kickers) - 37

The 1994–95 Regionalliga season was the first year of the Regionalliga as the third tier of German football. There were four regional sections, Nord, Nordost, West-Südwest and Süd, each with eighteen teams. Most teams qualified from the Oberliga, which dropped to become a fourth-tier league, while five teams were relegated from the previous year's 2. Bundesliga. In the Nord section, four teams were promoted from the formerly fourth-tier Verbandsliga.

The four regional champions were all promoted directly to the 2. Bundesliga. The four runners-up entered the Amateur Championship, which was not a promotion playoff. Twelve teams were relegated, although the amount per region varied depending on the teams relegated from the second tier.

This was the last season of two points for a win, before it was increased to three.

== Regionalliga Nord ==
The Regionalliga Nord covered the states of Bremen, Hamburg, Lower Saxony and Schleswig-Holstein.

=== Teams ===
The division largely replaced the Oberliga Nord, with fourteen of the teams qualifying directly from that division. FC Bremerhaven, SC Concordia, Lüneburger SK and SV Wilhelmshaven all earned promotion from the Verbandsliga.

=== Final table ===
| Pos | Team | Pld | W | D | L | GF | GA | GD | Pts | Promotion, qualification or relegation |
|---|---|---|---|---|---|---|---|---|---|---|
| 1 | VfB Lübeck (C, P) | 34 | 20 | 8 | 6 | 76 | 39 | +37 | 48 | Promotion to 2. Bundesliga |
| 2 | VfL Osnabrück | 34 | 19 | 8 | 7 | 68 | 36 | +32 | 46 | Qualification for German Amateur Championship |
| 3 | VfL Herzlake | 34 | 15 | 12 | 7 | 54 | 41 | +13 | 42 | |
| 4 | Kickers Emden | 34 | 14 | 13 | 7 | 51 | 42 | +9 | 41 | |
| 5 | VfB Oldenburg | 34 | 14 | 12 | 8 | 49 | 39 | +10 | 40 | |
| 6 | Eintracht Braunschweig | 34 | 10 | 16 | 8 | 49 | 43 | +6 | 36 | |
| 7 | Werder Bremen (A) | 34 | 14 | 7 | 13 | 44 | 37 | +7 | 35 | |
| 8 | Lüneburger SK | 34 | 11 | 13 | 10 | 48 | 36 | +12 | 35 | |
| 9 | SV Wilhelmshaven | 34 | 14 | 6 | 14 | 63 | 53 | +10 | 34 | |
| 10 | SV Lurup | 34 | 11 | 11 | 12 | 56 | 49 | +7 | 33 | |
| 11 | Holstein Kiel | 34 | 12 | 9 | 13 | 44 | 45 | −1 | 33 | |
| 12 | VfL 93 Hamburg | 34 | 8 | 16 | 10 | 31 | 40 | −9 | 32 | |
| 13 | TuS Celle | 34 | 12 | 8 | 14 | 63 | 53 | +10 | 32 | |
| 14 | Hamburger SV (A) | 34 | 12 | 8 | 14 | 47 | 62 | −15 | 32 | |
| 15 | SC Concordia | 34 | 10 | 9 | 15 | 47 | 47 | 0 | 29 | |
| 16 | Göttingen 05 (R) | 34 | 9 | 10 | 15 | 34 | 47 | −13 | 28 | Relegation to Oberliga |
| 17 | FC Bremerhaven (R) | 34 | 9 | 7 | 18 | 39 | 67 | −28 | 25 | Relegation to Oberliga |
| 18 | TuS Hoisdorf (R) | 34 | 4 | 3 | 27 | 26 | 83 | −57 | 11 | Relegation to Oberliga |

(C) Champions; (P) Promoted; (R) Relegated

=== Top scorers ===
| # | Player | Club | Goals |
|---|---|---|---|
| 1. | (Germany) Christian Claaßen | SV Wilhelmshaven | 26 |
| 2. | (Germany) Arie van Lent | Werder Bremen (A) | 20 |
| 3. | (Germany) Frank Grobitzsch | SV Lurup | 15 |
| 3. | (Germany) Frank Hartmann | VfL Osnabrück | 15 |
| 3. | (Germany) Daniel Jurgeleit | VfB Lübeck | 15 |
| 6. | (Croatia) Boris Ekmeščić | VfB Oldenburg | 14 |
| 6. | (Germany) Hendryk Lau | VfL Herzlake | 14 |
| 8. | (Germany) Michael Koch | VfB Lübeck | 13 |
| 8. | (Croatia) Kreso Kovacec | SC Concordia | 13 |
| 8. | (Germany) Markus Stanko | Göttingen 05 | 13 |

== Regionalliga Nordost ==
The Regionalliga Nordost covered the states of Berlin, Brandenburg, Mecklenburg-Vorpommern, Saxony, Saxony-Anhalt and Thuringia. This amounts to the former East Germany, as well as West Berlin.

=== Teams ===
Tennis Borussia Berlin and Carl Zeiss Jena were relegated from the 2. Bundesliga, while the remaining 16 teams came from the NOFV-Oberliga.

- BSV Brandenburg, EFC Stahl, FC Berlin, FSV Optik Rathenow, Reinickendorfer Füchse, Spandauer SV and BFC Türkiyemspor from the NOFV-Oberliga Nord
- Energie Cottbus, Hertha BSC (A), Hertha Zehlendorf, FSV Lok Altmark Stendal and 1. FC Union Berlin from the NOFV-Oberliga Mitte
- Bischofswerdaer FV, Erzgebirge Aue, Rot-Weiß Erfurt and FC Sachsen Leipzig from the NOFV-Oberliga Süd

=== Final table ===
| Pos | Team | Pld | W | D | L | GF | GA | GD | Pts | Promotion, qualification or relegation |
|---|---|---|---|---|---|---|---|---|---|---|
| 1 | Carl Zeiss Jena (C, P) | 34 | 23 | 8 | 3 | 74 | 17 | +57 | 54 | Promotion to 2. Bundesliga |
| 2 | FC Sachsen Leipzig | 33 | 20 | 11 | 2 | 63 | 24 | +39 | 51 | Qualification for German Amateur Championship |
| 3 | 1. FC Union Berlin | 34 | 18 | 11 | 5 | 75 | 36 | +39 | 47 | |
| 4 | Tennis Borussia Berlin | 34 | 19 | 9 | 6 | 69 | 33 | +36 | 47 | |
| 5 | Rot-Weiß Erfurt | 34 | 18 | 8 | 8 | 66 | 34 | +32 | 44 | |
| 6 | Reinickendorfer Füchse | 34 | 15 | 10 | 9 | 53 | 41 | +12 | 40 | |
| 7 | Energie Cottbus | 34 | 12 | 14 | 8 | 54 | 40 | +14 | 38 | |
| 8 | EFC Stahl | 34 | 11 | 15 | 8 | 52 | 48 | +4 | 37 | |
| 9 | Erzgebirge Aue | 34 | 11 | 10 | 13 | 53 | 47 | +6 | 32 | |
| 10 | Hertha Zehlendorf | 34 | 9 | 12 | 13 | 42 | 55 | −13 | 30 | |
| 11 | FC Berlin | 34 | 9 | 10 | 15 | 53 | 64 | −11 | 28 | |
| 12 | Bischofswerdaer FV | 34 | 8 | 12 | 14 | 36 | 48 | −12 | 28 | |
| 13 | Spandauer SV | 34 | 10 | 7 | 17 | 49 | 77 | −28 | 27 | |
| 14 | FSV Optik Rathenow | 34 | 7 | 12 | 15 | 36 | 55 | −19 | 26 | |
| 15 | FSV Lok Altmark Stendal | 34 | 8 | 10 | 16 | 33 | 56 | −23 | 26 | |
| 16 | Hertha BSC (A) | 34 | 9 | 6 | 19 | 42 | 70 | −28 | 24 | |
| 17 | BSV Brandenburg (R) | 34 | 8 | 1 | 25 | 34 | 82 | −48 | 17 | Relegation to Oberliga |
| 18 | BFC Türkiyemspor (R) | 34 | 5 | 6 | 23 | 26 | 83 | −57 | 16 | Relegation to Oberliga |

(C) Champions; (P) Promoted; (R) Relegated

=== Top scorers ===
| # | Player | Club | Goals |
|---|---|---|---|
| 1. | (Germany) Thomas Adler | Tennis Borussia Berlin | 20 |
| 1. | (North Macedonia) Goran Markov | 1. FC Union Berlin | 20 |
| 3. | (Germany) Bernd Jopek | Spandauer SV | 19 |
| 3. | (Germany) Mark Zimmermann | Carl Zeiss Jena | 19 |
| 5. | (Germany) Carsten Klee | FC Sachsen Leipzig | 18 |
| 6. | (Germany) Danilo Kunze | Erzgebirge Aue | 17 |
| 7. | (Germany) Detlef Irrgang | Energie Cottbus | 16 |
| 8. | (Germany) Peter Kaehlitz | Hertha Zehlendorf | 15 |
| 8. | (Germany) Hans-Jörg Leitzke | FC Sachsen Leipzig | 15 |
| 10. | (Bosnia and Herzegovina) Sergej Barbarez | 1. FC Union Berlin | 14 |
| 10. | (Germany) Matthias Zimmerling | Energie Cottbus | 14 |
| 12. | (Germany) Uwe Schulz | FSV Optik Rathenow | 13 |
| 12. | (Germany) Michael Steffen | FC Berlin | 13 |
| 14. | (Germany) Rainer Wiedemann | FSV Lok Altmark Stendal | 12 |

== Regionalliga West/Südwest ==
The Regionalliga West/Südwest covered the states of North Rhine-Westphalia, Rhineland Palatinate and Saarland.

=== Teams ===
- Rot-Weiß Essen and Wuppertaler SV were relegated from the 2. Bundesliga
- Alemannia Aachen, 1. FC Bocholt, Bonner SC, and SCB Preußen Köln came from the Oberliga Nordrhein
- Borussia Neunkirchen, SV Edenkoben, Eintracht Trier, SC Hauenstein, FSV Salmrohr and VfB Wissen from the Oberliga Südwest
- Arminia Bielefeld, SpVgg Erkenschwick, TuS Paderborn-Neuhaus, Preußen Münster, SC Verl and SG Wattenscheid 09 (A) from the Oberliga Westfalen

=== Final table ===
| Pos | Team | Pld | W | D | L | GF | GA | GD | Pts | Promotion, qualification or relegation |
|---|---|---|---|---|---|---|---|---|---|---|
| 1 | Arminia Bielefeld (C, P) | 34 | 20 | 10 | 4 | 65 | 28 | +37 | 50 | Promotion to 2. Bundesliga |
| 2 | SC Verl | 34 | 15 | 14 | 5 | 64 | 35 | +29 | 44 | Qualification for German Amateur Championship |
| 3 | FSV Salmrohr | 34 | 19 | 6 | 9 | 57 | 33 | +24 | 44 | |
| 4 | Rot-Weiß Essen | 34 | 17 | 9 | 8 | 62 | 40 | +22 | 43 | |
| 5 | Wuppertaler SV | 34 | 16 | 8 | 10 | 63 | 43 | +20 | 40 | |
| 6 | Alemannia Aachen | 34 | 16 | 8 | 10 | 66 | 50 | +16 | 40 | |
| 7 | Eintracht Trier | 34 | 13 | 12 | 9 | 50 | 48 | +2 | 38 | |
| 8 | Borussia Neunkirchen | 34 | 13 | 10 | 11 | 37 | 44 | −7 | 36 | |
| 9 | TuS Paderborn-Neuhaus | 34 | 12 | 11 | 11 | 61 | 53 | +8 | 35 | |
| 10 | Preußen Münster | 34 | 11 | 13 | 10 | 47 | 44 | +3 | 35 | |
| 11 | SpVgg Erkenschwick | 34 | 11 | 12 | 11 | 46 | 47 | −1 | 34 | |
| 12 | Bonner SC | 34 | 11 | 12 | 11 | 51 | 55 | −4 | 34 | |
| 13 | 1. FC Bocholt | 34 | 10 | 9 | 15 | 43 | 52 | −9 | 29 | |
| 14 | SG Wattenscheid 09 (A) | 34 | 7 | 14 | 13 | 41 | 58 | −17 | 28 | |
| 15 | SC Hauenstein | 34 | 6 | 15 | 13 | 41 | 54 | −13 | 27 | |
| 16 | SCB Preußen Köln (R) | 34 | 7 | 8 | 19 | 45 | 78 | −33 | 22 | Relegation to Oberliga |
| 17 | SV Edenkoben (R) | 34 | 4 | 10 | 20 | 32 | 67 | −35 | 18 | Relegation to Oberliga |
| 18 | VfB Wissen (R) | 34 | 4 | 7 | 23 | 31 | 73 | −42 | 15 | Relegation to Oberliga |

(C) Champions; (P) Promoted; (R) Relegated

=== Top scorers ===
| # | Player | Club | Goals |
|---|---|---|---|
| 1. | (Germany) Jörg Beyel | SCB Preußen Köln | 21 |
| 2. | (Germany) Angelo Vier | SC Verl | 20 |
| 3. | (Poland) Marek Czakon | Eintracht Trier | 17 |
| 4. | (Germany) Wolfram Klein | Rot-Weiß Essen | 16 |
| 4. | (Germany) Stephan Lämmermann | Alemannia Aachen | 16 |
| 6. | (Germany) Ralf Sturm | Wuppertaler SV | 15 |
| 7. | (Netherlands) Eric Groeleken | TuS Paderborn-Neuhaus | 14 |
| 8. | (Germany) Achim Weber | Wuppertaler SV | 13 |
| 8. | (Germany) Markus Wuckel | Arminia Bielefeld | 13 |
| 10. | (Germany) Jürgen Serr | Preußen Münster | 12 |
| 10. | (Germany) Guido Silberbach | SG Wattenscheid 09 (A) | 12 |
| 10. | (Germany) Frank Süs | Borussia Neunkirchen | 12 |

== Regionalliga Süd ==
The Regionalliga Süd covered the states of Baden-Württemberg, Bavaria and Hessen.

=== Teams ===
- Stuttgarter Kickers were relegated from the 2. Bundesliga
- TSF Ditzingen, SpVgg Ludwigsburg, VfR Mannheim, SSV Reutlingen, SSV Ulm 1846 came from the Oberliga Baden-Württemberg
- FC Augsburg, Bayern Munich (A), SpVgg Fürth, SV Lohhof, SpVgg Unterhaching, TSV Vestenbergsgreuth from the Bayernliga
- SV Darmstadt 98, SG Egelsbach, Hessen Kassel, Kickers Offenbach, Rot-Weiß Frankfurt and SV Wehen from the Oberliga Hessen

=== Final table ===
| Pos | Team | Pld | W | D | L | GF | GA | GD | Pts | Promotion, qualification or relegation |
|---|---|---|---|---|---|---|---|---|---|---|
| 1 | SpVgg Unterhaching (C, P) | 34 | 24 | 6 | 4 | 81 | 32 | +49 | 54 | Promotion to 2. Bundesliga |
| 2 | Stuttgarter Kickers | 34 | 23 | 5 | 6 | 96 | 33 | +63 | 51 | Qualification for German Amateur Championship |
| 3 | SpVgg Fürth | 34 | 19 | 9 | 6 | 67 | 47 | +20 | 47 | |
| 4 | SSV Ulm 1846 | 34 | 20 | 5 | 9 | 69 | 45 | +24 | 45 | |
| 5 | TSV Vestenbergsgreuth | 34 | 19 | 6 | 9 | 56 | 31 | +25 | 44 | |
| 6 | TSF Ditzingen | 34 | 16 | 8 | 10 | 63 | 54 | +9 | 40 | |
| 7 | Bayern Munich (A) | 34 | 12 | 12 | 10 | 42 | 44 | −2 | 36 | |
| 8 | VfR Mannheim | 34 | 12 | 10 | 12 | 55 | 55 | 0 | 34 | |
| 9 | FC Augsburg | 34 | 14 | 6 | 14 | 48 | 52 | −4 | 34 | |
| 10 | SpVgg Ludwigsburg | 34 | 13 | 7 | 14 | 47 | 51 | −4 | 33 | |
| 11 | SV Darmstadt 98 | 34 | 11 | 9 | 14 | 49 | 53 | −4 | 31 | |
| 12 | SG Egelsbach | 34 | 12 | 6 | 16 | 41 | 44 | −3 | 30 | |
| 13 | Hessen Kassel | 34 | 9 | 11 | 14 | 50 | 64 | −14 | 29 | |
| 14 | SSV Reutlingen | 34 | 9 | 8 | 17 | 43 | 66 | −23 | 26 | |
| 15 | Kickers Offenbach (R) | 34 | 9 | 7 | 18 | 41 | 54 | −13 | 25 | Relegation to Oberliga |
| 16 | SV Lohhof (R) | 34 | 7 | 9 | 18 | 41 | 54 | −13 | 23 | Relegation to Oberliga |
| 17 | SV Wehen (R) | 34 | 6 | 6 | 22 | 37 | 78 | −41 | 18 | Relegation to Oberliga |
| 18 | Rot-Weiß Frankfurt (R) | 34 | 4 | 4 | 26 | 39 | 102 | −63 | 12 | Relegation to Oberliga |

(C) Champions; (P) Promoted; (R) Relegated

=== Top scorers ===
| # | Player | Club | Goals |
|---|---|---|---|
| 1. | (Nigeria) Jonathan Akpoborie | Stuttgarter Kickers | 37 |
| 2. | (Germany) Sean Dundee | TSF Ditzingen | 24 |
| 3. | (Germany) Markus Sailer | Stuttgarter Kickers | 21 |
| 4. | (Spain) Alfonso Garcia | SpVgg Unterhaching | 20 |
| 5. | (Germany) Markus Beierle | SSV Ulm 1846 | 19 |
| 6. | (Germany) Bernd Müller | SpVgg Fürth | 17 |
| 6. | (Germany) Frank Türr | SpVgg Fürth | 17 |
| 8. | (Germany) Gerd Klaus | TSV Vestenbergsgreuth | 16 |
| 9. | (Bosnia and Herzegovina) Haris Karamehmedović | VfR Mannheim | 15 |
| 10. | (Germany) Gianni Covelli | SpVgg Ludwigsburg | 12 |
| 10. | (Germany) Carsten Lakies | SV Darmstadt 98 | 12 |
| 10. | (Burkina Faso) Kassoum Ouédraogo | KSV Hessen Kassel | 12 |
