= 1997 DFB-Pokal final =

- Match programme cover
- Event: 1996–97 DFB-Pokal
VfB Stuttgart	Energie Cottbus
2	0
- Date: 14 June 1997
- Venue: Olympiastadion, Berlin
- Referee: Edgar Steinborn (Sinzig)
- Attendance: 76,400
- Weather: Partly cloudy 21 °C (70 °F); 64% humidity

The 1997 DFB-Pokal final decided the winner of the 1996–97 DFB-Pokal, the 54th season of Germany's premier knockout football cup competition. It was played on 14 June 1997 at the Olympiastadion in Berlin. VfB Stuttgart won the match 2–0 against third-division Energie Cottbus to claim their third cup title, qualifying for the 1997–98 UEFA Cup Winners' Cup and the 1997 DFB-Ligapokal.

== Route to the final ==
The DFB-Pokal began with 64 teams in a single-elimination knockout cup competition. There were a total of five rounds leading up to the final. Teams were drawn against each other, and the winner after 90 minutes would advance. If still tied, 30 minutes of extra time was played. If the score was still level, a penalty shoot-out was used to determine the winner.

Note: In all results below, the score of the finalist is given first (H: home; A: away).

VfB Stuttgart		Round	Energie Cottbus
Opponent	Result	1996–97 DFB-Pokal	Opponent	Result
Fortuna Köln (H)	0–0 (a.e.t.) (4–1 p)	Round 1	Stuttgarter Kickers (H)	1–0 (a.e.t.)
Hertha BSC (A)	1–1 (a.e.t.) (5–4 p)	Round 2	VfL Wolfsburg (H)	1–0
FSV Zwickau (H)	2–0	Round of 16	MSV Duisburg (H)	2–2 (a.e.t.) (5–4 p)
SC Freiburg (A)	0–0 (a.e.t.) (4–2 p)	Quarter-finals	FC St. Pauli (H)	0–0 (a.e.t.) (5–4 p)
Hamburger SV (H)	2–1	Semi-finals	Karlsruher SC (H)	3–0

== Match ==
=== Details ===
14 June 1997
19:00 CEST

VfB Stuttgart	2–0	Energie Cottbus
Élber 18', 52'	Report

Olympiastadion, Berlin
Attendance: 76,400
Referee: Edgar Steinborn (Sinzig)

VfB Stuttgart	Energie Cottbus

GK	1	(Austria) Franz Wohlfahrt
SW	5	(Netherlands) Frank Verlaat (c)
CB	8	(Germany) Marco Haber	Booked
CB	4	(Germany) Thomas Berthold
RWB	7	(Germany) Matthias Hagner		(substituted off) 70'
LWB	3	(Germany) Thorsten Legat
CM	20	(Croatia) Zvonimir Soldo	Booked
CM	16	(Germany) Gerhard Poschner
AM	10	(Bulgaria) Krasimir Balakov
CF	9	(Brazil) Giovane Élber		(substituted off) 89'
CF	11	(Germany) Fredi Bobic		(substituted off) 81'
Substitutes:
GK	25	(Germany) Marc Ziegler
DF	14	(Germany) Thomas Schneider		(substituted in) 70'
MF	12	(Germany) Danny Schwarz		(substituted in) 89'
MF	21	(Switzerland) Sébastien Fournier
MF	22	(Germany) Andreas Buck
FW	15	(Poland) Radosław Gilewicz		(substituted in) 81'
FW	35	(Federal Republic of Yugoslavia) Sreto Ristić
Manager:
(Germany) Joachim Löw

GK	1	(Germany) Kay Wehner
SW	3	(Germany) Thomas Hoßmang
CB	4	(Germany) Sven Benken
CB	5	(Germany) Jens Melzig (c)	Booked
RWB	7	(Germany) Ingo Schneider		(substituted off) 65'
LWB	14	(Germany) Jörg Woltmann		(substituted off) 81'
DM	21	(Germany) Willi Kronhardt
CM	8	(Germany) Jens-Uwe Zöphel
CM	6	(Germany) Detlef Irrgang
CF	17	(Germany) Frank Seifert		(substituted off) 65'
CF	9	(Germany) Toralf Konetzke
Substitutes:
GK	31	(Germany) Edmund Rottler
DF	23	(Germany) Kay Wenschlag
MF	12	(Bosnia and Herzegovina) Igor Lazić		(substituted in) 65'
MF	15	(Germany) Michael Hennig
MF	16	(Germany) Lars Mebus
MF	24	(France) Moses Enguelle		(substituted in) 81'
FW	11	(Germany) Matthias Zimmerling		(substituted in) 65'
Manager:
(Germany) Eduard Geyer

Match rules

- 90 minutes.
- 30 minutes of extra time if necessary.
- Penalty shoot-out if scores still level.
- Seven named substitutes, of which up to three may be used.
