= List of FC Energie Cottbus records and statistics =

This article has details on FC Energie Cottbus statistics.

== Recent seasons (from 1991 onwards) ==
Year	Division	Position	Points	Goal difference	Top goalscorers
1991–92	NOFV-Oberliga Mitte (III)	3rd	52:24	+49	
1992–93	NOFV-Oberliga Mitte (III)	3rd	44:20	+28	
1993–94	NOFV-Oberliga Mitte (III)	2nd	43:17	+40	
1994–95	Regionalliga Nordost (III)	7th	38:30	+14	
1995–96	Regionalliga Nordost (III)	3rd	71	+44	
1996–97	Regionalliga Nordost (III)	1st	82	+63	
1997–98	2. Bundesliga (II)	8th	45	+2	(Germany) Detlef Irrgang 7, (Germany) Toralf Konetzke 6, (Croatia) Antun Labak 5
1998–99	2. Bundesliga (II)	11th	41	+6	(Germany) Steffen Heidrich 10, (Brazil) Franklin Bittencourt 7, (Germany) Detlef Irrgang 5, (Germany) Marcel Rath 5
1999–00	2. Bundesliga (II)	3rd	58	+20	(Croatia) Antun Labak 15, (Brazil) Franklin Bittencourt 10, (Benin) Moussa Latoundji 6, (Hungary) Vasile Miriuță 6
2000–01	Bundesliga (I)	14th	39	-14	(Hungary) Vasile Miriuță 11, (Croatia) Antun Labak 7
2001–02	Bundesliga (I)	13th	35	-24	(Bosnia and Herzegovina) Marko Topić 7, (Poland) Radosław Kałużny 5
2002–03	Bundesliga (I)	18th	30	-30	(Bosnia and Herzegovina) Marko Topić 6, (Poland) Andrzej Juskowiak 5
2003–04	2. Bundesliga (II)	4th	54	+8	(Uruguay) Santiago Silva 9, (Romania) Laurențiu Reghecampf 9, (Romania) Adrian Iordache 5, (United States) Gregg Berhalter 5
2004–05	2. Bundesliga (II)	14th	39	-13	(Morocco) Youssef Mokhtari 8
2005–06	2. Bundesliga (II)	3rd	58	+16	(Romania) Sergiu Radu 12, (Canada) Kevin McKenna 10, (Cameroon) Francis Kioyo 8
2006–07	Bundesliga (I)	13th	41	-11	(Romania) Sergiu Radu 14, (Romania) Vlad Munteanu 11
2007–08	Bundesliga (I)	14th	36	-21	(Albania) Ervin Skela 7, (Bulgaria) Dimitar Rangelov 6, (Denmark) Dennis Sørensen 6
2008–09	Bundesliga (I)	16th	30	-27	(Bulgaria) Dimitar Rangelov 9
2009–10	2. Bundesliga (II)	9th	47	+6	(Romania) Emil Jula 12, (Germany) Nils Petersen 10, (China) Shao Jiayi 8, (Croatia) Stiven Rivić 5, (Cameroon) Léonard Kweuke 5
2010–11	2. Bundesliga (II)	6th	55	+13	(Germany) Nils Petersen 25, (Romania) Emil Jula 10, (Germany) Uwe Hünemeier 9
2011–12	2. Bundesliga (II)	14th	35	-19	(Bulgaria) Dimitar Rangelov 12
2012–13	2. Bundesliga (II)	8th	48	+5	
2013–14	2. Bundesliga (II)	18th	25	-24	
2014–15	3. Liga (III)	7th	56	0	(Germany) Tim Kleindienst 13
2015–16	3. Liga (III)	19th	41	-20	
2016–17	Regionalliga Nordost (IV)	2nd	66	+32	
2017–18	Regionalliga Nordost (IV)	1st	89	+65	
2018–19	3. Liga (III)	17th	45	-7	(Germany) Streli Mamba 11
2019–20	Regionalliga Nordost (IV)	3rd			
2020–21	Regionalliga Nordost (IV)	9th			
2021–22	Regionalliga Nordost (IV)	3rd	74	+50	(Germany) Erik Engelhardt 19
2022–23	Regionalliga Nordost (IV)	1st	70	+37	(Germany) Nicolas Wähling 12
2023–24	Regionalliga Nordost (IV)	1st	71	+31	(Germany) Tim Heike 21
2024–25	3. Liga (III)	4th	62	+10	(Germany) Tolcay Ciğerci 15
2025–26	3. Liga (III)	2nd	72	+21	(Germany) Tolcay Ciğerci 17

== Honours ==
- German Cup:
  - Runners-up 1997
- Regionalliga Nordost:
  - Winners 1997 (III), 2018 (IV), 2023 (IV), 2024 (IV)
- German Under 17 championship:
  - runners-up 2004
