= 1999–2000 TSV 1860 Munich season =

TSV 1860 Munich
1999–2000 season
- Manager: Werner Lorant
- Stadium: Olympic Stadium
- Bundesliga: 4th
- DFB-Pokal: Third round
- Top goalscorer: Martin Max (19)

== Season summary ==
1860 Munich finished fourth in the Bundesliga and qualified for the Champions League third qualifying round.

== Kit ==
1860 Munich's kit was manufactured by Nike and sponsored by tourism company FTI.

== First team squad ==
Squad at end of season

Note: Flags indicate national team as defined under FIFA eligibility rules; some limited exceptions apply. Players may hold more than one non-FIFA nationality.

No.	Pos.	Nation	Player
1	GK	GER	Michael Hofmann
2	DF	GER	Stephan Paßlack
3	DF	AUS	Ned Zelic
4	DF	GER	Marco Kurz
6	MF	CZE	Roman Týce
7	MF	AUT	Marcus Pürk
8	MF	AUT	Christian Prosenik
9	FW	POL	Martin Max (Note: Max was born in Tarnowskie Góry, Poland, but also qualified to represent Germany internationally and made his international debut for Germany in April 2002.)
10	MF	GER	Thomas Häßler
11	FW	GER	Bernhard Winkler
12	MF	GER	Filip Tapalović (Note: Tapalović was born in Gelsenkirchen, West Germany (now Germany), but also qualified to represent Croatia internationally and made his international debut for Croatia in 2002.)
13	MF	AUT	Harald Cerny
15	DF	GER	Holger Greilich

No.	Pos.	Nation	Player
17	MF	BUL	Daniel Borimirov
18	FW	AUS	Paul Agostino
19	DF	GER	Guido Gorges
20	MF	CZE	Martin Čížek
21	FW	GER	Markus Schroth
22	GK	GER	Daniel Hoffmann
23	DF	GER	Thomas Riedl
28	MF	GER	Thomas Meggle
29	FW	GER	Olaf Bodden
33	MF	COD	Michél Mazingu-Dinzey (Note: Mazingu-Dinzey was born in West Berlin, West Germany (now Berlin, Germany), but also qualified to represent the Democratic Republic of the Congo internationally and made his international debut for the Democratic Republic of the Congo in January 1996.)
35	MF	GHA	Awudu Issaka
36	DF	AUT	Martin Stranzl
39	DF	CZE	Tomáš Votava

=== Left club during season ===
Note: Flags indicate national team as defined under FIFA eligibility rules; some limited exceptions apply. Players may hold more than one non-FIFA nationality.

No.	Pos.	Nation	Player
5	DF	NED	Gerald Vanenburg (retired)
16	MF	GER	Jörg Scherbe (to Energie Cottbus)

No.	Pos.	Nation	Player
32	DF	GER	Thomas Richter (to Magdeburg)

== Competitions ==
=== Legend ===
Win Draw Loss Postponed

=== Bundesliga ===
==== League table ====
Pos	Team	Pld	W	D	L	GF	GA	GD	Pts	Qualification or relegation
2	Bayer Leverkusen	34	21	10	3	74	36	+38	73	Qualification to Champions League group stage
3	Hamburger SV	34	16	11	7	63	39	+24	59	Qualification to Champions League third qualifying round
4	1860 Munich	34	14	11	9	55	48	+7	53	Qualification to Champions League third qualifying round
5	1. FC Kaiserslautern	34	15	5	14	54	59	−5	50	Qualification to UEFA Cup first round
6	Hertha BSC	34	13	11	10	39	46	−7	50	Qualification to UEFA Cup first round

Source: www.dfb.de
Rules for classification: 1) points; 2) goal difference; 3) number of goals scored.
