= Mike Jesse =

German footballer

Personal information
- Full name: Mike Jesse
- Date of birth: 1 May 1973 (age 53)
- Place of birth: Königs Wusterhausen, Bezirk Potsdam, East Germany
- Height: 1.85 m (6 ft 1 in)
- Positions: Right back; wing back

Youth career
- 1989-1990: BFC Dynamo

Senior career*
| Years | Team | Apps | (Gls) |
| 1990–1994 | FC Berlin | 90 | (5) |
| 1994–1995 | BSV Brandenburg | | |
| 1995–2000 | Energie Cottbus | 128 | (0) |
| 2000–2001 | Tennis Borussia Berlin | 22 | (5) |
| 2001–2002 | BFC Dynamo | | |
| 2002–2005 | Ludwigsfelder FC | | |
| 2005–2010 | RSV Waltersdorf | | |
- * Club domestic league appearances and goals

Mike Jesse (born 1 May 1973) is a former professional German footballer.

Jesse began playing football for enterprise sports communities BSG Chemie Schmöckwitz, BSG Motor Wildau, BSG Lokomotive Schöneweide and BSG Rotation Berlin. He then joined the youth department of football club BFC Dynamo in 1989.

Jesse made his first appearance with the first team of BFC Dynamo, then named FC Berlin, as a substitute for Jens-Uwe Zöphel away against F.C. Hansa Rostock in the 17th matchday of the 1990-91 NOFV-Oberliga on 17 March 1991. He then became a regular player for FC Berlin the 1991-92 NOFV-Oberliga.

Jesse left FC Berlin for BSV Brandeburg after the 1993–94 season. He scored six goals in 33 games for BSV Brandenburg in the 1994-95 Regionalliga Nordost. He was then signed by FC Energie Cottbus for the following season. Jesse had success in the 1996-97 DFB-Pokal with FC Energie Cottbus. The team made it all the way to the final. However, Jesse did not appear in the final. He then achieved promotion to the 2. Bundesliga with FC Energie Cottbus in the 1996-97 Regionaliga Nordost. Jesse made 74 appearances for FC Energie Cottbus in the 2. Bundesliga.
