= Propper (surname) =

Propper is a surname. Notable people with the name include:

- Robin Pröpper (born 1993), Dutch footballer
- Davy Pröpper (born 1993), Dutch footballer
- Carsten Pröpper (born 1967), German footballer
- Thomas Pröpper (born 1970), German footballer
- Günter Pröpper (born 1941), German footballer
- Theodor Pröpper (1896–1979), German church organist and composer
- Henry Pröpper (1906–1995), Dutch military officer
- Eduardo Propper de Callejón (1895–1972), Spanish diplomat
- Katherine Propper (born 1993), American film director and screenwriter
- Carol Propper, British economist
- Cynthia Propper (1926–1982), American writer
