= 1996–97 Regionalliga =

3rd season of the Regionalliga as a third-level league

Regionalliga
- Season: 1996–97
- Champions: Hannover 96 (N); Energie Cottbus (NO); SG Wattenscheid 09 (W/SW); 1. FC Nürnberg (S)
- Promoted: Energie Cottbus; SG Wattenscheid 09; 1. FC Nürnberg; SpVgg Greuther Fürth
- Relegated: SC Concordia; FC Altona 93; FC St. Pauli (A); Lüneburger SK; SV Lurup; SC Charlottenburg; FSV Velten 90; SC Hauenstein; 1. FC Bocholt; SV Elversberg; SpVgg Ludwigsburg; SG Quelle Fürth; SG Egelsbach
- Matches played: 1,224
- Goals scored: 3,555 (2.9 per match)
- Top goalscorer: Hakan Cengiz (VfL Herzlake) - 28

The 1996–97 Regionalliga was the third season of the Regionalliga as the third tier of German football. The league was organised in four regional divisions, Nord, Nordost, West-Südwest and Süd.

FC Energie Cottbus, SG Wattenscheid 09, 1. FC Nürnberg and SpVgg Greuther Fürth were promoted to the 2. Bundesliga.

== North ==
=== Final table ===
Pos	Team	Pld	W	D	L	GF	GA	GD	Pts	Qualification or relegation
1	Hannover 96 (C)	34	26	5	3	105	25	+80	83	Qualification to promotion play-off
2	Eintracht Braunschweig	34	25	3	6	77	26	+51	78	
3	SV Werder Bremen II	34	21	5	8	71	36	+35	68	
4	VfL Osnabrück	34	17	13	4	51	21	+30	64	
5	Hamburger SV II	34	19	7	8	66	40	+26	64	
6	TuS Celle FC	34	16	5	13	57	57	0	53	
7	1. SC Norderstedt	34	13	11	10	57	36	+21	50	
8	VfL Herzlake	34	14	7	13	54	56	−2	49	
9	Kickers Emden	34	10	11	13	40	49	−9	41	
10	SC Göttingen 05	34	8	15	11	33	42	−9	39	
11	Sportfreunde Ricklingen	34	9	10	15	36	60	−24	37	
12	SV Atlas Delmenhorst	34	10	6	18	48	60	−12	36	
13	SV Wilhelmshaven	34	9	8	17	35	58	−23	35	
14	Concordia Hamburg (R)	34	7	12	15	35	56	−21	33	Relegation to Oberliga
15	FC Altona 93 (Note: Altona 93 withdrew from the league.) (R)	34	7	9	18	33	68	−35	30	Relegation to Oberliga
16	FC St. Pauli II (R)	34	6	12	16	25	61	−36	30	Relegation to Oberliga
17	Lüneburger SK (R)	34	7	7	20	31	61	−30	28	Relegation to Oberliga
18	SV Lurup Hamburg (R)	34	5	8	21	32	74	−42	23	Relegation to Oberliga

(C) Champions; (R) Relegated

=== Results ===
Home \ Away	A93	EBR	WBR	TSC	ATL	EMD	G05	CON	HAM	H96	HER	LÜN	LUR	NOR	OSN	RIC	STP	WIL
FC Altona 93	—	0–2	0–2	1–2	0–3	2–2	1–1	2–1	1–5	1–6	1–0	5–0	2–2	0–4	0–1	2–1	2–0	3–3
Eintracht Braunschweig	2–0	—	2–0	4–1	3–1	3–1	3–0	2–0	0–2	3–2	2–0	3–0	7–0	3–0	1–1	2–1	6–0	2–0
SV Werder Bremen II	0–1	3–1	—	5–1	2–1	5–0	2–0	0–0	1–2	1–1	6–0	2–0	2–0	3–2	1–1	3–0	4–2	2–1
TuS Celle FC	3–1	1–4	4–1	—	1–0	0–2	1–0	2–0	2–1	2–3	4–2	1–6	0–1	1–3	1–2	2–2	3–0	2–1
SV Atlas Delmenhorst	4–2	3–2	4–2	0–1	—	0–1	3–3	4–0	0–3	1–2	4–2	2–2	0–0	3–1	2–4	1–2	0–1	2–0
Kickers Emden	1–1	1–3	3–2	4–1	2–1	—	1–1	2–2	2–2	0–1	1–1	0–0	2–0	0–1	2–1	3–0	2–2	0–0
SC Göttingen 05	1–1	0–0	0–2	2–1	1–1	3–0	—	1–1	5–2	2–3	2–0	1–0	0–2	0–0	0–0	2–1	1–0	0–2
Concordia Hamburg	4–0	0–1	1–1	0–0	5–1	0–2	1–1	—	0–1	0–5	1–3	1–1	2–2	0–0	1–0	0–0	4–2	2–0
Hamburger SV II	6–0	2–0	2–3	1–1	1–1	1–0	0–0	0–1	—	1–0	2–1	4–1	2–1	0–0	1–1	5–1	5–1	2–0
Hannover 96	4–0	4–0	1–0	2–0	2–0	4–0	0–0	9–1	7–0	—	3–3	5–0	3–1	3–0	1–1	4–0	5–1	6–0
VfL Herzlake	1–0	2–1	1–3	2–4	4–1	1–0	3–0	1–3	2–1	0–2	—	2–0	3–0	1–1	2–0	2–5	0–0	3–0
Lüneburger SK	2–0	0–2	0–2	0–3	1–0	2–1	1–1	3–1	0–2	0–2	0–2	—	2–3	1–1	0–2	0–0	2–0	0–1
SV Lurup Hamburg	1–1	0–2	1–3	2–4	1–3	1–0	1–2	4–2	2–3	0–5	0–2	2–2	—	0–4	2–2	1–1	0–2	0–1
1. SC Norderstedt	0–2	1–3	0–2	0–0	5–0	2–2	4–1	2–0	1–1	3–4	0–0	3–1	3–0	—	0–0	7–0	2–1	4–1
VfL Osnabrück	1–0	0–0	1–2	0–0	2–0	3–0	1–1	2–0	1–0	3–1	2–2	2–0	3–0	1–0	—	0–0	5–0	1–0
Sportfreunde Ricklingen	2–0	0–1	0–3	1–2	0–0	2–1	2–0	1–0	1–3	0–2	2–3	3–2	3–2	0–0	0–3	—	2–2	2–2
FC St. Pauli II	0–0	0–3	1–1	1–4	1–0	0–1	1–1	0–0	1–0	0–0	1–1	2–0	0–0	0–2	0–3	0–0	—	1–0
SV Wilhelmshaven	1–1	0–4	2–0	3–2	1–2	1–1	1–0	1–1	2–3	1–3	4–2	0–2	1–0	2–1	1–1	0–1	2–2	—

Updated to match(es) played on unknown. Source: Regionalliga Nord Spielplan 1996/1997
Legend: Blue = home team win; Yellow = draw; Red = away team win.

=== Top scorers ===
#	Player	Club	Goals
1.	(Turkey) Hakan Cengiz	VfL Herzlake	28
2.	(Federal Republic of Yugoslavia) Vladan Milovanović	Hannover 96	27
3.	(Croatia) Kreso Kovacec	Hannover 96	25
4.	(Federal Republic of Yugoslavia) Miloš Kolaković	Eintracht Braunschweig	19
5.	(Germany) Markus Burmeister	1. SC Norderstedt	14
6.	(Germany) Daniel Stendel	Hamburger SV (A)	16
7.	(Netherlands) Arie van Lent	Werder Bremen (A)	15
8.	(Germany) Stephan Prause	Kickers Emden	14
9.	(Germany) Uwe Harttgen	Werder Bremen (A)	13
9.	(Germany) Christian Jablonski	Atlas Delmenhorst	13
9.	(Bosnia and Herzegovina) Leo Marić	Eintracht Braunschweig	13
9.	(Germany) Tibor Nadj	Hamburger SV (A)	13

== North-East ==
=== Final table ===
Pos	Team	Pld	W	D	L	GF	GA	GD	Pts	Qualification or relegation
1	FC Energie Cottbus (C, P)	34	25	7	2	80	17	+63	82	Qualification to promotion play-off
2	FC Erzgebirge Aue	34	20	11	3	60	32	+28	71	
3	FC Rot-Weiß Erfurt	34	19	9	6	80	39	+41	66	
4	Chemnitzer FC	34	19	7	8	60	27	+33	64	
5	1. FC Union Berlin	34	19	5	10	51	37	+14	62	
6	Tennis Borussia Berlin	34	16	13	5	60	27	+33	61	
7	Dynamo Dresden	34	17	6	11	57	38	+19	57	
8	Eisenhüttenstädter FC Stahl	34	13	10	11	56	57	−1	49	
9	FC Sachsen Leipzig	34	13	7	14	61	52	+9	46	
10	VFC Plauen	34	10	14	10	44	50	−6	44	
11	FSV Lok Altmark Stendal	34	10	13	11	38	34	+4	43	
12	Wacker Nordhausen	34	9	9	16	41	62	−21	36	
13	FC Berlin	34	7	14	13	29	48	−19	35	
14	Reinickendorfer Füchse	34	8	8	18	32	42	−10	32	
15	Hertha Zehlendorf	34	4	15	15	26	52	−26	27	
16	Spandauer SV	34	6	7	21	33	72	−39	25	
17	SC Charlottenburg (R)	34	3	8	23	29	74	−45	17	Relegation to Oberliga
18	FSV Velten (R)	34	4	5	25	25	102	−77	17	Relegation to Oberliga

(C) Champions; (P) Promoted; (R) Relegated

=== Results ===
Home \ Away	ERZ	FCB	TBB	BER	CHA	CHE	ECO	DDR	EHS	RWE	FSL	WNO	PLA	RFÜ	SPA	LAS	VEL	HZE
Erzgebirge Aue	—	3–1	2–0	1–3	4–1	1–0	2–2	1–1	2–1	2–1	1–1	1–5	1–1	1–0	7–1	2–1	5–0	4–1
FC Berlin	0–1	—	1–1	0–6	1–1	0–1	0–0	2–0	2–2	0–2	0–3	1–1	3–1	0–3	3–1	0–0	1–1	2–0
Tennis Borussia Berlin	0–1	3–2	—	3–0	1–0	2–2	0–0	2–1	0–0	2–3	4–0	5–0	4–3	0–0	2–0	1–1	5–0	0–0
1. FC Union Berlin	0–1	0–0	0–0	—	2–1	1–0	0–4	0–0	2–0	0–2	4–2	3–1	0–2	1–0	3–1	0–0	2–1	2–0
SC Charlottenburg	1–2	0–0	1–2	0–2	—	0–2	1–4	0–2	0–2	0–7	1–1	4–0	1–1	1–2	1–1	1–1	2–0	1–0
Chemnitzer FC	2–2	2–0	0–3	2–1	5–0	—	1–3	1–0	2–0	2–0	4–0	3–0	0–0	1–0	6–0	1–0	4–0	4–0
FC Energie Cottbus	1–1	2–0	1–0	3–0	4–1	1–0	—	0–2	4–0	3–1	2–0	3–0	5–0	0–1	5–0	3–0	6–1	1–0
Dynamo Dresden	0–1	0–0	0–2	1–2	4–0	3–1	1–2	—	4–2	1–2	3–2	5–0	1–0	3–0	2–0	2–0	2–1	1–1
Eisenhüttenstädter FC Stahl	1–1	2–0	0–0	1–3	2–1	1–1	0–2	2–4	—	4–2	3–2	3–2	2–2	0–2	2–1	3–1	5–0	2–1
Rot-Weiß Erfurt	1–1	1–1	1–1	5–3	6–2	3–3	0–0	2–1	4–0	—	3–0	0–0	3–0	2–0	1–1	5–1	4–0	0–0
FC Sachsen Leipzig	0–1	0–1	3–4	1–0	3–1	0–1	1–2	5–1	2–2	0–3	—	4–1	2–2	3–1	3–1	1–1	2–0	2–2
Wacker Nordhausen	1–2	2–2	0–0	2–0	1–1	1–0	1–3	2–1	1–2	1–2	1–4	—	2–1	2–1	1–2	1–1	3–1	4–1
VFC Plauen	0–0	2–0	0–4	0–0	2–1	0–1	0–0	3–3	2–2	1–2	1–4	2–1	—	1–1	4–2	1–0	2–0	4–1
Reinickendorfer Füchse	0–2	0–1	1–2	1–2	0–0	1–1	1–4	0–1	1–1	1–3	1–0	1–1	1–1	—	0–1	2–1	1–2	0–1
Spandauer SV	2–0	2–2	0–0	1–2	4–3	1–1	1–3	1–2	1–2	2–1	0–2	1–1	0–1	0–2	—	0–1	1–2	1–1
FSV Lok Altmark Stendal	1–1	3–0	2–0	0–1	3–1	2–0	1–1	0–1	2–0	2–2	0–0	1–0	0–1	1–1	2–0	—	6–0	1–1
FSV Velten	1–2	1–2	0–5	0–4	2–0	0–2	0–5	0–3	2–6	4–3	0–6	0–1	2–2	1–6	1–2	1–1	—	1–1
Hertha Zehlendorf	1–1	1–1	2–2	1–2	1–0	1–4	0–1	1–1	1–1	0–3	0–2	1–1	1–1	1–0	3–1	0–1	0–0	—

Source: Regionalliga Nordost Spielplan 1996/1997
Legend: Blue = home team win; Yellow = draw; Red = away team win.

=== Top scorers ===
#	Player	Club	Goals
1.	(Germany) Marco Weißhaupt	Rot-Weiß Erfurt	21
2.	(Germany) Ilija Aračić	Chemnitzer FC	18
2.	(Germany) Daniel Bärwolf	Rot-Weiß Erfurt	18
4.	(Germany) Mike Sadlo	Erzgebirge Aue	17
5.	(Ukraine) Oleg Golowan	FC Sachsen Leipzig	14
6.	(Germany) Toralf Konetzke	Energie Cottbus	15
7.	(Germany) Ronny Hebestreit	Rot-Weiß Erfurt	14
8.	(Germany) Thomas Adler	Tennis Borussia Berlin	13
8.	(Germany) Detlef Irrgang	Energie Cottbus	13
8.	(Germany) Rainer Wiedemann	FSV Lok Altmark Stendal	13

== West/South-West ==
=== Final table ===
Pos	Team	Pld	W	D	L	GF	GA	GD	Pts	Promotion or relegation
1	SG Wattenscheid 09 (C, P)	34	23	8	3	78	35	+43	77	Promotion to 2. Bundesliga
2	Rot-Weiß Oberhausen	34	19	8	7	62	22	+40	65	
3	1. FC Saarbrücken	34	17	10	7	64	38	+26	61	
4	LR Ahlen	34	15	12	7	61	38	+23	57	
5	Preußen Münster	34	15	12	7	52	32	+20	57	
6	Wuppertaler SV	34	13	12	9	46	40	+6	51	
7	SC Verl	34	14	7	13	61	52	+9	49	
8	FC 08 Homburg	34	12	9	13	47	47	0	45	
9	Eintracht Trier	34	11	10	13	41	45	−4	43	
10	TuS Paderborn-Neuhaus	34	11	10	13	40	46	−6	43	
11	Alemannia Aachen	34	11	9	14	40	48	−8	42	
12	FC Germania Teveren	34	9	14	11	34	45	−11	41	
13	SpVgg Erkenschwick	34	10	10	14	46	55	−9	40	
14	FSV Salmrohr	34	10	9	15	39	54	−15	39	
15	FC Remscheid	34	8	13	13	30	42	−12	37	
16	SC Hauenstein (R)	34	8	12	14	46	62	−16	36	Relegation to Oberliga
17	1. FC Bocholt (R)	34	6	7	21	24	66	−42	25	Relegation to Oberliga
18	SV Elversberg (R)	34	4	8	22	34	78	−44	20	Relegation to Oberliga

(C) Champions; (P) Promoted; (R) Relegated

=== Results ===
Home \ Away	AAC	AHL	BOC	ELV	SVE	HAU	HOM	PMÜ	RWO	TPN	REM	SAA	SAL	TEV	ETR	VER	W09	WUP
Alemannia Aachen	—	1–2	1–0	7–0	1–2	2–0	3–2	1–0	0–0	3–1	0–0	1–1	2–1	2–1	1–1	0–3	1–5	1–0
LR Ahlen	1–1	—	2–1	3–0	2–0	1–0	0–0	1–1	2–0	1–1	2–1	1–3	0–0	5–1	2–2	1–2	2–2	2–0
1. FC Bocholt	1–0	0–4	—	3–1	0–3	0–0	1–1	0–5	0–3	0–1	0–2	3–0	0–0	1–1	1–2	0–2	0–7	0–1
SV Elversberg	2–0	1–1	3–0	—	2–2	3–3	1–3	1–3	0–4	0–2	2–2	1–1	2–5	1–1	1–1	3–0	2–4	1–2
SpVgg Erkenschwick	2–0	1–4	2–0	3–0	—	5–1	1–5	0–2	0–0	2–2	0–1	0–4	4–6	1–1	1–3	3–1	1–2	2–0
SC Hauenstein	4–2	2–2	3–1	0–1	1–1	—	4–2	2–2	1–0	1–3	2–3	1–4	0–0	2–2	2–1	0–0	0–2	2–4
FC 08 Homburg	4–3	2–1	2–3	1–0	1–1	0–2	—	2–0	0–2	3–0	0–0	1–1	1–2	0–1	1–0	1–1	0–0	1–3
Preußen Münster	0–0	3–2	1–0	1–0	0–1	1–1	1–0	—	0–0	3–2	0–0	4–2	0–0	1–1	3–0	0–0	0–2	2–0
Rot-Weiß Oberhausen	0–1	3–0	1–1	4–0	2–0	2–1	2–0	2–2	—	3–1	1–1	1–1	2–0	2–0	3–0	1–0	0–2	2–0
TuS Paderborn-Neuhaus	0–1	1–1	0–0	2–0	0–0	1–3	1–1	2–2	1–3	—	0–0	2–1	2–0	1–1	1–3	3–2	1–4	0–1
FC Remscheid	0–0	0–1	0–0	3–0	1–1	3–0	1–2	1–3	2–0	1–0	—	0–3	1–1	0–0	1–1	2–1	1–3	0–0
1. FC Saarbrücken	0–0	2–1	5–2	3–0	1–0	6–2	2–0	1–0	1–2	1–2	1–0	—	2–0	1–0	0–0	2–1	2–2	2–0
FSV Salmrohr	3–0	1–3	0–1	1–0	1–1	1–4	1–3	0–4	0–6	0–2	4–0	2–1	—	3–0	1–3	1–1	1–1	1–2
FC Germania Teveren	2–0	1–0	1–2	2–2	0–2	3–0	1–1	1–0	0–5	0–1	2–0	2–2	0–0	—	1–0	3–1	2–2	0–0
Eintracht Trier	2–0	0–4	1–0	2–1	1–1	2–0	1–4	1–3	1–1	0–1	4–0	3–3	0–2	0–1	—	1–0	2–0	1–1
SC Verl	4–2	3–3	5–2	3–1	4–0	0–0	4–0	0–2	0–3	2–2	2–1	1–3	5–0	2–0	2–1	—	3–4	1–0
SG Wattenscheid 09	3–2	0–2	3–1	3–2	3–1	2–2	0–2	4–1	1–0	1–0	2–1	2–1	1–0	3–0	2–1	5–0	—	0–0
Wuppertaler SV	1–1	2–2	3–0	3–0	3–2	0–0	3–1	2–2	3–2	2–1	4–1	1–1	0–1	2–2	0–0	2–5	1–1	—

Source: Regionalliga West Spielplan 1996/1997
Legend: Blue = home team win; Yellow = draw; Red = away team win.

=== Top scorers ===
#	Player	Club	Goals
1.	(Germany) René Deffke	LR Ahlen	24
1.	(Germany) Marcus Feinbier	Alemannia Aachen / SG Wattenscheid 09	24
3.	(Slovenia) Branko Zibert	1. FC Saarbrücken	23
4.	(Germany) Achim Weber	Wuppertaler SV / Rot-Weiß Oberhausen	18
5.	(Germany) Andreas Lässig	SC Hauenstein	14
5.	(Germany) Jürgen Serr	Preußen Münster	14
7.	(United States) Brent Goulet	Wuppertaler SV	13
7.	(Federal Republic of Yugoslavia) Ermin Melunović	Eintracht Trier	13
9.	(Poland) Markus Zuraski	SC Verl	12
10.	(Germany) Sergio Allievi	SG Wattenscheid 09	11
10.	(Poland) Marek Czakon	Eintracht Trier	11
10.	(Germany) Thomas Pröpper	Rot-Weiß Oberhausen	11
10.	(Albania) Astrit Ramadani	FSV Salmrohr	11
10.	(Germany) Ulf Raschke	SC Verl	11

== South ==
=== Final table ===
Pos	Team	Pld	W	D	L	GF	GA	GD	Pts	Promotion or relegation
1	1. FC Nürnberg (C, P)	34	25	5	4	75	26	+49	80	Promotion to 2. Bundesliga
2	SpVgg Greuther Fürth (P)	34	23	7	4	76	28	+48	76	Promotion to 2. Bundesliga
3	SSV Reutlingen	34	19	7	8	67	33	+34	64	
4	Borussia Fulda	34	16	7	11	58	37	+21	55	
5	Wacker Burghausen	34	16	7	11	50	37	+13	55	
6	SSV Ulm 1846	34	16	6	12	71	50	+21	54	
7	VfR Mannheim	34	16	6	12	66	54	+12	54	
8	Bayern Munich II	34	12	10	12	49	52	−3	46	
9	SC Neukirchen 1899	34	12	8	14	44	59	−15	44	
10	SC Weismain	34	10	10	14	53	64	−11	40	
11	FC Augsburg	34	9	11	14	46	50	−4	38	
12	KSV Hessen Kassel	34	10	7	17	43	65	−22	37	
13	SV Darmstadt 98	34	9	9	16	49	61	−12	36	
14	Karlsruher SC II	34	9	9	16	38	57	−19	36	
15	TSF Ditzingen	34	10	6	18	53	74	−21	36	
16	SpVgg 07 Ludwigsburg (R)	34	9	7	18	40	66	−26	34	Relegation to Oberliga
17	SG Quelle Fürth (R)	34	8	9	17	38	68	−30	33	Relegation to Oberliga
18	SG Egelsbach (R)	34	7	9	18	44	79	−35	30	Relegation to Oberliga

(C) Champions; (P) Promoted; (R) Relegated

=== Results ===
Home \ Away	AUG	WBU	D98	DIT	EGE	SGF	SQF	FUL	KAR	KAS	LUD	MAN	BMA	NEU	NÜR	REU	ULM	WEI
FC Augsburg	—	0–0	0–0	1–1	3–0	0–2	1–1	0–0	4–0	1–1	4–0	2–1	1–1	1–2	0–2	0–2	2–0	2–2
Wacker Burghausen	3–1	—	1–1	3–2	2–1	5–0	1–2	1–2	3–0	2–0	0–1	3–0	3–0	1–0	2–0	0–0	1–0	1–1
SV Darmstadt 98	2–3	2–3	—	2–2	4–0	2–5	3–2	1–3	0–2	2–1	0–2	2–0	1–2	2–2	2–3	0–2	2–1	2–0
TSF Ditzingen	2–2	1–1	3–2	—	2–3	0–3	4–1	1–2	2–1	2–2	3–0	3–0	1–0	2–1	0–2	3–5	4–2	1–0
SG Egelsbach	2–5	2–3	2–1	3–1	—	2–2	1–2	0–0	1–1	3–5	4–0	1–5	3–2	1–4	1–5	1–1	0–3	1–0
SpVgg Greuther Fürth	1–0	1–0	0–0	5–0	3–0	—	3–1	2–1	3–0	4–0	2–0	4–2	5–1	4–1	3–1	1–2	2–0	0–0
SG Quelle Fürth	1–0	0–4	0–1	2–0	1–1	1–4	—	0–3	0–3	0–1	3–2	1–0	0–4	5–2	0–1	1–0	2–2	2–2
Borussia Fulda	1–4	5–0	3–0	1–2	2–0	0–1	1–1	—	2–0	3–1	3–0	4–1	2–2	5–0	1–1	0–3	3–0	3–2
Karlsruher SC II	0–1	1–0	0–0	3–1	1–1	0–0	4–1	2–1	—	3–0	2–3	2–2	1–1	0–0	0–1	1–1	0–1	3–2
KSV Hessen Kassel	1–0	2–0	1–2	3–1	3–0	1–4	1–1	1–1	4–1	—	2–0	1–2	3–1	0–3	0–2	1–3	2–1	0–0
SpVgg 07 Ludwigsburg	3–1	0–1	0–0	4–1	1–4	1–1	2–2	0–2	3–0	1–1	—	0–2	1–2	3–1	0–3	0–4	2–2	2–1
VfR Mannheim	0–0	0–0	4–3	2–1	2–2	1–3	5–0	2–0	4–1	4–1	3–2	—	2–1	1–1	2–2	1–0	0–1	6–2
Bayern Munich II	2–2	2–0	2–2	2–0	1–0	2–1	2–2	2–1	1–3	3–0	3–1	2–3	—	0–2	2–2	0–3	1–0	2–0
SC Neukirchen 1899	3–2	0–3	0–5	4–1	0–0	0–3	0–0	2–0	3–1	1–0	3–3	0–1	1–1	—	1–0	2–1	0–4	1–2
1. FC Nürnberg	2–1	4–0	2–2	1–1	4–0	1–0	2–1	1–0	5–0	4–0	2–0	2–0	3–0	1–0	—	3–1	4–1	4–1
SSV Reutlingen	5–1	1–0	2–1	5–3	1–1	0–1	3–1	0–1	2–0	2–2	3–0	1–0	0–0	1–2	2–0	—	1–2	4–2
SSV Ulm 1846	5–1	4–2	4–0	2–1	5–0	2–2	3–0	2–2	1–1	5–0	1–3	4–3	1–0	4–1	2–3	1–1	—	4–0
SC Weismain	2–0	1–1	4–1	4–0	4–3	1–1	2–1	2–0	3–1	3–2	0–0	2–5	2–2	1–1	0–2	1–5	4–1	—

Source: Regionalliga Süd Spielplan 1996/1997
Legend: Blue = home team win; Yellow = draw; Red = away team win.

=== Top scorers ===
#	Player	Club	Goals
1.	(Germany) Frank Türr	SpVgg Greuther Fürth	25
2.	(Cameroon) Olivier Djappa	Borussia Fulda	24
2.	(Germany) Michael Mayer	SSV Reutlingen	24
4.	(Germany) Carsten Lakies	Bayern Munich (A)	22
4.	(Federal Republic of Yugoslavia) Dragan Trkulja	SSV Ulm 1846	22
6.	(Germany) Sascha Licht	SC Weismain	20
6.	(Germany) Heiko Liebers	SC Neukirchen	20
8.	(Germany) Markus Kurth	1. FC Nürnberg	16
9.	(Germany) Marco Flading	Borussia Fulda	14
10.	(Germany) Marcus Volke	SV Darmstadt 98	13

== Promotion playoff ==
The last promotion place was contested between the champions of the North and North-East regions.

First leg

29 May 1997
20:20

Hannover 96	0 – 0	Energie Cottbus

Niedersachsenstadion (Hannover)
Attendance: 54,600
Referee: Hans-Jürgen Weber

Second leg

5 June 1997
20:20

Energie Cottbus	3 – 1	Hannover 96
Hoßmang 38'; Irrgang 72', 86'		Ernst 32'

Stadion der Freundschaft (Cottbus)
Attendance: 22,000
Referee: Georg Dardenne

Energie Cottbus won 3–1 on aggregate and so were promoted to the 2. Bundesliga.
