= Frank Seifert =

German former footballer (born 1972)

Personal information
- Date of birth: 2 October 1972 (age 54)
- Place of birth: Dresden, East Germany
- Positions: Midfielder; forward

Youth career
- –1986: SC Einheit Dresden
- 1986–1990: SG Dynamo Dresden

Senior career*
Years	Team	Apps	(Gls)
1990–1992	VfB Stuttgart (A)	22	(5)
1992–1995	Chemnitzer FC		
1995–1998	FC Energie Cottbus	70	(18)
1998–2000	VfB Leipzig	59	(8)
2000–2002	Rot-Weiß Erfurt	52	(6)
2002–2003	Dresdner SC	11	(2)
2003–2006	SG Blau-Gelb Lausdorf		
2006–2008	FV Dresden 06		
2008–2009	SC Borea Dresden	21	(4)

International career
- East Germany Youth
Medal record
Energie Cottbus
Runner-up	DFB-Pokal	1997
- * Club domestic league appearances and goals

Frank Seifert (born 2 October 1972) is a German former footballer.

== Career ==
A midfielder or forward, Seifert played youth football for Einheit and later Dynamo Dresden, also representing East Germany at youth level. After reunification, he moved to VfB Stuttgart, where he played in the reserve team for two years. He then spent three years at both Chemnitzer FC and Energie Cottbus, playing a season in the 2. Bundesliga for both clubs. At Cottbus he also played in the 1997 DFB-Pokal Final.

His last season at Cottbus was marred by injury, and he moved in 1998, joining VfB Leipzig. Two years in Leipzig were followed by spells with Rot-Weiß Erfurt and Dresdner SC, before he dropped down into local football, playing for Brandenburg side SG Blau-Gelb Laubsdorf from 2003 to 2006.

In 2006, Seifert returned to Dresden, and returned to senior football, joining FV Dresden 06. Two years later he moved across town to SC Borea, before retiring from the game in 2009.
