= Günter Pröpper =

German footballer

Personal information
- Date of birth: 8 December 1941 (age 84)
- Place of birth: Dorsten, Germany
- Height: 1.78 m (5 ft 10 in)
- Position: Forward

Senior career*
Years	Team	Apps	(Gls)
- BVH Dorsten
1964–1967	VfL Osnabrück	71	(40)
1967–1969	Rot-Weiss Essen		
1969–1979	Wuppertaler SV (Note: Wuppertaler SV infobox statistics are for appearances and goals in the Bundesliga and 2. Bundesliga North only. They exclude appearances and goals from 1969 to 1972 in the Regionalliga West.)	194	(74)
- * Club domestic league appearances and goals

Günter Pröpper (born 8 December 1941) is a German retired professional footballer who played as a forward. Born in Dorsten, Pröpper started his career in amateur football before joining VfL Osnabrück in 1964. He spent three seasons with the club, moving on to Rot-Weiss Essen in 1967. Two years later he joined Wuppertaler SV, where he played for the remainder of his career.

A prolific goalscorer, Pröpper set the German record for most goals in a season in 1971–72, scoring 52 goals in 34 league games. By the end of his career, he had scored 258 goals, the joint-eighth highest total in German football history.

== Career ==
Pröpper was born on 8 December 1941 in Dorsten, a town in the North Rhine-Westphalia region of Germany. He began his career playing amateur football in his home town for BVH Dorsten, a team which two of his brothers, Heinz and Erich, also played for, and helped the club achieve promotion to the Verbandsliga, the highest level of amateur football at the time. After an impressive first season in the Verbandsliga, with the club finishing in fifth place, a number of players had attracted the attention of bigger clubs, and in 1964, Pröpper joined Regionalliga side VfL Osnabrück. He spent three years at the club, and was top scorer in the 1966–67 season of the Regionalliga Nord with 25 goals. He subsequently joined Rot-Weiss Essen in 1967.

After a good first season with Essen, Pröpper was dropped to the bench during the following season by new coach Kuno Klötzer. Despite being the club's second highest scorer in the 1968–69 season, Pröpper was not a regular in the side, and was sold to Wuppertaler SV for DM 30,000 in 1969. Pröpper's most successful season came in 1971–72. In the third game of the season, he scored five goals in a game against SpVgg Erkenschwick, and in October 1971, Wuppertal had an away match against Pröpper's former club Rot-Weiss Essen. He went on to score four times in an eventual 5–0 win, and received a standing ovation from both sets of supporters as he was substituted. By the end of the season, Pröpper had scored a total of 52 goals in 34 league games – a record in German professional football for most goals in one season, and a further eight goals in the Aufstiegsrunde as Wuppertal won promotion to the Bundesliga.

Pröpper scored 21 goals in his first Bundesliga season, helping the club finish in fourth place and qualify for the UEFA Cup. He continued to score regularly in the following season as Wuppertal struggled in the league, but scored only two goals in the 1974–75 season as the club finished in last place and were relegated to the 2. Bundesliga North. Despite reported interest from other Bundesliga clubs, Pröpper remained at Wuppertal for the rest of his playing career until his retirement in 1979. He scored 170 goals during his ten years at Wuppertal, taking his career total to 258, making him the eighth highest top scorer of all-time in German football.

== Personal life ==
Pröpper was born as one of eight children. His father died during the Second World War when Pröpper was still very young. At the age of 14, he began an apprenticeship as a miner, and later trained to become a welder. Pröpper's son, Carsten, and his nephews, Michael and Thomas, are also former footballers.
