= Sven Benken =

German footballer (born 1970)

Personal information
- Date of birth: 20 April 1970 (age 56)
- Place of birth: Lauchhammer, East Germany
- Height: 1.82 m (6 ft 0 in)
- Position: Midfielder

Senior career*
Years	Team	Apps	(Gls)
1990–1994	FSV Glückauf Brieske-Senftenberg		
1994–1997	Energie Cottbus	93	(19)
1997–1999	Werder Bremen	29	(0)
1999–2002	Hansa Rostock	56	(2)
2003–2004	Dresdner SC	23	(2)
2004–2008	Blau-Gelb Laubsdorf		

Managerial career
- 2013–2014: Energie Cottbus U-14
- 2014–: SG Burg
- * Club domestic league appearances and goals

Sven Benken (born 20 April 1970) is a German former professional footballer who worked as a manager for SG Burg. He spent five seasons in the Bundesliga with Werder Bremen and Hansa Rostock.

== Honours ==
Energie Cottbus

- DFB-Pokal: runner-up 1996–97

Werder Bremen

- DFB-Pokal: 1998–99
- DFB-Ligapokal: runner-up 1999
- UEFA Intertoto Cup: 1998
