= Dubravko Kolinger =

German footballer

Personal information
- Date of birth: 29 November 1975 (age 50)
- Place of birth: Rastatt, West Germany
- Height: 1.88 m (6 ft 2 in)
- Position: Defender

Senior career*
Years	Team	Apps	(Gls)
1996–1998	Karlsruher SC	7	(0)
1998–2000	Kickers Offenbach		
2000–2003	FC St. Pauli	43	(2)
2003–2004	1. FC Schweinfurt 05	31	(7)
2004–2005	Jahn Regensburg	30	(8)
2005–2006	TuS Koblenz	21	(3)
2006–2007	SV Elversberg	28	(8)
2007–2009	VfB Stuttgart II	47	(5)
2010–2012	FC Nöttingen		
- * Club domestic league appearances and goals

Dubravko Kolinger (born 29 November 1975) is a German former professional footballer who played as a defender.

== Career ==
He joined VfB Stuttgart II in the summer of 2007 from SV Elversberg.
