= Carsten Pröpper =

German footballer

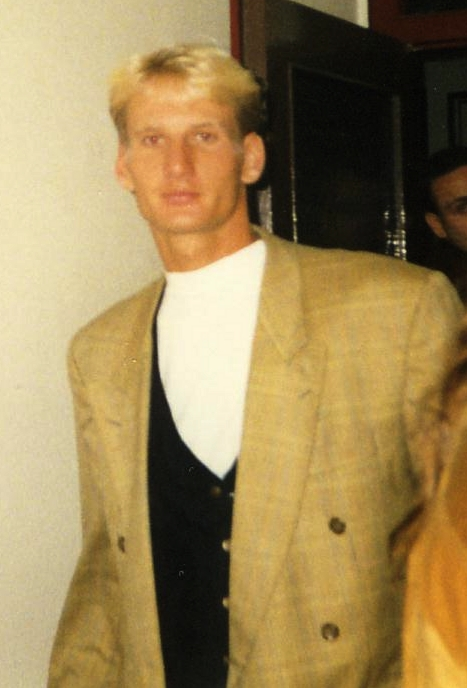
- Pröpper in the 1992–93 season

Personal information
- Date of birth: 20 October 1967 (age 59)
- Place of birth: Remscheid, Germany
- Height: 1.80 m (5 ft 11 in)
- Position: Midfielder

Senior career*
Years	Team	Apps	(Gls)
1986–1988	Wuppertaler SV		
1988–1990	BVL 08 Remscheid		
1990–1993	FC Remscheid		
1993–1998	FC St. Pauli	154	(16)
1998–2000	Rot-Weiß Oberhausen	45	(7)
- * Club domestic league appearances and goals

Carsten Pröpper (born 20 October 1967) is a German former professional footballer who played as a midfielder. He is a son of Günter Pröpper and first cousin of Michael and Thomas Pröpper, all footballers as well.
