= Ronny Hebestreit =

German footballer (born 1975)

Personal information
- Date of birth: 9 January 1975 (age 51)
- Place of birth: Gotha, East Germany
- Height: 1.87 m (6 ft 2 in)
- Positions: Forward; midfielder

Team information
- Current team: Rot-Weiß Erfurt (assistant)

Youth career
- 1982–1987: ESV Lok Erfurt
- 1987–1992: Rot-Weiß Erfurt

Senior career*
Years	Team	Apps	(Gls)
1992–1998	Rot-Weiß Erfurt	136	(60)
1993–1994	→ SSV Erfurt-Nord (loan)		
1998–2000	Bayern Munich (A)	35	(4)
2000–2007	Rot-Weiß Erfurt	193	(53)
2007–2008	ZFC Meuselwitz	21	(6)
2008–2011	Hallescher FC	73	(6)

Managerial career
- 2015: FC Rot-Weiß Erfurt II (assistant)
- 2015–2018: Rot-Weiß Erfurt (assistant)
- * Club domestic league appearances and goals

Ronny Hebestreit (born 9 January 1975) is a German football coach and former player.

Hebestreit was born in Gotha. He scored 113 goals in 329 appearances for Rot-Weiß Erfurt, over two spells, making him the club's second top goalscorer of all time, behind Jürgen Heun. He has also played for Hallescher FC, ZFC Meuselwitz and Bayern Munich II.
