= Stephan Lämmermann =

German footballer

Personal information
- Date of birth: 10 July 1967 (age 59)
- Place of birth: Cologne, West Germany
- Height: 1.71 m (5 ft 7 in)
- Position: Forward

Senior career*
Years	Team	Apps	(Gls)
1988?–1989	SpVgg Frechen		
1989–1994	SC Brück		
1994–2003	Alemannia Aachen	161	(31)
2003–2006	Borussia Freialdenhoven		
- * Club domestic league appearances and goals

Stephan Lämmermann (born 10 July 1967) is a German former professional footballer who played as a forward.
