= Guido Silberbach =

German footballer (1967–2025)

Personal information
- Date of birth: 24 May 1967
- Place of birth: Wanne-Eickel, North Rhine-Westphalia, West Germany
- Date of death: 14 November 2025 (aged 58)
- Height: 1.78 m (5 ft 10 in)
- Position: Forward

Senior career*
Years	Team	Apps	(Gls)
1987	BW Weitmar		
1990–1991	SC Westfalia Herne		
1991–1992	FSV Gevelsberg	28	(3)
1992–2004	SG Wattenscheid 09 II		
1992–2004	SG Wattenscheid 09		
1996–1997	→ FC Remscheid (loan)	17	(1)
2005–2007	SV Vorwärts Kornharpen		
- * Club domestic league appearances and goals

Guido Silberbach (24 May 1967 – 14 November 2025) was a German professional footballer who played as a forward.

== Career ==
Born in Wanne-Eickel, Silberbach played for SV Westfalia Weitmar 09, SC Westfalia Herne, FSV Gevelsberg, SG Wattenscheid 09, FC Remscheid and SV Vorwärts Kornharpen.

== Death ==
Silberbach died on 14 November 2025, at the age of 58.
