= Martin Spanring =

German footballer

Personal information
- Date of birth: 14 October 1969 (age 57)
- Place of birth: Munich, West Germany
- Height: 1.88 m (6 ft 2 in)
- Position: Defender

Youth career
- 1860 Munich

Senior career*
Years	Team	Apps	(Gls)
1988–1989	1860 Munich		
1990–1992	Fortuna Düsseldorf	49	(3)
1992–1993	Schalke 04	8	(0)
1993–1997	SC Freiburg	92	(7)
1997–2001	VfB Stuttgart	23	(0)
2001–2002	Bursaspor	4	(0)
2002–2003	Freiburger FC		
- * Club domestic league appearances and goals

Martin Spanring (born 14 October 1969) is a German former professional footballer who played as a defender. He had a brief stint in the Turkish Super League with Bursaspor.

== Honours ==
- UEFA Cup Winners' Cup: runner-up 1997–98
