= Markus Lotter =

German footballer and manager

Personal information
- Date of birth: 28 September 1970 (age 56)
- Place of birth: Amberg, West Germany
- Height: 1.86 m (6 ft 1 in)
- Position: Midfielder

Youth career
- DJK Ensdorf
- FC Amberg
- Jahn Regensburg

Senior career*
Years	Team	Apps	(Gls)
–1998	Greuther Fürth	26	(0)
1998–2003	FC St. Pauli	89	(8)
2003–2004	Köpenicker SC		

Managerial career
- 2003: FC St. Pauli (assistant)
- * Club domestic league appearances and goals

Markus Lotter (born 28 September 1970) is a German football coach and a former player. He spent one season in the Bundesliga with FC St. Pauli.

At the moment, he lives in Berlin and works as a journalist.
