= Matthias Zimmerling =

German footballer (born 1967)

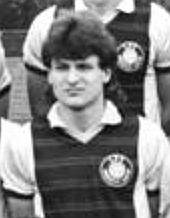
- Zimmerling in 1988

Personal information
- Date of birth: 6 September 1967 (age 59)
- Place of birth: East Germany
- Position: Striker

Team information
- Current team: Innsbrucker AC (Manager)

Youth career
- 1979–1986: Lokomotive Leipzig

Senior career*
Years	Team	Apps	(Gls)
1986–1989	Lokomotive Leipzig	28	(3)
1987	→ Chemie Leipzig (loan)	5	(2)
1989–1990	Hannover 96	7	(1)
1990	Sachsen Leipzig	1	(0)
1990–1991	FC Berlin	5	(0)
1991–1994	Union Berlin	75	(33)
1994–1995	Energie Cottbus	24	(14)
1995–1996	Carl Zeiss Jena	15	(3)
1996–1997	Energie Cottbus	26	(6)
1997–1998	Union Berlin	7	(0)
1998–1999	Austria Klagenfurt	13	(1)
1999–2000	Sachsen Leipzig	23	(9)
2000–2001	VfL Halle 96	15	(3)
2001–2003	SAK Klagenfurt		
2003–2004	Annabichler SV Klagenfurt		
2004–2005	KAC Klagenfurt		
2005	ASKÖ Wölfnitz		

International career
- East Germany Youth

Managerial career
- 2006–2007: SAK Klagenfurt
- 2008–2009: SV Dellach/Gail
- 2009: FSV Zwickau
- 2010–2011: FC Kempten
- 2012–2013: Union Innsbruck
- 2013: FC Wacker (individualtrainer)
- 2013–2014: SV Wals-Grünau
- 2015–: Innsbrucker AC
Medal record
East Germany
Third place	FIFA World Youth Championship	1987
Energie Cottbus
Runner-up	DFB-Pokal	1997
- * Club domestic league appearances and goals

Matthias Zimmerling (born 6 September 1967) is a German former football manager and former player who manages Innsbrucker AC.

== Playing career ==
Zimmerling, who played as a striker, began his career in the late 1980s, playing for Lokomotive and Chemie Leipzig in the DDR-Oberliga. He represented East Germany at youth level, and was part of the squad that finished third at the 1987 FIFA World Youth Championship.

After Fall of the Berlin Wall, Zimmerling moved west, joining Hannover 96 during the 1989–90 season. However, he failed to establish himself in the first team, and returned to Leipzig, briefly rejoining FC Chemie (now renamed FC Sachsen). He played out the 1990s with a succession of clubs in the former DDR, playing for FC Berlin, Union Berlin (two spells), Energie Cottbus (two spells), Carl Zeiss Jena, Sachsen Leipzig for a third time, and VfL Halle 96. While at Cottbus he played in the 1997 DFB-Pokal Final. Later in his career he moved to Austria, playing for Austria Klagenfurt followed by spells at a number of smaller local clubs.

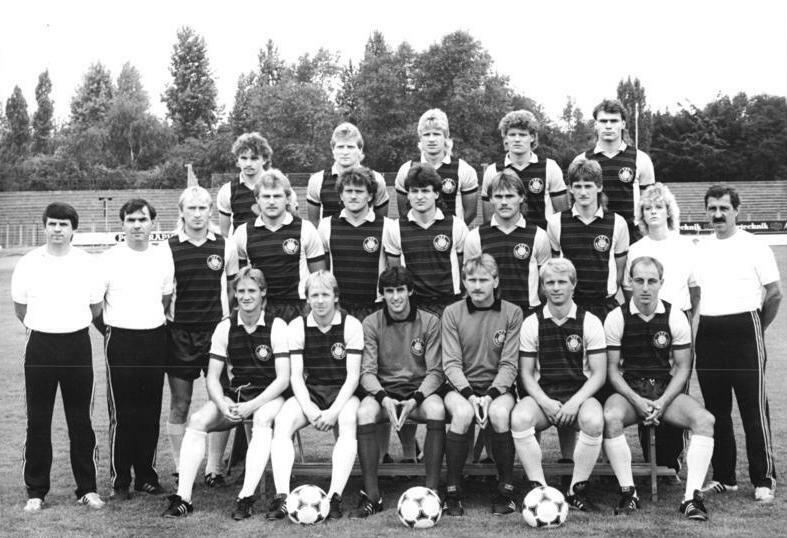
Zimmerling (central) in the 1988 squad photo of Lokomotive Leipzig

== Coaching career ==
After retirement, Zimmerling stayed in Klagenfurt, managing SAK Klagenfurt. He returned to German football in April 2009, when he was appointed manager of FSV Zwickau.
