= Michael Hofmann (footballer, born 1972) =

German footballer, coach, and manager

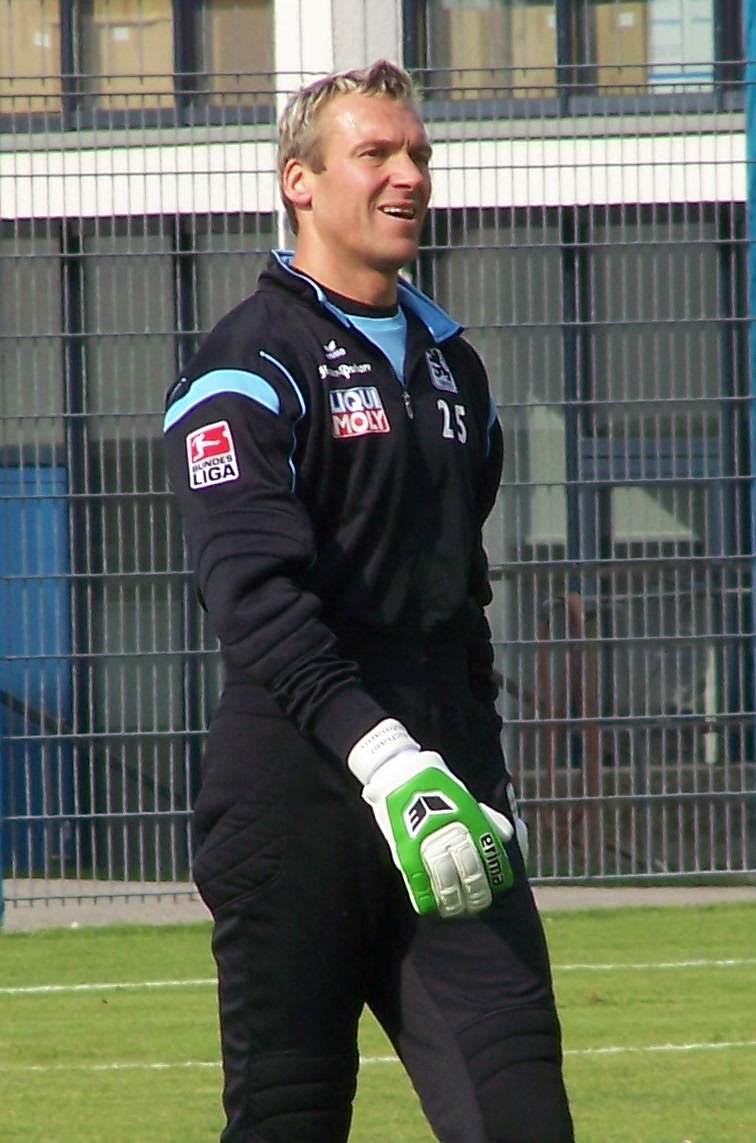
- Hofmann training with 1860 Munich in 2009

Personal information
- Full name: Michael Hofmann
- Date of birth: 3 November 1972 (age 53)
- Place of birth: Bayreuth, West Germany
- Height: 1.93 m (6 ft 4 in)
- Position: Goalkeeper

Team information
- Current team: Türkgücü München (goalkeeper coach)

Youth career
- –1990: SV Mistelgau

Senior career*
| Years | Team | Apps | (Gls) |
| 1990–1996 | SpVgg Bayreuth | 139 | (0) |
| 1996–2009 | 1860 Munich II | 68 | (0) |
| 1998–2010 | 1860 Munich | 162 | (0) |
| 2010–2013 | Jahn Regensburg | 87 | (0) |
| 2015 | SpVgg Bayreuth | 0 | (0) |
| 2015–2017 | SV Pullach | 57 | (0) |
| 2017–2018 | Türkgücü München | 4 | (0) |
| Total | | 517 | (0) |

Managerial career
- 2012–2013: Jahn Regensburg (goalkeeper coach)
- 2014–2015: Kirchheimer SC
- 2017–: Türkgücü München (goalkeeper coach)
- * Club domestic league appearances and goals

Michael Hofmann (born 3 November 1972) is a Germany football manager and former football player, who is goalkeeper coach of Türkgücü München.

Throughout his career, he played for SpVgg Bayreuth and 1860 Munich. He also spent time at SSV Jahn Regensburg as a player and coach.

== Playing career ==
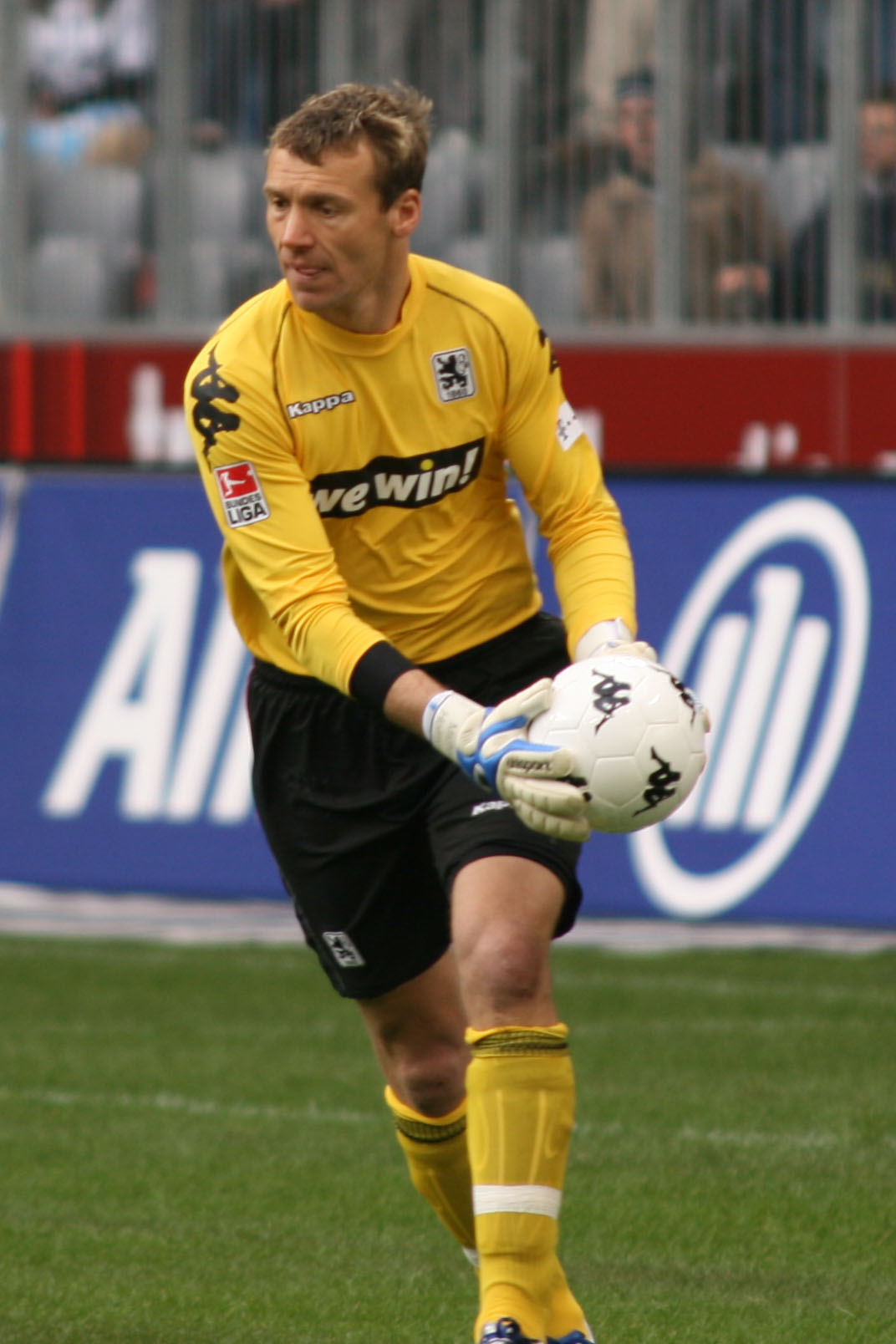
Hofmann playing for 1860 Munich in January 2007

After his contract at TSV 1860 München was not renewed Hofmann joined 3. Liga club SSV Jahn Regensburg.

== Managerial career ==
On 11 June 2014, Hofmann was named as the new manager of Kirchheimer SC.
