= Cătălin Răcănel =

Romanian footballer and manager

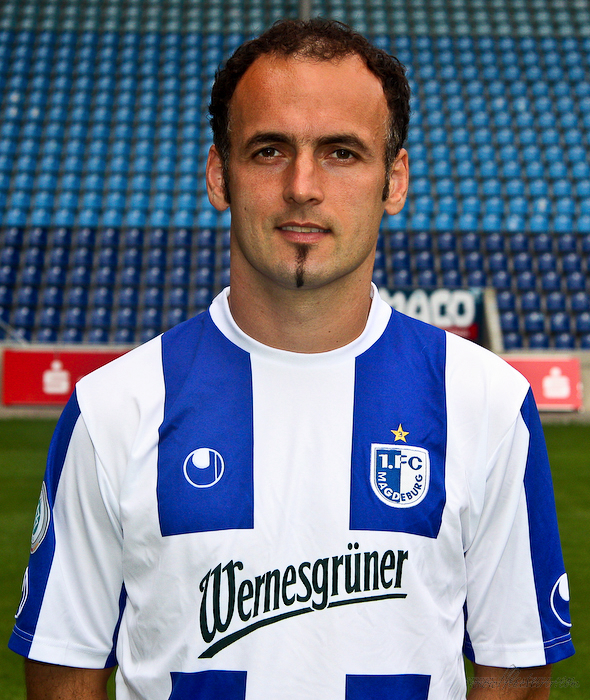
- Răcănel in 2010

Personal information
- Full name: Cătălin Răcănel
- Date of birth: 23 September 1976 (age 50)
- Place of birth: Bucharest, Romania
- Height: 1.78 m (5 ft 10 in)
- Position: Midfielder

Youth career
- –1990: Viitorul București
- SG Erbach
- FC Homburg

Senior career*
Years	Team	Apps	(Gls)
1994–1998	Borussia Neunkirchen	33	(1)
1998–1999	SV Elversberg	29	(2)
1999–2001	Eintracht Trier	69	(7)
2001–2003	FC St. Pauli	14	(0)
2003–2005	Eintracht Trier	65	(13)
2005–2006	Rot Weiss Ahlen	28	(1)
2006–2008	Sachsen Leipzig	40	(5)
2008–2010	1. FC Magdeburg	60	(5)
2011–2012	Borussia Neunkirchen	17	(0)
Total		355	(34)

Managerial career
- 2012: Borussia Neunkirchen (assistant)
- 2012: Borussia Neunkirchen
- * Club domestic league appearances and goals

Cătălin Răcănel (born 23 September 1976) is a Romanian former professional footballer and manager.

== Career ==
Born in Bucharest, Romania, Răcănel grew up in Germany and played for the youth teams of SG Erbach and FC Homburg. His first senior club station was Regionalliga side Borussia Neunkirchen. In 1998, Răcănel left for SV Elversberg in the same league. He played in 29 matches for the club and scored two goals. After only one year in Elversberg, he left for SV Eintracht Trier 05 who also played in Regionalliga West/Südwest. At the start of the 2001–02 season, Răcănel signed for newly promoted Bundesliga side FC St. Pauli. However, following an injury, he played only seven Bundesliga matches. In his second year at St. Pauli, he played another seven matches in the 2. Bundesliga. At the end of the season he returned to Eintracht Trier, playing in 65 matches over the next two seasons. After Trier's relegation from 2. Bundesliga, Răcănel moved to LR Ahlen where he also was a regular starter, but left the club after they were relegated from 2nd Bundesliga as well. Răcănel signed for fourth-tier side Sachsen Leipzig in the NOFV-Oberliga. In 40 matches for Leipzig Răcănel scored five goals. In June 2008, Răcănel signed for Regionalliga Nord side 1. FC Magdeburg.
