= Danilo Kunze =

German footballer

Personal information
- Date of birth: 29 June 1971 (age 55)
- Place of birth: East Germany
- Height: 1.85 m (6 ft 1 in)
- Position: Forward

Senior career*
Years	Team	Apps	(Gls)
1990–1992	Motor-Karl-Marx-Stadt		
1992–1994	Chemnitzer FC		
1994–1996	FC Erzgebirge Aue		
1996–1997	FSV Zwickau		
1997–2000	Chemnitzer FC		
2001	VfB Chemnitz		
2001–2004	VfB Auerbach		
2005–2009	Rapid Chemnitz		
- * Club domestic league appearances and goals

Danilo Kunze (born 29 June 1971) is a retired German football striker.
