= Christian Brand =

German footballer (born 1972)

Personal information
- Date of birth: 23 May 1972 (age 54)
- Place of birth: Quakenbrück, West Germany
- Height: 1.75 m (5 ft 9 in)
- Position: Midfielder

Team information
- Current team: Werder Bremen II (manager)

Youth career
- BV Quakenbrück
- VfL Herzlake

Senior career*
Years	Team	Apps	(Gls)
1991–1993	VfB Oldenburg	35	(2)
1993–1994	VfL Osnabrück		
1994–1995	FC Bremerhaven	20	(6)
1995–1996	Werder Bremen II	8	(0)
1996–1999	Werder Bremen	59	(4)
1999	VfL Wolfsburg	1	(0)
1999–2002	Hansa Rostock	48	(5)
2002–2004	FC Luzern	46	(18)
2004–2006	SC Kriens	46	(13)

Managerial career
- 2007–2008: Thun (assistant)
- 2008–2012: FC Luzern (youth)
- 2011: FC Luzern (caretaker)
- 2012–2014: FC Luzern II
- 2014–2015: Jahn Regensburg
- 2015–2017: Hansa Rostock
- 2018–2023: Werder Bremen (youth)
- 2023–: Werder Bremen II
- * Club domestic league appearances and goals

Christian Brand (born 23 May 1972) is a German football coach and former player who coaches Werder Bremen II.

== Playing career ==
A midfielder, Brand began his career at VfB Oldenburg and made his debut for the club on 27 August 1991 in a match against FC St. Pauli. In his first season Brand played 13 games as Oldenburg narrowly missed out on promotion, finishing in second place behind Bayer Uerdingen.

== Coaching career ==
After retiring from football, Brand became the new assistant manager of FC Thun in the summer 2007. On 7 January 2008, he was appointed as a youth coach of the FC Luzern. After the former coach Rolf Fringer was sacked on 2 May 2011, he was named caretaker manager of the Luzern first team and will be replaced by Murat Yakin at the end of the season.

He was appointed as the head coach of Jahn Regensburg on 18 November 2014.

He was appointed as the head coach of Hansa Rostock on 7 December 2015. He was sacked on 13 May 2017.

== Honours ==
Werder Bremen

- DFB-Pokal: 1998–99
