= Michél Mazingu-Dinzey =

German-born Congolese footballer (born 1972)

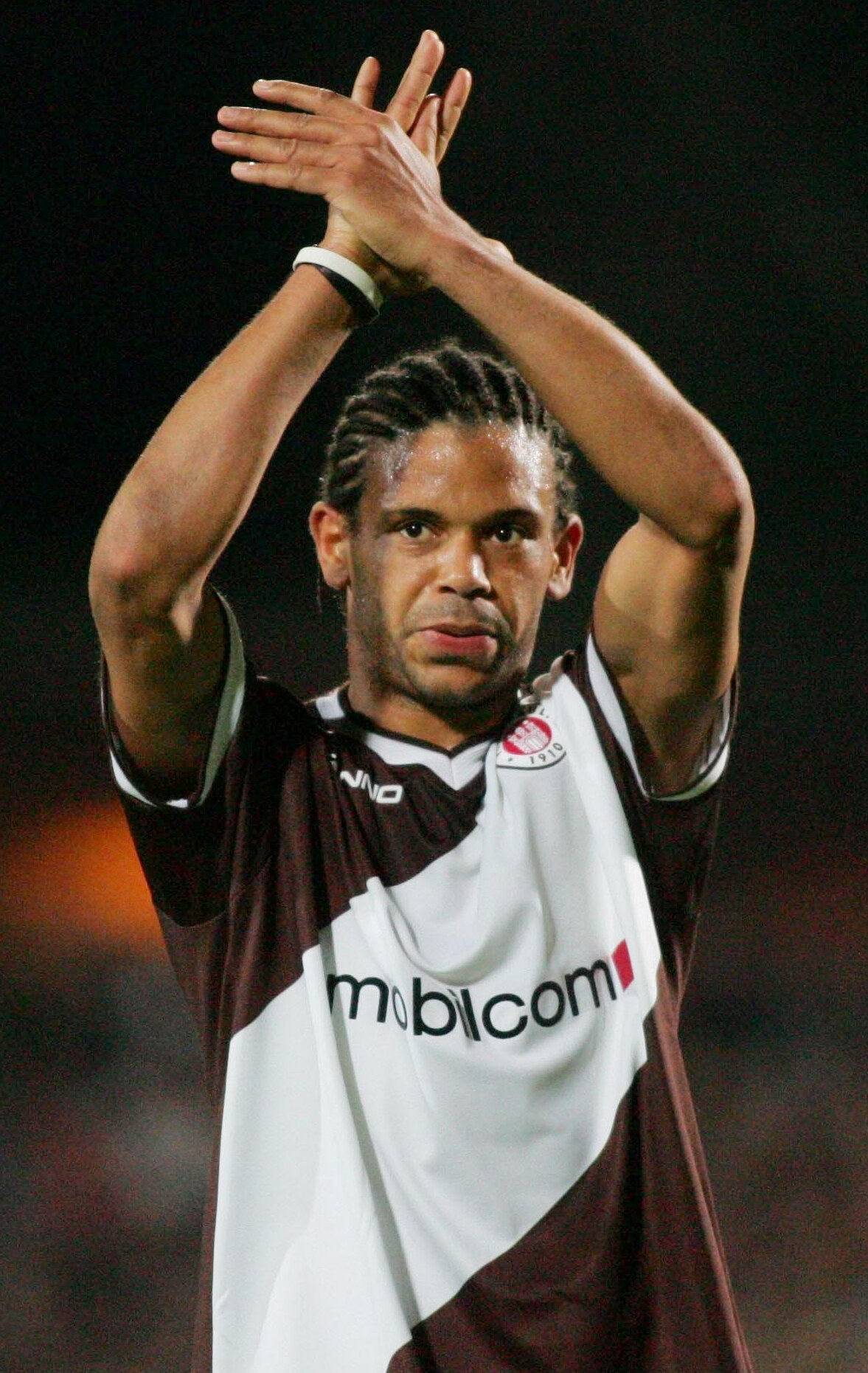
- Dinzey in the colours of FC St. Pauli.

Personal information
- Full name: Michél Sinda Mazingu-Dinzey
- Date of birth: 15 October 1975 (age 51)
- Place of birth: West Berlin, West Germany
- Height: 1.80 m (5 ft 11 in)
- Position: Midfielder

Youth career
- 1979–1986: Spvgg. Schöneberg
- 1986–1990: 1. FC Schöneberg
- 1990–1991: FV Wannsee

Senior career*
Years	Team	Apps	(Gls)
1991–1992	FV Wannsee	34	(7)
1992–1994	Lichterfelder FC	68	(17)
1994–1995	VfB Stuttgart	14	(0)
1995–1996	FC St. Pauli	31	(5)
1996–1998	Hertha BSC	60	(6)
1998–2000	1860 Munich	15	(1)
2000–2002	Hannover 96	13	(2)
2001	→ Vålerenga (loan)	10	(1)
2002–2004	Eintracht Braunschweig	66	(14)
2004–2007	FC St. Pauli	88	(24)
2007–2008	Holstein Kiel	10	(1)
2011–2012	TSV Apensen	2	(0)
Total		411	(78)

International career
1996–2004	DR Congo	33	(3)

Managerial career
- 2009: Saint-Éloi (assistant)
- 2011–2012: TSV Apensen (player-manager)
- 2013–2014: Klub Kosova Hamburg
- 2019–2020: Antigua and Barbuda
- 2022–2023: DR Congo U20
- 2024–: KFC Uerdingen 05 (director of sport)
- * Club domestic league appearances and goals

Michél Mazingu-Sinda-Dinzey (born 15 October 1972), also known as Michél Dinzey, is a former professional footballer who played as a midfielder. Born in West Germany, he represented the DR Congo national team. He is the director of sport of KFC Uerdingen 05.

Throughout his career, he has played for several clubs in Germany, including FC St. Pauli, Hertha BSC, TSV 1860 Munich, Hannover 96 and Eintracht Braunschweig.

== Club career ==
=== Early career ===
Dinzey began playing football in his childhood, participating in youth teams in the West Berlin borough of Tempelhof-Schöneberg. In 1988, he joined a Wannsee Junior-A team that played in Steglitz-Zehlendorf, an adjacent West Berlin borough. At 17, he began upper-league play with the first-tier crew of the Wannsee. The following year, he switched to Lichterfelder FC, playing two years for them.

In 1994, Dinzey began his professional career with the Bundesliga, playing for VfB Stuttgart. His debut game in the Bundesliga's 1994–95 season, the first of 14 he played that year, was on 2 August – an away match against TSV 1860 Munich. In the 1995–96 season, with the prospect of becoming a regular starter, he moved to the FC St. Pauli in Hamburg. After playing in 31 games and having scored five goals for Hamburg, Dinzey was drafted to play for Zaire's national team. After the season, he returned to the Bundesliga, signing for Hertha BSC, where for two years he was a regular starter and significantly contributed to the team's success.

=== 1860 Munich ===
In 1998, he accepted a DM1.3 million contract to play for the TSV 1860 Munich team as Horst Heldt's substitute.

During two years he played for Munich only 15 times, scoring one goal. In 2000, the Munich team qualified for the UEFA Champions League, but owing to differences with then-coach Werner Lorant he had little opportunity to participate in the tournament.

=== Hannover 96 ===
Subsequently, he moved to play for Hannover 96 in the second Bundesliga; he earned a regular place and played 13 completed games, scoring two goals.

=== Vålerenga (loan) ===
In 2001, he was on a four-month loan to Norwegian First Division team Vålerenga, where he played ten of 13 games, scoring one goal.

=== Eintracht Braunschweig ===
In 2002, he returned to Germany, playing for Eintracht Braunschweig, but the team finished 15th and he could not prevent the team's relegation from the second Bundesliga to the then third-tier Regionalliga Nord. Despite the fall in rank, he remained in Braunschweig for the 2003–04 season, statistically his most successful; he scored 13 goals in his last season and helped his team achieve the Lower Saxony Cup.

=== FC St. Pauli ===
In 2004, he returned to the FC St. Pauli in the Regionalliga Nord, playing 88 times and scoring 24 goals during his three years in Hamburg; the team twice won the Hamburger Pokal. In 2006 the team reached the semi-finals of the DFB-Pokal but lost to eventual winners Bayern Munich.

=== Holstein Kiel ===
In 2007, St. Pauli was promoted to the Bundesliga's second division, where he was traded to play seven months for the Oberliga Nord's Holstein Kiel team. He played there for ten games and scored a goal before finally ending his playing career.

During his career, Mazingu-Dinzey played professionally in 90 Bundesliga games, 77 Regionalliga games and 220 games overall.

== International career ==
Dinzey made his debut for the Zaire national football team on 19 January 1996 at the African Cup in Durban, South Africa, losing 2–0 to Gabon but winning 2–0 in Johannesburg against Liberia before losing 1–0 to Ghana in the quarter-finals at Port Elizabeth.

He was subsequently part of the Congolese 2000 African Cup squad hosted jointly by Nigeria and Ghana. That team played both Algeria and Gabon to scoreless ties but lost to South Africa 1–0; only South Africa and Algeria had sufficient points to advance to the quarter-finals.

His last year for the Congolese national team was at the 2004 African Cup in Tunisia, when the DR Congo squad lost to Guinea 2–1, to Tunisia 3–0 and to Rwanda 1–0. Having finished bottom of their group in the first round of competition, the team failed to secure qualification for the quarter-finals.

In total, Dinzey played 33 international caps for Congo-Kinshasa.

== Coaching career ==
After retiring as a player Dinzey started working for the German Football Association in October 2008 as a base coach in Hamburg (Steilshoop). From 1 March to 31 December 2009 he was an assistant coach in the DR Congo in the first division team FC Saint Eloi Lupopo in the city of Lubumbashi. He became champion in 2009 and qualified for the 2010 CAF Champions League. In addition, he also worked as a consultant for Global United FC.

After his return from Lubumbashi, he worked occasionally as a consultant and as a talent scout for the Turkish club Diyarbakırspor. In October 2011, Dinzey took over as coach at the district division club TSV Apensen (Stade). In October 2013 he became coach of the sixth division Kosova Hamburg 1977 eV. and left the club at the end of the 2013–2014 season. In December 2014 he started working for TSG 1899 Hoffenheim in the scouting the area.

In early March 2019, Mazingu-Dinzey took over the position of national coach of Antigua and Barbuda. In addition, he was entrusted with the task of promoting the development of the country's football association. On 29 March 2020, Dinzey announced his resignation.

On 25 November 2022, Mazingu-Dinzey was made new manager of the DR Congo national under-20 football team.

In July 2024, he was made director of sport of the German Regionalliga club KFC Uerdingen 05.

== American football ==
In 2011 Dinzey played as a placekicker for Hamburg based American football team St. Pauli Buccaneers, who compete in the third tier Regionalliga.

== TV career ==
In July 2013 Dinzey took over the TV pundits role in Sport1 and acted until 1 January 2015, for live games as an online commentator on Twitter. He also appears as TV expert in coverage of regional matches of the transmitter Sport1.

== Personal life ==
Dinzey committed to various social projects such as Nestwerk e. V. of the founder Reinhold Beckmann or in the fight against drugs and alcohol in children and adolescents in the Department of Psychiatry at the University Hospital Eppendorf in Hamburg. He is also a member of Global United FC, the football world will contest against global warming and is committed to regularly for the annual charity campaign Hamburger kicking with heart.

Dinzey is married and has two children.
