= Guido Gorges =

German footballer

Personal information
- Date of birth: 8 June 1973 (age 53)
- Place of birth: Geismar, East Germany
- Height: 1.94 m (6 ft 4 in)
- Position: Centre-back

Senior career*
Years	Team	Apps	(Gls)
–1995	Rot-Weiß Erfurt		
1995–1996	RSV Göttingen 05		
1996–1997	Wacker Nordhausen	30	(7)
1997–2000	1860 Munich II	47	(3)
1997–2000	1860 Munich	28	(1)
2000–2001	Greuther Fürth	9	(0)
2001–2003	Hannover 96	11	(0)
2002	→ 1. FC Schweinfurt 05 (loan)	13	(0)
2003	Eintracht Braunschweig	13	(0)
2003–2006	SV Wehen	36	(2)
2006–2007	FV Dresden 06		
- * Club domestic league appearances and goals

Guido Gorges (born 8 June 1973) is a German former professional footballer who played as a centre-back. He spent three seasons in the Bundesliga with TSV 1860 Munich and Hannover 96.
