= SG Egelsbach =

German football club

- Full name: Sportgemeinschaft Egelsbach 1874 e.V. – Verein für Leibesübungen
- Founded: 10 November 1945
- Ground: Am Berliner Platz
- Capacity: 6,000
- Chairman: Edgar Karg
- Manager: Armin Schuler
- League: Kreisoberliga Offenbach (VIII)
- 2015–16: 5th
Home colours	Away colours

The SG Egelsbach is a German association football club from the city of Egelsbach, Hesse.

== History ==
The club was formed after the Second World War in 1945 when four local sports associations merged, the FC Egelsbach 1903, TV 1874 Egelsbach, TG 1885 Egelsbach and the Arbeiter-Radfahrverein 1905. Through the TV 1874, which was formed on 15 August 1874, the current club claims its foundation date within the club's name. Like in most other towns and cities within the US occupation zone, only one sports club was permitted to exist. The new SGE was heavily based on the pre-1933 workers clubs, which had been outlawed by the Nazis. But unlike most other places, where, after the liberlisation of occupation laws, the old sport associations re-surfaced, in Egelsbach the merger of the four formerly separate clubs endured.

For the most part of its history, the club existed as a minor local amateur side. The SGE first rose to attention when it earned promotion to the Landesliga Hessen-Süd (IV) in 1974. After a couple of good seasons in this league, a championship was won in 1979 and the SGE entered the Oberliga Hessen for the first time. Before that, in 1976, the club managed for the first time to qualify for the German Cup. In the DFB Cup 1976–77, it beat the 1. FC Mülheim 0–3 in the first round before falling to the VfL Osnabrück 0–2 in the next round.

The club only lasted for two seasons in this league before returning to the Landesliga in 1981. Another decent cup run in the DFB Cup 1980–81 saw the team again reach the second round. After defeating the TuS Neuendorf 3–4 in extra time, the 1. FC Kaiserslautern ended their run in round two. A runners-up spot in 1985 was the highlight of the following Landesliga seasons, before another league championship in 1989 earned it the return to the Oberliga. Immediate relegation from this league was followed by another Landesliga championship and another return to the highest league in the state of Hesse.

The following three seasons saw the SGE do rather well, finishing fourth each year and subsequently earning entry to the new Regionalliga Süd in 1994.

In this league, the club was never more than a struggler and being able to survive for three seasons was certainly a success in itself. Eventually, however, relegation could not be avoided and in 1997 the team went back to the Oberliga. The adventure Regionalliga however had cost the club dearly in financial terms and almost send it broke. A third appearance in the German Cup in 1994 did not change this all that much. Another loss to Kaiserslautern, this time in round one, was nevertheless quite honorable with a 0–2 result.

Back in the Oberliga Hessen, the SGE finished a respectable seventh but a two-point deduction combined with the financial repercussions of semi-professional football forced the club in 1998 to downgrade its ambitions.

The club stepped down to the Bezirksoberliga Darmstadt (VI) for the 1998–99 season.

After a fall to as far as the Kreisliga A-West Offenbach (VIII), the club returned to the Bezirksliga Frankfurt/Offenbach (VII) in 2003. After the 2007–08 season, the Hesse FA overhauled its league system, renaming the Bezirksliga to Kreisoberliga.

In 2008–09, the club had a bad start, sitting on last place in its league all season long, the Kreisoberliga Gruppe Offenbach, and being relegated at the end. It took SGE until 2013 to win promotion back to the Kreisoberliga, after winning the championship in the Kreisliga.

== Honours ==
The club's honours:

=== League ===
- Landesliga Hessen-Süd (IV)
  - Champions: 1979, 1989, 1991
- Kreisliga A Offenbach-West
  - Champions: 2013

=== Cup ===
- Hesse Cup
  - Winner: 1994

== Recent seasons ==
The recent season-by-season performance of the club:

Season	Division	Tier	Position
2002–03	Kreisliga A Offenbach-West	VIII	↑
2003–04	Bezirksliga Frankfurt/Offenbach	VII	9th
2004–05	Bezirksliga Frankfurt/Offenbach	VII	5th
2005–06	Bezirksliga Frankfurt/Offenbach	VII	3rd
2006–07	Bezirksliga Frankfurt/Offenbach	VII	7th
2007–08	Bezirksliga Frankfurt/Offenbach	VII	14th
2008–09	Kreisoberliga Gruppe Offenbach	VIII	16th ↓
2009–10	Kreisliga A Offenbach-West	IX	3rd
2010–11	Kreisliga A Offenbach-West	IX	7th
2011–12	Kreisliga A Offenbach-West	IX	3rd
2012–13	Kreisliga A Offenbach-West	IX	1st ↑
2013–14	Kreisoberliga Offenbach	VIII	9th
2014–15	Kreisoberliga Offenbach	VIII	3rd
2015–16	Kreisoberliga Offenbach	VIII	5th
2016–17	Kreisoberliga Offenbach	VIII	
2017–18	Kreisoberliga Offenbach	VIII	5th
2018–19	Kreisoberliga Offenbach	VIII	8th

- With the introduction of the Regionalligas in 1994 and the 3. Liga in 2008 as the new third tier, below the 2. Bundesliga, all leagues below dropped one tier. Also in 2008, a large number of football leagues in Hesse were renamed, with the Oberliga Hessen becoming the Hessenliga, the Landesliga becoming the Verbandsliga, the Bezirksoberliga becoming the Gruppenliga and the Bezirksliga becoming the Kreisoberliga.

↑ Promoted	↓ Relegated
