= Detlef Irrgang =

German former professional footballer (born 1966)

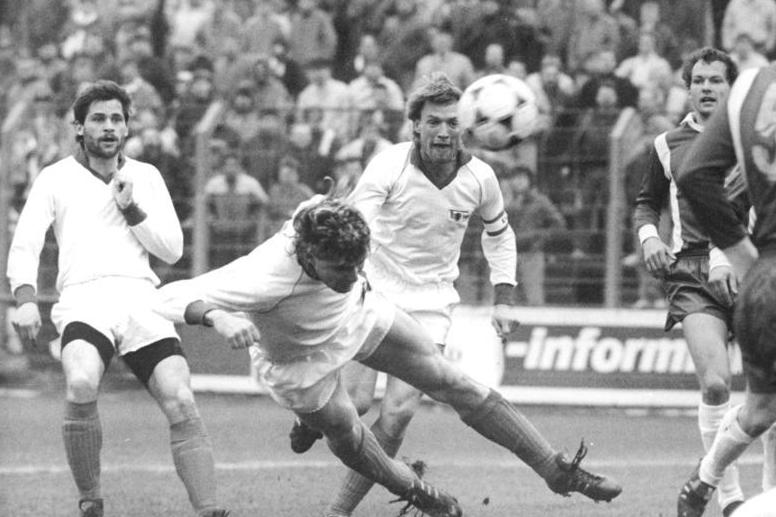
- Detlef Irrgang (first from right) in 1989

Personal information
- Date of birth: 27 May 1966 (age 60)
- Place of birth: Finsterwalde, East Germany
- Height: 1.89 m (6 ft 2 in)
- Position: Attacking midfielder

Youth career
- –1977: Motor Finsterwalde Süd
- 1977–1985: Energie Cottbus

Senior career*
Years	Team	Apps	(Gls)
1985–1991	Energie Cottbus		
1991–1992	Stahl Brandenburg	16	(2)
1992–2000	Energie Cottbus		
- * Club domestic league appearances and goals

Detlef Irrgang (born 27 May 1966) is a German former professional footballer who played as an attacking midfielder. He is best remembered for his two spells with Energie Cottbus, spanning 22 years, over 400 appearances, and the reunification of Germany.

== Career ==
Born in Finsterwalde, Irrgang began his footballing career with Motor Finsterwalde Süd, before joining Cottbus at age 11. He progressed to the first-team, and played for the club in the late-1980s as they yo-yoed between the DDR-Oberliga and the second tier DDR-Liga. After reunification, Energie failed to qualify for the 2. Bundesliga, so Irrgang joined a club who had: he spent the 1991–92 season with Stahl Brandeburg, but returned to Cottbus a year later, after 16 appearances and two goals.

Cottbus were one of the stronger sides in the NOFV-Oberliga Mitte, but could not overtake perennial champions Union Berlin, who were themselves unable to earn promotion. However, Energie's second-place finish in 1994 was enough to qualify for the newly formed Regionalliga Nordost. Irrgang scored 22 goals in his second season at this level, making him the League's top scorer, and better was to come the following year. Cottbus ended the 1996–97 season as league champions, and defeated Hannover 96 in a playoff to earn promotion to the 2. Bundesliga, with Irrgang scoring two goals in the tie. The club had also reached the final of the 1996–97 DFB-Pokal, eventually losing against VfB Stuttgart.

Irrgang continued to be a key player for Cottbus in the second tier, making 84 appearances in three seasons, and scoring 13 goals. He scored the winning goal in his last game for the club, a 1–0 win over 1. FC Köln which secured a remarkable promotion to the Bundesliga. He retired with Energie's all-time appearance record (which he still holds), and the nickname Fußballgott (Football God) from the club's fans.

After retirement, Irrgang continued with Energie in a marketing capacity. He was appointed as the club's general manager during the 2007–08 season, but left the club at the end of the season after a dispute, the details of which are still unknown. He also served as a councillor in Cottbus from 2003 to 2008, as part of the CDU. He continued to live in Cottbus and worked in a gym until March 2020.
