= Frank Süs =

German footballer

Personal information
- Date of birth: 4 December 1969 (age 56)
- Height: 1.69 m (5 ft 7 in)
- Position: Midfielder

Senior career*
Years	Team	Apps	(Gls)
1990–1995	Borussia Neunkirchen		
1995–1996	Hertha BSC		
1996–1998	SG Wattenscheid 09		
1998–2000	SV Eintracht Trier 05		
2000–2002	SC Fortuna Köln		
2002–2003	Bonner SC		
2003–2005	FV Bad Honnef		

Managerial career
- 2017–: FC Hennef 05
- * Club domestic league appearances and goals

Frank Süs (born 4 December 1969) is a retired German football midfielder.
