= Toralf Konetzke =

German footballer (born 1972)

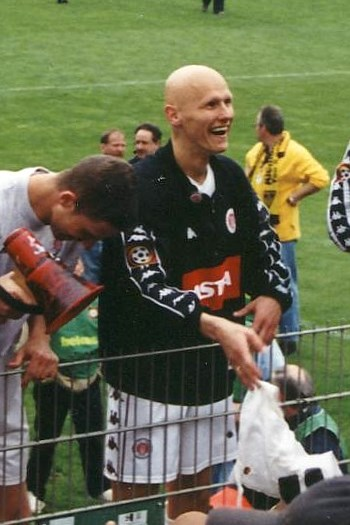
- Konetzke in 2000

Personal information
- Date of birth: 10 December 1972 (age 53)
- Place of birth: Cottbus, East Germany
- Height: 1.76 m (5 ft 9 in)
- Position: Striker

Youth career
- SG Kiekebusch
- –1989: Berliner FC Dynamo

Senior career*
Years	Team	Apps	(Gls)
1989–1998	Energie Cottbus	169	(47)
1998–2000	Fortuna Köln	34	(7)
2000	Energie Cottbus	0	(0)
2001–2002	FC St. Pauli	22	(5)
2002–2003	Wacker Burghausen	15	(3)
2003	FV Dresden 06	13	(2)
Total		253	(64)
- * Club domestic league appearances and goals

Toralf Konetzke (born 10 December 1972) is a German former professional footballer who played as a striker. He spent two seasons in the Bundesliga with FC Energie Cottbus and FC St. Pauli.

== Honours ==
- DFB-Pokal finalist: 1996–97
