= Jens-Uwe Zöphel =

German footballer (born 1969)

Personal information
- Date of birth: 23 June 1969 (age 57)
- Place of birth: Prenzlau, East Germany
- Position: Midfielder

Youth career
- SG Dynamo Gransee
- –1983: BSG Einheit Templin
- 1983–1988: Berliner FC Dynamo

Senior career*
Years	Team	Apps	(Gls)
1988–1995	FC Berlin	125	(6)
1995–1999	Energie Cottbus	115	(9)
1999–2001	1. FC Union Berlin	42	(2)
2001–2002	Wacker Burghausen	15	(0)
2002–2003	Dresdner SC	21	(0)
2003–2004	Germania Schöneiche	27	(14)
2004–2005	Ludwigsfelder FC	27	(2)
2005–2006	Berliner FC Dynamo	22	(3)
2006–2010	MSV 1919 Rüdersdorf		
2010–2013	SV 1919 Woltersdorf		

International career
1989	East Germany U-21	1	(0)
- * Club domestic league appearances and goals

Jens-Uwe Zöphel (born 23 June 1969) is a German former footballer who played as a midfielder. Zöphel joined the youth academy of football club BFC Dynamo in 1983. He made his first appearance with the first team of BFC Dynamo in the 12th matchday of the 1988-89 DDR-Oberliga against FC Carl Zeiss Jena on 19 November 1988. He would then make recurring appearances with the first team during the second half of the season. Zöphel won the FDGB-Pokal with BFC Dynamo in 1989. He then made one appearance for BFC Dynamo in the 1989-90 European Cup Winners' Cup. Zöphel was part of the starting line-up in the return leg of the second round against AS Monaco at the Friedrich-Ludwig-Jahn-Sportpark on 1 November 1989.
