= Thomas Pröpper =

German footballer

Personal information
- Date of birth: 4 August 1970 (age 56)
- Place of birth: Dorsten, Germany
- Position: Midfielder

Youth career
- –1989: Schalke 04

Senior career*
Years	Team	Apps	(Gls)
1989–1994	Wuppertaler SV		
1993	→ Hannover 96		
1994–1995	Rot-Weiss Essen		
1995	SG Union Solingen		
1996	Wuppertaler SV		
1996–1997	Rot-Weiß Oberhausen		
1997–1998	LR Ahlen		
1998–1999	Rot-Weiss Essen		
1999–2000	1. FC Bocholt		
2000–2003	VfB Speldorf		
- * Club domestic league appearances and goals

Thomas Pröpper (born 4 August 1970) is a German former professional footballer who played as a midfielder.
