= List of 1. FC Union Berlin players =

A list of 1. FC Union Berlin players, past and present.

== Player list ==
As of 19 September 2010

Player	Nation	From	to	League Apps	League Goals	Cup Apps	Cup Goals	Int. Apps	Int. Goals	Total Apps	Total Goals
René Adamczewski	(Germany)	1986	1994	112 / 0	28 / 0	15	3	0	0	127	31
Ivaylo Andonov	(Bulgaria)	1999	2000	27 / 1	7 / 0	0	0	0	0	28	7
Andreas Anter	(Germany)	1980	1983	13 / 2	1 / 1	3	1	0	0	18	3
Adrian Antunović	(Croatia)	2007	2010	4 / 0	0 / 0	8	4	0	0	12	4
Heiner Backhaus	(Germany)	2002	2003	8 / 0	0 / 0	2	0	0	0	10	0
Andreas Baingo	(Germany)	1975	1976	4 / 0	0 / 0	0	0	0	0	4	0
Jiří Balcárek	(Czech Republic)	1999	2004	122 / 4	5 / 0	19	7	2	0	147	12
Sergej Barbarez	(Bosnia and Herzegovina)	1993	1996	88 / 0	46 / 0	15	13	0	0	103	59
André Barylla	(Germany)	1992	1993	10 / 0	0 / 0	2	0	0	0	12	0
Werner Basel	(Germany)	1966	1966	4 / 0	0 / 0	0	0	0	0	4	0
Erdal Bastürk	(Turkey)	2008	2009	0 / 0	0 / 0	3	0	0	0	3	0
Daniel Bauer	(Germany)	2007	2007	10 / 0	0 / 0	1	0	0	0	11	0
Steffen Baumgart	(Germany)	2002	2004	64 / 0	22 / 0	4	1	0	0	68	23
Christian Beeck	(Germany)	1993	1995	36 / 0	3 / 0	14	4	0	0	50	7
Jürgen Belger	(Germany)	1966	1970	44 / 0	0 / 0	1	0	6	0	51	0
Felix Below	(Germany)	2004	2005	20 / 0	0 / 0	4	1	0	0	24	1
Michael Bemben	(Germany)	2007	2010	90 / 0	1 / 0	3	0	0	0	93	1
Thoralf Bennert	(Germany)	1991	1995	109 / 7	25 / 0	17	11	0	0	133	36
Manuel Benthin	(Germany)	2000	2001	11 / 0	0 / 0	3	0	0	0	14	0
Karim Benyamina	(Algeria)	2005	2011	164 / 0	56 / 0	23	25	0	0	187	81
David Bergner	(Germany)	1994	2007	176 / 0	12 / 0	25	6	0	0	201	18
Arijan Berisha	(Albania)	1997	1999	17 / 0	1 / 0	2	2	0	0	19	3
Olaf Besser	(Germany)	1991	1992	38 / 6	18 / 1	5	1	0	0	49	20
Harald Betke	(Germany)	1966	1973	124 / 0	6 / 0	14	1	0	0	138	7
Sven Beuckert	(Germany)	2000	2003	101 / 0	0 / 0	9	0	4	0	114	0
Andreas Biermann	(Germany)	2006	2007	29 / 0	2 / 0	3	1	0	0	32	3
Marcel Billmann	(Germany)	2000	2001	0 / 0	0 / 0	1	0	0	0	1	0
Shergo Biran	(Germany)	2008	2010	48 / 0	21 / 0	6	9	0	0	54	30
Dieter Blochel	(Germany)	1966	1967	4 / 0	0 / 0	1	0	0	0	5	0
Peter Blüher	(Germany)	1966	1971	40 / 0	0 / 0	2	0	0	0	42	0
Thomas Boden	(Germany)	2004	2005	30 / 0	0 / 0	2	0	0	0	32	0
Lazlo Bodnar	(Hungary)	1992	1992	2 / 0	0 / 0	0	0	0	0	2	0
Thorsten Boer	(Germany)	1993	2001	101 / 0	32 / 0	12	6	0	0	113	38
Fritz Bohla	(Germany)	1976	1978	25 / 0	2 / 0	3	0	0	0	28	2
Sebastian Bönig	(Germany)	2005	2009	114 / 0	7 / 0	20	3	0	0	134	10
Uwe Borchardt	(Germany)	1980	1987	151 / 18	57 / 7	16	5	4	0	189	69
Steffen Borkowski	(Germany)	1983	1986	30 / 2	3 / 0	0	0	0	0	32	3
Ismaël Bouzid	(France)	2004	2005	21 / 0	1 / 0	3	0	0	0	24	1
Levente Bozsik	(Hungary)	2000	2001	19 / 3	1 / 1	6	7	0	0	28	9
Axel Brademann	(Germany)	1979	1981	41 / 8	11 / 0	4	2	0	0	53	13
Wilfried Bruhs	(Germany)	1974	1977	6 / 2	0 / 0	2	0	0	0	10	0
Björn Brunnemann	(Germany)	2009	2011	18 / 0	3 / 0	2	0	0	0	20	3
Florian Bruns	(Germany)	2003	2004	43 / 0	3 / 0	2	0	0	0	45	3
Tomáš Bruško	(Slovakia)	2004	2004	11 / 0	1 / 0	0	0	0	0	11	1
Carsten Busch	(Germany)	2008	2010	2 / 0	0 / 0	4	0	0	0	6	0
Steve Burckhardt	(Germany)	1996	1998	1 / 0	0 / 0	0	0	0	0	1	0
Steffen Büttner	(Germany)	1992	1994	14 / 4	1 / 0	1	0	0	0	19	1
Hajrudin Catic	(Bosnia and Herzegovina)	2004	2005	26 / 0	3 / 0	4	2	0	0	30	5
Ferdinand Chifon	(Cameroon)	2001	2002	15 / 0	1 / 0	2	0	4	1	21	2
Almedin Civa	(Bosnia and Herzegovina)	1997	1998	18 / 0	2 / 0	1	0	0	0	19	2
Ryan Coiner	(United States)	2004	2005	32 / 0	12 / 0	5	6	0	0	37	18
Sebastian Creutzberg	(Germany)	2005	2006	3 / 0	0 / 0	0	0	0	0	3	0
Marek Czakon	(Poland)	1995	1996	20 / 0	12 / 0	1	0	0	0	21	12
Dario Dabac	(Croatia)	2003	2004	25 / 0	0 / 0	1	0	0	0	26	0
Jörn Dahms	(Germany)	1982	1987	38 / 2	0 / 0	4	0	0	0	44	0
René Deffke	(Germany)	1988	1995	27 / 0	4 / 0	2	5	0	0	29	9
Frank Deville	(Luxembourg)	1996	1996	5 / 0	0 / 0	0	0	0	0	5	0
Lutuf Dinc	(Germany)	2000	2002	1 / 0	0 / 0	5	7	0	0	6	7
Petar Divić	(Serbia)	2001	2003	22 / 0	7 / 0	1	1	0	0	23	8
Bozidar Djurković	(Serbia)	2000	2002	49 / 0	4 / 0	6	3	3	1	58	8
Hüzeyfe Doğan	(Germany)	2008	2010	61 / 0	12 / 0	6	8	0	0	67	20
Tobias Döge	(Germany)	2005	2006	1 / 0	0 / 0	0	0	0	0	1	0
Michael Dörfel	(Germany)	1972	1976	3 / 5	0 / 0	1	0	0	0	9	0
Markus Drabinski	(Germany)	1994	1995	2 / 0	0 / 0	1	0	0	0	3	0
Tony East	(Nigeria)	1998	1998	2 / 0	0 / 0	1	0	0	0	3	0
Chinedu Ede	(Germany)	2010	2012	19 / 0	2 / 0	1	0	0	0	20	2
Sven Ehrcke	(Germany)	2006	2006	3 / 0	0 / 0	0	0	0	0	3	0
Dieter Eichler	(Germany)	1972	1975	33 / 10	5 / 3	5	1	0	0	48	9
Boris Ekmescic	(Croatia)	1992	1993	2 / 0	0 / 0	1	0	0	0	3	0
Youssef El-Akchaoui	(Morocco)	2002	2003	11 / 0	0 / 0	0	0	0	0	11	0
Luiz Firmino Emerson	(Brazil)	2004	2004	5 / 0	0 / 0	2	1	0	0	7	1
Steffen Enge	(Germany)	1987	1990	49 / 0	14 / 0	5	1	0	0	54	15
Lothar Enzmann	(Germany)	1985	1986	20 / 0	0 / 0	4	1	0	0	24	1
Daniel Ernemann	(Germany)	1999	2004	126 / 4	3 / 0	7	1	3	0	140	4
Joachim Ernst	(Germany)	1966	1968	49 / 0	14 / 0	3	0	4	1	56	15
Christian Fährmann	(Germany)	2000	2002	13 / 0	0 / 0	6	3	0	0	19	3
Holger Fandrich	(Germany)	1990	1992	65 / 12	7 / 0	9	1	0	0	86	8
Hartmut Felsch	(Germany)	1966	1975	149 / 16	8 / 0	23	2	4	0	192	10
Oscar Ferreira	(Paraguay)	1990	1991	23 / 4	12 / 0	4	1	0	0	31	13
Cristian Fiél	(Spain)	2001	2002	48 / 0	8 / 0	4	2	4	0	56	10
Thomas Fischer	(Germany)	1989	1990	18 / 0	0 / 0	1	0	0	0	19	0
Sven Förster	(Germany)	1986	1987	17 / 0	4 / 0	2	1	3	1	22	6
Jacek Frąckiewicz	(Poland)	1995	1996	32 / 0	16 / 0	2	1	0	0	34	17
Georg Froese	(Germany)	1996	2000	24 / 0	1 / 0	5	2	0	0	29	3
Reinhard Gärtner	(Germany)	1967	1972	62 / 0	22 / 0	9	2	4	1	75	25
Marco Gebhardt	(Germany)	2007	2010	95 / 0	9 / 0	5	1	0	0	100	10
Wolfgang Gehrke	(Germany)	1975	1984	6 / 0	0 / 0	1	0	0	0	7	0
Hartwig Gent	(Germany)	1969	1973	12 / 0	0 / 0	5	1	0	0	17	1
Jan Glinker	(Germany)	2002	2014	185 / 0	0 / 0	15	0	0	0	200	0
Fred Gohl	(Germany)	1973	1974	3 / 0	0 / 0	2	0	0	0	5	0
Daniel Göhlert	(Germany)	2006	2013	112 / 0	1 / 0	11	2	0	0	123	3
Otmar Görlich	(Germany)	1975	1977	2 / 0	0 / 0	2	0	0	0	4	0
Thomas Grether	(Germany)	1989	1991	67 / 5	16 / 2	6	3	0	0	78	21
Jack Grubert	(Germany)	2005	2006	6 / 0	2 / 0	0	0	0	0	6	2
Lubomir Guentchev	(Bulgaria)	2006	2006	2 / 0	0 / 0	1	0	0	0	3	0
Michael Habermann	(Germany)	1973	1975	4 / 0	0 / 0	0	0	0	0	4	0
Peter Hackbusch	(Germany)	1986	1990	14 / 0	1 / 0	1	0	0	0	15	1
Günter Hantke	(Germany)	1973	1975	2 / 0	0 / 0	0	0	0	0	2	0
Jens Härtel	(Germany)	1993	2000	158 / 4	26 / 1	18	1	0	0	180	28
Klaus Härtel	(Germany)	1973	1973	1 / 0	0 / 0	0	0	0	0	1	0
Detlaf Hartmann	(Germany)	1988	1989	8 / 0	0 / 0	2	0	0	0	10	0
Henry Häusler	(Germany)	1975	1976	19 / 8	0 / 0	0	0	0	0	27	0
Martin Hauswald	(Germany)	2004	2005	33 / 0	5 / 0	4	0	0	0	37	5
Andreas Hawa	(Germany)	1979	1994	25 / 0	0 / 0	7	0	0	0	32	0
Mathias Hein	(Germany)	2000	2001	0 / 0	0 / 0	1	0	0	0	1	0
Karsten Heine	(Germany)	1972	1986	170 / 26	18 / 2	16	1	1	0	213	21
Oliver Heine	(Germany)	1997	2001	0 / 0	0 / 0	1	0	0	0	1	0
Werner Heine	(Germany)	1966	1967	16 / 0	2 / 0	1	0	0	0	17	2
Jörg Heinrich	(Germany)	2005	2005	15 / 0	3 / 0	3	3	0	0	18	6
Klaus-Dieter Helbig	(Germany)	1976	1982	107 / 21	13 / 4	11	4	0	0	139	21
Lars Heller	(Germany)	1996	2000	13 / 0	0 / 0	3	0	0	0	16	0
Detlef Helms	(Germany)	1976	1977	3 / 0	0 / 0	0	0	0	0	3	0
Lutz Hendel	(Germany)	1976	1993	344 / 39	23 / 2	33	6	6	0	422	31
Jens Henschel	(Germany)	1991	1993	67 / 8	26 / 2	9	9	0	0	84	37
Simon Henzler	(Germany)	2003	2004	2 / 0	0 / 0	0	0	0	0	2	0
Daniel Herold	(Germany)	1991	1993	20 / 3	6 / 0	5	3	0	0	28	9
Dustin Heun	(Germany)	2008	2009	9 / 0	3 / 0	2	5	0	0	11	8
Dieter Hildebrandt	(Germany)	1973	1975	8 / 0	0 / 0	1	0	0	0	9	0
Wolfgang Hillmann	(Germany)	1966	1972	67 / 0	1 / 0	9	0	5	0	81	1
Michael Hinz	(Germany)	2004	2008	10 / 0	0 / 0	13	0	0	0	23	0
Olaf Hirsch	(Germany)	1986	1989	61 / 0	11 / 0	10	9	5	1	76	21
André Hofschneider	(Germany)	1988	1994	126 / 16	11 / 0	18	4	0	0	160	15
Günter Hoge	(Germany)	1966	1970	78 / 0	5 / 0	9	0	2	0	89	5
David Hollwitz	(Germany)	2008	2010	4 / 0	0 / 0	7	0	0	0	11	0
Lutz Hovest	(Germany)	1979	1987	167 / 16	37 / 3	20	5	4	0	207	45
Wolfgang Hübscher	(Germany)	1966	1970	18 / 0	0 / 0	3	0	2	1	23	1
Rainer Ignaczak	(Germany)	1966	1974	81 / 0	0 / 0	13	0	1	0	95	0
Uche Igwe	(Nigeria)	2002	2003	22 / 0	2 / 0	2	0	0	0	24	2
Harun Isa	(Albania)	2000	2002	62 / 0	22 / 0	10	4	3	0	75	26
Jürgen Jahn	(Germany)	1977	1978	10 / 0	0 / 0	1	0	0	0	11	0
Steven Jahn	(Germany)	2008	2010	6 / 0	0 / 0	6	3	0	0	12	3
Michael Jakob	(Germany)	1973	1975	32 / 10	18 / 6	7	4	0	0	49	28
Ronny Jank	(Germany)	1996	1998	52 / 0	6 / 0	6	12	0	0	58	18
Antoni Jelen	(Poland)	1993	1995	56 / 0	9 / 0	15	6	0	0	71	15
Bernd Jessa	(Germany)	1976	1979	33 / 0	0 / 0	3	0	0	0	36	0
Bernd Jopek	(Germany)	1984	1990	13 / 0	1 / 0	5	1	0	0	18	2
Björn Joppe	(Germany)	2003	2004	12 / 0	0 / 0	2	0	0	0	14	0
Donizeti Vierira Telles Juarez	(Brazil)	1998	1999	13 / 0	1 / 0	1	0	0	0	14	1
Wolfgang Juhrsch	(Germany)	1969	1975	113 / 0	16 / 0	14	1	0	0	127	17
Milan Kachmerov	(Bulgaria)	1990	1991	10 / 0	1 / 0	0	0	0	0	10	1
Peter Kahlert	(Germany)	1967	1970	0 / 0	0 / 0	0	0	5	0	5	0
Frank Kaiser	(Germany)	2004	2007	56 / 0	1 / 0	13	4	0	0	69	5
Helmut Kalbe	(Germany)	1966	1969	10 / 0	1 / 0	2	2	0	0	12	3
Robert Kalbus	(Germany)	2005	2006	0 / 0	0 / 0	1	0	0	0	1	0
Dirk Kampfhenkel	(Germany)	1983	1984	1 / 0	0 / 0	0	0	0	0	1	0
René Kanow	(Germany)	1988	1989	8 / 0	0 / 0	2	0	0	0	10	0
Dietmar Katarczinski	(Germany)	1976	1982	6 / 0	0 / 0	0	0	0	0	6	0
Heinz Kaulmann	(Germany)	1966	1966	14 / 0	9 / 0	0	0	0	0	14	9
Peter Kay	(Germany)	1969	1970	0 / 0	0 / 0	1	0	0	0	1	0
Jeff Kayser	(Germany)	2004	2005	2 / 0	0 / 0	0	0	0	0	2	0
Salif Keita	(Senegal)	2002	2004	58 / 0	13 / 0	4	2	0	0	62	15
Bernd Kempke	(Germany)	1973	1974	22 / 3	2 / 0	3	0	0	0	28	2
Markus Kernal	(Austria)	1999	2000	1 / 0	0 / 0	2	1	0	0	3	1
Dirk Ketzer	(Germany)	1987	1988	4 / 0	0 / 0	1	0	0	0	5	0
Ingo Kimmritz	(Germany)	1983	1985	41 / 2	3 / 0	2	0	0	0	45	3
Oliver Kirchel	(Germany)	1993	1995	17 / 0	0 / 0	4	0	0	0	21	0
Paul Kirstein	(Germany)	2004	2005	1 / 0	0 / 0	0	0	0	0	1	0
Dirk Kittner	(Germany)	1982	1983	0 / 0	0 / 0	1	0	0	0	1	0
Günter Klausch	(Germany)	1968	1974	148 / 6	13 / 0	17	2	0	0	171	15
Gerald Klews	(Germany)	1995	1997	62 / 0	6 / 0	9	1	0	0	71	7
Oliver Klotz	(Germany)	1984	1986	33 / 0	7 / 0	1	0	0	0	34	7
Joachim Kluck	(Germany)	1966	1967	1 / 0	0 / 0	0	0	0	0	1	0
Marvin Kluge	(Germany)	2000	2001	0 / 0	0 / 0	1	0	0	0	1	0
Daniel Knuth	(Germany)	1989	1992	6 / 0	1 / 0	1	1	0	0	7	2
Benjamin Koch	(Germany)	2004	2007	39 / 0	0 / 0	8	1	0	0	47	1
Dirk Koenen	(Germany)	1981	1989	112 / 9	1 / 0	15	0	0	0	136	1
Patrick Kohlmann	(Republic of Ireland)	2008	2014	59 / 0	0 / 0	5	0	0	0	62	0
Hristo Koilov	(Bulgaria)	1999	2003	111 / 4	10 / 1	13	1	4	1	132	13
Frank Kolbe	(Germany)	1982	1983	1 / 0	0 / 0	0	0	0	0	1	0
Santi Kolk	(Netherlands)	2010	2012	4 / 0	2 / 0	1	0	0	0	5	2
Kim Konrad	(Germany)	1991	1992	12 / 1	0 / 0	0	0	0	0	13	0
André Koranzki	(Germany)	1982	1983	3 / 0	0 / 0	0	0	0	0	3	0
Klaus Korn	(Germany)	1966	1970	99 / 0	2 / 0	12	0	0	0	111	2
Oskar Kosche	(Germany)	1993	1999	180 / 0	1 / 0	24	0	0	0	204	1
Andres Kossowski	(Germany)	1997	1998	4 / 0	0 / 0	1	2	0	0	5	2
Marco Kostmann	(Germany)	1989	1991	36 / 0	0 / 0	4	0	0	0	40	0
Robert Kovacic	(Croatia)	1998	1998	2 / 0	0 / 0	1	0	0	0	3	0
Nart Kovulmaz	(Germany)	2005	2007	13 / 0	1 / 0	5	3	0	0	18	4
Ivan Kozak	(Slovakia)	2001	2004	43 / 0	0 / 0	4	0	2	0	49	0
Peter Közle	(Germany)	1998	1999	27 / 0	7 / 0	2	2	0	0	29	9
Emil Kremenliev	(Bulgaria)	2001	2002	27 / 0	1 / 0	5	0	4	0	36	1
Andreas Krüger	(Germany)	1989	1991	35 / 0	2 / 0	6	0	0	0	41	2
Waldemar Ksienzyk	(Germany)	1981	1984	59 / 10	2 / 0	3	0	0	0	72	2
Marco Küntzel	(Germany)	1995	1998	94 / 0	12 / 0	12	9	0	0	106	21
Stephan Künzl	(Germany)	1995	1998	0 / 0	0 / 0	2	0	0	0	2	0
Tobias Kurbjuweit	(Germany)	2005	2006	29 / 0	6 / 0	4	4	0	0	33	10
Herbert Kuscha	(Germany)	1978	1981	13 / 0	1 / 0	1	0	0	0	14	1
Olaf Ladewig	(Germany)	1984	1985	10 / 0	0 / 0	0	0	0	0	10	0
Heiko Lahn	(Germany)	1982	1988	74 / 1	2 / 0	11	1	6	1	92	4
Reinhard Lauck	(Germany)	1968	1973	131 / 0	21 / 0	14	2	0	0	145	23
Alexis Lenhard	(Germany)	2008	2009	0 / 0	0 / 0	1	0	0	0	1	0
Axel Leonhardt	(Germany)	1975	1976	2 / 0	0 / 0	0	0	0	0	2	0
Falko Leuschner	(Germany)	1973	1978	12 / 0	0 / 0	3	1	0	0	15	1
Henryk Lihsa	(Germany)	1989	1992	63 / 9	0 / 0	11	0	0	0	83	0
Horst Linde	(Germany)	1985	1986	10 / 0	0 / 0	4	0	0	0	14	0
Christoph Lindenberg	(Germany)	2007	2008	0 / 0	0 / 0	1	0	0	0	1	0
Harald Lindner	(Germany)	1980	1983	36 / 5	1 / 0	6	2	0	0	47	3
Ludwig Lippold	(Germany)	2008	2009	0 / 0	0 / 0	4	0	0	0	4	0
Marco Löring	(Germany)	2008	2008	11 / 0	1 / 0	2	0	0	0	13	1
Joachim Loth	(Germany)	1972	1975	45 / 12	11 / 3	7	2	0	0	64	16
Karsten Lüders	(Germany)	1974	1976	12 / 2	0 / 0	1	0	0	0	15	0
Ahmed Reda Madouni	(Algeria)	2010	2012	4 / 0	0 / 0	1	0	0	0	5	0
Kevin Maek	(Germany)	2008	2009	10 / 0	0 / 0	6	1	0	0	16	1
Mario Maek	(Germany)	1988	1995	134 / 15	19 / 2	18	3	0	0	167	24
Leo Maric	(Bosnia and Herzegovina)	1998	1998	11 / 0	1 / 0	1	0	0	0	12	1
Goran Markov	(North Macedonia)	1993	1995	62 / 4	41 / 1	15	11	0	0	81	53
Erhard Marquardt	(Germany)	1970	1975	20 / 6	1 / 0	2	1	0	0	28	2
Tom Martins	(Germany)	2006	2008	6 / 0	2 / 0	5	2	0	0	11	4
Enica Matache	(Romania)	1992	1995	44 / 4	1 / 0	10	1	0	0	58	2
Markus Mätschke	(Germany)	2005	2007	11 / 0	0 / 0	5	1	0	0	16	1
Vittorio Mattera-Iacono	(Italy)	1999	2000	0 / 0	0 / 0	2	0	0	0	2	0
Wolfgang Matthies	(Germany)	1974	1988	202 / 20	0 / 0	25	0	6	0	253	0
Torsten Mattuschka	(Germany)	2005	2014	148 / 0	28 / 0	20	9	0	0	168	37
Biggie Mbasela	(Zambia)	1992	1993	31 / 10	15 / 1	3	1	0	0	44	17
Frank Melzer	(Germany)	1977	1985	29 / 5	6 / 0	3	0	0	0	37	6
Jacek Mencel	(Poland)	1990	1994	105 / 10	64 / 1	17	13	0	0	132	78
Christoph Menz	(Germany)	2007	2013	51 / 0	0 / 0	12	0	0	0	63	0
Steffen Menze	(Germany)	1998	2003	149 / 4	37 / 0	9	3	4	0	166	40
Sven Meyer	(Germany)	1996	1997	40 / 0	5 / 0	9	3	0	0	49	8
Vanko Micevski	(North Macedonia)	1998	1999	17 / 0	4 / 0	3	2	0	0	20	6
Lutz Möckel	(Germany)	1973	1984	169 / 26	7 / 4	15	1	0	0	210	12
Michael Molata	(Germany)	2002	2004	53 / 0	1 / 0	2	0	0	0	55	1
Matthias Morack	(Germany)	1986	1991	69 / 6	2 / 1	9	1	0	0	84	4
John Jairo Mosquera	(Colombia)	2009	2012	34 / 0	7 / 0	2	0	0	0	36	7
Marco Möwe	(Germany)	1996	1997	0 / 0	0 / 0	1	0	0	0	1	0
Bernd Müller	(Germany)	1969	1973	55 / 0	1 / 0	9	2	0	0	64	3
Florian Müller	(Germany)	2004	2005	17 / 0	0 / 0	5	1	0	0	22	1
Gert Müller	(Germany)	1996	2002	89 / 0	3 / 0	19	3	0	0	108	6
Rainer Müller	(Germany)	1967	1970	22 / 0	3 / 0	7	2	6	0	35	5
Benedetto Muzzicato	(Italy)	2004	2005	9 / 0	1 / 0	1	0	0	0	10	1
Andreas Nagel	(Germany)	1986	1988	1 / 0	0 / 0	1	0	0	0	2	0
Ulrich Netz	(Germany)	1974	1982	103 / 17	35 / 3	7	1	0	0	127	39
Frank Neumann	(Germany)	1975	1977	2 / 0	0 / 0	1	0	0	0	3	0
Stephan Nevoigt	(Germany)	1997	1999	19 / 0	2 / 0	3	1	0	0	22	3
Eric Niendorf	(Germany)	2007	2009	0 / 0	0 / 0	1	0	0	0	1	0
Ronny Nikol	(Germany)	1997	2003	196 / 4	11 / 0	24	1	4	0	228	12
Denis Novacic	(Germany)	1997	1999	16 / 0	1 / 0	1	0	0	0	17	1
Dieter Nowatzki	(Germany)	1970	1971	1 / 0	0 / 0	0	0	0	0	1	0
Adnan Oçelli	(Albania)	1995	1996	9 / 0	2 / 0	0	0	0	0	9	2
Michael Oelkuch	(Germany)	1998	1999	19 / 0	7 / 0	0	0	0	0	19	7
Konstantin Ognjanovic	(Serbia)	2000	2000	2 / 0	0 / 0	3	4	0	0	5	4
Dirk Ohlbrecht	(Germany)	1989	1990	11 / 0	0 / 0	0	0	0	0	11	0
Chibuike Okeke	(Nigeria)	2000	2004	105 / 4	6 / 1	19	5	2	0	130	12
Yuzuru Okuyama	(Japan)	2005	2006	7 / 0	0 / 0	2	0	0	0	9	0
Frédéric Page	(Switzerland)	2003	2004	30 / 0	3 / 0	2	0	0	0	32	3
Frank Pagelsdorf	(Germany)	1992	1994	0 / 0	0 / 0	4	1	0	0	4	1
Klaus Papies	(Germany)	1969	1980	147 / 9	3 / 0	17	1	0	0	173	4
Michael Parensen	(Germany)	2009	2020	42 / 0	0 / 0	1	0	0	0	43	0
Michael Paschek	(Germany)	1973	1979	91 / 9	34 / 0	13	2	0	0	113	36
Nico Patschinski	(Germany)	1994	2009	139 / 0	43 / 0	21	14	0	0	160	57
Silvio Pätz	(Germany)	2003	2004	25 / 0	0 / 0	1	0	0	0	26	0
Dominic Peitz	(Germany)	2009	2011	20 / 0	2 / 0	2	0	0	0	22	2
Peter Pera	(Germany)	1969	1974	123 / 5	15 / 0	11	1	0	0	139	16
Tom Persich	(Germany)	1994	2006	280 / 4	13 / 1	33	2	4	0	321	16
Daniel Petrowsky	(Germany)	1996	1999	92 / 0	3 / 0	10	0	0	0	102	3
Thomas Petzold	(Germany)	1989	1998	95 / 0	2 / 0	14	0	0	0	109	2
Achim Pfuderer	(Germany)	2003	2004	16 / 0	0 / 0	2	0	0	0	18	0
Martin Pieckenhagen	(Germany)	1991	1993	43 / 7	0 / 0	9	0	0	0	59	0
Frank Placzek	(Germany)	1987	1997	180 / 12	6 / 0	25	3	0	0	217	9
Jérôme Polenz	(Germany)	2010	2012	3 / 0	0 / 0	1	0	0	0	4	0
Dian Popov	(Bulgaria)	1999	2005	27 / 0	2 / 0	5	11	0	0	32	13
Aidas Preiksaitis	(Lithuania)	2000	2000	24 / 3	1 / 1	5	1	0	0	32	3
Ralph Probst	(Germany)	1985	1988	76 / 0	2 / 0	14	3	6	2	96	7
Ulf-Volker Probst	(Germany)	1987	1989	33 / 0	3 / 0	7	3	0	0	40	6
Roman Prokoph	(Germany)	2004	2005	39 / 0	4 / 0	7	7	0	0	46	11
Bernd Prüfer	(Germany)	1970	1971	2 / 0	0 / 0	0	0	0	0	2	0
Ulrich Prüfke	(Germany)	1966	1970	121 / 0	8 / 0	10	0	6	0	137	8
Bernd Quade	(Germany)	1976	1983	70 / 11	21 / 2	6	2	0	0	87	25
Ralf Quest	(Germany)	1966	1970	85 / 0	14 / 0	10	1	6	1	101	16
Christopher Quiring	(Germany)	2010	2017	1 / 0	0 / 0	1	0	0	0	2	0
Ralf Rambow	(Germany)	1993	1995	40 / 0	9 / 0	14	4	0	0	54	13
Marcel Rath	(Germany)	2005	2005	14 / 0	2 / 0	0	0	0	0	14	2
Bernd Rauw	(Belgium)	2009	2011	23 / 0	0 / 0	1	0	0	0	24	0
Dennis Rehausen	(Germany)	2004	2005	3 / 0	0 / 0	0	0	0	0	3	0
Dirk Rehbein	(Germany)	1993	1995	55 / 0	19 / 0	10	4	0	0	65	23
Marko Rehmer	(Germany)	1990	1996	89 / 3	15 / 0	14	4	0	0	106	19
Jürgen Reimann	(Germany)	1973	1974	3 / 0	0 / 0	1	0	0	0	4	0
Olaf Reinhold	(Germany)	1979	1989	190 / 9	11 / 1	22	0	6	0	227	12
Utz Reincke	(Germany)	1988	1989	6 / 0	0 / 0	0	0	0	0	6	0
Peter Rentzsch	(Germany)	1966	1967	2 / 0	0 / 0	0	0	0	0	2	0
Peter Riedtke	(Germany)	1982	1986	34 / 2	6 / 1	6	0	0	0	42	7
Mike Rietpietsch	(Germany)	1992	1993	29 / 0	2 / 0	11	5	0	0	40	7
Sreto Ristić	(Serbia)	2001	2004	82 / 0	22 / 0	7	1	4	1	93	24
Salvatore Rogoli	(Italy)	2006	2007	22 / 0	3 / 0	5	0	0	0	27	3
Rainer Rohde	(Germany)	1976	1983	163 / 22	26 / 3	16	3	0	0	201	32
Bernd Röpcke	(Germany)	1972	1974	6 / 8	1 / 1	2	1	0	0	16	3
Mirko Rosocha	(Germany)	1989	1990	8 / 0	0 / 0	0	0	0	0	8	0
Marco Roßdeutscher	(Germany)	1985	1988	34 / 0	0 / 0	8	1	6	0	48	1
Stefan Rother	(Germany)	1983	1984	2 / 0	0 / 0	0	0	0	0	2	0
Andreas Ruhmland	(Germany)	2000	2003	0 / 0	0 / 0	2	0	0	0	2	0
Steven Ruprecht	(Germany)	2005	2008	74 / 0	6 / 0	17	6	0	0	91	12
Tim Ruttke	(Germany)	2006	2009	2 / 0	0 / 0	5	0	0	0	7	0
Kenan Şahin	(Turkey)	2009	2011	47 / 0	8 / 0	1	0	0	0	48	8
Hans-Joachim Sammel	(Germany)	1971	1972	32 / 0	1 / 0	6	1	0	0	38	2
Jan Sandmann	(Germany)	2002	2004	53 / 0	1 / 0	3	0	0	0	56	1
Holger Sattler	(Germany)	1982	1987	62 / 0	1 / 0	7	0	1	0	70	1
Halil Savran	(Turkey)	2010	2012	3 / 0	0 / 0	0	0	0	0	3	0
Tobias Scharlau	(Germany)	2006	2008	4 / 0	0 / 0	5	1	0	0	9	1
Heiko Schickgram	(Germany)	1990	1990	16 / 0	2 / 0	0	0	0	0	16	2
Steffen Schlegel	(Germany)	1987	1989	21 / 0	0 / 0	3	0	0	0	24	0
Ingo Schneider	(Germany)	1992	2001	55 / 4	5 / 0	8	0	0	0	67	5
Tom Schneider	(Germany)	2003	2005	1 / 0	0 / 0	1	0	0	0	2	0
Peter Schoknecht	(Germany)	1987	1989	46 / 0	2 / 0	4	1	0	0	50	3
Rainer Schönborn	(Germany)	1966	1969	2 / 0	0 / 0	1	0	0	0	3	0
Rayk Schröder	(Germany)	1995	1996	32 / 0	0 / 0	2	0	0	0	34	0
Stephan Schultze	(Germany)	1997	1999	17 / 0	0 / 0	0	0	0	0	17	0
Bernd Schulz	(Germany)	1990	1991	16 / 6	4 / 2	3	1	0	0	25	7
Daniel Schulz	(Germany)	2004	2010	97 / 0	12 / 0	11	2	0	0	108	14
Torsten Schutt	(Germany)	1997	1999	3 / 0	0 / 0	0	0	0	0	3	0
Jörg Schwanke	(Germany)	1995	2006	100 / 3	2 / 0	7	0	0	0	110	2
René Sebastian	(Germany)	1996	1998	5 / 0	0 / 0	1	0	0	0	6	0
Kay Seefeldt	(Germany)	1991	1991	0 / 0	0 / 0	2	0	0	0	2	0
Olaf Seier	(Germany)	1983	1991	192 / 6	40 / 0	22	7	6	2	226	49
Marco Sejna	(Germany)	2004	2005	19 / 0	0 / 0	1	0	0	0	20	0
Joachim Sigusch	(Germany)	1970	1981	243 / 31	40 / 12	26	11	0	0	300	63
Karsten Simon	(Germany)	1973	1976	10 / 6	0 / 0	1	0	0	0	17	0
Ivica Šimunic	(Croatia)	1998	1999	10 / 0	0 / 0	2	1	0	0	12	1
David Siradze	(Georgia (country))	2004	2004	12 / 0	1 / 0	0	0	0	0	12	1
André Sirocks	(Germany)	1985	1991	113 / 0	20 / 0	13	4	0	0	126	24
Ervin Skela	(Albania)	1995	1997	57 / 0	8 / 0	9	7	0	0	66	15
Thomas Sobotzik	(Germany)	2003	2004	29 / 0	7 / 0	2	0	0	0	31	7
Peter Soland	(Germany)	1970	1972	14 / 0	1 / 0	2	1	0	0	16	2
Mirko Soltau	(Germany)	2004	2005	19 / 0	0 / 0	3	1	0	0	22	1
Fabio Nogueira de Souza	(Brazil)	1999	2000	14 / 0	0 / 0	2	1	0	0	16	1
Alexei Spasskov	(Russia)	2007	2008	8 / 0	0 / 0	3	0	0	0	11	0
Guido Spork	(Germany)	2006	2008	67 / 0	7 / 0	8	4	0	0	75	11
Günter Stange	(Germany)	1966	1966	2 / 0	0 / 0	0	0	0	0	2	0
Jürgen Steinke	(Germany)	1968	1969	1 / 0	0 / 0	1	0	0	0	2	0
Jürgen Stoppok	(Germany)	1966	1970	54 / 0	5 / 0	8	0	5	0	67	5
Ralf Sträßer	(Germany)	1984	1987	79 / 0	38 / 0	13	8	5	3	97	49
Mathias Straub	(Germany)	2004	2005	29 / 0	0 / 0	4	0	0	0	33	0
Christian Streit	(Germany)	2006	2008	47 / 0	0 / 0	10	5	0	0	57	5
Norman Struck	(Germany)	1996	1999	56 / 0	17 / 0	10	0	0	0	66	17
Christian Stuff	(Germany)	2006	2014	126 / 0	9 / 0	19	7	0	0	145	16
Anders Swahn	(Sweden)	1998	1999	10 / 0	0 / 0	0	0	0	0	10	0
Nicky Taubert	(Germany)	2003	2005	7 / 0	0 / 0	0	0	0	0	7	0
Daniel Teixeira	(Brazil)	2001	2007	66 / 0	47 / 0	12	20	0	0	78	67
Ronny Teuber	(Germany)	1984	1986	22 / 0	0 / 0	1	0	0	0	23	0
Günther Thiele	(Germany)	1991	1991	5 / 2	1 / 0	0	0	0	0	7	1
Heiner Thomas	(Germany)	1983	1985	10 / 2	1 / 0	0	0	0	0	12	1
Nico Thomaschewski	(Germany)	1999	1999	1 / 0	0 / 0	0	0	0	0	1	0
Paul Thomik	(Germany)	2010	2011	2 / 0	0 / 0	0	0	0	0	2	0
Alexander Tolmachev	(Russia)	1992	1993	3 / 0	0 / 0	0	0	0	0	3	0
Marko Tredup	(Germany)	1993	2002	22 / 0	0 / 0	9	0	0	0	31	0
Henry Treppschuh	(Germany)	1977	1987	111 / 5	2 / 0	11	0	0	0	127	2
Norbert Trieloff	(Germany)	1987	1989	35 / 0	1 / 0	5	1	0	0	40	2
Jens Tschiedel	(Germany)	2000	2001	25 / 0	1 / 0	5	0	0	0	30	1
Meinhard Uentz	(Germany)	1966	1973	151 / 0	53 / 0	16	4	3	0	170	57
Rüdiger Uentz	(Germany)	1974	1976	16 / 4	6 / 0	1	3	0	0	21	9
René Unglaube	(Germany)	1984	1988	74 / 0	10 / 0	8	1	6	0	88	11
Sixten Veit	(Germany)	2002	2003	18 / 0	1 / 0	0	0	0	0	18	1
Bernd Vogel	(Germany)	1970	1980	159 / 9	4 / 0	14	0	0	0	182	4
Frank Vogel	(Germany)	1991	1993	52 / 5	12 / 0	7	4	0	0	64	16
Werner Voigt	(Germany)	1973	1975	46 / 7	6 / 0	7	1	0	0	60	7
Nenad Vučković	(Croatia)	2007	2007	9 / 0	1 / 0	1	0	0	0	10	1
Mario Waldow	(Germany)	1991	1992	18 / 0	0 / 0	0	0	0	0	18	0
Jan Walle	(Germany)	1998	1999	24 / 0	2 / 0	2	0	0	0	26	2
Ingo Walther	(Germany)	1970	1972	9 / 0	0 / 0	0	0	0	0	9	0
Bernd Wargos	(Germany)	1976	1981	28 / 9	0 / 0	3	0	0	0	40	0
Rolf Weber	(Germany)	1972	1981	156 / 31	6 / 1	18	0	0	0	205	7
Tobias Weber	(Germany)	2006	2006	3 / 0	0 / 0	1	0	0	0	4	0
Andreas Wegener	(Germany)	1975	1983	26 / 0	0 / 0	0	0	0	0	26	0
Holger Wehlage	(Germany)	2003	2003	15 / 0	1 / 0	0	0	0	0	15	1
Kay Wehner	(Germany)	1999	2000	33 / 4	0 / 0	2	0	0	0	39	0
Michael Weinrich	(Germany)	1987	1990	17 / 0	1 / 0	1	0	0	0	18	1
Gerhard Weiß	(Germany)	1969	1976	117 / 12	0 / 0	13	0	0	0	142	0
Wolfgang Weißenborn	(Germany)	1966	1969	2 / 0	0 / 0	5	0	3	0	10	0
Mischa Welm	(Germany)	2009	2009	0 / 0	0 / 0	2	0	0	0	2	0
Roland Wendt	(Germany)	1996	1998	58 / 0	0 / 0	7	1	0	0	65	1
Ingo Weniger	(Germany)	1978	1987	148 / 2	7 / 0	17	0	6	1	173	8
Ulrich Werder	(Germany)	1970	1977	111 / 24	8 / 2	15	2	0	0	150	12
Dominik Werling	(Germany)	2004	2005	8 / 0	0 / 0	2	0	0	0	10	0
Kostadin Vidolov	(Bulgaria)	2001	2003	73 / 0	17 / 0	6	1	4	0	83	18
Conny Wieland	(Germany)	1995	1997	3 / 0	0 / 0	0	0	0	0	3	0
Hannes Wilking	(Germany)	2004	2005	4 / 0	0 / 0	3	0	0	0	7	0
Benjamin Wingerter	(Germany)	2004	2005	30 / 0	1 / 0	4	2	0	0	34	3
Peter Wirth	(Germany)	1978	1985	81 / 9	5 / 2	8	0	0	0	98	7
Axel Wittke	(Germany)	1988	1990	37 / 0	3 / 0	2	0	0	0	39	3
Frank Wohlfahrt	(Germany)	1975	1976	4 / 0	1 / 0	0	0	0	0	4	1
René Wolter	(Germany)	1991	1992	5 / 2	0 / 0	1	0	0	0	8	0
Rainer Wroblewski	(Germany)	1977	1981	71 / 4	4 / 0	5	1	0	0	80	5
Torsten Wruck	(Germany)	1990	1991	24 / 3	2 / 0	4	0	0	0	31	2
Wolfgang Wruck	(Germany)	1966	1974	188 / 0	11 / 0	20	1	1	0	209	12
Robert Wulnikowski	(Germany)	1999	2004	55 / 0	0 / 0	14	0	0	0	69	0
Ingo Wunderlich	(Germany)	2005	2007	49 / 0	1 / 0	5	1	0	0	54	2
Dieter Wünsch	(Germany)	1975	1980	30 / 8	0 / 0	4	0	0	0	42	0
Macchambes Younga-Mouhani	(Republic of the Congo)	2007	2011	91 / 0	8 / 0	7	1	0	0	98	9
Adalbert Zafirov	(Bulgaria)	1999	2001	34 / 3	3 / 0	10	0	0	0	47	3
Michael Zechner	(Austria)	1999	2001	67 / 4	6 / 0	16	8	1	0	88	14
Harry Zedler	(Germany)	1968	1971	62 / 0	10 / 0	7	1	0	0	69	11
Piotr Zelazowski	(Poland)	1992	1995	33 / 2	1 / 0	7	0	0	0	42	1
Martin Zimmer	(Germany)	1993	1994	0 / 0	0 / 0	1	0	0	0	1	0
Matthias Zimmerling	(Germany)	1991	1997	83 / 9	34 / 4	12	16	0	0	104	54
Andreas Zimmermann	(Germany)	1995	1996	29 / 0	0 / 0	1	0	0	0	30	0
Olaf Zimmermann	(Germany)	1989	1993	48 / 5	0 / 0	11	2	0	0	64	2
Jens-Uwe Zöphel	(Germany)	1999	2001	42 / 3	3 / 0	9	4	0	0	54	7
Markus Zschiesche	(Germany)	2006	2007	44 / 0	1 / 0	6	2	0	0	50	3
