= 1999–2000 Tennis Borussia Berlin season =

Tennis Borussia Berlin
1999–2000 season
- Manager: Winfried Schäfer
- Stadium: Mommsenstadion (11), Olympiastadion (6)
- 2. Bundesliga: 13th (relegated)
- DFB-Pokal: Third round
- Berliner Landespokal: Winners (Reserve team)
- Top goalscorer: League: Saša Ćirić (14); All: Saša Ćirić (16)
- Highest home attendance: 9,600 (vs. FC Energie Cottbus)
- Lowest home attendance: 1,400 (vs. SC Fortuna Köln)
- Average home league attendance: 3,576

The 1999–2000 season was the ninth time Tennis Borussia Berlin played in the 2. Bundesliga, the second highest tier of the German football league system. After 34 league games, Tennis Borussia finished 13th. Saša Ćirić scored 14 of the club's 42 league goals. However, ten days following the last round of league games, the German Football Association revoked TeBe's license for the following season, and as a result, the club were relegated instead of the Stuttgarter Kickers. The club made it to the third round of the DFB-Pokal where they lost 3–2 after extra time to Hertha BSC. The club's reserve team, Tennis Borussia Berlin (Amateure), won the Berliner Landespokal, beating Berliner FC Dynamo 2–0 in the final at the Friedrich-Ludwig-Jahn-Sportpark.

== 1999–2000 Tennis Borussia Berlin squad ==
No.	Pos.	Nation	Player
30	GK	(Germany) GER	Thaddäus Bohne
36	GK	(Germany) GER	Nico Creutzmann
16	GK	(Germany) GER	Roman Görtz
1	GK	(Switzerland) SUI	Andreas Hilfiker
15	DF	(Turkey) TUR	Taşkın Aksoy
21	DF	(Germany) GER	Manuel Benthin
25	DF	(Germany) GER	Ansgar Brinkmann
22	DF	(Germany) GER	Matthias Hamann
6	DF	(Germany) GER	Olaf Kapagiannidis
4	DF	(Slovakia) SVK	Ivan Kozák
5	DF	(Germany) GER	Jens Melzig
33	DF	(Czech Republic) CZE	Jan Suchopárek
17	DF	(Germany) GER	Ifet Taljević
2	DF	(Germany) GER	Marko Tredup
3	DF	(Switzerland) SUI	Marco Walker
35	MF	(Federal Republic of Yugoslavia) YUG	Duško Adamović

No.	Pos.	Nation	Player
8	MF	(Bosnia and Herzegovina) BIH	Bruno Akrapović
19	MF	(Croatia) CRO	Tonči Boban
—	MF	(Turkey) TUR	Müslüm Can
13	MF	(Germany) GER	Enrico Kern
—	MF	(Turkey) TUR	Celaleddin Koçak
7	MF	(Morocco) MAR	Abderrahim Ouakili
14	MF	(North Macedonia) MKD	Artim Šakiri
23	MF	(Poland) POL	Zbigniew Szewczyk
18	MF	(Germany) GER	Niclas Weiland
9	FW	(North Macedonia) MKD	Saša Ćirić
10	FW	(Spain) ESP	Francisco Copado
11	FW	(Russia) RUS	Sergei Kiriakov
26	FW	(Germany) GER	Mike Lünsmann
20	FW	(Germany) GER	Uwe Rösler
27	FW	(Germany) GER	Christian Tiffert

== 1999–2000 fixtures ==
6 August 1999 DFB-Pokal – R2	KFC Uerdingen 05	0–4	Tennis Borussia Berlin	Grotenburg-Stadion, Krefeld
19:00	Tesiorowski (yellow card) Gaubatz (yellow card)	Report	Rösler 18' (pen.), 74'; Ćirić 57', 81'; Hamann (yellow card) Rösler (yellow card) Copado (yellow card)	Attendance: 2,000; Referee: Peter Gagelmann (Bremen)

15 August 1999 2. Bundesliga	Hannover 96	2–3	Tennis Borussia Berlin	Niedersachsenstadion, Hanover
15:00	Kreuz 18' (pen.); Linke 25'; Cherundolo (yellow card) Tumani (yellow card)	Report	Copado 14'; Ćirić 33'; Ouakili 68'; Akrapović (yellow card) Rösler (yellow card) Walker (yellow card)	Attendance: 16,300; Referee: Jürgen Jansen (Essen)

21 August 1999 2. Bundesliga	Tennis Borussia Berlin	2–2	Karlsruher SC	Mommsenstadion, Berlin
15:30	Kiriakov 40'; Walker 89'; Can (yellow card) Copado (yellow card) Kiriakov (yellow card) Suchopárek (yellow card)	Report	Krieg 44', 48'; Addo (yellow card) Kienle (yellow card)	Attendance: 5,100; Referee: Peter Sippel (Munich)

28 August 1999 2. Bundesliga	Alemannia Aachen	2–2	Tennis Borussia Berlin	Tivoli, Aachen
15:30	Schmidt 52' (pen.) von Ahlen 88'; Bashi (yellow card) Heeren (yellow card) Klein (yellow card) Landgraf (yellow card)	Report	Ćirić 60' (pen.), 83' (pen.); Rösler (yellow card) Suchopárek (yellow card) Szewczyk (yellow card) Walker (yellow card)	Attendance: 18,000; Referee: Volker Wezel (Tübingen)

10 September 1999 2. Bundesliga	Tennis Borussia Berlin	2–0	FC St. Pauli	Mommsenstadion, Berlin
19:00	Brinkmann 59'; Ćirić 86'; Akrapović (yellow card) Melzig (yellow card) Suchopárek (yellow card)	Report	Puschmann (yellow card) Klasnić (yellow card)	Attendance: 4,600; Referee: Knut Kircher (Rottenburg am Neckar)

20 September 1999 2. Bundesliga	1. FC Köln	1–1	Tennis Borussia Berlin	Müngersdorfer Stadion, Cologne
20:15	Hasenhüttl 78'; Azizi (yellow card) Sichone (yellow card)	Report	Walker 15'; Akrapović (yellow card) Kozák (yellow card) Tredup (yellow card); Copado (yellow card) 66' (yellow-red card)	Attendance: 24,000; Referee: Stephan Kammerer (Karlsruhe)

26 September 1999 2. Bundesliga	Tennis Borussia Berlin	1–0	Rot-Weiß Oberhausen	Mommsenstadion, Berlin
15:00	Ouakili 2'; Hilfiker (yellow card) Ouakili (yellow card) Rösler (yellow card) Suchopárek (yellow card)	Report	Scheinhardt (yellow card) Vier (yellow card)	Attendance: 3,200; Referee: Markus Schmidt (Stuttgart)

3 October 1999 2. Bundesliga	SpVgg Greuther Fürth	2–0	Tennis Borussia Berlin	Ronhof-Stadion, Fürth
15:00	Reichel 14'; Walther 33'; Azzouzi (yellow card) Reichel (yellow card) Walther (yellow card)	Report	Copado (yellow card) Kozák (yellow card) Ouakili (yellow card); Akrapović (yellow card) 63' (yellow-red card)	Attendance: 6,400; Referee: Jürgen Kreyer (Hilden)

13 October 1999 DFB-Pokal – R3	Tennis Borussia Berlin	2–3 (a.e.t.)	Hertha BSC	Olympiastadion, Berlin
20:30	Rösler 4'; Walker 68'; Akrapović (yellow card) Brinkmann (yellow card) Copado (yellow card) Ouakili (yellow card)	Report	Sanneh 35'; Dárdai 56'; Aračić 94'; Konstantinidis (yellow card) Michalke (yellow card) Wosz (yellow card)	Attendance: 23,300; Referee: Hartmut Strampe (Handorf)

17 October 1999 2. Bundesliga	Tennis Borussia Berlin	2–0	Stuttgarter Kickers	Mommsenstadion, Berlin
15:00	Ćirić 58'; Hamann 64'; Kapagiannidis (yellow card) Kozák (yellow card)	Report	Malchow (yellow card); Cássio (red card) 40'	Attendance: 2,500; Referee: Dirk Margenberg (Wermelskirchen)

24 October 1999 2. Bundesliga	VfL Bochum	2–6	Tennis Borussia Berlin	Ruhrstadion, Bochum
15:00	Weber 29'; Peschel 72'; Baştürk (yellow card) Sundermann (yellow card)	Report	Rösler 1', 85', 90'; Tredup 38'; Kiriakov 41'; Copado 57'; Hamann (yellow card)	Attendance: 10,000; Referee: Edgar Steinborn (Sinzig)

30 October 1999 2. Bundesliga	Tennis Borussia Berlin	1–3	FC Energie Cottbus	Mommsenstadion, Berlin
15:30	Rösler 18'; Copado (yellow card) Hamann (yellow card) Szewczyk (yellow card) Walker (yellow card); Rösler (red card) 28'	Report	Latoundji 81'; Beeck 83'; Miriuţă 90'; Franklin (yellow card) Jesse (yellow card) Labak (yellow card) Schröder (yellow card) Vata (yellow card)	Attendance: 9,600; Referee: Stefan Trautmann (Bodenwerder)

8 November 1999 2. Bundesliga	Tennis Borussia Berlin	2–2	Borussia Mönchengladbach	Mommsenstadion, Berlin
20:15	Suchopárek 6'; Ouakili 65'; Ouakili (yellow card)	Report	van Lent 5', 50'; Burić (yellow card) Eberl (yellow card) Grebenoschko (yellow card) Korzynietz (yellow card)	Attendance: 5,100; Referee: Bernd Hauer (Celle)

19 November 1999 2. Bundesliga	SV Waldhof Mannheim	0–0	Tennis Borussia Berlin	Carl-Benz-Stadion, Mannheim
18:00	Cissé (yellow card) Rehm (yellow card) Santos (yellow card)	Report	Hamann (yellow card) Kozák (yellow card) Suchopárek (yellow card)	Attendance: 6,000; Referee: Herbert Fandel (Kyllburg)

28 November 1999 2. Bundesliga	Tennis Borussia Berlin	0–0	Kickers Offenbach	Mommsenstadion, Berlin
15:00	Akrapović (yellow card)	Report		Attendance: 3,300; Referee: Thomas Frank (Hanover)

5 December 1999 2. Bundesliga	SC Fortuna Köln	0–0	Tennis Borussia Berlin	Südstadion, Cologne
15:00	Cichon (yellow card) Dragóner (yellow card) Tavčar (yellow card)	Report	Copado (yellow card) Rösler (yellow card) Walker (yellow card); Kozák (yellow card) 43' (yellow-red card) Tredup (red card) 77'	Attendance: 800; Referee: Michael Weiner (Giesen)

10 December 1999 2. Bundesliga	Tennis Borussia Berlin	2–1	1. FSV Mainz 05	Mommsenstadion, Berlin
19:00	Rösler 39'; Kramny 67' (o.g.); Brinkmann (yellow card) Ćirić (yellow card) Kiriakov (yellow card) Weiland (yellow card) Szewczyk (yellow card)	Report	Policella 66'; Dinmohammadi (yellow card) Herzberger (yellow card) Hock (yellow card); Policella (yellow card) Ratkowski (yellow card) Schierenberg (yellow card)	Attendance: 2,300; Referee: Detlef Scheppe (Wenden)

14 December 1999 2. Bundesliga	1. FC Nürnberg	2–0	Tennis Borussia Berlin	Frankenstadion, Nuremberg
19:00	Leitl 4'; Driller 65'; Beliakov (yellow card) Kos (yellow card) Leitl (yellow card)	Report	Weiland (yellow card) Walker (yellow card)	Attendance: 10,500; Referee: Knut Kircher (Rottenburg am Neckar)

17 December 1999 2. Bundesliga	Tennis Borussia Berlin	0–0	Chemnitzer FC	Mommsenstadion, Berlin
19:00	Suchopárek (yellow card)	Report	Bittermann (yellow card) Jendrossek (yellow card) Tetzner (yellow card)	Attendance: 2,300; Referee: Detlef Schütz (Norken)

13 February 2000 2. Bundesliga	Tennis Borussia Berlin	2–1	Hannover 96	Olympiastadion, Berlin
15:00	Ćirić 11', 56'; Ouakili (yellow card) Šakiri (yellow card)	Report	Bounoua 86'; Stendel (yellow card) Tumani (yellow card)	Attendance: 3,900; Referee: Burkhard Hufgard (Mömbris)

20 February 2000 2. Bundesliga	Karlsruher SC	0–0	Tennis Borussia Berlin	Wildparkstadion, Karlsruhe
15:00	Edman (yellow card)	Report	Akrapović (yellow card)	Attendance: 13,400; Referee: Bernd Hauer (Celle)

25 February 2000 2. Bundesliga	Tennis Borussia Berlin	1–2	Alemannia Aachen	Olympiastadion, Berlin
19:00	Ćirić 28'; Brinkmann (yellow card) Tredup (yellow card) Walker (yellow card); Kozák (red card) 76'	Report	Xie 68'; Lämmermann 76' (pen.); Bashi (yellow card) Kapič (yellow card) Rauw (yellow card)	Attendance: 2,800; Referee: Stephan Kammerer (Karlsruhe)

5 March 2000 2. Bundesliga	FC St. Pauli	1–1	Tennis Borussia Berlin	Millerntor-Stadion, Hamburg
14:45	Klasnić 51' (pen.)	Report	Ouakili 18'; Weiland (yellow card) Walker (yellow card)	Attendance: 11,800; Referee: Peter Sippel (Munich)

13 March 2000 2. Bundesliga	Tennis Borussia Berlin	2–0	1. FC Köln	Mommsenstadion, Berlin
20:15	Kiriakov 5'; Ćirić 16'; Brinkmann (yellow card) Ouakili (yellow card) Walker (yellow card); Suchopárek (red card) 18'	Report	Voigt (yellow card)	Attendance: 4,600; Referee: Ralf Hilmes (Nordhorn)

19 March 2000 2. Bundesliga	Rot-Weiß Oberhausen	3–0	Tennis Borussia Berlin	Niederrheinstadion, Oberhausen
15:00	Vier 55'; Luginger 76'; Lipinski 90' (pen.); Backhaus (yellow card) Judt (yellow card) Obad (yellow card) Scheinhardt (yellow card)	Report	Boban (yellow card) Ćirić (yellow card) Kiriakov (yellow card); Rösler (yellow card) Šakiri (yellow card) Tredup (yellow card); Brinkmann (red card) 90'	Attendance: 3,600; Referee: Günter Perl (Munich)

24 March 2000 2. Bundesliga	Tennis Borussia Berlin	3–1	SpVgg Greuther Fürth	Mommsenstadion, Berlin
19:00	Ouakili 56'; Ćirić 69'; Tiffert 88'; Ćirić (yellow card) Ouakili (yellow card) Tredup (yellow card)	Report	Türr 81'; Meichelbeck (yellow card)	Attendance: 2,200; Referee: Michael Weiner (Giesen)

31 March 2000 2. Bundesliga	Stuttgarter Kickers	2–0	Tennis Borussia Berlin	Waldau-Stadion, Stuttgart
19:00	Marić 90'; Blessin 90'; Cássio (yellow card) Marić (yellow card) Özkan (yellow card) Raspe (yellow card)	Report	Brinkmann (yellow card) Kiriakov (yellow card) Kozák (yellow card) Suchopárek (yellow card); Görtz (red card) 63'	Attendance: 4,800; Referee: Detlef Schütz (Norken)

10 April 2000 2. Bundesliga	Tennis Borussia Berlin	0–4	VfL Bochum	Olympiastadion, Berlin
20:15	Kiriakov (yellow card) Walker (yellow card); Melzig (yellow card) 55' (yellow-red card)	Report	Ristau 48'; Müller 61'; Peschel 64'; Marić 69'; Baştürk (yellow card)	Attendance: 3,200; Referee: Knut Kircher (Rottenburg am Neckar)

15 April 2000 2. Bundesliga	FC Energie Cottbus	2–0	Tennis Borussia Berlin	Stadion der Freundschaft, Cottbus
15:30	Rödlund 28'; Hilfiker 54' (o.g.); Beeck (yellow card) Franklin (yellow card) Labak (yellow card) Renn (yellow card)	Report	Copado (yellow card) Weiland (yellow card) Šakiri (yellow card)	Attendance: 10,900; Referee: Christian Schößling (Leipzig)

22 April 2000 2. Bundesliga	Borussia Mönchengladbach	4–2	Tennis Borussia Berlin	Bökelbergstadion, Mönchengladbach
15:30	Ašanin 27', 58' van Lent 67', 77'; Eberl (yellow card) Korzynietz (yellow card)	Report	Tiffert 14'; Ćirić 65'; Walker (yellow card)	Attendance: 30,800; Referee: Bernd Heynemann (Magdeburg)

29 April 2000 2. Bundesliga	Tennis Borussia Berlin	3–1	SV Waldhof Mannheim	Olympiastadion, Berlin
15:30	Ćirić 56', 66'; Rösler 84'; Rösler (yellow card)	Report	Licht 90'; Boukadida (yellow card)	Attendance: 2,100; Referee: Volker Wezel (Tübingen)

7 May 2000 2. Bundesliga	Kickers Offenbach	2–1	Tennis Borussia Berlin	Stadion am Bieberer Berg, Offenbach am Main
15:00	Becker 13'; O. Roth 89'; Becker (yellow card) Binz (yellow card) Maier (yellow card) D. Roth (yellow card) Sohler (yellow card)	Report	Ouakili 89'; Brinkmann (yellow card) Hilfiker (yellow card) Ouakili (yellow card)	Attendance: 10,500; Referee: Dirk Margenberg (Wermelskirchen)

12 May 2000 2. Bundesliga	Tennis Borussia Berlin	1–2	SC Fortuna Köln	Olympiastadion, Berlin
19:00	Ćirić 59'; Kozák (yellow card) Walker (yellow card)	Report	Ibrahim 25', 70'; Bobel (yellow card) Dragóner (yellow card)	Attendance: 1,400; Referee: Dirk Margenberg (Wermelskirchen)

18 May 2000 2. Bundesliga	1. FSV Mainz 05	2–1	Tennis Borussia Berlin	Stadion am Bruchweg, Mainz
19:00	Klopp 38'; Marcio 87'; Policella (yellow card)	Report	Ouakili 29'; Hilfiker (yellow card) Walker (yellow card) Tredup (yellow card) 90'; Kiriakov (red card) 55'	Attendance: 7,400; Referee: Frank Gettke (Haltern)

21 May 2000 2. Bundesliga	Tennis Borussia Berlin	1–3	1. FC Nürnberg	Olympiastadion, Berlin
15:00	Walker 67'	Report	Driller 8'; Nikl 41'; Hobsch 50'	Attendance: 2,600; Referee: Florian Meyer (Burgdorf)

26 May 2000 2. Bundesliga	Chemnitzer FC	1–0	Tennis Borussia Berlin	Stadion an der Gellertstraße, Chemnitz
19:00	Skela 14'; König (yellow card) Oswald (yellow card)	Report	Aksoy (yellow card) Benthin (yellow card) Tiffert (yellow card)	Attendance: 12,600; Referee: Ralf Hilmes (Nordhorn)

== Player statistics ==
Pos	Player	Apps	Goals	Apps	Goals	Apps	Goals
Pos	Player	2. Bundesliga		DFB-Pokal		Total	
MF	(Federal Republic of Yugoslavia) Duško Adamović	1	0	0	0	1	0
MF	(Bosnia and Herzegovina) Bruno Akrapović	18	0	2	0	20	0
DF	(Turkey) Taşkın Aksoy	1	0	0	0	1	0
DF	(Germany) Manuel Benthin	4	0	0	0	4	0
MF	(Croatia) Tonči Boban	4	0	0	0	4	0
GK	(Germany) Thaddäus Bohne	2	0	0	0	2	0
DF	(Germany) Ansgar Brinkmann	29	1	2	0	31	1
DF	(Turkey) Müslüm Can	3	0	1	0	4	0
FW	(North Macedonia) Saša Ćirić	32	14	2	2	34	16
FW	(Spain) Francisco Copado	21	2	2	0	23	2
GK	(Germany) Nico Creutzmann	1	0	0	0	1	0
GK	(Germany) Roman Görtz	2	0	0	0	2	0
DF	(Germany) Matthias Hamann	25	1	2	0	27	1
GK	(Switzerland) Andreas Hilfiker	32	0	2	0	34	0
DF	(Germany) Olaf Kapagiannidis	7	0	0	0	7	0
MF	(Germany) Enrico Kern	7	0	0	0	7	0
FW	(Russia) Sergei Kiriakov	28	3	2	0	30	3
MF	(Turkey) Celaleddin Koçak	3	0	1	0	4	0
MF	(Slovakia) Ivan Kozák	30	0	2	0	32	0
FW	(Germany) Mike Lünsmann	5	0	0	0	5	0
DF	(Germany) Jens Melzig	16	0	0	0	16	0
MF	(Morocco) Abderrahim Ouakili	25	7	2	0	27	7
FW	(Germany) Uwe Rösler	28	6	2	3	30	9
MF	(North Macedonia) Artim Šakiri	14	0	0	0	14	0
DF	(Czech Republic) Jan Suchopárek	23	1	2	0	25	1
MF	(Poland) Zbigniew Szewczyk	20	0	0	0	20	0
DF	(Germany) Ifet Taljević	1	0	0	0	1	0
FW	(Germany) Christian Tiffert	8	2	0	0	8	2
DF	(Germany) Marko Tredup	29	1	2	0	31	1
DF	(Switzerland) Marco Walker	32	3	2	1	34	4
MF	(Germany) Niclas Weiland	17	0	0	0	17	0

== Final league position – 13th ==
Pos	Team	Pld	W	D	L	GF	GA	GD	Pts	Promotion or relegation
14	Stuttgarter Kickers	34	10	9	15	49	58	−9	39	
15	Fortuna Köln (R)	34	8	11	15	38	50	−12	35	Relegation to Regionalliga (Note: Fortuna Köln and Tennis Borussia Berlin were relegated to the Regionalliga Nord. Karlsruher SC and Kickers Offenbach were relegated to the Regionalliga Süd.)
16	Kickers Offenbach (R)	34	8	11	15	35	58	−23	35	Relegation to Regionalliga
17	Karlsruher SC (R)	34	5	12	17	35	56	−21	27	Relegation to Regionalliga
18	Tennis Borussia Berlin (Note: Tennis Borussia Berlin had their license revoked. Under paragraph 41 of the DFB regulations, Tennis Borussia Berlin were placed last.) (R)	34	10	10	14	42	50	−8	40	Relegation to Regionalliga

Source: Bundesliga.de
Rules for classification: 1) points; 2) goal difference; 3) number of goals scored.
(R) Relegated
