= 2009–10 1. FC Union Berlin season =

German football team's 2. Bundesliga season

1. FC Union Berlin
2009–10 season
- Chairman: Dirk Zingler
- Manager: Uwe Neuhaus
- 2. Bundesliga: 12th
- DFB-Pokal: First round
- Top goalscorer: League: Mosquera (6); All: Mosquera (6)
- Highest home attendance: 18,955 (vs Werder Bremen)
Home colours	Away colours

For the 2009–10 season, 1. FC Union Berlin competed in the 2. Bundesliga.

== Transfers ==
=== Summer transfers ===
In: Note: Flags indicate national team as defined under FIFA eligibility rules; some limited exceptions apply. Players may hold more than one non-FIFA nationality.

No.	Pos.	Nation	Player
3	MF	GER	Dominic Peitz (from VfL Osnabrück)
6	DF	BEL	Bernd Rauw (from Kickers Emden)
9	FW	COL	John Mosquera (on loan from SV Werder Bremen)
13	GK	GER	Christoph Haker (from 1. FC Union Berlin Youth)
23	MF	GER	Björn Brunnemann (from FC St. Pauli)

Out: Note: Flags indicate national team as defined under FIFA eligibility rules; some limited exceptions apply. Players may hold more than one non-FIFA nationality.

No.	Pos.	Nation	Player
3	DF	GER	Mischa Welm (to SpVgg Weiden)
6	MF	GER	Ludwig Lippold (released)
9	FW	GER	Dustin Heun (to 1. FC Kaiserslautern II)
11	MF	TUR	Erdal Bastürk (to Tennis Borussia Berlin)
13	GK	GER	Eric Niendorf (to 1. FC Union Berlin II)
14	MF	GER	Sebastian Bönig (to FC Erding)
19	FW	GER	Nico Patschinski (to BFC Dynamo)
20	MF	GER	Kevin Maek (to Werder Bremen II)

=== Winter transfers ===
In: Note: Flags indicate national team as defined under FIFA eligibility rules; some limited exceptions apply. Players may hold more than one non-FIFA nationality.

No.	Pos.	Nation	Player
--	MF	GER	Paul Thomik (free agent)
--	FW	GER	Chinedu Ede (from MSV Duisburg)

Out: Note: Flags indicate national team as defined under FIFA eligibility rules; some limited exceptions apply. Players may hold more than one non-FIFA nationality.

No.	Pos.	Nation	Player

== Players ==
=== Appearances and goals ===
Appearance and goalscoring records for all the players who are in the Union Berlin first team squad during the 2009–10 season.

No.	Pos	Nat	Player	Total		2. Bundesliga		DFB-Pokal	
No.	Pos	Nat	Player	Apps	Goals	Apps	Goals	Apps	Goals
1	GK	(Germany) GER	Jan Glinker	20	0	19	0	1	0
3	MF	(Germany) GER	Dominic Peitz	5	1	4	1	1	0
4	MF	(Germany) GER	Marco Gebhardt	17	0	16	0	1	0
5	DF	(Germany) GER	Christian Stuff	16	1	16	1	0	0
6	DF	(Belgium) BEL	Bernd Rauw	16	0	15	0	1	0
7	DF	(Republic of Ireland) IRL	Patrick Kohlmann	18	0	18	0	0	0
8	MF	(Republic of the Congo) CGO	Macchambes Younga-Mouhani	19	0	18	0	1	0
9	FW	(Colombia) COL	John Jairo Mosquera	16	7	15	7	1	0
10	MF	(Germany) GER	Hüzeyfe Dogan	14	0	13	0	1	0
11	FW	(Turkey) TUR	Kenan Şahin	18	5	17	5	1	0
13	GK	(Germany) GER	Christoph Haker	0	0	0	0	0	0
14	MF	(Germany) GER	Paul Thomik	2	0	2	0	0	0
15	DF	(Germany) GER	Daniel Göhlert	20	0	19	0	1	0
16	DF	(Germany) GER	Christoph Menz	3	0	3	0	0	0
17	MF	(Germany) GER	Torsten Mattuschka	19	6	19	6	0	0
18	DF	(Germany) GER	Daniel Schulz	4	0	3	0	1	0
19	FW	(Germany) GER	Chinedu Ede	2	0	2	0	0	0
20	MF	(Germany) GER	David Hollwitz	0	0	0	0	0	0
21	FW	(Germany) GER	Steven Jahn	0	0	0	0	0	0
22	FW	(Germany) GER	Karim Benyamina	15	4	14	4	1	0
23	MF	(Germany) GER	Björn Brunnemann	12	1	11	1	1	0
24	MF	(Germany) GER	Michael Bemben	13	0	12	0	1	0
25	MF	(Croatia) CRO	Adrian Antunović	0	0	0	0	0	0
27	GK	(Germany) GER	Carsten Busch	0	0	0	0	0	0
28	FW	(Germany) GER	Shergo Biran	7	1	7	1	0	0
29	DF	(Germany) GER	Michael Parensen	17	0	16	0	1	0

== Match details ==
=== 2. Bundesliga ===
Win Draw Loss

2. Bundesliga match details
Match	Date	Opponent	Venue	Result F–A	Scorers	Attendance	Ref.
1	7 August 2009	Rot-Weiß Oberhausen	A	3–0	Mosquera 42', Benyamina 65', Mattuschka 67'	5,895	
2	15 August 2009	Fortuna Düsseldorf	H	1–0	Şahin 76'	12,344	
3	21 August 2009	Hansa Rostock	H	1–0	Mosquera 33'	17,500	
4	30 August 2009	FC Augsburg	A	1–1	Şahin 59'	19,037	
5	13 September 2009	SC Paderborn	H	5–4	Mosquera (2) 9', 24', Benyamina (2) 13', 47', Şahin 89'	13,162	
6	18 September 2009	TuS Koblenz	A	1–1	Mattuschka 78'	7,041	
7	25 September 2009	Rot Weiss Ahlen	H	2–1	Mattuschka 24', Benyamina 42'	12,212	
8	2 October 2009	MSV Duisburg	A	1–3	Biran 82'	12,017	
9	19 October 2009	Greuther Fürth	H	1–2	Şahin 57'	14,150	
10	25 October 2009	Alemannia Aachen	A	4–1	Mattuschka 34', Mosquera (2) 44', 90', Stuff 79'	26,050	
11	30 October 2009	FSV Frankfurt	H	1–0	Dogan 37'	13,519	
12	8 November 2009	Karlsruher SC	A	2–3	Mattuschka 49' (pen.), Şahin 71'	17,235	
13	22 November 2009	1. FC Kaiserslautern	H	0–2		19,000	
14	29 November 2009	FC St. Pauli	A	0–3		19,901	
15	4 December 2009	Energie Cottbus	H	1–1	Mattuschka 25'	18,212	
16	13 December 2009	Arminia Bielefeld	A	1–1	Peitz 76'	16,900	
17	20 December 2009	1860 Munich	H	1–1	Brunnemann 11'	15,467	
18	15 January 2010	Rot-Weiß Oberhausen	H	1–0	Mosquera 60'	9,118	
19	22 January 2010	Fortuna Düsseldorf	A	0–1		25,300	
21	6 February 2010	FC Augsburg	H	0–0		12,168	
22	12 February 2010	SC Paderborn	A	0–3		5,237	
23	19 February 2010	TuS Koblenz	H	3–2	Doğan (2) 10', 28', Stuff 59'	10,046	
20	24 February 2010	Hansa Rostock	A	0–0		17,000	
24	28 February 2010	Rot Weiss Ahlen	A	2–3	Mattuschka 45+3' (pen.), Doğan 90+1'	3,820	
25	7 March 2010	MSV Duisburg	H	0–1		13,357	
26	12 March 2010	Greuther Fürth	A	0–0		5,450	
27	21 March 2010	Alemannia Aachen	H	0–0		12,057	
28	28 March 2010	FSV Frankfurt	A	1–2	Benyamina 3'	3,542	
29	3 April 2010	Karlsruher SC	H	1–1	Mattuschka 10' (pen.)	12,670	
30	10 April 2010	1. FC Kaiserslautern	A	1–1	Lakić 80' (o.g.)	41,144	
31	17 April 2010	FC St. Pauli	H	2–1	Mattuschka 10', Benyamina 87'	19,000	
32	26 April 2010	Energie Cottbus	A	2–4	Peitz 35', Mattuschka 86' (pen.)	15,140	
33	2 May 2010	Arminia Bielefeld	H	3–0	Brunnemann 16', 58', Doğan 90+1'	17,024	
34	9 May 2010	1860 Munich	A	0–2		26,000	

=== League table ===
Pos	Team	Pld	W	D	L	GF	GA	GD	Pts
10	Karlsruher SC	34	13	7	14	43	45	−2	46
11	Greuther Fürth	34	12	8	14	51	50	+1	44
12	Union Berlin	34	11	11	12	42	45	−3	44
13	Alemannia Aachen	34	11	10	13	37	41	−4	43
14	Rot-Weiß Oberhausen	34	12	5	17	38	52	−14	41

Source: Bundesliga.de
Rules for classification: 1) points; 2) goal difference; 3) number of goals scored.

=== DFB-Pokal ===
Win Draw Loss

DFB-Pokal match details
Round	Date	Opponent	Venue	Result F–A	Scorers	Attendance	Ref.
First round	2 August 2009	Werder Bremen	H	0–5		18,955	
