= 2004–05 FC Energie Cottbus season =

FC Energie Cottbus
2004–05 season
- Manager: Petrik Sander
- Stadium: Stadion der Freundschaft
- 2. Bundesliga: 14th
- DFB-Pokal: Second round

During the 2004–05 German football season, FC Energie Cottbus competed in the 2. Bundesliga.

== Season summary ==
Energie escaped relegation to the 3. Liga by the slimmest of margins, with their goal difference only 1 goal greater than 15th-placed Eintracht Trier.

== First-team squad ==
Squad at end of season

Note: Flags indicate national team as defined under FIFA eligibility rules; some limited exceptions apply. Players may hold more than one non-FIFA nationality.

No.	Pos.	Nation	Player
1	GK	GER	André Thoms
3	DF	GER	Christian Beeck
4	DF	GER	Rayk Schröder
5	DF	USA	Gregg Berhalter
6	DF	BRA	Vragel da Silva
7	FW	NZL	Brent Fisher
8	MF	NGA	Adebowale Ogungbure
9	FW	GER	Steffen Baumgart
10	MF	MAR	Youssef Mokhtari
11	MF	GER	Timo Rost
12	GK	GER	Gunnar Berntsen
13	DF	HUN	Zsolt Lőw
14	DF	HUN	Zoltán Szélesi
15	MF	GER	Lars Jungnickel
16	MF	BEN	Moussa Latoundji
17	DF	HUN	Norbert Mészáros
18	MF	GER	Björn Brunnemann
19	DF	GER	Benjamin Schöckel

No.	Pos.	Nation	Player
20	DF	ROU	Adrian Iordache
21	MF	POL	Tomasz Bandrowski
22	FW	TUR	Kenan Şahin (Note: Şahin was born in Cologne, West Germany (now Germany), but also qualified to represent Turkey internationally and made his debut for the U-21 team in 2004.)
23	GK	BIH	Tomislav Piplica
24	MF	GER	Toni Lempke
25	DF	CZE	Martin Hyský
26	MF	GER	Sebastian Schuppan
27	MF	GER	Daniel Gunkel
28	DF	GER	Marco Winkler
29	DF	GHA	Sebastian Nuhs
30	MF	GER	Romano Lindner
31	DF	GER	Patrick Jahn
32	MF	GER	Tom Schikora
33	FW	GER	Daniel Frahn
34	MF	GER	Torsten Mattuschka
35	MF	GER	Marcus Dörry
36	MF	BIH	Damir Suljanovic

=== Left club during season ===
Note: Flags indicate national team as defined under FIFA eligibility rules; some limited exceptions apply. Players may hold more than one non-FIFA nationality.

No.	Pos.	Nation	Player
2	DF	GER	Ronny Nikol (released)
7	MF	ROU	Laurentiu-Aurelian Reghecampf (to Alemannia Aachen)
22	FW	GER	Michael Thurk (to Mainz 05)

No.	Pos.	Nation	Player
26	DF	GER	Kevin Meinhardt (demoted to second team)
30	FW	GER	Stefan Wollermann (to Budissa Bautzen)
