= Zsolt Lőw =

Hungarian footballer (born 1979)

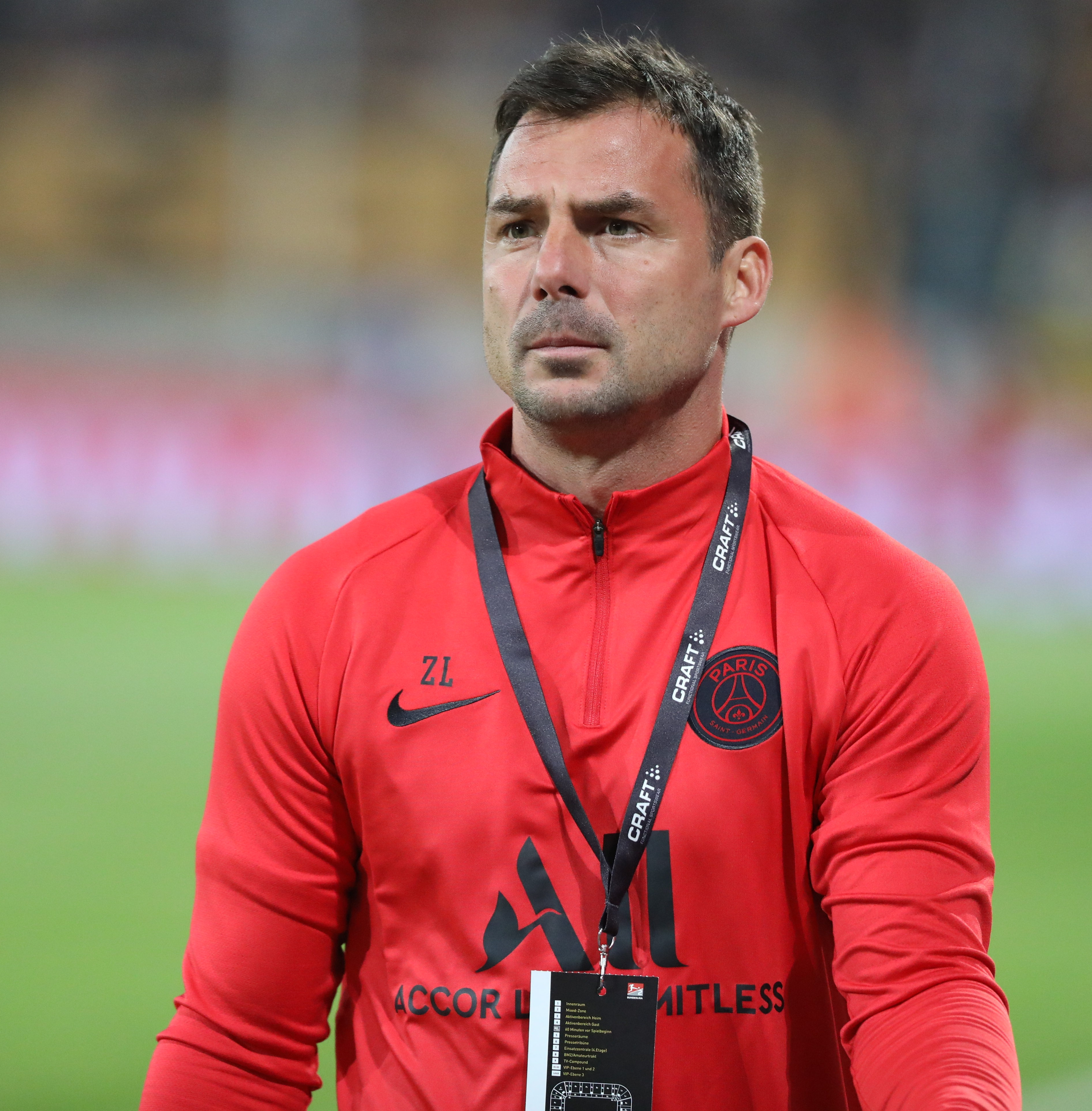
- Lőw with Paris Saint-Germain in 2019

Personal information
- Full name: Zsolt Lőw
- Date of birth: 29 April 1979 (age 47)
- Place of birth: Budapest, Hungary
- Height: 1.83 m (6 ft 0 in)
- Position: Left back

Youth career
- Újpest

Senior career*
Years	Team	Apps	(Gls)
1998–2002	Újpest	97	(6)
2002–2005	Energie Cottbus	79	(5)
2005–2006	Hansa Rostock	11	(0)
2006–2008	TSG Hoffenheim	39	(0)
2009–2011	Mainz 05	29	(0)
2010–2011	→ Mainz 05 II	4	(0)
Total		259	(11)

International career
1999–2000	Hungary U-21	3	(0)
2002–2008	Hungary	25	(1)

Managerial career
- 2025: RB Leipzig (interim)
- * Club domestic league appearances and goals

Zsolt Lőw (born 29 April 1979) is a Hungarian professional football coach and former player.

He previously served as an assistant manager at Bundesliga club Bayern Munich under Thomas Tuchel, whom he also assisted at Chelsea and Paris Saint Germain.

== Playing career ==
In his playing career, Lőw played for Újpest, Energie Cottbus, Hansa Rostock, Hoffenheim, and Mainz 05 from 2009 until 2011, under coach Thomas Tuchel.

== Coaching career ==
Lőw started his coaching career a year later, in 2012, as assistant coach of Peter Zeidler at Red Bull Salzburg's farm team FC Liefering. When Adi Hütter joined Salzburg as coach in 2014, Lőw became his assistant until Hütter left for Bern. Salzburg won the Austrian double with the 2014–15 Austrian Football Bundesliga, and 2014–15 Austrian Cup. Lőw, at the same time, joined RB Leipzig, as one of the assistants to Ralf Rangnick. When Leipzig was promoted to the Bundesliga, Rangnick stopped being coach and hired Ralph Hasenhüttl as coach who continued to work with Lőw as his assistant. Leipzig finished as runner up in 2016–17 Bundesliga. The following season Leipzig dropped out of the Champions League and continued in the Europa League. After beating heavyweights Napoli and Zenit Saint Petersburg, they lost against Marseille in the quarter-finals.

In July 2018, when Hasenhüttl decided to leave Leipzig, Lőw left to join Thomas Tuchel as an assistant at Paris Saint Germain.

In December 2020, PSG sporting director Leonardo terminated Tuchel's contract. Tuchel's staff, including Lőw, were let go as well. Lőw went with Tuchel when the German was hired by Premier League club Chelsea the following month. He was in charge of Chelsea's Club World Cup semi-final as Tuchel was isolating after a positive COVID-19 test.

Lőw left Chelsea after Tuchel was dismissed as head coach. In March 2023, shortly after the latter had been appointed head coach of Bayern Munich, Lőw joined him as an assistant. Later that year, on 20 September, he managed Bayern's Champions League opening match against Manchester United, leading the team to a 4–3 victory in the absence of head coach Tuchel, who was suspended.

=== Leipzig ===
In March 2025, he was named the new interim head coach of RB Leipzig, until the end of the season. His debut ended with a 3–1 defeat against VfB Stuttgart in the 2024–25 DFB-Pokal on 2 April 2025. He debuted in the 2024–25 Bundesliga with a 3–1 victory over TSG Hoffenheim at the Red Bull Arena on 5 April 2025. On 4 May 2025, Leipzig drew with FC Bayern Munich (3–3). In an interview with Nemzeti Sport, Lőw said that he would have been happy with a draw before the match.

In an interview published in Kicker, Péter Gulácsi goalkeeper of Leipzig and Hungarian national football team, praised Lőw for bringing new energy into the team.

He was elected to be a member of the presidency of the Hungarian Football Federation on 9 May 2025.

== Career statistics ==
Club	Season	League			DFB-Pokal		Continental		Total	
Club	Season	Division	Apps	Goals	Apps	Goals	Apps	Goals	Apps	Goals
Újpest	1998–99	Nemzeti Bajnokság I	2	0			1 (Note: Appearance in UEFA Cup)	0	3	0
Újpest	1999–2000	Nemzeti Bajnokság I	30	0			1	0	31	0
Újpest	2000–01	Nemzeti Bajnokság I	28	1			–		28	1
Újpest	2001–02	Nemzeti Bajnokság I	37	5			–		37	5
Újpest	Total		97	6			2	0	99	6
Energie Cottbus	2002–03	Bundesliga	31	0	2	0	–		33	0
Energie Cottbus	2003–04	2. Bundesliga	26	4	1	0	–		27	4
Energie Cottbus	2004–05	2. Bundesliga	22	1	2	0	–		24	1
Energie Cottbus	Total		79	5	5	0	–		84	5
Hansa Rostock	2005–06	2. Bundesliga	11	0	1	2	–		12	2
1899 Hoffenheim	2006–07	Regionalliga Süd	11	0	—		–		11	0
1899 Hoffenheim	2007–08	2. Bundesliga	27	0	4	0	–		31	0
1899 Hoffenheim	2008–09	Bundesliga	1	0	0	0	–		1	0
1899 Hoffenheim	Total		39	0	4	0	–		43	0
Mainz 05	2008–09	2. Bundesliga	14	0	1	0	–		15	0
Mainz 05	2009–10	Bundesliga	15	0	1	0	–		16	0
Mainz 05	2010–11	Bundesliga	0	0	0	0	–		0	0
Mainz 05	Total		29	0	2	0	–		31	0
Career total			255	11	12	2	2	0	269	13

=== Managerial ===
As of As of 17 May 2025

Team	From	To	Record				
Team	From	To	G	W	D	L	Win %
RB Leipzig (interim)	30 March 2025	30 June 2025	8	2	3	3	25.00
Total			8	2	3	3	25.00

== Honours ==
=== Player ===
Újpest

- Magyar Kupa: 2001–02
- Szuperkupa: 2002

1899 Hoffenheim

- 2. Bundesliga runner-up: 2007–08
- Regionalliga runner-up: 2006–07

Mainz 05

- 2. Bundesliga runner-up: 2008–09
