= Adam Cichon =

Polish-born German footballer

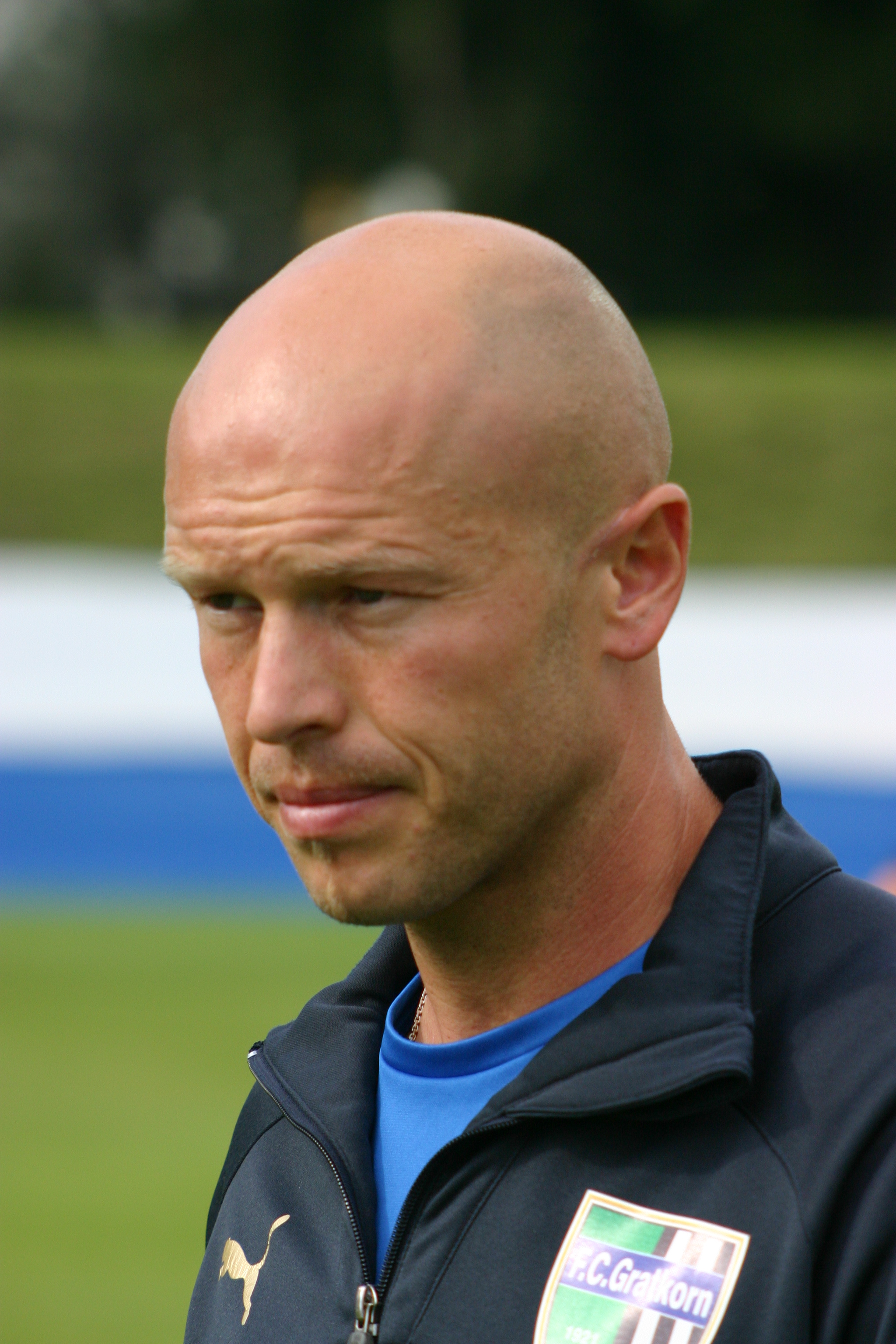
- Cichon with FC Gratkorn

Personal information
- Date of birth: 20 October 1975 (age 51)
- Place of birth: Lubliniec, Poland
- Height: 1.78 m (5 ft 10 in)
- Position: Midfielder

Senior career*
Years	Team	Apps	(Gls)
–1998	1. FC Köln	0	(0)
1998–2002	Fortuna Köln	50	(5)
2003–2004	Widzew Łódź	28	(3)
2004–2006	Polonia Warsaw	49	(5)
2007–2008	SV Bad Aussee	26	(5)
2008–2010	FC Gratkorn	58	(9)
Total		211	(27)
- * Club domestic league appearances and goals

Adam Cichon (born 20 October 1975) is a German-Polish former professional footballer who played as a midfielder.

== Career ==
After failing to make an appearance for German Bundesliga side 1. FC Köln, Cichon signed for Fortuna Köln in the second division. Despite being relegated with Fortuna to the third and fourth divisions, he signed for Polish Ekstraklasa club Widzew Łódź amid offers from the German second division. However, Cichon was criticized by fans as well as journalists upon arrival and never established himself as a starter for the team.

In 2008, after playing for another Polish top flight outfit, Polonia Warsaw, he signed for SV Bad Aussee in the Austrian lower leagues.
