= Roman Görtz =

German footballer (born 1974)

Personal information
- Full name: Roman Görtz
- Date of birth: 11 January 1974 (age 52)
- Place of birth: Berlin, Germany
- Height: 1.84 m (6 ft 0 in)
- Position: Goalkeeper

Senior career*
Years	Team	Apps	(Gls)
–1997	Reinickendorfer Füchse		
1999–2000	Tennis Borussia Berlin	3	(0)
2000–2001	FC Carl Zeiss Jena	19	(0)
2001	Reinickendorfer Füchse		
2001–2002	Berliner AK 07		
2002–2004	SV Yeşilyurt		
2004–2006	BFC Preussen	20	(0)
2006–2007	Hertha Zehlendorf		
- * Club domestic league appearances and goals

Roman Görtz (born 11 January 1974 in Berlin) is a retired German footballer.

Görtz made a total of three appearances in the 2. Bundesliga for Tennis Borussia Berlin.
