= Gustav Policella =

German football coach and former player (born 1975)

Personal information
- Date of birth: 14 September 1975 (age 51)
- Place of birth: Neustadt an der Weinstraße, West Germany
- Height: 1.86 m (6 ft 1 in)
- Position: Striker

Youth career
- 1. FC Kaiserslautern
- SG Mußbach
- Waldhof Mannheim

Senior career*
Years	Team	Apps	(Gls)
1993–1995	Waldhof Mannheim	8	(1)
1995–1996	Eintracht Trier	29	(13)
1996–2000	Mainz 05	71	(24)
1997	→ VfB Lübeck (loan)	14	(7)
1998	→ Rot-Weiß Oberhausen (loan)	14	(10)
2001–2002	MSV Duisburg	36	(7)
2002–2003	Greuther Fürth	25	(6)
2003–2004	Kickers Offenbach	27	(5)
2004–2005	Fortuna Düsseldorf	25	(8)
2005–2007	Wuppertaler SV	29	(8)
2008–2009	KFC Uerdingen 05	26	(6)
2009–2010	SC Hauenstein	1	(0)

Managerial career
- 2008–2009: KFC Uerdingen 05 (assistant)
- * Club domestic league appearances and goals

Gustav Policella (born 14 September 1975) is a German football coach and former player. He also holds Italian citizenship.
