= Gunnar Berntsen =

German footballer

Personal information
- Date of birth: 30 October 1977 (age 49)
- Place of birth: Frankfurt (Oder), East Germany
- Height: 1.92 m (6 ft 4 in)
- Position: Goalkeeper

Senior career*
| Years | Team | Apps | (Gls) |
| –2000 | FC Viktoria Frankfurt | | |
| 2000–2006 | FC Energie Cottbus | 18 | (0) |
- * Club domestic league appearances and goals

Gunnar Berntsen (born 30 October 1977 in Frankfurt (Oder), East Germany) is a retired German football player. He spent two seasons in the Bundesliga with FC Energie Cottbus.
