= Abderrahim Ouakili =

Moroccan footballer (1970–2023)

Personal information
- Date of birth: 12 December 1970
- Place of birth: Rabat, Morocco
- Date of death: 18 December 2023 (aged 53)
- Place of death: Germany
- Height: 1.81 m (5 ft 11 in)
- Position: Attacking midfielder

Youth career
- FUS Rabat

Senior career*
Years	Team	Apps	(Gls)
1992–1994	TGM SV Jügesheim		
1994–1997	Mainz 05	97	(27)
1997–1999	1860 Munich	40	(6)
1999–2000	Tennis Borussia Berlin	25	(7)
2001	Mainz 05	16	(5)
2001–2003	Skoda Xanthi	29	(14)
2003–2005	Karlsruher SC	45	(3)

International career
1996–1998	Morocco	11	(2)
- * Club domestic league appearances and goals

Abderrahim Ouakili (Arabic: عبد الرحيم الوكيلي; 12 December 1970 – 18 December 2023) was a Moroccan professional footballer who played as an attacking midfielder for several German teams, including Mainz 05, 1860 Munich, Tennis Borussia Berlin and Karlsruher SC while also having a spell with Skoda Xanthi in the Super League Greece.

Ouakili played for Morocco national team and was a participant at the 1998 FIFA World Cup. He died in Germany on 18 December 2023, at the age of 53.
