= Ifet Taljević =

German footballer (born 1980)

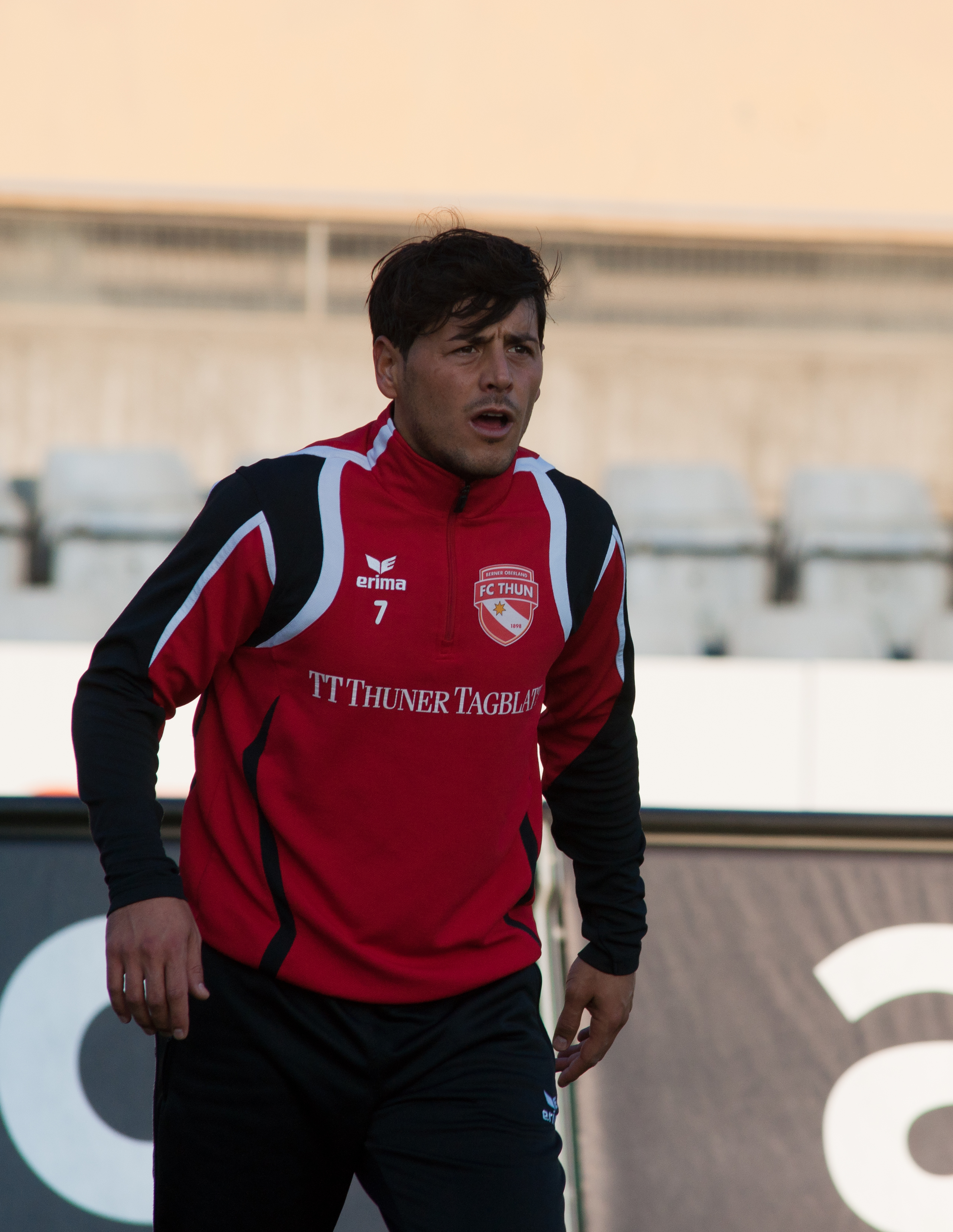
- Taljević in 2011

Personal information
- Full name: Ifet-Džamal Taljević
- Date of birth: 12 June 1980 (age 46)
- Place of birth: Novi Pazar, SFR Yugoslavia
- Height: 1.75 m (5 ft 9 in)
- Position: Midfielder

Youth career
- –1993: Hertha Zehlendorf
- 1993–2000: Tennis Borussia Berlin

Senior career*
Years	Team	Apps	(Gls)
2000–2001	Tennis Borussia Berlin	19	(2)
2001–2003	Hansa Rostock (A)	51	(9)
2003–2004	Chemnitzer FC	14	(1)
2004–2005	FC St. Pauli	15	(0)
2005–2007	FC Wil	43	(13)
2007–2008	Bellinzona	30	(10)
2008–2010	Neuchâtel Xamax	28	(5)
2010–2011	FC Thun	19	(5)
Total		219	(45)
- * Club domestic league appearances and goals

Ifet-Džamal Taljević (born 12 June 1980) is a German retired professional footballer who played as a midfielder.

== Career ==
Born in Novi Pazar, Taljević started his career at Tennis Borussia Berlin, where he played once during the 1999–2000 2. Bundesliga season. He spent several years playing in the Regionalliga with Tennis Borussia Berlin, Chemnitzer FC and FC St. Pauli, and two seasons at Oberliga with Hansa Rostock reserves.

Taljević then moved to Swiss Challenge League with FC Wil and then AC Bellinzona where he took the number 10 from Adrian Piț who left for A.S. Roma.
