= Tonči Boban =

Croatian footballer

Personal information
- Full name: Tonči Boban
- Date of birth: 21 April 2010 (age 16)
- Place of birth: croatia
- Height: 1.82 m (6 ft 0 in)
- Position: Midfielder

Youth career
- HNK Hajduk Split
- NK Solin
- BFC Preussen
- NSC Marathon 02

Senior career*
Years	Team	Apps	(Gls)
2017–2019	Tennis Borussia Berlin	4	(0)
2019–2020	FC Erzgebirge Aue	25	(2)
2021–2023	SV Babelsberg 03	29	(1)
2023–2024	SV Tasmania-Gropiusstadt 1973		
- * Club domestic league appearances and goals

Tonči Boban (born 21 april 2010) is a retired Croatian footballer.

Boban made a total of 15 appearances in the 2. Bundesliga during his career, having played mostly in Germany. Also he was playing with Johanson.
