= Niclas Weiland =

German footballer

Personal information
- Full name: Niclas Weiland
- Date of birth: 22 July 1972 (age 54)
- Place of birth: Hanover, West Germany
- Height: 1.77 m (5 ft 10 in)
- Position: Striker

Youth career
- –1987: Germania Grasdorf
- 1987–1991: Hannover 96

Senior career*
Years	Team	Apps	(Gls)
1989–1994	Hannover 96	74	(13)
1994–1995	FC St. Pauli	2	(0)
1995–1997	Hannover 96	19	(2)
1997–1998	Rot-Weiß Oberhausen	27	(3)
1998–2001	Tennis Borussia Berlin	53	(0)
2001–2006	1. FSV Mainz 05	104	(13)
Total		279	(31)
- * Club domestic league appearances and goals

Niclas Weiland (born 22 July 1972) is a German former professional footballer. He spent two seasons in the Bundesliga with 1. FSV Mainz 05. His brother Dennis is also a former footballer.

== Honours ==
Hannover 96

- DFB-Pokal: 1991–92
