= Adrian Antunović =

Croatian footballer

Personal information
- Date of birth: 24 April 1989 (age 37)
- Place of birth: Jajce, SR Bosnia and Herzegovina, SFR Yugoslavia
- Height: 1.80 m (5 ft 11 in)
- Position: Midfielder

Youth career
- 1996–2007: Union Berlin

Senior career*
Years	Team	Apps	(Gls)
2007–2011	Union Berlin II	10	(3)
2007–2011	Union Berlin	4	(0)
2011–2012	Lokomotiva Zagreb	2	(0)
2012–2015	Viktoria Berlin		
2015–2017	VSG Altglienicke		

International career
2007–2008	Croatia U19	8	(2)
- * Club domestic league appearances and goals

Adrian Antunović (born 24 April 1989) is a Croatian former professional footballer who played as a midfielder.

== Club career ==
Antunović began his career in 1996 with Union Berlin and was on 20 June 2007 promoted to the Regionalliga Nordost team. He made his debut for Union Berlin in the 3. Liga against Bayern Munich II and played 29 minutes.

== Personal life ==
Antunović was born in Jajce to Croatian parents, just before the breakup of Yugoslavia and the war. His parents and two aunts were killed on 24 December 2006 in Croatia.
