= Shergo Biran =

German footballer

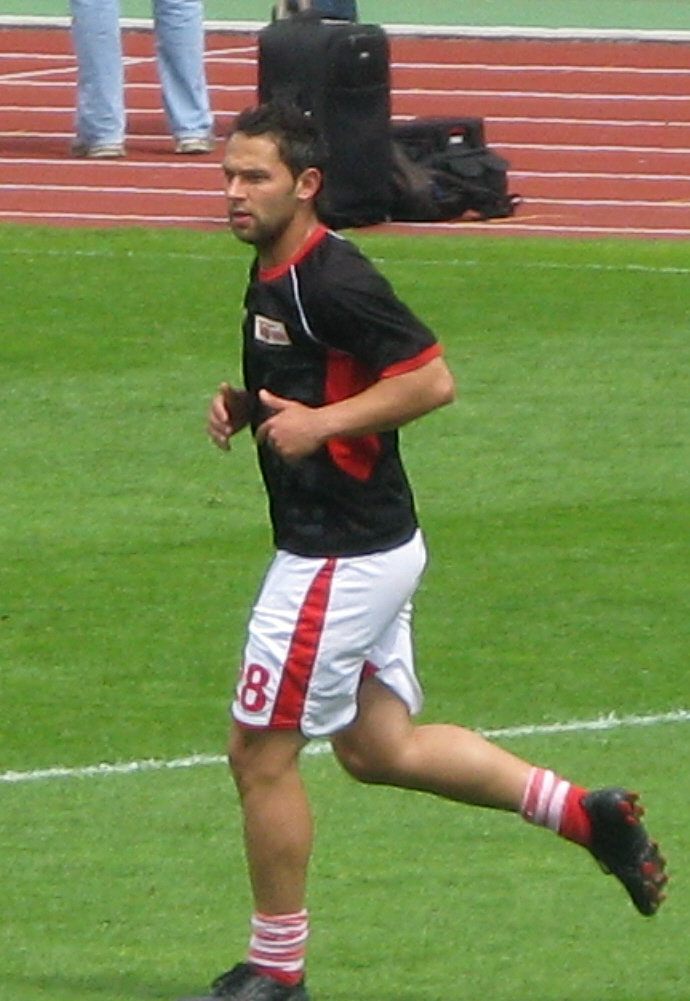
- Biran in 2009

Personal information
- Full name: Shergo Biran
- Date of birth: 4 January 1979 (age 47)
- Place of birth: West Berlin, West Germany
- Height: 1.77 m (5 ft 10 in)
- Position: Forward

Youth career
- 1984–1985: Wittenauer SC Concordia
- 1985–1992: 1. FC Lübars
- 1992–1994: BFC Preussen
- 1994–1995: 1. FC Lübars
- 1995–1996: FC Berlin
- 1996–1998: Reinickendorfer Füchse

Senior career*
| Years | Team | Apps | (Gls) |
| 1998–1999 | Reinickendorfer Füchse | 32 | (9) |
| 1999 | Tennis Borussia Berlin (A) | 1 | (0) |
| 2000–2001 | Reinickendorfer Füchse | 28 | (9) |
| 2001–2002 | FSV Lok Altmark Stendal | 23 | (5) |
| 2002–2003 | Tennis Borussia Berlin | 31 | (24) |
| 2003–2004 | Hansa Rostock (A) | 41 | (30) |
| 2004 | Hansa Rostock | 2 | (0) |
| 2005 | VfL Wolfsburg (A) | 11 | (4) |
| 2005–2006 | VfL Osnabrück | 4 | (0) |
| 2006 | Eintracht Trier | 10 | (6) |
| 2007 | SV Babelsberg 03 | 30 | (14) |
| 2008–2010 | Union Berlin | 49 | (21) |
| 2009–2010 | Union Berlin II | 3 | (3) |
| 2010 | Dynamo Dresden | 5 | (0) |
| 2011 | 1. FC Magdeburg | 10 | (0) |
| 2011–2012 | Berliner FC Dynamo | 3 | (2) |
- * Club domestic league appearances and goals

Shergo Biran (born 4 January 1979) is a German former professional footballer who played as a forward. He was born in West Berlin.
