= Steven Jahn =

German footballer

Personal information
- Full name: Steven Jahn
- Date of birth: 15 July 1989 (age 37)
- Place of birth: Luckenwalde, East Germany
- Height: 1.71 m (5 ft 7 in)
- Position: Striker

Youth career
- 1997–2002: FSV Luckenwalde
- 2002–2008: 1. FC Union Berlin

Senior career*
Years	Team	Apps	(Gls)
2008–2010	1. FC Union Berlin	6	(0)
2010–2011	TSG Neustrelitz	15	(1)
2011–2012	Brandenburger SC Süd 05	11	(5)
2016–2017	TuS Sachsenhausen	16	(1)
2017	FSV 63 Luckenwalde	8	(0)
- * Club domestic league appearances and goals as of 25 August 2017

Steven Jahn (born 15 July 1989) is a German retired footballer. He was born in Luckenwalde.
