= Manuel Benthin =

German footballer

Personal information
- Date of birth: 3 March 1979 (age 47)
- Place of birth: East Berlin, East Germany
- Height: 1.78 m (5 ft 10 in)
- Position: Defender

Senior career*
Years	Team	Apps	(Gls)
–1997	Reinickendorfer Füchse	15	(0)
1997–1999	Hamburger SV II	40	(1)
2000	Tennis Borussia Berlin	4	(0)
2000–2002	Union Berlin	11	(0)
2002	Alemannia Aachen	11	(0)
2003	Erzgebirge Aue	1	(0)
2003–2005	SV Babelsberg 03	11	(0)
2005–2008	Berliner FC Dynamo	42	(2)
Total		135	(3)

International career
2000–2001	Germany U-21	12	(0)
- * Club domestic league appearances and goals

Manuel Benthin (born 3 March 1979) is a German former professional footballer who played as a defender.

== Career ==
Benthin was born in Berlin-Marzahn, East Germany. He was somewhat of a journeyman when it comes to the football clubs he has played for over the years. Since turning professional in the late 1990s, Benthin has signed for ten different German teams. The defender has played 17 games in the 2. Bundesliga for Tennis Borussia Berlin, 1. FC Union Berlin and Alemannia Aachen.
