= Ivan Kozák =

Slovak footballer

Personal information
- Full name: Ivan Kozák
- Date of birth: 18 June 1970 (age 56)
- Place of birth: Považská Bystrica, Czechoslovakia
- Height: 1.85 m (6 ft 1 in)
- Position: Defender

Youth career
- Púchov

Senior career*
Years	Team	Apps	(Gls)
1989–1994	Banská Bystrica	99	(4)
1994–1999	Košice	120	(14)
1999–2001	Tennis Borussia Berlin	67	(0)
2000	→ Lokeren (loan)	1	(0)
2001–2004	Union Berlin	43	(0)
2004–2005	Ružomberok	29	(0)
2005–2007	Košice	33	(0)

International career
	Czechoslovakia U21	8	(0)
1994–2002	Slovakia	38	(0)
- * Club domestic league appearances and goals

Ivan Kozák (born 18 June 1970) is a Slovak former professional footballer who played for FK Dukla Banská Bystrica, 1. FC Košice, MFK Ružomberok and German teams Tennis Borussia Berlin and 1. FC Union Berlin. He made 38 appearances for Slovakia.

Kozák was a leader of the 1. FC Košice defense in the championship winning seasons of 1997 and 1998, and also in the 1997–98 UEFA Champions League campaign. Nowadays he is working in the structures of MFK Košice.

== Career statistics ==
Appearances and goals by national team and year
National team	Year	Apps	Goals
Slovakia	1994	2	0
Slovakia	1995	4	0
Slovakia	1996	7	0
Slovakia	1997	11	0
Slovakia	1998	7	0
Slovakia	1999	1	0
Slovakia	2001	3	0
Slovakia	2002	3	0
Total		38	0
