= John Mosquera =

Colombian footballer (born 1988)

Personal information
- Full name: John Jairo Mosquera
- Date of birth: 15 January 1988 (age 38)
- Place of birth: Apartadó, Colombia
- Height: 1.92 m (6 ft 4 in)
- Position: Forward

Youth career
- 2002–2003: Millonarios
- 2004–2005: River Plate

Senior career*
| Years | Team | Apps | (Gls) |
| 2002 | Millonarios | 1 | (0) |
| 2005 | Unión Magdalena | 6 | (0) |
| 2006–2011 | Werder Bremen | 3 | (1) |
| 2006 | → SønderjyskE (loan) | 7 | (1) |
| 2006–2007 | → Wacker Burghausen (loan) | 17 | (1) |
| 2008 | → Alemannia Aachen (loan) | 7 | (0) |
| 2008–2009 | → SønderjyskE (loan) | 18 | (3) |
| 2009–2011 | → Union Berlin (loan) | 61 | (15) |
| 2011–2012 | Union Berlin | 18 | (6) |
| 2012 | Changchun Yatai | 7 | (1) |
| 2013–2014 | Energie Cottbus | 14 | (0) |
| 2014 | Gil Vicente | 11 | (0) |
| 2014–2015 | Envigado | 10 | (0) |
| 2016 | Llaneros | 8 | (1) |
| 2017 | La Serena | 21 | (8) |
| 2018 | NorthEast United | 8 | (1) |
| 2018–2020 | Royal Pari | 70 | (38) |
| 2021 | Always Ready | 5 | (1) |
| 2021 | Guabirá | 16 | (9) |
| 2022 | Sporting Cristal | 4 | (0) |

International career
| 2006–2007 | Colombia U20 | 8 | (4) |
- * Club domestic league appearances and goals

John Jairo Mosquera (born 15 January 1988) is a Colombian former professional footballer who played as a forward.

He spent most of his professional career in Germany, including at Werder Bremen where he appeared in three Bundesliga matches. He also represented in the country Wacker Burghausen, Alemannia Aachen, Union Berlin and Energie Cottbus.

== Club career ==
Born in Apartadó, Antioquia Department, Mosquera started his career in the youth teams of Millonarios FC, finishing his development at Club Atlético River Plate in Argentina. He returned to his country in July 2005 as he joined Unión Magdalena, where he played for half a year; while at the service of Millonarios, he became the youngest player to start a match in the Categoría Primera A at the age of 14.

A Werder Bremen scout spotted Mosquera at the South American Under-17 Championship, and signed him in January 2006 to a three-and-a-half-year contract. He was immediately loaned to Danish Superliga side SønderjyskE Fodbold.

In 2006–07, Mosquera was loaned to another club in the country, Wacker Burghausen of the 2. Bundesliga. During the entire campaign, he scored only once (against SpVgg Unterhaching in a 2–0 away win) as the team finished in the penultimate position and were relegated.

Mosquera had a trial at Carl Zeiss Jena in summer 2007, but a heart attack made any eventual deal fall through. Having returned to Werder Bremen for 2007–08 – his league debut came on 3 November against Hansa Rostock and his first top-flight goal against Energie Cottbus 21 days later, always as a late substitute– he was loaned again in the 2008 January transfer window, to Alemannia Aachen in the second tier.

On 24 June 2008, Mosquera was once again loaned, rejoining SønderjyskE in a season-long move. He helped his team narrowly escape top-tier relegation and, after his return to Werder, renewed his link and was loaned immediately, now to Union Berlin from Germany's 2. Bundesliga.

In late January 2013, after a brief spell in China, Mosquera returned to Germany and its second division by joining Energie Cottbus. One year later, having failed to find the net during his stint, his contract was terminated.

== International career ==
Mosquera was a member of the Colombia under-20 team at the 2007 South American U-20 Championship.
