= Hüzeyfe Doğan =

German footballer

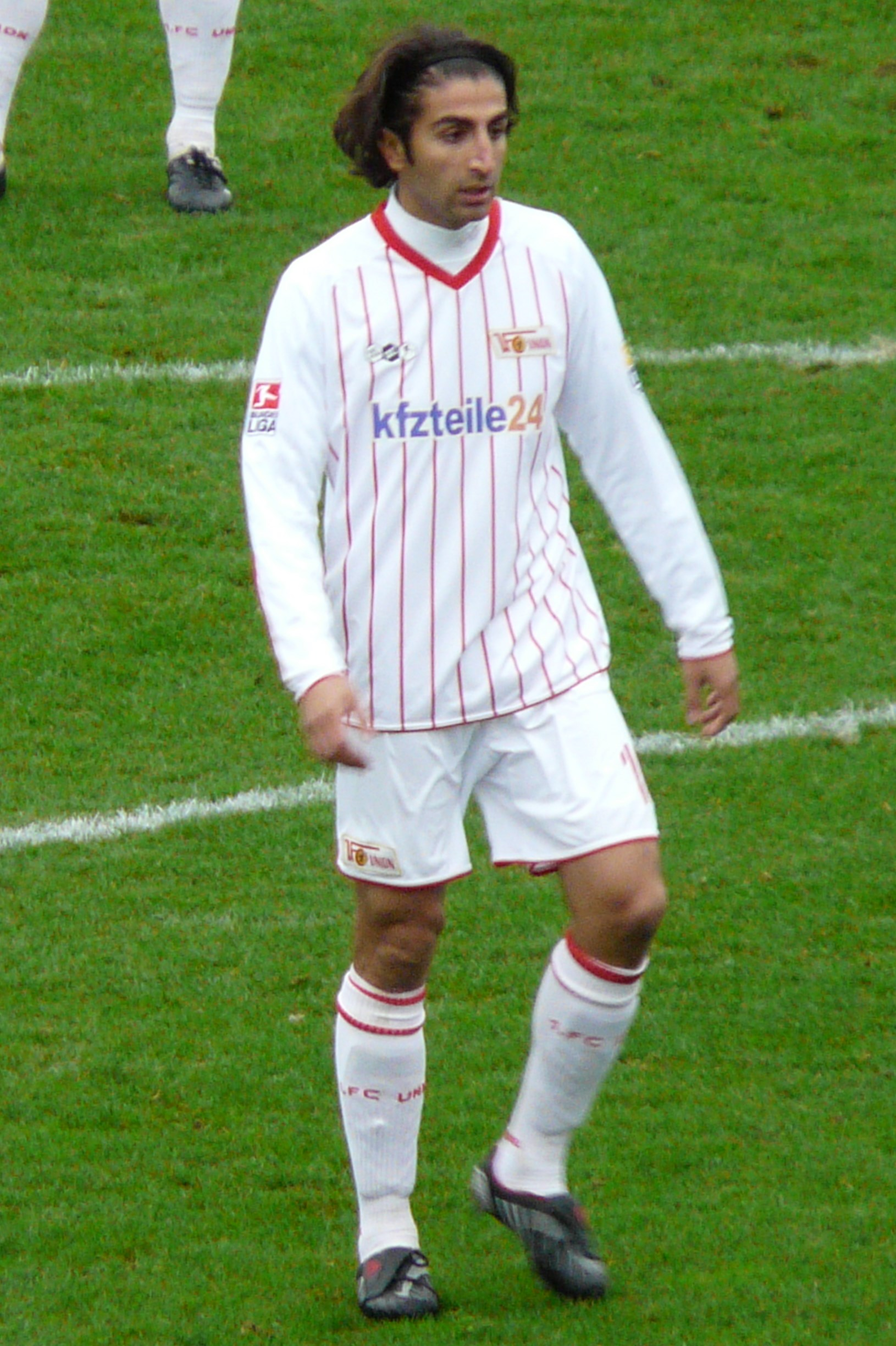
- Doğan with Union Berlin in 2009

Personal information
- Full name: Hüzeyfe Doğan
- Date of birth: 1 January 1981 (age 45)
- Place of birth: Karakoçan, Turkey
- Height: 1.81 m (5 ft 11 in)
- Position: Attacking midfielder

Youth career
- 1. FC Ringsdorff-Godesberg
- Bonner SC
- 1997–2001: Bayer Leverkusen II

Senior career*
Years	Team	Apps	(Gls)
1996–1997	Bonner SC		
1997–2003	Bayer Leverkusen II	92	(15)
2001–2003	Bayer Leverkusen	0	(0)
2003–2005	Ankaragücü	23	(3)
2005–2007	SC Paderborn	34	(6)
2007–2008	Wuppertaler SV	27	(4)
2008–2010	Union Berlin	62	(12)
2010–2011	Preußen Münster	18	(2)
2011–2012	Denizlispor	16	(6)
2012–2013	Yeni Malatyaspor	12	(2)
2013–2016	SSVg Velbert	87	(30)
2016–2018	SSVg Velbert II	30	(5)
Total		401	(85)

International career
2000	Turkey U19	1	(0)
2001	Germany U20	2	(0)

Managerial career
- 2016–2018: SSVg Velbert II
- 2018–2020: TVD Velbert
- 2021–2022: SSVg Velbert
- 2022–2023: Wuppertaler SV
- * Club domestic league appearances and goals

Hüzeyfe Doğan (born 1 January 1981) is a former professional footballer who played as an attacking midfielder. Born in Turkey and raised in Germany, he represented the Turkey U19 and then the Germany U20s internationally.

== Club career ==
Doğan was born in Karakoçan, Turkey. He moved to Germany at young age and as naturalized German citizen. He started his career with Bonner SC before joined Bayer Leverkusen's youth system. He stayed for six years, and like many Turks in Germany, he tried his chances by joining a Turkish team. He joined Ankaragücü in summer 2003, but returned to Germany for SC Paderborn 07 in summer 2005.

== International career ==
He played for Germany, the country where he was raised, at 2001 FIFA World Youth Championship.
