= David Hollwitz =

German footballer

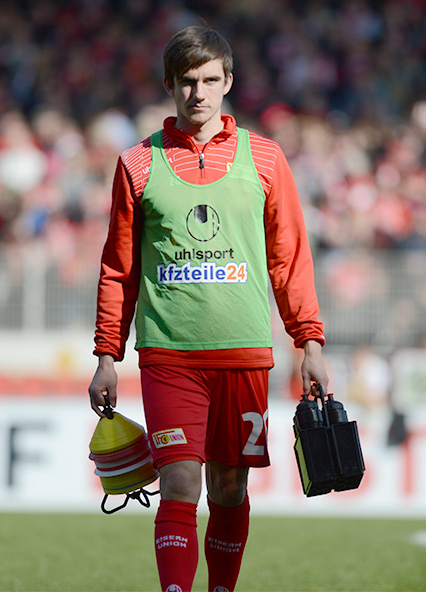
- Hollwitz in 2015

Personal information
- Full name: David Hollwitz
- Date of birth: 20 March 1989 (age 37)
- Place of birth: Luckenwalde, East Germany
- Height: 1.84 m (6 ft 0 in)
- Position: Midfielder

Team information
- Current team: Lichtenberg 47
- Number: 7

Youth career
- 1995–2001: VfB Trebbin
- 2001–2008: Union Berlin

Senior career*
Years	Team	Apps	(Gls)
2008–2011	Union Berlin II	27	(3)
2008–2010	→ Union Berlin	4	(0)
2011–2012	SV Babelsberg 03	10	(0)
2012–2015	Union Berlin II	75	(19)
2013–2015	Union Berlin	3	(0)
2015–2017	Viktoria Berlin	58	(1)
2017–	Lichtenberg 47	82	(16)
- * Club domestic league appearances and goals as of 12:51, 30 January 2021 (UTC)

David Hollwitz (born 20 March 1989 in Luckenwalde) is a German footballer who plays as a midfielder for SV Lichtenberg 47.
