= Sebastian Bönig =

German footballer and coach

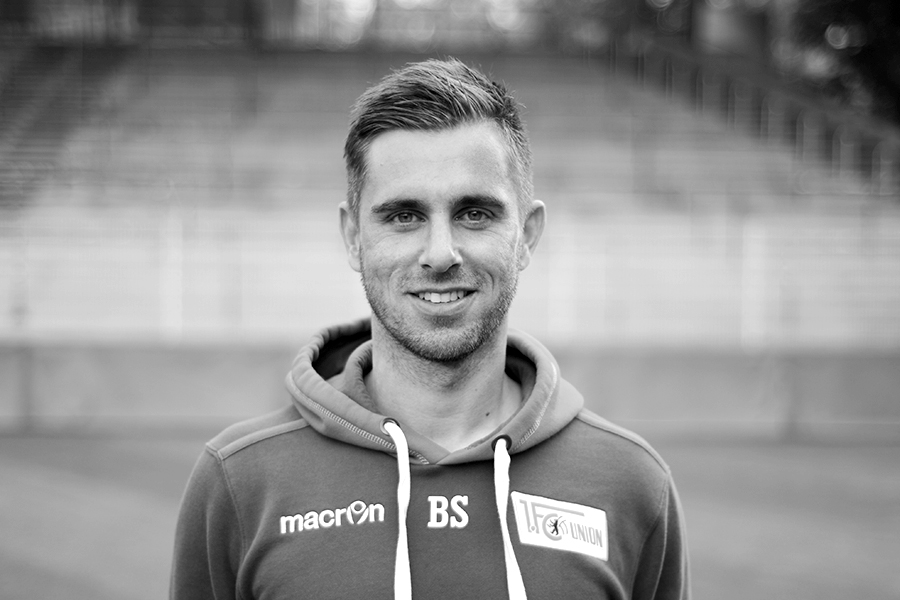
- Bönig in 2015

Personal information
- Full name: Sebastian Bönig
- Date of birth: 26 August 1981 (age 45)
- Place of birth: Erding, West Germany
- Height: 1.76 m (5 ft 9 in)
- Position: Midfielder

Team information
- Current team: Union Berlin (assistant)

Youth career
- 1985–1996: SE Freising
- 1996–2000: FC Bayern Munich

Senior career*
Years	Team	Apps	(Gls)
2000–2002	Bayern Munich (A)	34	(3)
2002–2004	LR Ahlen	44	(1)
2004–2009	Union Berlin	122	(7)
2011–2012	BFC Viktoria 1889	12	(3)
Total		212	(14)
- * Club domestic league appearances and goals

Sebastian Bönig (born 26 August 1981 in Erding) is a German football coach and former player, who is the currently assistant manager of Bundesliga club Union Berlin. During his playing career, he played for Bayern Munich (A), LR Ahlen, Union Berlin, and BFC Viktoria 1889.

== Personal life ==
His brother, Philipp Bönig, is also a professional footballer.
