= Bernd Rauw =

Belgian footballer

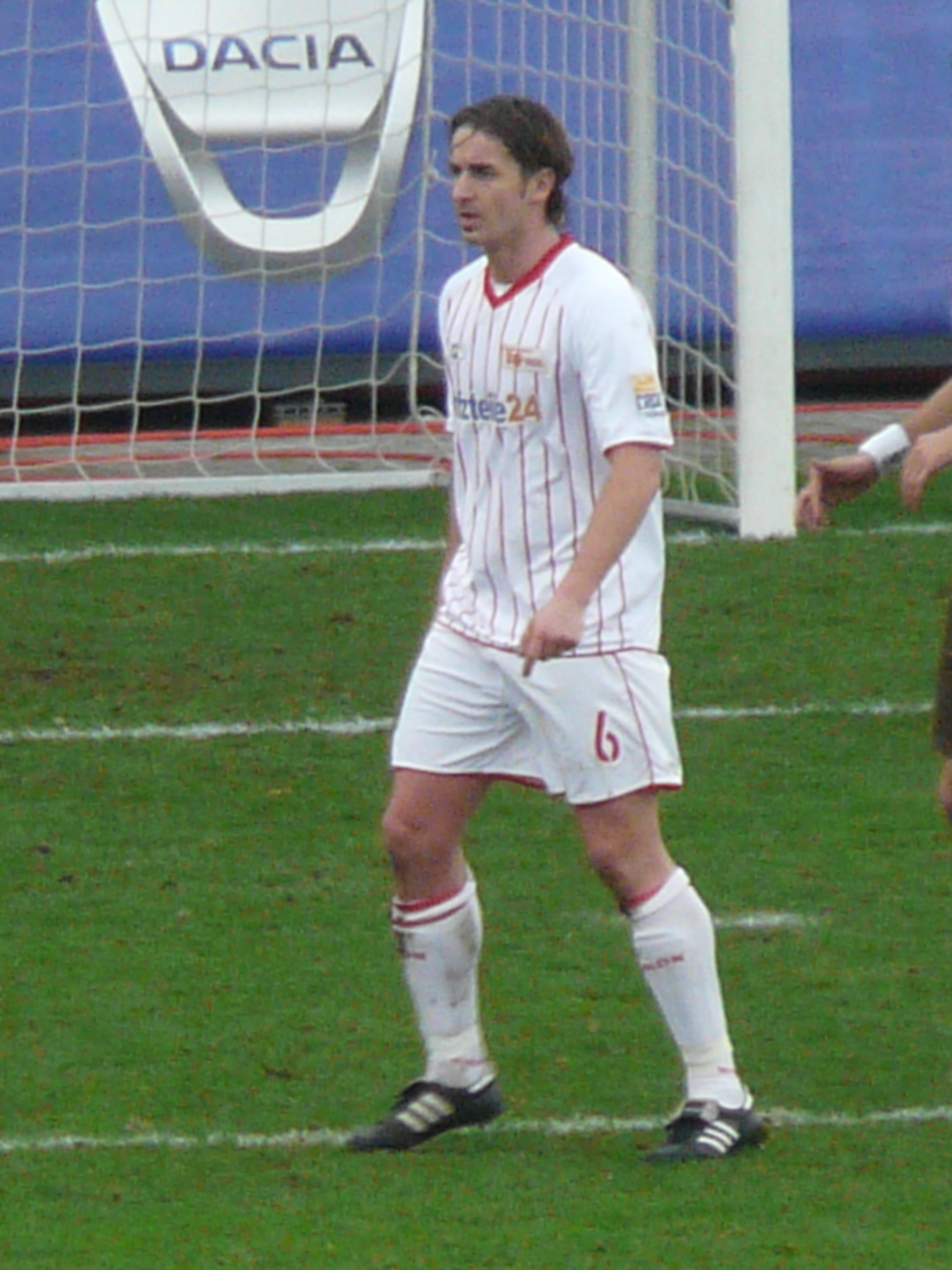
- Rauw with Union Berlin in 2009

Personal information
- Full name: Bernd Gerd Rauw
- Date of birth: 8 January 1980 (age 46)
- Place of birth: Malmedy, Belgium
- Height: 1.81 m (5 ft 11 in)
- Position: Defender

Youth career
- Standard Liège
- FC Büllingen
- 1997–1999: Alemannia Aachen

Senior career*
Years	Team	Apps	(Gls)
1999–2002	Alemannia Aachen	66	(2)
2002–2005	Arminia Bielefeld	48	(0)
2005–2006	Alemannia Aachen	6	(0)
2006–2007	MVV	35	(0)
2007–2009	Kickers Emden	52	(4)
2009–2011	Union Berlin	42	(0)
2011–2013	Rot-Weiß Erfurt	45	(0)
Total		294	(6)
- * Club domestic league appearances and goals

Bernd Gerd Rauw (born 8 January 1980) is a Belgian former professional footballer who played as a defender.
