= Björn Brunnemann =

German footballer

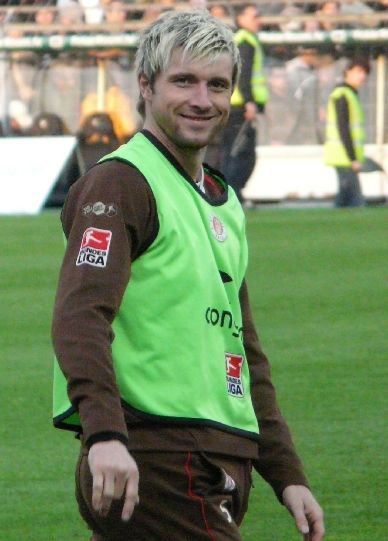
- Brunnemann warming up with FC St. Pauli

Personal information
- Date of birth: 6 August 1980 (age 46)
- Place of birth: Kyritz, East Germany
- Height: 1.83 m (6 ft 0 in)
- Position: Midfielder

Youth career
- Blau-Weiß Wusterhausen
- MSV Neuruppin

Senior career*
Years	Team	Apps	(Gls)
1999–2003	Hansa Rostock	83	(12)
2003–2005	Energie Cottbus II	26	(5)
2003–2005	Energie Cottbus	31	(0)
2005–2007	Rot-Weiß Erfurt	62	(14)
2007–2009	FC St. Pauli	28	(2)
2009–2011	Union Berlin	35	(3)
2011–2012	Berliner AK	22	(4)
2012–2016	BFC Dynamo	86	(10)
2016–2019	VSG Altglienicke	54	(5)
Total		427	(55)
- * Club domestic league appearances and goals

Björn Brunnemann (born 6 August 1980) is a German former professional footballer who played as a midfielder.

== Career ==
Brunnemann was born in Kyritz, East Germany. He made his debut on the professional league level in the 2. Bundesliga for FC Energie Cottbus on 10 August 2003 when he came on as a substitute in the 69th minute in a game against 1. FC Union Berlin.

Following seasons with teams including FC St. Pauli he signed with BFC Dynamo in 2012. In his first season with the wine-reds he won the Berlin Cup trophy, thus qualifying for the DFB-Pokal. In his second season with BFC Dynamo he led the team to 19 victories in its initial 20 championship games, thus helping the side to secure promotion to Regionalliga. In March 2014, he extended his contract with BFC throughout the 2014–15 season.
