= Rayk Schröder =

German footballer

Personal information
- Date of birth: 25 December 1974 (age 51)
- Place of birth: East Berlin, East Germany
- Height: 1.86 m (6 ft 1 in)
- Position: Defender

Youth career
- BSG KWO Berlin
- Berliner FC Dynamo

Senior career*
Years	Team	Apps	(Gls)
1992–1995	FC Berlin	60	(3)
1995–1996	1. FC Union Berlin	32	(0)
1996–1998	TSV 1860 Munich	7	(0)
1998–2000	FC Energie Cottbus	60	(3)
2000–2002	F.C. Hansa Rostock	49	(3)
2002–2005	FC Energie Cottbus	5	(1)
2005	Carl Zeiss Jena	0	(0)
- * Club domestic league appearances and goals

Rayk Schröder (born 25 December 1974 in East Berlin, East Germany) is a German former footballer. He spent four seasons in the Bundesliga with TSV 1860 Munich, F.C. Hansa Rostock and FC Energie Cottbus.

== Career ==
Schröder began playing football for enterprise sports community BSG KWO Berlin. He was then allowed to join the youth academy of football club and East German champion BFC Dynamo in 1984. Schröder made his first appearance with the first team of BFC Dynamo, then named FC Berlin, away against BSV Brandeburg on the 24th matchday on 6 March 1993. FC Berlin was coached by Jürgen Bogs at the time. Schröder made numerous appearances for FC Berlin in the 1993–94 NOFV-Oberliga Nord. He would then be a key player in the team in the 1994-95 Regionalliga Nordost.

Schröder joined 1. FC Union Berlin for the 1995–96 season. He played for one year in the Regionalliga Nord and transferred after that to Bundesliga club TSV 1860 Munich, making seven appearances in the 1996–97 season. As he did not play in the Bundesliga in the following season, he moved to second division club Energie Cottbus. In Cottbus, Schröder became a regular, making 60 appearances and scoring three goals. In the 1999–2000 season, he helped Cottbus to gain promotion to the Bundesliga. He then transferred to Hansa Rostock, where he made 49 appearances and scored three goals in two seasons. For the 2002–03 season, he returned to Energie Cottbus. When he only played in Cottbus' second team, he joined FC Carl Zeiss Jena, but the contract was dissolved in pre-season when Schröder had to end his playing career due to a knee injury.
