= Kenan Şahin =

Turkish-German footballer

Personal information
- Date of birth: 27 October 1984 (age 42)
- Place of birth: Cologne, West Germany
- Height: 1.84 m (6 ft 0 in)
- Position: Striker

Team information
- Current team: RSV Urbach

Youth career
- DJK Grün-Weiß Nippes
- Fortuna Köln
- 2003: Bayer Leverkusen

Senior career*
Years	Team	Apps	(Gls)
2003–2004	Bayer Leverkusen	6	(0)
2005–2006	Energie Cottbus	31	(2)
2006–2007	TuS Koblenz	36	(4)
2008	Fortuna Düsseldorf	21	(5)
2009–2011	Union Berlin	53	(8)
2011–2012	Denizlispor	14	(1)
2012–2013	Kayseri Erciyesspor	26	(5)
2013–2014	Mersin İdman Yurdu	11	(1)
2014	Osmanlıspor	6	(0)
2014–2015	Boluspor	28	(3)
2015–2016	Elazığspor	26	(3)
2017	Bergama Belediyespor	10	(2)
2017–2018	İnegölspor	12	(1)
2018	Eyüpspor	2	(0)
2019–	RSV Urbach	0	(0)

International career
2004–2005	Turkey U-21	1	(0)
- * Club domestic league appearances and goals as of 5 May 2018

Kenan Şahin (born 27 October 1984) is a Turkish-German footballer who plays as a striker for an amateur German side RSV Urbach.
