= Christian Beeck =

German footballer (born 1971)

Personal information
- Date of birth: 18 December 1971 (age 54)
- Place of birth: Rathenow, East Germany
- Height: 1.90 m (6 ft 3 in)
- Position: Defender

Youth career
- –1989: BFC Dynamo

Senior career*
Years	Team	Apps	(Gls)
1990–1992	BSV Stahl Brandenburg	23	(1)
1992–1993	SG Bergmann-Borsig		
1993–1995	Union Berlin		
1995–1996	Hansa Rostock	26	(0)
1997–1999	Fortuna Düsseldorf	34	(3)
1999–2005	Energie Cottbus	107	(5)
- * Club domestic league appearances and goals

Christian Beeck (born 18 December 1971) is a German former professional footballer who played as a defender. He was the team captain of FC Energie Cottbus in the 2. Bundesliga.

Beeck's career ended after he suffered a knee injury when playing for Cottbus. On 27 September 2005, he took a coaching role with Union Berlin.

== After retiring ==
After retiring in 2005, Beeck was hired as athletic supervisor for Union Berlin. He left the job in 2011, and was hired at Energie Cottbus also as athletic supervisor. In June 2013 he left the job.

Following his career in football, he worked for EW Energy World GmbH.
