= 2001–02 VfB Stuttgart season =

VfB Stuttgart
2001–02 season
- Manager: Felix Magath
- Bundesliga: 8th
- DFB-Pokal: Third round
- Top goalscorer: Ionel Ganea (10)
Home colours	Away colours	Third colours

VfB Stuttgart had an average season in its first season under Felix Magath. It finished 8th in Bundesliga, qualifying for the Intertoto Cup. The season also saw Stuttgart breaking its transfer record, when the club signed Fernando Meira for € 7.5 million.

== First-team squad ==
Squad at end of season

Note: Flags indicate national team as defined under FIFA eligibility rules; some limited exceptions apply. Players may hold more than one non-FIFA nationality.

No.	Pos.	Nation	Player
1	GK	GER	Timo Hildebrand
2	DF	GER	Andreas Hinkel
3	DF	GER	Timo Wenzel
4	DF	ANG	Rui Marques
5	DF	BRA	Marcelo Bordon
6	DF	POR	Fernando Meira
7	MF	GER	Silvio Meißner
8	MF	GER	Jens Todt
9	FW	ROU	Ionel Ganea
10	MF	BUL	Krasimir Balakov
12	DF	GER	Heiko Gerber
13	MF	GER	Christian Tiffert
14	MF	GER	Thomas Schneider
15	MF	BLR	Alexander Hleb
16	DF	RSA	Bradley Carnell
17	DF	GER	Jochen Seitz

No.	Pos.	Nation	Player
19	FW	BRA	Adhemar
20	DF	CRO	Zvonimir Soldo
21	DF	GER	Jochen Endreß
22	FW	GER	Kevin Kurányi (Note: Kurányi was born in Rio de Janeiro, Brazil, but also qualified to represent Germany internationally through his father and Panama through his mother and represented Germany at U-21 and B level before making his international debut for Germany in March 2003.)
24	GK	GER	Thomas Ernst
25	DF	GER	Fabio Morena
26	MF	GER	Robert Vujević
29	DF	GER	Steffen Dangelmayr
30	GK	BIH	Adnan Masić
35	MF	GER	Alessandro Caruso
36	FW	GER	Sean Dundee (Note: Dundee was born in Durban, South Africa, but also qualified to represent Germany internationally after gaining citizenship and represented Germany at B level.)
43	DF	GER	Steffen Kocholl
44	DF	GER	Michael Rundio
—	MF	GER	Benjamin Adrion
—	FW	GER	Marvin Braun
—	FW	GER	Steffen Handschuh

== Results ==
=== Bundesliga ===
- Stuttgart-Köln 0–0
- Hamburg-Stuttgart 2–0
- 1–0 Jörg Albertz 40'
- 2–0 Erik Meijer 49'
- Stuttgart-Werder Bremen 0–0
- Nürnberg-Stuttgart 2–4
- 0–1 Ionel Ganea 4'
- 1–1 Marek Nikl 38'
- 2–1 Marek Nikl 49'
- 2–2 Jens Todt 58'
- 2–3 Ionel Ganea 61'
- 2–4 Adhemar 88'
- Stuttgart-Hertha BSC 0–0
- Wolfsburg-Stuttgart 0–2
- 0–1 Jochen Seitz 7'
- 0–2 Krassimir Balakov 65' (pen.)
- Stuttgart-Hansa Rostock 2–1
- 0–1 Andreas Jakobsson 11'
- 1–1 Krassimir Balakov 55' (pen.)
- 2–1 Ionel Ganea 85'
- Bayern Munich-Stuttgart 4–0
- 1–0 Giovane Élber 10'
- 2–0 Giovane Élber 13'
- 3–0 Giovane Élber 61'
- 4–0 Paulo Sérgio 90'
- Stuttgart-Schalke 04 3–0
- 1–0 Marcelo Bordon 35'
- 2–0 Ionel Ganea 52'
- 3–0 Alexander Hleb 54'
- Bayer Leverkusen-Stuttgart 4–1
- 0–1 Ionel Ganea 10'
- 1–1 Zé Roberto 24'
- 2–1 Boris Živković 59'
- 3–1 Lúcio 63'
- 4–1 Dimitar Berbatov 86'
- Stuttgart-St. Pauli 2–0
- 1–0 Christian Tiffert 11'
- 2–0 Jochen Endress 89'
- Borussia Dortmund-Stuttgart 1–0
- 1–0 Lars Ricken 51'
- Stuttgart-Freiburg 3–0
- 1–0 Silvio Meißner 5'
- 2–0 Christian Tiffert 75'
- 3–0 Jochen Seitz 90'
- Energie Cottbus-Stuttgart 0–0
- Stuttgart-Mönchengladbach 1–1
- 1–0 Timo Wenzel 49'
- 1–1 Marco Kuntzel 90'
- Stuttgart-1860 Munich 0–1
- 0–1 Didier Dheedene 65'
- Kaiserslautern-Stuttgart 2–2
- 1–0 Ratinho 4'
- 1–1 Silvio Meißner 32'
- 2–1 Vratislav Lokvenc 63'
- 2–2 Kevin Kurányi 86'
- Köln-Stuttgart 0–0
- Stuttgart-Hamburg 3–0
- 1–0 Ionel Ganea 27'
- 2–0 Ingo Hertzsch 32' (o.g.)
- 3–0 Marcelo Bordon 77'
- Werder Bremen-Stuttgart 1–2
- 1–0 Marco Bode 39'
- 1–1 Ionel Ganea 62'
- 1–2 Christian Tiffert 84'
- Stuttgart-Nürnberg 2–3
- 0–1 Cacau 15'
- 1–1 Marcelo Bordon 24'
- 1–2 Cacau 26'
- 2–2 Ionel Ganea 59'
- 2–3 Tommy Svindal Larsen 77'
- Hertha BSC-Stuttgart 2–0
- 1–0 Marcelinho 16'
- 2–0 Marcelinho 36'
- Stuttgart-VfL Wolfsburg 2–1
- 1–0 Silvio Meißner 9'
- 2–0 Alexander Hleb 77'
- 2–1 Diego Klimowicz 87'
- Hansa Rostock-Stuttgart 1–1
- 1–0 René Rydlewicz 30' (pen.)
- 1–1 Fernando Meira 72'
- Stuttgart-Bayern Munich 0–2
- 0–1 Roque Santa Cruz 32'
- 0–2 Mehmet Scholl 39'
- Schalke 04-Stuttgart 2–1
- 1–0 Tomasz Wałdoch 59'
- 1–1 Adhemar 78'
- 2–1 Ebbe Sand 90'
- Stuttgart-Bayer Leverkusen 0–2
- 0–1 Thomas Brdarić 40'
- 0–2 Dimitar Berbatov 45'
- St. Pauli-Stuttgart 1–2
- 0–1 Krassimir Balakov 75'
- 0–2 Sean Dundee 81'
- 1–2 Matías Cenci 83'
- Stuttgart-Borussia Dortmund 3–2
- 1–0 Sean Dundee 33'
- 2–0 Silvio Meißner 37'
- 2–1 Christian Wörns 51'
- 3–1 Ionel Ganea 64'
- 3–2 Jan Koller 78'
- Freiburg-Stuttgart 0–2
- 0–1 Fernando Meira 79'
- 0–2 Steffen Handschuh 87'
- Stuttgart-Energie Cottbus 0–0
- Mönchengladbach-Stuttgart 2–2
- 0–1 Krassimir Balakov 44'
- 1–1 Peter Van Houdt 68'
- 2–1 Benjamin Auer 80'
- 2–2 Sean Dundee 84'
- 1860 Munich-Stuttgart 3–3
- 0–1 Sean Dundee 20'
- 0–2 Silvio Meißner 43'
- 1–2 Martin Max 53' (pen.)
- 2–2 Martin Max 60'
- 2–3 Silvio Meißner 63'
- 3–3 Daniel Borimirov 79'
- Stuttgart-Kaiserslautern 4–3
- 1–0 Silvio Meißner 42'
- 1–1 Lincoln 45'
- 2–1 Sean Dundee 46'
- 2–2 Marian Hristov 60'
- 3–2 Silvio Meißner 65'
- 3–3 Miroslav Klose 71'
- 4–3 Ionel Ganea 73'

=== Topscorers ===
- (Romania) Ionel Ganea 10
- (Germany) Silvio Meißner 7
- (Germany) Sean Dundee 5

== Kits ==
Home	Home Alternate	Home Alt. 2	Away	Third

== Sources ==
Results & Fixtures for Stuttgart – soccerbase.com
