= 2002–03 VfB Stuttgart season =

VfB Stuttgart
2002–03 season
- Chairman: Manfred Haas
- Manager: Felix Magath
- Bundesliga: 2nd
- UEFA Cup: Round of 16
- DFB-Pokal: Second round
- Intertoto Cup: Champions
- Top goalscorer: Kevin Kurányi (15)
Home colours	Away colours	Third colours

VfB Stuttgart reached the UEFA Champions League for the first time in more than ten years, following a surprising runner-up position in Bundesliga. Coach Felix Magath was hailed as the man behind the success, in his second full season at the helm, managing to unite a squad with lesser-known players to form a side strong enough to overhaul reigning champions Borussia Dortmund for the automatic qualification spot. It was also the breakthrough season of exciting young talents such as Alexander Hleb, Timo Hildebrand and Kevin Kurányi.

== Players ==
=== First-team squad ===
Squad at end of season

Note: Flags indicate national team as defined under FIFA eligibility rules; some limited exceptions apply. Players may hold more than one non-FIFA nationality.

No.	Pos.	Nation	Player
1	GK	(Germany) GER	Timo Hildebrand
2	DF	(Germany) GER	Andreas Hinkel
3	DF	(Germany) GER	Timo Wenzel
4	DF	(Angola) ANG	Rui Marques
5	DF	(Brazil) BRA	Marcelo Bordon
6	DF	(Portugal) POR	Fernando Meira
7	MF	(Germany) GER	Silvio Meißner
8	MF	(Germany) GER	Jens Todt
9	FW	(Romania) ROU	Ionel Ganea
10	MF	(Bulgaria) BUL	Krasimir Balakov
11	FW	(Greece) GRE	Ioannis Amanatidis
12	DF	(Germany) GER	Heiko Gerber
13	MF	(Germany) GER	Christian Tiffert
14	MF	(Germany) GER	Thomas Schneider
15	MF	(Belarus) BLR	Alexander Hleb

No.	Pos.	Nation	Player
16	DF	(South Africa) RSA	Bradley Carnell
17	DF	(Germany) GER	Jochen Seitz
18	FW	(Germany) GER	Sean Dundee (Note: Dundee was born in Durban, South Africa, but also qualified to represent Germany internationally after gaining citizenship and represented Germany at B level.)
19	MF	(Germany) GER	Horst Heldt
20	DF	(Croatia) CRO	Zvonimir Soldo
21	GK	(Germany) GER	Thomas Ernst
22	FW	(Germany) GER	Kevin Kurányi (Note: Kurányi was born in Rio de Janeiro, Brazil, but also qualified to represent Germany internationally through his father and Panama through his mother and represented Germany at U-21 and B level before making his international debut for Germany in March 2003.)
24	MF	(Germany) GER	Benjamin Adrion
25	MF	(Germany) GER	Michael Mutzel
26	MF	(Germany) GER	Robert Vujević
29	DF	(Germany) GER	Steffen Dangelmayr
31	GK	(Switzerland) SUI	Diego Benaglio
33	FW	(Germany) GER	Steffen Handschuh
43	DF	(Germany) GER	Steffen Kocholl
44	DF	(Germany) GER	Michael Rundio

=== Left club during season ===
Note: Flags indicate national team as defined under FIFA eligibility rules; some limited exceptions apply. Players may hold more than one non-FIFA nationality.

No. / Pos. / Nation / Player; 19 / FW / (Brazil) BRA / Adhemar (to São Caetano)	No. / Pos. / Nation / Player; 23 / FW / (Nigeria) NGA / Stephen Famewo (demoted to VfB Stuttgart II)

== Results ==
=== Bundesliga ===
- Stuttgart-Kaiserslautern 1–1
- 1–0 Sean Dundee (45)
- 1–1 Miroslav Klose (52)
- Hertha BSC-Stuttgart 1–1
- 0–1 Sean Dundee (14)
- 1–1 Arne Friedrich (85)
- Borussia Dortmund-Stuttgart 3–1
- 1–0 Jan Koller (39)
- 2–0 Leandro (66)
- 2–1 Sean Dundee (76)
- 3–1 Ewerthon (88)
- Stuttgart-Schalke 04 1–1
- 1–0 Marcelo Bordon (34)
- 1–1 Tomasz Hajto (86 pen)
- Mönchengladbach-Stuttgart 1–1
- 1–0 Markus Münch (50)
- 1–1 Kevin Kurányi (71)
- Stuttgart-Arminia Bielefeld 3–0
- 1–0 Kevin Kurányi (5)
- 2–0 Kevin Kurányi (64)
- 3–0 Kevin Kurányi (69)
- Hamburg-Stuttgart 3–2
- 0–1 Jochen Seitz (9)
- 1–1 Bernardo Romeo (14)
- 2–1 Sergej Barbarez (22)
- 2–2 Alexander Hleb (25)
- 3–2 Bernardo Romeo (86)
- Stuttgart-1860 Munich 4–1
- 0–1 Markus Schroth (23)
- 1–1 Kevin Kurányi (46)
- 2–1 Kevin Kurányi (48)
- 3–1 Ioan Ganea (50)
- 4–1 Ioan Ganea [90)
- Nürnberg-Stuttgart 1–2
- 1–0 David Jarolím (45)
- 1–1 Kevin Kurányi (80)
- 1–2 Ioannis Amanatidis (85)
- Stuttgart-Energie Cottbus 0–0
- Bayer Leverkusen-Stuttgart 0–1
- 0–1 Silvio Meißner (19)
- Stuttgart-Bochum 3–2
- 0–1 Thomas Christiansen (68)
- 1–1 Ioan Ganea (74 pen)
- 1–2 Sebastian Schindzielorz (84)
- 2–2 Ioan Ganea (86)
- 3–2 Ioan Ganea (90)
- Hansa Rostock-Stuttgart 1–1
- 1–0 Rade Priča (4)
- 1–1 Kevin Kurányi (46)
- Stuttgart-Hannover 3–0
- 1–0 Ioannis Amanatidis (35)
- 2–0 Alexander Hleb (54)
- 3–0 Kevin Kurányi (73)
- Werder Bremen-Stuttgart 3–1
- 1–0 Ailton (26)
- 1–1 Kevin Kurányi (55)
- 2–1 Mladen Krstajić (80)
- 3–1 Ailton (89 pen)
- Stuttgart-Bayern Munich 0–3
- 0–1 Alexander Zickler (28)
- 0–2 Roque Santa Cruz (33)
- 0–3 Roque Santa Cruz (68)
- Wolfsburg-Stuttgart 1–2
- 0–1 Thomas Schneider (35)
- 0–2 Fernando Meira (55)
- 1–2 Tomislav Marić (76 pen)
- Kaiserslautern-Stuttgart 1–2
- 0–1 Kevin Kurányi (29)
- 1–1 Vratislav Lokvenc (34)
- 1–2 Krassimir Balakov (69)
- Stuttgart-Hertha BSC 3–1
- 1–0 Ioannis Amanatidis (28)
- 2–0 Alexander Hleb (68)
- 2–1 Marcelinho (80)
- 3–1 Ioan Ganea (90)
- Stuttgart-Borussia Dortmund 1–0
- 1–0 Zvonimir Soldo (75)
- Schalke 04-Stuttgart 2–0
- 1–0 Émile Mpenza (3)
- 2–0 Tomasz Hajto (45)
- Stuttgart-Mönchengladbach 4–0
- 1–0 Kevin Kurányi (9)
- 2–0 Ioannis Amanatidis (23)
- 3–0 Ioan Ganea (87)
- 4–0 Kevin Kurányi (88)
- Arminia Bielefeld-Stuttgart 0–1
- 0–1 Silvio Meißner (13)
- Stuttgart-Hamburg 1–1
- 1–0 Kevin Kurányi (20)
- 1–1 Mehdi Mahdavikia (43)
- 1860 Munich-Stuttgart 0–1
- 0–1 Marcelo Bordon (41)
- Stuttgart-Nürnberg 0–2
- 0–1 David Jarolím (28)
- 0–2 Junior (88)
- Energie Cottbus-Stuttgart 2–3
- 0–1 Silvio Meißner (2)
- 1–1 Robert Vagner (7)
- 1–2 Horst Heldt (75)
- 2–2 Lars Jungnickel (84)
- 2–3 Ioan Ganea (90)
- Stuttgart-Bayer Leverkusen 3–0
- 1–0 Ioannis Amanatidis (9)
- 2–0 Alexander Hleb (17)
- 3–0 Ioan Ganea (50)
- Bochum-Stuttgart 3–1
- 0–1 Kevin Kurányi (25)
- 1–1 Vahid Hashemian (40)
- 2–1 Vahid Hashemian (66)
- 3–1 Thomas Christiansen (68)
- Stuttgart-Hansa Rostock 1–1
- 1–0 Silvio Meißner (28)
- 1–1 Delano Hill (59)
- Hannover-Stuttgart 1–2
- 0–1 Sean Dundee (19)
- 0–2 Sean Dundee (37)
- 1–2 Jiří Kaufman (85)
- Stuttgart-Werder Bremen 0–1
- 0–1 Rui Marques (50 og)
- Bayern Munich-Stuttgart 2–1
- 1–0 Giovane Élber (46)
- 2–0 Giovane Élber (76)
- 2–1 Sean Dundee (83)
- Stuttgart-Wolfsburg 2–0
- 1–0 Kevin Kurányi (12)
- 2–0 Krassimir Balakov (24 pen)

=== Top scorers ===
- (Germany) Kevin Kurányi 15
- (Romania) Ioan Ganea 9
- (Germany) Sean Dundee 6
- (Belarus) Alexander Hleb 4

== UEFA Cup ==
=== 1st round ===
- Stuttgart-Ventspils 4–1
- 1–0 Ioannis Amanatidis (22)
- 2–0 Kevin Kurányi (33)
- 3–0 Kevin Kurányi (40)
- 4–0 Alexander Hleb (60 pen)
- 4–1 Vits Rimkus (65)
- Ventspils-Stuttgart 1–4
- 1–0 Yevgeni Landyrev (16)
- 1–1 Christian Tiffert (23)
- 1–2 Ioan Ganea (52)
- 1–3 Ioannis Amanatidis (87)
- 1–4 Christian Tiffert (90)

=== 2nd round ===
- Ferencváros-Stuttgart 0–0
- Stuttgart-Ferencváros 2–0
- 1–0 Ioannis Amanatidis (65)
- 2–0 Fernando Meira (90 pen)

=== 3rd round ===
- Club Brugge-Stuttgart 1–2
- 1–0 Peter van der Heyden (42)
- 1–1 Krassimir Balakov (71)
- 1–2 Kevin Kurányi (89)
- Stuttgart-Club Brugge 1–0
- 1–0 Alexander Hleb (90)

=== Last 16 ===
- Celtic-Stuttgart 3–1
- 0–1 Kevin Kurányi (27)
- 1–1 Paul Lambert (36)
- 2–1 Shaun Maloney (45)
- 3–1 Stilian Petrov (68)
- Stuttgart-Celtic 3–2
- 0–1 Alan Thompson (12)
- 0–2 Chris Sutton (14)
- 1–2 Christian Tiffert (37)
- 2–2 Alexander Hleb (75)
- 3–2 Michael Mutzel (87)

== Sources ==
- Soccerbase
