= 2005–06 VfB Stuttgart season =

VfB Stuttgart
2005–06 season
- Manager: Giovanni Trapattoni
- Stadium: Gottlieb-Daimler-Stadion, Stuttgart, Baden-Württemberg
- Bundesliga: 9th
- DFB-Pokal: Second round
- UEFA Cup: Round of 32
- Top goalscorer: League: Jon Dahl Tomasson; Danijel Ljuboja (8 each); All: Danijel Ljuboja (12 goals)
- Highest home attendance: 56,700 (vs. Eintracht Frankfurt, 22 April)
- Lowest home attendance: 28,000 (vs. Mainz 05, 19 February)
Home colours	Away colours

The 2005–06 VfB Stuttgart season was 41st season in the Bundesliga. The club competed in Bundesliga, UEFA CUP, and the DFB Cup. In the Bundesliga, Stuttgart ended up in ninth place. They were knocked out by Middlesbrough in the first knockout round of the UEFA Cup.

Giovanni Trapattoni came to the club in June 2005, replacing Matthias Sammer, who left the club after one season.

The summer transfer window saw several changes to the squad. Important first-team players such as Kevin Kurányi, Alexander Hleb, and Philipp Lahm were replaced with Jon Dahl Tomasson, Thomas Hitzlsperger, and Ludovic Magnin.

During Trapattoni's 20 games at the helm, Stuttgart produced poor results (5 wins, 12 draws, and 3 losses). Denmark internationals Jon Dahl Tomasson and Jesper Grønkjær openly criticised their coach, claiming he was afraid to attack. Trapattoni immediately responded by dropping both players to the bench. With the atmosphere in the team worsening, he was sacked after just seven months, on 9 February 2006, reportedly for "not fulfilling the ambitions of the club". He was replaced as manager by Armin Veh. His first match was a 2–1 loss against Arminia Bielefeld on matchday 21 of the 2005–06 Bundesliga on 11 February 2006. On 18 April 2006, his contract was extended until summer 2007.

== First-team squad ==
Season squad

Note: Flags indicate national team as defined under FIFA eligibility rules; some limited exceptions apply. Players may hold more than one non-FIFA nationality.

No.	Pos.	Nation	Player
1	GK	GER	Timo Hildebrand
2	DF	GER	Andreas Hinkel
3	DF	AUT	Martin Stranzl
5	DF	GER	Markus Babbel
6	DF	POR	Fernando Meira
7	MF	GER	Silvio Meißner
8	MF	GER	Daniel Bierofka
10	FW	DEN	Jon Dahl Tomasson
11	MF	GER	Thomas Hitzlsperger
12	DF	GER	Heiko Gerber
13	MF	GER	Christian Tiffert

No.	Pos.	Nation	Player
14	MF	CRO	Mario Carević
17	DF	FRA	Matthieu Delpierre
18	FW	BRA	Cacau (Note: Cacau was born in Santo André, Brazil, but also qualified to represent Germany internationally after gaining citizenship and made his international debut for Germany in May 2009.)
20	MF	CRO	Zvonimir Soldo (captain)
21	DF	SUI	Ludovic Magnin
22	MF	DEN	Jesper Grønkjær
23	GK	GER	Dirk Heinen
32	DF	GER	Andreas Beck
33	FW	GER	Mario Gómez
38	FW	SCG	Danijel Ljuboja
40	MF	GER	Christian Gentner

== Transfers ==
=== In ===
No.	Pos	Player	Transferred from	Fee	Date	Source
8	MF	(Germany) Daniel Bierofka	(Germany) Bayer Leverkusen		Summer 2005	
10	FW	(Denmark) Jon Dahl Tomasson	(Italy) AC Milan		Summer 2005	
11	MF	(Germany) Thomas Hitzlsperger	(England) Aston Villa	Free	Summer 2005	
14	MF	(Croatia) Mario Carević	(Saudi Arabia) Al Ittihad		Summer 2005	
21	DF	(Switzerland) Ludovic Magnin	(Germany) Werder Bremen	Free	Summer 2005	
22	MF	(Denmark) Jesper Grønkjær	(Spain) Atletico Madrid		Summer 2005	
38	FW	(Serbia and Montenegro) Danijel Ljuboja	(France) Paris Saint-Germain		Summer 2005	

=== Out ===
No.	Pos	Player	Transferred to	Fee	Date	Source
8	MF	(Croatia) Jurica Vranješ	(Germany) Werder Bremen	Free	Summer 2005	
10	MF	(Belarus) Alexander Hleb	(England) Arsenal		Summer 2005	
19	FW	(Hungary) Imre Szabics	(Germany) Köln		Summer 2005	
21	DF	(Germany) Philipp Lahm	(Germany) Bayern Munich (Loan return)	N/A	Summer 2005	
22	FW	(Germany) Kevin Kurányi	(Germany) Schalke 04		Summer 2005	
3	DF	(Austria) Martin Stranzl	(Russia) Spartak Moscow		March 2006	
4	DF	(Croatia) Boris Živković	(Germany) Köln (Loan)		Winter 2006	
9	FW	(Switzerland) Marco Streller	(Germany) Köln (Loan)		Winter 2006	
15	MF	(Brazil) Élson	(Brazil) Ponte Preta (Loan)		Winter 2006	
16	MF	(Germany) Horst Heldt	Retired		Winter 2006	

=== Appearances and goals ===
No.	Pos	Nat	Player	Total		Bundesliga		DFB-Pokal	
No.	Pos	Nat	Player	Apps	Goals	Apps	Goals	Apps	Goals
Goalkeepers
1	GK	(Germany) GER	Timo Hildebrand	31	0	31	0	0	0
23	GK	(Germany) GER	Dirk Heinen	3	0	3	0	0	0
41	GK	(Austria) AUT	Michael Langer	1	0	1	0	0	0
Defenders
2	DF	(Germany) GER	Andreas Hinkel	26	0	24+2	0	0	0
3	DF	(Austria) AUT	Martin Stranzl	15	0	11+4	0	0	0
5	DF	(Germany) GER	Markus Babbel	26	0	24+2	0	0	0
6	DF	(Portugal) POR	Fernando Meira	32	0	32	0	0	0
12	DF	(Germany) GER	Heiko Gerber	10	0	7+3	0	0	0
17	DF	(France) FRA	Mathieu Delpierre	29	0	29	0	0	0
21	DF	(Switzerland) SUI	Ludovic Magnin	25	1	24+1	1	0	0
32	DF	(Germany) GER	Andreas Beck	5	0	5	0	0	0
Midfielders
7	MF	(Germany) GER	Silvio Meißner	25	2	20+5	2	0	0
8	MF	(Germany) GER	Daniel Bierofka	1	0	0+1	0	0	0
11	MF	(Germany) GER	Thomas Hitzlsperger	26	2	24+2	2	0	0
13	MF	(Germany) GER	Christian Tiffert	28	3	25+3	3	0	0
14	MF	(Croatia) CRO	Mario Carević	6	0	1+5	0	0	0
20	MF	(Croatia) CRO	Zvonimir Soldo	31	0	31	0	0	0
22	MF	(Denmark) DEN	Jesper Grønkjær	25	0	16+9	0	0	0
40	MF	(Germany) GER	Christian Gentner	23	1	15+8	1	0	0
Forwards
9	FW	(Switzerland) SUI	Marco Streller	7	1	3+4	1	0	0
10	FW	(Denmark) DEN	Jon Dahl Tomasson	26	8	25+1	8	0	0
18	FW	(Brazil) BRA	Cacau	20	4	8+12	4	0	0
33	FW	(Germany) GER	Mario Gómez	30	6	7+23	6	0	0
38	FW	(Serbia and Montenegro) SCG	Danijel Ljuboja	26	8	23+3	8	0	0

== Competitions ==
=== Bundesliga ===
==== League table ====
Pos	Team	Pld	W	D	L	GF	GA	GD	Pts
7	Borussia Dortmund	34	11	13	10	45	42	+3	46
8	1. FC Nürnberg	34	12	8	14	49	51	−2	44
9	VfB Stuttgart	34	9	16	9	37	39	−2	43
10	Borussia Mönchengladbach	34	10	12	12	42	50	−8	42
11	Mainz 05	34	9	11	14	46	47	−1	38

Source: kicker.de
Rules for classification: 1) points; 2) goal difference; 3) number of goals scored.

==== Matches ====
6 August 2005 1	MSV Duisburg	1–1	VfB Stuttgart	Duisburg
15:30 CEST (UTC+2)	Ahanfouf 31'	Report	Cacau 5'	Stadium: Schwarzwald-Stadion; Attendance: 28,443; Referee: Felix Brych

14 August 2005 2	VfB Stuttgart	2–3	Köln	Stuttgart
17:30 CEST (UTC+2)	Streller 58'; Tiffert 69'	Report	Feulner 9'; Streit 47'; Podolski 55'	Stadium: Gottlieb-Daimler-Stadion; Attendance: 49,000; Referee: Michael Weiner

27 August 2005 3	Werder Bremen	1–1	VfB Stuttgart	Bremen
15:30 CEST (UTC+2)	Klasnić 41'	Report	Tomasson 50'	Stadium: Weser-Stadion; Attendance: 38,440; Referee: Herbert Fandel

10 September 2005 4	VfB Stuttgart	1–1	Arminia Bielefeld	Stuttgart
15:30 CEST (UTC+2)	Tomasson 58'	Report	Pinto 79'	Stadium: Gottlieb-Daimler-Stadion; Attendance: 34,000; Referee: Babak Rafati

17 September 2005 5	Mainz 05	1–2	VfB Stuttgart	Mainz
15:30 CEST (UTC+2)	Noveski 77'	Report	Tomasson 76'; Gómez 88'	Stadium: Opel Arena; Attendance: 20,300; Referee: Peter Gagelmann

21 September 2005 6	VfB Stuttgart	1–2	Hamburger SV	Stuttgart
20:00 CEST (UTC+2)	Gómez 53'	Report	Van der Vaart 32'; Jarolím 88'	Stadium: Gottlieb-Daimler-Stadion; Attendance: 34,000; Referee: Helmut Fleischer

25 September 2005 7	VfB Stuttgart	1–0	Kaiserslautern	Stuttgart
17:30 CEST (UTC+2)	Tomasson 10'	Report		Stadium: Gottlieb-Daimler-Stadion; Attendance: 35,000; Referee: Thorsten Kinhöfer

2 October 2005 8	Borussia Dortmund	0–0	VfB Stuttgart	Dortmund
17:30 CEST (UTC+2)		Report		Stadium: Westfalenstadion; Attendance: 73,100; Referee: Florian Meyer

15 October 2005 9	VfB Stuttgart	1–1	Borussia Mönchengladbach	Stuttgart
15:30 CEST (UTC+2)	Strasser 89' (o.g.)	Report	Kluge 17'	Stadium: Gottlieb-Daimler-Stadion; Attendance: 45,000; Referee: Jochen Drees

23 October 2005 10	Bayer Leverkusen	1–1	VfB Stuttgart	Leverkusen
17:30 CEST (UTC+2)	Barnetta 56'	Report	Ljuboja 71' (pen.)	Stadium: BayArena; Attendance: 22,500; Referee: Günter Perl

29 October 2005 11	VfB Stuttgart	3–3	Hertha BSC	Stuttgart
15:30 CEST (UTC+2)	Ljuboja 52'; Cacau 66'; Gómez 84'	Report	Cairo 8'; Rafael 67'; Paraíba 76'	Stadium: Gottlieb-Daimler-Stadion; Attendance: 40,000; Referee: Felix Brych

6 November 2005 12	Nürnberg	0–1	VfB Stuttgart	Nuremberg
17:30 CEST (UTC+2)		Report	Tiffert 10'	Stadium: Max-Morlock-Stadion; Attendance: 25,860; Referee: Florian Meyer

20 November 2005 13	VfB Stuttgart	2–2	Hannover 96	Stuttgart
17:30 CEST (UTC+2)	Tomasson 11', 68'	Report	Hashemian 57'; Yankov 69'	Stadium: Gottlieb-Daimler-Stadion; Attendance: 36,000; Referee: Peter Sippel

27 November 2005 14	Eintracht Frankfurt	1–1	VfB Stuttgart	Frankfurt
17:30 CEST (UTC+2)	Amanatidis 19'	Report	Ljuboja 62'	Stadium: Commerzbank-Arena; Attendance: 41,500; Referee: Babak Rafati

3 December 2005 15	VfB Stuttgart	0–0	Bayern Munich	Stuttgart
15:30 CEST (UTC+2)		Report		Stadium: Gottlieb-Daimler-Stadion; Attendance: 55,000; Referee: Markus Merk

10 December 2005 16	VfL Wolfsburg	0–1	VfB Stuttgart	Wolfsburg
15:30 CEST (UTC+2)		Report	Meißner 62'	Stadium: Volkswagen Arena; Attendance: 23,686; Referee: Herbert Fandel

17 December 2005 17	VfB Stuttgart	2–0	Schalke 04	Stuttgart
15:30 CEST (UTC+2)	Gómez 48'; Ljuboja 67'	Report		Stadium: Gottlieb-Daimler-Stadion; Attendance: 48,000; Referee: Wolfgang Stark

28 January 2006 18	VfB Stuttgart	0–1	MSV Duisburg	Stuttgart
15:30 CEST (UTC+2)		Report	Caligiuri 33'	Stadium: Gottlieb-Daimler-Stadion; Attendance: 31,000; Referee: Peter Gagelmann

4 February 2006 19	Köln	0–0	VfB Stuttgart	Cologne
15:30 CEST (UTC+2)		Report		Stadium: RheinEnergieStadion; Attendance: 47,500; Referee: Lutz Wagner

8 February 2006 20	VfB Stuttgart	0–0	Werder Bremen	Stuttgart
20:00 CEST (UTC+2)		Report		Stadium: Gottlieb-Daimler-Stadion; Attendance: 30,000; Referee: Wolfgang Stark

11 February 2006 21	Arminia Bielefeld	2–1	VfB Stuttgart	Bielefeld
15:30 CEST (UTC+2)	Boakye 31', 50'	Report	Magnin 37'	Stadium: Bielefelder Alm; Attendance: 17,728; Referee: Babak Rafati

19 February 2006 22	VfB Stuttgart	2–1	Mainz 05	Stuttgart
17:30 CEST (UTC+2)	Ljuboja 7'; Tiffert 71'	Report	Antônio da Silva 25'	Stadium: Gottlieb-Daimler-Stadion; Attendance: 28,000; Referee: Florian Meyer

26 February 2006 23	Hamburger SV	0–2	VfB Stuttgart	Hamburg
17:30 CEST (UTC+2)		Report	Meißner 43'; Gómez 90+1'	Stadium: Volksparkstadion; Attendance: 51,821; Referee: Markus Merk

7 March 2006 24	Kaiserslautern	1–1	VfB Stuttgart	Kaiserslautern
18:00 CEST (UTC+2)	Altintop 15'	Report	Gómez 90+3'	Stadium: Fritz-Walter-Stadion; Attendance: 30,593; Referee: Helmut Fleischer

11 March 2006 25	VfB Stuttgart	0–0	Borussia Dortmund	Stuttgart
15:30 CEST (UTC+2)		Report		Stadium: Gottlieb-Daimler-Stadion; Attendance: 45,000; Referee: Michael Weiner

18 March 2006 26	Borussia Mönchengladbach	1–1	VfB Stuttgart	Mönchengladbach
15:30 CEST (UTC+2)	Fukal 69'	Report	Cacau 75'	Stadium: Borussia-Park; Attendance: 45,552; Referee: Thorsten Kinhöfer

25 March 2006 27	VfB Stuttgart	0–2	Bayer Leverkusen	Stuttgart
15:30 CEST (UTC+2)		Report	Freier 30'; Berbatov 88'	Stadium: Gottlieb-Daimler-Stadion; Attendance: 32,000; Referee: Franz-Xaver Wack

1 April 2006 28	Hertha BSC	2–0	VfB Stuttgart	Berlin
15:30 CEST (UTC+2)	Paraíba 46', 69' (pen.)	Report		Stadium: Olympiastadion; Attendance: 51,436; Referee: Florian Meyer

8 April 2006 29	VfB Stuttgart	1–0	Nürnberg	Stuttgart
15:30 CEST (UTC+2)	Tomasson 80'	Report		Stadium: Gottlieb-Daimler-Stadion; Attendance: 37,000; Referee: Lutz Wagner

16 April 2006 30	Hannover 96	3–3	VfB Stuttgart	Hanover
17:30 CEST (UTC+2)	Balitsch 2'; Stajner 33'; Mertesacker 67'	Report	Ljuboja 52'; Hitzlsperger 77'; Tomasson 82'	Stadium: AWD-Arena; Attendance: 36,298; Referee: Felix Brych

22 April 2006 31	VfB Stuttgart	0–2	Eintracht Frankfurt	Stuttgart
15:30 CEST (UTC+2)		Report	Meier 59'; Amanatidis 61' (pen.)	Stadium: Gottlieb-Daimler-Stadion; Attendance: 56,700; Referee: Wolfgang Stark

3 May 2006 32	Bayern Munich	3–1	VfB Stuttgart	Munich
20:00 CEST (UTC+2)	Santa Cruz 11'; Pizarro 44'; Schweinsteiger 46'	Report	Ljuboja 6'	Stadium: Allianz Arena; Attendance: 69,000; Referee: Lutz Wagner

6 May 2006 33	VfB Stuttgart	2–1	VfL Wolfsburg	Stuttgart
15:30 CEST (UTC+2)	Ljuboja 17' (pen.); Gentner 70'	Report	Juan Carlos Menseguez 5'	Stadium: Gottlieb-Daimler-Stadion; Attendance: 31,000; Referee: Peter Sippel

13 May 2006 34	Schalke 04	3–2	VfB Stuttgart	Gelsenkirchen
15:30 CEST (UTC+2)	Sand 53'; Bordon 80'; Waldoch 83'	Report	Hitzlsperger 33'; Cacau 71'	Stadium: Arena AufSchalke; Attendance: 61,524; Referee: Peter Gagelmann

=== DFB-Pokal ===
21 August 2005 First round	1899 Hoffenheim	3–4 (a.e.t.)	VfB Stuttgart	Sinsheim
14:30	Ollhoff 13'; Cescutti 45'; Örüm 120'	report (in German)	Meißner 37'; Tomasson 54'; Carević 100'; Cacau 117'	Stadium: Dietmar-Hopp-Stadion; Attendance: 5,000; Referee: Günter Perl (Munich)

26 October 2005 Second round	Hansa Rostock	3–2	VfB Stuttgart	Rostock
19:30	Schied 16'; Prica 28'; Arvidsson 41'	report (in German)	Hitzlsperger 3'; Ljuboja 82'	Stadium: Ostseestadion; Attendance: 13,000; Referee: Franz-Xaver Wack (Biberbach)

=== UEFA Cup ===
==== First round ====
15 September 2005 First leg	Stuttgart (Germany)	2–0	(Slovenia) Domžale	Stuttgart
16:30	Tomasson 6'; Gentner 88'	Report		Stadium: Gottlieb-Daimler-Stadion; Attendance: 10,000; Referee: Paolo Bertini (Italy)

29 September 2005 Second leg	Domžale (Slovenia)	1–0 (1–2 agg.)	(Germany) Stuttgart	Domžale
14:15	Stevanović 16'	Report		Stadium: Sports Park; Referee: Jacek Granat (Poland)

==== Group stage ====
Pos	Team	Pld	W	D	L	GF	GA	GD	Pts	Qualification
1	(Romania) Rapid București	4	3	0	1	5	2	+3	9	Advance to knockout stage
2	(Ukraine) Shakhtar Donetsk	4	3	0	1	4	1	+3	9	Advance to knockout stage
3	(Germany) Stuttgart	4	3	0	1	6	4	+2	9	Advance to knockout stage
4	(Greece) PAOK	4	1	0	3	6	5	+1	3	
5	(France) Rennes	4	0	0	4	1	10	−9	0	

Source: UEFA

20 October 2005 1	Rennes (France)	0–2	(Germany) Stuttgart	Rennes
18:15		Report	Tomasson 87'; Ljuboja 90' (pen.)	Stadium: Stade de la Route de Lorient; Attendance: 22,847; Referee: Mike Dean (England)

3 November 2005 2	Stuttgart (Germany)	0–2	(Ukraine) Shakhtar Donetsk	Stuttgart
20:45		Report	Fernandinho 31'; Marica 88'	Stadium: Gottlieb-Daimler-Stadion; Attendance: 15,200; Referee: Tommy Skjerven (Norway)

24 November 2005 3	PAOK (Greece)	1–2	(Germany) Stuttgart	Thessaloniki
17:00	Karipidis 48'	Report	Ljuboja 85', 90+1' (pen.)	Stadium: Toumba Stadium; Attendance: 29,000; Referee: Carlos Megía Dávila (Spain)

14 December 2005 4	Stuttgart (Germany)	2–1	(Romania) Rapid București	Stuttgart
20:45	Gómez 20', 37'	Report	Burdujan 80'	Stadium: Gottlieb-Daimler-Stadion; Attendance: 14,000; Referee: Domenico Messina (Italy)

==== Knockout phase ====
===== Round of 32 =====
15 February 2006 First leg	Stuttgart (Germany)	1–2	(England) Middlesbrough	Stuttgart
20:45	Ljuboja 86'	Report	Hasselbaink 20'; Parnaby 46'	Stadium: Gottlieb-Daimler-Stadion; Attendance: 21,000; Referee: Alain Hamer (Luxembourg)

23 February 2006 Second leg	Middlesbrough (England)	0–1 (2a–2 agg.)	(Germany) Stuttgart	Middlesbrough
20:45		Report	Tiffert 13'	Stadium: Riverside Stadium; Attendance: 24,018; Referee: Eric Braamhaar (Netherlands)
