= Kevin Kurányi =

German footballer (born 1982)

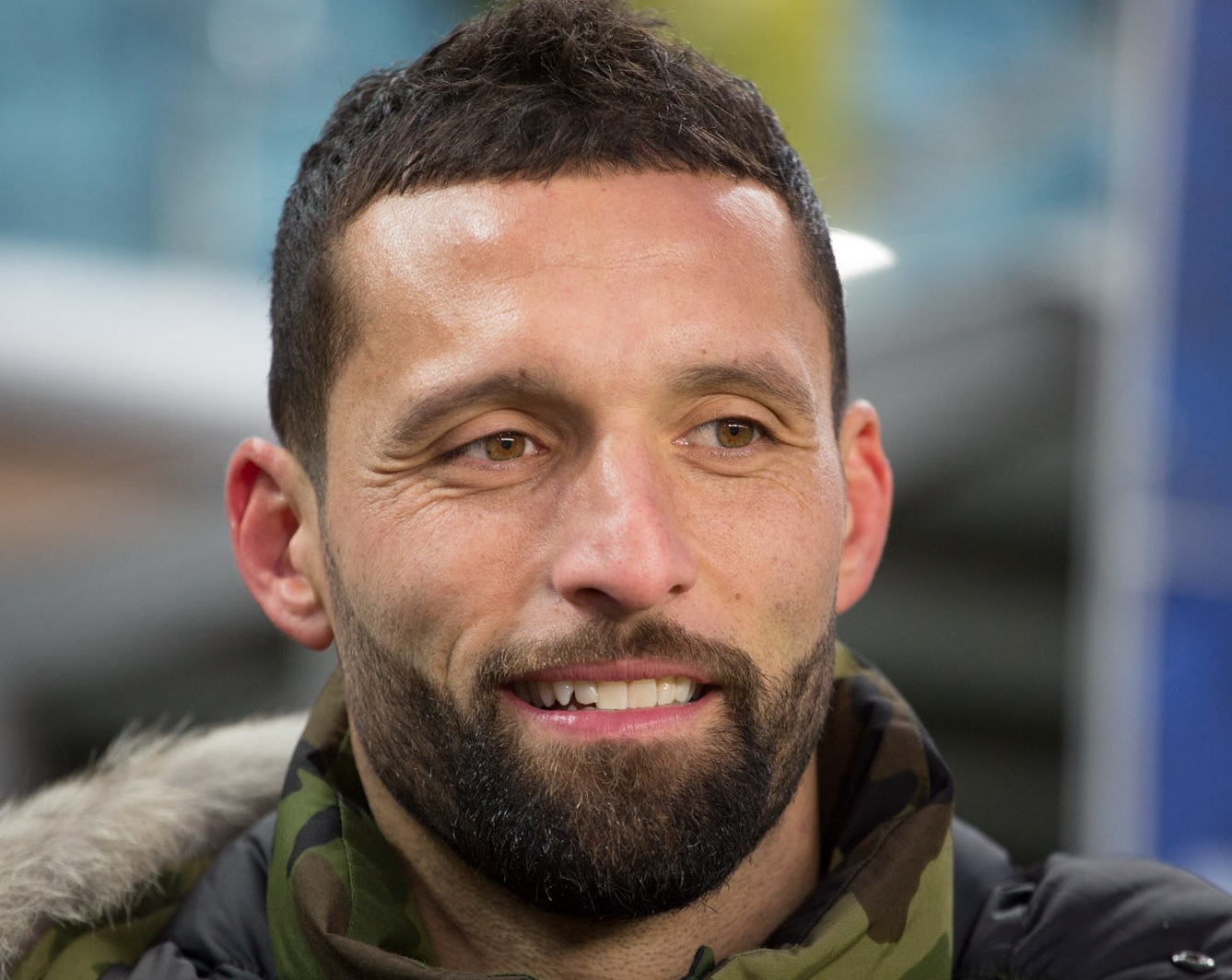
- Kurányi in 2016

Personal information
- Full name: Kevin Dennis Kurányi Rodríguez
- Date of birth: 2 March 1982 (age 44)
- Place of birth: Rio de Janeiro, Brazil
- Height: 1.90 m (6 ft 3 in)
- Position: Striker

Youth career
- 1988–1993: Serrano
- 1993–1994: Las Promesas FC (Panama)
- 1994–1996: Serrano
- 1996–1997: Las Promesas FC
- 1997–2001: VfB Stuttgart

Senior career*
Years	Team	Apps	(Gls)
2000–2002	VfB Stuttgart II	33	(10)
2001–2005	VfB Stuttgart	99	(40)
2005–2010	Schalke 04	162	(71)
2010–2015	Dynamo Moscow	123	(50)
2015–2016	1899 Hoffenheim	14	(0)
Total		431	(171)

International career
2001	Germany U20	5	(2)
2002–2003	Germany U21	6	(2)
2002	Germany Team 2006	1	(1)
2003–2008	Germany	52	(19)
Medal record
Men's football
Representing Germany
FIFA Confederations Cup
Bronze medal – third place	2005 Germany
UEFA European Championship
Runner-up	2008 Austria - Switzerland
- * Club domestic league appearances and goals

Kevin Dennis Kurányi Rodríguez (German pronunciation: [ˈkɛvɪn kuˈʁaːniː], Hungarian: [ˈkɛvin ˈkuraːɲi]; born 2 March 1982) is a former professional footballer who played as a striker. Born in Brazil, he played for the Germany national team. He was known for his great aerial ability and finishing skills.

Kurányi played youth football in Brazil and Panama before joining VfB Stuttgart in Germany where he made his senior debut in 2001. In 2005, he joined Schalke 04. After five seasons there, he joined Dynamo Moscow in Russia. He returned to Germany Hoffenheim in 2015, playing one season before retiring from professional football. He amassed 275 games and 111 goals in the Bundesliga.

From 2003 to 2008, Kurányi was part of the Germany national team, for which he scored 19 goals in 52 games. He participated in two UEFA European Championships and one FIFA Confederations Cup.

== Early life ==
Kurányi was born in Rio de Janeiro, Brazil, to a German father of Hungarian descent and a Panamanian mother. He eventually opted to play for the Germany national team after being also qualified to play for Brazil, Panama or Hungary.

== Club career ==
=== Early career ===
Kurányi began playing football in 1988 for Petrópolis-based Serrano FC in Brazil, when he was six years old. In 1993, he transferred to Panamanian club Las Promesas, where he played for one year before going back to Serrano FC. Kurányi returned to Las Promesas in 1996 for a further year.

=== VfB Stuttgart ===
In 1997, Kurányi moved to Germany, enlisting at VfB Stuttgart's B youth team. After playing a few games in the Germany national under-21 football team, he signed his first professional contract for VfB in 2001.

Following on from his 33 matches and 10 goals for the amateur team, Kurányi played 99 matches for VfB Stuttgart's professional team, scoring 40 goals. He also took part in 22 European team championship games, scoring 10 goals. In the 2002–03 season of the Bundesliga, he was the top German goal-scorer and one of the main reasons for Stuttgart's second-place finish in the league. That year, VfB and its "Junge Wilde" ("young wild ones"), comprising Timo Hildebrand, Andreas Hinkel, Alexander Hleb, Philipp Lahm, Imre Szabics and Kurányi, delighted Stuttgart fans with superb attacking football.

=== Schalke 04 ===
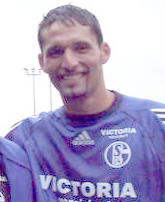
Kurányi with Schalke

Kurányi left Stuttgart during the 2005 summer transfer window to join Schalke, signing to 2009–10. At Gelsenkirchen, he finished top goalscorer for the team from 2005 to 2008, while the team achieved three consecutive UEFA Champions League berths.

On 15 April 2008, Kurányi scored four goals in Schalke's 5–0 win over Energie Cottbus in a league match, the other being an own goal. Three days earlier, incidentally, Schalke were beaten 5–1 at Werder Bremen, with Kurányi also netting.

=== Dynamo Moscow ===
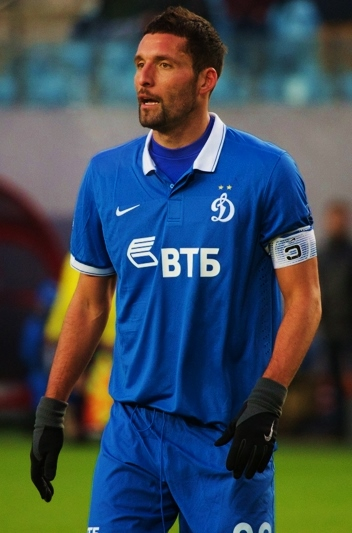
Kurányi captaining Dynamo Moscow

On 9 May 2010, it was announced that Kurányi would move to Dynamo Moscow on 1 July 2010 and signed a three-year contract. After renewing his contract with Dynamo until 2015, he became captain of the team in July 2012. He netted two goals for Dynamo on 9 December 2012, to lift the capital club to a 2–1 victory over Terek Grozny.

=== 1899 Hoffenheim ===
After his contract with Dynamo expired in the summer of 2015, Kurányi returned to Germany and signed for 1899 Hoffenheim on 24 July 2015, on a one-year deal.

Kurányi announced his retirement on 24 March 2017.

== International career ==
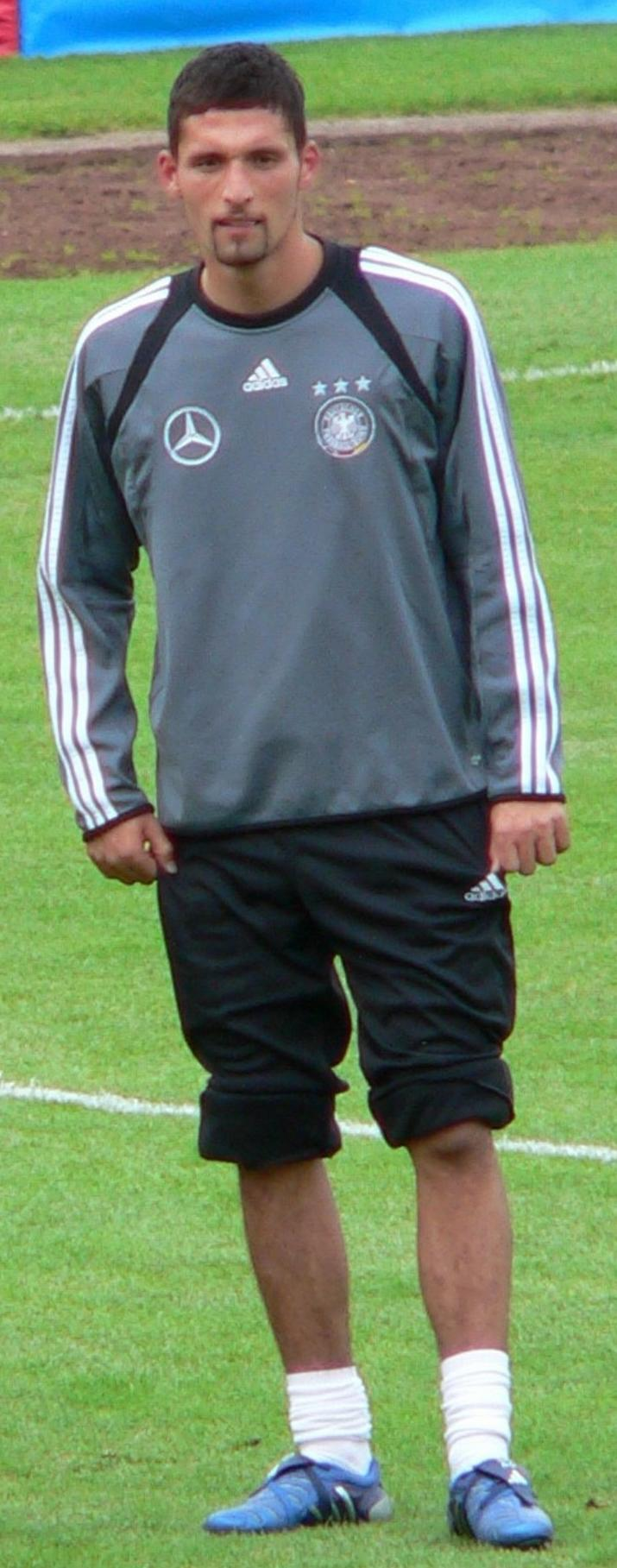
Kurányi with the Germany national team in 2005

Kurányi made his debut for Germany during the Euro 2004 qualifier against Lithuania on 29 March 2003. In his sixth appearance, the young striker netted Germany's final qualifying goal in their 3–0 defeat of Iceland. He played for his adopted country at the tournament's finals and at the 2005 Confederations Cup but was not selected for the 2006 World Cup in Germany.

In 2006–07, Kurányi regained his touch and after an absence of 15 months, he was recalled to the national team, scoring during Germany's 3–1 win against Switzerland on 7 February 2007, in a friendly in Düsseldorf. In Germany's Euro 2008 qualifying match against the Czech Republic on 24 March, he scored both goals in the 2–1 victory. He was brought on during the second half of the Euro 2008 final against Spain for Thomas Hitzlsperger, but was unable to score in the 0–1 loss, receiving a yellow card in the process. Incidentally, the appearance in the final marked his 50th cap for Germany.

On 11 October 2008, Kurányi was left out of the 18-man squad to face Russia. After watching the first half from the stands with other unselected players, he left the stadium during the half-time interval and failed to return to the German team hotel. After this incident, German team coach Joachim Löw said that he would never again select Kurányi for the national team. One of his advisors said of the incident to reporters "He decided what he for himself found to be right, which was to say I'm going home."

== Personal life ==
Due to his mixed descent, Kurányi holds German, Panamanian and Brazilian citizenships. Kurányi has stated that he is an avid supporter of his favorite team, Brazilian side Flamengo.

His son Karlo joined the under-19 squad of VfB Stuttgart in 2022 and the Panama national under-20 team in 2025.

== Career statistics ==
=== Club ===
Appearances and goals by club, season and competition
Club	Season	League			National cup (Note: Includes DFB-Pokal, Russian Cup)		League cup (Note: Includes DFL-Ligapokal)		Continental		Total	
Club	Season	League	Apps	Goals	Apps	Goals	Apps	Goals	Apps	Goals	Apps	Goals
VfB Stuttgart II	2000–01	Regionalliga Süd	8	1	1	0	—		—		9	1
VfB Stuttgart II	2001–02	Regionalliga Süd	25	9	1	0	—		—		26	9
VfB Stuttgart II	Total		33	10	2	0	0	0	0	0	35	10
VfB Stuttgart	2001–02	Bundesliga	5	1	1	1	—		—		6	2
VfB Stuttgart	2002–03	Bundesliga	32	15	2	2	—		9 (Note: Appearances in UEFA Cup)	5	43	22
VfB Stuttgart	2003–04	Bundesliga	33	11	2	1	1	0	8 (Note: Appearances in UEFA Champions League)	3	44	15
VfB Stuttgart	2004–05	Bundesliga	29	13	2	2	2	0	6	3	39	18
VfB Stuttgart	Total		99	40	7	6	3	0	23	11	132	57
Schalke 04	2005–06	Bundesliga	30	10	2	0	2	1	12 (Note: Six appearances and two goals in UEFA Champions League, six appearances and one goal in UEFA Cup)	3	46	14
Schalke 04	2006–07	Bundesliga	34	15	2	2	—		2	0	38	17
Schalke 04	2007–08	Bundesliga	32	15	2	2	2	0	8	3	44	20
Schalke 04	2008–09	Bundesliga	33	13	4	2	—		7	1	44	16
Schalke 04	2009–10	Bundesliga	33	18	4	2	—		—		37	20
Schalke 04	Total		162	71	14	8	4	1	29	7	209	87
Dynamo Moscow	2010	Russian Premier League	16	9	0	0	—		—		16	9
Dynamo Moscow	2011–12	Russian Premier League	41	13	6	0	—		—		47	13
Dynamo Moscow	2012–13	Russian Premier League	27	10	3	1	—		4 (Note: Appearances in UEFA Europa League)	0	34	11
Dynamo Moscow	2013–14	Russian Premier League	15	8	0	0	—		—		15	8
Dynamo Moscow	2014–15	Russian Premier League	24	10	1	0	—		14	5	39	15
Dynamo Moscow	Total		123	50	10	1	0	0	18	5	151	56
1899 Hoffenheim	2015–16	Bundesliga	14	0	1	0	—		—		15	0
Career total			431	171	34	15	7	1	70	23	542	210

=== International ===
National team	Year	Friendlies		Competition		Total	
National team	Year	App	Goals	App	Goals	App	Goals
Germany
Germany	2003	3	0	4	1	7	1
Germany	2004	10	10	3	0	13	10
Germany	2005	10	1	5	2	15	3
Germany	2006	0	0	0	0	0	0
Germany	2007	3	2	6	3	9	5
Germany	2008	4	0	4	0	8	0
Career total		30	13	22	6	52	19

International goals

#	Date	Venue	Opponent	Score	Result	Competition
1.	11 October 2003	AOL Arena, Hamburg, Germany	Iceland	3–0	3–0	UEFA Euro 2004 qualifying
2.	31 March 2004	RheinEnergieStadion, Cologne, Germany	Belgium	1–0	3–0	Friendly
3.	2 June 2004	St. Jakob-Park, Basel, Switzerland	Switzerland	1–0	2–0	Friendly
4.	2 June 2004	St. Jakob-Park, Basel, Switzerland	Switzerland	2–0	2–0	Friendly
5.	18 August 2004	Ernst-Happel-Stadion, Vienna, Austria	Austria	1–0	3–1	Friendly
6.	18 August 2004	Ernst-Happel-Stadion, Vienna, Austria	Austria	2–1	3–1	Friendly
7.	18 August 2004	Ernst-Happel-Stadion, Vienna, Austria	Austria	3–1	3–1	Friendly
8.	8 September 2004	Olympic Stadium, Berlin, Germany	Brazil	1–1	1–1	Friendly
9.	17 November 2004	Zentralstadion, Leipzig, Germany	Cameroon	1–0	3–0	Friendly
10.	21 December 2004	Rajamangala Stadium, Bangkok, Thailand	Thailand	1–0	5–1	Friendly
11.	21 December 2004	Rajamangala Stadium, Bangkok, Thailand	Thailand	2–0	5–1	Friendly
12.	9 February 2005	LTU Arena, Düsseldorf, Germany	Argentina	2–1	2–2	Friendly
13.	15 June 2005	Waldstadion, Frankfurt, Germany	Australia	1–0	4–3	FIFA Confederations Cup 2005
14.	21 June 2005	Frankenstadion, Nuremberg, Germany	Argentina	1–0	2–2	FIFA Confederations Cup 2005
15.	7 February 2007	LTU Arena, Düsseldorf, Germany	Switzerland	1–0	3–1	Friendly
16.	24 March 2007	Synot Tip Arena, Prague, Czech Republic	Czech Republic	1–0	2–1	UEFA Euro 2008 qualifying
17.	24 March 2007	Synot Tip Arena, Prague, Czech Republic	Czech Republic	2–0	2–1	UEFA Euro 2008 qualifying
18.	2 June 2007	Frankenstadion, Nuremberg, Germany	San Marino	1–0	6–0	UEFA Euro 2008 qualifying
19.	22 August 2007	Wembley Stadium, London	England	1–1	2–1	Friendly

== Honours ==
VfB Stuttgart

- UEFA Intertoto Cup: 2002

Schalke 04

- DFL-Ligapokal: 2005

Germany

- FIFA Confederations Cup third place: 2005
- UEFA European Championship runner-up: 2008

Individual

- kicker Bundesliga Team of the Season: 2006–07, 2009–10
