= Christian Tiffert =

German footballer (born 1982)

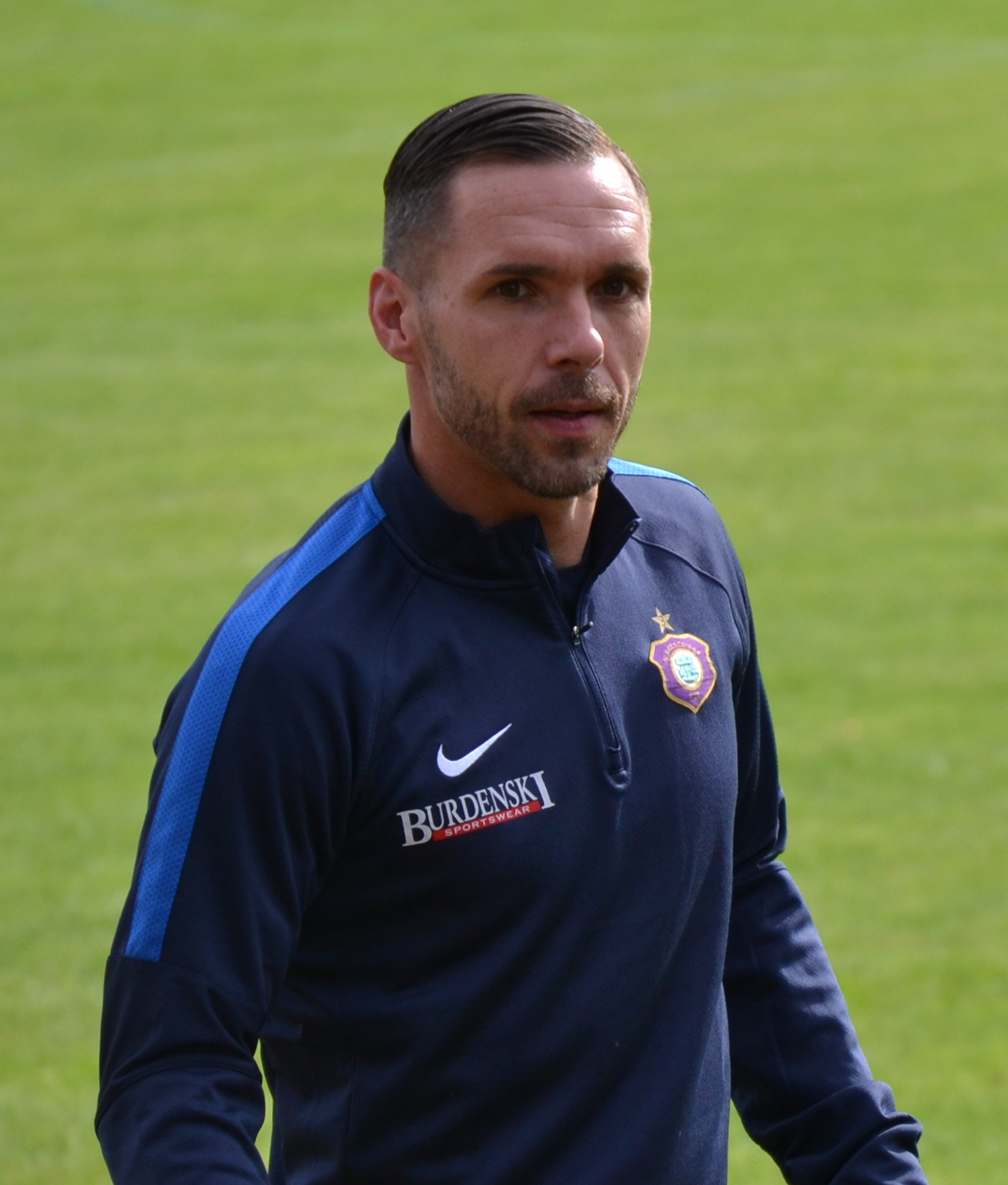
- Tiffert training with Erzgebirge Aue in 2016

Personal information
- Date of birth: 18 February 1982 (age 44)
- Place of birth: Halle an der Saale, East Germany
- Height: 1.83 m (6 ft 0 in)
- Position: Midfielder

Team information
- Current team: Chemnitzer FC (manager)

Youth career
- 1988–1991: Chemie Halle
- 1991–1997: Hallescher FC
- 1998–2000: Tennis Borussia Berlin

Senior career*
Years	Team	Apps	(Gls)
2000	Tennis Borussia Berlin	8	(2)
2000–2004	VfB Stuttgart II	17	(5)
2000–2006	VfB Stuttgart	136	(9)
2006–2007	Red Bull Salzburg	18	(1)
2007–2010	MSV Duisburg	75	(5)
2008–2010	MSV Duisburg II	5	(0)
2010–2012	1. FC Kaiserslautern	64	(4)
2012–2013	Seattle Sounders FC	12	(0)
2013–2014	VfL Bochum	24	(0)
2015–2019	Erzgebirge Aue	104	(0)
2019	Hallescher FC	3	(0)
Total		466	(26)

International career
2001	Germany U20	4	(0)
2002–2004	Germany U21	24	(2)

Managerial career
- 2019–2022: Chemnitzer FC (assistant)
- 2022–2024: Chemnitzer FC
Medal record
Germany U-18
Third place	UEFA U-18 Championship	2000
VfB Stuttgart
Winner	UEFA Intertoto Cup	2000
Winner	UEFA Intertoto Cup	2002
Runner-up	Bundesliga	2002–03
Runner-up	DFB-Ligapokal	2005
FC Red Bull Salzburg
Winner	Bundesliga	2006–07
- * Club domestic league appearances and goals

Christian Tiffert (German pronunciation: [ˈkʁɪsti̯a(ː)n ˈtɪfɐt]; born 18 February 1982) is a German football manager and a former midfielder. He was most recently the manager of Chemnitzer FC.

== Career ==
=== 1. FC Kaiserslautern ===
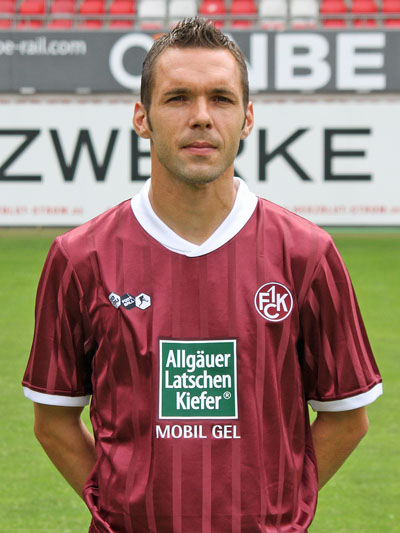
Tiffert with 1. FC Kaiserslautern in 2010

On 8 April 2010, he signed with 1. FC Kaiserslautern for the 2010–11 Bundesliga season. During his time with Kaiserslautern, Tiffert led the Bundesliga in assists with 17 in the 2010–11 season.

=== Seattle Sounders FC ===
Tiffert was signed as a Designated Player for Major League Soccer club Seattle Sounders FC on 27 July 2012, confirming earlier interest and attendance during a game against Sporting Kansas City on 20 June. He replaced Uruguayan international Álvaro Fernández, who was traded to the Chicago Fire. He made his debut on 5 August 2012, playing for 26 minutes during a 4–0 victory over the Los Angeles Galaxy, replacing Brad Evans in front of an attendance of 61,000 at CenturyLink Field. Tiffert started throughout the Sounders' games in August, including a loss on penalties to Sporting Kansas City in the U.S. Open Cup Final, including a saved penalty against Tiffert. The German midfielder provided his first assist for the Sounders during 6–2 win over C.D. Chivas USA, crossing into the path of a header from Sammy Ochoa, at the Home Depot Center on 25 August. Tiffert's free kick to Eddie Johnson gave him a second career assist for the Sounders, over Chivas USA at home on 8 September. Tiffert played for four minutes against Caledonia AIA in Trinidad and Tobago in the CONCACAF Champions League on 31 August. He was unused during a 1–1 draw with the Portland Timbers due to an ankle injury the week before. Tiffert returned against the San Jose Earthquakes on 22 September and Tiffert started the remaining games of the season, recording his third career assist for the Sounders against F.C. Dallas for Brad Evans after a quick free kick from Fredy Montero on 21 October. Tiffert started all four games during the Sounders' MLS Cup Playoff campaign and recorded an assist for defender Zach Scott from a corner kick during a 2–1 win over the Los Angeles Galaxy on 18 November in the Conference Finals, however the Sounders lost 4–2 on aggregate. Tiffert finished his first MLS season with 18 total appearances and 3 assists. He was bought-out of his contract by the club on 2 March 2013.

=== Erzgebirge Aue ===
In November 2017, Tiffert agreed a contract with Erzgebirge Aue which would keep at the club until 2019. He had been at the club since 2015.

== Coaching career ==
Tiffert retired at the end of the 2018–19 season and became a part of the technical staff of Chemnitzer FC in July 2019. On 1 March 2022, Tiffert was promoted to the position of manager by Chemnitzer FC until the end of the season. His first match was a 4–1 win against FSV Luckenwalde. Chemnitzer FC finished the 2021–22 Regionalliga Nordost season in fifth place. Chemnitzer FC started the 2022–23 season with a 2–1 loss in the DFB-Pokal.

== Career statistics ==
Appearances and goals by club, season and competition
Club	Season	League			Cup (Note: Includes German Cup, Austrian Cup, and Lamar Hunt U.S. Open Cup.)		Continental (Note: Includes UEFA Champions League, CONCACAF Champions League, and UEFA Europa League.)		Other (Note: Includes German League Cup, MLS Cup playoffs and 2. Bundesliga relegation playoffs.)		Total		Ref.
Club	Season	League	Apps	Goals	Apps	Goals	Apps	Goals	Apps	Goals	Apps	Goals	Ref.
Tennis Borussia Berlin	1999–2000	2. Bundesliga	8	2	0	0	—		—		8	2	
VfB Stuttgart II	2000–01	Regionalliga Süd	14	3	—		—		—		14	3	
VfB Stuttgart II	2003–04	Regionalliga Süd	1	1	—		—		—		1	1	
VfB Stuttgart II	2004–05	Regionalliga Süd	2	1	—		—		—		2	1	
VfB Stuttgart II	Total		17	5	0	0	0	0	0	0	17	5	—
VfB Stuttgart	2000–01	Bundesliga	6	0	2	1	2	0	—		10	1	
VfB Stuttgart	2001–02	Bundesliga	27	3	2	0	—		—		29	3	
VfB Stuttgart	2002–03	Bundesliga	18	0	2	0	11	3	—		31	3	
VfB Stuttgart	2003–04	Bundesliga	27	2	3	0	8	0	1	0	39	2	
VfB Stuttgart	2004–05	Bundesliga	30	1	2	0	8	1	1	0	41	2	
VfB Stuttgart	2005–06	Bundesliga	28	3	2	0	6	1	2	0	38	4	
VfB Stuttgart	Total		136	9	13	1	35	5	4	0	188	15	—
Red Bull Salzburg	2006–07	Austrian Bundesliga	18	1	1	0	5	1	—		24	2	
MSV Duisburg	2007–08	Bundesliga	25	0	2	0	—		—		27	0	
MSV Duisburg	2008–09	2. Bundesliga	18	1	0	0	—		—		18	1	
MSV Duisburg	2009–10	2. Bundesliga	32	4	3	0	—		—		35	4	
MSV Duisburg	Total		75	5	5	0	0	0	0	0	80	5	—
MSV Duisburg II	2008–09	NRW-Liga	4	0	—		—		—		4	0	
MSV Duisburg II	2009–10	NRW-Liga	1	0	—		—		—		1	0	
MSV Duisburg II	Total		5	0	0	0	0	0	0	0	5	0	—
1. FC Kaiserslautern	2010–11	Bundesliga	33	2	4	0	—		—		37	2	
1. FC Kaiserslautern	2011–12	Bundesliga	31	2	3	1	—		—		34	3	
1. FC Kaiserslautern	Total		64	4	7	1	0	0	0	0	71	5	—
Seattle Sounders FC	2012	MLS	12	0	1	0	1	0	4	0	18	0	
VfL Bochum	2013–14	2. Bundesliga	24	0	1	0	—		—		25	1	
Erzgebirge Aue	2015–16	3. Liga	31	0	2	0	—		—		33	0	
Erzgebirge Aue	2016–17	2. Bundesliga	31	0	1	0	—		—		32	0	
Erzgebirge Aue	2017–18	2. Bundesliga	33	0	1	0	—		2	0	36	0	
Erzgebirge Aue	2018–19	2. Bundesliga	9	0	1	0	0	0	0	0	01	0	
Erzgebirge Aue	Total		104	0	5	0	0	0	2	0	111	0	—
Hallescher FC	2018–19	3. Liga	3	0	0	0	—		—		3	0	
Career total			466	26	33	2	41	6	10	0	550	34	—

== Coaching record ==
As of match played 30 August 2024

Team	From	To	Record					Ref.
Team	From	To	M	W	D	L	Win %	Ref.
Chemnitzer FC	1 March 2022	2 September 2024	98	44	20	34	44.90	
Total			98	44	20	34	44.90	—

== Honours ==
VfB Stuttgart

- UEFA Intertoto Cup: 2002
