= Jochen Seitz =

German football manager and player (born 1976)

Personal information
- Full name: Jochen Norbert Seitz
- Date of birth: 11 October 1976 (age 50)
- Place of birth: Erlenbach am Main, West Germany
- Height: 1.87 m (6 ft 2 in)
- Positions: Right midfielder; right-back

Team information
- Current team: Wehen Wiesbaden (manager)

Youth career
- 1982–1992: TSV Heimbuchenthal
- 1992–1996: Viktoria Aschaffenburg

Senior career*
Years	Team	Apps	(Gls)
1996–1997	Hamburger SV	4	(0)
1997–2000	SpVgg Unterhaching	87	(12)
2000–2003	VfB Stuttgart	74	(5)
2003–2004	Schalke 04	18	(2)
2004	Schalke 04 II	3	(0)
2004–2005	1. FC Kaiserslautern	32	(4)
2006–2008	TSG Hoffenheim	38	(1)
2009	Alemannia Aachen	5	(0)
2009–2011	Chernomorets Burgas	47	(0)
2011–2016	Bayern Alzenau	93	(1)
Total		401	(25)

International career
	Germany B	4	(0)

Managerial career
- 2014–2016: Bayern Alzenau
- 2016–2023: Viktoria Aschaffenburg
- 2024–2026: 1. FC Lokomotive Leipzig
- 2026–: Wehen Wiesbaden
- * Club domestic league appearances and goals

Jochen Seitz (born 11 October 1976) is a German professional football manager and former player. He currently serves as the manager for Wehen Wiesbaden.

Seitz played professionally in his country for Hamburger SV, SpVgg Unterhaching, VfB Stuttgart, FC Schalke 04, Kaiserslautern, TSG Hoffenheim, Alemannia Aachen and 1. FC Lokomotive Leipzig.. Towards the end of his career, he had a two-year stint at Bulgarian side Chernomorets Burgas.

== Playing career ==
Seitz signed with Bulgarian Chernomorets Burgas for two years on 4 July 2009. He made his team debut a few days later, in a 2–0 friendly win against Chernomorets Pomorie. He left the club on 1 June 2011 after his contract expired.

== Honours ==
VfB Stuttgart

- UEFA Intertoto Cup: 2000, 2002

Schalke 04

- UEFA Intertoto Cup: 2003
