= Timo Wenzel =

German footballer (born 1977)

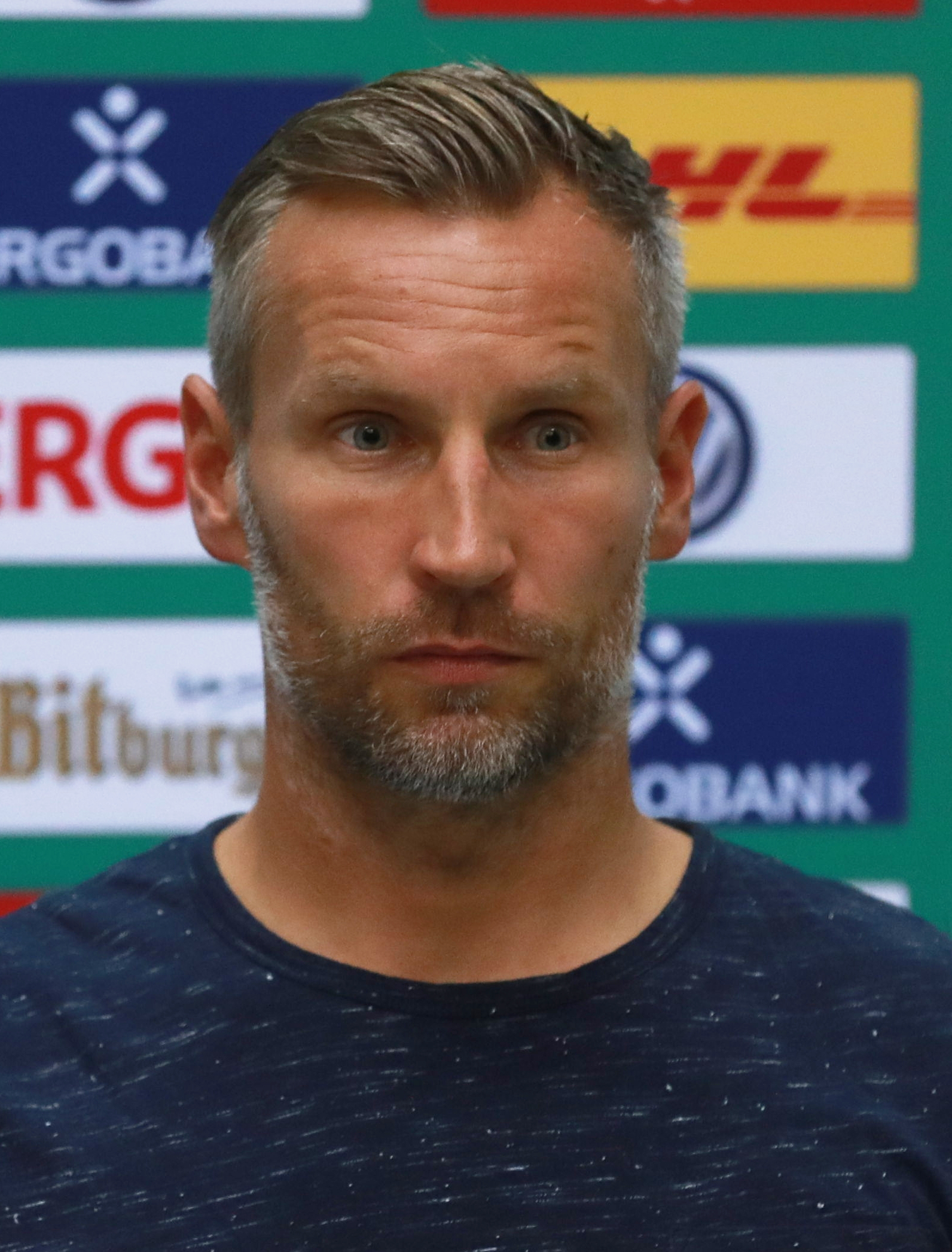
- Wenzel in 2018

Personal information
- Date of birth: 30 November 1977 (age 48)
- Place of birth: Neu-Ulm, West Germany
- Height: 1.85 m (6 ft 1 in)
- Position: Centre back

Youth career
- VfB Stuttgart

Senior career*
Years	Team	Apps	(Gls)
1997–1999	VfB Stuttgart II	58	(6)
2000–2003	VfB Stuttgart	65	(1)
2004–2006	1. FC Kaiserslautern	41	(0)
2006	1. FC Kaiserslautern II	6	(1)
2006–2008	FC Augsburg	51	(1)
2008–2011	AC Omonia	74	(1)
2011–2012	AO Kerkyra	22	(2)
2012–2015	SV Elversberg	82	(5)
Total		399	(17)

International career
2002–2003	Germany Team 2006	3	(0)

Managerial career
- 2015–2017: SV Elversberg II
- 2018–2019: 1. FC Schweinfurt 05
- 2021–2023: FC 08 Homburg
- * Club domestic league appearances and goals

Timo Wenzel (born 30 November 1977) is a German football manager and former player.

== Career ==
Wenzel was born in Neu-Ulm. He appeared in the Bundesliga with VfB Stuttgart, 1. FC Kaiserslautern (January 2004 – 2006) and in the 2. Bundesliga with FC Augsburg. He signed a two-year contract with AC Omonia of the Cypriot First Division on 29 April 2008.

=== Position ===
He is equally adept playing on either the left flank or the centre.

== Honours ==
VfB Stuttgart

- UEFA Intertoto Cup: 2002

Omonia

- Cypriot Championship: 2010
- Cypriot Cup: 2011
- Cypriot Super Cup: 2010
