= Andreas Hinkel =

German footballer (born 1982)

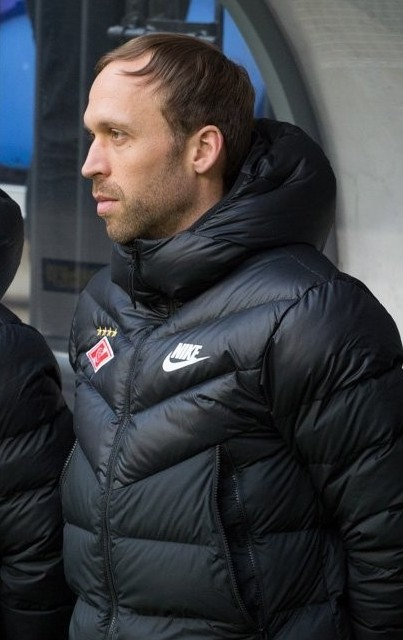
- Hinkel coaching Spartak Moscow in 2020

Personal information
- Date of birth: 26 March 1982 (age 44)
- Place of birth: Backnang, West Germany
- Height: 1.83 m (6 ft 0 in)
- Position: Right-back

Youth career
- 1987–1992: TSV Leutenbach
- 1992–1999: VfB Stuttgart

Senior career*
Years	Team	Apps	(Gls)
1999–2001	VfB Stuttgart II	31	(0)
2000–2006	VfB Stuttgart	156	(1)
2006–2008	Sevilla	15	(0)
2008–2011	Celtic	79	(1)
2011–2012	SC Freiburg	7	(0)
Total		282	(2)

International career
2002–2003	Germany U-21	8	(0)
2002	Germany Team 2006	1	(0)
2003–2009	Germany	21	(0)

Managerial career
- 2013–2014: VfB Stuttgart (U12)
- 2013–2014: VfB Stuttgart (U16 assistant)
- 2014–2015: VfB Stuttgart (U17 assistant)
- 2016: VfB Stuttgart II (assistant)
- 2016: VfB Stuttgart (caretaker assistant)
- 2016–2018: VfB Stuttgart II
- 2018: VfB Stuttgart (caretaker)
- 2019: VfB Stuttgart (assistant)
- 2019: VfB Stuttgart II
- 2019–2021: Spartak Moscow (assistant)
- 2022–2023: RB Leipzig (assistant)
- 2023–2025: Belgium (assistant)
- * Club domestic league appearances and goals

Andreas Hinkel (born 26 March 1982) is a German football coach and a former player. Hinkel played as a right-back and earned 21 caps for the Germany national team. He was known for his attacking play on the flanks and defensive solidity.

He started his career with Bundesliga side VfB Stuttgart in 2000, before moving to La Liga club Sevilla in 2006. In January 2008, he signed for Scottish Premier League club Celtic for £1.9 million. He left Celtic and joined Bundesliga side Freiburg after his contract expired in summer 2011. He had spent the entire 2010–11 season out due to a cruciate ligament injury.

Hinkel played 21 matches for Germany between 2003 and 2009, and was in their squad for Euro 2004.

== Club career ==
=== VfB Stuttgart ===
After finishing second with VfB Stuttgart in the 2002–03 season, and already established as first-choice, Hinkel took part in Champions League for the first time in his career. In March 2004, however, he suffered a knee ligament injury.

=== Sevilla ===
On 23 June 2006, Hinkel signed a four-year contract with Sevilla, where he won the UEFA Cup and the UEFA Super Cup. The transfer fee was estimated to be around €4 million. However, he found himself unable to dislodge Sevilla's regular right-back Daniel Alves.

=== Celtic ===
On 4 January 2008, Hinkel was confirmed as a Celtic player, for a fee of £1.9 million. Hinkel played his first Celtic game in a 3–0 Scottish Cup win over Stirling Albion eight days later, and scored his first goal for Celtic a month later, in a 3–0 win over Hearts at Celtic Park. Celtic won the SPL title on a dramatic last day of the season and earned Hinkel his first league title medal.

The following season, Hinkel won a Scottish League Cup winners medal after a 2–0 win over Rangers in the final.

Hinkel played a vital part in Celtic's Champions League third qualifying round second-leg victory over Russian outfit Dinamo Moscow on 5 August 2009. The match ended 2–0 to the Hoops with Hinkel assisting Scott McDonald for the opener then hitting a long hopeful punt up the pitch which Georgios Samaras latched onto before netting a last-minute winner. The German also cleared two goal-bound Dinamo strikes off the line. Hinkel had 29 SPL matches.

For the first match of the 2010–11 season on 14 August, Hinkel was dropped in favour of new signing Cha Du-Ri. The following week, he suffered an anterior cruciate ligament injury and was ruled out for nine months. He resumed training the following January. On 1 July 2011, Hinkel left Celtic after his contract expired.

=== SC Freiburg ===
On 6 October 2011, SC Freiburg signed Hinkel on a free transfer.

On 10 September 2012, Hinkel announced his immediate retirement.

== International career ==
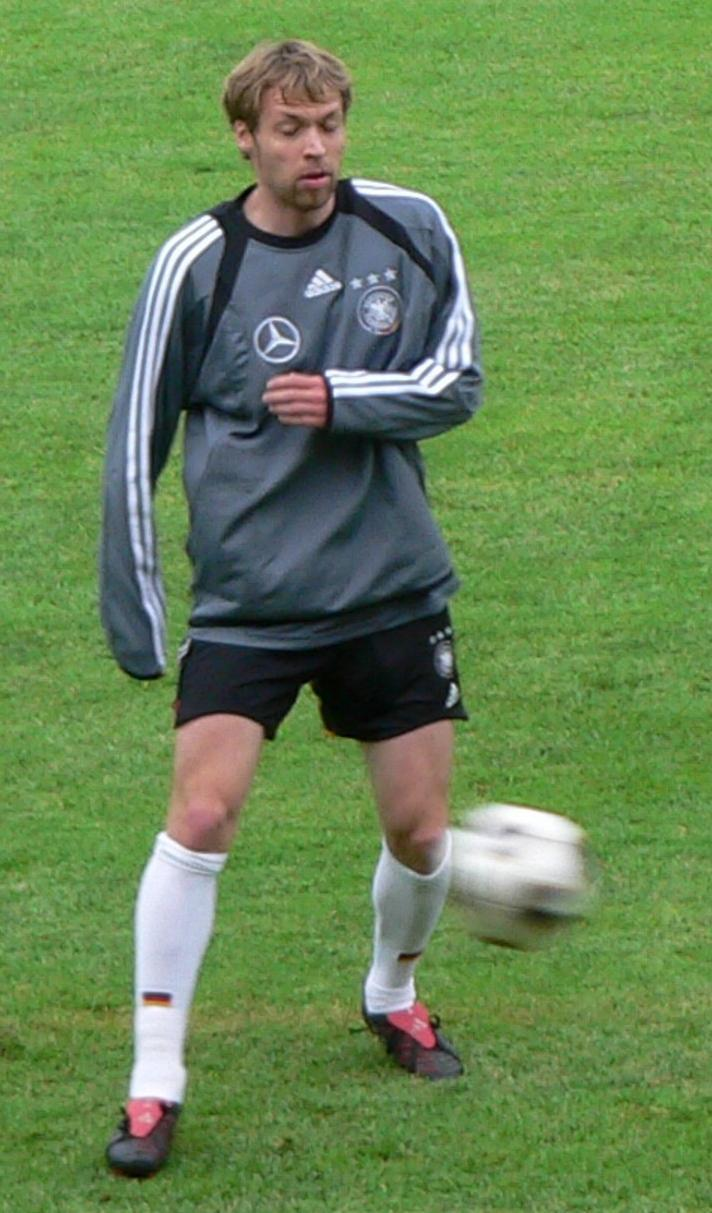
Hinkel with the Germany national team in 2005

Hinkel has represented Germany on 21 occasions at senior level, making his debut in 2003 against Serbia and Montenegro. He was part of the German squad during Euro 2004 (having recovered from aforementioned knee injury), but missed the 2006 World Cup. Hinkel's international involvement was kept to a minimum when at Sevilla due to lack of first-team football and the emergence of Philipp Lahm as first-choice right-back ahead of him. Hinkel was also not called up for Euro 2008 or the 2010 World Cup.

== Managerial career ==
Between 2014 and 2016, Hinkel was an assistant coach in Stuttgart's youth system, the first team, and the reserve team. He started from the 2013/14 season as manager for the U12 team and also as assistant manager for the U16s. In the 2014/15 season, he was the assistant manager of the U17s under manager Domenico Tedesco. At the end of the season, Hinkel and Tedesco unexpectedly left the club, after not receiving new contracts. It was later revealed, that Hinkel had been offered a contract extension, but wasn't satisfied with the esteem he had received.

On 26 January 2016, he returned to Stuttgart as assistant manager for the reserve team. In September 2016, he became assistant manager for the first team for a short period as an interim solution after first team manager Jos Luhukay had left the club. On 19 December 2016, Hinkel became the manager of Stuttgart II. Stuttgart reorganized the reserve team and appointed Hinkel to a new role. Hinkel is also completing a coaching course. He finished with a record of 21 wins, 11 draws, and 17 losses. On 7 October 2018, he was appointed as the interim head coach of VfB Stuttgart until Markus Weinzierl took over as head coach two days later. He did not manage any matches as interim head coach.

In January 2019, Hinkel returned to the club once again, this time as assistant manager of the first team. On 1 April 2019, Hinkel was appointed as the manager of the reserve team following the firing of Marc Kienle.

On 14 October 2019, he joined Russian Premier League club FC Spartak Moscow as an assistant to newly appointed manager Domenico Tedesco. He has taken charge of the team numerous times because of Tedesco's multiple suspensions. He left Spartak at the end of the 2020–21 season after helping to guide them to the UEFA Champions League qualification spot, as Tedesco's contract expired.

== Career statistics ==
=== Club ===
Appearances and goals by club, season and competition
Club	Season	League			National cup		League cup		Europe		Total		Ref.
Club	Season	League	Apps	Goals	Apps	Goals	Apps	Goals	Apps	Goals	Apps	Goals	Ref.
VfB Stuttgart II	2000–01	Regionalliga Süd	19	0	1	0	—		—		20	0	
VfB Stuttgart	2000–01	Bundesliga	10	0	2	0	—		4	0	16	0	
VfB Stuttgart	2001–02	Bundesliga	30	0	3	0	—		—		33	0	
VfB Stuttgart	2002–03	Bundesliga	33	0	2	0	—		12	0	47	0	
VfB Stuttgart	2003–04	Bundesliga	28	0	3	0	1	0	3	0	35	0	
VfB Stuttgart	2004–05	Bundesliga	29	1	2	0	2	0	6	1	39	2	
VfB Stuttgart	2005–06	Bundesliga	26	0	1	0	2	0	3	0	32	0	
VfB Stuttgart	Total		156	1	13	0	5	0	28	1	203	2	—
Sevilla	2006–07	La Liga	13	0	5	0	—		8	0	26	0	
Sevilla	2007–08	La Liga	2	0	1	0	—		3	0	6	0	
Sevilla	Total		15	0	6	0	—		11	0	32	0	—
Celtic	2007–08	Premier League	16	1	3	0	0	0	0	0	19	1	
Celtic	2008–09	Premier League	32	0	2	0	4	0	4	0	42	0	
Celtic	2009–10	Premier League	31	0	3	0	1	0	4	0	39	0	
Celtic	Total		79	1	8	0	5	0	8	0	100	1	—
SC Freiburg	2011–12	Bundesliga	7	0	0	0	—		—		7	0	
SC Freiburg II	2011–12	Regionalliga Südwest	1	0	—		—		—		1	0	
Career total			277	2	28	0	10	0	47	1	362	3	—

=== Managerial record ===
As of matches played on 21 October 2018

Team	From	To	Record					
Team	From	To	M	W	D	L	Win %	Ref.
VfB Stuttgart II	19 December 2016	30 June 2018	49	21	11	17	42.86	
VfB Stuttgart	7 October 2018	9 October 2018	0	0	0	0	—	
Total			49	21	11	17	42.86	—

== Honours ==
VfB Stuttgart

- UEFA Intertoto Cup: 2002

Sevilla

- Copa del Rey: 2006–07
- Supercopa de España: 2007
- UEFA Super Cup: 2006
- UEFA Cup: 2006–07

Celtic

- Scottish Premier League: 2007–08
- Scottish League Cup: 2008–09
