= Jochen Endreß =

German footballer

Personal information
- Date of birth: 3 November 1972 (age 53)
- Height: 1.80 m (5 ft 11 in)
- Position: Defender

Youth career
- –1987: TSV Hirschau
- 1987–1990: VfB Stuttgart

Senior career*
| Years | Team | Apps | (Gls) |
| 1990–2002 | VfB Stuttgart | 78 | (2) |
| 2002–2003 | SSV Reutlingen | 20 | (0) |
| 2003–2004 | TSG 1899 Hoffenheim | 25 | (1) |
| 2004–2006 | TSG 1899 Hoffenheim II | | |
- * Club domestic league appearances and goals

Jochen Endreß (born 3 November 1972) is a retired German football player.

== Honours ==
VfB Stuttgart

- UEFA Intertoto Cup: 2000
