= Timo Hildebrand =

German footballer (born 1979)

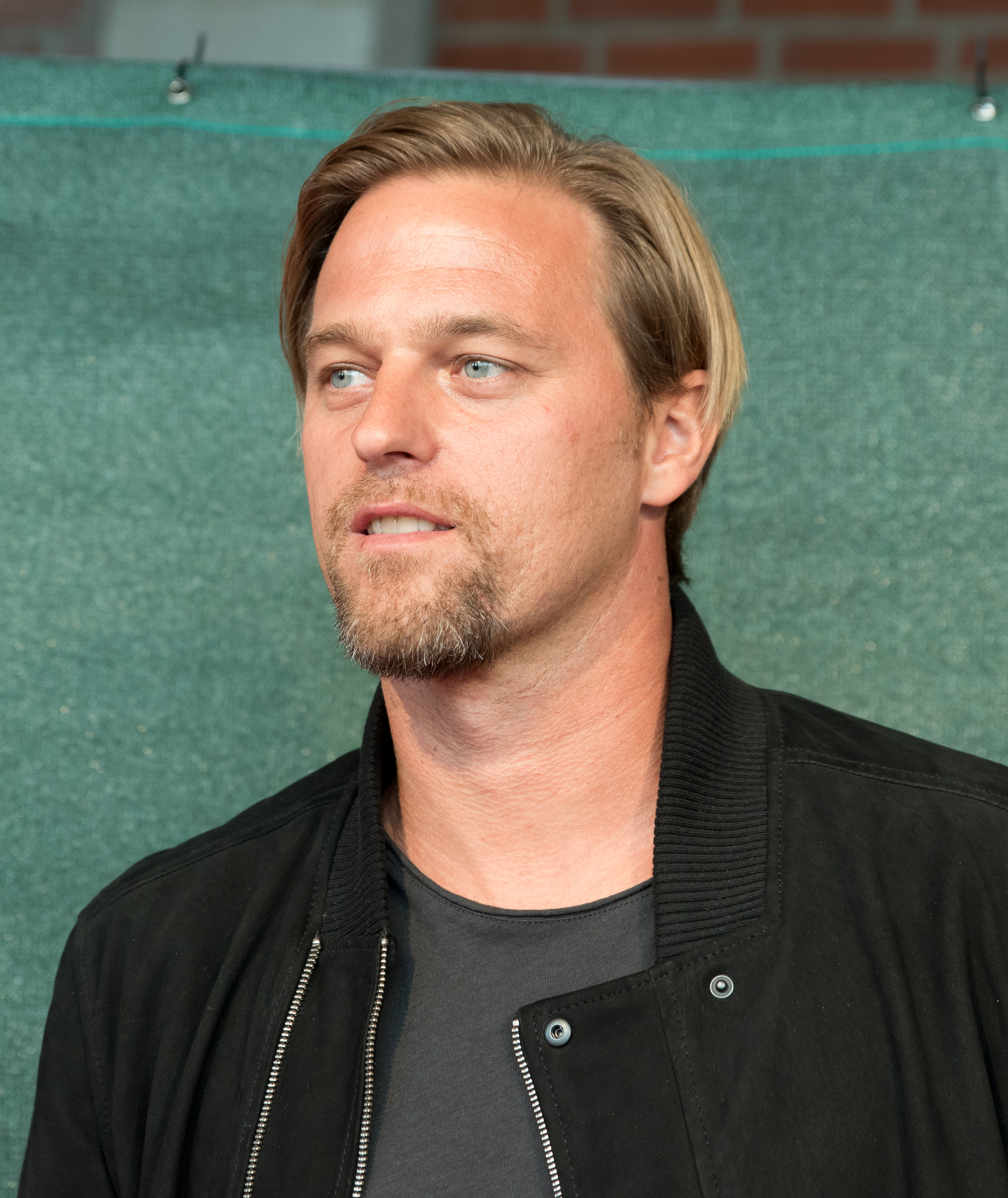
- Hildebrand in 2016

Personal information
- Full name: Timo Hildebrand
- Date of birth: 5 April 1979 (age 47)
- Place of birth: Worms, West Germany
- Height: 1.85 m (6 ft 1 in)
- Position: Goalkeeper

Youth career
- 1984–1994: FV Hofheim/Ried
- 1994–1999: VfB Stuttgart

Senior career*
Years	Team	Apps	(Gls)
1999–2007	VfB Stuttgart	221	(0)
2007–2008	Valencia	26	(0)
2008–2010	1899 Hoffenheim	38	(0)
2010–2011	Sporting CP	0	(0)
2011	Schalke 04 II	6	(0)
2011–2014	Schalke 04	39	(0)
2014–2015	Eintracht Frankfurt	3	(0)
Total		333	(0)

International career
1999–2001	Germany U21	18	(0)
2002–2003	Germany Team 2006	2	(0)
2004–2007	Germany	7	(0)
- * Club domestic league appearances and goals

Timo Hildebrand (born 5 April 1979) is a German former professional footballer who played as a goalkeeper.

Hildebrand holds a Bundesliga record for keeping a clean sheet for the most consecutive minutes (884 minutes), which he set during the 2003–04 season.

== Club career ==
=== VfB Stuttgart ===
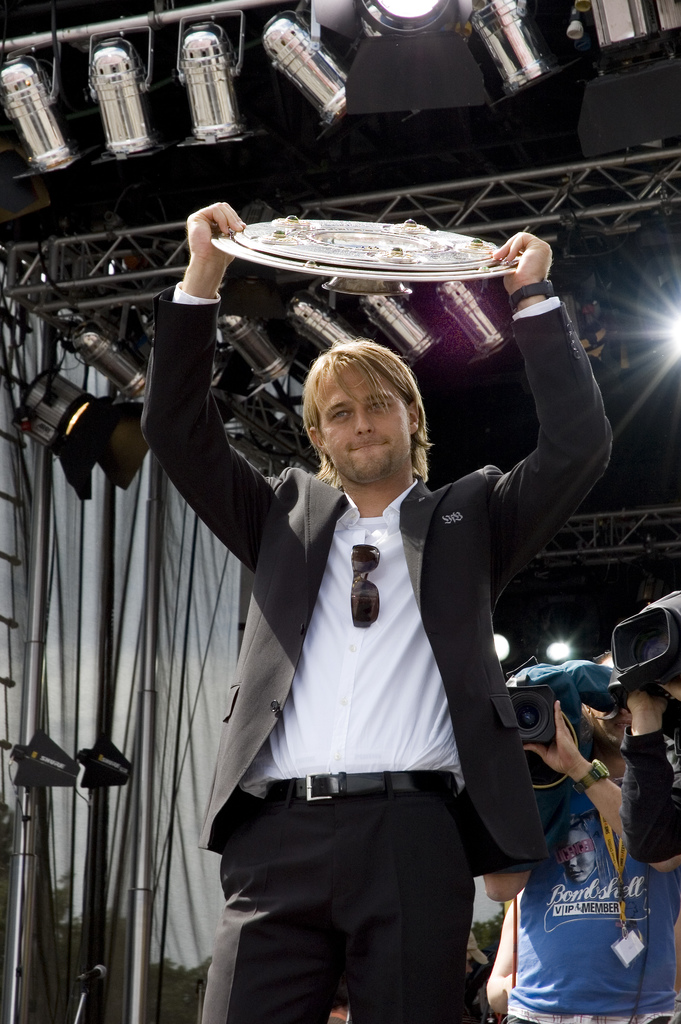
Hildebrand celebrating the win of the Bundesliga with Stuttgart, 2007

After starting his career at the little-known FV Hofheim/Ried, Hildebrand joined the Stuttgart youth team in 1994.

In the 1999–2000 season, Hildebrand played in six Bundesliga matches. From the summer of 2000, he was the club's number one goalkeeper and contributed largely to Stuttgart's successes, particularly as part of what became known as "Stuttgart's young wild ones" team under coach Felix Magath. He began the 2000–01 season by playing in eight matches in the Intertoto Cup. He went on making 32 Bundesliga appearances, five German Cup appearances, and eight UEFA Cup. The following season, he made 34 appearances. VfB Stuttgart managed to be Bundesliga runners-up in 2003. He had made 20 Bundesliga appearances, one German Cup appearance, four UEFA Cup appearances, and eight Intertoto Cup matches. He survived the Champions League group stage the following season, before bowing out to Chelsea FC in the second round. He made 43 appearances during the 2003–04 season.

Hildebrand also played a significant role in Stuttgart's victorious 2006–07 Bundesliga campaign, figuring as a backbone for the next generation of "wild ones" like Serdar Tasci or Mario Gómez and helping Stuttgart provide the third-best defence of the season. The 2006–07 campaign remains his greatest domestic success to this day, and his last season with Stuttgart as in December 2006 he did not accept the club's offer to extend his contract. He made 39 appearances during the 2006–07 season.

=== Valencia ===
Hildebrand joined the Spanish club Valencia on a free transfer on 3 July 2007, with Valencia unveiling Hildebrand via a news conference the next day on 4 July 2007. He stated in the news conference that he would "give everything" to the club. Hildebrand was being viewed as a replacement to the club's long-serving goalkeeper Santiago Cañizares. He made his debut for Valencia on 29 August, for the third qualification round second leg of UEFA Champions League against IF Elfsborg. He played the full 90 minutes of that game of which they won 2–1.

Hildebrand was Valencia's first-choice goalkeeper for most of the 2007–08 season, collecting a Copa del Rey trophy on the way. After the departure of manager Ronald Koeman, Hildebrand lost his place in the first team as Koeman's successor Unai Emery preferred newly signed Renan Brito. According to media coverage, Hildebrand refused consignment to the bench and was eventually cut from the squad altogether. Hildebrand had not been playing for Valencia for several months since the Supercopa de España second leg on 24 August 2008. On 4 December 2008, he left Valencia by mutual consent.

=== Hoffenheim ===
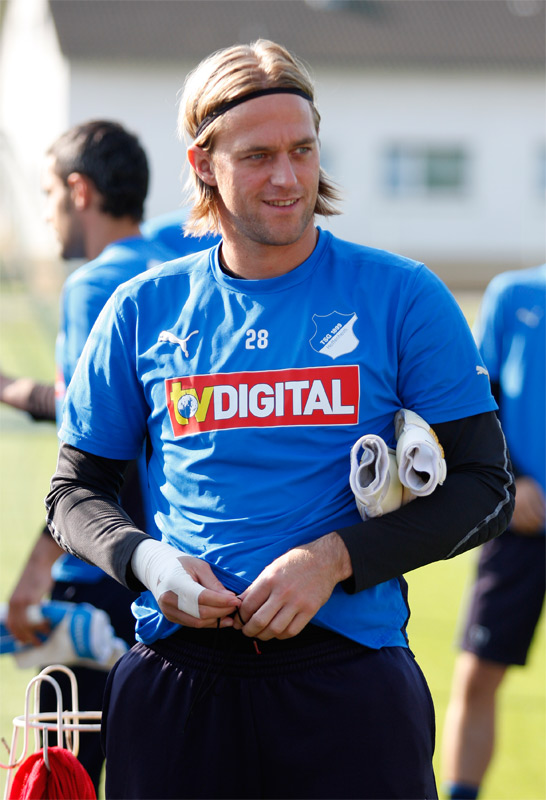
Hildebrand at practice with Hoffenheim in 2009

On 10 December 2008, Hildebrand signed for the Bundesliga side 1899 Hoffenheim. He made his Bundesliga debut for Hoffenheim on 31 January 2009 in their 2–0 win at home to Energie Cottbus, being substituted in the 60th minute due to an injury. During the 2008–09 season, he made 14 appearances. During the 2009–10 season, he made 32 appearances.

In summer 2010, Hildebrand left Hoffenheim.

=== Sporting ===
Hildebrand signed a one-year deal with Portuguese club Sporting CP and debuted on 16 October 2010 in a 2–1 win over GD Estoril Praia in the Portuguese cup.

After Hildebrand left Sporting, he was on trial with Manchester City on their pre-season tour of USA before the 2011–12 season, but they did not take up the option to sign him.

=== Schalke 04 ===
Hildebrand signed for Schalke 04 in the middle of the 2011–12 Bundesliga campaign after starting keeper Ralf Fährmann was injured.

=== Eintracht Frankfurt ===
On 25 September 2014 Hildebrand signed for Eintracht Frankfurt in the wake of a major injury to their first-choice keeper Kevin Trapp. He made three appearances. This final top-flight matches for Eintracht were the last of over 300 Bundesliga appearances for Hildebrand.

== International career ==
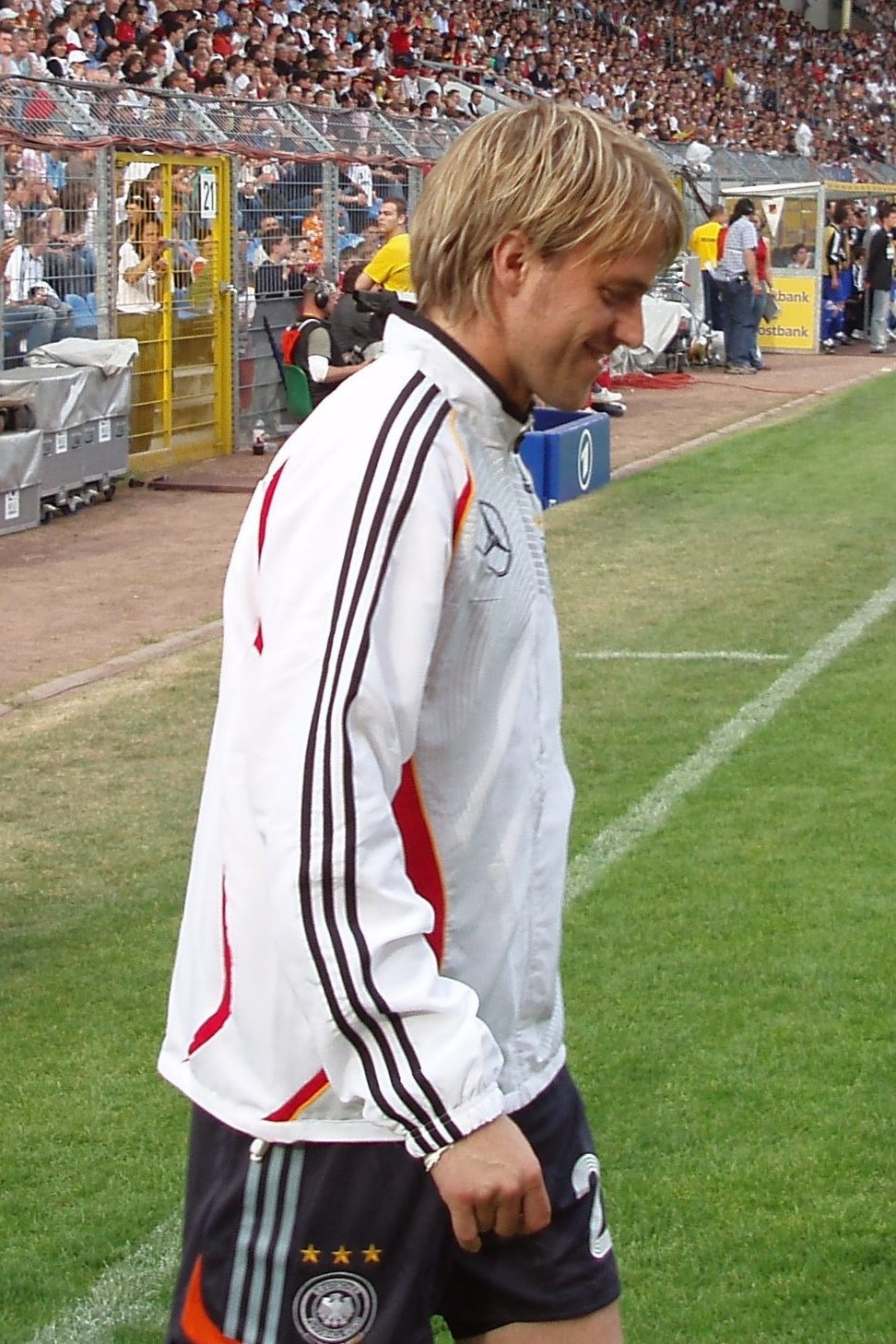
Hildebrand with Germany in 2006

After collecting 18 Under-21-caps, Hildebrand made his full international debut for Germany on 28 April 2004 in a friendly against Romania in Bucharest as he came on as a half-time substitute for Oliver Kahn with Germany 0–4 down, and eventually lost 1–5.

Hildebrand was selected for three consecutive tournaments for Germany, Euro 2004, 2005 Confederations Cup and 2006 World Cup, as Germany's third-choice goalkeeper behind Jens Lehmann and Oliver Kahn. He played his first competitive international at the 2005 Confederations Cup against Argentina (final score 2–2). He was the only member of the 2006 World Cup squad who did not play at the tournament, as Germany came third on home soil.

After Kahn's retirement from international football in 2006, Hildebrand stepped up to become Germany's number two and was Jens Lehmann's natural replacement during the Euro 2008 qualification. Somewhat surprisingly, Joachim Löw dropped Hildebrand from the final squad for the tournament and picked Robert Enke and René Adler ahead of him. Although Löw stated that Hildebrand was an important player and may return to the set-up in near future, he never appeared for Germany since his omission from their squad for Euro 2008.

== Career statistics ==
=== Club ===
Appearances and goals by club, season and competition
Club	Season	League			National cup (Note: Appearances in the German Cup, Spanish Cup, and Portuguese Cup)		League cup (Note: Appearances in the DFL-Ligapokal, Taça da Liga)		Europe		Other		Total		Ref.
Club	Season	Division	Apps	Goals	Apps	Goals	Apps	Goals	Apps	Goals	Apps	Goals	Apps	Goals	Ref.
VfB Stuttgart	1999–2000	Bundesliga	6	0	0	0	—		—		—		6	0	
VfB Stuttgart	2000–01	Bundesliga	32	0	5	0	—		16 (Note: Appearances in the UEFA Intertoto Cup and UEFA Cup)	0	—		53	0	
VfB Stuttgart	2001–02	Bundesliga	31	0	3	0	—		—		—		34	0	
VfB Stuttgart	2002–03	Bundesliga	20	0	1	0	—		12	0	—		33	0	
VfB Stuttgart	2003–04	Bundesliga	34	0	0	0	1	0	8 (Note: Appearances in the UEFA Champions League)	0	—		43	0	
VfB Stuttgart	2004–05	Bundesliga	34	0	3	0	2	0	7 (Note: Appearances in the UEFA Cup/Europa League)	0	—		46	0	
VfB Stuttgart	2005–06	Bundesliga	31	0	2	0	3	0	6	0	—		42	0	
VfB Stuttgart	2006–07	Bundesliga	33	0	6	0	—		—		—		39	0	
VfB Stuttgart	Total		221	0	20	0	6	0	49	0	—		296	0	—
Valencia	2007–08	La Liga	26	0	8	0	—		3	0	—		37	0	
Valencia	2008–09	La Liga	0	0	0	0	—		0	0	2 (Note: Appearances in the Supercopa de España)	0	2	0	
Valencia	Total		26	0	8	0	—		3	0	2	0	39	0	—
1899 Hoffenheim	2008–09	Bundesliga	10	0	4	0	—		—		—		14	0	
1899 Hoffenheim	2009–10	Bundesliga	28	0	4	0	—		—		—		32	0	
1899 Hoffenheim	Total		38	0	8	0	—		—		—		46	0	—
Sporting CP	2010–11	Primeira Liga	0	0	1	0	0	0	2	0	—		3	0	
Schalke 04	2011–12	Bundesliga	6	0	0	0	—		5	0	—		11	0	
Schalke 04	2012–13	Bundesliga	21	0	3	0	—		3	0	—		27	0	
Schalke 04	2013–14	Bundesliga	12	0	2	0	—		6	0	—		20	0	
Schalke 04	Total		39	0	5	0	—		14	0	—		58	0	—
Schalke 04 II	2011–12	Regionalliga West	5	0	—		—		—		—		5	0	
Schalke 04 II	2012–13	Regionalliga West	1	0	—		—		—		—		1	0	
Schalke 04 II	Total		6	0	—		—		—		—		6	0	—
Eintracht Frankfurt	2014–15	Bundesliga	3	0	0	0	—		—		—		3	0	
Career total			333	0	42	0	6	0	68	0	2	0	451	0	—

=== International ===
Appearances and goals by national team and year
National team	Year	Apps	Goals
Germany	2004	2	0
Germany	2005	1	0
Germany	2006	2	0
Germany	2007	2	0
Total		7	0

== Honours ==
VfB Stuttgart

- UEFA Intertoto Cup: 2000, 2002
- Bundesliga: 2006–07
- DFB-Pokal runner-up: 2006–07

Valencia

- Copa del Rey: 2007–08

Germany

- FIFA World Cup third place: 2006
- FIFA Confederations Cup third place: 2005

Individual

- ESM Team of the Year: 2003–04
