= Steffen Kocholl =

German footballer

Personal information
- Date of birth: 10 May 1983 (age 43)
- Place of birth: Öhringen, West Germany
- Height: 1.75 m (5 ft 9 in)
- Position: Defender

Youth career
- TSG Öhringen
- TSV Pfedelbach
- VfB Stuttgart

Senior career*
Years	Team	Apps	(Gls)
2001–2005	VfB Stuttgart II	36	(1)
2001–2002	VfB Stuttgart	1	(0)
2005–2006	SC Preußen Münster	24	(0)
2006–2008	SSV Reutlingen	29	(0)
2008	SSV Reutlingen	11	(0)
2009–2010	TSV Crailsheim	26	(1)
2010–2013	TURA Untermünkheim		
- * Club domestic league appearances and goals

Steffen Kocholl (born 10 May 1983 in Öhringen) is a German former footballer.
