= Adhemar (footballer, born 1972) =

Brazilian footballer

Personal information
- Full name: Adhemar Ferreira de Camargo Neto
- Date of birth: 27 April 1972 (age 54)
- Place of birth: Tatuí, São Paulo, Brazil
- Height: 1.69 m (5 ft 7 in)
- Position: Forward

Senior career*
Years	Team	Apps	(Gls)
1991–1993	Estrela de Porto Feliz		
1994	São José		
1995–1996	São Bento		
1996	Corinthians		
1997	São Caetano		
1998	Ponta Grossa		
1999–2001	São Caetano		
2001–2003	VfB Stuttgart	39	(9)
2003–2004	São Caetano	58	(16)
2004	Seongnam Ilhwa Chunma	9	(0)
2004	São Caetano		
2005	Yokohama F. Marinos	0	(0)
2005–2006	São Caetano		
2012	Serrano		
- * Club domestic league appearances and goals as of 2 March 2012

Adhemar Ferreira de Camargo Neto (born 27 April 1972), or simply Adhemar, is a former Brazilian football forward. Nicknamed O Canhão do ABC (Cannon of the ABC), his shot power and free kick ability drew him a cult following.

== Career ==
Adhemar scored 22 goals in the Copa João Havelange for São Caetano, helping them reach the final against Vasco da Gama. However, since São Caetano played in Group Yellow (equivalent to the second tier) before the round of 16, his goals there did not count towards the overall ranking.

In January 2001, Adhemar joined VfB Stuttgart, scoring a hat-trick on his league debut against 1. FC Kaiserslautern. He spent a season and a half with the club, making a total of 39 appearances and scoring nine goals in the Bundesliga.

Adhemar's powerful shots were noticed by American football team Tampa Bay Buccaneers, who invited him for a trial, where he scored nine out of ten 50-yard field goals. The Bucs offered Adhemar a multi-million-dollar contract, but he refused due to issues regarding a work permit.

On 2 March 2012, Adhemar came out of retirement to play in the Campeonato Carioca third division for Serrano.
