= Robert Vujević =

Croatian footballer

Personal information
- Date of birth: 26 November 1980 (age 45)
- Place of birth: Esslingen am Neckar, West Germany
- Height: 1.78 m (5 ft 10 in)
- Position: Midfielder

Youth career
- TSG Esslingen
- 1998–1999: VfB Stuttgart

Senior career*
Years	Team	Apps	(Gls)
1999–2004	VfB Stuttgart II	109	(14)
2001–2003	VfB Stuttgart	1	(0)
2004–2007	Sportfreunde Siegen	47	(0)
2007–2008	SSV Reutlingen	29	(1)
2009	Würzburger Kickers	11	(0)
Total		197	(15)
- * Club domestic league appearances and goals

Robert Vujević (born 26 November 1980 in Esslingen am Neckar, Germany) is a Croatian former professional footballer. He spent two seasons in the Bundesliga with VfB Stuttgart.
