= Silvio Meißner =

German footballer

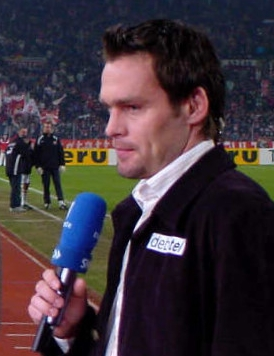
- Silvio Meißner

Personal information
- Date of birth: 19 January 1973 (age 53)
- Place of birth: Halle, East Germany
- Height: 1.76 m (5 ft 9 in)
- Position: Midfielder

Senior career*
Years	Team	Apps	(Gls)
1993–1996	Chemnitzer FC	89	(21)
1996–2000	Arminia Bielefeld	114	(13)
2000–2008	VfB Stuttgart	183	(27)
2004–2005	VfB Stuttgart II	1	(0)
2006–2007	VfB Stuttgart II	1	(0)
2006–2007	→ 1. FC Kaiserslautern (loan)	15	(5)
Total		300	(66)

International career
1999	Germany B	3	(0)
- * Club domestic league appearances and goals

Silvio Meißner (born 19 January 1973) is a German former professional football midfielder who played as a midfielder, notably for VfB Stuttgart in the Bundesliga. He was born in Halle, East Germany, and during his early career, he was often played as a striker (for Chemnitzer FC) or as a defender (for Arminia Bielefeld).

== Honours ==
VfB Stuttgart

- UEFA Intertoto Cup: 2000
- Bundesliga runner-up: 2002–03
- DFB-Ligapokal finalist: 2005
