= Michael Rundio =

German footballer

Personal information
- Full name: Michael Immanuel Rundio
- Date of birth: 21 January 1983 (age 43)
- Place of birth: Ulm, West Germany
- Height: 1.88 m (6 ft 2 in)
- Position: Defender

Team information
- Current team: SV Lonsee

Youth career
- SV Lonsee
- –1996: SC Geislingen
- 1996–2001: VfB Stuttgart

Senior career*
Years	Team	Apps	(Gls)
2001–2003	VfB Stuttgart II	31	(1)
2001–2003	VfB Stuttgart	4	(0)
2004	SpVgg Greuther Fürth	5	(0)
2005	→ Sportfreunde Siegen (loan)	0	(0)
2005	SpVgg Greuther Fürth	0	(0)
2006–2008	TSG 1899 Hoffenheim	0	(0)
2009–	SV Lonsee	0	(0)
- * Club domestic league appearances and goals

Michael Immanuel Rundio (born 21 January 1983 in Ulm) is a German former footballer who played for SV Lonsee. He spent three seasons in the Bundesliga with VfB Stuttgart and also played two games for the club in the UEFA Cup.
