= Zvonimir Soldo =

Croatian footballer and manager (born 1967)

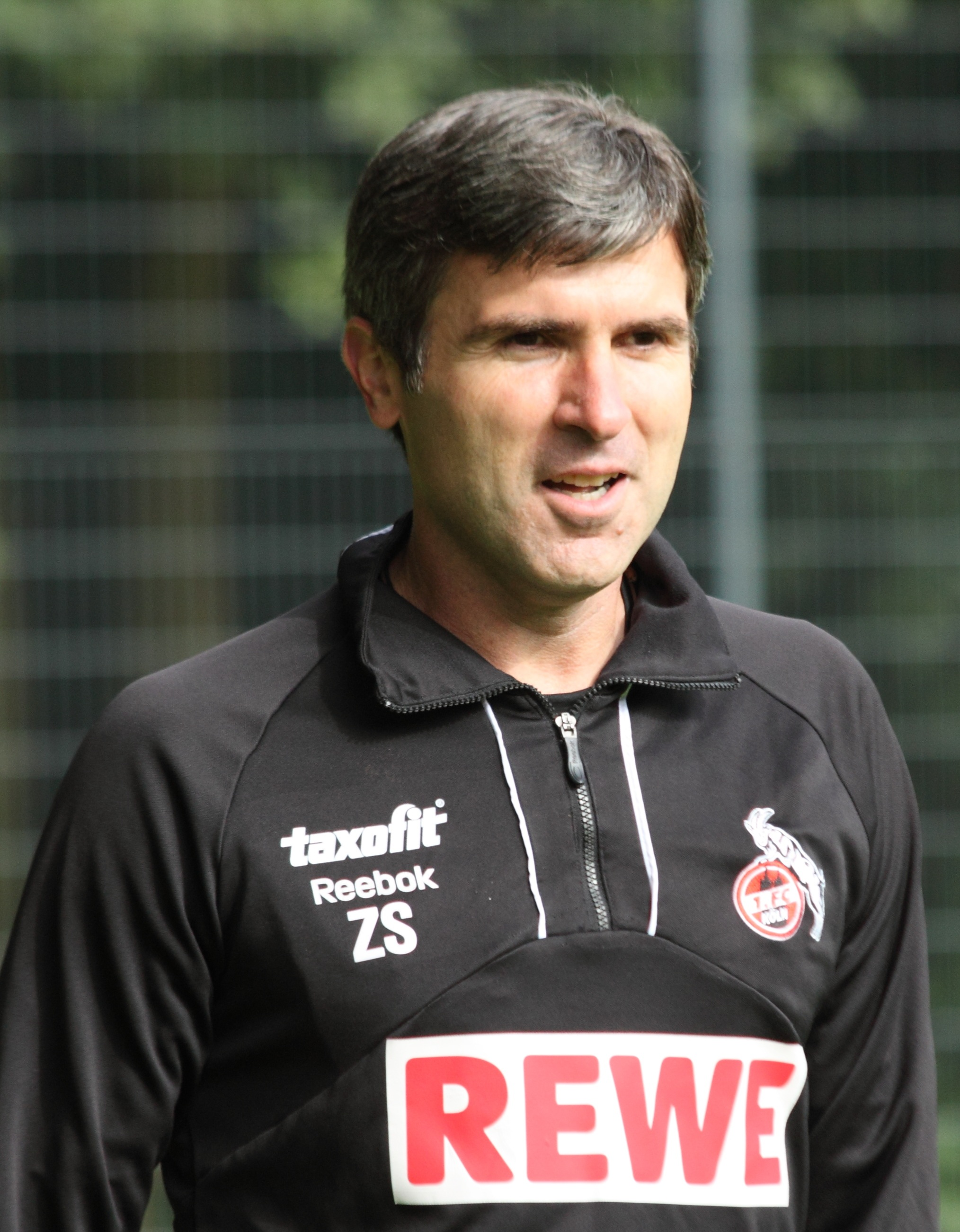
- Soldo as manager of 1. FC Köln

Personal information
- Date of birth: 2 November 1967 (age 58)
- Place of birth: Zagreb, SR Croatia, Yugoslavia
- Height: 1.89 m (6 ft 2 in)
- Positions: Centre back; defensive midfielder

Senior career*
Years	Team	Apps	(Gls)
1988–1990	Dinamo Zagreb	36	(0)
1990–1991	NK Zadar	26	(2)
1991–1994	Inter Zaprešić	55	(2)
1994–1996	Croatia Zagreb	51	(3)
1996–2006	VfB Stuttgart	301	(15)
Total		469	(22)

International career
1994–2002	Croatia	61	(3)

Managerial career
- 2008: Dinamo Zagreb
- 2009–2010: 1. FC Köln
- 2017: Shandong Luneng (assistant)
- 2020: Admira Wacker
- 2021–2022: Tractor
- * Club domestic league appearances and goals

Zvonimir Soldo (born 2 November 1967) is a Croatian football manager and former player. During his playing career, he mostly played as defensive midfielder.

== Club career ==
=== Early career ===
After studying law for six semesters at the University of Zagreb, Soldo's parents convinced him to pursue a career as professional football player.

Soldo's professional career began with NK Dinamo Zagreb which he left for NK Zadar after two years. 1991 through 1994, he played for NK Inter Zaprešić before returning to his former club, now named NK Croatia Zagreb.

Runner-up in both Croatian league and cup in his first season back at Zagreb, the next campaign saw Soldo's side complete a domestic double in 1995/96. After achieving all he could in domestic football, Soldo headed for German side VfB Stuttgart.

=== VfB Stuttgart ===
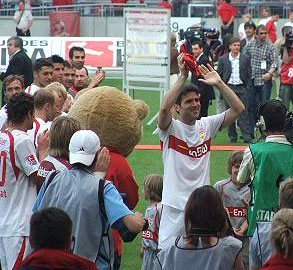
Zvonimir Soldo at his Bundesliga farewell match

Soldo made his Bundesliga debut on 17 August 1996 against FC Schalke 04. This was the beginning of his time in Stuttgart which would last for ten years and during which he would lead VfB Stuttgart on the pitch as captain nearly 200 times.

During this period, Soldo played another 300 times in the Bundesliga and 47 times in European competitions, won the German cup in 1997 and reached the European Cup Winners' Cup final in 1998, as well as finishing as runner-up in the 2002–03 campaign.

Soldo played his last Bundesliga match for Stuttgart on 6 May 2006.

In recognition of his merits, Soldo received the Staufer medal, a decoration awarded by the state of Baden-Württemberg.

== International career ==
Soldo was also a long-time member of the national team and made his debut for Croatia in an April 1994 friendly match away against Slovakia, coming on as a 46th-minute substitute for Slavko Ištvanić. He earned a total of 61 caps, scoring 3 goals and was an important member of the squad that finished third in the 1998 World Cup and also made notable appearances at the Euro 96 and 2002 FIFA World Cups. His final international was a June 2002 FIFA World Cup match against Italy and Soldo retired from international football after that tournament.

== Coaching career ==
=== Dinamo Zagreb ===
On 14 January 2008 Zvonimir was appointed as a new manager of Dinamo Zagreb after Branko Ivanković's resignation. Prior to that he was managing Dinamo's youth team. He became Prva HNL Champion and Croatian Cup Winner. He offered his resignation in the night after the cup final to make space to old/new manager Branko Ivanković.

=== 1. FC Köln ===
From June 2009 to October 2010, Soldo was the manager of German Bundesliga club, 1. FC Köln (Cologne) after the club's former coach Christoph Daum surprisingly left to sign for Fenerbahçe.

=== Admira Wacker ===
Soldo replaced Klaus Schmidt as manager of Admira Wacker in February 2020, but on 13 September 2020, he resigned following a 1–4 loss to Rapid Wien.

=== Tractor S.C. ===
On 14 November 2021, he was appointed as coach of Tractor.

== Career statistics ==
Scores and results list Croatia's goal tally first, score column indicates score after each Soldo goal.

List of international goals scored by Zvonimir Soldo
No.	Date	Venue	Opponent	Score	Result	Competition
1	11 October 1997	Bežigrad Stadium, Ljubljana, Slovenia	Slovenia	2–0	3–1	1998 FIFA World Cup qualification
2	21 August 1999	Stadion Maksimir, Zagreb, Croatia	Malta	1–0	2–1	UEFA Euro 2000 qualifying
3	5 September 2001	Stadio Olimpico, Serravalle, San Marino	San Marino	3–0	4–0	2002 FIFA World Cup qualification

== Honours ==
=== Player ===
Inker Zaprešić

- Croatian Cup: 1992

Dinamo Zagreb

- Croatian First League: 1995–96
- Croatian Cup: 1995–96

VfB Stuttgart

- DFB-Pokal: 1996–97
- UEFA Cup Winners' Cup Runner-up: 1997–98
- UEFA Intertoto Cup: 2000
- Bundesliga Runner-up: 2002–03

Croatia

- FIFA World Cup third place: 1998

=== Manager ===
Dinamo Zagreb

- Croatian First League: 2007–08
- Croatian Cup: 2007–08

=== Orders ===
- Order of Danica Hrvatska with face of Franjo Bučar – 1995
- Order of the Croatian Trefoil – 1998
