= Marcelo Bordon =

Brazilian footballer

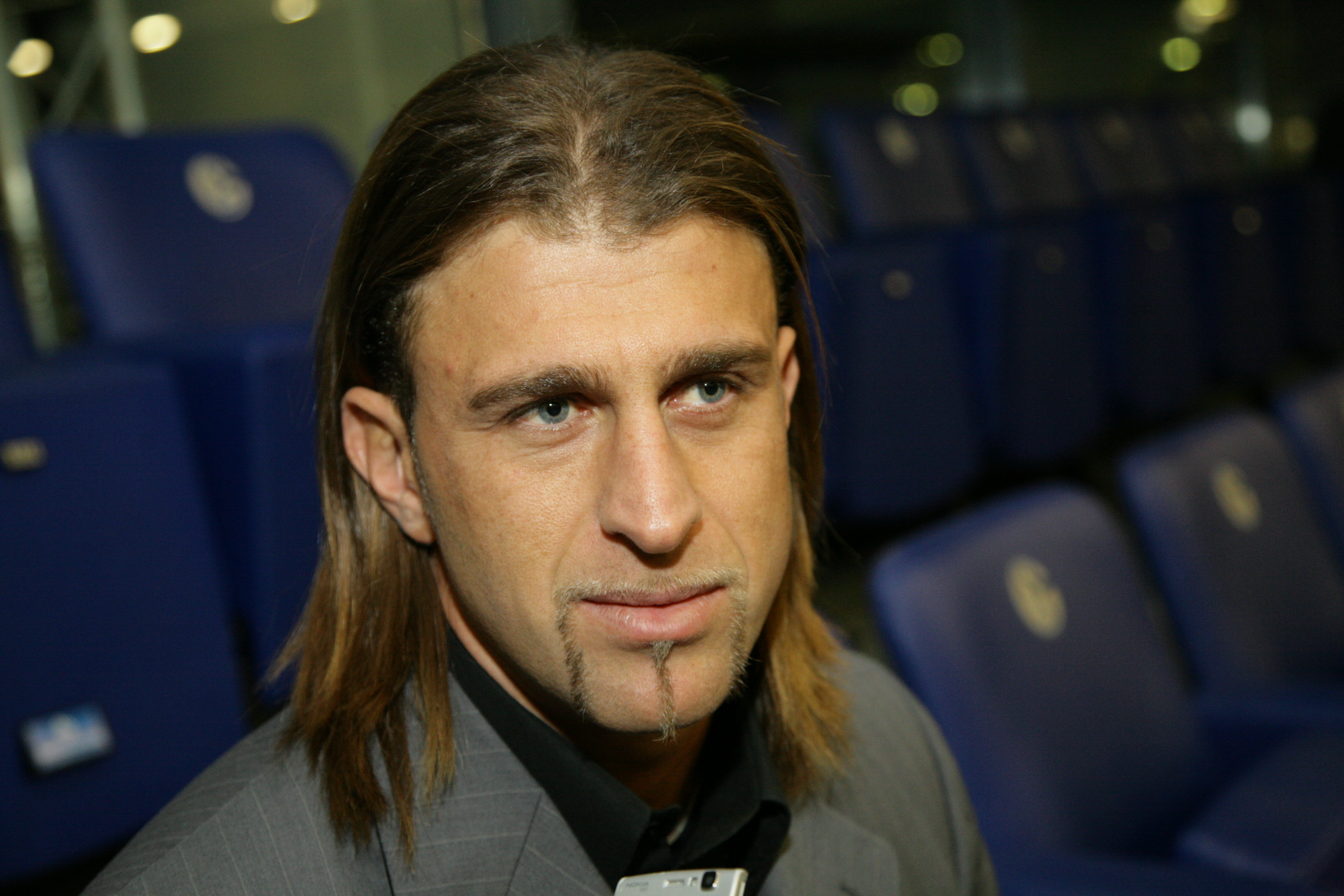
- Bordon in 2008

Personal information
- Full name: Marcelo José Bordon
- Date of birth: 7 January 1976 (age 50)
- Place of birth: Ribeirão Preto, Brazil
- Height: 1.89 m (6 ft 2 in)
- Position: Centre-back

Youth career
- 1983–1993: Botafogo-SP

Senior career*
Years	Team	Apps	(Gls)
1994–1998	São Paulo	73	(2)
1999–2004	VfB Stuttgart	129	(11)
2004–2010	Schalke 04	168	(14)
2010–2011	Al-Rayyan	11	(1)
Total		381	(28)

International career
2004	Brazil	1	(0)

Managerial career
- 2016: Rio Branco-SP
Medal record
Men's football
Representing Brazil
Copa América
Winner	2004 Peru
- * Club domestic league appearances and goals

Marcelo José Bordon (born 7 January 1976) is a former Brazilian professional footballer who played as a centre-back. He is best known for his time with Bundesliga sides VfB Stuttgart and Schalke 04, as well as being part of the 2004 Copa América-winning Brazil squad.

His son, Filipe Bordon, plays in the same position as him for FC Südtirol, on loan from Lazio.

== Career ==
Born in Ribeirão Preto, Bordon spent six years at Schalke between 2004 and July 2010, having been acquired from Stuttgart on a €2.6 million deal. He formed a formidable defensive partnership with Serbian Mladen Krstajić, boasting formidable aerial ability and leadership that earned him the captain's armband from the 2006–07 season until the summer of 2010. On 5 July 2010, Bordon left Schalke and signed for Al-Rayyan in Qatar three days later, earning approximately €6.5 million per year before retiring once his contract expired.

Bordon briefly served as head coach of Rio Branco-SP in 2016.

== Honours ==
São Paulo

- Copa CONMEBOL: 1994

VfB Stuttgart

- UEFA Intertoto Cup: 2000, 2002

Schalke 04

- UEFA Intertoto Cup: 2004
- DFL-Ligapokal: 2005

Brazil

- 2004 Copa América
