= Heiko Gerber =

German former footballer (born 1972)

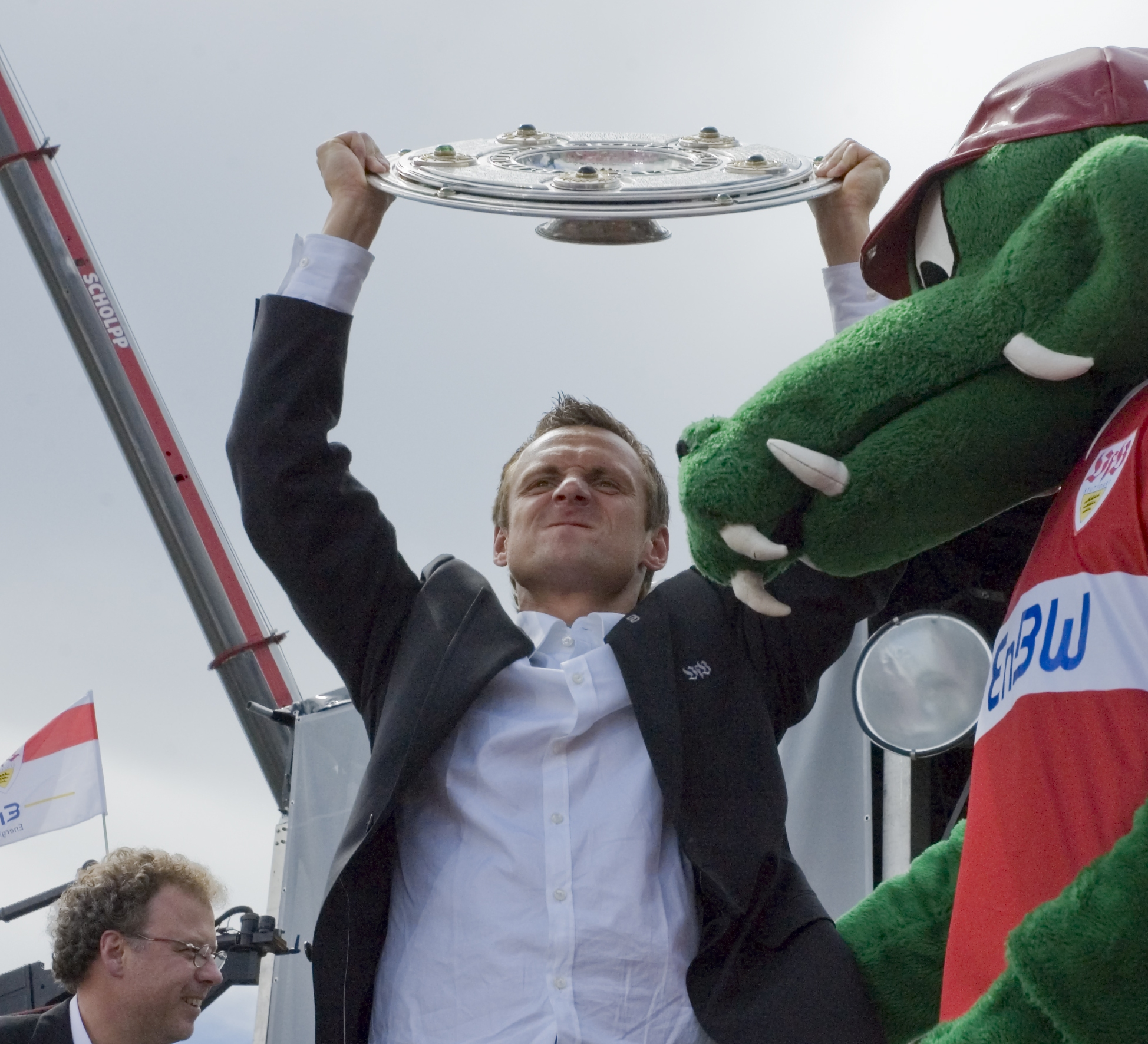
- Gerber in 2007

Personal information
- Date of birth: 11 July 1972 (age 54)
- Place of birth: Stollberg, Saxony, East Germany
- Height: 1.81 m (5 ft 11 1/2 in)
- Position: Left-back

Youth career
- 1978–1981: BSG Aktivist Neu-Oelsnitz
- 1981–1986: BSG Stahl Lugau
- 1986–1991: Chemnitzer FC

Senior career*
Years	Team	Apps	(Gls)
1991–1996	Chemnitzer FC	119	(9)
1996–1998	Arminia Bielefeld	43	(2)
1998–1999	1. FC Nürnberg	24	(2)
1999–2007	VfB Stuttgart	132	(7)
2007–2009	FC Ingolstadt 04	50	(1)
2009–2010	SSV Ulm	31	(1)
Total		399	(22)

International career
1999	Germany	2	(0)

Managerial career
- 2022–: VfB Stuttgart women
- * Club domestic league appearances and goals

Heiko Gerber (born 11 July 1972) is a German former footballer who mainly played as a defender.

== Club career ==
He played more than 330 matches in the German top-flight and the second division.

== International career ==
Gerber represented Germany at the 1999 FIFA Confederations Cup.

== Managerial career ==
Gerber completed his football teaching program at the Hennes-Weisweiler Academy in Hennef, obtaining his UEFA Pro license on March 20, 2017. He served various coaching roles within VfB Stuttgart's youth sector, and from 2020 to 2023, he worked as the assistant coach for the club's U21 team. In July 2022, he became the head coach of VfB Stuttgart women.

== Honours ==
VfB Stuttgart

- UEFA Intertoto Cup: 2000
- Bundesliga champion: 2006–07
- Bundesliga runner-up: 2002–03
- DFB-Pokal finalist: 2006–07
- DFB-Ligapokal finalist: 2005
