= Fernando Meira =

Portuguese former footballer (born 1978)

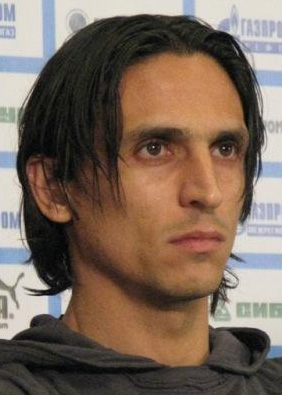
- Meira in 2009

Personal information
- Full name: Fernando José da Silva Freitas Meira
- Date of birth: 5 June 1978 (age 48)
- Place of birth: Guimarães, Portugal
- Height: 1.92 m (6 ft 4 in)
- Positions: Centre-back; defensive midfielder

Youth career
- 1988–1992: Vitória Guimarães
- 1992–1993: Ribeira de Pena
- 1993–1996: Vitória Guimarães

Senior career*
Years	Team	Apps	(Gls)
1996–2000	Vitória Guimarães	53	(2)
1998–1999	→ Felgueiras (loan)	33	(0)
2000–2001	Benfica	46	(2)
2002–2008	VfB Stuttgart	173	(11)
2008–2009	Galatasaray	21	(0)
2009–2011	Zenit St. Petersburg	35	(1)
2011–2012	Zaragoza	12	(0)
Total		373	(16)

International career
1997–1998	Portugal U20	14	(0)
1998–2000	Portugal U21	20	(0)
2004	Portugal Olympic (O.P.)	3	(1)
2000–2008	Portugal	54	(2)
- * Club domestic league appearances and goals

Fernando José da Silva Freitas Meira (Portuguese pronunciation: [fɨɾˈnɐ̃du ˈmɐjɾɐ]; born 5 June 1978) is a Portuguese former professional footballer who played mainly as a central defender.

In his country, he represented most notably Vitória de Guimarães, also playing one year with Benfica. After a lengthy spell in Germany with VfB Stuttgart, he went on to appear for teams in Turkey, Russia and Spain.

Meira played 54 times for the Portugal national team, being part of the squads at the 2006 World Cup and Euro 2008.

== Club career ==
=== Early career and Benfica ===
Born in Guimarães, Meira began his professional career with hometown's Vitória Sport Clube, but only had one solid season with its first team, in 1999–2000 (precisely his last), as he appeared in 30 of his 53 games with the Minho side. In 1998 he was also loaned, to F.C. Felgueiras of the Segunda Liga, being an essential defensive unit as they narrowly missed out on promotion after finishing fifth.

In the summer of 2000, Meira joined Primeira Liga giants S.L. Benfica for a €4 million transfer fee plus one player. He played 31 matches in his first season – 30 starts – and was also awarded team captaincy, but the Lisbon club did not win any silverware during his stint.

=== VfB Stuttgart ===
In January 2002, Meira signed for VfB Stuttgart in Germany for €7.5 million; it was the Bundesliga club's record transfer fee until July 2007, when they signed Ciprian Marica from FC Shakhtar Donetsk for €8 million, and general manager Rolf Rüssmann described the player as a "trophy" signing, showing great ambitions for the future. He made his league debut on the 26th in a 3–0 home win against Hamburger SV, playing the entire game as a stopper.

Meira scored his first goal for Stuttgart on 23 February 2002, in a 1–1 draw at FC Hansa Rostock where he also conceded a penalty which resulted in the opponents' goal. His second came on 7 April in a 2–0 away victory over SC Freiburg, and he finished his first year with 14 league appearances to help his side finish in eighth position.

In the 2002–03 campaign, Felix Magath fielded Meira in 31 league games, only a suspension preventing him from taking part in all the fixtures as they finished second behind FC Bayern Munich to achieve qualification for the UEFA Champions League. He missed two UEFA Cup matches, including the home win against Celtic in the round of 16 second leg, and found the net in the second round's 2–0 home defeat of Ferencvárosi TC.

For 2006–07, Meira was named captain by manager Armin Veh, making him the first Portuguese ever to achieve that feat in the Bundesliga. He appeared in 20 games and added three goals as the Baden-Württemberg club was crowned national champions for the first in 15 years, adding four in a runner-up run in the DFB-Pokal.

Over a six-and-a-half-year spell, Meira made 230 competitive appearances and scored 13 goals. He left the Gottlieb-Daimler-Stadion in summer 2008, aged 30.

=== Galatasaray ===
On 20 July 2008, at the end of the 2007–08 season, Stuttgart stripped Meira of the captaincy and announced their intention to sell the player. Two days later, he agreed to a four-year deal at Galatasaray SK for €4.5 million.

Meira made his official team debut in the Turkish Super Cup, a 2–1 win against Kayserispor, but left Turkey at the end of the campaign, with his team only ranking fifth in the Süper Lig.

=== Zenit ===
In mid-March 2009, after reported interest from FC Zenit Saint Petersburg as the player grew unsettled in Istanbul, Meira signed for the Russian club for €4.5 million, being awarded the number 3 shirt previously worn by Martin Škrtel.

He made his Russian Premier League debut on 15 March 2009, starting in a 1–1 away draw with FC Spartak Moscow. On 5 April he scored his first goal for his new team, in a 3–0 victory at FC Tom Tomsk.

=== Later years ===
On 15 August 2011, aged 33, Meira joined Real Zaragoza from Spain after mutually terminating his contract with Zenit. He made his official debut 13 days later, starting and being booked in a 6–0 home loss against Real Madrid.

In his spell with the Aragonese, Meira featured almost exclusively as a defensive midfielder, partnering Leonardo Ponzio. He terminated his contract on 1 February 2012, as the side were placed last in the league; later that year, not being able to find a new club, he retired from football.

== International career ==
After having earned 20 caps for the under-21s, Meira made his full debut for Portugal on 11 October 2000 in a 2002 FIFA World Cup qualifier against the Netherlands. In 2004 he played three games at the Summer Olympic Games, a group-stage exit.

Meira was selected for the 2006 World Cup in Germany. Benefitting from injury to Jorge Andrade, he appeared in all of Portugal's seven matches in the tournament as the national team finished fourth.

Meira was also a regular fixture at UEFA Euro 2008 held in Austria and Switzerland, taking part in the first three matches but missing the quarter-final clash with Germany, a 3–2 defeat.

== Career statistics ==
=== Club ===
Appearances and goals by club, season and competition
Club	Season	League			National cup (Note: Includes Taça de Portugal, DFB-Pokal, Turkish Cup, Russian Cup, Copa del Rey)		League cup (Note: Includes Taça da Liga, Russian Premier League Cup)		Continental		Total	
Club	Season	Division	Apps	Goals	Apps	Goals	Apps	Goals	Apps	Goals	Apps	Goals
Vitória Guimarães	1999–2000	Primeira Liga	30	2	4	0	—		—		34	2
Benfica	2000–01	Primeira Liga	31	0	3	0	—		2	0	36	0
Benfica	2001–02	Primeira Liga	15	2	2	0	—		—		17	2
Benfica	Total		46	2	5	0	—		2	0	53	2
VfB Stuttgart	2001–02	Bundesliga	14	2	0	0	—		—		14	2
VfB Stuttgart	2002–03	Bundesliga	31	1	2	0	—		6	1	39	2
VfB Stuttgart	2003–04	Bundesliga	32	1	3	0	—		8	0	43	1
VfB Stuttgart	2004–05	Bundesliga	16	1	1	0	—		3	1	20	2
VfB Stuttgart	2005–06	Bundesliga	32	0	2	0	—		6	0	40	0
VfB Stuttgart	2006–07	Bundesliga	20	3	4	0	—		—		24	3
VfB Stuttgart	2007–08	Bundesliga	28	3	3	0	—		6	0	37	3
VfB Stuttgart	Total		173	11	15	0	—		29	2	217	13
Galatasaray	2008–09	Süper Lig	21	0	6	0	—		10	0	37	0
Zenit	2009	Russian Premier League	22	1	2	0	—		2	0	26	1
Zenit	2010	Russian Premier League	11	0	3	0	—		5	0	19	0
Zenit	2011–12	Russian Premier League	1	0	3	0	—		4	0	8	0
Zenit	Total		34	1	8	0	—		11	0	53	1
Zaragoza	2011–12	La Liga	12	0	0	0	—		0	0	12	0
Career total			305	16	38	0	—		50	2	403	18

=== International ===
Appearances and goals by national team and year
National team	Year	Apps	Goals
Portugal	2000	2	0
Portugal	2001	5	0
Portugal	2002	4	0
Portugal	2003	7	0
Portugal	2004	1	0
Portugal	2005	7	2
Portugal	2006	10	0
Portugal	2007	8	0
Portugal	2008	10	0
Total		54	2

Scores and results list Portugal's goal tally first, score column indicates score after each Meira goal.

List of international goals scored by Fernando Meira
No.	Date	Venue	Opponent	Score	Result	Competition
1	4 June 2005	Estádio da Luz, Lisbon, Portugal	Slovakia	1–0	2–0	2006 World Cup qualification
2	17 August 2005	Estádio de São Miguel (Ponta Delgada), Ponta Delgada, Portugal	Egypt	1–0	2–0	Friendly

== Honours ==
VfB Stuttgart

- Bundesliga: 2006–07
- UEFA Intertoto Cup: 2002
- DFB-Pokal runner-up: 2006–07
- DFB-Ligapokal runner-up: 2005

Galatasaray

- Turkish Super Cup: 2008

Zenit

- Russian Premier League: 2010
- Russian Cup: 2009–10
- Russian Super Cup: 2011

Orders

- Medal of Merit, Order of the Immaculate Conception of Vila Viçosa (House of Braganza)
