= Germany national football B team =

National association football team

Germany B
- Association: German Football Association (Deutscher Fußball-Bund — DFB)
- Confederation: UEFA (Europe)
- Most caps: Ronnie Worm (12)
- Top scorer: Manfred Burgsmüller (8)
- FIFA code: GER
First colours	Second colours

The Germany national football B team (or Germany A2) is a secondary team of the Germany national football team, used to try out and develop players for potential inclusion in the first team. The team, which has not been active since 2006, can play against other nations' B-teams, or against full national teams, but its matches are not considered full internationals.

The team was known as Team 2006, as it was the development team for the 2006 FIFA World Cup, which was hosted in Germany.

== Team 2006 ==
In 2000, Germany won the contest to host the 2006 World Cup. After the team was knocked out in the first round of Euro 2000, the German Football Association decided to form Team 2006, a development team for young players, with the hope of producing a squad that could succeed at the 2006 tournament. The team played ten fixtures between 2002 and 2005, with four wins, four draws and two defeats.

Ultimately, only four players from Team 2006 were part of the World Cup Squad – Tim Borowski, Arne Friedrich, Mike Hanke and Timo Hildebrand. However, Manuel Friedrich, Alexander Madlung, Clemens Fritz, Stefan Kießling, Simon Rolfes, Robert Enke, Patrick Helmes, Mario Gómez and Roman Weidenfeller went on to play full internationals, as did Daniel Bierofka, Marco Engelhardt, Fabian Ernst, Frank Fahrenhorst, Ingo Hertzsch, Tobias Rau, Andreas Hinkel and Kevin Kurányi, who had already been capped before their Team 2006 debuts.

The team's coaches were Horst Hrubesch (From 22 March 1999–26 March 2002), Uli Stielike (26 March 2002–2003), and Erich Rutemöller (2003–2005).

== Former players ==
See Category:Germany men's B international footballers
