= 2002–03 1. FC Nürnberg season =

1. FC Nürnberg
2002–03 season
- Head Coach: Klaus Augenthaler (to 30 April 2003); Wolfgang Wolf (from 30 April 2003)
- Stadium: Frankenstadion
- Bundesliga: 17th (relegated)
- DFB-Pokal: Round of 16
- Top goalscorer: League: Saša Ćirić (12); All: Saša Ćirić (16)

The 2002–03 1. FC Nürnberg season happened between 10 August 2002 and 24 May 2003. Nürnberg were relegated after finishing the Bundesliga season in 17th place. Saša Ćirić finished the Bundesliga season tied for 12th place in goals scored with 12 goals.

== Bundesliga ==
=== Bundesliga summary ===
==== August ====
Nürnberg faced VfL Bochum on matchday one on 10 August 2002. Bochum won the match 3–1. Saša Ćirić scored for Nürnberg. Bochum got two goals from Thomas Christiansen and a goal from Vahid Hashemian. Nürnberg finished matchday one in 16th place. Nürnberg faced Hansa Rostock on matchday two on 17 August 2002. Hansa Rostock won the match 2–0 with two goals from René Rydlewicz. Nürnberg finished matchday two in 18th place. Nürnberg faced Hannover 96 on matchday three on 25 August 2002. Nürnberg won 3–1. Nürnberg got two goals from Saša Ćirić and a goal from Cacau. Babacar N'Diaye scored for Hannover. Nürnberg finished matchday three in 11th place.

==== September ====
Nürnberg faced Werder Bremen on matchday four on 10 September 2002. Werder Bremen won the match 4–1. Saša Ćirić scored for Nürnberg. Werder Bremen got three goals from Ailton and a goal from Johan Micoud. Nürnberg finished matchday four in 16th place. Nürnberg faced Bayern Munich on matchday five on 14 September 2002. Saša Ćirić scored for Nürnberg. Michael Ballack scored twice for Bayern Munich. Nürnberg finished matchday five in 17th place. Nürnberg faced VfL Wolfsburg on matchday six on 21 September 2002. Nürnberg won 2–0 with goals from Anthony Sanneh and Dušan Petković. Nürnberg finished matchday six in 13th place. Nürnberg faced 1. FC Kaiserslautern on matchday seven on 29 September 2002. Nürnberg won the match 1–0 with a goal from Anthony Sanneh. Nürnberg finished matchday seven tied for 11th place.

==== October ====
Nürnberg faced Hertha BSC on matchday eight on 5 October 2002. Hertha BSC won the match 2–1. Saša Ćirić scored for Nürnberg. Marcelinho scored two goals for Hertha BSC. Nürnberg finished matchday eight in 13th place. Nürnberg faced VfB Stuttgart on matchday nine on 20 October 2002. Stuttgart won the match 2–1. David Jarolím scored for Nürnberg. Kevin Kurányi and Ioannis Amanatidis scored for Stuttgart. Nürnberg finished matchday nine in 15th place. Nürnberg faced FC Schalke on matchday 10 on 26 October 2002. The match finished in a 1–1 draw. Saša Ćirić scored for Nürnberg and Sven Vermant scored for Schalke. Nürnberg finished matchday 10 in 15th place.

==== November ====
Nürnberg faced Borussia Mönchengladbach on matchday 11 on 2 November 2002. Nürnberg won the match 2–1. Marek Nikl and Saša Ćirić scored for Nürnberg. Jeff Strasser scored for Borussia Mönchengladbach. Stéphane Stassin was semt-off during the match. Nürnberg finished matchday 11 in 12th place. Nürnberg faced Arminia Bielefeld on matchday 12 on 9 November 2002. Nürnberg won the match 1–0 with a goal from Martin Driller. Nürnberg finished matchday 12 in 10th place. Nürnberg faced Hamburger SV on matchday 13 on 16 November 2002. Hamburg won the match 3–1. Saša Ćirić scored for Nürnberg. Sergej Barbarez, Marcel Maltritz, and Bernardo Romeo scored for Hamburg. Nürnberg finished matchday 13 in 12th place. Nürnberg faced 1860 Munich on matchday 14 on 24 November 2002. The match finished in a 2–2 draw. Thomas Stehle scored two goals for Nürnberg and Benjamin Lauth scored two goals for 1860 Munich. Nürnberg finished matchday 24 in 12th place. Nürnberg faced Borussia Dortmund on matchday 15 on 30 November 2002. Borussia Dortmund won the match 2–1. David Jarolím scored for Nürnberg. Lars Ricken and Ewerthon scored for Borussia Dortmund. Nürnberg finished matchday 15 in 14th place.

==== December and January ====
Nürnberg faced Energie Cottbus on matchday 16 on 7 December 2002. The match finished in a 2–2 draw. Marek Nikl and Dušan Petković scored for Nürnberg. Radosław Kałużny and Lars Jungnickel scored for Energie Cottbus. Timo Rost was sent-off during the match. Nürnberg finished matchday 16 in 15th place. Nürnberg faced Bayer Leverkusen on matchday 17 on 14 December 2002. Nürnberg won the match 2–0 with goals from Saša Ćirić and Jésus Júnior. Nürnberg finished matchday 17 in 12th place. Nürnberg faced Bochum on matchday 18 on 25 January 2003. Bochum won the match 2–1. Cacau scored for Nürnberg. Thomas Christiansen and Paul Freier scored for Bochum. Nürnberg finished matchday 18 in 12th place.

==== February ====
Nürnberg faced Hansa Rostock on matchday 19 on 1 February 2003. Hansa Rostock won the match 1–0 with a goal from Rade Prica. Nürnberg finished matchday 19 in 13th place. Nürnberg faced Hannover on matchday 20 on 8 February 2003. Hannover won the match 4–2. Jésus Júnior and Saša Ćirić scored for Nürnberg. Hannover got three goals from Mohammadou Idrissou and a goal from Danijel Štefulj. Saša Ćirić was sent-off in the match. Nürnberg finished matchday 20 in 14th place. Nürnberg faced Werder Bremen on matchday 21 on 15 February 2003. Nürnberg won the match 1–0 with a goal from Lars Müller. Markus Daun was sent-off during the match. Nürnberg finished matchday 21 in 13th place. Nürnberg faced Bayern Munich on matchday 22 on 22 February 2003. Bayern Munich won the match 2–0 with goals from Bixente Lizarazu and Giovane Élber. Nürnberg finished matchday 22 in 13th place.

==== March ====
Nürnberg faced Wolfsburg on matchday 23 on 1 March 2003. The match finished in a 1–1. Lars Müller scored for Nürnberg and Tomislav Marić scored for Wolfsburg. Nürnberg finished matchday 23 in 15th place. Nürnberg faced Kaiserslautern on matchday 24 on 9 March 2003. Kaiserslautern won the match 5–0 with goals from Vratislav Lokvenc, Miroslav Klose, José Dominguez, Christian Timm, and Nenad Bjelica. Nürnberg finished matchday 24 in 17th place. Nürnberg faced Hertha BSC on matchday 25 on 16 March 2003. Hertha BSC won the match 3–0 with goals from Michael Preetz, Thorben Marx, and Marcelinho. Nürnberg finished matchday 25 in 17th place. Nürnberg faced Stuttgart on matchday 26 on 23 March 2003. Nürnberg won the match 2–0 with goals from David Jarolím and Jésus Júnior. Nürnberg finished matchday 26 in 16th place.

==== April ====
Nürnberg faced Schalke on matchday 27 on 5 April 2003. The match finished in a 0–0 draw. Nürnberg finished matchday 27 in 17th place. Nürnberg faced Borussia Mönchengladbach on matchday 28 on 12 April 2003. Borussia Mönchengladbach won 2–0 with goals from Ivo Ulich and Mikael Forssell. Nürnberg finished matchday 28 in 17th place. Nürnberg faced Arminia Bielefeld on matchday 29 on 19 April 2003. The match finished in a 0–0 draw. David Jarolim was sent-off during the match. Nürnberg finished matchday 29 in 17th place. Nürnberg faced Hamburg on matchday 30 on 26 April 2003. Hamburg won the match 4–0 with goals from Milan Fukal, Bernardo Romeo, Mehdi Mahdavikia, and Naohiro Takahara. Nürnberg finished matchday 30 in 17th place.

==== May ====
Nürnberg faced 1860 Munich on 3 May 2003. 1860 Munich won the match 2–1. Martin Driller scored for Nürnberg. Benjamin Lauth scored two goals for 1860 Munich. Rodrigo Costa was sent-off in the match. Nürnberg finished matchday 31 in 17th place. Nürnberg faced Borussia Dortmund on matchday 32 on 10 May 2003. Borussia Dortmund won the match 4–1. Saša Ćirić scored for Nürnberg. Borussia Dortmund got two goals from Lars Ricken, a goal from Giuseppe Reina, and a goal from Jan Koller. Nürnberg finished matchday 32 in 17th place. Nürnberg faced Energie Cottbus on matchday 33 on 17 May 2003. Energie Cottbus won the match 2–1. Jacek Krzynówek scored for Nürnberg. Marko Topić and Andrzej Juskowiak scored for Energie Cottbus. Stephan Paßlack was sent-off during the match. Nürnberg finished matchday 33 in 17th place. Nürnberg faced Bayer Leverkusen on matchday 34 on 24 May 2003. This was the final match of the season. Bayer Leverkusen won the match 1–0 with a goal from Yildiray Bastürk. Nürnberg finished the season in 17th place. Nürnberg were relegated after finishing the Bundesliga season in 17th place. Saša Ćirić was tied for 12th for goals scored in the Bundesliga.

=== Results summary ===
| Overall | | | | | | | | Home | | | | | | Away | | | | | |
| Pld | W | D | L | GF | GA | GD | Pts | W | D | L | GF | GA | GD | W | D | L | GF | GA | GD |
|---|---|---|---|---|---|---|---|---|---|---|---|---|---|---|---|---|---|---|---|
| 34 | 8 | 6 | 20 | 33 | 60 | −27 | 30 | 4 | 4 | 9 | 16 | 24 | −8 | 4 | 2 | 11 | 17 | 36 | −19 |

Last updated: 10 March 2018.
Source: kicker.de

=== Bundesliga results ===
| MD | Date | H/A | Opponent | Res. F–A | Att. | Goalscorers | | Table | | Ref. |
| MD | Date | H/A | Opponent | Res. F–A | Att. | 1. FC Nürnberg | Opponent | Pos. | Pts. | Ref. |
|---|---|---|---|---|---|---|---|---|---|---|
| 1 | 10 Aug | H | Bochum | 1–3 | 31,000 | Ćirić 51' | Christiansen 6', 20'; Hashemian 83' | 16 | 0 | |
| 2 | 17 Aug | A | Hansa Rostock | 0–2 | 19,600 | — | Rydlewicz 37', 83' | 18 | 0 | |
| 3 | 25 Aug | H | Hannover | 3–1 | 25,800 | Ćirić 16' (pen.), 36'; Cacau 49' | N'Diaye 82' (pen.) | 11 | 3 | |
| 4 | 10 Sep | A | Werder Bremen | 1–4 | 25,785 | Ćirić 54' | Ailton 30' (pen.), 63', 78'; Micoud 59' | 16 | 3 | |
| 5 | 14 Sep | H | Bayern Munich | 1–2 | 44,767 | Ćirić 36' (pen.) | Ballack 12', 53' | 17 | 3 | |
| 6 | 21 Sep | A | Wolfsburg | 2–0 | 12,414 | Sanneh 65'; Petković 69' (pen.) | — | 13 | 6 | |
| 7 | 29 Sep | H | Kaiserslautern | 1–0 | 30,200 | Sanneh 69' | — | T11 | 9 | |
| 8 | 5 Oct | A | Hertha BSC | 1–2 | 38,568 | Ćirić 42' | Marcelinho 75', 83' | 13 | 9 | |
| 9 | 20 Oct | H | Stuttgart | 1–2 | 29,500 | Jarolím 44' | Kurányi 80'; Amanatidis 84' | 15 | 9 | |
| 10 | 26 Oct | A | Schalke | 1–1 | 60,601 | Ćirić 12' | Vermant 90' | 15 | 10 | |
| 11 | 2 Nov | H | Borussia Mönchengladbach | 2–1 | 30,600 | Nikl 8'; Ćirić 22' (pen.) | Strasser 75' | 12 | 13 | |
| 12 | 9 Nov | A | Arminia Bielefeld | 1–0 | 18,153 | Driller 56' | — | 10 | 16 | |
| 13 | 16 Nov | H | Hamburg | 1–3 | 26,000 | Ćirić 40' (pen.) | Barbarez 26'; Maltritz 51'; Romeo 66' | 12 | 16 | |
| 14 | 24 Nov | A | 1860 Munich | 2–2 | 32,000 | Stehle 12', 42' | Lauth 39', 71' | 12 | 17 | |
| 15 | 30 Nov | H | Borussia Dortmund | 1–2 | 36,600 | Jarolím 3' | Ricken 54'; Ewerthon 78' | 14 | 17 | |
| 16 | 7 Dec | H | Energie Cottbus | 2–2 | 17,600 | Nikl 41'; Petković 52' (pen.) | Kałużny 15'; Jungnickel 86' | 15 | 18 | |
| 17 | 14 Dec | A | Bayer Leverkusen | 2–0 | 22,500 | Ćirić 58'; Jésus Júnior 88' | — | 12 | 21 | |
| 18 | 25 Jan | A | Bochum | 1–2 | 20,280 | Cacau 24' | Christiansen 27'; Freier 33' | 12 | 21 | |
| 19 | 1 Feb | H | Hansa Rostock | 0–1 | 17,400 | — | Prica 42' | 13 | 21 | |
| 20 | 8 Feb | A | Hannover | 2–4 | 26,157 | Jésus Júnior 32'; Ćirić 52' | Idrissou 9', 21', 24'; Štefulj 71' | 14 | 21 | |
| 21 | 15 Feb | H | Werder Bremen | 1–0 | 17,500 | Müller 41' | — | 13 | 24 | |
| 22 | 22 Feb | A | Bayern Munich | 0–2 | 45,000 | — | Lizarazu 17'; Élber 59' | 13 | 24 | |
| 23 | 1 Mar | H | Wolfsburg | 1–1 | 18,500 | Müller 25' (pen.) | Marić 91' | 15 | 25 | |
| 24 | 9 Mar | A | Kaiserslautern | 0–5 | 35,527 | — | Lokvenc 19'; Klose 25' (pen.); Dominguez 62'; Timm 64'; Bjelica 88' | 17 | 25 | |
| 25 | 16 Mar | H | Hertha BSC | 0–3 | 25,500 | — | Preetz 15'; Marx 39'; Marcelinho 84' | 17 | 25 | |
| 26 | 23 Mar | A | Stuttgart | 2–0 | 35,000 | Jarolím 28'; Jésus Júnior 88' | — | 16 | 28 | |
| 27 | 5 Apr | H | Schalke | 0–0 | 41,100 | — | — | 17 | 29 | |
| 28 | 12 Apr | A | Borussia Mönchengladbach | 0–2 | 30,000 | — | Ulich 12'; Forssell 56' | 17 | 29 | |
| 29 | 19 Apr | H | Arminia Bielefeld | 0–0 | 21,400 | — | — | 17 | 30 | |
| 30 | 26 Apr | A | Hamburg | 0–4 | 43,627 | — | Fukal 36'; Romeo 43'; Mahdavikia 55'; Takahara 76' | 17 | 30 | |
| 31 | 3 May | H | 1860 Munich | 1–2 | 35,558 | Driller 1' | Lauth 56', 73' | 17 | 30 | |
| 32 | 10 May | A | Borussia Dortmund | 1–4 | 67,600 | Ćirić 89' | Ricken 28', 54'; Reina 65'; Koller 68' | 17 | 30 | |
| 33 | 17 May | A | Energie Cottbus | 1–2 | 12,192 | Krzynówek 21' | Topić 13'; Juskowiak 70' | 17 | 30 | |
| 34 | 24 May | H | Bayer Leverkusen | 0–1 | 31,182 | — | Bastürk 36' | 17 | 30 | |

== DFB-Pokal ==
=== DFB-Pokal summary ===
On 31 August 2002, Nürnberg faced Eintracht Trier in the first round. Nürnberg won 2–0 with goals from Milorad Popović and Saša Ćirić. Michael Prus was sent-off during the match. On 6 November 2002, Nürnberg faced Kickers Offenbach in the second round. Nürnberg won 3–2 in extra time. Saša Ćirić scored three goals for Nürnberg. Christian Müller and Michael Petry scored for Kickers Offenbach. On 4 December 2002, Nürnberg faced 1. FC Köln in the round of 16. Köln won the match 2–0 with two goals from Matthias Scherz.

=== DFB-Pokal results ===
| Rd | Date | H/A | Opponent | Res. F–A | Att. | Goalscorers | | Ref. |
| Rd | Date | H/A | Opponent | Res. F–A | Att. | 1. FC Nürnberg | Opponent | Ref. |
|---|---|---|---|---|---|---|---|---|
| 1 | 31 Aug | A | Eintracht Trier | 2–0 | 6,130 | Popović 19'; Ćirić 51' | — | |
| 2 | 6 Nov | A | Kickers Offenbach | 3–2 (aet) | 12,377 | Ćirić 47', 87', 110' | Müller 5'; Petry 12' | |
| R16 | 4 Dec | H | Köln | 0–2 | 16,300 | — | Scherz 47', 78' | |

== Squad statistics ==
=== Matches played and goals scored ===
| No. | Pos | Nat | Player | Total | | Bundesliga | | DFB-Pokal | |
| No. | Pos | Nat | Player | Apps | Goals | Apps | Goals | Apps | Goals |
|---|---|---|---|---|---|---|---|---|---|
| 1 | GK | (Germany) GER | Darius Kampa | 36 | 0 | 34 | 0 | 2 | 0 |
| 12 | GK | (Germany) GER | Raphael Schäfer | 2 | 0 | 1 | 0 | 1 | 0 |
| 2 | DF | (Poland) POL | Tomasz Kos | 29 | 0 | 26 | 0 | 3 | 0 |
| 5 | DF | (Czech Republic) CZE | Marek Nikl | 32 | 2 | 29 | 2 | 3 | 0 |
| 15 | DF | (Germany) GER | Stephan Paßlack | 14 | 0 | 14 | 0 | 0 | 0 |
| 10 | DF | (Serbia and Montenegro) SCG | Dušan Petković | 25 | 2 | 22 | 2 | 3 | 0 |
| 4 | DF | (Serbia and Montenegro) SCG | Milorad Popović | 25 | 1 | 23 | 0 | 2 | 1 |
| 28 | DF | (Germany) GER | Dominik Reinhardt | 1 | 0 | 1 | 0 | 0 | 0 |
| 20 | DF | (United States) USA | Anthony Sanneh | 16 | 2 | 15 | 2 | 1 | 0 |
| 18 | DF | (Germany) GER | Thomas Stehle | 18 | 2 | 17 | 2 | 1 | 0 |
| 24 | DF | (Germany) GER | Andreas Wolf | 14 | 0 | 14 | 0 | 0 | 0 |
| 37 | MF | (Czech Republic) CZE | Pavel David | 4 | 0 | 3 | 0 | 1 | 0 |
| 14 | MF | (Germany) GER | Dieter Frey | 19 | 0 | 17 | 0 | 2 | 0 |
| 6 | MF | (Czech Republic) CZE | David Jarolím | 35 | 3 | 32 | 3 | 3 | 0 |
| 27 | MF | (Brazil) BRA | Jésus Júnior | 20 | 3 | 19 | 3 | 1 | 0 |
| 8 | MF | (Poland) POL | Jacek Krzynówek | 17 | 1 | 17 | 1 | 0 | 0 |
| 21 | MF | (Germany) GER | Michael Kügler | 2 | 0 | 2 | 0 | 0 | 0 |
| 16 | MF | (Norway) NOR | Tommy Svindal Larsen | 33 | 0 | 30 | 0 | 3 | 0 |
| 17 | MF | (Germany) GER | Lars Müller | 36 | 2 | 33 | 2 | 3 | 0 |
| 7 | MF | (Serbia and Montenegro) SCG | Rade Todorović | 9 | 0 | 7 | 0 | 2 | 0 |
| 23 | FW | (Serbia and Montenegro) SCG | Milan Belić | 9 | 0 | 7 | 0 | 2 | 0 |
| 13 | FW | (Germany) GER | Cacau | 29 | 2 | 27 | 2 | 2 | 0 |
| 29 | FW | (North Macedonia) MKD | Saša Ćirić | 30 | 16 | 27 | 12 | 3 | 4 |
| 9 | FW | (Germany) GER | Martin Driller | 19 | 2 | 18 | 2 | 1 | 0 |
| 38 | FW | (Germany) GER | Stefan Kießling | 1 | 0 | 1 | 0 | 0 | 0 |
| 11 | FW | (Germany) GER | Kai Michalke | 15 | 0 | 15 | 0 | 0 | 0 |
| 19 | FW | (Germany) GER | Marco Villa | 6 | 0 | 5 | 0 | 1 | 0 |

=== Bookings ===
| Player | Total | | | Bundesliga | | | DFB-Pokal | | | Ref. |
| Player | Booked | (yellow card) (red card) | Sent off (straight red) | Booked | (yellow card) (red card) | Sent off (straight red) | Booked | (yellow card) (red card) | Sent off (straight red) | Ref. |
|---|---|---|---|---|---|---|---|---|---|---|
| Darius Kampa | 0 | 0 | 0 | 0 | 0 | 0 | 0 | 0 | 0 | |
| Raphael Schäfer | 0 | 0 | 0 | 0 | 0 | 0 | 0 | 0 | 0 | |
| Tomasz Kos | 7 | 0 | 0 | 6 | 0 | 0 | 1 | 0 | 0 | |
| Marek Nikl | 3 | 0 | 0 | 3 | 0 | 0 | 0 | 0 | 0 | |
| Stephan Paßlack | 4 | 0 | 1 | 4 | 0 | 1 | 0 | 0 | 0 | |
| Dušan Petković | 0 | 0 | 0 | 4 | 0 | 0 | 0 | 0 | 0 | |
| Milorad Popović | 5 | 0 | 0 | 3 | 0 | 0 | 2 | 0 | 0 | |
| Dominik Reinhardt | 0 | 0 | 0 | 0 | 0 | 0 | 0 | 0 | 0 | |
| Anthony Sanneh | 2 | 0 | 0 | 2 | 0 | 0 | 0 | 0 | 0 | |
| Thomas Stehle | 8 | 0 | 0 | 8 | 0 | 0 | 0 | 0 | 0 | |
| Andreas Wolf | 3 | 0 | 0 | 3 | 0 | 0 | 0 | 0 | 0 | |
| Pavel David | 0 | 0 | 0 | 0 | 0 | 0 | 0 | 0 | 0 | |
| Dieter Frey | 3 | 0 | 0 | 3 | 0 | 0 | 0 | 0 | 0 | |
| David Jarolim | 5 | 1 | 0 | 5 | 1 | 0 | 0 | 0 | 0 | |
| Jésus Júnior | 2 | 0 | 0 | 2 | 0 | 0 | 0 | 0 | 0 | |
| Jacek Krzynówek | 1 | 0 | 0 | 1 | 0 | 0 | 0 | 0 | 0 | |
| Michael Kügler | 0 | 0 | 0 | 0 | 0 | 0 | 0 | 0 | 0 | |
| Tommy Svindal Larsen | 0 | 0 | 0 | 0 | 0 | 0 | 0 | 0 | 0 | |
| Lars Müller | 0 | 0 | 0 | 4 | 0 | 0 | 0 | 0 | 0 | |
| Rade Todorović | 2 | 0 | 0 | 1 | 0 | 0 | 1 | 0 | 0 | |
| Milan Belić | 2 | 0 | 0 | 2 | 0 | 0 | 0 | 0 | 0 | |
| Cacau | 8 | 0 | 0 | 8 | 0 | 0 | 0 | 0 | 0 | |
| Saša Ćirić | 1 | 1 | 0 | 1 | 1 | 0 | 0 | 0 | 0 | |
| Martin Driller | 0 | 0 | 0 | 0 | 0 | 0 | 0 | 0 | 0 | |
| Stefan Kießling | 0 | 0 | 0 | 0 | 0 | 0 | 0 | 0 | 0 | |
| Kai Michalke | 1 | 0 | 0 | 1 | 0 | 0 | 0 | 0 | 0 | |
| Marco Villa | 1 | 0 | 0 | 1 | 0 | 0 | 0 | 0 | 0 | |
| Totals | 0 | 0 | 0 | 0 | 0 | 0 | 0 | 0 | 0 | — |
