= 2003–04 1. FC Nürnberg season =

1. FC Nürnberg
2003–04 season
- Head Coach: Wolfgang Wolf
- Stadium: Frankenstadion

The 2003–04 1. FC Nürnberg season happened from 4 August 2003 to 23 May 2004.

== Season review ==
The 2003–04 1. FC Nürnberg season started on 4 August 2003 against Karlsruher SC. Nürnberg won 3–2.

== Results ==
=== 2. Bundesliga ===
==== Results summary ====
Overall								Home						Away					
Pld	W	D	L	GF	GA	GD	Pts	W	D	L	GF	GA	GD	W	D	L	GF	GA	GD
34	18	7	9	68	45	+23	61	12	3	2	35	13	+22	6	4	7	33	32	+1

Last updated: 6 April 2018.
Source: kicker.de

==== 2. Bundesliga results ====
Date	Venue	Opponent	Results F–A	Goalscorers	Pos.	Ref.
4 August	Away	Karlsruhe	3–2	Ćirić 50'; Svindal Larsen 57'; David 60'	3	
10 August	Home	Wacker Burghausen	2–0	Krzynówek 45+1'; Ćirić 66'	1	
18 August	Away	Mainz	1–2	Krzynówek 57' (pen.)	4	
25 August	Home	Energie Cottbus	2–2	Krzynówek 11' (pen.); Mintál 68'	3	
14 September	Away	Erzgebirge Aue	3–3	Nikl 10'; Krzynówek 13', 58'	4	
22 September	Home	Greuther Fürth	1–1	Mintál 21'	6	
28 September	Away	Duisburg	1–2	Stehle 59'	9	
5 October	Home	Lübeck	1–2			
20 October	Away	Unterhaching	1–1			
24 October	Home	Jahn Regensburg	3–2			
2 November	Away	Eintracht Trier	2–0			
9 November	Home	Union Berlin	3–0			
24 November	Away	Alemannia Aachen	—	—		
1 December	Home	Arminia Bielefeld	1–0			
7 December	Home	Osnabrück	2–0			
12 December	Away	Rot-Weiß Oberhausen	1–3			
16 December	Home	Rot Weiss Ahlen	2–0			
26 January	Away	Alemannia Aachen	3–2			
1 February	Home	Karlsruhe	2–0			
6 February	Away	Wacker Burghausen	0–0	—		
16 February	Home	Mainz	2–2			
20 February	Away	Energie Cottbus	3–1			
27 February	Home	Erzgebirge Aue	2–0			
7 March	Away	Greuther Fürth	2–2			
14 March	Home	Duisburg	2–0			
22 March	Away	Lübeck	1–2			
28 March	Home	Unterhaching	3–0			
2 April	Away	Jahn Regensburg	1–2			
12 April	Home	Eintracht Trier	3–1			
18 April	Away	Union Berlin	5–3			
26 April	Home	Alemannia Aachen	3–0			
3 May	Away	Arminia Bielefeld	3–1			
7 May	Away	Osnabrück	4–3			
16 May	Home	Rot-Weiß Oberhausen	1–3			
23 May	Away	Rot Weiss Ahlen	0–2			

=== DFB-Pokal ===
Rd	Date	H/A	Opponent	Res. F–A	Goalscorers		Ref.
Rd	Date	H/A	Opponent	Res. F–A	Nürnberg	Opponent	Ref.
1	31 August	A	Füchse Reinickendorf	2–0	Krzynówek 49'; Allenberg 88' (o.g.)	—	
2	28 October	A	Bayern Munich	1–1 (6–7p)			

== Squad statistics ==
=== Matches played and goals scored ===
No.	Pos	Nat	Player	Total		2. Bundesliga		DFB-Pokal	
No.	Pos	Nat	Player	Apps	Goals	Apps	Goals	Apps	Goals
	GK	(Germany) GER	Darius Kampa	2	0	2	0	0	0
	GK	(Germany) GER	Raphael Schäfer	35	0	33	0	2	0
	DF	(Poland) POL	Tomasz Kos	1	0	1	0	0	0
	DF	(Poland) POL	Mariusz Kukiełka	15	1	14	1	1	0
	DF	(Czech Republic) CZE	Marek Nikl	30	2	28	2	2	0
	DF	(Germany) GER	Stephan Paßlack	8	0	7	0	1	0
	DF	(Germany) GER	Thomas Paulus	15	0	14	0	1	0
	DF	(Brazil) BRA	Rafael	2	0	2	0	0	0
	DF	(Germany) GER	Dominik Reinhardt	10	0	10	0	0	0
	DF	(United States) USA	Tony Sanneh	7	1	7	1	0	0
	DF	(Germany) GER	Thomas Stehle	27	2	25	2	2	0
	DF	(Germany) GER	Frank Wiblishauser	11	0	11	0	0	0
	DF	(Germany) GER	Christian Wiesner	3	0	3	0	0	0
	DF	(Germany) GER	Andreas Wolf	33	1	31	1	2	0
	MF	(Czech Republic) CZE	Pavel David	14	2	13	2	1	0
	MF	(Portugal) POR	Fernando	5	0	4	0	1	0
	MF	(Czech Republic) CZE	David Jarolím	5	0	4	0	1	0
	MF	(Poland) POL	Jacek Krzynówek	31	13	29	12	2	1
	MF	(Germany) GER	Michael Kügler	1	0	1	0	0	0
	MF	(Slovakia) SVK	Marek Mintál	33	18	31	18	2	0
	MF	(Germany) GER	Lars Müller	30	0	28	0	2	0
	MF	(Germany) GER	Sven Müller	16	1	16	1	0	0
	MF	(Germany) GER	Herbert Obele	2	0	2	0	0	0
	MF	(Slovakia) SVK	Samuel Slovak	17	1	17	1	0	0
	MF	(Croatia) CRO	Danijel Štefulj	16	2	16	2	0	0
	MF	(Norway) NOR	Tommy Svindal Larsen	31	1	29	1	2	0
	MF	(Morocco) MAR	Mehdi Taouil	6	0	6	0	0	0
	MF	(Brazil) BRA	Vlademir	2	0	1	0	1	0
	FW	(Ghana) GHA	Lawrence Aidoo	12	1	12	1	0	0
	FW	(North Macedonia) MKD	Saša Ćirić	22	9	20	9	2	0
	FW	(Germany) GER	Martin Driller	8	0	6	0	2	0
	FW	(Germany) GER	Stefan Kießling	14	2	14	2	0	0
	FW	(Turkey) TUR	Oktay	5	1	5	1	0	0
	FW	(Slovakia) SVK	Róbert Vittek	28	10	27	9	1	1

=== Bookings ===
Player	Total			2. Bundesliga			DFB-Pokal			Ref.
Player	Yellow card	(yellow card) (red card)	Red card	Yellow card	(yellow card) (red card)	Red card	Yellow card	(yellow card) (red card)	Red card	Ref.
Darius Kampa	0	0	0	0	0	0	0	0	0	
Raphael Schäfer	2	0	0	2	0	0	0	0	0	
Tomasz Kos	0	0	0	0	0	0	0	0	0	
Mariusz Kukiełka	2	1	0	2	1	0	0	0	0	
Marek Nikl	6	0	0	6	0	0	0	0	0	
Stephan Paßlack	1	0	0	1	0	0	0	0	0	
Thomas Paulus	2	1	1	2	1	1	0	0	0	
Rafael	0	0	0	0	0	0	0	0	0	
Dominik Reinhardt	0	0	0	0	0	0	0	0	0	
Tony Sanneh	0	0	0	0	0	0	0	0	0	
Thomas Stehle	10	0	0	8	0	0	2	0	0	
Frank Wiblishauser	0	0	0	0	0	0	0	0	0	
Christian Wiesner	1	0	0	1	0	0	0	0	0	
Andreas Wolf	13	1	0	13	1	0	0	0	0	
Pavel David	0	0	0	0	0	0	0	0	0	
Fernando	2	0	0	1	0	0	1	0	0	
David Jarolím	0	0	0	0	0	0	0	0	0	
Jacek Krzynówek	6	0	0	6	0	0	0	0	0	
Michael Kügler	0	0	0	0	0	0	0	0	0	
Marek Mintál	2	0	0	2	0	0	0	0	0	
Lars Müller	3	0	0	3	0	0	0	0	0	
Sven Müller	5	0	0	5	0	0	0	0	0	
Herbert Obele	0	0	0	0	0	0	0	0	0	
Samuel Slovak	2	0	0	2	0	0	0	0	0	
Danijel Štefulj	2	0	0	2	0	0	0	0	0	
Tommy Svindal Larsen	11	0	0	10	0	0	10	0	0	
Mehdi Taouil	0	0	0	0	0	0	0	0	0	
Vlademir	0	0	0	0	0	0	0	0	0	
Lawrence Aidoo	3	0	0	3	0	0	0	0	0	
Saša Ćirić	0	0	1	0	0	1	0	0	0	
Martin Driller	1	0	0	1	0	0	0	0	0	
Stefan Kießling	2	0	0	2	0	0	0	0	0	
Oktay	1	0	0	1	0	0	0	0	0	
Róbert Vittek	5	0	0	5	0	0	0	0	0	
