= 2003–04 FC Bayern Munich season =

104th season in existence of Bayern Munich

Bayern Munich
2003–04 season
- Manager: Ottmar Hitzfeld
- Bundesliga: 2nd
- DFB-Pokal: Quarter-finals
- DFB-Ligapokal: Semi-finals
- UEFA Champions League: Round of 16
- Top goalscorer: League: Roy Makaay (23); All: Roy Makaay (31)
Home colours	Away colours	Third colours

FC Bayern Munich did not win any trophies in the 2003–04 season, but nevertheless qualified for the next years' Champions League. The biggest disappointment was losing 3–1 at home to champions Werder Bremen at the end of the season, being three goals down after just 35 minutes. New signing Roy Makaay scored 23 league goals, adapting smoothly to Bundesliga, but the defensive performances were not good enough to overhaul Werder Bremen at the end of the season.

== Results ==
=== Bundesliga ===
==== League results ====
Match	Date	Ground	Opponent	Score^{1}	Pos.	Pts.	GD	Report
1	1 August	H	Eintracht Frankfurt	3 – 1	4	3	2	Report / Report link; Kick off / 20:30 CEST; Attendance / 63,000 (sell-out); Referee / Knut Kircher; Bayern Munich / Eintracht Frankfurt; Zé Roberto 16'; Salihamidžić 20'; Pizarro 42'; Hargreaves (yellow card) 75' / Schur (yellow card) 36'; Keller (yellow card) 62'; Skela 68'
2	9 August	A	Hannover 96	3 – 3	5	4	2	Report / Report link; Kick off / 15:30 CEST; Attendance / 23,217 (sell-out); Referee / Jürgen Aust; Hannover 96 / Bayern Munich; Krupniković 9' (yellow card) 73'; Štajner 26'; Christiansen 43'; Idrissou (red card) 83' de Guzman (yellow card) 15' / Ballack 39'; Pizarro 49'; Élber (yellow card) 68'; Hargreaves 90+2'
3	16 August	H	VfL Bochum	2 – 0	3	7	4	Report / Report link; Kick off / 15:30 CEST; Attendance / 63,000 (sell-out); Referee / Peter Gagelmann; Bayern Munich / VfL Bochum; Pizarro 20'; Deisler 26'; Lizarazu (yellow card) 42'; Linke (yellow card) 52' / Fahrenhorst (yellow card) 16'
4	24 August	A	Hamburger SV	2 – 0	2	10	6	Report / Report link; Kick off / 17:00 CEST; Attendance / 55,500 (sell-out); Referee / Markus Merk; Hamburger SV / Bayern Munich; Hoogma (yellow card) 35'; Benjamin (yellow card) 52' (red card); Wicky (yellow card) 90' / Pizarro 14'; Zé Roberto (yellow card) 45'; Ballack (yellow card) 71'; Élber 78'; Linke (yellow card) 87'
5	13 September	A	VfL Wolfsburg	2 – 3	5	10	5	Report / Report link; Kick off / 15:30 CEST; Attendance / 30,000 (sell-out); Referee / Lutz Michael Fröhlich; VfL Wolfsburg / Bayern Munich; Baiano 11', 84'; Thiam (yellow card) 53'; Petrov (yellow card) 62'; Klimowicz 89' / Linke (yellow card) 18'; Rau (yellow card) 30'; Schweinsteiger (yellow card) 31' (goal) 49'; Makaay 59'
6	20 September	H	Bayer Leverkusen	3 – 3	5	11	5	Report / Report link; Kick off / 15:30 CEST; Attendance / 63,000 (sell-out); Referee / Florian Meyer; Bayern Munich / Bayer Leverkusen; Makaay 25'; Ballack (yellow card) 33' (goal) 69'; Kovač (yellow card) 37'; Zé Roberto (red card) 57'; Santa Cruz 64'; Sagnol (yellow card) 86' / Juan (yellow card) 5'; Ramelow 10' (yellow card) 40'; França 34'; Ponte (yellow card) 45'; Baştürk (yellow card) 79' (goal) 81'
7	27 September	A	Hansa Rostock	2 – 1	4	14	6	Report / Report link; Kick off / 15:30 CEST; Attendance / 29,000 (sell-out); Referee / Herbert Fandel; Hansa Rostock / Bayern Munich; Melkam (yellow card) 45'; Linke 47' (o.g.); Lantz (yellow card) 59'; Kientz (yellow card) 86' / Santa Cruz 30'; Ballack (yellow card) 34'; Demichelis (yellow card) 57'; Makaay 86'
8	4 October	H	Hertha BSC	4 – 1	4	17	9	Report / Report link; Kick off / 15:30 CEST; Attendance / 63,000 (sell-out); Referee / Michael Weiner; Bayern Munich / Hertha BSC; Makaay 21'; Ballack 45+1'; Salihamidžić (yellow card) 51' (goal) 88'; Schweinsteiger 58'; Lizarazu (yellow card) 61' / Hartmann (yellow card) 44'; N. Kovač 65'; Pinto (yellow card) 87'
9	18 October	A	Borussia Mönchengladbach	0 – 0	5	18	9	Report / Report link; Kick off / 15:30 CEST; Attendance / 34,500 (sell-out); Referee / Knut Kircher; Borussia Mönchengladbach / Bayern Munich; Strasser (yellow card) 56' / Salihamidžić (yellow card) 28'
10	25 October	H	1. FC Kaiserslautern	4 – 1	4	21	12	Report / Report link; Kick off / 15:30 CEST; Attendance / 58,000; Referee / Torsten Koop; Bayern Munich / 1. FC Kaiserslautern; Deisler 1', 69'; Makaay 27', 80'; Demichelis (yellow card) 75' / Hengen (yellow card) 69'; Klose 78'
11	1 November	A	Schalke 04	0 – 2	5	21	10	Report / Report link; Kick off / 15:30 CET; Attendance / 61,266 (sell-out); Referee / Edgar Steinborn; Schalke 04 / Bayern Munich; Hajto 16' (pen.) (yellow card) 39'; Kobiashvili (yellow card) 36'; Wałdoch (yellow card) 53'; Oude Kamphuis 80' / Kovač (yellow card) 31'; Linke (red card) 32'; Demichelis (yellow card) 57'; Lizarazu (yellow card) 63'
12	9 November	H	Borussia Dortmund	4 – 1	4	24	13	Report / Report link; Kick off / 17:30 CET; Attendance / 63,000 (sell-out); Referee / Markus Merk; Bayern Munich / Borussia Dortmund; Ballack 27'; Sagnol 50'; Salihamidžić 72' (yellow card) 90'; Pizarro 90+1' / Fernández (yellow card) 27'; Ewerthon (yellow card) 29'; Brzenska (yellow card) (red card) 43'; Koller 47'
13	22 November	A	1860 Munich	1 – 0	4	27	14	Kick off / 15:30 CET; Attendance / 69,000 (sell-out); Referee / Herbert Fandel; 1860 Munich / Bayern Munich; Stranzl (yellow card) 38'; Görlitz (yellow card) 60' (red card) / Makaay 34' (yellow card) 45'; Ballack (yellow card) 39'; Salihamidžić (red card) 60'
14	29 November	H	1. FC Köln	2 – 2	4	28	14	Report / Report link; Kick off / 15:30 CET; Attendance / 48,000; Referee / Uwe Kemmling; Bayern Munich / 1. FC Köln; Pizarro 42', 49' / Voronin 35'; Springer (yellow card) 41' (goal) 60'; Cichon (yellow card) 79'
15	6 December	A	Werder Bremen	1 – 1	4	29	14	Report / Report link; Kick off / 15:30 CET; Attendance / 43,000 (sell-out); Referee / Knut Kircher; Werder Bremen / Bayern Munich; Ailton 58' (pen.); Lisztes (yellow card) 75' / Kuffour (yellow card) 40'; Hargreaves (yellow card) 71'; Pizarro 78'
16	13 December	H	VfB Stuttgart	1 – 0	4	32	15	Report / Report link; Kick off / 15:30 CET; Attendance / 63,000 (sell-out); Referee / Markus Merk; Bayern Munich / VfB Stuttgart; Salihamidžić (yellow card) 7'; Ballack (yellow card) 59'; Makaay 75'; Sagnol (yellow card) 75' / Szabics (yellow card) 58'; Hinkel (yellow card) 78'
17	16 December	A	SC Freiburg	6 – 0	2	35	21	Report / Report link; Kick off / 20:00 CET; Attendance / 25,000 (sell-out); Referee / Florian Meyer; Bayern Munich / SC Freiburg; Demichelis 7'; Salihamidžić 23'; Makaay 28', 67'; Rau (yellow card) 34'; Pizarro 61'; Trochowski 87' / Diarra (yellow card) 24'
18	31 January	A	Eintracht Frankfurt	1 – 1	3	36	21	Report / Report link; Kick off / 15:30 CET; Attendance / 37,280 (sell-out); Referee / Jürgen Jansen; Eintracht Frankfurt / Bayern Munich; Bürger (yellow card) 35'; Nikolov (yellow card) 38'; Schur (yellow card) 39'; Skela 45' (pen.); Günther (yellow card) 72' / Makaay 1'; Demichelis (yellow card) 25'; Ballack (yellow card) 33'
19	8 February	H	Hannover 96	3 – 1	2	39	23	Report / Report link; Kick off / 17:30 CET; Attendance / 32,000; Referee / Lutz Michael Fröhlich; Bayern Munich / Hannover 96; Ballack 10' (yellow card) 77' (red card); Zé Roberto 66'; Makaay 78' / Cherundolo (yellow card) 26'; Svitlica 82' de Guzman (yellow card) 90' (red card)
20	14 February	A	VfL Bochum	0 – 1	2	39	22	Report / Report link; Kick off / 15:30 CET; Attendance / 32,645 (sell-out); Referee / Lutz Wagner; VfL Bochum / Bayern Munich; Madsen 8'; Hashemian (yellow card) 37'; Wosz (yellow card) 45'; Edu (yellow card) 56' / Schweinsteiger (yellow card) 37'
21	21 February	H	Hamburger SV	1 – 0	2	42	23	Report / Report link; Kick off / 15:30 CET; Attendance / 36,000; Referee / Knut Kircher; Bayern Munich / Hamburger SV; Hargreaves (yellow card) 45'; Kuffour (yellow card) 62'; Demichelis 87' / Wicky (yellow card) 65'; Hollerbach (yellow card) 81'
22	28 February	H	VfL Wolfsburg	2 – 0	2	45	25	Report / Report link; Kick off / 15:30 CET; Attendance / 32,000; Referee / Thorsten Kinhöfer; Bayern Munich / VfL Wolfsburg; Makaay 11'; Sagnol (yellow card) 30'; Demichelis (yellow card) 37'; Jeremies (yellow card) 75'; Schweinsteiger 76' / Rytter (yellow card) 18'; Topić (yellow card) 30'; Biliškov (yellow card) 45'
23	6 March	A	Bayer Leverkusen	3 – 1	2	48	27	Report / Report link; Kick off / 15:30 CET; Attendance / 22,500 (sell-out); Referee / Herbert Fandel; Bayer Leverkusen / Bayern Munich; Fritz (yellow card) 20'; Balitsch (yellow card) 82'; Schneider 90+1' / Zé Roberto (yellow card) 7'; Makaay 40', 77'; Hargreaves (yellow card) 41'; Ballack 58'
24	13 March	H	Hansa Rostock	3 – 3	2	49	27	Report / Report link; Kick off / 15:30 CET; Attendance / 41,000 (sell-out); Referee / Uwe Kemmling; Bayern Munich / Hansa Rostock; Jeremies 3'; Makaay 9', 76' (pen.) / Maul (yellow card) 41'; Max 53'; Arvidsson 65' (yellow card) 71'; Rasmussen 72'; Persson (yellow card) 84'
25	20 March	A	Hertha BSC	1 – 1	2	50	27	Report / Report link; Kick off / 15:30 CET; Attendance / 60,800 (sell-out); Referee / Jürgen Jansen; Hertha BSC / Bayern Munich; Marcelinho 42' (pen.); Rafael (yellow card) 49' / Makaay 8'; Sagnol (yellow card) 21'; Schweinsteiger (yellow card) 42'; Lizarazu (yellow card) 69'
26	27 March	H	Borussia Mönchengladbach	5 – 2	2	53	30	Report / Report link; Kick off / 15:30 CET; Attendance / 56,000; Referee / Michael Weiner; Bayern Munich / Borussia Mönchengladbach; Kuffour 21' (yellow card) 83'; Santa Cruz 39'; Makaay 48' (pen.); Hargreaves 88'; Ballack 90' / Carnell (yellow card) 53'; Svěrkoš 54', 65' (pen.)
27	3 April	A	1. FC Kaiserslautern	2 – 0	2	56	32	Report / Report link; Kick off / 15:30 CEST; Attendance / 47,315 (sell-out); Referee / Lutz Michael Fröhlich; 1. FC Kaiserslautern / Bayern Munich; Malz (yellow card) 28' (red card); Bjelica (yellow card) 51' / Makaay 47'; Jeremies (yellow card) 60'; Santa Cruz 77'; Kahn (yellow card) 87'
28	10 April	H	Schalke 04	2 – 1	2	59	33	Report / Report link; Kick off / 15:30 CEST; Attendance / 63,000 (sell-out); Referee / Stefan Trautmann; Bayern Munich / Schalke 04; Makaay 8', 64' / Vermant 4' (pen.); Rodríguez (yellow card) 33'
29	17 April	A	Borussia Dortmund	0 – 2	2	59	31	Report / Report link; Kick off / 15:30 CEST; Attendance / 83,000 (sell-out); Referee / Markus Merk; Borussia Dortmund / Bayern Munich; Dedê (yellow card) 7'; Ewerthon 55' (pen.); Wörns 61' / Kuffour (yellow card) 6'; Jeremies (yellow card) 58'; Ballack (yellow card) 68' (red card)
30	25 April	H	1860 Munich	1 – 0	2	62	32	Report / Report link; Kick off / 17:30 CEST; Attendance / 69,000 (sell-out); Referee / Jürgen Jansen; Bayern Munich / 1860 Munich; Santa Cruz 50'; Schweinsteiger (yellow card) 64' / Stranzl (yellow card) 40'; Costa (yellow card) 53'; Meyer (yellow card) 63'
31	1 May	A	1. FC Köln	2 – 1	2	65	33	Report / Report link; Kick off / 15:30 CEST; Attendance / 50,200 (sell-out); Referee / Thorsten Kinhöfer; 1. FC Köln / Bayern Munich; Doğan (yellow card) 14'; Podolski 24'; Sinkala (yellow card) 71'; Sinkiewicz (yellow card) 72' / Pizarro (yellow card) 14' (goal) 40'; Kahn (yellow card) 44'; Schweinsteiger 75'
32	8 May	H	Werder Bremen	1 – 3	2	65	31	Report / Report link; Kick off / 15:30 CEST; Attendance / 65,000 (sell-out); Referee / Edgar Steinborn; Bayern Munich / Werder Bremen; Ballack (yellow card) 44'; Makaay 56' / Klasnić 19' (yellow card) 59'; Micoud 26'; Ailton 35' (yellow card) 35'; Ismaël (yellow card) 57'
33	15 May	A	VfB Stuttgart	1 – 3	2	65	29	Report / Report link; Kick off / 15:30 CEST; Attendance / 48,400 (sell-out); Referee / Lutz Michael Fröhlich; VfB Stuttgart / Bayern Munich; Heldt (yellow card) 11'; Szabics 19', 52'; Kurányi 54' / Zé Roberto (yellow card) 19'; Ballack (yellow card) 39'; Salihamidžić (yellow card) 41'; Hargreaves (yellow card) 41'; Jeremies (yellow card) 69'; Pizarro (yellow card) 76' (goal) 77'
34	22 May	H	SC Freiburg	2 – 0	2	68	31	Report / Report link; Kick off / 15:30 CEST; Attendance / 63,000 (sell-out); Referee / Michael Weiner; Bayern Munich / SC Freiburg; Deisler 18'; Jeremies (yellow card) 37'; Kovač (yellow card) 67'; Lizarazu 73' (pen.) (yellow card) 74' / Müller (yellow card) 44'

^{1}Bayern Munich goals come first.
Ground's country's flag and opponent's country's flag shown when from a different country of Bayern Munich.
Pos. = Position in league, Pts. = Points, GD = Goal difference, Ground: H = Home, A = Away, N = Neutral, HR = Home replacement, AR = Away replacement.

=== DFB-Pokal ===
30 August 1st Round	Borussia Neunkirchen	0–5	Bayern Munich	Neunkirchen
17:45 CEST		Report	Santa Cruz 10', 61', 69'; Ballack 13' (pen.); Scholl 75'	Stadium: Ellenfeldstadion; Attendance: 23,400; Referee: Stephan Kammerer

28 October 2nd Round	Bayern Munich	1–1 (a.e.t.) (7–6 p)	1. FC Nürnberg	Munich
19:30 CET	Makaay 36'; Kovač (yellow card); Santa Cruz (yellow card)	Report	Vittek 11'; Stehle (yellow card)	Stadium: Olympiastadion; Attendance: 24,000; Referee: Jürgen Aust
	Penalties
	Salihamidžić (penalty scored); Ballack (penalty missed); Deisler (penalty scored); Santa Cruz (penalty scored); Makaay (penalty scored); Jeremies (penalty missed); Trochowski (penalty scored); Linke (penalty scored); Kovač (penalty scored)		(penalty scored) Paßlack; (penalty scored) Krzynówek; (penalty missed) Müller; (penalty scored) Vittek; (penalty scored) Ćirić; (penalty missed) Wolf; (penalty scored) Paulus; (penalty scored) Mintál; (penalty missed) Nikl

3 December Round of 16	Bayern Munich	3–0	Hamburger SV	Munich
20:30 CET	Pizarro 28'; Makaay 47'; Salihamidžić 73'	Report	Maltritz (yellow card) 67'; Barbarez (yellow card) 68'	Stadium: Olympiastadion; Attendance: 8,000; Referee: Lutz Wagner

4 February Quarterfinals	Alemannia Aachen	2–1	Bayern Munich	Aachen
20:30 CET	Blank 33'; Brinkmann (yellow card) 49'; Meijer 81' (yellow card) 88'	Report	Ballack 45+1' (yellow card) 60'; Jeremies (yellow card) 47'; Sagnol (yellow card) 67'	Stadium: Old Tivoli; Attendance: 20,400; Referee: Michael Weiner

=== DFB-Ligapokal ===
22 July Semifinals	Bayern Munich	3–3 (a.e.t.) (1–4 p)	Hamburger SV	Jena
19:45 CEST	Hargreaves (yellow card) 18'; Ballack 24' (pen.), 90' (pen.); Élber 69'; Schweinsteiger (yellow card) 77'; Kuffour (yellow card) 79'		Beinlich (yellow card) 20'; Romeo 41', 52'; Barbarez 66'; Kling (yellow card) 90'	Stadium: Ernst-Abbe-Sportfeld; Attendance: 11,850; Referee: Jürgen Jansen
	Penalties
	Salihamidžić (penalty scored); Ballack (penalty missed); Hargreaves (penalty missed)		(penalty scored) Rahn; (penalty scored) Hoogma; (penalty scored) Maltritz; (penalty scored) Mahdavikia

=== Champions League ===
==== Group stage results ====
Pos	Team	Pld	W	D	L	GF	GA	GD	Pts	Qualification	LYO	BAY	CEL	AND
1	(France) Lyon	6	3	1	2	7	7	0	10	Advance to knockout stage	—	1–1	3–2	1–0
2	(Germany) Bayern Munich	6	2	3	1	6	5	+1	9	Advance to knockout stage	1–2	—	2–1	1–0
3	(Scotland) Celtic	6	2	1	3	8	7	+1	7	Transfer to UEFA Cup	2–0	0–0	—	3–1
4	(Belgium) Anderlecht	6	2	1	3	4	6	−2	7		1–0	1–1	1–0	—

Source: RSSSF

===== League results =====
Match	Date	Ground	Opponent	Score^{1}	Pos.	Pts.	GD	Report
1	17 September	H	Celtic (Scotland)	2 – 1	1	3	1	Report / Report link; Kick off / 20:45 CEST; Attendance / 48,000; Referee / Massimo De Santis (Italy); Bayern Munich / Celtic; Makaay 73', 86' / Sutton (yellow card) 35'; Thompson 57'
2	30 September	A (Belgium)	Anderlecht (Belgium)	1 – 1	1	4	1	Report / Report link; Kick off / 20:45 CEST; Attendance / 21,788 (sell-out); Referee / Luis Medina Cantalejo (Spain); Anderlecht / Bayern Munich; Hasi (yellow card) 7'; Mornar 53'; Hendrikx (yellow card) 57' / Pizarro (yellow card) 36' (red card); Kuffour (yellow card) 43'; Santa Cruz 74'
3	21 October	A (France)	Lyon (France)	1 – 1	1	5	1	Report / Report link; Kick off / 20:45 CEST; Attendance / 37,659; Referee / Ľuboš Micheľ (Slovakia); Lyon / Bayern Munich; Malouda (yellow card) 51'; Réveillère (yellow card) 55'; Luyindula 88' / Demichelis (yellow card) 23'; Makaay 25'; Santa Cruz (yellow card) 39'; Kovač (yellow card) 45+1'
4	5 November	H	Lyon (France)	1 – 2	3	5	0	Report / Report link; Kick off / 20:45 CET; Attendance / 59,000 (sell-out); Referee / Graham Barber (England); Bayern Munich / Lyon; Makaay 14'; Salihamidžić (yellow card) 62'; Sagnol (yellow card) 62'; Jeremies (yellow card) 78'; Kovač (yellow card) 87'; Lizarazu (yellow card) 90+2'; Ballack (yellow card) 90+3' / Juninho 6' (yellow card) 37'; Réveillère (yellow card) 34'; Élber 53'
5	25 November	A (Scotland)	Celtic (Scotland)	0 – 0	4	6	0	Report / Report link; Kick off / 20:45 CET; Attendance / 60,506 (sell-out); Referee / René Temmink (Netherlands); Celtic / Bayern Munich; Thompson (yellow card) 61' / Sagnol (yellow card) 54'; Kuffour (yellow card) 56'; Lizarazu (yellow card) 60'; Kahn (yellow card) 90+2'
6	10 December	H	Anderlecht (Belgium)	1 – 0	2	9	1	Report / Report link; Kick off / 20:45 CET; Attendance / 52,000; Referee / Kim Milton Nielsen (Denmark); Bayern Munich / Anderlecht; Makaay 42' (pen.) (yellow card) 85' / Tihinen (yellow card) 40'; Zetterberg (yellow card) 41'; Baseggio (yellow card) 45+2'

^{1}Bayern Munich goals come first.
Ground's country's flag and opponent's country's flag shown when from a different country of Bayern Munich.
Pos. = Position in league, Pts. = Points, GD = Goal difference, Ground: H = Home, A = Away, N = Neutral, HR = Home replacement, AR = Away replacement.

==== Knockout stage results ====
===== Round of 16 =====
24 February 1st leg	Bayern Munich	1–1	(Spain) Real Madrid	Munich, Germany
20:45 CET	Ballack (yellow card) 26'; Demichelis (yellow card) 60'; Makaay 75'	Report	Zidane (yellow card) 49'; Carlos 83'; Ronaldo (yellow card) 89'; Figo (yellow card) 89'	Stadium: Olympiastadion; Attendance: 59,000; Referee: Terje Hauge (Norway)

10 March 2nd leg	Real Madrid (Spain)	1–0 (2–1 agg.)	Bayern Munich	Madrid, Spain
20:45 CET	Salgado (yellow card) 15'; Zidane 32'	Report	Zé Roberto (yellow card) 14'; Lizarazu (yellow card) 69'	Stadium: Santiago Bernabéu Stadium; Attendance: 75,000; Referee: Urs Meier (Switzerland)

== Team statistics ==
Competition	First match	Last match	Starting round	Final position	Record							
Competition	First match	Last match	Starting round	Final position	G	W	D	L	GF	GA	GD	Win %
Bundesliga	1 August	22 May	Matchday 1	2nd	34	20	8	6	70	39	+31	58.82
DFB-Pokal	30 August	4 February	First round	Quarterfinals	4	2	1	1	10	3	+7	50.00
DFB-Ligapokal	22 July	22 July	Semifinals	Semifinals	1	0	1	0	3	3	+0	0.00
Champions League	17 September	10 March	Group stage	Round of 16	8	2	4	2	7	7	+0	25.00
Total					47	24	14	9	90	52	+38	51.06

== Squad statistics ==
=== Squad, appearances and goals ===
No.	Player	Total				Bundesliga				DFB-Pokal				DFB-Ligapokal				Champions League			
No.	Player	TA	ST	SB	G	TA	ST	SB	G	TA	ST	SB	G	TA	ST	SB	G	TA	ST	SB	G
Goalkeepers
1	Oliver Kahn (C)	46	46	0	0	33	33	0	0	4	4	0	0	1	1	0	0	8	8	0	0
22	Michael Rensing	2	1	1	0	2	1	1	0	0	0	0	0	0	0	0	0	0	0	0	0
36	Jan Schlösser	0	0	0	0	0	0	0	0	0	0	0	0	0	0	0	0	0	0	0	0
Defenders
2	Willy Sagnol	30	24	6	1	21	17	4	1	3	2	1	0	0	0	0	0	6	5	1	0
3	Bixente Lizarazu	35	35	0	1	26	26	0	1	1	1	0	0	0	0	0	0	8	8	0	0
4	Samuel Kuffour	33	32	1	1	23	22	1	1	2	2	0	0	1	1	0	0	7	7	0	0
5	Robert Kovač	28	28	0	0	19	19	0	0	2	2	0	0	0	0	0	0	7	0	0	0
6	Martín Demichelis	21	17	4	2	14	10	4	2	2	2	0	0	0	0	0	0	5	5	0	0
25	Thomas Linke	28	25	3	0	21	18	3	0	2	2	0	0	1	1	0	0	4	4	0	0
30	Christian Lell	5	1	4	0	4	0	4	0	1	1	0	0	0	0	0	0	0	0	0	0
Midfielders
7	Mehmet Scholl	9	4	5	1	5	1	4	0	2	2	0	1	1	1	0	0	1	0	1	0
11	Zé Roberto	40	37	3	2	30	27	3	2	2	2	0	0	1	1	0	0	7	7	0	0
13	Michael Ballack	40	40	0	11	28	28	0	7	3	3	0	2	1	1	0	2	8	8	0	0
15	Tobias Rau	11	7	4	0	8	5	3	0	2	2	0	0	0	0	0	0	1	0	1	0
16	Jens Jeremies	30	19	11	1	23	15	8	1	2	2	0	0	1	1	0	0	4	1	3	0
17	Thorsten Fink	1	0	1	0	1	0	1	0	0	0	0	0	0	0	0	0	0	0	0	0
20	Hasan Salihamidžić	46	36	10	5	33	28	5	4	4	3	1	1	1	1	0	0	8	4	4	0
23	Owen Hargreaves	35	35	0	2	25	25	0	2	3	3	0	0	1	1	0	0	6	6	0	0
26	Sebastian Deisler	16	10	6	4	11	8	3	4	3	1	2	0	1	0	1	0	1	1	0	0
31	Bastian Schweinsteiger	33	20	13	4	26	19	7	4	3	1	2	0	1	0	1	0	3	0	3	0
32	Markus Feulner	2	0	2	0	2	0	2	0	0	0	0	0	0	0	0	0	0	0	0	0
34	Piotr Trochowski	11	0	11	1	10	0	10	1	1	0	1	0	0	0	0	0	0	0	0	0
35	Zvjezdan Misimović	3	0	3	0	2	0	2	0	1	0	1	0	0	0	0	0	0	0	0	0
Forwards
9	Giovane Élber	5	3	2	2	4	2	2	1	0	0	0	0	1	1	0	1	0	0	0	0
10	Roy Makaay	44	43	1	31	32	31	1	23	4	4	0	2	0	0	0	0	8	8	0	6
14	Claudio Pizarro	43	27	16	12	31	18	13	11	4	2	2	1	1	1	0	0	7	6	1	0
21	Alexander Zickler	0	0	0	0	0	0	0	0	0	0	0	0	0	0	0	0	0	0	0	0
24	Roque Santa Cruz	41	27	14	9	29	21	8	5	4	3	1	3	0	0	0	0	8	3	5	1
33	Paolo Guerrero	1	0	1	0	0	0	0	0	1	0	1	0	0	0	0	0	0	0	0	0

=== Minutes played ===
Player	Total	Bundesliga	DFB-Pokal	DFB-Ligapokal	Champions League
Oliver Kahn	4,171	2,941	390	120	720
Roy Makaay	3,887	2,777	390	0	720
Michael Ballack	3,610	2,470	300	120	720
Hasan Salihamidžić	3,406	2,551	317	120	418
Owen Hargreaves	3,382	2,243	250	120	469
Zé Roberto	3,109	2,319	210	120	580
Bixente Lizarazu	3,001	2,257	84	0	660
Samuel Kuffour	2,924	2,011	180	120	613
Claudio Pizarro	2,483	1,739	181	120	443
Robert Kovač	2,483	1,643	210	0	630
Roque Santa Cruz	2,463	1,825	283	0	355
Thomas Linke	2,308	1,618	210	120	360
Willy Sagnol	2,088	1,470	187	0	431
Jens Jeremies	1,893	1,472	200	69	152
Bastian Schweinsteiger	1,824	1,578	113	51	82
Martín Demichelis	1,423	855	180	0	388
Sebastian Deisler	873	590	142	51	90
Tobias Rau	587	408	163	0	16
Mehmet Scholl	393	148	158	69	18
Giovane Élber	327	207	0	120	0
Christian Lell	191	71	120	0	0
Piotr Trochowski	143	143	0	0	0
Michael Rensing	119	119	0	0	0
Markus Feulner	30	30	0	0	0
Thorsten Fink	18	18	0	0	0
Paolo Guerrero	14	0	14	0	0
Zvjezdan Misimović	9	1	8	0	0
Jan Schlösser	0	0	0	0	0
Alexander Zickler	0	0	0	0	0

=== Discipline ===
==== Bookings ====
Player	Total			Bundesliga			DFB-Pokal			DFB-Ligapokal			Champions League		
Player	Yellow card	(yellow card) (red card)	Red card	Yellow card	(yellow card) (red card)	Red card	Yellow card	(yellow card) (red card)	Red card	Yellow card	(yellow card) (red card)	Red card	Yellow card	(yellow card) (red card)	Red card
Michael Ballack	11	2	0	8	2	0	1	0	0	0	0	0	2	0	0
Bixente Lizarazu	8	0	0	5	0	0	0	0	0	0	0	0	3	0	0
Samuel Kuffour	7	0	0	4	0	0	0	0	0	1	0	0	2	0	0
Jens Jeremies	7	0	0	5	0	0	1	0	0	0	0	0	1	0	0
Willy Sagnol	7	0	0	4	0	0	1	0	0	0	0	0	2	0	0
Martín Demichelis	7	0	0	5	0	0	0	0	0	0	0	0	2	0	0
Hasan Salihamidžić	6	0	1	5	0	1	0	0	0	0	0	0	1	0	0
Owen Hargreaves	6	0	0	5	0	0	0	0	0	1	0	0	0	0	0
Robert Kovač	6	0	0	3	0	0	1	0	0	0	0	0	2	0	0
Bastian Schweinsteiger	5	0	0	4	0	0	0	0	0	1	0	0	0	0	0
Zé Roberto	4	0	1	3	0	1	0	0	0	0	0	0	1	0	0
Thomas Linke	3	0	1	3	0	1	0	0	0	0	0	0	0	0	0
Oliver Kahn	3	0	0	2	0	0	0	0	0	0	0	0	1	0	0
Claudio Pizarro	2	1	0	2	0	0	0	0	0	0	0	0	0	1	0
Tobias Rau	2	0	0	2	0	0	0	0	0	0	0	0	0	0	0
Roy Makaay	2	0	0	1	0	0	0	0	0	0	0	0	1	0	0
Sebastian Deisler	1	0	0	0	0	0	1	0	0	0	0	0	0	0	0
Giovane Élber	1	0	0	1	0	0	0	0	0	0	0	0	0	0	0
Roque Santa Cruz	1	0	0	0	0	0	0	0	0	0	0	0	1	0	0

==== Suspensions ====
No.	Player	No. of matches served	Reason	Competition served in	Date served	Opponent(s)	Source
11	Zé Roberto	2	Red card vs. Bayer Leverkusen	Bundesliga	27 September	Hansa Rostock	
11	Zé Roberto	2	Red card vs. Bayer Leverkusen	Bundesliga	4 October	Hertha BSC	
14	Claudio Pizarro	1	Red card vs Anderlecht	Champions League	21 October	Lyon	
25	Thomas Linke	1	Red card vs. FC Schalke 04	Bundesliga	9 November	Borussia Dortmund	
13	Michael Ballack	1	5th yellow card	Bundesliga	16 December	SC Freiburg	
13	Michael Ballack	1	Red card vs Hannover 96	Bundesliga	14 February	VfL Bochum	
6	Martín Demichelis	1	5th yellow card	Bundesliga	6 March	Bayer Leverkusen	
13	Michael Ballack	1	Red card vs Borussia Dortmund	Bundesliga	25 April	1860 Munich	
23	Owen Hargreaves	1	5th yellow card	Bundesliga	22 May	SC Freiburg	
20	Hasan Salihamidžić	1	5th yellow card	Bundesliga	22 May	SC Freiburg	

=== Transfers ===
==== In ====
First Team

No.	Pos.	Nat.	Name	Age	EU	Moving from	Type	Transfer window	Ends	Transfer fee	Source
10	FW	(Netherlands)	Roy Makaay	28	EU	Deportivo La Coruña (Spain)	Transfer	Summer		€19.75 Million	
6	DF	(Argentina)	Martín Demichelis	22	EU	River Plate (Argentina)	Transfer	Summer		€5 Million	
15	MF	(Germany)	Tobias Rau	21	EU	VfL Wolfsburg	Transfer	Summer		€2.25 Million	
22	GK	(Germany)	Michael Rensing	19	EU	Youth system	Promotion	Summer		N/A	
30	DF	(Germany)	Christian Lell	18	EU	Youth system	Promotion	Summer		N/A	
34	DF	(Germany) (Poland)	Piotr Trochowski	19	EU	Youth system	Promotion	Summer		N/A	

==== Out ====
No.	Pos.	Nat.	Name	Age	EU	Moving to	Type	Transfer window	Transfer fee	Source
32	MF	(Germany)	Markus Feulner	21	EU	1. FC Köln	Transfer	Winter	€100,000	
9	FW	(Brazil)	Giovane Élber	31	Non-EU	Lyon (France)	Transfer	Summer	€4.2 Million	
29	DF	(Germany)	Philipp Lahm	19	EU	VfB Stuttgart	Loan	Summer	€200,000	
	DF	(Germany)	Alexander Bugera	24	EU	MSV Duisburg	Transfer	Summer	Free	
8	MF	(Croatia) (Germany)	Niko Kovač	31	EU	Hertha BSC	Transfer	Summer	Free	
33	GK	(Germany)	Stefan Wessels	24	EU	1. FC Köln	Transfer	Summer	Free	
18	MF	(Germany)	Michael Tarnat	33	EU	Manchester City (England)	Transfer	Summer	Free	
22	GK	(Germany)	Bernd Dreher	36	EU		Retirement	Summer	N/A	
