= Stefan Kießling =

German footballer (born 1984)

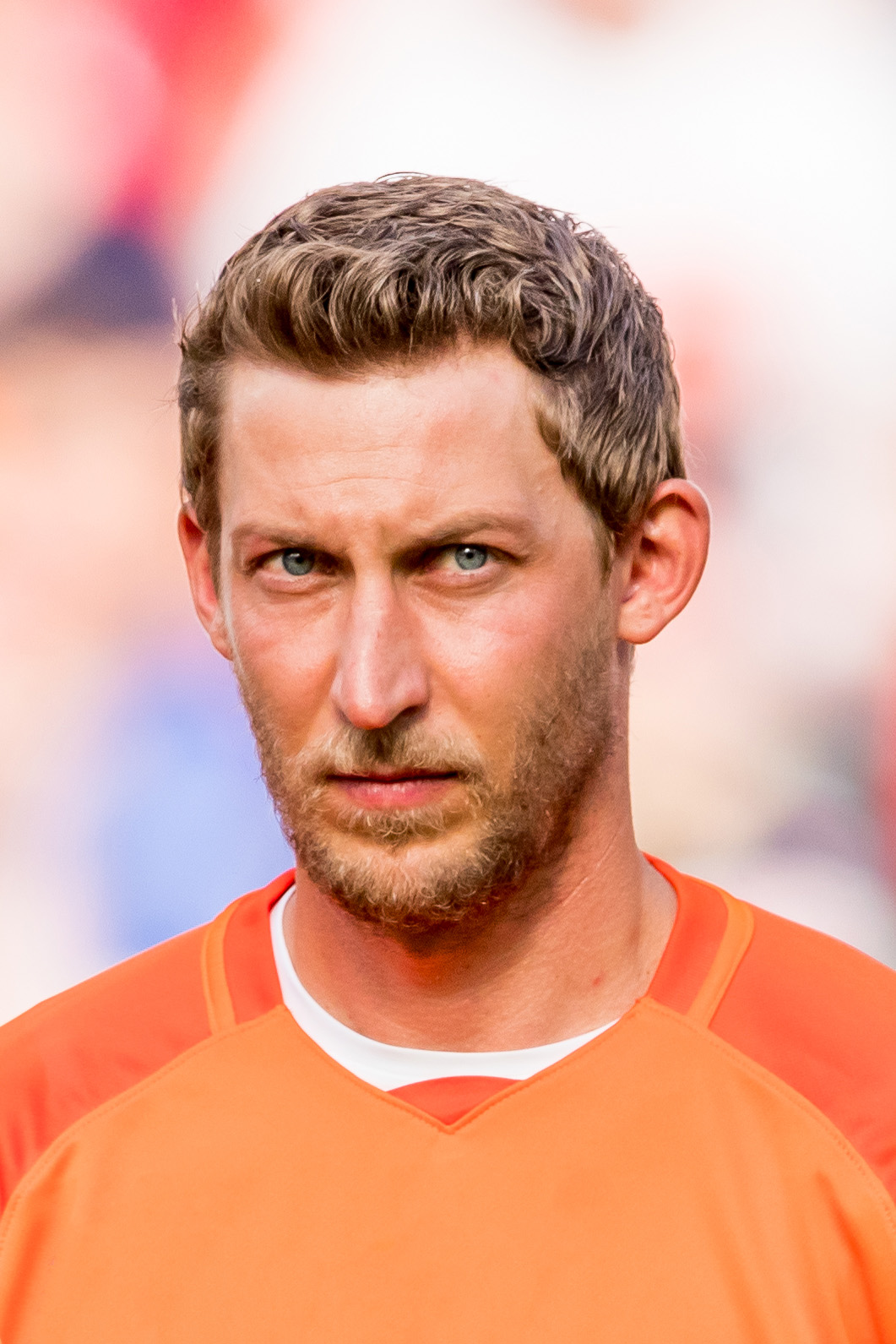
- Kießling in 2019

Personal information
- Full name: Stefan Kießling
- Date of birth: 25 January 1984 (age 42)
- Place of birth: Lichtenfels, West Germany
- Height: 1.91 m (6 ft 3 in)
- Position: Striker

Youth career
- 1988–2001: 1. FC Eintracht Bamberg
- 2001–2003: 1. FC Nürnberg

Senior career*
Years	Team	Apps	(Gls)
2003–2006	1. FC Nürnberg	73	(15)
2006–2018	Bayer Leverkusen	344	(131)
Total		417	(146)

International career
2003	Germany U20	1	(0)
2004	Germany Team 2006	1	(0)
2005–2006	Germany U21	15	(4)
2007–2010	Germany	6	(0)
Medal record
Men's football
Representing Germany
Third place	FIFA World Cup	2010
- * Club domestic league appearances and goals

Stefan Kießling (born 25 January 1984) is a German former professional footballer who played as a striker for Bayer Leverkusen and 1. FC Nürnberg. Born in Lichtenfels, West Germany, Kießling began playing football at a young age in the youth setup at 1. FC Eintracht Bamberg before moving to the 1. FC Nürnberg academy in 2001. He made his professional debut for Nürnberg as a 19-year-old in 2003 before being sold to Bayer Leverkusen in the summer of 2006. He stayed at Leverkusen for 12 seasons.

A German international from 2007 to 2010, Kießling earned six caps, failing to score a goal at the senior level. He represented Germany at the 2010 World Cup in South Africa, featuring in two matches for the eventual third-place side.

== Personal life ==
Kießling's grandfather founded Upper Franconian club TSV Eintracht Bamberg, which merged with 1. FC Bamberg in 2006 to form FC Eintracht Bamberg, and his father played as a goalkeeper. At 15, he had to make the choice between training as a chef or becoming a professional footballer. And although he stated that "cooking is still a lot of fun," it was football that ultimately prevailed. He also has a love for music, stating that his favorite artists are Bon Jovi and Bryan Adams.

Kießling and his wife Norina were married on 29 December 2008 in a civil ceremony at the Villa Römer in Opladen. The couple has two children, Hailey-Milu and Tayler-Joel.

== Club career ==
=== 1. FC Nürnberg ===
Kießling started his senior club career with Nürnberg having made his way through their youth ranks – though he was previously in 1. FC Eintracht Bamberg's youth academy.

In 2002, he signed a six-year contract with the club, after scoring 13 goals in 21 matches for the reserve side. He made his professional debut for Nürnberg in a 4–0 loss to Hamburger SV in April 2003. This ended up being the only appearance for the first team during the 2002–03 season. He scored his first professional goal in a 2–2 draw with Greuther Fürth on 7 March 2004. He finished the 2003–04 season with two goals in 14 matches. He went on to score four goals in 29 matches during the 2004–05 season and 11 goals in 33 appearances during the 2005–06 season.

=== Bayer Leverkusen ===
==== 2006–12 ====
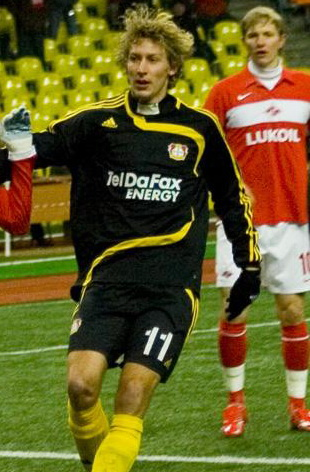
Kießling with Leverkusen in 2007

The young talent drew the attention of Arsenal and Bayern Munich, but he opted for Bayer Leverkusen in the summer of 2006 and signed a four-year contract until 30 June 2010, with Leverkusen paying €6.5 million for his signature. On 12 August 2006, Kießling made his first appearance for the new club, coming on as a substitute.

After arriving in Leverkusen, he netted eight goals in the 2006–07 season, 16 goals in the 2007–08 season, and 14 goals in the 2008–09 season. On 5 April 2009, he scored his side's first goal in a 2–0 win over 1. FC Köln, keeping alive Leverkusen's chances of qualifying for Europe for the following season. Leverkusen trailed off following the win, eventually falling to ninth place in the final Bundesliga standings.

In August 2009, he was voted as Bundesliga Player of the Month. He then scored a hat-trick for Bayer Leverkusen against Stuttgart on 29 November 2009, sending the club to the top of league table with a 4–0 win, three points clear of closest challengers Werder Bremen. On 16 March 2010, Kießling signed a contract extension with Leverkusen, tying him to the BayArena side until 2015. He continued his impressive form in the 2009–10 season, scoring 21 goals in 33 games and finishing the season as the second highest goal scorer in the Bundesliga after Edin Džeko, with 22. He was also included in the Bundesliga Team of the Season. Kießling finished the 2010–11 season with nine goal in 29 matches.

On 18 February 2012, Kießling scored two goals on only three shots and also provided an assist for André Schürrle as Leverkusen defeated FC Augsburg 4–1. On 5 May, he scored a hat-trick on the final day of the Bundesliga season, helping his side to a 4–1 win over former club Nürnberg and securing fifth place in the final league standings. Kießling finished the 2011–12 season with 17 goals in 43 matches.

==== 2012–13 season ====
Kießling's first goal of the season came in Leverkusen's opening match of the Bundesliga campaign on 25 August 2012, netting the opener as his side fell to a 2–1 defeat to Eintracht Frankfurt. He scored his only goal of Leverkusen's Europa League campaign on 4 October, coming on as a substitute and scoring the winning goal away to Norwegian side Rosenborg BK. On 15 December, Kießling scored a brace to keep Bayer close on the heels of Bayern Munich heading into the winter break; the goals also meant that at mid-season he was the top scorer in the Bundesliga. In PowerTable Sports Bundesliga XI of the Season, created at the mid-way point of the campaign, Kießling was the only striker included in a 4–2–3–1 formation.

Kießling continued to show consistently good form during the second half of the season and scored seven goals in the final six Bundesliga matches, including a brace against Hoffenheim on 20 April 2013 and game-winning goals against Werder Bremen on 27 April and Hannover 96 on 11 May. He was ultimately crowned the Bundesliga's highest scoring player for the 2012–13 season (having netted 25 goals in total, edging out Robert Lewandowski who finished with 24 goals). This personal record was secured with a goal on the final day of the Bundesliga season against Hamburg; scoring from a Sidney Sam pass in the final minute to secure a 1–0 win and third place in the Bundesliga.

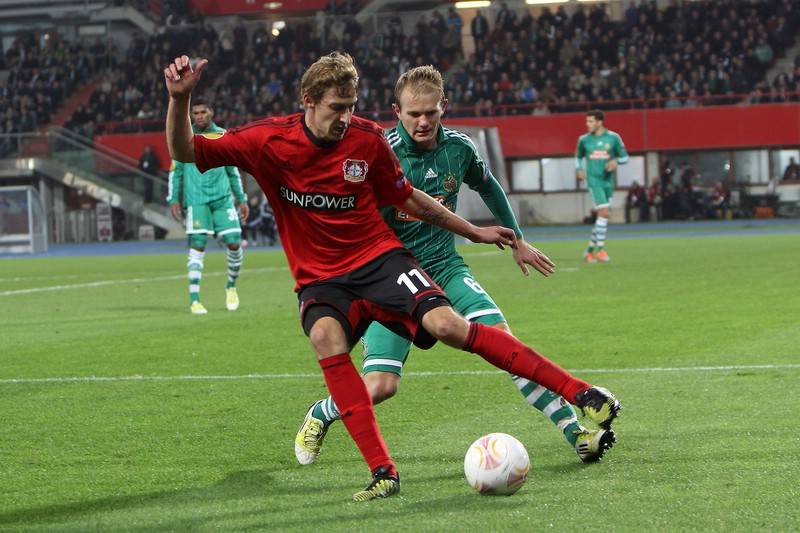
Kießling in action against Rapid Wien in the Europa League in October 2012

With his 25 goals, he contributed to 38% of Leverkusen's total goal output for the year. The 29-year-old also led the Bundesliga with shots taken on goal per game (3.6 on average). He also recorded seven assists, which was tied for the club lead at Leverkusen. Kießling also led the Bundesliga in aerial duels per match (5.4) – thanks to his height of 1.91 metres (6 ft 3 in) – and also led the league in fouls committed per match (2.6). He was also a scoring threat inside the box, scoring 24 of his 25 inside the area. He was included in the Bundesliga Team of the Season and was voted as the league's fourth best player overall. He finished the season with 27 goals in 43 matches in all competition.

==== 2013–14 season ====
On 26 July 2013, Kießling signed a contract extension with Leverkusen, committing himself to the club until 2017. His first goals of the 2013–14 season came in the first round of the DFB-Pokal on 3 August 2013, scoring in both halves as Leverkusen defeated Regionalliga side SV Lippstadt 08 6–1. In the first match of the Bundesliga campaign, Kießling scored his side's opener in a 3–1 defeat of Freiburg. On 14 September, he scored twice in the second half to give Leverkusen a 3–1 win over 10-man Wolfsburg. With his strong start to the season along with Sidney Sam and Son Heung-min, the trio were compared to the Stuttgart's Magic Triangle of the mid-1990s, consisting of players Krasimir Balakov, Fredi Bobic and Giovane Élber, who were known for terrorizing Bundesliga defenses and scoring many goals.

On 18 October, he was involved in an incident against Hoffenheim when he appeared to have missed the target with a header attempt off a corner. He turned away in frustration only to have his teammates come celebrate with him seconds later as the referee signaled the goal. Upon further review, the ball had gone wide of the post but ended up in the back of the net after squeezing through a hole in the side netting, unnoticed by most at the time. The "ghost goal" secured a 2–1 victory for Leverkusen and was cause for much debate after the game with Hoffenheim officials calling for a replay. Kießling shrugged off the debate five days later by scoring two convincing goals in Leverkusen's 4–0 hammering of Shakhtar Donetsk in the Champions League.

On 13 April 2014, Kießling scored a header after forty seconds to put his side 1–0 up over Hertha BSC; the game would finish 2–1 in Leverkusen's favor, moving the club into fourth place. On 10 May, Leverkusen defeated Werder Bremen 2–1, securing fourth place for the club and booking a spot in the play-off round of the UEFA Champions League for the following season. Kießling finished the season with 19 goals in 43 matches. Despite finishing the Bundesliga season as the leading goalscorer for a German forward, he was left out of the Germany squad at the World Cup in Brazil.

==== 2014–15 season ====
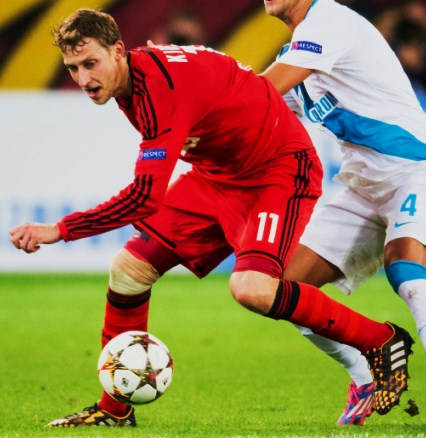
Kießling during a UEFA Champions League match against Zenit Saint Petersburg in 2014

In Leverkusen's first game of the 2014–15 season against SV Alemannia Waldalgesheim in the first round of the 2014–15 DFB-Pokal, Kießling scored five goals, including four in the first half, as Leverkusen won 6–0 against the Verbandsliga Südwest side. In the first leg of Leverkusen's Champions League play-off tie with Danish side Copenhagen, Kießling scored the German's opening goal of a 3–2 away win. In the first game of the Bundesliga season, he converted a Karim Bellarabi pass in the last minute of stoppage time to complete a 2–0 win over Borussia Dortmund. In the second leg of their Champions League play-off against Copenhagen, Kießling scored twice more as Leverkusen advanced to the group stages with a 7–2 aggregate victory. He scored his tenth goal of the season and earned his side a penalty in their second group match of the Champions League, a 3–1 home win over Benfica on 1 October. He finished the season with 19 goals in 48 matches.

==== 2015–16 season ====
In the first match in the Bundesliga season against Hoffenheim, Kießling set up a record: in every first game of the earlier four Bundesliga seasons he scored one goal. Only Klaas-Jan Huntelaar was also able to score the same number of goals.

On 12 December 2015, Kießling scored a brace and assisted two out of three of Javier Hernández's first hat-trick goals for Bayer Leverkusen at club level. On 19 April 2016, Kießling renewed his contract through June 2018. He finished the season with seven goals in 43 matches.

==== 2016–17 season ====
Prior to the 2016–17 season, Kießling stated that he might have to retire due to a "persistent hip injury". He finished the 2016–17 season with four goals in 20 league match, no goals in one German Cup match, and no goals in three European matches.

==== 2017–18 season ====
Kießling started the 2017–18 season by coming on as a substitute in the 77th minute in a 2–2 draw against 1899 Hoffenheim on matchday two. He completed his last professional game on 12 May 2018 (34th match day) in a 3–2 victory against Hannover 96 when he came on as a substitute in the 83rd minute for Lars Bender. He finished the 2017–18 season with eight appearances and 343 Bundesliga appearances in his Bayer Leverkusen career.

== International career ==
Kießling made his international debut for the Germany national team in a friendly against Denmark on 28 March 2007. Almost a year after earning his previous cap, he was recalled to the team by Joachim Löw after showing good form in the 2009–10 season, and subsequently picked up his fourth cap on 13 May 2010, in a friendly vs. Malta, playing the full ninety minutes in a 3–0 win. He was one of the 23 players making up the Germany squad for the 2010 FIFA World Cup. He came on as a substitute in two games, the knockout game with England, replacing Mesut Özil in the 83rd minute and during the "consolation" match for third place against Uruguay, where he came on as a substitute for Cacau in the 73rd minute.

He later stated that he would refuse call-ups to the squad while Joachim Löw remained in charge, due to a perceived lack of respect by the German coach. With Mario Gómez and Miroslav Klose both injured, Max Kruse was nominated instead of Kießling for the decisive 2014 World Cup qualifying match against Ireland, a move that essentially ruled Kießling out as an option for the German squad for the time being, despite his continued good form during the 2013–14 season.

== Style of play ==
Kießling was a typical target man, known for his work ethic and his eye for goal. He was praised for his evolution during his time in Leverkusen into a high quality striker, and one of the best in the Bundesliga. He was complimented for his ability to win aerial duels and earning free kicks. At the mid-way point of the 2012–13 season, Kießling averaged 5.6 aerial duals won per game, the most of any player in the Bundesliga. Many of Kießling's goals were from inside the penalty area and he was noted for getting plenty of goals as poacher – off deflections with his feet or head. During the 2012–13 Bundesliga season, 24 of his 25 league goals came from inside the area.

== Post-retirement ==
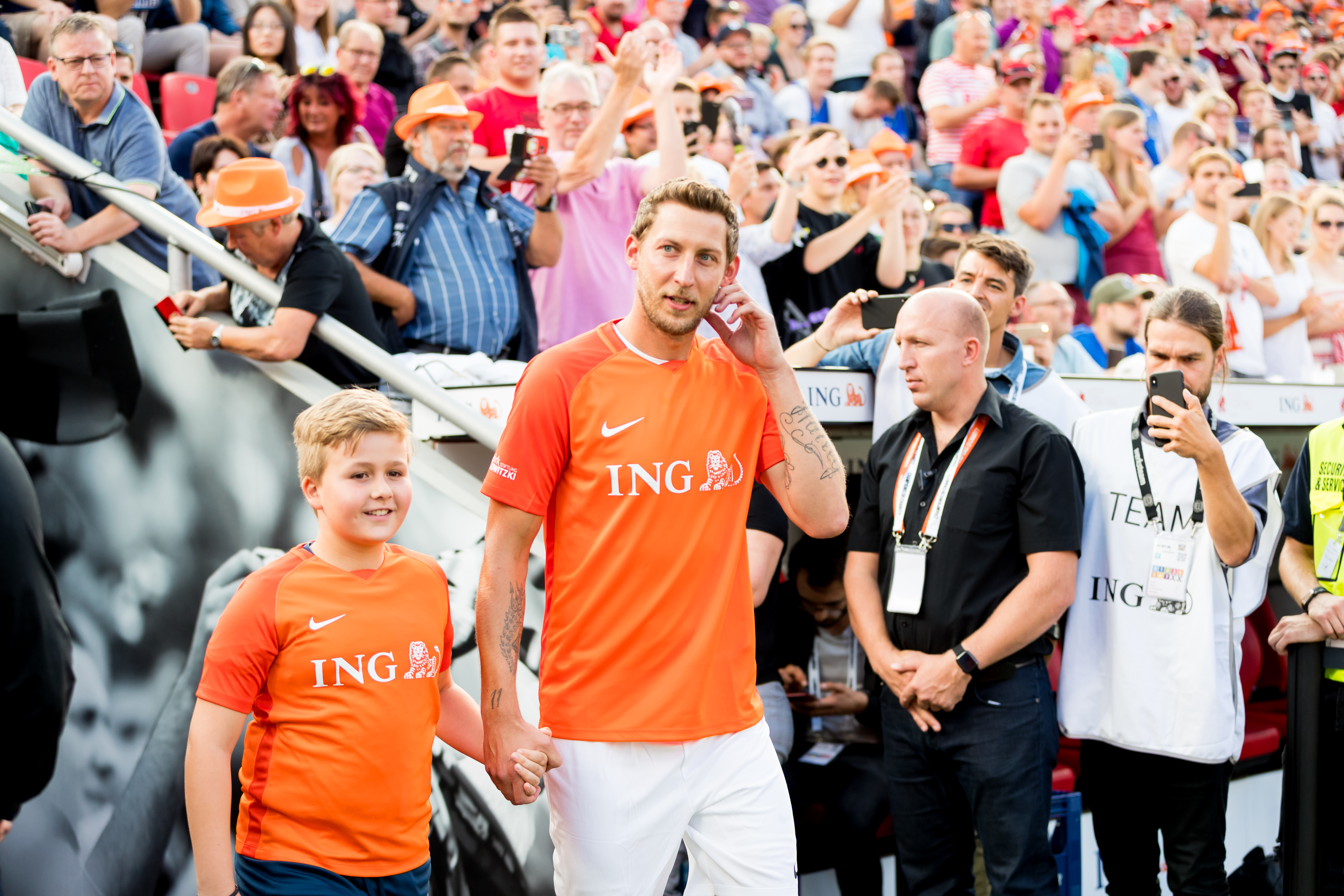
Kießling in a charity match in 2019

Kießling retired after the 2017–18 season. After the end of his playing career, he took up work in the administrative sector of Bayer Leverkusen. In December 2018, Kießling admitted that his wife completed some of his summer training sessions for him.

== Career statistics ==
=== Club ===
Appearances and goals by club, season and competition
Club	Season	League			DFB-Pokal		Europe		Other		Total	
Club	Season	League	Apps	Goals	Apps	Goals	Apps	Goals	Apps	Goals	Apps	Goals
Nürnberg	2002–03	Bundesliga	1	0	0	0	—		—		1	0
Nürnberg	2003–04	2. Bundesliga	14	2	0	0	—		—		14	2
Nürnberg	2004–05	Bundesliga	27	3	2	1	—		—		29	4
Nürnberg	2005–06	Bundesliga	31	10	2	1	—		—		33	11
Nürnberg	Total		73	15	4	2	0	0	0	0	77	17
Bayer Leverkusen	2006–07	Bundesliga	32	8	1	0	10 (Note: Appearances in UEFA Cup)	0	1 (Note: Appearance in DFB-Ligapokal)	0	44	8
Bayer Leverkusen	2007–08	Bundesliga	31	9	1	0	12	7	—		44	16
Bayer Leverkusen	2008–09	Bundesliga	34	12	6	2	—		—		40	14
Bayer Leverkusen	2009–10	Bundesliga	33	21	2	0	—		—		35	21
Bayer Leverkusen	2010–11	Bundesliga	22	7	1	2	6 (Note: Appearances in UEFA Europa League)	0	—		29	9
Bayer Leverkusen	2011–12	Bundesliga	34	16	1	0	8 (Note: Appearances in UEFA Champions League)	1	—		43	17
Bayer Leverkusen	2012–13	Bundesliga	34	25	3	1	6	1	—		43	27
Bayer Leverkusen	2013–14	Bundesliga	32	15	4	2	7	2	—		43	19
Bayer Leverkusen	2014–15	Bundesliga	34	9	4	6	10	4	—		48	19
Bayer Leverkusen	2015–16	Bundesliga	30	5	4	3	9	0	—		43	7
Bayer Leverkusen	2016–17	Bundesliga	20	4	1	0	3	0	—		24	4
Bayer Leverkusen	2017–18	Bundesliga	8	0	0	0	—		—		8	0
Bayer Leverkusen	Total		344	131	28	16	71	15	1	0	444	162
Career total			417	146	32	18	71	15	1	0	521	179

=== International ===
Appearances and goals by national team and year
National team	Year	Apps	Goals
Germany	2007	1	0
Germany	2009	2	0
Germany	2010	3	0
Total		6	0

== Honours ==
1. FC Nürnberg

- 2. Bundesliga: 2003–04

Bayer Leverkusen

- DFB-Pokal runner-up: 2008–09

Germany

- FIFA World Cup third place: 2010

Individual

- Bundesliga Player of the Month: August 2009
- Bundesliga Team of the Season: 2009–10
- Bundesliga top scorer: 2012–13 (25 goals)
- DFB-Pokal top scorer: 2014–15 (6 goals)
- kicker Bundesliga Team of the Season: 2012–13
