= Tobias Rau =

German former professional footballer (born 1981)

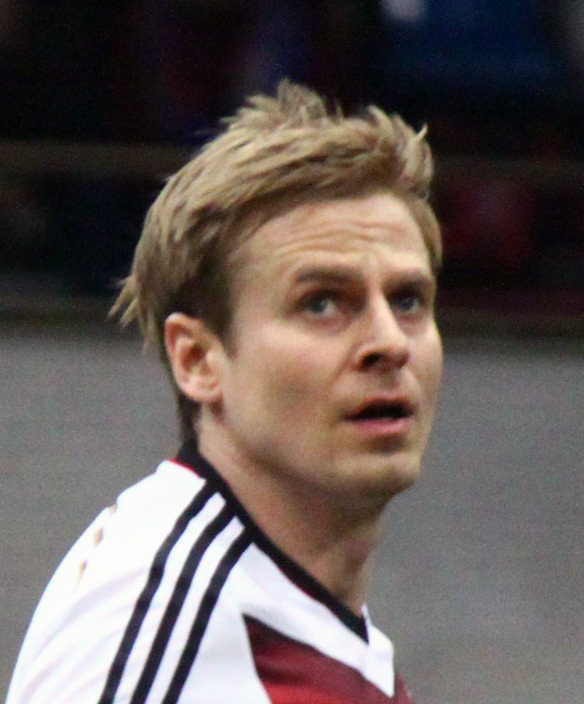
- Rau in 2015

Personal information
- Full name: Tobias Rau
- Date of birth: 31 December 1981 (age 44)
- Place of birth: Braunschweig, West Germany
- Height: 1.77 m (5 ft 10 in)
- Position: Left back

Youth career
- 1986–1996: Sportfreunde Ölper
- 1996–1999: Eintracht Braunschweig

Senior career*
Years	Team	Apps	(Gls)
1999–2001	Eintracht Braunschweig	60	(1)
2001–2003	VfL Wolfsburg	48	(1)
2003–2005	Bayern Munich	13	(0)
2005–2009	Arminia Bielefeld	32	(0)
Total		153	(2)

International career
2002	Germany U21	9	(1)
2003	Germany	7	(1)
2005	Germany Team 2006	1	(0)
- * Club domestic league appearances and goals

Tobias Rau (born 31 December 1981) is a German former professional footballer who played as a left back.

In a career blighted by injuries, he retired from professional play at only 27.

== Club career ==
=== Wolfsburg ===
Rau was born in Braunschweig, Lower Saxony. After making his professional debut at the third level of the German league pyramid with hometown club Eintracht Braunschweig, he moved to the professionals with VfL Wolfsburg.

Rau amassed 52 official appearances for the latter side. His Bundesliga debut came on 18 August 2001, starting and featuring 52 minutes in a 1–1 home draw against SC Freiburg.

=== Bayern Munich ===
In June 2003, Rau's solid performances caught the attention of powerhouse FC Bayern Munich. However, several serious injuries and stiff competition from Frenchmen Willy Sagnol and Bixente Lizarazu restricted his chances to 19 games across all competitions (with a further eight for the reserve team).

=== Arminia Bielefeld ===
In the summer of 2005, Rau signed with Arminia Bielefeld, where he would also be a backup and suffer severely with injuries – only an average of eight league matches in four years – being released on 30 June 2009 before announcing his retirement on 6 July.

== International career ==
Rau played seven times for Germany, all in 2003. His debut came on 12 February in a friendly with Spain played in Palma, Majorca, and his only goal contributed to a 4–1 home defeat of Canada on 1 June.

== Personal life ==
In July 2009, shortly after retiring, Rau announced his return to school to start a career as a teacher despite having offers from clubs abroad and from the 2. Bundesliga.

Rau returned to playing football in 2012, joining Kreisliga amateurs TV Neuenkirchen.

== Career statistics ==
Appearances and goals by club, season and competition
Club	Season	League			National Cup		Continental		Total	
Club	Season	Division	Apps	Goals	Apps	Goals	Apps	Goals	Apps	Goals
Eintracht Braunschweig	1999–2000	Regionalliga Nord	26	1	—		—		26	1
Eintracht Braunschweig	2000–01	Regionalliga Nord	34	0	—		—		34	0
Eintracht Braunschweig	Total		60	1	—		—		60	1
VfL Wolfsburg	2001–02	Bundesliga	22	1	1	0	—		23	1
VfL Wolfsburg	2002–03	Bundesliga	27	0	2	0	—		29	0
VfL Wolfsburg	Total		49	1	3	0	—		52	1
Bayern Munich	2003–04	Bundesliga	8	0	2	0	1 (Note: Appearance(s) in the UEFA Champions League)	0	11	0
Bayern Munich	2004–05	Bundesliga	5	0	1	0	2	0	8	0
Bayern Munich	Total		13	0	3	0	3	0	19	0
Bayern Munich II	2003–04	Regionalliga Süd	2	0	—		—		2	0
Bayern Munich II	2004–05	Regionalliga Süd	5	0	1	0	—		6	0
Bayern Munich II	Total		7	0	1	0	—		8	0
Arminia Bielefeld	2005–06	Bundesliga	14	0	2	0	—		16	0
Arminia Bielefeld	2006–07	Bundesliga	5	0	1	0	—		6	0
Arminia Bielefeld	2007–08	Bundesliga	10	0	2	0	—		12	0
Arminia Bielefeld	2008–09	Bundesliga	3	0	0	0	—		3	0
Arminia Bielefeld	Total		32	0	5	0	—		37	0
Arminia Bielefeld II	2006–07	Oberliga Westfalen	4	0	—		—		4	0
Arminia Bielefeld II	2007–08	Oberliga Westfalen	1	0	—		—		1	0
Arminia Bielefeld II	Total		5	0	—		—		5	0
Career Total			166	2	12	0	3	0	181	2
