= Stéphane Stassin =

Belgian footballer

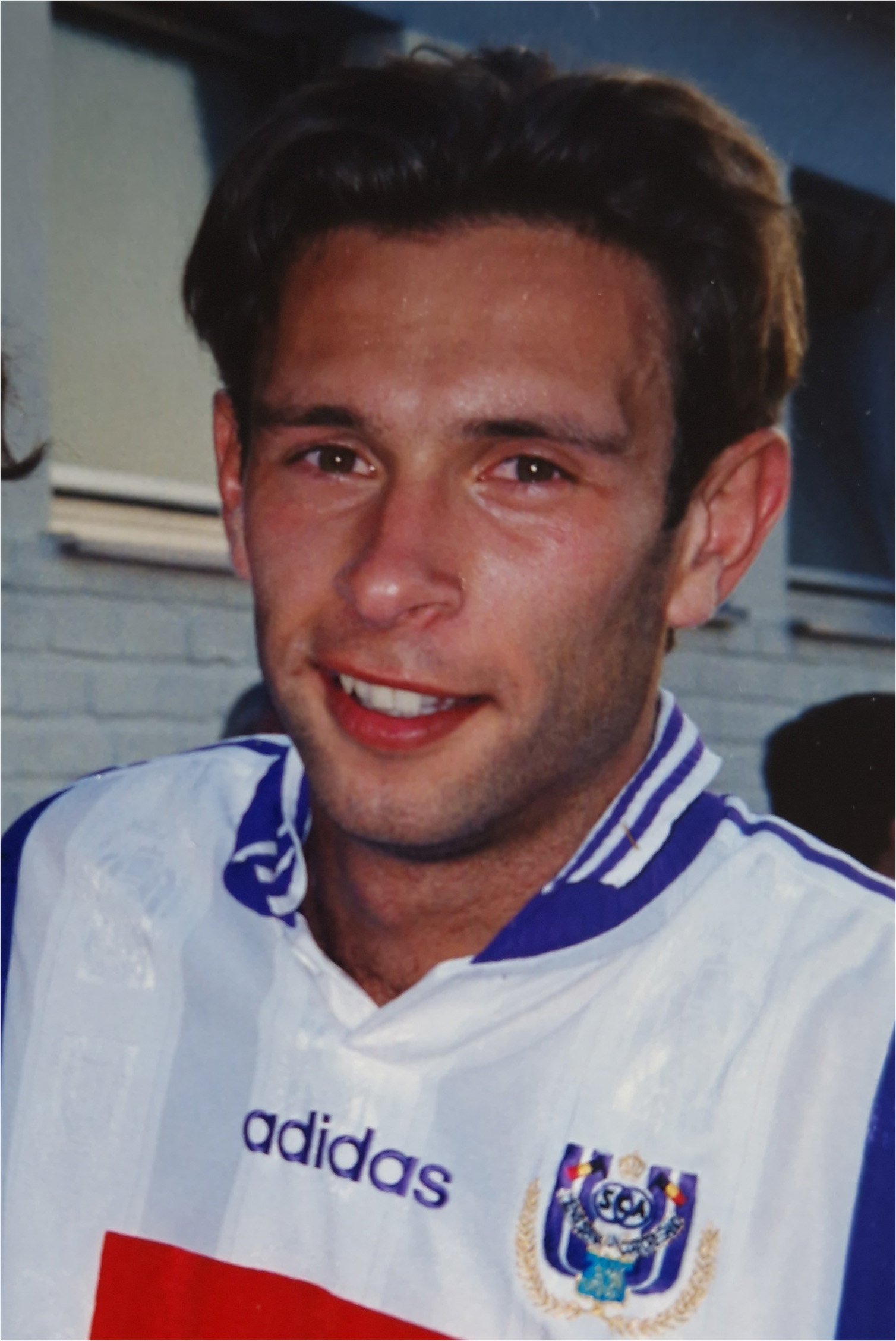
- Stassin with Anderlecht in 1997

Personal information
- Date of birth: 8 October 1976 (age 50)
- Place of birth: Braine-le-Comte, Belgium
- Height: 1.83 m (6 ft 0 in)
- Position: Midfielder

Team information
- Current team: Anderlecht (youth coach)

Youth career
- Stade Brainois
- Anderlecht

Senior career*
Years	Team	Apps	(Gls)
1996–2000	Anderlecht	43	(2)
2000–2003	Borussia Mönchengladbach	37	(1)
2004–2006	Angers	49	(2)
2006–2008	Union SG	56	(8)
2008–2010	Boussu Dour Borinage	50	(3)
2010–2011	ROCCM	3	(2)
2012–2013	Quevy-Mons		

Managerial career
- 2012–2013: Quevy-Mons (playing assistant)
- 2013–: Anderlecht (youth)
- * Club domestic league appearances and goals

Stéphane Stassin (born 8 October 1976) is a Belgian former professional footballer who played as a midfielder. He works as youth coach at Anderlecht.

== Career ==
While at Anderlecht, Stassin won the domestic title and played in the UEFA cup.

In 2000, Stassin joined Borussia Mönchengladbach. In 2001, he won promotion to the Bundesliga where he played for two seasons. With his contract running out at the end of the 2002–03 season, he suffered a severe knee injury during a friendly on 26 May 2003.
