= Milorad Popović =

Serbian footballer (1979–2006)

Personal information
- Full name: Milorad Popović
- Date of birth: 18 January 1979
- Place of birth: Ruma, SR Serbia, SFR Yugoslavia
- Date of death: 19 July 2006 (aged 27)
- Place of death: Ruma, Serbia
- Height: 1.85 m (6 ft 1 in)
- Position: Left-back

Senior career*
Years	Team	Apps	(Gls)
1997–1998	Sloven Ruma		
1998–2005	OFK Beograd	80	(5)
2002–2003	→ 1. FC Nürnberg (loan)	23	(0)
2003–2004	→ Karlsruher SC (loan)	16	(1)
Total		119	(6)

International career
2001	FR Yugoslavia U21	4	(0)
- * Club domestic league appearances and goals

Milorad Popović (Serbian Cyrillic: Милорад Поповић; 18 January 1979 – 19 July 2006) was a Serbian professional footballer who played as a defender.

== Club career ==
After starting out at his hometown club Sloven Ruma, Popović was transferred to OFK Beograd in the summer of 1998. He also played two seasons in Germany for 1. FC Nürnberg and Karlsruher SC, before returning to OFK Beograd.

== International career ==
At international level, Popović represented FR Yugoslavia U21s, making four appearances during the 2002 UEFA European Under-21 Championship qualification.

== Death ==
Popović died of cancer on 19 July 2006 at the age of 27. He was survived by his wife and daughter.
