= Marco Villa (footballer) =

German footballer (born 1978)

Personal information
- Date of birth: 18 July 1978 (age 48)
- Place of birth: Düsseldorf, West Germany
- Height: 1.80 m (5 ft 11 in)
- Position: Striker

Youth career
- KFC Uerdingen 05

Senior career*
Years	Team	Apps	(Gls)
1996–1999	Borussia Mönchengladbach	24	(4)
1999–2000	SV Ried	22	(8)
2000–2001	Panathinaikos	3	(0)
2001–2003	1. FC Nürnberg	12	(0)
2003–2005	Arezzo	9	(0)
2005	SPAL	8	(0)
2005–2006	Val di Sangro	15	(2)
2006	Sant'Antonia Abate	6	(2)
2006–2008	Morro d'Oro	47	(7)
2008–2010	L'Aquila	52	(17)
2010–2012	San Nicolò	?	(18)

International career
	Germany U21	9	(1)
- * Club domestic league appearances and goals

Marco Villa (born 18 July 1978) is a German former professional footballer who played as a striker.

== Career ==
Villa was born in Düsseldorf. He spent five seasons in the Bundesliga with Borussia Mönchengladbach and 1. FC Nürnberg. He became the youngest player for Borussia Mönchengladbach history to score a league goal (on 6 September 1996 in a game against Hamburger SV when he was 18 years and 50 days old). His record as the club's youngest goalscorer was surpassed by Wael Mohya at the age of 17 years and 66 days on 6 March 2026.

== Personal life ==
Villa was the best friend of Robert Enke, the former German International.
