= Júnior (footballer, born 1977) =

Brazilian footballer

Personal information
- Full name: Carlos de Jésus Júnior
- Date of birth: 10 October 1977 (age 49)
- Place of birth: Humberto de Campos, Brazil
- Height: 1.73 m (5 ft 8 in)
- Position: Midfielder

Youth career
- K. Boom F.C.
- Sampaio Corrêa
- Eendracht Aalst

Senior career*
Years	Team	Apps	(Gls)
–1998	1. FC Kaiserslautern II		
1998–2000	1. FC Kaiserslautern	8	(0)
2000–2003	1. FC Nürnberg	41	(4)
2003	FC Kärnten	12	(0)
2004–2005	Wacker Burghausen	2	(0)
2005–2006	Wacker Burghausen II		
- * Club domestic league appearances and goals

José Carlos de Jésus Júnior or simply Júnior (born 10 October 1977) is a Brazilian former professional footballer who played as a midfielder. He spent three seasons in the Bundesliga with 1. FC Kaiserslautern and 1. FC Nürnberg.
