= Rade Todorović =

Serbian footballer

Personal information
- Full name: Rade Todorović
- Date of birth: 21 May 1974 (age 52)
- Place of birth: Kraljevo, SFR Yugoslavia
- Height: 1.76 m (5 ft 9 in)
- Position: Right midfielder

Senior career*
Years	Team	Apps	(Gls)
1993–1996	Sloga Kraljevo		
1996–1999	OFK Beograd		
1999–2000	Sutjeska Nikšić		(1)
2000–2002	Slavia Sofia	41	(2)
2002–2003	FC Nürnberg	7	(0)
2003–2004	Napredak Kruševac		
2004–2005	Kryvbas Kryvyi Rih	4	(0)
2005–2006	Amur Blagoveshchensk	28	(0)
2006–2008	Sloga Kraljevo	36	(4)
- * Club domestic league appearances and goals

Rade Todorović (Serbian Cyrillic: Раде Тодоровић; born 21 May 1974) is a Serbian former footballer who played as a right midfielder.

== Career ==
Todorović was born in Kraljevo.

He spent one season in the Bundesliga with 1. FC Nürnberg.

Some other clubs he has played for are FK Sloga Kraljevo, OFK Beograd, FK Sutjeska Nikšić, PFC Slavia Sofia, FK Napredak Kruševac, FC Kryvbas Kryvyi Rih and FC Amur Blagoveshchensk.

A youth football tournament held in Kraljevo on 19 January 2009 was named "Balon Todorović" in his honour.
