= Tommy Svindal Larsen =

Norwegian footballer (born 1973)

Tommy Larsen
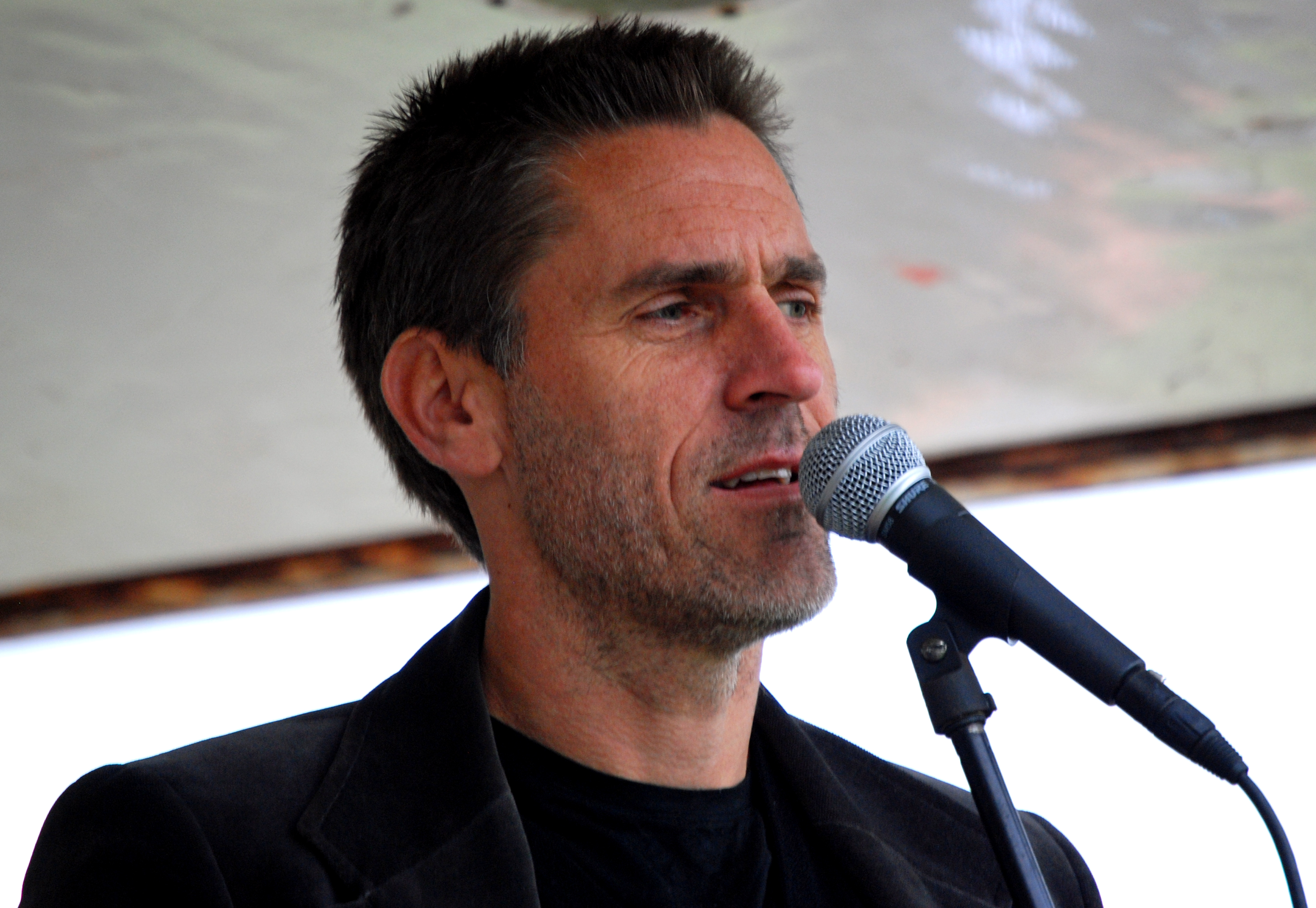

Personal information
- Full name: Tommy Svindal Larsen
- Date of birth: 11 August 1973 (age 53)
- Place of birth: Skien, Norway
- Height: 1.74 m (5 ft 9 in)
- Position: Defensive midfielder

Senior career*
Years	Team	Apps	(Gls)
1988–1990	Odd	34	(9)
1991	Start	16	(1)
1992	→ Odd (loan)	23	(5)
1993–1994	Start	43	(1)
1995–2001	Stabæk	153	(16)
2001–2005	1. FC Nürnberg	109	(2)
2005–2011	Odd	139	(3)
Total		517	(37)

International career
1988–1989	Norway U15	25	(8)
1989	Norway U16	12	(8)
1990–1991	Norway U17	11	(4)
1992	Norway U18	6	(0)
1993	Norway U20	4	(0)
1991–1995	Norway U21	41	(11)
1996–2007	Norway	24	(0)
- * Club domestic league appearances and goals

Tommy Svindal Larsen, born 11 August 1973, is a Norwegian former professional footballer. He primarily played as a defensive midfielder for Odd, Start and Stabæk in his home country, along with a four-year stint at 1. FC Nürnberg in Germany. Svindal Larsen represented Norway internationally, earning 24 caps.

== Club career ==
Svindal Larsen, born in Skien, was recognized as an exceptionally talented player during his youth. He made his senior debut for Odd in the First Division at the age of 15. By 17, he was signed by Start for the 1991 season. Despite regular appearances for the Kristiansand club, he was overshadowed by other players and left Start after the 1994 season, having only briefly demonstrated his potential. He then joined newly promoted Stabæk.

At Stabæk, Svindal Larsen became a first-team regular. Initially known as a creative attacking midfielder, he transitioned into more of a midfield anchor role and excelled in it. Teaming up with Martin Andresen, he formed a formidable midfield partnership. In 1998, he captained Stabæk to victory in the Norwegian Cup, securing his first major trophy.

After six years at Stabæk, Svindal Larsen sought opportunities abroad and joined German side 1. FC Nürnberg on a Bosman free transfer at the end of the 2001 season. He spent four years with the Bundesliga club, making over a hundred appearances. Svindal Larden then returned home to his first club, Odd, where he concluded his career. He captained his hometown team for six seasons before retiring in 2011.

== International career ==
Svindal Larsen was capped by Norway at every youth level from Under-15 to Under-21, and is current record holder for most total international games played for Norway's age-delimited national teams, with 99 youth caps in total, including a record 41 caps for Norway Under-21.

However, despite his success at youth level, Svindal Larsen never truly made his mark in senior international football. He had to wait until April 1996, a few months before his 23rd birthday, before he got his full international debut in a friendly against Spain, and did not start an international match until a January 1999 friendly against Israel. In total, Svindal Larsen was capped 24 times by the Norway senior national team, and ten of those appearances was as a substitute. Tired of being selected for the international squad only to sit on the bench, Svindal Larsen announced his retirement from international football in 2007.

== Personal life ==
Svindal Larsen is married and has four children.

== Championship Manager ==
Svindal Larsen came to be known as a bargain signing in the computer game Championship Manager. In 2008, the sports writer Rob Smyth noted how bargain signings could be picked up from Scandinavian clubs and that: "The pick of those bargains, for many, was Tommy Svindal Larsen, an absolute beast in the 1997-98 version who could be poached from Stabaek for a few coppers and a Werthers Original".

== Career statistics ==
Appearances and goals by club, season and competition:Source:
Season	Club	League			Cup		Total	
Season	Club	Division	Apps	Goals	Apps	Goals	Apps	Goals
1. FC Nürnberg	2001–02	Bundesliga	21	1	0	0	21	1
1. FC Nürnberg	2002–03	Bundesliga	30	0	3	0	33	0
1. FC Nürnberg	2003–04	2. Bundesliga	29	1	2	0	31	1
1. FC Nürnberg	2004–05	Bundesliga	29	0	1	0	30	0
Odd Grenland	2005	Tippeligaen	11	1	1	0	12	1
Odd Grenland	2006	Tippeligaen	23	1	1	0	24	1
Odd Grenland	2007	Tippeligaen	19	0	3	0	22	0
Odd Grenland	2008	Adeccoligaen	27	1	2	1	29	2
Odd Grenland	2009	Tippeligaen	22	0	4	0	26	0
Odd Grenland	2010	Tippeligaen	15	0	3	0	18	0
Odd Grenland	2011	Tippeligaen	22	0	4	0	26	0
Career total			248	5	24	1	272	6
