= Darius Kampa =

German footballer

Personal information
- Date of birth: 16 January 1977 (age 49)
- Place of birth: Kędzierzyn-Koźle, Poland
- Height: 1.85 m (6 ft 1 in)
- Position: Goalkeeper

Youth career
- –1987: OSiR Racibórz
- 1987–1995: FC Augsburg

Senior career*
Years	Team	Apps	(Gls)
1995–1998	FC Augsburg	58	(0)
1998–2004	1. FC Nürnberg	84	(0)
2004–2006	Borussia Mönchengladbach	17	(0)
2006	Zalaegerszegi TE	9	(0)
2007	Sturm Graz	0	(0)
2007–2011	SpVgg Unterhaching	143	(0)
Total		311	(0)

International career
1997–1999	Germany U-21	3	(0)
1998	Germany Olympic	2	(0)
- * Club domestic league appearances and goals

Darius Kampa (Polish: Dariusz Kampa; born 16 January 1977 in Kędzierzyn-Koźle, Silesia, Poland) is a German former footballer who played as a goalkeeper. He also holds Polish citizenship. He spent five seasons in the Bundesliga with 1. FC Nürnberg and Borussia Mönchengladbach.

== Career statistics ==
Appearances and goals by club, season and competition
Club	Season	League			Cup		Total	
Club	Season	Division	Apps	Goals	Apps	Goals	Apps	Goals
FC Augsburg	1994–95	Regionalliga Süd	2	0	—		2	0
FC Augsburg	1995–96	Regionalliga Süd	0	0	—		26	0
FC Augsburg	1996–97	Regionalliga Süd	26	0	—		26	0
FC Augsburg	1997–98	Regionalliga Süd	31	0	—		31	0
FC Augsburg	Total		58	0	—		58	0
1. FC Nürnberg	1998–99	Bundesliga	1	0	1	0	2	0
1. FC Nürnberg	1999–2000	2. Bundesliga	5	0	0	0	5	0
1. FC Nürnberg	2000–01	2. Bundesliga	10	0	1	0	11	0
1. FC Nürnberg	2001–02	Bundesliga	32	0	1	0	33	0
1. FC Nürnberg	2002–03	Bundesliga	34	0	2	0	36	0
1. FC Nürnberg	2003–04	2. Bundesliga	2	0	0	0	2	0
1. FC Nürnberg	Total		84	0	5	0	89	0
Borussia Mönchengladbach	2004–05	Bundesliga	16	0	1	0	17	0
Borussia Mönchengladbach	2005–06	Bundesliga	1	0	0	0	1	0
Borussia Mönchengladbach	Total		17	0	1	0	18	0
Zalaegerszegi TE	2006–07	Nemzeti Bajnokság I	9	0	0	0	9	0
Sturm Graz	2006–07	Austrian Bundesliga	0	0	—		0	0
SpVgg Unterhaching	2007–08	Regionalliga Süd	34	0	1	0	35	0
SpVgg Unterhaching	2008–09	3. Liga	38	0	1	0	39	0
SpVgg Unterhaching	2009–10	3. Liga	36	0	1	0	37	0
SpVgg Unterhaching	2010–11	3. Liga	35	0	0	0	35	0
SpVgg Unterhaching	Total		143	0	3	0	146	0
Career total			311	0	9	0	320	0
