= Andreas Wolf =

German footballer (born 1982)

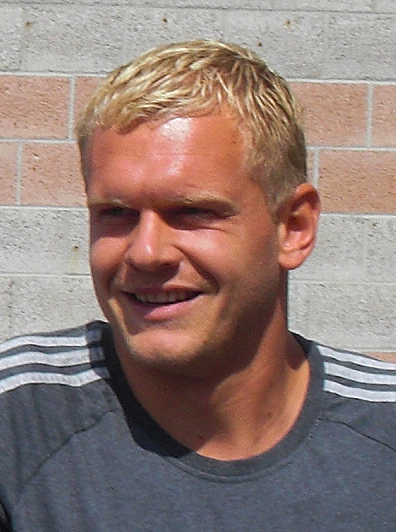
- Wolf during his time with 1. FC Nürnberg in 2009

Personal information
- Date of birth: 12 June 1982 (age 44)
- Place of birth: Leninabad, Tajik SSR, Soviet Union (now Khujand, Tajikistan)
- Height: 1.82 m (6 ft 0 in)
- Positions: Centre-back; right-back

Youth career
- SV Pfeil Burk
- –1992: ESV Ansbach-Eyb
- 1993–1996: SpVgg Ansbach
- 1996–2002: 1. FC Nürnberg II

Senior career*
Years	Team	Apps	(Gls)
2002–2011	1. FC Nürnberg	213	(7)
2011–2012	Werder Bremen	15	(0)
2012–2014	Monaco	24	(2)
Total		252	(9)
- * Club domestic league appearances and goals

Andreas Wolf (Cyrillic: Андрей Андреевич Вольф, romanized: Andrey Andreyevich Volf; born 12 June 1982) is a German former professional footballer who played as a defender. He spent nine seasons at 1. FC Nürnberg captaining the team for many years before leaving for Werder Bremen in the summer of 2011. In January 2012, he moved to AS Monaco where he played until summer 2014.

Following an end to his playing career, Wolf has since moved to coaching.

== Career ==
=== 1. FC Nürnberg ===
After moving to Germany with his parents in 1990 Wolf started playing football for several teams in the Ansbach area before joining 1. FC Nürnberg in 1997. There he played for several junior teams, before breaking into first team football in 2002 when he debuted in the Bundesliga against Hertha BSC on 23 March 2002, which saw Nürnberg lose 2–0. He went on to make three more appearances later in the 2001–02 season while Nürnberg finished in 15th place. Despite initially wanting to leave the club, Wolf eventually stayed at the club by signing his first professional contract, keeping him until 2004.

In the 2002–03 season, Wolf spent the start of the season away from the first team and played for the reserve side instead, also being sidelined due to an ankle injury. On 7 December 2002 he made his first appearance of the season, setting up one of the goals in a 2–2 draw against Energie Cottbus. Despite suffering another injury later in the season, Wolf returned to the first team, but was unable to help the club survive relegation in the 2002–03 season during which played in 18 games for the "Club".

In the 2003–04 season, Wolf became a first team regular during Nürnberg's successful promotion campaign, playing in 31 of 34 games. At the start of the season, he was involved in the first team for the first six matches until his sending off for a second bookable offence, in a 1–1 draw against Greuther Fürth on 22 September 2003. He remained in the first team with his performances earning him a new contract until 2006. He scored his first Nürnberg goal on 2 April 2004, in a 2–1 loss against Jahn Regensburg.

In the 2004–05 season, Wolf remained in the first team at the start of the season until he suffered a muscle injury that kept him out for two months. After making his return from injury in a 3–1 loss against VfL Bochum on 27 November 2004, he was sent off for a second bookable offence in the next game on 3 December 2004, a 2–2 draw against Bayern Munich. As the 2004–05 season progressed, Wolf suffered a shoulder injury that kept him out for the rest of the season. He finished the 2004–05 season making 18 appearances in all competitions.

In the 2005–06 season, Wolf recovered from injury and found himself competing over a centre–back position with Thomas Paulus and Bartosz Bosacki. After featuring in three matches since his return in September, he suffered an injury that kept him out for a month. Following his recovery from injury, he returned to the first team, but was plagued with another injury. Wolf again returned to the first team and finished the season making 22 appearances in all competitions. During the season, he signed a contract extension with the club, keeping him until 2009.

With the start of the 2006–07 season, Wolf was back in the starting line-up alongside fellow centre-back Gláuber. He started the season well and helped the club go undefeated in the first nine matches of the season before losing 2–1 against Hertha BSC on 4 November 2006, in which he was suspended after picking five yellow cards this season. Wolf's performance continued to impress, resulting him to sign a contract extension keeping him until 2011. He then scored his first goal of the season on 28 April 2007, in a 1–1 draw against VfL Wolfsburg. Although he missed out again due to a back injury he finished the 2006–07 season making 35 appearances in all competitions.

In the 2007–08 season, Wolf continued to be in the first team at the club and scored his first goal of the season on 1 September 2007, in a 1–1 draw against Energie Cottbus. His second goal came on 11 November 2007, in a 3–1 loss against Arminia Bielefeld. Nine days later, on 20 September 2007, Wolf made his European debut for the club, playing the whole game in a 0–0 draw against Rapid București in the first leg of UEFA Cup first round. He suffered injury setbacks in the first half of the season, and later in the 2007–08 season he was suspended twice. The season saw Nürnberg relegated back to 2. Bundesliga with Wolf making 30 appearances and scoring twice in all competitions.

In the 2008–09 season, Wolf stayed at the club amid speculations linking him to a transfer to La Liga side Racing Santander. Following this, he was appointed the new captain. In the opening game of the season, he scored his first goal of the season, but was substituted off having ruptured his anterior cruciate ligament in the 70th minute. After the match, it was announced that Wolf would be out for six months. He made his return to training in February and returned to the first team on 22 February 2009, starting and playing 74 minutes in a 1–0 win over Wehen Wiesbaden. He was given a handful of first appearances until he suffered a knee injury and was substituted as a result in the second half of a 2–0 win against TuS Koblenz on 3 April 2009. Following the match, it was announced that Wolf would be out for the rest of the season after undergoing an operation on his knee. He finished the 2008–09 season making eight appearances in all competitions. During his absence, the club was able to reach the Bundesliga for the next season.

In the 2009–10 season, Wolf returned to the first team from injury in the pre–season and retained his captaincy ahead of the new season. He was featured in the first team for the side at the start until he was suspended for two matches after being involved in an incident in a friendly match. His return from suspension against Bochum on 25 September 2009 was short–lived when he suffered an injury during the match. After spending weeks on the sidelines, Wolf returned to the first team on 17 October 2009, in a 3–0 win over Hertha BC. As the 2009–10 season progressed, Wolf remained in the first team for the rest of the season despite being absent twice and finished the season making 32 appearances in all competitions.

In the 2010–11 season, Wolf remained the club's captain this season and started the first five matches of the season until his sending off after a second bookable offence in a 2–1 win over VfB Stuttgart on 22 September 2010. After serving a one match suspension, he scored two goals in two matches against Schalke 04 and FC St. Pauli. He scored his third goal of the season in a 3 –1 win over Hannover 96 on 18 December 2010. Wolf continued to be in the first team as the 2010–11 season progressed while being suspended twice and finished the season making 34 appearances and scoring three times in all competitions.

During the 2010–11 season, Wolf's future at Nürnberg was in doubt after the contract negotiation between the two parties had stalled and by mid-May 2011 this had not changed.

At the end of May, Wolf announced that no agreement had been found.

=== Werder Bremen ===
On 3 July 2011, Wolf moved to Werder Bremen on a two-year contract, ending his fourteen years association with Nürnberg.

He made his Werder Bremen debut in the opening game of the season, starting and playing the full 90 minutes in a 2–0 win over Kaiserslautern. He suffered an injury in the next match, but was able to return to the next game against SC Freiburg on 20 August 2011. On 17 September 2011, he played in a 1–1 draw against his former club Nürnberg. In a 1–1 draw against FC Augsburg on 21 October 2011 he set up Claudio Pizarro to score the equaliser.

By January, Wolf made 15 appearances and announced his desire to leave the club citing injury concerns and personal reasons as the main factors. He had previously stated that he intended to finish his career at Werder Bremen.

=== Monaco ===
On 23 January 2012, Wolf signed a two-year contract with an option of extending for a further year with AS Monaco in the French Ligue 2 for an undisclosed fee.

After recovering from an injury sustained whilst at Werder Bremen he made his Monaco debut on 23 March 2012, starting and playing the full 90 minutes in a 2–1 win over Châteauroux. This was followed up against Le Mans on 30 March 2012. However, Wolf suffered an injury again when his face was fractured during the match sidelining him for the rest of the season.

After making two appearances for the club in the first half of the 2012–13 season, it was announced that Wolf was appointed new captain of Monaco, under the new manager Claudio Ranieri. His first game as captain came in the opening game of the season, where he started and played the whole match, in a 4–0 win over Tours. He scored his first goal for the club on 30 September 2012, in a 2–2 draw against Gazélec Ajaccio and his second goal for the club came on 10 November 2012, in a 2–2 draw against Auxerre. Despite being appointed captain, Wolf's first team playing time soon became limited due to new signings as well as his own injuries. While on the sidelines, he said he was treated as a "poor man" at the club. In his second season he made 32 appearances and scoring twice in all competitions.

In the 2013–14 season, Wolf had his captaincy replaced when the club signed Eric Abidal ahead of the new season. After no involvement in the first team in the first half of the season, he was on the verge of joining Dutch side Utrecht In January 2014, but the move was not completed and he stayed at the club for the rest of the season. He appeared as an unused substitute on 10 May 2014, in a 2–1 win over Valenciennes and made his first and last appearance of the season in the next match, the last of the season, coming on as a substitute in the second half of a 1–1 draw against Bordeaux.

After two years at Monaco, Wolf was released by the club.

== Post-football career ==
After leaving Monaco, Wolf retired from professional football and intended to take up coaching instead. Two month later, he returned to Germany, joining his former club Nürnberg as a coach to the junior team. In May 2016, he left the club when he and Roger Prinzen were replaced by Michael Köllner.

== Personal life ==
Born in Leninabad, Soviet Union, Wolf moved to Germany, along with his father, mother and sister. In June 2008, Wolf married his girlfriend Sandra. Together, the couple had a daughter, who was born in 2009.

In 2010, the supporters of 1. FC Nürnberg voted Wolf second behind Stefan Reuter as the club's greatest defenders of the century on the club's website.

== Career statistics ==
=== Club ===
Appearances and goals by club, season and competition
Club	Season	League			Cup		Continental		Total	
Club	Season	Division	Apps	Goals	Apps	Goals	Apps	Goals	Apps	Goals
1. FC Nürnberg	2001–02	Bundesliga	4	0	0	0	—		4	0
1. FC Nürnberg	2002–03	Bundesliga	14	0	0	0	—		14	0
1. FC Nürnberg	2003–04	2. Bundesliga	31	1	2	0	—		33	1
1. FC Nürnberg	2004–05	Bundesliga	16	0	2	0	—		18	0
1. FC Nürnberg	2005–06	Bundesliga	20	0	2	0	—		22	0
1. FC Nürnberg	2006–07	Bundesliga	32	1	5	0	—		37	1
1. FC Nürnberg	2007–08	Bundesliga	30	2	2	0	8	0	40	2
1. FC Nürnberg	2008–09	2. Bundesliga	7	0	1	0	—		8	0
1. FC Nürnberg	2009–10	Bundesliga	29	0	1	0	—		30	0
1. FC Nürnberg	2010–11	Bundesliga	30	3	4	0	—		34	3
1. FC Nürnberg	Total		213	7	19	0	8	0	240	7
Werder Bremen	2011–12	Bundesliga	15	0	1	0	—		16	0
Monaco	2011–12	Ligue 2	2	0	—		—		2	0
Monaco	2012–13	Ligue 2	21	2	1	0	—		22	2
Monaco	2013–14	Ligue 1	1	0	0	0	—		1	0
Monaco	Total		24	2	1	0	—		25	2
Career total			252	9	21	0	8	0	281	9

== Honours ==
Monaco

- Ligue 2: 2012–13

1. FC Nürnberg

- 2. Bundesliga: 2003–04
- DFB-Pokal: 2006–07
