= Stephan Paßlack =

German footballer

Personal information
- Date of birth: 24 August 1970 (age 56)
- Place of birth: Moers, West Germany
- Height: 1.86 m (6 ft 1 in)
- Position: Right-back

Youth career
- 1978–1981: TV Asberg
- 1981–1986: VfB Homberg
- 1986–1989: FC Bayer 05 Uerdingen

Senior career*
Years	Team	Apps	(Gls)
1989–1993	FC Bayer 05 Uerdingen	94	(10)
1993–1994	→ 1. FC Köln (loan)	18	(1)
1994	→ Eintracht Frankfurt (loan)	0	(0)
1994–1996	KFC Uerdingen 05	54	(12)
1996–1999	Borussia Mönchengladbach	67	(7)
1999–2001	1860 Munich	34	(1)
2001–2004	1. FC Nürnberg	39	(0)
2004–2005	KFC Uerdingen 05	16	(0)
Total		322	(31)

International career
1990–1992	Germany U21	11	(0)
	Germany B	1	(1)
1996–1998	Germany	4	(1)
- * Club domestic league appearances and goals

Stephan Paßlack (born 24 August 1970) is a German former professional footballer who played as a right-back. At international level, he represented Germany playing for the U21 team, the B team and the first team with whom he earned four caps scoring one goal.

== Career ==
Born in Moers, West Germany, Paßlack began his career as a youth player at local football club TV Asberg before eventually moving on to VfB Homberg where he played until 1986. He then went on to play for many more German clubs including 1. FC Köln, Eintracht Frankfurt and KFC Uerdingen 05 before gaining his first international cap in 1996 against Armenia while he was playing for Borussia Mönchengladbach. After staying with Mönchengladbach for three years, he left to play for 1860 Munich and then to 1. FC Nürnberg before finally ending his career in 2006 back with his old club KFC Uerdingen.

== Honours ==
- 2. Bundesliga North (II): 1991–92
- 2. Bundesliga (II): 2003–04
