= Marek Nikl =

Czech former international footballer (born 1976)

Personal information
- Full name: Marek Nikl
- Date of birth: 20 February 1976 (age 50)
- Place of birth: Nymburk, Czechoslovakia
- Height: 1.82 m (6 ft 0 in)
- Position: Centre back

Team information
- Current team: Vysočina Jihlava (manager)

Youth career
- 1984–1994: Bohemians Prague

Senior career*
Years	Team	Apps	(Gls)
1994–1995	Sparta Krč		
1995–1998	Bohemians 1905	87	(19)
1998–2007	1. FC Nürnberg	228	(16)
2007–2012	Bohemians 1905	94	(1)

International career
1999–2000	Czech Republic	5	(0)

Managerial career
- 2017–2020: Příbram (assistant)
- 2021: Benešov
- 2021–2022: Příbram (assistant)
- 2022–2023: České Budějovice
- 2024–2025: Viktoria Žižkov
- 2025–2026: Dukla Prague (assistant)
- 2026–: Vysočina Jihlava
- * Club domestic league appearances and goals

Marek Nikl (born 20 February 1976) is a Czech former professional footballer who played as a centre back, most notably for 1. FC Nürnberg. He made five appearances for the Czech Republic national team.

== Career ==
Nikl spent most of his early footballing years with Prague-based club Bohemians – with a short spell at Sparta Krč in the 1994–95 season – before joining then newly promoted Bundesliga side 1. FC Nürnberg in November 1998 for the remainder of the 1998–99 season. He played in all 22 games after his arrival in Franconia but could not prevent the side going down despite scoring his first goal for the Club in the final game of the season. This game saw Nürnberg dropping from a secure 12th spot going into the match to being relegated on scored goals as 16th of the league at the end of the match.

Nikl stayed with the team and was a cornerstone in the following two seasons. Nürnberg were promoted again at the end of the 2000–01 season and successfully staved off relegation in the following season, with the Czech defender again playing a vital role in doing so. However, the team could not accomplish the feat a second time and were relegated again at the end of the 2002–03 season. Nikl still played in most of the games for the team and was well established within the team's hierarchy. He chose not to leave the club and stayed on to help the team get promoted for a third time during his spell at Nürnberg.

Once more, Nikl proved a valuable asset during the successful promotion campaign the following season missing merely six of thirty-four games. Nürnberg stayed up the next year and Nikl played in 25 matches, twice missing three matches in a row due to injuries. With the beginning of the 2005–06 season, Nikl seemed to fall out of coach Wolfgang Wolf's favor playing just five of the eleven games until Wolf's dismissal. With the arrival of new coach Hans Meyer, Nikl was back in the starting line-up playing all of the remaining twenty-two matches stabilising Nürnberg's defence in the process.

Troubled by minor injuries and problems with his stamina, Nikl was forced to sit out the start of the following 2006–07 season coming on in only seven games. Nevertheless, he was part of the squad that won the national cup in May 2007.

In the following season, Nikl played several matches for the second team squad in the German fourth division. Because of the unsatisfying situation he left the FCN in September 2007 and again joined Bohemians 1905 Prague.

He was capped five times for the Czech Republic national team and all of these caps were gained while playing at Nürnberg. His debut was against Poland on 28 April 1999, his last game thus far came against Slovenia in August 2000.

== Honours ==
1. FC Nürnberg

- DFB-Pokal: 2006–07
