= Saša Ćirić =

Macedonian footballer (born 1968)

Personal information
- Full name: Saša Ćirić
- Date of birth: 11 January 1968 (age 58)
- Place of birth: Kumanovo, Yugoslavia
- Height: 1.83 m (6 ft 0 in)
- Position: Striker

Youth career
- –1987: FK Sloga Umin Dol

Senior career*
Years	Team	Apps	(Gls)
1987–1989	Metalurg Skopje		
1989–1991	FK Pelister	58	(23)
1991–1993	FK Vardar	60	(52)
1993	CSKA Sofia	14	(8)
1994–1995	FK Vardar	30	(35)
1995–1997	FC Aarau	73	(30)
1998–1999	1. FC Nürnberg	45	(22)
1999–2000	Tennis Borussia Berlin	32	(14)
2000–2002	Eintracht Frankfurt	25	(11)
2002–2004	1. FC Nürnberg	47	(21)
2004–2006	Kickers Offenbach	32	(12)
Total		416	(228)

International career
1995–2004	Macedonia	26	(8)
- * Club domestic league appearances and goals

Saša Ćirić or Saša Ḱiriḱ (Macedonian: Сашa Ќириќ; born 11 January 1968) is a retired Macedonian football player.

== Club career ==
Ćirić started his career at Sloga Umin Dol. Via Metalurg Skopje he moved to Pelister. From the Bulgarian side CSKA Sofia (for which he played in 1994) he signed for FK Vardar again and went to FC Aarau. German Bundesliga side 1. FC Nürnberg bought him in 1997 for a fee of one million Swiss francs.

In 1999, Tennis Borussia Berlin signed him for four million Marks. Although Ćirić wanted to stay Nürnberg had to sell him after being relegated for financial reasons. In 2000, he signed at Eintracht Frankfurt.

In 2003, Ćirić joined The Club once again and retired in 2006 at Offenbacher Kickers.

== International career ==
He made his senior debut for Macedonia in an April 1995 friendly match against Bulgaria and has earned a total of 26 caps, scoring 8 goals. His final international was an April 2004 friendly match against Croatia.

== Personal life ==
After retiring as a player, he became chairman of Macedonian second tier team FK Cementarnica 55.
