= Lars Müller =

German footballer

Personal information
- Date of birth: 22 March 1976 (age 50)
- Place of birth: Werne, West Germany
- Height: 1.74 m (5 ft 9 in)
- Positions: Defender; midfielder

Team information
- Current team: Werner SC (Head coach)

Youth career
- SF Werne
- SV 1919 Herbern
- –1994: Hammer SpVg
- 1994–1995: Borussia Dortmund

Senior career*
Years	Team	Apps	(Gls)
1995–1996	Borussia Dortmund	6	(0)
1997–1999	KFC Uerdingen 05	42	(4)
1999–2001	Alemannia Aachen	44	(5)
2001–2006	1. FC Nürnberg	137	(6)
2006–2009	FC Augsburg	90	(3)
2009–2011	RB Leipzig	62	(13)
2011–2012	Hammer SpVg	10	(2)
Total		391	(33)

International career
1996–1998	Germany U21	9	(2)

Managerial career
- 2011–2012: Hammer SpVg (player-coach)
- 2017–: Werner SC
- * Club domestic league appearances and goals

Lars Müller (born 22 March 1976) is a German former professional footballer and head coach of Werner SC.

== Career ==
Müller was born in Werne. In his youth, he played for Sportfreunde Werne-West, a sports club based in his hometown, before being signed by SV 1919 Herbern. He then joined Hammer SpVg before being signed by Bundesliga club Borussia Dortmund in 1995.

He made his Bundesliga debut on 6 April 1996 in a 1–1 draw at home against Werder Bremen when he came on for Lars Ricken in the 77th minute. After only playing one game in his second year, he moved to second division KFC Uerdingen 05 where he played for three seasons and then moved to Alemannia Aachen where he played two season.

From 2001–02 to 2005–06 he played for 1. FC Nürnberg. For the 2006–07 season he moved to the 2. Bundesliga club FC Augsburg, where he became a regular player in 2008–09 season. After the end of the 2008–09 season, Müller was not a part of the plans at Augsburg under the new coach and therefore, he wasn't offered a new contract. In the summer 2009, he therefore moved to RB Leipzig.

In the summer 2011, Müller moved to Hammer SpVg as a player-head coach. After his release in November 2012, he took over the post of sporting director until the end of the season.

In June 2017, he was appointed head coach of Werner SC. As of February 2020, he was still the club's head coach.

== Honours ==
Borussia Dortmund

- Bundesliga: 1995–96
