= Thomas Stehle =

German footballer

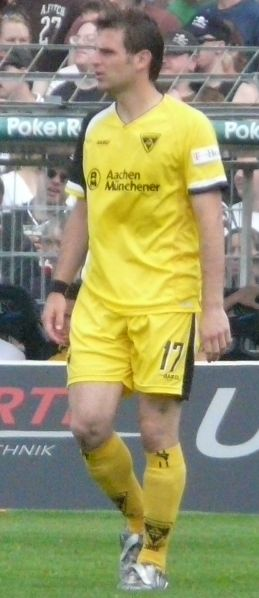
- Thomas Stehle

Personal information
- Full name: Thomas Stehle
- Date of birth: 26 October 1980 (age 46)
- Place of birth: Überlingen, West Germany
- Height: 1.80 m (5 ft 11 in)
- Position: Defender

Youth career
- 1992–1996: Rot-Weiß Salem
- 1996–2000: SC Pfullendorf

Senior career*
Years	Team	Apps	(Gls)
2000–2001	SC Pfullendorf	31	(2)
2001–2004	1. FC Nürnberg	54	(4)
2004–2013	Alemannia Aachen	131	(10)
- * Club domestic league appearances and goals as of 30 June 2013

Thomas Stehle (born 26 October 1980) is a German former football defender.
