= 2003–04 2. Bundesliga =

30th season of the second-tier football league in Germany

2. Bundesliga
- Season: 2003–04
- Champions: 1. FC Nürnberg
- Promoted: 1. FC Nürnberg; Arminia Bielefeld; Mainz 05
- Relegated: VfB Lübeck; Jahn Regensburg; Union Berlin; VfL Osnabrück
- Top goalscorer: Francisco Copado; Marek Mintál (18 goals each)

The 2003–04 2. Bundesliga was the 30th season of the 2. Bundesliga, the second tier of the German football league system. 1. FC Nürnberg, Arminia Bielefeld and Mainz 05 were promoted to the Bundesliga while VfB Lübeck, Jahn Regensburg, Union Berlin and VfL Osnabrück were relegated to the Regionalliga.

== League table ==
For the 2003–04 season SSV Jahn Regensburg, SpVgg Unterhaching, Erzgebirge Aue and VfL Osnabrück were newly promoted to the 2. Bundesliga from the Regionalliga while Arminia Bielefeld, 1. FC Nürnberg and FC Energie Cottbus had been relegated to the league from the Bundesliga.

Locations of the participating teams of the 2003–04 season

Pos	Team	Pld	W	D	L	GF	GA	GD	Pts	Promotion or relegation
1	1. FC Nürnberg (C, P)	34	18	7	9	68	45	+23	61	Promotion to Bundesliga
2	Arminia Bielefeld (P)	34	16	8	10	50	37	+13	56	Promotion to Bundesliga
3	Mainz 05 (P)	34	13	15	6	49	34	+15	54	Promotion to Bundesliga
4	Energie Cottbus	34	15	9	10	52	44	+8	54	
5	Rot-Weiß Oberhausen	34	15	8	11	52	48	+4	53	
6	Alemannia Aachen	34	15	8	11	51	51	0	53	Qualification to UEFA Cup first round (Note: As the DFB-Pokal winners that year, Werder Bremen, qualified for the Champions League, that year's finalists, Alemannia Aachen, qualified for the UEFA Cup.)
7	MSV Duisburg	34	13	9	12	52	46	+6	48	
8	Erzgebirge Aue	34	12	12	10	47	45	+2	48	
9	SpVgg Greuther Fürth	34	11	12	11	58	51	+7	45	
10	Wacker Burghausen	34	12	9	13	40	39	+1	45	
11	Eintracht Trier	34	12	9	13	46	51	−5	45	
12	LR Ahlen	34	12	8	14	36	45	−9	44	
13	SpVgg Unterhaching	34	11	10	13	41	46	−5	43	
14	Karlsruher SC	34	11	10	13	38	44	−6	43	
15	VfB Lübeck (R)	34	9	12	13	47	57	−10	39	Relegation to Regionalliga (Note: VfB Lübeck, 1. FC Union Berlin and VfL Osnabrück were relegated to Regionalliga Nord. Jahn Regensburg was relegated to Regionalliga Süd.)
16	Jahn Regensburg (R)	34	9	12	13	37	51	−14	39	Relegation to Regionalliga
17	Union Berlin (R)	34	8	9	17	43	53	−10	33	Relegation to Regionalliga
18	VfL Osnabrück (R)	34	7	7	20	35	55	−20	28	Relegation to Regionalliga

Source: Bundesliga.de
Rules for classification: 1) points; 2) goal difference; 3) number of goals scored.
(C) Champions; (P) Promoted; (R) Relegated

== Results ==
Home \ Away	AAC	LRA	AUE	UNB	DSC	WBU	FCE	DUI	SGF	KSC	LUE	M05	FCN	RWO	OSN	JRE	TRI	UNT
Alemannia Aachen	—	1–1	1–0	4–2	2–0	0–1	0–2	2–1	0–0	0–0	3–1	2–2	3–2	1–0	2–1	1–0	2–0	5–1
LR Ahlen	0–0	—	1–0	1–0	0–0	3–1	0–0	2–3	3–2	1–2	1–1	1–3	2–0	0–2	0–1	3–1	2–0	2–2
Erzgebirge Aue	0–1	2–0	—	2–1	1–1	3–0	1–0	2–1	1–1	2–0	0–0	1–1	3–3	1–1	1–0	0–1	2–1	3–3
Union Berlin	2–1	0–2	3–0	—	1–0	1–2	0–1	2–1	3–0	2–2	1–2	1–1	3–5	2–2	2–0	2–2	1–3	0–0
Arminia Bielefeld	3–0	3–0	1–1	2–1	—	3–1	1–3	1–3	1–1	3–1	1–3	1–0	1–3	1–3	5–0	0–0	3–1	1–0
Wacker Burghausen	1–1	0–1	2–0	3–1	0–1	—	1–1	1–2	0–2	0–0	2–1	2–0	0–0	5–0	4–1	2–0	1–1	0–2
Energie Cottbus	3–1	3–2	2–1	2–1	1–2	2–1	—	1–1	4–2	2–1	1–1	0–0	1–3	3–1	3–0	3–0	2–3	3–1
MSV Duisburg	2–1	1–2	2–2	1–0	0–2	1–0	4–2	—	1–1	0–2	2–1	0–1	2–1	1–1	3–1	2–2	2–0	0–1
Greuther Fürth	7–1	2–0	5–1	2–2	1–2	2–2	2–1	3–3	—	2–1	2–0	3–1	2–2	0–1	1–1	2–2	4–2	2–4
Karlsruher SC	1–0	1–0	3–5	2–1	2–2	0–0	3–1	1–0	1–0	—	1–0	1–1	2–3	1–2	3–0	0–3	0–1	0–1
VfB Lübeck	3–5	4–1	2–2	0–2	0–0	2–2	1–1	1–1	1–0	2–2	—	1–4	2–1	1–0	1–1	0–3	2–2	0–2
Mainz 05	3–2	0–0	1–1	2–1	0–2	1–0	4–1	4–1	1–3	1–1	3–1	—	2–1	2–0	0–0	1–1	3–0	2–0
1. FC Nürnberg	3–0	2–0	2–0	3–0	1–0	2–0	2–2	2–0	1–1	2–0	1–2	2–2	—	1–3	2–0	3–2	3–1	3–0
Rot-Weiß Oberhausen	1–2	1–3	1–4	0–0	3–2	1–2	0–0	0–3	3–1	1–0	3–3	0–0	3–1	—	3–2	2–1	1–2	3–1
VfL Osnabrück	3–1	1–2	0–1	0–2	0–0	3–0	0–1	2–2	0–1	1–2	3–1	2–2	3–4	0–2	—	3–0	3–0	2–1
Jahn Regensburg	1–2	3–0	1–1	3–1	1–2	0–2	0–0	0–5	0–0	1–1	0–4	0–0	2–1	1–1	1–0	—	2–1	1–0
Eintracht Trier	3–3	3–0	2–1	1–1	2–3	0–0	2–0	1–1	2–0	1–1	4–2	1–0	0–2	0–3	0–0	4–0	—	2–1
SpVgg Unterhaching	1–1	0–0	1–2	1–1	1–0	1–2	2–0	1–0	3–1	3–0	0–1	1–1	1–1	1–4	2–1	2–2	0–0	—

Source: DFB
Legend: Blue = home team win; Yellow = draw; Red = away team win.

== Top scorers ==
The league's top scorers:

Goals	Player	Team
18	(Spain) Francisco Copado	SpVgg Unterhaching
18	(Slovakia) Marek Mintál	1. FC Nürnberg
16	(Czech Republic) Petr Ruman	SpVgg Greuther Fürth
14	(Morocco) Abdelaziz Ahanfouf	MSV Duisburg
14	(Ghana) Isaac Boakye	Arminia Bielefeld
14	(United States) Conor Casey	Karlsruher SC
14	(Iran) Ferydoon Zandi	VfB Lübeck
13	(Germany) Steffen Baumgart	1. FC Union Berlin
13	(Germany) Marcus Feinbier	SpVgg Greuther Fürth
13	(Germany) Michael Thurk	1. FSV Mainz 05
