= 2007–08 VfB Stuttgart season =

VfB Stuttgart
2007-08 season
- Manager: Armin Veh
- Stadium: Gottlieb-Daimler-Stadion, Stuttgart, Baden-Württemberg
- Bundesliga: 6th
- DFB-Pokal: Quarter-finals
- Champions League: Group stage
- Top goalscorer: League: Mario Gómez (19); All: Mario Gómez (28)
- Highest home attendance: 58,500 vs Eintracht Frankfurt (3 May 2008) vs Arminia Bielefeld (17 May 2008)
- Lowest home attendance: 7,500 vs SC Paderborn (31 October 2007)

The 2007–08 season was VfB Stuttgart's 43rd season in the Bundesliga.

== Team kit ==
The team kit for the season was produced by Puma and the shirt sponsor is EnBW.

Home	Away	Third	Fourth

== Players ==
=== First-team squad ===
Squad at end of season

Note: Flags indicate national team as defined under FIFA eligibility rules; some limited exceptions apply. Players may hold more than one non-FIFA nationality.

No.	Pos.	Nation	Player
1	GK	GER	Raphael Schäfer (Note: Schäfer was born in Kędzierzyn-Koźle, Poland, but was raised in Germany from the age of 7 and represented Germany at U-15, U-16, and U-18 level.)
2	DF	GER	Andreas Beck (Note: Beck was born in Kemerovo, Soviet Union (now Russia), but was raised in Germany from the age of 3 and represented Germany at U-18, U-19, U-20 and U-21 level before making his international debut for Germany in February 2009.)
3	DF	MEX	Ricardo Osorio
5	DF	GER	Serdar Tasci
6	DF	POR	Fernando Meira (captain)
7	MF	GER	Silvio Meißner
8	MF	SWE	Alexander Farnerud
10	MF	TUR	Yıldıray Baştürk (Note: Baştürk was born in Herne, West Germany (now Germany), but also qualified to represent Turkey internationally and made his debut for Turkey in 1998.)
11	MF	GER	Thomas Hitzlsperger
13	MF	MEX	Pável Pardo (vice-captain)
15	DF	CIV	Arthur Boka
17	DF	FRA	Matthieu Delpierre
18	FW	BRA	Cacau (Note: Cacau was born in Santo André, Brazil, but also qualified to represent Germany internationally after gaining citizenship and made his international debut for Germany in May 2009.)
19	MF	GER	Roberto Hilbert
20	FW	ROU	Ciprian Marica

No.	Pos.	Nation	Player
21	DF	SUI	Ludovic Magnin
22	FW	GER	Sven Schipplock
23	FW	GER	Manuel Fischer
24	GK	GER	Sven Ulreich
25	MF	BRA	Antônio da Silva
26	DF	GER	Tobias Feisthammel
27	FW	GER	Johannes Rahn
28	MF	GER	Sami Khedira
31	GK	GER	Alexander Stolz
33	FW	GER	Mario Gómez
35	MF	GER	Christian Träsch
36	MF	GER	Peter Perchtold
39	FW	ROU	Sergiu Radu (on loan from VfL Wolfsburg)
40	MF	GER	Julian Schuster
42	DF	GER	Marco Pischorn

=== VfB Stuttgart II ===
VfB Stuttgart II were coached by Rainer Adrion. They finished 3rd in the Regionalliga Süd, securing qualification for the inaugural 3. Liga season.

Note: Flags indicate national team as defined under FIFA eligibility rules; some limited exceptions apply. Players may hold more than one non-FIFA nationality.

No.	Pos.	Nation	Player
—	GK	GER	Timo Hammel
—	GK	GER	Frank Lehmann
—	GK	GER	Alexander Stolz
—	GK	GER	Sven Ulreich
—	DF	GER	Steffen Dangelmayr
—	DF	GER	Tobias Feisthammel
—	DF	GER	Dubravko Kolinger
—	DF	KAZ	Anton Pelipetz
—	DF	GER	Marco Pischorn
—	DF	GER	David Pisot (to January)
—	DF	GER	Joachim Schwabe
—	DF	GER	Robin Schuster
—	MF	GER	Martin Dausch
—	MF	GER	Patrick Funk
—	MF	GER	Andreas Hindelang
—	MF	GER	Sebastian Hofmann

No.	Pos.	Nation	Player
—	MF	GER	José-Alex Ikeng (Note: Ikeng was born in Bafia, Cameroon, but also qualified to represent Germany internationally and represented Germany at U-18 level.)
—	MF	GER	Jeremy Karikari (from January)
—	MF	GER	Michael Klauß
—	MF	GER	Marijan Kovačević
—	MF	GER	Peter Perchtold
—	MF	GER	Sebastian Rudy
—	MF	GER	Christian Sauter
—	MF	GER	Julian Schuster
—	MF	GER	Christian Träsch
—	FW	GER	Manuel Fischer
—	FW	GER	Nico Klotz
—	FW	GER	Patrick Mayer (to January)
—	FW	POL	Matthias Morys
—	FW	GER	Sven Schipplock (from January)
—	FW	GER	Johannes Rahn

== Transfers ==
=== In ===
Summer transfer window

Note: Flags indicate national team as defined under FIFA eligibility rules; some limited exceptions apply. Players may hold more than one non-FIFA nationality.

No.	Pos.	Nation	Player
1	GK	GER	Raphael Schäfer (from 1. FC Nürnberg, undisclosed)
4	DF	BRA	Gledson (from Hansa Rostock, undisclosed)
7	MF	GER	Silvio Meißner (loan return from 1. FC Kaiserslautern)
9	FW	BRA	Ewerthon (on loan from Real Zaragoza)

No.	Pos.	Nation	Player
10	MF	TUR	Yıldıray Baştürk (from Hertha BSC, undisclosed)
20	FW	ROU	Ciprian Marica (from Shakhtar Donetsk, undisclosed)
27	MF	GER	Johannes Rahn (from TuS Koblenz, free)
29	MF	CMR	Georges Mandjeck (from Kadji Sports Academy, undisclosed)
31	GK	GER	Alexander Stolz (loan return from 1899 Hoffenheim)

Winter transfer window

Note: Flags indicate national team as defined under FIFA eligibility rules; some limited exceptions apply. Players may hold more than one non-FIFA nationality.

No. / Pos. / Nation / Player; 39 / FW / ROU / Sergiu Radu (on loan from VfL Wolfsburg until June 2008)	No. / Pos. / Nation / Player; — / FW / GER / Sven Schipplock (from SSV Reutlingen, free)

=== Out ===
Summer transfer window

Note: Flags indicate national team as defined under FIFA eligibility rules; some limited exceptions apply. Players may hold more than one non-FIFA nationality.

No.	Pos.	Nation	Player
1	GK	GER	Timo Hildebrand (to Valencia, undisclosed)
5	DF	GER	Markus Babbel (retired from football)
8	MF	GER	Daniel Bierofka (to 1860 Munich, free)
9	FW	SUI	Marco Streller (to Basel, free)
12	DF	GER	Heiko Gerber (to FC Ingolstadt, free)

No.	Pos.	Nation	Player
16	FW	GER	Benjamin Lauth (loan return to Hamburger SV)
23	GK	GER	Dirk Heinen (retired from football)
27	FW	GER	Tobias Weis (to 1899 Hoffenheim, free)
--	FW	CRO	Mario Carević (to SC Lokeren, free)
--	FW	DEN	Jon Dahl Tomasson (to Villarreal, undisclosed)

Winter transfer window

Note: Flags indicate national team as defined under FIFA eligibility rules; some limited exceptions apply. Players may hold more than one non-FIFA nationality.

No.	Pos.	Nation	Player
12	GK	AUT	Michael Langer (to SC Freiburg, undisclosed)
4	DF	BRA	Gledson (to Hansa Rostock, undisclosed)

No.	Pos.	Nation	Player
9	FW	BRA	Ewerthon (loan terminated, returned to Real Zaragoza)

=== Players out on loan ===
Note: Flags indicate national team as defined under FIFA eligibility rules; some limited exceptions apply. Players may hold more than one non-FIFA nationality.

No.	Pos.	Nation	Player
—	MF	GER	Christian Gentner (on loan to VfL Wolfsburg)
—	MF	BRA	Élson (on loan to Goiás)
—	FW	SRB	Danijel Ljuboja (Note: Ljuboja was born in Vinkovci, SFR Yugoslavia (now Croatia), but also qualified to represent Serbia and Montenegro and its successor state Serbia internationally through his parents and made his international debut for Serbia and Montenegro in 2003.) (on loan to VfL Wolfsburg until June 2008)

No.	Pos.	Nation	Player
29	MF	CMR	Georges Mandjeck (on loan to 1. FC Kaiserslautern)
38	DF	GER	David Pisot (on loan to SC Paderborn until June 2008)

== Statistics ==
Last updated on 12 May 2008.

=== Appearances and goals ===
No.	Pos	Nat	Player	Total		Bundesliga		Champions League		DFB Cup		Premiere Ligapokal	
No.	Pos	Nat	Player	Apps	Goals	Apps	Goals	Apps	Goals	Apps	Goals	Apps	Goals
1	GK	(Germany) GER	Raphael Schäfer	33	-63	23	-41	6	-15	3	-5	1	-2
2	DF	(Germany) GER	Andreas Beck	23	1	17	1	2	0	3	0	1	0
3	DF	(Mexico) MEX	Ricardo Osorio	30	0	22	0	5	0	2	0	1	0
5	DF	(Germany) GER	Serdar Tasci	30	0	22	0	6	0	2	0	0	0
6	DF	(Portugal) POR	Fernando Meira	37	3	27	3	6	0	3	0	1	0
7	MF	(Germany) GER	Silvio Meißner	11	0	7	0	2	0	1	0	1	0
8	MF	(Sweden) SWE	Alexander Farnerud	18	0	12	0	4	0	1	0	1	0
10	MF	(Turkey) TUR	Yıldıray Baştürk	32	4	25	4	4	0	3	0	0	0
11	MF	(Germany) GER	Thomas Hitzlsperger	32	7	25	5	2	0	4	2	1	0
13	MF	(Mexico) MEX	Pável Pardo	38	3	29	2	4	1	3	0	2	0
15	DF	(Ivory Coast) CIV	Arthur Boka	23	0	18	0	3	0	1	0	1	0
17	DF	(France) FRA	Matthieu Delpierre	28	0	22	0	3	0	3	0	0	0
18	FW	(Brazil) BRA	Cacau	34	10	27	9	5	1	1	0	1	0
19	MF	(Germany) GER	Roberto Hilbert	40	6	31	4	5	0	3	2	1	0
20	FW	(Romania) ROU	Ciprian Marica	35	3	28	2	4	1	3	0	0	0
21	DF	(Switzerland) SUI	Ludovic Magnin	31	0	27	0	3	0	1	0	0	0
23	FW	(Germany) GER	Manuel Fischer	3	1	2	1	1	0	0	0	0	0
24	GK	(Germany) GER	Sven Ulreich	12	-18	11	-16	0	0	1	-2	0	0
25	MF	(Brazil) BRA	Antônio da Silva	27	4	20	3	3	1	3	0	1	0
28	MF	(Germany) GER	Sami Khedira	34	1	24	1	5	0	4	0	1	0
29	MF	(Cameroon) CMR	Georges Mandjeck	1	0	0	0	0	0	0	0	1	0
31	GK	(Germany) GER	Alexander Stolz	0	0	0	0	0	0	0	0	0	0
33	FW	(Germany) GER	Mario Gómez	32	28	25	19	4	3	3	6	0	0
35	DF	(Germany) GER	Christian Träsch	1	0	1	0	0	0	0	0	0	0
36	MF	(Germany) GER	Peter Perchtold	1	0	1	0	0	0	0	0	0	0
39	FW	(Romania) ROU	Sergiu Radu	3	0	2	0	0	0	1	0	0	0
40	MF	(Germany) GER	Julian Schuster	3	0	2	0	0	0	1	0	0	0
42	DF	(Germany) GER	Marco Pischorn	3	0	2	0	0	0	1	0	0	0
Players sold or loaned out during the 2008 winter transfer window:
4	DF	(Brazil) BRA	Gledson	2	0	0	0	0	0	1	0	1	0
9	FW	(Brazil) BRA	Ewerthon	17	1	11	1	4	0	1	0	1	0
12	GK	(Austria) AUT	Michael Langer	0	0	0	0	0	0	0	0	0	0

=== Disciplinary record ===
Disciplinary records for 2007–08 league matches. Players with 1 card or more included only.

No.	Nat.	Player	Yellow cards	Red cards
1	(Germany)	Raphael Schäfer	1	0
2	(Germany)	Andreas Beck	2	0
3	(Mexico)	Ricardo Osorio	1	1
5	(Germany)	Serdar Tasci	5	0
6	(Portugal)	Fernando Meira	3	2
7	(Germany)	Silvio Meißner	1	0
8	(Sweden)	Alexander Farnerud	2	0
10	(Turkey)	Yıldıray Baştürk	2	0
11	(Germany)	Thomas Hitzlsperger	3	0
13	(Mexico)	Pável Pardo	4	2
15	(Ivory Coast)	Arthur Boka	3	0
17	(France)	Matthieu Delpierre	4	1
18	(Brazil)	Cacau	6	0
19	(Germany)	Roberto Hilbert	7	0
20	(Romania)	Ciprian Marica	4	0
21	(Switzerland)	Ludovic Magnin	4	0
25	(Brazil)	Antônio da Silva	2	0
28	(Germany)	Sami Khedira	4	0
33	(Germany)	Mario Gómez	1	0
36	(Germany)	Peter Perchtold	1	0
Players sold or loaned out during the 2008 winter transfer window:
9	(Brazil)	Ewerthon	1	0

== Club ==
=== Management ===
Position	Staff
Manager	(Germany) Armin Veh
Assistant manager	(Germany) Markus Babbel
Assistant manager	(Germany) Alfons Higl
Club doctor	(Barbados) Raymond Best
Club doctor	(Germany) Heiko Striegel

Last updated: 27 November 2007
Source: VfB.de

=== Other information ===
Chairman	(Germany) Erwin Staudt
Ground (capacity and dimensions)	Gottlieb-Daimler-Stadion (55,896 / )

Source: VfB.de

== Competitions ==
=== DFL-Ligapokal ===
5 July 2007 Semi-finals	VfB Stuttgart	0–2	Bayern Munich	Stuttgart
20:30		(Report)	Ribéry 8'; Wagner 66'	Stadium: Gottlieb-Daimler-Stadion; Attendance: 45,000; Referee: Babak Rafati

=== Bundesliga ===
==== League table ====
Pos	Team	Pld	W	D	L	GF	GA	GD	Pts	Qualification or relegation
4	Hamburger SV	34	14	12	8	47	26	+21	54	Qualification to UEFA Cup first round
5	VfL Wolfsburg	34	15	9	10	58	46	+12	54	Qualification to UEFA Cup first round
6	VfB Stuttgart	34	16	4	14	57	57	0	52	Qualification to Intertoto Cup third round
7	Bayer Leverkusen	34	15	6	13	57	40	+17	51	
8	Hannover 96	34	13	10	11	54	56	−2	49	

Source: www.dfb.de
Rules for classification: 1) points; 2) goal difference; 3) number of goals scored.

==== Results summary ====
Overall								Home						Away					
Pld	W	D	L	GF	GA	GD	Pts	W	D	L	GF	GA	GD	W	D	L	GF	GA	GD
34	16	4	14	55	55	0	52	12	2	3	37	17	+20	4	2	11	18	38	−20

Last updated: 17 May 2008.
Source: VfB.de

==== Results by round ====
Round	1	2	3	4	5	6	7	8	9	10	11	12	13	14	15	16	17	18	19	20	21	22	23	24	25	26	27	28	29	30	31	32	33	34
Ground	H	A	H	A	H	A	H	A	H	A	H	A	H	A	H	H	A	A	A	A	H	H	A	A	H	A	H	A	H	A	H	A	A	H
Result	D	L	W	L	W	L	W	L	L	L	W	W	W	W	L	W	L	L	L	W	W	W	W	D	W	D	W	L	W	L	W	L	L	D
Position	7	15	9	15	9	13	9	10	12	14	12	11	9	7	8	8	8	9	10	10	8	7	6	6	6	6	5	6	5	6	5	5	7	6

Updated to match(es) played on 17 May 2008. Source: VfB.de
A = Away; H = Home; W = Win; D = Draw; L = Loss

==== Matches ====
10 August 2007 1	VfB Stuttgart	2–2	Schalke 04	Stuttgart
20:30	Khedira 63'; Pardo 67'	(Report)	Kobiashvili 25'; Rakitić 76'	Stadium: Gottlieb-Daimler-Stadion; Attendance: 57,500; Referee: Herbert Fandel

18 August 2007 2	Hertha BSC	3–1	VfB Stuttgart	Berlin
15:30	Chahed 51'; Fathi 65'; Okoronkwo 80'	(Report)	Hitzlsperger 15'	Stadium: Olympiastadion; Attendance: 50,000; Referee: Thorsten Kinhöfer

25 August 2007 3	VfB Stuttgart	1–0	MSV Duisburg	Stuttgart
15:30	Gómez 34'	(Report)		Stadium: Gottlieb-Daimler-Stadion; Attendance: 40,000; Referee: Manuel Gräfe

2 September 2007 4	Karlsruher SC	1–0	VfB Stuttgart	Karlsruhe
17:00	Hajnal 54'	(Report)		Stadium: Wildparkstadion; Attendance: 27,800; Referee: Markus Merk

15 September 2007 5	VfB Stuttgart	3–0	Energie Cottbus	Stuttgart
15:30	Cacau 53'; Ewerthon 78'; Gómez 82'	(Report)		Stadium: Gottlieb-Daimler-Stadion; Attendance: 41,000; Referee: Babak Rafati

22 September 2007 6	Werder Bremen	4–1	VfB Stuttgart	Bremen
15:30	Almeida 3' 4'; Sanogo 15'; Diego 89'	(Report)	Gómez 13'	Stadium: Weserstadion; Attendance: 40,000; Referee: Wolfgang Stark

26 September 2007 7	VfB Stuttgart	1–0	VfL Bochum	Stuttgart
20:00	Hilbert 50'	(Report)		Stadium: Gottlieb-Daimler-Stadion; Attendance: 33,000; Referee: Florian Meyer

29 September 2007 8	Hansa Rostock	2–1	VfB Stuttgart	Rostock
15:30	Rathgeb 16'; Orestes 18'	(Report)	Gómez 73'	Stadium: DKB-Arena; Attendance: 20,000; Referee: Michael Kempter

6 October 2007 9	VfB Stuttgart	0–2	Hannover 96	Stuttgart
15:30	Meira (red card) 7'	(Report)	Huszti 8', 52'	Stadium: Gottlieb-Daimler-Stadion; Attendance: 51,000; Referee: Markus Merk

20 October 2007 10	Hamburger SV	4–1	VfB Stuttgart	Hamburg
15:30	Olić 7', 32', 55'; Mathijsen 60'	(Report)	Pardo (red card) 45'; Tasci 73'	Stadium: HSH Nordbank Arena; Attendance: 47,000; Referee: Helmut Fleischer

27 October 2007 11	VfB Stuttgart	1–0	Bayer Leverkusen	Stuttgart
15:30	Beck 72'	(Report)		Stadium: Gottlieb-Daimler-Stadion; Attendance: 51,000; Referee: Günter Perl

3 November 2007 12	1. FC Nürnberg	0–1	VfB Stuttgart	Nuremberg
15:30		(Report)	Gómez 15'	Stadium: easyCredit-Stadion; Attendance: 40,000; Referee: Herbert Fandel

10 November 2007 13	VfB Stuttgart	3–1	Bayern Munich	Stuttgart
15:30	Gómez 10', 42'; Baştürk 30'	(Report)	Toni 86'	Stadium: Gottlieb-Daimler-Stadion; Attendance: 55,600; Referee: Thorsten Kinhöfer

24 November 2007 14	Eintracht Frankfurt	1–4	VfB Stuttgart	Frankfurt
15:30	Köhler 41'	(Report)	Hilbert 45'; Marica 48'; Hitzlsperger 57'; Cacau 90+2'	Stadium: Commerzbank-Arena; Attendance: 51,500; Referee: Peter Gagelmann

1 December 2007 15	VfB Stuttgart	1–2	Borussia Dortmund	Stuttgart
15:30	Meira 35'	(Report)	Valdez 10'; Petrić 79'	Stadium: Gottlieb-Daimler-Stadion; Attendance: 55,800; Referee: Felix Brych

8 December 2007 16	VfB Stuttgart	3–1	VfL Wolfsburg	Stuttgart
15:30	Marica 26'; Cacau 47'; Hitzlsperger 86'	(Report)	Džeko 49'	Stadium: Gottlieb-Daimler-Stadion; Attendance: 53,000; Referee: Markus Merk

15 December 2007 17	Arminia Bielefeld	2–0	VfB Stuttgart	Bielefeld
15:30	Kamper 79'; Wichniarek 90'	(Report)	Pardo (yellow card) 47' (yellow-red card) 73'; Osorio (red card) 86'	Stadium: SchücoArena; Attendance: 20,600; Referee: Manuel Gräfe

3 February 2008 18	Schalke 04	4–1	VfB Stuttgart	Gelsenkirchen
17:00	Kurányi 32', 51'; Westermann 75'; Zé Roberto 90'	(Report)	Silva 61'	Stadium: Veltins-Arena; Attendance: 61,482; Referee: Felix Brych

9 February 2008 19	VfB Stuttgart	1–3	Hertha BSC Berlin	Stuttgart
15:30	Delpierre (yellow card) 15' (yellow-red card) 81'; Gómez 40'	(Report)	Pantelić 7', 45'; Raffael 48'	Stadium: Gottlieb-Daimler-Stadion; Attendance: 48,000; Referee: Herbert Fandel

16 February 2008 20	MSV Duisburg	2–3	VfB Stuttgart	Duisburg
17:00	Niculescu 49'; Ishiaku 57'	(Report)	Gómez 16', 41'; Hitzlsperger 90+2'	Stadium: MSV-Arena; Attendance: 21,000; Referee: Babak Rafati

23 February 2008 21	VfB Stuttgart	3–1	Karlsruher SC	Stuttgart
15:30	Gómez 5'; Hilbert 26'; Cacau 88'	(Report)	Hajnal 81'	Stadium: Gottlieb-Daimler-Stadion; Attendance: 55,800; Referee: Markus Merk

8 March 2008 22	VfB Stuttgart	6–3	Werder Bremen	Stuttgart
15:30	Gómez 19', 43', 65'; Cacau 66', 87'; Mertesacker 83' (o.g.)	(Report)	Almeida 8'; Boenisch 60'; Rosenberg 76'	Stadium: Gottlieb-Daimler-Stadion; Attendance: 55,000; Referee: Herbert Fandel

11 March 2008 23	Energie Cottbus	0–1	VfB Stuttgart	Cottbus
18:00		(Report)	Meira 30'	Stadium: Stadion der Freundschaft; Attendance: 30,150; Referee: Peter Gagelmann

15 March 2008 24	VfL Bochum	1–1	VfB Stuttgart	Bochum
15:30	Dabrowski 20'	(Report)	Hitzlsperger 47'	Stadium: rewirpowerSTADION; Attendance: 25,086; Referee: Peter Sippel

22 March 2008 25	VfB Stuttgart	4–1	Hansa Rostock	Stuttgart
15:30	Pardo 51' (pen.); Cacau 54'; Gómez 87'; Baştürk 90'	(Report)	Orestes 56'	Stadium: Gottlieb-Daimler-Stadion; Attendance: 36,000; Referee: Günter Perl

30 March 2008 26	Hannover 96	0–0	VfB Stuttgart	Hanover
18:00		(Report)		Stadium: AWD-Arena; Attendance: 45,000; Referee: Marc Seemann

5 April 2008 27	VfB Stuttgart	1–0	Hamburg	Stuttgart
15:30	Hilbert 20'	(Report)		Stadium: Gottlieb-Daimler-Stadion; Attendance: 48,000; Referee: Babak Rafati

13 April 2008 28	Bayer Leverkusen	3–0	VfB Stuttgart	Leverkusen
17:00	Rolfes 41', 70'; Kießling 45'	(Report)		Stadium: BayArena; Attendance: 22,500; Referee: Michael Kempter

16 April 2008 29	VfB Stuttgart	3–0	1. FC Nürnberg	Stuttgart
20:00	Cacau 4'; Silva 13'; Meira 31'	(Report)		Stadium: Gottlieb-Daimler-Stadion; Attendance: 48,000; Referee: Lutz Wagner

27 April 2008 30	Bayern Munich	4–1	VfB Stuttgart	Munich
17:00	Toni 8'; Van Bommel 55'; Ribéry 75', 76'	(Report)	Silva 19'	Stadium: Allianz Arena; Attendance: 69,000; Referee: Florian Meyer

3 May 2008 31	VfB Stuttgart	4–1	Eintracht Frankfurt	Stuttgart
15:30	Baştürk 3', 18'; Gómez 6'; Cacau 47'	(Report)	Amanatidis 62'	Stadium: Gottlieb-Daimler-Stadion; Attendance: 65,500; Referee: Markus Merk

6 May 2008 32	Borussia Dortmund	3–2	VfB Stuttgart	Dortmund
20:00	Tinga 35'; Frei 59', 79'	(Report)	Gómez 55', 83'	Stadium: Signal Iduna Park; Attendance: 63,000; Referee: Michael Kempter

10 May 2008 33	VfL Wolfsburg	4–0	VfB Stuttgart	Wolfsburg
15:30	Marcelinho 16'; Džeko 22'; Costa 65'; Dejagah 75'	(Report)	Meira (red card) 17'	Stadium: Volkswagen-Arena; Attendance: 26,000; Referee: Wolfgang Stark

17 May 2008 34	VfB Stuttgart	2–2	Arminia Bielefeld	Stuttgart
15:30	Gómez 74' (pen.); Fischer 85'	(Report)	Tesche 10'; Eigler 87'	Stadium: Gottlieb-Daimler-Stadion; Attendance: 65,500; Referee: Florian Meyer

=== DFB-Pokal ===
4 August 2007 First round	Wehen Wiesbaden	1–2	VfB Stuttgart	Mainz
18:30	Catić 47'	(Report)	Gledson (red card) 46'; Hilbert 65', 90'; Meira (red card) 86'	Stadium: Stadion am Bruchweg; Attendance: 15,200; Referee: Felix Brych

31 October 2007 Second roud	VfB Stuttgart	3–2 (a.e.t.)	SC Paderborn	Stuttgart
19:00	Hitzlsperger 31', 36'; Gómez 118'	(Report)	Koen 66'; Döring 69'	Stadium: Gottlieb-Daimler-Stadion; Attendance: 7,500; Referee: Michael Kempter

30 January 2008 Third round	Werder Bremen II	2–3	VfB Stuttgart	Bremen
19:00	Heider 57'; Peitz 71'	(Report)	Gómez 29', 32', 42'	Stadium: Weserstadion; Attendance: 10,310; Referee: Jochen Drees

26 February 2008 Quarter-finals	VfB Stuttgart	2–2 (a.e.t.) (4–5 p)	Carl Zeiss Jena	Stuttgart
19:00	Gómez 80', 95'	(Report)	Werner 32'; Müller 120'	Stadium: Gottlieb-Daimler-Stadion; Attendance: 18,500; Referee: Thorsten Kinhöfer
	Penalties
	Pardo (penalty scored); Hilbert (penalty scored); Cacau (penalty scored); Silva (penalty missed); Hitzlsperger (penalty scored)		(penalty scored) Müller; (penalty scored) Werner; (penalty scored) Saka; (penalty scored) Šimák; (penalty scored) Ziegner

==== Disciplinary record ====
Players with 1 card or more included only.

No.	Nat.	Player	Yellow cards	Red cards
2	(Germany)	Andreas Beck	2	0
6	(Portugal)	Fernando Meira	1	1
10	(Turkey)	Yıldıray Baştürk	2	0
11	(Germany)	Thomas Hitzlsperger	1	0
13	(Mexico)	Pável Pardo	1	0
15	(Ivory Coast)	Arthur Boka	1	0
17	(France)	Matthieu Delpierre	1	0
33	(Germany)	Mario Gómez	2	0
Players sold or loaned out during the 2008 winter transfer window:
4	(Brazil)	Gledson (footballer, born 1979)	0	1

=== Champions League ===
==== Group stage ====
Pos	Team	Pld	W	D	L	GF	GA	GD	Pts	Qualification	BAR	LYO	RAN	STU
1	(Spain) Barcelona	6	4	2	0	12	3	+9	14	Advance to knockout stage	—	3–0	2–0	3–1
2	(France) Lyon	6	3	1	2	11	10	+1	10	Advance to knockout stage	2–2	—	0–3	4–2
3	(Scotland) Rangers	6	2	1	3	7	9	−2	7	Transfer to UEFA Cup	0–0	0–3	—	2–1
4	(Germany) VfB Stuttgart	6	1	0	5	7	15	−8	3		0–2	0–2	3–2	—

Source: RSSSF

19 September 2007 1	Rangers (Scotland)	2–1	(Germany) VfB Stuttgart	Glasgow
20:45	Adam 62'; Darcheville 75' (pen.)	(Report)	Gómez 56'	Stadium: Ibrox Stadium; Attendance: 49,795; Referee: Stefano Farina (Italy)

2 October 2007 2	VfB Stuttgart (Germany)	0–2	(Spain) Barcelona	Stuttgart
20:45		(Report)	Puyol 58'; Messi 66'	Stadium: Gottlieb-Daimler-Stadion; Attendance: 51,825; Referee: Martin Hansson (Sweden)

23 October 2007 3	VfB Stuttgart (Germany)	0–2	(France) Lyon	Stuttgart
20:45		(Report)	Santos 55'; Benzema 79'	Stadium: Gottlieb-Daimler-Stadion; Attendance: 51,000; Referee: Lucílio Batista (Portugal)

7 November 2007 4	Lyon (France)	4–2	(Germany) VfB Stuttgart	Lyon
20:45	Ben Arfa 5', 37'; Källstrom 15'; Juninho 90'	(Report)	Gómez 16', 56'	Stadium: Stade Gerland; Attendance: 38,215; Referee: Yuri Baskakov (Russia)

27 November 2007 5	VfB Stuttgart (Germany)	3–2	(Scotland) Rangers	Stuttgart
20:45	Cacau 45'; Pardo 62'; Marica 85'	(Report)	Adam 27'; Ferguson 70'	Stadium: Gottlieb-Daimler-Stadion; Attendance: 51,000; Referee: Darko Čeferin (Slovenia)

12 December 2007 6	Barcelona (Spain)	3–1	(Germany) VfB Stuttgart	Barcelona
20:45	Dos Santos 36'; Eto'o 57'; Ronaldinho 67'	(Report)	Silva 3'	Stadium: Camp Nou; Attendance: 60,000; Referee: Stéphane Lannoy (Federation)

==== Disciplinary record ====
Players with 1 card or more included only.

No.	Nat.	Player	Yellow cards	Red cards
5	(Germany)	Serdar Tasci	1	0
6	(Portugal)	Fernando Meira	2	0
7	(Germany)	Silvio Meißner	1	0
8	(Sweden)	Alexander Farnerud	2	0
10	(Turkey)	Yıldıray Baştürk	1	0
13	(Mexico)	Pável Pardo	1	0
18	(Brazil)	Cacau	1	0
19	(Germany)	Roberto Hilbert	1	0
21	(Switzerland)	Ludovic Magnin	1	0
28	(Germany)	Sami Khedira	1	0
