= 2008–09 VfB Stuttgart season =

VfB Stuttgart
2008–09 season
- Manager: Markus Babbel
- Bundesliga: 3rd
- UEFA Cup: Round of 32
- DFB-Pokal: Last 16
- Top goalscorer: League: Mario Gómez (24); All: Mario Gómez (35)
Home colours	Away colours	Third colours

During the 2008–09 VfB Stuttgart season, the club was a genuine contender for the Bundesliga title, losing out only to VfL Wolfsburg and Bayern Munich and finishing in third position. Striker Mario Gómez scored 24 goals in the Bundesliga campaign, only to then make a shock switch to rivals Bayern for the highest-received transfer fee in the club's history.

== Players ==
=== First-team squad ===
Squad at end of season

Note: Flags indicate national team as defined under FIFA eligibility rules; some limited exceptions apply. Players may hold more than one non-FIFA nationality.

No.	Pos.	Nation	Player
1	GK	GER	Jens Lehmann
3	DF	MEX	Ricardo Osorio
4	DF	NED	Khalid Boulahrouz
5	DF	GER	Serdar Tasci
6	DF	GER	Georg Niedermeier (on loan from Bayern Munich II)
7	MF	GER	Martin Lanig
8	MF	CZE	Jan Šimák
9	FW	ROU	Ciprian Marica
10	MF	TUR	Yıldıray Baştürk (Note: Baştürk was born in Herne, West Germany (now Germany), but also qualified to represent Turkey internationally and made his international debut for Turkey in 1998.)
11	MF	GER	Thomas Hitzlsperger
12	GK	GER	Alexander Stolz
13	MF	GER	Timo Gebhart
15	DF	CIV	Arthur Boka
16	MF	GER	Sebastian Rudy
17	DF	FRA	Matthieu Delpierre
18	FW	GER	Cacau (Note: Cacau was born in Santo André, Brazil, but also qualified to represent Germany internationally after gaining citizenship and made his international debut for Germany in May 2009.)
19	DF	GER	Roberto Hilbert

No.	Pos.	Nation	Player
21	DF	SUI	Ludovic Magnin
22	FW	GER	Sven Schipplock
24	GK	GER	Sven Ulreich
25	MF	BRA	Élson
26	DF	GER	Tobias Feisthammel
28	MF	GER	Sami Khedira
29	MF	CMR	Georges Mandjeck
33	FW	GER	Mario Gómez
35	DF	GER	Christian Träsch
36	DF	GER	Robin Schuster
37	GK	GER	Timo Hammel
38	FW	SRB	Danijel Ljuboja (Note: Ljuboja was born in Vinkovci, SFR Yugoslavia (now Croatia), but also qualified to represent Serbia and Montenegro and its successor state Serbia internationally through his parents and made his international debut for Serbia and Montenegro in 2003.)
39	FW	GER	Julian Schieber
40	MF	GER	Marijan Kovačević
42	DF	GER	Marco Pischorn
45	DF	GER	Sebastian Enderle

=== Left club during season ===
Note: Flags indicate national team as defined under FIFA eligibility rules; some limited exceptions apply. Players may hold more than one non-FIFA nationality.

No.	Pos.	Nation	Player
13	MF	MEX	Pável Pardo (to América)
23	FW	GER	Manuel Fischer (on loan to TuS Koblenz)

No.	Pos.	Nation	Player
31	FW	POL	Matthias Morys (to Kickers Offenbach)

=== VfB Stuttgart II ===
VfB Stuttgart II were coached by Rainer Adrion and finished 11th in the 3. Liga.

Note: Flags indicate national team as defined under FIFA eligibility rules; some limited exceptions apply. Players may hold more than one non-FIFA nationality.

No.	Pos.	Nation	Player
1	GK	GER	Timo Hammel
2	DF	GER	Tobias Feisthammel
3	DF	GER	Joachim Schwabe
4	DF	GER	David Pisot
5	MF	GER	Marijan Kovačević
6	MF	GER	Christian Träsch
7	FW	GER	Nico Klotz
8	MF	GER	Martin Dausch
9	MF	GER	Sebastian Hofmann
10	MF	GER	José-Alex Ikeng (Note: Ikeng was born in Bafia, Cameroon, but also qualified to represent Germany internationally and represented Germany at U-18 level.) (to January)
10	MF	GER	Markus Pazurek (from January)
13	FW	GER	Johannes Rahn
15	MF	GER	Daniel Didavi
16	MF	GER	Sebastian Rudy
11	MF	GER	Michael Klauß

No.	Pos.	Nation	Player
14	MF	GER	Patrick Funk
17	MF	GER	Jeremy Karikari
18	DF	GER	Robin Schuster
19	FW	GER	Julian Schieber
20	MF	GER	Andreas Hindelang
21	DF	GER	Dubravko Kolinger
22	FW	GER	Sven Schipplock
23	DF	GER	Sebastian Enderle
24	GK	GER	Sven Ulreich
25	DF	MKD	Shaban Ismaili
26	DF	GER	Sven Schimmel
27	MF	AUT	Clemens Walch
30	FW	GER	Manuel Fischer (to January)
31	GK	GER	Marcel Schmid
42	DF	GER	Marco Pischorn

== Bundesliga ==
=== Classification ===
Pos	Team	Pld	W	D	L	GF	GA	GD	Pts	Qualification or relegation
1	VfL Wolfsburg (C)	34	21	6	7	80	41	+39	69	Qualification to Champions League group stage
2	Bayern Munich	34	20	7	7	71	42	+29	67	Qualification to Champions League group stage
3	VfB Stuttgart	34	19	7	8	63	43	+20	64	Qualification to Champions League play-off round
4	Hertha BSC	34	19	6	9	48	41	+7	63	Qualification to Europa League play-off round
5	Hamburger SV	34	19	4	11	49	47	+2	61	Qualification to Europa League third qualifying round

Source: kicker (in German)
Rules for classification: 1) points; 2) goal difference; 3) number of goals scored.
(C) Champions

=== Results ===
17 August 2008 1	Borussia Mönchengladbach	1–3	VfB Stuttgart	Mönchengladbach
16:00	Rob Friend 60'		Hitzlsperger 15'; Marica 26'; Gómez 44'	Stadium: Borussia-Park; Attendance: 47,028; Referee: Herbert Fandel

23 August 2008 2	VfB Stuttgart	0–2	Bayer Leverkusen	Stuttgart
14:30			Helmes 35', Gekas 79'	Stadium: Mercedes-Benz Arena; Attendance: 48,000; Referee: Jochen Drees

31 August 2008 3	VfB Stuttgart	2–0	Hannover 96	Stuttgart
16:00	Gómez 18'; Pardo 40' (pen.)			Stadium: Mercedes-Benz Arena; Attendance: 41,000; Referee: Lutz Wagner

13 September 2008 4	1899 Hoffenheim	0–0	VfB Stuttgart	Sinsheim
14:30				Stadium: Carl-Benz-Stadion; Attendance: 26,400; Referee: Peter Sippel

21 September 2008 5	VfB Stuttgart	3–1	Karlsruher SC	Stuttgart
16:00	Khedira 22'; Gómez 68'; Ciprian Marica 87'		Sebastian Freis 8'	Stadium: Mercedes-Benz Arena; Attendance: 55,000; Referee: Peter Gagelmann

27 September 2008 6	Borussia Dortmund	3–0	VfB Stuttgart	Dortmund
14:30	Hajnal 10'; Santana 20'; Frei 73'			Stadium: Westfalenstadion; Attendance: 71,200; Referee: Felix Brych

4 October 2008 7	VfB Stuttgart	4–1	Werder Bremen	Stuttgart
14:30	Khedira 18'; Träsch 29'; Hilbert 63'; Lanig 88'		Diego 65'	Stadium: Mercedes-Benz Arena; Attendance: 55,800; Referee: Herbert Fandel

18 October 2008 8	Hertha BSC	2–1	VfB Stuttgart	Berlin
14:30	Nicu 26'; Kacar 87'		Cacau 31'	Stadium: Olympiastadion; Attendance: 42,336; Referee: Peter Sippel

26 October 2008 9	VfB Stuttgart	3–0	VfL Bochum	Stuttgart
17:00	Mario Gómez 80', 83'			Stadium: Mercedes-Benz Arena; Attendance: 43,000; Referee: Manuel Gräfe

29 October 2008 10	Hamburger SV	2–0	VfB Stuttgart	Hamburg
20:00	Trochowski 17' (pen.); Mathijsen 74'			Stadium: HSH Nordbank Arena; Attendance: 50,037; Referee: Günter Perl

1 November 2008 11	VfB Stuttgart	1–3	Köln	Stuttgart
15:30	Hilbert 69'		Novakovic 3', 61'; Petit 90+4'	Stadium: Mercedes-Benz Arena; Attendance: 55,000; Referee: Thorsten Kinhöfer

9 November 2008 12	Eintracht Frankfurt	2–2	VfB Stuttgart	Frankfurt
17:00	Lyberopoulos 18', 66'		Lanig 71'; Gómez 87'	Stadium: Commerzbank-Arena; Attendance: 51,000; Referee: Babak Rafati

15 November 2008 13	VfB Stuttgart	0–0	Arminia Bielefeld	Stuttgart
15:30				Stadium: Mercedes-Benz Arena; Attendance: 52,000; Referee: Florian Meyer

22 November 2008 14	VfL Wolfsburg	4–1	VfB Stuttgart	Wolfsburg
15:30	Grafite 51', 76'; Džeko 79', 85'		Lanig 17'	Stadium: Volkswagen Arena; Attendance: 26,897; Referee: Helmut Fleischer

30 November 2008 15	VfB Stuttgart	2–0	Schalke 04	Stuttgart
17:00	Jan Simak 79'; Mario Gómez 83'			Stadium: Mercedes-Benz Arena; Attendance: 55,800; Referee: Wolfgang Stark

6 December 2008 16	Energie Cottbus	0–3	VfB Stuttgart	Cottbus
15:30			Hilbert 4'; Simak 63'; Khedira 68'	Stadium: Stadion der Freundschaft; Attendance: 13,527; Referee: Jochen Drees

13 December 2008 17	VfB Stuttgart	2–2	Bayern Munich	Stuttgart
15:30	Khedira 45+1', 90+1'		Borowski 48'; Toni 66'	Stadium: Mercedes-Benz Arena; Attendance: 55,896; Referee: Thorsten Kinhöfer

31 January 2009 18	VfB Stuttgart	2–0	Borussia Mönchengladbach	Stuttgart
15:30	Marica 67'; Gómez 86'			Stadium: Mercedes-Benz Arena; Attendance: 41,300; Referee: Wolfgang Stark

7 February 2009 19	Bayer Leverkusen	2–4	VfB Stuttgart	Leverkusen
15:30	Kießling 67'; Charisteas 90+3'		Gómez 3', 75'; Hitzlsperger 51'; Sinkiewicz 90'	Stadium: ESPRIT arena Attendance: 33,000; Referee: Günter Perl

14 February 2009 20	Hannover 96	3–3	VfB Stuttgart	Hanover
15:30	Stajner 43'; Krzynowek 45+2'; Forssell 85'		Gómez 7'; Lanig 22'; Hitzlsperger 87'	Stadium: Heinz-von-Heiden-Arena; Attendance: 31,127; Referee: Manuel Gräfe

21 February 2009 21	VfB Stuttgart	3–3	1899 Hoffenheim	Stuttgart
15:30	Cacau 26'; Gómez 31', 63'		Demba Ba 24', 45', 67'	Stadium: Mercedes-Benz Arena; Attendance: 54,000; Referee: Michael Kempter

1 March 2009 22	Karlsruher SC	0–2	VfB Stuttgart	Karlsruhe
17:15			Élson 50'; Khedira 88'	Stadium: Wildparkstadion; Attendance: 29,252; Referee: Felix Brych

7 March 2009 23	VfB Stuttgart	2–1	Borussia Dortmund	Stuttgart
15:30	Élson 10'; Gómez 62'		Valdez 52'	Stadium: Mercedes-Benz Arena; Attendance: 55,896; Referee: Florian Meyer

15 March 2009 24	Werder Bremen	4–0	VfB Stuttgart	Bremen
17:00	Diego (footballer, born 1985) 34'; Pizarro 53'; Rosenberg 59', 74'			Stadium: Wohninvest-Weserstadion; Attendance: 39,272; Referee: Günter Perl

21 March 2009 25	VfB Stuttgart	2–0	Hertha BSC	Stuttgart
15:30	Cacau 47'; Khedira 51'			Stadium: Mercedes-Benz Arena; Attendance: 51,000; Referee: Thorsten Kinhöfer

4 April 2009 26	VfL Bochum	1–2	VfB Stuttgart	Bochum
15:30	Epalle 48'		Cacau 58'; Tasci 90'	Stadium: Ruhrstadion; Attendance: 24,718; Referee: Helmut Fleischer

12 April 2009 27	VfB Stuttgart	1–0	Hamburger SV	Stuttgart
17:00	Gómez 90+2'			Stadium: Mercedes-Benz Arena; Attendance: 55,700; Referee: Wolfgang Stark

18 April 2009 28	1. FC Köln	0–3	VfB Stuttgart	Cologne
15:30			Gómez 16', 55', 71'	Stadium: RheinEnergieStadion; Attendance: 50,997; Referee: Peter Gagelmann

25 April 2009 29	VfB Stuttgart	2–0	Eintracht Frankfurt	Stuttgart
15:30	Cacau 33'; Gómez 48'			Stadium: Mercedes-Benz Arena; Attendance: 55,000; Referee: Guido Winkmann

2 May 2009 30	Arminia Bielefeld	2–2	VfB Stuttgart	Bielefeld
15:30	Katongo 30'; Munteanu 68'		Matthieu Delpierre 4'; Thomas Hitzlsperger 35'	Stadium: Bielefelder Alm; Attendance: 25,800; Referee: Felix Brych

9 May 2009 31	VfB Stuttgart	4–1	VfL Wolfsburg	Stuttgart
15:30	Gómez 1', 20', 63', 76'		Džeko 36'	Stadium: Mercedes-Benz Arena; Attendance: 55,896; Referee: Thorsten Kinhöfer

13 May 2009 32	Schalke 04	1–2	VfB Stuttgart	Gelsenkirchen
20:00	Ivan Rakitic 39'		Cacau 15'; Marica 56'	Stadium: Veltins-Arena; Attendance: 61,673; Referee: Michael Kempter

16 May 2009 33	VfB Stuttgart	2–0	Energie Cottbus	Stuttgart
15:30	Hitzlsperger 19'; Cacau 78'			Stadium: Mercedes-Benz Arena; Attendance: 55,000; Referee: Denis Aytekin

23 May 2009 34	Bayern Munich	2–1	VfB Stuttgart	Munich
15:30	Boulahrouz 16' (o.g.); Van Bommel 60'		Gómez 63'	Stadium: Allianz Arena; Attendance: 69,000; Referee: Florian Meyer

== DFB-Pokal ==
10 August 2008 First round	FC Hansa Lüneburg	0–5	VfB Stuttgart	Lüneburg
17:30 CEST		Report	Lanig 11'; Hilbert 27'; Gómez 57', 78'; Berger 83' (o.g.)	Stadium: Wilschenbruch; Attendance: 8,500; Referee: Felix Zwayer

24 September 2008 Second round	VfB Stuttgart	2–0	Arminia Bielefeld	Stuttgart
20:30 CEST	Cacau 17'; Marica 65'	Report		Stadium: Mercedes-Benz Arena; Attendance: 8,500; Referee: Günter Perl

27 January 2009 Round of 16	VfB Stuttgart	1–5	Bayern Munich	Stuttgart
20:30 CET	Gómez 85'	Report	Schweinsteiger 14', 55' (pen.); Ribéry 16'; Toni 43'; Zé Roberto 59'	Stadium: Mercedes-Benz Arena; Attendance: 55,500; Referee: Herbert Fandel

== Statistics ==
=== Top scorers ===
- (Germany) Mario Gómez 24
- (Brazil) Cacau 7
- (Germany) Thomas Hitzlsperger 5
- (Germany) Sami Khedira 5
- (Romania) Ciprian Marica 4
