= 2006–07 VfB Stuttgart season =

VfB Stuttgart
2006–07 season
- Manager: Armin Veh
- Stadium: Gottlieb-Daimler-Stadion, Stuttgart, Baden-Württemberg
- Bundesliga: 1st
- DFB-Pokal: Runners-up
- Top goalscorer: League: Mario Gómez (14); All: Cacau (18)
Home colours	Away colours	Third colours

The 2006–07 VfB Stuttgart season was 42nd season in the Bundesliga.

== Players ==
=== First-team squad ===
Squad at end of season

Note: Flags indicate national team as defined under FIFA eligibility rules; some limited exceptions apply. Players may hold more than one non-FIFA nationality.

No.	Pos.	Nation	Player
1	GK	GER	Timo Hildebrand
2	DF	GER	Andreas Beck (Note: Beck was born in Kemerovo, Soviet Union (now Russia), but was raised in Germany from the age of 3 and represented Germany at U-18, U-19, U-20 and U-21 level before making his international debut for Germany in February 2009.)
3	DF	MEX	Ricardo Osorio
5	DF	GER	Markus Babbel
6	DF	POR	Fernando Meira (captain)
8	MF	GER	Daniel Bierofka
9	FW	SUI	Marco Streller
11	MF	GER	Thomas Hitzlsperger
12	DF	GER	Heiko Gerber
13	MF	MEX	Pável Pardo (vice-captain)
14	MF	SWE	Alexander Farnerud
15	DF	CIV	Arthur Boka
16	FW	GER	Benjamin Lauth (on loan from Hamburger SV)
17	DF	FRA	Matthieu Delpierre

No.	Pos.	Nation	Player
18	FW	BRA	Cacau (Note: Cacau was born in Santo André, Brazil, but also qualified to represent Germany internationally after gaining citizenship and made his international debut for Germany in May 2009.)
19	MF	GER	Roberto Hilbert
21	DF	SUI	Ludovic Magnin
22	MF	GER	Christian Gentner
23	GK	GER	Dirk Heinen
23	FW	GER	Manuel Fischer
25	MF	BRA	Antônio da Silva
26	DF	GER	Tobias Feisthammel
27	MF	GER	Tobias Weis
28	MF	GER	Sami Khedira
30	MF	GER	José-Alex Ikeng (Note: Ikeng was born in Bafia, Cameroon, but also qualified to represent Germany internationally and represented Germany at U-18 level.)
33	FW	GER	Mario Gómez
35	DF	GER	Serdar Tasci
41	GK	AUT	Michael Langer

=== Left club during season ===
Note: Flags indicate national team as defined under FIFA eligibility rules; some limited exceptions apply. Players may hold more than one non-FIFA nationality.

No.	Pos.	Nation	Player
4	DF	CRO	Boris Živković (Note: Živković was born in Živinice, SFR Yugoslavia (now Bosnia and Herzegovina), but also qualified to represent Croatia internationally and made his debut for Croatia in 1999.) (to Hajduk Split)
7	MF	GER	Silvio Meißner (on loan to 1. FC Kaiserslautern)
10	FW	DEN	Jon Dahl Tomasson (on loan to Villarreal)

No.	Pos.	Nation	Player
24	FW	GER	Bernd Nehrig (on loan to SpVgg Unterhaching)
31	GK	GER	Alexander Stolz (on loan to 1899 Hoffenheim)
38	FW	SRB	Danijel Ljuboja (Note: Ljuboja was born in Vinkovci, SFR Yugoslavia (now Croatia), but also qualified to represent Serbia and Montenegro and its successor state Serbia internationally through his parents and made his international debut for Serbia and Montenegro in 2003.) (on loan to Hamburger SV)

=== Reserve team ===
VfB Stuttgart II were coached by Rainer Adrion. They finished 3rd in the Regionalliga Süd.

Note: Flags indicate national team as defined under FIFA eligibility rules; some limited exceptions apply. Players may hold more than one non-FIFA nationality.

No.	Pos.	Nation	Player
—	GK	GER	Denis Baum
—	GK	GER	Timo Hammel
—	GK	AUT	Michael Langer
—	GK	GER	Sven Ulreich
—	DF	GER	Andreas Beck
—	DF	GER	Steffen Dangelmayr
—	DF	GER	Marco Pischorn
—	DF	GER	David Pisot
—	DF	GER	Raphael Schaschko (to January)
—	DF	GER	Joachim Schwabe
—	DF	GER	Marcel Schuon
—	DF	GER	Justus Six
—	MF	GER	Martin Dausch
—	MF	GER	Sebastian Hofmann
—	MF	GER	Patrick Leschinski

No.	Pos.	Nation	Player
—	MF	GER	José-Alex Ikeng
—	MF	GER	Michael Klauß
—	MF	GER	Marijan Kovačević
—	MF	GER	Peter Perchtold
—	MF	GER	Christian Sauter
—	MF	GER	Julian Schuster
—	MF	GER	Tobias Weis
—	FW	GER	Manuel Fischer
—	FW	GER	Danny Galm
—	FW	GER	Martin Hess
—	FW	GER	Patrick Mayer
—	FW	POL	Matthias Morys
—	FW	GER	Bernd Nehrig (to January)
—	FW	HUN	Ádám Szalai

== Statistics ==
=== Appearances and goals ===
No.	Pos	Nat	Player	Total		Bundesliga		DFB-Pokal	
No.	Pos	Nat	Player	Apps	Goals	Apps	Goals	Apps	Goals
Goalkeepers
1	GK	(Germany) GER	Timo Hildebrand	39	0	33	0	6	0
31	GK	(Germany) GER	Alexander Stolz	0	0	0	0	0	0
41	GK	(Austria) AUT	Michael Langer	1	0	1	0	0	0
Defenders
2	DF	(Germany) GER	Andreas Beck	5	0	0+4	0	0+1	0
3	DF	(Mexico) MEX	Ricardo Osorio	33	1	26+1	1	5+1	0
5	DF	(Germany) GER	Markus Babbel	2	0	1+1	0	0	0
6	DF	(Portugal) POR	Fernando Meira	24	3	19+1	3	3+1	0
12	DF	(Germany) GER	Heiko Gerber	0	0	0	0	0	0
15	DF	(Ivory Coast) CIV	Arthur Boka	22	1	16+3	1	2+1	0
17	DF	(France) FRA	Matthieu Delpierre	39	1	33	0	6	1
21	DF	(Switzerland) SUI	Ludovic Magnin	27	1	19+3	1	4+1	0
26	DF	(Germany) GER	Tobias Feisthammel	0	0	0	0	0	0
35	DF	(Germany) GER	Serdar Tasci	31	2	22+4	2	4+1	0
Midfielders
7	MF	(Germany) GER	Silvio Meißner	3	0	0+1	0	0+2	0
8	MF	(Germany) GER	Daniel Bierofka	15	1	5+7	0	2+1	1
11	MF	(Germany) GER	Thomas Hitzlsperger	35	10	25+5	7	4+1	3
13	MF	(Mexico) MEX	Pável Pardo	40	2	33+1	1	6	1
14	MF	(Sweden) SWE	Alexander Farnerud	9	0	4+5	0	0	0
19	MF	(Germany) GER	Roberto Hilbert	39	9	31+3	7	5	2
22	MF	(Germany) GER	Christian Gentner	16	0	3+12	0	0+1	0
25	MF	(Brazil) BRA	Antônio da Silva	32	1	20+8	0	4	1
27	MF	(Germany) GER	Tobias Weis	0	0	0	0	0	0
28	MF	(Germany) GER	Sami Khedira	26	4	16+6	4	4	0
Forwards
9	FW	(Switzerland) SUI	Marco Streller	29	5	7+19	5	1+2	0
10	FW	(Denmark) DEN	Jon Dahl Tomasson	6	1	2+2	0	2	1
16	FW	(Germany) GER	Benjamin Lauth	13	1	5+6	1	0+2	0
18	FW	(Brazil) BRA	Cacau	38	18	31+1	13	5+1	5
24	FW	(Germany) GER	Bernd Nehrig	1	0	0+1	0	0	0
33	FW	(Germany) GER	Mario Gómez	32	16	22+5	14	3+2	2

== Club ==
=== Management ===
Position	Staff
Manager	(Germany) Armin Veh
Assistant manager	(Germany) Alfons Higl

Source: VfB.de

=== Other information ===
Chairman	(Germany) Erwin Staudt
Ground (capacity and dimensions)	Gottlieb-Daimler-Stadion (55,896 / )

Source: VfB.de

== Bundesliga ==
=== Classification ===
Pos	Team	Pld	W	D	L	GF	GA	GD	Pts	Qualification or relegation
1	VfB Stuttgart (C)	34	21	7	6	61	37	+24	70	Qualification to Champions League group stage
2	Schalke 04	34	21	5	8	53	32	+21	68	Qualification to Champions League group stage
3	Werder Bremen	34	20	6	8	76	40	+36	66	Qualification to Champions League third qualifying round
4	Bayern Munich	34	18	6	10	55	40	+15	60	Qualification to UEFA Cup first round (Note: Since 1. FC Nürnberg won the 2006–07 DFB-Pokal, thus qualifying for the UEFA Cup first round, Hamburger SV entered the Intertoto Cup third round.)
5	Bayer Leverkusen	34	15	6	13	54	49	+5	51	Qualification to UEFA Cup first round

Source: kicker.de
Rules for classification: 1) Points; 2) Goal difference; 3) Goals scored
(C) Champions

=== Results ===
12 August 2006 1	VfB Stuttgart	0–3	Nürnberg	Stuttgart
15:30			Vittek 37'; Schroth 45'; Saenko 78'	Stadium: Gottlieb-Daimler-Stadion; Attendance: 39,000; Referee: Florian Meyer

20 August 2006 2	Arminia Bielefeld	2–3	VfB Stuttgart	Bielefeld
17:00	Abdelaziz Ahanfouf 65' (pen.); Jörg Böhme 39'		Meira 39', Cacau 73', 82'	Stadium: Schüco Arena; Attendance: 22,095; Referee: Manuel Gräfe

26 August 2006 3	VfB Stuttgart	1–3	Borussia Dortmund	Stuttgart
15:30	Tasci 30'		Magnin 20' (o.g.); Kringe 32'; Frei 88'	Stadium: Gottlieb-Daimler-Stadion; Attendance: 44,000; Referee: Franz–Xaver Wack

16 September 2006 4	Werder Bremen	2–3	VfB Stuttgart	Bremen
15:30	Hilbert 4' (o.g.); Zidan 33'		Hilbert 38'; Pável Pardo 58'; Gomez 87'	Stadium: Weserstadion; Attendance: 39,654; Referee: Markus Merk

23 September 2006 5	VfB Stuttgart	1–1	Eintracht Frankfurt	Stuttgart
15:30	Gómez 73'		Meier 87'	Stadium: Gottlieb-Daimler-Stadion; Attendance: 41,000; Referee: Babak Rafati

1 October 2006 6	Hertha BSC	2–2	VfB Stuttgart	Berlin
17:00	Friedrich 9'; Pantelic 14'		Gómez 4'; Cacau 57'	Stadium: Olympiastadion; Attendance: 48,637; Referee: Thorsten Kinhöfer

14 October 2006 7	VfB Stuttgart	3–0	Bayer Leverkusen	Stuttgart
15:30	Gómez 22'; Boka 48'; Hitzlsperger 76'			Stadium: Gottlieb-Daimler-Stadion; Attendance: 35,000; Referee: Peter Gagelmann

21 October 2006 8	Wolfsburg	1–1	VfB Stuttgart	Wolfsburg
15:30	Hanke 26'		Gómez 31'	Stadium: Volkswagen Arena; Attendance: 21,927; Referee: Lutz Wagner

29 October 2006 9	VfB Stuttgart	3–0	Schalke 04	Stuttgart
17:00	Khedira 32', 46'; Tasci 75'			Stadium: Gottlieb-Daimler-Stadion; Attendance: 53,000; Referee: Wolfgang Stark

4 November 2006 10	Alemannia Aachen	2–4	VfB Stuttgart	Aachen
15:30	Rösler 28'; Ibisevic 86'		Gómez 24'; Hitzlsperger 26'; Streller 46', 63'	Stadium: Tivoli; Attendance: 20,300; Referee: Felix Brych

7 November 2006 11	VfB Stuttgart	2–0	Hamburger SV	Stuttgart
20:00	Gómez 80'; Hitzlsperger 85'			Stadium: Gottlieb-Daimler-Stadion; Attendance: 37,000; Referee: Herbert Fandel

12 November 2006 12	Hannover 96	1–2	VfB Stuttgart	Hanover
17:00	Rosenthal 13'		Hitzlsperger 49'; Cacau 54'	Stadium: AWD–Arena; Attendance: 28,847; Referee: Jochen Drees

18 November 2006 13	Bayern Munich	2–1	VfB Stuttgart	Munich
15:30	Makaay 27'; Pizarro 36'		Gómez 8'	Stadium: Allianz Arena; Attendance: 69,000; Referee: Michael Wiener

26 November 2006 14	VfB Stuttgart	1–0	Borussia Mönchengladbach	Stuttgart
18:00	Cacau 5'			Stadium: Gottlieb-Daimler-Stadion; Attendance: 53,000; Referee: Helmut Fleischer

1 December 2006 15	Mainz 05	0–0	VfB Stuttgart	Mainz
20:30				Stadium: Stadion am Bruchweg; Attendance: 20,300; Referee: Babak Rafati

9 December 2006 16	VfB Stuttgart	1–0	VfL Bochum	Stuttgart
15:30	Marco Streller 87'			Stadium: Gottlieb-Daimler-Stadion; Attendance: 48,000; Referee: Markus Merk

16 December 2006 17	Energie Cottbus	0–0	VfB Stuttgart	Cottbus
15:30				Stadium: Stadion der Freundschaft; Attendance: 13,650; Referee: Felix Brych

27 January 2007 18	Nürnberg	4–1	VfB Stuttgart	Nuremberg
15:30	Saenko 26'; Gresko 51'; Schroth 70'; Magnin 77' (o.g.)		Cacau 33'	Stadium: Easy Credit Stadion; Attendance: 35,082; Referee: Herbert Fandel

30 January 2007 19	VfB Stuttgart	3–2	Arminia Bielefeld	Stuttgart
20:00	Gómez 9', 59'; Cacau 53'		Eigler 26'; Ahanfouf 87'	Stadium: Gottlieb-Daimler-Stadion; Attendance: 23,000; Referee: Peter Gagelmann

4 February 2007 20	Borussia Dortmund	0–1	VfB Stuttgart	Dortmund
17:00			Gómez 59'	Stadium: Westfalenstadion; Attendance: 63,600; Referee: Markus Merk

10 February 2007 21	VfB Stuttgart	4–1	Werder Bremen	Stuttgart
15:30	Hilbert 3'; Gómez 15'; Magnin; 33'; Streller 86'		Diego 21'	Stadium: Gottlieb-Daimler-Stadion; Attendance: 57,000; Referee: Manuel Gräfe

16 February 2007 22	Eintracht Frankfurt	0–4	VfB Stuttgart	Frankfurt
20:30			Hilbert 2'; Gómez 16'; Osorio 44'; Hitzlsperger 78'	Stadium: Commerzbank-Arena; Attendance: 46,000; Referee: Wolfgang Stark

23 February 2007 23	VfB Stuttgart	0–0	Hertha BSC	Stuttgart
20:30				Stadium: Gottlieb-Daimler-Stadion; Attendance: 45,000; Referee: Florian Meyer

3 March 2007 24	Bayer Leverkusen	3–1	VfB Stuttgart	Leverkusen
15:30	Voronin 19'; Freier 22'; Juan 61'		Cacau 73'	Stadium: BayArena; Attendance: 22,500; Referee: Felix Brych

10 March 2007 25	VfB Stuttgart	0–0	VfL Wolfsburg	Stuttgart
15:30				Stadium: Gottlieb-Daimler-Stadion; Attendance: 44,000; Referee: Wolfgang Stark

17 March 2007 26	Schalke 04	1–0	VfB Stuttgart	Gelsenkirchen
15:30	Krstajic 76'			Stadium: Veltins-Arena; Attendance: 61,482; Referee: Helmut Fleischer

31 March 2007 27	VfB Stuttgart	3–1	Alemannia Aachen	Stuttgart
15:30	Streller 29'; Lauth 75'; Cacau 84'		Sichone 59'	Stadium: Gottlieb-Daimler-Stadion; Attendance: 43,000; Referee: Markus Merk

7 April 2007 28	Hamburger SV	2–4	VfB Stuttgart	Hamburg
15:30	Jarolim 66'; Olic 75'		Cacau 10'; Khedira 13'; Hilbert 27'; Meira 51'	Stadium: HSH Nordbank Arena; Attendance: 57,000; Referee: Lutz Wagner

14 April 2007 29	VfB Stuttgart	2–1	Hannover 96	Stuttgart
15:30	Hilbert 2'; Zuraw 74' (o.g.)		Cherundolo 60'	Stadium: Gottlieb-Daimler-Stadion; Attendance: 53,000; Referee: Marc Seemann

21 April 2007 30	VfB Stuttgart	2–0	Bayern Munich	Stuttgart
15:30	Cacau 24', 25'			Stadium: Gottlieb-Daimler-Stadion; Attendance: 57,400; Referee: Markus Merk

28 April 2007 31	Borussia Mönchengladbach	0–1	VfB Stuttgart	Mönchengladbach
15:30			Hilbert 53'	Stadium: Borussia–Park; Attendance: 45,000; Referee: Herbert Fandel

5 May 2007 32	VfB Stuttgart	2–0	Mainz 05	Stuttgart
15:30	Meira 26'; Hilbert 64'			Stadium: Gottlieb-Daimler-Stadion; Attendance: 56,000; Referee: Manuel Gräfe

12 May 2007 33	VfL Bochum	2–3	VfB Stuttgart	Bochum
15:30	Schröder 4'; Maltritz 42'		Hitzlsperger 24'; Gómez 62'; Cacau 73'	Stadium: Ruhrstadion; Attendance: 31,328; Referee: Florian Meyer

19 May 2007 34	VfB Stuttgart	2–1	Energie Cottbus	Stuttgart
15:30	Hitzlsperger 27'; Khedira 63'		Sergiu Radu 19'	Stadium: Gottlieb-Daimler-Stadion; Attendance: 56,000; Referee: Wolfgang Stark
