= 2011–12 Hertha BSC season =

Hertha BSC
2011–12 season
- President: Werner Gegenbauer
- Manager: Markus Babbel (until 18 December); Michael Skibbe (22 December – 12 February); Otto Rehhagel (from 18 February)
- Bundesliga: 16th (relegated)
- DFB-Pokal: Quarter-finals
- Top goalscorer: League: Pierre-Michel Lasogga (8 goals); All: Pierre-Michel Lasogga (10 goals)
- Highest home attendance: 74,244 vs. Borussia Dortmund; 74,244 vs. Bayern Munich
- Lowest home attendance: 36,997 vs. Hannover 96
- Average home league attendance: 53,449
Home colours	Away colours	Third colours

The 2011–12 season of Hertha BSC began on 31 July 2011 with a DFB-Pokal match against ZFC Meuselwitz, and ended on 15 May 2012 with the second leg of the Bundesliga relegation play-offs. For the first time since 2006–07, Hertha made it past the 2nd round of the DFB-Pokal, making it as far as the quarterfinals before losing to Borussia Mönchengladbach. In the Bundesliga, Hertha finished 16th, qualifying for the relegation play-off.

== Review and events ==
=== Overview of season ===
On 18 December, Hertha BSC fired head coach Markus Babbel after a disagreement with Michael Preetz. Preetz fired Babbel because there is no trust and so the club can "avert damage". Babbel he told Preetz that he would not sign a contract extension during the November international break while Preetz claim Babbel told him on 13 December. Babbel responded to Pretz's claim by stating that "when someone has another opinion, then maybe he wasn't listening properly". On 22 December, Michael Skibbe was named Babbel's replacement. On 12 February, Hertha BSC fired Skibbe after losing all 5 matches in charge. Otto Rehhagel was appointed as the clubs new manager on 18 February, on a deal until the end of the season.

=== Hertha BSC vs. Fortuna Düsseldorf ===
==== The matches ====
Fortuna Düsseldorf won a spot in the promotion/relegation playoff against first division side Hertha BSC.

===== First leg =====
Going into the playoff, Fortuna Düsseldorf hadn't been in the top flight for 15 seasons. They won the first leg against Hertha BSC 1:2 in Berlin's Olympic Stadium from goals from Thomas Bröker and an own goal from Hertha BSC's Adrián Ramos.

===== Second leg =====
In the return leg in Düsseldorf, North Rhine-Westphalia, both teams drew 2-2. Fortuna Düsseldorf won on aggregate 4–3. However, the second half was marred by trouble. Hertha BSC supporter threw flares onto the field. Hertha BSC supporters did this after Fortuna Düsseldorf scored their second goal of the night to lead 2–1. The other problem of the night was when several Fortuna Düsseldorf supporters ran onto the field with about a minute left. It took 21 minutes to restore order and stoppage time ended up being 28 minutes by the time the final whistle blew. With Fortuna Düsseldorf winning the 2 legged affair, they returned to the Bundesliga after 15 seasons.

==== The appeal ====
Hertha BSC appealed the result of the match. The German Football Association will be meeting on 18 May 2012 to discuss the incidents of the second leg. Campino, singer for Die Toten Hosen, called Hertha BSC's protest "indecent". The hearing at the German Football Association last for six hours. The panel's decision will not be known until a further meeting on Monday. It is expected to make a decision at 15:00 CET. The German Football Association stated that any possible disciplinary action against either club or any of the players will be taken at a later date. The players being investigated are Levan Kobiashvili, Christian Lell, Thomas Kraft and Andre Mijatović. 2nd leg referee Wolfgang Stark was a key witness at the first hearing at the German Football Association.

Sports law expert Michael Lehner said that Hertha BSC can hope for replay after the second leg of the promotion/relegation playoff. Lehner went on to state, "Is not the game has been properly placed on the principle of equal opportunity at the end there was a break in terms of game development" and "The team of Hertha BSC through the fault of third parties a real opportunity has been deprived of the game even. get why there should be a replay from a legal point of view".

The sports court of the German Football Association rejected the appeal of Hertha BSC. Hertha BSC will pay the cost of the proceedings. Hertha BSC appealed the decision of the German Football Association's sports court. The sports German Football Association court president Hans Eberhard Lorenz stated, "The appeal was unsuccessful, because no ground of opposition was to prove the referee has traded at any time conform to the rules, and the alleged Hertha BSC-sided weakness due to the interruption could not be proven.." He also stated that "There was no Berlin players injured or assaulted or were needed to be replaced. Had this been the case, the objection would have been done." The Federal Court of the German Football Association confirmed the Sports Court decision. Hertha BSC can appeal the decision to the Sports Court for Arbitration. After the final verdict, Hertha BSC players went on vacation while Fortuna Düsseldorf players were not immediately released for vacation.

The disciplinary panel of the German Football Association decided that Fortuna Düsseldorf must play their first home match of next season with no fans for the fans running onto the field during the 2nd leg of the promotion/relegation playoff. The club was also hit with a six figure fine.

==== Other incidents ====
Another incident reported by Die Welt the next day was that Hertha BSC players attacked second leg referee Wolfgang Stark. Stark pressed charges against an unknown player for assaulting him off the field. Hertha BSC have apologized for the conduct of some of the club's players. The four players are accused of verbally and physically harassing the referee. The German Football Association (DFB) handed down suspensions for Levan Kobiashvili, who was banned for a year, Christian Lell, who was banned for six matches, Thomas Kraft, who was banned for five matches and Andre Mijatović, who was banned for four matches. Kobiashvili's suspension was reduced to seven and a half months and Lell's ban was eventually reduced to 5 matches.

== Match results ==
=== Legend ===
Win Draw Loss

=== Bundesliga ===
Note: Results are given with Hertha BSC score listed first.

Game	Date	Venue	Opponent	Result F–A	Attendance	Hertha BSC Goalscorers
1	6 August 2011	Olympiastadion, Berlin	1. FC Nürnberg	0–1	61,118
2	13 August 2011	Imtech Arena, Hamburg	Hamburger SV	2–2	52,100	Torun 43', Mijatović 88'
3	21 August 2011	AWD-Arena, Hannover	Hannover 96	1–1	41,200	Lasogga 83'
4	26 August 2011	Olympiastadion, Berlin	VfB Stuttgart	1–0	52,232	Raffael 86'
5	10 September 2011	Signal Iduna Park, Dortmund	Borussia Dortmund	2–1	80,720	Raffael 50', Niemeyer 81'
6	17 September 2011	Olympiastadion, Berlin	FC Augsburg	2–2	48,385	Lell 46', Torun 57'
7	25 September 2011	Weserstadion, Bremen	Werder Bremen	1–2	40,760	Ramos 3'
8	1 October 2011	Olympiastadion, Berlin	1. FC Köln	3–0	59,491	Lasogga 14', 26' Raffael 34'
9	15 October 2011	Allianz Arena, Munich	Bayern Munich	0–4	69,000
10	22 October 2011	Olympiastadion, Berlin	Mainz 05	0–0	47,064
11	29 October 2011	Volkswagen Arena, Wolfsburg	VfL Wolfsburg	3–2	30,000	Raffael 27', Kobiashvili 37' (pen.), Lasogga 85'
12	5 November 2011	Olympiastadion, Berlin	Borussia Mönchengladbach	1–2	60,556	Ramos 17'
13	19 November 2011	badenova-Stadion, Freiburg	SC Freiburg	2–2	21,500	Ramos 20' Niemeyer 45'
14	26 November 2011	Olympiastadion, Berlin	Bayer Leverkusen	3–3	44,541	Lasogga 7', 82', Toprak 17' (o.g.)
15	3 December 2011	Fritz-Walter-Stadion, Kaiserslautern	1. FC Kaiserslautern	1–1	36,000	Raffael 14'
16	9 December 2011	Olympiasadion, Berlin	Schalke 04	1–2	52,382	Ramos 25'
17	17 December 2011	Rhein-Neckar-Arena, Sinsheim	1899 Hoffenheim	1–1	28,000	Hubník 90+1'
18	21 January 2012	easyCredit-Stadion, Nuremberg	1. FC Nürnberg	0–2	39,117
19	28 January 2012	Olympiastadion, Berlin	Hamburger SV	1–2	49,168	Lasogga 81'
20	4 February 2012	Olympiastadion, Berlin	Hannover 96	0–1	36,997
21	11 February 2012	Mercedes-Benz Arena, Stuttgart	VfB Stuttgart	0–5	45,000
22	18 February 2012	Olympiastadion, Berlin	Borussia Dortmund	0–1	74,244
23	25 February 2012	SGL arena, Augsburg	FC Augsburg	0–3	29,123
24	3 March 2012	Olympiastadion, Berlin	Werder Bremen	1–0	52,744	Rukavytsya 62'
25	10 March 2012	RheinEnergieStadion, Cologne	1. FC Köln	0–1	48,000
26	17 March 2012	Olympiastadion, Berlin	Bayern Munich	0–6	74,244
27	24 March 2012	Coface Arena, Mainz	Mainz 05	3–1	33,152	Ben-Hatira 41', Ramos 52', 69'
28	31 March 2012	Olympiastadion, Berlin	VfL Wolfsburg	1–4	46,388	Kobiashvili 13'
29	7 April 2012	Borussia Park, Mönchengladbach	Borussia Mönchengladbach	0–0	52,691
30	10 April 2012	Olympiastadion, Berlin	SC Freiburg	1–2	45,778	Hubník 81'
31	14 April 2012	BayArena, Leverkusen	Bayer Leverkusen	3–3	27,000	Lasogga 63', Torun 71', 77'
32	21 April 2012	Olympiastadion, Berlin	1. FC Kaiserslautern	1–2	51,461	Niemeyer 60'
33	28 April 2012	Veltins-Arena, Gelsenkirchen	Schalke 04	0–4
34	5 May 2012	Olympiastadion, Berlin	1899 Hoffenheim	3–1	51,834	Ben-Hatira 14', 78', Raffael 90+2'

==== Relegation play-off ====
As 16th-placed team, Hertha BSC faces the 3rd-placed 2011–12 2. Bundesliga side in a two-legged play-off. The winner on aggregate score after both matches will earn a spot in the 2012–13 Bundesliga.

Dates and times of these matches were determined by the Deutsche Fußball-Liga as following:

10 May 2012
20:30 CEST

Hertha BSC	1 – 2	Fortuna Düsseldorf
Hubník 19'	report	Bröker 64'; Ramos 71' (o.g.)

Olympic Stadium, Berlin
Attendance: 68,041
Referee: Marco Fritz

15 May 2012
20:30 CEST

Fortuna Düsseldorf	2 – 2	Hertha BSC
Beister 1'; Jovanović 59'	report	Ben-Hatira 23'; Raffael 85'

Esprit Arena, Düsseldorf, North Rhine-Westphalia
Attendance: 51,000
Referee: Wolfgang Stark

=== DFB-Pokal ===
Note: Results are given with Hertha BSC score listed first.

Game	Date	Venue	Opponent	Result F–A	Attendance	Hertha BSC Goalscorers
1	31 July 2011	bluechip-Arena, Meuselwitz	ZFC Meuselwitz	4–0	7,707	Ramos 22', 26' Ottl 49' Ebert 56'
2	26 October 2011	Georg-Melches-Stadion, Essen	Rot-Weiss Essen	3–0	14,000	Ramos 64', Lasogga 72', Rukavytsya 86'
3	21 December 2011	Olympiastadion, Berlin	1. FC Kaiserslautern	3–1	40,944	Ramos 44', Lasogga 56', Ebert 90+2'
4	8 February 2012	Olympiastadion, Berlin	Borussia Mönchengladbach	0–2 a.e.t.	47,465

== Player information ==
=== Roster and statistics ===
==== Roster, goals and appearances ====
No.	Pos	Nat	Player	Total		Bundesliga		DFB-Pokal		Relegation play-offs	
No.	Pos	Nat	Player	Apps	Goals	Apps	Goals	Apps	Goals	Apps	Goals
1	GK	(Netherlands) NED	Maikel Aerts	0	0	0	0	0	0	0	0
2	DF	(Germany) GER	Christian Lell	32	1	28	1	2	0	2	0
3	DF	(Georgia (country)) GEO	Levan Kobiashvili	36	2	31	2	3	0	2	0
4	DF	(Czech Republic) CZE	Roman Hubník	32	2	27	1	3	0	2	1
5	DF	(Croatia) CRO	Andre Mijatović	24	1	21	1	2	0	1	0
6	DF	(Germany) GER	Christoph Janker	23	0	18	0	3	0	2	0
7	DF	(Germany) GER	Maik Franz	8	0	7	0	1	0	0	0
8	MF	(Germany) GER	Andreas Ottl	29	1	26	0	3	1	0	0
9	FW	(Colombia) COL	Adrián Ramos	37	9	31	6	4	3	2	0
10	MF	(Brazil) BRA	Raffael	34	7	31	6	1	0	2	1
11	FW	(Turkey) TUR	Tunay Torun	23	4	20	4	2	0	1	0
12	MF	(Brazil) BRA	Ronny	16	0	10	0	4	0	2	0
13	MF	(Australia) AUS	Nikita Rukavytsya	26	2	24	1	1	1	1	0
14	DF	(Germany) GER	Sebastian Neumann	3	0	2	0	1	0	0	0
17	MF	(Tunisia) TUN	Änis Ben-Hatira	21	4	17	3	2	0	2	1
18	MF	(Germany) GER	Peter Niemeyer	37	3	31	3	4	0	2	0
19	FW	(Germany) GER	Pierre-Michel Lasogga	35	10	31	8	4	2	0	0
20	MF	(Germany) GER	Patrick Ebert	33	2	27	0	4	2	2	0
21	GK	(Germany) GER	Sascha Burchert	4	0	2	0	2	0	0	0
22	DF	(Germany) GER	Felix Bastians	15	0	13	0	1	0	1	0
23	MF	(Germany) GER	Fanol Perdedaj	8	0	7	0	0	0	1	0
24	DF	(United States) USA	John Brooks	0	0	0	0	0	0	0	0
25	FW	(Austria) AUT	Marco Djuricin	2	0	2	0	0	0	0	0
26	MF	(Germany) GER	Nico Schulz	0	0	0	0	0	0	0	0
27	DF	(United States) USA	Alfredo Morales	10	0	8	0	2	0	0	0
28	MF	(Switzerland) SUI	Fabian Lustenberger	15	0	12	0	3	0	0	0
32	MF	(Germany) GER	Fabian Holland	3	0	2	0	0	0	1	0
33	FW	(Germany) GER	Abu-Bakarr Kargbo	0	0	0	0	0	0	0	0
35	GK	(Germany) GER	Thomas Kraft	38	0	34	0	2	0	2	0

Last updated:25 May 2012

==== Disciplinary action ====
Disciplinary records for 2011–12 league matches. Players with 1 card or more included only.
Last updated on 5 May 2012

No.	Nat.	Player	Yellow card	(yellow card) (yellow-red card)	Red card
2	(Germany)	Christian Lell	11	1	0
3	(Georgia (country))	Levan Kobiashvili	6	1	1
4	(Czech Republic)	Roman Hubník	4	0	0
5	(Croatia)	Andre Mijatović	7	0	0
7	(Germany)	Maik Franz	3	0	0
8	(Germany)	Andreas Ottl	3	0	1
9	(Colombia)	Adrián Ramos	4	1	0
10	(Brazil)	Raffael	4	0	1
11	(Turkey)	Tunay Torun	3	0	0
14	(Germany)	Sebastian Neumann	2	1	0
17	(Tunisia)	Änis Ben-Hatira	2	0	0
18	(Germany)	Peter Niemeyer	7	1	0
19	(Germany)	Pierre-Michel Lasogga	4	0	0
20	(Germany)	Patrick Ebert	6	0	0
23	(Germany)	Fanol Perdedaj	2	0	0
27	(United States)	Alfredo Morales	3	0	0
35	(Germany)	Thomas Kraft	3	0	0

=== Summer Transfers ===
In:

No.	Pos.	Nation	Player
7	DF	GER	Maik Franz (from Eintracht Frankfurt)
8	MF	GER	Andreas Ottl (from Bayern Munich)
11	FW	TUR	Tunay Torun (from Hamburger SV)
17	MF	GER	Änis Ben-Hatira (from Hamburger SV)
18	MF	GER	Peter Niemeyer (from Werder Bremen, previously on loan)
24	DF	USA	John Brooks (from Hertha BSC II)
33	FW	GER	Abu-Bakarr Kargbo (from Hertha BSC II)
35	GK	GER	Thomas Kraft (from Bayern Munich)

Out:

No.	Pos.	Nation	Player
15	MF	GER	Sascha Bigalke (to SpVgg Unterhaching)
16	FW	CAN	Rob Friend (to Eintracht Frankfurt)
17	FW	BUL	Valeri Domovchiyski (to MSV Duisburg)
25	DF	GER	Lennart Hartmann (to Alemannia Aachen)
27	MF	GER	Marvin Knoll (on loan to Dynamo Dresden)
--	MF	AUT	Daniel Beichler (on loan to MSV Duisburg, previously on loan at FC St. Gallen)
--	DF	BRA	Kaká (on loan to APOEL, previously on loan at Braga)

=== Winter transfers ===
In:

No.	Pos.	Nation	Player
22	DF	GER	Felix Bastians (from SC Freiburg)

Out:

No.	Pos.	Nation	Player

== See also ==
- 2011–12 Bundesliga
- 2011–12 DFB-Pokal
- Hertha BSC
