= Adrion =

Adrion is both a surname and a given name. Notable people with the name include:

- Rainer Adrion (born 1953), German footballer and manager
- Adrion Pajaziti (born 2002), Kosovan footballer
- Adrion Smith (born 1971), American player of Canadian football and announcer

== See also ==
- Adrian
