= Roberto Hilbert =

German footballer (born 1984)

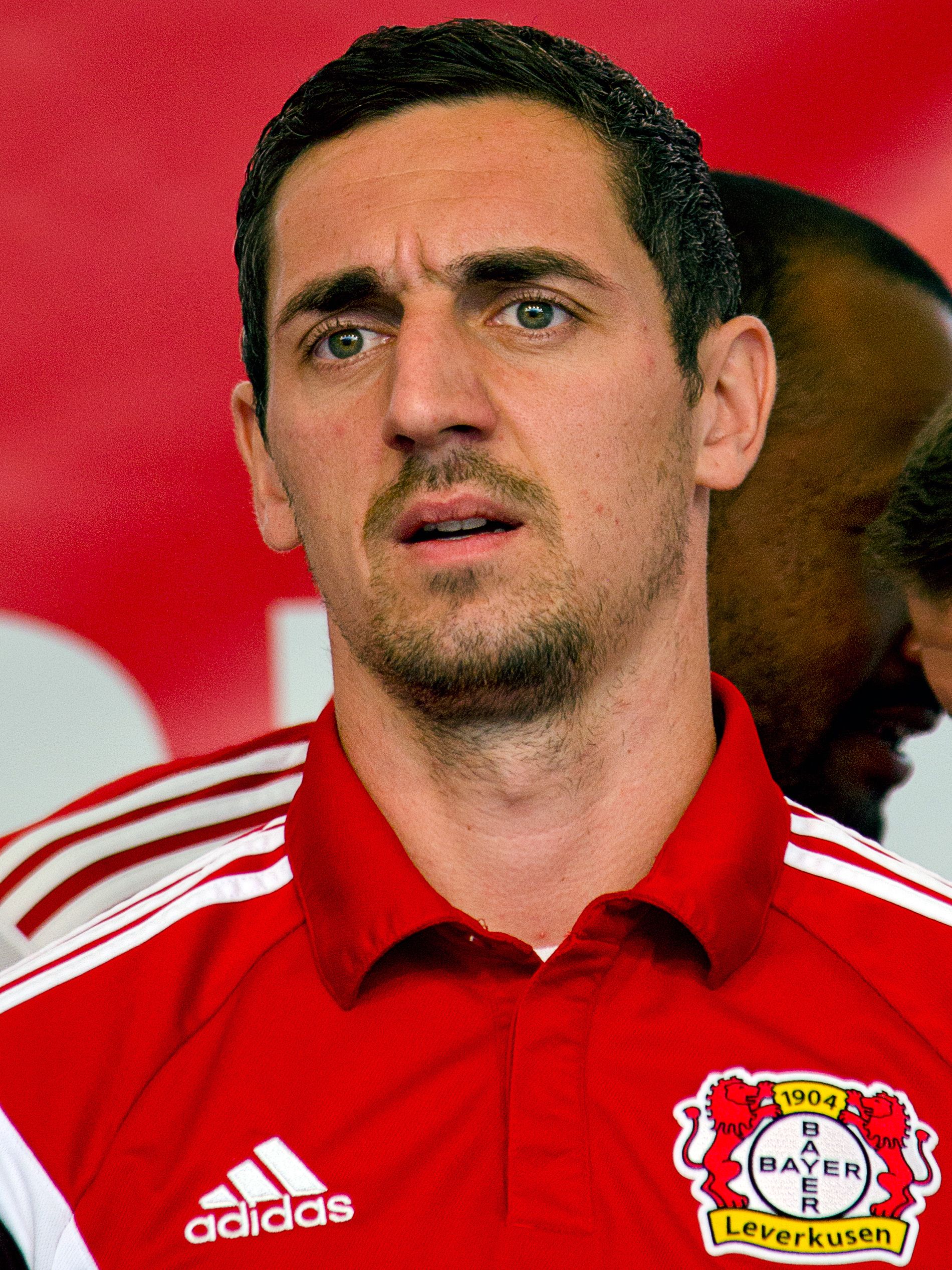
- Hilbert with Bayer Leverkusen in 2014.

Personal information
- Full name: Roberto Jan Hilbert
- Date of birth: 16 October 1984 (age 42)
- Place of birth: Forchheim, West Germany
- Height: 1.82 m (6 ft 0 in)
- Positions: Right back; midfielder

Youth career
- 1990–1993: SpVgg Jahn Forchheim
- 1993–1996: 1. FC Nürnberg
- 1996–1998: SpVgg Jahn Forchheim
- 1998–2000: 1. FC Nürnberg
- 2000–2002: Greuther Fürth

Senior career*
Years	Team	Apps	(Gls)
2002–2004	1. SC Feucht	48	(20)
2004–2006	Greuther Fürth	60	(8)
2006–2010	VfB Stuttgart	120	(16)
2010–2013	Beşiktaş	76	(5)
2013–2017	Bayer Leverkusen	58	(1)
2017–2019	Greuther Fürth	25	(1)
2019	Greuther Fürth II	2	(1)
Total		389	(52)

International career
2005–2006	Germany U21	12	(3)
2007–2008	Germany	8	(0)
- * Club domestic league appearances and goals

Roberto Jan Hilbert (born 16 October 1984) is a German former professional footballer. At international level, he earned eight caps with the Germany national team and twelve caps with the U21 team.

== Club career ==
Born in Forchheim, West Germany, Hilbert played for local club SpVgg Jahn Forchheim In his youth before playing for the youth teams of 1. FC Nürnberg and SpVgg Greuther Fürth. In 2002, he was transferred to 1. SC Feucht in the fourth-tier Bayernliga, where he was one of the key players and started his professional career. After his club was promoted to the third-tier Regionalliga the following season, he scored ten goals in 26 games.

On the basis of this performances at Feucht, Greuther Fürth re-signed him where he played in the 2. Bundesliga. In the 2005–06 season, he played in 34 games, scoring three times.

In the summer of 2006, Hilbert joined top Bundesliga side VfB Stuttgart. In his first season at Stuttgart, he became a regular in the first team which won the club's first championship in 15 years in May 2007. He usually played in right midfield, but is some times used as a right-back. After the injury of key striker Mario Gómez in the final phase of the 2007 championship, Hilbert played a more offensive part for several weeks and scored a number of decisive goals. He finished as Stuttgart's third best goalscorer, scoring seven times, like his teammate Thomas Hitzlsperger.

On 22 June 2010, Hilbert signed a three-year contract with Beşiktaş. He scored his first goal for Beşiktaş against HJK Helsinki in the first leg of UEFA Europa League match on 17 August 2010.

On 12 July 2013, Bayer Leverkusen announced on their homepage that they signed Hilbert on a free transfer. Hilbert was given a two-year contract. At the end of the 2016–17 season, he left the club after four years.

In October 2017, free agent Hilbert joined former club Greuther Fürth for a second stint there, signing a two-year contract.

On 6 January 2019, it was announced that Hilbert finished his active professional career and from now on would play for the reserve team of Greuther Fürth. He was also going to do an apprenticeship as an athletic trainer.

== International career ==
Hilbert has also made twelve appearances in the Germany U21 team, scoring three times. He made his international debut for the Germany national team in a friendly against Denmark on 28 March 2007.

== Career statistics ==
=== Club ===
Appearances and goals by club, season and competition
Club	Season	League			National cup (Note: Includes DFB-Pokal, Turkish Cup)		Europe		Other		Total	
Club	Season	Division	Apps	Goals	Apps	Goals	Apps	Goals	Apps	Goals	Apps	Goals
1. SC Feucht	2003–04	Regionalliga Süd	26	11	—		—		—		26	11
Greuther Fürth	2004–05	2. Bundesliga	26	5	2	0	—		—		28	5
Greuther Fürth	2005–06	2. Bundesliga	34	3	1	0	—		—		35	3
Greuther Fürth	Total		60	8	3	0	0	0	0	0	63	8
VfB Stuttgart	2006–07	Bundesliga	34	7	5	2	—		—		39	9
VfB Stuttgart	2007–08	Bundesliga	32	4	3	2	5 (Note: Appearances in UEFA Champions League)	0	1 (Note: Appearance in DFL-Ligapokal)	0	41	6
VfB Stuttgart	2008–09	Bundesliga	31	3	3	1	11 (Note: Appearances in UEFA Cup)	1	—		45	5
VfB Stuttgart	2009–10	Bundesliga	23	2	2	0	3	0	—		28	2
VfB Stuttgart	Total		120	16	13	5	19	1	1	0	153	22
Beşiktaş	2010–11	Süper Lig	25	1	9	1	11 (Note: Appearances in UEFA Europa League)	1	—		45	3
Beşiktaş	2011–12	Süper Lig	19	1	1	0	5	1	5	0	30	2
Beşiktaş	2012–13	Süper Lig	32	3	3	1	0	0	—		35	4
Beşiktaş	Total		76	5	13	2	16	2	5	0	110	9
Bayer Leverkusen	2013–14	Bundesliga	16	1	1	0	2	0	—		19	1
Bayer Leverkusen	2014–15	Bundesliga	23	0	3	0	4	0	—		30	0
Bayer Leverkusen	2015–16	Bundesliga	12	0	2	0	6	0	—		20	0
Bayer Leverkusen	2016–17	Bundesliga	7	0	1	0	1	0	—		9	0
Bayer Leverkusen	Total		58	1	7	0	13	0	0	0	78	1
Greuther Fürth	2017–18	2. Bundesliga	22	1	0	0	—		—		22	1
Greuther Fürth	2018–19	2. Bundesliga	3	0	1	0	—		—		4	0
Greuther Fürth	Total		25	1	1	0	0	0	0	0	26	1
Greuther Fürth II	2017–18	Regionalliga Bayern	2	1	–		—		—		2	1
Career total			367	43	37	7	48	3	6	0	458	53

== Honours ==
VfB Stuttgart

- Bundesliga: 2006–07

Beşiktaş

- Turkish Cup: 2010–11
