= Gledson (footballer, born 1979) =

Brazilian footballer

Personal information
- Full name: Gledson da Silva Menezes
- Date of birth: 4 September 1979 (age 47)
- Place of birth: Felipe Guerra, Brazil
- Height: 1.90 m (6 ft 3 in)
- Position: Defender

Youth career
- ABC Natal
- Corinthians Sao Paulo
- AD Vitoria

Senior career*
Years	Team	Apps	(Gls)
2000–2001	FC Tubarão-SC		
2002	Fortuna Köln	13	(0)
2002–2005	LR Ahlen	28	(1)
2003–2004	→ VfL Osnabrück (loan)	27	(1)
2005–2007	Hansa Rostock	50	(6)
2007	VfB Stuttgart	0	(0)
2008–2009	Hansa Rostock	26	(1)
2009–2013	FSV Frankfurt	78	(2)
Total		222	(11)
- * Club domestic league appearances and goals

Gledson da Silva Menezes (born 4 September 1979), known as Gledson, is a Brazilian former professional footballer who played as a defender.

== Career ==
Gledson was born in Felipe Guerra, Rio Grande do Norte.

He moved to reigning Bundesliga champions VfB Stuttgart from F.C. Hansa Rostock during the summer of 2007, having made 105 appearances in the 2. Bundesliga over the past three seasons.

On 3 January 2008, he returned to Hansa Rostock.

On 14 July 2009, he signed for FSV Frankfurt.
