= Alexander Stolz =

German footballer (born 1983)

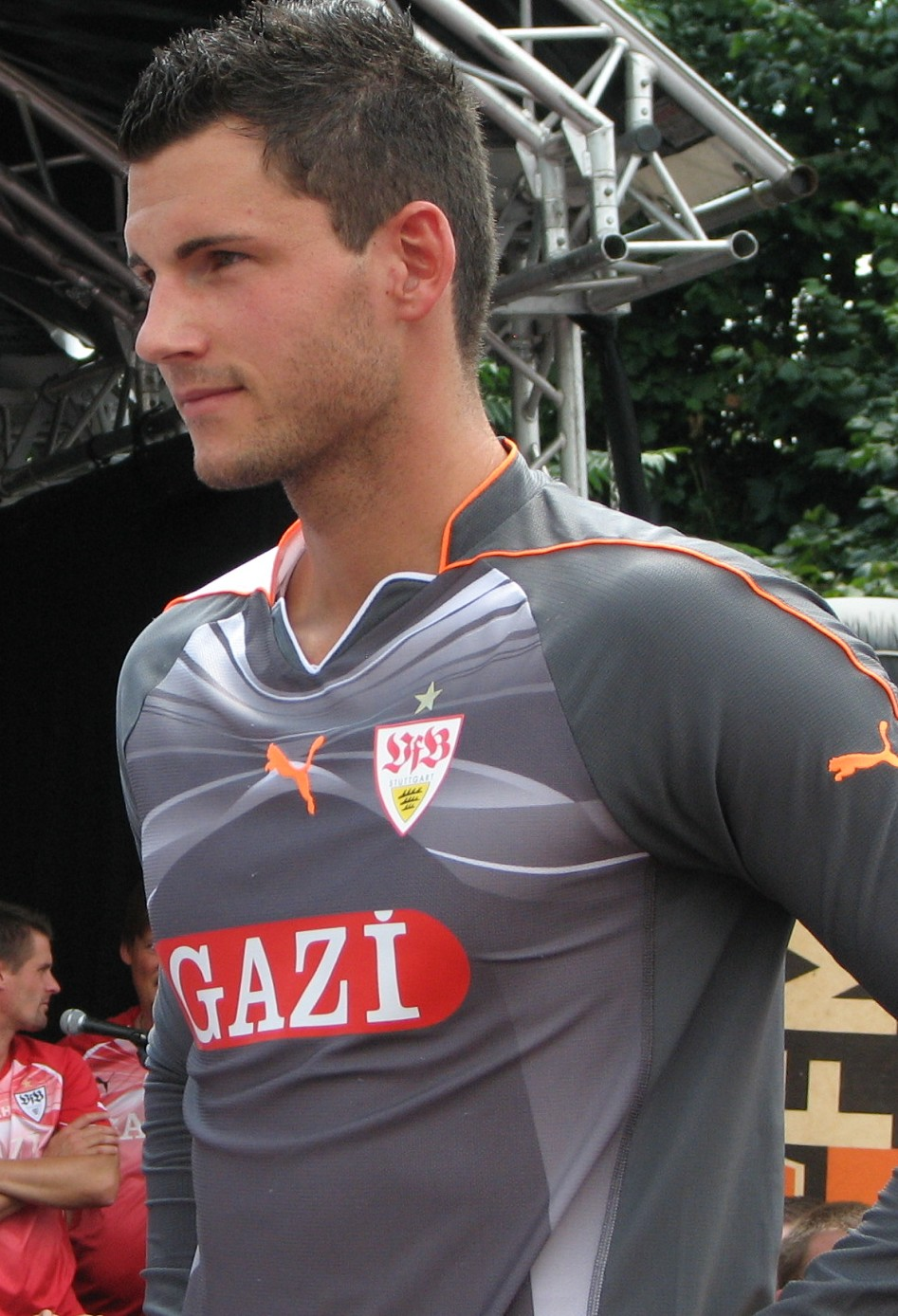
- Stolz in 2010

Personal information
- Date of birth: 13 October 1983 (age 43)
- Place of birth: Pforzheim, West Germany
- Height: 1.89 m (6 ft 2 in)
- Position: Goalkeeper

Youth career
- SV Hohenwart
- Stuttgarter Kickers
- –2003: VfR Pforzheim
- 2003–2004: SV Sandhausen

Senior career*
| Years | Team | Apps | (Gls) |
| 2004–2005 | FC Nöttingen | 18 | (0) |
| 2005–2012 | VfB Stuttgart II | 19 | (0) |
| 2005–2012 | VfB Stuttgart | 0 | (0) |
| 2006–2007 | → 1899 Hoffenheim (loan) | 2 | (0) |
| 2012 | Karlsruher SC | 0 | (0) |
| 2013–2020 | TSG Hoffenheim II | 28 | (0) |
| 2013–2020 | TSG Hoffenheim | 1 | (0) |
| Total | | 68 | (0) |

Managerial career
- 2020: TSG Hoffenheim (youth goalkeeper coach)
- 2020–2023: TSG Hoffenheim II (goalkeeper coach)
- 2023–2025: TSG Hoffenheim (goalkeeper coach)
- * Club domestic league appearances and goals

Alexander Stolz (German pronunciation: [alɛkˈsandɐ ˈʃtɔlts]; born 13 October 1983) is a German former professional footballer who played as a goalkeeper.

== Playing career ==
Stolz was born in Pforzheim. He joined VfB Stuttgart from the Regionalliga side FC Nöttingen during summer 2005, initially playing for the club's reserve team. During the 2006–07 season, the club loaned him out to TSG Hoffenheim.

He eventually made his first-team debut for Stuttgart in July 2008, playing in both of their UEFA Intertoto Cup matches against FC Saturn. On 5 March 2009, Stolz extended his contract at Stuttgart until summer 2012.

On 24 January 2012, Stolz moved to Karlsruher SC, where he played for six months.

== Coaching career ==
On 5 June 2020, Hoffenheim confirmed that Stolz would play for the club's reserve team, combined with a role as goalkeeper coach in the club's academy. But two months later, on 11 September 2020, the club confirmed that Stolz had hung up his boots and would continue as goalkeeper coach of the club's reserve team. After Michael Rechner moved to Bayern Munich in February 2023, Stolz was promoted to the first team staff. On 20 June 2025, Stolz left his role as goalkeeping coach at his own request for personal reasons and was replaced by Marjan Petkovic.

== Career statistics ==
=== Club ===
Appearances and goals by club, season and competition
| Club | Season | League | | | Cup | | Europe | | Other | | Total | |
| Club | Season | Division | Apps | Goals | Apps | Goals | Apps | Goals | Apps | Goals | Apps | Goals |
|---|---|---|---|---|---|---|---|---|---|---|---|---|
| FC Nöttingen | 2004–05 | Regionalliga Süd | 18 | 0 | — | | — | | — | | 18 | 0 |
| VfB Stuttgart II | 2005–06 | Regionalliga Süd | 11 | 0 | — | | — | | — | | 11 | 0 |
| VfB Stuttgart II | 2009–10 | 3. Liga | 8 | 0 | — | | — | | — | | 8 | 0 |
| VfB Stuttgart II | Total | | 19 | 0 | — | | — | | — | | 19 | 0 |
| VfB Stuttgart | 2005–06 | Bundesliga | 0 | 0 | 0 | 0 | 0 | 0 | — | | 0 | 0 |
| VfB Stuttgart | 2006–07 | Bundesliga | 0 | 0 | — | | — | | — | | 0 | 0 |
| VfB Stuttgart | 2007–08 | Bundesliga | 0 | 0 | 0 | 0 | 0 | 0 | — | | 0 | 0 |
| VfB Stuttgart | 2008–09 | Bundesliga | 0 | 0 | 0 | 0 | 2 | 0 | — | | 2 | 0 |
| VfB Stuttgart | 2009–10 | Bundesliga | 0 | 0 | 0 | 0 | 0 | 0 | — | | 0 | 0 |
| VfB Stuttgart | 2010–11 | Bundesliga | 0 | 0 | 0 | 0 | 0 | 0 | — | | 0 | 0 |
| VfB Stuttgart | Total | | 0 | 0 | 0 | 0 | 2 | 0 | — | | 2 | 0 |
| TSG Hoffenheim | 2006–07 | Regionalliga Süd | 2 | 0 | — | | — | | — | | 2 | 0 |
| Karlsruher SC | 2011–12 | 3. Liga | 0 | 0 | — | | — | | 0 | 0 | 0 | 0 |
| TSG Hoffenheim II | 2013–14 | Regionalliga Südwest | 6 | 0 | — | | — | | — | | 6 | 0 |
| TSG Hoffenheim II | 2014–15 | Regionalliga Südwest | 1 | 0 | — | | — | | — | | 1 | 0 |
| TSG Hoffenheim II | 2015–16 | Regionalliga Südwest | 6 | 0 | — | | — | | — | | 6 | 0 |
| TSG Hoffenheim II | 2016–17 | Regionalliga Südwest | 3 | 0 | — | | — | | — | | 3 | 0 |
| TSG Hoffenheim II | 2017–18 | Regionalliga Südwest | 7 | 0 | — | | — | | — | | 7 | 0 |
| TSG Hoffenheim II | 2018–19 | Regionalliga Südwest | 4 | 0 | — | | — | | — | | 4 | 0 |
| TSG Hoffenheim II | 2019–20 | Regionalliga Südwest | 1 | 0 | — | | — | | — | | 1 | 0 |
| TSG Hoffenheim II | Total | | 28 | 0 | — | | — | | — | | 28 | 0 |
| TSG Hoffenheim | 2013–14 | Bundesliga | 1 | 0 | 0 | 0 | — | | — | | 1 | 0 |
| TSG Hoffenheim | 2014–15 | Bundesliga | 0 | 0 | 0 | 0 | — | | — | | 0 | 0 |
| TSG Hoffenheim | 2015–16 | Bundesliga | 0 | 0 | 0 | 0 | — | | — | | 0 | 0 |
| TSG Hoffenheim | 2016–17 | Bundesliga | 0 | 0 | 0 | 0 | — | | — | | 0 | 0 |
| TSG Hoffenheim | 2017–18 | Bundesliga | 0 | 0 | 0 | 0 | 0 | 0 | — | | 0 | 0 |
| TSG Hoffenheim | 2018–19 | Bundesliga | 0 | 0 | 0 | 0 | — | | — | | 0 | 0 |
| TSG Hoffenheim | Total | | 1 | 0 | 0 | 0 | 0 | 0 | — | | 1 | 0 |
| Career total | | | 68 | 0 | 0 | 0 | 2 | 0 | 0 | 0 | 70 | 0 |
