= Shaban Ismaili =

Macedonian footballer (born 1989)

Personal information
- Date of birth: 2 May 1989 (age 37)
- Place of birth: Gostivar, SR Macedonia, SFR Yugoslavia
- Height: 1.75 m (5 ft 9 in)
- Position: Defender

Team information
- Current team: Calcio Leinfelden-Echterdingen
- Number: 26

Youth career
- TSV Eltingen
- –2008: VfB Stuttgart

Senior career*
Years	Team	Apps	(Gls)
2008–2009	VfB Stuttgart II	9	(0)
2009–2010	→ Sonnenhof Großaspach (loan)	33	(5)
2010–2012	RB Leipzig	17	(0)
2012–2013	RB Leipzig II	8	(1)
2012–2013	SG Sonnenhof Großaspach	45	(3)
2013–2014	SV Waldhof Mannheim	27	(1)
2014–2017	SGV Freiberg	49	(3)
2017–	Calcio Leinfelden-Echterdingen	96	(4)
- * Club domestic league appearances and goals as of 19 February 2021

Shaban Ismaili (born 2 May 1989 in Gostivar) is a footballer from North Macedonia who is currently playing for German 6th tier side Calcio Leinfelden-Echterdingen.
