= DFB Sports Court =

The DFB Sports Court (German: DFB-Sportgericht) is a regulatory body in the German Football Association (German: Deutscher Fussball-Bund, DFB) and may adopt different sanctions on clubs and players.

== History ==
Together with the Bundesliga, the DFB Sports Court was founded in 1963. It hears cases of misconduct by individual players, clubs or spectators. The court is a separate authority, responsible for the national and regional leagues. The judges and staff are volunteers.

== Structure ==
The structure resembles that of a normal court. The court is composed of a chief judge, a deputy and 28 assessors. The chief judge and the deputy are elected by the DFB-Bundestag. Chief judge is Hans Eberhard Lorenz.

== Proceedings ==
The DFB Sports Court convenes when serious rule violations occur. This starts directly after a red card is given. The court determines the sentence depending on the hardness of the fouls or unsportsmanlike conduct. If the clubs in question agree, the sports court creates a written statement. Only 20% of procedures end with a hearing.

Appeals against decisions from the DFB Sports Court can be presented to the DFB Federal Court.

== Important decisions ==
- 2011–12 Bundesliga's relegation play-offs

== See also ==
- Court of Arbitration for Sport
