= Abu-Bakarr Kargbo =

Sierra Leonean footballer

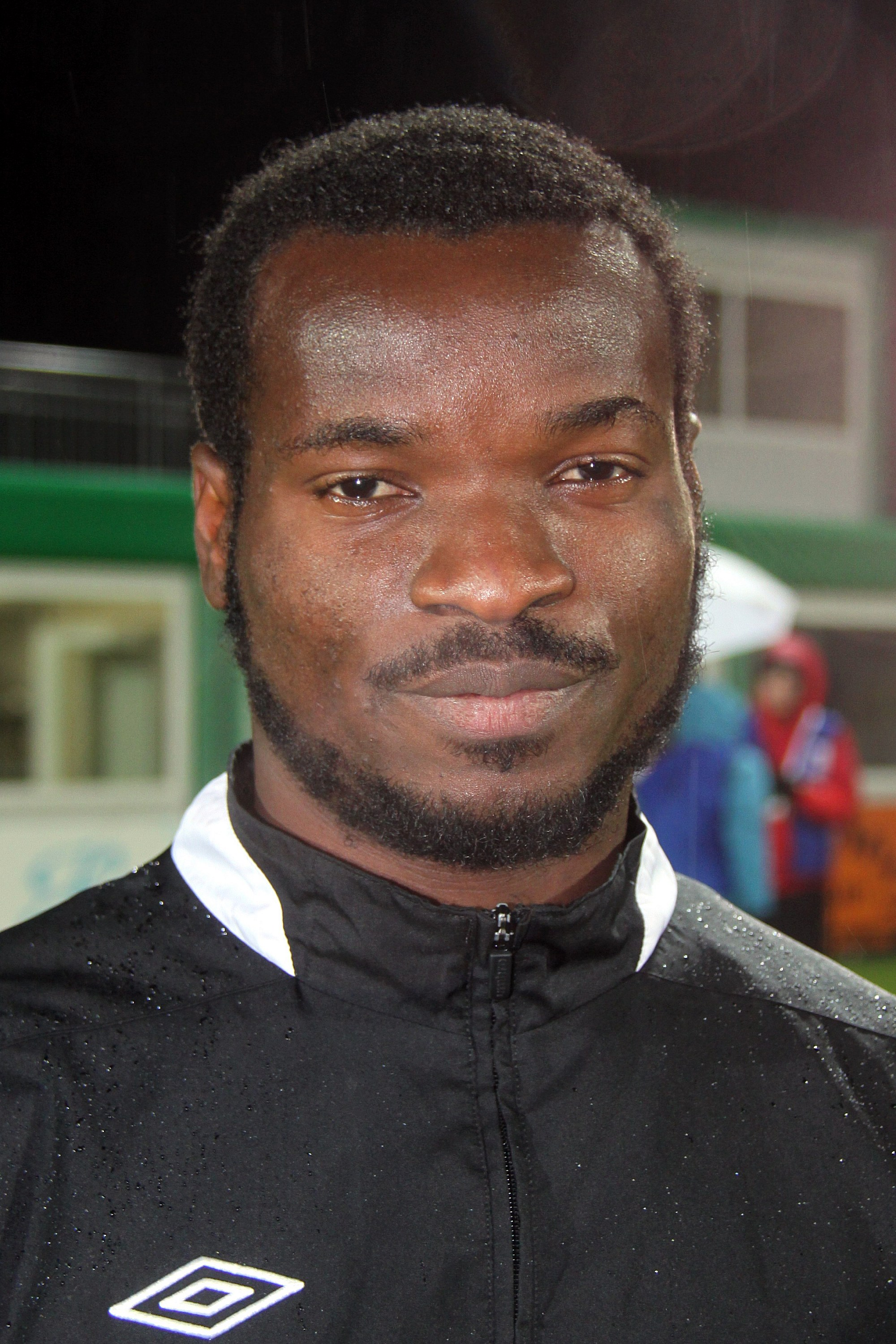
- Kargbo in 2013

Personal information
- Date of birth: 21 December 1992 (age 33)
- Place of birth: Bo, Sierra Leone
- Height: 1.83 m (6 ft 0 in)
- Position: Striker

Youth career
- TSV Rudow
- –2005: Neuköllner Sportfreunde
- 2005–2009: Hertha BSC

Senior career*
Years	Team	Apps	(Gls)
2009–2012	Hertha BSC II	52	(5)
2011–2012	Hertha BSC	0	(0)
2013	Bayer Leverkusen II	3	(0)
2013–2015	Austria Lustenau	21	(1)
2015–2016	BSV SW Rehden	43	(18)
2016–2017	SV Rödinghausen	18	(9)
2017–2018	FC Viktoria 1889 Berlin	18	(11)
2018–2020	Berliner AK	56	(30)
2020–2021	Kickers Offenbach	2	(1)
2021–2022	Berliner AK	36	(8)
2022–2023	Greifswalder FC	19	(7)
2024	Berliner AK 07	9	(0)

International career^{‡}
2007	Germany U15	1	(0)
2007–2008	Germany U16	11	(4)
2009	Germany U17	9	(0)
2009–2010	Germany U18	6	(1)
2010	Germany U19	1	(0)
2018–	Sierra Leone	1	(0)
- * Club domestic league appearances and goals as of 24 April 2024 ‡ National team caps and goals as of 19 March 2018

Abu-Bakarr Kargbo (born 21 December 1992) is a Sierra Leonean footballer who plays as a striker.

== Club career ==
Kargbo rejected a move to English side Stoke City in 2012 having played two games for the under 21 side following his release by German side Hertha BSC that summer.

== International career ==
Born in Sierra Leone, and raised in Germany, Kargbo was a youth international for Germany. On 17 March 2018, Kargbo was debuted for the Sierra Leone national football team in a friendly 4–0 loss to Iran.
