= Denis Baum =

German footballer

Personal information
- Date of birth: April 13, 1987 (age 39)
- Place of birth: Eberbach, West Germany
- Position: Goalkeeper

Team information
- Current team: VfL Gerstetten
- Number: 23

Youth career
- FC Finkenbach
- –2003: SV Waldhof Mannheim
- 2003–2005: VfB Stuttgart

Senior career*
Years	Team	Apps	(Gls)
2005–2007	VfB Stuttgart II	2	(0)
2007–2013	1. FC Heidenheim	22	(0)
2014–2015	SC Geislingen	27	(0)
2017–	VfL Gerstetten	72	(0)

Managerial career
- 2013–2014: 1. FC Heidenheim U19 (goalkeeper coach)
- * Club domestic league appearances and goals as of 18 January 2021

Denis Baum (born April 13, 1987) is a German footballer who plays as a goalkeeper for VfL Gerstetten.
