= Hans Eberhard Lorenz =

German jurist

Hans Eberhard Lorenz (born 3 March 1951) is a German jurist.

Lorenz is Presiding Judge of the criminal division at the Regional Court Mainz.

At the 39th Bundestag of the German Football Association in October 2007, Lorenz was elected as Presiding Judge of the DFB Sports Court. This position in the highest controlling body of the German Football Association is voluntary. Lorenz is considered as the "luminary in the DFB sports jurisdiction".

Lorenz lives in Wöllstein. He is father of three children.
