= Markus Babbel =

German footballer (born 1972)

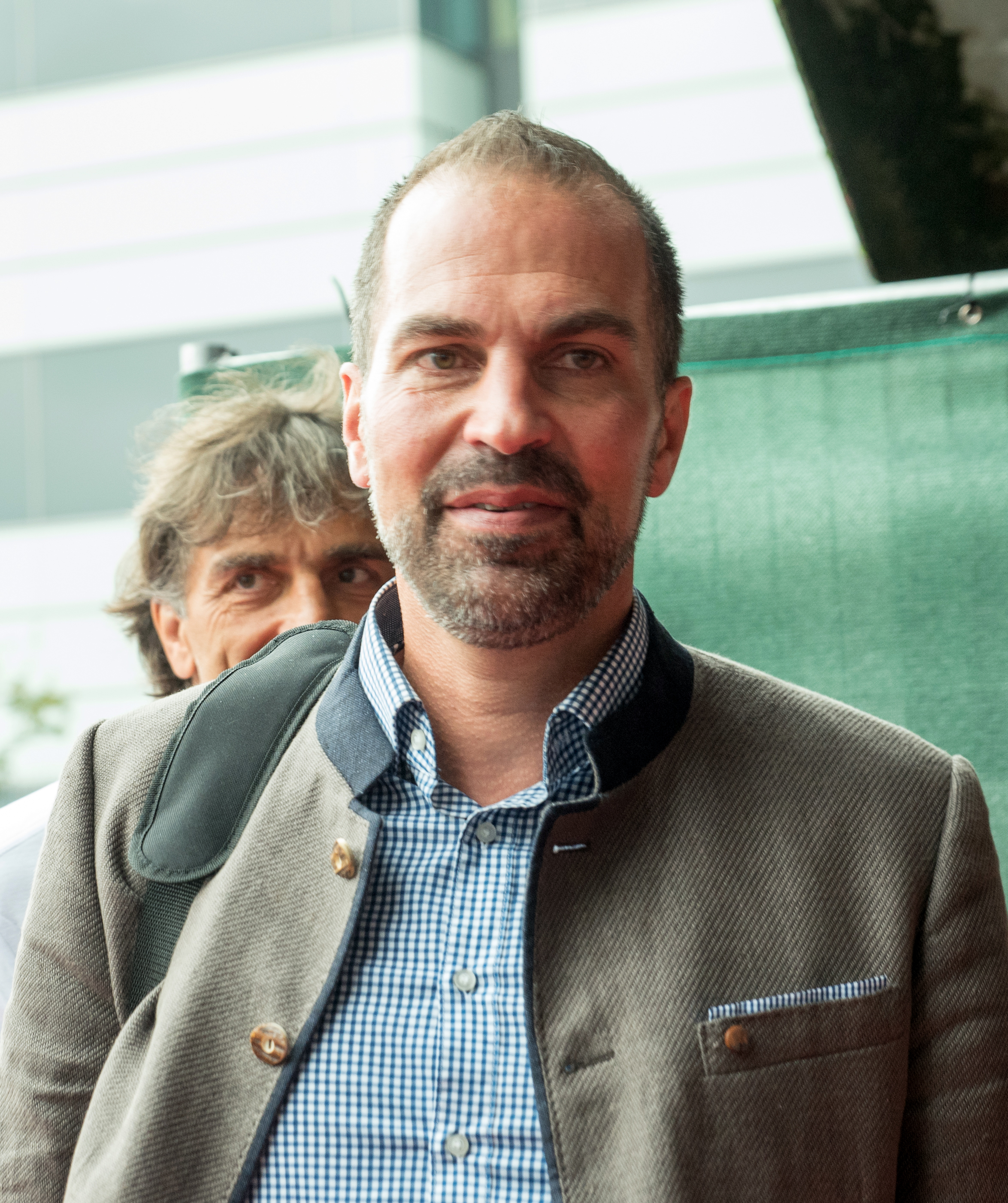
- Babbel in 2015

Personal information
- Date of birth: 8 September 1972 (age 54)
- Place of birth: Munich, West Germany
- Height: 1.91 m (6 ft 3 in)
- Positions: Centre-back; right-back

Youth career
- 1979–1981: TSV Gilching-Argelsried
- 1981–1991: Bayern Munich

Senior career*
Years	Team	Apps	(Gls)
1991–1992	Bayern Munich	12	(0)
1992–1994	Hamburger SV	60	(1)
1994–2000	Bayern Munich	170	(9)
2000–2004	Liverpool	42	(3)
2003–2004	→ Blackburn Rovers (loan)	25	(3)
2004–2007	VfB Stuttgart	46	(2)
Total		355	(18)

International career
1992–1993	Germany U21	12	(0)
1995–2000	Germany	51	(1)

Managerial career
- 2007–2008: VfB Stuttgart (assistant)
- 2008–2009: VfB Stuttgart
- 2010–2011: Hertha BSC
- 2012: TSG Hoffenheim
- 2014–2018: FC Luzern
- 2018–2020: Western Sydney Wanderers
Medal record
Men's football
Representing Germany
UEFA European Championship
Winner	1996 England
- * Club domestic league appearances and goals

Markus Babbel (pronounced [ˈmaʁkʊs ˈbabl̩]; born 8 September 1972) is a German professional football coach and former player who most recently managed Western Sydney Wanderers FC. He played as a defender for clubs in Germany and England. Babbel won the UEFA Cup twice: in 1996 with Bayern Munich and in 2001 with Liverpool. He was also a member of the Germany squad that won UEFA Euro 96.

== Playing career ==
=== Bayern Munich ===
Born in Munich, Babbel began his professional career with Bayern Munich. Progressing from the youth squad to the first team, he became a regular contributor, starting in eight league matches and appearing as a substitute in four others.

=== Hamburger SV and return to Bayern Munich ===
He transferred to Hamburger SV in August 1992, where he became a regular in the first team and scored his first league goal in Germany's top flight. Returning to Bayern Munich in 1994, Babbel made 167 starts and caught the attention of Manchester United following UEFA Euro 1996. Although a £5 million deal was arranged for the German full-back, it ultimately fell through. In June 2000, Liverpool F.C. manager Gérard Houllier signed Babbel on a Bosman transfer. He became a key member of Liverpool's back four during their triumphant 2000–01 season.

=== Liverpool ===
Babbel was a key figure in Liverpool's lineup, known for his trademark surging runs down the right flank, which contributed to several goals, including one in the UEFA Cup final. However, his Liverpool career came to an abrupt halt when he was diagnosed with Guillain–Barré syndrome, sidelining him for an entire year.

=== Blackburn Rovers ===
He joined Blackburn Rovers on loan in August 2003 after recovering from Guillain–Barré syndrome, making regular first-team appearances in the league and scoring three goals.

=== VfB Stuttgart ===
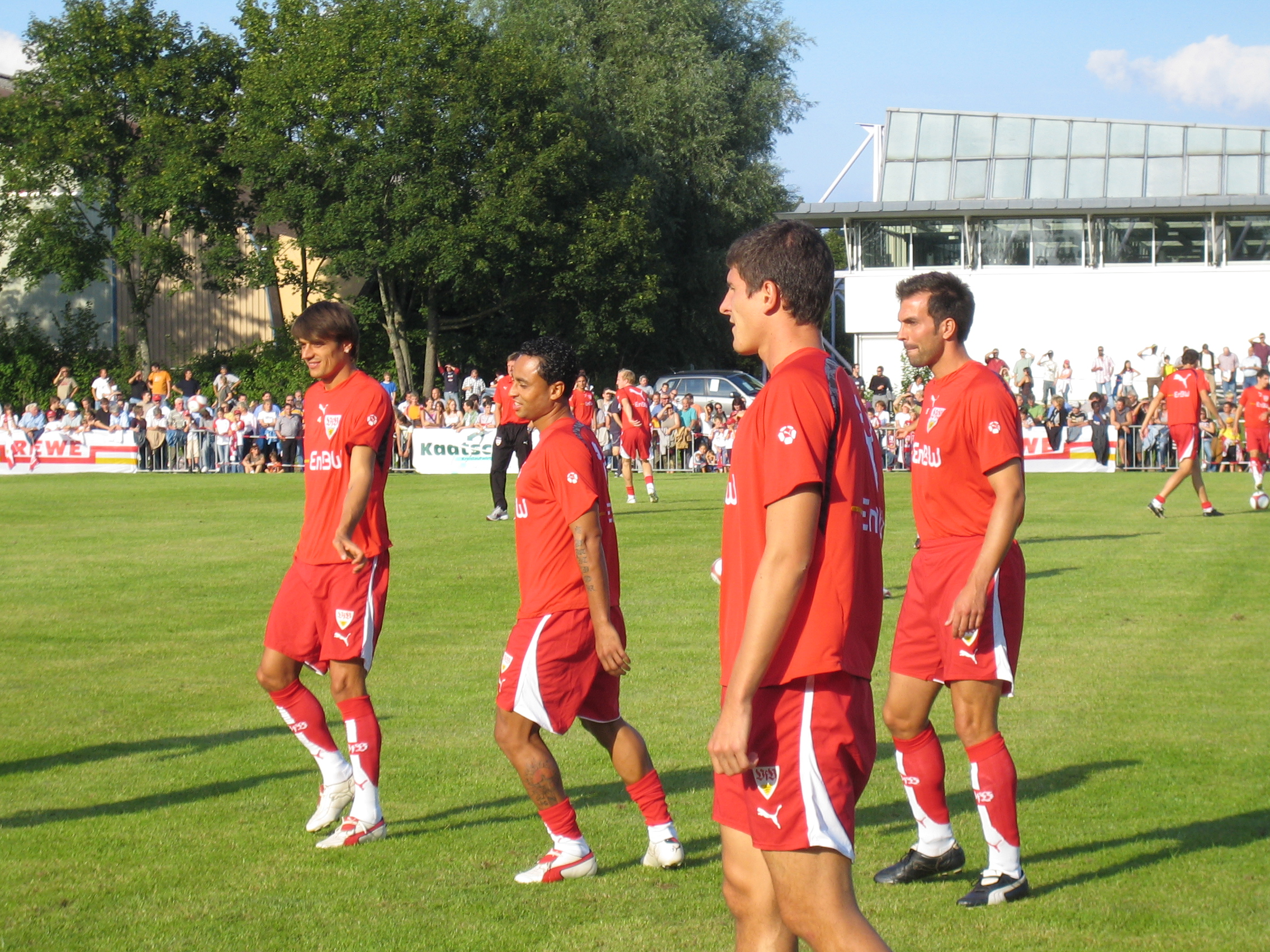
Babbel (right) with VfB Stuttgart during the 2006–07 season

Babbel's final club was VfB Stuttgart, which he joined on a free transfer in July 2004. In January 2007, Babbel announced his intention to retire at the end of the 2006–07 season.

=== Germany national team ===
He was capped 51 times and scored one goal for the Germany and was part of the Euro 96 winning team. Babbel also represented his country at the 1998 FIFA World Cup and Euro 2000.

== Coaching career ==
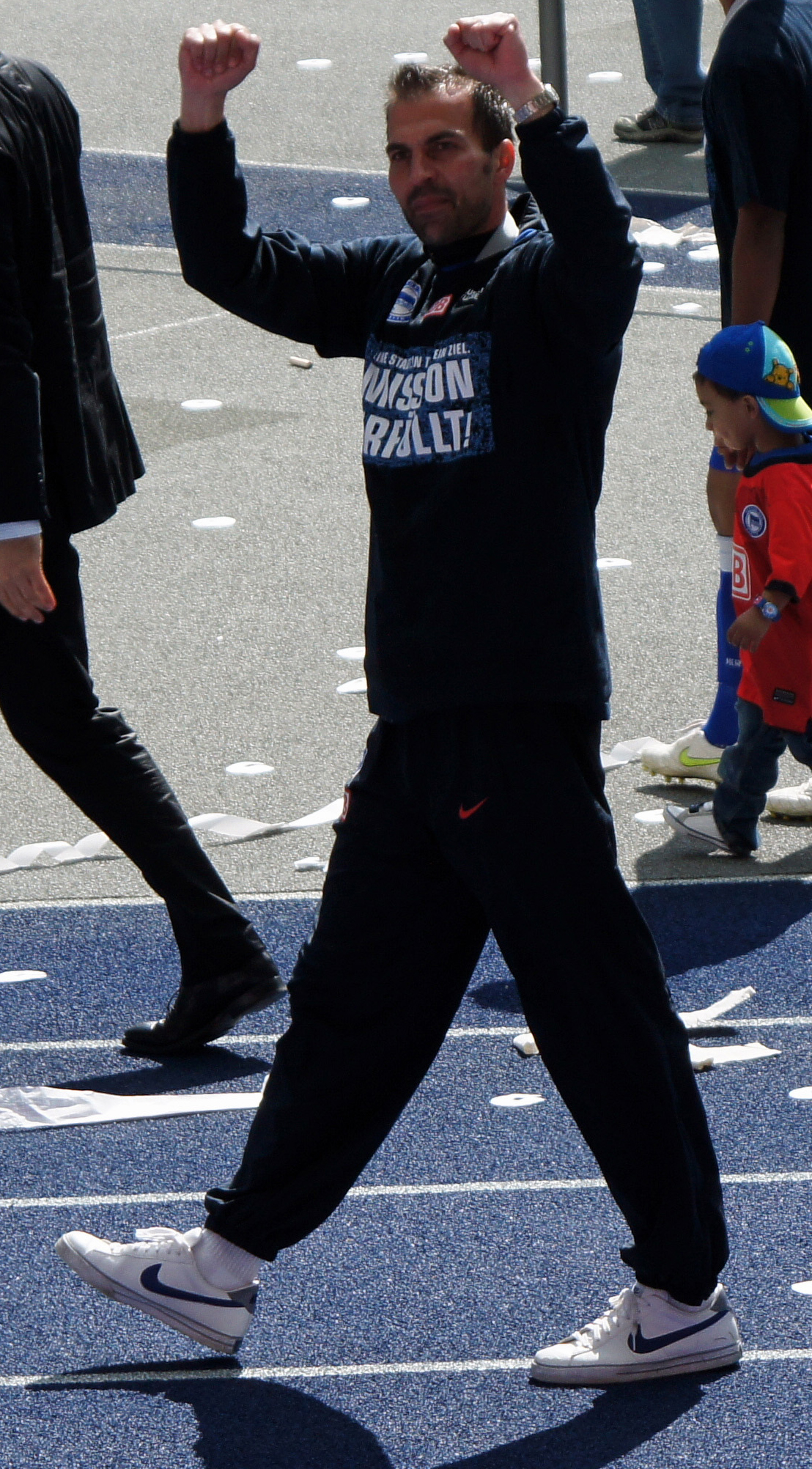
Babbel with Hertha BSC in 2011

=== 2007–12: Early career ===
Following his retirement from football, Babbel remained with his last club, VfB Stuttgart, as an assistant manager.

On 24 November 2008, Babbel became head coach of VfB Stuttgart. At the time of Babbel's appointment, VfB Stuttgart were 11th in the table after 14 games. Babbel's first match was a 1–1 draw against Sampdoria on 27 November 2008. Under his leadership, the team finished the season in third place, five points behind league winners VfL Wolfsburg, and qualified for the Champions League. On 6 May 2009, Babbel signed a contract extension with VfB Stuttgart until the summer of 2011. However, on 6 December 2009, VfB Stuttgart and Babbel parted ways. His final match was a 1–1 draw against VfL Bochum on 5 December 2009. At the time of his dismissal, VfB Stuttgart were in 16th place after 15 games played. Babbel's record at Stuttgart stood at 21 wins, 15 draws, and 14 losses. Under Babbel, VfB Stuttgart finished second in their Champions League group and qualified for the round of 16.

Babbel took over as head coach of Hertha BSC in July 2010, guiding the team in the 2nd division. His first match was a 2–0 win in the German Cup. Babbel successfully led Hertha BSC to promotion back to the Bundesliga by winning the 2. Bundesliga during the 2010–11 season. However, on 18 December 2011, Babbel was dismissed as coach of Hertha BSC. Prior to his dismissal, Babbel had expressed his intention to leave the club at the end of the season. His last match was a 1–1 draw against TSG Hoffenheim on 17 December 2011. At the time of his departure, Hertha BSC were in 11th place in the league. Babbel's tenure at Hertha BSC concluded with a record of 30 wins, 13 draws, and 12 losses.

On 10 February 2012, Babbel was appointed manager of TSG Hoffenheim. At the time, 1899 Hoffenheim was in eighth place. His first match ended in a 1–1 draw against Werder Bremen. 1899 Hoffenheim completed the season in 11th place. On 3 December 2012, Babbel was dismissed due to poor results, with the team in 16th place in the Bundesliga. Babbel's final match was a 4–1 loss to Werder Bremen. His tenure concluded with a record of seven wins, eight draws, and 15 losses.

=== 2014–2018: FC Luzern ===
Babbel became the new head coach of Luzern on 12 October 2014, following the dismissal of Carlos Bernegger who had failed to win a single league game during the 2014–15 season. Babbel's first match was a 0–0 draw against Vaduz on 19 October 2014. Luzern finished the 2014–15 season in fifth place.

The 2015–16 season began with a 2–2 draw against Sion on 18 July 2015. During the 2015–16 season, Luzern reached the semi-final of the Swiss Cup and finished third in the league.

The 2016–17 season began with six matches between 23 July 2016 and 7 August 2016. Luzern won the opening match of the season 2–1 against Lugano on 23 July 2016.

=== 2018: Western Sydney Wanderers ===
On 19 May 2018, Babbel was appointed manager of Western Sydney Wanderers FC in the A-League. The 2018–19 A-League season saw the Wanderers finish eighth out of ten teams, winning only six games, drawing six, and losing 15. In the 2019–20 season, after a promising start that included a 1–0 victory over Sydney FC in the first Sydney Derby at the new Western Sydney Stadium, the team experienced a dramatic collapse, securing only 1 win and 2 draws in the next 11 matches, dropping from first place after 3 rounds to 9th place (out of 11) after 14 games. Babbel was dismissed by the Wanderers on Monday, 20 January 2020, with his assistant coach appointed as interim replacement.

=== Overview ===
As of 11 December 2016

Club	Season	League								Cup	Europe	Ref.
Club	Season	M	W	D	L	GF	GA	Win %	Pos.	Pos.	Pos.	Ref.
Stuttgart	2008–09	20	14	4	2	44	22	70.00	3rd	R16	SR	
Stuttgart	2009–10	15	2	6	7	12	21	13.33	16th	R16	R16	
Stuttgart	Totals	35	16	10	9	56	43	45.71	—	—	—	—
Hertha BSC	2010–11	34	23	5	6	69	28	67.65	1st	SR	—	
Hertha BSC	2011–12	17	4	8	5	24	26	23.53	11th	R16	—	
Hertha BSC	Totals	51	27	13	11	93	54	52.94	—	—	—	—
TSG Hoffenheim	2011–12	14	4	5	5	19	23	28.57	11th	—	—	
TSG Hoffenheim	2012–13	15	3	3	9	22	36	20.00	16th	FR	—	
TSG Hoffenheim	Totals	29	7	8	14	41	59	24.14	—	—	—	—
Luzern	2014–15	25	12	6	7	42	25	48.00	5th	R16	—	
Luzern	2015–16	36	15	9	12	59	50	41.67	3rd	SF	—	
Luzern	2016–17	18	9	2	7	36	33	50.00				
Luzern	Totals	79	36	17	26	137	108	45.57	—	—	—	—

== Career statistics ==
=== International ===
Score and result list Germany's goal tally first, score column indicates score after Babbel goal.

International goal scored by Markus Babbel
No.	Date	Venue	Opponent	Score	Result	Competition
1	6 September 1995	Frankenstadion, Nuremberg, Germany	Georgia	4–1	4–1	UEFA Euro 1996 qualifying

=== Managerial statistics ===
As of 4 June 2019

Team	From	To	Record								
Team	From	To	M	W	D	L	GF	GA	GD	Win %	Ref.
Stuttgart	24 November 2008	6 December 2009	50	21	15	14	78	62	+16	42.00	
Hertha BSC	1 July 2010	18 December 2011	55	30	13	12	103	56	+47	54.55	
TSG Hoffenheim	10 February 2012	3 December 2012	30	7	8	15	41	63	−22	23.33	
Luzern	12 October 2014	5 January 2018	123	54	28	41	222	192	+30	43.90	
Western Sydney Wanderers	19 May 2018	20 January 2020	31	9	6	16	50	53	−3	29.03	
Total			289	121	70	98	494	426	+68	41.87	—

== Honours ==
=== As a player ===
Bayern Munich

- Bundesliga: 1996–97, 1998–99, 1999–2000
- DFB-Pokal: 1997–98, 1999–00
- DFB-Ligapokal: 1997, 1998, 1999
- UEFA Cup: 1995–96
- UEFA Champions League runner-up: 1998–99

Liverpool

- FA Cup: 2000–01
- Football League Cup: 2000–01
- FA Community Shield: 2001
- UEFA Cup: 2000–01
- UEFA Super Cup: 2001

VfB Stuttgart

- Bundesliga: 2006–07
- DFB-Pokal runner-up: 2006–07
- DFB-Ligapokal runner-up: 2005

Germany

- UEFA European Championship: 1996
- Military World Cup third place: 1993

=== As a coach ===
Hertha BSC

- 2. Bundesliga: 2010–11
