= Robin Schuster =

German footballer

Personal information
- Date of birth: April 24, 1987 (age 39)
- Place of birth: Bietigheim-Bissingen, West Germany
- Height: 1.93 m (6 ft 4 in)
- Position: Central defender

Youth career
- –2007: FV Löchgau

Senior career*
Years	Team	Apps	(Gls)
2007–2009	VfB Stuttgart II	14	(0)
2009–2011	SC Freiburg II	25	(0)
2011–2016	SGS Großaspach	110	(8)
Total		149	(8)
- * Club domestic league appearances and goals

Robin Schuster (born April 24, 1987) is a German former professional footballer who played as a central defender. He is the brother of Julian Schuster and the cousin of Benedikt Röcker.
