= Jeremy Karikari =

Ghanaian-German footballer

Personal information
- Full name: Jeremy Opoku-Karikari
- Date of birth: 23 July 1987 (age 39)
- Place of birth: Hamburg, West Germany
- Height: 1.85 m (6 ft 1 in)
- Positions: Defensive midfielder; right-back

Youth career
- Concordia Hamburg
- Eimsbütteler TV
- Hamburger SV
- –2006: FC St. Pauli

Senior career*
Years	Team	Apps	(Gls)
2006–2008	FC St. Pauli II	36	(0)
2007–2008	FC St. Pauli	2	(0)
2008–2010	VfB Stuttgart II	42	(0)
2010–2011	Jahn Regensburg	8	(1)
2011–2012	Eintracht Trier	39	(2)
2012–2013	RB Leipzig	11	(0)
2013–2014	VfL Osnabrück	7	(0)
2014–2015	SV Elversberg	20	(0)
2016–2017	Eintracht Norderstedt	25	(2)
2017–2019	TuS Dassendorf	32	(3)
Total		222	(8)
- * Club domestic league appearances and goals

Jeremy Karikari (born 23 July 1987) is a Ghanaian-German former professional footballer who played as defensive midfielder or right-back.
