= Timo Hammel =

German footballer

Personal information
- Full name: 27 August 1987 (age 39)
- Place of birth: Mosbach, West Germany
- Position: Goalkeeper

Team information
- Current team: GSV Maichingen

Youth career
- SV Aglasterhausen
- –2003: SC Sinsheim
- 2003–2005: VfB Stuttgart

Senior career*
Years	Team	Apps	(Gls)
2005–2010	VfB Stuttgart II	44	(0)
2011	FC St. Gallen	0	(0)
2011–2012	FSV 08 Bissingen		
2012–2014	SSV Reutlingen 05	59	(0)
2014–	GSV Maichingen		
- * Club domestic league appearances and goals as of 9 December 2009

Timo Hammel (born 27 August 1987) is a German footballer who plays as a goalkeeper for GSV Maichingen.
