= Joachim Schwabe =

German footballer

Personal information
- Full name: Joachim Schwabe
- Date of birth: 24 August 1983 (age 43)
- Place of birth: Jena, East Germany
- Height: 1.79 m (5 ft 10 in)
- Position: Defender

Youth career
- –2002: Carl Zeiss Jena

Senior career*
Years	Team	Apps	(Gls)
2002–2004	Carl Zeiss Jena	56	(2)
2004–2009	VfB Stuttgart II	71	(2)
2009–2010	FSV Bissingen		
- * Club domestic league appearances and goals

Joachim Schwabe (born 24 August 1983) is a German former footballer who played as a defender.

== Career ==
Schwabe made his professional debut in the 3. Liga for VfB Stuttgart II on 2 August 2008, starting in the away match against Union Berlin which finished as a 1–3 loss.
