= Rainer Adrion =

German footballer and manager

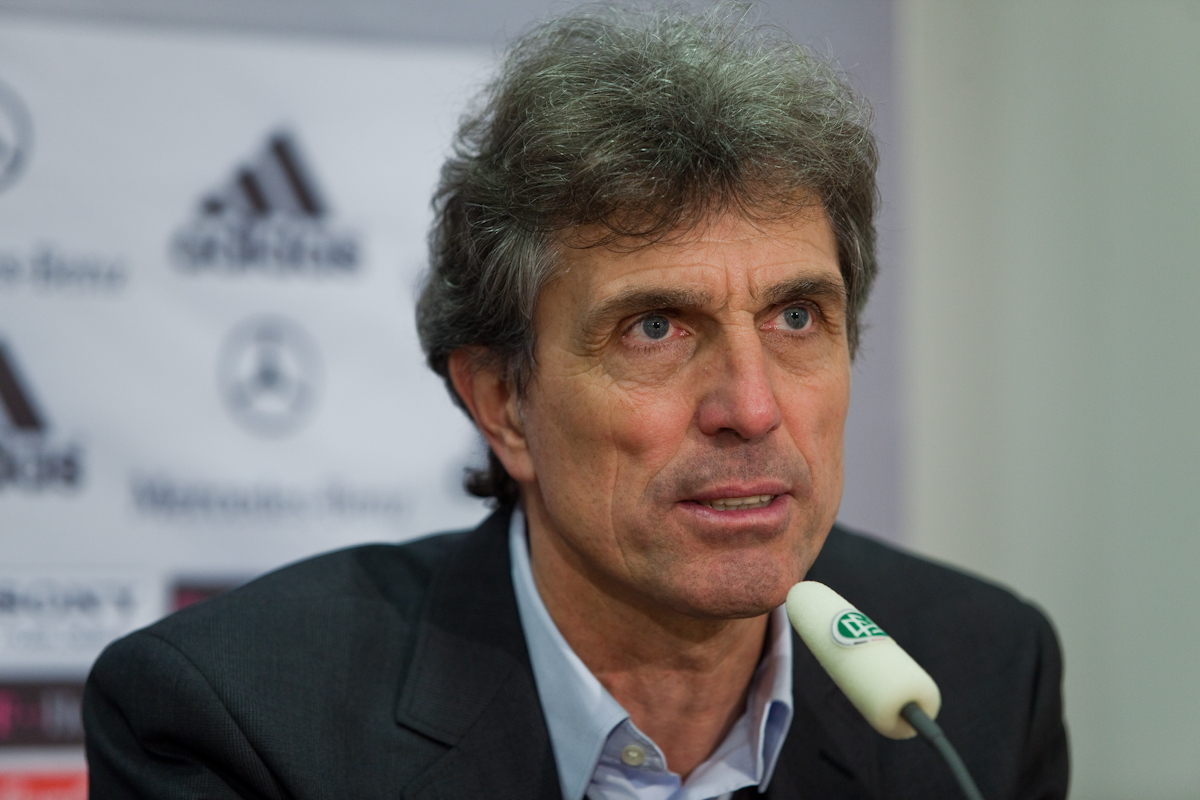

Personal information
- Date of birth: 10 December 1953 (age 72)
- Place of birth: Stuttgart, West Germany
- Height: 1.83 m (6 ft 0 in)
- Position: Defender

Senior career*
Years	Team	Apps	(Gls)
1972–1973	VfB Stuttgart II		
1973–1977	SpVgg Ludwigsburg		
1977–1978	FV Zuffenhausen		
1978–1982	VfB Stuttgart II		
1980–1982	VfB Stuttgart	22	(0)
1982–1984	SpVgg Unterhaching		
1984–1985	TSV 1860 München	7	(0)
1985–1988	FV Zuffenhausen		

Managerial career
- 1988–1991: SpVgg Ludwigsburg
- 1991–1993: SpVgg Unterhaching
- 1993–1994: SSV Reutlingen
- 1994–1995: VfR Pforzheim
- 1996–1998: VfB Stuttgart (co-trainer)
- 1999: VfB Stuttgart (caretaker)
- 1999–2001: VfB Stuttgart II
- 2001–2002: SpVgg Unterhaching
- 2003: Stuttgarter Kickers
- 2004–2009: VfB Stuttgart II
- 2009–2013: Germany U-21
- * Club domestic league appearances and goals

Rainer Adrion (born 10 December 1953) is a German football manager and former defender.

== Coaching career ==
Adrion was head coach of SpVgg Unterhaching on two occasions. The first stint was from July 1991 to May 1993 and the second stint was from September 2001 to April 2002. Adrion went on to be the head coach at VfB Stuttgart II; managing them on three occasions. The first stint started in January 1996. He was their head coach for them until he became head coach of the first team in December 1998. The third stint happened from June 2004 to June 2009 when he became the new head coach for the Germany U21 team. Then Adrion was head coach of VfB Stuttgart from December 1998 to May 1999. Adrion was winless in his last eight matches. He had two wins during his tenure. After his second spell at Unterhaching, Adrion became head coach at Stuttgarter Kickers from March 2003 to October 2003. Adrion became the new head coach for the Germany U21 team in June 2009. He was sacked in June 2013 after failing to get out of the group stage of the European Championship.

=== Coaching record ===
As of 29 January 2014

Team	From	To	Record					
Team	From	To	G	W	D	L	Win %	Ref.
SpVgg Unterhaching	1 July 1991	10 May 1993	77	34	24	19	44.16	
VfB Stuttgart II	1 January 1996	28 December 1998	90	54	23	13	60.00	
VfB Stuttgart	28 December 1998	3 May 1999	11	2	6	3	18.18	
VfB Stuttgart II	1 July 1999	13 September 2001	76	30	26	20	39.47	
SpVgg Unterhaching	13 September 2001	2 April 2002	25	7	6	12	28.00	
Stuttgarter Kickers	10 March 2003	27 October 2003	26	8	8	10	30.77	
VfB Stuttgart II	16 June 2004	1 June 2009	174	70	46	58	40.23	
Total			479	205	139	135	42.80	—

== Personal ==
Adrin has two sons, Benjamin is a former footballer, currently journalist of the Magazin "VIVA St. Pauli" and his second son Nico is also professional footballer.
