= 2003–04 VfB Stuttgart season =

VfB Stuttgart
2003–04 season
- Manager: Felix Magath
- Bundesliga: 4th
- Champions League: Round of 16
- DFB-Pokal: Last 16
- Top goalscorer: Kevin Kurányi (11)
| Home colours | Away colours |

VfB Stuttgart debuted in the modern-era 32-team Champions League with a progression from the group stage and a somewhat surprising victory with 2–1 against English champions Manchester United. Ultimately, the tournament ended with a narrow defeat to Chelsea. Kevin Kurányi, Philipp Lahm and Alexander Hleb were key players in a side that only just failed to finish in the top three for the second season in succession. Following an initial eight clean sheets, the attack suffered from only Kurányi being able to score, despite goalkeeper Timo Hildebrand keeping 18 clean sheets.

== Players ==
=== First-team squad ===
Squad at end of season

Note: Flags indicate national team as defined under FIFA eligibility rules; some limited exceptions apply. Players may hold more than one non-FIFA nationality.

| No. | Pos. | Nation | Player |
|---|---|---|---|
| 1 | GK | GER | Timo Hildebrand |
| 2 | DF | GER | Andreas Hinkel |
| 3 | DF | CRO | Boris Živković (Note: Živković was born in Živinice, SFR Yugoslavia (now Bosnia and Herzegovina), but also qualified to represent Croatia internationally and made his debut for Croatia in 1999.) |
| 4 | DF | ANG | Rui Marques |
| 5 | DF | BRA | Marcelo Bordon |
| 6 | DF | POR | Fernando Meira |
| 7 | MF | GER | Silvio Meißner |
| 8 | MF | CRO | Jurica Vranješ |
| 9 | FW | SUI | Marco Streller |
| 11 | MF | SUI | Hakan Yakin |
| 12 | DF | GER | Heiko Gerber |
| 13 | MF | GER | Christian Tiffert |
| 14 | MF | ARG | Emanuel Centurión |
| 15 | MF | BLR | Alexander Hleb |
| 16 | MF | GER | Horst Heldt |
| 18 | FW | BRA | Cacau (Note: Cacau was born in Santo André, Brazil, but also qualified to represent Germany internationally after gaining citizenship in 2009 and made his international debut for Germany in May 2009.) |

| No. | Pos. | Nation | Player |
|---|---|---|---|
| 19 | FW | HUN | Imre Szabics |
| 20 | DF | CRO | Zvonimir Soldo |
| 21 | DF | GER | Philipp Lahm (on loan from Bayern Munich) |
| 22 | FW | GER | Kevin Kurányi (Note: Kurányi was born in Rio de Janeiro, Brazil, but also qualified to represent Germany internationally through his father and Panama through his mother and represented Germany at U-21 and B level before making his international debut for Germany in March 2003.) |
| 23 | GK | GER | Dirk Heinen |
| 25 | MF | GER | Michael Mutzel |
| 28 | DF | GER | Michael Fink |
| 29 | DF | GER | Steffen Dangelmayr |
| 30 | MF | AUT | Denis Berger |
| 31 | GK | SUI | Diego Benaglio |
| 33 | DF | CMR | Serge Branco |
| 35 | DF | GER | Markus Husterer (on loan from Bayern Munich II) |
| 37 | MF | BUL | Ivan Stoyanov |
| 38 | MF | GER | Tobias Rathgeb |
| 45 | FW | GER | Mario Gómez |

=== Left club during season ===
Note: Flags indicate national team as defined under FIFA eligibility rules; some limited exceptions apply. Players may hold more than one non-FIFA nationality.

| No. | Pos. | Nation | Player |
|---|---|---|---|
| 3 | DF | GER | Timo Wenzel (to Kaiserslautern) |
| 11 | FW | GRE | Ioannis Amanatidis (to Eintracht Frankfurt) |

| No. | Pos. | Nation | Player |
|---|---|---|---|
| 24 | DF | GER | Michael Rundio (to Greuther Fürth) |

== Results ==
=== Bundesliga ===
- Hansa Rostock-VfB Stuttgart 0–2
- 0–1 Imre Szabics 75'
- 0–2 Imre Szabics 76'
- VfB Stuttgart-Hertha BSC 0–0
- Mönchengladbach-VfB Stuttgart 0–1
- 0–1 Cacau 33'
- VfB Stuttgart-1. FC Kaiserslautern 2–0
- 1–0 Cacau 8'
- 2–0 Zvonimir Soldo 14'
- Schalke 04-VfB Stuttgart 0–0
- VfB Stuttgart-Borussia Dortmund 1–0
- 1–0 Kevin Kurányi 67'
- 1860 Munich-Stuttgart 0–3
- 0–1 Zvonimir Soldo 12'
- 0–2 Fernando Meira 18' (pen.)
- 0–3 Alexander Hleb 50'
- VfB Stuttgart-1. FC Köln 0–0
- Werder Bremen-VfB Stuttgart 1–3
- 0–1 Imre Szabics 31'
- 0–2 Kevin Kurányi 34'
- 1–2 Angelos Charisteas 59'
- 1–3 Christian Tiffert 90'
- VfB Stuttgart-VfL Wolfsburg 1–0
- 1–0 Ioannis Amanatidis 73'
- VfB Stuttgart-SC Freiburg 4–1
- 1–0 Kevin Kurányi 34'
- 1–1 Soumaila Coulibaly 45' (pen.)
- 2–1 Christian Tiffert 62'
- 3–1 Alexander Hleb 64'
- 4–1 Kevin Kurányi 66'
- Eintracht Frankfurt-VfB Stuttgart 0–2
- 0–1 Imre Szabics 8'
- 0–2 Kevin Kurányi 69'
- VfB Stuttgart-Hannover 96 3–1
- 1–0 Imre Szabics 29'
- 2–0 Silvio Meißner 78'
- 2–1 Thomas Brdarić 82'
- 3–1 Silvio Meißner 90'
- VfL Bochum-VfB Stuttgart 0–0
- VfB Stuttgart-Hamburger SV 0–0
- Bayern Munich-VfB Stuttgart 1–0
- 1–0 Roy Makaay 74'
- VfB Stuttgart-Bayer Leverkusen 2–3
- 0–1 Carsten Ramelow 23'
- 0–2 Dimitar Berbatov 44'
- 1–2 Kevin Kurányi 56'
- 1–3 Dimitar Berbatov 62'
- 2–3 Zvonimir Soldo 68'
- VfB Stuttgart-Hansa Rostock 2–0
- 1–0 Alexander Hleb 59'
- 2–0 Kevin Kurányi 75'
- Hertha BSC-VfB Stuttgart 1–0
- 1–0 Fredi Bobic 87'
- VfB Stuttgart-Borussia Mönchengladbach 1–1
- 1–0 Imre Szabics 5'
- 1–1 Václav Svěrkoš 85'
- 1. FC Kaiserslautern-VfB Stuttgart 1–0
- 1–0 José Dominguez 4'
- VfB Stuttgart-Schalke 04 0–0
- Borussia Dortmund-VfB Stuttgart 0–2
- 0–1 Alexander Hleb 6'
- 0–2 Horst Heldt 81' (pen.)
- VfB Stuttgart-1860 München 2–0
- 1–0 Zvonimir Soldo 31'
- 2–0 Marco Streller 34'
- 1. FC Köln-VfB Stuttgart 2–2
- 0–1 Silvio Meißner 28'
- 1–1 Florian Kringe 45'
- 2–1 Markus Feulner 71'
- 2–2 Matthias Scherz 72' (o.g.)
- VfB Stuttgart-Werder Bremen 4–4
- 1–0 Marcelo Bordon 3'
- 1–1 Ivan Klasnić 14'
- 2–1 Marcelo Bordon 25'
- 2–2 Ivan Klasnić 35'
- 2–3 Aílton 43'
- 3–3 Marcelo Bordon 50'
- 4–3 Marco Streller 69'
- 4–4 Aílton 70'
- SC Freiburg-VfB Stuttgart 1–5
- 0–1 Heiko Gerber 6'
- 0–2 Marco Streller 26'
- 1–2 Martin Petrov 30'
- 1–3 Philipp Lahm 43'
- 1–4 Kevin Kurányi 75'
- 1–5 Imre Szabics 86'
- SC Freiburg-VfB Stuttgart 0–1
- 0–1 Kevin Kurányi 10'
- VfB Stuttgart-Eintracht Frankfurt 3–1
- 1–0 Kevin Kurányi 45'
- 2–0 Alexander Hleb 48'
- 3–0 Marcelo Bordon 79'
- 3–1 Alexander Schur 84'
- Hannover 96-VfB Stuttgart 0–1
- 0–1 Silvio Meißner 10'
- VfB Stuttgart-VfL Bochum 1–1
- 1–0 Cacau 33'
- 1–1 Marcelo Bordon 59' (o.g.)
- Hamburger SV-VfB Stuttgart 2–1
- 1–0 Stefan Beinlich 38'
- 2–0 Nico-Jan Hoogma 47'
- 2–1 Cacau 86'
- VfB Stuttgart-Bayern Munich 3–1
- 1–0 Imre Szabics 19'
- 2–0 Imre Szabics 53'
- 3–0 Kevin Kurányi 55'
- 3–1 Claudio Pizarro 78'
- Bayer Leverkusen-VfB Stuttgart 2–0
- 1–0 Dimitar Berbatov 63'
- 2–0 Bernd Schneider 85'

=== Top scorers ===
- (Germany) Kevin Kurányi 11
- (Hungary) Imre Szabics 9
- (Belarus) Alexander Hleb 5
- (Brazil) Cacau 4
- (Croatia) Zvonimir Soldo 4

== Champions League ==
=== Group stage ===
- Rangers-VfB Stuttgart 2–1
- 0–1 Kevin Kurányi 45'
- 1–1 Christian Nerlinger 74'
- 2–1 Peter Løvenkrands 79'
- VfB Stuttgart-Manchester United 2–1
- 1–0 Imre Szabics 50'
- 2–0 Kevin Kurányi 51'
- 2–1 Ruud van Nistelrooy 67' (pen.)
- VfB Stuttgart-Panathinaikos 2–0
- 1–0 Imre Szabics 12'
- 2–0 Zvonimir Soldo 25'
- Panathinaikos-VfB Stuttgart 1–3
- 1–0 Michalis Konstantinou 60'
- 1–1 Takis Fyssas 68' (o.g.)
- 1–2 Kevin Kurányi 75'
- 1–3 Andreas Hinkel 76'
- VfB Stuttgart-Rangers 1–0
- 1–0 Timo Wenzel 45'
- Manchester United-VfB Stuttgart 2–0
- 1–0 Ruud van Nistelrooy 45'
- 2–0 Ryan Giggs 58'

=== Last 16 ===
- Stuttgart-Chelsea 0–1
- 0–1 Fernando Meira 12' (o.g.)
- Chelsea-VfB Stuttgart 0–0

== Reserve team ==
VfB Stuttgart II were coached by Reinhold Fanz and finished 11th in the Regionalliga Süd.

Note: Flags indicate national team as defined under FIFA eligibility rules; some limited exceptions apply. Players may hold more than one non-FIFA nationality.

| No. | Pos. | Nation | Player |
|---|---|---|---|
| — | GK | SUI | Diego Benaglio |
| — | GK | GER | Julien Jourdan |
| — | GK | GER | Milan Jurkovic |
| — | GK | BIH | Adnan Masic |
| — | DF | GER | Daniel Alabi |
| — | DF | GER | Heiko Butscher |
| — | DF | GER | Steffen Dangelmayr |
| — | DF | GER | Michael Fink |
| — | DF | GER | Markus Husterer (from August) |
| — | DF | GER | Steffen Kocholl |
| — | DF | GER | Florian Lechner |
| — | DF | GER | Marcel Schuon |
| — | MF | GER | Marco Caligiuri |
| — | MF | AUT | Denis Berger |
| — | MF | CMR | Serge Branco |
| — | MF | GER | Marco di Biccari |
| — | MF | GER | Christopher Krause |
| — | MF | GER | José Macias |

| No. | Pos. | Nation | Player |
|---|---|---|---|
| — | MF | RUS | Yuri Mamaev |
| — | MF | GER | Jens Rasiejewski |
| — | MF | GER | Tobias Rathgeb |
| — | MF | GER | Giuseppe Ricciardi |
| — | MF | GER | Michael Rundio (from January) |
| — | MF | GER | Zdravko Tuzlak |
| — | MF | GER | Robert Vujević |
| — | MF | GER | Christian Walter |
| — | FW | NGA | Stephen Famewo |
| — | FW | GER | Mario Gómez |
| — | FW | LTU | Dmitrijus Guščinas (from January) |
| — | FW | GER | Steffen Handschuh |
| — | FW | BLR | Vyacheslav Hleb (to January) |
| — | FW | GER | Felix Luz (to January) |
| — | FW | GER | Gerrit Müller |
| — | FW | GER | Gustav Schulz |
| — | FW | GER | Tobias Weis |

== Sources ==
Results & Fixtures for Stuttgart – Soocerbase.com
