= 2004–05 VfB Stuttgart season =

VfB Stuttgart
2004–05 season
- President: Erwin Staudt
- Head coach: Matthias Sammer
- Stadium: Gottlieb-Daimler-Stadion
- Bundesliga: 5th
- DFB-Pokal: Round of 16
- UEFA Cup: Round of 32
- Top goalscorer: League: Kevin Kurányi (13); All: Kevin Kurányi (18)
- Biggest win: TuS Mayen 0–6 VfB Stuttgart
- Biggest defeat: VfB Stuttgart 2–4 FC Nürnberg
Home colours	Away colours

The 2004–05 season was the 112th in the history of VfB Stuttgart and their 28th consecutive season in the top flight. The club participated in the Bundesliga and the DFB-Pokal.

== Players ==
Note: Flags indicate national team as defined under FIFA eligibility rules; some limited exceptions apply. Players may hold more than one non-FIFA nationality.

No.	Pos.	Nation	Player
—	GK	GER	Timo Hildebrand
—	GK	GER	Dirk Heinen
—	GK	SUI	Diego Benaglio
—	DF	GER	Andreas Hinkel
—	DF	GER	Martin Stranzl
—	DF	CRO	Boris Živković
—	DF	GER	Markus Babbel
—	DF	POR	Fernando Meira
—	DF	FRA	Matthieu Delpierre
—	DF	GER	Philipp Lahm
—	DF	GER	Steffen Dangelmayr

No.	Pos.	Nation	Player
—	FW	GER	Marco Streller
—	FW	BRA	Cacau
—	FW	HUN	Imre Szabics
—	FW	GER	Kevin Kurányi
—	FW	GER	Mario Gomez

== Competitions ==
=== Overall record ===
Competition	First match	Last match	Starting round	Final position	Record							
Competition	First match	Last match	Starting round	Final position	Pld	W	D	L	GF	GA	GD	Win %
Bundesliga	8 August 2004	21 May 2005	Matchday 1	5th	34	17	7	10	54	40	+14	50.00
DFB-Pokal	21 August 2004	10 November 2004	First round	Round of 16	3	2	0	1	8	3	+5	66.67
UEFA Cup	16 September 2004	24 February 2005	First round	Round of 32	8	5	1	2	17	6	+11	62.50
Total					45	24	8	13	79	49	+30	53.33

Source: Competitions

=== Bundesliga ===
==== League table ====
Pos	Team	Pld	W	D	L	GF	GA	GD	Pts	Qualification or relegation
3	Werder Bremen	34	18	5	11	68	37	+31	59	Qualification to Champions League third qualifying round
4	Hertha BSC	34	15	13	6	59	31	+28	58	Qualification to UEFA Cup first round (Note: Since DFB Cup winners Bayern Munich and finalists Schalke 04 both qualified for the Champions League, the UEFA Cup place for the cup-winners was given to 6th placed Bayer Leverkusen.)
5	VfB Stuttgart	34	17	7	10	54	40	+14	58	Qualification to UEFA Cup first round
6	Bayer Leverkusen	34	16	9	9	65	44	+21	57	Qualification to UEFA Cup first round
7	Borussia Dortmund	34	15	10	9	47	44	+3	55	Qualification to Intertoto Cup third round

Rules for classification: 1) points; 2) goal difference; 3) number of goals scored.

==== Results summary ====
Overall								Home						Away					
Pld	W	D	L	GF	GA	GD	Pts	W	D	L	GF	GA	GD	W	D	L	GF	GA	GD
34	17	7	10	54	40	+14	58	12	2	3	34	15	+19	5	5	7	20	25	−5

Source: DFB

==== Results by round ====
Round	1	2	3	4	5	6	7	8	9	10	11	12	13	14	15	16	17	18	19	20	21	22	23	24	25	26	27	28	29	30	31	32	33	34
Ground	H	A	A	H	A	H	A	H	A	H	A	H	A	H	A	H	A	A	H	H	A	H	A	H	A	H	A	H	A	H	A	H	A	H
Result	W	D	W	W	D	W	W	W	L	L	L	W	L	W	D	W	D	W	L	D	L	W	D	W	W	W	W	W	L	D	L	W	L	L
Position	1	2	2	1	2	2	2	1	2	2	3	3	4	4	3	3	3	3	3	3	5	5	6	4	3	3	3	3	3	3	3	3	3	5

Source: DFB
A = Away; H = Home; W = Win; D = Draw; L = Loss

==== Matches ====
8 August 2004 1	VfB Stuttgart	4–2	Mainz 05	Stuttgart
CEST (UTC+2)				Stadium: Gottlieb-Daimler-Stadion

14 August 2004 2	1. FC Nürnberg	1–1	VfB Stuttgart	Nuremberg
CEST (UTC+2)

28 August 2004 3	1. FC Kaiserslautern	2–3	VfB Stuttgart	Kaiserslautern
CEST (UTC+2)

11 September 2004 4	VfB Stuttgart	2–0	Hamburger SV	Stuttgart
CEST (UTC+2)				Stadium: Gottlieb-Daimler-Stadion

19 September 2004 5	Hertha BSC	0–0	VfB Stuttgart	Berlin
CEST (UTC+2)

25 September 2004 6	VfB Stuttgart	3–0	Bayer Leverkusen	Stuttgart
CEST (UTC+2)				Stadium: Gottlieb-Daimler-Stadion

3 October 2004 7	Arminia Bielefeld	0–2	VfB Stuttgart	Bielefeld
CEST (UTC+2)

16 October 2004 8	VfB Stuttgart	2–0	Borussia Dortmund	Stuttgart
CEST (UTC+2)				Stadium: Gottlieb-Daimler-Stadion

24 October 2004 9	SC Freiburg	2–0	VfB Stuttgart	Freiburg
CEST (UTC+2)

27 October 2004 10	VfB Stuttgart	1–2	Werder Bremen	Stuttgart
CEST (UTC+2)				Stadium: Gottlieb-Daimler-Stadion

30 October 2004 11	Schalke 04	3–2	VfB Stuttgart	Gelsenkirchen
CEST (UTC+2)

7 November 2004 12	VfB Stuttgart	4–0	Hansa Rostock	Stuttgart
CEST (UTC+2)				Stadium: Gottlieb-Daimler-Stadion

13 November 2004 13	VfL Wolfsburg	3–0	VfB Stuttgart	Wolfsburg
CEST (UTC+2)

20 November 2004 14	VfB Stuttgart	1–0	Borussia Mönchengladbach	Stuttgart
CEST (UTC+2)				Stadium: Gottlieb-Daimler-Stadion

28 November 2004 15	Hannover 96	0–0	VfB Stuttgart	Hanover
CEST (UTC+2)

4 December 2004 16	VfB Stuttgart	5–2	VfL Bochum	Stuttgart
CEST (UTC+2)				Stadium: Gottlieb-Daimler-Stadion

11 December 2004 17	Bayern Munich	2–2	VfB Stuttgart	Munich
CEST (UTC+2)

22 January 2005 18	Mainz	2–3	VfB Stuttgart	Mainz
CEST (UTC+2)

29 January 2005 19	VfB Stuttgart	2–4	1. FC Nürnberg	Stuttgart
CEST (UTC+2)				Stadium: Gottlieb-Daimler-Stadion

5 February 2005 20	VfB Stuttgart	1–1	1. FC Kaiserslautern	Stuttgart
CEST (UTC+2)				Stadium: Gottlieb-Daimler-Stadion

12 February 2005 21	Hamburger SV	2–1	VfB Stuttgart	Hamburg
CEST (UTC+2)

20 February 2005 22	VfB Stuttgart	1–0	Hertha BSC	Stuttgart
CEST (UTC+2)				Stadium: Gottlieb-Daimler-Stadion

27 February 2005 23	Bayer Leverkusen	1–1	VfB Stuttgart	Leverkusen
CEST (UTC+2)

5 March 2005 24	VfB Stuttgart	2–1	Arminia Bielefeld	Stuttgart
CEST (UTC+2)				Stadium: Gottlieb-Daimler-Stadion

13 March 2005 25	Borussia Dortmund	0–2	VfB Stuttgart	Dortmund
CEST (UTC+2)

20 March 2005 26	VfB Stuttgart	1–0	SC Freiburg	Stuttgart
CEST (UTC+2)				Stadium: Gottlieb-Daimler-Stadion

2 April 2005 27	Werder Bremen	1–2	VfB Stuttgart	Bremen
CEST (UTC+2)

9 April 2005 28	VfB Stuttgart	3–0	Schalke 04	Stuttgart
CEST (UTC+2)				Stadium: Gottlieb-Daimler-Stadion

16 April 2005 29	Hansa Rostock	2–1	VfB Stuttgart	Rostock
CEST (UTC+2)

23 April 2005 30	VfB Stuttgart	0–0	VfL Wolfsburg	Stuttgart
CEST (UTC+2)				Stadium: Gottlieb-Daimler-Stadion

30 April 2005 31	Borussia Mönchengladbach	2–0	VfB Stuttgart	Mönchengladbach
CEST (UTC+2)

7 May 2005 32	VfB Stuttgart	1–0	Hannover 96	Stuttgart
CEST (UTC+2)				Stadium: Gottlieb-Daimler-Stadion

14 May 2005 33	VfL Bochum	2–0	VfB Stuttgart	Bochum
CEST (UTC+2)

21 May 2005 34	VfB Stuttgart	1–3	Bayern Munich	Stuttgart
CEST (UTC+2)				Stadium: Gottlieb-Daimler-Stadion

=== DFB-Pokal ===
21 August 2004 First round	TuS Mayen	0–6	VfB Stuttgart	Mayen
CEST (UTC+2)				Stadium: Nettetal-Stadion; Attendance: 6,500; Referee: Detlef Scheppe

22 September 2004 Round of 32	Rot-Weiß Oberhausen	0–2	VfB Stuttgart	Oberhausen
19:00 CEST (UTC+2)				Stadium: Niederrheinstadion; Attendance: 7,420; Referee: Tobias Welz

10 November 2004 Round of 16	Bayern Munich	3–0	VfB Stuttgart	Munich
CEST (UTC+2)				Stadium: Olympiastadion
