= Mario Gómez =

German association football player

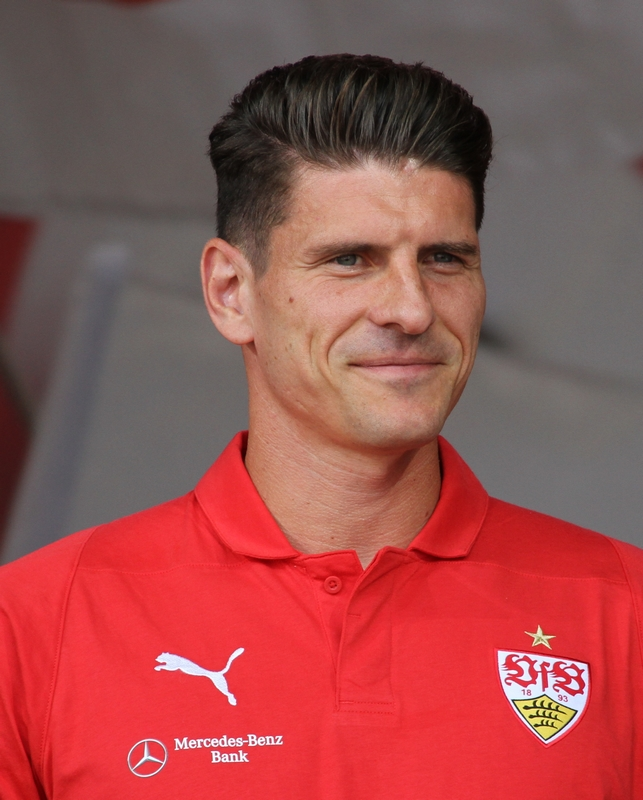
- Gómez with VfB Stuttgart in 2018

Personal information
- Full name: Mario Gómez García
- Date of birth: 10 July 1985 (age 41)
- Place of birth: Riedlingen, West Germany
- Height: 1.89 m (6 ft 2 in)
- Position: Striker

Youth career
- 1990–1998: SV Unlingen
- 1998–2000: FV Bad Saulgau
- 2000–2001: SSV Ulm 1846
- 2001–2003: VfB Stuttgart

Senior career*
Years	Team	Apps	(Gls)
2003–2005	VfB Stuttgart II	43	(21)
2003–2009	VfB Stuttgart	121	(63)
2009–2013	Bayern Munich	115	(75)
2013–2016	Fiorentina	29	(7)
2015–2016	→ Beşiktaş (loan)	33	(26)
2016–2018	VfL Wolfsburg	45	(17)
2018–2020	VfB Stuttgart	70	(22)
Total		456	(231)

International career
1999	Germany U15	3	(1)
2000–2001	Germany U17	14	(5)
2002	Germany U18	4	(0)
2002–2003	Germany U19	19	(11)
2004	Germany U20	8	(2)
2005–2006	Germany U21	9	(1)
2005	Germany B	2	(1)
2007–2018	Germany	78	(31)
Medal record
Representing Germany
FIFA World Cup
Third place	2010 South Africa
UEFA European Championship
Runner-up	2008 Austria–Switzerland
Bronze medal – third place	2012 Poland–Ukraine
- * Club domestic league appearances and goals

Mario Gómez García (German pronunciation: [ˈmaːʁi̯oː ˈɡɔmɛs]; born 10 July 1985) is a German former professional footballer who played as a striker. He represented the Germany national team over a period of 11 years between 2007 and 2018.

Gómez began his professional career with VfB Stuttgart. When the team won the Bundesliga in 2006–07, Gómez contributed 14 goals and 7 assists and was selected as German Footballer of the Year. In 2009, he signed for Bayern Munich for an estimated €30–35 million, a league record at the time. With Bayern, Gómez was the Bundesliga top scorer in 2011 and helped the team win seven trophies, including the UEFA Champions League in 2013. He left for Serie A team Fiorentina in 2013 and was affected by injury during his time in Italy. Gómez was loaned to Turkey's Beşiktaş in 2015 and was top scorer as the club won the Süper Lig. He subsequently returned to Germany by joining Bundesliga side VfL Wolfsburg for the 2016–17 season, helping them avoid relegation. He rejoined Stuttgart the season after, helping them achieve promotion to the Bundesliga after the 2019–20 campaign.

Gómez made his international debut for Germany in February 2007 and was included in their squads for three UEFA European Championships and two FIFA World Cups, finishing as top scorer at UEFA Euro 2012. He retired from international football in 2018.

== Club career ==
=== Stuttgart ===
Gómez played for VfB Stuttgart II in the Regionalliga Süd in the 2003–04 and 2004–05 seasons. He scored six goals in 19 appearances during the 2003–04 season and 15 goals in 24 appearances in the 2004–05 season.

On 9 March 2004, Gómez played ten minutes for Stuttgart in the Champions League first knock-out round against Chelsea and made his debut in the Bundesliga on 8 May, coming on for Imre Szabics in a 2–1 loss to Hamburger SV. These were his only two appearances for the first team during the 2003–04 season. He went on to make eight league appearances, one DFB-Pokal appearance, and one UEFA Cup appearance.

In the 2005–06 season, Gómez joined the first team permanently. He played in 30 matches in the Bundesliga, scoring six times. His first goal came on 17 September 2005, the winner in a 2–1 defeat of Mainz 05. Gómez also played five times in the UEFA Cup, scoring twice, and played three times in both the DFB-Pokal and DFL-Ligapokal.

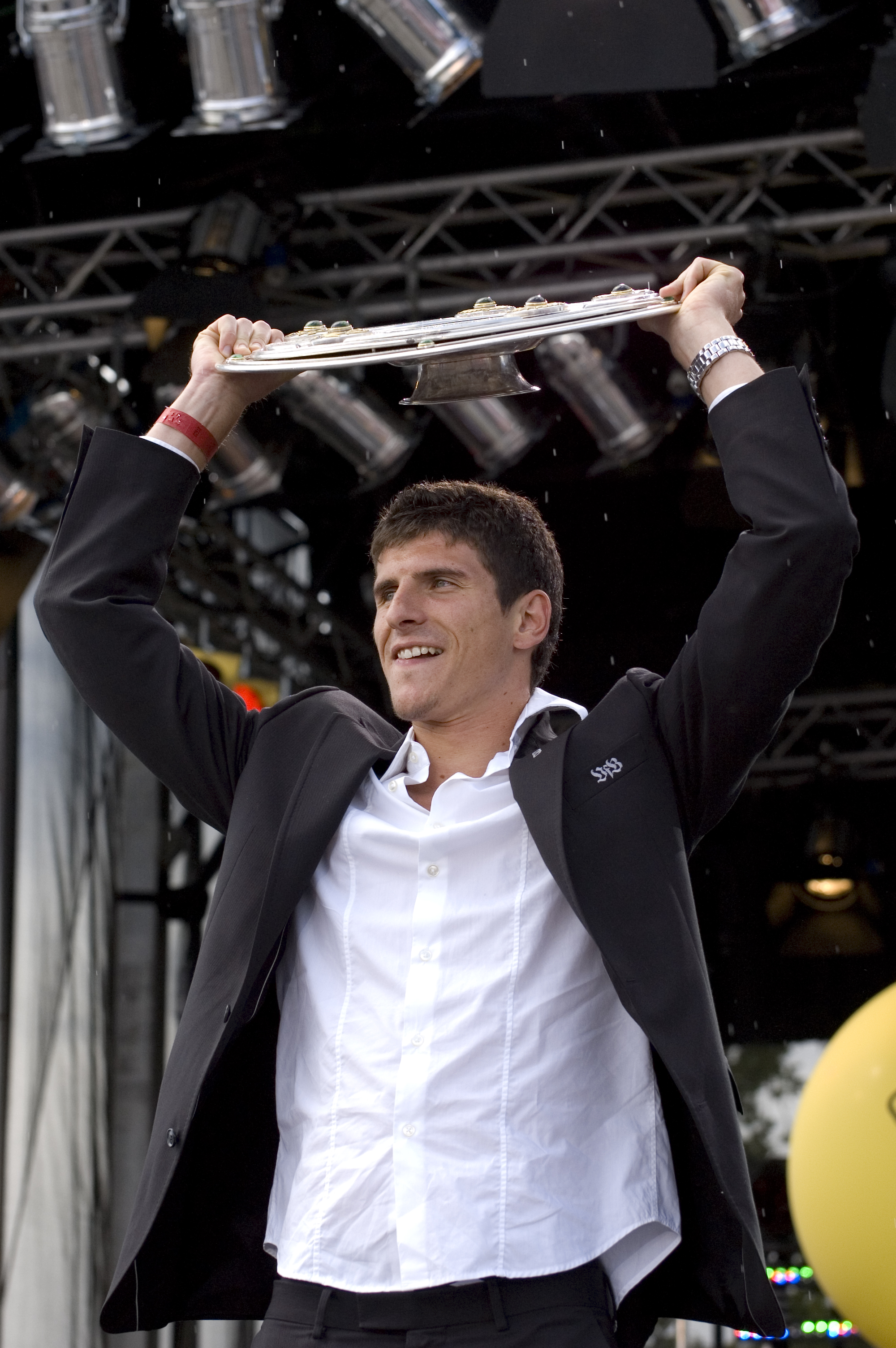
Gómez celebrates winning the Bundesliga with VfB Stuttgart in 2007.

In the 2006–07 season, Gómez established himself as one of the top scorers in the Bundesliga. However, he broke his hand on 10 March 2007 and suffered a torn ligament in his left knee. He made his comeback on 12 May 2007 and immediately scored after coming on from the bench. In that match, Stuttgart defeated VfL Bochum (3–2) and went two points clear heading into the Bundesliga's final weekend, where they won at home against Energie Cottbus, thus becoming German champions. Stuttgart also reached the final of the DFB-Pokal, where Gómez participated, but Stuttgart lost to 1. FC Nürnberg. He finished the season with 14 goals in 25 league appearances and two goals in five DFB-Pokal appearances. After the season, he was named German Footballer of the Year for 2007 and extended his contract at Stuttgart until 2012.

In the 2007–08 season, Gómez scored 19 goals in 25 appearances, elevating him to second in the Bundesliga's top scorer list, just behind Bayern Munich's Luca Toni, who scored 24 times. In the DFB-Pokal, Gómez was the top scorer with six goals. Because of his development, many clubs became interested in the then-23-year-old forward. Gómez gained the nickname "Mr. Zuverlässig" ("Mr. Reliable"), as seen in his second of three goals in a 6–3 win against Bundesliga rival Werder Bremen, where he managed to net in a virtually unreachable pass by teammate Yıldıray Baştürk. On 9 May 2009, Gómez hit four goals in a 4–1 victory over Bundesliga champions VfL Wolfsburg. He also had six goals in three DFB-Pokal appearances and three goals in four UEFA Champions League appearances.

The 2008–09 season was his last in a Stuttgart uniform, as he transferred to Bayern Munich after the season. During the season, he scored 24 goals in 32 league appearances, three goals in two DFB-Pokal appearances, and eight goals in ten UEFA Cup appearances.

=== Bayern Munich ===
==== 2009–2011 ====
On 26 May 2009, Gómez transferred to Bayern Munich for a Bundesliga record transfer fee, signing a four-year contract. The reported amount of the transfer fee varies from €30–35 million, depending on different sources. Gómez scored ten league goals and one Champions League goal in his first season for Bayern. In the DFB-Pokal, Gómez was more prolific, with three goals in four matches.

After an erratic first season at Bayern with 10 goals in 29 league appearances, Gómez established himself as a starter during the 2010–11 season (to an extent at the expense of Miroslav Klose and due to an injury sustained by Ivica Olić) and finished as top goalscorer in the Bundesliga with 28 goals. He scored his 100th Bundesliga goal with his third strike in a 1–8 away victory over FC St. Pauli on 7 May 2011; the hat-trick was his fifth in the Bundesliga in the 2010–11 season and his sixth overall after a hat-trick against CFR Cluj in the Champions League. Gómez scored 13 hat-tricks in his Bundesliga career, three with VfB Stuttgart and ten with Bayern. Gómez also netted eight times in the Champions League and finished second in the season's top scorers, tied with Samuel Eto'o, although Bayern was eliminated in the round of 16 by Inter Milan. Gómez scored 39 goals in all competitions in his second season with the Bavarian club.

==== 2011–12 season ====
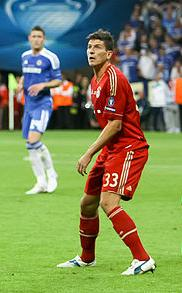
Gómez with Bayern Munich in the 2012 UEFA Champions League Final

Gómez scored his first league goal of the 2011–12 season on 20 August 2011 in Bayern's win over Hamburger SV. Seven days later, Gómez scored a hat-trick away against 1. FC Kaiserslautern. On 10 September, Gómez scored four goals as Bayern beat SC Freiburg 7–0, sealing four straight wins for the Bavarians and a return to the top of the Bundesliga table. Gómez' two first-half goals on 27 September helped Bayern defeat Manchester City 2–0 in the group stage of the Champions League.

Gómez scored his second brace of the Bundesliga campaign against Hertha BSC when Bayern won 4–0, followed by another brace on 29 October when Bayern defeated 1. FC Nürnberg 4–0. On 11 December 2011, he scored his third brace of the season and sealed Bayern's 2–1 win over southern rivals VfB Stuttgart, his former club. On 2 November 2011, he scored a hat-trick in a Champions League group stage match against Napoli. Bayern went on to win the game 3–2. In the DFB-Pokal, Gómez contributed two goals. Gómez's 40th goal of the calendar year of 2011 came on 16 December 2011 against 1. FC Köln.

On 10 January, when FC Bayern Munich visited India to play in a farewell match for Indian footballer Baichung Bhutia, Gomez scored the opening goal for Bayern as Bayern Munich won 4–0 over the India national football team.

On 13 March 2012, during the second leg of their Champions League tie against Basel, Bayern Munich overturned their 0–1 away loss as Gómez netted four of Bayern's seven goals, firing the Bavarians through to the quarter-finals 7–1 on aggregate. In the quarter-finals, Bayern faced French Ligue 1 side Olympique de Marseille; in the first leg on 28 March, Gómez fired in his 11th Champions League goal of the campaign in a 2–0 win for the Bavarians.

On 4 April, Gómez signed a new contract with Bayern Munich, keeping him at the club until the summer of 2016. Gómez scored the winning goal in Bayern's 2–1 victory over Real Madrid in the first leg of their semi-final clash. Bayern went on to win the tie 3–1 on penalties after the teams were deadlocked 3–3 on aggregate. On 19 May 2012, Gómez played in the Champions League final against Chelsea. He failed to find the net in regular time in the game but scored in the penalty shoot-out as Bayern fell at the final hurdle, losing 4–3 on penalties after a 1–1 finish. Gómez finished the 2011–12 season with 26 goals in 33 league appearances, two goals in five DFB-Pokal appearances, and 13 goals in 14 Champions League appearances.

==== 2012–13 season ====
Gómez came back late to the squad after having ankle surgery post UEFA Euro 2012. Because of his injury and the signing of Croatian striker Mario Mandžukić from VfL Wolfsburg, Gómez was relegated to the bench as Mandžukić hit a run of form that made him the Bundesliga's top scorer.

Gómez returned to action on 20 November 2012 in the club's 1–1 draw with Valencia in the group stage of the Champions League, coming on as a 79th minute substitute for winger Franck Ribéry. The striker scored his first goal within a minute of his Bundesliga season debut, capping off a 5–0 victory over Hannover 96 on 24 November. On 5 December, Gómez opened the scoring for the hosts in their final group game of the Champions League, a 4–1 defeat of BATE Borisov, which secured the Bavarians top spot in the group over Valencia.

Following the winter break, Gómez pushed for a first-team berth, scoring two goals and setting up another as Bayern cruised past Werder Bremen 6–1 on 23 February 2013. The game was his manager Jupp Heynckes' 1,000th game as a player and coach in the Bundesliga. The striker was a used substitute against Eintracht Frankfurt on 6 April, as a lone Bastian Schweinsteiger strike confirmed an 11th successive victory and a 23rd national title for the club. It was Gómez's second title win with Bayern, and his third overall.

On 16 April, in the DFB-Pokal semi-final against VfL Wolfsburg, Gómez scored a six-minute hat-trick after being substituted on in the 77th minute, rounding off a comfortable 6–1 victory and securing a spot in the final against southern rivals and former club Stuttgart. In the club's next league match, on 20 April, Bayern managed another 6–1 victory and Gómez recorded a second brace in four days to lift Bayern to a 26th league victory of the campaign, a new Bundesliga record. Gómez led the line in the absence of Mario Mandžukić in the semi-finals of the Champions League on 23 April, poking home Bayern's second goal in their 4–0 first-leg defeat of Barcelona.

Despite missing the better half of the first three months of the campaign, Gómez still managed 11 Bundesliga strikes, placing him as third top-scorer in the league for the club. He made an appearance as a late substitute in Bayern's 2–1 Champions League final victory over German rivals Borussia Dortmund on 25 May at Wembley Stadium in London. He scored a second-half brace in the DFB-Pokal final on 1 June as Bayern defeated Gómez's former club Stuttgart 3–2 at the Olympiastadion in Berlin. The win secured a 16th DFB-Pokal trophy and an unprecedented league, cup and European cup treble for the Bavarians. Gómez finished the 2012–13 season with 11 goals in 21 league appearances.

On 6 June 2013, Gómez's consultant Uli Ferber announced that it "is quite clear that he will separate from Bayern" as he had fallen behind Mario Mandžukić in the pecking order for starting striker.

=== Fiorentina ===
On 8 July 2013, Gómez signed a four-year deal for Serie A side Fiorentina for a fee believed to be around €20 million. He was officially unveiled as a Fiorentina player on 15 July to a crowd of 20,000 people. Gómez scored his first two goals for la Viola in a 5–2 defeat of Genoa on 1 September. In the following match, a 1–1 draw with Cagliari, Gómez sustained an injury which kept him out of the team until Fiorentina's match against Internazionale on 15 February 2014. On 13 March, Gómez scored his first European goal for Fiorentina in a 1–1 draw against Juventus in the first leg of a UEFA Europa League round of 16 tie. Three days later, he scored his first goal at the Stadio Artemio Franchi in a 3–1 win against Chievo. Gómez damaged the ligaments in his left knee on 23 March in a 1–0 win at Napoli and was later ruled out for the remainder of the season by Fiorentina manager Vincenzo Montella. During the 2013–14 season, he scored three goals in nine league appearances and one goal in six Europa League appearances. Gómez scored twice in Fiorentina's 3–1 win over Atalanta in the last 16 of the Coppa Italia on 21 January 2015, and followed this up with another brace 13 days later in a 2–0 quarter-final win away against Roma. He finished the 2014–15 season with 4 goals in 20 league appearances, four goals in four Coppa Italia appearances and two goals in eight Europa League appearances.

=== Loan to Beşiktaş ===
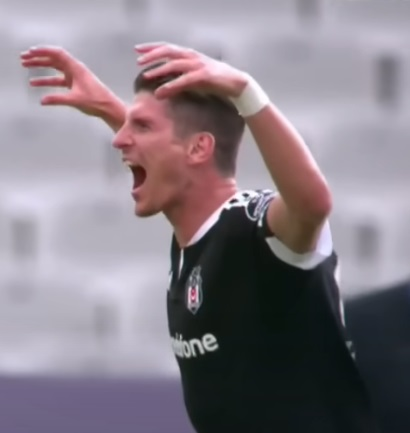
Gómez playing for Beşiktaş in 2015

On 30 July 2015, Gómez joined Beşiktaş on a season long loan contract from Fiorentina for 2015–16 Süper Lig, with a buy option. The contract consisted of €3.50 million of seasonal wages. He successfully completed a medical test on 31 July 2015. Gómez officially signed for the club along with 4 other new players, including his compatriot Andreas Beck, at a press conference held on 7 August 2015. He chose number 33 for his shirt.

Gómez made his Süper Lig debut on 16 August 2015 against Mersin İdman Yurdu at Mersin Arena, when he was substituted on for Oğuzhan Özyakup in the 73rd minute. The game ended 5–2 in favour of Beşiktaş. Gómez scored both goals as Beşiktaş beat Medipol Başakşehir 2–0 at the Atatürk Olympic Stadium on 13 September 2015 in gameweek 4. On 21 September 2015, during the week 5 game against Gençlerbirliği, Gómez reportedly narrowly escaped a red card for an alleged deliberate elbow on Icelandic midfielder Ólafur Ingi Skúlason during the 55th minute. On 27 September 2015, Gómez scored two goals during the derby game against Fenerbahçe. Beşiktaş won 3–2 and went to the top of the Süper Lig standings.

Gómez scored twice during the week 7 game against Eskişehirspor at New Eskişehir Stadium, which ended 2–1. By end of week 7 of the Süper Lig, Gómez had scored six goals with a shooting accuracy of 50%, with six successful shots out of twelve. Gómez scored the equaliser during week 3 of Beşiktaş' Group H game against Lokomotiv Moscow, which ended 1–1 at Lokomotiv Stadium, Moscow, on 22 October 2015. Gómez scored the third goal in Beşiktaş' week nine game against Antalyaspor, helping secure a 5–1 win.

During Beşiktaş' week 12 game against Sivasspor, Gómez scored the first goal of the game via a 44th minute penalty kick; the game ended 2–0.

On 5 December 2015, Gómez scored against Kayserispor in a 2–1 win for Beşiktaş. On 10 December 2015, Gómez scored Beşiktaş' only goal against Sporting in the Europa League Group Stage as the game ended 3–1 for the Portuguese side. Beşiktaş were eventually eliminated from the competition. On 14 December 2015, Gómez scored Beşiktaş' first goal with a diving header in the derby game against Galatasaray that ended 2–1 for Beşiktaş. During week 16, Gómez opened the scoring tally for Beşiktaş while they were 2–0 down against Osmanlıspor; the game ended 3–2 in favour of Beşiktaş. On 28 December 2015, Gómez scored the 2nd goal of the week 17 encounter against Konyaspor, which ended in a 4–0 win. Gómez, along with Samuel Eto'o, was the top scorer of the first half of the Super Lig, with 13 goals; Gómez completed the first half of the season with highest shooting accuracy, with 29 shots on target. He also scored two goals in the UEFA Europa League by the end of 2015.

In the Süper Lig week 20 game against Gaziantepspor, Gómez scored twice as Beşiktaş achieved a comfortable 4–0 win. Gómez added another goal to his tally in the 64th minute in Beşiktaş' week 22 game against Gençlerbirliği and secured a 1–0 win. Gómez scored twice against Eskişehirspor during the game on 7 March 2016, which ended 3–1 for Beşiktaş. His tally of 19 Süper Lig goals equalised the club record for "most scoring foreign player in single Süper Lig season", along with Pascal Nouma and Demba Ba.

Beşiktaş and Trabzonspor faced each other in a rescheduled week 19 game on 14 March 2016. Gómez scored the first goal in a 2–0 win. Gómez scored the first goal ever scored in Beşiktaş' newly built Vodafone Arena in the 22nd minute of the encounter against Bursaspor during the 2015–16 season. The game ended 3–2 as Beşiktaş recorded their first win in this stadium. This was Gómez's 21st goal of the 2015–16 season.

Gómez continued to produce goals in May 2016. He scored once more in the Istanbul derby versus Galatasaray in the 76th minute, which sealed a final score of 1–0 for Beşiktaş in week 32. Gómez scored again in the week 33 game against Osmanlıspor. It was the fifth consecutive Süper Lig game in which he had scored and his last league goal for Beşiktaş as the game ended 3–1. This goal, his 28th in all competitions, made Gómez the "most scoring foreign player across all competitions in single season", beating the previous record of Demba Ba with 27 goals scored in the 2014–15 season.

Gómez became the season Süper Lig top scorer with 26 goals, ahead of Samuel Eto'o and Hugo Rodallega. He completed the season with 28 goals in 41 games played in all competitions. On 20 July 2016, Gómez announced his farewell message via his Facebook account, stating that he would not continue to play for Beşiktaş. He described it as a "difficult decision" on a political basis, which was perceived as a reference to 2016 coup d'état attempt in Turkey.

In 2016, Gómez expressed his satisfaction with his spell at Beşiktaş in an interview with German newspaper Die Welt, stating: "[My time at] Beşiktaş was a pure dream for me. It was wonderful. I had a consistent season there. It was my biggest success after 2013 Champions League title".

=== Wolfsburg ===
On 17 August 2016, Gómez returned to the Bundesliga by signing for VfL Wolfsburg. He scored his first goal for the club on 22 October, netting in a 3–1 defeat to Darmstadt 98. His goal was the 1,000th scored by Wolfsburg in the Bundesliga. On 2 April 2017, Gómez scored his first hat-trick for the club, netting three times in seven minutes as Wolfsburg came from 2–0 down to draw 3–3 with Bayer Leverkusen. His third goal on the night was his 150th goal scored in the Bundesliga. He ultimately scored 16 league goals during the 2016–17 season as Wolfsburg narrowly avoided relegation via the relegation play-offs. Gómez finished the 2016–17 season with 18 goals in 37 appearances in all competitions.

After keeping his team in the top flight, Gómez signed a new contract in June 2017. In August, manager Andries Jonker named him as captain, succeeding Diego Benaglio. Gómez scored only once in his last 15 appearances at the Volkswagen Arena.

=== Return to VfB Stuttgart ===
On 22 December 2017, it was announced that Gómez would return to VfB Stuttgart on 1 January 2018 for an undisclosed fee. He signed a contract until June 2020. He finished the 2017–18 season with eight goals in 16 appearances.

Gómez was Stuttgart's top scorer with seven goals in 2018–19. In the first leg of the play-off defeat to 1. FC Union Berlin that caused Stuttgart's relegation, Gómez scored an additional goal, becoming the first player to score for two teams in Bundesliga relegation play-offs.

On 28 June 2020, Stuttgart announced that Gómez had ended his professional career, after scoring in his final match for the club and helping them secure promotion back to the Bundesliga.

== International career ==
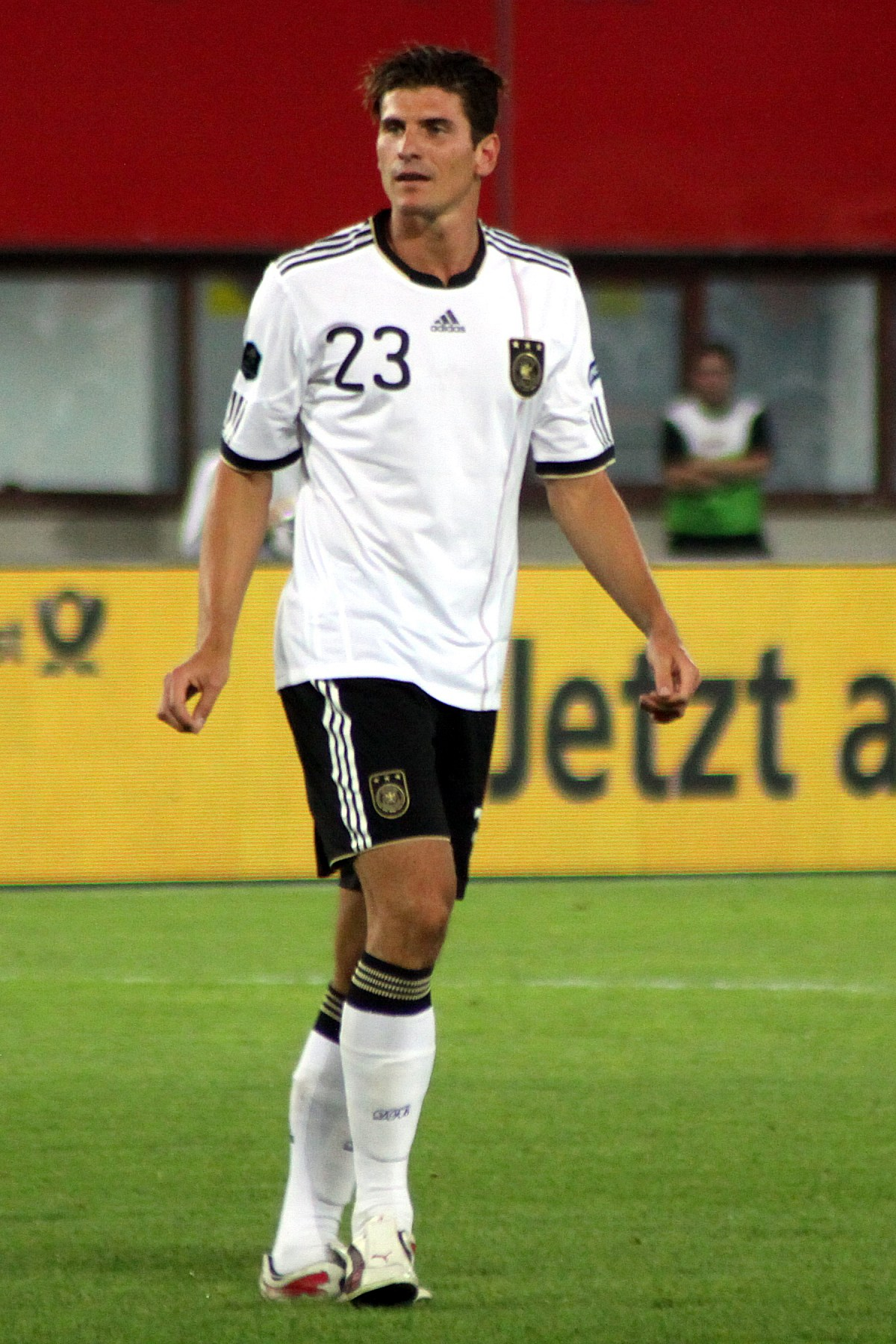
Gómez playing for Germany in 2011

Gómez has both German and Spanish citizenship, but played for all German youth national teams from age 14. He made his debut for the Germany senior team against Switzerland on 7 February 2007 in Düsseldorf. Germany won the match 3–1, with Gómez scoring Germany's second goal. Gómez gained his second cap for Germany by coming on as a substitute for Kevin Kurányi in a UEFA Euro 2008 qualifier against San Marino. He scored twice as the game ended in a 6–0 victory.

=== UEFA Euro 2008 ===
After Gómez impressed in pre-tournament friendlies, Germany head coach Joachim Löw called him up to the German squad for Euro 2008. Löw broke up the strike partnership of Lukas Podolski and Miroslav Klose, with Podolski moving out to the left wing at the expense of talismanic midfielder Bastian Schweinsteiger and Gómez partnering Klose up front. Unfortunately, Gómez was not able to reproduce his club form and missed several chances, including one in the last group match against Austria, a performance for which he was criticized by the German media and many fans of the national team. Germany eventually won courtesy of a Michael Ballack free-kick to seal a place in the knockout stages, but Löw dropped Gómez to the bench and reverted to the Podolski–Klose partnership. Gómez was an unused substitute in the quarter-final and semi-final and later came off the bench in the final of Euro 2008 for Klose, but could not prevent Germany from losing 1–0 to Spain on 29 June.

=== 2010 FIFA World Cup ===
In a friendly match against the United Arab Emirates played on 2 June 2009, Gómez scored four goals in Germany's 7–2 victory, ending his 15-game goal drought for the national team.

Gómez was named as one of the six forwards in Joachim Löw's 23-man squad for the 2010 FIFA World Cup in South Africa. He featured in four out of seven German matches at the World Cup, all from the substitutes' bench; he played against Australia, replacing Mesut Özil in the 73rd minute; Serbia, coming on for left back Holger Badstuber in the 77th minute; England, coming on for Miroslav Klose in the 72nd minute; and Spain, replacing defensive midfielder Sami Khedira in the 80th minute. However, Gómez again did not score a goal at a major tournament.

=== UEFA Euro 2012 ===
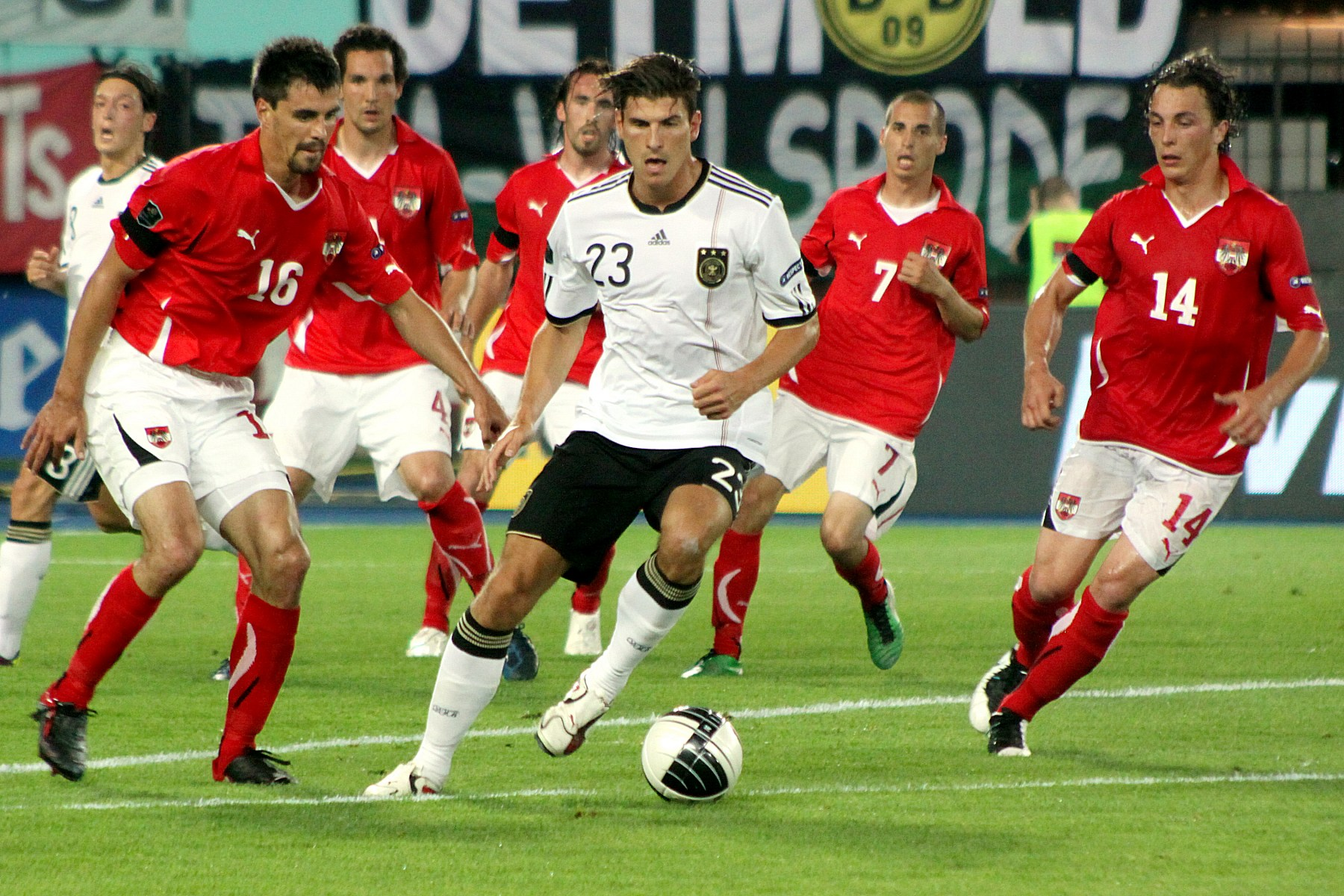
Gómez against Austria in a UEFA Euro 2012 qualification match

Despite being second choice, behind Miroslav Klose, for centre-forward during Germany's qualification for Euro 2012, Gómez played regularly and contributed goals against every opponent of that campaign: Kazakhstan, Austria, Azerbaijan, Turkey and Belgium. This included two goals against Austria in Germany's 2–1 away win in the Ernst-Happel-Stadion, scoring into the very same goal in which he had been unable to score four years earlier during Euro 2008. In a gesture of relief, he kissed the goalpost after he scored the first goal.

Prior to Euro 2012, Gómez captained Germany for the first time in a 3–3 draw against Ukraine in the first match at the renovated Olympic Stadion of Kyiv. It was his 50th international cap, and aged 26, he was Germany's oldest player in the starting lineup.

Gómez scored the only goal against Portugal in their first group match at Euro 2012, securing a 1–0 win for Germany. He then scored twice against the Netherlands in Germany's second Group B match, making it three goals in two matches. Gómez finished as second-best scorer of the tournament, behind Spain's Fernando Torres. Both had three goals and one assist; however, Torres became top scorer of the tournament because he had played fewer minutes than Gómez.

=== 2014 FIFA World Cup ===
After missing the majority of the 2013–14 season with a knee injury, Gómez was not included in Joachim Löw's squad for the 2014 World Cup which Germany went on to win.

=== UEFA Euro 2016 ===
Gómez was excluded from the national team for UEFA Euro 2016 qualifying Group D encounters against Ireland and Georgia. His performance in the first half of the 2015–16 Süper Lig led Gómez to be recalled to the national team for the first time since the international friendly against Argentina on 4 September 2014. He was included the Germany squad for friendlies against France and the Netherlands in November 2015. Gómez scored his first international goal in four years in a 2–3 loss to England in Berlin on 26 March 2016.

On 21 June 2016, Gómez was selected to start in Germany's final Euro 2016 group match against Northern Ireland; he scored the winning goal in the 30th minute. On 26 June 2016, Gómez scored in the 43rd minute in Germany's Round of 16 3–0 win against Slovakia, becoming Germany's all-time leading scorer at the UEFA European Championship with five goals.

=== 2018 FIFA World Cup ===
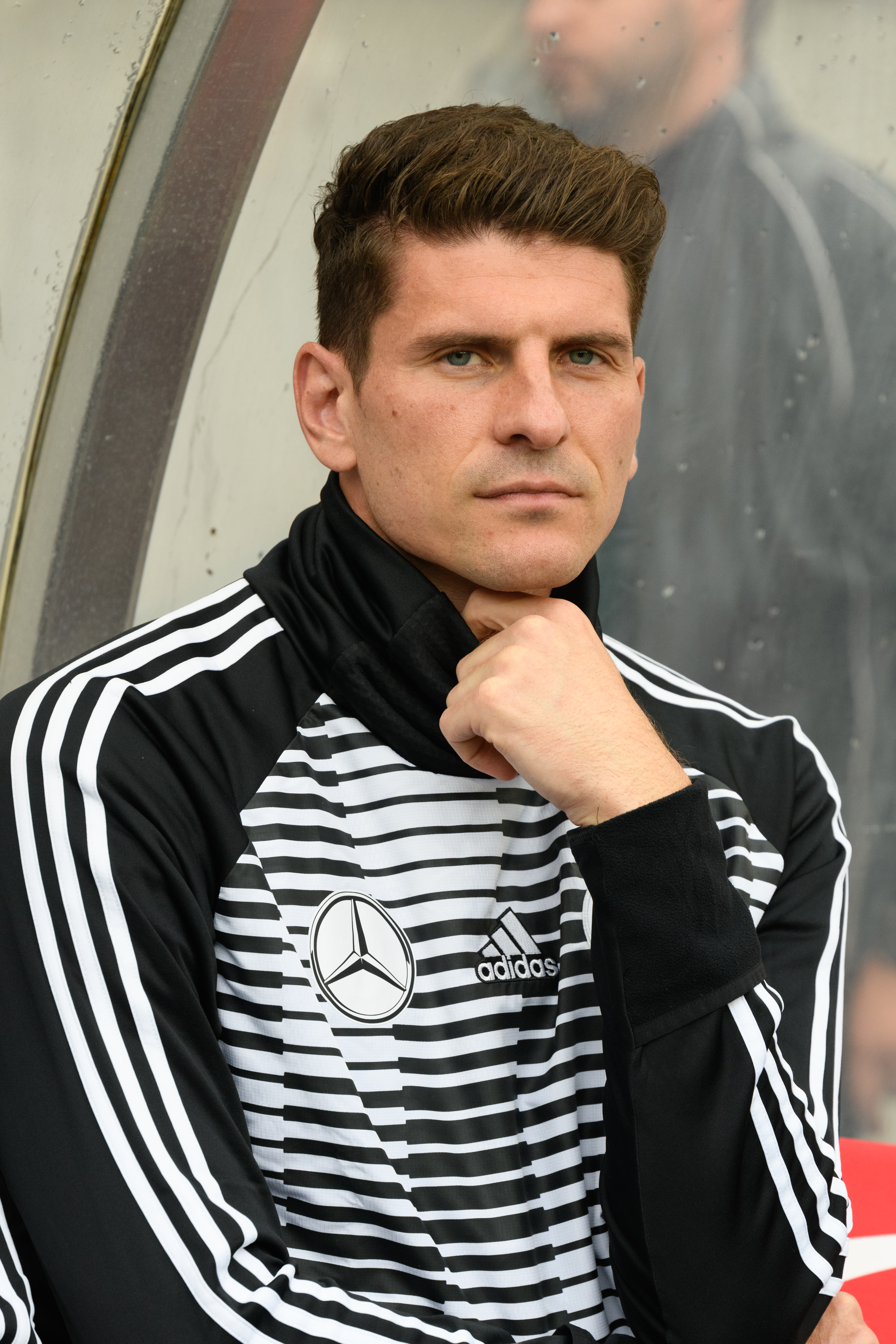
Gómez with Germany in 2018

On 4 June 2018, Gómez was selected in Joachim Löw's 23-man squad for the 2018 FIFA World Cup. He made an appearance during Germany's opening match against Mexico, coming on for Marvin Plattenhardt in the 79th minute, but the game ended in a 1–0 loss for Germany. On 24 June, Gómez provided an assist to Marco Reus' equalizing goal with his first touch during Germany's second group stage match against Sweden; the game ended in a 2–1 victory. On 5 August, he announced his retirement from international football.

== Life after football ==
Since August 2021, Gómez has been part of the UEFA Champions League expert team on Amazon Prime Video.

Since January 2022, Gómez has been working as technical director of Red Bull Soccer International and in this role is responsible for strategic planning and structural work at RB Leipzig, New York Red Bulls and Red Bull Bragantino.

== Style of play ==
During his prime, Gómez was considered one of the best strikers in world football. Throughout his career, Gómez was known for his ability to shoot with both feet and was considered an aerial threat. Additionally, his ability to anticipate crosses and passes and position himself to shoot were considered to be some of his best attributes. Arsenal manager Arsène Wenger described him as "a great finisher who is often in the right place to finish off moves". Gómez's body balance and ability to hold up the ball often created trouble for defenders. During his time at Bayern, his ability to appear "at the right place at the right time" proved to be one of Bayern's most lethal attacking weapons, as Franck Ribéry and Arjen Robben could often outrun defenders and provide a cross for Gómez. However, despite his goal-scoring abilities, Gómez was often accused of having limited skills and a poor work ethic.

== Personal life ==
Gómez was born in Riedlingen, in the state of Baden-Württemberg. He was brought up in nearby Unlingen, an Upper Swabian village in Baden-Württemberg, about 100 km (60 miles) south of Stuttgart and 175 km (110 miles) west of Munich. Gómez is of German-Spanish descent. His father, José "Pepe" Gómez García, is a Spaniard from Albuñán, Granada, and his mother, Christel Roth, is German. He has dual citizenship and opted to play for Germany.

Gómez ended his nine-year relationship with Silvia Meichel on 2 October 2012. Gómez began dating German model Carina Wanzung in December 2012. They married on 22 July 2016.

== Career statistics ==
=== Club ===
Appearances and goals by club, season and competition
Club	Season	League			National cup (Note: Includes DFB-Pokal, Coppa Italia, Turkish Cup)		Europe		Other		Total	
Club	Season	Division	Apps	Goals	Apps	Goals	Apps	Goals	Apps	Goals	Apps	Goals
VfB Stuttgart II	2003–04	Regionalliga Süd	19	6	—		—		—		19	6
VfB Stuttgart II	2004–05	Regionalliga Süd	24	15	—		—		—		24	15
VfB Stuttgart II	Total		43	21	—		—		—		43	21
VfB Stuttgart	2003–04	Bundesliga	1	0	0	0	1 (Note: Appearances in UEFA Champions League)	0	—		2	0
VfB Stuttgart	2004–05	Bundesliga	8	0	1	0	1 (Note: Appearances in UEFA Cup)	0	—		10	0
VfB Stuttgart	2005–06	Bundesliga	30	6	0	0	5	2	3 (Note: Appearances in DFL-Ligapokal)	0	38	8
VfB Stuttgart	2006–07	Bundesliga	25	14	5	2	—		—		30	16
VfB Stuttgart	2007–08	Bundesliga	25	19	3	6	4	3	0	0	32	28
VfB Stuttgart	2008–09	Bundesliga	32	24	2	3	10	8	0	0	44	35
VfB Stuttgart	Total		121	63	11	11	21	13	3	0	156	87
Bayern Munich	2009–10	Bundesliga	29	10	4	3	12	1	—		45	14
Bayern Munich	2010–11	Bundesliga	32	28	5	3	8	8	0	0	45	39
Bayern Munich	2011–12	Bundesliga	33	26	5	2	14	13	—		52	41
Bayern Munich	2012–13	Bundesliga	21	11	4	6	7	2	0	0	32	19
Bayern Munich	Total		115	75	18	14	41	24	0	0	174	113
Fiorentina	2013–14	Serie A	9	3	0	0	6 (Note: Appearances in UEFA Europa League)	1	—		15	4
Fiorentina	2014–15	Serie A	20	4	4	4	8	2	—		32	10
Fiorentina	Total		29	7	4	4	14	3	—		47	14
Beşiktaş (loan)	2015–16	Süper Lig	33	26	3	0	5	2	—		41	28
VfL Wolfsburg	2016–17	Bundesliga	33	16	2	1	—		2 (Note: Appearances in Bundesliga relegation play-offs)	1	37	18
VfL Wolfsburg	2017–18	Bundesliga	12	1	3	0	—		0	0	15	1
VfL Wolfsburg	Total		45	17	5	1	—		2	1	52	19
VfB Stuttgart	2017–18	Bundesliga	16	8	0	0	—		—		16	8
VfB Stuttgart	2018–19	Bundesliga	31	7	1	0	—		2	1	34	8
VfB Stuttgart	2019–20	2. Bundesliga	23	7	1	0	—		—		24	7
VfB Stuttgart	Total		70	22	2	0	—		2	1	74	23
Career total			456	231	43	30	81	43	6	2	587	305

=== International ===
Appearances and goals by national team and year
National team	Year	Apps	Goals
Germany
Germany	2007	7	3
Germany	2008	13	3
Germany	2009	11	5
Germany	2010	10	3
Germany	2011	9	7
Germany	2012	7	4
Germany	2013	2	0
Germany	2014	1	0
Germany	2015	1	0
Germany	2016	8	4
Germany	2017	2	2
Germany	2018	7	0
Total		78	31

Germany score listed first; score column indicates score after each Gómez goal.

List of international goals scored by Mario Gómez
No.	Date	Venue	Cap	Opponent	Score	Result	Competition
1	7 February 2007	LTU Arena, Düsseldorf, Germany	1	Switzerland	2–0	3–1	Friendly
2	2 June 2007	Frankenstadion, Nuremberg, Germany	2	San Marino	4–0	6–0	UEFA Euro 2008 qualification
3	2 June 2007	Frankenstadion, Nuremberg, Germany	2	San Marino	5–0	6–0	UEFA Euro 2008 qualification
4	6 February 2008	Ernst-Happel-Stadion, Vienna, Austria	8	Austria	3–0	3–0	Friendly
5	26 March 2008	St. Jakob-Park, Basel, Switzerland	9	Switzerland	2–0	4–0	Friendly
6	26 March 2008	St. Jakob-Park, Basel, Switzerland	9	Switzerland	3–0	4–0	Friendly
7	2 June 2009	Sheikh Zayed Stadium, Abu Dhabi, United Arab Emirates	25	United Arab Emirates	2–0	7–2	Friendly
8	2 June 2009	Sheikh Zayed Stadium, Abu Dhabi, United Arab Emirates	25	United Arab Emirates	4–0	7–2	Friendly
9	2 June 2009	Sheikh Zayed Stadium, Abu Dhabi, United Arab Emirates	25	United Arab Emirates	5–0	7–2	Friendly
10	2 June 2009	Sheikh Zayed Stadium, Abu Dhabi, United Arab Emirates	25	United Arab Emirates	7–2	7–2	Friendly
11	5 September 2009	BayArena, Leverkusen, Germany	27	South Africa	1–0	2–0	Friendly
12	29 May 2010	Ferenc Puskás Stadium, Budapest, Hungary	33	Hungary	2–0	3–0	Friendly
13	11 August 2010	Parken Stadium, Copenhagen, Denmark	39	Denmark	1–0	2–2	Friendly
14	12 October 2010	Astana Arena, Astana, Kazakhstan	40	Kazakhstan	2–0	3–0	UEFA Euro 2012 qualification
15	29 March 2011	Borussia-Park, Mönchengladbach, Germany	43	Australia	1–0	1–2	Friendly
16	29 May 2011	Rhein-Neckar-Arena, Sinsheim, Germany	44	Uruguay	1–0	2–1	Friendly
17	3 June 2011	Ernst-Happel-Stadion, Vienna, Austria	45	Austria	1–0	2–1	UEFA Euro 2012 qualification
18	3 June 2011	Ernst-Happel-Stadion, Vienna, Austria	45	Austria	2–1	2–1	UEFA Euro 2012 qualification
19	7 June 2011	Tofiq Bahramov Stadium, Baku, Azerbaijan	46	Azerbaijan	2–0	3–1	UEFA Euro 2012 qualification
20	7 October 2011	Turk Telekom Arena, Istanbul, Turkey	48	Turkey	1–0	3–1	UEFA Euro 2012 qualification
21	11 October 2011	Esprit Arena, Düsseldorf, Germany	49	Belgium	3–0	3–1	UEFA Euro 2012 qualification
22	31 May 2012	Zentralstadion, Leipzig, Germany	52	Israel	1–0	2–0	Friendly
23	9 June 2012	Arena Lviv, Lviv, Ukraine	53	Portugal	1–0	1–0	UEFA Euro 2012
24	13 June 2012	Metalist Stadium, Kharkiv, Ukraine	54	Netherlands	1–0	2–1	UEFA Euro 2012
25	13 June 2012	Metalist Stadium, Kharkiv, Ukraine	54	Netherlands	2–0	2–1	UEFA Euro 2012
26	26 March 2016	Olympiastadion, Berlin, Germany	62	England	2–0	2–3	Friendly
27	29 May 2016	WWK ARENA, Augsburg, Germany	63	Slovakia	1–0	1–3	Friendly
28	21 June 2016	Parc des Princes, Paris, France	66	Northern Ireland	1–0	1–0	UEFA Euro 2016
29	26 June 2016	Stade Pierre-Mauroy, Villeneuve-d'Ascq, France	67	Slovakia	2–0	3–0	UEFA Euro 2016
30	26 March 2017	Tofiq Bahramov Republican Stadium, Baku, Azerbaijan	70	Azerbaijan	2–1	4–1	2018 FIFA World Cup qualification
31	4 September 2017	Mercedes-Benz Arena, Stuttgart, Germany	71	Norway	6–0	6–0	2018 FIFA World Cup qualification

== Honours ==
VfB Stuttgart

- Bundesliga: 2006–07

Bayern Munich

- Bundesliga: 2009–10, 2012–13
- DFB-Pokal: 2009–10, 2012–13
- UEFA Champions League: 2012–13; runner-up: 2009–10, 2011–12

Beşiktaş

- Süper Lig: 2015–16

Germany

- UEFA European Championship runner-up: 2008; third place: 2012
- FIFA World Cup third place: 2010

Individual

- German Footballer of the Year: 2007
- UEFA European Championship top scorer: 2012
- Bundesliga top scorer: 2011
- DFB-Pokal top scorer: 2008, 2013
- Coppa Italia top scorer: 2015
- Süper Lig top scorer: 2016
- Süper Lig Team of the Season: 2015–16
- kicker Bundesliga Team of the Season: 2007–08, 2010–11, 2011–12

Orders

- Silbernes Lorbeerblatt: 2010
