= Cacau =

German footballer (born 1981)

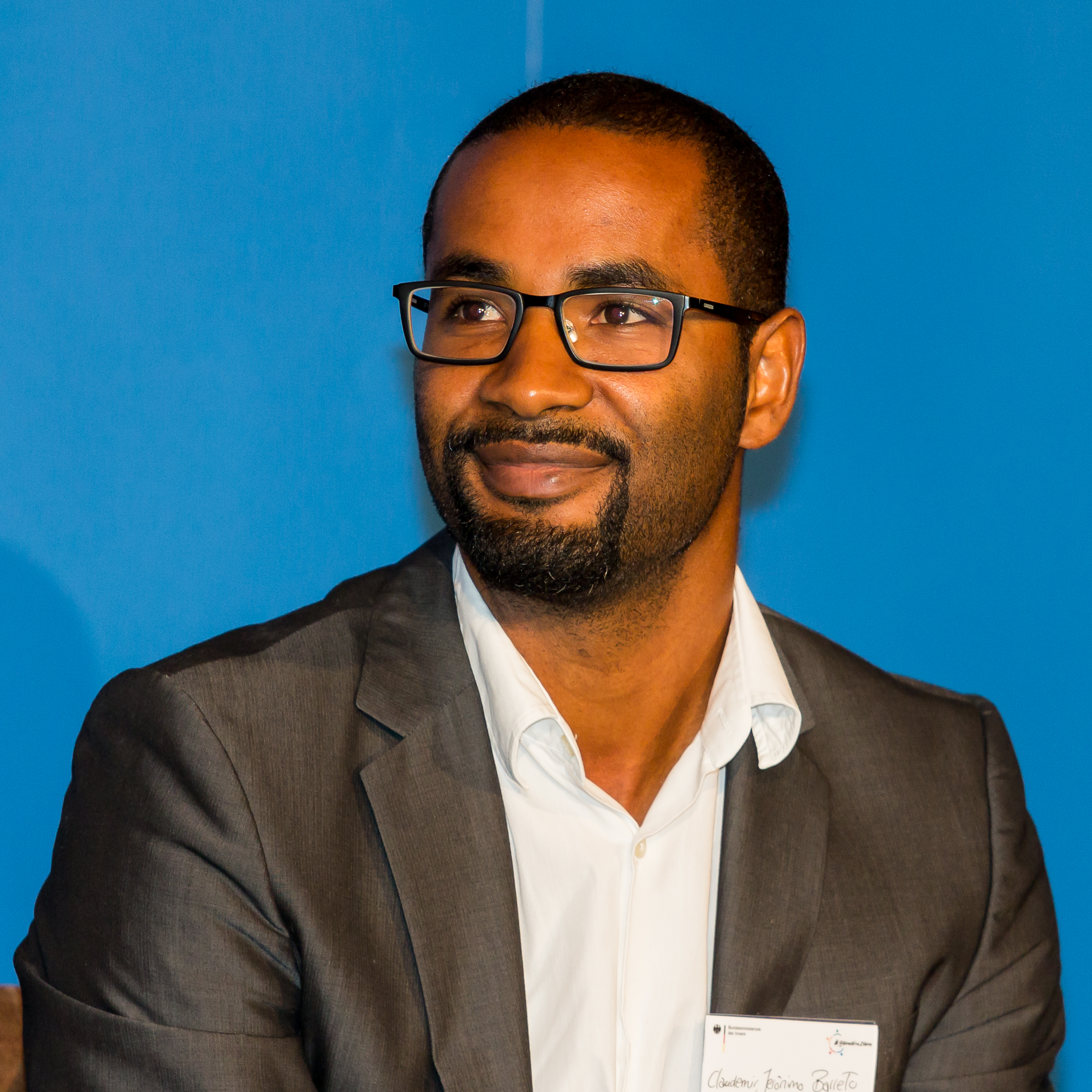
- Cacau in 2016

Personal information
- Full name: Claudemir Jerônimo Barreto
- Date of birth: 27 March 1981 (age 45)
- Place of birth: Santo André, São Paulo, Brazil
- Height: 1.79 m (5 ft 10 in)
- Position: Striker

Youth career
- 1988–1994: União Mogi
- 1994–1997: Palmeiras
- 1997: União Mogi

Senior career*
Years	Team	Apps	(Gls)
1997–1999	Nacional		
2000–2001	Türkgücü München	31	(7)
2001–2002	1. FC Nürnberg II	18	(9)
2001–2003	1. FC Nürnberg	44	(8)
2003–2014	VfB Stuttgart	263	(80)
2014–2015	Cerezo Osaka	24	(7)
2016	VfB Stuttgart II	9	(3)
Total		389	(121)

International career
2009–2012	Germany	23	(6)
Medal record
Men's football
Representing Germany
FIFA World Cup
Third place	2010 South Africa
- * Club domestic league appearances and goals

Claudemir Jerônimo Barreto (born 27 March 1981), known as Cacau (Portuguese pronunciation: [kaˈkaw], German: [kaˈkaʊ];), is a former professional footballer who played as a striker. Born in Brazil, he represented Germany at international level.

Cacau received German citizenship in February 2009 and made his international debut in May that year in a friendly match against China. He was in the Germany national team at the 2010 FIFA World Cup.

== Club career ==
=== Early career ===
Cacau's career in Germany started with fifth-division side Türkgücü München in the 1999–2000 season, after which he went on to join 1. FC Nürnberg's reserve team. Following his good performances with the reserves, he was given his Bundesliga debut against Hansa Rostock on 18 November 2001. In only his second Bundesliga match, against Bayer Leverkusen on 8 December 2001, he scored two goals in Nürnberg's 4–2 defeat. He finished his first Bundesliga season with 6 goals in 17 appearances, but failed to repeat the success the following season, when he only scored 2 goals in 27 appearances and Nürnberg were relegated.

=== VfB Stuttgart ===
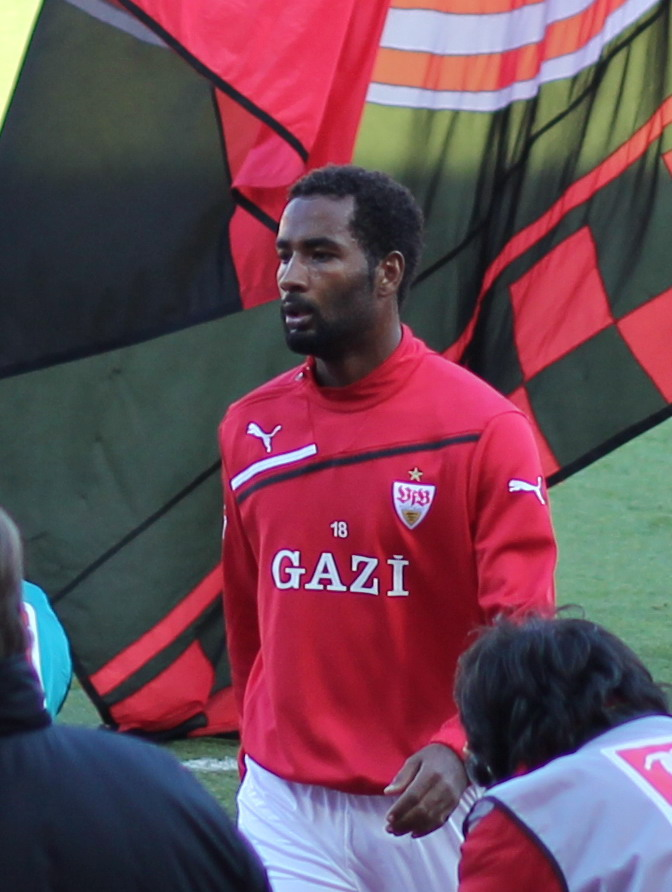
Cacau with Stuttgart in 2011

Having already signed a contract with VfB Stuttgart in January 2003, Cacau joined the club for the 2003–04 season. In his first season with Stuttgart, he also made four appearances in the UEFA Champions League In the 2004–05 season, he scored 12 Bundesliga goals and was the club's second-best goalscorer. In the first part of the same season, he also had a successful UEFA Cup campaign, netting three consecutive braces in Stuttgart's first three matches of the competition.

After an unsuccessful season in 2005–06, in which he only scored four Bundesliga goals for Stuttgart, he went on to be one of the key players in the club's run to the league title in 2007, once again becoming their second-best goalscorer with 13 goals, crucially netting both goals in their 2–0 win over Bayern Munich as well as the winning goal in a 3–2 away win over VfL Bochum in the final five rounds of the season. During the 2006–07 season, he also helped Stuttgart reach the final of the DFB-Pokal, scoring five goals in six matches, including the opening goal in the final against his former team Nürnberg. However, he was sent off 11 minutes later and Stuttgart went on to lose the final 3–2 after extra time.

In the 2007–08 season, he made further five appearances for Stuttgart in the UEFA Champions League and also scored his first goal in the competition, netting the equaliser in a 3–2 win over Rangers. He also helped the club finish sixth in the Bundesliga, netting 9 goals in 27 appearances during the season. In 2008–09, he scored 7 Bundesliga goals in 25 league matches, helping Stuttgart to finish third in the league.

On 20 February 2010, Cacau scored four goals in a 5–1 victory in an away game against 1. FC Köln. On 30 April, Cacau scored his final goal of the season in a 2–1 win away at 1899 Hoffenheim. This brought his tally to eight Bundesliga goals on the campaign. Following this, on 1 May 2010 Cacau extended his contract with VfB Stuttgart until the summer of 2013.

Cacau started the 2011–12 Bundesliga campaign in good form, scoring on a header against Schalke 04 on 6 August helping his side to a 3–0 win. He was called up to the German squad for their game against his native Brazil the following Wednesday.

On 22 March 2013, Cacau took a contract option which extended his contract with Stuttgart until June 2014.

=== Cerezo Osaka ===
On 11 August 2014, Cacau transferred to Cerezo Osaka. On 9 June 2015, he was released from his contract.

=== VfB Stuttgart II ===
On 1 February 2016, Cacau returned to Stuttgart and joined VfB Stuttgart II.

=== Retirement ===
Cacau announced his retirement from professional football on 11 October 2016.

== International career ==
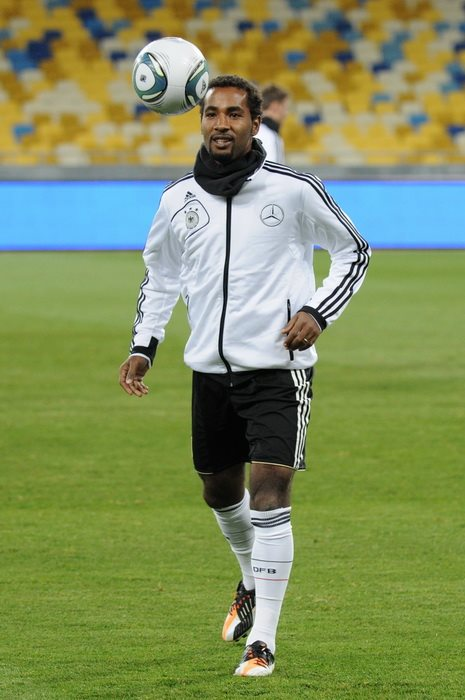
Cacau with Germany in 2011

Although Cacau was born in Brazil, he was never called up by the Brazil national team.

In February 2009, he became eligible to play for Germany after he acquired a German passport having lived and played in Germany for over eight years.

On 19 May 2009, Cacau was called up to the Germany national team's coach Joachim Löw for their friendly matches against China and the United Arab Emirates. He made his international debut on 29 May 2009 in Germany's 1–1 draw against China, playing 27 minutes as a substitute for Mario Gómez. He also appeared in Germany's 7–2 win against the UAE four days later, playing the entire second half as a substitute for Lukas Podolski and providing an assist for Mario Gómez's third and Germany's fifth goal of the match just over a minute into the second half. He opened his account with the Germany national team, scoring a brace in a 3–0 win over Malta on 13 May 2010. He scored his first International goal for Germany in the group stage of the 2010 FIFA World Cup on 13 June 2010, coming on as a substitute against Australia, and scoring in 1:52 to make it 4–0. He later received a yellow card for diving in the match. After Miroslav Klose had been sent off against Serbia, Cacau played against Ghana but could not score in the 1–0 win. In the third-place World Cup game, Germany faced Uruguay on 10 July. He started for his German side but was eventually substituted out as Germany defeated Uruguay 3–2, taking third place at the World Cup.

Cacau remained regular for Germany in the qualifications for UEFA Euro 2012 in Poland and Ukraine. After making the 30-man preliminary squad, Cacau did not make Germany's 23-man Euro 2012 squad.

== Personal life ==
Cacau's brother Vlademir Jeronimo Barreto, more commonly known as simply Vlademir, is also a former footballer and lives in Mogi das Cruzes.

Cacau is a committed Christian and says his faith is a big part of his life.

Since his naturalization as a German citizen in early 2009, Cacau's nickname at VfB Stuttgart (and later also at the Germany national team) is Helmut. This nickname was given to him by his Swiss Stuttgart teammate at the time, Ludovic Magnin, who stated that, as a German, Cacau should also have a proper German name.

In 2021, he featured in Schwarze Adler, a documentary detailing the experiences of Black players in German professional football.

== Career statistics ==
=== Club ===
Appearances and goals by club, season and competition
Club	Season	League			National cup (Note: Includes DFB-Pokal, Emperor's Cup)		League cup (Note: Includes DFL-Ligapokal)		Continental		Total	
Club	Season	Division	Apps	Goals	Apps	Goals	Apps	Goals	Apps	Goals	Apps	Goals
Türk Gücü München	2000–01	Landesliga	31	7	—		—		—		31	7
1. FC Nürnberg	2001–02	Bundesliga	17	6	0	0	—		—		17	6
1. FC Nürnberg	2002–03	Bundesliga	27	2	2	0	—		—		29	2
1. FC Nürnberg	Total		44	8	2	0	0	0	0	0	46	8
VfB Stuttgart	2003–04	Bundesliga	16	4	3	1	1	0	4 (Note: Appearances in UEFA Champions League)	0	24	5
VfB Stuttgart	2004–05	Bundesliga	32	12	3	2	2	2	8 (Note: Appearances in UEFA Cup)	7	45	23
VfB Stuttgart	2005–06	Bundesliga	20	4	1	1	3	0	5	0	29	5
VfB Stuttgart	2006–07	Bundesliga	32	13	6	5	—		—		38	18
VfB Stuttgart	2007–08	Bundesliga	27	9	1	0	1	0	5	1	34	10
VfB Stuttgart	2008–09	Bundesliga	25	7	1	1	—		6	0	32	8
VfB Stuttgart	2009–10	Bundesliga	25	13	2	2	—		6	1	33	16
VfB Stuttgart	2010–11	Bundesliga	27	8	2	2	—		7 (Note: Appearances in UEFA Europa League)	1	36	11
VfB Stuttgart	2011–12	Bundesliga	33	8	4	3	—		—		37	11
VfB Stuttgart	2012–13	Bundesliga	5	1	2	0	—		4	0	11	1
VfB Stuttgart	2013–14	Bundesliga	21	1	2	0	—		4	0	27	1
VfB Stuttgart	Total		263	80	27	17	7	2	49	10	346	109
Cerezo Osaka	2014	J1 League	12	5	2	0	0	0	—		14	5
VfB Stuttgart II	2015–16	3. Liga	8	3	—		—		—		8	3
Career total			358	103	31	17	7	2	49	10	445	132

=== International ===
Scores and results list Germany's goal tally first, score column indicates score after each Cacau goal.

List of international goals scored by Cacau
No.	Date	Venue	Opponent	Score	Result	Competition
1	13 May 2010	New Tivoli, Aachen, Germany	Malta	1–0	3–0	Friendly
2	13 May 2010	New Tivoli, Aachen, Germany	Malta	2–0	3–0	Friendly
3	29 May 2010	Stadium Puskás Ferenc, Budapest, Hungary	Hungary	3–0	3–0	Friendly
4	13 June 2010	Moses Mabhida Stadium, Durban, South Africa	Australia	4–0	4–0	FIFA World Cup 2010
5	6 September 2011	PGE Arena, Gdańsk, Poland	Poland	2–2	2–2	Friendly
6	29 February 2012	Weserstadion, Bremen, Germany	France	1–2	1–2	Friendly

== Honours ==
VfB Stuttgart

- Bundesliga: 2006–07
- DFB Pokal runner-up: 2006–07, 2012–13

Germany

- FIFA World Cup third place: 2010

Individual

- DFB-Pokal top goalscorer: 2006–07
