= Rafael (footballer, born 1979) =

Brazilian footballer

Personal information
- Full name: Rafael da Silva Santos
- Date of birth: 22 March 1979 (age 47)
- Place of birth: Rio de Janeiro, Brazil
- Height: 1.90 m (6 ft 3 in)
- Position: Defender

Youth career
- Campo Grande
- America-RJ

Senior career*
Years	Team	Apps	(Gls)
–1999	Botafogo		
1999–2000	America-RJ		
–2002	Ypiranga		
2002–2003	1860 Munich	5	(0)
2003–2004	1. FC Nürnberg	2	(0)
2004–?	Paulista		
2007	Pahang FA		

International career
- Brazil U20
- * Club domestic league appearances and goals

Rafael da Silva Santos (born 22 March 1979), known as Rafael, is a Brazilian former professional footballer who played as a defender. He spent one season in the Bundesliga with 1860 Munich.

== Career ==
Rafael was a member of the Brazil under-20 national team. He joined 1860 Munich from Ypiranga ahead of the 2002–03 season, having previously played for Brazilian lower-league clubs. He made five appearances in the Bundesliga. 1860 Munich did not take up the option to extend his contract.

After a year at 1. FC Nürnberg, where he made two 2. Bundesliga appearances, he returned to Brazil with Paulista.
