= Dirk Heinen =

German footballer (born 1970)

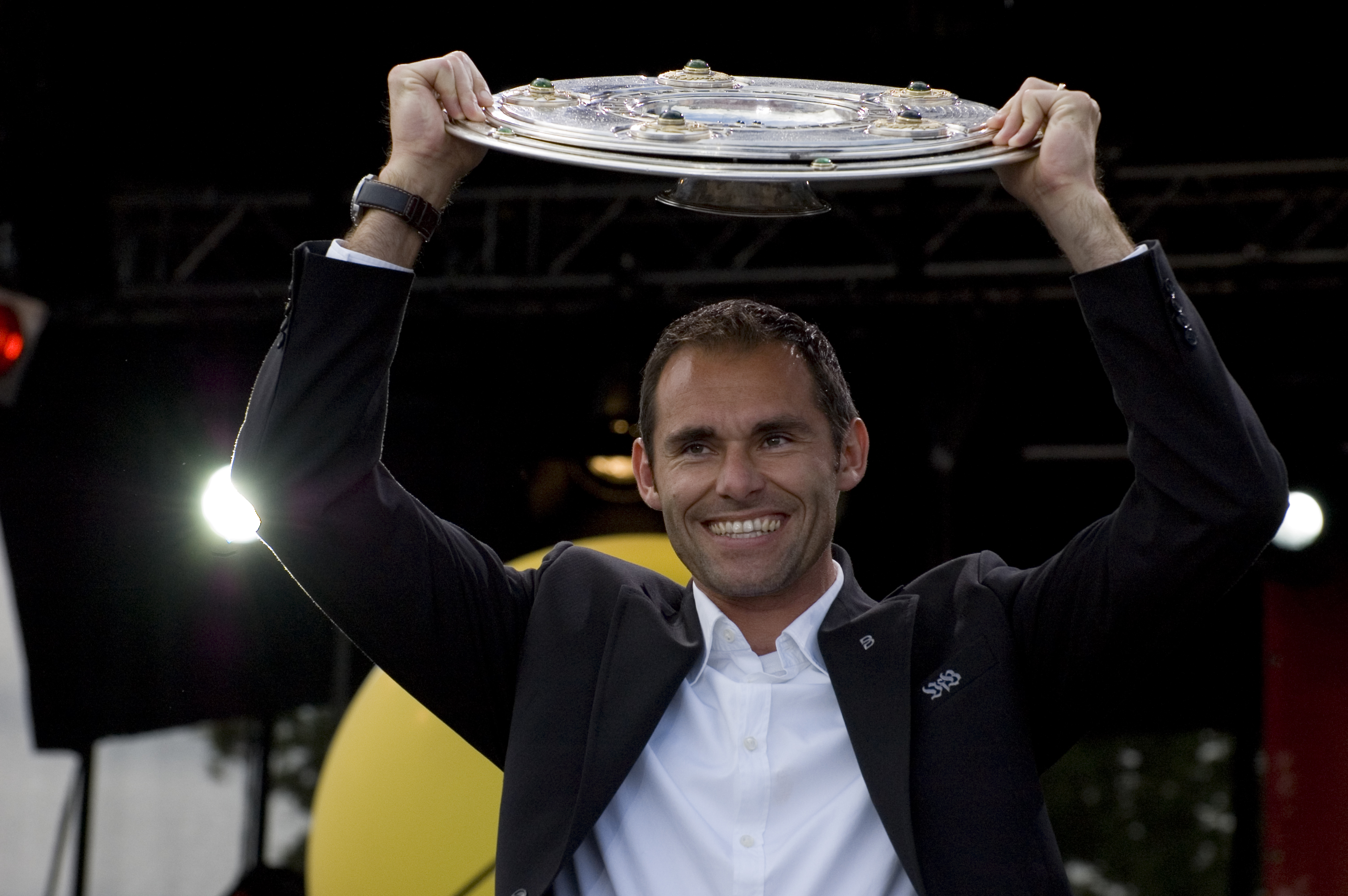
- Heinen celebrating the Bundesliga championship in 2007

Personal information
- Date of birth: 3 December 1970 (age 55)
- Place of birth: Cologne, West Germany
- Height: 1.88 m (6 ft 2 in)
- Position: Goalkeeper

Team information
- Current team: Waterford (Goalkeeper coach)

Youth career
- –1981: Rot-Weiß Köln-Zollstock
- 1981–1990: Bayer Leverkusen

Senior career*
Years	Team	Apps	(Gls)
1990–1999	Bayer Leverkusen	107	(0)
2000–2002	Eintracht Frankfurt	62	(0)
2002–2003	Denizlispor	28	(0)
2003–2007	VfB Stuttgart	3	(0)
2008	Arminia Bielefeld	1	(0)
Total		201	(0)
- * Club domestic league appearances and goals

Dirk Heinen (born 3 December 1970) is a German former professional footballer who played as a goalkeeper. He works as goalkeeping coach of League of Ireland side Waterford.

== Career ==
Heinen played most of his matches in his nine-year stint at Bundesliga side Bayer Leverkusen, before moving to Eintracht Frankfurt. In 2002, he transferred to Süper Lig side Denizlispor, but returned to the Bundesliga after just one season there, this time joining VfB Stuttgart. There, Heinen was the substitute keeper for Timo Hildebrand. He only played three matches there, his last coming in March 2006. After injury he was demoted to third goalkeeper behind Hildebrand and Michael Langer the following season. A German champion with Stuttgart in 2007, he announced his retirement in July 2007, subsequently emigrating to the native country of his wife Sandra, Ireland (County Waterford).

However, in January 2008 the goalkeeper was re-called to German football, moving to Arminia Bielefeld, who asked him to join them as they were short of goalkeepers in early 2008 due to injuries. On 15 March 2008, the 37-year-old made his comeback in the Bundesliga against Hannover 96 after Arminia's second keeper Rowen Fernandez was injured as well.

He retired at the end of the 2007–08 season for good. Since 2008, he is a successful goalkeeper coach in the FAI Regional Center Waterford and in 2017 Heinen was appointed as goalkeeping coach of local League of Ireland club Waterford. He achieved his goalkeeper and trainer license in Germany.

== Career statistics ==
=== Club ===
Appearances and goals by club, season and competition
Club	Season	League			National cup		League cup		Europe		Other		Total	
Club	Season	Division	Apps	Goals	Apps	Goals	Apps	Goals	Apps	Goals	Apps	Goals	Apps	Goals
Bayer Leverkusen	1990–91	Bundesliga	0	0	0	0	—		0	0	—		0	0
Bayer Leverkusen	1991–92	Bundesliga	0	0	0	0	—		—		—		6	0
Bayer Leverkusen	1992–93	Bundesliga	0	0	0	0	—		—		—		0	0
Bayer Leverkusen	1993–94	Bundesliga	2	0	0	0	—		1	0	0	0	3	0
Bayer Leverkusen	1994–95	Bundesliga	4	0	0	0	—		3	0	—		7	0
Bayer Leverkusen	1995–96	Bundesliga	34	0	5	0	—		4	0	—		43	0
Bayer Leverkusen	1996–97	Bundesliga	33	0	1	0	—		—		—		34	0
Bayer Leverkusen	1997–98	Bundesliga	32	0	4	0	1	0	10	0	—		47	0
Bayer Leverkusen	1998–99	Bundesliga	0	0	0	0	0	0	0	0	—		0	0
Bayer Leverkusen	1999–2000	Bundesliga	2	0	1	0	0	0	0	0	—		3	0
Bayer Leverkusen	Total		107	0	11	0	1	0	18	0	0	0	137	0
Eintracht Frankfurt	1999–2000	Bundesliga	17	0	0	0	—		—		—		17	0
Eintracht Frankfurt	2000–01	Bundesliga	30	0	0	0	—		—		—		30	0
Eintracht Frankfurt	2001–02	2. Bundesliga	15	0	3	0	—		—		—		18	0
Eintracht Frankfurt	Total		62	0	3	0	—		—		—		65	0
Denizlispor	2002–03	2. Bundesliga	28	0	8	0	—		—		—		36	0
VfB Stuttgart	2003–04	Bundesliga	0	0	3	0	0	0	0	0	—		3	0
VfB Stuttgart	2004–05	Bundesliga	0	0	0	0	0	0	1	0	—		1	0
VfB Stuttgart	2005–06	Bundesliga	3	0	0	0	0	0	2	0	—		5	0
VfB Stuttgart	Total		3	0	3	0	0	0	3	0	—		9	0
Arminia Bielefeld	2007–08	Bundesliga	1	0	0	0	—		—		—		1	0
Career total			201	0	25	0	1	0	21	0	0	0	248	0

== Honours ==
VfB Stuttgart

- Bundesliga: 2006–07

Bayer Leverkusen

- DFB-Pokal: 1992–93
