= Vlademir =

Brazilian footballer

Personal information
- Full name: Vlademir Jeronimo Barreto
- Date of birth: 1 October 1979 (age 47)
- Place of birth: Santo André, Brazil
- Height: 1.84 m (6 ft 0 in)
- Position: Attacking midfielder

Youth career
- Nacional AC
- CA Juventus
- ADC Mercedes Benz
- União FC

Senior career*
Years	Team	Apps	(Gls)
1998–1999	Independente de Limeira		
1999–2001	AC Linense		
2001–2003	Rio Claro		
2003–2004	1. FC Nürnberg	1	(0)
2004–2006	Akçaabat Sebatspor	3	(1)
2006–2007	Paulista Futebol Clube		
2008	Cardoso Moreira	1	
2009	ADC Valtra		
2010	Grêmio Esportivo Mogiano		
2011	EC Classe A		
- * Club domestic league appearances and goals

Vlademir Jeronimo Barreto (born 1 October 1979), simply known as Vlademir, is a Brazilian former professional footballer who played as an attacking midfielder.

== Career ==
Vlademir was born in Santo André. He played in his professional career for Independente de Limeira (1998 to 1999), CA Linense (1999 to 2001) and Rio Claro (2000 to 2002).

Vlademir moved on trial to SpVgg Unterhaching, here he was not signed and joined in July 2003 to sign a contract with 1. FC Nürnberg and played only two matches with the team, one in the league, his second in DFB Pokal. After just one season he left Germany and on 9 August signed with Akçaabat Sebatspor and played in the 2004–05 season, amassing three games, scoring one goal. On 15 June 2006, he left and signed with Paulista Futebol Clube.

After one and a half years at Paulista he left for Cardoso Moreira on 2 January 2008. Cardoso Moreira then played at 2008 Campeonato Carioca.

After playing tournaments in Mexico and China, he went on to play amateur football.

In October 2008, he left for another amateur club ADC Valtra, a club sponsored by Valtra.

In March 2010, he left for Grêmio Esportivo Mogiano and signed a contract until 30 December 2010.

In 2011 he played in the club Classe A da Barra Funda where he became champion of the Copa Kaiser de Futebol Amador - São Paulo (Série A).

Vlademir continues to play amateur football for veterans and works as a player agent.

== Personal life ==
Vlademir is the older brother of the naturalized German footballer Cacau, who played for VfB Stuttgart in the Bundesliga.
