= Diego Benaglio =

Swiss footballer (born 1983)

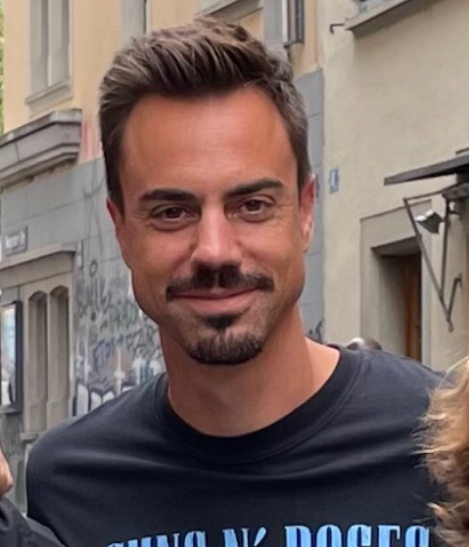
- Benaglio in 2021

Personal information
- Full name: Diego Orlando Benaglio
- Date of birth: 8 September 1983 (age 43)
- Place of birth: Zürich, Switzerland
- Height: 1.94 m (6 ft 4 in)
- Position: Goalkeeper

Youth career
- 1993–1997: Spreitenbach
- 1997–1999: FC Baden
- 1999–2002: Grasshoppers

Senior career*
Years	Team	Apps	(Gls)
2002–2005	VfB Stuttgart	0	(0)
2003–2005	VfB Stuttgart II	54	(0)
2005–2008	Nacional	69	(0)
2008–2017	VfL Wolfsburg	259	(0)
2015	VfL Wolfsburg II	1	(0)
2017–2020	Monaco	26	(0)
Total		409	(0)

International career
2001	Switzerland U19	3	(0)
2002	Switzerland U20	1	(0)
2003–2005	Switzerland U21	15	(0)
2006–2014	Switzerland	61	(0)
2012	Switzerland Olympic	4	(0)
- * Club domestic league appearances and goals

Diego Orlando Benaglio (born 8 September 1983) is a Swiss former professional footballer who played as a goalkeeper.

He spent most of his professional career with Stuttgart and Wolfsburg in Germany's top flight, the Bundesliga, winning the 2009 league championship and appearing in almost 300 competitive matches with the latter club. He also played three years in Portugal earlier in his career, with Nacional.

Benaglio earned 61 caps for Switzerland, representing the nation in three World Cups and Euro 2008.

== Club career ==
=== Early years and Nacional ===
Born in Zürich, Benaglio finished his development at hometown club Grasshopper Club Zürich. Still in his teens he moved to Germany and joined VfB Stuttgart, but appeared exclusively for the reserves during his three-year spell.

Benaglio joined Portugal's C.D. Nacional for the 2005–06 season, soon gaining favour over Henrique Hilário and becoming the Madeirans's undisputed first choice after the veteran left for Chelsea. It was also during his first year that the team qualified for the UEFA Cup.

=== Wolfsburg ===
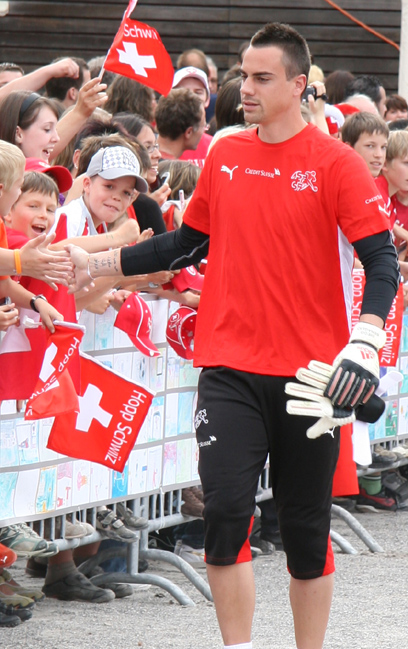
Benaglio in 2008

On 22 January 2008, Benaglio returned to Germany, signing for VfL Wolfsburg. He made his debut eight days later, helping his side advance to the quarter-finals of the German Cup after a penalty shootout win over FC Schalke 04.

Benaglio only missed three matches in the 2008–09 campaign as the Wolves were crowned Bundesliga champions for the first time in their 64-year history. The following year he appeared significantly less, due to injury.

On 23 January 2013, Benaglio signed a contract extension to keep him at the Volkswagen Arena until 2016. When the club won its first domestic cup on 30 May 2015, against Borussia Dortmund, he made late saves from Shinji Kagawa and Pierre-Emerick Aubameyang to ensure the 3–1 victory.

Benaglio played once for VfL Wolfsburg II in the amateur Regionalliga Nord while recovering from injury on 5 September 2015, in a 6–1 home defeat of TSV Havelse.

=== Monaco ===
On 16 June 2017, 33-year-old Benaglio joined AS Monaco FC on a three-year deal. He debuted on 13 September in a 1–1 draw away to RB Leipzig in the group phase of the UEFA Champions League, and made his Ligue 1 bow three days later in a 3–0 home win against RC Strasbourg Alsace.

Benaglio made 39 appearances across all competitions for the team from the principality. He and fellow goalkeepers Danijel Subašić and Seydou Sy were all released in June 2020.

On 18 August 2020, Benaglio announced his retirement from professional football.

== International career ==
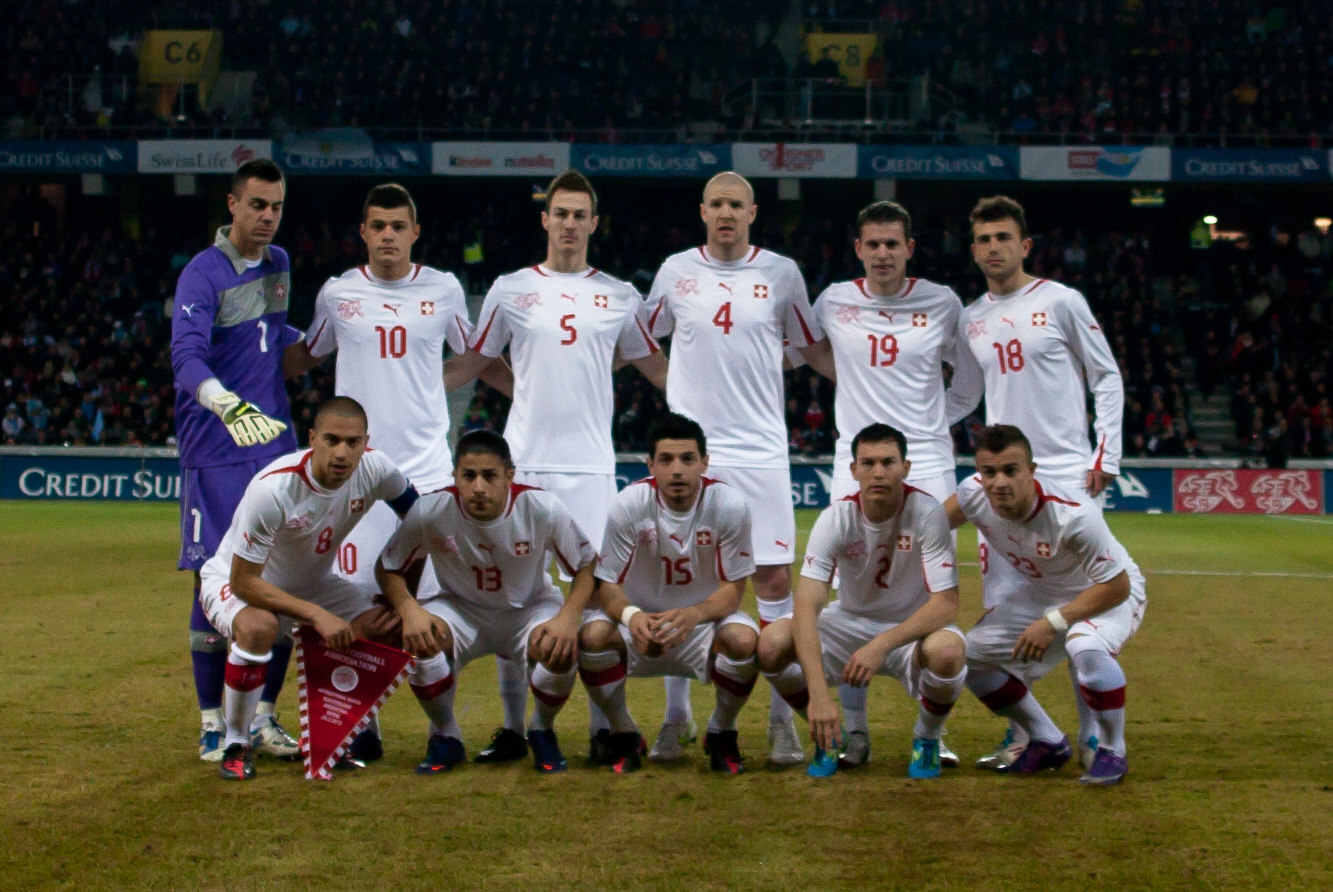
Benaglio (left) with Switzerland in 2012

A Swiss international since 2006, Benaglio was called up for the 2006 FIFA World Cup as third choice behind Pascal Zuberbühler and Fabio Coltorti, making his debut in a pre-tournament friendly against China on 3 June. With consistently good club performances the following years, he was promoted to the starting line-up for UEFA Euro 2008 played on home soil, and became the starter subsequently.

As the national team qualified to the 2010 World Cup in South Africa, Benaglio played all three group stage matches in an eventual group stage exit, conceding only one goal. This included an upset 1–0 victory over Spain, who later won the tournament.

Benaglio captained the Swiss team at the 2012 Olympics, and played nine times during the 2014 World Cup qualification campaign, keeping six clean sheets. On 2 June 2014, he was named in the full side's list for the World Cup finals by national coach Ottmar Hitzfeld, saving a penalty kick from Karim Benzema in the second match but in a 2–5 defeat by France.

On 20 August 2014, Benaglio announced his retirement from international football.

== Career statistics ==
=== Club ===
Appearances and goals by club, season and competition
Club	Season	League			Cup^{1}		League Cup		Europe^{2}		Other^{3}		Total	
Club	Season	Division	Apps	Goals	Apps	Goals	Apps	Goals	Apps	Goals	Apps	Goals	Apps	Goals
VfB Stuttgart	2002–03	Bundesliga	0	0	0	0	—		1^{4}	0	—		1	0
VfB Stuttgart	2003–04	Bundesliga	0	0	0	0	0	0	0	0	—		0	0
VfB Stuttgart	2004–05	Bundesliga	0	0	0	0	0	0	0	0	—		0	0
VfB Stuttgart	Total		0	0	0	0	0	0	1	0	—		1	0
VfB Stuttgart II	2002–03	Oberliga	17	0	—		—		—		—		18	0
VfB Stuttgart II	2003–04	Regionalliga Süd	12	0	—		—		—		—		12	0
VfB Stuttgart II	2004–05	Regionalliga Süd	25	0	—		—		—		—		25	0
VfB Stuttgart II	Total		54	0	—		—		—		—		55	0
Nacional	2005–06	Primeira Liga	23	0	0	0	—		—		—		23	0
Nacional	2006–07	Primeira Liga	30	0	1	0	—		2	0	—		33	0
Nacional	2007–08	Primeira Liga	16	0	0	0	0	0	—		—		16	0
Nacional	Total		69	0	1	0	0	0	2	0	—		72	0
VfL Wolfsburg	2007–08	Bundesliga	17	0	3	0	—		—		—		20	0
VfL Wolfsburg	2008–09	Bundesliga	31	0	4	0	—		7	0	—		42	0
VfL Wolfsburg	2009–10	Bundesliga	22	0	2	0	—		8	0	—		32	0
VfL Wolfsburg	2010–11	Bundesliga	28	0	2	0	—		0	0	—		30	0
VfL Wolfsburg	2011–12	Bundesliga	32	0	1	0	—		—		—		33	0
VfL Wolfsburg	2012–13	Bundesliga	34	0	4	0	—		—		—		38	0
VfL Wolfsburg	2013–14	Bundesliga	29	0	4	0	—		—		—		33	0
VfL Wolfsburg	2014–15	Bundesliga	31	0	5	0	—		12	0	—		48	0
VfL Wolfsburg	2015–16	Bundesliga	21	0	1	0	—		8	0	1	0	31	0
VfL Wolfsburg	2016–17	Bundesliga	14	0	1	0	—		—		—		15	0
VfL Wolfsburg	Total		259	0	27	0	—		35	0	1	0	322	0
Monaco	2017–18	Ligue 1	3	0	2	0	2	0	3	0	—		10	0
Monaco	2018–19	Ligue 1	23	0	0	0	1	0	5	0	—		29	0
Monaco	2019–20	Ligue 1	0	0	0	0	0	0	—		—		0	0
Monaco	Total		26	0	2	0	3	0	8	0	—		39	0
Career total			408	0	29	0	3	0	47	0	1	0	488	0

^{1} Includes DFB Pokal matches.
^{2} Includes Europa League and Champions League matches.
^{3} Includes DFL-Supercup and relegation play-off matches.
^{4} Although still a second-team regular, Benaglio made his first-team debut that season in the UEFA Cup.

=== International ===
Appearances and goals by national team and year
National team	Year	Apps	Goals
Switzerland	2006	4	0
Switzerland	2007	4	0
Switzerland	2008	10	0
Switzerland	2009	7	0
Switzerland	2010	8	0
Switzerland	2011	8	0
Switzerland	2012	7	0
Switzerland	2013	6	0
Switzerland	2014	7	0
Total		61	0

== Honours ==
Wolfsburg

- Bundesliga: 2008–09
- DFB-Pokal: 2014–15
- DFL-Supercup: 2015
