= Christopher Krause =

German footballer

Personal information
- Date of birth: May 24, 1984 (age 42)
- Place of birth: Germany
- Height: 1.80 m (5 ft 11 in)
- Position: Left wing-back

Team information
- Current team: SV Buchonia Flieden
- Number: 20

Youth career
- SG Landenhausen
- Borussia Fulda
- –2003: VfB Stuttgart

Senior career*
Years	Team	Apps	(Gls)
2003–2005	VfB Stuttgart (A)	31	(0)
2005–2006	Bonner SC		
2006–2007	Bayern Munich II	19	(0)
2007–2009	Borussia Fulda	61	(3)
2009–2011	Hünfelder SV	53	(6)
2011–	SV Buchonia Flieden	49	(0)
- * Club domestic league appearances and goals as of 12 December 2012

Christopher Krause (born May 24, 1984) is a German footballer who plays as a defender or midfielder for SV Buchonia Flieden.
