= Steffen Dangelmayr =

German former football defender

Personal information
- Date of birth: 9 September 1978 (age 48)
- Place of birth: Mutlangen, West Germany
- Height: 1.86 m (6 ft 1 in)
- Position: Defender

Youth career
- –1989: Stern Mögglingen
- 1989–1997: VfB Stuttgart

Senior career*
Years	Team	Apps	(Gls)
1997–2008	VfB Stuttgart II	57	(2)
2001–2008	VfB Stuttgart	5	(0)
2008–2009	SGV Freiberg	3	(1)
- * Club domestic league appearances and goals

Steffen Dangelmayr (born 9 September 1978) is a German former football defender. He made five league appearances for the VfB Stuttgart first team during their 2002–03 campaign, which saw them finish runners-up in the Bundesliga table; since that season, however, he did not made a single Bundesliga appearance, instead toiling away in the third division of German football.
