= Imre Szabics =

Hungarian footballer and manager

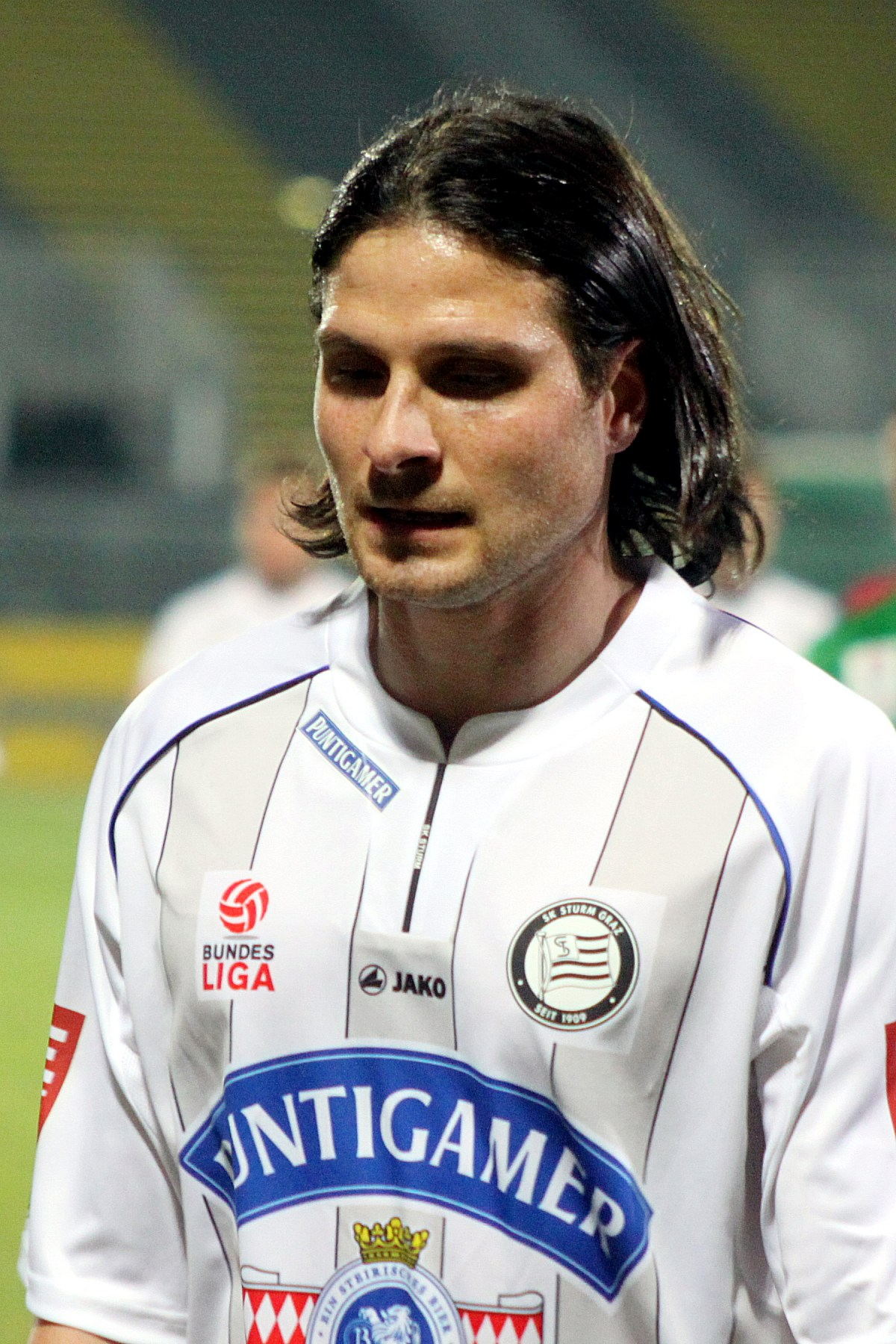
- Szabics playing for Sturm Graz in 2013

Personal information
- Date of birth: 22 March 1981 (age 45)
- Place of birth: Szeged, Hungary
- Height: 1.78 m (5 ft 10 in)
- Position: Striker

Youth career
- 1990–1995: Szeged LC
- 1995–1999: Ferencváros

Senior career*
Years	Team	Apps	(Gls)
1998–1999	Ferencváros	26	(12)
1999–2003	Sturm Graz	89	(23)
2003–2005	VfB Stuttgart	49	(14)
2005–2006	1. FC Köln	11	(1)
2006–2007	Mainz 05	20	(2)
2007–2010	FC Augsburg	54	(8)
2010–2013	Sturm Graz	83	(20)
Total		328	(80)

International career
1996–1997	Hungary U15	2	(0)
1999–2000	Hungary U18	1	(0)
1998–2000	Hungary U21	11	(3)
2003–2013	Hungary	36	(13)

Managerial career
- 2014–2015: Hungary (assistant)
- 2016–2017: Sturm Graz (assistant)
- 2018–2021: Austria (assistant)
- 2021–2022: Fehérvár
- 2024–2025: FC Augsburg (assistant)
- 2025–2026: Al Ahly (assistant)
- 2026: KRC Genk (assistant)
- 2026–: MTK
- * Club domestic league appearances and goals

Imre Szabics (born 22 March 1981) is a Hungarian football manager and former professional footballer. He is currently working as a manager with Nemzeti Bajnokság I club MTK Budapest FC.

Szabics was born in Szeged where he played as a youngster. He was spotted by Ferencváros and signed for them in 1990, making his professional debut in 1998. He spent only one season at the club before moving to Austrian club Sturm Graz. Good form led to an international call-up in 2003, after which he signed for German side VfB Stuttgart. He had a disappointing season in 2004–05 in which he was mostly only used as a substitute, before joining 1. FC Köln in 2005.

After initially being a first-team striker, Szabics had little later success at this club and left when his contract expired in 2006. He was signed by Mainz 05, but was once again unsuccessful. In the summer of 2007, Szabics joined newly promoted 2. Bundesliga side FC Augsburg spending three years with the club. In May 2010, Szabics returned to his former club Sturm Graz.

In 2014 Pál Dárdai appointed Szabics as an assistant coach of the Hungary national football team. Dárdai's successor, Bernd Storck, replaced him with Andreas Möller.

== Club career ==
=== Ferencváros ===
Imre Szabics was born in Szeged and started to play football at local club Szeged LC in 1990. He spent five years with the club before leaving it for Ferencvárosi TC in 1995. Szabics immediately became the favourite player of the fans of the club since he scored 12 goals in 24 matches.

=== Sturm Graz ===
In 1999 Szabics was signed by the Austrian SK Sturm Graz. He played for the Austrian club from 1999 to 2003. During this time, he played in the UEFA Champions League 1999–00 season where Sturm qualified for the second group stages. His last season at Sturm was especially successful, as he became the club's top goalscorer by scoring 11 goals in 27 Bundesliga appearances that season. In May 2003 Szabics was sacked from Sturm because of his "non-compliance with work regulations".

=== VfB Stuttgart ===
Szabics subsequently moved to Germany signing with Bundesliga side VfB Stuttgart in the summer of 2003. He spent two seasons with the club, appearing in a total of 49 Bundesliga matches and scoring 14 goals for VfB Stuttgart in the league. He also played in seven matches in the Champions League season of 2003–04, scoring twice against Manchester United. After a less successful season 2004–05, in which he was mostly only used as a substitute, the striker moved to another Bundesliga side, 1. FC Köln, in the summer of 2005.

=== 1. FC Köln ===
In June 2005 Szabics was signed by the German 1. FC Köln. Szabics had little success at this club, collecting only 11 Bundesliga appearances and scoring one goal in the league before they were relegated to the 2. Bundesliga with a 17th-place finish. He went on to sign a two-year contract with Bundesliga side 1. FSV Mainz 05 in early August 2006. After initially being a first-team striker, he got unlucky again later on, being relegated to the bench in the second half of the season.

=== FC Augsburg ===
After having played in 20 games for Mainz, scoring twice, Imre was transferred to 2. Bundesliga newcomers FC Augsburg in the summer of 2007. There, he played in eight games at the start of the season, scoring twice before he was sidelined by an injury at the end of September.

=== Sturm Graz ===
On 1 May 2010, it was announced that Szabics would return to SK Sturm Graz for the 2010–11 season. Szabics won the Austrian Football Bundesliga in 2011. Szabics's team faced the Hungarian League winner Videoton in the qualifiers of the 2010–11 UEFA Champions League season. It was a special tie for Szabics because he had not played against a Hungarian club since he left his home country. He scored the first goal for his team, which beat Videoton by 2–0 at home. In the away match, Sturm lost to 3–2 but qualified for the next round. In September 2013 Szabics announced his retirement from football.

== International career ==
Szabics made his debut for the Hungarian national team in their friendly match against Luxembourg on 30 April 2003 and went on to score two goals in a 5–1 victory for the Hungarians. He subsequently made four appearances and scored four goals for Hungary in the Euro 2004 qualifying, including a brace in his competitive debut and the team's 3–1 home victory over Latvia on 7 June 2003. He also played for Hungary in five matches of the 2006 World Cup qualifying and scored one goal, the 3–2 winner against Iceland at home in the team's second match of the qualifying. Hungary failed to qualify for any of the two tournaments by finishing fourth in their groups in both of the two qualifying campaigns.

After the injuries of Rudolf, Priskin, and Szalai, Szabics was called up for Hungary again after four years on 3 June 2011. Going in as a substitute for the second half, Szabics scored the only goal of the game in the 53rd minute. On 2 September 2011, Szabics scored against Sweden at the Puskás Ferenc Stadium in the last minutes of the first half; however, Sweden equalized in the second half. A late goal by Szabics's fellow striker Gergely Rudolf resulted the celebration of 25,000 spectators after the team beat Sweden in the Euro 2012 qualifying by 2–1.

== Managerial career ==
On 18 September 2014, Pál Dárdai was appointed as interim manager of the Hungary national team, and he appointed Szabics as an assistant coach. In an interview with the ORF, Szabics stated that it was a big honour to be the assistant coach of the Hungary national team. In an interview with Nemzeti Sport, he said that he was not important in this story, but the national team was. He was replaced by Andreas Möller in October 2015. Assistant manager in Austria national team.

In 2026 he was the assistant coach of KRC Genk besides football manager Jess Thorup.

On 16 November 2026, he was appointed as the manager of MTK Budapest FC.

== Career statistics ==
Scores and results list Hungary's goal tally first, score column indicates score after each Szabics goal.

List of international goals scored by Imre Szabics
No.	Date	Venue	Opponent	Score	Result	Competition
1	30 April 2003	Budapest	Luxembourg	2–1	5–1	Friendly
2	30 April 2003	Budapest	Luxembourg	5–1	5–1	Friendly
3	7 June 2003	Budapest	Latvia	1–1	3–1	UEFA Euro 2004 qualification
4	7 June 2003	Budapest	Latvia	2–1	3–1	UEFA Euro 2004 qualification
5	11 June 2003	Serravalle	San Marino	4–0	5–0	UEFA Euro 2004 qualification
6	11 October 2003	Budapest	Poland	1–1	1–2	UEFA Euro 2004 qualification
7	18 February 2004	Paphos, Cyprus	Armenia	1–0	2–0	Friendly
8	8 September 2004	Budapest	Iceland	3–2	3–2	FIFA World Cup 2006 qualification
9	24 May 2006	Budapest	New Zealand	2–0	2–0	Friendly
10	3 June 2011	Luxembourg	Luxembourg	1–0	1–0	Friendly
11	7 June 2011	Serravalle	San Marino	2–0	3–0	UEFA Euro 2012 qualification
12	2 September 2011	Budapest	Sweden	1–0	2–1	UEFA Euro 2012 qualification
13	6 February 2013	Belek, Turkey	Belarus	1–0	1–1	Friendly

=== Managerial statistics ===
As of 21 November 2026

Team	Nat	From	To	Record				
Team	Nat	From	To	G	W	D	L	Win %
Fehérvár	(Hungary)	1 April 2021	N/A	11	6	2	3	54.55
MTK	(Hungary)	16 November 2026	Present	1	1	0	0	100.00
Total				12	7	2	3	58.33

== Honours ==
Sturm Graz

- Austrian Bundesliga: 2010–11, Runner-up 2000
- Austrian Cup: Runner-up 2002
- Austrian Supercup: Runner-up 2002

VfB Stuttgart

- League Cup: Runner-up 2005

FC Augsburg

- 2. Bundesliga: Third place 2009–10

Individual

- Hungarian Footballer of the Year: 2003
