= Nordderby =

Football match between Hamburger SV and Werder Bremen

- Hamburger SV Werder Bremen
- Other names: North Derby
- Location: Northern Germany
- First meeting: Werder 1–4 HSV (13 March 1927; 99 years ago)
- Latest meeting: Werder 3–1 HSV; Bundesliga (18 April 2026; 4 months ago)
- Stadiums: Volksparkstadion; Weserstadion

Statistics
- Total meetings: 158
- Most wins: Werder Bremen (59)
- All-time series: HSV: 55; Drawn: 44; Werder: 59
- Largest victory: Werder 6–0 HSV (1 May 2004; 22 years ago)

The Nordderby or Northern derby is a match between Hamburger SV and Werder Bremen, the two most successful and popular football clubs in Northern Germany. Hamburger SV (HSV) were created in 1887 and play their matches at the Volksparkstadion, while Werder Bremen were founded in 1899 and have their home ground at the Weserstadion.

Beyond football, there is also a historic rivalry between the cities of Hamburg and Bremen, dating back to medieval times and the Hanseatic League. The two cities are also the core elements of the two largest metropolitan areas in the north of Germany.

== Circumstances regarding the rivalry between the two clubs ==
The match between Werder Bremen and Hamburger SV used to be the most frequently played match in the Bundesliga: Bremen played in the Bundesliga from 1963 to 1980 and from 1981 to 2021, while Hamburg were a Bundesliga club without interruption from 1963 to 2018. The fact that Werder Bremen and HSV are the biggest clubs in Bremen and Hamburg respectively, said cities being the biggest Hanseatic cities and also the biggest in the north of the country contribute to the rivalry. The catchment areas of Hamburger SV and Werder Bremen border on each other and overlaps between the two are not uncommon. In particular, there is an overlap in the districts (Landkreis) of Cuxhaven and Rotenburg (Wümme), which belong to Lower Saxony. Fans of both clubs are neighbours and the majorities differ according to location. A contribution to the rivalry was also made by the death of Adrian Maleika, a Werder Bremen fan, who was hit by a stone by Hamburg hooligans in the run-up to a match between Hamburger SV and the Bremen club in the DFB Cup in 1982, and he succumbed to the stone throwing in a Hamburg hospital. The relationship between Werder Bremen supporters and the Hamburgers was considered "quite normal" until this event.

== History ==
The game was first contested in 1927 with HSV recording a 4–1 away win. Since the founding of the Bundesliga in 1963, the match has been held twice every season, except in 1980–81, because Werder had been relegated to the 2. Bundesliga in the previous season. To date, 158 games have been contested with Werder holding a slight lead of 59 wins to HSV's 55. 44 games have ended in a draw.

The pinnacle of the rivalry came in 2009 when they met four times in 19 days. Two of the four matches came in European competition at the semi-final stage of the last edition of the UEFA Cup. After losing 1–0 at home in the first leg, Werder won 3–2 in Hamburg to advance to the final on away goals. In the 2021–22 season the Nordderby has been played in 2. Bundesliga for the first time, after the relegation of Werder in the 2020–21 season, and the third consecutive failure to promote of HSV, after the relegation in 2017–18. In the 2025–26 season, the derby returned to the Bundesliga after seven years, with HSV's promotion at the end of the previous season.

== All-time results ==
Season	Date	Competition	Home team	Score	Away team	Home goal scorers	Away goal scorers	Att.	Match report
1926–27	13 March 1927	Northern German; Championship	Werder	1–4	HSV	to be added	to be added	7,000	
1935–36	1 September 1935	Tschammer Cup R1	Werder	4–5	HSV	Mahlstedt 5', 35', 70', Ziolkewitz 43'	Noack 15', 41', 87', Gloede 80', Behning 82'	6,600	report
1947–48	9 November 1947	Oberliga Nord	Werder	0–6	HSV	-	Boller 12', 29', 44', Adamkiewicz 28', 38', E. Seeler 84'	15,000	report
1947–48	11 January 1948	Oberliga Nord	HSV	2–2	Werder	Boller 10', 77'	Gernhardt 70', Kraatz 80'	16,000	report
1948–49	3 October 1948	Oberliga Nord	HSV	5–2	Werder	Spundflasche 20', 25', 80', Ebeling 40', Niemann 71'	Rath 70', 85'	15,000	report
1948–49	30 January 1949	Oberliga Nord	Werder	2–3	HSV	Gernhardt 31', 46'	Ackerschott 10' (o.g.), Schmeißer 41', Trenkel 87'	22,500	report
1949–50	8 January 1950	Oberliga Nord	Werder	1–1	HSV	Gernhardt 68'	Adamkiewicz 88'	26,500	report
1949–50	16 April 1950	Oberliga Nord	HSV	3–1	Werder	Rohrberg 29', 55', Wojtkowiak 84'	Hagenacker 7'	16,800	report
1950–51	1 October 1950	Oberliga Nord	HSV	1–1	Werder	Krüger 79'	Klinge 37'	25,500	report
1950–51	8 April 1951	Oberliga Nord	Werder	1–5	HSV	Preuße 82'	Wojtkowiak 7', 22', 70', Adamkiewicz 25', 89'	28,000	report
1951–52	7 October 1951	Oberliga Nord	HSV	4–1	Werder	Harden 6', 46', Krüger 34', 86'	Rath 5'	20,500	report
1951–52	6 January 1952	Oberliga Nord	Werder	2–4	HSV	Gernhardt 44', Sahm 55'	Wojtkowiak 24', 89', Schemel 40', Harden 61'	18,000	report
1952–53	30 December 1952	Oberliga Nord	Werder	4–3	HSV	Burdenski 4', Preuße 39', Behring 73', Klinge 89'	Schemel 14', Klepacz 19', Krüger 57'	18,000	report
1952–53	12 April 1953	Oberliga Nord	HSV	1–4	Werder	Meinke 30'	Hardtke 17', Stange 41', 66', E. Ebert 85'	20,500	report
1953–54	6 December 1953	Oberliga Nord	Werder	2–1	HSV	E. Ebert 69', Behring 77'	Harden 61'	15,000	report
1953–54	14 March 1954	Oberliga Nord	HSV	0–2	Werder	-	Haase 15', Preuße 20'	7,000	report
1954–55	26 December 1954	Oberliga Nord	HSV	2–3	Werder	Schlegel 16', 75'	Posipal 31' (o.g.), Kratz 35', Preuße 52'	10,000	report
1954–55	13 March 1955	Oberliga Nord	Werder	3–1	HSV	Schröder 30', Stange 57', Kratz 70'	Stürmer 17'	35,000	report
1955–56	26 December 1955	Oberliga Nord	Werder	1–1	HSV	Schütz 24'	Harden 55'	15,000	report
1955–56	8 April 1956	Oberliga Nord	HSV	3–1	Werder	U. Seeler 37', 50', 60'	Schröder 55'	22,000	report
1956–57	2 December 1956	Oberliga Nord	HSV	0–3	Werder	-	H. Ebert 1', 35', Čajkovski 37'	12,000	report
1956–57	5 May 1957	Oberliga Nord	Werder	3–1	HSV	Wilmovius 21', Schröder 84', Preuße 88'	Krug 60'	12,000	report
1957–58	17 November 1957	Oberliga Nord	Werder	2–0	HSV	Schröder 57', Wilmovius 75'	-	17,000	report
1957–58	9 February 1958	Oberliga Nord	HSV	3–1	Werder	Schemel 37', Krug 44', U. Seeler 56'	Wilmovius 53'	18,000	report
1958–59	14 September 1958	Oberliga Nord	HSV	3–3	Werder	Reuter 36', U. Seeler 41', 47'	Barth 43', Hänel 50', 90'	20,000	report
1958–59	19 April 1959	Oberliga Nord	Werder	3–2	HSV	Schröder 37', 83', Schimeczek 64'	Reuter 61', Dehn 86'	27,000	report
1958–59	5 August 1959	NFV Cup SF	HSV	9–1	Werder	U. Seeler 6', 46', 57', Neisner 10', 22', 35', 78', Dehn 13', D. Seeler 52'	Hänel 40'	15,000	
1959–60	15 November 1959	Oberliga Nord	Werder	3–3	HSV	Schimeczek 7', Hänel 40', Wilmovius 62'	Neisner 30', 57', U. Seeler 80'	28,000	report
1959–60	3 April 1960	Oberliga Nord	HSV	5–2	Werder	Stürmer 2', C. Dörfel 13', Neisner 57', U. Seeler 62', 66'	Zebrowski 40', Schröder 50'	22,000	report
1959–60	6 August 1960	NFV Cup F	Werder	2–4	HSV	Schimeczek 69', Zebrowski 90'	Krug 67', Stürmer 68', 84', Neisner 87'	15,000	
1960–61	26 December 1960	Oberliga Nord	HSV	4–1	Werder	U. Seeler 1', Dehn 34', Stürmer 52', 88'	Piontek 75'	18,000	report
1960–61	3 April 1961	Oberliga Nord	Werder	2–1	HSV	Wilmovius 22', Barth 51'	Neisner 40'	30,000	report
1961–62	26 November 1961	Oberliga Nord	Werder	2–1	HSV	Schröder 35', Hänel 73'	Dehn 77'	32,000	report
1961–62	18 March 1962	Oberliga Nord	HSV	1–2	Werder	Piechowiak 10'	Barth 55', Schröder 78'	21,000	report
1962–63	14 October 1962	Oberliga Nord	HSV	1–1	Werder	Reuter 29'	Meyer 65'	47,000	report
1962–63	10 February 1963	Oberliga Nord	Werder	1–4	HSV	Thun 45'	U. Seeler 12', 79', C. Dörfel 30', Fritzsche 44'	31,812	report
1963–64	12 October 1963	Bundesliga	Werder	4–2	HSV	Zebrowski 10', Schütz 14', 49', 79'	C. Dörfel 25', U. Seeler 55'	40,000	report
1963–64	26 March 1964	Bundesliga	HSV	1–1	Werder	U. Seeler 2'	Jung 13'	25,000	report
1964–65	26 September 1964	Bundesliga	Werder	0–0	HSV	-	-	40,000	report
1964–65	13 February 1965	Bundesliga	HSV	0–4	Werder	-	Matischak 16', 26', D. Seeler 78' (o.g.), Schütz 80'	50,000	report
1965–66	11 December 1965	Bundesliga	Werder	2–0	HSV	Danielsen 14', Höttges 17'	-	18,000	report
1965–66	21 May 1966	Bundesliga	HSV	1–3	Werder	Pohlschmidt 32'	Soya 24', Piechowiak 33' (o.g.), Schulz 52'	20,000	report
1966–67	24 September 1966	Bundesliga	Werder	5–1	HSV	Höttges 7', Zebrowski 8', Schütz 42', Schweighöfer 52', Danielsen 63'	Kurbjuhn 55'	18,000	report
1966–67	25 February 1967	Bundesliga	HSV	1–1	Werder	U. Seeler 29'	Hänel 18'	22,000	report
1967–68	19 August 1967	Bundesliga	Werder	1–4	HSV	Rupp 10'	Schulz 43', B. Dörfel 65', Kurbjuhn 79', C. Dörfel 88'	40,000	report
1967–68	6 January 1968	Bundesliga	HSV	2–1	Werder	Hönig 35', 52'	Rupp 66'	14,174	report
1968–69	4 September 1968	Bundesliga	HSV	5–2	Werder	C. Dörfel 36', Pötzschke 42', U. Seeler 55', 74', Hönig 90'	Görts 25', Schütz 49'	18,000	report
1968–69	1 February 1969	Bundesliga	Werder	1–1	HSV	Görts 14'	Schulz 69'	30,000	report
1969–70	6 September 1969	Bundesliga	Werder	1–1	HSV	Windhausen 22'	U. Seeler 38'	35,000	report
1969–70	14 April 1970	Bundesliga	HSV	2–2	Werder	Hellfritz 49', Hönig 89'	Schütz 82', Höttges 88'	10,000	report
1970–71	10 October 1970	Bundesliga	HSV	1–1	Werder	Hönig 64'	Windhausen 86'	13,000	report
1970–71	17 April 1971	Bundesliga	Werder	2–2	HSV	Schmidt 28', Lorenz 87'	Hönig 63', Klier 88'	25,000	report
1971–72	27 November 1971	Bundesliga	HSV	2–1	Werder	Volkert 61', Zaczyk 71'	Weist 86'	18,000	report
1971–72	14 February 1972	DFB Cup R2	Werder	4–2	HSV	Kamp 35', Neuberger 40', Hasebrink 61', Höttges 86'	Zaczyk 19', 39'	15,000	report
1971–72	22 February 1972	DFB Cup R2	HSV	1–0	Werder	U. Seeler 77'	-	14,000	report
1971–72	24 June 1972	Bundesliga	Werder	4–0	HSV	Höttges 16', 44', Neuberger 47', Weist 52'	-	8,000	report
1972–73	18 November 1972	Bundesliga	HSV	2–2	Werder	Volkert 3', 43'	Kaltz 68' (o.g.), Laumen 70'	14,000	report
1972–73	5 May 1973	Bundesliga	Werder	1–4	HSV	Görts 28'	Heese 5', 8', Memering 13', Nogly 85'	16,000	report
1973–74	25 August 1973	Bundesliga	Werder	1–1	HSV	Weist 73'	Nogly 88'	26,000	report
1973–74	26 January 1974	Bundesliga	HSV	3–0	Werder	Zaczyk 15', Hönig 61', Volkert 71'	-	23,000	report
1974–75	21 December 1974	Bundesliga	Werder	1–0	HSV	Weist 76'	-	36,000	report
1974–75	7 June 1975	Bundesliga	HSV	2–0	Werder	Bjørnmose 33' Reimann 37'	-	24,000	report
1975–76	22 November 1975	Bundesliga	Werder	1–3	HSV	Görts 78'	Reimann 35', Bertl 39', Memering 67'	37,000	report
1975–76	29 May 1976	Bundesliga	HSV	1–2	Werder	Memering 43'	Görts 22', Aslund 40'	24,000	report
1976–77	21 August 1976	Bundesliga	Werder	2–2	HSV	Röber 40', Konschal 60'	Steffenhagen 30', 56'	37,000	report
1976–77	22 January 1977	Bundesliga	HSV	5–3	Werder	Memering 19', Volkert 67', 72', Steffenhagen 70', Reimann 88'	Görts 45', Bracht 82', Meininger 89'	18,000	report
1977–78	24 September 1977	Bundesliga	Werder	1–2	HSV	Meininger 71'	Keller 32', Keegan 48'	36,000	report
1977–78	18 February 1978	Bundesliga	HSV	1–1	Werder	Bertl 14'	Glowacz 28'	19,000	report
1978–79	19 August 1978	Bundesliga	Werder	1–1	HSV	Wunder 5'	Reimann 66'	28,000	report
1978–79	14 March 1979	Bundesliga	HSV	2–2	Werder	Kaltz 13', Hartwig 46'	Möhlmann 83', Reinders 90'	40,000	report
1979–80	20 October 1979	Bundesliga	Werder	1–1	HSV	Röber 72'	Hrubesch 88'	40,000	report
1979–80	22 March 1980	Bundesliga	HSV	5–0	Werder	Hrubesch 16', 82', 86', Milewski 42', Jakobs 60'	-	31,000	report
1981–82	28 November 1981	Bundesliga	Werder	3–2	HSV	Reinders 6', 8', Kostedde 68'	Bastrup 25', Magath 87'	40,000	report
1981–82	15 May 1982	Bundesliga	HSV	5–0	Werder	Hrubesch 40', 51', 67', Magath 48', Bastrup 73'	-	53,400	report
1982–83	25 August 1982	Bundesliga	HSV	1–1	Werder	Jakobs 22'	Völler 5'	25,000	report
1982–83	16 October 1982	DFB Cup R2	HSV	3–2	Werder	Hrubesch 22', Bastrup 49', 52'	Schaaf 15', Otten 85'	20,000	report
1982–83	29 January 1983	Bundesliga	Werder	3–2	HSV	Völler 43', Neubarth 45', Möhlmann 65'	Bastrup 49', Jakobs 87'	40,000	report
1983–84	23 September 1983	Bundesliga	Werder	0–0	HSV	-	-	40,800	report
1983–84	17 March 1984	Bundesliga	HSV	4–0	Werder	Wuttke 9', Rolff 14', Hartwig 54', Magath 90'	-	46,000	report
1984–85	20 October 1984	Bundesliga	Werder	5–2	HSV	Reinders 43', Völler 54', 81' Neubarth 64', Meier 64'	von Heesen 42', Kaltz 87'	35,000	report
1984–85	3 April 1985	Bundesliga	HSV	2–0	Werder	Magath 32', von Heesen 53'	-	50,000	report
1985–86	31 August 1985	Bundesliga	Werder	2–0	HSV	Neubarth 13', Wolter 79'	-	35,000	report
1985–86	1 February 1986	Bundesliga	HSV	0–1	Werder	-	Burgsmüller 56'	44,000	report
1986–87	16 August 1986	Bundesliga	HSV	3–0	Werder	Gründel 5', 28', Kaltz 71'	-	46,000	report
1986–87	28 February 1987	Bundesliga	Werder	2–1	HSV	Völler 13', 46'	Kastl 70'	32,000	report
1987–88	14 November 1987	Bundesliga	HSV	0–0	Werder	-	-	34,600	report
1987–88	14 May 1988	Bundesliga	Werder	1–4	HSV	Meier 37'	Möhlmann 39', Bein 70', Labbadia 77', 87'	38,000	report
1988–89	23 July 1988	Bundesliga	Werder	2–1	HSV	Riedle 73', Burgsmüller 86'	Spörl 14'	24,594	report
1988–89	18 February 1989	Bundesliga	HSV	2–0	Werder	Bein 47', von Heesen 62'	-	21,000	report
1988–89	29 March 1989	DFB Cup QF	HSV	0–1	Werder	-	Riedle 37'	30,000	report
1989–90	20 September 1989	Bundesliga	HSV	4–0	Werder	Eck 37', Ballwanz 40', von Heesen 67', J. Bode 85'	-	14,000	report
1989–90	31 March 1990	Bundesliga	Werder	2–1	HSV	Bockenfeld 34', Eilts 43'	Furtok 11'	21,679	report
1990–91	1 September 1990	Bundesliga	Werder	3–1	HSV	Allofs 13', Hermann 50', Rufer 83'	Eck 45'	20,441	report
1990–91	15 March 1991	Bundesliga	HSV	3–2	Werder	Beiersdorfer 8', Furtok 25', Stratos 89'	Bratseth 80', Rufer 90'	43,000	report
1991–92	17 August 1991	DFB Cup R2	Werder	3–1	HSV	Rufer 3', Kohn 28', 30'	Furtok 7'	19,400	report
1991–92	10 November 1991	Bundesliga	HSV	0–1	Werder	-	Hermann 22'	20,600	report
1991–92	28 April 1992	Bundesliga	Werder	1–1	HSV	Kohn 21'	Eck 58'	20,000	report
1992–93	4 December 1992	Bundesliga	HSV	0–0	Werder	-	-	46,000	report
1992–93	29 May 1993	Bundesliga	Werder	5–0	HSV	Herzog 32', 90', Rufer 37', 87', Kohn 70'	-	38,395	report
1993–94	24 October 1993	Bundesliga	Werder	0–2	HSV	-	Bäron 32', 44'	36,669	report
1993–94	27 October 1993	DFB Cup R4	Werder	4–2	HSV	Herzog 13', Hobsch 74', Neubarth 86', Rufer 90'	von Heesen 49', Ivanauskas 64'	34,400	report
1993–94	9 April 1994	Bundesliga	HSV	1–1	Werder	Bäron 41'	Herzog 6'	36,950	report
1994–95	6 October 1994	Bundesliga	Werder	1–4	HSV	Beschastnykh 12'	Letchkov 29', Houbchev 38', Wiedener 45' (o.g.), Zárate 80'	38,878	report
1994–95	2 April 1995	Bundesliga	HSV	0–0	Werder	-	-	42,000	report
1995–96	18 August 1995	Bundesliga	HSV	3–3	Werder	Breitenreiter 14', 25', Spörl 51'	Hobsch 31', 79', Basler 61'	32,247	report
1995–96	5 March 1996	Bundesliga	Werder	2–1	HSV	Scholz 3', Cardoso 33'	Spörl 33'	29,000	report
1996–97	2 November 1996	Bundesliga	Werder	0–0	HSV	-	-	35,400	report
1996–97	3 April 1997	Bundesliga	HSV	3–2	Werder	Cardoso 6', Spörl 18', Mason 62'	Kovačević 77' (o.g.), M. Bode 90'	31,392	report
1997–98	17 October 1997	Bundesliga	Werder	0–0	HSV	-	-	34,800	report
1997–98	27 March 1998	Bundesliga	HSV	2–1	Werder	Dembiński 78', Yeboah 90'	M. Bode 25'	38,261	report
1998–99	23 October 1998	Bundesliga	HSV	1–1	Werder	Yeboah 58'	Maksymov 86'	29,052	report
1998–99	13 April 1999	Bundesliga	Werder	0–0	HSV	-	-	34,486	report
1999–00	21 November 1999	Bundesliga	Werder	2–1	HSV	M. Bode 62', Aílton 81'	Butt 90'	35,838	report
1999–00	15 April 2000	Bundesliga	HSV	0–0	Werder	-	-	52,800	report
2000–01	6 September 2000	Bundesliga	HSV	2–1	Werder	Barbarez 25', Hertzsch 82'	M. Bode 42'	37,400	report
2000–01	3 February 2001	Bundesliga	Werder	3–1	HSV	Pizarro 45', 90', Aílton 71'	Heinz 57'	31,500	report
2001–02	22 September 2001	Bundesliga	HSV	0–4	Werder	-	Aílton 13', M. Bode 34', Ernst 84', Stalteri 86'	43,000	report
2001–02	24 February 2002	Bundesliga	Werder	0–1	HSV	-	Romeo 74'	32,300	report
2002–03	18 August 2002	Bundesliga	Werder	2–1	HSV	Charisteas 9', Wehlage 50'	Ujfaluši 20'	35,000	report
2002–03	2 February 2003	Bundesliga	HSV	1–0	Werder	Barbarez 56'	-	45,000	report
2003–04	29 November 2003	Bundesliga	HSV	1–1	Werder	Rahn 50'	Ernst 27'	55,500	report
2003–04	1 May 2004	Bundesliga	Werder	6–0	HSV	Barbarez 16' (o.g.), Ismaël 22', Klasnić 39', Aílton 48', Valdez 80', Skrypnyk 84'	-	42,500	report
2004–05	30 October 2004	Bundesliga	Werder	1–1	HSV	Schulz 74'	Jarolím 22'	42,100	report
2004–05	9 April 2005	Bundesliga	HSV	1–2	Werder	Mahdavikia 58'	Klose 8', Klasnić 70'	55,500	report
2005–06	18 December 2005	Bundesliga	Werder	1–1	HSV	Micoud 45'	Kučuković 67'	42,100	report
2005–06	13 May 2006	Bundesliga	HSV	1–2	Werder	Barbarez 59'	Klasnić 27', Klose 72'	57,000	report
2006–07	1 August 2006	League Cup SF	Werder	2–1	HSV	Zidan 50', Frings 82'	Sanogo 70'	27,650	report
2006–07	23 September 2006	Bundesliga	HSV	1–1	Werder	Reinhardt 69'	Borowski 58'	57,000	report
2006–07	17 February 2007	Bundesliga	Werder	0–2	HSV	-	van der Vaart 42', 87'	42,100	report
2007–08	1 December 2007	Bundesliga	Werder	2–1	HSV	Sanogo 15', Pasanen 64'	van der Vaart 60'	42,100	report
2007–08	23 May 2008	Bundesliga	HSV	0–1	Werder	-	Almeida 50'	57,000	report
2008–09	23 November 2008	Bundesliga	HSV	2–1	Werder	Guerrero 6', Olić 74'	Diego 24'	56,121	report
2008–09	22 April 2009	DFB Cup SF	HSV	1–1 1–3 p	Werder	Olić 67'	Mertesacker 11'	55,237	report
2008–09	30 April 2009	UEFA Cup SF	Werder	0–1	HSV	-	Trochowski 28'	37,500	report
2008–09	7 May 2009	UEFA Cup SF	HSV	2–3	Werder	Olić 13', 87'	Diego 29', Pizarro 66', Baumann 83'	51,000	report
2008–09	10 May 2009	Bundesliga	Werder	2–0	HSV	Almeida 34', 49'	-	42,100	report
2009–10	20 December 2009	Bundesliga	HSV	2–1	Werder	Mathijsen 9', Jansen 36'	Naldo 90'	57,000	report
2009–10	8 May 2010	Bundesliga	Werder	1–1	HSV	Pizarro 58'	van Nistelrooy 82'	41,150	report
2010–11	25 September 2010	Bundesliga	Werder	3–2	HSV	Marin 25', Almeida 29', 86'	van Nistelrooy 59', Pitroipa 65'	36,300	report
2010–11	19 February 2011	Bundesliga	HSV	4–0	Werder	Petrić 42', Guerrero 64', 79', Ben-Hatira 89'	-	54,100	report
2011–12	10 September 2011	Bundesliga	Werder	2–0	HSV	Pizarro 52', 78'	-	41,600	report
2011–12	18 February 2012	Bundesliga	HSV	1–3	Werder	Petrić 76'	Marin 9', Trybull 45', Arnautović 86'	56,000	report
2012–13	1 September 2012	Bundesliga	Werder	2–0	HSV	Hunt 52', Petersen 67'	-	42,100	report
2012–13	27 January 2013	Bundesliga	HSV	3–2	Werder	Son 23', Aogo 46', Rudņevs 52'	Lukimya 9', Papastathopoulos 54'	56,000	report
2013–14	21 September 2013	Bundesliga	HSV	0–2	Werder	-	Petersen 32', 90'	53,300	report
2013–14	1 March 2014	Bundesliga	Werder	1–0	HSV	Junuzović 19'	-	42,100	report
2014–15	23 November 2014	Bundesliga	HSV	2–0	Werder	Rudņevs 83', Wolf 90' (o.g.)	-	53,300	report
2014–15	19 April 2015	Bundesliga	Werder	1–0	HSV	Di Santo 84'	-	42,100	report
2015–16	28 November 2015	Bundesliga	Werder	1–3	HSV	Ujah 62'	Iličević 3', Gregoritsch 27', N. Müller 68'	42,100	report
2015–16	22 April 2016	Bundesliga	HSV	2–1	Werder	Lasogga 5', 32'	Ujah 65'	57,000	report
2016–17	26 November 2016	Bundesliga	HSV	2–2	Werder	Gregoritsch 3', 28'	Bartels 14', Gnabry 45'	55,200	report
2016–17	16 April 2017	Bundesliga	Werder	2–1	HSV	Kruse 41', Kainz 75'	Gregoritsch 6'	42,100	report
2017–18	30 September 2017	Bundesliga	HSV	0–0	Werder	-	-	54,631	report
2017–18	24 February 2018	Bundesliga	Werder	1–0	HSV	van Drongelen 86' (o.g.)	-	42,100	report
2021–22	18 September 2021	2. Bundesliga	Werder	0–2	HSV	-	Glatzel 2', Heyer 45+1'	21,050	report
2021–22	27 February 2022	2. Bundesliga	HSV	2–3	Werder	Meffert 46', Glatzel 80'	Ducksch 10', 78', Füllkrug 51'	25,000	report
2025–26	7 December 2025	Bundesliga	HSV	3–2	Werder	Sambi Lokonga 63', Vušković 75', Poulsen 84'	Stage 45', Njinmah 78'	56,100	report
2025–26	18 April 2026	Bundesliga	Werder	3–1	HSV	Stage 37', 57', Puertas 90+1'	Glatzel 41'	40,000	report

== Head to head ==
Overall match statistics.

Competition	Games	HSV wins	Draws	Werder wins
Bundesliga	110	35	35	40
Oberliga Nord	32	12	7	13
2. Bundesliga	2	1	0	1
Cup	11	6	2*	3
League Cup	1	0	0	1
UEFA Cup	2	1	0	1
Total	158	55	44	59

* Cup game finished 1–1 after 120 minutes, won by Werder Bremen on penalties.

== Honours ==
Competition	Werder Bremen	Hamburger SV
German champions/ Bundesliga	4	6
DFB-Pokal	6	3
DFL-Supercup	3	0
DFL-Ligapokal	1	2
UEFA Champions League	0	1
UEFA Cup Winners' Cup	1	1
2. Bundesliga	1	0
Total	16	13

== Head-to-head ranking in Bundesliga (1964–2026) ==
P.	64	65	66	67	68	69	70	71	72	73	74	75	76	77	78	79	80	81	82	83	84	85	86	87	88	89	90	91	92	93	94	95	96	97	98	99	00	01	02	03	04	05	06	07	08	09	10	11	12	13	14	15	16	17	18	19	20	21	22	23	24	25	26
1		1														1			1	1					1					1											1																						
2					2								2				2	2		2	2	2	2	2								2											2		2																		
3																										3		3									3					3	3	3			3																
4			4									4														4														4					4																		
5								5											5		5	5		5				5					5													5																	
6						6	6							6											6														6	6																							
7	7																						7				7								7	7		7						7			7			7													
8																															8			8							8	8						8						8		8						8	
9			9			9																							9				9		9		9												9												9		
10	10						10		10						10																															10						10	10										
11		11						11	11	11	11			11		11											11			11									11																11								
12											12																		12		12																				12												
13					13								13																			13		13		13		13										13					13							13			13
14				14						14																																								14				14									
15												15			15																																		15														15
16				16																																															16	16					16						
17																	17																																						17			17					
18																																																															
2. Bundesliga / Second tier
1																		1																																													
2																																																											2			2	
3																																																											3	3			
4																																																								4	4	4			4		
