= List of Hamburger SV players =

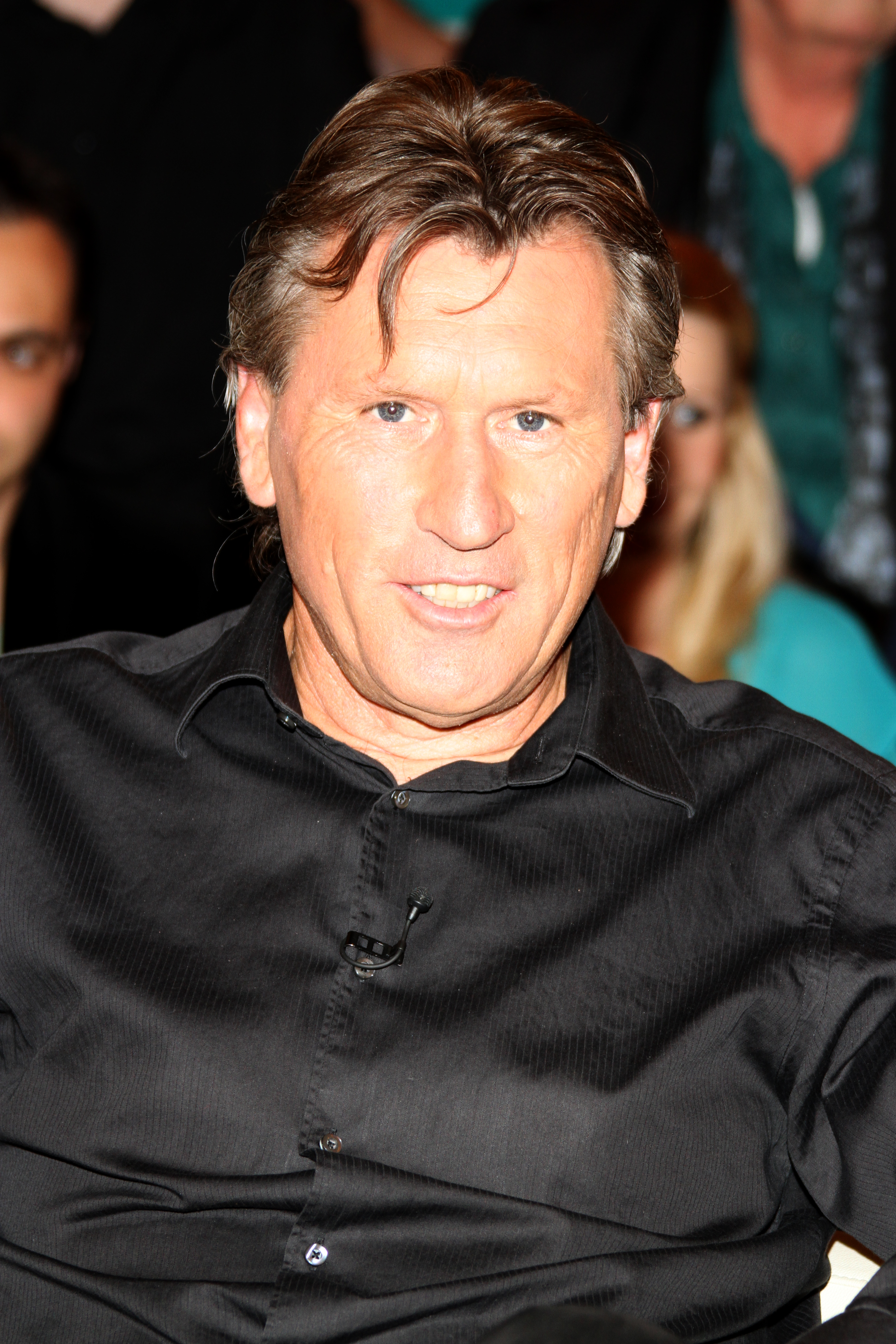
Manfred Kaltz made a record 741 first team appearances for Hamburger SV.

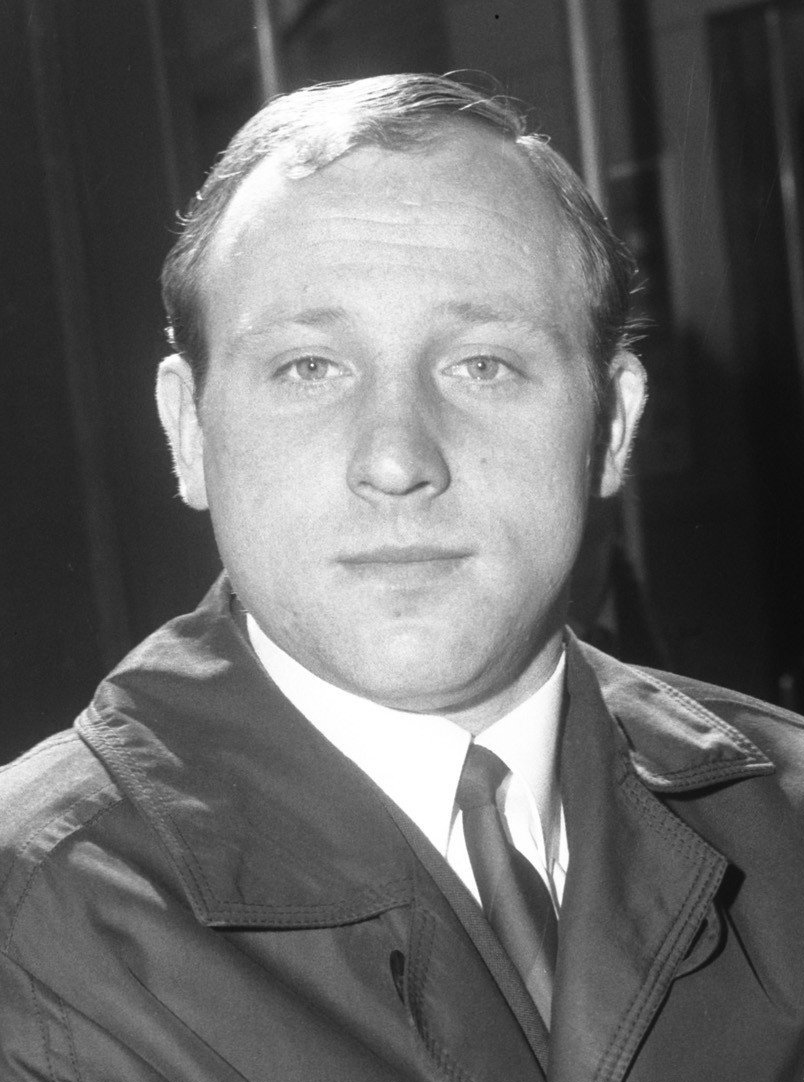
Uwe Seeler is the club's record goalscorer with 496 goals.

Hamburger SV is a German football club based in Hamburg. The team plays in the Bundesliga – the highest tier in the German football league system. The club was founded in 1919, from a merger of three earlier clubs, whose origins date to 1887.

The following is a list of the players with the most first team appearances and goals for the club.

== Players ==
As of 23 July 2026

Bold signifies current Hamburger SV players.

List of Hamburger SV players with 50 or more appearances
Player	Nationality	Position	HSV career	Appearances	Goals
Friedo Dörfel	Germany	DF	1933–1948	52	15
Erwin Reinhardt	Germany	DF	1934–1949	50	0
Walter Warning	Germany	GK	1935–1939; 1940–1951	98	0
Heinz Spundflasche	Germany	MF	1937–1952	149	39
Edmund Adamkiewicz	Germany	FW	1939–1943; 1945–1946; 1947–1951	116	79
Erich Ebeling	Germany	FW	1944–1946; 1947–1948; 1948–1952	107	43
Rolf Rohrberg	Germany	FW	1944–1945; 1949–1952	64	37
Heinz Trenkel	Germany	DF	1947–1950	67	14
Manfred Krüger	Germany	FW	1948–1954	152	36
Günter Schlegel	Germany	FW	1948–1949; 1953–1958	145	84
Herbert Wojtkowiak	Germany	FW	1948–1956	222	156
Jochen Meinke	Germany	DF	1949–1966	380	9
Otto Globisch	Germany	GK	1949–1953	71	0
Werner Harden	Germany	FW	1949–1958	151	89
Herbert Klette	Germany	DF	1949–1952	65	2
Josef Posipal	Germany	DF	1949–1958	301	17
Rolf Börner	Germany	FW	1950–1958	165	17
Fritz Laband	Germany	DF	1950–1956	150	0
Karl-Heinz Liese	Germany	MF	1950–1958	219	23
Dieter Seeler	Germany	FW	1950–1952; 1955–1966	288	51
Walter Schemel	Germany	FW	1950–1960	184	45
Franz Klepacz	Germany	DF	1951–1961	250	30
Ralph Pendorf	Germany	FW	1951–1955	63	9
Horst Schnoor	Germany	GK	1952–1969	494	2
Uwe Seeler	Germany	FW	1953–1972	581	496
Klaus Stürmer	Germany	FW	1954–1961	212	135
Jürgen Werner	Germany	MF	1954–1963	220	15
Gerhard Krug	Germany	DF	1955–1966	302	52
Uwe Reuter	Germany	FW	1955–1960; 1961–1964	155	57
Klaus Neisner	Germany	FW	1957–1963	109	37
Erwin Piechowiak	Germany	MF	1957–1966	164	6
Peter Wulf	Germany	MF	1957–1967	169	79
Horst Dehn	Germany	MF	1958–1966	177	35
Gert Dörfel	Germany	FW	1959–1972	419	140
Harry Bähre	Germany	MF	1960–1972	124	8
Jürgen Kurbjuhn	Germany	DF	1960–1972	399	15
Hubert Stapelfeld	Germany	DF	1960–1965	53	0
Bernd Dörfel	Germany	FW	1963–1968	102	22
Willi Giesemann	Germany	MF	1963–1968	124	15
Holger Dieckmann	Germany	MF	1964–1969	121	5
Egon Horst	Germany	DF	1965–1969	151	0
Manfred Pohlschmidt	Germany	FW	1965–1967	64	24
Helmut Sandmann	Germany	DF	1965–1973	246	4
Willi Schulz	Germany	DF	1965–1973	256	3
Hans-Jürgen Hellfritz	Germany	DF	1966–1972	126	7
Hans Schulz	Germany	MF	1966–1971	142	27
Özcan Arkoç	Turkey	GK	1967–1974	207	0
Franz-Josef Hönig	Germany	MF	1967–1974	259	81
Werner Krämer	Germany	MF	1967–1969	67	14
Robert Pötzschke	Germany	FW	1968–1971	56	4
Peter Nogly	Germany	DF	1969–1980	411	51
Klaus Zaczyk	Germany	MF	1969–1980	340	67
Hans-Jürgen Ripp	Germany	DF	1970–1979	235	2
Ole Björnmose	Germany	MF	1971–1977	246	46
Manfred Kaltz	Germany	DF	1971–1989; 1990–1991	741	101
Rudi Kargus	Germany	GK	1971–1980	333	0
Caspar Memering	Germany	MF	1971–1982	399	49
Georg Volkert	Germany	FW	1971–1978	280	81
Klaus Winkler	Germany	DF	1971–1977	155	20
Kurt Eigl	Germany	MF	1972–1978	105	18
Horst Heese	Germany	FW	1972–1974	54	15
Peter Hidien	Germany	DF	1972–1982	287	17
Peter Krobbach	Germany	DF	1973–1975	85	9
Horst Bertl	Germany	MF	1974–1979	151	35
Willi Reimann	Germany	FW	1974–1981	240	72
Hans-Jürgen Sperlich	Germany	FW	1974–1977	105	12
Horst Blankenburg	Germany	DF	1975–1977	67	0
Ferdinand Keller	Germany	FW	1976–1978	58	35
Felix Magath	Germany	MF	1976–1986	388	63
Arno Steffenhagen	Germany	FW	1976–1978	76	17
Ivan Buljan	Croatia	DF	1977–1981	124	27
Kevin Keegan	England	FW	1977–1980	113	40
Jimmy Hartwig	Germany	MF	1978–1984	239	72
Horst Hrubesch	Germany	FW	1978–1983	212	134
Bernd Wehmeyer	Germany	DF	1978–1986	236	14
Holger Hieronymus	Germany	DF	1979–1984	169	11
Ditmar Jakobs	Germany	DF	1979–1989	405	37
Jürgen Milewski	Germany	FW	1979–1985	175	59
Jürgen Groh	Germany	DF	1980–1985	207	5
Heinz-Josef Koitka	Germany	GK	1980–1982; 1987–1990	61	0
Michael Schröder	Germany	DF	1980–1986; 1989–1992	145	23
Uli Stein	Germany	GK	1980–1987; 1994–1995	296	0
Thomas von Heesen	Germany	MF	1980–1994	443	125
Lars Bastrup	Denmark	FW	1981–1983	89	28
Wolfgang Rolff	Germany	MF	1982–1986	156	29
Wolfram Wuttke	Germany	MF	1983–1986	71	17
Gerard Plessers	Belgium	DF	1984–1988	93	6
Heinz Gründel	Germany	FW	1985–1988	72	17
Tobias Homp	Germany	DF	1985–1989; 1995–1997	91	4
Thomas Kroth	Germany	MF	1985–1988	89	7
Peter Lux	Germany	MF	1985–1987	62	7
Dietmar Beiersdorfer	Germany	DF	1986–1992	211	16
Sascha Jusufi	Germany	MF	1986–1991	134	14
Miroslaw Okonski	Poland	FW	1986–1988	78	19
Uwe Bein	Germany	MF	1987–1989	62	23
Richard Golz	Germany	GK	1987–1998	314	0
Carsten Kober	Germany	DF	1987–1996	259	2
Bruno Labbadia	Germany	FW	1987–1989	50	16
Harald Spörl	Germany	MF	1987–2000	377	71
Jan Furtok	Poland	FW	1988–1993	156	58
John Jensen	Denmark	MF	1988–1990	57	2
Hans-Werner Moser	Germany	DF	1988–1990	55	2
Jörg Bode	Germany	MF	1989–1994	92	4
Detlev Dammeier	Germany	MF	1989–1992	62	2
Armin Eck	Germany	MF	1989–1994	149	22
Thomas Doll	Germany	MF	1990–1991; 1998–2001	83	7
Waldemar Matysik	Poland	MF	1990–1993	105	1
Nando	Brazil	FW	1990–1992	75	18
Frank Rohde	Germany	DF	1990–1993	116	9
Jürgen Hartmann	Germany	MF	1991–1997	214	10
Stefan Schnoor	Germany	DF	1991–1998	149	8
Markus Babbel	Germany	DF	1992–1994	63	1
Karsten Bäron	Germany	FW	1992–2001	138	48
Yordan Lechkov	Bulgaria	MF	1992–1996	108	15
Jörg Albertz	Germany	MF	1993–1996; 2001–2003	138	29
Valdas Ivanauskas	Lithuania	FW	1993–1997	106	19
Marijan Kovacevic	Croatia	DF	1993–1997	63	2
Stig Tøfting	Denmark	MF	1993–1995; 2000–2002	74	3
André Breitenreiter	Germany	FW	1994–1998	89	21
Andreas Fischer	Germany	MF	1994–2001	178	9
Petar Hubchev	Bulgaria	DF	1994–1997	69	2
Stéphane Henchoz	Switzerland	DF	1995–1997	59	2
Sven Kmetsch	Germany	MF	1995–1998	97	4
Hasan Salihamidžić	Bosnia and Herzegovina	MF	1995–1998	88	21
Rodolfo Cardoso	Argentina	MF	1996–2004	137	19
Bernd Hollerbach	Germany	DF	1996–2004	224	7
Markus Schopp	Austria	MF	1996–1998	58	7
Hans-Jörg Butt	Germany	GK	1997–2001	161	21
Jacek Dembiński	Poland	FW	1997–2001	75	14
Thomas Gravesen	Denmark	MF	1997–2000	83	6
Ingo Hertzsch	Germany	DF	1997–2003	177	1
Andrej Panadić	Croatia	DF	1997–2002	121	7
Anthony Yeboah	Ghana	FW	1997–2002	121	35
Fabian Ernst	Germany	MF	1998–2000	54	0
Martin Groth	Germany	MF	1998–2003	96	14
Nico-Jan Hoogma	Netherlands	DF	1998–2004	207	17
Niko Kovač	Croatia	MF	1999–2001	73	13
Mehdi Mahdavikia	Iran	FW	1999–2007	263	34
Roy Präger	Germany	FW	1999–2002	103	20
Sergej Barbarez	Bosnia and Herzegovina	FW	2000–2006	216	76
Milan Fukal	Czech Republic	DF	2000–2004	68	8
Marek Heinz	Czech Republic	FW	2000–2003	65	6
Erik Meijer	Netherlands	FW	2000–2003	61	12
Tomas Ujfalusi	Czech Republic	DF	2000–2004	116	2
Marcel Maltritz	Germany	DF	2001–2004	74	5
Martin Pieckenhagen	Germany	GK	2001–2005	114	0
Stefan Wächter	Germany	GK	2001–2007	91	0
Collin Benjamin	Namibia	MF	2002–2011	191	14
Christian Rahn	Germany	DF	2002–2005	58	10
Bernardo Romeo	Argentina	FW	2002–2005	88	45
Raphael Wicky	Switzerland	MF	2002–2007	164	6
Stefan Beinlich	Germany	MF	2003–2006	92	7
David Jarolim	Czech Republic	MF	2003–2012	344	19
Bastian Reinhardt	Germany	DF	2003–2010	180	9
Björn Schlicke	Germany	DF	2003–2005	53	2
Naohiro Takahara	Japan	FW	2003–2006	119	16
Khalid Boulahrouz	Netherlands	DF	2004–2006	66	1
René Klingbeil	Germany	DF	2004–2007	67	0
Benjamin Lauth	Germany	FW	2004–2007	73	16
Emile Mpenza	Belgium	FW	2004–2006	52	9
Daniel Van Buyten	Belgium	DF	2004–2006	84	10
Thimothée Atouba	Cameroon	DF	2005–2009	118	2
Guy Demel	Ivory Coast	DF	2005–2011	200	5
Piotr Trochowski	Germany	MF	2005–2011	259	36
Rafael van der Vaart	Netherlands	MF	2005–2008; 2012–2015	199	66
Nigel de Jong	Netherlands	MF	2006–2009	94	5
Vincent Kompany	Belgium	DF	2006–2008	51	4
Paolo Guerrero	Peru	FW	2006–2012	183	51
Joris Mathijsen	Netherlands	DF	2006–2011	211	8
Jérôme Boateng	Germany	DF	2007–2010	113	2
Ivica Olić	Croatia	FW	2007–2009; 2015–2016	143	51
Frank Rost	Germany	GK	2007–2011	203	0
Dennis Aogo	Germany	DF	2008–2014	168	3
Marcell Jansen	Germany	DF	2008–2015	187	24
Mladen Petrić	Croatia	FW	2008–2012	136	61
Jonathan Pitroipa	Burkina Faso	FW	2008–2011	105	6
Tolgay Arslan	Turkey	MF	2009–2015	92	2
Maximilian Beister	Germany	FW	2009–2015	51	10
Marcus Berg	Sweden	FW	2009–2013	70	13
Eljero Elia	Netherlands	FW	2009–2011	65	8
Tomás Rincón	Venezuela	MF	2009–2014	128	0
Robert Tesche	Germany	MF	2009–2014	83	6
Zé Roberto	Brazil	MF	2009–2011	72	8
Dennis Diekmeier	Germany	DF	2010–2018	184	0
Jaroslav Drobný	Czech Republic	GK	2010–2016	84	0
Gojko Kačar	Serbia	MF	2010–2016	83	7
Heung-min Son	South Korea	FW	2010–2013	78	20
Heiko Westermann	Germany	DF	2010–2015	173	11
Ivo Iličević	Croatia	FW	2011–2016	92	12
Michael Mancienne	Seychelles	DF	2011–2014	55	0
René Adler	Germany	GK	2012–2017	129	0
Milan Badelj	Croatia	MF	2012–2014	69	2
Petr Jiracek	Czech Republic	MF	2012–2015	58	2
Artjoms Rudnevs	Latvia	FW	2012–2016	77	17
Johan Djourou	Switzerland	DF	2013–2017	104	2
Pierre-Michel Lasogga	Germany	FW	2013–2019	138	49
Lewis Holtby	Germany	MF	2014–2019	138	15
Gideon Jung	Germany	DF	2014–2021	143	3
Nicolai Müller	Germany	MF	2014–2018	88	17
Matthias Ostrzolek	Germany	MF	2014–2017	89	1
Albin Ekdal	Sweden	MF	2015–2018	57	1
Michael Gregoritsch	Austria	FW	2015–2017	58	11
Aaron Hunt	Germany	MF	2015–2021	153	26
Gotoku Sakai	Japan	DF	2015–2019	124	1
**Bakery Jatta**	Gambia	FW	2016–	233	31
Filip Kostić	Serbia	MF	2016–2019	65	9
Douglas Santos	Brazil	DF	2016–2019	88	3
Bobby Wood	United States	FW	2016–2019	80	13
Kyriakos Papadopoulos	Greece	DF	2017–2020	51	3
Julian Pollersbeck	Germany	GK	2017–2020	51	0
Rick van Drongelen	Netherlands	DF	2017–2021	95	2
Jonas David	Germany	DF	2018–2024	59	2
Khaled Narey	Togo	FW	2018–2021	85	11
Josha Vagnoman	Germany	DF	2018–2022	73	5
Manuel Wintzheimer	Germany	FW	2018–2022	73	8
Jeremy Dudziak	Tunisia	MF	2019–2021	58	5
**Daniel Heuer Fernandes**	Portugal	GK	2019–	190	0
Jan Gyamerah	Ghana	DF	2019–2022	56	1
David Kinsombi	Germany	DF	2019–2022	84	11
Sonny Kittel	Germany	MF	2019–2023	140	36
Tim Leibold	Germany	DF	2019–2023	83	5
Moritz Heyer	Germany	DF	2020–2025	126	13
Robert Glatzel	Germany	FW	2021–2026	150	84
Jonas Meffert	Germany	MF	2021–2026	146	4
**Miro Muheim**	Switzerland	DF	2021–	159	10
Ludovit Reis	Netherlands	MF	2021–2025	129	20
Sebastian Schonlau	Germany	DF	2021–2025	115	6
Anssi Suhonen	Finland	MF	2021–2026	52	2
László Bénes	Slovakia	MF	2022–2024	64	21
Jean-Luc Dompé	France	FW	2022–2026	113	18
Ransford Königsdörffer	Ghana	FW	2022–2026	138	33
William Mikelbrencis	France	DF	2022–2026	68	0
Dennis Hadzikadunic	Bosnia and Herzegovina	DF	2023–2025	52	2
**Immanuel Pherai**	Suriname	MF	2023–	57	6
**Daniel Elfadli**	Libya	DF	2024–	55	3

== Club captains ==
Name	Period	Ref.
(Germany) Richard Dörfel	1945–1948	
(Germany) Erwin Reinhardt	1948–1949	
(Germany) Jupp Posipal	1954–1958	
(Germany) Jochen Meinke	1958–1963	
(Germany) Uwe Seeler	1963–1972	
(Germany) Franz-Josef Hönig	1972–1974	
(Germany) Georg Volkert	1974–1976	
(Germany) Peter Nogly	1976–1979	
(Germany) Felix Magath	1979–1981	
(Germany) Horst Hrubesch	1981–1983	
(Germany) Felix Magath	1983–1986	
(Germany) Thomas von Heesen	1986–1988	
(Germany) Manfred Kaltz	1988–1989	
(Germany) Ditmar Jakobs	1989	
(Germany) Thomas von Heesen	1989–1990	
(Germany) Dietmar Beiersdorfer	1990–1992	
(Germany) Frank Rohde	1992–1993	
(Germany) Thomas von Heesen	1993–1994	
(Germany) Jürgen Hartmann	1994–1995	
(Germany) Jörg Albertz	1995–1996	
(Germany) Richard Golz	1996–1997	
(Germany) Sven Kmetsch	1997–1998	
(Germany) Andreas Fischer	1998–1999	
(Germany) Martin Groth	1999–2001	
(Netherlands) Nico-Jan Hoogma	2001–2004	
(Belgium) Daniel Van Buyten	2004–2006	
(Netherlands) Rafael van der Vaart	2006–2008	
(Czech Republic) David Jarolím	2008–2010	
(Germany) Heiko Westermann	2010–2013	
(Netherlands) Rafael van der Vaart	2013–2015	
(Switzerland) Johan Djourou	2015–2017	
(Japan) Gotoku Sakai	2017–2018	
(Germany) Aaron Hunt	2018–2020	
(Germany) Tim Leibold	2020–2021	
(Germany) Sebastian Schonlau	2021–2025	
(Denmark) Yussuf Poulsen	2025–2026	
(Germany) Nicolai Remberg	2026–	
