= List of Hamburger SV seasons =

This is a list of seasons played by Hamburger SV in German and European football.

== Oberliga Nord (1947–63) ==
Season	League							German Championship	DFB-Pokal	Europe		Top Scorer(s)	
Season	Div.	Pld	W	D	L	Pts	Position	German Championship	DFB-Pokal	Competition	Round	Top Scorer(s)	
1947–48	OLN	22	17	3	2	37	1	QF	NH	NH		(Germany) Alfred Boller	18
1948–49	OLN	22	15	2	5	32	1	QF	NH	NH		(Germany) Erich Ebeling	11
1949–50	OLN	30	21	6	3	48	1	R2	NH	NH		(Germany) Edmund Adamkiewicz	22
1950–51	OLN	32	22	5	5	49	1	GS	NH	NH		(Germany) Herbert Wojtkowiak	40
1951–52	OLN	30	19	7	4	45	1	GS	NH	NH		(Germany) Werner Harden (Germany) Herbert Wojtkowiak	26
1952–53	OLN	30	18	7	5	43	1	GS	QF	NH		(Germany) Werner Harden (Germany) Herbert Wojtkowiak	16
1953–54	OLN	30	12	8	10	28^{[A]}	11	–	SF	NH		(Germany) Herbert Wojtkowiak	16
1954–55	OLN	30	23	1	6	47	1	GS	R2	NH		(Germany) Günter Schlegel (Germany) Uwe Seeler	28
1955–56	OLN	30	17	7	6	41	1	GS	RU	–		(Germany) Uwe Seeler	32
1956–57	OLN	30	16	9	5	41	1	RU	SF	–		(Germany) Uwe Seeler	31
1957–58	OLN	30	20	3	7	43	1	RU	–	–		(Germany) Uwe Seeler	22
1958–59	OLN	30	25	2	3	52	1	GS	SF	–		(Germany) Uwe Seeler	29
1959–60	OLN	30	20	5	5	45	1	W	SF	–		(Germany) Uwe Seeler	36
1960–61	OLN	30	24	2	4	50	1	GS	–	European Cup	SF	(Germany) Uwe Seeler	29
1961–62	OLN	30	24	2	4	50	1	GS	–	–		(Germany) Uwe Seeler	28
1962–63	OLN	30	22	5	3	49	1	GS	W	–		(Germany) Uwe Seeler	32

== Bundesliga and 2. Bundesliga (1963–) ==
Season	League							DFB-Pokal	Europe		Top Scorer(s)		Average Attendance
Season	Div.	Pld	W	D	L	Pts	Position	DFB-Pokal	Competition	Round	Top Scorer(s)		Average Attendance
1963–64	BL	30	11	10	9	32	6	R1	Cup Winners' Cup	QF	(Germany) Uwe Seeler	30	34,600
1964–65	BL	30	11	5	14	27	11	R4	–		(Germany) Uwe Seeler	14	34,933
1965–66	BL	34	13	8	13	34	9	QF	–		(Germany) Manfred Pohlschmidt	18	26,882
1966–67	BL	34	10	10	14	30	14	RU	–		(Germany) Uwe Seeler	10	25,265
1967–68	BL	34	11	11	12	33	13	R1	Cup Winners' Cup	RU	(Germany) Uwe Seeler	12	19,265
1968–69	BL	34	13	10	11	36	6	QF	Inter-Cities Fairs Cup	QF	(Germany) Uwe Seeler	23	21,059
1969–70	BL	34	12	11	11	35	6	R4	–		(Germany) Uwe Seeler	17	17,765
1970–71	BL	34	13	11	10	37	5	QF	Inter-Cities Fairs Cup	R2	(Germany) Franz-Josef Hönig	13	17,235
1971–72	BL	34	13	7	14	33	10	R4	UEFA Cup	R2	(Germany) Uwe Seeler	11	17,000
1972–73	BL	34	10	8	16	28	14	R4	–		(Germany) Franz-Josef Hönig	11	18,118
1973–74	BL	34	13	5	16	31	12	RU	–		(Germany) Georg Volkert	8	24,735
1974–75	BL	34	18	7	9	43	4	R2	UEFA Cup	QF	(Germany) Horst Bertl (Germany) Willi Reimann	8	31,941
1975–76	BL	34	17	7	10	41	2	W	UEFA Cup	SF	(Germany) Peter Nogly	9	32,059
1976–77	BL	34	14	10	10	38	6	R2	Cup Winners' Cup	W	(Germany) Willi Reimann	15	34,647
1977–78	BL	34	14	6	14	34	10	R4	Cup Winners' Cup	R2	(Germany) Ferdinand Keller	14	31,235
1978–79	BL	34	21	7	6	49	1	R1	–		(England) Kevin Keegan	17	42,441
1979–80	BL	34	20	8	6	48	2	R3	European Cup	RU	(Germany) Horst Hrubesch	21	37,785
1980–81	BL	34	21	7	6	49	2	QF	UEFA Cup	R3	(Germany) Horst Hrubesch	17	32,832
1981–82	BL	34	18	12	4	48	1	SF	UEFA Cup	RU	(Germany) Horst Hrubesch	27	34,700
1982–83	BL	34	20	12	2	52	1	R4	European Cup	W	(Germany) Horst Hrubesch	18	28,583
1983–84	BL	34	21	6	7	48	2	R4	European Cup	R2	(Germany) Dieter Schatzschneider	15	28,463
1984–85	BL	34	14	9	11	37	5	R1	UEFA Cup	R3	(Germany) Thomas von Heesen	15	22,013
1985–86	BL	34	17	5	12	39	7	R1	UEFA Cup	R1	(Germany) Heinz Gründel	11	18,435
1986–87	BL	34	19	9	6	47	2	W	–		(Germany) Thomas von Heesen	12	24,234
1987–88	BL	34	13	11	10	37	6	SF	Cup Winners' Cup	R2	(Germany) Bruno Labbadia	11	16,009
1988–89	BL	34	17	9	8	43	4	QF	–		(Germany) Uwe Bein	15	17,615
1989–90	BL	34	13	5	16	31	11	R1	UEFA Cup	QF	(Poland) Jan Furtok	10	21,341
1990–91	BL	34	16	8	10	40	5	R4	–		(Poland) Jan Furtok	20	23,994
1991–92	BL	38	9	16	13	34	12	R2	UEFA Cup	R3	(Germany) Armin Eck	9	22,604
1992–93	BL	34	8	15	11	31	11	R2	–		(Germany) Karsten Bäron	8	23,774
1993–94	BL	34	13	8	13	34	12	R4	–		(Germany) Thomas von Heesen	14	31,347
1994–95	BL	34	10	9	15	29	13	R1	–		(Germany) Jörg Albertz	9	30,445
1995–96	BL	34	12	14	8	50	5	R1	–		(Germany) Harald Spörl	14	27,959
1996–97	BL	34	10	11	13	41	13	SF	UEFA Cup	R3	(Germany) Harald Spörl	8	29,746
1997–98	BL	34	11	11	12	44	9	R2	Intertoto Cup	SF	(Bosnia and Herzegovina) Hasan Salihamidžić	10	33,105
1998–99	BL	34	13	11	10	50	7	R4	–		(Ghana) Tony Yeboah	14	24,361
1999–2000	BL	34	16	11	7	59	3	R3	Intertoto Cup	RU	(Germany) Hans-Jörg Butt (Germany) Roy Präger (Ghana) Tony Yeboah	9	41,934
2000–01	BL	34	10	11	13	41	13	R2	Champions League	GS	(Bosnia and Herzegovina) Sergej Barbarez	22	42,995
2000–01	BL	34	10	11	13	41	13	R2	UEFA Cup	R3	(Bosnia and Herzegovina) Sergej Barbarez	22	42,995
2001–02	BL	34	10	10	14	40	11	R2	–		(Argentina) Bernardo Romeo	8	44,445
2002–03	BL	34	15	11	8	56	4	R4	–		(Argentina) Bernardo Romeo	14	45,625
2003–04	BL	34	14	7	13	49	8	R4	UEFA Cup	R1	(Argentina) Bernardo Romeo	11	48,074
2004–05	BL	34	16	3	15	51	8	R1	Intertoto Cup	SF	(Bosnia and Herzegovina) Sergej Barbarez	11	48,927
2005–06	BL	34	21	5	8	68	3	R4	Intertoto Cup	W	(Bosnia and Herzegovina) Sergej Barbarez	10	52,630
2005–06	BL	34	21	5	8	68	3	R4	UEFA Cup	R2	(Bosnia and Herzegovina) Sergej Barbarez	10	52,630
2006–07	BL	34	10	15	9	45	7	R1	Champions League	GS	(Netherlands) Rafael van der Vaart	8	56,024
2007–08	BL	34	14	12	8	54	4	QF	Intertoto Cup	W	(Croatia) Ivica Olić	14	55,120
2007–08	BL	34	14	12	8	54	4	QF	UEFA Cup	R2	(Croatia) Ivica Olić	14	55,120
2008–09	BL	34	19	4	11	61	5	SF	UEFA Cup	SF	(Croatia) Mladen Petrić	12	54,774
2009–10	BL	34	13	13	8	52	7	R2	Europa League	SF	(Croatia) Mladen Petrić	8	55,242
2010–11	BL	34	12	9	13	45	8	R2	–		(Croatia) Mladen Petrić	11	54,446
2011–12	BL	34	8	12	14	36	15	R4	–		(Croatia) Mladen Petrić	7	53,435
2012–13	BL	34	14	6	14	48	7	R1	–		(Latvia) Artjoms Rudņevs (South Korea) Son Heung-min	12	52,916
2013–14	BL	34	7	6	21	27	16^{[B]}	QF	–		(Germany) Pierre-Michel Lasogga	13	51,825
2014–15	BL	34	9	8	17	35	16^{[C]}	R2	–		(Germany) Pierre-Michel Lasogga (Netherlands) Rafael van der Vaart	4	53,252
2015–16	BL	34	11	8	15	41	10	R1	–		(Germany) Nicolai Müller	9	53,700
2016–17	BL	34	10	8	16	38	14	QF	–		(Austria) Michael Gregoritsch (Germany) Nicolai Müller (United States) Bobby Wood	5	52,341
2017–18	BL	34	8	7	19	31	17↓	R1	–		(Germany) Lewis Holtby	6	50,657
2018–19	2.BL	34	16	8	10	56	4	SF	–		(Germany) Pierre-Michel Lasogga	13	48,865
2019–20	2.BL	34	14	12	8	54	4	R2	–		(Germany) Sonny Kittel	11	33,400
2020–21	2.BL	34	16	10	8	58	4	R1	–		(Germany) Simon Terodde	24	33,400
2021–22	2.BL	34	16	12	6	60	3^{[D]}	SF	–		(Germany) Robert Glatzel	22	23,695
2022–23	2.BL	34	20	6	8	66	3^{[E]}	R1	–		(Germany) Robert Glatzel	19	53,529
2023–24	2.BL	34	17	7	10	58	4	R3	–		(Germany) Robert Glatzel	22	55,889
2024–25	2.BL	34	16	11	7	59	2↑	R2	–		(Germany) Davie Selke	22	56,324
2025–26	BL	34	9	11	14	38	13	R16	–		(Portugal) Fábio Vieira	7	56,947

== Key ==
Top scorer shown in bold when he was also the league's highest or joint highest scorer.

- Pld = Matches played
- W = Matches won
- D = Matches drawn
- L = Matches lost
- GF = Goals for
- GA = Goals against
- Pts = Points
- Pos = Final position
- BL = Bundesliga
- 2.BL = 2. Bundesliga
- OLN= Oberliga Nord
- RL = Regionalliga
- GL = Gauliga
- NH = Not held
- GS = Group stage
- R1 = Round 1
- R2 = Round 2
- R3 = Round 3
- R4 = Round 4
- QF = Quarter-finals
- SF = Semi-finals
- F = Final

Champions	Runners-up	Promoted	Relegated

== Notes ==
A. Hamburg received a four-point deduction for making illegal payments to Willi Schröder.
B. Defeated Greuther Fürth in the relegation play-off.
C. Defeated Karlsruher SC in the relegation play-off.
D. Lost to Hertha BSC in the promotion play-off.
E. Lost to VfB Stuttgart in the promotion play-off.
