= 1991–92 Hamburger SV season =

Hamburger SV
1991–92 season
- Manager: Gerd-Volker Schock (to 8 March); Egon Coordes (from 14 March)
- Stadium: Volksparkstadion
- Bundesliga: 12th
- DFB-Pokal: Second round
- UEFA Cup: Third round
- Top goalscorer: League: Jan Furtok; Armin Eck (8); All: Jan Furtok (11)

The 1991–92 Hamburger SV season was the 45th season in the club's history and the 29th consecutive season playing in the Bundesliga. Hamburger SV finished twelfth in the league.

The club also participated in the DFB-Pokal and UEFA Cup, where it reached second round and third round respectively.

== Competitions ==
=== Overview ===
Competition	First match	Last match	Starting round	Final position	Record							
Competition	First match	Last match	Starting round	Final position	Pld	W	D	L	GF	GA	GD	Win %
Bundesliga	3 August 1991	16 May 1992	Matchday 1	12th	38	9	16	13	32	43	−11	23.68
DFB-Pokal	17 August 1991	17 August 1991	Second round	Second round	1	0	0	1	1	3	−2	0.00
UEFA Cup	11 September 1991	10 December 1991	First round	Third round	6	3	1	2	12	8	+4	50.00
Total					45	12	17	16	45	54	−9	26.67

Source: Competitions

=== Bundesliga ===
==== League table ====
Pos	Team	Pld	W	D	L	GF	GA	GD	Pts
10	Bayern Munich	38	13	10	15	59	61	−2	36
11	Schalke 04	38	11	12	15	45	45	0	34
12	Hamburger SV	38	9	16	13	32	43	−11	34
13	Borussia Mönchengladbach	38	10	14	14	37	49	−12	34
14	Dynamo Dresden	38	12	10	16	34	50	−16	34

Source: www.dfb.de
Rules for classification: 1) points; 2) goal difference; 3) number of goals scored.
The league contracted back to 18 teams for the 1992–93 season.

==== Matches ====
3 August 1991 1	Schalke 04	0–0	Hamburger SV	Gelsenkirchen
15:30		Report		Stadium: Parkstadion; Attendance: 54,200; Referee: Gerhard Theobald

21 August 1991 4	Hamburger SV	1–1	1. FC Köln	Hamburg
20:00	von Heesen 11'	Report	Ordenewitz 51'	Stadium: Volksparkstadion; Attendance: 26,800; Referee: Hans Fux

7 September 1991 8	1. FC Nürnberg	1–1	Hamburger SV	Nürnberg
15:30	Eckstein 53'	Report	von Heesen 49'	Stadium: Städtisches Stadion; Attendance: 35,000; Referee: Manfred Führer

21 September 1991 10	Borussia Dortmund	2–2	Hamburger SV	Dortmund
15:30	Lusch 6'; Poschner 19'	Report	Furtok 14' (pen.), 73'	Stadium: Westfalenstadion; Attendance: 44,976; Referee: Aron Schmidhuber

28 September 1991 11	Hamburger SV	1–1	VfB Stuttgart	Hamburg
15:30	Spörl 4'	Report	Frontzeck 37'	Stadium: Volksparkstadion; Attendance: 26,000; Referee: Hans-Jürgen Weber

19 October 1991 14	Bayer Leverkusen	1–1	Hamburger SV	Leverkusen
15:30	Buncol 65'	Report	Rohde 81'	Stadium: Ulrich-Haberland-Stadion; Attendance: 13,800; Referee: Günther Habermann

2 November 1991 16	Karlsruher SC	4–1	Hamburger SV	Karlsruhe
15:30	Schütterle 2', 4'; Rolff 85'; Scholl 87'	Report	Eck 58'	Stadium: Wildparkstadion; Attendance: 11,000; Referee: Wieland Ziller

30 November 1991 20	Hamburger SV	2–1	Schalke 04	Hamburg
15:30	Furtok 64', 70'	Report	Christensen 90'	Stadium: Volksparkstadion; Attendance: 23,197; Referee: Hans Scheuerer

8 February 1992 23	1. FC Köln	0–0	Hamburger SV	Cologne
15:30		Report		Stadium: Müngersdorfer Stadion; Attendance: 19,000; Referee: Manfred Neuner

8 March 1992 27	Hamburger SV	0–2	1. FC Nürnberg	Hamburg
19:00		Report	Zietsch 15'; Eckstein 52'	Stadium: Volksparkstadion; Attendance: 15,000; Referee: Georg Dardenne

20 March 1992 29	Hamburger SV	1–1	Borussia Dortmund	Hamburg
20:00	Furtok 33'	Report	Chapuisat 28'	Stadium: Volksparkstadion; Attendance: 31,500; Referee: Hans Fux

28 March 1992 30	VfB Stuttgart	3–2	Hamburger SV	Stuttgart
15:30	Walter 14' (pen.), 58'; Gaudino 81'	Report	Eck 19', 85'	Stadium: Neckarstadion; Attendance: 25,000; Referee: Klaus-Dieter Stenzel

18 April 1992 33	Hamburger SV	1–1	Bayer Leverkusen	Hamburg
15:30	Cyroń 73'	Report	Herrlich 53'	Stadium: Volksparkstadion; Attendance: 27,300; Referee: Karl-Heinz Gläser

2 May 1992 35	Hamburger SV	0–1	Karlsruher SC	Hamburg
15:30		Report	Fritz 12'	Stadium: Volksparkstadion; Attendance: 17,750; Referee: Günther Habermann

=== DFB Pokal ===
17 August 1991 Second round	Werder Bremen	3–1	Hamburger SV	Bremen
20:00	Rufer 3'; Kohn 28', 30'	Report	Furtok 7'	Stadium: Weser-Stadion; Attendance: 19,400; Referee: Werner Föckler

=== UEFA Cup ===
==== First round ====
11 September 1991 First leg	Hamburger SV (Germany)	1–1	(Poland) Górnik Zabrze	Hamburg
	Eckel 80'	Report	Jegor 50'	Stadium: Volksparkstadion

2 October 1991 Second leg	Górnik Zabrze (Poland)	0–3 (1–4 agg.)	(Germany) Hamburger SV	Zabrze
		Report	von Heesen 60', 80'; Spörl 84'	Stadium: Stadion Górnik

==== Second round ====
22 October 1991 First leg	Hamburger SV (Germany)	2–0	(Bulgaria) CSKA Sofia	Hamburg
	Rohde 36', 88'	Report		Stadium: Volksparkstadion

6 November 1991 Second leg	CSKA Sofia (Bulgaria)	1–4 (1–6 agg.)	(Germany) Hamburger SV	Sofia
	Dimitrov 43' (pen.)	Report	Spörl 33', 82'; Furtok 55' (pen.); Bode 85'	Stadium: Stadion Balgarska Armia

==== Third round ====
27 November 1991 First leg	Hamburger SV (Germany)	1–2	(Czechoslovakia) Sigma Olomouc	Hamburg
	Furtok 21'	Report	Hapal 10', 45'	Stadium: Volksparkstadion

10 December 1991 Second leg	Sigma Olomouc (Czechoslovakia)	4–1 (6–2 agg.)	(Germany) Hamburger SV	Olomouc
	Kerbr 13'; Hapal 64'; Látal 70'; Hanus 75'	Report	Spörl 60'	Stadium: Andrův stadion

== Statistics ==
=== Squad statistics ===
No.	Pos	Nat	Player	Total		Bundesliga		DFB-Pokal		UEFA Cup	
No.	Pos	Nat	Player	Apps	Goals	Apps	Goals	Apps	Goals	Apps	Goals
	GK	(Germany) GER	Nils Bahr	8	0	7	0	0	0	1	0
	GK	(Germany) GER	Richard Golz	37	0	30	0	1	0	6	0
	GK	(Germany) GER	Andreas Reinke	1	0	1	0	0	0	0	0
	DF	(Germany) GER	Holger Ballwanz	5	0	4	0	0	0	1	0
	DF	(Germany) GER	Dietmar Beiersdorfer	40	1	34	1	1	0	5	0
	DF	(Germany) GER	Carsten Kober	42	0	35	0	1	0	6	0
	DF	(Germany) GER	Frank Rohde	44	6	37	4	1	0	6	2
	DF	(Germany) GER	Stefan Schnoor	5	0	5	0	0	0	0	0
	DF	(Germany) GER	Thomas Stratos	12	0	10	0	0	0	2	0
	MF	(Germany) GER	Jörg Bode	37	2	31	1	1	0	5	1
	MF	(Germany) GER	Detlev Dammeier	18	0	15	0	1	0	2	0
	MF	(Germany) GER	Armin Eck	43	8	36	8	1	0	6	0
	MF	(Germany) GER	Jürgen Hartmann	43	0	36	0	1	0	6	0
	MF	(Poland) POL	Waldemar Matysik	41	0	35	0	1	0	5	0
	MF	(Germany) GER	Harald Spörl	41	6	34	2	1	0	6	4
	MF	(Germany) GER	Thomas von Heesen	31	4	26	2	1	0	4	2
	MF	(Germany) GER	Jens Bochert	1	0	0	0	0	0	1	0
	FW	(Poland) POL	Ryszard Cyroń	13	1	13	1	0	0	0	0
	FW	(Germany) GER	Uwe Eckel	13	1	10	0	0	0	3	1
	FW	(Brazil) BRA	Émerson	4	1	4	1	0	0	0	0
	FW	(Poland) POL	Jan Furtok	37	11	30	8	1	1	6	2
	FW	(Brazil) BRA	Nando	30	2	24	2	1	0	5	0
	FW	(Germany) GER	Herbert Waas	33	2	33	2	0	0	0	0
