= 1999–2000 Hamburger SV season =

Hamburger SV
1999–2000 season
- Manager: Frank Pagelsdorf
- Stadium: Volksparkstadion
- Bundesliga: 3rd
- DFB-Pokal: Third round
- UEFA Intertoto Cup: Finalists
- Top goalscorer: Hans-Jörg Butt; Roy Präger; Tony Yeboah (9)
- Average home league attendance: 41,934
Home colours	Away colours	Third colours

The 1999–2000 Hamburger SV season was the 112th season in the club's history. During the 1999–2000 season, they competed in the Bundesliga, in which they finished 3rd alongside the DFB-Pokal where they reached the third round and the UEFA Intertoto Cup, where they were finalists, losing to Montpellier on penalties. The season covers the period from 1 July 1999 to 30 June 2000.

== Season summary ==
Hamburg rose to third place in the final table - their highest finish since finishing as runners-up in 1987.

== First team squad ==
Squad at end of season

Note: Flags indicate national team as defined under FIFA eligibility rules; some limited exceptions apply. Players may hold more than one non-FIFA nationality.

No.	Pos.	Nation	Player
1	GK	(Germany) GER	Hans-Jörg Butt
2	MF	(Denmark) DEN	Thomas Gravesen
3	DF	(Croatia) CRO	Andrej Panadić
4	DF	(Germany) GER	Ingo Hertzsch
5	DF	(Netherlands) NED	Nico-Jan Hoogma
6	MF	(Greece) GRE	Dimitrios Grammozis (Note: Grammozis was born in Wuppertal, West Germany, but also qualified to represent Greece internationally through his parents and represented Greece at U-21 level.)
7	MF	(Germany) GER	Martin Groth
8	FW	(Poland) POL	Jacek Dembiński
9	FW	(Federal Republic of Yugoslavia) YUG	Vanja Grubač
10	MF	(Germany) GER	Thomas Doll
11	MF	(Croatia) CRO	Niko Kovač (Note: Kovač was born in Wedding, West Germany, but also qualified to represent Croatia and Bosnia and Herzegovina internationally through his parents and made his international debut for Croatia in December 1996.)
12	GK	(Germany) GER	Alexander Bade
13	MF	(Germany) GER	Andreas Fischer
14	MF	(Germany) GER	Fabian Ernst

No.	Pos.	Nation	Player
15	DF	(Iran) IRN	Mehdi Mahdavikia
16	FW	(Iran) IRN	Vahid Hashemian
17	FW	(Ghana) GHA	Tony Yeboah
18	FW	(Iran) IRN	Rasoul Khatibi
19	FW	(Germany) GER	Soner Uysal
20	MF	(Germany) GER	Bernd Hollerbach
21	MF	(Germany) GER	Harald Spörl
22	FW	(Germany) GER	Roy Präger
24	FW	(Germany) GER	Mahmut Yılmaz
26	MF	(Germany) GER	Özkan Gümüs
27	MF	(Argentina) ARG	Rodolfo Cardoso
28	GK	(North Macedonia) MKD	Saša Ilić
29	FW	(Germany) GER	Karsten Bäron
30	MF	(Germany) GER	Christof Babatz

=== Left club during season ===
Note: Flags indicate national team as defined under FIFA eligibility rules; some limited exceptions apply. Players may hold more than one non-FIFA nationality.

No.	Pos.	Nation	Player
19	DF	(Australia) AUS	Josip Šimunić (Note: Šimunić was born in Canberra, Australia, but also qualified to represent Croatia and Bosnia and Herzegovina internationally through his parents and made his international debut for Croatia in November 2001.) (to Hertha Berlin)

== Competitions ==
=== Bundesliga ===
==== League table ====
Pos	Team	Pld	W	D	L	GF	GA	GD	Pts	Qualification or relegation
1	Bayern Munich (C)	34	22	7	5	73	28	+45	73	Qualification to Champions League group stage
2	Bayer Leverkusen	34	21	10	3	74	36	+38	73	Qualification to Champions League group stage
3	Hamburger SV	34	16	11	7	63	39	+24	59	Qualification to Champions League third qualifying round
4	1860 Munich	34	14	11	9	55	48	+7	53	Qualification to Champions League third qualifying round
5	1. FC Kaiserslautern	34	15	5	14	54	59	−5	50	Qualification to UEFA Cup first round

Source: www.dfb.de
Rules for classification: 1) points; 2) goal difference; 3) number of goals scored.
(C) Champions
