= Jörg Bode =

Jörg Bode may refer to:

- Jörg Bode (politician) (born 1970), Deputy Prime Minister of Lower Saxony
- Jörg Bode (footballer) (born 1969), German footballer
