= Erich Hänel =

German footballer (1915–2003)

Personal information
- Date of birth: 31 October 1915
- Place of birth: Chemnitz, Germany
- Date of death: 17 March 2003 (aged 87)
- Position: Forward

Senior career*
| Years | Team | Apps | (Gls) |
| 1932–1950 | BC Hartha | | |
| 1950–1953 | Bremer SV | | |
| 1953–1958 | VfB Oldenburg | | |

International career
| 1939 | Germany | 3 | (1) |

Managerial career
- 1961–1962: Bremer SV
- 1962-1965: Blumenthaler SV
- 1965–1967: VfL Oldenburg
- 1967–1972: Werder Bremen II
- * Club domestic league appearances and goals

Erich Hänel (31 October 1915 – 17 March 2003) was a German football player and coach. A forward, he made three appearances scoring one goal for the Germany national team. Hänel coached several different football clubs in Bremen, including Blumenthaler SV, Bremer SV, as well as some clubs from the Lower Saxony area, for example SV Atlas Delmenhorst, Victoria Oldenburg and VfB Oldenburg. His son Klaus Hänel was also a professional footballer, mainly for Werder Bremen.
