= Richard Golz =

German footballer (born 1968)

Personal information
- Date of birth: 5 June 1968 (age 58)
- Place of birth: West Berlin, West Germany
- Height: 1.99 m (6 ft 6 in)
- Position: Goalkeeper

Youth career
- 1975–1979: Wacker 04 Berlin
- 1979–1981: SC Tegel Berlin
- 1981–1983: Wacker 04 Berlin
- 1983–1985: SC Tegel Berlin
- 1985–1987: Hamburger SV

Senior career*
Years	Team	Apps	(Gls)
1987–1998	Hamburger SV	273	(0)
1998–2006	SC Freiburg	220	(0)
2006–2008	Hannover 96	0	(0)
Total		493	(0)

International career
1987–1990	West Germany U-21	6	(0)

Managerial career
- 2008–2013: Hamburger SV II (assistant)
- 2013–2015: Hertha BSC (goalkeeping coach)
- * Club domestic league appearances and goals

Richard Golz (born 5 June 1968) is a German former professional footballer who played as a goalkeeper. He had a long career in German football, spending the vast majority with Hamburger SV and SC Freiburg. Today, he is a sport director of German fourth-tier Altona 93.

== Playing career ==
Born in Berlin, Golz was discovered by Hamburger SV youth coach Gerd-Volker Schock and joined the club in 1985, studying at the Gymnasium Heidberg, like many HSV youngsters. He made his professional debut on 1 August 1987 in a 5–2 defeat to Schalke 04 and managed five appearances in his debut season. By the October of his second season, he had claimed the number one jersey that he would retain for almost a decade.

Although the club did not manage to win any trophies during this period, Golz achieved several top five finishes here and enjoyed European action in the 1991–92 UEFA Cup where Hamburger SV reached the third round (their exit at the hands of Sigma Olomouc was a doubly unhappy occasion for Golz as he was sent off).

In the 1997–98 season Golz lost his first choice position, as Hamburg signed Hans-Jörg Butt. Golz was relegated to reserve status at this point, making just one final appearance for the HSV on 31 January 1998 in a 3–0 defeat at Bayern Munich. After over ten years and 273 Bundesliga games, Golz's time at Hamburg was up and he moved onto newly promoted SC Freiburg.

Golz immediately got back into first team action with his new club, as they enjoyed four years at the top level, before sliding back down to the 2. Bundesliga in 2002. However, Golz was an ever-present as they immediately won promotion back as champions. He and the club survived for two further seasons before again being relegated in 2005.

The following year saw Golz activate a clause he had previously put in his contract guaranteeing him a one-year position in the club's marketing department. He made only six further appearances for the team as new signing Alexander Walke replaced him after 219 games for the club.

Golz added to his new off the field role by gaining the German Football Association football coaching licence (A-list), which built upon the sports management open university course he had completed in 2000. However, his position within the club was not extended beyond the initial year and he seized the chance to reactivate his playing career by joining top flight Hannover 96 in August 2006 as a backup goalkeeper, but he made no appearances until his contract ran out in 2008.

== Coaching career ==
On 4 June 2013, he was appointed as the goalkeeping coach of Hertha BSC. From 2016 until 2017, Golz was a goalkeeper coach of the Romania national team. On 5 May 2020, he was appointed as a sports director of Altona 93, a side from the fourth-tier German Regionalliga Nord.

== Career statistics ==
Appearances and goals by club, season and competition
Club	Season	League			Cup		Europe		Other		Total	
Club	Season	Division	Apps	Goals	Apps	Goals	Apps	Goals	Apps	Goals	Apps	Goals
Hamburger SV	1987–88	Bundesliga	5	0	0	0	—		1	0	6	0
Hamburger SV	1988–89	Bundesliga	22	0	3	0	—		—		25	0
Hamburger SV	1989–90	Bundesliga	34	0	1	0	8	0	—		43	0
Hamburger SV	1990–91	Bundesliga	33	0	4	0	—		—		37	0
Hamburger SV	1991–92	Bundesliga	30	0	1	0	6	0	—		37	0
Hamburger SV	1992–93	Bundesliga	32	0	1	0	—		—		33	0
Hamburger SV	1993–94	Bundesliga	34	0	3	0	—		—		37	0
Hamburger SV	1994–95	Bundesliga	17	0	0	0	0	0	—		17	0
Hamburger SV	1995–96	Bundesliga	33	0	1	0	—		—		34	0
Hamburger SV	1996–97	Bundesliga	32	0	4	0	6	0	—		42	0
Hamburger SV	1997–98	Bundesliga	1	0	0	0	1	0	—		2	0
Hamburger SV	Total		273	0	18	0	21	0	1	0	313	0
SC Freiburg	1998–99	Bundesliga	34	0	2	0	—		—		36	0
SC Freiburg	1999–2000	Bundesliga	33	0	4	0	—		—		37	0
SC Freiburg	2000–01	Bundesliga	34	0	4	0	—		—		38	0
SC Freiburg	2001–02	Bundesliga	24	0	1	0	6	0	1	0	32	0
SC Freiburg	2002–03	2. Bundesliga	34	0	3	0	—		—		37	0
SC Freiburg	2003–04	Bundesliga	23	0	2	0	—		—		25	0
SC Freiburg	2004–05	Bundesliga	32	0	3	0	—		—		35	0
SC Freiburg	2005–06	2. Bundesliga	6	0	0	0	—		—		6	0
SC Freiburg	Total		220	0	19	0	6	0	1	0	246	0
Hannover 96	2006–07	2. Bundesliga	0	0	0	0	—		—		0	0
Hannover 96	2007–08	2. Bundesliga	0	0	0	0	—		—		0	0
Hannover 96	Total		0	0	0	0	—		—		0	0
Career total			493	0	37	0	27	0	2	0	559	0

== Honours ==
=== Player ===
SC Freiburg

- 2. Bundesliga: 2002–03
