= Karlheinz Meininger =

German footballer

Personal information
- Date of birth: 1 February 1953 (age 73)
- Place of birth: Zwiesel, Germany
- Position: Forward

Senior career*
Years	Team	Apps	(Gls)
1972–1974	1869 Munich		
1974–1976	1. FC Nürnberg	49	(21)
1976–1978	Werder Bremen	52	(12)
1978–1981	Rot-Weiss Essen	86	(31)
- * Club domestic league appearances and goals

Karlheinz Meininger (born 1 February 1953) is a German former professional footballer who played as a forward.

== Career ==
Between 1981 and 1994 Meininger was with Atlas Delmenhorst, first as a player and later as assistant coach and manager.

== Personal life ==
As of September 2018, he was working in a football school in Zwiesel, Bavaria.
