= 2004–05 Bundesliga =

42nd season of the Bundesliga

Bundesliga
- Season: 2004–05
- Dates: 6 August 2004 – 21 May 2005
- Teams: 18
- Champions: Bayern Munich; 18th Bundesliga title 19th German title
- Relegated: Bochum; Hansa Rostock; Freiburg
- Champions League: Bayern Munich; Schalke 04; SV Werder Bremen
- UEFA Cup: Hertha BSC; Stuttgart; Bayer Leverkusen; Mainz
- Matches: 306
- Goals: 890 (2.91 per match)
- Top goalscorer: Marek Mintál (24 goals)

The 2004–05 Bundesliga was the 42nd season of the Bundesliga, Germany's premier football league. It began on 6 August 2004 and concluded on 21 May 2005.

== Teams ==
Eighteen teams competed in the league – the top fifteen teams from the previous season and the three teams promoted from the 2. Bundesliga. The promoted teams were 1. FC Nürnberg, Arminia Bielefeld and 1. FSV Mainz 05. 1. FC Nürnberg and Arminia Bielefeld returned to the top flight after an absence of one year while 1. FSV Mainz 05 played in the top flight for the first time in history. They replaced Eintracht Frankfurt and 1. FC Köln (both teams relegated after a season's presence) and 1860 Munich (ending their top flight spell of ten years).

== Team overview ==
Location of teams in Bundesliga 2004–05

Club	Location	Ground	Capacity
Hertha BSC	Berlin	Olympiastadion	76,000
Arminia Bielefeld*	Bielefeld	SchücoArena	26,600
VfL Bochum	Bochum	Ruhrstadion	36,000
SV Werder Bremen	Bremen	Weserstadion	42,100
Borussia Dortmund	Dortmund	Westfalenstadion	68,600
SC Freiburg	Freiburg	badenova-Stadion	25,000
Hamburger SV	Hamburg	AOL Arena	62,000
Hannover 96	Hanover	AWD-Arena	60,400
1. FC Kaiserslautern	Kaiserslautern	Fritz-Walter-Stadion	41,500
Bayer 04 Leverkusen	Leverkusen	BayArena	22,500
1. FSV Mainz 05*	Mainz	Stadion am Bruchweg	20,300
Borussia Mönchengladbach	Mönchengladbach	Stadion im Borussia-Park	54,067
FC Bayern Munich	Munich	Olympiastadion	63,000
1. FC Nürnberg*	Nuremberg	Frankenstadion	44,700
FC Hansa Rostock	Rostock	Ostseestadion	25,850
FC Schalke 04	Gelsenkirchen	Arena AufSchalke	61,973
VfB Stuttgart	Stuttgart	Gottlieb-Daimler-Stadion	53,700
VfL Wolfsburg	Wolfsburg	Volkswagen Arena	30,000

(*) Promoted from 2. Bundesliga.

=== Personnel and sponsoring ===
Team	Manager	Kit manufacturer	Shirt sponsor
Arminia Bielefeld	(Germany) Frank Geideck	Uhlsport	Krombacher
Bayer 04 Leverkusen	(Germany) Klaus Augenthaler	Adidas	RWE
FC Bayern Munich	(Germany) Felix Magath	Adidas	Deutsche Telekom
VfL Bochum	(Germany) Peter Neururer	Nike	DWS
Borussia Dortmund	(Netherlands) Bert van Marwijk	Nike	E.ON
Borussia Mönchengladbach	(Germany) Horst Köppel	Lotto	Jever/Kyocera
SC Freiburg	(Germany) Volker Finke	Jako	Suzuki
Hamburger SV	(Germany) Thomas Doll	Nike	Abu Dhabi Investment Group
Hannover 96	(Germany) Ewald Lienen	Uhlsport	TUI Group
FC Hansa Rostock	(Germany) Jörg Berger	Jako	Vita Cola
Hertha BSC	(Germany) Falko Götz	Nike	Arcor
1. FC Kaiserslautern	(Germany) Hans-Werner Moser	Kappa	Deutsche Vermögensberatung
1. FSV Mainz 05	(Germany) Jürgen Klopp	Lotto	DBV-Winterthur
1. FC Nürnberg	(Germany) Wolfgang Wolf	Adidas	mister*lady Jeans
FC Schalke 04	(Germany) Ralf Rangnick	Adidas	Victoria Versicherung
VfB Stuttgart	(Germany) Matthias Sammer	Puma	Debitel
SV Werder Bremen	(Germany) Thomas Schaaf	Kappa	KiK
VfL Wolfsburg	(Belgium) Eric Gerets	Nike	Volkswagen/Volkswagen GTI

== League table ==
Pos	Team	Pld	W	D	L	GF	GA	GD	Pts	Qualification or relegation
1	Bayern Munich (C)	34	24	5	5	75	33	+42	77	Qualification to Champions League group stage
2	Schalke 04	34	20	3	11	56	46	+10	63	Qualification to Champions League group stage
3	Werder Bremen	34	18	5	11	68	37	+31	59	Qualification to Champions League third qualifying round
4	Hertha BSC	34	15	13	6	59	31	+28	58	Qualification to UEFA Cup first round (Note: Since DFB Cup winners Bayern Munich and finalists Schalke 04 both qualified for the Champions League, the UEFA Cup place for the cup-winners was given to 6th placed Bayer Leverkusen.)
5	VfB Stuttgart	34	17	7	10	54	40	+14	58	Qualification to UEFA Cup first round
6	Bayer Leverkusen	34	16	9	9	65	44	+21	57	Qualification to UEFA Cup first round
7	Borussia Dortmund	34	15	10	9	47	44	+3	55	Qualification to Intertoto Cup third round
8	Hamburger SV	34	16	3	15	55	50	+5	51	Qualification to Intertoto Cup second round
9	VfL Wolfsburg	34	15	3	16	49	51	−2	48	Qualification to Intertoto Cup second round
10	Hannover 96	34	13	6	15	34	36	−2	45	
11	Mainz 05	34	12	7	15	50	55	−5	43	Qualification to UEFA Cup first qualifying round (Note: UEFA awarded another UEFA Cup place to the Bundesliga via a random draw among the fairest associations in 2004–05. The place was given to Mainz 05 for winning the national Fair-play competition in this season.)
12	1. FC Kaiserslautern	34	12	6	16	43	52	−9	42	
13	Arminia Bielefeld	34	11	7	16	37	49	−12	40	
14	1. FC Nürnberg	34	10	8	16	55	63	−8	38	
15	Borussia Mönchengladbach	34	8	12	14	35	51	−16	36	
16	VfL Bochum (R)	34	9	8	17	47	68	−21	35	Relegation to 2. Bundesliga
17	Hansa Rostock (R)	34	7	9	18	31	65	−34	30	Relegation to 2. Bundesliga
18	SC Freiburg (R)	34	3	9	22	30	75	−45	18	Relegation to 2. Bundesliga

Rules for classification: 1) points; 2) goal difference; 3) number of goals scored.
(C) Champions; (R) Relegated

== Results ==
Home \ Away	BSC	DSC	BOC	SVW	BVB	SCF	HSV	H96	FCK	B04	M05	BMG	FCB	FCN	ROS	S04	VFB	WOB
Hertha BSC	—	3–0	2–2	1–1	0–1	3–1	4–1	0–0	1–1	3–1	1–1	6–0	0–0	2–1	1–1	4–1	0–0	3–1
Arminia Bielefeld	1–0	—	1–2	2–1	1–0	3–1	3–4	0–1	0–2	1–0	1–1	0–0	3–1	3–1	1–1	0–2	0–2	1–2
VfL Bochum	2–2	1–1	—	1–4	2–2	3–1	1–2	1–0	1–1	2–2	2–6	3–0	1–3	3–1	0–1	0–2	2–0	5–1
Werder Bremen	0–1	3–0	4–0	—	2–0	4–1	1–1	3–0	1–1	2–2	0–0	2–0	1–2	4–1	3–2	1–0	1–2	1–2
Borussia Dortmund	2–1	1–1	1–0	1–0	—	2–0	0–2	1–1	4–2	1–0	3–0	1–1	2–2	2–2	2–1	0–1	0–2	1–2
SC Freiburg	1–3	2–3	1–1	0–6	2–2	—	1–1	0–0	1–2	1–3	1–2	1–1	0–1	2–3	0–0	2–3	2–0	1–0
Hamburger SV	2–1	0–2	0–1	1–2	2–3	4–0	—	0–2	2–1	1–0	2–1	0–0	0–2	4–3	3–0	1–2	2–1	3–1
Hannover 96	0–1	0–1	3–0	1–4	1–3	2–2	2–1	—	3–1	0–3	2–0	2–1	0–1	1–0	0–1	1–0	0–0	3–0
1. FC Kaiserslautern	0–2	2–1	1–2	1–2	1–0	3–0	2–1	0–2	—	0–0	2–0	1–0	0–4	1–3	2–1	2–0	2–3	0–0
Bayer Leverkusen	3–3	3–2	4–0	2–1	0–1	4–1	3–0	2–1	2–0	—	2–0	5–1	4–1	2–2	3–0	0–3	1–1	2–1
Mainz 05	0–3	0–0	1–0	2–1	1–1	5–0	2–1	2–0	3–2	2–0	—	1–1	2–4	0–1	3–1	2–1	2–3	0–2
Borussia Mönchengladbach	0–0	1–0	2–2	3–1	2–3	3–2	1–3	0–2	2–0	1–1	1–1	—	2–0	2–1	2–2	1–3	2–0	1–0
Bayern Munich	1–1	1–0	3–1	1–0	5–0	3–1	3–0	3–0	3–1	2–0	4–2	2–1	—	6–3	3–1	0–1	2–2	2–0
1. FC Nürnberg	0–0	1–2	2–1	1–2	2–2	3–0	1–3	1–1	1–3	2–4	1–2	0–0	2–2	—	3–0	0–2	1–1	4–0
Hansa Rostock	2–1	1–1	3–1	0–4	1–1	0–0	0–6	1–3	2–3	0–2	2–0	0–0	0–2	0–2	—	2–2	2–1	1–2
Schalke 04	1–3	2–1	3–2	2–1	1–2	1–1	1–2	1–0	2–1	3–3	2–1	3–2	1–0	4–1	0–2	—	3–2	3–0
VfB Stuttgart	1–0	2–1	5–2	1–2	2–0	1–0	2–0	1–0	1–1	3–0	4–2	1–0	1–3	2–4	4–0	3–0	—	0–0
VfL Wolfsburg	2–3	5–0	3–0	2–3	1–2	0–1	1–0	1–0	2–1	2–2	4–3	2–1	0–3	0–1	4–0	3–0	3–0	—

Source: DFB
Legend: Blue = home team win; Yellow = draw; Red = away team win.

== Overall ==
- Most wins – Bayern Munich (24)
- Fewest wins – SC Freiburg (3)
- Most draws – Hertha BSC (13)
- Fewest draws – Schalke 04, Hamburger SV and VfL Wolfsburg (3)
- Most losses – SC Freiburg (22)
- Fewest losses – Bayern Munich (5)
- Most goals scored – Bayern Munich (75)
- Fewest goals scored – SC Freiburg (30)
- Most goals conceded – SC Freiburg (75)
- Fewest goals conceded – Bayern Munich (33)

== Top scorers ==
Rank	Player	Club	Goals
1	(Slovakia) Marek Mintál	Nürnberg	24
2	(Netherlands) Roy Makaay	Bayern Munich	22
3	(Bulgaria) Dimitar Berbatov	Bayer Leverkusen	20
4	(Brazil) Marcelinho	Hertha BSC	18
5	(Germany) (Poland) Miroslav Klose	Werder Bremen	15
5	(South Africa) Delron Buckley	Arminia Bielefeld	15
5	(Czech Republic) Jan Koller	Borussia Dortmund	15
5	(Ukraine) Andriy Voronin	Bayer Leverkusen	15
9	(Brazil) Aílton	Schalke 04	14
10	(Germany) Michael Ballack	Bayern Munich	13
10	(Germany) Kevin Kurányi	VfB Stuttgart	13

== Awards ==
=== Team of the Year ===
Kicker Team of the Season
Goalkeeper	(Germany) Simon Jentzsch (VfL Wolfsburg)				
Defenders	(Belgium) Daniel Van Buyten (Hamburger SV)		(Brazil) Lúcio (Bayern Munich)		(Brazil) Marcelo Bordon (Schalke 04)
Midfielders	(Germany) Fabian Ernst (Werder Bremen)	(Germany) Michael Ballack (Bayern Munich)	(Slovakia) Marek Mintál (1. FC Nürnberg)	(Brazil) Lincoln (Schalke 04)	(Brazil) Marcelinho (Hertha BSC)
Forwards	(Netherlands) Roy Makaay (Bayern Munich)			(Bulgaria) Dimitar Berbatov (Bayer Leverkusen)	

== Attendances ==
No.	Team	Average	Change	Highest
1	Borussia Dortmund	77,235	-3,0%	83,000
2	Schalke 04	61,383	0,6%	61,524
3	Bayern München	53,294	-3,3%	63,000
4	Borussia Mönchengladbach	49,168	52,3%	53,466
5	Hamburger SV	48,927	1,8%	55,800
6	Hertha BSC	48,474	20,9%	74,500
7	VfB Stuttgart	41,310	-3,8%	48,600
8	Werder Bremen	39,853	5,8%	42,109
9	Hannover 96	36,205	55,0%	49,854
10	1. FC Kaiserslautern	35,630	-7,7%	46,615
11	1. FC Nürnberg	30,134	86,6%	44,650
12	VfL Bochum	26,064	-4,1%	32,645
13	VfL Wolfsburg	24,134	4,7%	30,000
14	SC Freiburg	22,924	-5,1%	25,500
15	Arminia Bielefeld	22,583	65,5%	26,601
16	Bayer Leverkusen	22,500	0,0%	22,500
17	Hansa Rostock	20,647	-7,7%	30,000
18	Mainz 05	20,159	36,7%	20,300
