= 2003–04 Hamburger SV season =

Hamburger SV
2003–04 season
- Head coach: Kurt Jara (until 22 October); Klaus Toppmöller (from 23 October)
- Stadium: Volksparkstadion
- Bundesliga: 8th
- DFB-Pokal: Second round
- Top goalscorer: Bernardo Romeo (11)

The 2003–04 season was the 85th season in the history of Hamburger SV and the club's second consecutive season in the top flight of German football. In addition to the domestic league, Hamburger SV participated in this season's edition of the DFB-Pokal.

== Competitions ==
=== Overall record ===
Competition	First match	Last match	Starting round	Final position	Record							
Competition	First match	Last match	Starting round	Final position	Pld	W	D	L	GF	GA	GD	Win %
Bundesliga	2 August 2003	22 May 2004	Matchday 1	8th	34	14	7	13	47	60	−13	41.18
DFB-Pokal	1 September 2003	3 December 2003	First round	Round of 16	3	2	0	1	5	5	+0	66.67
Total					37	16	7	14	52	65	−13	43.24

Source: Competitions

=== Bundesliga ===
==== League table ====
Pos	Team	Pld	W	D	L	GF	GA	GD	Pts	Qualification or relegation
6	Borussia Dortmund	34	16	7	11	59	48	+11	55	Qualification to Intertoto Cup third round
7	Schalke 04	34	13	11	10	49	42	+7	50	Qualification to Intertoto Cup third round
8	Hamburger SV	34	14	7	13	47	60	−13	49	Qualification to Intertoto Cup third round
9	Hansa Rostock	34	12	8	14	55	54	+1	44	
10	VfL Wolfsburg	34	13	3	18	56	61	−5	42	Qualification to Intertoto Cup second round (Note: Hansa Rostock did not apply for Intertoto Cup, so the place was given to VfL Wolfsburg.)

Source: kicker.de
Rules for classification: 1) points; 2) goal difference; 3) number of goals scored.

==== Results summary ====
Overall								Home						Away					
Pld	W	D	L	GF	GA	GD	Pts	W	D	L	GF	GA	GD	W	D	L	GF	GA	GD
0	0	0	0	0	0	0	0	0	0	0	0	0	0	0	0	0	0	0	0

Source: DFB

==== Results by round ====
Round	1	2	3	4	5	6	7	8	9	10	11	12	13	14	15	16	17
Ground	H	A	A	H	A	H	A	H	A	H	A	H	A	H	A	H	A
Result	L	D	L	L	L	W	D	W	L	D	L	W	W	D	D	W	W
Position	16	14	15	17	18	17	17	12	13	13	13	12	11	12	13		

Source: DFB
A = Away; H = Home; W = Win; D = Draw; L = Loss

==== Matches ====
2 August 2003 1	Hamburger SV	0–3	Hannover 96	Hamburg
CET (UTC+1)				Stadium: Volksparkstadion

9 August 2003 2	VfL Bochum	1–1	Hamburger SV	Bochum
CET (UTC+1)				Stadium: Ruhrstadion

17 August 2003 3	VfL Wolfsburg	5–1	Hamburger SV	Wolfsburg
CET (UTC+1)				Stadium: Volkswagen Arena

24 August 2003 4	Hamburger SV	0–2	Bayern Munich	Hamburg
CET (UTC+1)				Stadium: Volksparkstadion

13 September 2003 5	Bayer Leverkusen	1–0	Hamburger SV	Leverkusen
CET (UTC+1)				Stadium: BayArena

21 September 2003 6	Hamburger SV	2–1	Hansa Rostock	Hamburg
CET (UTC+1)				Stadium: Volksparkstadion

28 September 2003 7	Hertha BSC	1–1	Hamburger SV	Berlin
CET (UTC+1)				Stadium: Olympiastadion

4 October 2003 8	Hamburger SV	2–1	Borussia Mönchengladbach	Hamburg
CET (UTC+1)				Stadium: Volksparkstadion

19 October 2003 9	1. FC Kaiserslautern	4–0	Hamburger SV	Kaiserslautern
CET (UTC+1)				Stadium: Fritz-Walter-Stadion

25 October 2003 10	Hamburger SV	2–2	Schalke 04	Hamburg
CET (UTC+1)				Stadium: Volksparkstadion

2 November 2003 11	Borussia Dortmund	3–2	Hamburger SV	Dortmund
CET (UTC+1)				Stadium: Westfalenstadion

8 November 2003 12	Hamburger SV	3–1	1860 München	Hamburg
CET (UTC+1)				Stadium: Volksparkstadion

22 November 2003 13	1. FC Köln	0–1	Hamburger SV	Cologne
CET (UTC+1)				Stadium: RheinEnergieStadion

29 November 2003 14	Hamburger SV	1–1	Werder Bremen	Hamburg
CET (UTC+1)				Stadium: Volksparkstadion

6 December 2003 15	VfB Stuttgart	2–2	Hamburger SV	Stuttgart
CET (UTC+1)				Stadium: Gottlieb-Daimler-Stadion

13 December 2003 16	Hamburger SV	4–1	SC Freiburg	Hamburg
CET (UTC+1)				Stadium: Volksparkstadion

16 December 2003 17	Eintracht Frankfurt	2–3	Hamburger SV	Frankfurt
CET (UTC+1)				Stadium: Waldstadion

=== DFB-Pokal ===
1 September 2003 First round	Dynamo Dresden	0–1	Hamburger SV	Dresden
CET (UTC+1)				Stadium: Rudolf-Harbig-Stadion; Attendance: 17,500; Referee: Florian Meyer

29 October 2003 Second round	SpVgg Unterhaching	2–4	Hamburger SV	Munich
CET (UTC+1)				Attendance: 6,000; Referee: Dominik Marks

3 December 2003 Round of 16	Bayern Munich	3–0	Hamburger SV	Munich
CET (UTC+1)				Stadium: Olympiastadion; Attendance: 8,000; Referee: Lutz Wagner
