= Bernd Windhausen =

German footballer (1941–2014)

Personal information
- Date of birth: 22 September 1941
- Place of birth: Duderstadt, Germany
- Date of death: 4 November 2014 (aged 73)
- Height: 1.79 m (5 ft 10 in)
- Position: Forward

Senior career*
Years	Team	Apps	(Gls)
1959–1963	VfL Duderstadt		
1963–1964	Borussia Fulda		
1964–1967	SpVgg Fürth		
1967–1969	1. FC Kaiserslautern	56	(14)
1969–1971	Werder Bremen	29	(8)
- * Club domestic league appearances and goals

Bernd Windhausen (22 September 1941 – 4 November 2014) was a German professional footballer who played as a forward.
