= Werner Görts =

German footballer

Personal information
- Date of birth: 15 January 1942 (age 84)
- Place of birth: Wuppertal, Germany
- Height: 1.78 m (5 ft 10 in)
- Position: Forward

Youth career
- 1959–1961: Cronenberger SC

Senior career*
Years	Team	Apps	(Gls)
1962–1965	Bayer Leverkusen	41	(8)
1965–1966	Borussia Neunkirchen	28	(1)
1966–1978	Werder Bremen	363	(73)
Total		432	(82)
- * Club domestic league appearances and goals

Werner Görts (born 15 January 1942 in Wuppertal) is a German former footballer who played as a forward. He spent 13 seasons in the Bundesliga with Borussia Neunkirchen and Werder Bremen.

== Honours ==
Werder Bremen

- Bundesliga runner-up: 1967–68
