= Marijan Kovačević =

German-Croatian footballer

Personal information
- Full name: Marijan Kovačević
- Date of birth: 31 August 1973 (age 53)
- Place of birth: Hamburg, West Germany
- Height: 1.84 m (6 ft 0 in)
- Position: Midfielder

Senior career*
Years	Team	Apps	(Gls)
1993–1997	Hamburger SV	54	(1)
1997–1999	VfL Wolfsburg	45	(7)
1999–2001	MSV Duisburg	52	(5)
2002	Široki Brijeg	15	(2)
2003	União da Madeira	31	(2)
2004	Jahn Regensburg	7	(1)
2004	Admira Wacker Mödling	18	(2)
2005	Enosis Neon Paralimni	13	(0)
2005–2009	VfB Stuttgart II	115	(4)
2008	VfB Stuttgart	1	(0)
- * Club domestic league appearances and goals

Marijan Kovačević (born 31 August 1973) is a German-Croatian former footballer.

== Club career ==
He played for German clubs like Hamburger SV, VfL Wolfsburg, MSV Duisburg and SSV Jahn Regensburg, Austrian club Admira Wacker Mödling, Cypriot club Enosis Neon Paralimni FC, Portuguese club União da Madeira and Bosnian and Herzegovinian club Široki Brijeg.
