= Carsten Kober =

German footballer

Personal information
- Date of birth: 11 October 1967 (age 59)
- Place of birth: Bad Schwartau, West Germany
- Height: 1.83 m (6 ft 0 in)
- Position: Defender

Senior career*
Years	Team	Apps	(Gls)
–1985	VfB Lübeck		
1985–1987	Hamburger SV II		
1987–1996	Hamburger SV	223	(1)
1996–1997	Hertha BSC	20	(1)
1997–1998	VfL Osnabrück		

International career
	Germany U-21	1	(0)
- * Club domestic league appearances and goals

Carsten Kober (born 11 October 1967) is a German former professional footballer who played as a defender.
