= Willi Schröder =

German footballer (1928–1999)

Personal information
- Date of birth: 28 December 1928
- Place of birth: Berlin, Germany
- Date of death: 20 October 1999 (aged 70)
- Place of death: Bremen, Germany
- Height: 1.69 m (5 ft 7 in)
- Position: Forward

Youth career
- –1946: Blau-Weiß Berlin

Senior career*
Years	Team	Apps	(Gls)
1946–1953	ATSV 1860 Bremen		(90+)
1954–1963	Werder Bremen	295	(132)
1963–1965	Bremerhaven 93		
Total		295+	(222+)

International career
	West Germany amateur	7	(6)
	West Germany B	7	(5)
1951–1957	West Germany	12	(3)
- * Club domestic league appearances and goals

Willi Schröder (28 December 1928 – 20 October 1999) was a German footballer who played as a forward.

== Club career ==
Schröder was a member of the 1961 Werder Bremen DFB-Pokal winning squad. It was Werder Bremen's first DFB-Pokal win, and earned them a spot as a charter member of the newly reformed Bundesliga.

Schröder played 54 games and scored 20 goals as a midfielder for Werder Bremen in the then Oberliga Nord for three seasons from 1960 to 1963. He also played 14 games with three goals as a striker in the Regionalliga Nord for TuS Bremerhaven 93 in 1963–64.

== International career ==
Schröder also had 12 career caps in international play for the West Germany national team, with three goals. He was part of the West German squad at the 1952 Summer Olympics.
