= Erwin Piechowiak =

German footballer (1936–2021)

Personal information
- Date of birth: 15 November 1936
- Place of birth: Hamburg, Germany
- Date of death: 31 March 2021 (aged 84)
- Position: Defender

Senior career*
Years	Team	Apps	(Gls)
1957–1966	Hamburger SV		
1966–1969	SC Sperber		
- * Club domestic league appearances and goals

Erwin Piechowiak (15 November 1936 – 31 March 2021) was a German professional footballer who played as a defender.

== Career ==
Born in Hamburg, Piechowiak played for Hamburger SV and SC Sperber. With HSV he won the 1960 German football championship.
