= Bernd Dörfel =

German footballer

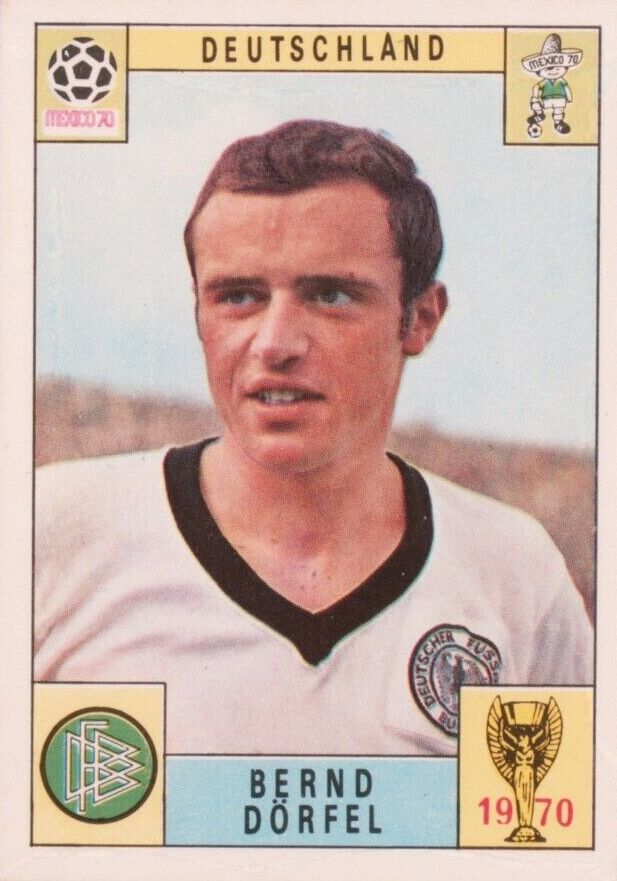
- Dörfel in 1969

Personal information
- Date of birth: 18 December 1944 (age 81)
- Place of birth: Büsum, Germany
- Height: 1.78 m (5 ft 10 in)
- Position: Forward

Youth career
- Grün-Weiß 07 Hamburg
- Hamburger SV

Senior career*
Years	Team	Apps	(Gls)
1963–1968	Hamburger SV	88	(17)
1968–1970	Eintracht Braunschweig	51	(4)
1970–1975	Servette	61	(33)

International career
1966	West Germany U-23	1	(0)
1966–1969	West Germany	15	(2)
- * Club domestic league appearances and goals

Bernd Dörfel (born 18 December 1944) is a German former professional footballer who played as a forward.

== Club career ==
Dörfel was born in Büsum. He spent seven seasons in the Bundesliga with Hamburger SV and Eintracht Braunschweig.

== International career ==
Dörfel represented West Germany 15 times, including UEFA Euro 1968 qualifier against Albania, 1970 FIFA World Cup qualifiers against Austria (twice), Scotland and Cyprus and ten friendlies. He was not selected to the 1970 FIFA World Cup final squad because of his poor form in the 1969–70 season.

== Honours ==
- UEFA Cup Winners' Cup finalist: 1967–68
- DFB-Pokal finalist: 1966–67

== Trivia ==
His brother Charly Dörfel was also an international footballer (they are among 14 sets of siblings to have played for Germany).
