= Hans-Werner Moser =

German footballer and manager

Personal information
- Date of birth: 24 September 1965 (age 61)
- Place of birth: Kusel, West Germany
- Height: 1.76 m (5 ft 9 in)
- Positions: Defender; midfielder

Youth career
- 1970–1980: SV Rammelsbach
- 1980–1984: 1. FC Kaiserslautern

Senior career*
| Years | Team | Apps | (Gls) |
| 1983–1988 | 1. FC Kaiserslautern | 115 | (4) |
| 1988–1990 | Hamburger SV | 47 | (2) |
| 1990–1995 | SG Wattenscheid 09 | 132 | (5) |
| 1995–1996 | SC Verl | 15 | (0) |
| Total | | 309 | (11) |

International career
| 1984–1986 | Germany U-21 | 9 | (0) |

Managerial career
- 1997–1998: SV Sodingen
- 2001–2002: Westfalia Herne
- 2002–2003: Darmstadt 98
- 2003–2006: 1. FC Kaiserslautern II
- 2005: 1. FC Kaiserslautern (caretaker)
- 2008–2009: SV Wehen Wiesbaden II
- 2009–2010: SV Wehen Wiesbaden (caretaker)
- 2016–2020: 1. FC Kaiserslautern II
- * Club domestic league appearances and goals

Hans-Werner Moser (born 24 September 1965, in Kusel) is a German football coach and former player.
