= 1993–94 Bundesliga =

31st season of the Bundesliga

Bundesliga
- Season: 1993–94
- Dates: 6 August 1993 – 7 May 1994
- Champions: Bayern Munich; 12th Bundesliga title 13th German title
- Relegated: 1. FC Nürnberg; Wattenscheid 09; VfB Leipzig
- Champions League: Bayern Munich
- Cup Winners' Cup: Werder Bremen
- UEFA Cup: 1. FC Kaiserslautern; Bayer Leverkusen; Borussia Dortmund; Eintracht Frankfurt
- Matches: 306
- Goals: 876 (2.86 per match)
- Top goalscorer: Stefan Kuntz, Tony Yeboah (18)
- Biggest home win: six games with a differential of +5 each (6–1 once, 5–0 five times)
- Biggest away win: Duisburg 1–7 K'lautern
- Highest scoring: Duisburg 1–7 K'lautern

The 1993–94 Bundesliga was the 31st season of the Bundesliga, Germany's premier football league. It began on 6 August 1993 and ended on 7 May 1994. SV Werder Bremen were the defending champions.

== Teams ==
VfL Bochum, Bayer 05 Uerdingen and 1. FC Saarbrücken were relegated to the 2. Bundesliga after finishing in the last three places. They were replaced by SC Freiburg, MSV Duisburg and VfB Leipzig.

Locations of teams in the 1993–94 Fußball-Bundesliga

Club	Location	Ground	Capacity
Bayer Leverkusen	Leverkusen	Ulrich-Haberland-Stadion	27,800
Bayern Munich	Munich	Olympiastadion	63,000
Borussia Dortmund	Dortmund	Westfalenstadion	42,800
Borussia Mönchengladbach	Mönchengladbach	Bökelbergstadion	34,500
Dynamo Dresden	Dresden	Rudolf-Harbig-Stadion	30,000
Eintracht Frankfurt	Frankfurt am Main	Waldstadion	62,000
SC Freiburg	Freiburg	Dreisamstadion	15,000
Hamburger SV	Hamburg	Volksparkstadion	62,000
1. FC Kaiserslautern	Kaiserslautern	Fritz-Walter-Stadion	38,500
Karlsruher SC	Karlsruhe	Wildparkstadion	40,000
1. FC Köln	Cologne	Müngersdorfer Stadion	55,000
VfB Leipzig	Leipzig	Zentralstadion	37,000
MSV Duisburg	Duisburg	Wedaustadion	31,500
1. FC Nürnberg	Nuremberg	Frankenstadion	55,000
FC Schalke 04	Gelsenkirchen	Parkstadion	70,000
VfB Stuttgart	Stuttgart	Neckarstadion	53,700
SG Wattenscheid 09	Bochum	Lohrheidestadion	15,000
Werder Bremen	Bremen	Weserstadion	32,000

== League table ==
Pos	Team	Pld	W	D	L	GF	GA	GD	Pts	Qualification or relegation
1	Bayern Munich (C)	34	17	10	7	68	37	+31	44	Qualification to Champions League group stage
2	1. FC Kaiserslautern	34	18	7	9	64	36	+28	43	Qualification to UEFA Cup first round
3	Bayer Leverkusen	34	14	11	9	60	47	+13	39	Qualification to UEFA Cup first round
4	Borussia Dortmund	34	15	9	10	49	45	+4	39	Qualification to UEFA Cup first round
5	Eintracht Frankfurt	34	15	8	11	57	41	+16	38	Qualification to UEFA Cup first round
6	Karlsruher SC	34	14	10	10	46	43	+3	38	
7	VfB Stuttgart	34	13	11	10	51	43	+8	37	
8	Werder Bremen	34	13	10	11	51	44	+7	36	Qualification to Cup Winners' Cup first round
9	MSV Duisburg	34	14	8	12	41	52	−11	36	
10	Borussia Mönchengladbach	34	14	7	13	65	59	+6	35	
11	1. FC Köln	34	14	6	14	49	51	−2	34	
12	Hamburger SV	34	13	8	13	48	52	−4	34	
13	Dynamo Dresden (Note: Dynamo Dresden were docked four points because of financial irregularities.)	34	10	14	10	33	44	−11	30	
14	Schalke 04	34	10	9	15	38	50	−12	29	
15	SC Freiburg	34	10	8	16	54	57	−3	28	
16	1. FC Nürnberg (R)	34	10	8	16	41	55	−14	28	Relegation to 2. Bundesliga
17	SG Wattenscheid 09 (R)	34	6	11	17	48	70	−22	23	Relegation to 2. Bundesliga
18	VfB Leipzig (R)	34	3	11	20	32	69	−37	17	Relegation to 2. Bundesliga

Source: www.dfb.de
Rules for classification: 1) points; 2) goal difference; 3) number of goals scored.
(C) Champions; (R) Relegated

== Results ==
Home \ Away	SVW	BVB	SGD	DUI	SGE	SCF	HSV	FCK	KSC	KOE	LEI	B04	BMG	FCB	FCN	S04	VFB	SGW
Werder Bremen	—	4–0	0–1	1–5	1–0	3–2	0–2	2–0	0–2	3–1	3–1	2–1	4–2	1–0	2–2	0–1	5–1	0–0
Borussia Dortmund	3–2	—	4–0	2–1	2–0	3–2	2–1	2–1	2–1	2–1	0–1	1–0	3–0	1–1	4–1	1–1	1–2	2–0
Dynamo Dresden	1–0	3–0	—	0–1	0–4	1–2	1–1	3–1	1–1	1–1	1–0	1–1	2–1	1–1	1–1	1–0	1–0	1–1
MSV Duisburg	1–0	2–2	1–1	—	1–0	0–2	0–1	1–7	1–2	0–0	2–1	2–2	2–0	2–2	1–0	1–0	2–2	2–1
Eintracht Frankfurt	2–2	2–0	3–2	1–2	—	3–0	1–1	1–0	3–1	0–3	2–1	2–0	0–3	2–2	1–1	1–3	0–0	5–1
SC Freiburg	0–0	4–1	0–1	1–2	1–3	—	0–1	2–3	3–3	2–4	1–0	1–0	3–3	3–1	0–0	2–3	2–1	4–1
Hamburger SV	1–1	0–0	1–1	0–1	3–0	1–1	—	1–3	1–1	2–4	3–0	2–1	1–3	1–2	5–2	4–1	3–2	2–1
1. FC Kaiserslautern	2–3	2–0	0–0	2–0	1–1	1–0	3–0	—	0–0	3–0	1–0	3–2	4–2	4–0	3–1	0–0	5–0	4–1
Karlsruher SC	0–3	3–3	1–0	5–0	1–0	2–1	2–0	1–1	—	2–0	3–2	2–0	1–0	1–1	3–2	0–0	0–0	2–0
1. FC Köln	2–0	2–0	0–1	1–0	2–3	2–0	3–0	0–2	2–1	—	3–1	1–1	0–4	0–4	0–1	1–1	3–1	3–2
VfB Leipzig	1–1	2–3	3–3	1–1	1–0	2–2	1–4	0–0	1–0	2–3	—	2–3	1–1	1–3	0–2	2–2	0–0	0–0
Bayer Leverkusen	2–2	2–1	1–1	2–1	2–2	2–1	1–2	3–2	3–1	2–1	3–1	—	0–1	2–1	4–0	5–1	1–1	1–1
Borussia Mönchengladbach	3–2	0–0	2–1	4–1	0–4	1–1	2–2	3–1	1–2	4–1	6–1	2–2	—	2–0	2–0	3–2	0–2	3–3
Bayern Munich	2–0	0–0	5–0	4–0	2–1	3–1	4–0	4–0	1–0	1–0	3–0	1–1	3–1	—	5–0 (Note: The Bayern Munich v 1. FC Nürnberg match from 23 April 1994, which finished with a score of 2–1, was annulled by the DFB and was required to be replayed due to Bayern Munich player Thomas Helmer scoring a ghost goal. The replay took place on 3 May 1994 and finished with a score of 5–0.)	2–0	1–3	3–3
1. FC Nürnberg	0–1	0–0	3–0	0–0	1–5	2–2	0–1	0–2	1–1	1–0	5–0	2–3	2–4	2–0	—	1–0	1–0	4–1
Schalke 04	1–1	1–0	0–0	1–3	1–3	1–3	1–0	2–0	2–0	1–2	3–1	1–1	2–1	1–1	1–2	—	0–1	4–1
VfB Stuttgart	0–0	2–2	3–0	4–0	0–2	0–4	4–0	1–1	3–0	1–1	0–0	1–4	3–0	2–2	1–0	3–0	—	3–0
SG Wattenscheid	2–2	1–2	1–1	0–2	0–0	3–1	3–1	0–2	5–1	2–2	2–2	1–2	3–1	1–3	2–1	3–0	2–4	—

Source: DFB
Legend: Blue = home team win; Yellow = draw; Red = away team win.

== Top goalscorers ==
18 goals

- (Germany) Stefan Kuntz (1. FC Kaiserslautern)
- (Ghana) Tony Yeboah (Eintracht Frankfurt)

17 goals

- (Switzerland) Stéphane Chapuisat (Borussia Dortmund)
- (Brazil) Paulo Sérgio (Bayer Leverkusen)
- (Austria) Toni Polster (1. FC Köln)

14 goals

- (Germany) Thomas von Heesen (Hamburger SV)

13 goals

- (Germany) Karsten Bäron (Hamburger SV)
- (Germany) Ulf Kirsten (Bayer Leverkusen)
- (Germany) Peter Közle (MSV Duisburg)
- (Poland) Marek Leśniak (SG Wattenscheid 09)
- (Senegal) Souleyman Sané (SG Wattenscheid 09)
- (Germany) Fritz Walter (VfB Stuttgart)
- (Argentina) Sergio Zárate (1. FC Nürnberg)

== Attendances ==
No.	Team	Attendance	Change	Highest
1	Bayern München	48,294	4.9%	63,000
2	Borussia Dortmund	42,074	2.7%	42,800
3	1. FC Nürnberg	36,124	8.7%	50,200
4	Schalke 04	35,501	-14.9%	65,000
5	1. FC Kaiserslautern	34,374	2.9%	40,500
6	Eintracht Frankfurt	31,596	24.5%	60,360
7	Hamburger SV	31,347	31.9%	60,000
8	1. FC Köln	31,065	4.2%	54,100
9	VfB Stuttgart	28,365	1.9%	53,700
10	Borussia Mönchengladbach	26,959	13.9%	34,500
11	Werder Bremen	24,400	11.6%	40,800
12	MSV Duisburg	23,299	95.0%	31,500
13	Karlsruher SC	22,012	-0.5%	35,000
14	Bayer Leverkusen	19,112	12.4%	27,400
15	Dynamo Dresden	15,984	2.1%	25,900
16	SC Freiburg	15,000	68.0%	15,000
17	Wattenscheid 09	11,912	7.3%	32,000
18	1. FC Lokomotive Leipzig	11,876	125.4%	37,000

== See also ==
- 1993–94 2. Bundesliga
- 1993–94 DFB-Pokal
