= Hans Schulz =

German footballer

Personal information
- Date of birth: 4 December 1942 (age 83)
- Place of birth: Germany
- Height: 1.80 m (5 ft 11 in)
- Position: Midfielder

Senior career*
Years	Team	Apps	(Gls)
1964–1966	Werder Bremen	31	(6)
1966–1971	Hamburger SV	109	(22)
1971–1974	Fortuna Düsseldorf	74	(12)
1974–1976	Alemannia Aachen	50	(7)
1976–1977	VSK Osterholz-Scharmbeck		
- * Club domestic league appearances and goals

Hans Schulz (born 4 December 1942) is a German former footballer who played as a midfielder for Werder Bremen, Hamburger SV and Fortuna Düsseldorf, Alemannia Aachen and VSK Osterholz-Scharmbeck.

Schulz played for Werder Bremen in the 1964–65 Bundesliga, and won a final with them.
