= Horst Bertl =

German footballer (1947–2022)

Personal information
- Date of birth: 24 March 1947
- Place of birth: Bremerhaven, Allied-occupied Germany
- Date of death: 6 February 2022 (aged 74)
- Position: Midfielder

Senior career*
Years	Team	Apps	(Gls)
1969–1970	TuS Bremerhaven 93		
1970–1972	Hannover 96	60	(13)
1972–1974	Borussia Dortmund	31	(17)
1974–1979	Hamburger SV	104	(25)
1979–1980	Houston Hurricane	23	(1)
1981–1983	Memphis Americans (indoor)	28	(24)

Managerial career
- 1981–1984: Memphis Americans
- 1993: Dallas Rockets
- * Club domestic league appearances and goals

Horst Bertl (24 March 1947 – 6 February 2022) was a German footballer who played as a midfielder.

== Playing career ==
In 1969, Bertl began his career with TuS Bremerhaven 93 before transferring to Bundesliga club Hannover 96 in 1970. Earning the nickname "Big Turtle", he went on to play two seasons with Hannover and moved to Borussia Dortmund where he also spent two seasons. In 1974, Bertl signed with Hamburger SV. He played five seasons with Hamburg before moving to the United States and signing with the Houston Hurricane of the North American Soccer League in 1979. The Hurricane folded after the 1980 season and Bertl spent two seasons with the Memphis Americans of the Major Indoor Soccer League.

== Managerial career ==
In 1981, the Memphis Americans of MISL signed Bertl as head coach. He compiled a 39–53 record over two seasons as a player-coach. In 1984, Bertl became a coach with the Comets Soccer Club in Dallas, Texas. In 2012, MLS's FC Dallas Youth acquired the Comets Soccer Club, adding Bertl to its program as well. In 1993, he coached the Dallas Rockets to the USISL playoffs.

Bertl served as player agent for Paul Caligiuri, Eric Eichmann, Braeden Cloutier and Brian McBride.

== Personal life and death ==
Bertl died on 6 February 2022, at the age of 74.

== Honours ==
Hamburger SV

- UEFA Cup Winners' Cup: 1976–77
- Bundesliga: 1978–79
- DFB-Pokal: 1975–76
