= Manfred Pohlschmidt =

German footballer

Manfred Pohlschmid
Personal information
- Date of birth: 27 August 1940 (age 86)
- Place of birth: Münster, Germany
- Height: 1.77 m (5 ft 10 in)
- Positions: Midfielder; forward

Senior career*
Years	Team	Apps	(Gls)
1961–1965	SC Preußen Münster	79	(38)
1965–1967	Hamburger SV	55	(20)
1965–1967	FC Schalke 04	106	(27)
- * Club domestic league appearances and goals

Manfred Pohlschmidt (born 27 August 1940) is a retired German football player.

== Career ==
Pohlschmidt started his Bundesliga career with SC Preußen Münster in the 1963–64 season, the club's only season in the Bundesliga. During his career he also played for Hamburger SV and FC Schalke 04 in the Bundesliga, and he played in the 1967 DFB-Pokal Final with HSV. In 1971, he retired from professional football.

== Personal ==
Pohlschmidt's brother, Bernhard, was also a footballer who played in the Bundesliga with SC Preußen Münster.
