= Karsten Bäron =

German footballer and coach

Personal information
- Date of birth: 24 April 1973 (age 53)
- Place of birth: West Berlin, West Germany
- Height: 1.97 m (6 ft 6 in)
- Position: Centre forward

Youth career
- 1979–1991: Hertha Zehlendorf

Senior career*
Years	Team	Apps	(Gls)
1991–1992	Hertha Zehlendorf	30	(28)
1992–1993	Hamburger SV II	6	(4)
1992–2000	Hamburger SV	124	(39)
Total		160	(71)

International career
1992–1996	Germany U-21	16	(3)

Managerial career
- 2003–2005: Hamburger SV (youth)
- 2006–2008: Hamburger SV II
- * Club domestic league appearances and goals

Karsten 'Air' Bäron (born 24 April 1973) is a German retired professional footballer who played as a centre forward. He later worked as a coach.

== Playing career ==
Bäron was born in Berlin. He arrived at Hamburger SV in 1992, at the age of 19, from modest Hertha Zehlendorf. He immediately had an impact for the first division club, ranking first in goals in the team (eight) for an eventual 11th-place finish; during his first season, he paired up front with diminutive Pole Jan Furtok, also being first summoned to the Germany U-21 squad.

In 1993–94, Bäron bettered his total to 13, one behind midfielder Thomas von Heesen in the squad, but Hamburg finished 12th. In the subsequent three seasons, he appeared irregularly, but still managed to contribute with 18 league goals combined.

From 1997 onwards, however, Bäron was hindered with serious knee problems, which forced him to undergo eight surgeries. He played in seven games in the 1999–2000 season as Hamburg finished in third position, but those would be his only in four years, as he eventually retired from football in June 2001, at only 28.

== Coaching career ==
In 2003, Bäron began coaching, still at his main team, starting with the youth sides. From 1 January 2006 to 19 December 2008, he coached the reserves in Regionalliga Nord.
