= Roy Präger =

German footballer

Personal information
- Date of birth: 22 September 1971 (age 55)
- Place of birth: Zossen, East Germany
- Height: 1.72 m (5 ft 8 in)
- Position: Forward

Youth career
- BSG Motor Sperenberg
- SG Kummersdorf/Fernneuendorf

Senior career*
Years	Team	Apps	(Gls)
1991–1992	Stahl Brandenburg	32	(3)
1992–1995	SC Fortuna Köln	104	(15)
1995–1999	VfL Wolfsburg	125	(33)
1999–2002	Hamburger SV	83	(18)
2002–2005	VfL Wolfsburg	28	(2)
2004–2005	VfL Wolfsburg II	24	(3)
2007–2010	TSV Hehlingen		
Total		396	(74)

International career
1999	Germany B	1	(0)
- * Club domestic league appearances and goals

Roy Präger (born 22 September 1971) is a German former football player.
