= Franz-Josef Hönig =

German footballer

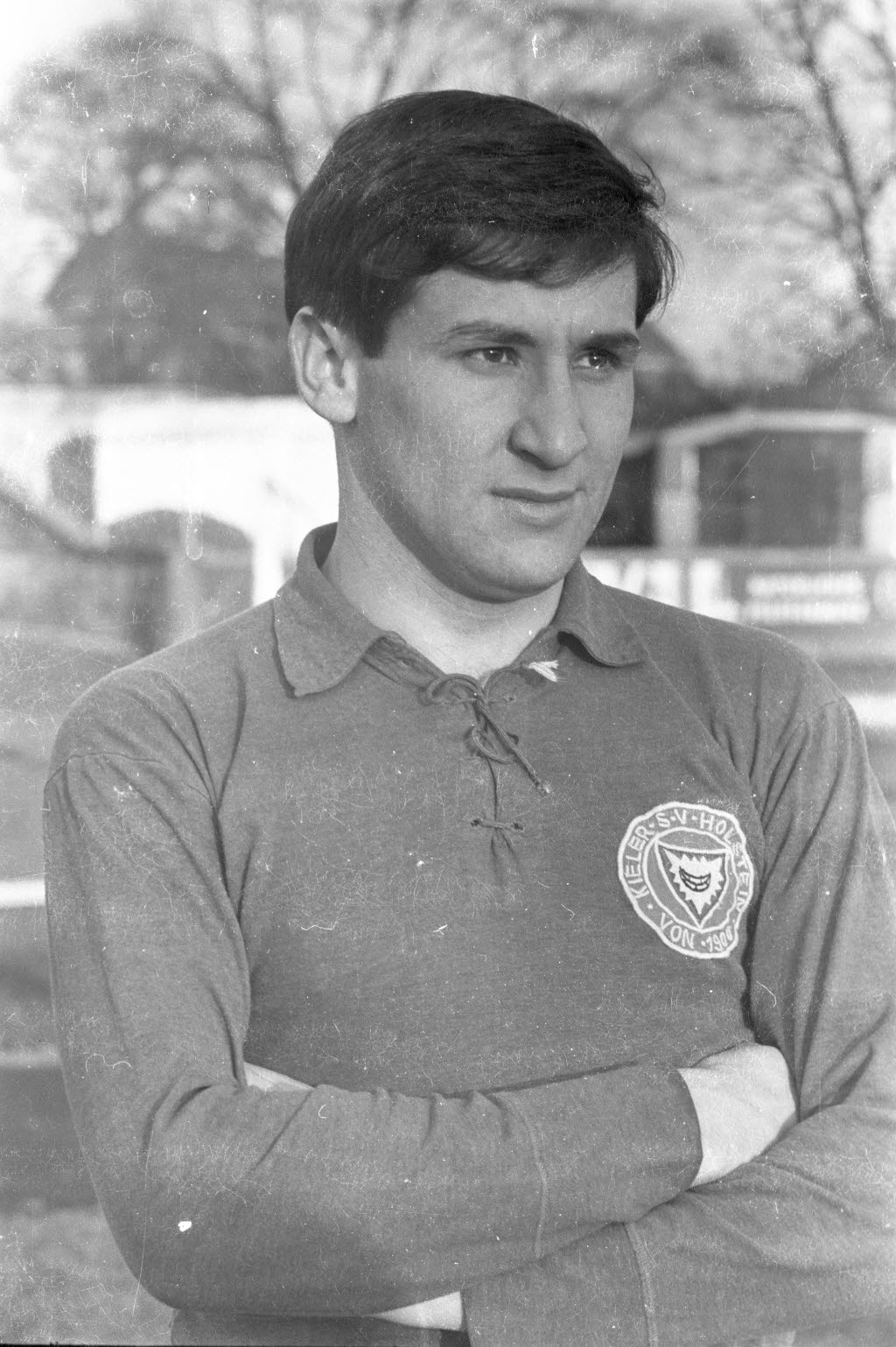
- Hönig in 1965

Personal information
- Date of birth: 10 July 1942 (age 84)
- Place of birth: Rheingau, Germany
- Height: 1.80 m (5 ft 11 in)
- Positions: Midfielder; forward

Senior career*
Years	Team	Apps	(Gls)
- FV 08 Geisenheim
1964–1967	Holstein Kiel		
1967–1974	Hamburger SV	205	(62)
1974–1978	SV Wiesbaden		
1978	Cork Celtic	1	(0)
Total		206	(62)
- * Club domestic league appearances and goals

Franz-Josef Hönig (born 10 July 1942) is a German former professional footballer who played as a midfielder or forward. He spent seven seasons in the Bundesliga with Hamburger SV.

== Honours ==
Hamburger SV

- UEFA Cup Winners' Cup finalist: 1967–68
- DFB-Pokal finalist: 1973–74
