= Edmund Adamkiewicz =

German footballer (1920–1991)

Personal information
- Date of birth: 21 April 1920
- Place of birth: Hamburg, Germany
- Date of death: 4 April 1991 (aged 70)
- Position: Forward

Senior career*
Years	Team	Apps	(Gls)
1936–1939	Viktoria Wilhelmsburg		
1939–1943	Hamburger SV		
1943–1944	Altona 93		
1944	HSV Groß-Born		
1945–1946	Hamburger SV	6	(0)
1946–1947	Eintracht Frankfurt		
1947–1951	Hamburger SV	10	(7)
1951–1952	VfB Mühlburg		
1952–1953	Karlsruher SC		
1953–1955	Harburger TB	50	(3)

International career
1942	Germany	2	(1)
- * Club domestic league appearances and goals

Edmund "Adam" Adamkiewicz (21 April 1920 – 4 April 1991) was a German footballer.

Born in Hamburg, Adamkiewicz's career began in Wilhelmsburg, where he played for Viktoria Wilhelmsburg, and led him to various clubs, his first spell with Hamburger SV starting in early 1940. Both of his international appearances were during World War II. On 22 November 1942, Adamkiewicz scored his only international goal.

After the war finished, Adamkiewicz played for Eintracht Frankfurt, a total of 21 games, during the 1946–47 season. At Frankfurt am Main, Toni Turek, who went on to become world champion in 1954 and also a “football god,” as well as Adolf Bechtold were among his teammates.

In 1947 he returned to Hamburg where he became top-scorer for two non-consecutive seasons, before moving on in 1951. He was with VfB Mühlburg/Karlsruher SC for a time before returning to Hamburg once again where he joined Harburger TB.

After the end of his active career, Adamkiewicz worked as a haulage contractor. He made headlines in the spring of 1956 when he was hit by a barrel while loading his vehicle and suffered a forearm fracture and bone splinters in his upper arm.
