= Jörg Bode (footballer) =

German footballer and coach

Personal information
- Date of birth: 22 August 1969 (age 57)
- Place of birth: Melle, West Germany
- Height: 1.73 m (5 ft 8 in)
- Position: Midfielder

Youth career
- TuRa Melle
- VfL Osnabrück

Senior career*
Years	Team	Apps	(Gls)
1988–1989	Arminia Bielefeld	22	(2)
1989–1991	Hamburger SV (A)	23	(1)
1989–1994	Hamburger SV	82	(3)
1994–2002	Arminia Bielefeld	211	(11)
2002–2004	FC Augsburg	68	(3)
2004–2005	TSV Bobingen		
2005–2007	SC Verl	58	(5)

International career
1991	Germany U-21	1	(0)
1990–1992	Germany Olympic	2	(0)

Managerial career
- 2007–2008: Delbrücker SC
- * Club domestic league appearances and goals

Jörg Bode (born 22 August 1969 in Melle, West Germany) is a German football coach and a former player.
