= Armin Eck =

German footballer and manager

Personal information
- Date of birth: 8 December 1964 (age 61)
- Place of birth: Kulmbach, West Germany
- Height: 1.73 m (5 ft 8 in)
- Position: Midfielder

Youth career
- –1978: TSV 08 Kulmbach
- 1978–1982: SpVgg Bayreuth

Senior career*
Years	Team	Apps	(Gls)
1982–1987	SpVgg Bayreuth	156	(46)
1987–1989	Bayern Munich	39	(2)
1989–1994	Hamburger SV	129	(19)
1994–1999	Arminia Bielefeld	45	(15)
1997–1998	→ Hessen Kassel (loan)	21	(7)
1998–1999	SC Weismain	18	(3)
1999–2000	SpVgg Bayreuth		

Managerial career
- 1999–2003: SpVgg Bayreuth
- 2003–2006: SV Friesen
- 2006–2007: Bayern Hof
- 2009–2014: BSC Bayreuth-Saas
- 2014–2015: ATS Kulmbach
- * Club domestic league appearances and goals

Armin Eck (born 8 December 1964) is a German football coach and a former player.

== Honours ==
- Bundesliga: 1988–89; runner-up: 1987–88
