= Harald Spörl =

German footballer

Personal information
- Date of birth: October 31, 1966 (age 60)
- Place of birth: Bamberg, Germany
- Height: 1.70 m (5 ft 7 in)
- Position: Midfielder

Team information
- Current team: Hamburger SV (scout)

Youth career
- TSV Eintracht Bamberg

Senior career*
Years	Team	Apps	(Gls)
1985–1986	1. FC Bamberg		
1986–1987	VfL Frohnlach		
1987–2000	Hamburger SV	321	(60)
2001–2002	LR Ahlen	12	(3)
- * Club domestic league appearances and goals

Harald Spörl (born October 31, 1966) is a German former football midfielder. He currently works for Hamburger SV as a scout. From July 1987 to December 2000, Spörl played for Hamburger SV, before joining LR Ahlen until June 2002.

== Honours ==
- Bundesliga third place: 2000
