= Jan Furtok =

Polish footballer (1962–2024)

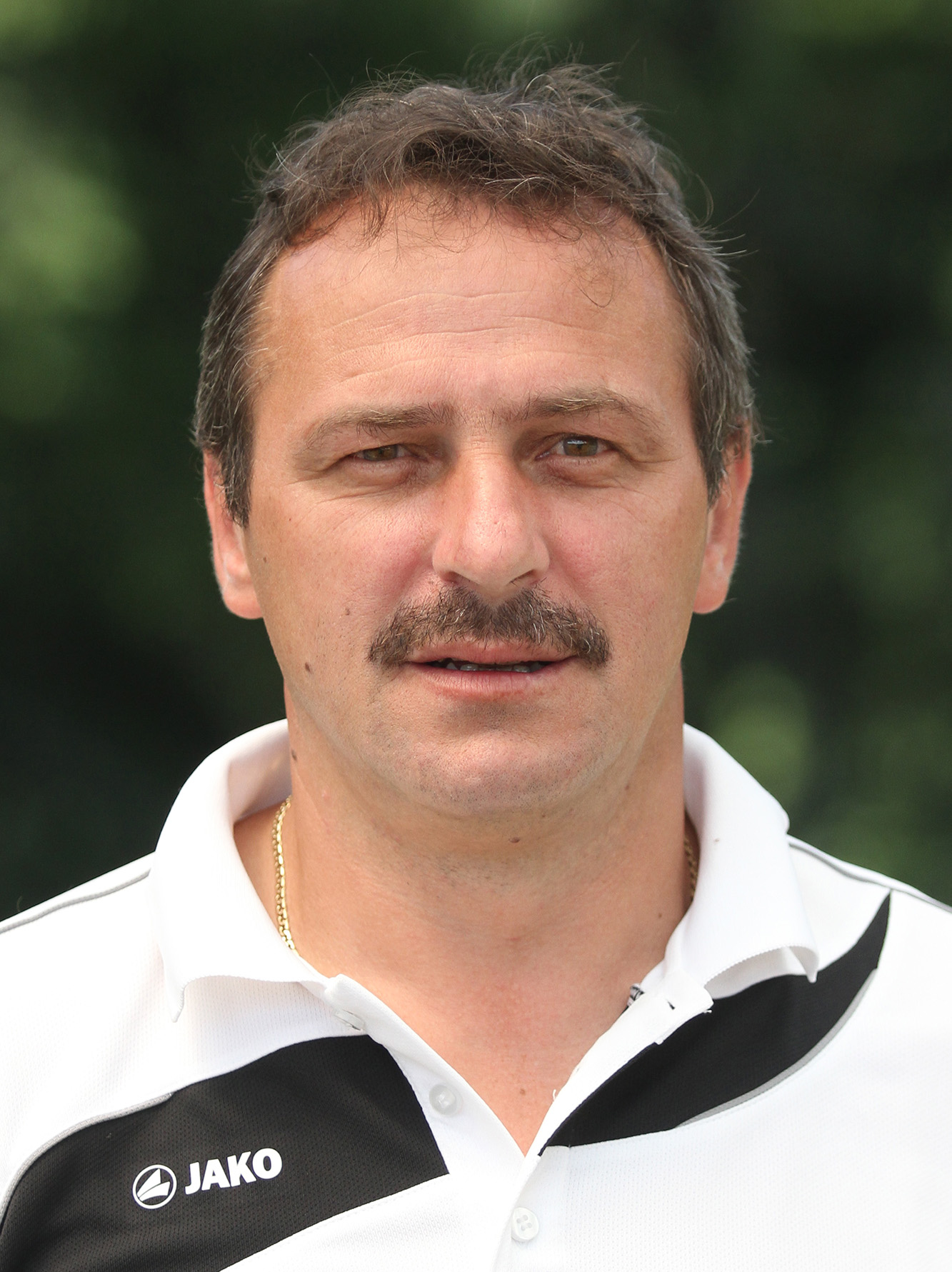
- Furtok in 2010

Personal information
- Date of birth: 9 March 1962
- Place of birth: Katowice, Poland
- Date of death: 26 November 2024 (aged 62)
- Place of death: Katowice, Poland
- Height: 1.74 m (5 ft 9 in)
- Position: Striker

Youth career
- 1976–1977: MK Górnik Katowice
- 1977–1978: GKS Katowice

Senior career*
Years	Team	Apps	(Gls)
1979–1988	GKS Katowice	169	(77)
1988–1993	Hamburger SV	135	(51)
1993–1995	Eintracht Frankfurt	53	(9)
1995–1998	GKS Katowice	40	(8)
Total		397	(145)

International career
1984–1993	Poland	36	(10)

Managerial career
- 2005: GKS Katowice
- * Club domestic league appearances and goals

Jan Furtok (9 March 1962 – 26 November 2024) was a Polish professional footballer who played as a striker. Regarded as the greatest player in GKS Katowice's history, he is the club's all-time best goalscorer.

== Career ==
Born in Katowice, Furtok spent the early and latter parts of his career playing for his hometown club GKS Katowice, with a seven-year stint in (West) German clubs Hamburger SV and Eintracht Frankfurt in-between.

With GKS, he won the 1985–86 Polish Cup, the club's first major domestic achievement. He then led the Silesian side to third-place and second-place finishes in the 1986–87 and 1987–88 league campaigns, accordingly. With 122 goals in 299 appearances across all competitions, he is the best goalscorer in GKS Katowice's history. GKS retired the number 9 in honour of Furtok's service to the club.

Furtok played for the Poland national team, scoring 10 goals across 36 appearances. He was a participant at the 1986 FIFA World Cup. His goal scored by hand rescued Poland from humiliating goalless home draw against San Marino in 1994 FIFA World Cup qualification.

== Death ==
Furtok had been suffering from Alzheimer's for years. He was diagnosed in 2015. Furtok died on 26 November 2024, at the age of 62. Posthumously, the President of Poland, Andrzej Duda, awarded him the Officer's Cross of the Order of Polonia Restituta. His funeral took place on 29 November 2024 at the cemetery of the Holy Trinity Parish in Katowice. The ceremony was attended by prominent figures, including Jan Urban, Jerzy Brzęczek, Lukas Podolski, and representatives from GKS Katowice and Górnik Zabrze.

== Commemoration ==
On 29 November 2024, the Polish Football Association announced that all matches of the I, II, and III leagues played between 29 November and 2 December would be preceded by a minute of silence in memory of Furtok. A similar announcement was made by the Ekstraklasa. However, the minute of silence for Furtok was not observed by Ruch Chorzów before their match against Odra Opole, which sparked controversy and various reactions from fans and the public.

In May 2025, he was inducted into the Ekstraklasa Hall of Fame.

On 11 September 2026, the Katowice city council voted to change GKS' new stadium's official name to Stadion Miejski im. Jana Furtoka, the Jan Furtok Municipal Stadium.

== Career statistics ==
Appearances and goals by national team and year
National team	Year	Apps	Goals
Poland	1984	1	0
Poland	1985	3	1
Poland	1986	3	0
Poland	1987	4	2
Poland	1988	6	3
Poland	1989	5	2
Poland	1990	3	0
Poland	1991	6	1
Poland	1992	0	0
Poland	1993	5	1
Total		36	10

Scores and results list Poland's goal tally first, score column indicates score after each Furtok goal.

List of international goals scored by Jan Furtok
No.	Date	Venue	Opponent	Score	Result	Competition
1	11 December 1985	Altay Alsancak Stadium, İzmir, Turkey	Turkey	1–0	1–1	Friendly
2	18 March 1987	Municipal Stadium, Rybnik, Poland	Finland	3–1	3–1	Friendly
3	24 March 1987	Olympic Stadium, Wrocław, Poland	Norway	1–0	4–1	Friendly
4	24 August 1988	Municipal Stadium, Białystok, Poland	Bulgaria	2–0	3–2	Friendly
5	21 September 1988	Stadion der Freundschaft, Cottbus, East Germany	East Germany	1–1	2–1	Friendly
6	21 September 1988	Stadion der Freundschaft, Cottbus, East Germany	East Germany	2–1	2–1	Friendly
7	2 May 1989	Ullevaal Stadion, Oslo, Norway	Norway	1–0	3–0	Friendly
8	2 May 1989	Ullevaal Stadion, Oslo, Norway	Norway	2–0	3–0	Friendly
9	16 October 1991	Municipal Stadium, Poznań, Poland	Republic of Ireland	2–3	3–3	UEFA Euro 1992 qualifying
10	28 April 1993	Widzew Stadium, Łódź, Poland	San Marino	1–0	1–0	1994 FIFA World Cup qualification

== Honours ==
GKS Katowice

- Polish Cup: 1985–86

Individual

- Polish Newcomer of the Year: 1984

Individual

- Ekstraklasa Hall of Fame: 2025
