= 2006–07 Hamburger SV season =

Hamburger SV
2006-07 season
- Chairman: Bernd Hoffmann
- Manager: Thomas Doll (until 1 February); Huub Stevens (from 2 February)
- Bundesliga: 7th
- DFB-Pokal: First round
- Champions League: Group stage
- Top goalscorer: League: Rafael van der Vaart (8); All: Rafael van der Vaart (11)
Home colours	Away colours	Third colours

The 2006–07 season was Hamburger SV's 44th professional season.

== Season summary ==
Hamburg were rooted to the bottom of the table for the first half of the season, but the appointment of Huub Stevens revitalised the team and they rose to a final 7th-placed finish.

== Players ==
=== First-team squad ===
Squad at end of season

Note: Flags indicate national team as defined under FIFA eligibility rules; some limited exceptions apply. Players may hold more than one non-FIFA nationality.

No.	Pos.	Nation	Player
1	GK	GER	Stefan Wächter
2	DF	ARG	Juan Pablo Sorín
3	DF	CMR	Thimothée Atouba
4	DF	GER	Bastian Reinhardt
5	DF	NED	Joris Mathijsen
6	MF	SUI	Raphaël Wicky
7	MF	IRI	Mehdi Mahdavikia
8	DF	GER	Mathias Abel (on loan from Schalke 04)
9	FW	PER	Paolo Guerrero
10	DF	BEL	Vincent Kompany
11	FW	CRO	Ivica Olić
12	GK	GER	Sascha Kirschstein
13	MF	GER	Mario Fillinger
14	MF	CZE	David Jarolím
15	MF	GER	Piotr Trochowski (Note: Trochowski was born in Tczew, Poland, but was raised in Germany from the age of 5 and represented Germany at U-18, U-20, and U-21 level before making his international debut for Germany in October 2006.)
16	DF	GER	René Klingbeil
17	FW	CIV	Boubacar Sanogo

No.	Pos.	Nation	Player
18	FW	GER	Oliver Hampel
20	FW	CIV	Guy Demel (Note: Demel was born in Orsay, France, but acquired an Ivory Coast passport in 2004 and made his international debut for the Ivory Coast in 2004.)
22	FW	ALB	Besart Berisha (Note: Berisha was born in Pristina, Yugoslavia (now Kosovo, but part of Serbia during the 2006–07 season), but also qualified to represent Albania internationally and made his international debut for Albania in October 2006. After Kosovo was recognised by UEFA and FIFA in 2016, Berisha changed his international allegiance to Kosovo and would make his international debut for Kosovo in March 2017.)
23	MF	NED	Rafael van der Vaart
24	DF	GER	Sasan Gouhari
25	FW	GER	Massimo Cannizzaro
26	DF	GER	Volker Schmidt
27	MF	GER	Alexander Laas
28	MF	NED	Nigel de Jong
29	GK	GER	Wolfgang Hesl
30	MF	NAM	Collin Benjamin
32	MF	GER	Änis Ben-Hatira (Note: Ben-Hatira was born in West Berlin, West Germany (now Germany), and represented Germany at U-18, U-20, and U-21 level, but also qualified to represent Tunisia internationally and would make his international debut for Tunisia in February 2012.)
33	MF	USA	Benny Feilhaber (Note: Feilhaber was born in Rio de Janeiro, Brazil, but was raised in the United States from the age of 6 and represented the United States at U-20 and U-23 level before making his international debut for the United States in March 2007.)
34	MF	GER	Sidney Sam
35	GK	GER	Frank Rost
37	FW	GER	Rouwen Hennings
38	FW	SRB	Danijel Ljuboja (Note: Ljuboja was born in Vinkovci, Yugoslavia (now Croatia), but also qualified to represent Serbia and Montenegro and its successor state Serbia internationally and made his international debut for Serbia and Montenegro in 2003.) (on loan from VfB Stuttgart)

=== Left club during season ===
Note: Flags indicate national team as defined under FIFA eligibility rules; some limited exceptions apply. Players may hold more than one non-FIFA nationality.

No.	Pos.	Nation	Player
8	MF	GER	Markus Karl (to Greuther Fürth)
11	FW	GER	Benjamin Lauth (on loan to VfB Stuttgart)

No.	Pos.	Nation	Player
21	DF	NED	Khalid Boulahrouz (to Chelsea)

== Competitions ==
=== Bundesliga ===
==== League table ====
Pos	Team	Pld	W	D	L	GF	GA	GD	Pts	Qualification or relegation
5	Bayer Leverkusen	34	15	6	13	54	49	+5	51	Qualification to UEFA Cup first round (Note: Since 1. FC Nürnberg won the 2006–07 DFB-Pokal, thus qualifying for the UEFA Cup first round, Hamburger SV entered the Intertoto Cup third round.)
6	1. FC Nürnberg	34	11	15	8	43	32	+11	48	Qualification to UEFA Cup first round
7	Hamburger SV	34	10	15	9	43	37	+6	45	Qualification to Intertoto Cup third round
8	VfL Bochum	34	13	6	15	49	50	−1	45	
9	Borussia Dortmund	34	12	8	14	41	43	−2	44	

Source: kicker.de
Rules for classification: 1) Points; 2) Goal difference; 3) Goals scored

==== Matches ====
12 August 2006 1	Hamburger SV	1–1	Arminia Bielefeld	Hamburg
15:30 CET	Jarolím (yellow card) 47'; Van der Vaart (yellow card) 70'; Kompany (yellow card) 51'; Sanogo 67'	Report	Eigler 32'; Schuler (yellow card) 78'	Stadium: AOL Arena; Attendance: 52,116; Referee: Helmut Fleischer

19 August 2006 2	Energie Cottbus	2–2	Hamburger SV	Cottbus
15:30 CET	Rost (yellow card) 52'; Munteanu 56' (pen.); Radu 69'	Report	Sanogo 39', (yellow card) 51'; Jarolím (yellow card) 40'; Ziebig 72' (o.g.); Demel (red card) 81'	Stadium: Stadion der Freundschaft; Attendance: 21,000; Referee: Günther Perl

27 August 2006 3	Hamburger SV	1–1	Hertha BSC	Hamburg
17:00 CET	Sanogo 18'; Jarolím (yellow card) 15'; Wicky (yellow card) 60'; De Jong (yellow card) 76'; Benjamin (red card) 89'	Report	Chahed (yellow card) 7' (yellow-red card) 86'; Boateng (yellow card) 56'; Giménez 64'; Pantelić (yellow card) 88'	Stadium: AOL Arena; Attendance: 53,989; Referee: Herbert Fandel

16 September 2006 4	Borussia Dortmund	1–0	Hamburger SV	Dortmund
15:30 CET	Degen (yellow card) 63'; Wörns 82'; Tinga (yellow card) 88'	Report	Guerrero (yellow card) 87'	Stadium: Westfalenstadion; Attendance: 80,708; Referee: Lutz Wagner

23 September 2006 5	Hamburger SV	1–1	Werder Bremen	Hamburg
15:30 CET	De Jong (yellow card) 42'; Reinhardt 69'; Mahdavikia (red card) 74'; Mathijsen (yellow card) 89'	Report	Womé (yellow card) 20'; Borowski 58'; Baumann (yellow card) 69'; Fritz (yellow card) 85'	Stadium: AOL Arena; Attendance: 57,000; Referee: Wolfgang Stark

30 September 2006 6	Eintracht Frankfurt	2–2	Hamburger SV	Frankfurt
15:30 CET	Meier 36'; Amanatidis 58'	Report	Jarolím (yellow card) 16'; Ljuboja 51'; Mathjisen (yellow card) 67'; Sanogo 69', (yellow card) 90'	Stadium: Commerzbank-Arena; Attendance: 51,500; Referee: Helmut Fleischer

14 October 2006 7	Hamburger SV	1–2	Schalke 04	Hamburg
15:30 CET	De Jong (yellow card) 21'; Trochowski 30'; Jarolím (yellow card) 40' (yellow-red card) 43'; Sorín (yellow card) 67'	Report	H. Altıntop 16'; Bordon 53'; Kobiashvili (yellow card) 73'; Rafinha (yellow card) 80'	Stadium: AOL Arena; Attendance: 57,000; Referee: Felix Brych

22 October 2006 8	Bayer Leverkusen	1–2	Hamburger SV	Leverkusen
17:00 CET	Voronin 40'; Barbarez (yellow card) 57'	Report	Van der Vaart (yellow card) 60'; Guerrero 70', 86'	Stadium: BayArena; Attendance: 22,500; Referee: Jochen Drees

28 October 2006 9	Hamburger SV	0–0	Hannover 96	Hamburg
15:30 CET	Guerrero (yellow card) 38'	Report		Stadium: AOL Arena; Attendance: 57,000; Referee: Knut Kirchner

4 November 2006 10	VfL Wolfsburg	1–0	Hamburger SV	Wolfsburg
15:30 CET	Sarpei (yellow card) 14'; Hanke 19'; Quiroga (yellow card) 61'	Report	Van der Vaart (yellow card) 58'	Stadium: Volkswagen Arena; Attendance: 25,623; Referee: Markus Merk

7 November 2006 11	VfB Stuttgart	2–0	Hamburger SV	Stuttgart
20:00 CET	Osorio (yellow card) 27'; Gómez 80'; Hitzlsperger 85'	Report	Mahdavikia (yellow card) 22'; Fillinger (yellow card) 28'	Stadium: Gottlieb-Daimler-Stadion; Attendance: 37,000; Referee: Herbert Fandel

11 November 2006 12	Hamburger SV	1–1	Borussia Mönchengladbach	Hamburg
15:30 CET	Sanogo (yellow card) 50'; Ljuboja 55'	Report	Compper (yellow card) 43'; Degen (yellow card) 77'; Neuville 84'	Stadium: AOL Arena; Attendance: 56,587; Referee: Florian Meyer

18 November 2006 13	Mainz 05	0–0	Hamburger SV	Mainz
15:30 CET	Peković (yellow card) 52'; Azaouagh (yellow card) 87'	Report	Klingbeil (yellow card) 5'; Jarolím (yellow card) 62'; Trochowski (yellow card) 65'	Stadium: Bruchwegstadion; Attendance: 20,300; Referee: Helmut Fleischer

25 November 2006 14	Hamburger SV	1–2	Bayern Munich	Hamburg
15:30 CET	Van der Vaart 18' (pen.); Wicky (yellow card) 66'; Atouba (yellow card) 80'; Guerrero (yellow card) 81'	Report	Demichelis (yellow card) 17'; Kahn (yellow card) 19'; Sagnol (yellow card) 23'; Makaay 56'; Lahm (yellow card) 59'; Pizarro 78'	Stadium: AOL Arena; Attendance: 57,000; Referee: Thorsten Kinhöfer

2 December 2006 15	VfL Bochum	2–1	Hamburger SV	Bochum
15:30 CET	Dabrowski 5'; Bönig (yellow card) 22'; Lense (yellow card) 61'; Misimović 70', (yellow card) 80'	Report	Guerrero (yellow card) 34'; Ljuboja 42'; Trochowski (yellow card) 61'; Reinhardt (yellow card) 69'; Jarolím (yellow card) 72'; Van der Vaart (red card) 80'	Stadium: rewirpowerSTADION; Attendance: 25,715; Referee: Wolfgang Stark

9 December 2006 16	Hamburger SV	0–0	1. FC Nürnberg	Hamburg
15:30 CET	Schmidt (yellow card) 77'	Report	Saenko (yellow card) 79'; Banović (yellow card) 90'	Stadium: AOL Arena; Attendance: 54,628; Referee: Herbert Fandel

16 December 2006 17	Alemannia Aachen	3–3	Hamburger SV	Aachen
15:30 CET	Kiltzpera (yellow card) 40'; Leiwakabessy (yellow card) 55'; Reghecampf 63' (pen.); Ibišević (yellow card) 66'; Fiél 78'; Reinhardt 90' (o.g.)	Report	Laas (yellow card) 29'; Berisha 32'; Benjamin 67'; Jarolím (yellow card) 74'; Ljuboja 76'	Stadium: Old Tivoli; Attendance: 20,800; Referee: Manuel Gräfe

27 January 2007 18	Arminia Bielefeld	1–1	Hamburger SV	Bielefeld
15:30 CET	Ahanfouf (yellow card) 60'; Marx (yellow card) 68'; Borges (yellow card) 75', (goal) 89'; Kauf (yellow card) 82'	Report	Ljuboja 10'; Demel (yellow card) 43'; Laas (yellow card) 62'	Stadium: Schüco Arena; Attendance: 26,601; Referee: Michael Weiner

31 January 2007 19	Hamburger SV	1–1	Energie Cottbus	Hamburg
20:00 CET	Sorín 4', (yellow card) 45'; De Jong (yellow card) 31'	Report	Radu 7'; Munteanu (yellow card) 57'	Stadium: AOL Arena; Attendance: 52,484; Referee: Peter Sippel

3 February 2007 20	Hertha BSC	2–1	Hamburger SV	Berlin
15:30 CET	Friedrich (yellow card) 21', (goal) 78'; Van Burik (yellow card) 23'; Gilberto (yellow card) 84'; Mineiro 90+2'	Report	De Jong (yellow card) 8'; Jarolím (yellow card) 25'; Sanogo (yellow card) 30'; Laas 33'	Stadium: Olympiastadion; Attendance: 47,354; Referee: Thorsten Kinhöfer

10 February 2007 21	Hamburger SV	3–0	Borussia Dortmund	Hamburg
15:30 CET	Van der Vaart 11' (pen.), 87'; Benjamin 40'; Mahdavikia 90'	Report	Tinga (yellow card) 23'; Dedé (red card) 42'	Stadium: AOL Arena; Attendance: 57,000; Referee: Lutz Wagner

17 February 2007 22	Werder Bremen	0–2	Hamburger SV	Bremen
15:30 CET	Jensen (yellow card) 49'; Diego (yellow card) 69'; Mertesacker (yellow card) 90+3'	Report	Laas (yellow card) 21'; Van der Vaart 42' (pen.), 87'; Mahdavikia (yellow card) 69'; Jarolím (yellow card) 77'	Stadium: Weserstadion; Attendance: 42,100; Referee: Knut Kircher

24 February 2007 23	Hamburger SV	3–1	Eintracht Frankfurt	Hamburg
15:30 CET	Van der Vaart 7'; Trochowski 77'; Olić 90+3'	Report	Ochs (yellow card) 56'; Takahara 59'; Thurk (yellow card) 70'; Fink (yellow card) 85'	Stadium: AOL Arena; Attendance: 57,000; Referee: Günther Perl

2 March 2007 24	Schalke 04	0–2	Hamburger SV	Gelsenkirchen
20:30 CET	Rafinha (yellow card) 48'; Rodríguez (yellow card) 56'; Ernst (yellow card) 85'	Report	Jarolím (yellow card) 14'; Van der Vaart 71'; Olić (yellow card) 72', (goal) 80'; Reinhardt (yellow card) 73'	Stadium: Veltins-Arena; Attendance: 61,482; Referee: Wolfgang Stark

11 March 2007 25	Hamburger SV	0–0	Bayer Leverkusen	Hamburg
17:00 CET		Report	Schneider (yellow card) 71'; Castro (yellow card) 85'	Stadium: AOL Arena; Attendance: 55,337; Referee: Herbert Fandel

17 March 2007 26	Hannover 96	0–0	Hamburger SV	Hanover
15:30 CET	Lala (yellow card) 43'	Report	Wicky (yellow card) 30'; Atouba (yellow card) 54'; Jarolím (yellow card) 66'; Benjamin (yellow card) 75'; De Jong (yellow card) 85'	Stadium: AWD-Arena; Attendance: 49,000; Referee: Peter Sippel

1 April 2007 27	Hamburger SV	1–0	VfL Wolfsburg	Hamburg
17:00 CET	Mahdavikia 60', (yellow card) 69'; Jarolím (yellow card) 87'	Report	Madlung (yellow card) 63'; Hofland (yellow card) 67'; Van der Leegte (yellow card) 89'	Stadium: AOL Arena; Attendance: 57,000; Referee: Günther Perl

7 April 2007 28	Hamburger SV	2–4	VfB Stuttgart	Hamburg
15:30 CET	Van der Vaart (yellow card) 20'; Ben-Hatira (red card) 34'; Jarolím 66'; Olić 75'	Report	Cacau 10'; Khedira 13'; Hilbert 27'; Magnin (yellow card) 40'; Hitzlsperger (red card) 43'; Meira 51'	Stadium: AOL Arena; Attendance: 57,000; Referee: Lutz Wagner

13 April 2007 29	Borussia Mönchengladbach	0–1	Hamburger SV	Mönchengladbach
20:30 CET	Rafael (yellow card) 58'	Report	Guerrero 90'	Stadium: Borussia-Park; Attendance: 53,500; Referee: Markus Merk

22 April 2007 30	Hamburger SV	2–2	Mainz 05	Hamburg
17:00 CET	Sorín 23' (pen.); Benjamin (yellow card) 75'; Guerrero 83'; Mahdavikia (yellow card) 86'	Report	Zidan 12'; Vrančić (yellow card) 35'; Gerber 59'; Andreasen (yellow card) 86'	Stadium: AOL Arena; Attendance: 57,000; Referee: Herbert Fandel

28 April 2007 31	Bayern Munich	1–2	Hamburger SV	Munich
15:30 CET	Van Bommel (yellow card) 15'; Pizarro 35'; Salihamidžić (yellow card) 76'	Report	Atouba (yellow card) 40' (yellow-red card) 90'; Van der Vaart 71'; Guerrero 76'	Stadium: Allianz Arena; Attendance: 69,000; Referee: Thorsten Kinhöfer

5 May 2007 32	Hamburger SV	0–3	VfL Bochum	Hamburg
15:30 CET	Mathijsen (yellow card) 68'; Benjamin (yellow card) 79'	Report	Zdebel (yellow card) 59'; Gekas 61'; Grote 66'; Misimović 80' (pen.)	Stadium: AOL Arena; Attendance: 57,000; Referee: Felix Brych

12 May 2007 33	1. FC Nürnberg	0–2	Hamburger SV	Nuremberg
15:30 CET		Report	Demel (yellow card) 22'; Sorín (yellow card) 24'; Van der Vaart 39'; Jarolím 41'; Atouba (yellow card) 58'	Stadium: Easy-Credit-Stadion; Attendance: 47,000; Referee: Knut Kircher

19 May 2007 34	Hamburger SV	4–0	Alemannia Aachen	Hamburg
15:30 CET	Olić 15', 27'; Sorín 54', 87'; Jarolím (yellow card) 66'	Report	Rösler (yellow card) 26'; Herzig (yellow card) 55'; Stehle (yellow card) 78'	Stadium: AOL Arena; Attendance: 57,000; Referee: Marc Seemann

=== DFB Cup ===
9 September 2006 1	Stuttgarter Kickers	4–3 (a.e.t.)	Hamburger SV	Stuttgart
15:30 CEST (UTC+02:00)	Yıldız 5', 89'; Christian Okpala 35', 96' (pen.); Jens Härter (yellow card)	Report	Sanogo 28'; Ljuboja 36'; Demel 44'; Reinhardt (yellow card); Klingbeil (yellow card); Demel (yellow card)	Stadium: Gazi-Stadion auf der Waldau; Attendance: 10,450; Referee: Peter Sippel

=== UEFA Champions League ===
==== Qualifying round ====
9 August 2006 Third qualifying round First leg	Hamburger SV	0–0	Osasuna	Hamburg
20:30 CEST (UTC+02:00)	Trochowski (yellow card) 21'	Report	García (yellow card) 35'; Josetxo (yellow card) 36'; Delporte (yellow card) 63'; López (yellow card) 89'	Stadium: AOL-Arena; Attendance: 47,458; Referee: Tom Henning Øvrebø

22 August 2006 Third qualifying round Second leg	Osasuna	1–1 (1–1a agg.)	Hamburger SV	Pamplona, Spain
20:45 CEST (UTC+02:00)	Cuéllar 6'; Puñal (yellow card) 62'	Report	Demel (yellow card) 66'; De Jong 74'; Mahdavikia (yellow card) 80'; Kirschstein (yellow card) 84'	Stadium: Estadio Reyno de Navarra; Attendance: 18,876; Referee: Massimo Busacca

==== Group stage ====
Team	Pld	W	D	L	GF	GA	GD	Pts
(England) Arsenal	6	3	2	1	7	3	+4	11
(Portugal) Porto	6	3	2	1	9	4	+5	11
(Russia) CSKA Moscow	6	2	2	2	4	5	−1	8
(Germany) Hamburger SV	6	1	0	5	7	15	−8	3

13 September 2006 Group stage	Hamburger SV	1–2	Arsenal	Hamburg
20:45 CEST (UTC+02:00)	Kirschstein (red card) 10'; Sanogo 90+2'	Report	Gilberto 12'; Rosický 53'	Stadium: AOL-Arena; Attendance: 50,389; Referee: Peter Fröjdfeldt

26 September 2006 Group stage	CSKA Moscow	1–0	Hamburger SV	Moscow, Russia
CEST (UTC+02:00)	Dudu 59'; Vágner Love (yellow card) 61'	Report	Sorín (yellow card) 33'; Mathijsen (yellow card) 54'; Lauth (red card) 86'; Jarolím (yellow card) 88'	Stadium: Lokomotiv Stadium; Attendance: 23,000; Referee: Jan Wegereef

17 October 2006 Group stage	Porto	4–1	Hamburger SV	Porto, Portugal
20:45 CEST (UTC+02:00)	López 14', 81'; Quaresma (yellow card) 22'; Fucile (yellow card) 30'; González 45' (pen.); Postiga 69'	Report	Ljuboja (yellow card) 26'; Mahdavikia (yellow card) 31'; De Jong (yellow card) 86'; Trochowski 89'	Stadium: Estádio do Dragão; Attendance: 31,109; Referee: Alain Hamer

1 November 2006 Group stage	Hamburger SV	1–3	Porto	Hamburg
20:45 CET (UTC+01:00)	Van der Vaart (yellow card) 60' (goal) 63'	Report	González 44'; López 61'; Meireles (yellow card) 64'; Moraes (yellow card) 77', (goal) 88'	Stadium: AOL-Arena; Attendance: 51,000; Referee: Laurent Duhamel

21 November 2006 Group stage	Arsenal	3–1	Hamburger SV	London, England
20:45 CET (UTC+01:00)	Senderos (yellow card) 20'; Hleb (yellow card) 41'; Van Persie 52'; Henry (yellow card) 53'; Clichy (yellow card) 56'; Eboué 83'; Baptista 88'	Report	Van der Vaart 4', (yellow card) 32'; Benjamin (yellow card) 27'; Sanogo (yellow card) 48'; Fillinger (yellow card) 90'	Stadium: Emirates Stadium; Attendance: 59,962; Referee: Claus Bo Larsen

6 December 2006 Group stage	Hamburger SV	3–2	CSKA Moscow	Hamburg
20:45 CET (UTC+01:00)	Berisha 28'; Atouba (yellow card) 49' (yellow-red card) 69'; Van der Vaart 84'; Sanogo 90'	Report	Olić 23' (pen.); Dudu (yellow card) 31'; Zhirkov 65'; Berezutski (yellow card) 82'	Stadium: AOL-Arena; Attendance: 49,649; Referee: Stefano Farina

== Transfers ==
=== In ===
Date	Pos.	Name	From	Fee
Winter	GK	(Germany) Frank Rost	(Germany) Schalke 04	€1,500,000
Winter	FW	(Croatia) Ivica Olić	(Russia) CSKA Moscow	€2,000,000
Winter	FW	(Germany) Mathias Abel	(Germany) Schalke 04	€150,000
	DF	(Argentina) Juan Pablo Sorín	(Spain) Villarreal	€3,000,000
	DF	(Netherlands) Joris Mathijsen	(Netherlands) AZ	€6,000,000
	MF	(Tunisia) Änis Ben-Hatira	(Germany) Hamburger SV II	
	MF	(Serbia) Danijel Ljuboja	(Germany) VfB Stuttgart	€850,000
	DF	(Ivory Coast) Boubacar Sanogo	(Germany) 1. FC Kaiserslautern	€3,800,000
	DF	(Belgium) Vincent Kompany	(Belgium) Anderlecht	€10,500,000
	FW	(Peru) Paolo Guerrero	(Germany) Bayern Munich	€2,500,000
	DF	(United States) Benny Feilhaber	(Germany) Hamburger SV II	
	DF	(Germany) Wolfgang Hesl	(Germany) Hamburger SV II	

=== Out ===
Date	Pos.	Name	To	Fee
Winter	MF	(Germany) Markus Karl	(Germany) Greuther Fürth	€100,000
Winter	FW	(Germany) Benjamin Lauth	(Germany) VfB Stuttgart	€400,000
	DF	(Netherlands) Khalid Boulahrouz	(England) Chelsea	€13,200,000
	FW	(Germany) Mustafa Kučuković	(Germany) Greuther Fürth	
	DF	(Belgium) Daniel Van Buyten	(Germany) Bayern Munich	€8,000,000
	FW	(Japan) Naohiro Takahara	(Germany) Eintracht Frankfurt	€750,000
	DF	(Germany) Daniel Ziebig	(Germany) Energie Cottbus	€150,000
	DF	(Germany) Stefan Beinlich	(Germany) Hansa Rostock	
	DF	(Ghana) Charles Takyi	(Netherlands) AZ	
	MF	(Bosnia and Herzegovina) Sergej Barbarez	(Germany) Bayer Leverkusen	
	DF	(Slovenia) Mišo Brečko	(Germany) Erzgebirge Aue	€30,000

== Kits ==
Home	Home alternate	Away	Away alternate	Third
