= 2004–05 Hamburger SV season =

Hamburger SV
2004–05 season
- Chairman: Bernd Hoffmann
- Head coach: Klaus Toppmöller (until 17 October); Thomas Doll (from 17 October)
- Stadium: Volksparkstadion
- Bundesliga: 8th
- DFB-Pokal: First round
- UEFA Intertoto Cup: Semi-finals
Home colours	Away colours

The 2004–05 season was the 85th season in the existence of Hamburger SV and the club's 42nd consecutive season in the top flight of German football. In addition to the domestic league, Hamburger SV participated in this season's edition of the DFB-Pokal and the Intertoto Cup. The season covered the period from 1 July 2004 to 30 June 2005.

== Players ==
=== First-team squad ===
Squad at end of season

Note: Flags indicate national team as defined under FIFA eligibility rules; some limited exceptions apply. Players may hold more than one non-FIFA nationality.

No.	Pos.	Nation	Player
1	GK	GER	Martin Pieckenhagen
2	DF	GER	Björn Schlicke
4	DF	GER	Bastian Reinhardt
5	DF	BEL	Daniel Van Buyten
6	MF	SUI	Raphaël Wicky
7	MF	IRI	Mehdi Mahdavikia
8	MF	POR	Almami Moreira (Note: Moreira was born in Bissau, Guinea-Bissau, but also qualified to represent Portugal internationally and represented Portugal at U-21 and B level before making his international debut for Guinea-Bissau in October 2010.) (on loan from Standard Liège)
10	FW	BIH	Sergej Barbarez
11	FW	GER	Benjamin Lauth
12	GK	GER	Sascha Kirschstein
13	MF	GER	Leonhard Haas
14	MF	CZE	David Jarolím
15	MF	GER	Piotr Trochowski (Note: Trochowski was born in Tczew, Poland, but was raised in Germany from the age of 5 and represented Germany at U-18, U-20, and U-21 level before making his international debut for Germany in October 2006.)
16	DF	GER	René Klingbeil

No.	Pos.	Nation	Player
17	DF	BRA	Jean Carlos (on loan from Feyenoord)
18	MF	GER	Oliver Hampel
19	FW	GER	Mustafa Kučuković (Note: Kučuković was born in Bosanski Novi, Socialist Republic of Bosnia and Herzegovina, SFR Yugoslavia (now Novi Grad, Bosnia and Herzegovina), but was raised in Germany from the age of 5 and represented Germany at U-19, U-20, and U-21 level.)
21	DF	NED	Khalid Boulahrouz
22	MF	GER	Stefan Beinlich
23	GK	GER	Stefan Wächter
24	DF	SLO	Mišo Brečko
25	FW	BEL	Émile Mpenza
26	DF	GER	Boris Leschinski
27	MF	GER	Alexander Laas
28	DF	NAM	Collin Benjamin
30	MF	GER	Eren Şen
31	MF	GHA	Charles Takyi
32	FW	JPN	Naohiro Takahara

=== Left club during season ===
Note: Flags indicate national team as defined under FIFA eligibility rules; some limited exceptions apply. Players may hold more than one non-FIFA nationality.

No.	Pos.	Nation	Player
3	DF	GER	Christian Rahn (to 1. FC Köln)
9	FW	ARG	Bernardo Romeo (on loan to Mallorca)
15	DF	GER	Stephan Kling (to 1. FC Saarbrücken)

No.	Pos.	Nation	Player
20	MF	BLR	Vyacheslav Hleb (to Grasshoppers)
—	FW	SCG	Besart Berisha (Note: Berisha was born in Pristina, Socialist Republic of Serbia, SFR Yugoslavia (now Kosovo, but part of Serbia and Montenegro during the 2004–05 season), but also qualified to represent Albania internationally and made his international debut for Albania in October 2006 and for Kosovo in March 2017.) (on loan to Aalborg BK)

=== Hamburger SV Amateure ===
Note: Flags indicate national team as defined under FIFA eligibility rules; some limited exceptions apply. Players may hold more than one non-FIFA nationality.

No.	Pos.	Nation	Player
—	GK	GER	Wolfgang Hesl
—	DF	GER	Volker Schmidt

No.	Pos.	Nation	Player
—	MF	GER	Sidney Sam
—	FW	GER	Rouwen Hennings

== Competitions ==
=== Overall record ===
Competition	First match	Last match	Starting round	Final position	Record							
Competition	First match	Last match	Starting round	Final position	Pld	W	D	L	GF	GA	GD	Win %
Bundesliga	2004	21 May 2005	Matchday 1	8th	34	16	3	15	55	50	+5	47.06
DFB-Pokal	21 August 2004	21 August 2004	First round	First round	1	0	0	1	2	4	−2	0.00
Intertoto Cup	17 July 2004	4 August 2004	First round	Semi-finals	4	1	1	2	5	5	+0	25.00
Total					39	17	4	18	62	59	+3	43.59

Source: Competitions

=== Bundesliga ===
==== League table ====
Pos	Team	Pld	W	D	L	GF	GA	GD	Pts	Qualification or relegation
6	Bayer Leverkusen	34	16	9	9	65	44	+21	57	Qualification to UEFA Cup first round (Note: Since DFB Cup winners Bayern Munich and finalists Schalke 04 both qualified for the Champions League, the UEFA Cup place for the cup-winners was given to 6th placed Bayer Leverkusen.)
7	Borussia Dortmund	34	15	10	9	47	44	+3	55	Qualification to Intertoto Cup third round
8	Hamburger SV	34	16	3	15	55	50	+5	51	Qualification to Intertoto Cup second round
9	VfL Wolfsburg	34	15	3	16	49	51	−2	48	Qualification to Intertoto Cup second round
10	Hannover 96	34	13	6	15	34	36	−2	45	

Rules for classification: 1) points; 2) goal difference; 3) number of goals scored.

==== Results summary ====
Overall								Home						Away					
Pld	W	D	L	GF	GA	GD	Pts	W	D	L	GF	GA	GD	W	D	L	GF	GA	GD
34	16	3	15	55	50	+5	51	9	1	7	27	22	+5	7	2	8	28	28	0

Source: DFB

==== Results by round ====
Round	1	2	3	4	5	6	7	8	9	10	11	12	13	14	15	16	17	18	19	20	21	22	23	24	25	26	27	28	29	30	31	32	33	34
Ground	H	?	H	?	?	H	A	?	?	?	?	?	?	H	?	?	A	A	?	A	?	?	A	H	?	?	?	?	?	?	A	?	?	H
Result	L	?	W	?	?	W	L	?	?	?	?	?	?	W	?	?	W	L	?	W	?	?	L	L	?	?	?	?	?	?	L	?	?	L
Position	?	?	?	?	?	?	?	?	?	?	?	?	?	?	?	?	?	?	?	?	?	?	?	?	?	?	?	?	?	?	?	?	?	8

Source: DFB
A = Away; H = Home; W = Win; D = Draw; L = Loss

==== Matches ====
1	Hamburg	0–2	Bayern Munich
			Ballack 22'; Deisler 71'

28 August 2004 3	Hamburger SV	4–3	1. FC Nürnberg	Hamburg
15:30 CEST (UTC+02)	van Buyten 12'; Schlicke 40'; Mpenza 51'; Lauth 86'	Match Report	38', 76', 83' Mintál	Stadium: Volksparkstadion; Attendance: 36,587; Referee: Markus Merk; Man of the Match: Mintál

26 September 2004 6	Hamburger SV	2–1	Hertha BSC
CEST (UTC+2)

2 October 2004 7	Bayer Leverkusen	3–0	Hamburger SV	Leverkusen
10:30	Jacek Krzynówek 10'; Juan 73'; Dimitar Berbatov 87'			Stadium: BayArena; Attendance: 22,500

14	Hamburger SV	3–1	VfL Wolfsburg
	Van Buyten 40'; Barbarez 45'; Romeo 90'		Brdarić 1'

11 December 2004 17	VfL Bochum	1–2	Hamburger SV	Bochum
15:30	Bechmann 83'		Barbarez 26'; Benjamin 34'	Stadium: Ruhrstadion; Attendance: 25,990; Referee: Knut Kircher (Rottenburg)

18	Bayern Munich	3–0	Hamburg
	Pizarro 22'; Klingbeil 38' (o.g.); Makaay 56'

5 February 2005 20	1. FC Nürnberg	1–3	Hamburger SV	Nuremberg
15:30 CET (UTC+01)	Vittek 82'	Match Report	31', 53' Takahara; 90' Lauth	Stadium: Frankenstadion; Attendance: 22,264; Referee: Thorsten Kinhöfer; Man of the Match: Takahara

26 February 2005 23	Hertha BSC	4–1	Hamburger SV	Berlin
CEST (UTC+2)				Stadium: Olympiastadion

5 March 2005 24	Hamburger SV	1–0	Bayer Leverkusen	Hamburg
11:30	Daniel Van Buyten 22'			Stadium: AOL Arena; Attendance: 43,959

31	VfL Wolfsburg	1–0	Hamburger SV
	Petrov 41'

21 May 2005 34	Hamburger SV	0–1	VfL Bochum	Hamburg
15:30			Diabang 3'	Stadium: AOL Arena; Attendance: 54,178; Referee: Markus Schmidt (Stuttgart)
