= 2005–06 Hamburger SV season =

Hamburger SV
2005–06 season
- Chairman: Bernd Hoffmann
- Head coach: Thomas Doll
- Stadium: Volksparkstadion
- Bundesliga: 3rd
- DFB-Pokal: Round of 16
- UEFA Cup: Round of 16
- Top goalscorer: League: Sergej Barbarez (10); All: Rafael van der Vaart (14)
Home colours	Away colours

The 2005–06 season was the 86th season in the existence of Hamburger SV and the club's 43rd consecutive season in the top flight of German football. In addition to the domestic league, Hamburger SV participated in this season's edition of the DFB-Pokal and the UEFA Cup. The season covered the period from 1 July 2005 to 30 June 2006.

== Transfers ==
=== In ===
Note: Flags indicate national team as defined under FIFA eligibility rules; some limited exceptions apply. Players may hold more than one non-FIFA nationality.

No.	Pos.	Nation	Player
3	DF	CMR	Thimothée Atouba (from (England) Tottenham Hotspur)
8	MF	GER	Markus Karl (from (Germany) Greuther Fürth)
17	DF	GER	Daniel Ziebig (from (Germany) Dynamo Dresden)
13	MF	GER	Mario Fillinger (from (Germany) Chemnitzer FC)
20	DF	CIV	Guy Demel (from (Germany) Borussia Dortmund)
23	MF	NED	Rafael van der Vaart (from (Netherlands) AFC Ajax)
24	DF	SUI	Reto Ziegler (on loan from (England) Tottenham Hotspur)
24	FW	BRA	Aílton (on loan from (Turkey) Beşiktaş)
28	MF	NED	Nigel de Jong (from (Netherlands) AFC Ajax)
33	MF	USA	Benny Feilhaber (from (United States) UCLA)

=== Out ===
Note: Flags indicate national team as defined under FIFA eligibility rules; some limited exceptions apply. Players may hold more than one non-FIFA nationality.

No.	Pos.	Nation	Player
1	GK	GER	Martin Pieckenhagen (to (Netherlands) Heracles Almelo)
2	DF	GER	Björn Schlicke (to (Germany) 1. FC Köln)
13	MF	GER	Leonhard Haas (to (Germany) FC Augsburg)
17	DF	GER	Daniel Ziebig (on loan to (Germany) Energie Cottbus)
24	DF	SLO	Mišo Brečko (on loan to (Germany) Hansa Rostock)
25	FW	BEL	Émile Mpenza (to (Qatar) Al-Rayyan)
30	MF	GER	Eren Şen (to (Switzerland) Thun)
—	FW	SCG	Besart Berisha (Note: Berisha was born in Pristina, Socialist Republic of Serbia, SFR Yugoslavia (now Kosovo, but part of Serbia and Montenegro during the 2005–06 season), but also qualified to represent Albania internationally and made his international debut for Albania in October 2006 and for Kosovo in March 2017.) (on loan to (Denmark) AC Horsens)

== Players ==
=== First-team squad ===
Squad at end of season

Note: Flags indicate national team as defined under FIFA eligibility rules; some limited exceptions apply. Players may hold more than one non-FIFA nationality.

No.	Pos.	Nation	Player1
—	GK	GER	Stefan Wächter
3	DF	CMR	Thimothée Atouba
4	DF	GER	Bastian Reinhardt
5	DF	BEL	Daniel Van Buyten
6	MF	SUI	Raphaël Wicky
7	MF	IRI	Mehdi Mahdavikia
8	MF	GER	Markus Karl
10	FW	BIH	Sergej Barbarez
11	FW	GER	Benjamin Lauth
12	GK	GER	Sascha Kirschstein
13	MF	GER	Mario Fillinger
14	MF	CZE	David Jarolím
15	MF	GER	Piotr Trochowski (Note: Trochowski was born in Tczew, Poland, but was raised in Germany from the age of 5 and represented Germany at U-18, U-20, and U-21 level before making his international debut for Germany in October 2006.)
16	DF	GER	René Klingbeil
18	MF	GER	Oliver Hampel

No.	Pos.	Nation	Player
19	FW	GER	Mustafa Kučuković (Note: Kučuković was born in Bosanski Novi, Socialist Republic of Bosnia and Herzegovina, SFR Yugoslavia (now Novi Grad, Bosnia and Herzegovina), but was raised in Germany from the age of 5 and represented Germany at U-19, U-20, and U-21 level.)
20	DF	CIV	Guy Demel (Note: Demel was born in Orsay, France, but acquired an Ivory Coast passport in 2004 and made his international debut for the Ivory Coast in 2004.)
21	DF	NED	Khalid Boulahrouz
22	MF	GER	Stefan Beinlich
23	MF	NED	Rafael van der Vaart
24	FW	BRA	Aílton (on loan from Beşiktaş)
26	DF	GER	Volker Schmidt
27	MF	GER	Alexander Laas
28	MF	NED	Nigel de Jong
31	MF	GHA	Charles Takyi
32	FW	JPN	Naohiro Takahara
33	MF	USA	Benny Feilhaber (Note: Feilhaber was born in Rio de Janeiro, Brazil, but was raised in the United States from the age of 6 and represented the United States at U-20 and U-23 level before making his international debut for the United States in March 2007.)
35	DF	GER	Boris Leschinski
37	FW	GER	Rouwen Hennings

=== Left club during season ===
Note: Flags indicate national team as defined under FIFA eligibility rules; some limited exceptions apply. Players may hold more than one non-FIFA nationality.

No.	Pos.	Nation	Player
17	DF	GER	Daniel Ziebig (on loan to Energie Cottbus)
24	DF	SLO	Mišo Brečko (on loan to Hansa Rostock)
24	DF	SUI	Reto Ziegler (on loan from Tottenham Hotspur)

No.	Pos.	Nation	Player
25	FW	BEL	Émile Mpenza (to Al-Rayyan)
—	FW	SCG	Besart Berisha (Note: Berisha was born in Pristina, Socialist Republic of Serbia, SFR Yugoslavia (now Kosovo, but part of Serbia and Montenegro during the 2005–06 season), but also qualified to represent Albania internationally and made his international debut for Albania in October 2006 and for Kosovo in March 2017.) (on loan to AC Horsens)

=== Hamburger SV II ===
Note: Flags indicate national team as defined under FIFA eligibility rules; some limited exceptions apply. Players may hold more than one non-FIFA nationality.

No. / Pos. / Nation / Player; — / GK / GER / Wolfgang Hesl	No. / Pos. / Nation / Player; — / MF / GER / Sidney Sam

== Competitions ==
=== Overall record ===
Competition	First match	Last match	Starting round	Final position	Record							
Competition	First match	Last match	Starting round	Final position	Pld	W	D	L	GF	GA	GD	Win %
Bundesliga	6 August 2005	13 May 2006	Matchday 1	3rd	34	21	5	8	53	30	+23	61.76
DFB-Pokal	20 August 2005	21 December 2005	First round	Round of 16	3	2	0	1	8	4	+4	66.67
UEFA Cup	15 September 2005	15 March 2006	First round	Round of 16	10	6	1	3	12	7	+5	60.00
Total					47	29	6	12	73	41	+32	61.70

Source: Competitions

=== Bundesliga ===
==== League table ====
Pos	Team	Pld	W	D	L	GF	GA	GD	Pts	Qualification or relegation
1	Bayern Munich (C)	34	22	9	3	67	32	+35	75	Qualification to Champions League group stage
2	Werder Bremen	34	21	7	6	79	37	+42	70	Qualification to Champions League group stage
3	Hamburger SV	34	21	5	8	53	30	+23	68	Qualification to Champions League third qualifying round
4	Schalke 04	34	16	13	5	47	31	+16	61	Qualification to UEFA Cup first round
5	Bayer Leverkusen	34	14	10	10	64	49	+15	52	Qualification to UEFA Cup first round

Source: kicker.de
Rules for classification: 1) points; 2) goal difference; 3) number of goals scored.
(C) Champions

==== Results summary ====
Overall								Home						Away					
Pld	W	D	L	GF	GA	GD	Pts	W	D	L	GF	GA	GD	W	D	L	GF	GA	GD
34	21	5	8	53	30	+23	68	10	2	5	26	16	+10	11	3	3	27	14	+13

Source: DFB

==== Results by round ====
Round	1	2	3	4	5	6	7	8	9	10	11	12	13	14	15	16	17	18	19	20	21	22	23	24	25	26	27	28	29	30	31	32	33	34
Ground	H	A	H	A	H	A	H	A	H	A	H	A	H	A	H	H	A	A	H	A	H	A	H	A	H	A	H	A	H	A	H	A	A	H
Result	W	W	D	W	D	W	W	W	L	D	W	D	W	W	W	W	D	L	W	L	W	W	L	W	W	W	L	W	W	W	L	W	L	L
Position	3	3	3	3	3	2	2	2	3	3	3	3	3	2	2	2	2	3	3	3	2	2	3	3	2	2	2	2	2	2	2	2	2	3

Source: DFB
A = Away; H = Home; W = Win; D = Draw; L = Loss

==== Matches ====
6 August 2005 1	Hamburger SV	3–0	1. FC Nürnberg	Hamburg
CEST (UTC+2)				Stadium: Volksparkstadion

13 August 2005 2	Arminia Bielefeld	0–2	Hamburger SV
CEST (UTC+2)

27 August 2005 3	Hamburger SV	1–1	Hannover 96	Hamburg
CEST (UTC+2)				Stadium: Volksparkstadion

10 September 2005 4	Mainz 05	1–3	Hamburger SV
CEST (UTC+2)

17 September 2005 5	Hamburger SV	1–1	Eintracht Frankfurt	Hamburg
CEST (UTC+2)				Stadium: Volksparkstadion

21 September 2005 6	VfB Stuttgart	1–2	Hamburger SV
CEST (UTC+2)

24 September 2005 7	Hamburger SV	2–0	Bayern Munich	Hamburg
CEST (UTC+2)				Stadium: Volksparkstadion

2 October 2005 8	1. FC Kaiserslautern	0–3	Hamburger SV
CEST (UTC+2)

15 October 2005 9	Hamburger SV	0–1	VfL Wolfsburg	Hamburg
CEST (UTC+2)				Stadium: Volksparkstadion

23 October 2005 10	Borussia Dortmund	1–1	Hamburger SV
CEST (UTC+2)

29 October 2005 11	Hamburger SV	1–0	Schalke 04	Hamburg
CEST (UTC+2)				Stadium: Volksparkstadion

6 November 2005 12	Borussia Mönchengladbach	0–0	Hamburger SV
CEST (UTC+2)

20 November 2005 13	Hamburger SV	2–0	MSV Duisburg	Hamburg
CEST (UTC+2)				Stadium: Volksparkstadion

26 November 2005 14	Bayer Leverkusen	0–1	Hamburger SV
CEST (UTC+2)

3 December 2005 15	Hamburger SV	3–1	1. FC Köln	Hamburg
CEST (UTC+2)				Stadium: Volksparkstadion

10 December 2005 16	Hamburger SV	2–1	Hertha BSC	Hamburg
CEST (UTC+2)				Stadium: Volksparkstadion

18 December 2005 17	Werder Bremen	1–1	Hamburger SV
CEST (UTC+2)

28 January 2006 18	1. FC Nürnberg	2–1	Hamburger SV
CEST (UTC+2)

4 February 2006 19	Hamburger SV	2–1	Arminia Bielefeld	Hamburg
CEST (UTC+2)				Stadium: Volksparkstadion

8 February 2006 20	Hannover 96	2–1	Hamburger SV
CEST (UTC+2)

11 February 2006 21	Hamburger SV	1–0	Mainz 05	Hamburg
CEST (UTC+2)				Stadium: Volksparkstadion

19 February 2006 22	Eintracht Frankfurt	1–2	Hamburger SV
CEST (UTC+2)

26 February 2006 23	Hamburger SV	0–2	VfB Stuttgart	Hamburg
CEST (UTC+2)				Stadium: Volksparkstadion

4 March 2006 24	Bayern Munich	1–2	Hamburger SV
CEST (UTC+2)

12 March 2006 25	Hamburger SV	3–0	1. FC Kaiserslautern	Hamburg
CEST (UTC+2)				Stadium: Volksparkstadion

18 March 2006 26	VfL Wolfsburg	0–1	Hamburger SV
CEST (UTC+2)

25 March 2006 27	Hamburger SV	2–4	Borussia Dortmund	Hamburg
CET (UTC+1)				Stadium: Volksparkstadion

2 April 2006 28	Schalke 04	0–2	Hamburger SV
CEST (UTC+2)

9 April 2006 29	Hamburger SV	2–0	Borussia Mönchengladbach	Hamburg
CEST (UTC+2)				Stadium: Volksparkstadion

15 April 2006 30	MSV Duisburg	0–2	Hamburger SV
CEST (UTC+2)

22 April 2006 31	Hamburger SV	0–2	Bayer Leverkusen	Hamburg
CEST (UTC+2)				Stadium: Volksparkstadion

2 May 2006 32	1. FC Köln	0–1	Hamburger SV
CEST (UTC+2)

6 May 2006 33	Hertha BSC	4–2	Hamburger SV
CEST (UTC+2)

13 May 2006 34	Hamburger SV	1–2	Werder Bremen	Hamburg
CEST (UTC+2)				Stadium: Volksparkstadion

=== DFB-Pokal ===
20 August 2005 First round	Stuttgart Kickers	1–5	Hamburger SV	Stuttgart
15:30 CEST (UTC+2)	Mešić 45'		Barbarez 13', 80'; Mešić 69'; Atouba 76'; Mahdavikia 84'	Stadium: Gazi-Stadion auf der Waldau; Attendance: 8,820; Referee: Felix Brych

26 October 2005 Second round	Hamburger SV	3–2	Bayer Leverkusen	Hamburg
19:30 CEST (UTC+2)	Van Buyten 55'; Barbarez 62'; Wicky 84'		Berbatov 3', 81'	Stadium: Volksparkstadion; Attendance: 35,871; Referee: Michael Weiner

21 December 2005 Round of 16	Bayern Munich	1–0 (a.e.t.)	Hamburger SV	Munich
20:30 CET (UTC+1)	Hargreaves 113'			Stadium: Allianz Arena; Attendance: 66,000; Referee: Thorsten Kinhöfer

=== UEFA Cup ===
==== First round ====
15 September 2005 First leg	Hamburger SV (Germany)	1–1	(Denmark) Copenhagen	Hamburg, Germany
20:30 CEST (UTC+2)	Van der Vaart 37'		Van Heerden 40'	Stadium: Volksparkstadion; Attendance: 43,100; Referee: Eric Braamhaar (Netherlands)

29 September 2005 Second leg	Copenhagen (Denmark)	0–1 (1–2 agg.)	(Germany) Hamburger SV	Copenhagen, Denmark
21:00 CEST (UTC+2)			Van der Vaart 90+1' (pen.)	Stadium: Parken Stadium; Attendance: 34,450; Referee: Matt Messias (England)

==== Group stage ====
September 2005	–	Hamburger SV
CEST (UTC+2)

== Statistics ==
=== Goalscorers ===
Rank	No.	Pos	Nat	Name	Bundesliga	DFB-Pokal	UEFA Cup	Total
1	23	MF	(Netherlands)	Rafael van der Vaart	9	0	5	14
2	10	FW	(Bosnia and Herzegovina)	Sergej Barbarez	10	0	2	12
3	11	FW	(Germany)	Benjamin Lauth	6	0	2	8
4	15	MF	(Germany)	Piotr Trochowski	5	0	0	5
4	7	FW	(Iran)	Mehdi Mahdavikia	5	0	0	5
Totals					53	8	12	73
