= 2007–08 Hamburger SV season =

Hamburger SV
2007–08 season
- Manager: Huub Stevens
- Stadium: Volksparkstadion
- Bundesliga: 4th
- DFB-Pokal: Quarter-finals
- Intertoto Cup: Winners
- UEFA Cup: Round of 16
- Top goalscorer: Ivica Olić & Paolo Guerrero (14)
Home colours	Away colours	Third colours

During the 2007–08 German football season, Hamburger SV competed in the Bundesliga.

== Season summary ==
Hamburg improved to finish fourth, though they were 10 points off Champions League qualification.

== First-team squad ==
Squad at end of season

Note: Flags indicate national team as defined under FIFA eligibility rules; some limited exceptions apply. Players may hold more than one non-FIFA nationality.

No.	Pos.	Nation	Player
1	GK	(Germany) GER	Frank Rost
2	DF	(Argentina) ARG	Juan Pablo Sorín
3	DF	(Cameroon) CMR	Timothée Atouba
4	DF	(Germany) GER	Bastian Reinhardt
5	DF	(Netherlands) NED	Joris Mathijsen
6	MF	(Belgium) BEL	Vadis Odjidja-Ofoe
7	FW	(Egypt) EGY	Mohamed Zidan
8	MF	(Netherlands) NED	Nigel de Jong
9	FW	(Peru) PER	Paolo Guerrero
10	DF	(Belgium) BEL	Vincent Kompany
11	FW	(Croatia) CRO	Ivica Olić
12	GK	(Germany) GER	Wolfgang Hesl
13	MF	(Germany) GER	Mario Fillinger
14	MF	(Czech Republic) CZE	David Jarolím
15	MF	(Germany) GER	Piotr Trochowski (Note: Trochowski was born in Tczew, Poland, but was raised in Germany from the age of 5 and made his international debut for Germany in October 2002.)

No.	Pos.	Nation	Player
16	MF	(Belarus) BLR	Anton Putsila (on loan from Dinamo Minsk)
17	FW	(Nigeria) NGA	Macauley Chrisantus
18	MF	(Netherlands) NED	Romeo Castelen (Note: Castelen was born in Paramaribo, Suriname, but also qualified to represent the Netherlands internationally and made his international debut for the Netherlands in August 2004.)
19	DF	(Germany) GER	Jérôme Boateng
20	DF	(Ivory Coast) CIV	Guy Demel (Note: Demel was born in Orsay, France, but also holds an Ivory Coast passport and made his international debut for the Ivory Coast in 2004.)
22	FW	(Germany) GER	Eric Maxim Choupo-Moting (Note: Choupo-Moting was born in Hamburg, Germany, and represented them at U-19 and U-21 level, but also qualified to represent Cameroon internationally and would make his international debut for Cameroon in 2010.)
23	MF	(Netherlands) NED	Rafael van der Vaart
24	DF	(Slovenia) SVN	Mišo Brečko
26	DF	(Germany) GER	Volker Schmidt
28	MF	(Ghana) GHA	Otto Addo (Note: Addo was born in Hamburg, Germany, but also qualified to represent Ghana internationally and made his international debut for Ghana in February 1999.)
29	GK	(Germany) GER	Raphael Wolf
30	DF	(Namibia) NAM	Collin Benjamin
31	MF	(Germany) GER	Timo Kunert
32	MF	(Germany) GER	Änis Ben-Hatira (Note: Ben-Hatira was born in West Berlin, Germany, and represented them at U-19, U-20, and U-21 level, but also qualified to represent Tunisia internationally and would make his international debut for Tunisia in February 2012.)
34	FW	(Germany) GER	Sidney Sam

=== Left club during season ===
Note: Flags indicate national team as defined under FIFA eligibility rules; some limited exceptions apply. Players may hold more than one non-FIFA nationality.

No.	Pos.	Nation	Player
6	MF	(Switzerland) SUI	Raphaël Wicky (to Sion)
16	FW	(Germany) GER	Mustafa Kučuković (Note: Kučuković was born in Novi Grad, SFR Yugoslavia (now Bosnia and Herzegovina), but also qualified to represent Germany internationally and represented them at U-19, U-20, and U-21 level.) (to 1860 Munich)

No.	Pos.	Nation	Player
21	DF	(Germany) GER	Sebastian Langkamp (to Karlsruhe)
25	MF	(Democratic Republic of the Congo) COD	Kosi Saka (on loan to Carl Zeiss Jena)

== Competitions ==
=== Bundesliga ===
==== League table ====
Pos	Team	Pld	W	D	L	GF	GA	GD	Pts	Qualification or relegation
2	Werder Bremen	34	20	6	8	75	45	+30	66	Qualification to Champions League group stage
3	Schalke 04	34	18	10	6	55	32	+23	64	Qualification to Champions League third qualifying round
4	Hamburger SV	34	14	12	8	47	26	+21	54	Qualification to UEFA Cup first round
5	VfL Wolfsburg	34	15	9	10	58	46	+12	54	Qualification to UEFA Cup first round
6	VfB Stuttgart	34	16	4	14	57	57	0	52	Qualification to Intertoto Cup third round

Source: www.dfb.de
Rules for classification: 1) points; 2) goal difference; 3) number of goals scored.

=== Intertoto Cup ===
==== Third round ====
21 July 2007	Dacia Chișinău (Moldova)	1–1	(Germany) Hamburg	Zimbru Stadium, Chișinău
	Boicenco 7'		van der Vaart 70' (pen.)	Attendance: 7,000; Referee: Bruno Paixão (Portugal)

29 July 2007	Hamburg (Germany)	4–0 (5–1 agg.)	(Moldova) Dacia Chișinău	AOL Arena, Hamburg
	Kompany 50' van der Vaart 71'; Benjamin 76'; Jarolím 89'			Attendance: 51,000; Referee: Ivan Bebek (Croatia)

=== UEFA Cup ===
==== Second qualifying round ====
16 August 2007	Honvéd (Hungary)	0–0	(Germany) Hamburg	Szusza Ferenc Stadium, Budapest
19:00 CET				Referee: Björn Kuipers (Netherlands)

30 August 2007	Hamburg (Germany)	4–0 (4–0 agg.)	(Hungary) Honvéd	HSH Nordbank Arena, Hamburg
20:30 CET	Guerrero 9', 38'; Smiljanić 50' (o.g.); Choupo-Moting 90'			Referee: Julián Rodríguez Santiago (Spain)

==== First round ====
18 September 2007	Litex Lovech (Bulgaria)	0–1	(Germany) Hamburg	Lovech Stadium, Lovech
			Castelen 75'	Referee: Tony Asumaa (Finland)

4 October 2007	Hamburg (Germany)	3–1 (4–1 agg.)	(Bulgaria) Litex Lovech	Volksparkstadion, Hamburg
	Guerrero 40', 52'; Van der Vaart 71'		R. Popov 38'	Referee: Paul Allaerts (Belgium)

==== Group stage ====
Pos	Team	Pld	W	D	L	GF	GA	GD	Pts	Qualification
1	(Germany) Hamburger SV	4	3	1	0	7	1	+6	10	Advance to knockout stage
2	(Switzerland) Basel	4	2	2	0	3	1	+2	8	Advance to knockout stage
3	(Norway) Brann	4	1	1	2	3	4	−1	4	Advance to knockout stage
4	(Croatia) Dinamo Zagreb	4	0	2	2	2	5	−3	2	
5	(France) Rennes	4	0	2	2	2	6	−4	2	

25 October 2007	Brann (Norway)	0–1	(Germany) Hamburg	Brann Stadion, Bergen
19:00		Report	Kompany 62'	Attendance: 13,029; Referee: Georgios Kasnaferis (Greece)

29 November 2007	Hamburg (Germany)	3–0	(France) Rennes	HSH Nordbank Arena, Hamburg
19:00	Van der Vaart 30'; Choupo-Moting 84'; Zidan 90'	Report		Attendance: 36,472; Referee: Mark Clattenburg (England)

5 December 2007	Dinamo Zagreb (Croatia)	0–2	(Germany) Hamburg	Maksimir Stadium, Zagreb
20:45		Report	De Jong 88'; Trochowski 90+3' (pen.)	Attendance: 18,870; Referee: Douglas McDonald (Scotland)

20 December 2007	Hamburg (Germany)	1–1	(Switzerland) Basel	HSH Nordbank Arena, Hamburg
20:45	Olić 73'	Report	Ergić 58'	Attendance: 48,917; Referee: Nicolai Vollquartz (Denmark)

==== Round of 32 ====
14 February 2008	Zürich (Switzerland)	1–3	(Germany) Hamburg	Letzigrund, Zürich
20:30	Hassli 88'	(Report)	Jarolím 49'; Olić 67'; Trochowski 77'	Attendance: 16,800; Referee: Alan Kelly (Ireland)

21 February 2008	Hamburg (Germany)	0–0 (3–1 agg.)	(Switzerland) Zürich	Arena Hamburg, Hamburg
17:00		(Report)		Attendance: 33,586; Referee: Kristinn Jakobsson (Iceland)

==== Round of 16 ====
6 March 2008	Bayer Leverkusen (Germany)	1–0	(Germany) Hamburg	BayArena, Leverkusen
21:05	Gekas 77'	(Report)		Attendance: 22,500; Referee: Craig Thomson (Scotland)

12 March 2008	Hamburg (Germany)	3–2 (3–3a agg.)	(Germany) Bayer Leverkusen	Arena Hamburg, Hamburg
17:45	Trochowski 53'; Guerrero 65'; Van der Vaart 81'	(Report)	Barbarez 19'; Gekas 55'	Attendance: 37,083; Referee: Alberto Undiano Mallenco (Spain)
