= 2008–09 Hamburger SV season =

Hamburger SV
2008–09 season
- Manager: Martin Jol
- Stadium: Volksparkstadion
- Bundesliga: 5th
- DFB-Pokal: Semi-finals
- UEFA Cup: Semi-finals
- Top goalscorer: League: Mladen Petrić (12); All: Mladen Petrić (20)
| Home colours | Away colours | Third colours |

During the 2008–09 German football season, Hamburger SV competed in the Bundesliga.

== Season summary ==
Hamburg finished fifth, eight points off first. They also made it to the semi-finals of the DFB-Pokal and the UEFA Cup, but were beaten by Werder Bremen in both competitions, on penalties and away goals respectively.

== Players ==
=== First-team squad ===
Squad at end of season

Note: Flags indicate national team as defined under FIFA eligibility rules; some limited exceptions apply. Players may hold more than one non-FIFA nationality.

| No. | Pos. | Nation | Player |
|---|---|---|---|
| 1 | GK | GER | Frank Rost |
| 2 | DF | BRA | Alex Silva |
| 3 | DF | CMR | Timothée Atouba |
| 4 | DF | GER | Bastian Reinhardt |
| 5 | DF | NED | Joris Mathijsen |
| 7 | DF | GER | Marcell Jansen |
| 8 | MF | GER | Albert Streit (Note: Streit was born in Bucharest, Romania, but also qualified to represent Germany internationally and represented them at U-16, U-17, U-18, and B level.) (on loan from FC Schalke 04) |
| 9 | FW | PER | Paolo Guerrero |
| 10 | FW | CRO | Mladen Petrić (Note: Petrić was born in Brčko, Yugoslavia (now Bosnia and Herzegovina), but was raised in Switzerland and also qualified to represent Croatia internationally and represented Switzerland at U-17 and U-21 level before making his international debut for Croatia in November 2001.) |
| 11 | FW | CRO | Ivica Olić |
| 12 | GK | GER | Wolfgang Hesl |
| 14 | MF | CZE | David Jarolím |
| 15 | MF | GER | Piotr Trochowski (Note: Trochowski was born in Tczew, Poland, but was raised in Germany from the age of 5 and made his international debut for Germany in October 2002.) |
| 16 | DF | DEN | Michael Gravgaard (on loan from Nantes) |
| 17 | FW | NGA | Macauley Chrisantus |
| 18 | MF | NED | Romeo Castelen (Note: Castelen was born in Paramaribo, Suriname, but also qualified to represent the Netherlands internationally and made his international debut for the Netherlands in August 2004.) |

| No. | Pos. | Nation | Player |
|---|---|---|---|
| 19 | DF | GER | Jérôme Boateng |
| 20 | DF | CIV | Guy Demel (Note: Demel was born in Orsay, France, but also holds an Ivory Coast passport and made his international debut for the Ivory Coast in 2004.) |
| 21 | MF | BFA | Jonathan Pitroipa |
| 22 | FW | GER | Eric Maxim Choupo-Moting (Note: Choupo-Moting was born in Hamburg, West Germany, and represented Germany at U-19 and U-21 level, but also qualified to represent Cameroon internationally through his father and made his international debut for Cameroon in June 2010.) |
| 24 | FW | CMR | Marcel Ndjeng (Note: Ndjeng was born in Bonn, West Germany, but also qualified to represent Cameroon internationally through his father and made his international debut for Cameroon in May 2008.) (on loan from Borussia Mönchengladbach) |
| 25 | MF | VEN | Tomás Rincón |
| 26 | DF | GER | Volker Schmidt |
| 28 | MF | SEN | Mickaël Tavares (Note: Tavares was born in Villeneuve-Saint-Georges, France, but also qualified to represent Cape Verde and Senegal internationally through his mother and father respectively and was called up by Cape Verde in May 2008 before making his international debut for Senegal in 2009.) |
| 29 | GK | GER | Raphael Wolf |
| 30 | DF | NAM | Collin Benjamin |
| 31 | MF | GER | Timo Kunert |
| 33 | GK | MAR | Khalid Sinouh (Note: Sinouh was born in Amsterdam, Netherlands, but also qualified to represent Morocco internationally and made his international debut for Morocco in 2004.) |
| 34 | DF | GER | Kai-Fabian Schulz |
| 35 | FW | TUR | Tunay Torun (Note: Torun was born in Hamburg, West Germany, but also qualified to represent Turkey internationally and represented them at U-15, U-16, U-17, U-18, U-21 and B level before making his international debut for Turkey in February 2011.) |
| 36 | MF | GER | Hanno Behrens |
| 40 | DF | GER | Dennis Aogo |

=== Left club during season ===
Note: Flags indicate national team as defined under FIFA eligibility rules; some limited exceptions apply. Players may hold more than one non-FIFA nationality.

| No. | Pos. | Nation | Player |
|---|---|---|---|
| 6 | MF | BEL | Vadis Odjidja-Ofoe (to Club Brugge) |
| 7 | FW | EGY | Mohamed Zidan (to Borussia Dortmund) |
| 8 | DF | NED | Nigel de Jong (to Manchester City) |
| 10 | DF | BEL | Vincent Kompany (to Manchester City) |
| 16 | MF | BLR | Anton Putsila (on loan from Dinamo Minsk) |

| No. | Pos. | Nation | Player |
|---|---|---|---|
| 24 | DF | CZE | Miroslav Štěpánek (on loan to Kapfenberger SV) |
| 27 | MF | BRA | Thiago Neves (on loan to Fluminense) |
| 32 | MF | GER | Änis Ben-Hatira (Note: Ben-Hatira was born in West Berlin, West Germany, and represented Germany at U-19, U-20, and U-21 level, but also qualified to represent Tunisia internationally and made his international debut for Tunisia in February 2012.) (on loan to MSV Duisburg) |
| 33 | FW | USA | Preston Zimmerman (to Kapfenberger SV) |
| 34 | MF | GER | Sidney Sam (on loan to Kaiserslautern) |

== Transfers ==
=== Out ===
- Otto Addo - retired

== Competitions ==
=== Bundesliga ===
==== League table ====
| Pos | Team | Pld | W | D | L | GF | GA | GD | Pts | Qualification or relegation |
|---|---|---|---|---|---|---|---|---|---|---|
| 3 | VfB Stuttgart | 34 | 19 | 7 | 8 | 63 | 43 | +20 | 64 | Qualification to Champions League play-off round |
| 4 | Hertha BSC | 34 | 19 | 6 | 9 | 48 | 41 | +7 | 63 | Qualification to Europa League play-off round |
| 5 | Hamburger SV | 34 | 19 | 4 | 11 | 49 | 47 | +2 | 61 | Qualification to Europa League third qualifying round |
| 6 | Borussia Dortmund | 34 | 15 | 14 | 5 | 60 | 37 | +23 | 59 | |
| 7 | 1899 Hoffenheim | 34 | 15 | 10 | 9 | 63 | 49 | +14 | 55 | |

Source: kicker (in German)
Rules for classification: 1) points; 2) goal difference; 3) number of goals scored.

=== UEFA Cup ===
==== First round ====
| 18 September 2008 | Hamburg (Germany) | 0–0 | (Romania) Unirea Urziceni | HSH Nordbank Arena, Hamburg |
| 19:00 CET | | Report | | Attendance: 39,010; Referee: Fırat Aydınus (Turkey) |

| 2 October 2008 | Unirea Urziceni (Romania) | 0–2 (0–2 agg.) | (Germany) Hamburg | Stadionul Tineretului, Urziceni |
| 18:00 | | Report | Petrić 27', 51' | Attendance: 5,500; Referee: Sten Kaldma (Estonia) |

==== Group stage ====
| Pos | Team | Pld | W | D | L | GF | GA | GD | Pts | Qualification |
|---|---|---|---|---|---|---|---|---|---|---|
| 1 | (Germany) Hamburger SV | 4 | 3 | 0 | 1 | 7 | 3 | +4 | 9 | Advance to knockout stage |
| 2 | (Netherlands) Ajax | 4 | 2 | 1 | 1 | 5 | 4 | +1 | 7 | Advance to knockout stage |
| 3 | (England) Aston Villa | 4 | 2 | 0 | 2 | 5 | 6 | −1 | 6 | Advance to knockout stage |
| 4 | (Slovakia) Žilina | 4 | 1 | 1 | 2 | 3 | 4 | −1 | 4 | |
| 5 | (Czech Republic) Slavia Prague | 4 | 0 | 2 | 2 | 2 | 5 | −3 | 2 | |

Source: RSSSF

| 23 October 2008 | Žilina (Slovakia) | 1–2 | (Germany) Hamburg | Stadium Pod Dubňom, Žilina |
| 18:30 UTC+2 | Rilke 69' | Report | Petrić 15'; Olić 45+1' | Attendance: 9,871; Referee: Tony Asumaa (Finland) |

| 27 November 2008 | Hamburg (Germany) | 0–1 | (Netherlands) Ajax | HSH Nordbank Arena, Hamburg |
| 21:00 UTC+1 | | Report | Leonardo 77' | Attendance: 51,200; Referee: Paolo Tagliavento (Italy) |

| 4 December 2008 | Slavia Prague (Czech Republic) | 0–2 | (Germany) Hamburg | Synot Tip Arena, Prague |
| 20:45 UTC+1 | | Report | Olić 30'; Petrić 90+4' (pen.) | Attendance: 17,368; Referee: Selçuk Dereli (Turkey) |

| 17 December 2008 | Hamburg (Germany) | 3–1 | (England) Aston Villa | HSH Nordbank Arena, Hamburg |
| 20:45 UTC+1 | Petrić 18'; Olić 30', 57' | Report | Delfouneso 83' | Attendance: 49,121; Referee: Aleksei Nikolaev (Russia) |

==== Round of 32 ====
| 18 February 2009 | NEC (Netherlands) | 0–3 | (Germany) Hamburg | Stadion de Goffert, Nijmegen |
| 20:45 | | Report | Trochowski 41'; Silva 45'; Olić 75' | Attendance: 12,500; Referee: Darko Ceferin (Slovenia) |

| 26 February 2009 | Hamburg (Germany) | 1–0 (4–0 agg.) | (Netherlands) NEC | HSH Nordbank Arena, Hamburg |
| 18:15 | Olić 9' | Report | | Attendance: 31,537; Referee: Tony Chapron (France) |

==== Round of 16 ====
| 12 March 2009 | Hamburg (Germany) | 1–1 | (Turkey) Galatasaray | HSH Nordbank Arena, Hamburg |
| 18:00 | Jansen 50' | Report | Akman 33' | Attendance: 50,000; Referee: Viktor Kassai (Hungary) |

| 19 March 2009 | Galatasaray (Turkey) | 2–3 (3–4 agg.) | (Germany) Hamburg | Ali Sami Yen Stadium, Istanbul |
| 20:30 | Kewell 42' (pen.); Baroš 49' | Report | Guerrero 57', 60'; Olić 90' | Attendance: 23,500; Referee: Pedro Proença (Portugal) |

==== Quarter-finals ====
| 9 April 2009 | Hamburg (Germany) | 3–1 | (England) Manchester City | HSH Nordbank Arena, Hamburg |
| 20:45 | Mathijsen 9'; Trochowski 63' (pen.); Guerrero 79' | Report | Ireland 1' | Attendance: 50,500; Referee: Olegário Benquerença (Portugal) |

| 16 April 2009 | Manchester City (England) | 2–1 (3–4 agg.) | (Germany) Hamburg | City of Manchester Stadium, Manchester |
| 20:45 | Elano 17' (pen.); Caicedo 50' | Report | Guerrero 12' | Attendance: 47,009; Referee: Nicola Rizzoli (Italy) |

==== Semi-finals ====
| 30 April 2009 | Werder Bremen (Germany) | 0–1 | (Germany) Hamburg | Weserstadion, Bremen |
| 20:45 | | Report | Trochowski 28' | Attendance: 37,500; Referee: Howard Webb (England) |

| 7 May 2009 | Hamburg (Germany) | 2–3 (3–3a agg.) | (Germany) Werder Bremen | HSH Nordbank Arena, Hamburg |
| 20:45 | Olić 13', 87' | Report | Diego 29'; Pizarro 66'; Baumann 83' | Attendance: 51,000; Referee: Frank De Bleeckere (Belgium) |
