= Bastian Reinhardt =

German footballer

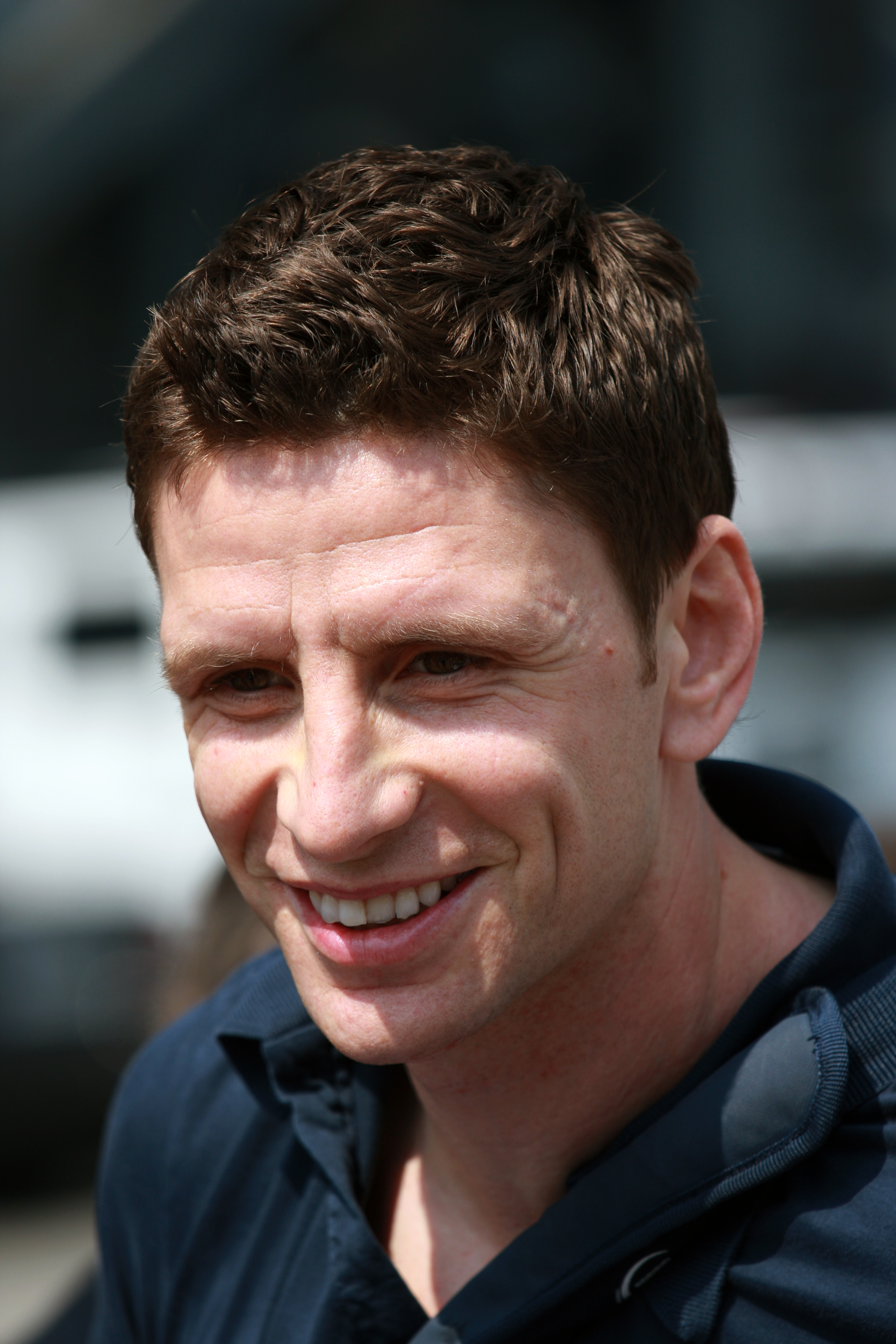

Personal information
- Date of birth: 19 November 1975 (age 50)
- Place of birth: Ludwigslust, East Germany
- Height: 1.94 m (6 ft 4 in)
- Position: Centre back

Team information
- Current team: VfB Lübeck (assistant manager)

Youth career
- 1983–1992: Grabower FC
- 1992–1994: 1. FC Magdeburg

Senior career*
Years	Team	Apps	(Gls)
1994–1997	VfL Hamburg 93		
1997–2000	Hannover 96	58	(4)
2000–2003	Arminia Bielefeld	99	(8)
2003–2010	Hamburger SV	131	(9)

Managerial career
- 2023: VfB Lübeck (caretaker)
- 2024: VfB Lübeck (caretaker)
- * Club domestic league appearances and goals

Bastian Reinhardt (born 19 November 1975) is a German former footballer and current assistant manager of VfB Lübeck.

== Career ==
Reinhardt began his career 1983 with Empor Grabow/Grabower FC and joined 1. FC Magdeburg in 1992. He left Magdeburg after two years and moved to Hamburg where he joined VfL Hamburg 93. Reinhardt played three years for VfL Hamburg 93 and moved in the summer of 1997 to Hannover 96. In his three years with Hannover 96 he played 58 matches and scored four goals. From 2000 to 2003 Reinhardt played for Arminia Bielefeld 99 matches, scoring eight goals. After the 2002–03 season he transferred to Hamburger SV where he left after six years in May 2009 and was re-signed on 17 July 2009. On 24 May 2010, Hamburger SV announced that Reinhardt would be taking over the vacant post of sportdirector, and would therefore be ending his active career in professional football.

He was named the interim manager of VfB Lübeck in December 2023 for two matches. He took over the same role in March 2024.

== Career statistics ==
=== Club ===
Appearances and goals by club, season and competition
Club	Season	League			National Cup		League Cup		Continental		Other		Total	
Club	Season	Division	Apps	Goals	Apps	Goals	Apps	Goals	Apps	Goals	Apps	Goals	Apps	Goals
Hannover 96	1997–98	Regionalliga Nord	0	0	2	1	—		—		1 (Note: Appearance in the Regionalliga promotion playoff)	0	3	1
Hannover 96	1998–99	2. Bundesliga	25	2	0	0	—		—		—		25	2
Hannover 96	1999–2000	2. Bundesliga	33	2	2	0	—		—		—		35	2
Hannover 96	Total		58	4	4	1	0	0	0	0	1	0	63	5
Arminia Bielefeld	2000–01	2. Bundesliga	32	2	2	0	—		—		—		34	2
Arminia Bielefeld	2001–02	2. Bundesliga	33	3	2	0	—		—		—		35	3
Arminia Bielefeld	2002–03	Bundesliga	34	3	2	1	—		—		—		36	4
Arminia Bielefeld	Total		99	8	6	1	0	0	0	0	0	0	105	9
Hamburger SV	2003–04	Bundesliga	26	3	1	0	1	0	2 (Note: Appearances in the UEFA Cup)	0	—		30	3
Hamburger SV	2004–05	Bundesliga	19	0	1	0	—		3 (Note: Appearances in the UEFA Intertoto Cup)	0	—		23	0
Hamburger SV	2005–06	Bundesliga	14	0	1	0	—		6 (Note: Appearances in the UEFA Cup and UEFA Intertoto Cup)	0	—		21	0
Hamburger SV	2006–07	Bundesliga	25	1	1	0	2	0	6 (Note: Appearances in the UEFA Champions League)	0	—		34	1
Hamburger SV	2007–08	Bundesliga	32	3	2	0	—		13	0	—		47	3
Hamburger SV	2008–09	Bundesliga	15	2	3	0	—		6	0	—		24	2
Hamburger SV	2009–10	Bundesliga	1	0	0	0	—		0	0	—		1	0
Hamburger SV	Total		132	9	9	0	3	0	36	0	0	0	180	9
Hamburger SV II	2003–04	Regionalliga Nord	1	0	—		—		—		—		1	0
Hamburger SV II	2004–05	Regionalliga Nord	1	0	—		—		—		—		1	0
Hamburger SV II	Total		2	0	—		—		—		—		2	0
Career Total			291	21	19	2	3	0	36	0	1	0	350	23

=== Coaching record ===
As of match played 16 March 2024

Team	From	To	Record					Ref.
Team	From	To	G	W	D	L	Win %	Ref.
VfB Lübeck	14 December 2023	27 December 2023	2	1	0	1	50.00	
VfB Lübeck	12 March 2024	25 March 2024	1	1	0	0	100.00	
Total			3	2	0	1	66.67	—

== Honours ==
Hamburger SV

- DFL-Ligapokal: 2003
- UEFA Intertoto Cup: 2005
