= Benjamin Lauth =

German footballer (born 1981)

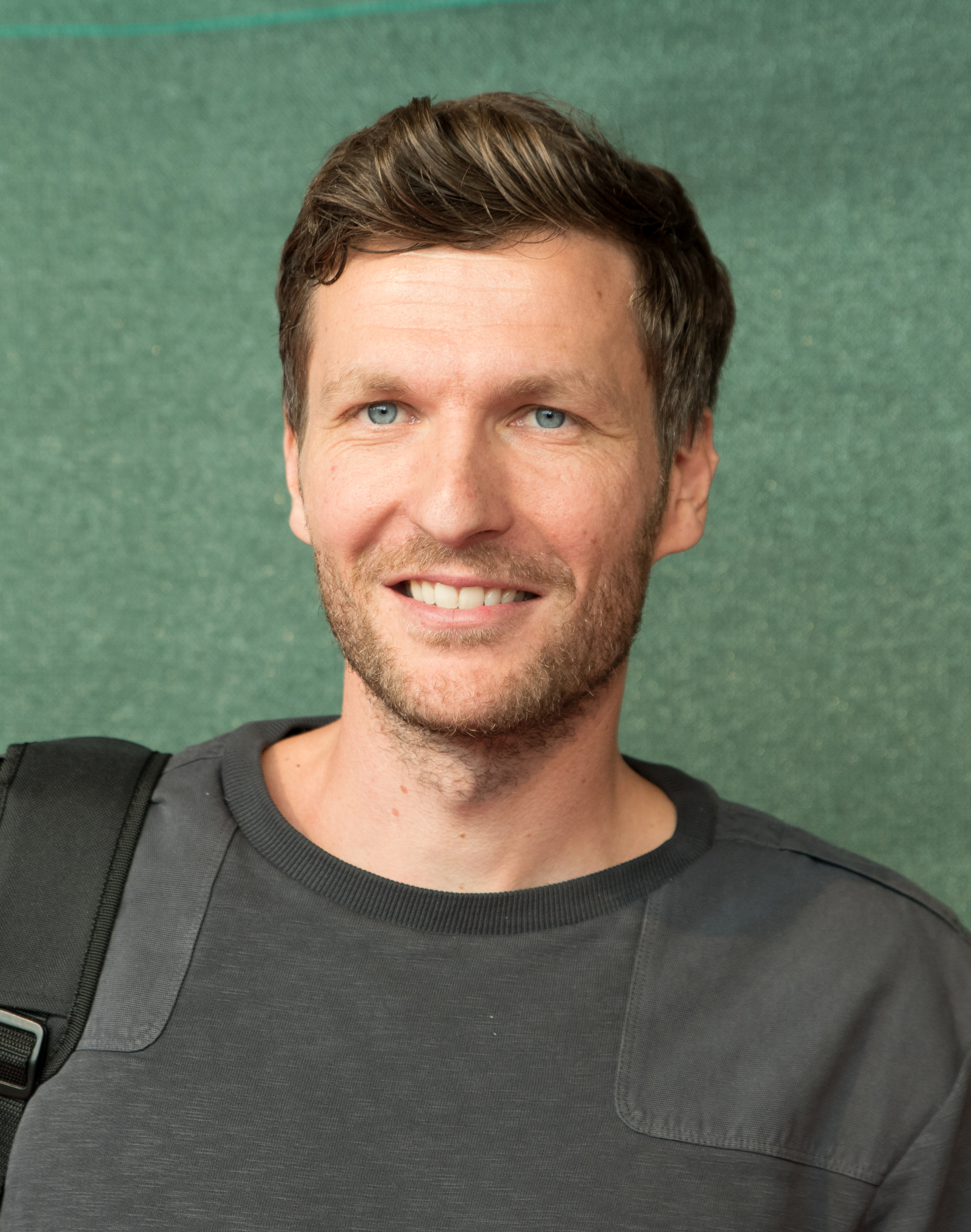
- Lauth in 2016

Personal information
- Date of birth: 4 August 1981 (age 45)
- Place of birth: Hausham, West Germany
- Height: 1.79 m (5 ft 10 in)
- Position: Striker

Youth career
- 1987–1992: Sportfreunde Fischbachau
- 1992–2000: 1860 Munich

Senior career*
Years	Team	Apps	(Gls)
2000–2004	1860 Munich	61	(22)
2004–2007	Hamburger SV	47	(10)
2007	→ VfB Stuttgart (loan)	11	(1)
2007–2008	Hannover 96	21	(0)
2008–2014	1860 Munich	184	(62)
2014–2015	Ferencváros	23	(6)

International career
2000	Germany U18	1	(1)
2002–2003	Germany U21	8	(4)
2003–2004	Germany	5	(0)
- * Club domestic league appearances and goals

Benjamin Lauth (born 4 August 1981) is a German former professional footballer who played as a striker. He is mostly known for his time with 1860 Munich, where he played from 2000 to 2004 and 2008 to 2014.

At international level, he represented Germany at under-18 and under-21 youth levels. He also earned five caps for the senior national team.

== Club career ==
=== 1860 Munich ===
Born in Hausham, Bavaria, Lauth began his career with 1860 Munich in 1992, where he had played in his youth years. He gradually established himself as their leading striker. In 2002, he scored the German Goal of the Year with a bicycle kick.

=== Hamburger SV ===
In 2004, 1860 Munich was relegated, and he moved to Hamburger SV. However, his progress was hampered by a string of nagging injuries, limiting him to only ten appearances in the 2004–05 season. However, he regained his form and earned himself a starting place in the HSV attack for much of the 2005–06 season.

==== VfB Stuttgart (loan) ====
On 25 January 2007, Lauth was loaned to VfB Stuttgart, playing his first Bundesliga game against Arminia Bielefeld on 30 January. That season Stuttgart went on to win the Bundesliga, earning Lauth a medal.

=== Hannover 96 ===
On 3 July 2007, he moved to Hannover 96. At Hannover he played the last 21 of his 140 German top-flight matches.

=== Return to 1860 Munich ===
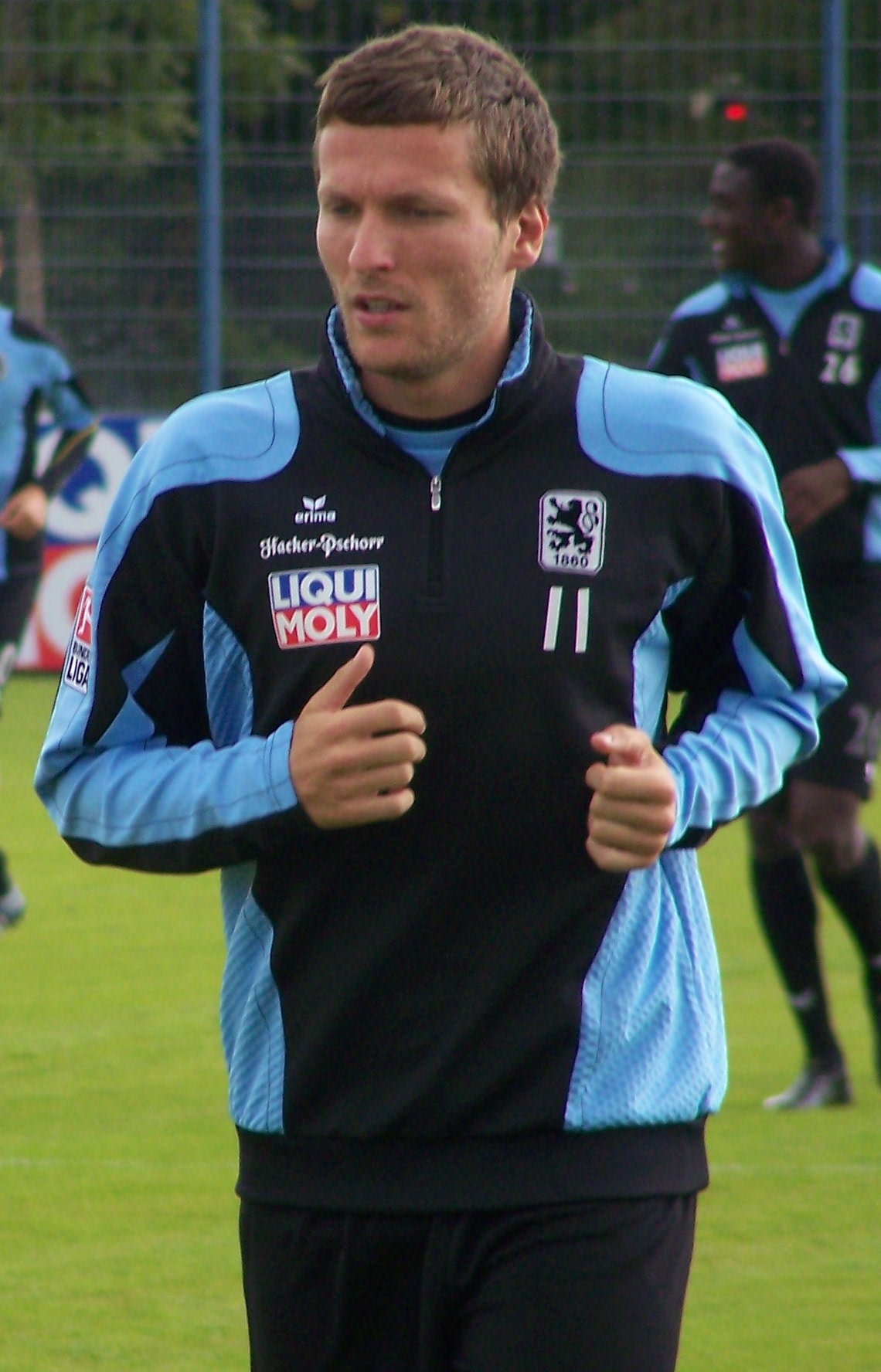
Lauth training with 1860 Munich in 2009

In July 2008, he returned to 1860 Munich.

In December 2012, the German Football Association suspended Lauth for four matches after ruling he had elbowed Marcel Reichwein of VfR Aalen in a 1–1 draw on 30 November.

In April 2014, 1860 Munich decided not to renew his contract. His final goal came against VfL Bochum on 4 May 2014.

In September 2015, Lauth announced his retirement.

== International career ==
Lauth scored one goal in one appearance for the Germany under-18 youth team. For the Germany under-21s, he scored four goals in eight matches.

He made his senior international debut for Germany on 16 December 2002, in a charity match between the national team and a selection of foreign players of the Bundesliga. He scored twice in the 4–2 win. In total, he earned five caps but did not score for "the Mannschaft".

== Personal life ==
Lauth is subject of the song Lauth anhören (a pun of laut anhören, listen loudly) by Sportfreunde Stiller, who are avid Bavarian football fans. Lauth was talented for tennis and skiing, at a young age he was offered the opportunity to go the young German academy for skiing.

== Career statistics ==
Appearances and goals by club, season and competition
Club	Season	League			National cup		League cup		Europe		Total		Ref.
Club	Season	Division	Apps	Goals	Apps	Goals	Apps	Goals	Apps	Goals	Apps	Goals	Ref.
1860 Munich II	2000–01	Regionalliga Süd	28	4	—		—		—		28	4	
1860 Munich	2001–02	Bundesliga	1	0	0	0	—		0	0	1	0	
1860 Munich	2002–03	Bundesliga	32	13	4	2	—		1	0	37	15	
1860 Munich	2003–04	Bundesliga	28	9	2	2	—		—		30	11	
1860 Munich	Total		61	22	6	4	0	0	1	0	68	26	—
Hamburger SV	2004–05	Bundesliga	10	4	1	0	—		0	0	11	1	
Hamburger SV	2005–06	Bundesliga	31	6	3	0	—		16	6	50	12	
Hamburger SV	2006–07	Bundesliga	6	0	1	0	1	0	4	0	12	0	
Hamburger SV	Total		47	10	5	0	1	0	20	6	73	16	—
VfB Stuttgart	2006–07	Bundesliga	11	1	2	0	—		—		13	1	
VfB Stuttgart II	2006–07	Regionalliga Süd	1	0	—		—		—		1	0	
Hannover 96	2007–08	Bundesliga	21	0	2	0	—		—		23	0	
1860 Munich	2008–09	2. Bundesliga	34	15	3	1	—		—		37	16	
1860 Munich	2009–10	2. Bundesliga	30	6	3	0	—		—		33	6	
1860 Munich	2010–11	2. Bundesliga	33	16	2	0	—		—		35	16	
1860 Munich	2011–12	2. Bundesliga	33	11	2	2	—		—		35	13	
1860 Munich	2012–13	2. Bundesliga	30	12	3	1	—		—		33	13	
1860 Munich	2013–14	2. Bundesliga	27	3	2	0	—		—		29	3	
1860 Munich	Total		187	63	15	4	0	0	0	0	202	67	—
Ferencváros	2014–15	Nemzeti Bajnokság I	23	6	3	0	5	3	4	0	35	9	
Career total			379	106	33	8	6	3	25	6	443	123	—

== Honours ==
Hamburger SV

- UEFA Intertoto Cup: 2005

VfB Stuttgart

- Bundesliga: 2006–07
- DFB-Pokal runner-up: 2006–07

Ferencváros

- Hungarian Cup: 2014–15
- Hungarian League Cup: 2014–15

Individual

- Goal of the Year (Germany): 2002
