= Mathias Abel =

German footballer

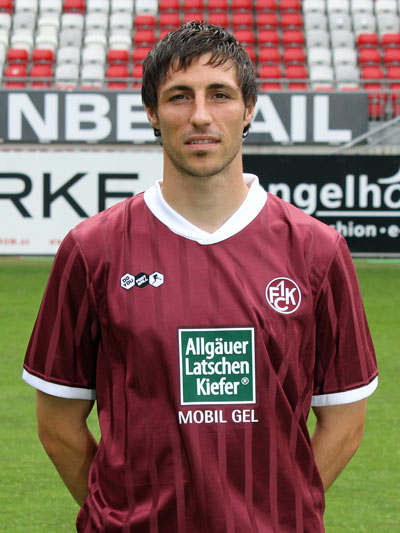
- Abel as a Kaiserslautern player

Personal information
- Date of birth: 22 June 1981 (age 45)
- Place of birth: Kaiserslautern, West Germany
- Height: 1.88 m (6 ft 2 in)
- Position: Defender

Youth career
- 1990–1998: 1. FC Kaiserslautern

Senior career*
Years	Team	Apps	(Gls)
1998–2000	Eintracht Bad Kreuznach		
2000–2001	Borussia Dortmund II	12	(0)
2002–2005	Mainz 05	65	(4)
2005–2008	Schalke 04	1	(0)
2005–2006	→ Mainz 05 (loan)	20	(0)
2007	→ Hamburger SV (loan)	7	(0)
2008–2010	1. FC Kaiserslautern II	20	(2)
2008–2013	1. FC Kaiserslautern	48	(2)
Total		173	(8)

International career
2003	Germany U21	1	(0)
- * Club domestic league appearances and goals

Mathias Abel (born 22 June 1981) is a German retired footballer who played as a defender.

== Football career ==
Abel was born in Kaiserslautern, Rhineland-Palatinate. After starting with amateurs Eintracht Bad Kreuznach and having a spell with Borussia Dortmund's reserves, he joined 1. FSV Mainz 05 in 2002, helping the club promote from the second division in his second year with 18 matches.

Abel made his Bundesliga debut on 14 August 2004, in a 2–1 home win over Hamburger SV. He scored three goals during the season, as his team maintained its status.

From 2006 onwards, Abel would appear sparingly for several clubs: FC Schalke 04 – which also loaned him for five months to Hamburg – and 1. FC Kaiserslautern, appearing almost exclusively for the latter's B-side during two years. This was mainly due to two consecutive anterior cruciate ligament injuries (in early 2004, he suffered the same injury while at Mainz, being sidelined for six months).

Abel's first appearance for Kaiserslautern's first team only took place on 26 October 2010, as an early substitute in a 3–0 home win against Arminia Bielefeld for the campaign's German Cup. Four days later, he managed to play the full 90 minutes in the league fixture against Borussia Mönchengladbach (same venue and result).

In February 2013 Abel was linked with China League One team Beijing Baxy FC, but nothing came of it. After his contract with Lautern expired in the summer, he went on trial with Brunei DPMM FC of the S.League.

== Career statistics ==
Appearances and goals by club, season and competition
Club	Season	League			National Cup		Other		Total		Ref.
Club	Season	Division	Apps	Goals	Apps	Goals	Apps	Goals	Apps	Goals	Ref.
Borussia Dortmund II	2000–01	Regionalliga Nord	12	0	—		—		12	0	
1. FSV Mainz 05	2002–03	2. Bundesliga	21	1	1	0	—		22	1	
1. FSV Mainz 05	2003–04	2. Bundesliga	18	0	1	0	—		19	0	
1. FSV Mainz 05	2004–05	Bundesliga	24	3	1	0	—		25	3	
1. FSV Mainz 05	2005–06	Bundesliga	20	0	1	0	6 (Note: Appearances in the 2005–06 UEFA Cup)	0	27	0	
1. FSV Mainz 05	Total		83	4	4	0	6	0	93	4	—
FC Schalke 04	2006–07	Bundesliga	1	0	1	0	2 (Note: Appearances in the 2006 DFL-Ligapokal)	0	4	0	
Hamburger SV (loan)	2006–07	Bundesliga	7	0	0	0	—		7	0	
Hamburger SV II (loan)	2006–07	Regionalliga Nord	2	0	—		—		2	0	
1. FC Kaiserslautern II	2008–09	Regionalliga West	4	0	—		—		4	0	
1. FC Kaiserslautern II	2009–10	Regionalliga West	16	2	—		—		16	2	
1. FC Kaiserslautern II	Total		20	2	—		—		20	2	—
1. FC Kaiserslautern	2010–11	Bundesliga	19	2	1	0	—		20	2	
1. FC Kaiserslautern	2011–12	Bundesliga	22	0	2	0	—		24	0	
1. FC Kaiserslautern	2012–13	2. Bundesliga	7	0	1	0	—		8	0	
1. FC Kaiserslautern	Total		48	2	4	0	0	0	52	2	—
Career Total			173	8	9	0	8	0	190	8	—
