= Recep Yıldız =

Turkish footballer

Personal information
- Full name: Recep Yıldız
- Date of birth: 10 March 1986 (age 40)
- Place of birth: Germany
- Height: 1.85 m (6 ft 1 in)
- Position: Centre back

Youth career
- –1995: SKV Freiburg
- 1995–2005: Stuttgart Kickers

Senior career*
Years	Team	Apps	(Gls)
2005–2006	Stuttgart Kickers II	14	(2)
2006–2008	Stuttgart Kickers	50	(4)
2008–2009	Antalyaspor	6	(0)
2009–2011	Adanaspor	53	(1)
2011–2012	Etimesgut Şekerspor	6	(0)
2012	Körfez FK	6	(1)

International career
2007	Turkey U21	1	(0)
- * Club domestic league appearances and goals as of 28 September 2015

Recep Yıldız (born 10 March 1986) is a Turkish professional footballer who last played as a centre back for Körfez FK.
