= Wolfgang Hesl =

German footballer (born 1986)

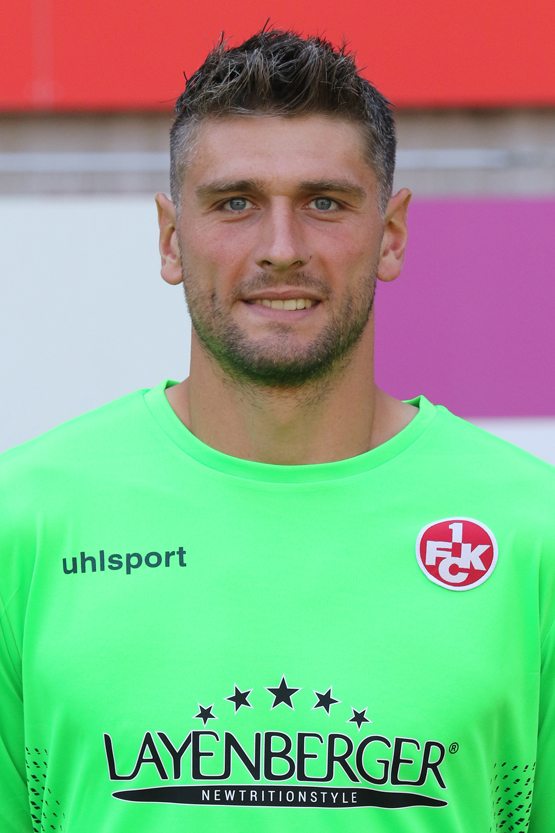
- Hesl with 1. FC Kaiserslautern in 2018

Personal information
- Date of birth: 13 January 1986 (age 40)
- Place of birth: Nabburg, West Germany
- Height: 1.85 m (6 ft 1 in)
- Position: Goalkeeper

Youth career
- SC Altfalter
- 1. FC Schwarzenfeld
- –2004: FC Amberg

Senior career*
| Years | Team | Apps | (Gls) |
| 2004–2011 | Hamburger SV II | 85 | (0) |
| 2004–2011 | Hamburger SV | 2 | (0) |
| 2010–2011 | → SV Ried (loan) | 20 | (0) |
| 2011–2012 | Dynamo Dresden | 13 | (0) |
| 2012–2015 | Greuther Fürth | 78 | (0) |
| 2015–2017 | Arminia Bielefeld | 59 | (0) |
| 2017–2018 | Würzburger Kickers | 13 | (0) |
| 2018–2019 | 1. FC Kaiserslautern | 14 | (0) |
| Total | | 284 | (0) |
- * Club domestic league appearances and goals

Wolfgang Hesl (born 13 January 1986) is a German former professional footballer who played as a goalkeeper.

== Career ==
Hesl joined Hamburger SV in 2004 and was part of the club's first team since the beginning of the 2005–06 season. After making over 70 appearances for the club's reserve team in the Regionalliga, he made his Bundesliga debut for Hamburg on 17 May 2008 in their final league game of the 2007–08 season, a 7–0 win at home to Karlsruhe, coming on as a substitute for Frank Rost in the 74th minute. He also appeared in four UEFA Europa League matches for Hamburg during the 2009–10 season. When Jaroslav Drobný joined Hamburg in the summer of 2010, Hesl would have been only third choice and was therefore loaned out to Austrian side SV Ried for one season. He returned to Hamburger SV at the end of the 2010–11 season, but as he would still have been number three goalkeeper in Hamburg he decided to join Dynamo Dresden.

In 2012, he signed with then promoted Bundesliga club Greuther Fürth where he replaced Max Grün as number one keeper of the club in 2014. Hesl joined the squad of 2. Bundesliga club Arminia Bielefeld in 2015. With the club, he has made 64 appearances in two seasons.

On 11 June 2017, it was announced that Hesl had signed with 3. Liga club Würzburger Kickers until 2019.

Hesl announced his retirement from playing in summer 2019.

== Personal life ==
Hesl is married to Stephanie Ries-Hesl since December 2009.

== Career statistics ==
Appearances and goals by club, season and competition
| Club | Season | League | | | Cup | | Europe | | Other | | Total | |
| Club | Season | Division | Apps | Goals | Apps | Goals | Apps | Goals | Apps | Goalss | Apps | Goals |
|---|---|---|---|---|---|---|---|---|---|---|---|---|
| Hamburger SV II | 2004–05 | Regionalliga Nord | 7 | 0 | — | | — | | — | | 7 | 0 |
| Hamburger SV II | 2005–06 | Regionalliga Nord | 31 | 0 | — | | — | | — | | 31 | 0 |
| Hamburger SV II | 2006–07 | Regionalliga Nord | 32 | 0 | — | | — | | — | | 32 | 0 |
| Hamburger SV II | 2007–08 | Regionalliga Nord | 4 | 0 | — | | — | | — | | 4 | 0 |
| Hamburger SV II | 2008–09 | Regionalliga Nord | 8 | 0 | — | | — | | — | | 8 | 0 |
| Hamburger SV II | 2009–10 | Regionalliga Nord | 2 | 0 | — | | — | | – | | 2 | 0 |
| Hamburger SV II | 2010–11 | Regionalliga Nord | 1 | 0 | — | | — | | — | | 1 | 0 |
| Hamburger SV II | Total | | 85 | 0 | — | | — | | — | | 85 | 0 |
| Hamburger SV | 2005–06 | Bundesliga | 0 | 0 | 0 | 0 | 0 | 0 | — | | 0 | 0 |
| Hamburger SV | 2006–07 | Bundesliga | 0 | 0 | 0 | 0 | 0 | 0 | — | | 0 | 0 |
| Hamburger SV | 2007–08 | Bundesliga | 1 | 0 | 0 | 0 | 0 | 0 | — | | 1 | 0 |
| Hamburger SV | 2008–09 | Bundesliga | 0 | 0 | 0 | 0 | 0 | 0 | — | | 0 | 0 |
| Hamburger SV | 2009–10 | Bundesliga | 1 | 0 | 0 | 0 | 4 | 0 | — | | 5 | 0 |
| Hamburger SV | Total | | 2 | 0 | 0 | 0 | 4 | 0 | — | | 6 | 0 |
| SV Ried (loan) | 2010–11 | Austrian Bundesliga | 20 | 0 | 2 | 0 | — | | — | | 22 | 0 |
| Dynamo Dresden | 2011–12 | 2. Bundesliga | 13 | 0 | 1 | 0 | — | | — | | 14 | 0 |
| Greuther Fürth | 2012–13 | Bundesliga | 17 | 0 | 0 | 0 | — | | — | | 17 | 0 |
| Greuther Fürth | 2013–14 | 2. Bundesliga | 34 | 0 | 2 | 0 | — | | 2 | 0 | 38 | 0 |
| Greuther Fürth | 2014–15 | 2. Bundesliga | 27 | 0 | 0 | 0 | — | | — | | 27 | 0 |
| Greuther Fürth | Total | | 78 | 0 | 2 | 0 | — | | 2 | 0 | 82 | 0 |
| Arminia Bielefeld | 2015–16 | 2. Bundesliga | 33 | 0 | 1 | 0 | — | | — | | 34 | 0 |
| Arminia Bielefeld | 2016–17 | 2. Bundesliga | 26 | 0 | 4 | 0 | — | | — | | 30 | 0 |
| Arminia Bielefeld | Total | | 59 | 0 | 5 | 0 | — | | — | | 64 | 0 |
| Würzburger Kickers | 2017–18 | 3. Liga | 13 | 0 | 1 | 0 | — | | — | | 14 | 0 |
| 1. FC Kaiserslautern | 2018–19 | 3. Liga | 14 | 0 | 0 | 0 | — | | — | | 14 | 0 |
| Career total | | | 284 | 0 | 11 | 0 | 4 | 0 | 2 | 0 | 301 | 0 |
