= Timo Kunert =

German footballer

Personal information
- Date of birth: 12 March 1987 (age 39)
- Place of birth: Gladbeck, West Germany
- Height: 1.76 m (5 ft 9 in)
- Position: Midfielder

Team information
- Current team: FSV Frankfurt
- Number: 2

Youth career
- 1992–1999: VfB Kirchhellen
- 1999–2006: Schalke 04

Senior career*
Years	Team	Apps	(Gls)
2005–2007	Schalke 04 II	26	(4)
2006–2007	Schalke 04	1	(0)
2007–2009	Hamburger SV II	26	(2)
2007–2009	Hamburger SV	0	(0)
2009–2011	Sportfreunde Lotte	52	(0)
2011–2012	Rot-Weiß Oberhausen	20	(0)
2012–2013	Sportfreunde Lotte	16	(0)
2013–2014	VfL Osnabrück	13	(0)
2014–2015	1. FC Saarbrücken	19	(0)
2015	1. FC Saarbrücken II	3	(0)
2016–2019	TSV Steinbach	97	(5)
2019–	FSV Frankfurt	14	(0)

International career
2004–2005	Germany U-18	3	(0)
2005–2006	Germany U-19	13	(2)
2006	Germany U-20	1	(0)
- * Club domestic league appearances and goals as of 21:27, 12 January 2021 (UTC)

Timo Kunert (born 12 March 1987 in Gladbeck) is a German footballer who currently plays for FSV Frankfurt.

== Career ==
Kunert began his career 1992 with VfB Kirchhellen and joined than 1999 to Schalke 04, who has played seven years in the youth, before promoted to first team in January 2006.

He made his debut in the Bundesliga on 7 April 2007 for Schalke 04, when he came on as a substitute for Mesut Özil in the 90th minute of a game against Borussia Mönchengladbach. Kunert left FC Schalke 04 then after eight years in summer 2007 and signed with Hamburger SV. After two years with Hamburger SV he returned to Nordrhein-Westfalen and signed for Sportfreunde Lotte in summer 2009. On 14 April 2009, he had a trial at Rot-Weiß Oberhausen.

== Honours ==
- Bundesliga runner-up: 2006–07

== Early life ==
Kunert attended the Gesamtschule Berger Feld.
