= Oliver Hampel =

German footballer

Personal information
- Date of birth: 2 March 1985 (age 41)
- Place of birth: Wolfen, East Germany
- Height: 1.71 m (5 ft 7 in)
- Position: Midfielder

Youth career
- TSV 1896 Mühlbeck
- SpVgg Mühlbeck/Friedersdorf
- LSG Löbnitz
- Hallescher FC
- Hertha BSC

Senior career*
| Years | Team | Apps | (Gls) |
| 2003–2004 | Hertha BSC II | 11 | (1) |
| 2004–2005 | Hamburger SV | 0 | (0) |
| 2004–2007 | Hamburger SV II | 52 | (4) |
| 2007–2009 | Fortuna Düsseldorf | 32 | (2) |
| 2008–2009 | Fortuna Düsseldorf II | 16 | (5) |
| 2010 | Sportfreunde Lotte | 8 | (0) |
| 2010–2012 | TuRU Düsseldorf | 62 | (12) |
| 2013 | Fortuna Düsseldorf II | 1 | (0) |
| Total | | 182 | (24) |

International career
| | Germany U-21 | 1 | (0) |
- * Club domestic league appearances and goals

Oliver Hampel (born 2 March 1985) is a German former professional footballer who played as a midfielder.

== Career ==
Hampel was born in Wolfen. He signed in summer 2010 with TuRU Düsseldorf, playing for them until 2012.
