= René Klingbeil =

German footballer

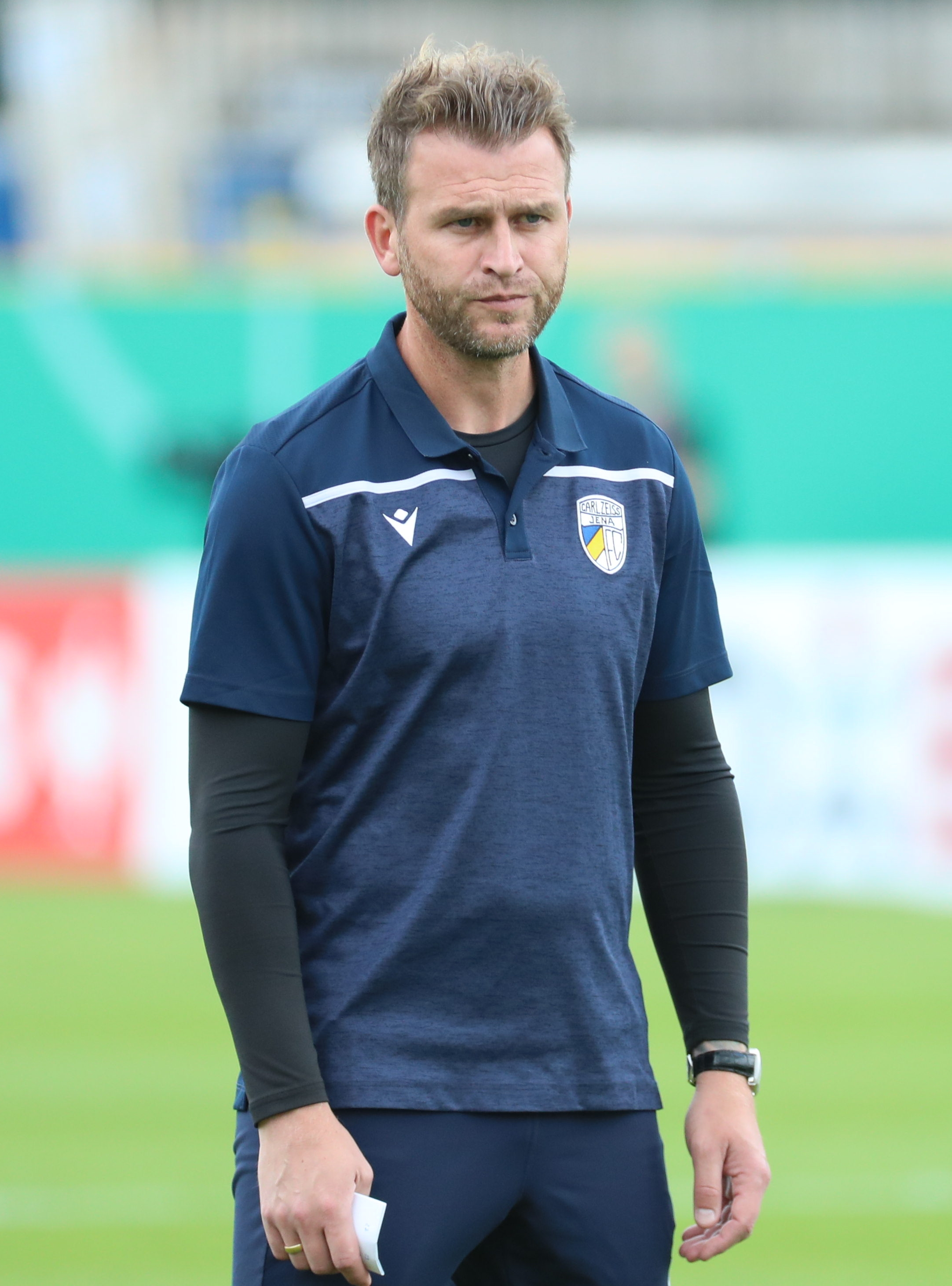
- Klingbell in 2021

Personal information
- Date of birth: 2 April 1981 (age 45)
- Place of birth: Berlin, Germany
- Height: 1.80 m (5 ft 11 in)
- Position: Defender

Team information
- Current team: Hessen Kassel (manager)

Youth career
- 1989–1993: Marzahner SV
- 1993–1998: FC Berlin

Senior career*
Years	Team	Apps	(Gls)
1998–2003	Borussia Mönchengladbach II	52	(2)
2003–2007	Hamburger SV	51	(0)
2003–2007	Hamburger SV II	53	(0)
2007–2008	Viking FK	15	(0)
2008–2015	Erzgebirge Aue	220	(10)
2015	→ Erzgebirge Aue II	1	(0)
2015–2017	Carl Zeiss Jena	65	(2)
Total		437	(14)

Managerial career
- 2017–2019: FC 1910 Lößnitz
- 2019–2020: Carl Zeiss Jena (assistant)
- 2020: Carl Zeiss Jena (caretaker)
- 2020–2022: Carl Zeiss Jena (assistant)
- 2023: Carl Zeiss Jena
- 2024: Wuppertaler SV
- 2024–: Hessen Kassel
- * Club domestic league appearances and goals

René Klingbeil (born 2 April 1981) is a former German football player and current manager of KSV Hessen Kassel.

His first senior club was Borussia Mönchengladbach. He then went on to Hamburger SV. In 2007, he joined Viking FK in Norway. He was released in the summer of 2008 and was offered a contract by Dynamo Dresden but declined their first offer.

== Honours ==
Hamburger SV

- UEFA Intertoto Cup: 2005
