= Alexander Laas =

German footballer

Personal information
- Date of birth: 5 May 1984 (age 42)
- Place of birth: Hamburg, West Germany
- Height: 1.73 m (5 ft 8 in)
- Position: Midfielder

Youth career
- –2000: Niendorfer TSV
- 2000–2002: Hamburger SV

Senior career*
Years	Team	Apps	(Gls)
2002–2007	Hamburger SV II	72	(10)
2003–2007	Hamburger SV	27	(1)
2007–2009	Vfl Wolfsburg	5	(0)
2008–2009	→ Arminia Bielefeld (loan)	3	(1)
2010–2012	RB Leipzig	23	(0)
2012–2013	RB Leipzig II	0	(0)
2014	Niendorfer TSV	8	(0)
Total		138	(12)
- * Club domestic league appearances and goals

Alexander Laas (born 5 May 1984 in Hamburg-Niendorf) is a retired German attacking midfielder. He retired in 2014.

== Honours ==
Hamburger SV

- UEFA Intertoto Cup: 2005
