= Sascha Kirschstein =

German footballer

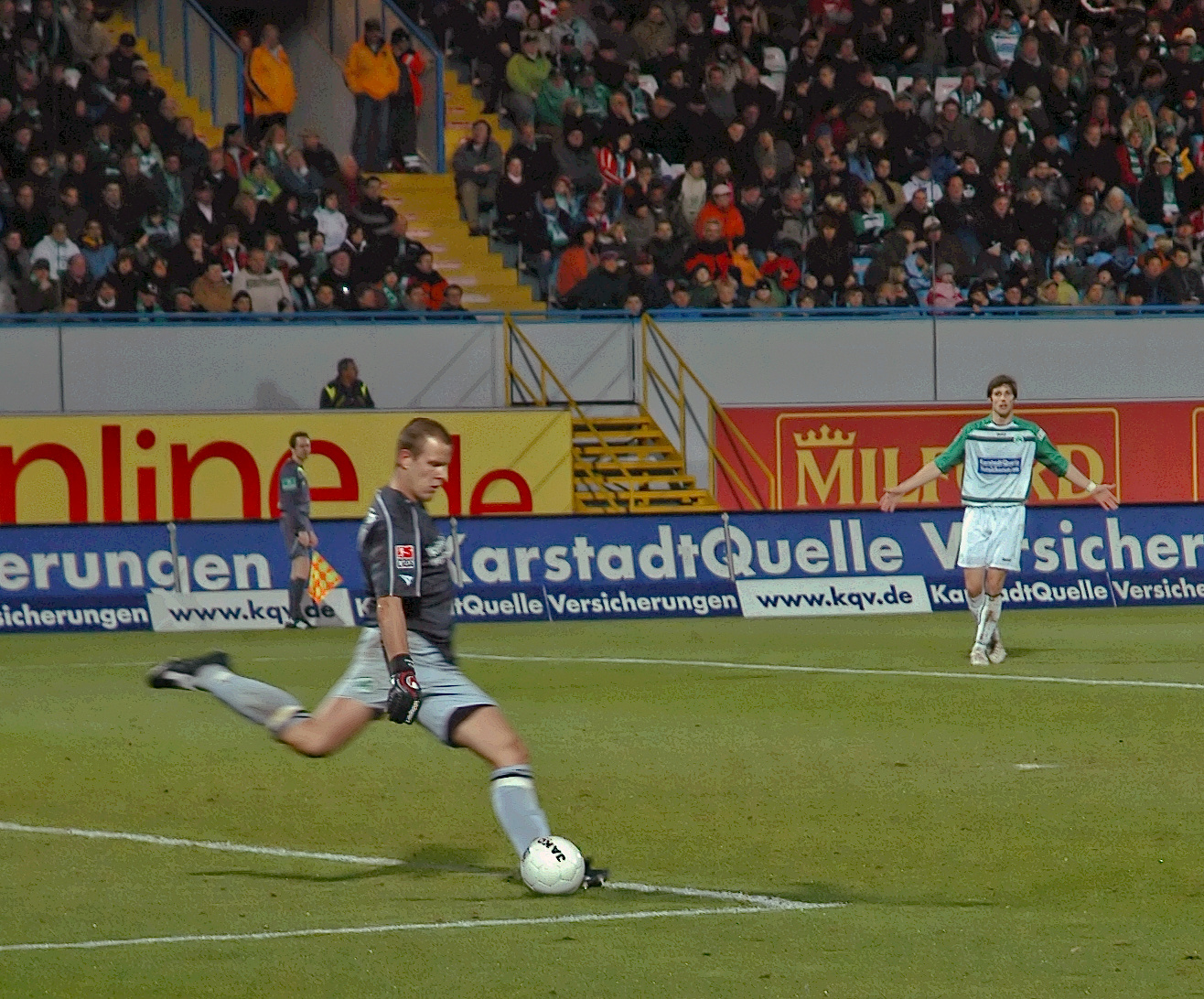
- Kirschstein playing for Greuther Fürth in 2008

Personal information
- Date of birth: 9 June 1980 (age 46)
- Place of birth: Braunschweig, West Germany
- Height: 1.96 m (6 ft 5 in)
- Position: Goalkeeper

Youth career
- 1985–1992: FSB Braunschweig
- 1992–1994: SV Olympia 92 Braunschweig
- 1994–1996: BSC Braunschweig
- 1996–1999: Eintracht Braunschweig

Senior career*
Years	Team	Apps	(Gls)
1999–2002	Eintracht Braunschweig	4	(0)
2002–2004	Rot-Weiss Essen	55	(0)
2004–2006	Hamburger SV II	16	(0)
2004–2009	Hamburger SV	23	(0)
2007–2009	→ Greuther Fürth (loan)	41	(0)
2009–2010	Rot-Weiss Ahlen	33	(0)
2010–2013	FC Ingolstadt 04	49	(0)
2013–2015	Erzgebirge Aue	14	(0)
2015–2016	Poli Timișoara	20	(0)
2017	Rot Weiss Ahlen	15	(0)
Total		270	(0)
- * Club domestic league appearances and goals

Sascha Kirschstein (born 9 June 1980) is a German former professional footballer who played as a goalkeeper.

== Career ==
Born in Braunschweig, Kirschstein started his professional career with Eintracht Braunschweig, making his debut in the Regionalliga North in December 2001. He moved to the league rivals Rot-Weiss Essen in the summer of 2002 and subsequently spent two seasons with club as their first-choice goalkeeper.

In 2004, Kirschstein was signed by Bundesliga side Hamburger SV to serve as understudy to Martin Pieckenhagen and Stefan Wächter. He did not play in the Bundesliga during his first season with the club, but made 12 Regionalliga Nord appearances for Hamburg's reserve team. Kirschstein eventually made his Bundesliga debut against Bayer Leverkusen on 26 November 2005, following an injury to Wächter, and secured his place in the starting XI with a string of impressive performances in the second half of the season. He was initially chosen as Hamburg's first-choice goalkeeper for the 2006–07 season and also made his UEFA Champions League debut against Arsenal on 13 September 2006. However, he was sent off only 10 minutes into the game. Despite that, he remained Hamburg's first choice in the Bundesliga and made two more Champions League appearances, before eventually being replaced by Wächter in early November 2006.

During the winter break of the 2006–07 season, Hamburg signed Frank Rost as their new first-choice goalkeeper and Kirschstein was eventually sent on a two-season loan to 2. Bundesliga side Greuther Fürth in the summer of 2007. At Greuther Fürth, he established himself as the first-choice goalkeeper and only missed one league match during the entire season due to a yellow-card suspension.

On 4 April 2009, he signed a contract with SC Paderborn 07. On 24 June 2009, the contract was canceled and he signed a one-year contract for Rot-Weiss Ahlen. When Ahlen were relegated in 2010, he signed for FC Ingolstadt 04 on 19 May 2010.

Kirschstein retired in 2018, having been released by Rot Weiss Ahlen.

== Honours ==
Hamburger SV

- UEFA Intertoto Cup: 2005
