= Mario Fillinger =

German footballer (born 1984)

Personal information
- Full name: Mario Fillinger
- Date of birth: 10 October 1984 (age 42)
- Place of birth: Pirna, East Germany
- Height: 1.84 m (6 ft 0 in)
- Position: Attacking midfielder

Youth career
- Heidenauer Sportverein
- –1996: SG Dresden Striesen
- 1996–2003: Chemnitzer FC

Senior career*
Years	Team	Apps	(Gls)
2003–2005	Chemnitzer FC	47	(10)
2005–2008	Hamburger SV	12	(0)
2008–2010	Hansa Rostock	50	(10)
2008–2010	Hansa Rostock II	1	(0)
2010–2012	FSV Frankfurt	42	(4)
2010–2012	FSV Frankfurt II	1	(0)
2012–2014	FC Rot-Weiß Erfurt	19	(0)
- * Club domestic league appearances and goals as of 21 December 2013

Mario Fillinger (born 10 October 1984) is a German former footballer.
