= Collin Benjamin =

Namibian retired football midfielder (born 1978)

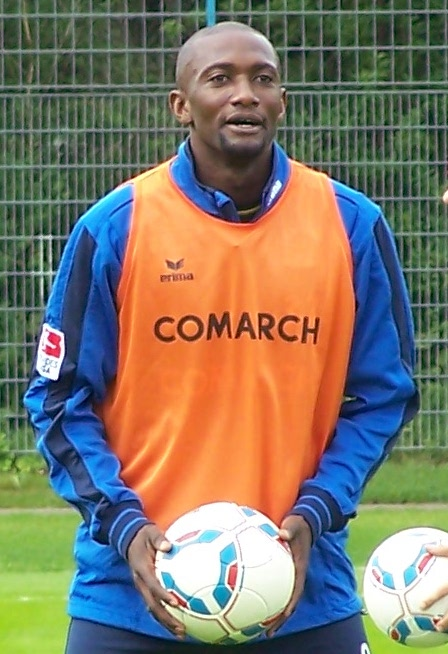
- Benjamin at practice with 1860 Munich in 2011

Personal information
- Date of birth: 3 August 1978 (age 48)
- Place of birth: Windhoek, Namibia
- Height: 1.82 m (6 ft 0 in)
- Position: Defender

Team information
- Current team: Namibia (head coach)

Senior career*
Years	Team	Apps	(Gls)
1996–1999	Civics Windhoek		
1999	TuS Germania Schnelsen	9	(3)
2000	FC Elmshorn 1920	28	(4)
2001–2011	Hamburger SV	146	(13)
2011–2012	1860 Munich	18	(0)

International career
1999–2012	Namibia	32	(2)

Managerial career
- 2018–2021: Namibia (assistant)
- 2022–: Namibia
Medal record
Men's football
Representing Namibia
COSAFA Cup
Runner-up	1999 Southern Africa
- * Club domestic league appearances and goals

Collin Benjamin (born 3 August 1978) is a Namibian professional football coach and a former player who played as a midfielder. He is the head coach of the Namibia national football team. He spent most of his professional career with Hamburger SV while representing Namibia at international level.

== Career ==
Benjamin represented Namibia at the 2008 African Cup of Nations, earning 32 caps; he captained the team for several years. Benjamin was known for his speed and was mainly used for wing play as a defender.

He was named as the head coach of the Namibia national team in June 2022, succeeding Bobby Samaria.Shina Oludare (15 June 2022). "Collin Benjamin: Ex- Hamburger SV defender named as new Namibia coach". Goal.com.

After his 10 years at Hamburg Benjamin ended his playing career in Germany at 1860 Munich, where he then spent time in the club's coaching set-up.

Benjamin, who won 41 caps for Namibia and captained his country, said he was up to the "daunting" challenge of coaching the Brave Warriors - but would require "resources to accomplish the task ahead" of him.

Namibia began their 2023 Africa Cup of Nations qualifying campaign with a 1–1 draw against Burundi in neutral Johannesburg earlier in June 2022.

Aside from representing Hamburg and 1860 Munich during his active days, Benjamin remains the only Namibian to play in the Uefa Champions League.

== Managerial statistics ==
As of 16 November 2026

Team	From	To	Record							
Team	From	To	G	W	D	L	GF	GA	GD	Win %
Namibia	14 June 2022	Present	51	12	17	22	35	63	−28	23.53

Note: win or lose by penalty shoot-out is counted as the draw in time.

== Honours ==
Hamburger SV

- DFB-Ligapokal: 2003

Namibia

- COSAFA Cup: Runner-up, 1999
