= Timothée Atouba =

Cameroonian footballer (born 1982)

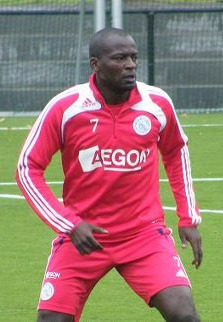
- Atouba with Ajax

Personal information
- Full name: Timothée Atouba Essama
- Date of birth: 17 February 1982 (age 44)
- Place of birth: Douala, Cameroon
- Height: 1.91 m (6 ft 3 in)
- Position: Left back

Youth career
- 1996–1999: Mineduc

Senior career*
Years	Team	Apps	(Gls)
1998–1999	Mineduc	24	(11)
1999–2000	Union Douala	16	(4)
2000–2002	Neuchâtel Xamax	46	(2)
2002–2004	FC Basel	72	(3)
2004–2005	Tottenham Hotspur	18	(1)
2005–2009	Hamburger SV	83	(1)
2009–2011	Ajax	1	(0)
2012–2014	Las Palmas	8	(1)

International career
1999–2008	Cameroon	44	(0)
Medal record
Men's football
Representing Cameroon
Africa Cup of Nations
Winner	2000 Ghana-Nigeria
Runner-up	2008 Ghana
FIFA Confederations Cup
Runner-up	2003 France
- * Club domestic league appearances and goals

Timothée Atouba Essama (born 17 February 1982) is a Cameroonian former professional footballer who played as a left back.

== Club career ==
=== Early years ===
Born in Douala, Cameroon, Atouba grew up in a family with 13 children. He started playing football in Yaoundé in a small club called Minéduc (Ministère de l'éducation national). He was soon being courted by other academies. But he remained with his club, which has since been renamed from to Ouragan FC. He advanced to their first team for the 1999 season, in the second tier. The left footed midfielder played immediately in the starting eleven and was regular goal scorer. From that moment on things went in quick succession and he transferred to Union Douala, in the Elite One. Then, Atouba received a call-up for Cameroon's national team from national coach Pierre Lechantre. He didn't have to play any youth internationals.

=== Neuchâtel Xamax ===
Atouba was spotted as a talent by scouts in friendlies and during Africa Cup of Nations qualifiers. Sooner or later he also became the focus of Swiss clubs. Neuchâtel Xamax was the first club interested. In summer 2000 he signed for them, and played for them in the 2001–02 Nationalliga A under head coach Alain Geiger. Atouba played his league debut for the club in the home game in the Stade de la Maladière (1924) on 19 July 2000 as Xamax won 2–0 against FC Basel. From this moment FCB also became aware of him.

=== Basel ===
In summer 2001, Basel's first offer was turned down, but six months later, the second offer was accepted. Atouba joined Basel's first team as a left-back during their 2001–02 season under head coach Christian Gross for the transfer fee of CHF 400,000. After playing in two test games, Atouba played his domestic league debut for his new club in the away game in the Stadio Cornaredo on 24 February 2002 as Basel won 5–2 against Lugano. He scored his first goal for his new team on 1 April in the away game in the Charmilles Stadium as Basel won 2–1 against Servette. Basel won the last game of the season, on 8 May 2002, and became champions ten points clear at the top of the table. Just four days later they played in the cup final against Grasshopper Club winning 2–1 in extra time they won the double.

Basel's 2002–03 UEFA Champions League season started in the second qualifying round. After beating Žilina 4–1 on aggregate and Celtic on the away goals rule after a 3–3 aggregate, Basel advanced to the group stage. They ended this in second position behind Valencia, but ahead of Liverpool and Spartak Moscow to advance to the next round. Matchday six was decisive. Basel were in second place in the group table, but their place in the last 16 was all but secured - all they had to do was to make sure they did not lose to Liverpool in the last game of the first group stage. The game began for Liverpool in the worst possible manner. In the second minute Julio Hernán Rossi and in the 22nd Christian Giménez put Basel two up. Atouba himself put them three up in the 29th minute with his first Champions League goal. Atouba has fond memories of this third goal. Hakan Yakin fired a free kick from the right towards Jerzy Dudek's goal.The ball bounced off the goalie, it came to me, and somehow, I steered it over the line from the corner of the five-yard-line. Then I ran, ran towards the Basler bench, where I slipped and fell on my back, and everyone, everyone came and congratulated me. Liverpool fought back, during the second half they managed to draw level, but the score remained at 3–3 right up until the final whistle. Basel thus qualified for the next round. Basel ended the second group stage in third position behind Manchester United and Juventus, but ahead of Deportivo La Coruña. Atouba played in 12 of these 16 games. Basel ended their league season as runners-up, but in the cup they advanced to the final and here they beat Xamax 6–0 to defend the title. Basel ended their league season as runners-up, but in the cup they advanced to the final and here they beat Xamax 6–0 to defend the title that they had won a season earlier.

As cup winners Basel were qualified for the UEFA Cup first round and here they beat Malatyaspor 3–2 on aggregate due to the silver goal rule. However, in the second round they lost both games against Newcastle United. Atouba played in three of the games. In their 2003–04 league season the team started well, winning their first 13 matches straight out. The first defeat came on matchday 24. Basel won the championship with 26 victories and seven draws, the team had suffered just three away defeats, and obtained 85 points. Atouba played in 30 matches, netting twice. However, in the cup they were eliminated early, in round three.

Atouba commenced the 2004–05 season with Basel, but after just three league games he left the club. During his time with them, he played a total of 113 games for Basel scoring a total of six goals. 73 of these games were in the Swiss Super League, nine in the Swiss Cup, 14 in the UEFA competitions (Champions League and UEFA Cup) and 17 were friendly games. He scored three goals in the domestic league, one in the cup, one in the European games and the other was scored during the test games.

=== Tottenham Hotspur ===
Atouba signed for Tottenham Hotspur in August 2004. Although he played promising games in his first few months at the club, scoring the only goal in a win at Newcastle United, he finished the season as an occasional left-back. After only one year in London he was deemed surplus to requirements.

=== Hamburger SV ===
Atouba was transferred to Hamburger SV in July 2005. In 2006, Atouba caused a stir after several rash challenges led to goals against his German club in the Champions League. After receiving some jeering from a disgruntled crowd he reacted by raising his middle finger to them, and asking to be substituted. Having been substituted he repeated his actions and then received a red card. In the summer of 2009, Atouba's contract in Hamburg ended.

=== Ajax ===
In July 2009, he moved to Amsterdam, where he was reunited with ex-HSV-coach Martin Jol. He joined AFC Ajax on a two-year deal. After injury problems during 2009, Atouba lost his place in the first eleven to Ajax-youngster Vurnon Anita.

=== Las Palmas ===
In May 2012, Atouba was invited to a trial by the MLS expansion team, the Montreal Impact. In November 2012, the Spanish team UD Las Palmas confirmed the signing of Atouba until the end of season 2012–13.

== International career ==
He was part of the Cameroonian 2004 African Nations Cup team, who finished top of their group in the first round of competition, before failing to secure qualification for the semi-finals.

== Honours ==
FC Basel

- Swiss Super League: 2001–02, 2003–04, 2004–05
- Swiss Cup: 2001–02, 2002–03,
- Uhren Cup: 2003

Hamburger SV

- UEFA Intertoto Cup: 2005, 2007
- Dubai Challenge Cup: 2007, 2008
- Emirates Cup: 2008
- T-Home Cup: 2009

Ajax

- Eredivisie: 2010–11
- KNVB Cup: 2009–10

Cameroon

- African Cup of Nations: 2000; runner-up, 2008
- FIFA Confederations Cup: runner up, 2003

== Sources ==
- Rotblau: Jahrbuch Saison 2017/2018. Publisher: FC Basel Marketing AG. ISBN 978-3-7245-2189-1
- Die ersten 125 Jahre. Publisher: Josef Zindel im Friedrich Reinhardt Verlag, Basel. ISBN 978-3-7245-2305-5
- Verein "Basler Fussballarchiv" Homepage
