= Mišo Brečko =

Slovenian footballer (born 1984)

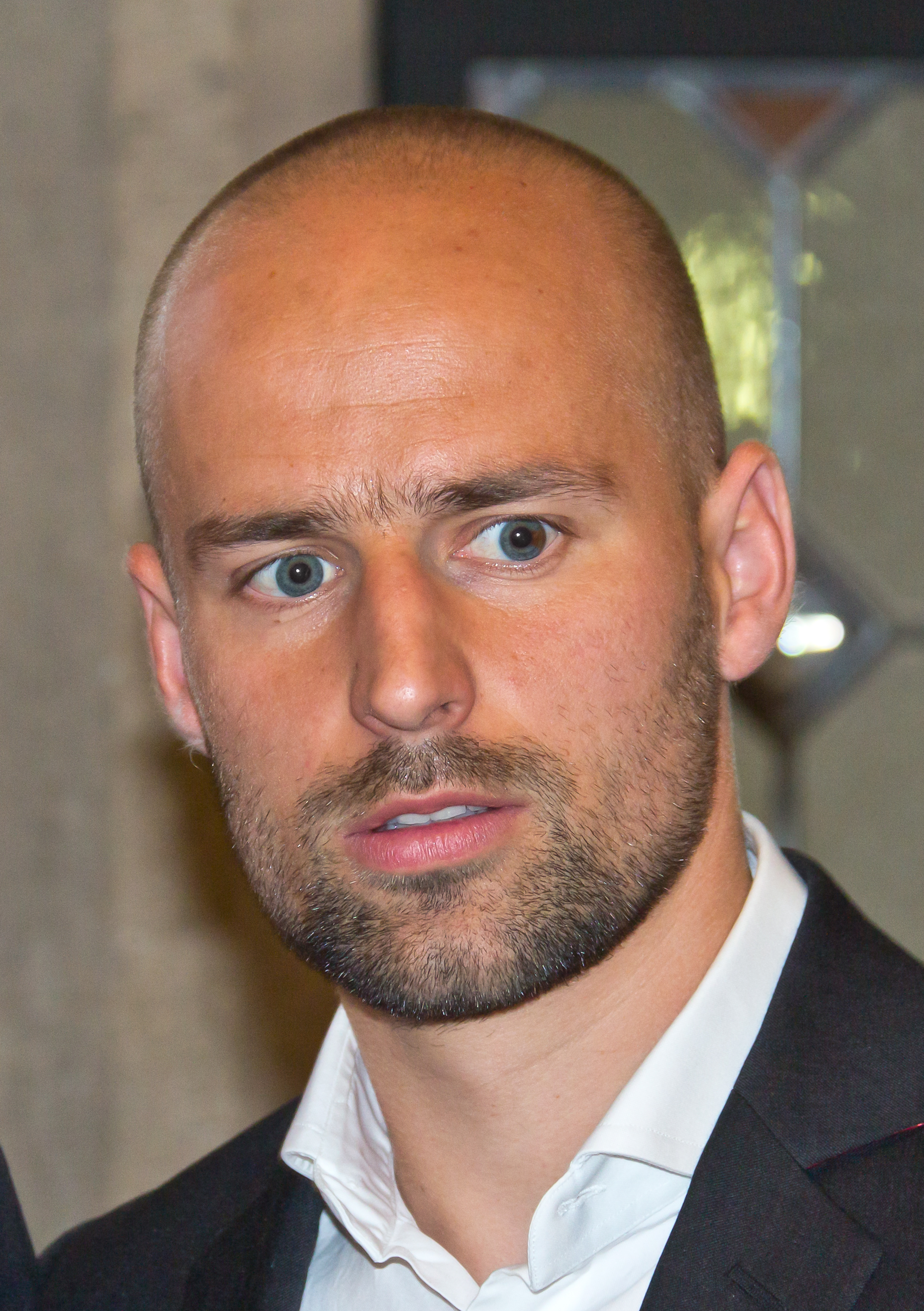
- Brečko in 2014

Personal information
- Date of birth: 1 May 1984 (age 42)
- Place of birth: Trbovlje, SR Slovenia, Yugoslavia
- Height: 1.78 m (5 ft 10 in)
- Position: Right-back

Youth career
- Rudar Trbovlje
- –2003: Factor

Senior career*
Years	Team	Apps	(Gls)
2002–2003	Factor	8	(0)
2003–2004	Šmartno ob Paki	21	(0)
2004–2007	Hamburger SV II	6	(0)
2004–2008	Hamburger SV	21	(0)
2005–2006	→ Hansa Rostock (loan)	24	(1)
2006–2007	→ Erzgebirge Aue (loan)	14	(1)
2008–2015	1. FC Köln	206	(5)
2015–2018	1. FC Nürnberg	66	(0)
Total		366	(7)

International career
2001	Slovenia U17	1	(0)
2003–2004	Slovenia U20	3	(0)
2004–2006	Slovenia U21	15	(0)
2004–2015	Slovenia	77	(0)

Managerial career
- 2022: Slovenia U16
- 2022–2023: Slovenia U17
- 2023–2024: Slovenia U16
- 2024–2026: Slovenia U19
- 2026: Olimpija Ljubljana
- * Club domestic league appearances and goals

Mišo Brečko (Slovene pronunciation: [ˈmíːʃɔ ˈbréːtʃkɔ]; born 1 May 1984) is a Slovenian professional football manager and former player. He played as a right-back.

Brečko spent most of his career in Germany, most notably with 1. FC Köln. At international level, he made 77 appearances for the Slovenia national team, also participating at the 2010 FIFA World Cup.

== Club career ==
Born in Trbovlje, Brečko started his career at Rudar Trbovlje youth sides. During his time at high school, he played few games for Factor in Slovenian Third League. In the 2003–04 season he made 21 appearances for Šmartno in the PrvaLiga. In July 2004 he joined Hamburger SV. He made seven appearances in his first season. In the 2005–06 season he was loaned to Hansa Rostock. In the next season (2006–07), he was loaned to FC Erzgebirge Aue. After two successful seasons in 2. Bundesliga, he played 14 games for HSV during 2007–08 season. He joined 1. FC Köln on free transfer in summer 2008, signing a three-year deal. In 2010 the contract was extended until 2013.

== International career ==
Brečko's first international experience came at the youth level, playing for the Slovenian under-16, under-17, under-20 and under-21 teams between 2000 and 2006. He made his senior international debut in a friendly match against Slovakia on 17 November 2004 in Trnava.

Brečko represented Slovenia at the 2010 FIFA World Cup and made 77 international appearances.
