= David Jarolím =

Czech footballer and manager (born 1979)

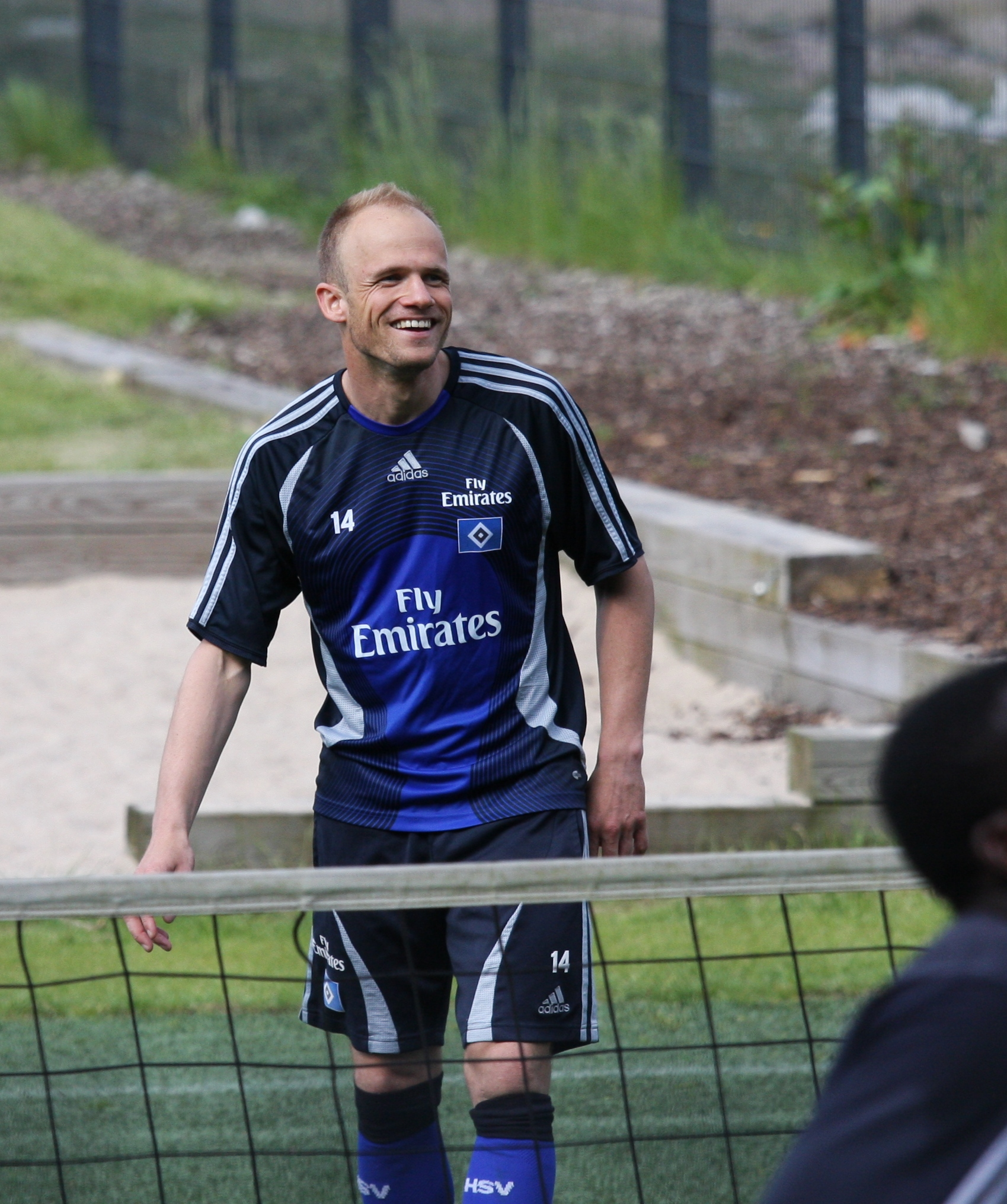
- Jarolím during practice with Hamburg in 2008.

Personal information
- Full name: David Jarolím
- Date of birth: 17 May 1979 (age 47)
- Place of birth: Čáslav, Czechoslovakia
- Height: 1.74 m (5 ft 9 in)
- Position: Central midfielder

Youth career
- 1987–1991: Rouen
- 1991–1995: Slavia Prague

Senior career*
| Years | Team | Apps | (Gls) |
| 1995–1997 | Slavia Prague | 0 | (0) |
| 1997–2000 | Bayern Munich II | 62 | (12) |
| 1997–2000 | Bayern Munich | 1 | (0) |
| 2000–2003 | 1. FC Nürnberg | 69 | (4) |
| 2003–2012 | Hamburger SV | 257 | (14) |
| 2012 | Evian | 5 | (0) |
| 2013–2014 | Mladá Boleslav | 28 | (1) |
| Total | | 434 | (32) |

International career
| 1999–2002 | Czech Republic U21 | 11 | (2) |
| 2005–2009 | Czech Republic | 29 | (1) |

Managerial career
- 2018–2019: Olympia Radotín
- 2019: Rakovník
- 2020: Slavoj Vyšehrad (youth)
- 2020–2022: Ústí nad Labem
- 2025–2026: Arsenal Česká Lípa
- * Club domestic league appearances and goals

David Jarolím (Czech pronunciation: [ˈdavɪt ˈjaroliːm]; born 17 May 1979) is a Czech football manager and former player. A central midfielder by position, Jarolím was known for his stamina, passing and technical skill.

== Club career ==
Born in Čáslav, Czechoslovakia, Jarolím began his professional career with SK Slavia Praha before transferring to German club Bayern Munich while still a teenager. Although he spent three seasons with the German giants, from 1997 to 2000, he played in only one competitive match with the first team squad.

Jarolím transferred to second division club 1. FC Nürnberg before the 2000–01 season, and played in nine matches during their promotion campaign. During the 2001–02 season, Jarolím established himself as a key player in the Nürnberg squad, attracting the attention of other top clubs.

Following Nürnberg's relegation after the 2002–03 season, an agreement was reached for Jarolím's transfer to Hamburger SV at the close of the 2003–04 season. However, just before the close of the transfer window in September 2003, the deal was brought forward, allowing Jarolím to play for Hamburg during that season. Jarolím has been an important member of Hamburg's first team squad ever since. After Rafael van der Vaart joined Real Madrid, he took over as team captain.

== International career ==
A former Czech U-21 international, Jarolím made his senior debut for the reformed Czech Republic national team on 8 October 2005. He was selected for the 2006 FIFA World Cup but did not see much playing time. During Euro 2008 qualifying he was regularly used as a substitute, making only one start, but did manage a goal in the 7–0 thrashing of San Marino. He played in all three matches at the tournament but the Czechs failed to progress past the group stage.

== Personal life ==
Jarolím's father Karel, former coach of Czech Republic. national team, is also a former Slavia player and Czechoslovakia international. David's older brother Lukáš and cousin Marek Jarolím are also professional players.

== Coaching and managerial career ==
After retiring at the end of the 2013–14 season, Jarolím was appointed sporting director of Mladá Boleslav. On 25 September 2019 it was confirmed, that Jarolím had been appointed manager of Olympia Radotín. He left the club at the end of the season. On 28 September 2019, he was then appointed manager of SK Rakovník. However, after only nine days in charge, it was announced that his contract had been terminated by mutual agreement for personal reasons.

In January 2020, Jarolím was hired as U19 manager of FC Slavoj Vyšehrad.

In December 2020, Jarolím signed a contract with Ústí nad Labem until 2024.

On 22 September 2025, Jarolím was appointed as manager of Arsenal Česká Lípa.

== Career statistics ==
As of match played 14 October 2009.

Czech Republic national team
| Year | Apps | Goals |
|---|---|---|
| 2005 | 1 | 0 |
| 2006 | 7 | 1 |
| 2007 | 5 | 0 |
| 2008 | 9 | 0 |
| 2009 | 7 | 0 |
| Total | 29 | 1 |

As of match played 7 October 2006.

| No. | Date | Venue | Opponent | Score | Result | Competition | Ref. |
|---|---|---|---|---|---|---|---|
| 1. | 7 October 2006 | U Nisy Stadion, Liberec, Czech Republic | San Marino | 5–0 | 7–0 | UEFA Euro 2008 qualification | |

== Honours ==
Bayern Munich

- UEFA Champions League finalist: 1998–99
- Bundesliga: 1998–99, 1999–2000
- DFB-Pokal: 1997–98, 1999–2000; runner-up 1998–99
- DFB-Ligapokal: 1999

Hamburger SV

- UEFA Intertoto Cup: 2005
