= Volker Schmidt =

German footballer

Personal information
- Full name: Volker Schmidt
- Date of birth: 22 September 1978 (age 48)
- Place of birth: Hamburg, West Germany
- Height: 1.78 m (5 ft 10 in)
- Position: Centre back

Youth career
- 1983–1988: Jahn Wilhelmsburg
- 1988–1991: HNT Hausbruch-Neugraben
- 1991–1997: HT 16 Hamburg

Senior career*
Years	Team	Apps	(Gls)
1997–2010	Hamburger SV II	272	(1)
2005–2007	Hamburger SV	3	(0)
Total		275	(1)

Managerial career
- 2010–: Hamburger SV U-17 (Assistant coach)
- * Club domestic league appearances and goals

Volker Schmidt (born 22 September 1978 in Hamburg) is a German former football player who last played for Hamburger SV.

== Career ==
Schmidt played in the youth side for Jahn Wilhelmsburg, HNT Hausbruch-Neugraben and HT 16 Hamburg. In summer 1991 left he HT 16 Hamburg and signed for Hamburger SV who was 2005 promoted to the seniorside On 28 May 2010 announced his retirement.

== Coaching career ==
After his retirement will begin to work on 1 July 2010 as Assistant coach in the U-17 team by his last club Hamburger SV.

== Personal life ==
Schmidt who was born in Hamburg grew up in Wilhelmsburg and Neu Wiedental, he marked his Abitur at Gymnasium Süderelbe in Hamburg-Harburg.
