= 2002–03 Hamburger SV season =

Hamburger SV
2002–03 season
- Manager: Kurt Jara
- Bundesliga: 4th
- DFB-Pokal: Last 16
- Top goalscorer: League: Bernardo Romeo (14); All: Bernardo Romeo (16)
Home colours	Away colours	Third colours

Hamburger SV nearly qualified for the Champions League, only just falling short to Borussia Dortmund. Given that HSV had been mired in the midfield for the last few seasons, the season was regarded as a successful one.

== Players ==
=== First-team squad ===
Squad at end of season

Note: Flags indicate national team as defined under FIFA eligibility rules; some limited exceptions apply. Players may hold more than one non-FIFA nationality.

No.	Pos.	Nation	Player
1	GK	GER	Martin Pieckenhagen
2	DF	GER	Marcel Maltritz
3	MF	GER	Christian Rahn
4	DF	GER	Ingo Hertzsch
5	DF	NED	Nico-Jan Hoogma
6	MF	SUI	Raphaël Wicky
7	MF	GER	Martin Groth
8	DF	AUT	Michael Baur
9	FW	ARG	Bernardo Romeo
11	FW	NED	Erik Meijer
12	DF	DEN	Lars Jacobsen
13	FW	DEN	Kim Christensen
14	MF	BIH	Sergej Barbarez

No.	Pos.	Nation	Player
15	MF	IRI	Mehdi Mahdavikia
16	MF	NAM	Collin Benjamin
17	MF	AUT	Richard Kitzbichler
18	DF	CZE	Milan Fukal
19	MF	LBN	Roda Antar (Note: Antar was born in Freetown, Sierra Leone, but also qualified to represent Lebanon internationally and represented Lebanon at U-21 level before making his international debut for Lebanon in 1998.) (on loan from Tadamon Sour)
20	MF	GER	Bernd Hollerbach
21	DF	CZE	Tomáš Ujfaluši
22	MF	ARG	Cristian Ledesma
24	DF	GER	Stephan Kling
27	MF	ARG	Rodolfo Cardoso
28	GK	GER	Thomas Hillenbrand
29	GK	GER	Stefan Wächter
32	FW	JPN	Naohiro Takahara

=== Left club during season ===
Note: Flags indicate national team as defined under FIFA eligibility rules; some limited exceptions apply. Players may hold more than one non-FIFA nationality.

No.	Pos.	Nation	Player
10	MF	GER	Jörg Albertz (to Shanghai Shenhua)
23	FW	CZE	Marek Heinz (to Arminia Bielefeld)

No.	Pos.	Nation	Player
30	GK	GER	Carsten Wehlmann (to VfB Lübeck)

== Competitions ==
=== Bundesliga ===
==== League table ====
Pos	Team	Pld	W	D	L	GF	GA	GD	Pts	Qualification or relegation
2	VfB Stuttgart	34	17	8	9	53	39	+14	59	Qualification to Champions League group stage
3	Borussia Dortmund	34	15	13	6	51	27	+24	58	Qualification to Champions League third qualifying round
4	Hamburger SV	34	15	11	8	46	36	+10	56	Qualification to UEFA Cup first round
5	Hertha BSC	34	16	6	12	52	43	+9	54	Qualification to UEFA Cup first round
6	Werder Bremen	34	16	4	14	51	50	+1	52	Qualification to Intertoto Cup third round

Source: bundesliga.de
Rules for classification: 1) points; 2) goal difference; 3) number of goals scored.

==== Matches ====
- Hamburg-Hannover 2–1
- 0–1 Dariusz Żuraw 6'
- 1–1 Jörg Albertz 82'
- 2–1 Jörg Albertz 84' (pen.)
- SV Werder Bremen-Hamburg 2–1
- 1–0 Angelos Charisteas (9)
- 1–1 Tomáš Ujfaluši (20)
- 2–1 Holger Wehlage (50)
- Hamburg-Bayern Munich 0–3
- 0–1 Claudio Pizarro (25)
- 0–2 Claudio Pizarro (85)
- 0–3 Alexander Zickler (88)
- Wolfsburg-Hamburg 2–1
- 1–0 Stefan Effenberg (51 pen)
- 1–1 Roda Antar (71)
- 2–1 Hans Sarpei (83)
- Hamburg-Kaiserslautern 2–0
- 1–0 Bernardo Romeo (66)
- 2–0 Bernardo Romeo (77)
- Hertha BSC-Hamburg 2–0
- 1–0 Marcelinho (50)
- 2–0 Bart Goor (52)
- Hamburg-Stuttgart 3–2
- 0–1 Jochen Seitz (9)
- 1–1 Bernardo Romeo (14)
- 2–1 Sergej Barbarez (22)
- 2–2 Alexander Hleb (25)
- 3–2 Bernardo Romeo (86)
- Schalke 04-Hamburg 3–0
- 1–0 Victor Agali (9)
- 2–0 Ebbe Sand (15)
- 3–0 Gerald Asamoah (45)
- Hamburg-Mönchengladbach 1–0
- 1–0 Erik Meijer (47)
- Arminia Bielefeld-Hamburg 2–1
- 1–0 Mamadou Diabang (14)
- 2–0 Mamadou Diabang (57)
- 2–1 Erik Meijer (66)
- Borussia Dortmund-Hamburg 1–1
- 1–0 Tomáš Rosický (68)
- 1–1 Kim Christensen (88)
- Hamburg-1860 Munich 1–0
- 1–0 Bernardo Romeo (29)
- Nürnberg-Hamburg 1–3
- 0–1 Sergej Barbarez (26)
- 1–1 Saša Ćirić (40 pen)
- 1–2 Marcel Maltritz (51)
- 1–3 Bernardo Romeo (66)
- Hamburg-Energie Cottbus 1–1
- 1–0 Rodolfo Cardoso (47)
- 1–1 Andrzej Juskowiak (90)
- Bayer Leverkusen-Hamburg 2–3
- 0–1 Bernardo Romeo (3)
- 1–1 Hanno Balitsch (11)
- 2–1 Yıldıray Baştürk (21)
- 2–2 Bernardo Romeo (52)
- 2–3 Sergej Barbarez (76)
- Hamburg-Bochum 1–1
- 1–0 Sergej Barbarez (56)
- 1–1 Peter Graulund (90)
- Hansa Rostock-Hamburg 0–0
- Hannover-Hamburg 2–2
- 1–0 Fredi Bobić (40)
- 2–0 Mohamadou Idrissou (50)
- 2–1 Tomáš Ujfaluši (63)
- 2–2 Erik Meijer (78)
- Hamburg-Werder Bremen 1–0
- 1–0 Sergej Barbarez (56)
- Bayern Munich-Hamburg 1–1
- 1–0 Claudio Pizarro (11)
- 1–1 Naohiro Takahara (90)
- Hamburg-Wolfsburg 2–0
- 1–0 Rodolfo Cardoso (38)
- 2–0 Collin Benjamin (90)
- Kaiserslautern-Hamburg 2–0
- 1–0 Vratislav Lokvenc (51)
- 2–0 Miroslav Klose (57)
- Hamburg-Hertha BSC 1–0
- 1–0 Nico-Jan Hoogma (56)
- Stuttgart-Hamburg 1–1
- 1–0 Kevin Kurányi (20)
- 1–1 Mehdi Mahdavikia (43)
- Hamburg-Schalke 04 3–1
- 1–0 Bernardo Romeo (29)
- 1–1 Marco van Hoogdalem (57)
- 2–1 Naohiro Takahara (85)
- 3–1 Bernardo Romeo (90)
- Mönchengladbach-Hamburg 2–0
- 1–0 Mikael Forssell (6)
- 2–0 Marcelo Pletsch (55)
- Hamburg-Arminia Bielefeld 1–0
- 1–0 Bastian Reinhardt (10 og)
- Hamburg-Borussia Dortmund 1–1
- 1–0 Bernardo Romeo (65)
- 1–1 Jan Koller (68)
- 1860 Munich-Hamburg 1–1
- 1–0 Martin Max (36)
- 1–1 Milan Fukal (65)
- Hamburg-Nürnberg 4–0
- 1–0 Milan Fukal (36)
- 2–0 Bernardo Romeo (43)
- 3–0 Mehdi Mahdavikia (55)
- 4–0 Naohiro Takahara (76)
- Energie Cottbus-Hamburg 0–0
- Hamburg-Bayer Leverkusen 4–1
- 1–0 Sergej Barbarez (18)
- 2–0 Bernardo Romeo (55)
- 2–1 Hanno Balitsch (88)
- 3–1 Lars Jacobsen (90)
- 4–1 Erik Meijer (90)
- Bochum-Hamburg 1–1
- 1–0 Thomas Christiansen (31)
- 1–1 Christian Rahn (82)
- Hamburg-Hansa Rostock 2–0
- 1–0 Rodolfo Cardoso (45)
- 2–0 Bernardo Romeo (53)
