= 2003 DFB-Ligapokal final =

German League Cup
- Event: 2003 DFB-Ligapokal
Borussia Dortmund	Hamburger SV
2	4
- Date: 28 July 2003
- Venue: Bruchwegstadion, Mainz
- Referee: Jürgen Aust (Cologne)
- Attendance: 16,700

The 2003 DFB-Ligapokal final decided the winner of the 2003 DFB-Ligapokal, the 7th edition of the reiterated DFB-Ligapokal, a knockout football cup competition.

The match was played on 28 July 2003 at the Bruchwegstadion in Mainz. Hamburger SV won the match 4–2 against Borussia Dortmund for their 1st title of the reiterated competition, and 2nd title including the 1972–73 edition.

== Teams ==
Team	Qualification for tournament	Previous appearances (bold indicates winners)
Borussia Dortmund	2002–03 Bundesliga third place	None
Hamburger SV	2002–03 Bundesliga fourth place	1 (**1973**)

== Route to the final ==
The DFB-Ligapokal is a six team single-elimination knockout cup competition. There are a total of two rounds leading up to the final. Four teams enter the preliminary round, with the two winners advancing to the semi-finals, where they will be joined by two additional clubs who were given a bye. For all matches, the winner after 90 minutes advances. If still tied, extra time, and if necessary penalties are used to determine the winner.

Borussia Dortmund		Round	Hamburger SV
Opponent	Result	2003 DFB-Ligapokal	Opponent	Result
VfL Bochum	2–1	Preliminary round	Hertha BSC	2–1
VfB Stuttgart	1–0	Semi-finals	Bayern Munich	3–3 (4–1 p)

== Match ==
=== Details ===
28 July 2003
20:30 CEST

Borussia Dortmund	2–4	Hamburger SV
Amoroso 24' (pen.); Koller 61'	Report	Hoogma 3'; Cardoso 12'; Takahara 18'; Beinlich 68'

Bruchwegstadion, Mainz
Attendance: 16,700
Referee: Jürgen Aust (Cologne)

**Borussia Dortmund**	**Hamburger SV**

GK	1	(Germany) Roman Weidenfeller	Booked
RB	7	(Germany) Stefan Reuter		(substituted off) 70'
CB	4	(Germany) Christian Wörns
CB	23	(Algeria) Ahmed Reda Madouni
LB	17	(Brazil) Dédé	Booked
RM	18	(Germany) Lars Ricken		(substituted off) 66'
CM	14	(France) Guy Demel	Booked	(substituted off) 81'
CM	5	(Germany) Sebastian Kehl	(red card) 90+4'
LM	10	(Czech Republic) Tomáš Rosický (c)
CF	9	(Czech Republic) Jan Koller
CF	22	(Brazil) Márcio Amoroso
Substitutes:
GK	29	(Germany) Matthias Kleinsteiber
DF	15	(Denmark) Niclas Jensen
MF	16	(Brazil) Leandro
MF	19	(Ghana) Otto Addo	(red card) 90+3'	(substituted on) 70'
MF	24	(Germany) David Odonkor		(substituted on) 81'
FW	13	(Germany) Giuseppe Reina		(substituted on) 66'
FW	25	(Germany) Sahr Senesie
Manager:
(Germany) Matthias Sammer

GK	1	(Germany) Martin Pieckenhagen
RB	12	(Denmark) Lars Jacobsen (c)
CB	5	(Netherlands) Nico-Jan Hoogma	Booked
CB	21	(Czech Republic) Tomáš Ujfaluši
LB	3	(Germany) Christian Rahn	Booked
CM	2	(Germany) Marcel Maltritz	Booked
CM	22	(Germany) Stefan Beinlich		(substituted off) 89'
AM	14	(Bosnia and Herzegovina) Sergej Barbarez		(substituted off) 77'
RW	7	(Iran) Mehdi Mahdavikia
CF	32	(Japan) Naohiro Takahara
LW	27	(Argentina) Rodolfo Cardoso		(substituted off) 59'
Substitutes:
GK	29	(Germany) Stefan Wächter
DF	4	(Germany) Bastian Reinhardt
DF	15	(Germany) Björn Schlicke		(substituted on) 89'
DF	24	(Germany) Stephan Kling		(substituted on) 77'
MF	6	(Switzerland) Raphaël Wicky		(substituted on) 59'
MF	28	(Germany) Fabian Bröcker
FW	30	(Germany) Eren Şen
Manager:
(Austria) Kurt Jara
