= Ottmar Hitzfeld =

German football manager (born 1949)

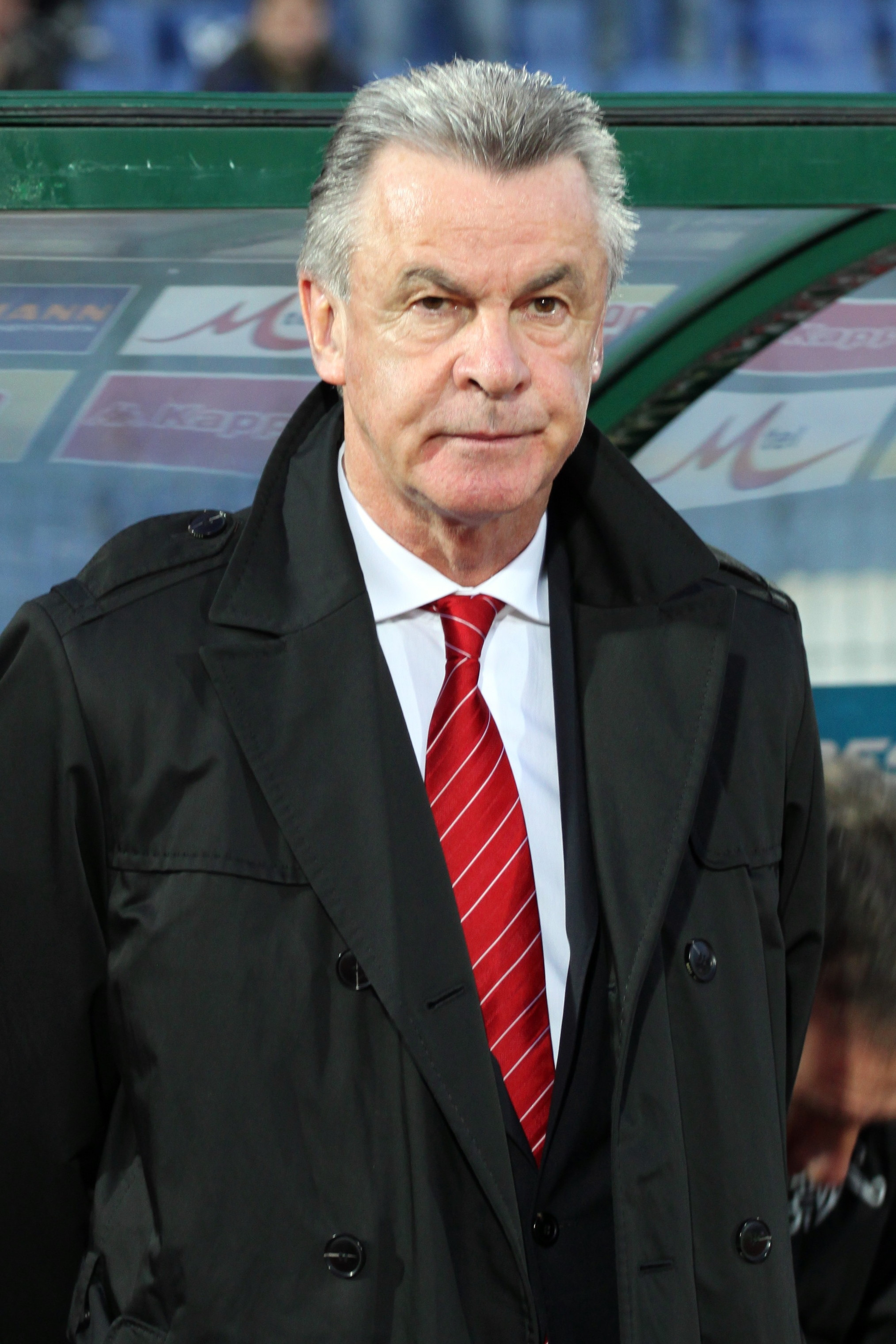
- Hitzfeld coaching Switzerland in 2011

Personal information
- Date of birth: 12 January 1949 (age 77)
- Place of birth: Lörrach, Germany
- Height: 1.78 m (5 ft 10 in)
- Position: Forward

Youth career
- 1960–1967: TuS Stetten
- 1967–1968: FV Lörrach

Senior career*
Years	Team	Apps	(Gls)
1971–1975	Basel	92	(66)
1975–1978	VfB Stuttgart	80	(38)
1978–1980	Lugano	55	(35)
1980–1983	Luzern	72	(30)
Total		300	(169)

International career
1972	West Germany (Olympic)	6	(5)

Managerial career
- 1983–1984: SC Zug
- 1984–1988: Aarau
- 1988–1991: Grasshoppers
- 1991–1997: Borussia Dortmund
- 1998–2004: Bayern Munich
- 2007–2008: Bayern Munich
- 2008–2014: Switzerland
- * Club domestic league appearances and goals

Ottmar Hitzfeld (German pronunciation: [ˈʔɔtmaːɐ̯ ˈhɪt͡sfɛlt]; born 12 January 1949) is a German former professional football player and a former manager. Nicknamed "der General" ("the General"), he accumulated a total of 25 major titles, mostly in his tenures with Grasshoppers, Borussia Dortmund and Bayern Munich.

A striker in his playing days, Hitzfeld won two Swiss Super League titles (1971–72, 1972–73) with Basel. He was top goalscorer in the league for the 1972–73 season. He earned six caps for the West Germany national team, all at the 1972 Summer Olympics in Munich.

A trained mathematician and sports teacher, Hitzfeld is one of the most successful coaches of German and international football. As manager, he won two Bundesliga titles with Dortmund and five Bundesliga titles with Bayern Munich. He won the 1996–97 Champions League with Dortmund, beating a star-studded Juventus team in the final. He won the 2000–01 Champions League with Bayern, defeating Valencia in the final.

He has been elected "World Coach of the Year" twice; he is one of only seven managers to win the European Cup/UEFA Champions League with two clubs, along with Ernst Happel, Luis Enrique, Pep Guardiola, José Mourinho, Jupp Heynckes, and Carlo Ancelotti.

== Playing career ==
Born in Lörrach, Hitzfeld started playing football in the late 1960s with TuS Stetten and FV Lörrach in the lower German leagues, before he captured the attention of Swiss first division team Basel. He joined the club, located on the other bank of the Rhine, in 1971. With this club the forward won the Swiss championship in 1972 and 1973, in the latter season even contributing as the top striker in Switzerland. In 1975, he also won the cup with Basel.

In 1973, while playing at Basel, he graduated from nearby Lörrach College as a teacher of mathematics and sports. He retained his amateur status to be able to participate in the 1972 Summer Olympics in Munich. There, he played amongst others with Uli Hoeneß, the later Bayern Munich player and general manager who would hire him as coach in the late 1990s. One of the highlights of this tournament was the first encounter between the national sides of West and East Germany on the football pitch. West Germany lost this match 2–3, and thus failed to reach the semifinals. In this match, Hitzfeld scored one of his five goals in the tournament. In 1975, the 26-year-old Hitzfeld accepted an offer by the then German second division side VfB Stuttgart. At the Swabian side, he was part of a legendary "100 goal offense" (the goal difference that season being 100:36) and in one match against SSV Jahn Regensburg he scored six goals, still the record for a 2. Bundesliga player. After two years, in 1977, the team achieved promotion to the first division, the Bundesliga. Hitzfeld had by that time scored 33 goals in 55 league matches. In the Bundesliga, the club finished the season a remarkable fourth. Hitzfeld contributed five goals in 22 matches. After three years with Stuttgart, Hitzfeld returned to what by then had become his second home, Switzerland. There, he played from 1978 to 1980 with Lugano before joining Luzern, where he finished his playing career in 1983, aged 34.

== Managerial career ==
=== 1983–1991: Coaching in Switzerland ===
During the summer of 1983, Hitzfeld signed his first coaching contract with SC Zug, in the second tier of Swiss football. The team ended the 1983–84 season as Nationalliga B champions. Thus Hitzfeld and his team achieved immediate promotion to the Nationalliga A, for the first and only time in the clubs history. In 1984, he followed an offer to coach Aarau, where he settled for four years. His tenure there was crowned with his first title as coach, the 1985 Swiss Cup. Soon he attracted also the attention of the major Swiss club Grasshoppers in Zürich. Between 1988 and 1991, he gained another four trophies there, starting with a repeat of his cup victory by the end of his first season. The next year, he followed up with the double before finishing his engagement with the defence of the Swiss Championship in 1991.

=== 1991–1998: Borussia Dortmund ===
In 1991, Hitzfeld became manager of Bundesliga club Borussia Dortmund. In his first year, he and his assistant Michael Henke, with whom he would collaborate for the next 13 years, took the team to second spot in the league, securing a 1992–93 UEFA Cup place. The following season, Dortmund reached the finals of this competition, but both matches were lost against Juventus. In 1995, he gained his first Bundesliga title with Dortmund, their first trophy since the DFB-Pokal in 1989, and Hitzfeld's first trophy in Germany. In 1995–96, he had a successful defence of the title, but the great triumph had to wait for another year: in 1997, Dortmund finished third in the league, but reached the UEFA Champions League final, where another encounter with Juventus was due. This time, Borussia prevailed 3–1 at Munich's Olympiastadion against the team from northern Italy which featured Zinedine Zidane, Didier Deschamps, and Christian Vieri, amongst others. For his success, Hitzfeld was rewarded for the first time with the "World Coach of the Year" award, but as frictions with the team had come to a head, he was promoted out of the firing line to the position of sports manager with the club, where he witnessed his successor, Nevio Scala, taking Borussia Dortmund to win the 1997 Intercontinental Cup against Cruzeiro from Brazil. He finished with a record of 144 wins, 63 draws, and 65 losses.

=== 1998–2008: Bayern Munich ===
==== First spell ====
In 1998, Hitzfeld was hired by Germany's most successful club, Bayern Munich. In his first year, he led the club to renewed championship glories, winning the league title by 15 points, a record margin. However, the club lost the DFB-Pokal final to Werder Bremen on penalties. Most important was their run to the Champions League final. The final is remembered for the dramatic Manchester United comeback inside the injury time period. Trailing 1–0, United scored two goals in stoppage time, condemning Bayern to a stunning defeat. They had also won the DFB-Ligapokal.

In the next season, domestic success was improved upon with Bayern winning the double. After winning by a record margin last season, Bayern won on a heartbeat finish this season. They had won the league on a tiebreaker. Hitzfeld's team depended on the neighbours from Unterhaching, a suburb of Munich, to beat Bayer Leverkusen on the last day play to secure the title. The DFB-Pokal final was won against Bremen, the team which beat Bayern in the previous final. In the Champions League, Bayern was stopped in the semi-final by eventual winners Real Madrid.

In the 2000–01 season, Hitzfeld led Bayern not only to the league championship hat-trick, but once again into the Champions League final, defeating winner in previous two editions: Manchester United and defending champions Real Madrid en route (1-3 on aggregate, 1-0 away, 2-1 home). This time, the side from Munich prevailed, though it took a penalty shoot-out against Valencia. This made Hitzfeld only the second coach after Ernst Happel to win the major European trophy with two teams.

Again, he was recognized with the honour of "World Coach of the Year", but this time he remained in control over his team in the ensuing 2001 Intercontinental Cup final against Boca Juniors from Argentina. A sole goal by Ghanaian defender Samuel Kuffour in extra-time made it an evening to celebrate for Hitzfeld and his team. By then, the team had a tendency to put in lacklustre performances and in the end had to make do with third place in the league.

The 2002–03 season started on 25 July 2002 when Bayern were knocked out of the DFB-Ligapokal in a shootout by Hertha BSC. In the 2002–03 season, Bayern once more dominated German football, claiming the league title four matches before the end of the Bundesliga season. Bayern won with a 16-point lead over second-place Stuttgart. With a 3–1 win over Kaiserslautern in the 2003 DFB-Pokal final, Hitzfeld's team secured another double.

Bayern started the 2003–04 season by getting knocked out of the DFB-Ligapokal in the semi-finals after losing a shootout Hamburger SV on 22 July 2003. The 2003–04 season yielded no titles after Bayern finished in second place, and getting knocked out of the DFB-Pokal in the quarter-finals by Alemannia Aachen, and getting knocked out of UEFA Champions League by Real Madrid in the round of 16. The club sacked Hitzfeld with a year remaining year of the contract of the 55-year-old coach. His final match was a 2–0 win against SC Freiburg on 22 May 2004. Hitzfeld finished with a record of 193 wins, 73 draws, 53 losses.

==== Second spell ====
Hitzfeld had an offer to take over the reins of the Germany national team in 2004 and was also linked with Schalke in 2005, but preferred to take a break from the game. On 1 February 2007, following the sacking of Felix Magath, he returned to Bayern Munich. His first match back was a 3–0 loss against 1. FC Nürnberg. Hopes that he might lead Bayern to another championship, despite trailing by eight points with 15 games remaining, were not fulfilled, though. Eventually, Bayern finished fourth, thereby failing to qualify for the Champions League for the first time in more than a decade. A multimillion spending spree before the new season helped Hitzfeld to lead the club to a new phase of domestic dominance, winning the DFL-Ligapokal, the DFB-Pokal, and the league championship. After several high wins and many draws, Bayern's UEFA Cup campaign ended in the semifinal with a humbling 4–0 defeat by eventual winner Zenit St. Petersburg. During the season, Hitzfeld had announced that he would not be available for another season at the helm and Jürgen Klinsmann became his successor at Bayern. His final match was a 4–1 win against Hertha BSC.

=== 2008–2014: Swiss national team ===
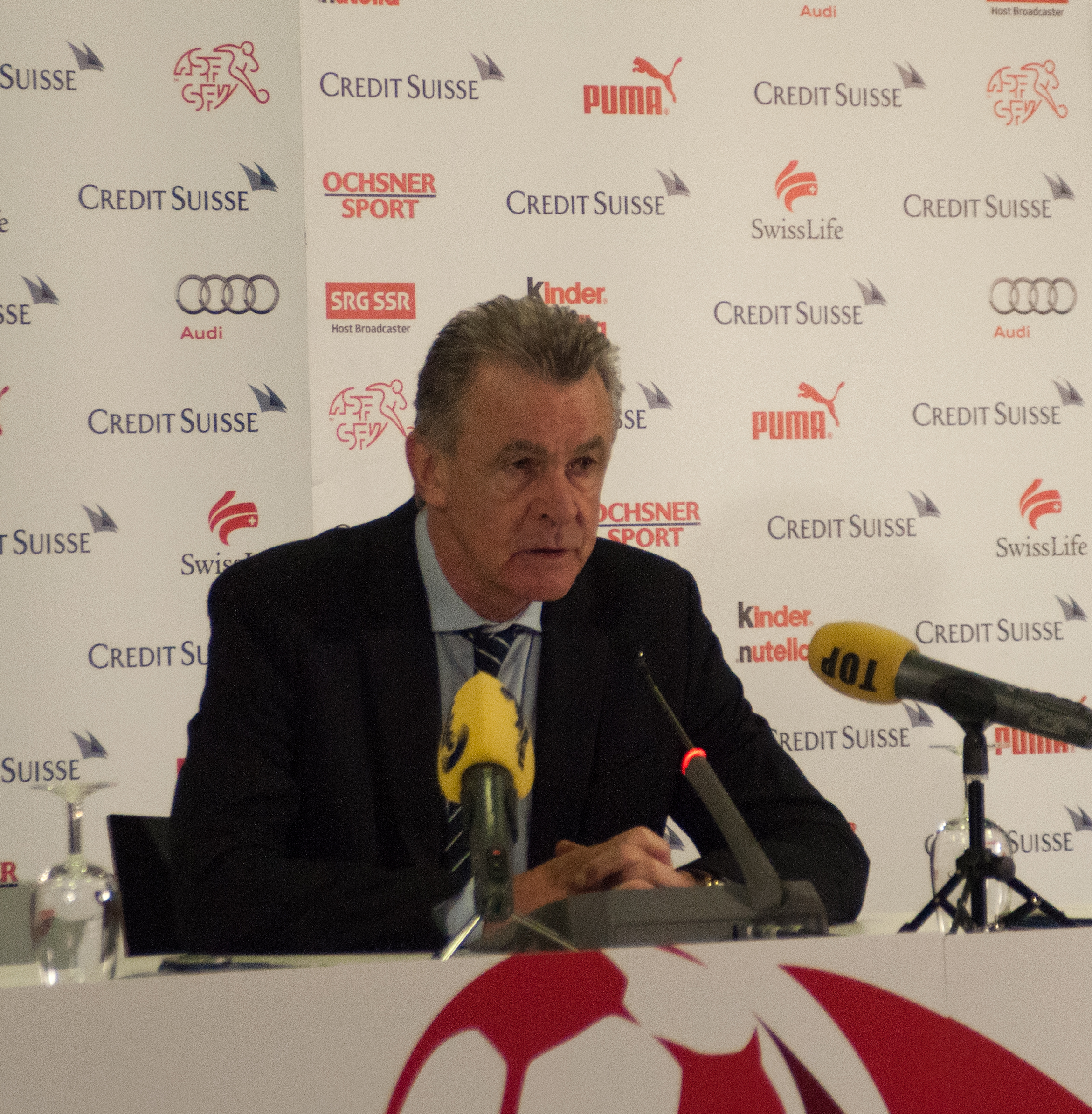
Hitzfeld at a 2012 press conference

Hitzfeld took over as coach of the Swiss national team in summer 2008. His first match at the helm was a friendly match that finished as a 4–1 win for Switzerland against Cyprus on 20 August 2008. His first competitive match was a 2–2 draw against Israel on 6 September 2008 in qualifying for the 2010 FIFA World Cup. Switzerland finished FIFA World Cup qualifying with a 0–0 draw against Israel on 14 October 2009. Switzerland finished top of its qualifying group to reach the 2010 FIFA World Cup in South Africa. Switzerland played Uruguay, Costa Rica, and Italy in friendlies leading up to the FIFA World Cup. Switzerland lost 3–1 to Uruguay on 3 March 2010, lost 1–0 to Costa Rica on 1 June 2010, and drew Italy 1–1 on 5 June 2010. Although Switzerland won their opening match 1–0 against eventual champions Spain, they went on to lose 1–0 against Chile and get a 0–0 draw against Honduras which eliminated their chances of qualifying from Group H.

Switzerland failed to qualify for Euro 2012, finishing third behind England and Montenegro in their qualifying group. Switzerland started qualifying with two consecutive losses to England and Montenegro. Then they defeated Wales in their final qualifier of 2010. They stretched their undefeated streak to four matches after a draw against England and a draw and a win against Bulgaria. The undefeated streak ended when Switzerland lost to Wales before defeating Montenegro in their final qualifying match. Switzerland started 2012 with a 3–1 loss to Argentina on 29 February 2012 and a 5–3 win against Germany on 26 May 2012. Then Switzerland lost to Romania four days later. Switzerland defeated Croatia on 15 August 2012.

Hitzfeld led Switzerland to a second successive FIFA World Cup as his team remained unbeaten throughout the qualifying campaign. Switzerland started qualifying with a pair of 2–0 wins against Slovenia on 7 September 2012 and Albania on 11 September 2012. Then they drew Norway 1–1 on 12 October 2012 and defeated Iceland 2–0 four days later. In the final match of 2012, Switzerland defeated Tunisia 2–1 in a friendly match. Switzerland started 2013 with a 0–0 draw against Greece on 6 February 2013. Switzerland's next two matches were against Cyprus. The match on 23 March 2013 finished in a 0–0 draw and the match on 8 June 2013 finished in a 1–0 win for Switzerland. Switzerland beat Brazil on 14 August 2013. Switzerland finished out qualifying with a 4–4 draw against Iceland and three consecutive wins against Norway, Albania, and Slovenia. On 17 October 2013, Hitzfeld announced that he would be retiring after the 2014 FIFA World Cup. Switzerland finished 2013 with a 2–1 loss against South Korea in a friendly match. Leading into the FIFA World Cup, Switzerland drew 2–2 with Croatia and defeated Jamaica and Peru. Switzerland defeated Ecuador, lost to France, and defeated Honduras to finish second in Group E. Hitzfeld's final match was a 1–0 extra time loss against Argentina in the round of 16 at the FIFA World Cup on 1 July 2014. Vladimir Petković succeeded Hitzfeld.

=== Retirement ===
He announced his retirement from coaching after the World Cup with Vladimir Petković taking over on 1 July 2014.

It was said that Chinese Super League club Guangzhou Evergrande once offered Hitzfeld an 18–month-long contract, with a value of 24 million euros. However, he turned it down.

=== Overview ===
==== International level ====
Year	Competitions							Friendly matches							Ref.
Year	M	W	D	L	GF	GA	Win %	M	W	D	L	GF	GA	Win %	Ref.
2008	4	2	1	1	7	6	50.00	2	2	0	0	5	1	100.00	
2009	6	4	2	0	11	2	66.67	3	0	2	1	1	2	0.00	
2010	6	2	1	3	6	6	33.33	6	1	3	2	5	7	16.67	
2011	5	2	2	1	7	5	40.00	4	2	2	0	3	1	50.00	
2012	4	3	1	0	7	1	75.00	5	3	0	2	12	10	60.00	
2013	6	4	2	0	10	5	66.67	3	1	1	1	2	2	33.33	
2014	4	2	0	2	7	7	50.00	3	2	1	0	5	2	66.67	
Totals	35	19	9	7	55	32	54.29	26	11	9	6	33	25	42.31	—

== Personal life ==
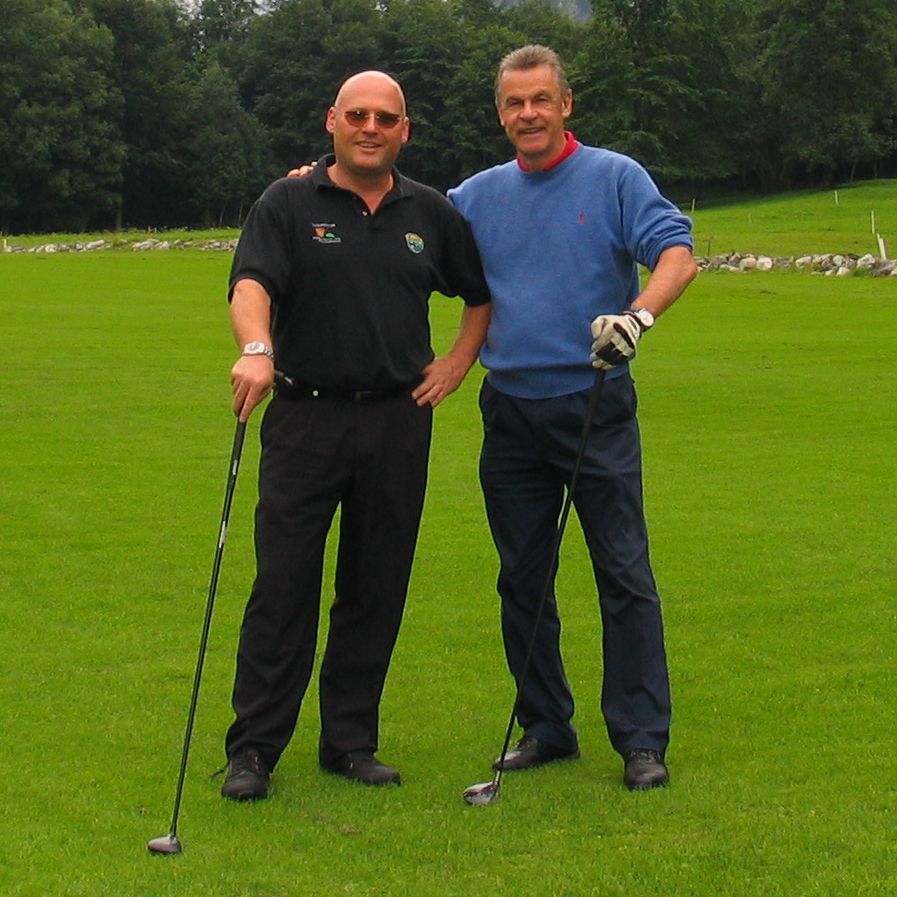
Hitzfeld (right) in 2005

Hitzfeld was born in Lörrach in the valley of the Wiese in southwest Germany, close to the Swiss border. He grew up there and is the youngest of five children. Hitzfeld said that when he first left Bayern in 2004 he 'felt burnt out' and 'was a bit depressed', and 'it took me two years to recover.' He then had 'the best years at Bayern' on his return. He stated his views that people should not get too excited about things, not get too down about things, and treat each situation individually. His uncle was the World War II general Otto Hitzfeld.

Hitzfeld is married to Beatrix Hitzfeld. They have one child and three grandchildren. Hitzfeld's a devout Roman Catholic.

The Ottmar Hitzfeld Arena, the highest altitude stadium in Europe, is named after him.

== Managerial statistics ==
As of 1 July 2014

Team	From	To	Record					
Team	From	To	G	W	D	L	Win %	Ref.
Zug	1983	1984	32	17	9	6	53.13	
Aarau	1984	1988	162	85	37	40	52.47	
Grasshopper Club	1988	1991	142	73	36	33	51.41	
Borussia Dortmund	1 July 1991	30 June 1997	272	144	63	65	52.94	
Bayern Munich	1 July 1998	30 June 2004	319	193	73	53	60.50	
Bayern Munich	1 February 2007	30 June 2008	76	45	20	11	59.21	
Switzerland	1 July 2008	1 July 2014	64	33	18	13	51.56	
Total			1,067	590	256	221	55.30	—

== Honours ==
=== Player ===
Basel

- Swiss Super League: 1971–72, 1972–73
- Swiss Cup: 1975

==== Individual ====
- Swiss Super League top goalscorer: 1972–73 (18 goals, shared with Ove Grahn)

=== Manager ===
SC Zug

- Nationalliga B: 1983–84

Aarau

- Swiss Cup: 1984–85

Grasshopper

- Swiss Super League: 1989–90, 1990–91
- Swiss Cup: 1988–89, 1989–90
- Swiss Super Cup: 1989

Borussia Dortmund

- Bundesliga: 1994–95, 1995–96
- DFB-Supercup: 1995, 1996
- UEFA Champions League: 1996–97
- UEFA Cup runner-up: 1993

Bayern Munich

- Bundesliga: 1998–99, 1999–2000, 2000–01, 2002–03, 2007–08
- DFB-Pokal: 1999–2000, 2002–03, 2007–08
- DFB/DFL-Ligapokal: 1998, 1999, 2000, 2007
- UEFA Champions League: 2000–01; runner-up: 1998–99
- Intercontinental Cup: 2001

==== Individual ====
- IFFHS World's Best Club Coach: 1997, 2001
- World Soccer Magazine World Manager of the Year: 1997
- UEFA Coach of the Year: 2001
- German Football Manager of the Year: 2008
- ESPN 13th Greatest Manager of All Time: 2013
- World Soccer 17th Greatest Manager of All Time: 2013
- France Football 19th Greatest Manager of All time: 2019

== See also ==
- List of football managers with the most matches
