= Munich derby =

Football matches between FC Bayern Munich and TSV 1860 Munich

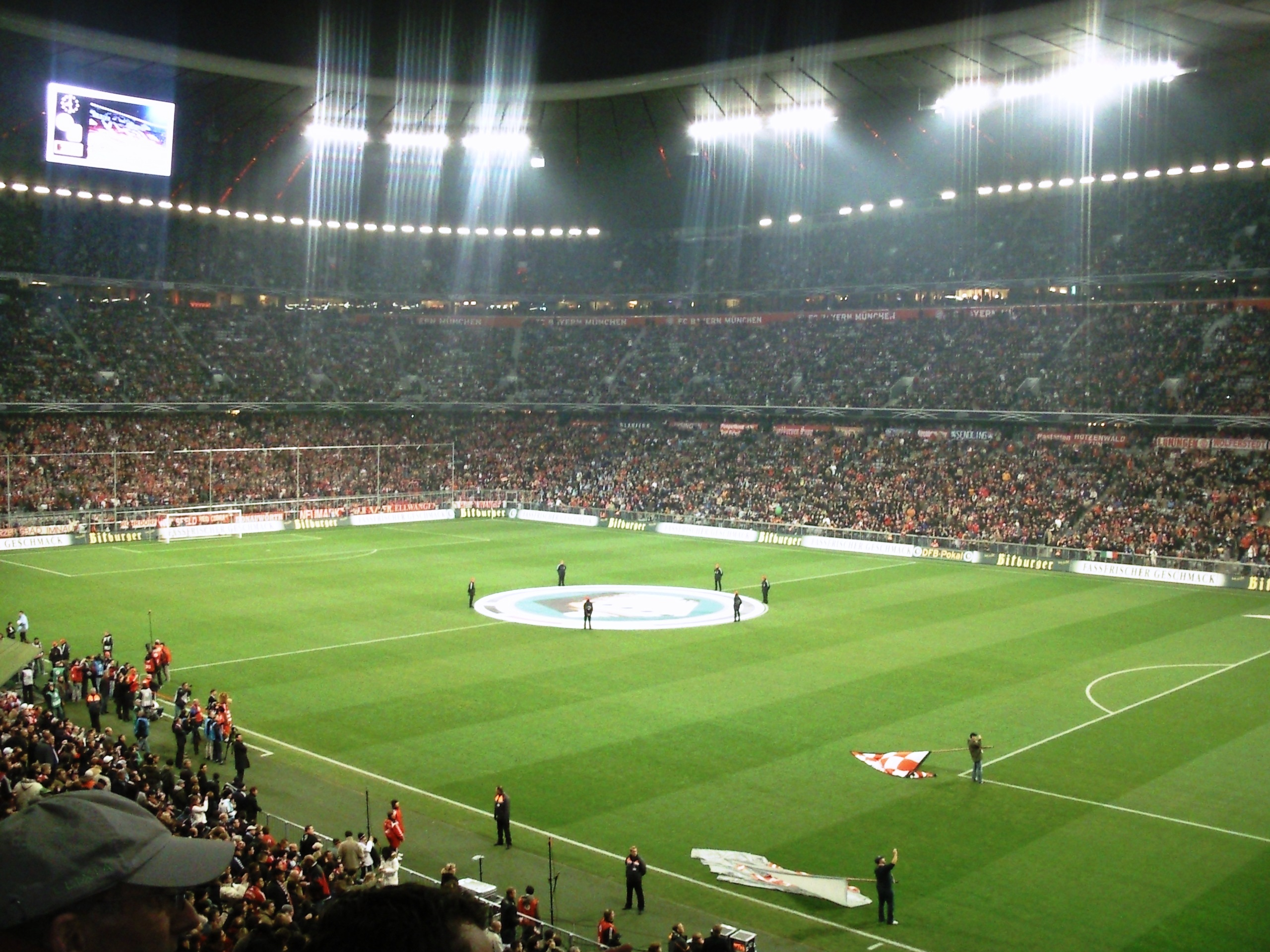
- DFB-Pokal Quarter-Final 2008 Bayern against 1860 in Allianz Arena

- 1860 Munich FC Bayern
- Other names: Münchner Stadtderby; Münchner Lokalderby
- Location: Munich, Germany
- Teams: Bayern & 1860; Bayern II & 1860 II
- First meeting: Bayern 3–0 1860 (21 September 1902; 124 years ago)
- Latest meeting: Bayern 1–0 1860 (27 February 2008; 18 years ago)
- Next meeting: TBD
- Stadiums: Grünwalder Stadion; Olympiastadion; Allianz Arena

Statistics
- Total meetings: 205
- Most wins: Bayern (105)
- All-time series: Bayern: 105; Drawn: 50; 1860: 50
- Largest victory: 1860 8–0 Bayern (22 December 1918; 107 years ago)

The Munich derby (German: Münchner Stadtderby) is the name given to football matches between Bayern Munich and 1860 Munich, both of them from Munich, Germany.

== History ==
=== Early years (1902–1933) ===
Although the TSV has existed since 1860, a football section was founded in 1899. In contrast, Bayern was founded by members of a Munich gymnastics club. The first ever Munich derby was contested in September 1902. In the first years, Bayern mainly won the derbies. However, since football in Germany was organised on a very regional level in this time, the rivalry was not very pronounced since both team played against many other Munich-based teams such as FC Wacker München or 1. Münchner FC 1896. At the end of this period, both clubs became more and more successful: 1860 entered the final of the German football championship in 1931 (but lost against Hertha BSC) and Bayern won against Eintracht Frankfurt one year later. In 1933, 1860 reached the final of the Southern German championship.

=== The Nazi period (1933–1945) ===
With beginning of the Nazi era in Germany, both clubs were put in the newly founded Gauliga Bayern. In this period, Bayern suffered because many Jewish members, such as Kurt Landauer were forced to leave the club. In contrast, 1860 was less affected by the enforcement of the Aryan paragraph. Particularly during the war time, 1860 became successful: They won their first national trophy the Tschammerpokal (today known as the German Cup) in 1942. 1860 returned to the national playoffs in 1943, reaching the quarter-finals.

=== Increasing rivalry (1945–1963) ===
After the end of the second World War, football quickly became popular again in the population. Already in 1945, the American allied administration allowed the foundation of the Oberliga Süd. As this league, in contrast to the previous Gauliga Bayern, also included teams from Hesse and Baden-Württemberg, Bayern and 1860 became the only two clubs from Munich which resulted in an increased rivalry. Other Munich-based teams declined in importance. In this period, both teams could hardly point to successes with the exception of Bayern's victory in the 1957 German Cup.

=== Struggle for domination (1963–1970) ===
The regulations by the German football federation for the inaugural Bundesliga season stipulated that only one team from one city should be promoted. Due to opaque rules, Bayern instead of 1860 was forced to play in the second tier. 1860 won the German Cup in this season, followed by a successful European campaign leading to European Cup Winners' Cup final which was lost to West Ham United. In Bayern's season of promotion Munich became the football capital of Germany: 1860 clinched their first Bundesliga title whereas Bayern won the German Cup final. After that, the conditions began to turn: While 1860 gained the second place in the Bundesliga, Bayern defended the German Cup and won the European Cup Winners' Cup in Nuremberg. In 1969, Bayern captured their first German double whereas 1860 slipped to the 10th position. One year later, 1860 relegated from the Bundesliga.

=== Bayern's golden years, 1860s decline (1970–1994) ===
With 1860's relegation, the relative strengths now completely turned to Bayern. After moving from Grünwalder Stadion to the much larger Olympiastadion, Bayern's golden years began. Three German championships (1972–1974) followed by three victorious European campaigns (1974–1976) marked the most successful period in Bayern's history. While Bayern became established in the Bundesliga, 1860 became a yo-yo club. Until 1999, the last derby won by 1860 was in 1977. Even in the frequently played friendlies, Bayern mostly kept the upper hand.

=== Bundesliga return of 1860 (1994–2004) ===
After 13 years mainly spent in the Bayernliga, 1860 promoted again to the top flight in 1994. In the previous season, Bayern clinched their 13th Bundesliga title. In 1999, 1860 won their first derby since 22 years. After also the return match was won, Bayern regained its leadership role again with some very high wins (5–1 in 2001 and 5–0 in 2003). Due to the successful application of the German football federation for the 2006 FIFA World Cup in June 2000, both club's forced the idea of ground-share in a new stadium.

=== Ground-sharing in the Allianz Arena (2005–2017) ===
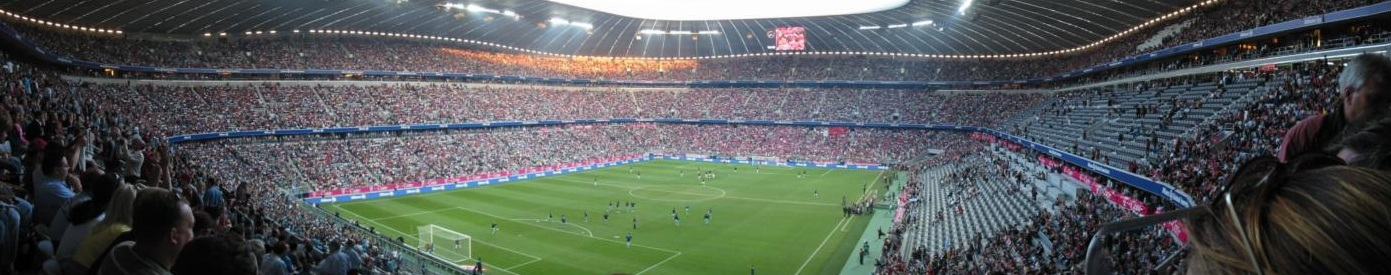
Inside Allianz Arena during a match between the two on 10 June 2005

One year before the clubs moved to the Allianz Arena, 1860 relegated to the 2. Fußball-Bundesliga again. Since then, in addition to three friendly matches, only one competitive game was held. Just one day before the match was held, unknown Bayern fans painted parts of the Grünwalder Stadion, 1860 traditional home stadium, in the club colors of Bayern, red and white.

Munich 1860 were relegated to 3. Liga at the conclusion of the 2016-17 season.

=== 1860's Return to Grünwalder Stadion (2017–) ===
On 2 June 2017, it was announced that 1860 were unable to obtain a 3. Liga license for the 2017–18 season as a result of investor Hassan Ismaik's unwillingness to pay the necessary fees. As a result, the club was relegated to the Regionalliga Bayern for the 2017–18 season. Following these events, which meant that Bayern Munich would be ground sharing with the now amateur status 1860, on 12 July 2017 Bayern Munich announced that the ground sharing arrangement with 1860 had come to an end. Shortly thereafter, Munich 1860 announced that the club would return to its traditional grounds at Stadion an der Grünwalder Straße for the 2017–18 season. Following relegation to the Regionalliga, 1860 will play matches with FC Bayern Munich II.

== All-time results ==
Bayern Munich Win 1860 Munich Win Draw

No.	Home	Date	Venue	Score	Competition	Attendance
1		21 September 1902	Sportplatz Clemensstraße	3–0	Münchner Stadtmeisterschaft	
2		1 November 1903	Schyrenwiese	2–0	Friendly	
3		12 November 1905		1–0	Münchner Stadtmeisterschaft	
123		28 September 1952	Grünwalder Stadion	2–1	Oberliga Süd	12,000
124		8 February 1953	Grünwalder Stadion	2–2	Oberliga Süd	17,000
125		18 April 1954	Grünwalder Stadion	2–2	Friendly	6,000
126		2 January 1955	Grünwalder Stadion	2–2	Friendly	20,000
127		13 August 1955	Grünwalder Stadion	1–3	Friendly	
128		26 Dezember 1956	Grünwalder Stadion	1–2	Friendly	12,000
129		15 September 1957	Grünwalder Stadion	3–3	Oberliga Süd	40,000
130		18 January 1958	Grünwalder Stadion	4–3	Oberliga Süd	40,000
131		20 September 1958	Grünwalder Stadion	1–2	Oberliga Süd	32,000
132		21 February 1959	Grünwalder Stadion	1–2	Oberliga Süd	35,000
133		12 April 1959	Grünwalder Stadion	0–0	DFB-Pokal	20,000
134		22 April 1959	Grünwalder Stadion	0–0	DFB-Pokal	17,000
135		27 September 1959	Grünwalder Stadion	4–6	Oberliga Süd	32,000
136		18 April 1960	Grünwalder Stadion	1–3	Oberliga Süd	15,000
137		18 April 1960	Grünwalder Stadion	4–1	Friendly	15,000
138		18 September 1960	Grünwalder Stadion	0–0	Oberliga Süd	28,000
139		29 January 1961	Grünwalder Stadion	6–2	Oberliga Süd	25,000
140		10 September 1961	Grünwalder Stadion	0–4	Oberliga Süd	28,000
141		28 January 1962	Grünwalder Stadion	2–3	Oberliga Süd	35,000
142		8 May 1962	Grünwalder Stadion	1–3	Friendly	
143		23 September 1962	Grünwalder Stadion	3–1	Oberliga Süd	45,000
144		3 February 1963	Grünwalder Stadion	3–1	Oberliga Süd	38,000
145		25 September 1963	Grünwalder Stadion	3–2	Friendly	7,000
146		5 August 1964	Grünwalder Stadion	4–2	Friendly	
147		14 August 1965	Grünwalder Stadion	1–0	Bundesliga	44,000
148		14 January 1966	Grünwalder Stadion	3–0	Bundesliga	40,000
149		15 October 1966	Grünwalder Stadion	3–0	Bundesliga	44,000
150		18 March 1967	Grünwalder Stadion	1–0	Bundesliga	44,000
151		1 April 1967	Grünwalder Stadion	3–1	DFB-Pokal	42,000
152		28 October 1967	Grünwalder Stadion	2–2	Bundesliga	44,000
153		30 March 1968	Grünwalder Stadion	3–2	Bundesliga	44,000
154		24 August 1968	Grünwalder Stadion	0–3	Bundesliga	44,000
155		18 January 1969	Grünwalder Stadion	0–2	Bundesliga	38,000
156		18 October 1969	Grünwalder Stadion	2–0	Bundesliga	40,500
157		7 March 1970	Grünwalder Stadion	2–1	Bundesliga	44,000
158		6 August 1971	Grünwalder Stadion	1–7	Friendly	36,000
159		3 August 1972	Olympiastadion	1–3	Ligapokal	79,000
160		23 August 1972	Grünwalder Stadion	5–3	Ligapokal	23,000
161		25 July 1973	Olympiastadion	3–0	Friendly	46,000
162		25 July 1975	Olympiastadion	3–0	Friendly	57,000
163		3 August 1976	Olympiastadion	1–0	Friendly	40,000
164		27 July 1977	Olympiastadion	2–1	Friendly	67,000
165		12 November 1977	Olympiastadion	1–3	Bundesliga	77,000
166		8 April 1978	Olympiastadion	1–1	Bundesliga	60,300
167		19 July 1978	Olympiastadion	2–2	Friendly	48,000
168		27 March 1979	Grünwalder Stadion	1–1	Friendly	26,000
169		25 July 1979	Olympiastadion	3–0	Friendly	68,000
170		17 November 1979	Olympiastadion	1–2	Bundesliga	78,000
171		10 May 1980	Olympiastadion	6–1	Bundesliga	77,500
172		22 July 1980	Olympiastadion	2–3	Friendly	35,000
173		14 October 1980	Olympiastadion	1–3	Bundesliga	53,000
174		28 March 1981	Olympiastadion	1–1	Bundesliga	63,000
175		23 July 1981	Olympiastadion	1–1	Friendly	25,000
176		9 August 1983	Olympiastadion	5–0	Friendly	17,000
177		30 September 1984	Grünwalder Stadion	1–5	Friendly	3,500
178		16 July 1991	Olympiastadion	0–0	Friendly	40,000
179		6 April 1992	Grünwalder Stadion	1–4	Friendly	7,000
180		21 September 1994	Olympiastadion	1–3	Bundesliga	64,000
181		25 March 1995	Olympiastadion	1–0	Bundesliga	63,000
182		2 September 1995	Olympiastadion	0–2	Bundesliga	70,800
183		2 March 1996	Olympiastadion	4–2	Bundesliga	69,000
184		1 November 1996	Olympiastadion	1–1	Bundesliga	69,000
185		4 May 1997	Olympiastadion	3–3	Bundesliga	69,000
186		1 November 1997	Olympiastadion	2–2	Bundesliga	69,900
187		11 April 1998	Olympiastadion	3–1	Bundesliga	69,000
188		7 November 1998	Olympiastadion	3–1	Bundesliga	69,000
189		25 April 1999	Olympiastadion	1–1	Bundesliga	69,000
190		27 November 1999	Olympiastadion	1–0	Bundesliga	69,000
191		15 April 2000	Olympiastadion	1–2	Bundesliga	69,000
192		21 October 2000	Olympiastadion	3–1	Bundesliga	69,000
193		17 March 2001	Olympiastadion	0–2	Bundesliga	69,000
194		13 October 2001	Olympiastadion	1–5	Bundesliga	69,000
195		9 March 2002	Olympiastadion	2–1	Bundesliga	68,000
196		10 September 2002	Olympiastadion	3–1	Bundesliga	69,000
197		15 February 2003	Olympiastadion	0–5	Bundesliga	64,000
198		22 November 2003	Olympiastadion	0–1	Bundesliga	69,000
199		25 April 2004	Olympiastadion	1–0	Bundesliga	71,000
200		19 July 2004	Olympiastadion	1–0	Friendly	10,000
201		2 June 2005	Allianz Arena	1–0	Friendly	64,000
202		8 August 2006	Allianz Arena	0–3	Friendly	
203		26 January 2008	Allianz Arena	1–1	Friendly	66,000
204		27 February 2008	Allianz Arena	1–0	DFB-Pokal	69,000

== Overall match statistics ==
Statistics Bayern – 1860 in official matches and friendly matches
Competition	Bayern wins	Draws	1860 wins	Total
Bundesliga	23	7	8	38
Oberliga Süd	13	7	8	28
Bezirksliga	7	7	6	20
Münchner Stadtmeisterschaft	1	0	1	2
A-Klasse	8	1	0	9
Gau	4	2	1	7
Gauliga	12	7	5	24
Gaumeisterschaft	3	2	3	8
Kreisliga	3	3	3	9
Ostkreisliga	5	1	0	6
Süddeutsche Meisterschaft	2	0	2	4
DFB-Pokal	2	2	0	4
DFB-Ligapokal	2	0	0	2
Münchner Pokal	0	0	2	2
Süddeutscher Pokal	1	1	0	2
Friendly match	18	10	11	39
Total	104	50	50	204

== Results involving reserve teams ==
With the two senior teams playing in different leagues the meetings between the two reserve sides of the clubs, nowadays in the tier four Regionalliga Bayern, have received increased attention. The most recent derbies have attracted almost capacity crowds of 12,500 in the Grünwalder Stadium, but also made heavy police presence necessary to deal with the rival fan fractions. The games have also, on occasion, been broadcast live on television.

The games of the reserve sides of the two clubs since the introduction of the Regionalligas in 1994:

Season	League	Teams	Home	Away
1997–98	Regionalliga Süd (III)	FC Bayern Munich II – TSV 1860 Munich II	2–2	1–3
1998–99	Regionalliga Süd	FC Bayern Munich II – TSV 1860 Munich II	3–1	1–0
1999–2000	Regionalliga Süd	FC Bayern Munich II – TSV 1860 Munich II	1–3	3–4
2000–01	Regionalliga Süd	FC Bayern Munich II – TSV 1860 Munich II	0–0	3–0
2004–05	Regionalliga Süd	FC Bayern Munich II – TSV 1860 Munich II	4–2	1–1
2005–06	Regionalliga Süd	FC Bayern Munich II – TSV 1860 Munich II	1–0	2–2
2005–06	Bavarian Cup	FC Bayern Munich II – TSV 1860 Munich II	2–4	
2006–07	Regionalliga Süd	FC Bayern Munich II – TSV 1860 Munich II	1–1	1–1
2007–08	Regionalliga Süd	FC Bayern Munich II – TSV 1860 Munich II	1–0	2–3
2011–12	Regionalliga Süd (IV)	FC Bayern Munich II – TSV 1860 Munich II	1–2	1–0
2012–13	Regionalliga Bayern (IV)	FC Bayern Munich II – TSV 1860 Munich II	0–1	2–0
2013–14	Regionalliga Bayern	FC Bayern Munich II – TSV 1860 Munich II	2–0	1–2
2014–15	Regionalliga Bayern	FC Bayern Munich II – TSV 1860 Munich II	1–0	3–1
2015–16	Regionalliga Bayern	FC Bayern Munich II – TSV 1860 Munich II	0–0	0–2
2016–17	Regionalliga Bayern	FC Bayern Munich II – TSV 1860 Munich II	0–0	0–2

The games between first team of 1860 Munich and reserve side of Bayern Munich:

Season	League	Teams	Home	Away
1982–83	Bayernliga (III)	FC Bayern Munich II – TSV 1860 Munich	0–2	1–1
1982–83	DFB-Pokal	FC Bayern Munich II – TSV 1860 Munich	0–1	
1983–84	Bayernliga (III)	FC Bayern Munich II – TSV 1860 Munich	0–0	0–2
1984–85	Bayernliga (III)	FC Bayern Munich II – TSV 1860 Munich	1–1	1–1
1985–86	Bayernliga (III)	FC Bayern Munich II – TSV 1860 Munich	2–2	0–2
1986–87	Bayernliga (III)	FC Bayern Munich II – TSV 1860 Munich	1–1	2–2
1986–87	Bayernliga (III)	FC Bayern Munich II – TSV 1860 Munich (play-off for 2nd place)	3–0	
1987–88	Bayernliga (III)	FC Bayern Munich II – TSV 1860 Munich	2–1	1–2
1988–89	Bayernliga (III)	FC Bayern Munich II – TSV 1860 Munich	3–3	2–1
1989–90	Bayernliga (III)	FC Bayern Munich II – TSV 1860 Munich	2–2	0–3
1990–91	Bayernliga (III)	FC Bayern Munich II – TSV 1860 Munich	0–2	0–1
1992–93	Bayernliga (III)	FC Bayern Munich II – TSV 1860 Munich	1–1	0–1
2017–18	Regionalliga Bayern (IV)	FC Bayern Munich II – TSV 1860 Munich	1–0	3–1
2019–20	3. Liga (III)	FC Bayern Munich II – TSV 1860 Munich	1–1	2–1
2020–21	3. Liga (III)	FC Bayern Munich II – TSV 1860 Munich	0–2	2–2

== Crossing town ==
Players who appeared for both clubs:

- (Weimar Republic) (Nazi Germany) Franz Krumm
- (Nazi Germany) (Germany) Georg Bayerer
- (Germany) Peter Grosser
- (Germany) Karl-Heinz Mrosko
- (Germany) Franz Gerber
- (Germany) Jupp Kapellmann
- (Germany) Michael Hecht
- (Germany) Udo Horsmann
- (Germany) Ludwig Kögl
- (Germany) Rainer Aigner
- (Germany) Matthias Hamann
- (Germany) Reiner Maurer
- (Germany) Gerald Hillringhaus
- (Belgium) Robert Dekeyser
- (Germany) Manfred Bender
- (Germany) Manfred Schwabl
- (Germany) Jens Jeremies
- (Austria) Harald Cerny
- (Germany) Dennis Grassow
- (Germany) Michael Wiesinger
- (Germany) Steffen Hofmann
- (Turkey) Berkant Göktan
- (Germany) Antonio Di Salvo
- (Germany) Andreas Görlitz
- (Croatia) Ivica Olić
