= 2003 DFB-Ligapokal =

- Tournament programme cover

Tournament details
- Country: Germany
- Teams: 6

Final positions
- Champions: Hamburger SV
- Runners-up: Borussia Dortmund

Tournament statistics
- Matches played: 5
- Goals scored: 19 (3.8 per match)
- Top goal scorer(s): Marcio Amoroso; Michael Ballack; Jan Koller; Bernardo Romeo (2)

The 2003 DFB-Ligapokal was the seventh edition of the DFB-Ligapokal. It was won by Hamburger SV, who beat Borussia Dortmund 4–2 in the final, securing their first title.

== Participating clubs ==
A total of six teams qualified for the competition. The labels in the parentheses show how each team qualified for the place of its starting round:

- 1st, 2nd, 3rd, 4th, etc.: League position
- CW: Cup winners
- TH: Title holders

Semi-finals
Bayern Munich (1st + CW)	VfB Stuttgart (2nd)
Preliminary round
Borussia Dortmund (3rd)	Hertha BSC^{TH} (5th)
Hamburger SV (4th)	VfL Bochum (9th) (Note: The 9th placed team of the 2002–03 Bundesliga, VfL Bochum, qualified as teams from 6th to 8th (Werder Bremen, Schalke 04, and VfL Wolfsburg) were involved in the 2003 UEFA Intertoto Cup during the same period.)

== Matches ==
=== Preliminary round ===
16 July 2003
20:30

Borussia Dortmund	2–1	VfL Bochum
Rosický 30'; Amoroso 33'	Report	Hashemian 38'

Lohrheidestadion, Bochum
Attendance: 11,000
Referee: Peter Sippel

17 July 2003
20:30

Hamburger SV	2–1	Hertha BSC
Maltritz 9'; Rahn 71'	Report	Bobic 37'

Paul Greifzu Stadium, Dessau
Attendance: 9,000
Referee: Uwe Kemmling

=== Semi-finals ===
21 July 2003
20:30

Borussia Dortmund	1–0	VfB Stuttgart
Koller 43'	Report

Städtisches Waldstadion, Aalen
Attendance: 11,211
Referee: Jörg Keßler

22 July 2003
20:30

Bayern Munich	3–3	Hamburger SV
Ballack 24' (pen.), 90' (pen.); Élber 69'	Report	Romeo 41', 52'; Barbarez 67'
Penalties
Salihamidžić (penalty scored); Ballack (penalty missed); Hargreaves (penalty missed)	1–4	(penalty scored) Rahn; (penalty scored) Hoogma; (penalty scored) Maltritz; (penalty scored) Mahdavikia

Ernst-Abbe-Sportfeld, Jena
Attendance: 11,900
Referee: Jürgen Jansen

=== Final ===
28 July 2003
20:30 CEST

Borussia Dortmund	2–4	Hamburger SV
Amoroso 24' (pen.); Koller 61'	Report	Hoogma 3'; Cardoso 12'; Takahara 18'; Beinlich 68'

Bruchwegstadion, Mainz
Attendance: 16,700
Referee: Jürgen Aust (Cologne)

== See also ==
- 2003–04 Bundesliga
- 2003–04 DFB-Pokal
