= Stefan Wächter =

German footballer

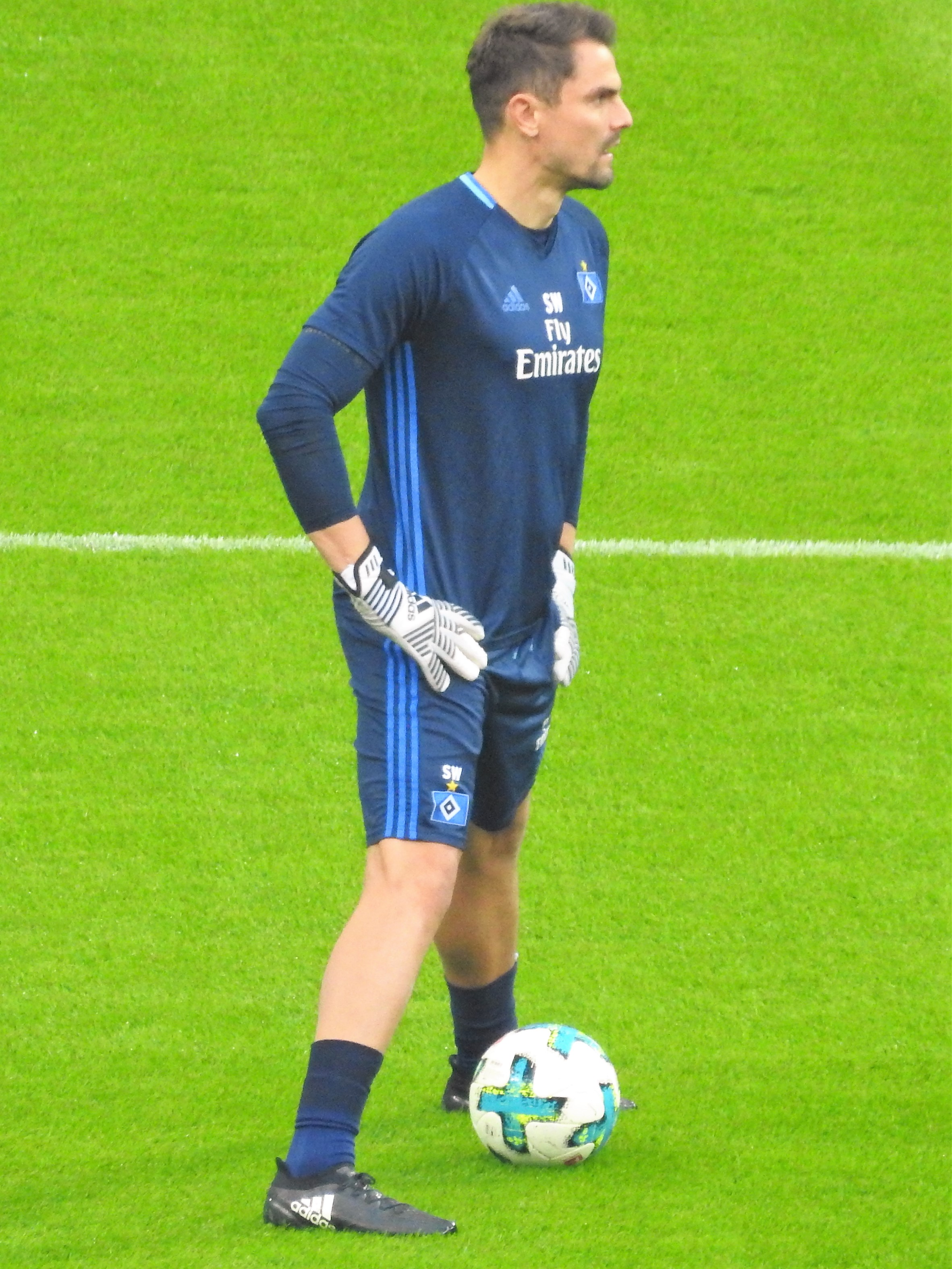
- Wächter in 2017

Personal information
- Date of birth: 20 April 1978 (age 48)
- Place of birth: Herne, West Germany
- Height: 1.90 m (6 ft 3 in)
- Position: Goalkeeper

Youth career
- –1994: Westfalia Herne
- 1994–1998: VfL Bochum

Senior career*
Years	Team	Apps	(Gls)
1998–2000	VfL Bochum II	57	(0)
2000–2001	KFC Uerdingen	20	(0)
2001–2007	Hamburger SV II	12	(0)
2001–2007	Hamburger SV	64	(0)
2007–2010	Hansa Rostock	28	(0)
Total		181	(0)

Managerial career
- 2011–2012: Victoria Hamburg (goalkeeping coach)
- 2014: Hamburger SV (youth coordinator)
- 2014–2018: Hamburger SV (goalkeeping coach)
- * Club domestic league appearances and goals

Stefan Wächter (born 20 April 1978) is a German former professional footballer, who played as a goalkeeper, and a goalkeeper coach. He was most recently the goalkeeper coach of Hamburger SV.

== Career ==
Wächter was contracted to Hamburger SV from 2001 to 2007, making 64 appearances in the Bundesliga and 22 in European competitions. In 2005, under manager Thomas Doll, he became number one goalkeeper at the club, ahead of Martin Pieckenhagen, whose understudy he had been for years. He lost his starting place at Hamburger SV to former Schalke 04 keeper Frank Rost, and after the season it was announced he had joined Rostock as their starting keeper, to accompany them in the Bundesliga. In 2008 he tore his cruciate ligament and after three operations was forced to retire from playing at the age of 32.

== Later life ==
After his retirement Wächter studied sports management and founded a drinks company selling apple cider.

== Career statistics ==
Appearances and goals by club, season and competition
Club	Season	League			National cup		League cup		Europe		Total	
Club	Season	Division	Apps	Goals	Apps	Goals	Apps	Goals	Apps	Goals	Apps	Goals
VfL Bochum II	1998–99	Regionalliga West/Südwest	22	0	—		—		—		22	0
VfL Bochum II	1999–2000	Regionalliga West/Südwest	35	0	—		—		—		35	0
VfL Bochum II	Total		57	0	—		—		—		57	0
VfL Bochum	1996–97	Bundesliga	0	0	0	0	—		0	0	0	0
VfL Bochum	1997–98	Bundesliga	0	0	0	0	—		0	0	0	0
VfL Bochum	1998–99	Bundesliga	0	0	—		—		—		0	0
VfL Bochum	1999–2000	2. Bundesliga	0	0	0	0	—		—		0	0
VfL Bochum	Total		0	0	0	0	—		0	0	57	0
KFC Uerdingen 05	2000–01	Regionalliga Nord	20	0	—		—		—		20	0
Hamburger SV II	2001–02	Oberliga Hamburg / S-H	4	0	—		—		—		4	0
Hamburger SV II	2002–03	Regionalliga Nord	5	0	—		—		—		5	0
Hamburger SV II	2003–04	Regionalliga Nord	1	0	—		—		—		1	0
Hamburger SV II	2004–05	Regionalliga Nord	2	0	—		—		—		2	0
Hamburger SV II	Total		12	0	—		—		—		12	0
Hamburger SV	2001–02	Bundesliga	0	0	0	0	—		—		0	0
Hamburger SV	2002–03	Bundesliga	0	0	0	0	—		—		0	0
Hamburger SV	2003–04	Bundesliga	24	0	2	0	0	0	—		26	0
Hamburger SV	2004–05	Bundesliga	11	0	0	0	—		2 (Note: Appearances in the UEFA Intertoto Cup)	0	13	0
Hamburger SV	2005–06	Bundesliga	20	0	2	0	—		16 (Note: Appearances in the UEFA Intertoto Cup and UEFA Cup)	0	38	0
Hamburger SV	2006–07	Bundesliga	9	0	0	0	1	0	4 (Note: Appearances in the UEFA Champions League)	0	14	0
Hamburger SV	Total		64	0	4	0	1	0	22	0	91	0
Hansa Rostock II	2008–09	Regionalliga Nord	1	0	—		—		—		1	0
Hansa Rostock	2007–08	Bundesliga	28	0	3	0	—		—		31	0
Hansa Rostock	2008–09	2. Bundesliga	0	0	0	0	—		—		0	0
Hansa Rostock	Total		28	0	3	0	—		—		31	0
Career Total			181	0	7	0	1	0	22	0	211	0

== Honours ==
Hamburger SV

- DFL-Ligapokal: 2003
- UEFA Intertoto Cup: 2005
