= Eren Şen =

German-Turkish footballer (born 1984)

Personal information
- Date of birth: 28 September 1984 (age 42)
- Place of birth: Hamburg, Germany
- Height: 1.82 m (6 ft 0 in)
- Position: Midfielder

Youth career
- 1993–1995: FSV Harburg
- 1995–1999: FC St. Pauli
- 1999–2003: Hamburger SV

Senior career*
Years	Team	Apps	(Gls)
2002–2005	Hamburger SV II	65	(6)
2003	Hamburger SV	1	(0)
2005–2006	FC Thun	21	(4)
2006–2009	Konyaspor	21	(3)
2009	Diyarbakırspor	3	(0)
2010	1. FC Magdeburg	7	(1)
2011	Mersin İdmanyurdu	5	(0)

International career
2002–2003	Germany U-19	3	(1)
- * Club domestic league appearances and goals as of 16:46, 7 September 2011 (UTC)

Eren Şen (born 28 September 1984 in Hamburg) is a German-Turkish football player.

He started his playing career in the youth teams of FSV Harburg, later joining FC St. Pauli and Hamburger SV, and made his debut in professional football in 2003 for Hamburger SV. Later he played for FC Thun in Switzerland where he played in the UEFA Champions League and UEFA Cup. In 2006, he joined the Turkish club Konyaspor, staying on until 2009 when he left for Diyarbakırspor. Due to a long-time injury and financial troubles, he played in only seven matches for his last club and eventually returned to Germany for both treatment and rehabilitation. After training with Hamburger SV II to stay fit, Eren Şen signed a contract with Regionalliga Nord side 1. FC Magdeburg that was meant to keep him at the club until 2011, with an option to extend the contract for another year. However, this contract was dissolved in December due to dissatisfaction with the situation on both sides.

== Honours ==
Hamburger SV

- DFL-Ligapokal: 2003
