= Marcel Maltritz =

German footballer

Personal information
- Full name: Marcel Maltritz
- Date of birth: 2 October 1978 (age 48)
- Place of birth: Magdeburg, East Germany
- Height: 1.86 m (6 ft 1 in)
- Positions: Centre-back; midfielder

Youth career
- 1984–1986: TuS Magdeburg-Neustadt
- 1986–1997: 1. FC Magdeburg

Senior career*
Years	Team	Apps	(Gls)
1996–1998	1. FC Magdeburg	72	(16)
1998–2001	VfL Wolfsburg	49	(0)
2001–2004	Hamburger SV	63	(2)
2002–2003	→ Hamburger SV II	2	(0)
2004–2014	VfL Bochum	302	(18)
2009	→ VfL Bochum II	1	(0)
Total		489	(36)

International career
1998–2000	Germany U-21	10	(0)
2003–2004	Germany B	4	(0)
Medal record
1. FC Magdeburg
Winner	NOFV-Oberliga Süd	1996–97
Winner	Saxony-Anhalt Cup	1997–98
Hamburger SV
Winner	DFB-Ligapokal	2003
VfL Bochum
Winner	2. Bundesliga	2005–06
Third place	2. Bundesliga	2010–11
- * Club domestic league appearances and goals

Marcel Maltritz (born 2 October 1978) is a German retired professional footballer who played as a centre-back.

== Career ==
=== 1. FC Magdeburg ===
On 2 October 1978, Maltritz was born in Magdeburg (then East Germany). He first played for TuS Magdeburg-Neustadt (until 1986) and then joined the 1. FC Magdeburg. He played for this club from 1986 until 1998. 1. FC Magdeburg played on the highest level in the GDR but after the German reunification the club finished 10th in the final season of the DDR-Oberliga and was thus only qualified for the NOFV-Oberliga Mitte on the third level of the reunified German league pyramid. When Maltritz left the club in December 1998 they played in the Regionalliga. At the end of the season 1. FC Magdeburg was relegated to the fourth level.

=== VfL Wolfsburg ===
The VfL Wolfsburg was newly promoted to the Bundesliga when Maltritz joined the club in the winter break 1998–99. Wolfsburg, financially supported by Volkswagen, developed very well and even reached the third round of the UEFA Cup in the 1999–2000 season. At the end of the 2000–01 season Maltritz left the club and went to Hamburger SV.

=== Hamburger SV ===
Hamburger SV is one of the traditional major clubs in the Bundesliga. In the 2002–03 season the club from the north finished fourth and qualified for the 2003–04 UEFA Cup. On 28 July 2003, Maltritz won his first major trophy: the 2003 German League Cup. At the end of the 2003–04 season Maltritz moved to VfL Bochum.

=== VfL Bochum ===
The VfL Bochum had just finished its most successful season with a fifth place and qualification to the UEFA Cup when Maltritz joined the club. But the club was eliminated in the first round of the 2004–05 UEFA Cup by Standard Liège and even relegated to the 2. Bundesliga at the end of the season. Maltritz stayed loyal to his club and helped Bochum to promote directly back to the highest level. In the 2006–07 season VfL Bochum finished at the eighth place, which was the third best Bundesliga result in club history.

== Career statistics ==
Appearances and goals by club, season and competition
Club	Season	League			DFB-Pokal		DFB-Ligapokal		Europe		Other		Total	
Club	Season	Division	Apps	Goals	Apps	Goals	Apps	Goals	Apps	Goals	Apps	Goals	Apps	Goals
1. FC Magdeburg	1995–96	NOFV-Oberliga Nord	3	0	—		—		—		—		3	0
1. FC Magdeburg	1996–97	NOFV-Oberliga Süd	22	5	—		—		—		—		22	5
1. FC Magdeburg	1997–98	Regionalliga Nordost	30	6	—		—		—		—		30	6
1. FC Magdeburg	1998–99	Regionalliga Nordost	17	5	1	0	—		—		—		18	5
1. FC Magdeburg	Total		72	16	1	0	0	0	0	0	0	0	73	16
VfL Wolfsburg	1998–99	Bundesliga	15	0	0	0	—		—		—		15	0
VfL Wolfsburg	1999–00	Bundesliga	23	0	2	0	—		4	0	—		29	0
VfL Wolfsburg	2000–01	Bundesliga	11	0	2	0	—		2	0	—		15	0
VfL Wolfsburg	Total		49	0	4	0	0	0	6	0	0	0	59	0
Hamburger SV	2001–02	Bundesliga	22	0	1	0	—		—		—		23	0
Hamburger SV	2002–03	Bundesliga	23	1	2	1	0	0	—		—		25	2
Hamburger SV	2003–04	Bundesliga	18	1	3	1	3	2	2	0	—		26	4
Hamburger SV	Total		63	2	6	2	3	2	2	0	0	0	74	6
Hamburger SV II	2002–03	Regionalliga Nord	2	0	—		—		—		—		2	0
VfL Bochum	2004–05	Bundesliga	27	3	2	0	1	0	2	1	—		32	4
VfL Bochum	2005–06	2. Bundesliga	29	2	1	0	—		—		—		30	2
VfL Bochum	2006–07	Bundesliga	31	2	3	0	—		—		—		34	2
VfL Bochum	2007–08	Bundesliga	31	2	2	0	—		—		—		33	2
VfL Bochum	2008–09	Bundesliga	28	0	2	0	—		—		—		30	0
VfL Bochum	2009–10	Bundesliga	29	0	2	0	—		—		—		31	0
VfL Bochum	2010–11	2. Bundesliga	32	3	1	0	—		—		2 (Note: Appearances in 2. Bundesliga/Bundesliga promotion/relegation playoffs)	0	35	3
VfL Bochum	2011–12	2. Bundesliga	31	1	3	0	—		—		—		34	1
VfL Bochum	2012–13	2. Bundesliga	31	3	3	2	—		—		—		34	5
VfL Bochum	2013–14	2. Bundesliga	33	2	2	0	—		—		—		35	2
VfL Bochum	Total		302	18	21	2	1	0	2	1	2	0	328	21
VfL Bochum II	2008–09	Regionalliga West	1	0	—		—		—		—		1	0
Career total			489	36	32	4	4	2	10	1	2	0	537	43

== Honours ==
Hamburger SV

- DFL-Ligapokal: 2003
