= 2007 DFL-Ligapokal =

- Tournament programme cover

Tournament details
- Country: Germany
- Teams: 6

Final positions
- Champions: Bayern Munich
- Runners-up: Schalke 04

Tournament statistics
- Matches played: 5
- Goals scored: 15 (3 per match)
- Top goal scorer: Franck Ribéry (3)

The 2007 DFL-Ligapokal was the 11th and final edition of the DFL-Ligapokal. The competition could not be scheduled in 2008, due to fixture congestion caused by UEFA Euro 2008, and did not return in 2009. An unofficial Super Cup ran in these years, and was made official in 2010, as the DFL-Supercup.

The 2007 Ligapokal saw a minor format change, with the 2. Bundesliga champions (in this case, Karlsruher SC) entering in place of the fifth-placed Bundesliga team. The title was won by Bayern Munich, who secured their sixth win with a 1–0 victory over Schalke 04.

== Participating clubs ==
A total of six teams qualified for the competition. The labels in the parentheses show how each team qualified for the place of its starting round:

- 1st, 2nd, 3rd, 4th, etc.: League position
- CW: Cup winners
- 2BL: 2. Bundesliga champions
- TH: Title holders

Semi-finals
VfB Stuttgart (1st)	1. FC Nürnberg (CW)
Preliminary round
Schalke 04 (2nd)	Bayern Munich (4th)
Werder Bremen^{TH} (3rd)	Karlsruher SC (2BL)

== Matches ==
=== Preliminary round ===
21 July 2007
20:00

Schalke 04	1–0	Karlsruher SC
Altıntop 35'	Report

LTU-Arena, Düsseldorf
Attendance: 51,500
Referee: Marc Seemann

21 July 2007
18:00

Werder Bremen	1–4	Bayern Munich
Borowski 9'	Report	Schweinsteiger 23'; Altıntop 27'; Ribéry 35', 54'

LTU-Arena, Düsseldorf
Attendance: 51,500
Referee: Thorsten Kinhöfer

=== Semi-finals ===
24 July 2007
20:30

1. FC Nürnberg	2–4	Schalke 04
Vittek 20', 73'	Report	Kobiashvili 38'; Ernst 43'; Løvenkrands 45'; Westermann 58'

Frankenstadion, Nuremberg
Attendance: 25,200
Referee: Jochen Drees

25 July 2007
20:30

VfB Stuttgart	0–2	Bayern Munich
	Report	Ribéry 8'; Wagner 66'

Gottlieb-Daimler-Stadion, Stuttgart
Attendance: 45,500
Referee: Babak Rafati

=== Final ===
28 July 2007
18:00 CEST

Bayern Munich	1–0	Schalke 04
Klose 29'	Report

Zentralstadion, Leipzig
Attendance: 43,500
Referee: Florian Meyer (Burgdorf)

== See also ==
- 2007–08 Bundesliga
- 2007–08 DFB-Pokal
