= Martin Pieckenhagen =

German footballer (born 1971)

- Pieckenhagen with Heracles Almelo in 2009

Personal information
- Date of birth: 15 November 1971 (age 55)
- Place of birth: East Berlin, East Germany
- Height: 1.86 m (6 ft 1 in)
- Position: Goalkeeper

Team information
- Current team: Hansa Rostock (sporting director)

Youth career
- 1978–1980: Medizin Berlin-Buch
- 1980–1991: Union Berlin

Senior career*
Years	Team	Apps	(Gls)
1991–1993	Union Berlin	43	(0)
1993–1994	Tennis Borussia Berlin	8	(0)
1994–1996	MSV Duisburg	15	(0)
1996–2001	Hansa Rostock	110	(0)
2001–2005	Hamburger SV	100	(0)
2005–2010	Heracles Almelo	165	(1)
2010–2011	Mainz 05	1	(0)
2011	Mainz 05 II	3	(0)
Total		445	(1)

Managerial career
- 2015–2016: Mecklenburg Schwerin
- * Club domestic league appearances and goals

Martin Pieckenhagen (born 15 November 1971 in East Berlin) is a German former professional footballer. He is the sporting director of Hansa Rostock.

Over the course of his career, he played for 1. FC Union Berlin, Tennis Borussia Berlin, MSV Duisburg, Hansa Rostock, Hamburger SV, Heracles Almelo, and 1. FSV Mainz 05. He absolved 215 games in the German Bundesliga.

== After retiring ==
After retiring, Pieckenhagen started as a youth coach at 1. FSV Mainz 05. In the beginning of 2013, Pieckenhagen worked as the assistant coach of SV Waren 09. He only worked there until the summer 2013, where he was released.

On 21 January 2014, Pieckenhagen was appointed as the sporting director at FC Mecklenburg Schwerin. The contract was only for six months, and it was further extended after the six months.

From January 2015 to 13 October 2016, Pieckenhagen was also the manager of the club alongside his sporting director role. He left the club on 9 May 2017, to join Würzburger Kickers.

On 9 May 2017, Pieckenhagen was hired by Würzburger Kickers as a goalkeeper coach.

On 5 January 2019, Pieckenhagen was appointed as the sporting director of F.C. Hansa Rostock.

== Honours ==
Hamburger SV

- DFL-Ligapokal: 2003
