= 1973 DFB-Ligapokal final =

German League Cup
- Match programme cover
- Event: 1972–73 DFB-Ligapokal
Hamburger SV	Borussia Mönchengladbach
4	0
- Date: 6 June 1973
- Venue: Volksparkstadion, Hamburg
- Referee: Franz Wengenmayer (Munich)
- Attendance: 30,000

The 1973 DFB-Ligapokal final decided the winner of the 1972–73 DFB-Ligapokal, a knockout football cup competition.

The match was played on 6 June 1973 at the Volksparkstadion in Hamburg. Hamburger SV won the match 4–0 against Borussia Mönchengladbach for the title.

== Teams ==
Team	League
Hamburger SV	Bundesliga
Borussia Mönchengladbach	Bundesliga

== Route to the final ==
Ticket from the match.

The DFB-Ligapokal began with the group stage. Four teams would play each other in a home and away format, with the group winners advancing to the knockout stage. The knockout stage, beginning with the quarter-finals was a knockout cup competition. Teams would play each other home and away, and the winner on aggregate would advance. If tied on aggregate, extra time was used to determine the winner. If still tied, a replay would be necessary.

Note: In all results below, the score of the finalist is given first (H: home; A: away).

Hamburger SV				Round	Borussia Mönchengladbach			
Opponent	Result			Group stage	Opponent	Result		
FC St. Pauli	4–1 (A)			Matchday 1	Rot-Weiss Essen	1–0 (A)		
Wacker 04 Berlin	2–3 (H)			Matchday 2	Schwarz-Weiß Essen	6–0 (A)		
Hertha BSC	1–0 (H)			Matchday 3	MSV Duisburg	3–3 (H)		
Wacker 04 Berlin	5–3 (A)			Matchday 4	Schwarz-Weiß Essen	3–1 (H)		
Hertha BSC	5–4 (A)			Matchday 5	MSV Duisburg	0–0 (A)		
FC St. Pauli	0–0 (H)			Matchday 6	Rot-Weiss Essen	1–1 (H)		
Group 2 winners: Pos / Team / Pld / Pts; 1 / Hamburger SV / 6 / 9; 2 / FC St. Pauli / 6 / 7; 3 / Hertha BSC / 6 / 4; 4 / Wacker 04 Berlin / 6 / 4; Source: Kicker				Final standings	Group 5 winners: Pos / Team / Pld / Pts; 1 / Borussia Mönchengladbach / 6 / 9; 2 / Rot-Weiss Essen / 6 / 7; 3 / MSV Duisburg / 6 / 6; 4 / Schwarz-Weiß Essen / 6 / 2; Source: Kicker			
Opponent	Agg.	1st leg	2nd leg	Knockout stage	Opponent	Agg.	1st leg	2nd leg
Eintracht Braunschweig	3–2	1–2 (A)	2–0 (H)	Quarter-finals	Arminia Bielefeld	12–3	3–0 (A)	9–3 (H)
Schalke 04	4–2	0–1 (A)	4–1 (a.e.t.) (H)	Semi-finals	Eintracht Frankfurt	3–2	3–1 (H)	0–1 (A)

== Match ==
=== Details ===
6 June 1973
19:30 CET

Hamburger SV	4–0	Borussia Mönchengladbach
Memering 15'; Nogly 19'; Hönig 37'; Hidien 83'	Report

Volksparkstadion, Hamburg
Attendance: 30,000
Referee: Franz Wengenmayer (Munich)

Hamburger SV	Borussia Mönchengladbach

GK	1	(West Germany) Rudi Kargus
RB		(West Germany) Manfred Kaltz
CB		(West Germany) Peter Nogly
CB		(West Germany) Willi Schulz
LB		(West Germany) Peter Hidien	(substituted off) 85'
CM		(West Germany) Klaus Zaczyk
CM		(Denmark) Ole Bjørnmose
CM		(West Germany) Franz-Josef Hönig
RW		(West Germany) Caspar Memering	(substituted off) 81'
CF		(West Germany) Horst Heese
LW		(West Germany) Georg Volkert
Substitutes:
DF		(West Germany) Peter Krobbach	(substituted on) 85'
MF		(West Germany) Klaus Winkler	(substituted on) 81'
Manager:
(West Germany) Klaus-Dieter Ochs

GK	1	(West Germany) Wolfgang Kleff
RB		(West Germany) Uli Stielike
CB		(West Germany) Rainer Bonhof
CB		(West Germany) Klaus-Dieter Sieloff
LB		(West Germany) Berti Vogts
CM		(West Germany) Dietmar Danner
CM		(West Germany) Christian Kulik
CM		(West Germany) Günter Netzer
RW		(Denmark) Henning Jensen	(substituted off) 63'
CF		(West Germany) Bernd Rupp
LW		(West Germany) Jupp Heynckes
Substitutes:
FW		(Denmark) Allan Simonsen	(substituted on) 63'
Manager:
(West Germany) Hennes Weisweiler
