= Bernardo Romeo =

Argentine retired footballer (born 1977)

Personal information
- Full name: Bernardo Daniel Romeo
- Date of birth: 10 September 1977 (age 49)
- Place of birth: Tandil, Argentina
- Height: 1.74 m (5 ft 9 in)
- Position: Striker

Youth career
- Estudiantes LP

Senior career*
Years	Team	Apps	(Gls)
1995–1998	Estudiantes LP	40	(4)
1998–2002	San Lorenzo	97	(60)
2002–2005	Hamburger SV	77	(35)
2005	→ Mallorca (loan)	10	(2)
2005–2007	Osasuna	32	(4)
2007–2010	San Lorenzo	58	(16)
2010–2011	Quilmes	17	(4)
2011–2012	San Lorenzo	14	(1)
Total		345	(126)

International career
1996–1997	Argentina U20	20	(9)
2000–2003	Argentina	4	(1)
- * Club domestic league appearances and goals

Bernardo Daniel Romeo (born 10 September 1977) is an Argentine former footballer who played as a striker.

He amassed Argentine Primera División totals of 226 games and 85 goals, mainly in the service of San Lorenzo with whom he had three spells. He also spent four seasons in Germany with Hamburger SV, in a 17-year professional career.

== Club career ==
Born in Tandil, Buenos Aires Province, Romeo started his professional career in 1995 with Estudiantes de La Plata, playing exactly 40 Primera División matches. He blossomed as a top-rate player with San Lorenzo de Almagro, scoring 15 goals in only 17 matches in 2001's Clausura, in an eventual league conquest.

Romeo's performances caught the eye of German club Hamburger SV, and he continued to net at ease abroad, in two complete seasons plus two halves, but came out empty in silverware (a DFB-Ligapokal notwithstanding). In January 2005, he was loaned to RCD Mallorca for six months, after which he was released.

Having signed with another team in Spain and La Liga, CA Osasuna, in July 2005, Romeo scored four times in 24 matches as the Navarrese finished fourth, a best ever (tied). In the following season he was only a backup or third-string, ending up playing in as much games in the league and in the UEFA Cup, netting against Odense Boldklub in a 3–1 home win with his team eventually reaching the last-four in the latter competition.

In the summer of 2007, Romeo returned to Argentina and San Lorenzo, going on to eventually score more than 100 official goals (both spells combined) for them. He was released in July 2010, signing with freshly promoted Quilmes Atlético Club.

== International career ==
Romeo was influential as Argentina won the 1997 FIFA World Youth Championship, scoring six times in seven contests in Malaysia. He received, however, only four caps with the senior side during three years.

== Honours ==
=== Club ===
San Lorenzo

- Argentine Primera División: Clausura 2001 (also top scorer)
- Copa Mercosur: 2001 (also top scorer)

Hamburger SV

- DFL-Ligapokal: 2003

=== Country ===
Argentina U20

- FIFA U-20 World Cup: 1997
- South American Youth Championship: 1997
