= Christian Rahn =

German footballer

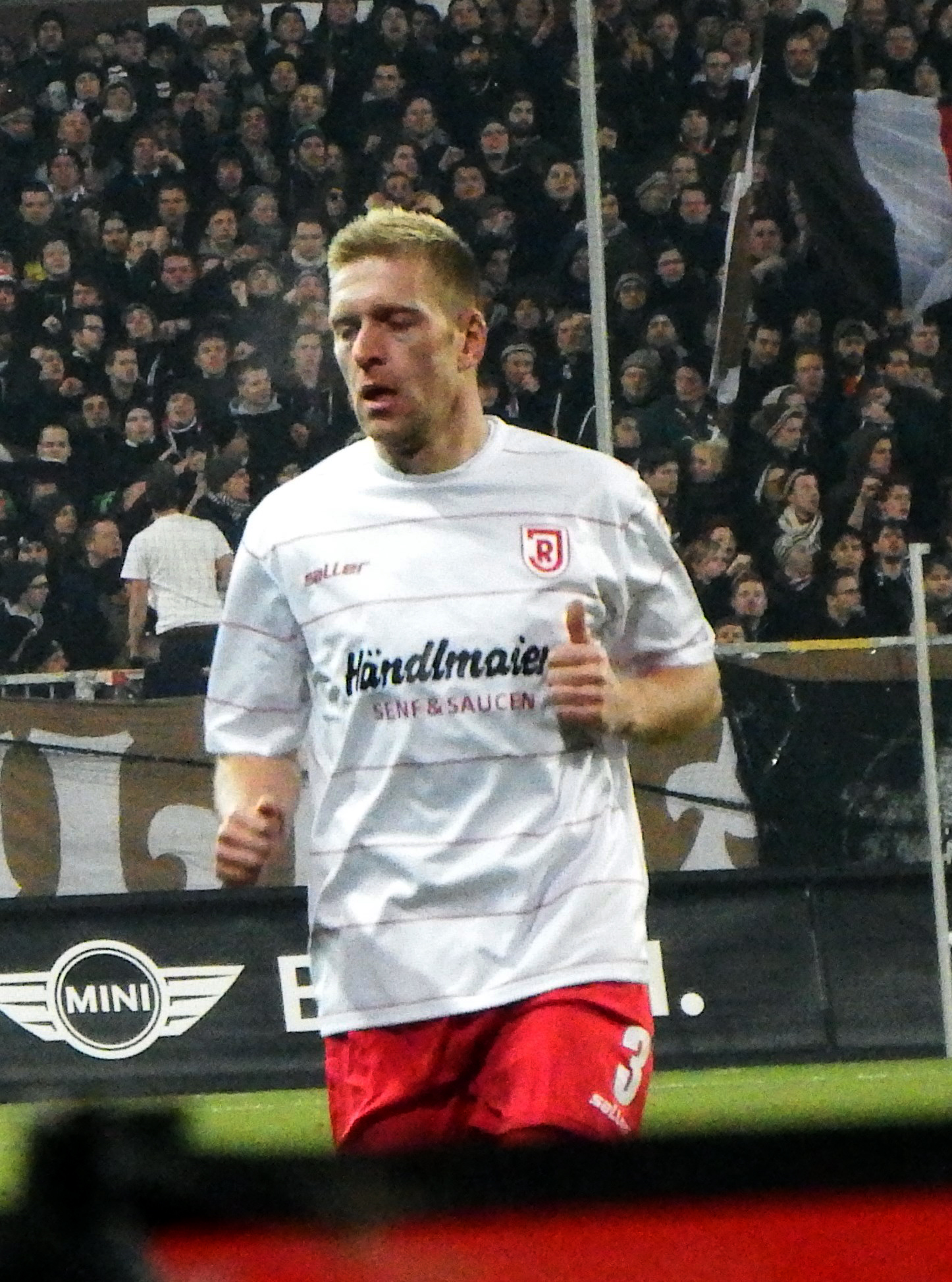
- Rahn playing for Jahn Regensburg in 2013

Personal information
- Date of birth: 15 June 1979 (age 47)
- Place of birth: Hamburg, West Germany
- Height: 1.85 m (6 ft 1 in)
- Positions: Left-back; midfielder

Team information
- Current team: FC St. Pauli II
- Number: 6

Youth career
- –1994: Altona 93
- 1994–1996: FC St. Pauli

Senior career*
Years	Team	Apps	(Gls)
1996–2002	FC St. Pauli	79	(4)
2002–2005	Hamburger SV	46	(8)
2005–2006	1. FC Köln	29	(1)
2006–2008	Hansa Rostock	66	(9)
2009–2012	Greuther Fürth	35	(0)
2012–2013	Jahn Regensburg	21	(3)
2013–2015	FC St. Pauli II	36	(0)
Total		312	(25)

International career
2002–2004	Germany	5	(0)
- * Club domestic league appearances and goals

Christian Rahn (born 15 June 1979) is a German former professional footballer who played as a left-back.

== Club career ==
Born in Hamburg, Rahn began his career at FC St. Pauli and has had spells at Hamburger SV and 1. FC Köln. On 15 December 2008, he was released by FC Hansa Rostock. After this, he joined SpVgg Greuther Fürth. After being released by Fürth, he joined Jahn Regensburg on 2 August 2012. Following Regensburg's relegation from the 2. Bundesliga he rejoined his childhood club St. Pauli, playing for and also captaining their reserve squad.

== International career ==
On 9 May 2002, Rahn made his debut for the Germany national team in a 7–0 friendly victory in preparation for the 2002 FIFA World Cup against Kuwait. Five days later he was not used for a 1–0 defeat in Cardiff against Wales and one day later Rudi Völler announced that Rahn would not participate in the World Cup. On 31 March 2004, Rahn was called up again for the national team for a 3–0 victory in Cologne against Belgium when he replaced Michael Ballack in the 84th minute. Rahn was initially named in Völler's UEFA Euro 2004 squad, but had to withdraw through injury and was replaced by Christian Ziege.

== Honours ==
Hamburger SV

- DFL-Ligapokal: 2003
