= Rodolfo Cardoso (footballer, born 1968) =

Argentine former football midfielder

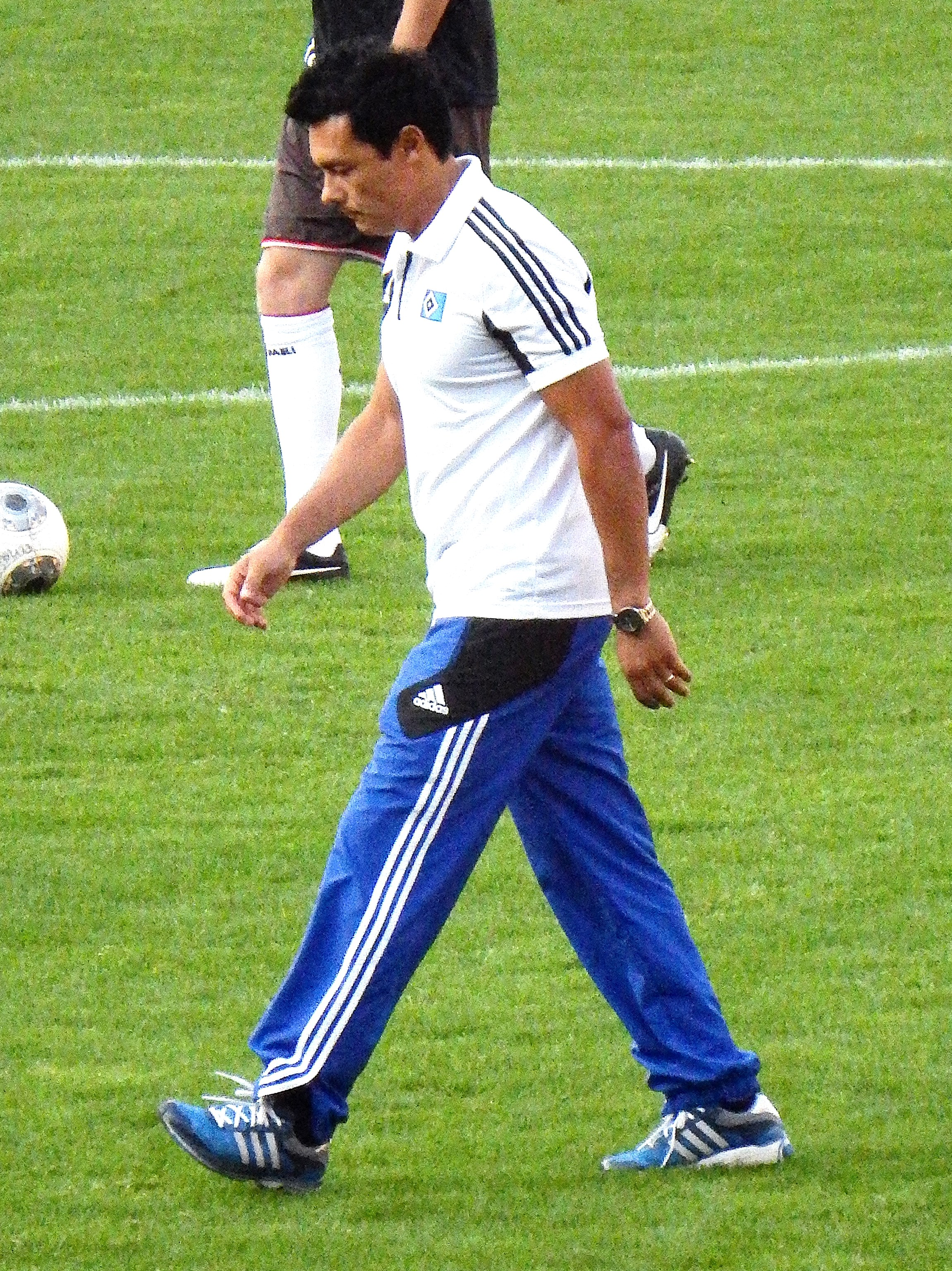
- Cardoso in 2013

Personal information
- Full name: Rodolfo Esteban Cardoso
- Date of birth: 17 October 1968 (age 58)
- Place of birth: Azul, Argentina
- Height: 1.78 m (5 ft 10 in)
- Position: Midfielder

Youth career
- AC Azul
- Estudiantes

Senior career*
Years	Team	Apps	(Gls)
1987–1989	Estudiantes	75	(9)
1989–1993	FC Homburg	125	(13)
1993–1995	SC Freiburg	63	(28)
1995–1996	Werder Bremen	32	(2)
1997–2004	Hamburger SV	111	(17)
1998	→ Boca Juniors (loan)	11	(1)
1998–1999	→ Estudiantes (loan)	34	(4)
Total		451	(74)

International career
1995–1998	Argentina	8	(1)

Managerial career
- 2005–2008: Hamburger SV (youth)
- 2008: Hamburger SV (U19)
- 2009–2011: Hamburger SV II
- 2011: Hamburger SV (assistant caretaker)
- 2011: Hamburger SV II
- 2011: Hamburger SV (caretaker)
- 2011: Hamburger SV (assistant caretaker)
- 2011–2013: Hamburger SV II
- 2013: Hamburger SV (caretaker)
- 2013–2014: Hamburger SV II
- 2014–2015: Hamburger SV (U16)
- 2015: Hamburger SV II (caretaker)
- 2015: Hamburger SV (U16)
- 2015–2018: Hamburger SV (scout)
- 2018: Hamburger SV (assistant caretaker)
- * Club domestic league appearances and goals

Rodolfo Esteban Cardoso (born 17 October 1968) is an Argentine former football midfielder who spent the majority of his playing career in Germany. He was head coach of the reserve team of Hamburger SV between 2008 and 2014. He was most recently the assistant coach of Hamburger SV.

== Club career ==
Born in Azul, Cardoso started his professional playing career in 1987 with Estudiantes de La Plata. In 1989, he was signed by German side FC Homburg. He went on to play for SC Freiburg and Werder Bremen before joining Hamburger SV in 1997.

Between 1998 and 1999, he returned to Argentina on loan to Boca Juniors and then Estudiantes de La Plata. He returned to Germany in 1999 and continued playing for the club until his retirement in 2004.

== International career ==
In 1997 Cardoso was selected to join the Argentina squad for Copa América.

== Coaching career ==
Cardoso became head coach of Hamburger SV II on 18 December 2008 after Karsten Bäron and his assistant coach Frank Pieper were dismissed. Cardoso became assistant coach of the first team on 14 March 2011. He returned to the reserve team on 1 July 2011 only to return to the first team as interim head coach on 19 September 2011 when Michael Oenning was sacked. Cardoso, who didn't have the appropriate coaching licence, wasn't allowed to continue in his role as interim head coach and was relegated to assistant coach on 11 October 2011. Frank Arnesen took over as interim head coach. He returned to the reserve team on 17 October 2011. He was in that position until he was once again interim head coach of the first team from 17 September 2013 until 24 September 2013 when Bert van Marwijk was hired as the new head coach. He returned to the position until the end of the 2013–14 season. On 31 March 2015, he returned to the reserve team of Hamburg. He became the third coach of the season.

Cardoso left Hamburger SV on 12 March 2018.

== Coaching record ==
As of 31 March 2015

Team	From	To	Record					
Team	From	To	M	W	D	L	Win %	Ref.
Hamburger SV II	18 December 2008	14 March 2011	91	35	23	33	38.46	
Hamburger SV II	1 July 2011	19 September 2011	6	5	0	1	83.33	
Hamburger SV	19 September 2011	11 October 2011	2	1	0	1	50.00	
Hamburger SV II	17 October 2011	17 September 2013	61	17	13	31	27.87	
Hamburger SV	17 September 2013	24 September 2013	2	1	0	1	50.00	
Hamburger SV II	24 September 2013	30 June 2014	27	6	9	12	22.22	
Hamburger SV II	31 March 2015	Present	0	0	0	0	—	
Total			189	65	45	79	34.39	—

== Honours ==
Hamburger SV

- DFL-Ligapokal: 2003
