= Nico-Jan Hoogma =

Dutch footballer

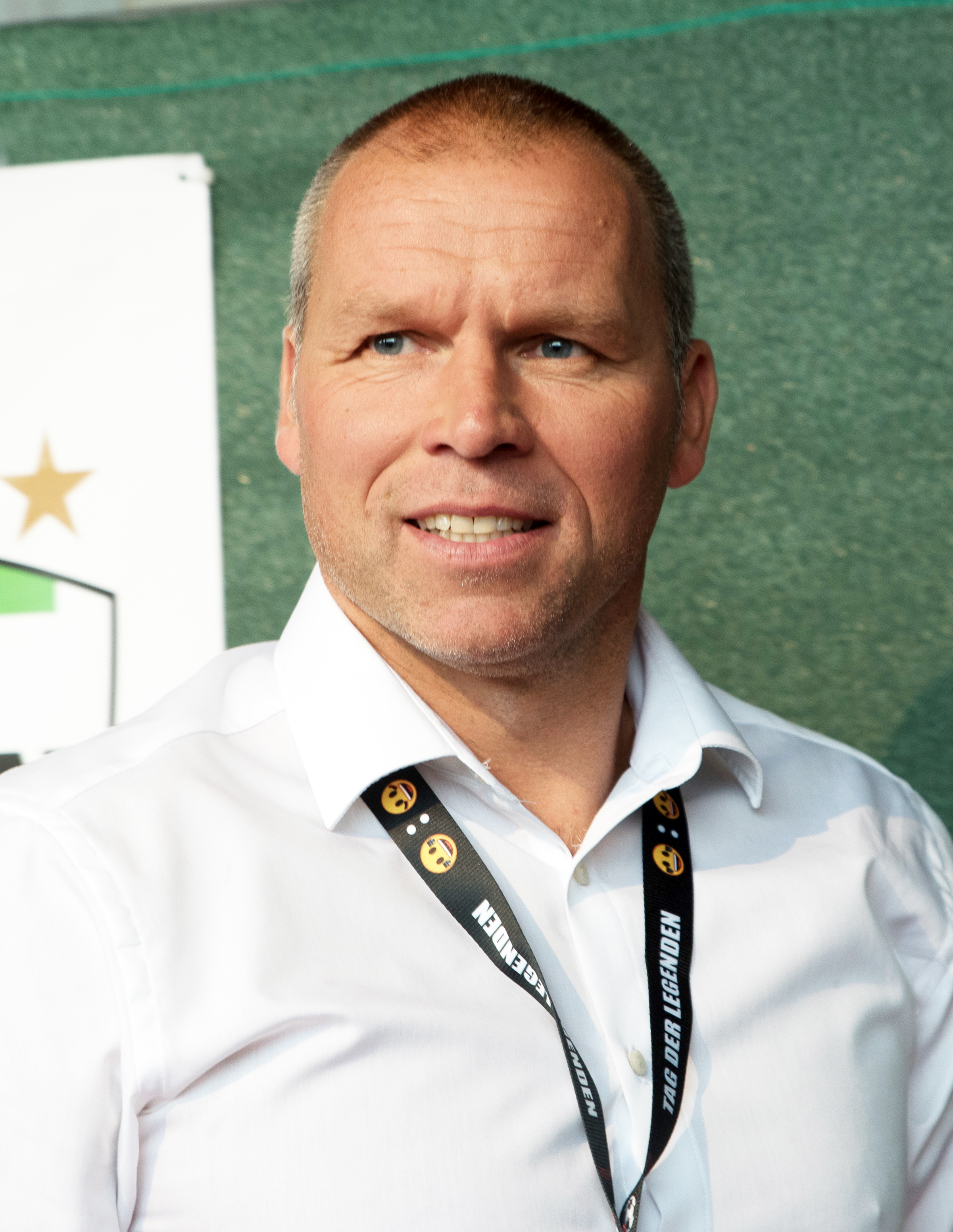
- Hoogma in 2016

Personal information
- Date of birth: 26 October 1968 (age 58)
- Place of birth: Heerenveen, Netherlands
- Height: 1.85 m (6 ft 1 in)
- Position: Defender

Youth career
- -1985: VV Drachten
- 1985-1988: Cambuur
- 1988-1989: VV Drachten

Senior career*
Years	Team	Apps	(Gls)
1989–1992	Cambuur	98	(10)
1992–1998	Twente	187	(18)
1998–2004	Hamburger SV	177	(13)
2004–2006	Heracles	55	(2)
Total		517	(43)
- * Club domestic league appearances and goals

Nico-Jan Hoogma (born 26 October 1968) is a Dutch retired footballer who played as a defender. Raised in Drachten, he started his professional career with SC Cambuur and after three years moved to FC Twente. In 1998, he moved to Germany, where he played for Hamburger SV, before seeing out his career with Heracles Almelo, aged 38.

Between 1 Januari 2007 and 1 March 2018 he was managing director at Heracles Almelo. Since 1 March 2018, he was Director of Football at the Royal Netherlands Football Association, until he left in June 2022 and was replaced by Nigel de Jong in 2023. He returned to Heracles to pick up a position as technical director, only to leave them in 2025.

== Personal life ==
Hoogma is the father of footballer Justin Hoogma.

As of 2026, Hoogma works as a sales manager for a software company.

== Honours ==
- DFB-Ligapokal: 2003
