= 2002–03 Bundesliga =

40th season of the Bundesliga

Bundesliga
- Season: 2002–03
- Dates: 9 August 2002 – 24 May 2003
- Champions: Bayern Munich; 17th Bundesliga title 18th German title
- Relegated: Arminia Bielefeld; 1. FC Nürnberg; Energie Cottbus
- Champions League: Bayern Munich; Stuttgart; Borussia Dortmund
- UEFA Cup: Hamburger SV; Hertha BSC; Kaiserslautern
- Intertoto Cup: Werder Bremen; Schalke 04; Wolfsburg
- Matches: 306
- Goals: 821 (2.68 per match)
- Top goalscorer: Thomas Christiansen; Giovane Élber (21 goals each)

The 2002–03 Bundesliga was the 40th season of the Bundesliga. It began on 9 August 2002 and concluded on 24 May 2003. This was the first season where the defending champions kicked–off the opening match.

== Teams ==
Eighteen teams competed in the league – the top fifteen teams from the previous season and the three teams promoted from the 2. Bundesliga. The promoted teams were Hannover 96, Arminia Bielefeld and VfL Bochum, returning to the top flight after an absence of thirteen, two and one years respectively. They replaced SC Freiburg, 1. FC Köln and FC St. Pauli after spending time in the top flight for four, two and one years respectively.

== Team overview ==
Location of teams in Bundesliga 2002–03

=== Stadiums ===
Club	Location	Ground	Capacity
Hertha BSC	Berlin	Olympiastadion	76,000
Arminia Bielefeld*	Bielefeld	Stadion Alm	26,600
VfL Bochum*	Bochum	Ruhrstadion	36,000
SV Werder Bremen	Bremen	Weserstadion	36,000
FC Energie Cottbus	Cottbus	Stadion der Freundschaft	21,000
Borussia Dortmund	Dortmund	Westfalenstadion	68,600
Hamburger SV	Hamburg	AOL Arena	62,000
Hannover 96*	Hanover	Niedersachsenstadion	60,400
1. FC Kaiserslautern	Kaiserslautern	Fritz Walter Stadion	41,500
Bayer 04 Leverkusen	Leverkusen	BayArena	22,500
Borussia Mönchengladbach	Mönchengladbach	Bökelbergstadion	34,500
TSV 1860 Munich	Munich	Olympiastadion	63,000
FC Bayern Munich	Munich	Olympiastadion	63,000
1. FC Nürnberg	Nuremberg	Frankenstadion	44,700
FC Hansa Rostock	Rostock	Ostseestadion	25,850
FC Schalke 04	Gelsenkirchen	Arena AufSchalke	61,973
VfB Stuttgart	Stuttgart	Gottlieb-Daimler-Stadion	53,700
VfL Wolfsburg	Wolfsburg	VfL-Stadion am Elsterweg; Volkswagen Arena^{1}	21,600; 30,000

(*) Promoted from 2. Bundesliga.

^{1} VfL Wolfsburg played their first seven home matches at the VfL Stadion before permanently moving to the Volkswagen Arena.

=== Personnel and sponsoring ===
Team	Manager	Kit manufacturer	Shirt sponsor
TSV 1860 Munich	(Germany) Falko Götz	Nike	Liqui Moly
Arminia Bielefeld	(Germany) Benno Möhlmann	Uhlsport	KiK
Bayer 04 Leverkusen	(Germany) Klaus Augenthaler	Adidas	RWE
FC Bayern Munich	(Switzerland) Ottmar Hitzfeld	Adidas	T-Mobile
VfL Bochum	(Germany) Peter Neururer	Nike	DWS
Borussia Dortmund	(Germany) Matthias Sammer	Goool.de	E.ON
Borussia Mönchengladbach	(Germany) Ewald Lienen	Reebok	Jever
FC Energie Cottbus	(Germany) Eduard Geyer	Jako	enviaM
Hamburger SV	(Austria) Kurt Jara	Nike	TV Spielfilm
Hannover 96	(Germany) Ralf Rangnick	Uhlsport	TUI Group
FC Hansa Rostock	(Germany) Armin Veh	Jako	Vita Cola
Hertha BSC	(Netherlands) Huub Stevens	Nike	Arcor
1. FC Kaiserslautern	(Belgium) Eric Gerets	Nike	Deutsche Vermögensberatung
1. FC Nürnberg	(Germany) Wolfgang Wolf	Adidas	Entrium Direct Bankers
FC Schalke 04	(Belgium) Marc Wilmots	Adidas	Victoria Versicherung
VfB Stuttgart	(Germany) Felix Magath	Puma	Debitel
SV Werder Bremen	(Germany) Thomas Schaaf	Kappa	Young Spirit
VfL Wolfsburg	(Germany) Jürgen Röber	Puma	Volkswagen

== League table ==
The final table of the 1st Bundesliga, Season 2002/03

Pos	Team	Pld	W	D	L	GF	GA	GD	Pts	Qualification or relegation
1	Bayern Munich (C)	34	23	6	5	70	25	+45	75	Qualification to Champions League group stage
2	VfB Stuttgart	34	17	8	9	53	39	+14	59	Qualification to Champions League group stage
3	Borussia Dortmund	34	15	13	6	51	27	+24	58	Qualification to Champions League third qualifying round
4	Hamburger SV	34	15	11	8	46	36	+10	56	Qualification to UEFA Cup first round
5	Hertha BSC	34	16	6	12	52	43	+9	54	Qualification to UEFA Cup first round
6	Werder Bremen	34	16	4	14	51	50	+1	52	Qualification to Intertoto Cup third round
7	Schalke 04	34	12	13	9	46	40	+6	49	Qualification to Intertoto Cup third round
8	VfL Wolfsburg	34	13	7	14	39	42	−3	46	Qualification to Intertoto Cup second round
9	VfL Bochum	34	12	9	13	55	56	−1	45	
10	1860 Munich	34	12	9	13	44	52	−8	45	
11	Hannover 96	34	12	7	15	47	57	−10	43	
12	Borussia Mönchengladbach	34	11	9	14	43	45	−2	42	
13	Hansa Rostock	34	11	8	15	35	41	−6	41	
14	1. FC Kaiserslautern	34	10	10	14	40	42	−2	40	Qualification to UEFA Cup first round
15	Bayer Leverkusen	34	11	7	16	47	56	−9	40	
16	Arminia Bielefeld (R)	34	8	12	14	35	46	−11	36	Relegation to 2. Bundesliga
17	1. FC Nürnberg (R)	34	8	6	20	33	60	−27	30	Relegation to 2. Bundesliga
18	Energie Cottbus (R)	34	7	9	18	34	64	−30	30	Relegation to 2. Bundesliga

Source: bundesliga.de
Rules for classification: 1) points; 2) goal difference; 3) number of goals scored.
(C) Champions; (R) Relegated

== Results ==
Home \ Away	BSC	DSC	BOC	SVW	FCE	BVB	HSV	H96	FCK	B04	BMG	M60	FCB	FCN	ROS	S04	VFB	WOB
Hertha BSC	—	0–0	1–0	0–1	3–1	2–1	2–0	2–0	2–0	1–1	1–2	6–0	3–6	2–1	3–1	4–2	1–1	2–2
Arminia Bielefeld	0–1	—	1–3	3–0	2–2	0–0	2–1	0–1	1–1	2–2	4–1	2–1	0–0	0–1	3–0	2–1	0–1	1–0
VfL Bochum	3–0	0–3	—	1–4	5–0	0–0	1–1	1–2	1–1	2–1	1–1	1–1	1–4	2–1	0–1	0–2	3–1	4–2
Werder Bremen	4–2	2–2	2–0	—	0–1	1–4	2–1	1–2	5–3	3–2	2–0	1–2	2–0	4–1	0–0	2–1	3–1	0–1
Energie Cottbus	0–2	2–1	2–1	0–1	—	0–4	0–0	3–0	1–3	1–1	1–1	3–4	0–2	2–1	0–4	0–1	2–3	0–1
Borussia Dortmund	2–2	0–0	4–1	1–2	1–1	—	1–1	2–0	3–1	2–0	1–0	1–0	1–0	4–1	2–0	1–1	3–1	2–2
Hamburger SV	1–0	1–0	1–1	1–0	1–1	1–1	—	2–1	2–0	4–1	1–0	1–0	0–3	4–0	2–0	3–1	3–2	2–0
Hannover 96	0–1	0–0	2–2	4–4	1–3	0–3	2–2	—	2–1	1–2	2–2	1–3	2–2	4–2	3–1	0–2	1–2	3–1
1. FC Kaiserslautern	2–1	1–1	0–2	1–0	4–0	0–0	2–0	0–1	—	1–0	2–0	0–0	0–2	5–0	1–0	1–3	1–2	2–0
Bayer Leverkusen	4–1	3–1	2–4	3–0	0–3	1–1	2–3	1–3	1–0	—	2–2	3–0	2–1	0–2	1–2	1–3	0–1	1–1
Borussia Mönchengladbach	0–2	3–0	2–2	4–1	3–0	1–0	2–0	1–0	3–0	2–2	—	0–1	0–0	2–0	3–0	2–2	1–1	2–0
1860 Munich	1–0	3–1	2–4	3–0	3–0	0–0	1–1	0–1	0–0	0–3	2–0	—	0–5	2–2	0–2	3–0	0–1	2–2
Bayern Munich	2–0	6–2	4–1	0–1	3–1	2–1	1–1	3–3	1–0	3–0	3–0	3–1	—	2–0	1–0	0–0	2–1	1–0
1. FC Nürnberg	0–3	0–0	1–3	1–0	2–2	1–2	1–3	3–1	1–0	0–1	2–1	1–2	1–2	—	0–1	0–0	1–2	1–1
Hansa Rostock	0–1	3–0	1–1	1–0	0–0	0–1	0–0	1–2	2–2	1–3	3–1	1–4	0–1	2–0	—	3–1	1–1	1–0
Schalke 04	0–0	1–1	1–2	1–1	3–0	2–2	3–0	0–2	2–2	0–1	2–1	1–1	1–0	1–1	2–2	—	2–0	1–0
VfB Stuttgart	3–1	3–0	3–2	0–1	0–0	1–0	1–1	3–0	1–1	3–0	4–0	4–1	0–3	0–2	1–1	1–1	—	2–0
VfL Wolfsburg	2–0	2–0	2–0	3–1	3–2	2–0	2–1	1–0	2–2	2–0	1–0	1–1	0–2	0–2	1–0	1–2	1–2	—

Source: DFB
Legend: Blue = home team win; Yellow = draw; Red = away team win.

== Overall ==
- Most wins - Bayern Munich (23)
- Fewest wins - Energie Cottbus (7)
- Most draws - Borussia Dortmund and Schalke 04 (13)
- Fewest draws - Werder Bremen (4)
- Most losses - 1. FC Nürnberg (20)
- Fewest losses - Bayern Munich (5)
- Most goals scored - Bayern Munich (70)
- Fewest goals scored - 1. FC Nürnberg (33)
- Most goals conceded - Energie Cottbus (64)
- Fewest goals conceded - Bayern Munich (25)

== Top goalscorers ==
Rank	Player	Club	Goals
1	(Brazil) Giovane Élber	Bayern Munich	21
1	(Spain) (Denmark) Thomas Christiansen	VfL Bochum	21
3	(Brazil) Aílton	Werder Bremen	16
4	(Germany) (Panama) Kevin Kurányi	VfB Stuttgart	15
4	(Peru) (Italy) Claudio Pizarro	Bayern Munich	15
6	(Brazil) Marcelinho	Hertha BSC	14
6	(Germany) Markus Schroth	1860 Munich	14
6	(Germany) (Slovenia) Fredi Bobic	Hannover 96	14
6	(Argentina) (Italy) Bernardo Romeo	Hamburger SV	14
10	(Germany) Benjamin Lauth	1860 Munich	13
10	(Czech Republic) Jan Koller	Borussia Dortmund	13

=== Hat-tricks ===
Player	Club	Against	Result	Date
(Brazil) Giovane Élber^{4}	Bayern Munich	Arminia Bielefeld	6–2	17 August 2002
(Spain) Thomas Christiansen	VfL Bochum	Energie Cottbus	5–0	17 August 2002
(Brazil) Aílton	Werder Bremen	1. FC Nürnberg	4–1	10 September 2002
(Germany) Kevin Kurányi	VfB Stuttgart	Arminia Bielefeld	3–0	22 September 2002
(Romania) Ionel Ganea	VfB Stuttgart	VfL Bochum	3–1	8 November 2002
(Germany) Markus Schroth	1860 Munich	Hansa Rostock	4–1	25 January 2003
(Cameroon) Mohammadou Idrissou	Hannover 96	1. FC Nürnberg	4–2	8 February 2003
(Germany) Mehmet Scholl	Bayern Munich	1860 Munich	5–0	15 February 2003
(Senegal) Mamadou Diabang	Arminia Bielefeld	Borussia Mönchengladbach	4–1	15 March 2003
(Brazil) Giovane Élber	Bayern Munich	Hertha BSC	6–3	10 May 2003

- ^{4} Player scored 4 goals

== Attendances ==
No.	Team	Average	Change	Highest
1	Borussia Dortmund	67,800	2,5%	68,600
2	Schalke 04	60,583	0,2%	60,886
3	Bayern München	51,882	-2,4%	69,000
4	Hamburger SV	45,625	2,7%	55,516
5	Hertha BSC	42,101	14,8%	59,200
6	Hannover 96	36,496	77,5%	48,696
7	1. FC Kaiserslautern	36,250	-5,9%	40,500
8	VfB Stuttgart	34,569	23,0%	54,267
9	Werder Bremen	32,869	9,2%	40,200
10	Borussia Mönchengladbach	28,921	-4,3%	34,500
11	1. FC Nürnberg	28,238	-7,9%	44,600
12	TSV 1860	26,312	-0,2%	64,000
13	VfL Bochum	25,002	99,2%	32,645
14	Arminia Bielefeld	23,269	70,7%	26,601
15	Bayer Leverkusen	22,500	0,5%	22,500
16	Hansa Rostock	19,853	7,2%	30,000
17	VfL Wolfsburg	19,229	35,4%	30,000
18	Energie Cottbus	13,090	-21,3%	18,250
