= 1972–73 DFB-Ligapokal =

Tournament details
- Country: West Germany
- Teams: 32

Final positions
- Champions: Hamburger SV
- Runners-up: Borussia Mönchengladbach

Tournament statistics
- Matches played: 109
- Goals scored: 460 (4.22 per match)

The 1972–73 DFB-Ligapokal was the first season of the DFB Ligapokal. It began on 5 July 1972 and ended on 6 June 1973.

== Group stage ==
=== Group 1 ===
| Team | Pld | W | D | L | GF | GA | GD | Pts |
|---|---|---|---|---|---|---|---|---|
| Eintracht Braunschweig | 6 | 5 | 0 | 1 | 16 | 6 | +10 | 10 |
| Hannover 96 | 6 | 3 | 1 | 2 | 12 | 9 | +3 | 7 |
| Eintracht Gelsenkirchen | 6 | 1 | 2 | 3 | 10 | 16 | −6 | 4 |
| Rot-Weiß Oberhausen | 6 | 1 | 1 | 4 | 10 | 17 | −7 | 3 |

=== Group 2 ===
| Team | Pld | W | D | L | GF | GA | GD | Pts |
|---|---|---|---|---|---|---|---|---|
| Hamburger SV | 6 | 4 | 1 | 1 | 17 | 11 | +6 | 9 |
| FC St. Pauli | 6 | 3 | 1 | 2 | 10 | 11 | −1 | 7 |
| Hertha BSC | 6 | 2 | 0 | 4 | 15 | 13 | +2 | 4 |
| Wacker 04 Berlin | 6 | 2 | 0 | 4 | 13 | 20 | −7 | 4 |

=== Group 3 ===
| Team | Pld | W | D | L | GF | GA | GD | Pts |
|---|---|---|---|---|---|---|---|---|
| Arminia Bielefeld | 6 | 3 | 1 | 2 | 13 | 8 | +5 | 7 |
| Borussia Dortmund | 6 | 2 | 3 | 1 | 11 | 9 | +2 | 7 |
| SV Werder Bremen | 6 | 2 | 3 | 1 | 14 | 17 | −3 | 7 |
| VfL Osnabrück | 6 | 1 | 1 | 4 | 7 | 11 | −4 | 3 |

=== Group 4 ===
| Team | Pld | W | D | L | GF | GA | GD | Pts |
|---|---|---|---|---|---|---|---|---|
| FC Schalke 04 | 6 | 5 | 0 | 1 | 16 | 9 | +7 | 10 |
| VfL Bochum | 6 | 4 | 0 | 2 | 13 | 10 | +3 | 8 |
| SpVgg Erkenschwick | 6 | 3 | 0 | 3 | 10 | 9 | +1 | 6 |
| KSV Hessen Kassel | 6 | 0 | 0 | 6 | 7 | 18 | −11 | 0 |

=== Group 5 ===
| Team | Pld | W | D | L | GF | GA | GD | Pts |
|---|---|---|---|---|---|---|---|---|
| Borussia Mönchengladbach | 6 | 3 | 3 | 0 | 14 | 5 | +9 | 9 |
| Rot-Weiss Essen | 6 | 3 | 1 | 2 | 15 | 9 | +6 | 7 |
| MSV Duisburg | 6 | 2 | 2 | 2 | 12 | 11 | +1 | 6 |
| Schwarz-Weiss Essen | 6 | 1 | 0 | 5 | 8 | 24 | −16 | 2 |

=== Group 6 ===
| Team | Pld | W | D | L | GF | GA | GD | Pts |
|---|---|---|---|---|---|---|---|---|
| SC Fortuna Köln | 6 | 4 | 1 | 1 | 10 | 3 | +7 | 9 |
| Fortuna Düsseldorf | 6 | 4 | 0 | 2 | 14 | 9 | +5 | 8 |
| 1. FC Köln | 6 | 3 | 1 | 2 | 14 | 9 | +5 | 7 |
| Bayer 04 Leverkusen | 6 | 0 | 0 | 6 | 4 | 21 | −17 | 0 |

=== Group 7 ===
| Team | Pld | W | D | L | GF | GA | GD | Pts |
|---|---|---|---|---|---|---|---|---|
| Eintracht Frankfurt | 6 | 5 | 0 | 1 | 23 | 9 | +14 | 10 |
| Borussia Neunkirchen | 6 | 3 | 0 | 3 | 14 | 18 | +4 | 6 |
| 1. FC Kaiserslautern | 6 | 2 | 1 | 3 | 11 | 12 | −1 | 5 |
| 1. FSV Mainz 05 | 6 | 1 | 1 | 4 | 8 | 17 | −9 | 3 |

=== Group 8 ===
| Team | Pld | W | D | L | GF | GA | GD | Pts |
|---|---|---|---|---|---|---|---|---|
| FC Bayern Hof | 6 | 3 | 2 | 1 | 20 | 16 | +4 | 8 |
| VfB Stuttgart | 6 | 2 | 3 | 1 | 14 | 10 | +4 | 7 |
| FC Bayern Munich | 6 | 3 | 0 | 3 | 17 | 17 | 0 | 6 |
| TSV 1860 Munich | 6 | 1 | 1 | 4 | 11 | 19 | −8 | 3 |

== Knockout stage ==
=== Bracket ===
Quarter-finals
FC Bayern Hof | 3
FC Schalke 04 | 8
Eintracht Braunschweig | 2
Hamburger SV | 3
Arminia Bielefeld | 3
Borussia Mönchengladbach | 12
Eintracht Frankfurt | 6
SC Fortuna Köln | 5

Semi-finals
FC Schalke 04 | 2
Hamburger SV | 4
Borussia Mönchengladbach | 3
Eintracht Frankfurt | 2

Final
Hamburger SV | 4
Borussia Mönchengladbach | 0

=== Quarter-finals ===
| Team 1 | Agg. | Team 2 | 1st leg | 2nd leg |
|---|---|---|---|---|
| FC Bayern Hof | 3–8 | FC Schalke 04 | 1–1 | 2–7 |
| Eintracht Braunschweig | 2–3 | Hamburger SV | 2–1 | 0–2 |
| Arminia Bielefeld | 3–12 | Borussia Mönchengladbach | 0–3 | 3–9 |
| Eintracht Frankfurt | 6–5 | SC Fortuna Köln | 3–3 | 3–2 |

=== Semi-finals ===
| Team 1 | Agg. | Team 2 | 1st leg | 2nd leg |
|---|---|---|---|---|
| FC Schalke 04 | 2–4 | Hamburger SV | 1–0 | 1–4(aet) |
| Borussia Mönchengladbach | 3–2 | Eintracht Frankfurt | 3–1 | 0–1 |

=== Final ===
6 June 1973
19:30 CET

| Hamburger SV | 4–0 | Borussia Mönchengladbach |
|---|---|---|
| Memering 15'; Nogly 19'; Hönig 37'; Hidien 83' | Report |

Volksparkstadion, Hamburg
Attendance: 30,000
Referee: Franz Wengenmayer (Munich)

== See also ==
- 1972–73 DFB-Pokal
- 1972–73 Fußball-Bundesliga
- 1972–73 Fußball-Regionalliga
