= 2007–08 DFB-Pokal =

Tournament details
- Country: Germany
- Teams: 64

Final positions
- Champions: Bayern Munich
- Runners-up: Borussia Dortmund

Tournament statistics
- Matches played: 63
- Goals scored: 228 (3.62 per match)
- Top goal scorer: (Germany) Mario Gómez (6 goals)

The 2007–08 DFB-Pokal was the 65th season of the annual German football cup competition. 64 teams competed in the tournament of six rounds which began on 3 August 2007 and ended on 19 April 2008. In the final FC Bayern Munich defeated Borussia Dortmund 2–1 after extra time, thereby claiming their fourteenth title.

== Matches ==
Times up to 27 October 2007 and from 30 March 2008 are CEST (UTC+2). Times from 28 October 2007 to 29 March 2008 are CET (UTC+1).

=== First round ===
3 August 2007
TSG 1899 Hoffenheim	4–2	FC Augsburg	(AET)
4 August 2007
VfL Osnabrück	0–1	Borussia Mönchengladbach
SC Verl	0–3	TSV 1860 Munich
1. FC Magdeburg	1–4	Borussia Dortmund
SpVgg Unterhaching	0–3	Hertha BSC
SV Sandhausen	0–4	Kickers Offenbach
Rot-Weiss Ahlen	1–3	Hannover 96
SV Wilhelmshaven	0–4	1. FC Kaiserslautern
SV Hasborn	0–8	Hansa Rostock
Rot-Weiss Essen	2–2	Energie Cottbus	(AET) (Rot-Weiss Essen won 6–5 on penalties)
SV Wehen	1–2	VfB Stuttgart
Eintracht Braunschweig	0–1	SV Werder Bremen
FC St. Pauli	1–0	Bayer 04 Leverkusen
5 August 2007
1. FC Gera 03	0–3	FC Carl Zeiss Jena
SV Seligenporten	0–2	Arminia Bielefeld
TSG Neustrelitz	0–2	Karlsruher SC	(AET)
SC Victoria Hamburg	0–6	1. FC Nürnberg
Würzburger FV 04	0–4	VfL Wolfsburg
1. FC Normannia Gmünd	0–3	Alemannia Aachen
Wuppertaler SV Borussia	1–1	Erzgebirge Aue	(AET) (Wuppertaler SV won 4–3 on penalties)
Holstein Kiel	0–5	Hamburger SV
SV Werder Bremen II	4–2	1. FC Köln	(AET)
TSV Havelse	0–3	TuS Koblenz
Eintracht Trier	0–9	FC Schalke 04
1. FC Union Berlin	1–4	Eintracht Frankfurt
SV Babelsberg 03	0–4	MSV Duisburg
Bayer Leverkusen II	0–1	SC Paderborn 07
VfR Wormatia Worms	1–6	FSV Mainz 05
Dynamo Dresden	0–1	VfL Bochum
FC 08 Villingen	1–3	SC Freiburg
SV Darmstadt 98	1–3	SpVgg Greuther Fürth
6 August 2007
Wacker Burghausen	1–1	FC Bayern Munich	(AET) (FC Bayern Munich won 4–3 on penalties)

=== Second round ===
30 October 2007
SV Werder Bremen II	2–2	FC St. Pauli	(AET) (Bremen won 4–2 on penalties)
Wuppertaler SV Borussia	2–0	Hertha BSC
Alemannia Aachen	3–2	VfL Bochum
Hansa Rostock	6–0	Kickers Offenbach
TSV 1860 Munich	2–1	FSV Mainz 05
Karlsruher SC	0–1	VfL Wolfsburg
TSG 1899 Hoffenheim	2–1	SpVgg Greuther Fürth
FC Schalke 04	2–0	Hannover 96
31 October 2007
SV Werder Bremen	4–0	MSV Duisburg
Borussia Dortmund	2–1	Eintracht Frankfurt
FC Bayern Munich	3–1	Borussia Mönchengladbach
VfB Stuttgart	3–2	SC Paderborn
Hamburger SV	3–1	SC Freiburg
TuS Koblenz	1–2	Arminia Bielefeld
FC Carl Zeiss Jena	2–2	1. FC Nürnberg	(AET) (FC Carl Zeiss Jena won 5–4 on penalties)
Rot-Weiss Essen	2–1	1. FC Kaiserslautern

=== Round of 16 ===
29 January 2008
TSG 1899 Hoffenheim	2–1	Hansa Rostock
Alemannia Aachen	2–3	TSV 1860 Munich
Wuppertaler SV Borussia	2–5	FC Bayern Munich
Borussia Dortmund	2–1	SV Werder Bremen
30 January 2008
VfL Wolfsburg	1–1	Schalke 04	(AET) (VfL Wolfsburg won 5–3 on penalties)
SV Werder Bremen II	2–3	VfB Stuttgart
Rot-Weiss Essen	0–3	Hamburger SV
FC Carl Zeiss Jena	2–1	Arminia Bielefeld	(AET)

=== Quarter-finals ===
26 February 2008
Borussia Dortmund	3–1	TSG 1899 Hoffenheim
VfB Stuttgart	2–2	FC Carl Zeiss Jena	(AET) (FC Carl Zeiss Jena won 5–4 on penalties)
27 February 2008
VfL Wolfsburg	2–1	Hamburger SV	(AET)
FC Bayern Munich	1–0	TSV 1860 Munich	(AET)

=== Semi-finals ===
18 March 2008
Borussia Dortmund	3–0	FC Carl Zeiss Jena
19 March 2008
FC Bayern Munich	2–0	VfL Wolfsburg

=== Final ===
19 April 2008
20:00 CEST

Borussia Dortmund	1–2 (a.e.t.)	Bayern Munich
Petrić 90+2'	Report	Toni 11', 103'

Olympiastadion, Berlin
Attendance: 74,500
Referee: Knut Kircher (Rottenburg)
