= DFL-Ligapokal =

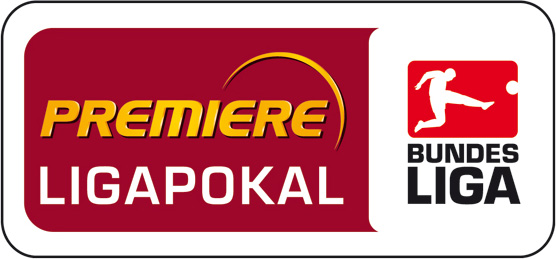
- Founded: 1997
- Abolished: 2007
- Region: Germany
- Teams: 6
- Related competitions: DFL-Supercup
- Last champions: Bayern Munich (6th title)
- Most championships: Bayern Munich (6 titles)
- Broadcaster: Sat.1 (2007)

The DFL-Ligapokal (German: [ˈdeː ʔɛf ɛlː liːgaːpoˈkaːl], officially Premiere Ligapokal [pʁəmiːeːʁə liːgaːpoˈkaːl], previously DFB-Ligapokal [ˈdeː ʔɛf beː liːgaːpoˈkaːl]) or the German League Cup was a German football competition that took place before the start of the Bundesliga season, featuring the top five teams of the previous Bundesliga season and the winners of the DFB-Pokal in Germany. The cup was known as the Premiere-Ligapokal after 2005, when Premiere, a German pay television network, took up sponsorship of the competition. The Ligapokal was not held in 2008 due to schedule crowding caused by the UEFA Euro 2008. Instead, the German Supercup was held on 23 July. The Ligapokal was not held in 2009 either, due to the German Football Association's decision to abolish it. In the final edition of the Ligapokal in 2007, the fifth-placed Bundesliga team (Bayer Leverkusen) was dropped from the competition, replaced by the winner of the 2. Bundesliga (Karlsruhe).

== Format ==
The design of the DFL-Ligapokal trophy

The Ligapokal was played between six teams, the top four teams of the Bundesliga, the DFB-Pokal winners, and the winner of the 2. Bundesliga. If a team was doubly qualified by also winning the German Cup, the number five team in the Bundesliga took the spare place.

The tournament was a knock-out competition played over three rounds with two matches in the first two rounds, and a single final in the last round. The current Bundesliga champions and the German Cup winners entered the tournament in the second round. If the Bundesliga champions were also the cup winner, the Bundesliga runner-up skipped the first round. The four remaining teams played one match to determine who qualified for the next round. The four teams in the second round then played one match to determine which teams qualified for the final. The first round matches and the final took place in neutral venues, in the semi-finals the Bundesliga champion and the Cup winner played at home. The matches lasted 90 minutes, with a penalty shootout immediately following if the match was tied.

== History ==
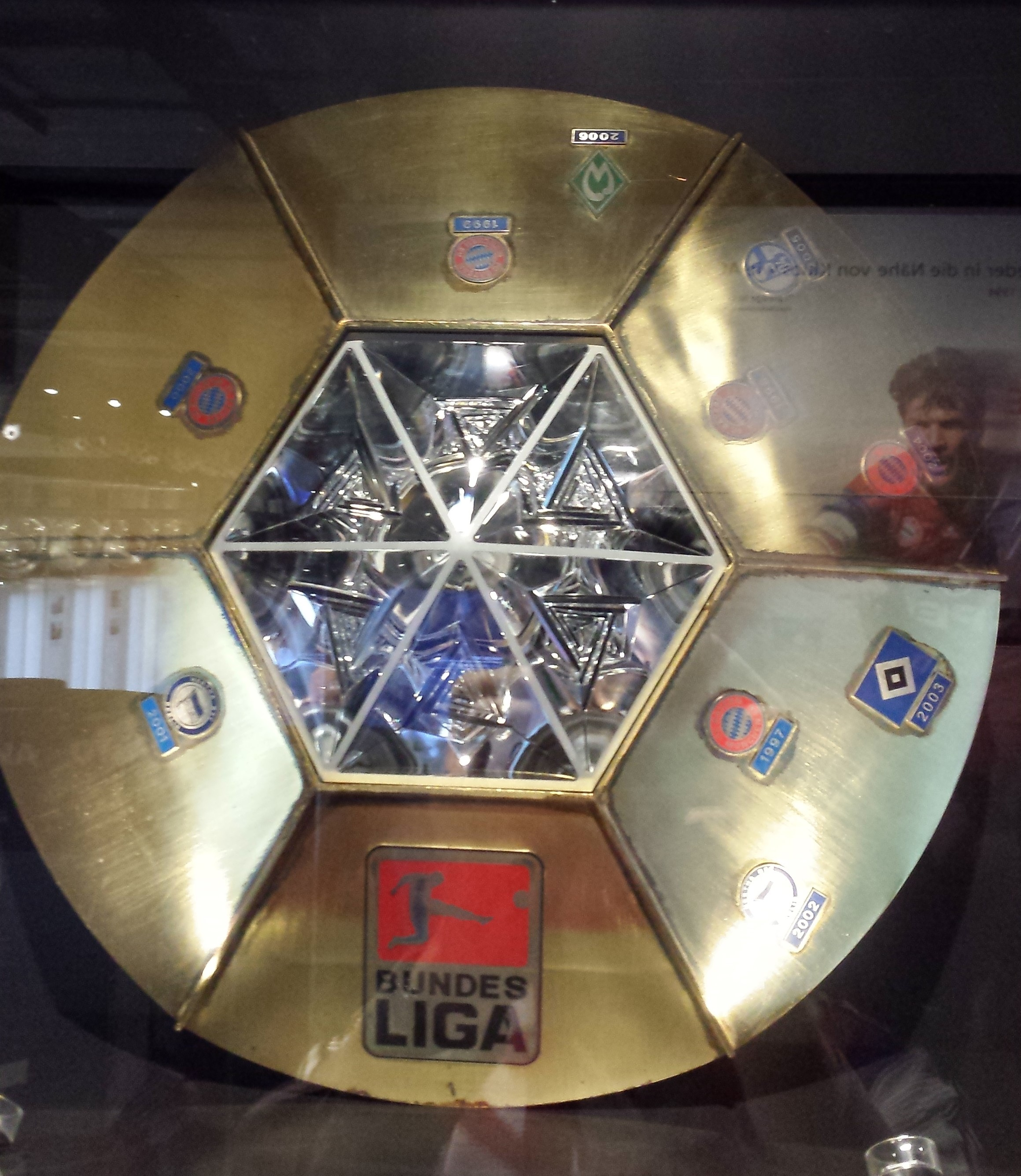
Trophy of the German League Cup, shown in the FC Bayern Erlebniswelt Museum

The first Ligapokal was played as a unique event in 1972 because the Olympics in Munich had caused a postponement of the regular season kick-off. From 1987 to 1996 there was a single match between the German champions (Deutscher Meister) and German Cup winners (Pokalsieger), the German Supercup, akin to the English FA Community Shield. An unofficial competition featuring four other big clubs who had not qualified for the Supercup, the Fuji-Cup (played in 1986 as the Casio-Cup), also existed from 1986 to 1996.

In 1997 this was extended to a cup competition consisting of six teams, the top five placed teams from the Bundesliga plus the German Cup winners, with the cup winners and champions entering in the semi-finals. If the cup winner was the same as any of the top five finishers in the league, the 6th place team was entitled to participate and the format was adjusted accordingly.

In the 2007 edition, the participating teams were the top four teams from the Bundesliga, the German Cup winners, as well as the winners of the 2. Bundesliga.

On three occasions (2003, 2005 and 2007), neither the league title holders nor the cup winners featured in the final. The lowest-ranked winners were Hertha BSC in 2001 who qualified via 5th place in the 2000–01 Bundesliga; the same team won a year later as 4th-place qualifiers, as did Hamburger SV in 2003 and Bayern Munich (the last of their six victories) in 2007.

== Finals ==
Year	Winners	Result	Runners-up	Venue
DFB-Ligapokal
1972–73	Hamburger SV	4–0	Borussia Mönchengladbach	Volksparkstadion, Hamburg
1997	Bayern Munich	2–0	VfB Stuttgart	Ulrich-Haberland-Stadion, Leverkusen
1998	Bayern Munich	4–0	VfB Stuttgart	BayArena, Leverkusen
1999	Bayern Munich	2–1	Werder Bremen	BayArena, Leverkusen
2000	Bayern Munich	5–1	Hertha BSC	BayArena, Leverkusen
2001	Hertha BSC	4–1	Schalke 04	Carl-Benz-Stadion, Mannheim
2002	Hertha BSC	4–1	Schalke 04	Ruhrstadion, Bochum
2003	Hamburger SV	4–2	Borussia Dortmund	Bruchwegstadion, Mainz
2004	Bayern Munich	3–2	Werder Bremen	Bruchwegstadion, Mainz
DFL-Ligapokal
2005	Schalke 04	1–0	VfB Stuttgart	Zentralstadion, Leipzig
2006	Werder Bremen	2–0	Bayern Munich	Zentralstadion, Leipzig
2007	Bayern Munich	1–0	Schalke 04	Zentralstadion, Leipzig

== Winners by team ==
Team	Winners	Runners-up	Years won	Years lost
Bayern Munich	6	1	1997, 1998, 1999, 2000, 2004, 2007	2006
Hertha BSC	2	1	2001, 2002	2000
Hamburger SV	2	0	1972–73, 2003	–
Schalke 04	1	3	2005	2001, 2002, 2007
Werder Bremen	1	2	2006	1999, 2004
VfB Stuttgart	0	3	–	1997, 1998, 2005
Borussia Mönchengladbach	0	1	–	1972–73
Borussia Dortmund	0	1	–	2003

== Media coverage ==
- All five matches of the 2007 Ligapokal were broadcast live on German free-TV channel Sat.1.
- In Australia, it was broadcast by Setanta Sports.
- In the United States, it was broadcast on GolTV.

== See also ==
- DFB-Pokal
- DFL-Supercup
- Fuji-Cup
- Bundesliga
- LIGA total! Cup
