= 1964–65 SV Werder Bremen season =

Werder Bremen
1964–65 season
- Manager: Willi Multhaup
- Stadium: Weser-Stadion
- Bundesliga: Winners
- DFB-Pokal: Round 1
- Top goalscorer: Klaus Matischak (12 goals)
- Highest home attendance: 40,000
- Lowest home attendance: 14,000
- Average home league attendance: 27,267
- Biggest win: Bremen 5–1 Braunschweig; Bremen 5–1 Hertha; Hamburg 0–4 Bremen
- Biggest defeat: Köln 4–2 Bremen; 1860 Munich 3–1 Bremen
- All statistics correct as of 15 May 1965.

The 1964–65 SV Werder Bremen season is the 55th season in the football club's history and 2nd consecutive and overall season in the top flight of German football, the Bundesliga, having earned qualification for the inaugural season from the Oberliga in 1963, after finishing second in the Oberliga Nord. Werder Bremen also participated in the season's edition of the domestic cup, the DFB-Pokal. The season covers a period from 1 July 1964 to 30 June 1965.

== Players ==
=== Squad ===
As of 1 July 1964

Note: Flags indicate national team as defined under FIFA eligibility rules; some limited exceptions apply. Players may hold more than one non-FIFA nationality.

No.	Pos.	Nation	Player
—	GK	FRG	Günter Bernard
—	GK	FRG	Klaus Lambertz
—	DF	FRG	Wolfgang Bordel
—	DF	FRG	Horst-Dieter Höttges
—	DF	FRG	Helmut Jagielski
—	DF	FRG	Walter Nachtwey
—	DF	FRG	Sepp Piontek
—	DF	FRG	Heinz Steinmann
—	MF	FRG	Diethelm Ferner
—	MF	FRG	Max Lorenz
—	MF	FRG	Helmut Schimeczek

No.	Pos.	Nation	Player
—	MF	FRG	Hans Schulz
—	MF	FRG	Arnold Schütz
—	MF	FRG	Willi Soya
—	FW	FRG	Horst Dudjahn
—	FW	FRG	Klaus Hänel
—	FW	FRG	Erwin Jung
—	FW	FRG	Theo Klöckner
—	FW	FRG	Klaus Matischak
—	FW	FRG	Dieter Thun
—	FW	FRG	Gerhard Zebrowski

=== Transfers ===
==== In ====
Pos	Player	Age	Moving from	Type	Window	Ref.
DF	(West Germany) Horst-Dieter Höttges	20	Borussia Mönchengladbach	Transfer	Summer	
FW	(West Germany) Klaus Matischak	25	Schalke 04	Transfer	Summer	
DF	(West Germany) Heinz Steinmann	26	1. FC Saarbrücken	Transfer	Summer	

==== Out ====
Pos	Player	Age	Moving to	Type	Window	Ref.
FW	(West Germany) Dieter Meyer	24	FC Bergedorf 85	Transfer	Summer	

== Competitions ==
Win Draw Loss

=== Overview ===
Competition	First match	Last match	Starting round	Final position	Record							
Competition	First match	Last match	Starting round	Final position	Pld	W	D	L	GF	GA	GD	Win %
Bundesliga	22 August 1964	15 May 1965	Matchday 1	Winners	30	15	11	4	54	29	+25	50.00
DFB-Pokal	16 January 1965	16 January 1965	Round 1	Round 1	1	0	0	1	0	1	−1	0.00
Total					31	15	11	5	54	30	+24	48.39

Last updated: 15 May 1965
Source: Worldfootball

=== Bundesliga ===
==== League table ====
Pos	Team	Pld	W	D	L	GF	GA	GR	Pts	Qualification
1	Werder Bremen	30	15	11	4	54	29	1.862	41	Qualification to European Cup preliminary round
2	1. FC Köln	30	14	10	6	66	45	1.467	38	Qualification to Inter-Cities Fairs Cup first round
3	Borussia Dortmund	30	15	6	9	67	48	1.396	36	Qualification to European Cup Winners' Cup first round
4	1860 Munich	30	14	7	9	70	50	1.400	35	Qualification to Inter-Cities Fairs Cup second round
5	Hannover 96	30	13	7	10	48	42	1.143	33	Qualification to Inter-Cities Fairs Cup first round

Source: DFB
Rules for classification: 1) Points; 2) Goal average.

==== Results summary ====
Overall								Home						Away					
Pld	W	D	L	GF	GA	GD	Pts	W	D	L	GF	GA	GD	W	D	L	GF	GA	GD
30	15	11	4	54	29	+25	41	9	6	0	30	10	+20	6	5	4	24	19	+5

Last updated: 15 May 1965.
Source: Bundesliga

==== Results by round ====
Round	1	2	3	4	5	6	7	8	9	10	11	12	13	14	15	16	17	18	19	20	21	22	23	24	25	26	27	28	29	30
Ground	A	H	A	H	A	H	A	H	A	H	H	A	H	A	H	H	A	H	A	H	A	H	A	H	A	A	H	A	H	A
Result	L	W	W	W	L	D	W	W	D	W	D	L	W	W	D	D	D	D	W	D	W	W	D	W	D	L	W	D	W	W
Position	13	6	1	1	4	5	3	2	2	1	1	2	2	1	1	2	1	1	1	1	1	1	1	1	1	1	1	1	1	1

Updated to match(es) played on 15 May 1965. Source: Bundesliga
A = Away; H = Home; W = Win; D = Draw; L = Loss

==== Matches ====
22 August 1964 1	1. FC Kaiserslautern	2–1	Werder Bremen	Kaiserslautern
16:00 CET (UTC+1)	Richter 14'; Leydecker 38'	Report	Matischak 17'	Stadium: Betzenbergstadion; Attendance: 25,000; Referee: Franz Heumann

29 August 1964 2	Werder Bremen	5–1	Eintracht Braunschweig	Bremen
16:00 CET (UTC+1)	Hänel 10'; Piontek 23'; Schütz 25'; Zebrowski 58'; Matischak 74'	Report	Moll 30'	Stadium: Weser-Stadion; Attendance: 15,000; Referee: Hans-Joachim Weyland

5 September 1964 3	Eintracht Frankfurt	0–2	Werder Bremen	Frankfurt
16:00 CET (UTC+1)		Report	Zebrowski 32', 55'	Stadium: Waldstadion; Attendance: 23,000; Referee: Alfred Ott

12 September 1964 4	Werder Bremen	1–0	Karlsruher SC	Bremen
16:00 CET (UTC+1)	Schütz 62' (pen.)	Report		Stadium: Weser-Stadion; Attendance: 27,000; Referee: Josef Hoffmann

19 September 1964 5	1. FC Köln	4–2	Werder Bremen	Cologne
16:00 CET (UTC+1)	Müller 20'; Schäfer 38', 87'; Hornig 79'	Report	Schütz 60'; Zebrowski 83'	Stadium: Müngersdorfer Stadion; Attendance: 35,000; Referee: Horst Mathieu

26 September 1964 6	Werder Bremen	0–0	Hamburger SV	Bremen
16:00 CET (UTC+1)		Report		Stadium: Weser-Stadion; Attendance: 40,000; Referee: Walter Zimmermann

10 October 1964 7	Hannover 96	1–2	Werder Bremen	Hanover
15:15 CET (UTC+1)	Gräber 39'	Report	Matischak 43', 82'	Stadium: Niedersachsenstadion; Attendance: 50,000; Referee: Rudibert Jacobi

17 October 1964 8	Werder Bremen	2–0	Borussia Neunkirchen	Bremen
15:15 CET (UTC+1)	Klöckner 28'; Zebrowski 38'	Report		Stadium: Weser-Stadion; Attendance: 14,000; Referee: Werner Treichel

24 October 1964 9	VfB Stuttgart	1–1	Werder Bremen	Stuttgart
15:15 CET (UTC+1)	Geiger 86'	Report	Schütz 11'	Stadium: Neckarstadion; Attendance: 18,000; Referee: Günther Baumgärtel

7 November 1964 10	Werder Bremen	5–1	Hertha BSC	Bremen
14:30 CET (UTC+1)	Schulz 68'; Schütz 69', 80'; Zebrowski 83'; Soya 86'	Report	Krampitz 60'	Stadium: Weser-Stadion; Attendance: 18,000; Referee: Gerd Hennig

14 November 1964 11	Werder Bremen	2–2	Schalke 04	Bremen
14:30 CET (UTC+1)	Soya 17'; Schütz 50'	Report	Herrmann 42' (pen.); Kreuz 46'	Stadium: Weser-Stadion; Attendance: 19,000; Referee: Edgar Deuschel

21 November 1964 12	1860 Munich	3–1	Werder Bremen	Munich
14:30 CET (UTC+1)	Kohlars 13', 70'; Heiß 85'	Report	Klöckner 2'	Stadium: Städtisches Stadion an der Grünwalder Straße; Attendance: 35,000; Referee: Helmut Fritz

28 November 1964 13	Werder Bremen	1–0	Meidericher SV	Bremen
18:30 CET (UTC+1)	Zebrowski 88'	Report		Stadium: Weser-Stadion; Attendance: 18,000; Referee: Fritz Seiler

5 December 1964 14	Borussia Dortmund	1–2	Werder Bremen	Dortmund
14:15 CET (UTC+1)	Konietzka 28'	Report	Höttges 37' (pen.); Klöckner 60'	Stadium: Stadion Rote Erde; Attendance: 18,000; Referee: Heinz Siebert

12 December 1964 15	Werder Bremen	1–1	1. FC Nürnberg	Bremen
18:30 CET (UTC+1)	Schulz 32'	Report	Strehl 84'	Stadium: Weser-Stadion; Attendance: 35,000; Referee: Karl Niemeyer

19 December 1964 16	Werder Bremen	1–1	1. FC Kaiserslautern	Bremen
18:30 CET (UTC+1)	Ferner 60'	Report	Kapitulski 10'	Stadium: Weser-Stadion; Attendance: 18,000; Referee: Willi Thier

2 January 1965 17	Eintracht Braunschweig	1–1	Werder Bremen	Braunschweig
15:00 CET (UTC+1)	Krafczyk 37'	Report	Zebrowski 90'	Stadium: Eintracht-Stadion; Attendance: 30,000; Referee: Günther Baumgärtel

9 January 1965 18	Werder Bremen	2–2	Eintracht Frankfurt	Bremen
15:00 CET (UTC+1)	Lorenz 40'; Schütz 48'	Report	Stein 46'; Stinka 86'	Stadium: Weser-Stadion; Attendance: 25,000; Referee: Edgar Deuschel

23 January 1965 19	Karlsruher SC	0–2	Werder Bremen	Karlsruhe
15:30 CET (UTC+1)		Report	Schulz 30'; Kahn 84' (o.g.)	Stadium: Wildparkstadion; Attendance: 25,000; Referee: Otto Tremel

30 January 1965 20	Werder Bremen	0–0	1. FC Köln	Bremen
15:00 CET (UTC+1)		Report		Stadium: Weser-Stadion; Attendance: 40,000; Referee: Kurt Handwerker

13 February 1965 21	Hamburger SV	0–4	Werder Bremen	Hamburg
15:00 CET (UTC+1)		Report	Matischak 16', 26'; D. Seeler 78' (o.g.); Schütz 80'	Stadium: Volksparkstadion; Attendance: 30,000; Referee: Hans-Joachim Weyland

20 February 1965 22	Werder Bremen	3–0	Hannover 96	Bremen
15:00 CET (UTC+1)	Piontek 23'; Matischak 65', 71'	Report		Stadium: Weser-Stadion; Attendance: 35,000; Referee: Günther Baumgärtel

6 March 1965 23	Borussia Neunkirchen	1–1	Werder Bremen	Neunkirchen
16:00 CET (UTC+1)	Schock 55'	Report	Matischak 77'	Stadium: Ellenfeldstadion; Attendance: 28,000; Referee: Franz Heumann

20 March 1965 24	Werder Bremen	1–0	VfB Stuttgart	Bremen
16:00 CET (UTC+1)	Lorenz 52'	Report		Stadium: Weser-Stadion; Attendance: 25,000; Referee: Willi Thier

27 March 1965 25	Hertha BSC	0–0	Werder Bremen	Berlin
16:00 CET (UTC+1)		Report		Stadium: Olympiastadion Berlin; Attendance: 54,000; Referee: Rudibert Jacobi

3 April 1965 26	Schalke 04	1–0	Werder Bremen	Gelsenkirchen
16:00 CET (UTC+1)	Crawatzo 11'	Report		Stadium: Glückauf-Kampfbahn; Attendance: 35,000; Referee: Horst Mathieu

10 April 1965 27	Werder Bremen	3–2	1860 Munich	Bremen
16:00 CET (UTC+1)	Zebrowski 42'; Schulz 62'; Bena 76' (o.g.)	Report	Heiß 7'; Kraus 43'	Stadium: Weser-Stadion; Attendance: 40,000; Referee: Alfred Ott

30 April 1965 28	Meidericher SV	2–2	Werder Bremen	Duisburg
20:00 CET (UTC+1)	Schmidt 62'; Van Haaren 79'	Report	Matischak 24'; Schütz 51'	Stadium: Wedaustadion; Attendance: 35,000; Referee: Günther Sparing

8 May 1965 29	Werder Bremen	3–0	Borussia Dortmund	Bremen
16:00 CET (UTC+1)	Matischak 13'; Klöckner 45'; Zebrowski 87'	Report		Stadium: Weser-Stadion; Attendance: 40,000; Referee: Kurt Tschenscher

15 May 1965 30	1. FC Nürnberg	2–3	Werder Bremen	Nuremberg
16:00 CET (UTC+1)	Strehl 8', 43'	Report	Zebrowski 10'; Matischak 39'; Piontek 54'	Stadium: Städtisches Stadion; Attendance: 22,000; Referee: Helmut Fritz

=== DFB-Pokal ===
16 January 1965 Round 1	Mainz 05	1–0	Werder Bremen	Mainz
	Meyer 56'	Report		Stadium: Bruchwegstadion; Attendance: 12,000; Referee: Fritz Seiler

== Squad statistics ==
=== Appearances and goals ===
As of 15 May 1965

Player	Bundesliga		DFB-Pokal		Total	
Player	Apps	Goals	Apps	Goals	Apps	Goals
Goalkeepers
(West Germany) Günter Bernard	30	0	0	0	30	0
(West Germany) Klaus Lambertz	0	0	1	0	1	0
Defenders
(West Germany) Wolfgang Bordel	1	0	1	0	2	0
(West Germany) Horst-Dieter Höttges	29	1	0	0	29	1
(West Germany) Helmut Jagielski	26	0	1	0	27	0
(West Germany) Walter Nachtwey	0	0	0	0	0	0
(West Germany) Sepp Piontek	28	3	1	0	29	3
(West Germany) Heinz Steinmann	26	0	1	0	27	0
Midfielders
(West Germany) Diethelm Ferner	29	1	1	0	30	1
(West Germany) Max Lorenz	27	2	1	0	28	2
(West Germany) Helmut Schimeczek	6	0	1	0	7	0
(West Germany) Hans Schulz	19	4	0	0	19	4
(West Germany) Arnold Schütz	28	10	1	0	29	10
(West Germany) Willi Soya	8	2	1	0	9	2
Forwards
(West Germany) Horst Dudjahn	0	0	0	0	0	0
(West Germany) Klaus Hänel	7	1	0	0	7	1
(West Germany) Erwin Jung	0	0	0	0	0	0
(West Germany) Theo Klöckner	17	4	0	0	17	4
(West Germany) Klaus Matischak	19	12	0	0	19	12
(West Germany) Dieter Thun	2	0	0	0	2	0
(West Germany) Gerhard Zebrowski	28	11	1	0	29	11

=== Goalscorers ===
As of 15 May 1965

Rank	Position	Player	Bundesliga	DFB-Pokal	Total
1	FW	(West Germany) Klaus Matischak	12	0	12
2	FW	(West Germany) Gerhard Zebrowski	11	0	11
3	MF	(West Germany) Arnold Schütz	10	0	10
4	FW	(West Germany) Theo Klöckner	4	0	4
4	MF	(West Germany) Hans Schulz	4	0	4
6	DF	(West Germany) Sepp Piontek	3	0	3
7	MF	(West Germany) Max Lorenz	2	0	2
7	MF	(West Germany) Willi Soya	2	0	2
9	MF	(West Germany) Diethelm Ferner	1	0	1
9	FW	(West Germany) Klaus Hänel	1	0	1
9	DF	(West Germany) Horst-Dieter Höttges	1	0	1
Own goal			3	0	3
Total			54	0	54

=== Clean sheets ===
As of 8 May 1965

Rank	Player	Bundesliga	DFB-Pokal	Total
1	(Germany) Günter Bernard	12	0	12
Total		12	0	12
