= 1961 DFB-Pokal final =

- Match programme cover
- Event: 1960–61 DFB-Pokal
Werder Bremen	1. FC Kaiserslautern
2	0
- Date: 13 September 1961
- Venue: Glückauf-Kampfbahn, Gelsenkirchen
- Referee: Günter Sparing (Kassel)
- Attendance: 18,000

The 1961 DFB-Pokal final decided the winner of the 1960–61 DFB-Pokal, the 18th season of Germany's knockout football cup competition. It was played on 13 September 1961 at the Glückauf-Kampfbahn in Gelsenkirchen. Werder Bremen won the match 2–0 against 1. FC Kaiserslautern, to claim their 1st cup title.

== Route to the final ==
The DFB-Pokal began with 16 teams in a single-elimination knockout cup competition. There were a total of three rounds leading up to the final. Teams were drawn against each other, and the winner after 90 minutes would advance. If still tied, 30 minutes of extra time was played. If the score was still level, a replay would take place at the original away team's stadium. If still level after 90 minutes, 30 minutes of extra time was played. If the score was still level, a drawing of lots would decide who would advance to the next round.

Note: In all results below, the score of the finalist is given first (H: home; A: away).

Werder Bremen		Round	1. FC Kaiserslautern
Opponent	Result	1960–61 DFB-Pokal	Opponent	Result
1. FC Saarbrücken (A)	1–0	Round of 16	Heider SV (H)	2–0
1. FC Köln (H)	3–2	Quarter-finals	Tasmania 1900 Berlin (H)	2–1 (a.e.t.)
Karlsruher SC (H)	3–2 (a.e.t.)	Semi-finals	Hamborn 07 (A)	2–1

== Match ==
=== Details ===
13 September 1961
19:30 CET

Werder Bremen	2–0	1. FC Kaiserslautern
Schröder 10'; Jagielski 52'	Report

Glückauf-Kampfbahn, Gelsenkirchen
Attendance: 18,000
Referee: Günter Sparing (Kassel)

Werder Bremen	1. FC Kaiserslautern

GK	1	(West Germany) Heinrich Kokartis
RB		(West Germany) Sepp Piontek
LB		(West Germany) Walter Nachtwey
RH		(West Germany) Helmut Schimeczek
CH		(West Germany) Arnold Schütz
LH		(West Germany) Helmut Jagielski
OR		(West Germany) Günter Wilmovius
IR		(West Germany) Willi Schröder (c)
CF		(West Germany) Horst Barth
IL		(West Germany) Willi Soya
OL		(West Germany) Klaus Hänel
Manager:
(West Germany) Georg Knöpfle

GK	1	(West Germany) Wolfgang Schnarr
RB		(West Germany) Jürgen Neumann
LB		(West Germany) Gerhard Miksa
RH		(West Germany) Gerd Schneider
CH		(West Germany) Werner Liebrich
LH		(West Germany) Dieter Pulter
OR		(West Germany) Manfred Feldmüller
IR		(West Germany) Heinrich Bauer
CF		(West Germany) Winfried Richter
IL		(West Germany) Gerhard Settelmeyer
OL		(West Germany) Günther Kasperski
Manager:
(West Germany) Günter Brocker

Match rules

- 90 minutes.
- 30 minutes of extra time if necessary.
- Replay if scores still level.
- No substitutions.
