= List of SV Werder Bremen players =

SV Werder Bremen is a German football club based in Bremen. This list contains all the footballers that have made over 100 league appearances for the club since the formation of the Bundesliga in 1963.

Players are listed according to the date of their first team debut. Appearances and goals are for Bundesliga and 2. Bundesliga (1980–81 and 2021–22) matches only.

== Players ==
As of end of May 2026

Name	Nationality	Position	Club career	Apps	Goals
Diethelm Ferner	Germany	MF	1963–1969	188	20
Max Lorenz	Germany	DF	1963–1969	176	15
Gerhard Zebrowski	Germany	FW	1963–1969	145	40
Josef Piontek	Germany	DF	1963–1972	203	15
Arnold Schütz	Germany	MF	1963–1972	253	69
Günter Bernard	Germany	GK	1963–1974	287	0
Heinz Steinmann	Germany	DF	1964–1971	184	4
Horst-Dieter Höttges	Germany	DF	1964–1978	420	55
John Danielsen	Denmark	MF	1965–1970	131	17
Ole Bjørnmose	Denmark	FW	1966–1971	137	21
Werner Görts	Germany	FW	1966–1978	363	73
Bernd Schmidt	Germany	DF	1967–1974	150	11
Dieter Zembski	Germany	DF	1968–1975	179	4
Heinz-Dieter Hasebrink	Germany	MF	1969–1973	114	16
Rudi Assauer	Germany	DF	1970–1976	188	4
Karl-Heinz Kamp	Germany	MF	1970–1984	400	30
Werner Weist	Germany	FW	1971–1977	145	53
Uwe Bracht	Germany	MF	1971–1984	309	26
Per Røntved	Denmark	DF	1972–1979	194	40
Dieter Burdenski	Germany	GK	1972–1988	479	1
Karlheinz Geils	Germany	DF	1974–1980	132	2
Franz Hiller	Germany	MF	1974–1980	162	4
Jürgen Röber	Germany	MF	1974–1980	184	57
Hartmut Konschal	Germany	FW	1976–1981	158	16
Norbert Siegmann	Germany	DF	1976–1985	193	14
Uwe Reinders	Germany	FW	1977–1985	243	83
Benno Möhlmann	Germany	MF	1978–1987	267	46
Thomas Schaaf	Germany	DF	1978–1995	281	14
Jonny Otten	Germany	DF	1979–1992	349	3
Klaus Fichtel	Germany	DF	1980–1984	117	0
Norbert Meier	Germany	FW	1980–1989	281	82
Yasuhiko Okudera	Japan	DF	1981–1986	159	11
Wolfgang Sidka	Germany	MF	1982–1987	115	17
Rudi Völler	Germany	FW	1982–1987	137	97
Günter Hermann	Germany	MF	1982–1992	231	8
Frank Neubarth	Germany	FW	1982–1996	317	97
Bruno Pezzey	Austria	DF	1983–1987	114	18
Frank Ordenewitz	Germany	FW	1983–1989	125	37
Michael Kutzop	Germany	DF	1984–1990	121	23
Gunnar Sauer	Germany	DF	1984–1996	134	8
Thomas Wolter	Germany	MF	1984–1999	312	12
Manfred Burgsmüller	Germany	FW	1985–1990	115	34
Miroslav Votava	Germany	MF	1985–1996	357	18
Oliver Reck	Germany	GK	1985–1998	345	0
Dieter Eilts	Germany	MF	1985–2002	390	7
Rune Bratseth	Norway	DF	1987–1995	230	12
Uli Borowka	Germany	DF	1987–1995	239	8
Wynton Rufer	New Zealand	FW	1989–1994	174	59
Andree Wiedener	Germany	DF	1989–2001	164	3
Marco Bode	Germany	MF	1989–2002	379	101
Andreas Herzog	Austria	MF	1992–1995, 1996–2001	236	58
Frank Rost	Germany	GK	1992–2002	147	1
Bernd Hobsch	Germany	FW	1993–1997	106	33
Victor Skripnik	Ukraine	DF	1996–2004	138	7
Torsten Frings	Germany	MF	1997–2002, 2005–2011	326	36
Aílton	Brazil	FW	1998–2004	169	88
Paul Stalteri	Canada	MF	1998–2005	151	6
Frank Baumann	Germany	DF	1999–2009	260	15
Claudio Pizarro	Peru	FW	1999–2001, 2008–2012, 2015–2017, 2018–2020	250	109
Mladen Krstajić	Serbia	DF	2000–2004	112	11
Fabian Ernst	Germany	MF	2000–2005	152	11
Tim Borowski	Germany	MF	2000–2008, 2009–2012	210	27
Ivan Klasnić	Croatia	FW	2001–2008	151	49
Johan Micoud	France	MF	2002–2006	123	31
Christian Schulz	Germany	DF	2002–2007	103	4
Daniel Jensen	Denmark	MF	2004–2011	133	7
Petri Pasanen	Finland	DF	2004–2011	144	3
Aaron Hunt	Germany	FW	2004–2014	215	46
Naldo	Brazil	DF	2005–2012	173	22
Tim Wiese	Germany	GK	2005–2012	194	0
Hugo Almeida	Portugal	FW	2006–2010	117	41
Per Mertesacker	Germany	DF	2006–2011	147	12
Clemens Fritz	Germany	DF	2006–2017	288	5
Markus Rosenberg	Sweden	FW	2007–2010, 2011–2012	123	40
Sebastian Prödl	Austria	DF	2008–2015	149	10
Philipp Bargfrede	Germany	MF	2008–2021	206	6
Niclas Füllkrug	Germany	FW	2011–2013, 2019–2023	113	47
Zlatko Junuzović	Austria	MF	2012–2018	188	21
Theodor Gebre Selassie	Czech Republic	DF	2012–2021	271	23
Fin Bartels	Germany	MF	2014–2020	120	22
Maximilian Eggestein	Germany	MF	2014–2021	159	12
Niklas Moisander	Finland	DF	2016–2021	125	2
Miloš Veljković	Serbia	DF	2016–2025	221	6
Jiří Pavlenka	Czech Republic	GK	2017–2024	198	0
Marco Friedl	Austria	DF	2018–	213	7
Christian Groß	Germany	DF	2019–2024	110	1
Leonardo Bittencourt	Germany	MF	2019–2026	175	16
Romano Schmid	Austria	MF	2020–	181	17
Felix Agu	Nigeria	DF	2020–	101	4
Anthony Jung	Germany	DF	2021–2025	123	5
Marvin Ducksch	Germany	FW	2021–2025	128	52
Mitchell Weiser	Germany	DF	2021–	116	12
Jens Stage	Denmark	MF	2022–	119	26
