= 1965–66 European Cup =

European football tournament

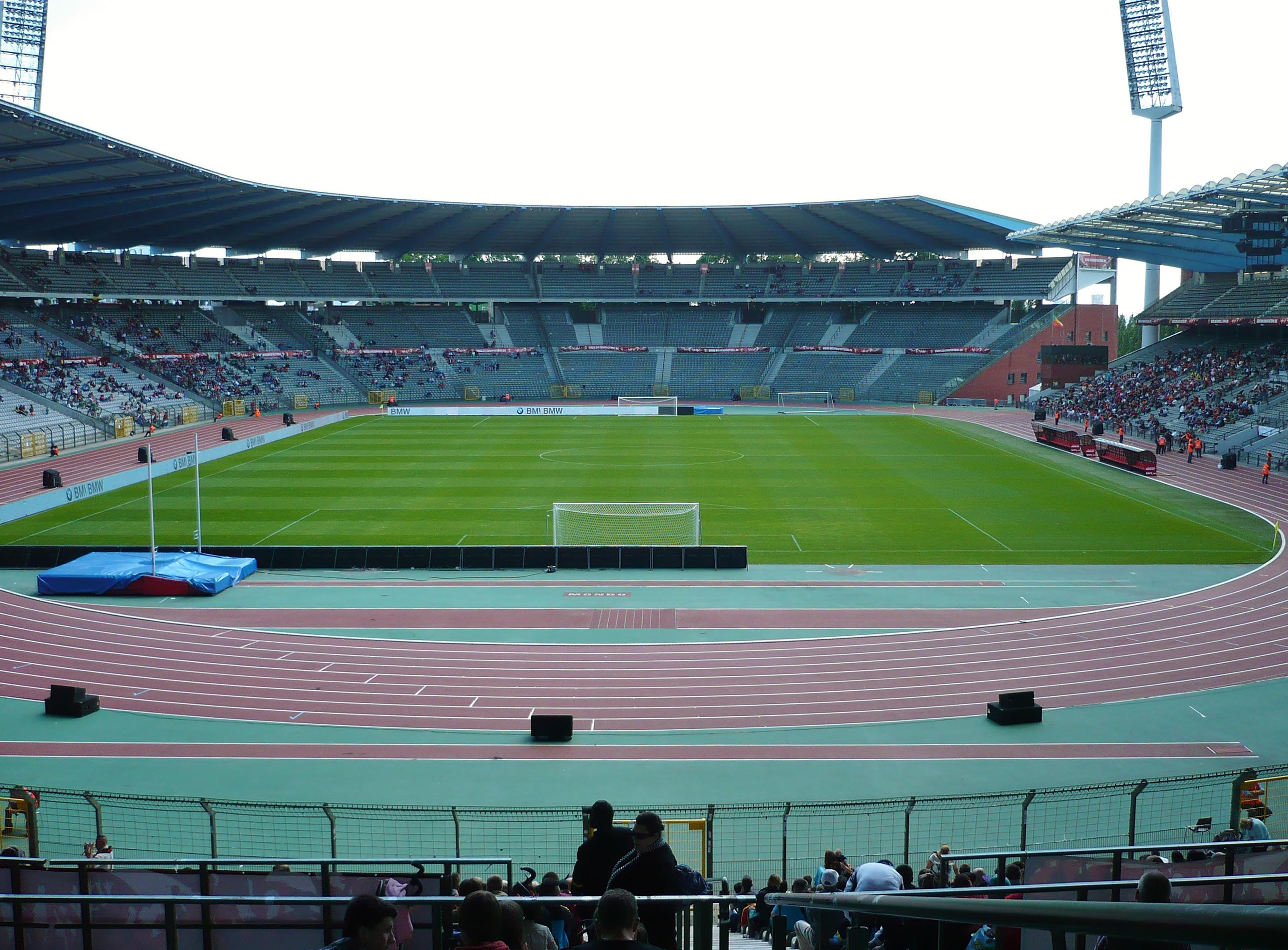
- The Heysel Stadium in Brussels hosted the final.

Tournament details
- Dates: 8 September 1965 – 11 May 1966
- Teams: 31 (from 31 associations)

Final positions
- Champions: (Spain) Real Madrid (6th title)
- Runners-up: (Socialist Federal Republic of Yugoslavia) Partizan

Tournament statistics
- Matches played: 58
- Goals scored: 224 (3.86 per match)
- Attendance: 1,609,799 (27,755 per match)
- Top scorer(s): Flórián Albert (Ferencváros); Eusébio (Benfica); 7 goals each

The 1965–66 European Cup was the 11th season of the European Cup, UEFA's premier club football tournament. The competition was won by Real Madrid, winners of the first five European Cups from 1956 to 1960, who beat Partizan 2–1 in a close final at Heysel Stadium in Brussels on 11 May 1966.

Inter Milan were the defending champions, but were eliminated by eventual winners Real Madrid in the semi-finals.

No new association entered its representative, which happened only for the second time after 1959–60 edition. However, Cyprus returned to the competition after their inaugural 1963–64 season.

In the preliminary round, Benfica recorded highest aggregate win in the history of the European Cup by beating Stade Dudelange 18–0 (8–0 away, 10–0 at home).

== Teams ==
A total of 31 teams participated in the competition.

For the first time since inaugural edition all associations were represented by only one team.

17 Nëntori, LASK, Levski Sofia, APOEL, Sparta Prague, HJK, Nantes, Keflavík, Derry City, Kilmarnock, Lausanne-Sports, and Werder Bremen made their debut in the competition.

Djurgårdens IF made their first appearance since the inaugural 1955–56 tournament, while Manchester United and Stade Dudelange returned to the competition after seven years.

All participants were their respective associations champions, except for Lyn. They were leading 1. divisjon at the summer break on 1 July 1965, after 9 of 18 matches had been played, but finished second in autumn of 1965.

(Albania) 17 Nëntori (1st)	(Austria) LASK (1st)	(Belgium) Anderlecht (1st)	(Bulgaria) Levski Sofia (1st)
(Cyprus) APOEL (1st)	(Czechoslovakia) Sparta Prague (1st)	(Denmark) Boldklubben 1909 (1st)	(East Germany) Vorwärts Berlin (1st)
(England) Manchester United (1st)	(Finland) HJK (1st)	(France) Nantes (1st)	(Greece) Panathinaikos (1st)
(Hungary) Ferencváros (1st)	(Iceland) Keflavík (1st)	(Italy) Inter Milan (1st)^{TH}	(Luxembourg) Stade Dudelange (1st)
(Malta) Sliema Wanderers (1st)	(Netherlands) Feyenoord (1st)	(Northern Ireland) Derry City (1st)	(Norway) Lyn (2nd)
(Poland) Górnik Zabrze (1st)	(Portugal) Benfica (1st)	(Republic of Ireland) Drumcondra (1st)	(Romania) Dinamo București (1st)
(Scotland) Kilmarnock (1st)	(Spain) Real Madrid (1st)	(Sweden) Djurgårdens IF (1st)	(Switzerland) Lausanne-Sports (1st)
(Turkey) Fenerbahçe (1st)	(West Germany) Werder Bremen (1st)	(Socialist Federal Republic of Yugoslavia) Partizan (1st)	

== Preliminary round ==
Location of teams in the 1965–66 European Cup

Similar to previous editions, only title holders Inter Milan received a bye to the first round. The remaining clubs would play the preliminary round in September and October, apart from two matches that took place in late August.

For the second time in row teams in the preliminary round were not divided geographically into pots, which resulted in some teams covering over 6,200 kilometres for their ties (e.g. Keflavík and Ferencváros), while other had shorter trips (e.g. LASK and Górnik Zabrze – around 800 kilometres).

Team 1	Agg.	Team 2	1st leg	2nd leg
Feyenoord (Netherlands)	2–6	(Spain) Real Madrid	2–1	0–5
17 Nëntori (Albania)	0–1	(Scotland) Kilmarnock	0–0	0–1
Fenerbahçe (Turkey)	1–5	(Belgium) Anderlecht	0–0	1–5
Lyn (Norway)	6–8	(Northern Ireland) Derry City	5–3	1–5
Panathinaikos (Greece)	4–2	(Malta) Sliema Wanderers	4–1	0–1
Keflavík (Iceland)	2–13	(Hungary) Ferencváros	1–4	1–9
Dinamo București (Romania)	7–2	(Denmark) Boldklubben 1909	4–0	3–2
HJK (Finland)	2–9	(England) Manchester United	2–3	0–6
Drumcondra (Republic of Ireland)	1–3	(East Germany) Vorwärts Berlin	1–0	0–3
Stade Dudelange (Luxembourg)	0–18	(Portugal) Benfica	0–8	0–10
Djurgårdens IF (Sweden)	2–7	(Bulgaria) Levski Sofia	2–1	0–6
Lausanne-Sports (Switzerland)	0–4	(Czechoslovakia) Sparta Prague	0–0	0–4
LASK (Austria)	2–5	(Poland) Górnik Zabrze	1–3	1–2
APOEL (Cyprus)	0–10	(West Germany) Werder Bremen	0–5	0–5
Partizan (Socialist Federal Republic of Yugoslavia)	4–2	(France) Nantes	2–0	2–2

=== First leg ===
29 August 1965

Keflavík (Iceland)	1–4	(Hungary) Ferencváros
Júlíusson 67'	Report	Németh 26'; Karába 37'; Varga 38'; Albert 58'

Laugardalsvöllur, Reykjavík
Attendance: 5,422
Referee: Bobby Davidson (Scotland)

31 August 1965

Lyn (Norway)	5–3	(Northern Ireland) Derry City
J. Berg 4', 32'; Dybwad-Olsen 19', 50'; Stavrum 62'	Report	R. Wood 10'; Gilbert 24', 34'

Bislett Stadion, Oslo
Attendance: 15,237
Referee: Rudi Glöckner (East Germany)

8 September 1965

Feyenoord (Netherlands)	2–1	(Spain) Real Madrid
Venneker 77'; Kraay 85'	Report	Puskás 38'

De Kuip, Rotterdam
Attendance: 62,610
Referee: Karol Galba (Czechoslovakia)

8 September 1965

17 Nëntori (Albania)	0–0	(Scotland) Kilmarnock
	Report

Stadiumi Qemal Stafa, Tirana
Attendance: 26,495
Referee: Franz Mayer (Austria)

8 September 1965

Fenerbahçe (Turkey)	0–0	(Belgium) Anderlecht
	Report

Mithatpaşa Stadyumu, Istanbul
Attendance: 30,140
Referee: Nicolae Mihăilescu (Romania)

12 September 1965

Djurgårdens IF (Sweden)	2–1	(Bulgaria) Levski Sofia
Nilsson 40', 63'	Report	Sokolov 8'

Olympiastadion, Stockholm
Attendance: 3,311
Referee: Joseph Hannet (Belgium)

15 September 1965

Drumcondra (Republic of Ireland)	1–0	(East Germany) Vorwärts Berlin
Morrissey 64'	Report

Tolka Park, Dublin
Attendance: 8,600
Referee: Leo Horn (Netherlands)

15 September 1965

LASK (Austria)	1–3	(Poland) Górnik Zabrze
Köglberger 60'	Report	Musiałek 19'; Wilczek 22', 55'

Linzer Stadion, Linz
Attendance: 18,887
Referee: Jenő Gere (Hungary)

22 September 1965

Partizan (Socialist Federal Republic of Yugoslavia)	2–0	(France) Nantes
Galić 37'; Hasanagić 48'	Report

Stadion JNA, Belgrade
Attendance: 20,464
Referee: Francesco Francescon (Italy)

22 September 1965

HJK (Finland)	2–3	(England) Manchester United
Pahlman 31'; Peltoniemi 71'	Report	Herd 1'; Connelly 15'; Law 36'

Olympic Stadium, Helsinki
Attendance: 15,583
Referee: Ryszard Banasiuk (Poland)

22 September 1965

Lausanne-Sports (Switzerland)	0–0	(Czechoslovakia) Sparta Prague
	Report

Stade Olympique de la Pontaise, Lausanne
Attendance: 25,614
Referee: Vital Loraux (Belgium)

26 September 1965

Panathinaikos (Greece)	4–1	(Malta) Sliema Wanderers
Sakellaridis 5'; Loukanidis 18'; Domazos 32'; Kamaras 61'	Report	Cini 36'

Leoforos Alexandras Stadium, Athens
Attendance: 23,726
Referee: Atanas Kiryakov (Bulgaria)

28 September 1965

Dinamo București (Romania)	4–0	(Denmark) Boldklubben 1909
Ene 50'; Gergely 75'; Frățilă 85', 88'	Report

Stadionul Republicii, Bucharest
Attendance: 9,812
Referee: Stjepan Varaždinec (Yugoslavia)

30 September 1965

Stade Dudelange (Luxembourg)	0–8	(Portugal) Benfica
	Report	Pedras 15', 21', 78'; Pereira 29'; Brenner 46' (o.g.); Yaúca 59', 81'; Santana 85'

Stade de la Frontière, Esch-sur-Alzette
Attendance: 4,570
Referee: Werner Treichel (West Germany)

6 October 1965

APOEL (Cyprus)	0–5	(West Germany) Werder Bremen
	Report	Matischak 14', 33'; Podlich 32'; Schulz 44'; Zebrowski 78'

Volksparkstadion, Hamburg
Attendance: 8,208
Referee: Marcel Zeimes (Luxembourg)

=== Second leg ===
8 September 1965

Ferencváros (Hungary)	9–1	(Iceland) Keflavík
Albert 8', 44', 6', 81', 89'; Novák 12', 22'; Varga 23', 34'	Report	Jóhansson 37'

Népstadion, Budapest
Attendance: 18,088
Referee: Wacław Majdan (Poland)

Ferencváros won 13–2 on aggregate.

9 September 1965

Derry City (Northern Ireland)	5–1	(Norway) Lyn
Wilson 3', 17'; Crossan 49'; R. Wood 67'; McGeough 71'	Report	Stavrum 44'

Brandywell Stadium, Derry
Attendance: 6,968
Referee: Willem Schalks (Netherlands)

Derry City won 8–6 on aggregate.

15 September 1965

Anderlecht (Belgium)	5–1	(Turkey) Fenerbahçe
Van Himst 5'; Stockman 32', 50', 70'; Hanon 89'	Report	Altıparmak 83'

Stade Émile Versé, Brussels
Attendance: 34,287
Referee: Ernest Crawford (England)

Anderlecht won 5–1 on aggregate.

22 September 1965

Vorwärts Berlin (East Germany)	3–0	(Republic of Ireland) Drumcondra
Vogt 21'; Begerad 51'; Piepenburg 68'	Report

Friedrich-Ludwig-Jahn-Sportpark, Berlin
Attendance: 12,971
Referee: Kurt Lindberg (Sweden)

Vorwärts Berlin won 3–1 on aggregate.

22 September 1965

Real Madrid (Spain)	5–0	(Netherlands) Feyenoord
Puskás 12', 22', 35', 86'; Grosso 44'	Report

Santiago Bernabéu, Madrid
Attendance: 53,239
Referee: Jack Taylor (England)

Real Madrid won 6–2 on aggregate.

22 September 1965

Górnik Zabrze (Poland)	2–1	(Austria) LASK
Pohl 9'; Szołtysik 22'	Report	Lipošinović 34' (pen.)

Stadion Śląski, Chorzów
Attendance: 38,887
Referee: Karl Göppel (Switzerland)

Górnik Zabrze won 5–2 on aggregate.

29 September 1965

Kilmarnock (Scotland)	1–0	(Albania) 17 Nëntori
Black 76'	Report

Rugby Park, Kilmarnock
Attendance: 15,816
Referee: Birger Nilsen (Norway)

Kilmarnock won 1–0 on aggregate.

29 September 1965

Sparta Prague (Czechoslovakia)	4–0	(Switzerland) Lausanne-Sports
Mráz 20', 24', 76'; Dyba 82'	Report

Stadion Letná, Prague
Attendance: 14,659
Referee: Ferdinand Marschall (Austria)

Sparta Prague won 4–0 on aggregate.

3 October 1965

Levski Sofia (Bulgaria)	6–0	(Sweden) Djurgårdens IF
Asparuhov 13', 18'; Iliev 33', 47'; Nikolov 34'; Abadzhiev 58'	Report

Stadion Levski, Sofia
Attendance: 15,769
Referee: Othmar Huber (Switzerland)

Levski Sofia won 7–2 on aggregate.

5 October 1965

Benfica (Portugal)	10–0	(Luxembourg) Stade Dudelange
Eusébio 5', 29', 31', 81'; Augusto 12', 23', 59'; Pinto 49'; Guerreiro 54'; Torres 70'	Report

Estadio da Luz, Lisbon
Attendance: 4,598
Referee: Robert Lacoste (France)

Benfica won 18–0 on aggregate.

6 October 1965

Boldklubben 1909 (Denmark)	2–3	(Romania) Dinamo București
Petersen 29'; Hansen 34'	Report	Nunweiller 7'; Pârcălab 18'; Ene 44'

Odense Stadion, Odense
Attendance: 7,596
Referee: Jean Tricot (France)

Dinamo București won 7–2 on aggregate.

6 October 1965

Manchester United (England)	6–0	(Finland) HJK
Connelly 15', 47', 70'; Best 45', 50'; Charlton 60'	Report

Old Trafford, Manchester
Attendance: 30,388
Referee: Manuel Rodrigues (Portugal)

Manchester United won 9–2 on aggregate.

10 October 1965

Sliema Wanderers (Malta)	1–0	(Greece) Panathinaikos
Micallef 30'	Report

Manoel Island Football Ground, Gżira
Attendance: 7,697
Referee: Concetto Lo Bello (Italy)

Panathinaikos won 4–2 on aggregate.

13 October 1965

Werder Bremen (West Germany)	5–0	(Cyprus) APOEL
Danielsen 36', 54'; Ferner 41'; Höttges 64', 83' (pen.)	Report

Weserstadion, Bremen
Attendance: 11,999
Referee: Tage Sørensen (Denmark)

Werder Bremen won 10–0 on aggregate.

13 October 1965

Nantes (France)	2–2	(Socialist Federal Republic of Yugoslavia) Partizan
Magny 32'; Blanchet 68'	Report	Kovačević 42'; Galić 48'

Stade Marcel-Saupin, Nantes
Attendance: 16,007
Referee: Gaspar Pintado Viu (Spain)

Partizan won 4–2 on aggregate.

== Bracket ==
First round
(Belgium) Anderlecht	9	–	9
(Northern Ireland) Derry City	0	–	0
(Scotland) Kilmarnock	2	1	3
(Spain) Real Madrid	2	5	7
(Romania) Dinamo Bucuresti	2	0	2
(Italy) Inter Milan	1	2	3
(Hungary) Ferencváros	0	3	3
(Greece) Panathinaikos	0	1	1
(Czechoslovakia) Sparta Prague	3	2	5
(Poland) Górnik Zabrze	0	1	1
(Socialist Federal Republic of Yugoslavia) Partizan	3	0	3
(West Germany) Werder Bremen	0	1	1
(East Germany) Vorwärts Berlin	0	1	1
(England) Manchester United	2	3	5
(Bulgaria) Levski Sofia	2	2	4
(Portugal) Benfica	2	3	5

Quarter-finals
(Belgium) Anderlecht	1	2	3
(Spain) Real Madrid	0	4	4
(Italy) Inter Milan	4	1	5
(Hungary) Ferencváros	0	1	1
(Czechoslovakia) Sparta Prague	4	0	4
(Socialist Federal Republic of Yugoslavia) Partizan	1	5	6
(England) Manchester United	3	5	8
(Portugal) Benfica	2	1	3

Semi-finals
(Spain) Real Madrid	1	1	2
(Italy) Inter Milan	0	1	1
(Socialist Federal Republic of Yugoslavia) Partizan	2	0	2
(England) Manchester United	0	1	1

Final
(Spain) Real Madrid	2
(Socialist Federal Republic of Yugoslavia) Partizan	1

== First round ==
Team 1	Agg.	Team 2	1st leg	2nd leg
Anderlecht (Belgium)	9–0	(Northern Ireland) Derry City	9–0	(w/o) (Note: There were serious concerns regarding Brandywell Stadium state of the pitch, with IFA informing UEFA that it's not fit to host European Cup tie and ordering Derry City to play either at Windsor Park or Showgrounds, which club's board refusued to do. However, minutes after losing first leg 9–0, board directors had officially informed Anderlecht that they would be forfeiting the second leg of the tie.)
Kilmarnock (Scotland)	3–7	(Spain) Real Madrid	2–2	1–5
Dinamo București (Romania)	2–3	(Italy) Inter Milan	2–1	0–2
Ferencváros (Hungary)	3–1	(Greece) Panathinaikos	0–0	3–1
Sparta Prague (Czechoslovakia)	5–1	(Poland) Górnik Zabrze	3–0	2–1
Partizan (Socialist Federal Republic of Yugoslavia)	3–1	(West Germany) Werder Bremen	3–0	0–1
Vorwärts Berlin (East Germany)	1–5	(England) Manchester United	0–2	1–3
Levski Sofia (Bulgaria)	4–5	(Portugal) Benfica	2–2	2–3

=== First leg ===
9 November 1965

Partizan (Socialist Federal Republic of Yugoslavia)	3–0	(West Germany) Werder Bremen
Jusufi 69'; Hasanagić 75'; Pirmajer 88'	Report

Stadion JNA, Belgrade
Attendance: 24,203
Referee: Bruno de Marchi (Italy)

10 November 1965

Levski Sofia (Bulgaria)	2–2	(Portugal) Benfica
Asparuhov 5'; Nikolov 59'	Report	Eusébio 22', 63'

Stadion Levski, Sofia
Attendance: 25,315
Referee: Gyula Gere (Hungary)

10 November 1965

Ferencváros (Hungary)	0–0	(Greece) Panathinaikos
	Report

Népstadion, Budapest
Attendance: 12,278
Referee: Joseph Hannet (Belgium)

17 November 1965

Vorwärts Berlin (East Germany)	0–2	(England) Manchester United
	Report	Law 72'; Connelly 80'

Walter-Ulbricht-Stadion, Berlin
Attendance: 23,230
Referee: Hans Carlsson (Sweden)

17 November 1965

Kilmarnock (Scotland)	2–2	(Spain) Real Madrid
McLean 20' (pen.); McInally 70'	Report	Pirri 25'; Amancio 65'

Rugby Park, Kilmarnock
Attendance: 25,385
Referee: Gerhard Schulenburg (West Germany)

23 November 1965

Anderlecht (Belgium)	9–0	(Northern Ireland) Derry City
Jurion 5'; Van Himst 13', 74'; Puis 43', 83'; Mulder 46', 48', 65'; Stockman 89'	Report

Stade Émile Versé, Brussels
Attendance: 23,589
Referee: Joaquim Fernandes Campos (Portugal)

24 November 1965

Sparta Prague (Czechoslovakia)	3–0	(Poland) Górnik Zabrze
Kvašňák 35' (pen.); Jílek 64'; Vrána 80'	Report

Stadion Letná, Prague
Attendance: 19,491
Referee: Rudi Glöckner (East Germany)

1 December 1965

Dinamo București (Romania)	2–1	(Italy) Inter Milan
Frățilă 26'; Haidu 51'	Report	Peiró 12'

Stadionul August 23, Bucharest
Attendance: 18,912
Referee: Karl Göppel (Switzerland)

=== Second leg ===
17 November 1965

Panathinaikos (Greece)	1–3	(Hungary) Ferencváros
Domazos 48'	Report	Karába 8'; Fenyvesi 27'; Albert 63'

Leoforos Alexandras Stadium, Athens
Attendance: 24,919
Referee: Vladimir Stanković (Yugoslavia)

Ferencváros won 3–1 on aggregate.

17 November 1965

Werder Bremen (West Germany)	1–0	(Socialist Federal Republic of Yugoslavia) Partizan
Schütz 33'	Report

Weserstadion, Bremen
Attendance: 28,478
Referee: Tiny Wharton (Scotland)

Partizan won 3–1 on aggregate.

28 November 1965

Górnik Zabrze (Poland)	1–2	(Czechoslovakia) Sparta Prague
Szołtysik 84'	Report	Mráz 17', 78'

Stadion Śląski, Chorzów
Attendance: 46,609
Referee: Alexandru Toth (Romania)

Sparta Prague won 5–1 on aggregate.

1 December 1965

Real Madrid (Spain)	5–1	(Scotland) Kilmarnock
Pirri 25', 90'; Ruiz 26'; Grosso 36'; Gento 58'	Report	McIlroy 21'

Santiago Bernabéu, Madrid
Attendance: 26,879
Referee: Giulio Campanati (Italy)

Real Madrid won 7–3 on aggregate.

1 December 1965

Manchester United (England)	3–1	(East Germany) Vorwärts Berlin
Herd 10', 40', 89'	Report	Piepenburg 82'

Old Trafford, Manchester
Attendance: 30,082
Referee: Juan Gardeazábal (Spain)

Manchester United won 5–1 on aggregate.

8 December 1965

Benfica (Portugal)	3–2	(Bulgaria) Levski Sofia
Eusébio 6'; Coluna 27'; Torres 47'	Report	Asparuhov 3', 73'

Estádio da Luz, Lisbon
Attendance: 39,992
Referee: Henri Faucheux (France)

Benfica won 5–4 on aggregate.

15 December 1965

Derry City (Northern Ireland)	Cancelled	(Belgium) Anderlecht
	Report

Brandywell Stadium, Derry

There were serious concerns regarding the state of the Brandywell Stadium pitch. The IFA informed UEFA that it was unfit to host the European Cup tie. THE IFA ordered Derry City to play either at Windsor Park or Showgrounds, which the Derry board refused to do. However, minutes after losing the first leg 9–0, the Derry directors officially informed Anderlecht that they would be forfeiting the second leg of the tie.

Anderlecht won 9–0 on aggregate.

16 December 1965

Inter Milan (Italy)	2–0	(Romania) Dinamo București
Mazzola 67' (pen.); Facchetti 89'	Report

San Siro, Milan
Attendance: 15,324
Referee: Franz Mayer (Austria)

Inter Milan won 3–2 on aggregate.

== Quarter-finals ==
Team 1	Agg.	Team 2	1st leg	2nd leg
Anderlecht (Belgium)	3–4	(Spain) Real Madrid	1–0	2–4
Inter Milan (Italy)	5–1	(Hungary) Ferencváros	4–0	1–1
Sparta Prague (Czechoslovakia)	4–6	(Socialist Federal Republic of Yugoslavia) Partizan	4–1	0–5
Manchester United (England)	8–3	(Portugal) Benfica	3–2	5–1

=== First leg ===
2 February 1966

Manchester United (England)	3–2	(Portugal) Benfica
Herd 35'; Law 45'; Foulkes 60'	Report	Augusto 10'; Torres 80'

Old Trafford, Manchester
Attendance: 64,035
Referee: Karol Galba (Czechoslovakia)

23 February 1966

Anderlecht (Belgium)	1–0	(Spain) Real Madrid
Van Himst 2'	Report

Stade Émile Versé, Brussels
Attendance: 34,862
Referee: Tiny Wharton (Scotland)

23 February 1966

Inter Milan (Italy)	4–0	(Hungary) Ferencváros
Jair 8'; Corso 36'; Peiró 65', 73'	Report

San Siro, Milan
Attendance: 36,896
Referee: Manuel Gómez Arribas (Spain)

2 March 1966

Sparta Prague (Czechoslovakia)	4–1	(Socialist Federal Republic of Yugoslavia) Partizan
Kvašňák 20', 56' (pen.), 86'; Mašek 74'	Report	Hasanagić 16'

Stadion Letná, Prague
Attendance: 30,214
Referee: Gyula Emsberger (Hungary)

=== Second leg ===
2 March 1966

Ferencváros (Hungary)	1–1	(Italy) Inter Milan
Novák 32' (pen.)	Report	Domenghini 63'

Népstadion, Budapest
Attendance: 70,425
Referee: Kurt Tschenscher (West Germany)

Inter Milan won 5–1 on aggregate.

9 March 1966

Real Madrid (Spain)	4–2	(Belgium) Anderlecht
Amancio 14', 35'; Gento 59' (pen.), 83'	Report	Jurion 87'; Puis 89'

Santiago Bernabéu, Madrid
Attendance: 54,415
Referee: Joseph Barbéran (France)

Real Madrid won 4–3 on aggregate.

9 March 1966

Partizan (Socialist Federal Republic of Yugoslavia)	5–0	(Czechoslovakia) Sparta Prague
Kovačević 4', 29'; Vasović 23'; Hasanagić 35', 71'	Report

Stadion JNA, Belgrade
Attendance: 36,912
Referee: Dimitar Rumentschev (Bulgaria)

Partizan won 6–4 on aggregate.

9 March 1966

Benfica (Portugal)	1–5	(England) Manchester United
Brennan 51' (o.g.)	Report	Best 6', 11'; Connelly 14'; Crerand 76'; Charlton 87'

Estádio da Luz, Lisbon
Attendance: 54,232
Referee: Concetto Lo Bello (Italy)

Manchester United won 8–3 on aggregate.

== Semi-finals ==
Team 1	Agg.	Team 2	1st leg	2nd leg
Real Madrid (Spain)	2–1	(Italy) Inter Milan	1–0	1–1
Partizan (Socialist Federal Republic of Yugoslavia)	2–1	(England) Manchester United	2–0	0–1

=== First leg ===
13 April 1966

Real Madrid (Spain)	1–0	(Italy) Inter Milan
Pirri 13'	Report

Santiago Bernabéu, Madrid
Attendance: 54,232
Referee: Dimitris Wlachojanis (Austria)

13 April 1966

Partizan (Socialist Federal Republic of Yugoslavia)	2–0	(England) Manchester United
Hasanagić 46'; Bečejac 58'	Report

Stadin JNA, Belgrade
Attendance: 37,031
Referee: Kurt Tschenscher (West Germany)

=== Second leg ===
20 April 1966

Inter Milan (Italy)	1–1	(Spain) Real Madrid
Facchetti 78'	Report	Amancio 20'

San Siro, Milan
Attendance: 75,991
Referee: György Vadas (Hungary)

Real Madrid won 2–1 on aggregate.

20 April 1966

Manchester United (England)	1–0	(Socialist Federal Republic of Yugoslavia) Partizan
Šoškić 75' (o.g.)	Report

Old Trafford, Manchester
Attendance: 61,475
Referee: Gottfried Dienst (Switzerland)

Partizan won 2–1 on aggregate.

== Final ==
11 May 1966
19:30 CET

Real Madrid (Spain)	2–1	(Socialist Federal Republic of Yugoslavia) Partizan
Amancio 70'; Serena 76'	Report	Vasović 55'

Heysel Stadium, Brussels
Attendance: 46,745
Referee: Rudolf Kreitlein (West Germany)

== Top goalscorers ==
The top scorers from the 1965–66 European Cup (including preliminary round) were as follows:

Rank	Player	Team	Goals
1	(Hungary) Flórián Albert	(Hungary) Ferencváros	7
1	(Portugal) Eusébio	(Portugal) Benfica	7
3	(England) John Connelly	(England) Manchester United	6
3	(Socialist Federal Republic of Yugoslavia) Mustafa Hasanagić	(Socialist Federal Republic of Yugoslavia) Partizan	6
5	(Spain) Amancio	(Spain) Real Madrid	5
5	(Bulgaria) Georgi Asparuhov	(Bulgaria) Levski Sofia	5
5	(Scotland) David Herd	(England) Manchester United	5
5	(Czechoslovakia) Ivan Mráz	(Czechoslovakia) Sparta Prague	5
5	(Hungary) Ferenc Puskás	(Spain) Real Madrid	5
10	(Portugal) José Augusto	(Portugal) Benfica	4
10	(Northern Ireland) George Best	(England) Manchester United	4
10	(Czechoslovakia) Andrej Kvašňák	(Czechoslovakia) Sparta Prague	4
10	(Spain) Pirri	(Spain) Real Madrid	4
10	(Belgium) Jacques Stockman	(Belgium) Anderlecht	4
10	(Belgium) Paul Van Himst	(Belgium) Anderlecht	4
