= Schnarr =

Schnarr (Middle Low German, Middle High German snar "string", snarmeker "roper") is a German-language surname. Notable people with the name include:

- Steven Schnarr (born 1952), American football player
- Werner Schnarr (1903–1959), Canadian ice hockey player
- Wolfgang Schnarr (1941–2025), German footballer

== See also ==
- Schnur
- Seiler
