= 1964–65 Bundesliga =

2nd season of the Bundesliga

Bundesliga
- Season: 1964–65
- Dates: 22 August 1964 – 15 May 1965
- Champions: Werder Bremen; 1st Bundesliga title 1st German title
- Relegated: Hertha BSC (licence revoked)
- European Cup: Werder Bremen
- Cup Winners' Cup: Borussia Dortmund
- Matches played: 240
- Goals scored: 796 (3.32 per match)
- Top goalscorer: Rudolf Brunnenmeier (24)
- Biggest home win: 1860 Munich 9–0 Karlsruhe
- Biggest away win: E. Frankfurt 0–7 Karlsruhe
- Highest scoring: 1860 Munich 6–4 Hertha BSC

The 1964–65 Bundesliga was the second season of the Bundesliga, West Germany's premier football league. It began on 22 August 1964 and ended on 15 May 1965. 1. FC Köln were the defending champions.

== Season overview ==
The championship was won by Werder Bremen. Schalke 04 and Karlsruher SC were originally going to be demoted to the Regionalliga. However, the German FA became aware of irregularities regarding transfer fees, signing bonuses and player wages paid by Hertha BSC. A cash audit was ordered, and the evidence collected from there was enough to revoke Hertha's license. In order to avoid any legal battles over Bundesliga membership, the FA decided to expand the league from sixteen to eighteen teams, meaning Schalke and Karlsruhe were spared relegation. Since Berlin should have a representative in the league as well, Tasmania Berlin were promoted besides the winners of the promotion play-off groups for the 1965–66 season.

The 1964–65 season saw the debut of Brazilian players in the Bundesliga. Zézé became the first Brazilian to play in the league when he fielded for 1. FC Köln against Hertha BSC on 22 August 1964 while Raoul Tagliari scored the first-ever Bundesliga goal by a Brazilian for Meidericher SV against 1. FC Nürnberg on 21 November 1964.

== Teams ==
Preußen Münster and 1. FC Saarbrücken were relegated to the Regionalliga after finishing in the last two places. They were replaced by Hannover 96 and Borussia Neunkirchen, who won their respective promotion play-off groups.

Location of teams in Bundesliga 1964–65

Club	Ground	Capacity
Hertha BSC	Olympiastadion	100,000
Eintracht Braunschweig	Eintracht-Stadion	38,000
SV Werder Bremen	Weserstadion	32,000
Borussia Dortmund	Stadion Rote Erde	30,000
Eintracht Frankfurt	Waldstadion	87,000
Hamburger SV	Volksparkstadion	80,000
Hannover 96	Niedersachsenstadion	86,000
1. FC Kaiserslautern	Stadion Betzenberg	42,000
Karlsruher SC	Wildparkstadion	50,000
1. FC Köln	Müngersdorfer Stadion	76,000
Meidericher SV	Wedaustadion	38,500
TSV 1860 Munich	Stadion an der Grünwalder Straße	44,000
Borussia Neunkirchen	Ellenfeld	32,000
1. FC Nürnberg	Städtisches Stadion	64,238
FC Schalke 04	Glückauf-Kampfbahn	35,000
VfB Stuttgart	Neckarstadion	53,000

== League table ==
Pos	Team	Pld	W	D	L	GF	GA	GR	Pts	Qualification or relegation
1	Werder Bremen (C)	30	15	11	4	54	29	1.862	41	Qualification to European Cup preliminary round
2	1. FC Köln	30	14	10	6	66	45	1.467	38	Qualification to Inter-Cities Fairs Cup first round
3	Borussia Dortmund	30	15	6	9	67	48	1.396	36	Qualification to Cup Winners' Cup first round
4	1860 Munich	30	14	7	9	70	50	1.400	35	Qualification to Inter-Cities Fairs Cup first round
5	Hannover 96	30	13	7	10	48	42	1.143	33	Qualification to Inter-Cities Fairs Cup second round
6	1. FC Nürnberg	30	11	10	9	44	38	1.158	32	Qualification to Inter-Cities Fairs Cup first round
7	Meidericher SV	30	12	8	10	46	48	0.958	32	
8	Eintracht Frankfurt	30	11	7	12	50	58	0.862	29	
9	Eintracht Braunschweig	30	10	8	12	42	47	0.894	28	
10	Borussia Neunkirchen	30	9	9	12	44	48	0.917	27	
11	Hamburger SV	30	11	5	14	46	56	0.821	27	
12	VfB Stuttgart	30	9	8	13	46	50	0.920	26	
13	1. FC Kaiserslautern	30	11	3	16	41	53	0.774	25	
14	Hertha BSC (R)	30	7	11	12	40	62	0.645	25	Relegation to Regionalliga (Note: Hertha BSC had their license revoked because of financial irregularities. Karlsruher SC and Schalke 04 were spared relegation, the league was expanded to eighteen teams.)
15	Karlsruher SC	30	9	6	15	47	62	0.758	24	
16	Schalke 04	30	7	8	15	45	60	0.750	22	

Source: www.dfb.de (in German)
Rules for classification: 1) points; 2) goal ratio.
(C) Champions; (R) Relegated

== Results ==
Home \ Away	BSC	EBS	SVW	BVB	SGE	HSV	H96	FCK	KSC	KOE	MSV	M60	BNE	FCN	S04	VFB
Hertha BSC	—	0–3	0–0	0–0	1–3	0–0	1–1	5–3	2–1	1–3	2–2	2–1	1–1	1–2	2–1	0–0
Eintracht Braunschweig	1–1	—	1–1	0–1	3–2	2–0	2–2	2–0	3–0	1–1	0–1	1–1	1–0	1–0	1–2	2–1
Werder Bremen	5–1	5–1	—	3–0	2–2	0–0	3–0	1–1	1–0	0–0	1–0	3–2	2–0	1–1	2–2	1–0
Borussia Dortmund	6–3	5–4	1–2	—	1–3	2–0	0–2	3–2	5–1	2–2	0–0	1–1	5–1	2–1	4–0	1–0
Eintracht Frankfurt	3–0	2–2	0–2	0–2	—	2–1	3–3	1–2	0–7	1–4	2–3	4–1	1–0	1–1	2–2	2–3
Hamburger SV	4–1	0–1	0–4	1–4	2–1	—	3–0	3–2	2–1	0–0	3–0	3–2	1–2	2–1	2–4	2–2
Hannover 96	3–1	2–2	1–2	2–0	3–2	1–2	—	4–0	4–2	2–0	2–0	0–2	1–1	2–2	1–0	2–1
1. FC Kaiserslautern	1–2	2–1	2–1	1–3	0–1	2–1	1–0	—	0–1	2–2	2–0	1–2	2–0	3–2	3–0	2–1
Karlsruher SC	0–1	3–0	0–2	2–0	3–1	2–2	2–3	6–1	—	2–4	2–1	1–5	2–1	1–1	2–2	0–0
1. FC Köln	2–3	5–1	4–2	3–3	3–4	3–0	0–1	3–0	4–1	—	1–2	1–1	4–3	0–0	2–1	2–1
Meidericher SV	2–2	2–0	2–2	3–2	1–3	3–2	1–0	3–1	1–1	0–3	—	3–0	1–1	2–0	2–1	3–3
1860 Munich	6–4	2–0	3–1	4–4	0–1	4–1	4–0	2–2	9–0	2–3	2–1	—	4–2	2–0	3–1	1–0
Borussia Neunkirchen	2–2	0–0	1–1	1–2	4–0	3–1	2–1	0–3	1–0	1–1	4–2	3–0	—	1–1	3–2	3–1
1. FC Nürnberg	2–0	3–2	2–3	1–0	0–0	2–3	1–0	1–0	4–1	3–0	1–1	2–2	2–0	—	3–2	1–1
Schalke 04	3–0	0–3	1–0	2–6	1–1	3–1	2–2	1–0	1–1	2–3	1–2	2–2	1–1	1–3	—	3–1
VfB Stuttgart	1–1	3–1	1–1	3–2	1–2	2–4	0–3	1–0	1–2	3–3	4–2	3–0	3–2	3–1	2–1	—

Source: DFB
Legend: Blue = home team win; Yellow = draw; Red = away team win.

== Top goalscorers ==
24 goals

- (Germany) Rudolf Brunnenmeier (1860 Munich)

22 goals

- (Germany) Friedhelm Konietzka (Borussia Dortmund)

19 goals

- (Germany) Christian Müller (1. FC Köln)

15 goals

- (Germany) Heinz Strehl (1. FC Nürnberg)

14 goals

- (Germany) Franz Brungs (Borussia Dortmund)
- (Germany) Uwe Seeler (Hamburger SV)

12 goals

- (Germany) Peter Grosser (1860 Munich)
- (Germany) Hartmann Madl (Karlsruher SC)
- (Germany) Klaus Matischak (FC Schalke 04)
- (Germany) Elmar May (Borussia Neunkirchen)
- (Germany) Karl-Heinz Thielen (1. FC Köln)
- (Germany) Lothar Ulsaß (Eintracht Braunschweig)

== Champion squad ==
SV Werder Bremen
Goalkeeper: Günter Bernard (30).

Defenders: Horst-Dieter Höttges (29 / 1); Sepp Piontek (28 / 3); Helmut Jagielski (26); Heinz Steinmann (26); Wolfgang Bordel (1).
Midfielders: Diethelm Ferner (29 / 1); Arnold Schütz (28 / 10); Max Lorenz (27 / 2); Willi Soya (8 / 2); Helmut Schimeczek (6).
Forwards: Gerhard Zebrowski (28 / 11); Klaus Matischak (19 / 12); Hans Schulz (19 / 4); Theo Klöckner (17 / 4); Klaus Hänel (7 / 1); Dieter Thun (2).
(league appearances and goals listed in brackets)

Manager: Willi Multhaup.

On the roster but have not played in a league game: Klaus Lambertz; Horst Dudjahn; Walter Nachtwey; Erwin Jung.
