= Georg Knöpfle =

German footballer (1904–1987)

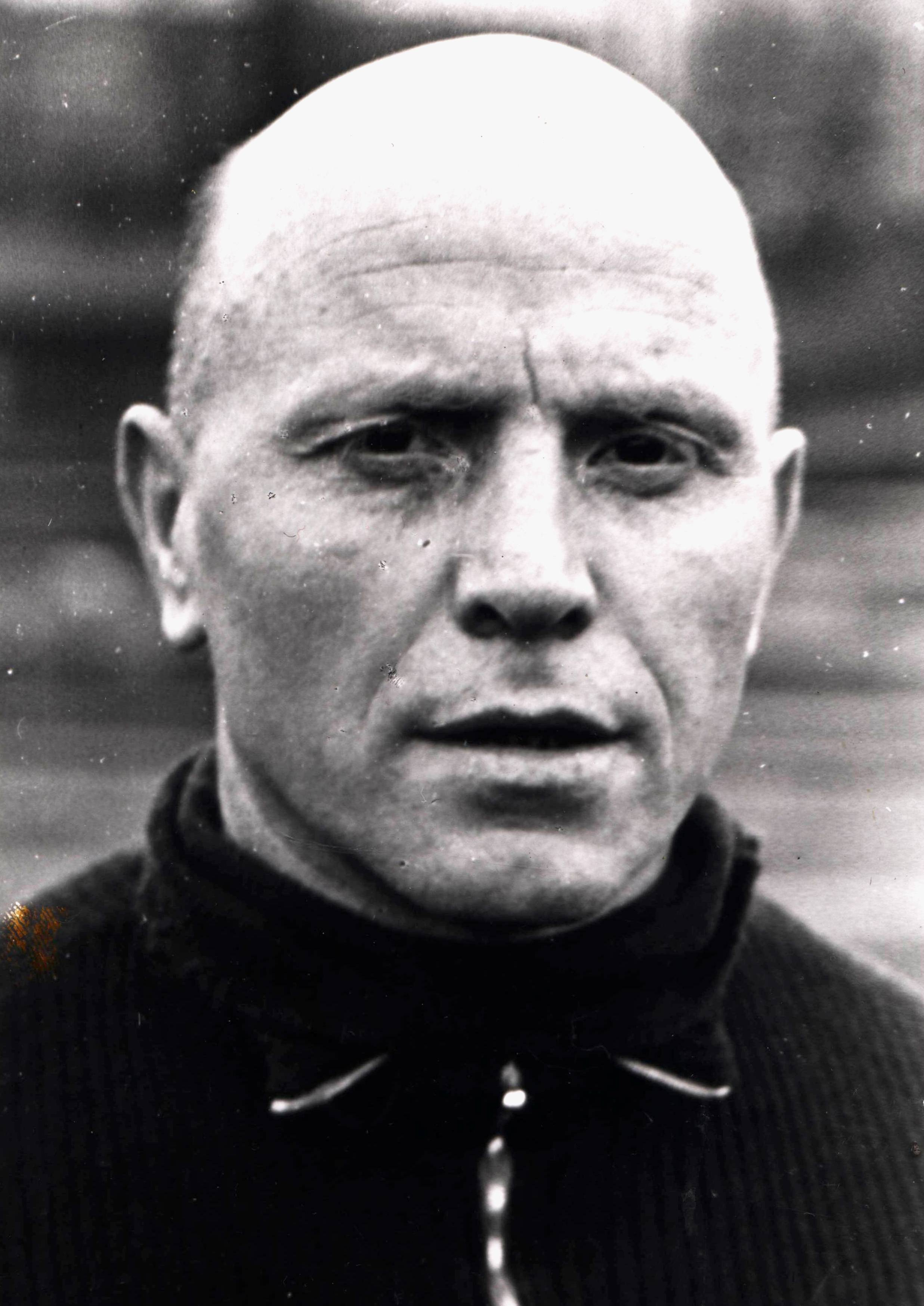
- Knöpfle in 1965

Personal information
- Date of birth: 15 May 1904
- Place of birth: Schramberg, Germany
- Date of death: 14 December 1987 (aged 83)
- Place of death: Hamburg, West Germany
- Position: Defender

Youth career
- 1913–1926: SpVgg Schramberg 08

Senior career*
| Years | Team | Apps | (Gls) |
| 1926–1928 | SpVgg Fürth | | |
| 1928–1934 | FSV Frankfurt | | |

International career
| 1928–1933 | Germany | 23 | (0) |

Managerial career
- 1937–1948: Eintracht Braunschweig
- 1948–1949: Arminia Hannover
- 1949–1954: Hamburger SV
- 1954: Bayern Munich
- 1955–1958: Alemannia Aachen
- 1958–1963: Werder Bremen
- 1963–1966: 1. FC Köln
- 1969–1970: Hamburger SV
- * Club domestic league appearances and goals

Georg "Schorsch" Knöpfle (15 May 1904 – 14 December 1987) was a German football player and coach. As a player, he received 23 international caps and was part of the German squad at the 1928 Summer Olympics.

== Honours ==
1. FC Köln

- Bundesliga: 1963–64; runner-up 1964–65

Werder Bremen

- DFB-Pokal: 1961
