= Multhaup =

Multhaup is a surname. Notable people with the surname include:

- Maurice Multhaup (born 1996), German footballer
- Willi Multhaup (1903–1982), German football manager
