= 1960–61 DFB-Pokal =

Tournament details
- Country: West Germany
- Teams: 16

Final positions
- Champions: SV Werder Bremen
- Runner-up: 1. FC Kaiserslautern

Tournament statistics
- Matches played: 15
- Goals scored: 56 (3.73 per match)
- Top goal scorer(s): Horst Häfner, Klaus Hänel, Willy Reitgaßl (3)

The 1960–61 DFB-Pokal was the 18th season of the annual German football cup competition. It began on 28 July 1961 and ended on 13 September 1961. 16 teams competed in the tournament of four rounds. In the final Werder Bremen defeated Kaiserslautern 2–0.

== Matches ==
=== Round of 16 ===
28 July 1961
20:00

Eintracht Frankfurt	2 – 3 (a.e.t.)	1. FC Köln
Stein 10'; Horn 44'	report (in German)	Schäfer 69', 70'; Müller 102'

Waldstadion, Frankfurt
Attendance: 12.000
Referee: Edgar Deuschel (Ludwigshafen)

29 July 1961
17:30

1. FC Saarbrücken	0 – 1	SV Werder Bremen
	report (in German)	Schröder 34'

Ludwigsparkstadion, Saarbrücken
Attendance: 5.000
Referee: Fritz Leidag (Dortmund)

29 July 1961
17:30

Tasmania 1900 Berlin	4 – 1	Altonaer FC 93
Schlichting 29', 65'; Rosenfeldt 79'; Bäsler 85'	report (in German)	Kurth 39'

Olympiastadion, Berlin
Attendance: 4.000
Referee: Josef Hense (Oberhausen)

29 July 1961
17:30

VfV Hildesheim	1 – 2	VfB Stuttgart
Klose 80'	report (in German)	Geiger 33'; Weise 76'

Friedrich-Ebert-Stadion, Hildesheim
Attendance: 7.000
Referee: Günther Ternieden (Oberhausen)

29 July 1961
17:30

FK Pirmasens	3 – 2	VfL Bochum
Kapitulski 2'; Matischak 17', 89'	report (in German)	Backhaus 9'; Kurtenbach 22'

Stadion an der Zweibrücker Straße, Pirmasens
Attendance: 2.500
Referee: Matelski (Bremen)

29 July 1961
17:30

SF Hamborn 07	3 – 1	SV Waldhof Mannheim
Häfner 13', 50', 68'	report (in German)	Schöttle 37'

August-Thyssen-Stadion, Duisburg
Attendance: 7.500
Referee: Werner Spiewak (Hamburg)

29 July 1961
17:30

1. FC Kaiserslautern	2 – 0	Heider SV 1925
Settelmeyer 20'; Liebrich 71'	report (in German)

Betzenbergstadion, Kaiserslautern
Attendance: 1.500
Referee: Fritz Schörnich (Düsseldorf)

29 July 1961
20:00

Karlsruher SC	7 – 2	Wuppertaler SV Borussia
Herrmann 6', 31'; Schwall 25'; Reitgaßl 34', 80'; Wischnowsky 68'; Marx 74'	report (in German)	Schulz 5'; Sauer 13'

Wildparkstadion, Karlsruhe
Attendance: 5.000
Referee: Willi Ommerborn (Saarbrücken)

=== Quarter-finals ===
16 August 1961
17:30

SV Werder Bremen	3 – 2	1. FC Köln
Hänel 14', 44' (pen.), 88'	report (in German)	Thielen 64'; Habig 65'

Weserstadion, Bremen
Attendance: 15.000
Referee: Rudolf Kreitlein (Stuttgart)

16 August 1961
17:30

VfB Stuttgart	0 – 1	Karlsruher SC
	report (in German)	Marx 28'

Neckarstadion, Stuttgart
Attendance: 15.000
Referee: Josef Kandlbinder (Regensburg)

16 August 1961
17:30

SF Hamborn 07	3 – 2 (a.e.t.)	FK Pirmasens
Schwikart 2'; Jesih 61'; Plich 91'	report (in German)	Kapitulski 24', 35' (pen.)

August-Thyssen-Stadion, Duisburg
Attendance: 11.000
Referee: Kurt Handwerker (Ketsch)

16 August 1961
17:30

1. FC Kaiserslautern	2 – 1 (a.e.t.)	Tasmania 1900 Berlin
Kasperski 34'; Richter 94'	report (in German)	Schneider 52' (o.g.)

Betzenbergstadion, Kaiserslautern
Attendance: 4.000
Referee: Rudolf Eisemann (Spechbach)

=== Semi-finals ===
23 August 1961
17:15

SF Hamborn 07	1 – 2	1. FC Kaiserslautern
Schwikart 70'	report (in German)	Horn 59'; Bauer 81'

August-Thyssen-Stadion, Duisburg
Attendance: 18.000
Referee: Walter Zimmermann (Wolfsburg)

23 August 1961
20:00

SV Werder Bremen	3 – 2 (a.e.t.)	Karlsruher SC
Soya 29'; Wilmovius 83'; Schütz 100'	report (in German)	Nedoschil 19'; Reitgaßl 72'

Weserstadion, Bremen
Attendance: 32.000
Referee: Fritz Schörnich (Düsseldorf)

=== Final ===
13 September 1961
19:30 CET

Werder Bremen	2–0	1. FC Kaiserslautern
Schröder 10'; Jagielski 52'	Report

Glückauf-Kampfbahn, Gelsenkirchen
Attendance: 18,000
Referee: Günter Sparing (Kassel)
