= Zézé (footballer, born 1942) =

Brazilian footballer (1942–2006)

Personal information
- Full name: José Gilson Rodriguez
- Date of birth: 18 December 1942
- Place of birth: Varginha, Minas Gerais, Brazil
- Date of death: 31 May 2006 (aged 63)
- Position: Forward

Senior career*
Years	Team	Apps	(Gls)
1960	Madureira		
1960–1964	Guaratinguetá		
1964	Madureira		
1964–1965	1. FC Köln	5	(1)
1965–1967	Portuguesa		
1968	Santo André		
1969	Rio Branco		
1969	Atlético Paranaense		
1970	Bangu		
1970	Flamengo		
- * Club domestic league appearances and goals

José Gilson Rodriguez, commonly called Zézé, (18 December 1942 – 31 May 2006) was a Brazilian professional footballer who played as a forward for, among other clubs, 1. FC Köln in the Bundesliga.

Zézé was the first-ever Brazilian player in the German Bundesliga but left the country after being diagnosed with a snow allergy.

== Career ==
Zézé spend his early career with Madureira, Guaratinguetá and Madureira again before being signed by 1. FC Köln in the summer of 1964, on the advice of Polish player agent Julius Ukrainczyk, without ever having been scouted by a representative of the club. He was signed for a then club record fee of DM 150,000 and allegedly arrived in Cologne on a Banana boat from Brazil. Zézé impressed the club in warm up matches before the start of the season, raising hopes he would be a miracle forward.

Zézé made his debut for 1. FC Köln on 22 August 1964 in a 3–2 loss to Hertha BSC. He played one more game for the club in 1964, in December against 1. FC Nürnberg. Zézé's next appearance in a competitive match for Köln was on 20 February 1965 when he played against Eintracht Braunschweig. He made an appearance in a 0–0 away draw at Liverpool F.C. in the quarter final of the European Cup in March, with 1. FC Köln exiting the 1964–65 edition after three drawn games on coin toss. Zézé then played two more Bundesliga matches, against Karlsruher SC and 1. FC Kaiserslautern. In the latter he registered his only goal for Köln in a competitive match when he scored the first goal in a 3–0 win. He was however not the first Brazilian to score in the Bundesliga, with Raoul Tagliari already having done so in a match for Meidericher SV against 1. FC Nürnberg on 21 November 1964, making his Bundesliga debut in this game three month after Zézé.

Zézé found it difficult to cope with the German winter and was diagnosed by a Spanish doctor with a snow allergy, leaving Cologne and not making another appearance for the club, Köln cancelling his contract and the Brazilian returning home. 1. FC Köln who had won the inaugural Bundesliga championship in 1963–64, went on to finish the 1964–65 season as runners-up, three points behind SV Werder Bremen.

Upon his return he played for Portuguesa, Santo André, Rio Branco, Atlético Paranaense, Bangu and Flamengo in his home country of Brazil.

== Honours ==
1. FC Köln

- Bundesliga runner-up: 1964–65
