= Günther Michl =

German footballer (1950–2025)

- Michl in 1970

Personal information
- Full name: Günther Michl
- Date of birth: 30 May 1950
- Place of birth: Munich, Bavaria, West Germany
- Date of death: 17 March 2025 (aged 74)
- Position: Forward

Youth career
- ???–1969: Bayern Munich youth

Senior career*
Years	Team	Apps	(Gls)
1969–1970	Bayern Munich	17	(2)
1970–1974	1. FC Nürnberg	79	(20)
1974–1976	FK Pirmasens	56	(6)
1976–1978	FC Bayern Hof	72	(22)
1979–1980	1. FC Saarbrücken	40	(2)
Total		219	(94)
- * Club domestic league appearances and goals

Günther Michl (30 May 1950 – 17 March 2025) was a German footballer. He was known for his brief stint with Bayern Munich for the 1969–70 season before playing in the Regionalliga and the 2. Bundesliga for various clubs throughout the 1970s, also playing for 1. FC Saarbrücken during their singular season in the Bundesliga.

== Career ==
=== Bayern Munich ===
Emerging from the youth sector of Bayern Munich as one of the many discoveries of the legendary talent scout Rudi Weiß, Michl was part of the professional squad of the Bundesliga club at the age of 19, for which he made his debut on the first matchday held on 16 August 1969 in the 4–0 win in the home game against Rot-Weiss Essen. With his only two goals on 27 August 1969 the 2–1 home win against Eintracht Frankfurt in the 87th minute and on 27 September 1969 in the 4–0 win in the away game against Eintracht Braunschweig, he contributed to the club emerging as runners-up in 17 games. He also played in the two first-round matches on 17 September and 1 October 1969 in the European Cup against French champions AS Saint-Étienne, in which Bayern lost 3–0 away after a 2–0 home win where Michl hit the crossbar.

=== Regionalliga and 2. Bundesliga ===
Despite his moderate success with Bayern, from 1970 to 1974, he played for 1. FC Nürnberg in the Regionalliga Süd and scored 20 goals in 79 games. Notably, he played against his former team of Bayern Munich in a 2–1 victory in the 1969–70 DFB-Pokal despite the club later losing in the semi-finals.

In the inaugural season of the 2. Bundesliga beginning in the second half of 1974, he played two seasons in the Süd Division from 1974 to 1976 for FK Pirmasens before transferring to FC Bayern Hof from 1976 to 1978 before finishing his career with 1. FC Saarbrücken from 1978 to 1980. During his career with FK Pirmasens, he failed in 1975 as runners-up in Group South in two promotion matches to the Bundesliga against Bayer 05 Uerdingen, the runners-up in Group North. He then left FC Bayern Hof after his second season due to its relegation to the Oberliga with similar misfortune during the 1977–78 season as the club was relegated from the Bundesliga. His final game was in a 5–2 defeat in the away game against Karlsruher SC on 24 May 1980 as part of the final matchday of the 1979–80 season, ending with 219 total appearances with 94 goals.

== Personal life and death ==
Michl was born on 30 May 1950 to parents that had owned a supermarket in Säbener Straße in Munich. Following his retirement from professional football, Michl settled in Maxvorstadt where he followed in his parents' footsteps in opening the Fruchthaus Michl in 1987, operating as both owner and chef. The supermarket has occasionally been visited by other Bayern Munich players with German television chef Martin Baudrexel visiting the supermarket in 2010.

Michl died on 17 March 2025, at the age of 74.
