= Jim Crossan =

Footballer and manager from Northern Ireland

James Crossan (c. 1941–2023) was a Northern Irish former football player and manager.

He played with Derry City in the Irish League and represented the club in both the European Cup Winners' Cup and European Cup competitions. He signed a professional contract with the club in 1964, and was a member of the Derry City team that won the 1963–64 Irish Cup. He subsequently played for Derry, against Steaua Bucharest, in the 1964–65 European Cup Winners' Cup. In the second leg of Derry City's 1965 European Cup preliminary round game against FK Lyn, Crossan scored a "wonder goal" from inside his own half to "[turn] the tie on its head" and precipitate a Derry City comeback.

Crossan was later the first manager of Derry City when the club began competing in the League of Ireland in 1985. His spell as manager, however, did not last a full season.

Crossan, who also played with the Northern Ireland national amateur football team, died in 2023. A memorial trophy, the Derry & District Jimbo Crossan Cup, was named after him. The trophy was presented to the 2026 competition winners by Crossan's brother, the former Northern Ireland international and Manchester City captain Jobby Crossan.
