= Gerhard Zebrowski =

German footballer (1940–2020)

Personal information
- Date of birth: 25 April 1940
- Place of birth: Bremen, Germany
- Date of death: 30 April 2020 (aged 80)
- Place of death: Bremen, Germany
- Height: 1.70 m (5 ft 7 in)
- Position: Winger

Youth career
- TuS Walle
- Werder Bremen

Senior career*
Years	Team	Apps	(Gls)
1959–1969	Werder Bremen	200	(63)
1969–1972	TuS Bremerhaven 93	91	(29)
1972–1973	SV Hemelingen		
- * Club domestic league appearances and goals

Gerhard Zebrowski (born 25 April 1940 – 30 April 2020) was a German footballer who played as a winger. He spent six seasons in the Bundesliga with SV Werder Bremen winning the league in the 1964–65 season and the DFB-Pokal in 1961.

== Career ==
=== Werder Bremen ===
Born in Bremen, Zebrowski grew up in the urban district of Walle where he played youth football with local team TuS Walle. He joined SV Werder Bremen at the age of 13 and made his debut in the Oberliga Nord, the German top tier at the time. Werder Bremen finished runners-up multiple times in the Oberliga with Zebrowski contributing 27 goals in 71 Oberliga matches.

He won the 1961 DFB-Pokal with Werder Bremen.

Two years after the Bundesliga was founded Zebrowski helped Werder Bremen win it, finishing the 1964–65 season as the club's second top scorer with 11 goals.

He played a total of 145 Bundesliga matches scoring 40 goals for Werder Bremen.

=== Later years with Bremerhaven 93 and SV Hemelingen ===
In 1969, Zebrowski moved to TuS Bremerhaven 93, a smaller club in the state of Bremen playing in the Regionalliga Nord, which was the German second tier at the time. He ended his career with Bremen-based amateur side SV Hemelingen.

== Post-playing career ==
Following his retirement he published the "Werder-Echo", Werder Bremen's matchday programme, together with Klaus Matischak, also a former player of the club. An honorary member of the club, Zebrowski regularly visited matches at the Weserstadion until his death.

== Death ==
He died on 30 April 2020, days after his 80th birthday.

== Style of play ==
Zebrowski played as a winger and was known for his pace and dribbling.

== Honours ==
Werder Bremen

- Bundesliga: 1964–65; runners-up 1968
- DFB-Pokal: 1961
