= Max Lorenz (footballer) =

German footballer (1939–2025)

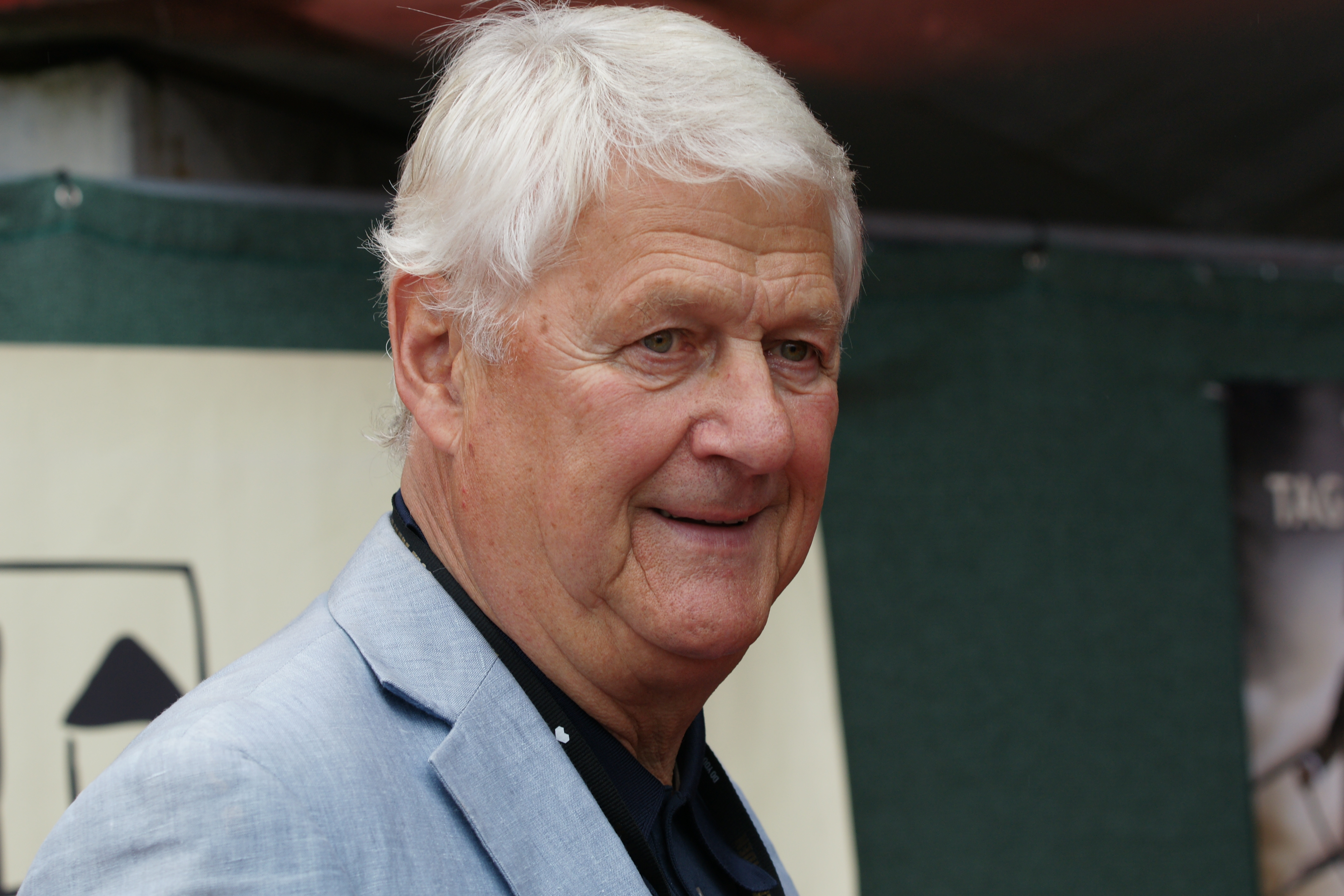
- Lorenz in 2014

Personal information
- Date of birth: 19 August 1939
- Place of birth: Bremen, Gau Weser-Ems, Germany
- Date of death: 24 October 2025 (aged 86)
- Place of death: Bremen, Germany
- Height: 1.86 m (6 ft 1 in)
- Position: Midfielder

Youth career
- SV Hemelingen

Senior career*
Years	Team	Apps	(Gls)
–1960	SV Hemelingen		
1960–1969	Werder Bremen	250	(26)
1969–1972	Eintracht Braunschweig	71	(2)
Total		321	(28)

International career
1965–1970	West Germany	19	(1)
Medal record
Men's football
Representing West Germany
FIFA World Cup
Runner-up	1966 England
Third place	1970 Mexico
- * Club domestic league appearances and goals

Max Lorenz (19 August 1939 – 24 October 2025) was a German footballer who played as a midfielder. He spent most of his career with Werder Bremen, making 250 league appearances in nine years at the club and winning the Bundesliga in the 1964–65 season. He spent three years at Eintracht Braunschweig. At international level, he made 19 appearances scoring one goal for the West Germany national team.

== Club career ==
Lorenz was born in Bremen. He played 250 West German top-flight matches.

== International career ==
Lorenz represented West Germany at the 1970 FIFA World Cup. He was also an unused squad member of the DFB team at the 1966 FIFA World Cup. Between 1965 and 1970, he won 19 caps for West Germany.

== Death ==
Lorenz died on 24 October 2025, at the age of 86.

== Honours ==
Werder Bremen

- Bundesliga: 1964–65
- DFB-Pokal: 1960–61
