= Leli Micallef =

Maltese footballer

Personal information
- Full name: Emanuel Micallef
- Date of birth: 21 August 1945 (age 81)
- Place of birth: Birkirkara, Crown Colony of Malta
- Position: Defender

Youth career
- 1961-1962: Birkirkara

Senior career*
Years	Team	Apps	(Gls)
1961–1962	Birkirkara	7	(2)
1962–1974	Sliema Wanderers	135	(21)
Total		142	(23)

International career
1970-1972	Malta	7	(0)

Managerial career
- 1978–1979: Marsa
- * Club domestic league appearances and goals

Emanuel "Leli" Micallef (born 21 August 1945) is a Maltese retired footballer.

== Club career ==
Born in Birkirkara, the tall Micallef started playing for local side Birkirkara aged 15 and made his debut for the senior side against Valletta in October 1961. He then joined Sliema Wanderers after that season and won 22 honours with the club over 16 years.

== International career ==
Micallef made his debut for Malta in an October 1970 European Championship qualification match against Greece and earned a total of 7 caps (no goals). His final international was an October 1972 World Cup qualification match away against Sweden.

== Honours ==
Sliema Wanderers

- Maltese Premier League: 5

1964, 1965, 1966, 1971, 1972

- FA Trophy: 5

1963, 1965, 1968, 1969, 1974

- Cassar Cup: 1

1966–67

- Scicluna Cup: 1

1965–66

- Independence Cup: 4

1964–65, 1969–70, 1971–72, 1973–74

- MFA League Cup: 2

1965–66, 1969–70

- Christmas Cup: 3

1966–67, 1967–68, 1970–71

- Testaferrata Cup: 1

1964–65

- Sons of Malta Cup: 1

1972–73
