= Bernd Schmidt =

German footballer (1943–2024)

Personal information
- Date of birth: 1 December 1943
- Place of birth: Alsfeld, Gau Hesse-Nassau, Germany
- Date of death: 11 June 2024 (aged 80)
- Height: 1.76 m (5 ft 9 in)
- Positions: Defender; midfielder

Senior career*
Years	Team	Apps	(Gls)
1965–1967	Hessen Kassel		
1967–1974	Werder Bremen	150	(11)
1974–1975	Hessen Kassel		
1975–1980	FSV Frankfurt	8	(0)
- * Club domestic league appearances and goals

Bernd Schmidt (1 December 1943 – 11 June 2024) was a German professional footballer who played as a defender or midfielder. He spent seven seasons in the Bundesliga with Werder Bremen. On 19 June 2024, Werder Bremen announced that Schmidt had died at the age of 80.

== Honours ==
Werder Bremen

- Bundesliga runner-up: 1967–68
