= Willy Reitgaßl =

German footballer

Personal information
- Date of birth: 29 February 1936
- Place of birth: Landshut, Germany
- Date of death: 23 August 1988 (aged 52)
- Place of death: near Darmstadt, West Germany
- Positions: Striker; midfielder

Senior career*
Years	Team	Apps	(Gls)
- SpVgg Landshut
–1958	VfB Coburg		
1958–1962	Karlsruher SC	59	(33)
1962–1967	1. FC Kaiserslautern	129	(32)
1967–1968	Sittardia Sittard	10	(0)

International career
1960	Germany	1	(1)
- * Club domestic league appearances and goals

Willy Reitgaßl (29 February 1936 in Landshut – 23 August 1988 near Darmstadt) was a German former football player. He spent five seasons in the Bundesliga with 1. FC Kaiserslautern. He represented Germany in a friendly against Iceland, scoring a goal in that game.

== Honours ==
- DFB-Pokal finalist: 1959–60
