= Sepp Piontek =

German football player and manager (1940–2026)

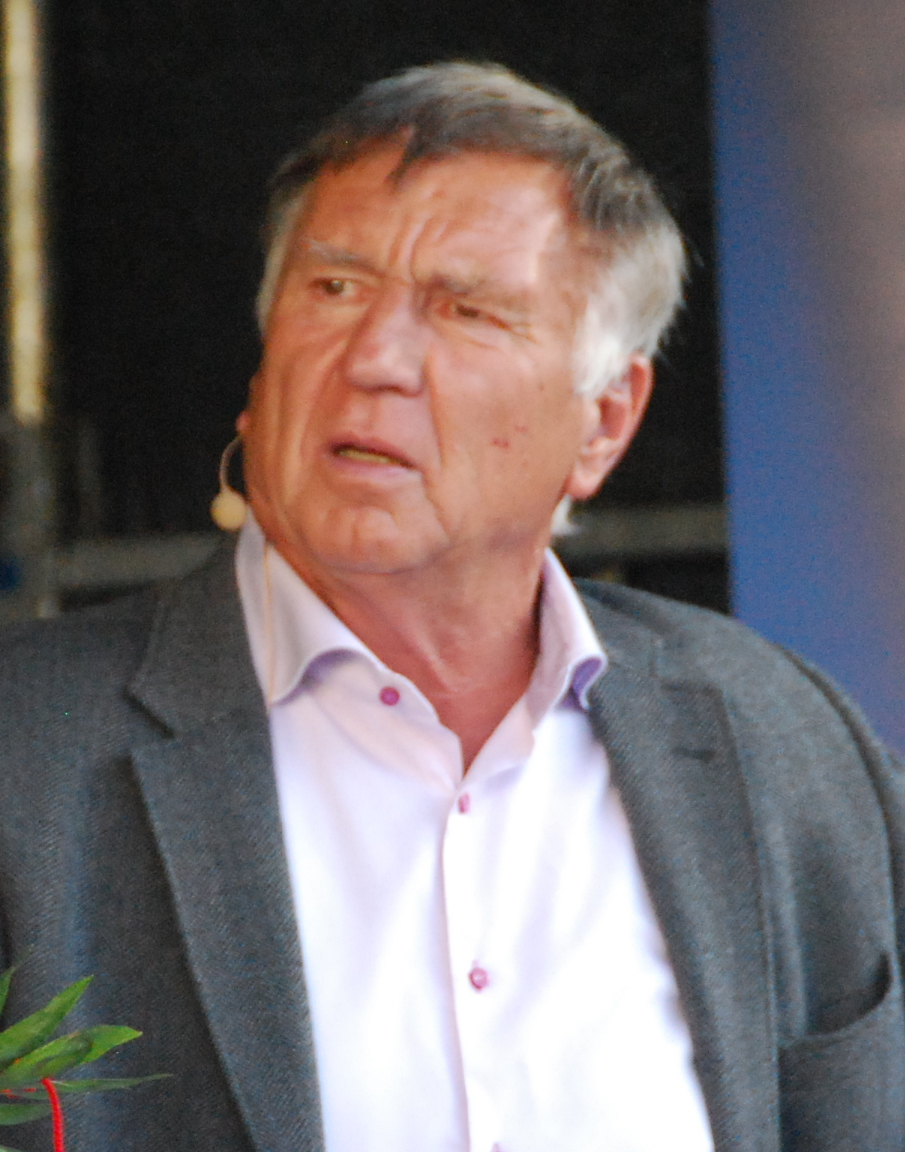
- Piontek in 2011

Personal information
- Full name: Josef Emanuel Hubertus Piontek
- Date of birth: 5 March 1940
- Place of birth: Breslau, Gau Silesia, Nazi Germany (now Wrocław, Poland)
- Date of death: 18 February 2026 (aged 85)
- Height: 1.81 m (5 ft 11 in)
- Position: Defender

Youth career
- 1949–1958: VfL Germania Leer

Senior career*
Years	Team	Apps	(Gls)
1958–1960	VfL Germania Leer		
1960–1972	Werder Bremen	278	(15)

International career
1961–1962	West Germany U23	2	(0)
1965–1966	West Germany	6	(0)

Managerial career
- 1971–1975: Werder Bremen
- 1975–1976: Fortuna Düsseldorf
- 1976–1978: Haiti
- 1978–1979: FC St. Pauli
- 1979–1990: Denmark
- 1990–1993: Turkey
- 1993–1995: Bursaspor
- 1995–1996: Aalborg BK
- 1997–1999: Silkeborg IF
- 2000–2002: Greenland
- 2004: Greenland
- * Club domestic league appearances and goals

Josef Emanuel Hubertus "Sepp" Piontek (5 March 1940 – 18 February 2026) was a German football player and manager. Most famous for his time as the head coach of the Denmark national team, he was included in the Danish Football Hall of Fame in 2011 as the first foreigner to be so.

== Playing career ==
Born in Breslau on 5 March 1940, Piontek started his playing career with VfL Germania Leer at the age of 9. Between 1963 and 1972, the full-back played 203 Bundesliga matches with 14 goals for Werder Bremen (he previously registered 75 matches and one goal with the side in Oberliga Nord (1960–1963), prior to the creation of Bundesliga). He started his career as forward, before transitioning to a defender. He gained six international caps (no goals) for the West Germany national team. Horst-Dieter Höttges was selected ahead of him for the 1966 World Cup.

== Coaching career ==
After retiring Piontek became the manager of his former club Werder Bremen. In 1975 he switched to Fortuna Düsseldorf, where he was the coach for a single season.

Piontek then became the manager for Haiti in 1976. With the team he narrowly missed qualification for the 1978 FIFA World Cup.

He then returned to Germany and joined FC St. Pauli in 1978, where he was for a single season in the second tier of German football. He guided the team to a 6th place, despite the club's financial trouble. During his tenure he was offered a position at the American team Philadelphia Fury, but chose to stay at St Pauli. He left St. Pauli after a single season, when the team lost its license and was relegated to the Oberliga.

=== Denmark ===
In 1979, Piontek became Denmark national team coach. During his tenure he sat through 115 international matches, winning 52 of them. His period as national team coach came just after the introduction of professional players in the national team, and under his reign the Denmark team became known as "Danish Dynamite". He is often heralded as being the person who introduced a professional attitude in Danish football, and has been called one of the most important people in Danish football. Among other initiatives he introduced mandatory sleeping and eating schedules on the Danish national team.

In the 1982 FIFA World Cup qualification, Denmark finished with four wins and four losses, including a 3–1 win against the eventual World Cup champions Italy, but Denmark failed to qualify for the final tournament.

Qualification for UEFA Euro 1984 saw Denmark defeat England at Wembley Stadium when Allan Simonsen converted a penalty kick for a 1–0 win. Denmark qualified for their first international tournament since 1964, and the team was dubbed "Danish Dynamite" in a competition for the official Danish Euro 1984 song. Denmark's participation ended in the semi-final when the team lost on penalties to Spain, most remembered for Preben Elkjær's penalty miss, his shorts torn apart. Following the strong performance at the finals, the name "Danish Dynamite" became a mainstay for the following decade of the Denmark national team.

Two years later, he led Denmark to their first ever World Cup participation in the 1986 tournament. With the attacking duo of Michael Laudrup and Preben Elkjær, thrashed Uruguay 6–1. In the second round, Denmark once again faced Spain and once more lost, 5–1, including four goals by Emilio Butragueño.

At the 1988 European Football Championship Denmark once again qualified, beating Wales and Finland and drawing both matches against Czechoslovakia. At the tournament Denmark would however go on to lose all three matches in the group stages.

He quit as Denmark coach in April 1990 after the Danish national team failed to qualify for 1990 FIFA World Cup. He did consider extenting his contract with the Danish FA, but accusations of tax dodging from the tabloid Ekstra Bladet made him change his mind. Although he had left the team, he is often credited with sowing the seeds that led to Denmark's win at the 1992 European Football Championship.

=== Turkey ===
Piontek later coached Turkey from an advice by fellow German and Piontek's teacher Jupp Derwall from May 1990 to 1993, in which though they failed to qualify for either UEFA Euro 1992 or the 1994 FIFA World Cup, helped sparking a massive revival in Turkish football fortunes which would be witnessed by the time Piontek left.

=== Later career ===
In 1995, Piontek returned to Denmark, where he coached Danish club Aalborg BK. Here he coached the team at the 1995-96 UEFA Champions League as the first Danish club ever. Initially, Aalborg lost the playoff to Ukrainian Dynamo Kiev, but due to a corruption scandal Aalborg qualified instead. In the Danish league he finished at a disappointing 5th place and was subsequently fired. He then joined league rivals Silkeborg IF. With Silkeborg he finished 2nd in the 1997–98 season. He retired from full time coaching in 1999 due to health concerns.

Afterwards, he worked with the Greenland national team from 1999 to 2001. Towards the end of his life he earned his living as a lecturer as well as coaching the Danish Old Boys national team.

== Personal life and death ==
Piontek was first married to Gerda. After settling in Denmark, he lived in Holte, in the Greater Copenhagen area, before moving in 1981 to Blommenslyst on the island of Funen. In 1988, he married his Danish wife Gitte, a teacher, with whom he lived in Blommenslyst. He had one daughter, Stephanie (born 1985).

Although fluent in Danish, Piontek retained noticeable linguistic influences from his native German, including a tendency to end sentences with the German tag question "ne?". In 1986, journalist Axel Weber observed that both his Danish and German speech carried Danish characteristics. On the occasion of his 80th birthday, Piontek described himself as "55 percent Danish and 45 percent German".

In October 2016, Danish journalist Christoffer Stig Christensen published the biography Sepp, which recounts Piontek’s life and career.

Piontek died on 18 February 2026, at the age of 85, following a short illness.

== Honours ==
=== Player ===
Werder Bremen

- Bundesliga: 1964–65; runner-up 1967–68
- DFB-Pokal: 1961

=== Manager ===
Individual

- Guerin Sportivo Manager of the Year: 1983
- Danish Football Manager of the Year: 1983
- World Soccer Men's Manager of the Year: 1983
- Order of Merit of the Federal Republic of Germany: 1986
- Danish Football Hall of Fame: 2011
