= Josef Marx =

German footballer

Personal information
- Full name: Josef Marx
- Date of birth: 20 November 1934
- Place of birth: Geseke, Germany
- Date of death: 24 August 2008 (aged 73)
- Position: Midfielder

Youth career
- VfL 09 Geseke

Senior career*
Years	Team	Apps	(Gls)
1956–1961	SV Sodingen		
1961–1969	Karlsruher SC	227	(22)

International career
1960	West Germany	1	(1)
- * Club domestic league appearances and goals

Josef Marx (20 November 1934 – 24 August 2008) was a German international footballer who played as a midfielder for SV Sodingen and Karlsruher SC.
