= Theo Klöckner =

German footballer

Personal information
- Full name: Theo Klöckner
- Date of birth: 19 October 1934 (age 92)
- Place of birth: Germany
- Height: 1.70 m (5 ft 7 in)
- Position: Winger

Youth career
- Mülheimer SV 07

Senior career*
Years	Team	Apps	(Gls)
1954–1956	VfB Speldorf		
1956–1963	Schwarz-Weiß Essen		
1963–1965	Werder Bremen	31	(8)
1968–1970	Schwarz-Weiß Essen		

International career
1958–1959	West Germany	2	(0)
- * Club domestic league appearances and goals

Theo Klöckner (born 19 October 1934) is a German former footballer who played as a winger for VfB Speldorf, Schwarz-Weiß Essen and Werder Bremen. He made two appearances for the West Germany national team.

He is a trained electrician. After his footballing career, he managed a gas station.

== Honours ==
Schwarz-Weiß Essen

- DFB-Pokal: 1959

Werder Bremen

- Bundesliga: 1964–65
