= Schnur =

Schnur (German and Jewish (Ashkenazic): metonymic occupational name for a maker of cords and rope from Middle High German snuor German Schnur) is a surname. Notable people with the surname include:

- Brayden Schnur (born 1995), Canadian tennis player
- Diego Hidalgo Schnur, Spanish philanthropist, intellectual and businessman
- Max Schnur (born 1993), American tennis player
- Meghan Schnur (born 1985) American soccer player
- Sandra Schnur (1935–1994), American disability rights leader
- Steve Schnur, President of Music for Electronic Arts (EA)
- Wolfgang Schnur (1944–2016), East German civil rights lawyer

See also

- Marie Schnür (1869–1918), German painter, illustrator and silhouette maker
