= Helmut Jagielski =

German footballer (1934–2002)

Personal information
- Date of birth: 13 March 1934
- Place of birth: Wattenscheid, Germany
- Date of death: 25 December 2002 (aged 68)
- Position: Defender

Youth career
- 1950–1952: Schalke 04

Senior career*
Years	Team	Apps	(Gls)
1952–1961	Schalke 04	156	(28)
1961–1967	Werder Bremen	117	(3)
Total		273	(31)
- * Club domestic league appearances and goals

Helmut Jagielski (13 March 1934 – 25 December 2002) was a German professional footballer who played as a defender for Schalke 04 and Werder Bremen. With Werder Bremen he won the Bundesliga in the 1964–65 season.

== Honours ==
Werder Bremen

- Bundesliga: 1964–65
- DFB-Pokal: 1960–61
