= Gerd Schneider =

German footballer

Personal information
- Date of birth: 18 December 1940
- Date of death: 29 October 1983 (aged 42)
- Height: 1.78 m (5 ft 10 in)
- Position: Defender

Senior career*
Years	Team	Apps	(Gls)
1961–1970	1. FC Kaiserslautern	219	(1)
- * Club domestic league appearances and goals as of 17:49, 3 March 2009 (UTC)

Gerd Schneider (18 December 1940 – 29 October 1983) was a German football player. He spent 7 seasons in the Bundesliga with 1. FC Kaiserslautern.

== Honours ==
- DFB-Pokal finalist: 1961.
