= Günter Bernard =

German footballer (born 1939)

Personal information
- Date of birth: 4 November 1939 (age 86)
- Place of birth: Schweinfurt, Germany
- Height: 1.79 m (5 ft 10 in)
- Position: Goalkeeper

Youth career
- 1. FC Schweinfurt 05

Senior career*
Years	Team	Apps	(Gls)
1958–1963	1. FC Schweinfurt 05	72	(0)
1963–1974	Werder Bremen	287	(0)
Total		359	(0)

International career
1962–1968	West Germany	5	(0)
Medal record
Men's football
Representing West Germany
FIFA World Cup
Runner-up	1966 England
- * Club domestic league appearances and goals

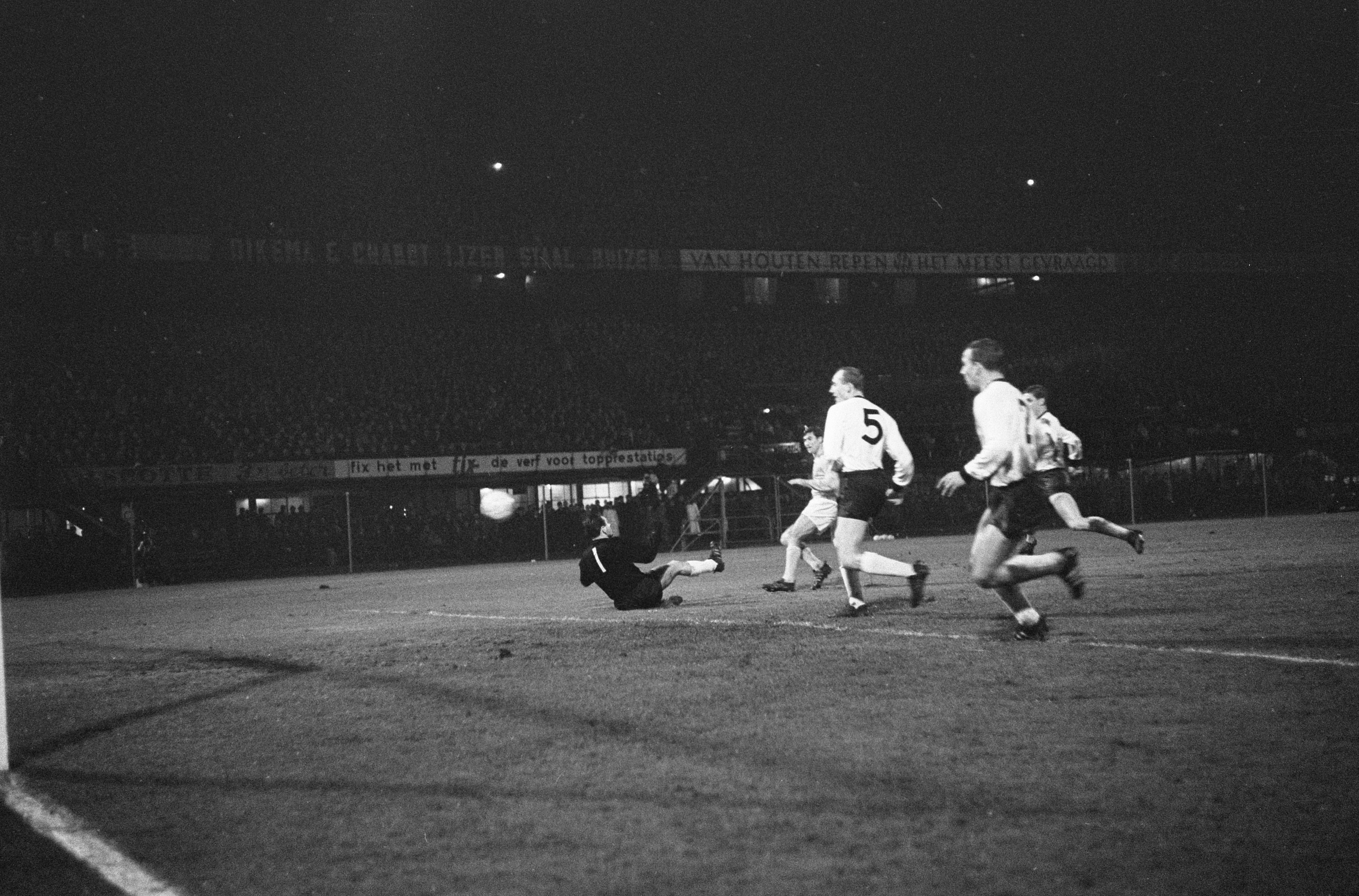
Bernard (left) with Germany in 1966

Günter Bernard (born 4 November 1939) is a German former professional footballer who played as a goalkeeper. He is the son of Robert Bernard who was a German international football player himself.

== Club career ==
Bernard was born in Schweinfurt, Germany. He joined SV Werder Bremen in the founding year of Bundesliga from boyhood outfit Schweinfurt 05, for whom he had played top-tier matches in the Oberliga Süd since 1958. He stayed loyal to Bremen until his retirement in 1974 and was the club's first choice in their surprise Bundesliga winning campaign in 1965. He altogether played 287 times on that level for the North Germans.

== International career ==
His West Germany career started with a youth call-up in 1961 that prompted Sepp Herberger to take him to the senior level a year later. Competing with Wolfgang Fahrian and Hans Tilkowski for the job in goal of West Germany at that time, Bernard made his first West Germany appearance under contract with 1. FC Schweinfurt 05 on 24 October 1962. The Bundesliga trophy he won with Werder Bremen, three years later, helped him to achieve a spot in Helmut Schön's squad for the 1966 FIFA World Cup, but did not give him the competitive edge he had been longing for. So Hans Tilkowski was the West German keeper at the tournament. Bernard made his fifth and final game for West Germany as a substitute for Horst Wolter against Wales in 1968.

== Honours ==
Werder Bremen

- Bundesliga: 1964–65, runner-up 1967–68

Germany

- FIFA World Cup: runner-up 1966
