= Willi Soya =

German footballer (1935–1990)

Personal information
- Full name: Wilhelm Soya
- Date of birth: 11 October 1935
- Place of birth: Germany
- Date of death: 4 July 1990 (aged 54)
- Height: 1.77 m (5 ft 10 in)
- Position: Midfielder

Senior career*
Years	Team	Apps	(Gls)
1954–1961	Schalke 04	71	(34)
1961–1966	Werder Bremen	90	(43)
1966–1967	ASV Bergedorf		
- * Club domestic league appearances and goals

Wilhelm Soya (born 11 November 1935 – 4 July 1990), commonly known as Willi Soya, was a German professional footballer who played as a midfielder. He spent almost his entire career in the first-tier: in the Oberliga West with Schalke 04, in the Oberliga Nord for Werder Bremen, and in the Bundesliga for Werder Bremen after the league's establishment in 1963. He became German national champion with Schalke in 1958 and with Werder Bremen in 1964–65. After his second title, he left Werder Bremen and spent his final year of professional football with ASV Bergedorf 85 in the second-tier Regionalliga Nord.

== Honours ==
Schalke 04

- German championship: 1958

Werder Bremen

- DFB-Pokal: 1960–61
- Bundesliga: 1964–65
