= Ellenfeldstadion =

Football stadium in Neunkirchen, Saarland, Germany

Coordinates: 49°20′12″N 7°10′47″E

- Ellenfeldstadion
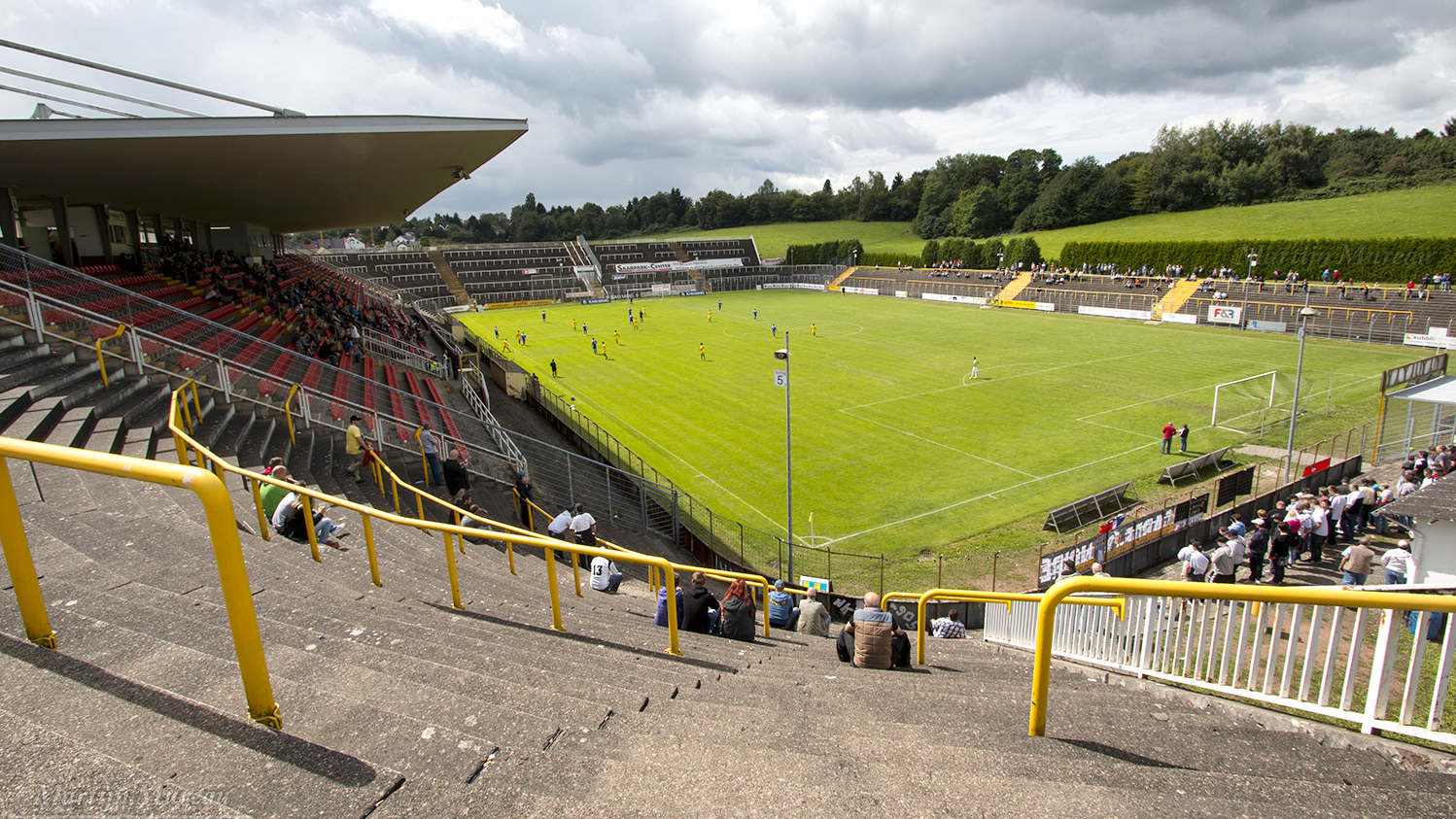
- Interactive map of Ellenfeldstadion
- Full name: Ellenfeldstadion
- Former names: Borussia-Sportplatz
- Location: Mantes-la-Ville-Platz 12; 66538 Neunkirchen, Saarland, Germany
- Owner: Stadt Neunkirchen
- Operator: Stadt Neunkirchen
- Capacity: 23,400
- Executive suites: None
- Record attendance: 31,000 (Borussia Neunkirchen-1. FC Nürnberg, 26 May 1971)
- Field size: 105 × 68 m

Construction
- Built: 1911-1912
- Opened: July 14, 1912
- Renovated: 1964, 2002
- Cost: 23.200 DM (1911, Borussia-Sportplatz); 1.8 mio DM (1964, Ellenfeldstadion)
- Architects: 1911-1912: Albrecht Menzel; 1952-1962: Felix Schaan

Tenants
- Borussia Neunkirchen (1912–present); Saarland Hurricanes (selected matches)

The Ellenfeldstadion is a grass surface, multi-purpose stadium in Neunkirchen, Saarland, Germany. It was built in 1911 and 1912, completely reconstructed between 1962 and 1964 and partially renovated in 2002. It is currently used mostly for football matches and is the home of Borussia Neunkirchen. The stadium is also used by the American football team Saarland Hurricanes from Saarbrücken. The stadium has a capacity of 23,400 spectators.

== History ==
=== Construction of Borussia-Sportplatz ===
Borussia Neunkirchen obtained the grounds of Ellenfeld on a leasehold basis from the brewery Neunkircher Schloss-Brauerei. In the leasehold the first right of acquisition was also granted to the club. Construction of the Borussia-Sportplatz began in October 1911 and was finished in July 1912. Total construction costs were around 23,200 DM. However, the openingsmatch was on 7 April 1912, when Borussia Neunkirchen played the football squad of the 6. Königlich-Sächsischen Infanterieregiments Nr. 105 from Strasbourg. Borussia Neunkirchen won this match with 6–3.

=== Early expansion ===
Due to the club's successes, the stadium's capacity became too limited. When MTK Budapest played a friendly match at the Borussia-Sportplatz, the stadium could not accommodate all the spectators. Plans for expansion were made and in 1921 a new wooden stand was built, which was operated by a third party. Other stands were also expanded, which increased the stadium's capacity to 12,000 spectators. In 1928 a fire demolished the wooden stand and Borussia Neunkirchen decided to build a concrete stand in its place. The construction costs exceeded the budget, which led to financial troubles at the club. A local company took over the debts.

=== Plans for the Ellenfeldstadion ===
In 1948 Borussia Neunkirchen purchased the grounds of Ellenfeld and presented plans for a new Ellenfeldstadion. In 1952 the club and architect Felix Schaan present new plans to build a stadium, that can hold up to 25,000 to 30,000 spectators. However, at the same time the Ludwigsparkstadion in Saarbrücken is built and Saarland's government is politically and financially engaged in the construction of the Ludwigsparkstadion. Borussia Neunkirchen is forced to set aside the plans for their new stadium. The club and architect prepare new plans for a multi-purpose stadium and in 1960 a sports hall is opened. Saarland agrees to financially contribute to the building of a new Ellenfeldstadion, which can hold up to 30,000 spectators. The estimated construction costs are 1.8 million DM, to which Saarland contributes 50%. During the construction of the stadium, Borussia Neunkirchen promotes to the 1. Bundesliga and the opening match against Borussia Dortmund attracts 25,000 spectators. An average of 18,755 spectators visits the matches at the Ellenfeldstadion.

=== Stadium's decline ===
Three years after their promotion, Borussia Neunkirchen was relegated to the 2nd tier of German football. The club plays in the top-level of the 2nd tier, but never achieves promotion. In 1971 a record attendance of 31,000 spectators visits the match Borussia Neunkirchen vs 1. FC Nürnberg. In the 1980s, several big companies in Neunkirchen face bankruptcy, which cause a decline in sponsorship fees. Borussia Neunkirchen also relegates towards the amateurs and faces bankruptcy in 1990. In 1990, Neunkirchen's city council decides to purchase the stadium from Borussia Neunkirchen and the club is saved from bankruptcy. The stadium's maintenance is limited, though a small renovation in 2002 is carried out at the costs of 500,000 euro. In 2003 Borussia Neunkirchen draws Bayern München for the DFB-Pokal and 23,400 spectators visit the match in the Ellenfeldstadion. In 2007 the derby against 1. FC Saarbrücken attracts 10,000 spectators. In 2011 and 2012 several plans are made for a complete reconstruction of the Ellenfeldstadion, but were never carried out. Since a few years, due to safety regulations, several stands are closed down for the public.
