= Klaus Hänel =

German footballer (1936–2016)

Personal information
- Date of birth: 23 February 1936
- Place of birth: Hartha, Germany
- Date of death: 15 June 2016 (aged 80)
- Height: 1.75 m (5 ft 9 in)
- Positions: Winger; midfielder

Youth career
- BTS Neustadt
- 1954–1956: Werder Bremen

Senior career*
Years	Team	Apps	(Gls)
1954–1956	Werder Bremen II		
1956–1968	Werder Bremen	215	(80)

International career
1958	Germany U23		

Managerial career
- 1968–1970: Union 60 Bremen
- 1970–1974: SV Grohn
- * Club domestic league appearances and goals

Klaus Hänel (23 February 1936 – 15 June 2016) was a German footballer who played as a winger or midfielder for Werder Bremen where he won the Bundesliga in the 1964–65 season. He made his last Bundesliga appearance on 13 January 1968 against Eintracht Frankfurt.

His father Erich Hänel was also a professional footballer who was selected three times for Germany in 1939.

== Honours ==
Werder Bremen

- Bundesliga: 1964–65
- DFB-Pokal: 1960–61
