= Helmut Schimeczek =

German footballer

Personal information
- Date of birth: 4 July 1938 (age 88)
- Place of birth: Berlin, Germany
- Height: 1.70 m (5 ft 7 in)
- Position: Midfielder

Senior career*
Years	Team	Apps	(Gls)
1957–1958	VfB Fallersleben		
1958–1970	Werder Bremen	213	(33)
- * Club domestic league appearances and goals

Helmut Schimeczek (born 4 April 1938) is a German former footballer who played as a midfielder for Werder Bremen. With Werder Bremen he won the Bundesliga in the 1964–65 season.

== Honours ==
Werder Bremen

- Bundesliga: 1964–65
