= Heinz Steinmann =

German footballer (1938–2023)

Personal information
- Date of birth: 1 February 1938
- Place of birth: Essen, Gau Essen, Germany
- Date of death: 18 March 2023 (aged 85)
- Place of death: Achim, Lower Saxony, Germany
- Height: 1.78 m (5 ft 10 in)
- Position: Defender

Senior career*
Years	Team	Apps	(Gls)
1956–1963	Schwarz-Weiß Essen	110	(2)
1963–1964	1. FC Saarbrücken	30	(1)
1964–1970	Werder Bremen	184	(4)
Total		324	(7)

International career
1962–1965	West Germany	3	(1)
- * Club domestic league appearances and goals

Heinz Steinmann (1 February 1938 – 18 March 2023) was a German footballer who played as a defender. He spent eight seasons in the Bundesliga with 1. FC Saarbrücken and Werder Bremen, winning the Bundesliga in the 1964–65 season with Werder Bremen. He also represented West Germany three times, all in friendlies. He scored an equaliser in a 2–2 draw against France in 1962.

== Death ==
Steinmann died in March 2023, at the age of 85.

== Honours ==
Schwarz-Weiß Essen

- DFB-Pokal: 1958–59

Werder Bremen

- Bundesliga: 1964–65; runner-up 1967–68
