= Wolfgang Schnarr =

German footballer (1941–2025)

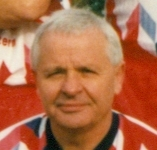
- Schnarr in 1995

Personal information
- Date of birth: 9 June 1941
- Place of birth: Miesau, Gau Westmark, Germany
- Date of death: 27 March 2025 (aged 83)
- Place of death: Kaiserslautern, Rhineland-Palatinate, Germany
- Height: 1.75 m (5 ft 9 in)
- Position: Goalkeeper

Senior career*
Years	Team	Apps	(Gls)
1960–1970	1. FC Kaiserslautern	182	(0)
1970–1972	Preußen Münster		
1972–1974	ASV Landau		
- * Club domestic league appearances and goals

Wolfgang Schnarr (9 June 1941 – 27 March 2025) was a German footballer who played as a goalkeeper, spending seven seasons in the Bundesliga with 1. FC Kaiserslautern. He died on 27 March 2025, at the age of 83.

== Honours ==
1. FC Kaiserslautern

- DFB-Pokal finalist: 1961

== Literature ==
- Skrentny, Werner, ed. (1996). Teufelsangst vorm Erbsenberg: die Geschichte der Oberliga Südwest 1946 - 1963 (1. Aufl ed.). Essen: Klartext. ISBN 978-3-88474-394-2.
- Grüne, Hardy (1998). 35 Jahre Bundesliga. 1: Die Gründerjahre 1963 - 1975. Enzyklopädie des deutschen Ligafußballs / Hardy Grüne. Kassel: Agon-Sportverlag. ISBN 978-3-89784-132-1.
