= Diethelm Ferner =

German football player and manager (1941–2023)

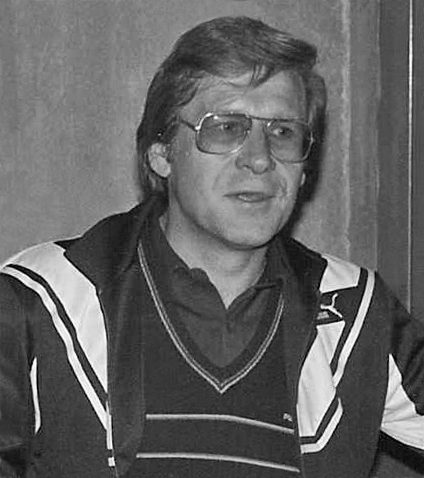
- Ferner in 1985

Personal information
- Date of birth: 13 July 1941
- Place of birth: Kragau, Germany
- Date of death: 7 November 2023 (aged 82)
- Height: 1.68 m (5 ft 6 in)
- Position: Midfielder

Senior career*
Years	Team	Apps	(Gls)
1962–1963	VfB Bottrop		
1963–1969	Werder Bremen	181	(20)
1969–1974	Rot-Weiss Essen	51	(1)

International career
1963–1964	West Germany	2	(0)

Managerial career
- 1973–1975: Rot-Weiss Essen
- 1975–1976: Wuppertaler SV
- 1976–1978: FC St. Pauli
- 1978–1979: Rot-Weiss Essen
- 1979–1982: Hannover 96
- 1983–1986: Schalke 04
- 1986–1987: Iraklis
- 1987: Alemannia Aachen
- 1988–1989: Schalke 04
- 1990–1994: Apollon Limassol
- 1995–1996: AEL Limassol
- 1996–1997: Zamalek
- 1997–1998: Al-Jahra
- 1998: Lebanon
- 1999–2000: Apollon Limassol
- 2000–2002: El-Ittihad El-Iskandary
- 2003–2004: Al-Merreikh Al-Thagher
- 2005–2006: Olympiakos Nicosia
- 2008: Al Ahli Tripoli
- 2013: Kavala
- * Club domestic league appearances and goals

Diethelm Ferner (13 July 1941 – 7 November 2023) was a German football coach and player. As a player, he spent eight seasons in the Bundesliga with Werder Bremen and Rot-Weiss Essen, winning the 1964–65 Bundesliga with Werder Bremen. He represented West Germany in two friendlies.

== Coaching career ==
As a coach Ferner helped FC St. Pauli to its first promotion to the Bundesliga.

== Death ==
Ferner died on 7 November 2023, at the age of 82.

== Honours ==
=== Player ===
Werder Bremen

- Bundesliga: 1964–65

=== Coach ===
Apollon Limassol

- Cypriot First Division: 1990–91, 1993–94

Zamalek

- CAF Champions League: 1996
