= Horst-Dieter Höttges =

German footballer (1943–2023)

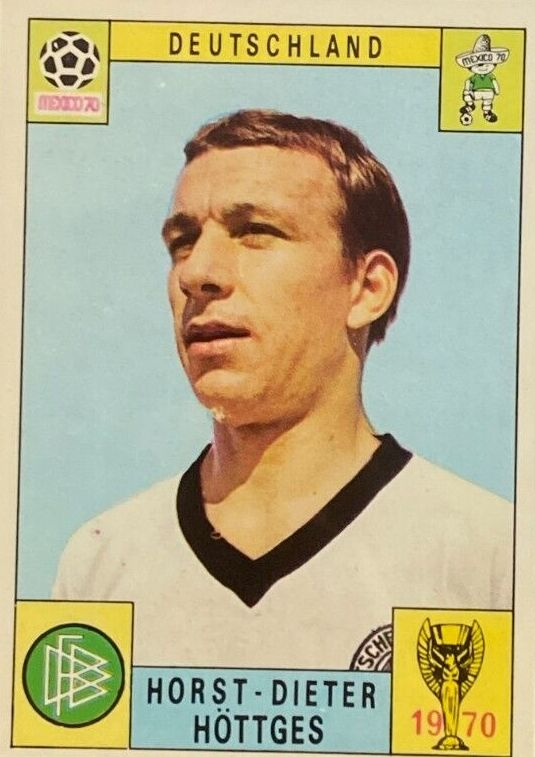
- Höttges at the 1970 FIFA World Cup

Personal information
- Full name: Horst-Dieter Höttges
- Date of birth: 10 September 1943
- Place of birth: Mönchengladbach, Germany
- Date of death: 22 June 2023 (aged 79)
- Place of death: Bremen, Germany
- Height: 1.76 m (5 ft 9 in)
- Positions: Sweeper; full-back

Youth career
- Blau-Weiß Dahl
- Rheydter SV
- –1960: Borussia Mönchengladbach

Senior career*
Years	Team	Apps	(Gls)
1960–1964	Borussia Mönchengladbach	30	(0)
1964–1978	Werder Bremen	420	(55)
1979–1980	Werder Bremen amateurs	14	(2)
- SC Oberbecksen

International career
1963–1964	West Germany U23	3	(0)
1965–1974	West Germany B	2	(0)
1965–1974	West Germany	66	(1)
Medal record
Men's football
Representing West Germany
FIFA World Cup
Winner	1974 West Germany
Runner-up	1966 England
Third place	1970 Mexico
- * Club domestic league appearances and goals

Horst-Dieter Höttges (10 September 1943 – 22 June 2023) was a German professional footballer who played as a sweeper or right-back. Having started his career with hometown club Borussia Mönchengladbach, he spent most of his career with Werder Bremen. He made 420 Bundesliga appearances for Werder Bremen, a club record for outfield players, scoring 55 goals and helped the club win the Bundesliga title in the 1964–65 season, his first at Werder Bremen. At international level, he represented West Germany from 1965 to 1974, amassing 66 caps and scoring 1 goal. He was part of the West Germany squads that won the 1974 FIFA World Cup and the UEFA Euro 1972.

== Club career ==
=== Borussia Mönchengladbach ===
Born in Mönchengladbach, Höttges began playing football at local sides Blau-Weiß Dahl and Rheydter SV before joining Borussia Mönchengladbach at the age of 17. After three years in the youth of Mönchengladbach he was taking part for them in their Regionalliga West campaign of 1963–64 with Mönchengladbach manager Hennes Weisweiler feeling Höttges' way of playing was not what he was looking for and the defender was forced to move on.

=== Werder Bremen ===
Ahead of the 1964–65 season Höttges signed with Bundesliga team Werder Bremen and enjoyed immediate success under Willi Multhaup at the Weser-Stadion, ending up winner of the Bundesliga title with Werder at the end of the same season.

This outstanding success with Werder Bremen was a key for the full-back to be called up by Helmut Schön for the West Germany national team already in 1965, a time when his toughness in tackling duels earned him his "Eisenfuß" (iron foot) nickname. Although Werder Bremen could not recopy the success of 1965, and became rather a relegation battler than a title chaser, Höttges remained loyal to them and served in the Bundesliga until 1978, scoring 55 goals in his 420 appearances for the North German side. As of July 2023, he holds the club record number of Bundesliga appearances for outfield players. His commitment to a half-a-day employment as sales representative for a manufacturer of sports goods forced him to hang up his boots that summer. Höttges put job before club, unwilling to give up his business, and got named "Ehrenspielführer" (honorary captain) due to his career efforts by Werder Bremen.

== International career ==
On 13 March 1965, Horst-Dieter Höttges debuted for West Germany in a friendly against Italy (1–1) at Hamburg's Volksparkstadion. Hamburg's Volksparkstadion was also the place where he won the last of his sixty-six caps for West Germany during the memorable first round defeat at the hands of East Germany in the 1974 FIFA World Cup. The defeat of the West Germans in the politically and emotionally exaggerated match led coach Helmut Schön to significant changes in his line-up and limiting Höttges to a bench role was one of those. It resulted in the defender's subsequent retirement from international football after the 1974 FIFA World Cup final West Germany won against their Dutch opponents. His first of altogether three World Cup participations Höttges enjoyed in 1966 as part of the runner-up squad of West Germany in England. He was further a member of the squad for the 1970 FIFA World Cup (third-place finish) and was a starter for his country in the UEFA Euro 1972 final against in Brussels on 18 June. He and his teammates beat the Soviet Union that day to win Germany's first UEFA European Football Championship trophy.

== Later years and death ==
Later on Höttges showed up for some time on amateur level for Bad Oeynhausen's SC Oberbecksen and TSV Achim, a club in a village near Bremen, where he settled down. He was partly coaching that club in an honorary capacity in the 1990s.

Höttges died from complications of dementia on 22 June 2023, at the age of 79.

== Career statistics ==
=== Club ===
Appearances and goals by club, season and competition
Club	Season	League			DFB-Pokal		Europe		Other		Total	
Club	Season	Division	Apps	Goals	Apps	Goals	Apps	Goals	Apps	Goals	Apps	Goals
Borussia Mönchengladbach	1963–64	Regionalliga West	30	0	1	0	–		–		31	0
Werder Bremen	1964–65	Bundesliga	29	1	0	0	–		–		29	1
Werder Bremen	1965–66	Bundesliga	31	5	3	0	4	2	–		38	7
Werder Bremen	1966–67	Bundesliga	30	3	4	2	–		–		36	11
Werder Bremen	1967–68	Bundesliga	33	9	0	0	–		–		33	9
Werder Bremen	1968–69	Bundesliga	31	6	2	0	–		–		33	6
Werder Bremen	1969–70	Bundesliga	31	3	3	0	–		–		34	3
Werder Bremen	1970–71	Bundesliga	22	1	1	0	–		–		22	1
Werder Bremen	1971–72	Bundesliga	28	3	8	1	–		–		36	4
Werder Bremen	1972–73	Bundesliga	29	3	7	2	–		4 (Note: Appearances in DFB-Ligapokal)	0	40	5
Werder Bremen	1973–74	Bundesliga	31	6	4	2	–		–		35	8
Werder Bremen	1974–75	Bundesliga	31	6	4	0	–		–		35	6
Werder Bremen	1975–76	Bundesliga	30	4	1	0	–		–		31	4
Werder Bremen	1976–77	Bundesliga	32	2	3	0	–		–		35	2
Werder Bremen	1977–78	Bundesliga	32	3	4	4	–		–		36	7
Werder Bremen	Total		420	55	44	11	4	2	4	0	472	68
Werder Bremen amateurs	1979–80	Amateur Oberliga Nord	14	2	–		–		–		14	2
Career total			464	57	45	11	4	2	4	0	517	70

=== International ===
Appearances and goals by national team and year
National team	Year	Apps	Goals
West Germany	1965	8	0
West Germany	1966	12	0
West Germany	1967	6	0
West Germany	1968	5	0
West Germany	1969	6	1
West Germany	1970	10	0
West Germany	1971	1	0
West Germany	1972	7	0
West Germany	1973	8	0
West Germany	1974	3	0
Total		66	1

== Honours ==
Werder Bremen

- Bundesliga: 1964–65 season

West Germany

- FIFA World Cup: 1974
- UEFA European Championship: 1972

Individual

- kicker Bundesliga Team of the Season: 1964-65, 1966–67, 1969-70
