= Willi Multhaup =

German football manager (1903–1982)

Personal information
- Date of birth: 19 July 1903
- Place of birth: Essen, German Empire
- Date of death: 18 December 1982 (aged 79)
- Place of death: Essen, West Germany
- Position: Left midfielder

Senior career*
Years	Team	Apps	(Gls)
1924–1925	Schwarz-Weiß Essen		

Managerial career
- 1949–1950: Preußen Münster
- 1950–1951: MSV Duisburg
- 1951–1953: Preußen Münster
- 1953–1954: STV Horst-Emscher
- 1954–1957: VfB Bottrop
- 1957–1959: Schwarz-Weiß Essen
- 1959–1961: Rot-Weiss Essen
- 1961–1963: MSV Duisburg
- 1963–1965: Werder Bremen
- 1965–1966: Borussia Dortmund
- 1966–1968: 1. FC Köln
- 1971: Werder Bremen
- * Club domestic league appearances and goals

Willi Multhaup (19 July 1903 – 18 December 1982) was a German football manager and player who led Borussia Dortmund to victory in the UEFA Cup Winners' Cup in 1966.

== Career ==
Multhaup won the 1964–65 Bundesliga with Werder Bremen. He won the European Cup Winners' Cup with Borussia Dortmund the following year. Shortly after he won the 1967–68 DFB-Pokal with 1. FC Köln.

== Personal life and death ==
Multhaup's son, Hennes, is a sports journalist who works for Axel Springer SE.

Multhaup died on 18 December 1982 in his hometown Essen, at the age of 79.

== Honours ==
Werder Bremen

- Bundesliga: 1964–65

Borussia Dortmund

- UEFA Cup Winners' Cup: 1966

1. FC Köln

- DFB-Pokal: 1967–68
