= Klaus Matischak =

German footballer (1938–2026)

Personal information
- Date of birth: 24 October 1938
- Place of birth: Bottrop, Gau Westphalia-North, Germany
- Date of death: 24 October 2026 (aged 88)
- Height: 1.74 m (5 ft 9 in)
- Position: Centre-forward

Senior career*
Years	Team	Apps	(Gls)
1955–1958	VfB Bottrop		
1958–1960	Karlsruher SC		
1960–1962	FK Pirmasens		
1962–1963	Viktoria Köln	25	(17)
1963–1964	Schalke 04	22	(18)
1964–1967	Werder Bremen	42	(20)
- * Club domestic league appearances and goals

Klaus Matischak (24 October 1938 – 24 October 2026) was a German footballer who played as a centre-forward. He scored 38 goals in 64 matches in the Bundesliga.

In 1965, he won the Bundesliga title with Werder Bremen.

Matischak died on 24 October 2026, at the age of 88.

== Honours ==
Werder Bremen

- Bundesliga: 1964–65
