= Glückauf-Kampfbahn =

Football stadium in Gelsenkirchen, Germany

Coordinates: 51°31′48″N 7°4′46″E

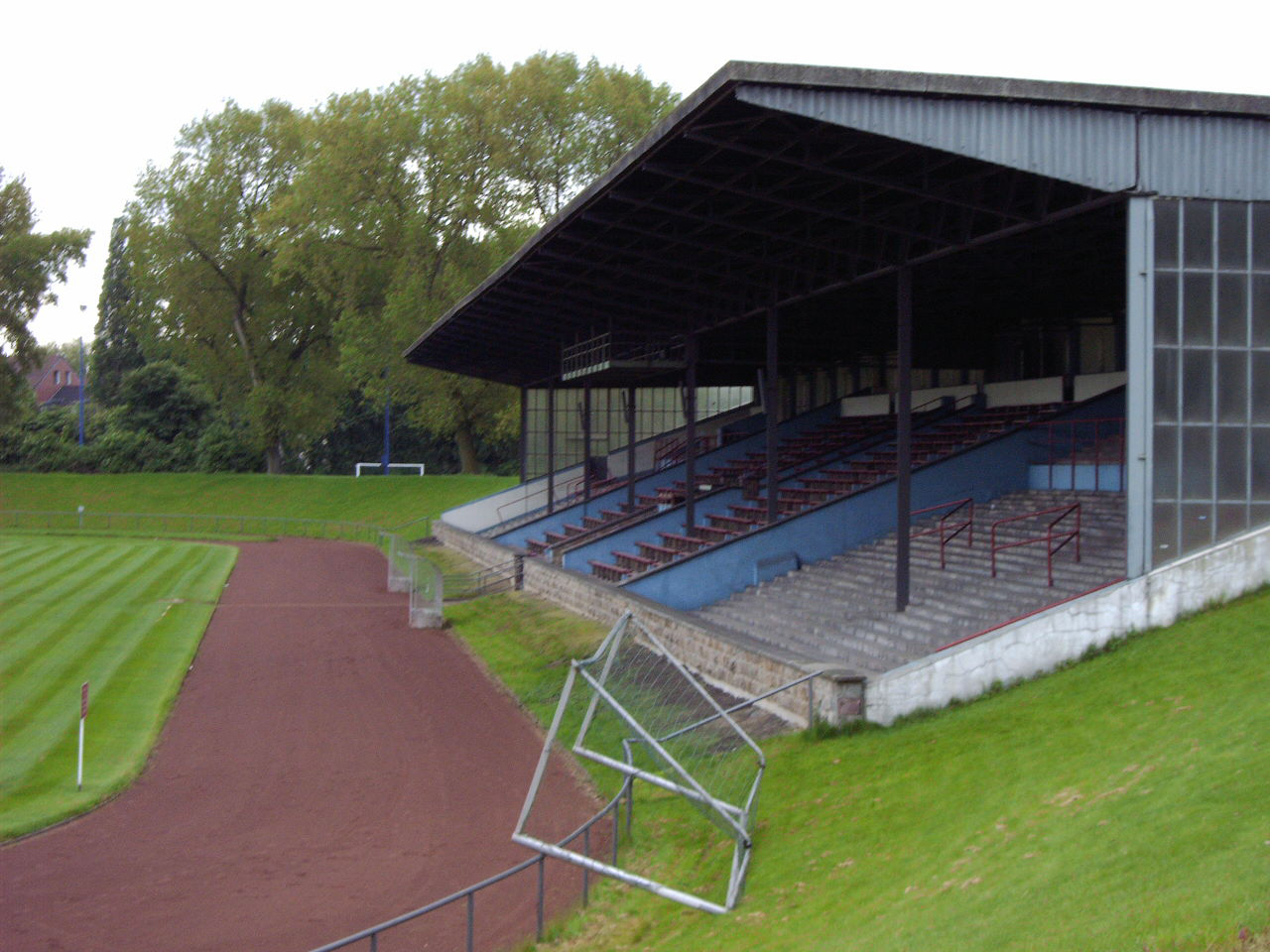
- Interactive map of Glückauf-Kampfbahn
- Full name: Glückauf-Kampfbahn
- Location: Gelsenkirchen, Germany
- Owner: City of Gelsenkirchen
- Operator: DJK Teutonia Schalke-Nord
- Capacity: 35,000 (original); 11,000 (current)
- Surface: Artificial turf

Construction
- Opened: 25 August 1928
- Renovated: 1946, 1989

Tenant
- FC Schalke 04 (1928–1973)

Glückauf-Kampfbahn is a multi-use stadium in Gelsenkirchen, North Rhine-Westphalia, Germany.

== History ==
Glückauf-Kampfbahn was initially used as the stadium of FC Schalke 04 matches since the 1920s until it was replaced by Parkstadion in 1973. The capacity of the stadium is 11,000 spectators, though it was originally designed to host around 35,000 spectators. However, 70,000 people crowded into the stadium in a 1–0 friendly match against Fortuna Düsseldorf in 1931. The stadium became the home venue for the Schalke 04 women's team since their reestablishment in 2020.
