= Arnold Schütz =

German footballer

Personal information
- Date of birth: 19 January 1935
- Place of birth: Bremen, Germany
- Date of death: 14 April 2015 (aged 80)
- Height: 1.78 m (5 ft 10 in)
- Positions: Midfielder; defender

Youth career
- TuS Walle

Senior career*
Years	Team	Apps	(Gls)
1955–1972	Werder Bremen	333	(107)
- * Club domestic league appearances and goals

Arnold 'Pico' Schütz (19 January 1935 – 14 April 2015) was a German footballer who played as a midfielder or defender. He spent nine seasons in the Bundesliga (253 appearances, 69 goals) with Werder Bremen, winning the championship in the 1964–65 season, having already played for the club for eight years in the Oberliga Nord under the previous regionalised system.

== Honours ==
Werder Bremen

- Bundesliga: 1964–65; runner-up 1967–68
- DFB-Pokal: 1960–61

== See also ==
- List of one-club men in association football
