= 1993–94 DFB-Pokal =

Tournament details
- Country: Germany
- Teams: 76

Final positions
- Champions: Werder Bremen
- Runners-up: Rot-Weiß Essen

Tournament statistics
- Matches played: 75
- Top goal scorer: Wynton Rufer (5)

The 1993–94 DFB-Pokal was the 51st season of the annual German football cup competition. 76 teams competed in the tournament of seven rounds which began on 1 August 1993 and ended on 14 May 1994. In the final Werder Bremen defeated Rot-Weiß Essen 3–1 thereby claiming their third title.

== Matches ==
Times up to 25 September 1993 and from 27 March 1994 are CEST (UTC+2). Times from 26 September 1993 to 26 March 1994 are CET (UTC+1).

=== First round ===
| 2 August 1993 | Werder Bremen (A) | 1–5 | Bayern Munich | Bremen |
| 20:15 | Simonsen 59' | Report (in German) | Labbadia 33', 63', 64'; Valencia 62'; Matthäus 81' | Stadium: Weserstadion, Platz 11; Attendance: 8,500; Referee: Norbert Haupt (Berlin) |

| 3 August 1993 | SV Sandhausen | 1–4 | Karlsruher SC | Sandhausen |
| 19:00 | Berecko 63' | Report (in German) | Bender 60', 83'; Kiriakov 62', 88' | Stadium: Hartwaldstadion; Attendance: 10,000; Referee: Helmut Fleischer (Ulm) |

| 3 August 1993 | SpVgg Plattling | 4–3 | FSV Mainz 05 | Plattling |
| 19:00 | Boxleitner 2', 5', 83'; Weigl 13' | Report (in German) | Glesius 28', 66'; Klopp 62' | Attendance: 1,600; Referee: Lange (Lich) |

| 3 August 1993 | FC Kilia Kiel | 0–8 | SC Freiburg | Kiel |
| 19:00 | | Report (in German) | Freund 30', 40'; Braun 65', 88'; Simon 71', 81'; Todt 80'; Spies 90' | Stadium: Stadion am Hauptplatz; Attendance: 2,500; Referee: Hans-Jürgen Kasper (Katlenburg) |

| 3 August 1993 | SV Ludweiler | 1–4 | Borussia Dortmund |
| 18:30 | Tabellion 63' | Report (in German) | Reinhardt 24'; Mill 30'; Reuter 33'; Rummenigge 84' | Attendance: 10,500; Referee: Thomas Leimert (Ludwigshafen) |

| 3 August 1993 | SpVgg Erkenschwick | 0–2 | Borussia Mönchengladbach |
| 18:30 | | Report (in German) | Mølby 64'; Dahlin 80' | Attendance: 15,000; Referee: Kemmerling (Hannover) |

| 3 August 1993 | Bayern Munich (A) | 2–1 (a.e.t.) | FC Homburg | Munich |
| 20:00 | Münch 25', 118' | Report (in German) | Simon 49' | Stadium: Stadion an der Grünwalder Strasse; Attendance: 7,000; Referee: Fückler (Karlsruhe) |

| 4 August 1993 | 1. FC Pforzheim | 0–4 | 1. FC Kaiserslautern | Pforzheim |
| 18:00 | | Report (in German) | Kuntz 8'; Marin 30'; Wagner 31'; Kadlec 87' | Attendance: 7,000; Referee: Schmidt (Bad Hersfeld) |

| 4 August 1993 | FC Remscheid | 2–3 | Hertha BSC | Remscheid |
| 20:15 | Kosanovic 51'; Stocki 70' (pen.) | Report (in German) | Gries 13'; Kosanovic 39' (o.g.); Schmöller 83' | Stadium: Röntgenstadion; Attendance: 2,000; Referee: Heinz-Dieter Casper (Dortmund) |

| 4 August 1993 | SV Böblingen | 0–5 | MSV Duisburg | Böblingen |
| 18:00 | | Report (in German) | Reinmayr 2'; Nijhuis 24'; Steininger 50'; Weidemann 55'; Közle 82' | Attendance: 4,000; Referee: Hoffmann (Kehl) |

| 4 August 1993 | FSV Salmrohr | 1–3 | 1. FC Saarbrücken | Salmtal |
| 18:30 | Thömmes 77' | Report (in German) | Wynalda 45'; Lust 54'; Savichev 81' | Attendance: 3,200; Referee: Wicht (Bonn) |

| 4 August 1993 | VfL Osnabrück | 0–4 | Hannover 96 | Osnabrück |
| 20:00 | | Report (in German) | Weiland 17', 69'; Schjønberg 77', 82' | Stadium: Stadion an der Bremer Brücke; Attendance: 5,000; Referee: Peter Weise (Gera) |

=== Second round ===
| 24 August 1993 | TSV Havelse | 0–3 | Karlsruher SC | Garbsen |
| | | Report (in German) | Carl 32'; Schuster 50'; Bender 56' | Stadium: A-Platz; Attendance: 4,000; Referee: Lutz Pohlmann (Felde) |

| 24 August 1993 | TSF Ditzingen | 0–2 | Hansa Rostock | Ditzingen |
| | | Report (in German) | Dowe 61'; März 90' (pen.) | Attendance: 2,500; Referee: Kemm (Ubstadt-Weiher) |

| 24 August 1993 | 1. FC Magdeburg | 3–3 (a.e.t.) (5–4 p) | Wuppertaler SV | Magdeburg |
| | Grempler 86'; Kohn 90'; Rother 111' | Report (in German) | Tönnies 33'; Feinbier 73', 107' | Stadium: Ernst-Grube-Stadion; Attendance: 5,000; Referee: Bodo Brandt-Cholle (Berlin) |
| | Penalties |
| | Siersleben (penalty scored); Grempler (penalty scored); Baumann (penalty scored); Mackel (penalty scored); Reinke (penalty scored) | | Feinbier (penalty scored); Klein (penalty scored); Ksienzyk (penalty scored); Schwinkendorf (penalty scored); Broos (penalty missed) |

| 24 August 1993 | FC Oberneuland | 1–8 | Chemnitzer FC | Bremen |
| | Eichel 72' | Report (in German) | Gerber 20', 26', 76'; Mehlhorn 25'; Torunarigha 63'; Meißner 74'; Keller 86'; Renn 89' | Stadium: Sportpark Vinnenweg; Attendance: 1,000; Referee: Winter (Wildeshausen) |

| 24 August 1993 | ASV Neumarkt | 0–4 | Tennis Borussia Berlin | Neumarkt |
| | | Report (in German) | Rusyayev 22', 53'; Vogel 69'; Goulet 90' | Attendance: 1,200; Referee: Müller (Gera) |

| 24 August 1993 | SpVgg Plattling | 0–3 | Borussia Mönchengladbach | Plattling |
| | | Report (in German) | Pflipsen 8'; Criens 27', 43' | Attendance: 5,500; Referee: Roland Schäfer (Frankenthal) |

| 24 August 1993 | Sportfreunde Ricklingen | 0–1 | MSV Duisburg | Ricklingen |
| | | Report (in German) | Nijhuis 35' | Attendance: 4,100; Referee: Torsten Koop (Lüttenmark) |

| 24 August 1993 | FC Augsburg | 2–0 (a.e.t.) | Rot-Weiss Lüdenscheid | Augsburg |
| | Heiß 11'; Hanke 80' | Report (in German) | | Stadium: Rosenaustadion; Attendance: 800; Referee: Holger Dehmelt (Sabachwalden) |

| 24 August 1993 | SV Darmstadt 98 | 1–2 (a.e.t.) | Bayern Munich (A) | Darmstadt |
| | Baban 59' | Report (in German) | Grill 89'; Ott 102' | Stadium: Stadion am Böllenfalltor; Attendance: 2,500; Referee: Herbert Eli (Idar-Oberstein) |

| 24 August 1993 | SC Freiburg | 4–1 | Fortuna Köln | Freiburg |
| | Todt 11'; Burić 37', 39'; Cardoso 66' | Report (in German) | Brandts 48' | Stadium: Dreisamstadion; Attendance: 5,500; Referee: Hans Fux (Stutensee) |

| 24 August 1993 | 1. FC Köln | 4–1 | SV Waldhof Mannheim | Cologne |
| | Rudy 11'; Polster 28', 69'; Janßen 55' | Report (in German) | Hecker 88' | Attendance: 8,000; Referee: Hellmut Krug (Gelsenkirchen) |

| 24 August 1993 | Hertha BSC | 3–5 (a.e.t.) | Hamburger SV | Berlin |
| | Schmöller 8'; O. Schmidt 15'; Gries 56' | Report (in German) | Von Heesen 29'; Ivanauskas 36', 112'; Junghans 38' (o.g.); Bäron 108' | Stadium: Olympiastadion; Attendance: 20,700; Referee: Frank Fleske (Eisenhüttenstadt) |

| 24 August 1993 | Alemannia Aachen | 0–3 | 1. FC Saarbrücken | Aachen |
| | | Report (in German) | Zambiasi 71'; Krätzer 80'; Lust 82' | Stadium: Tivoli; Attendance: 7,000; Referee: Michael Prengel (Düsseldorf) |

| 24 August 1993 | Borussia Dortmund | 0–1 | Carl Zeiss Jena | Dortmund |
| | | Report (in German) | Schreiber 11' | Stadium: Westfalenstadion; Attendance: 17,500; Referee: Jürgen Jansen (Essen) |

| 24 August 1993 | Bayer Uerdingen | 1–0 | VfB Leipzig | Krefeld |
| | Feldhoff 8' | Report (in German) | | Stadium: Grotenburg-Stadion; Attendance: 2,400; Referee: Edgar Steinborn (Sinzig) |

| 24 August 1993 | EFC Stahl | 0–2 | SpVgg Unterhaching | Eisenhüttenstadt |
| | | Report (in German) | Bergen 10'; Bogdan 25' (pen.) | Stadium: Stadion der Hüttenwerker; Attendance: 1,000; Referee: Sather (Grimma) |

| 24 August 1993 | SV Mettlach | 0–2 | SG Wattenscheid 09 | Mettlach |
| | | Report (in German) | Löbe 51', 77' | Attendance: 7,000; Referee: Herbert Fandel (Kyllburg) |

| 24 August 1993 | FC Sachsen Leipzig | 2–2 (a.e.t.) (3–4 p) | FC St. Pauli | Leipzig |
| | Saalbach 69'; Leitzke 90' (pen.) | Report (in German) | Pröpper 30'; Zander 707' | Attendance: 7,000; Referee: Günther Habermann (Weißensee) |
| | Penalties |
| | Weitzke (penalty missed); König (penalty scored); Hammermüller (penalty scored); Pfitzner (penalty scored); Leitzke (penalty missed) | | Gronau (penalty scored); Driller (penalty scored); Pröpper (penalty scored); Zander (penalty scored) |

| 24 August 1993 | VfB Gaggenau | 1–3 (a.e.t.) | Hannover 96 | Gaggenau |
| | Kolasinac 74' | Report (in German) | Schulz 55', 102'; Breitenreiter 97' | Attendance: 3,300; Referee: Windsperger (Reichenberg) |

| 24 August 1993 | SpVgg Marl | 3–2 | Borussia Fulda | Marl |
| | Tudyka 35'; Braasch 55', 85' | Report (in German) | Goumai 46'; Michel 90' | Attendance: 900; Referee: Jörg Hotop (Cologne) |

| 24 August 1993 | Greifswalder SC | 0–2 | TSG Pfeddersheim | Greifswald |
| | | Report (in German) | Padilla 20'; Heilmann 55' | Stadium: Volksstadion; Attendance: 500; Referee: Michael Wendorf (Berlin) |

| 24 August 1993 | Eintracht Haiger | 3–1 | FC Elmshorn 1920 | Haiger |
| | Klein 4', 56'; Mittwoch 70' | Report (in German) | Lütje 57' | Attendance: 9,000; Referee: Rainer Werthmann (Bochum) |

| 24 August 1993 | 1. FC Bocholt | 2–3 | Rot-Weiss Essen | Bocholt |
| | Scharf 61'; Lipinski 66' | Report (in German) | Grein 8'; Bangoura 37'; Dondera 68' | Stadium: Stadion am Hünting; Attendance: 3,300; Referee: H. Willems (Mönchengladbach) |

| 24 August 1993 | Kickers Offenbach | 4–2 (a.e.t.) | SV Meppen | Offenbach |
| | Hartmann 84'; Albert 90'; Krapp 92'; Faltin 112' (o.g.) | Report (in German) | Rauffmann 40'; Schulte 80' | Stadium: Bieberer Berg Stadion; Attendance: 4,500; Referee: Bernhard Zerr (Ottersweier) |

| 24 August 1993 | Werder Bremen | 2–1 (a.e.t.) | Stuttgarter Kickers | Bremen |
| | Herzberger 93' (o.g.); Bockenfeld 96' | Report (in German) | Koch 104' | Stadium: Weserstadion; Attendance: 4,800; Referee: Karl-Heinz Gläser (Breitungen) |

| 24 August 1993 | Dynamo Dresden | 0–0 (a.e.t.) (4–2 p) | VfL Wolfsburg | Dresden |
| | | Report (in German) | | Stadium: Rudolf-Harbig-Stadion; Attendance: 3,900; Referee: Winfried Buchhart (Schrobenhausen) |
| | Penalties |
| | Stevic (penalty missed); Schößler (penalty scored); Maucksch (penalty scored); Kmetsch (penalty scored); Pilz (penalty scored) | | Lieberam (penalty scored); Gerstner (penalty scored); Ballwanz (penalty missed); Täuber (penalty missed) |

| 24 August 1993 | Fortuna Düsseldorf | 0–2 | Eintracht Frankfurt | Düsseldorf |
| | | Report (in German) | Binz 10'; Yeboah 75' | Stadium: Rheinstadion; Attendance: 17,000; Referee: Jürgen F. Wippermann (Bonn) |

| 24 August 1993 | Eintracht Braunschweig | 4–3 | VfB Oldenburg | Braunschweig |
| | Sedláček 17'; Radojević 39'; Probst 45', 59' | Report (in German) | Ehle 20'; Zierott 49'; Ekmesic 80' | Stadium: Stadion an der Hamburger Straße; Attendance: 4,500; Referee: Carsten Byernetzki (Hamburg) |

| 24 August 1993 | Bayer Leverkusen | 3–0 | 1. FC Nürnberg | Leverkusen |
| | Fischer 10'; Wörns 48'; Kirsten 86' | Report (in German) | | Stadium: Ulrich-Haberland-Stadion; Attendance: 10,000; Referee: Alfons Berg (Konz) |

| 24 August 1993 | Carl Zeiss Jena (A) | 0–2 | Bayern Munich | Jena |
| | | Report (in German) | Wouters 6'; Nerlinger 61' | Stadium: Ernst-Abbe-Sportfeld; Attendance: 7,800; Referee: Frank Kiefer (Baunatal) |

| 25 August 1993 | Schalke 04 | 1–0 (a.e.t.) | VfL Bochum | Gelsenkirchen |
| | Luginger 98' | Report (in German) | | Stadium: Parkstadion; Attendance: 14,000; Referee: Karl-Josef Assenmacher (Fischenich) |

| 25 August 1993 | VfB Stuttgart | 2–6 (a.e.t.) | 1. FC Kaiserslautern | Stuttgart |
| | Kruse 56'; Buchwald 84' | Report (in German) | Lusch 12'; Ritter 36'; Wagner 97'; Kuntz 98'; Eriksson 100'; Haber 109' | Stadium: Gottlieb-Daimler-Stadion; Attendance: 24,000; Referee: Hans-Joachim Osmers (Bremen) |

=== Third round ===
| 11 September 1993 | Borussia Mönchengladbach | 5–3 (a.e.t.) | Karlsruher SC | Mönchengladbach |
| | | Report (in German) | | Stadium: Bökelbergstadion; Attendance: 19,000; Referee: Manfred Harder (Lüneburg) |

The Borussia Mönchengladbach – Karlsruher SC tie was replayed on a neutral ground, after Karlsruhe's goalkeeper Oliver Kahn was injured by an object thrown by opposing supporters.

| 26 October 1993 Replay | Karlsruher SC | 0–1 | Borussia Mönchengladbach | Düsseldorf |
| | | Report (in German) | Kastenmaier 80' | Stadium: Rheinstadion; Attendance: 38,000; Referee: Hellmut Krug (Gelsenkirchen) |

| 11 September 1993 | SC Freiburg | 5–3 (a.e.t.) | Eintracht Frankfurt | Freiburg |
| | Rraklli 19', 102'; Freund 48', 99'; Braun 55' | Report (in German) | Bein 52'; Furtok 82', 87' | Stadium: Dreisamstadion; Attendance: 14,500; Referee: Hermann Albrecht (Kaufbeuren) |

| 11 September 1993 | Schalke 04 | 2–3 (a.e.t.) | Bayern Munich | Gelsenkirchen |
| | Eckstein 27'; Mulder 113' | Report (in German) | Kreuzer 87', 114'; Ziege 120' | Stadium: Parkstadion; Attendance: 38,700; Referee: Günther Habermann (Weißensee) |

| 11 September 1993 | 1. FC Saarbrücken | 2–4 | Hamburger SV | Saarbrücken |
| | Savichev 45', 71' | Report (in German) | Bäron 5'; Ivanauskas 15'; Letchkov 18', 49' | Attendance: 8,500; Referee: Manfred Amerell (Munich) |

| 11 September 1993 | Chemnitzer FC | 1–2 (a.e.t.) | SG Wattenscheid 09 | Chemnitz |
| | Renn 95' | Report (in German) | Prinzen 99'; Lesniak 110' | Stadium: Stadion an der Gellertstraße; Attendance: 3,700; Referee: Frank Fleske (Eisenhüttenstadt) |

| 11 September 1993 | 1. FC Magdeburg | 1–5 | Bayer Leverkusen | Magdeburg |
| | Grempler 47' | Report (in German) | Nehl 25'; Fischer 36'; Paulo Sérgio 69', 88'; Thom 72' (pen.) | Stadium: Ernst-Grube-Stadion; Attendance: 20,000; Referee: Bernd Hauer (Celle) |

| 11 September 1993 | Eintracht Hager | 1–3 (a.e.t.) | 1. FC Kaiserslautern | Haiger |
| | Klein 11' | Report (in German) | Wagner 32', 115'; Waldschmidt 94' (o.g.) | Attendance: 5,000; Referee: H. Willems (Mönchengladbach) |

| 11 September 1993 | Bayern Munich (A) | 0–0 (a.e.t.) (5–4 p) | 1. FC Köln | Munich |
| | | Report (in German) | | Stadium: Stadion an der Grünwalder Strasse; Attendance: 3,000; Referee: Thomas Leimert (Ludwigshafen) |
| | Penalties |
| | Hamann (penalty scored); Frey (penalty scored); Protzel (penalty scored); Grill (penalty scored); Cerny (penalty scored) | | Rudy (penalty missed); Weiser (penalty scored); Heldt (penalty scored); Greiner (penalty scored); Christofte (penalty scored) |

| 11 September 1993 | TSG Pfeddersheim | 1–3 (a.e.t.) | MSV Duisburg | Pfeddersheim |
| | Kaiser 17' (pen.) | Report (in German) | Reinmayr 2'; Wohlert 93'; Preetz 114' | Attendance: 4,500; Referee: Wagner (Hofheim) |

| 11 September 1993 | Kickers Offenbach | 1–1 (a.e.t.) (3–5 p) | Werder Bremen | Offenbach |
| | Biehrer 102' | Report (in German) | Rufer 100' | Stadium: Bieberer Berg Stadion; Attendance: 17,000 |
| | Penalties |
| | Hartmann (penalty scored); Krapp (penalty scored); Aleksic (penalty scored); Schäfer (penalty missed) | | Rufer (penalty scored); Votava (penalty scored); Legat (penalty scored); Basler (penalty scored); Borowka (penalty scored) |

| 11 September 1993 | Rot-Weiss Essen | 3–2 (a.e.t.) | FC St. Pauli | Essen |
| | Geschlecht 67', 99'; Bangoura 72' | Report (in German) | Driller 11', 55' | Stadium: Georg-Melches-Stadion; Attendance: 9,000; Referee: Georg Dardenne (Nettersheim) |

| 11 September 1993 | Bayer Uerdingen | 2–3 | Carl Zeiss Jena | Krefeld |
| | Weber 43'; Gorlukovich 74' | Report (in German) | Wittke 11'; Schreiber 50', 58' | Stadium: Grotenburg-Stadion; Attendance: 3,000; Referee: Heinz-Dieter Casper (Dortmund) |

| 11 September 1993 | SpVgg Unterhaching | 1–2 | Hansa Rostock | Munich |
| | Lemberger 70' | Report (in German) | Chalaskiewicz 29'; Sänger 35' | Stadium: Generali Sportpark; Attendance: 1,200; Referee: Hans Wolf (Stuttgart) |

| 11 September 1993 | Eintracht Braunschweig | 0–1 | Tennis Borussia Berlin | Braunschweig |
| | | Report (in German) | Aksoy 85' (pen.) | Stadium: Stadion an der Hamburger Straße; Attendance: 4,300; Referee: Torsten Koop (Lüttermark) |

| 11 September 1993 | FC Augsburg | 3–0 | SpVgg Marl | Augsburg |
| | Hecht 26'; Schroll 72'; Radlmaier 63' | Report (in German) | | Stadium: Rosenaustadion; Attendance: 1,300; Referee: Günther Frey (Neu-Ulm) |

| 11 September 1993 | Hannover 96 | 2–3 | Dynamo Dresden | Hannover |
| | Klutz 55'; Schjønberg 63' (pen.) | Report (in German) | Rank 43'; Marschall 43'; Penksa 70' | Stadium: Niedersachsenstadion; Attendance: 16,900; Referee: Reinhard Kuhne (Hamburg) |

=== Round of 16 ===
| 26 October 1993 | SC Freiburg | 3–0 | Hansa Rostock | Freiburg |
| | Braun 4'; Todt 38'; Simon 76' | Report (in German) | | Stadium: Dreisamstadion; Attendance: 10,700; Referee: Hans-Peter Best (Kämpfelbach) |

| 26 October 1993 | FC Augsburg | 0–0 (3–4 p) | Bayer Leverkusen | Augsburg |
| | | Report (in German) | | Stadium: Rosenaustadion; Attendance: 18,000; Referee: Roland Schäfer (Frankenthal) |
| | Penalties |
| | Motzke (penalty missed); Heiß (penalty scored); Hecht (penalty scored); Hanke (penalty missed); Becker (penalty scored); Radlmaier (penalty missed) | | Foda (penalty scored); Kree (penalty missed); Thom (penalty scored); Wörns (penalty scored); Schuster (penalty missed); Becker (penalty scored) |

| 27 October 1993 | Carl Zeiss Jena | 1–0 | SG Wattenscheid | Jena |
| | Akpoborie 26' | Report (in German) | | Stadium: Ernst-Abbe-Sportfeld; Attendance: 5,100; Referee: Bernd Hauer (Celle) |

| 27 October 1993 | Werder Bremen | 4–2 | Hamburger SV | Bremen |
| | Herzog 13'; Hobsch 74'; Neubarth 86'; Rufer 90' | Report (in German) | Von Heesen 49'; Ivanauskas 64' | Stadium: Weserstadion; Attendance: 34,400; Referee: Wolf-Günter Wiesel (Ottbergen) |

| 27 October 1993 | Rot-Weiss Essen | 4–2 | MSV Duisburg | Essen |
| | Kügler 3'; Lipinski 39' (pen.); Margref 58'; Wegmann 84' | Report (in German) | Wohlert 47'; Papic 61' | Stadium: Georg-Melches-Stadion; Attendance: 24,000; Referee: Jürgen Aust (Cologne) |

| 27 October 1993 | Bayern Munich (A) | 3–3 (a.e.t.) (3–4 p) | Tennis Borussia Berlin | Munich |
| | Stegmayer 13'; Grill 62'; Hamann 114' (pen.) | Report (in German) | Vogel 29'; Schröder 41'; Boer 114' | Stadium: Stadion an der Grünwalder Strasse; Attendance: 1,400; Referee: Günther Frey (Neu-Ulm) |
| | Penalties |
| | Frey (penalty scored); Hamann (penalty scored); Protzel (penalty scored); Karataev (penalty scored); Zickler (penalty missed) | | Hey (penalty scored); Goldbaek (penalty scored); Muschiol (penalty scored); Aksoy (penalty scored); Goulet (penalty scored) |

| 9 November 1993 | Dynamo Dresden | 2–1 | Bayern Munich | Dresden |
| | Penksa 21'; Marschall 89' | Report (in German) | Scholl 78' | Stadium: Rudolf-Harbig-Stadion; Attendance: 23,700; Referee: Alfons Berg (Konz) |

| 9 November 1993 | Borussia Mönchengladbach | 2–3 | 1. FC Kaiserslautern | Mönchengladbach |
| | Fach 39'; Dahlin 51' | Report (in German) | Stadler 1' (o.g.); Brehme 13' (pen.); Fuchs 83' | Stadium: Bökelbergstadion; Attendance: 15,000; Referee: Eugen Strigel (Horb) |

=== Quarter-finals ===
| 30 November 1993 | FC Carl Zeiss Jena | 0–0 (a.e.t.) (5–6 p) | Rot-Weiss Essen | Jena |
| | | Report (in German) | | Stadium: Ernst-Abbe-Sportfeld; Attendance: 5,200; Referee: Bernhard Zerr (Ottersweier) |
| | Penalties |
| | Wittke (penalty missed); Penzel (penalty scored); Szangolies (penalty scored); Akpoborie (penalty scored); Gütschow (penalty scored); Bliss (penalty scored); Schreiber (penalty missed) | | Lipinski (penalty missed); Pickenäcker (penalty scored); Spyrka (penalty scored); Kügler (penalty scored); Wegmann (penalty scored); Bangoura (penalty scored); Reichert (penalty scored) |

| 1 December 1993 | SC Freiburg | 0–1 | Tennis Borussia Berlin | Freiburg |
| | | Report (in German) | Keim 16' | Stadium: Dreisamstadion; Attendance: 9,000; Referee: Manfred Führer (Steinhagen) |

| 1 December 1993 | Dynamo Dresden | 1–1 (a.e.t.) (5–4 p) | Bayer Leverkusen | Dresden |
| | Schmäler 99' | Report (in German) | Paulo Sérgio 97' | Stadium: Rudolf-Harbig-Stadion; Attendance: 15,400; Referee: Hartmut Strampe (Handorf) |
| | Penalties |
| | Schößler (penalty scored); Marschall (penalty scored); Mauscksch (penalty scored); Kmetsch (penalty scored); Pilz (penalty scored) | | Paulo Sérgio (penalty scored); Foda (penalty scored); Hapal (penalty missed); Wörns (penalty scored); Thom (penalty scored) |

| 9 February 1994 | Werder Bremen | 2–2 (a.e.t.) (4–3 p) | 1. FC Kaiserslautern | Dresden |
| | Rufer 30'; Bode 110' | Report (in German) | Sforza 27'; Ross 115' | Stadium: Weserstadion; Attendance: 13,400; Referee: Aron Schmidhuber (Ottobrunn) |
| | Penalties |
| | Rufer (penalty scored); Schaaf (penalty scored); Votava (penalty scored); Legat (penalty missed); Basler (penalty scored) | | Brehme (penalty missed); Sforza (penalty scored); Kadlec (penalty scored); Funkel (penalty scored); Ritter (penalty missed) |

=== Semi-finals ===
| 8 March 1994 | Rot-Weiss Essen | 2–0 | Tennis Borussia Berlin | Essen |
| | Bangoura 27'; Margef 66' | Report (in German) | | Stadium: Georg-Melches-Stadion; Attendance: 22,000; Referee: Hans-Joachim Osmers (Bremen) |

| 9 March 1994 | Dynamo Dresden | 0–2 | Werder Bremen | Dresden |
| | | Report (in German) | Rufer 18'; Neubarth 37' | Stadium: Rudolf-Harbig-Stadion; Attendance: 29,000; Referee: Karl-Josef Assenmacher (Fischenich) |

=== Final ===
14 May 1994
18:15 CEST

| Werder Bremen | 3–1 | Rot-Weiss Essen |
|---|---|---|
| Beiersdorfer 17'; Herzog 38'; Rufer 88' (pen.) | Report | Bangoura 50' |

Olympiastadion, Berlin
Attendance: 76,391
Referee: Manfred Amerell (Munich)
