= 1993 DFB-Pokal final =

- Match programme cover
- Event: 1992–93 DFB-Pokal
| Bayer Leverkusen | Hertha BSC Amateure |
| 1 | 0 |
- Date: 12 June 1993
- Venue: Olympiastadion, Berlin
- Referee: Markus Merk (Kaiserslautern)
- Attendance: 76,391

The 1993 DFB-Pokal final decided the winner of the 1992–93 DFB-Pokal, the 50th season of Germany's premier knockout football cup competition. It was played on 12 June 1993 at the Olympiastadion in Berlin. Hertha BSC's second team, playing in the third division, made it to the final against Bayer Leverkusen, making it the first and only time a reserve side has made it to the final, as second teams have since been disallowed from entering the competition. Leverkusen won the match 1–0 to claim their first cup title, qualifying for the 1993–94 European Cup Winners' Cup and the 1993 DFB-Supercup.

== Route to the final ==
The DFB-Pokal began with 83 teams in a single-elimination knockout cup competition. There were a total of five rounds leading up to the final. Teams were drawn against each other, and the winner after 90 minutes would advance. If still tied, 30 minutes of extra time was played. If the score was still level, a penalty shoot-out was used to determine the winner.

Note: In all results below, the score of the finalist is given first (H: home; A: away).

| Bayer Leverkusen | | Round | Hertha BSC Amateure |
|---|---|---|---|---|
| Opponent | Result | 1992–93 DFB-Pokal | Opponent | Result |
| ASV Bergedorf (A) | 3–1 | Round 1 | Bye |
| 1. FC Kaiserslautern (H) | 1–0 | Round 2 | SGK Heidelberg (H) | 3–0 |
| VfR Heilbronn (A) | 2–0 | Round 3 | VfB Leipzig (H) | 4–2 |
| Hertha BSC (H) | 1–0 | Round of 16 | Hannover 96 (H) | 4–3 |
| Carl Zeiss Jena (A) | 2–0 | Quarter-finals | 1. FC Nürnberg (H) | 2–1 |
| Eintracht Frankfurt (A) | 3–0 | Semi-finals | Chemnitzer FC (H) | 2–1 |

== Match ==
=== Details ===
12 June 1993
18:00 CEST

| Bayer Leverkusen | 1–0 | Hertha BSC Amateure |
|---|---|---|
| Kirsten 77' | Report |

Olympiastadion, Berlin
Attendance: 76,391
Referee: Markus Merk (Kaiserslautern)

| Bayer Leverkusen | Hertha BSC Amateure |

| GK | 1 | (Germany) Rüdiger Vollborn |
| SW | 5 | (Germany) Franco Foda (c) |
| CB | 6 | (Germany) Martin Kree |
| CB | 4 | (Germany) Christian Wörns |
| RWB | 2 | (Germany) Andreas Fischer |
| LWB | 3 | (Germany) Markus Happe |
| CM | 8 | (Romania) Ioan Lupescu |
| CM | 7 | (Germany) Heiko Scholz |
| CM | 10 | (Czech Republic) Pavel Hapal |
| CF | 11 | (Germany) Andreas Thom |
| CF | 9 | (Germany) Ulf Kirsten | Booked |
Manager:
(Federal Republic of Yugoslavia) Dragoslav Stepanović

| GK | 1 | (Germany) Christian Fiedler |
| SW | 5 | (Germany) Sven Meyer |
| CB | 2 | (Germany) Oliver Schmidt | (substituted off) 73' |
| CB | 7 | (Germany) Karsten Nied (c) |
| RWB | 10 | (Germany) Gerald Klews |
| LWB | 4 | (Germany) Wolfgang Kolczyk |
| CM | 3 | (Germany) Carsten Ramelow |
| CM | 8 | (Germany) Andreas Schmidt |
| AM | 6 | (Germany) Sven Kaiser |
| CF | 9 | (Germany) Oliver Holzbecher |
| CF | 11 | (Turkey) Ayhan Gezen |
Substitutes:
| FW | 12 | (Germany) Sascha Höpfner | (substituted in) 73' |
Manager:
(Germany) Jochem Ziegert

Match rules

- 90 minutes.
- 30 minutes of extra time if necessary.
- Penalty shoot-out if scores still level.
- Maximum of two substitutions.
