= 1992–93 DFB-Pokal =

Tournament details
- Country: Germany
- Teams: 83

Final positions
- Champions: Bayer Leverkusen
- Runners-up: Hertha BSC II

Tournament statistics
- Matches played: 82
- Top goal scorer: Andreas Thom (6)

The 1992–93 DFB-Pokal was the 50th season of the annual German football cup competition. 83 teams competed in the tournament of seven rounds which began on 18 August 1992 and ended on 12 June 1993. In the final Bayer Leverkusen defeated the second team of Hertha Berlin 1–0. It was the first time a third-tier team made it to the DFB-Pokal final, and the only time a reserve team has.

== Matches ==
Times up to 26 September 1992 and from 28 March 1993 are CEST (UTC+2). Times from 27 September 1992 to 27 March 1993 are CET (UTC+1).

=== First round ===
18 August 1992	BSG Stahl Brandenburg	0–2	1. FC Kaiserslautern	Brandenburg
19:00		Report (in German)	Marin 15'; Kuntz 69'	Attendance: 2,900; Referee: Karl-Heinz Gläser (Breitungen)

18 August 1992	Wacker Nordhausen	0–8	1. FC Köln	Nordhausen
19:00		Report (in German)	Littbarski 41'; Ordenewitz 47' (pen.), 65'; Sturm 53'; Flick 77'; Heldt 80'; Rudy 83'; Greiner 90'	Attendance: 5,000; Referee: Essbach (Leipzig)

18 August 1992	FC Gundelfingen	0–1	Bayer Uerdingen	Gundelfingen
19:00		Report (in German)	Bremser 59'	Attendance: 5,000; Referee: Holger Dehmelt (Sabachwalden)

18 August 1992	1860 Munich	1–2	Dynamo Dresden	Munich
19:00	Kneißl 16'	Report (in German)	Kmetsch 32'; Stevic 59'	Attendance: 14,000; Referee: Hans-Peter Best (Kämpfelbach)

18 August 1992	Bayer Leverkusen (A)	2–2 (a.e.t.) (5–6 p)	Hamburger SV	Leverkusen
19:00	Oswald 36'; Haselbach 81'	Report (in German)	Letchkov 19'; Dotchev 82'	Stadium: Ulrich-Haberland-Stadion; Attendance: 4,000; Referee: Leonhard Ketsch (Essen)
	Penalties
	Haselbach (penalty scored); Kentschke (penalty scored); Happe (penalty scored); Hanke (penalty scored); Stõver (penalty scored); Kurth (penalty scored); Müller (penalty scored); Oswald (penalty missed)		Bester (penalty scored); Letchkov (penalty scored); Rohde (penalty scored); Von Heesen (penalty scored); Spies (penalty scored); Spörl (penalty scored); Dotchev (penalty scored); Golz (penalty scored)

18 August 1992	TSV Osterholz	1–7	1. FC Nürnberg	Bremen
19:00	Kuhl 83'	Report (in German)	Wück 1'; Dorfner 16'; Eckstein 45'; Kramny 50'; Fengler 66' (pen.); Rösler 69'; Zietsch 88'	Stadium: BSA Schevemoor, Platz 1 Attendance: 2,200; Referee: Reinhard Kuhne (Hamburg)

19 August 1992	SV Wehen	2–3	Eintracht Frankfurt	Taunusstein
19:00	Sauer 89'; Raab 90'	Report (in German)	Binz 36'; Klein 38'; Yeboah 84'	Attendance: 10,000; Referee: Volkmar Fischer (St. Wendel)

19 August 1992	Kickers Emden	1–5	1. FC Saarbrücken	Emden
19:00	Hinrichs 78'	Report (in German)	Wynalda 18', 83', 85'; Lust 51'; Krätzer 74'	Attendance: 10,000; Referee: Jürgen Jansen (Essen)

19 August 1992	Fortuna Düsseldorf (A)	1–2	Borussia Mönchengladbach	Düsseldorf
19:00	Istenic 77'	Report (in German)	Dahlin 2'; Salou 46'	Attendance: 5,500; Referee: Schmidt (Bad Hersfeld)

19 August 1992	Jahn Regensburg	2–1	VfB Lübeck	Regensburg
19:00	House 35', 45'	Report (in German)	Harth 42'	Attendance: 1,500; Referee: Günther Frey (Neu-Ulm)

19 August 1992	Hallescher FC	1–4	Borussia Dortmund	Halle
19:00	Zorn 73'	Report (in German)	Karl 29', 39'; Mill 37'; Sippel 83'	Stadium: Kurt-Wabbel-Stadion; Attendance: 10,800; Referee: Frank Fleske (Eisenhüttenstadt)

19 August 1992	SpVgg Fürth	0–2	VfL Bochum	Fürth
19:00		Report (in German)	Moutas 4'; Schwanke 70'	Attendance: 4,800; Referee: Hans Wolf (Stuttgart)

19 August 1992	Lüneburger SK	0–3	Karlsruher SC	Lüneburg
19:00		Report (in German)	Krieg 23'; Bogdan 73'; Carl 88'	Attendance: 6,500; Referee: Michael Malbranc (Hamburg)

19 August 1992	1. SC Göttingen 05	1–3	Schalke 04	Göttingen
19:00	Schulz 10'	Report (in German)	Christensen 60'; Scherr 66', 69'	Stadium: Maschparkstadion; Attendance: 15,000; Referee: Burkhard Hufgard (Mömbris)

19 August 1992	FSV Salmrohr	2–0	SG Wattenscheid 09	Salmtal
19:00	Ramadani 13'; Thömmes 61'	Report (in German)		Attendance: 3,500; Referee: Tobias Welz (Wiesbaden)

19 August 1992	SC Jülich 1910	1–5 (a.e.t.)	Werder Bremen	Jülich
19:00	Perschke 65'	Report (in German)	Rufer 76', 108'; Kohn 95', 119'; Allofs 103'	Attendance: 6,000; Referee: Gerhard Theobold (Neunkirchen)

19 August 1992	Sportfreunde Siegen	0–6	VfB Stuttgart	Siegen
19:00		Report (in German)	Golke 1', 3', 22'; Gaudino 20'; Dubajic 55'; Strunz 58'	Stadium: Leimbachstadion; Attendance: 17,000; Referee: Jürgen F. Wippermann (Bonn)

19 August 1992	FC Bergedorf 85	1–3	Bayer Leverkusen	Hamburg
19:00	Hammer 84'	Report (in German)	Fischer 34'; Kirsten 64'; Thom 89'	Stadium: Sander Tannen 1 Attendance: 10,000; Referee: Füllbrunn (Ihrhove)

25 August 1992	Borussia Neunkirchen	0–6	Bayern Munich	Neunkirchen
19:00		Report (in German)	Thon 18' (pen.); Labbadia 24', 90'; Schupp 75'; Ziege 77', 81'	Stadium: Ellenfeldstadion; Attendance: 17,000; Referee: Michael Prengel (Düsseldorf)

=== Second round ===
11 September 1992	Viktoria Aschaffenburg	0–6	VfL Osnabrück	Aschaffenburg
19:00		Report (in German)	Da Palma 12'; Meinke 23'; Hetmanski 25', 50', 60'; Wollitz 81'	Stadium: Am Schönbusch; Attendance: 900; Referee: Schäfer (Oggersheim)

11 September 1992	MSV Duisburg	0–0 (a.e.t.) (4–3 p)	1. FC Köln	Duisburg
19:00		Report (in German)		Stadium: Wedaustadion; Attendance: 17,000; Referee: Lutz Michael Fröhlich (Berlin)
	Penalties
	Harforth (penalty scored); Tarnat (penalty scored); Schmidt (penalty scored); Nijhus (penalty scored)		Steinmann (penalty scored); Ordenewitz (penalty scored); Heldt (penalty scored); Higl (penalty missed); Littbarski (penalty missed)

11 September 1992	Karlsruher SC	4–2	Hamburger SV	Karlsruhe
19:00	Krieg 3'; Wittwer 17' (pen.); Letchkov 22' (o.g.); Shmarov 88'	Report (in German)	Bester 5', 12'	Stadium: Wildparkstadion; Attendance: 14,000; Referee: Aron Schmidhuber (Ottobrunn)

11 September 1992	Fortuna Köln	0–1	SV Meppen	Köln
19:00		Report (in German)	Rauffmann 7'	Stadium: Rasenplatz BSA Südstadion; Attendance: 1,500; Referee: Hans-Jürgen Weber (Essen)

11 September 1992	VfL Bochum	1–2	Hannover 96	Bochum
19:00	Wegmann 34'	Report (in German)	Raickovic 58'; Groth 85'	Attendance: 8,500; Referee: Norbert Haupt (Berlin)

12 September 1992	Bischofswerdaer FV	3–2	VfB Oldenburg	Bischofswerda
19:00	A. Schmidt 43' (pen.); Pordzik 59'; Löpelt 84'	Report (in German)	Linke 58'; Drulak 63'	Attendance: 2,600; Referee: Lorenz (Amberg)

12 September 1992	Rot-Weiß Erfurt	0–0 (a.e.t.) (2–4 p)	Bayer Uerdingen	Erfurt
19:00		Report (in German)		Stadium: Steigerwaldstadion; Attendance: 4,000; Referee: Müller (Dresden)
	Penalties
	Heun (penalty scored); Bühner (penalty scored); Otto (penalty missed); Bärwolf (penalty missed)		Klein (penalty scored); Küsters (penalty scored); Peschke (penalty scored); Gorlukovich (penalty missed); Jüptner (penalty scored)

12 September 1992	SC 08 Bamberg	1–3	Eintracht Frankfurt	Amberg
19:00	Skoric 16'	Report (in German)	Kruse 32'; Yeboah 46', 86'	Attendance: 10,000; Referee: Peter Weise (Gera)

12 September 1992	Sportfreunde Ricklingen	5–4 (a.e.t.)	SC Verl	Ricklingen
19:00	Krause 14', 105', 118'; Kristeleit 26'; Gremmel 72'	Report (in German)	Westermann 9', 119'; Meyer 37'; Schmitz 38'	Attendance: 1,400; Referee: Reinemann

12 September 1992	Freiburger FC	0–3	FSV Mainz 05	Freiburg
19:00		Report (in German)	Hayer 40'; Buvac 64'; Wagner 81'	Stadium: Schönbergstadion; Attendance: 1,000; Referee: Fückel (Grötzingen)

12 September 1992	Stuttgarter Kickers	1–2	Chemnitzer FC	Stuttgart
19:00	Bittermann 75' (o.g.)	Report (in German)	Barsikow 81', 82'	Stadium: Kickers-Stadion; Attendance: 2,300; Referee: Hellmut Krug (Gelsenkirchen)

12 September 1992	Wormatia Worms	2–4	Fortuna Düsseldorf	Worms
19:00	Niederhöfer 45'; Berg 73'	Report (in German)	Hutwelker 8', 90'; Drazic 30'; Degen 69'	Stadium: Wormatia-Stadion; Attendance: 2,500; Referee: Kuhn (Orscholz)

12 September 1992	FC St. Pauli	2–3 (a.e.t.)	1. FC Nürnberg	Hamburg
19:00	Ottens 9'; Gronau 53'	Report (in German)	Rösler 11'; Eckstein 42'; Zietsch 93'	Stadium: Millerntor-Stadion; Attendance: 12,200; Referee: Günther Habermann (Weißensee)

12 September 1992	Bayer Leverkusen	1–0	1. FC Kaiserslautern	Leverkusen
19:00	Kree 84' (pen.)	Report (in German)		Attendance: 10,500; Referee: Rainer Boos (Kronberg)

12 September 1992	Werder Bremen (A)	1–2	Borussia Mönchengladbach	Bremen
19:00	Deering 77'	Report (in German)	Schulz 76'; Criens 84' (pen.)	Attendance: 2,500; Referee: Gigar (Hamburg)

12 September 1992	Carl Zeiss Jena	2–1	1. FC Saarbrücken	Jena
19:00	Klee 24'; Akpoborie 90'	Report (in German)	Savichev 89'	Stadium: Ernst-Abbe-Sportfeld; Attendance: 4,600; Referee: Peter Mölm (Bremerhaven)

12 September 1992	FC Remscheid	2–1	SV Darmstadt 98	Remscheid
19:00	Pröpper 19', 29'	Report (in German)	Old 45'	Stadium: Röntgen-Stadion; Attendance: 1,500; Referee: Bernd Domurat (Datteln)

12 September 1992	SSV Ulm 1846	2–1	Post Neubrandenburg	Ulm
19:00	Kastl 32'; Trkulja 73'	Report (in German)	Ruthenberg 13'	Stadium: Donaustadion; Attendance: 1,600; Referee: Holz (Lauingen)

12 September 1992	SpVgg Plattling	2–1	Jahn Regensburg	Regensburg
19:00	Klostermeier 11'; Köglmeier 72' (pen.)	Report (in German)	Sieber 54'	Attendance: 1,500; Referee: Karl Gangkofer (Eggenfelden)

12 September 1992	EFC Stahl	1–1 (a.e.t.) (5–4 p)	Wuppertaler SV	Eisenhüttenstadt
19:00	Culafic 94'	Report (in German)	Vogt 118'	Stadium: Stadion der Hüttenwerker; Attendance: 1,500; Referee: Sather (Grimma)
	Penalties
	Klenge (penalty scored); M. Schulz (penalty scored); Bartz (penalty scored); Weber (penalty scored); K. Scholz (penalty missed); Culafic (penalty scored)		Schmugge (penalty missed); Ksienzyk (penalty scored); Bieber (penalty scored); Kindgen (penalty scored); Pusch (penalty scored); Klein (penalty missed)

12 September 1992	SpVgg Beckum	0–7	Werder Bremen	Beckum
19:00		Report (in German)	Legat 21'; Bode 26', 38'; Beiersdorfer 44'; Allofs 50'; Kohn 73'; Herzog 86'	Attendance: 6,100; Referee: Fervers (Mönchengladbach)

12 September 1992	SpVgg Bad Homburg	1–5	Eintracht Braunschweig	Bad Homburg
19:00	Ziegler 36'	Report (in German)	Aden 6', 40', 52'; Butrej 68'; Heskamp 80'	Attendance: 1,100; Referee: Rainer Werthmann (Bochum)

12 September 1992	Hansa Rostock	2–0 (a.e.t.)	VfB Stuttgart	Rostock
19:00	Lange 103'; Kubala 106'	Report (in German)		Attendance: 10,000; Referee: Hartmut Strampe (Handorf)

12 September 1992	TuS Hoppstädten	0–3	VfR Heilbronn	Hoppstädten
19:00		Report (in German)	Schuster 83'; Schmid 88', 90'	Attendance: 700; Referee: Kreis (Nalbach)

12 September 1992	VfR Aalen	1–2	FC Homburg	Aalen
19:00	Knecht 62'	Report (in German)	Finke 13'; Hubner 29'	Attendance: 2,000; Referee: Hautzinger (Eppingen)

12 September 1992	Dynamo Dresden	2–3	VfB Leipzig	Dresden
19:00	Jähnig 43'; Zander 70'	Report (in German)	Rische 18'; Lindner 42'; Hobsch 79'	Stadium: Rudolf-Harbig-Stadion; Attendance: 5,500; Referee: Markus Merk (Kaiserslautern)

12 September 1992	Hertha BSC (A)	3–0	SGK Heidelberg	Berlin
19:00	Holzbecher 7', 46'; Milinkovic 27'	Report (in German)		Attendance: 500; Referee: Klaus-Dieter Stenzel (Forst)

12 September 1992	FSV Altmark Stendal	0–1	FSV Salmrohr	Stendal
19:00			Wagner 57'	Attendance: 2,100; Referee: Joachim Ren (Salzgitter)

12 September 1992	Borussia Dortmund	2–2 (a.e.t.) (5–4 p)	Bayern Munich	Dortmund
19:00	Reinhardt 8'; Chapuisat 84'	Report (in German)	Labbadia 16'; Mazinho 58'	Stadium: Westfalenstadion; Attendance: 37,400; Referee: Hans-Joachim Osmers (Bremen)
	Penalties
	Reuter (penalty scored); Poschner (penalty scored); Reinhardt (penalty scored); Chapuisat (penalty scored); Zorc (penalty scored)		Schwabl (penalty scored); Wouters (penalty scored); Kreuzer (penalty scored); Mazinho (penalty missed); Schupp (penalty scored)

13 September 1992	Rot-Weiss Essen	2–0	Schalke 04	Essen
19:00	Crnogaj 26'; Lipinski 89'	Report (in German)		Stadium: Georg-Melches-Stadion; Attendance: 19,300; Referee: Hans-Peter Dellwing (Trier)

13 September 1992	Rot-Weiss Frankfurt	3–4	SV Waldhof Mannheim	Frankfurt
19:00	Rexroth 20', 56'; Kunz 86'	Report (in German)	Schmäler 5', 14'; Freiler 16'; Weidemann 85'	Attendance: 1,300; Referee: Hoffmann (Telms)

13 September 1992	SC Freiburg	2–4	Hertha BSC	Freiburg
19:00	Seeliger 31'; Rraklli 65'	Report (in German)	Lünsmann 59'; Gries 72'; Basler 74'; Gezen 89'	Stadium: Dreisamstadion; Attendance: 4,500; Referee: Manfred Amerell (München)

=== Third round ===
9 October 1992	SSV Ulm 1846	1–3	Borussia Dortmund	Ulm
19:00	Simon 18'	Report (in German)	Reinhardt 1'; Zorc 50'; Lusch 90'	Stadium: Donaustadion; Attendance: 12,000; Referee: Alfons Berg (Konz)

9 October 1992	1. FC Nürnberg	5–2 (a.e.t.)	FC Remscheid	Nuremberg
19:00	Bäurle 3'; Eckstein 32'; Rösler 102'; Wück 107'; Kramny 16'	Report (in German)	Putz 3', 89'	Stadium: Frankenstadion; Attendance: 11,500; Referee: Kurt Witke (Mönchzell)

9 October 1992	VfL Osnabrück	4–1	Borussia Mönchengladbach	Osnabrück
19:00	Karp 47'; Wollitz 60' (pen.); Meinke 63'; Da Palma 87'	Report (in German)	Steffen 44'	Attendance: 20,000; Referee: Hans Scheuerer (München)

10 October 1992	Werder Bremen	3–1	FSV Mainz 05	Bremen
19:00	Bode 21'; Rufer 43' (pen.); Kohn 60'	Report (in German)	Klopp 73'	Stadium: Weserstadion; Attendance: 4,900; Referee: Hartmut Strampe (Handorf)

10 October 1992	Bischofswerdaer FV	0–1 (a.e.t.)	Karlsruher SC	Bischofswerda
19:00		Report (in German)	Carl 112'	Attendance: 4,900; Referee: Bodo Brandt-Cholle (Berlin)

10 October 1992	VfR Heilbronn	0–2	Bayer Leverkusen	Heilbronn
19:00		Report (in German)	Kree 56'; Rydlewicz 86'	Attendance: 7,200; Referee: Peter Weise (Gera)

10 October 1992	MSV Duisburg	3–1	Eintracht Braunschweig	Duisburg
19:00	Preetz 10'; Tarnat 24'; Nijhuis 66'	Report (in German)	Löchelt 25'	Stadium: Wedaustadion; Attendance: 8,200; Referee: Thomas Leimert (Ludwigshafen)

10 October 1992	Fortuna Düsseldorf	2–2 (a.e.t.) (3–0 p)	Hansa Rostock	Düsseldorf
19:00	Buncol 48'; Albertz 110'	Report (in German)	Lange 42'; Wahl 98'	Stadium: Rheinstadion; Attendance: 4,000; Referee: Vollmar Kiefer (Kassel)
	Penalties
	Schmadtke (penalty scored); Backhaus (penalty scored); Loose (penalty scored)		Sänger (penalty missed); Lange (penalty missed); Dowe (penalty missed)

10 October 1992	Sportfreunde Ricklingen	0–2	Chemnitzer FC	Ricklingen
19:00		Report (in German)	Torunarigha 42'; Heidrich 72'	Attendance: 3,500; Referee: Lutz Pohlmann (Felde)

10 October 1992	SpVgg Plattling	1–3	Carl Zeiss Jena	Plattling
19:00	Klostermeter 46'	Report (in German)	Klee 2'; Bliss 33'; Fankhänel 65'	Attendance: 2,000; Referee: Hans Fux (Stutensee)

10 October 1992	FSV Salmrohr	0–1	FC Homburg	Salmrohr
19:00		Report (in German)	Jurgeleit 87'	Stadium: Salmtalstadion; Attendance: 2,500; Referee: Josef Funken (Heinsberg)

10 October 1992	Hertha BSC (A)	4–2	VfB Leipzig	Berlin
19:00	Gezen 9'; Lehmann 52', 58'; Kaiser 82'	Report (in German)	Edmond 44'; Turowski 74'	Attendance: 1,700; Referee: Frank Fleske (Eisenhüttenstadt)

10 October 1992	Rot Weiss Essen	3–2	EFC Stahl	Essen
19:00	Dondera 61', 81'; Ridder 77'	Report (in German)	Wittke 42'; Weber 75'	Stadium: Georg-Melches-Stadion; Attendance: 8,000; Referee: Rainer Werthmann (Bochum)

10 October 1992	Bayer Uerdingen	0–1	Hannover 96	Krefeld
19:00		Report (in German)	Daschner 59'	Stadium: Grotenburg Stadion; Attendance: 6,000; Referee: Manfred Amerell (München)

10 October 1992	Eintracht Frankfurt	4–1 (a.e.t.)	SV Waldhof Mannheim	Frankfurt
19:00	Yeboah 100'; Schmitt 106', 107'; Binz 110'	Report (in German)	Winkler 120'	Stadium: Waldstadion; Attendance: 9,000; Referee: Karl-Heinz Gläser (Breitungen)

10 October 1992	SV Meppen	2–4 (a.e.t.)	Hertha BSC	Meppen
19:00	Gartmann 11'; Marell 18'	Report (in German)	Feinbier 27'; Basler 90'; Klews 108'; Demandt 115'	Stadium: Emslandstadion; Attendance: 5,000; Referee: Jürgen F. Wippermann (Bonn)

=== Round of 16 ===
6 November 1992	Carl Zeiss Jena	3–2 (a.e.t.)	MSV Duisburg	Jena
19:00	Löhnert 86'; Wittke 103'; Schreiber 105'	Report (in German)	Azzouzi 15'; Stuckmann 106'	Stadium: Ernst-Abbe-Sportfeld; Attendance: 7,000; Referee: Hans-Joachim Osmers (Bremen)

6 November 1992	FC Homburg	0–0 (a.e.t.) (2–4 p)	1. FC Nürnberg	Homburg
19:00		Report (in German)		Stadium: Waldstadion; Attendance: 9,000; Referee: Dardenne (Metternich)
	Penalties
	Homp (penalty missed); Jurgeleit (penalty scored); Korell (penalty missed); Cardoso (penalty scored)		Oechler (penalty scored); Kramny (penalty scored); Dorfner (penalty scored); Friedmann (penalty scored)

6 November 1992	Hertha BSC (A)	4–3	Hannover 96	Berlin
19:00	Holzbecher 55'; Gezen 61'; O. Schmidt 66', 87'	Report (in German)	Heisig 4'; Kretzschmar 48'; Sirocks 74'	Stadium: Friedrich-Ludwig-Jahn-Stadion; Attendance: 6,300; Referee: Günther Habermann (Weißensee)

7 November 1992	Bayer Leverkusen	1–0	Hertha BSC	Leverkusen
19:00	Thom 83'	Report (in German)		Stadium: Ulrich-Haberland-Stadion; Attendance: 58,000; Referee: Hans Scheuerer (München)

7 November 1992	Fortuna Düsseldorf	0–1	Karlsruher SC	Düsseldorf
19:00		Report (in German)	Krieg 85'	Stadium: Rheinstadion; Attendance: 10,200; Referee: Gerhard Theobald (Neunkirchen)

7 November 1992	Eintracht Frankfurt	3–1	VfL Osnabrück	Frankfurt
19:00	Kruse 15'; Okocha 45'; Schmitt 67'	Report (in German)	Meinke 40'	Stadium: Waldstadion; Attendance: 9,000; Referee: Hans-Peter Best (Kämpfelbach)

7 November 1992	Rot-Weiss Essen	0–1	Chemnitzer FC	Essen
19:00		Report (in German)	Heidrich 87'	Stadium: Georg-Melches-Stadion; Attendance: 13,000; Referee: Karl-Josef Assenmacher (Fischenich)

7 November 1992	Werder Bremen	2–0	Borussia Dortmund	Bremen
19:00	Rufer 14', 85'	Report (in German)		Stadium: Weserstadion; Attendance: 33,100; Referee: Aron Schmidhuber (Ottobrunn)

=== Quarter-finals ===
1 December 1992	Hertha BSC (A)	2–1	1. FC Nürnberg	Berlin
19:00	Zimmermann 69'; Lehmann 90'	Report (in German)	Bäurle 89'	Stadium: Mommsenstadion; Attendance: 13,700; Referee: Hans-Jürgen Kasper (Katlenburg)

1 December 1992	Chemnitzer FC	2–1 (a.e.t.)	Werder Bremen	Chemnitz
19:00	Renn 91'; Heidrich 95'	Report (in German)	Allofs 120'	Stadium: Stadion an der Gellertstraße; Attendance: 15,600; Referee: Lothar Löwer (Unna)

1 December 1992	Carl Zeiss Jena	0–2	Bayer Leverkusen	Jena
19:00		Report (in German)	Thom 29', 80'	Stadium: Ernst-Abbe-Sportfeld; Attendance: 9,200; Referee: Klaus-Dieter Stenzel (Forst)

2 December 1992	Karlsruher SC	1–1 (a.e.t.) (3–5 p)	Eintracht Frankfurt	Karlsruhe
19:00	Shmarov 50'	Report (in German)	Yeboah 40'	Stadium: Wildparkstadion; Attendance: 29,000; Referee: Bernd Heynemann (Magdeburg)
	Penalties
	Reich (penalty scored); Metz (penalty scored); Wittwer (penalty missed); Carl (penalty scored)		Bein (penalty scored); Bommer (penalty scored); Binz (penalty scored); Okocha (penalty scored); Stein (penalty scored)

=== Semi-finals ===
30 March 1993	Eintracht Frankfurt	0–3	Bayer Leverkusen	Frankfurt
19:00		Report (in German)	Thom 6', 75'; Kirsten 72'	Stadium: Waldstadion; Attendance: 35,000; Referee: Manfred Harder (Lüneburg)

30 March 1993	Hertha BSC (A)	2–1	Chemnitzer FC	Berlin
19:00	Ramelow 5'; Meyer 22'	Report (in German)	Heidrich 36' (pen.)	Stadium: Olympiastadion; Attendance: 56,500; Referee: Eugen Strigel (Horb)

=== Final ===
12 June 1993
18:00 CEST

Bayer Leverkusen	1–0	Hertha BSC Amateure
Kirsten 77'	Report

Olympiastadion, Berlin
Attendance: 76,391
Referee: Markus Merk (Kaiserslautern)
