= Jordan Torunarigha =

Nigerian footballer (born 1997)

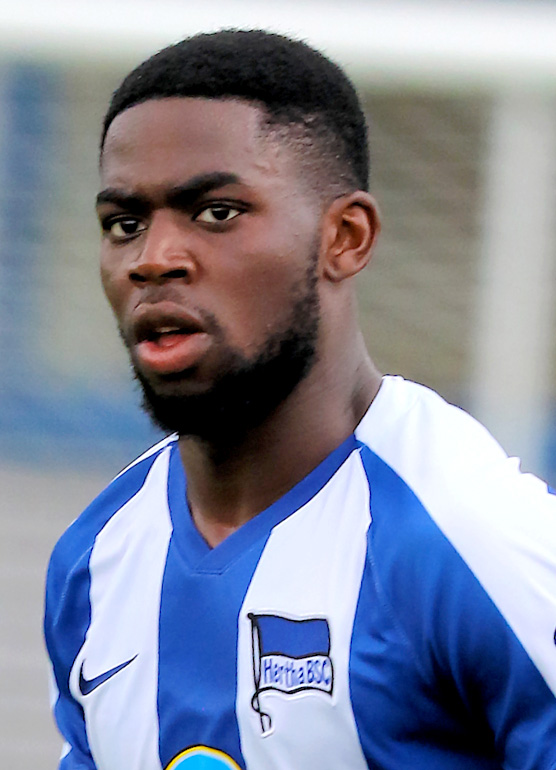
- Torunarigha with Hertha BSC in 2019

Personal information
- Full name: Jordan Torunarigha
- Date of birth: 7 August 1997 (age 29)
- Place of birth: Chemnitz, Germany
- Height: 1.91 m (6 ft 3 in)
- Position: Centre-back

Team information
- Current team: Hamburger SV
- Number: 23

Youth career
- –2006: Chemnitzer FC
- 2006–2016: Hertha BSC

Senior career*
Years	Team	Apps	(Gls)
2015–2020	Hertha BSC II	45	(3)
2016–2022	Hertha BSC	73	(5)
2022	→ Gent (loan)	8	(0)
2022–2025	Gent	100	(4)
2025–	Hamburger SV	29	(0)

International career^{‡}
2012–2013	Germany U16	7	(0)
2014–2015	Germany U18	2	(0)
2015	Germany U19	6	(0)
2016–2017	Germany U20	8	(0)
2018–2019	Germany U21	4	(0)
2021	Germany Olympic	3	(0)
2023–	Nigeria	1	(0)
- * Club domestic league appearances and goals as of 1 November 2026 ‡ National team caps and goals as of 18:19, 16 October 2023 (UTC)

Jordan Torunarigha (born 7 August 1997) is a professional footballer who plays as a centre-back for Bundesliga club Hamburger SV. He is the son of former footballer Ojokojo Torunarigha and the brother of current footballer Junior Torunarigha. Having represented Germany at various youth level, he switched nationality to represent the Nigeria national team.

== Club career ==
=== Early career ===
Born in Chemnitz, Torunarigha joined Hertha BSC as a child in 2006 and signed his first professional contract on 19 December 2016. He played as a striker before Hertha's U-15 coach Ante Čović had the idea to make him switch into a defender.

=== Hertha Berlin ===
He made his debut for the first team on 4 February 2017, coming on as a 90th-minute substitute in a 1–0 win over FC Ingolstadt. He made his first start for the Hertha on 5 April 2017 against Borussia Mönchengladbach, starting at left back following illness to Marvin Plattenhardt and suspension for Maximilian Mittelstädt. He scored his first goal for the club in a 2–0 win over Darmstadt 98 on 13 May 2017, sending Hertha up to 5th in the table with one match remaining.

==== Loan to Gent ====
On 28 January 2022, Torunarigha joined Gent in the Belgian First Division A on loan.

=== Gent ===
On 19 July 2022, Torunarigha joined Gent on a permanent basis, signing a three-year deal.

=== Hamburger SV ===
On 1 July 2025, Torunarigha joined Hamburger SV on a free transfer. Torunarigha has made 73 caps and 5 goals with Hertha BSC from 2016–17 season until 2021–22 season before joining Gent on a permanent basis in 2022.

== International career ==
In May 2018, after representing Germany at youth international level, he turned down the opportunity to represent Nigeria.

In June 2023, he announced he has switched allegiance to represent the Nigeria national team.

== Career statistics ==
=== Club ===
As of match played 1 November 2026

Appearances and goals by club, season and competition
Club	Season	League			National cup		Europe		Other		Total	
Club	Season	Division	Apps	Goals	Apps	Goals	Apps	Goals	Apps	Goals	Apps	Goals
Hertha BSC II	2015–16	Regionalliga Nordost	22	2	—		—		—		22	2
Hertha BSC II	2016–17	Regionalliga Nordost	10	0	—		—		—		10	0
Hertha BSC II	2017–18	Regionalliga Nordost	10	1	—		—		—		10	1
Hertha BSC II	2018–19	Regionalliga Nordost	1	0	—		—		—		1	0
Hertha BSC II	2019–20	Regionalliga Nordost	2	0	—		—		—		2	0
Hertha BSC II	Total		45	3	—		—		—		45	3
Hertha BSC	2016–17	Bundesliga	8	1	0	0	—		—		8	1
Hertha BSC	2017–18	Bundesliga	12	1	0	0	—		—		12	1
Hertha BSC	2018–19	Bundesliga	14	2	2	0	—		—		16	2
Hertha BSC	2019–20	Bundesliga	18	1	3	1	—		—		21	2
Hertha BSC	2020–21	Bundesliga	14	0	0	0	—		—		14	0
Hertha BSC	2021–22	Bundesliga	7	0	0	0	—		—		7	0
Hertha BSC	Total		73	5	5	1	—		—		78	6
Gent (loan)	2021–22	Belgian Pro League	8	0	2	0	2 (Note: Appearances in UEFA Conference League)	0	3 (Note: Appearances in Belgian Pro League play-offs)	0	15	0
Gent	2022–23	Belgian Pro League	34	3	1	0	10 (Note: Two appearances in UEFA Europa League, eight appearances in UEFA Conference League)	0	—		45	3
Gent	2023–24	Belgian Pro League	33	1	1	0	10	0	—		44	1
Gent	2024–25	Belgian Pro League	25	0	2	0	9	0	—		36	0
Gent	Total		100	4	6	0	31	0	3	0	140	4
Hamburger SV	2025–26	Bundesliga	24	0	3	0	—		—		27	0
Hamburger SV	2026–27	Bundesliga	5	0	0	0	—		—		5	0
Hamburger SV	Total		29	0	3	0	—		—		32	0
Career total			247	12	14	1	31	0	3	0	295	13

=== International ===
As of match played 16 October 2023

Appearances and goals by national team and year
National team	Year	Apps	Goals
Nigeria	2023	1	0
Total		1	0

== Honours ==
Gent

- Belgian Cup: 2021–22

== Personal life ==
In 2021, Torunarigha featured in Schwarze Adler, a documentary detailing the experiences of Black players in German professional football. Jordan is of Nigerian descent.
