= 1993–94 Bayernliga =

Bayernliga
- Season: 1993–94
- Champions: FC Augsburg
- Relegated: SpVgg Plattling
- Amateur championship: SV Lohhof
- Matches played: 272
- Goals scored: 827 (3.04 per match)
- Top goalscorer: Christian Radlmaier (22 goals)

The 1993–94 season of the Bayernliga, the third tier of the German football league system in the state of Bavaria at the time, was the 49th season of the league. It was the last season of the league at the third tier of the league system as, from 1994 onward, it slipped to the fourth tier because of the introduction of the Regionalliga as a new tier between 2. Bundesliga and Oberliga.

== Overview ==
The league champions, FC Augsburg, qualified for the promotion round to the 2. Bundesliga where the club was however unsuccessful in winning promotion. Augsburg qualified for the new Regionalliga Süd instead. It was the fourth Bayernliga title for Augsburg, having previously won the league in 1972–73, 1979–80 and 1981–82.

Alongside Augsburg five other clubs from the Bayernliga qualified for the new Regionalliga, SpVgg Fürth and TSV Vestenbergsgreuth who would merge In 1996, SV Lohhof, SpVgg Unterhaching and the reserve team of FC Bayern Munich. Qualifying was determined on a points system covering the previous three seasons rather than just 1993–94.

Runners-up SV Lohhof also qualified for the German amateur championship, where it came last in the southern group and was knocked-out.

Because of the departure of six clubs to the new Regionalliga only one team was relegated from the league, last placed SpVgg Plattling. For Plattling, who had first entered the league in 1950 and spend 25 seasons at this level all up, it was the end of an era as the club did not return to the Bayernliga after 1994. The 16th placed team, SSV Jahn Regensburg successfully defended its league place in the relegation play-off.

Christian Radelmaier of FC Augsburg was the top scorer of the league with 22 goals.

== Table ==
The 1993–94 season saw five new clubs in the league, Wacker Burghausen, VfB Helmbrechts, FC Gundelfingen and SpVgg Plattling, all promoted from the Landesliga Bayern, while SpVgg Unterhaching had been relegated from the 2. Bundesliga to the league.

For both FC Gundelfingen and Wacker Burghausen it was the first time to play in the Bayernliga while SpVgg Plattling had returned after a single seasons absence, having been relegated in 1992, and VfB Helmbrechts the season before. SpVgg Unterhaching, the 1991–92 Bayernliga champions, returned to the league after just a single season in the 2. Bundesliga.

Pos	Team	Pld	W	D	L	GF	GA	GD	Pts	Promotion, qualification or relegation
1	FC Augsburg (C, Q)	32	23	5	4	70	29	+41	51	Qualification to 2. Bundesliga promotion round & Regionalliga
2	SV Lohhof (Q)	32	17	11	4	61	29	+32	45	Qualification to German amateur championship & Regionalliga
3	SpVgg Unterhaching (Q)	32	18	7	7	65	32	+33	43	Qualification to Regionalliga
4	FC Bayern München Amateure (Q)	32	17	6	9	53	32	+21	40	Qualification to Regionalliga
5	SpVgg Landshut	32	16	6	10	53	43	+10	38	
6	SpVgg Fürth (Q)	32	16	4	12	64	41	+23	36	Qualification to Regionalliga
7	SV Wacker Burghausen	32	14	7	11	44	40	+4	35	
8	TSV Vestenbergsgreuth (Q)	32	14	5	13	56	49	+7	33	Qualification to Regionalliga
9	FC Schweinfurt 05	32	12	8	12	61	58	+3	32	
10	FC Passau	32	11	8	13	35	39	−4	30	
11	FC Starnberg	32	11	8	13	44	50	−6	30	
12	SpVgg Bayreuth	32	9	11	12	47	53	−6	29	
13	FC Memmingen	32	6	13	13	50	66	−16	25	
14	VfB Helmbrechts	32	7	9	16	36	60	−24	23	
15	FC Gundelfingen	32	7	9	16	27	53	−26	23	
16	SSV Jahn Regensburg	32	4	11	17	29	76	−47	19	Qualification to relegation play-off
17	SpVgg Plattling (R)	32	4	4	24	32	77	−45	12	Relegation to Landesliga Bayern

Source: manfredsfussballarchiv.de, f-archiv.de
Rules for classification: 1) Points; 2) Decider;
(C) Champions; (Q) Qualified for the phase indicated; (R) Relegated

== 2. Bundesliga promotion round ==
In Group 3 the champions of the Oberliga Nordrhein, Oberliga Westfalen and the Bayernliga as well as the runners-up of the Oberliga Nord competed for one promotion spot to the 2. Bundesliga:

Pos	Team	Pld	W	D	L	GF	GA	GD	Pts	Promotion, qualification or relegation
1	Fortuna Düsseldorf (P)	6	5	1	0	10	3	+7	11	Promotion to 2. Bundesliga
2	Eintracht Braunschweig	6	2	1	3	5	6	−1	5	
3	TuS Paderborn-Neuhaus	6	2	0	4	8	9	−1	4	
4	FC Augsburg	6	1	2	3	5	10	−5	4	

Source: Weltfussball.de
Rules for classification: 1) Points; 2) Goal difference;
(P) Promoted

== Regionalliga qualifying ==
Six clubs from the Bayernliga qualified for the new Regionalliga, based on a points system that took the last three seasons into account. For a first-place finish 17 points were awarded, for every place below one point less with the 17th placed team receiving just one point. Points were doubled for the 1992–93 season and tripled for the 1993–94 season. Teams from above the Bayernliga in any of these seasons received maximum points for that year, resulting in SpVgg Unterhaching receiving 34 points for playing in the 2. Bundesliga in 1992–93. The points table:

Rank	Club	Points 1991–94	Place in 1993–94
1	SpVgg Unterhaching	96	3
2	FC Augsburg	89	1
3	SV Lohhof	84	2
4	SpVgg Fürth	83	6
5	FC Bayern München Amateure	82	4
6	TSV Vestenbergsgreuth	74	8
7	FC Schweinfurt 05	56	9
8	SpVgg Landshut	51	5
9	FC Memmingen	44	13
10	FC Starnberg	41	11
11	SpVgg Bayreuth	41	12
12	FC Passau	40	10
13	SSV Jahn Regensburg	34	16
14	Wacker Burghausen	33	7
15	VfB Helmbrechts	12	14
16	FC Gundelfingen	9	15
17	SpVgg Plattling	4	17

== Bayernliga promotion round ==
Because of the departure of six clubs to the Regionalliga promoted to the Bayernliga was expanded in 1993–94 with all Landesliga champions and runners-up directly promoted. Additionally, the 16th placed Bayernliga team had to face the third placed teams of the three Landesligas for three more places in the Bayernliga, with only the loser of the second round, SpVgg Weiden missing out on a Bayernliga place.

Date	Match			Result
Semi-finals : in Kareth-Lappersdorf and Forchheim
3 June 1994	MTV Ingolstadt (Süd)	–	SpVgg Weiden (Mitte)	4–2 aet
4 June 1994	SSV Jahn Regensburg	–	VfL Frohnlach (Nord)	2–3
Final : in Schwandorf
10 June 1994	SSV Jahn Regensburg	–	SpVgg Weiden	1–0
