= Junior Torunarigha =

Nigerian-German footballer (born 1990)

Personal information
- Date of birth: 18 April 1990 (age 36)
- Place of birth: Ibadan, Nigeria
- Height: 1.91 m (6 ft 3 in)
- Position: Forward

Youth career
- 1996–2001: SV Fortuna Furth Glösa
- 2001–2006: Chemnitzer FC
- 2006–2009: Hertha BSC

Senior career*
Years	Team	Apps	(Gls)
2008–2011	Hertha BSC II	47	(11)
2011–2012	Rot-Weiß Oberhausen	20	(1)
2012–2013	TSG Neustrelitz	19	(5)
2013–2014	Carl Zeiss Jena	13	(3)
2014–2015	ZFC Meuselwitz	18	(1)
2015–2016	FC Amberg	17	(2)
2016–2017	Fortuna Sittard	23	(3)
2017–2018	Alemannia Aachen	27	(9)
2018	Zagłębie Sosnowiec	10	(0)
- * Club domestic league appearances and goals as of 5 February 2020

Junior Torunarigha (born 18 April 1990) is a Nigerian professional footballer who plays as a forward.

== Career ==
Born in Ibadan, Torunarigha has played for SV Fortuna Furth Glösa, Chemnitzer FC, Hertha BSC, Rot-Weiß Oberhausen, TSG Neustrelitz, Carl Zeiss Jena, ZFC Meuselwitz, FC Amberg and Fortuna Sittard.

== Personal life ==
He also holds German citizenship.

His father, Ojokojo, is a former footballer who played for a number of clubs in Germany, while his younger brother Jordan is also a footballer.
