= Karsten Nied =

German footballer

Personal information
- Full name: Karsten Nied
- Date of birth: 8 August 1969 (age 57)
- Place of birth: West Germany
- Position: Defender

Youth career
- 1975–1988: Hertha BSC

Senior career*
Years	Team	Apps	(Gls)
1988–1993	Hertha BSC (A)		
1993–1994	Tennis Borussia Berlin (A)		
1994–1996	FC Gütersloh		
1996–1998	Spandauer SV	50	(4)
- * Club domestic league appearances and goals

Karsten Nied (born 8 August 1969) is a former German footballer who was part of the Hertha BSC reserve team that reached the 1992–93 DFB-Pokal final.
