= Korell =

Korell is a surname. Notable people with the surname include:

- Franklin F. Korell (1889–1965), American attorney and politician
- Steffen Korell (born 1971), German football player
- Thomas Korell (born 1983), German politician
- Hanna Korell (born 1979), Finnish sprinter
- Simone Korell (born 1968), squash player
