= Dragoslav Stepanović =

Serbian footballer and coach

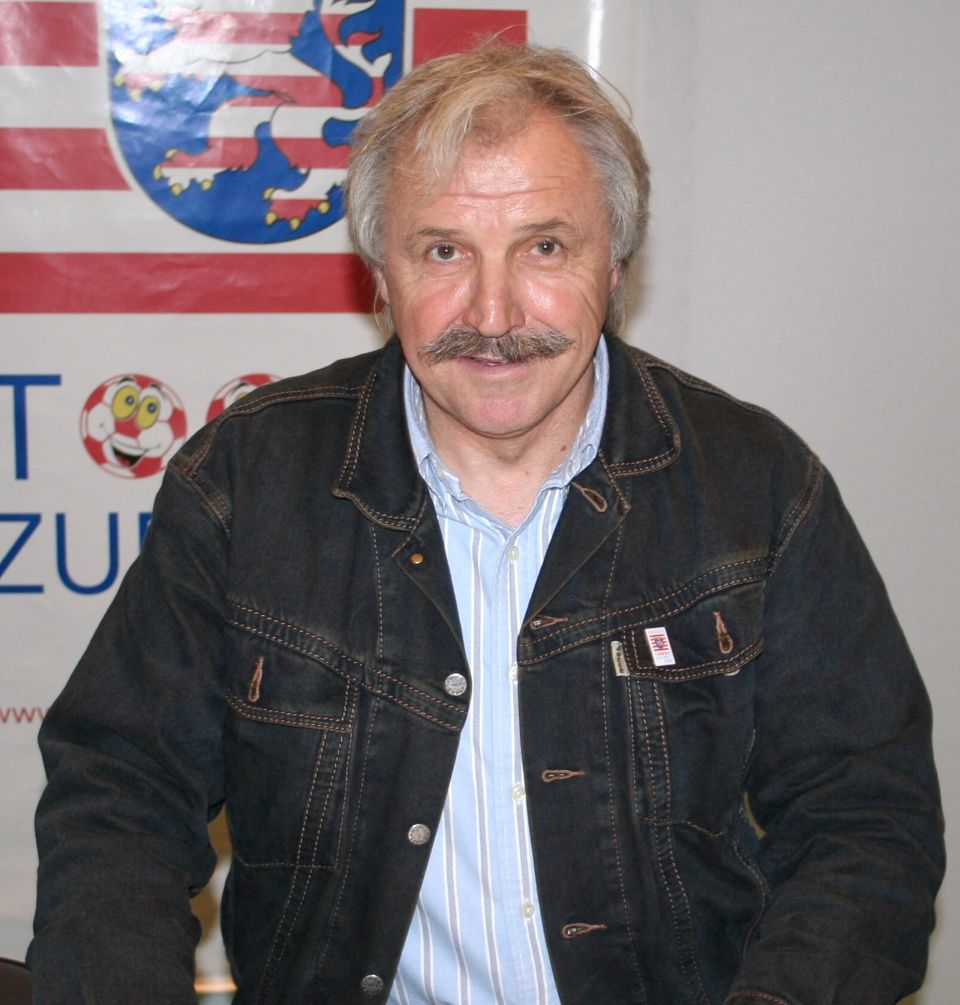
- Stepanović in 2005

Personal information
- Full name: Dragoslav Stepanović
- Date of birth: 30 August 1948 (age 78)
- Place of birth: Rekovac, PR Serbia, Yugoslavia
- Position: Defender

Youth career
- Mladi Proleter
- 1962–1966: OFK Belgrade

Senior career*
Years	Team	Apps	(Gls)
1966–1973	OFK Belgrade	201	(11)
1973–1976	Red Star Belgrade	30	(2)
1976–1978	Eintracht Frankfurt	49	(3)
1978–1979	Wormatia Worms	33	(0)
1979–1981	Manchester City	15	(0)
1981–1982	Wormatia Worms	16	(0)
Total		344	(16)

International career
1970–1976	Yugoslavia	34	(1)

Managerial career
- 1982–1985: FV Progres Frankfurt
- 1985–1987: FSV Frankfurt
- 1988–1990: Rot-Weiß Frankfurt
- 1991: Eintracht Trier
- 1991–1993: Eintracht Frankfurt
- 1993–1995: Bayer Leverkusen
- 1995–1996: Athletic Bilbao
- 1996: Eintracht Frankfurt
- 1998: AEK Athens
- 1999: VfB Leipzig
- 2000: Stuttgarter Kickers
- 2000: Kickers Offenbach
- 2001: Rot-Weiß Oberhausen
- 2003: Shenyang Jinde
- 2004: Zamalek
- 2007–2008: Čukarički
- 2009: Vojvodina
- 2010: Laktaši
- 2014: Radnički Niš
- * Club domestic league appearances and goals

Dragoslav Stepanović (Serbian Cyrillic: Драгослав Степановић, pronounced [drâɡoslaʋ stepǎːnoʋitɕ]; born 30 August 1948) is a Serbian retired football player and coach.

== Club career ==
Stepanović made his name with OFK Beograd where he was a right back fixture for 11 years between 1962 and 1973, before moving on to Red Star Belgrade for three seasons until 1976. Due to the transfer age restrictions in SFR Yugoslavia he had to wait until 28 years of age to move abroad.

Stepanović's first stop abroad was Bundesliga with Eintracht Frankfurt where he became affectionately known as Steppi. He played in Frankfurt for two seasons (1976–1978). Next came a one-season stint with Wormatia Worms.

In July 1979 he joined English club Manchester City F.C. for £140,000, and spent two seasons there.

He finished out his career back in Germany with Wormatia Worms in 1981–82 season.

== International career ==
Stepanović is a former Yugoslav international, and used to be a favourite of national team head coach Vujadin Boškov. He earned a total of 34 caps, scoring 1 goal, and his final international was a February 1976 friendly match away against Algeria.

=== International goals ===
Scores and results list Yugoslavia's goal tally first, score column indicates score after each Stepanović goal.

List of international goals scored by Dragoslav Stepanović
No.	Date	Venue	Opponent	Score	Result	Competition
1	14 June 1972	Estádio Belfort Duarte, Curitiba, Brazil	Venezuela	7–0	10–0	Friendly

== Coaching career ==
Stepanović went on to become a successful football coach in Germany. He made a managerial name for himself in Germany with Eintracht Frankfurt before taking over at Bayer Leverkusen, replacing Reinhard Saftig shortly before they won the 1993 DFB-Pokal Final. He was then signed to coach Athletic Bilbao in July 1995. He did not last until the end of the season, however, getting replaced in mid-March 1996.

He was idolized in the US and finally came to Columbus, Ohio, in 2002 to coach the youth soccer club Blast FC. He has since returned to Germany, where he for a brief spell was team manager at TuS Koblenz.

In December 2006, Stepanović was a short-list candidate for the Bosnia-Herzegovina national team coaching spot, but the job went to Fuad Muzurović instead.

On 24 August 2007, Stepanović was named the head coach of Serbian SuperLiga club Čukarički. His appointment came two weeks into the 2007–08 season during which Čukarički already played the Serbian powerhouses Red Star Belgrade and Partizan, managing a draw and a loss respectively, On 8 December 2008, he was fired by Čukarički. During the summer 2009 off season on 8 June 2009, he was named FK Vojvodina head coach for the upcoming 2009–10 season but he was released on 2 October 2009.

During an interview in November 2025, former Bolton Wanderers and Paris Saint-Germain midfielder Jay-Jay Okocha described Stepanovic as the most influential coach of his playing career.

== Honours ==
=== Manager ===
==== Rot-Weiss Frankfurt ====
- Hessian Cup: 1988–89

==== Bayer Leverkusen ====
- DFB-Pokal: 1992–93
