= Sven Meyer (footballer) =

German footballer

Personal information
- Date of birth: 4 September 1970 (age 56)
- Place of birth: West Berlin, West Germany
- Positions: Defender; midfielder

Youth career
- Rapide Wedding
- Tennis Borussia Berlin
- Hertha BSC

Senior career*
Years	Team	Apps	(Gls)
1988–1993	Hertha BSC II		
1992–1996	Hertha BSC	70	(5)
1996–1998	Union Berlin	40	(5)
1998	Chengdu Wuniu		
1998–1999	SV Babelsberg 03	19	(0)
1999–2000	FC Bremerhaven	30	(2)
2000–2002	VfB Oldenburg	44	(5)
2002–2004	Tennis Borussia Berlin	64	(6)
2004–2009	Spandauer SV	113	(12)
2009–2013	Berliner Sport-Club	63	(5)
- * Club domestic league appearances and goals

Sven Meyer (born 4 September 1970) is a German former professional footballer who played as a defender or midfielder.

== Career ==
Meyer played as a youth for various clubs in West Berlin, ending up at Hertha BSC, where he progressed to the reserve team. He was part of the young Hertha reserve team that reached the 1992–93 DFB-Pokal final – the only reserve team to have done this – before losing 1–0 against Bayer 04 Leverkusen. Like many of that squad, he was given a chance in Hertha's first team, and made 70 appearances in the 2. Bundesliga.

In 1996, he moved across town, joining 1. FC Union Berlin, where he made 40 league appearances in the Regionalliga Nord, captaining a young side. In January 1998, he moved to China, one of the first German footballers to do so, signing for Chengdu Wuniu. Six months later he was back in Germany, joining SV Babelsberg of Potsdam. He later had spells with FC Bremerhaven and VfB Oldenburg before returning to Berlin in 2002, joining Tennis Borussia. He spent two years there, and five with Spandauer SV, and is still active in the Berlin-Liga, playing for Berliner Sport-Club. He also plays for Hertha's veterans' team.

Meyer played in a variety of defensive or midfield roles, and was commonly deployed as a sweeper.
