= Těšany =

- Municipality
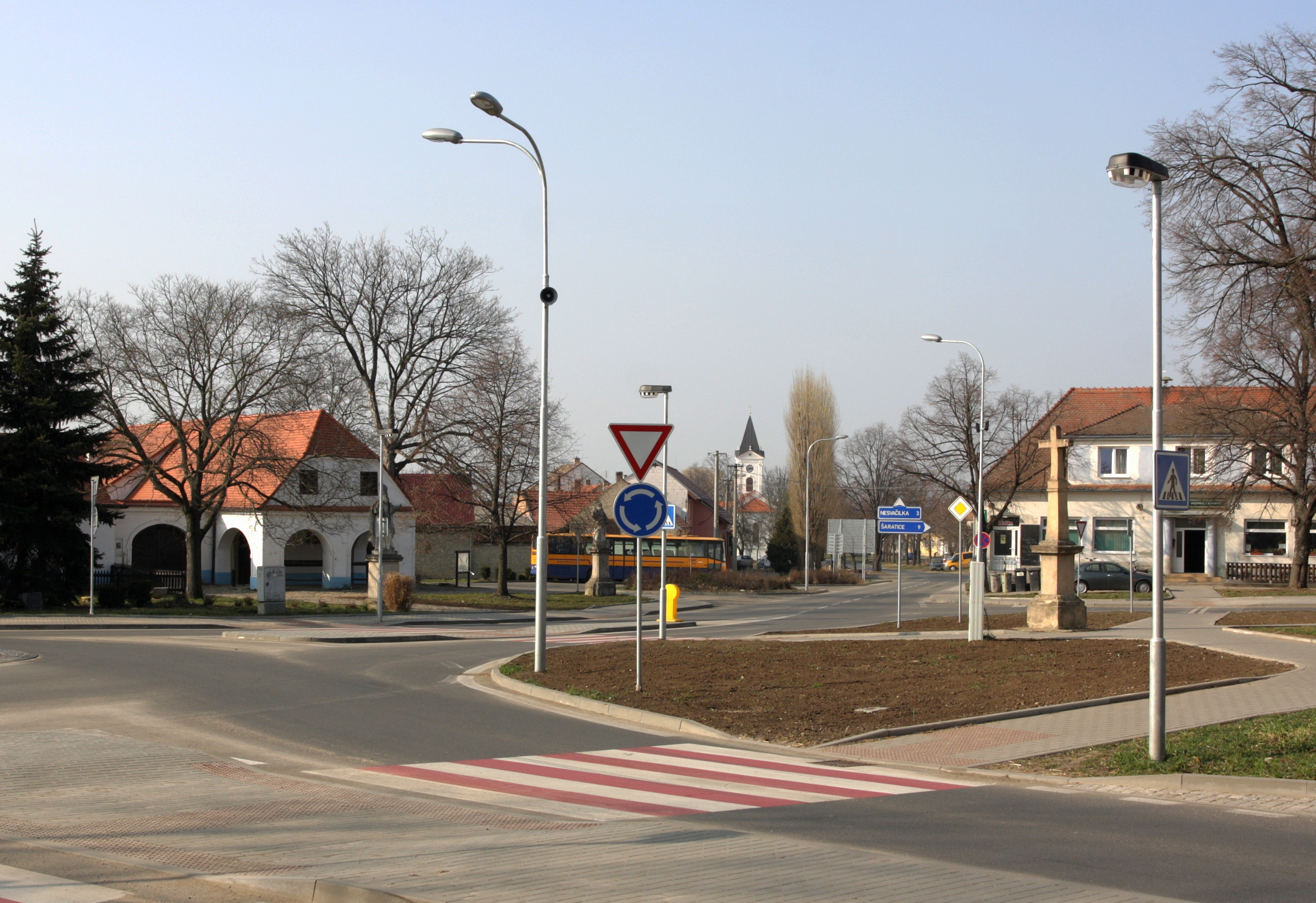
- Centre of Těšany

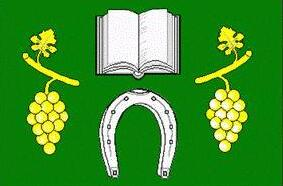
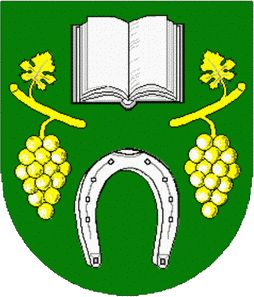
- Flag Coat of arms

- Location in the Czech Republic
- Coordinates: 49°2′22″N 16°46′12″E
- Country: Czech Republic
- Region: South Moravian
- District: Brno-Country
- First mentioned: 1131

Area
  - Total: 16.22 km^{2} (6.26 sq mi)
- Elevation: 203 m (666 ft)

Population (2026-01-01)
  - Total: 1,299
  - Density: 80.09/km^{2} (207.4/sq mi)
- Time zone: UTC+1 (CET)
  - Summer (DST): UTC+2 (CEST)
- Postal code: 664 54
- Website: www.outesany.cz

Těšany (German: Tieschan) is a municipality and village in Brno-Country District in the South Moravian Region of the Czech Republic. It has about 1,300 inhabitants.

== Geography ==
Těšany is located about 20 kilometres (12 mi) southeast of Brno. It lies in an agricultural landscape, on the border between the Dyje–Svratka Valley and Ždánice Forest range. The highest point is the hill Vinohrady at 339 m (1,112 ft) above sea level. The fishpond Těšany is situated on the eastern municipal border.

== History ==
The first written mention of Těšany is from 1131. The owners of Těšany changed often. Economic growth occurred in the 16th century and many fishponds were established around the village. From 1666 until its abolition in 1785, the village was owned by the Dominican monastery in Brno.

The proximity of Brno and the location on military roads often had unfortunate consequences for Těšany. During the Thirty Years' War (twice in 1619 and once in 1645), Těšany was burned down. The village was also damaged during the passage of Prussian troops in 1742 during the First Silesian War and was looted by the French army in 1805 during the Napoleonic Wars. The last major disaster was the passage of troops during the Austro-Prussian War in 1866.

== Demographics ==
Historical population

Year	Pop.	±%
1869	975	—
1880	1,020	+4.6%
1890	1,123	+10.1%
1900	1,114	−0.8%
1910	1,139	+2.2%

Year	Pop.	±%
1921	1,284	+12.7%
1930	1,302	+1.4%
1950	1,183	−9.1%
1961	1,272	+7.5%
1970	1,173	−7.8%

Year	Pop.	±%
1980	1,179	+0.5%
1991	1,148	−2.6%
2001	1,130	−1.6%
2011	1,231	+8.9%
2021	1,260	+2.4%

Source: Censuses

== Transport ==
There are no railways or major roads passing through the municipality.

== Sights ==
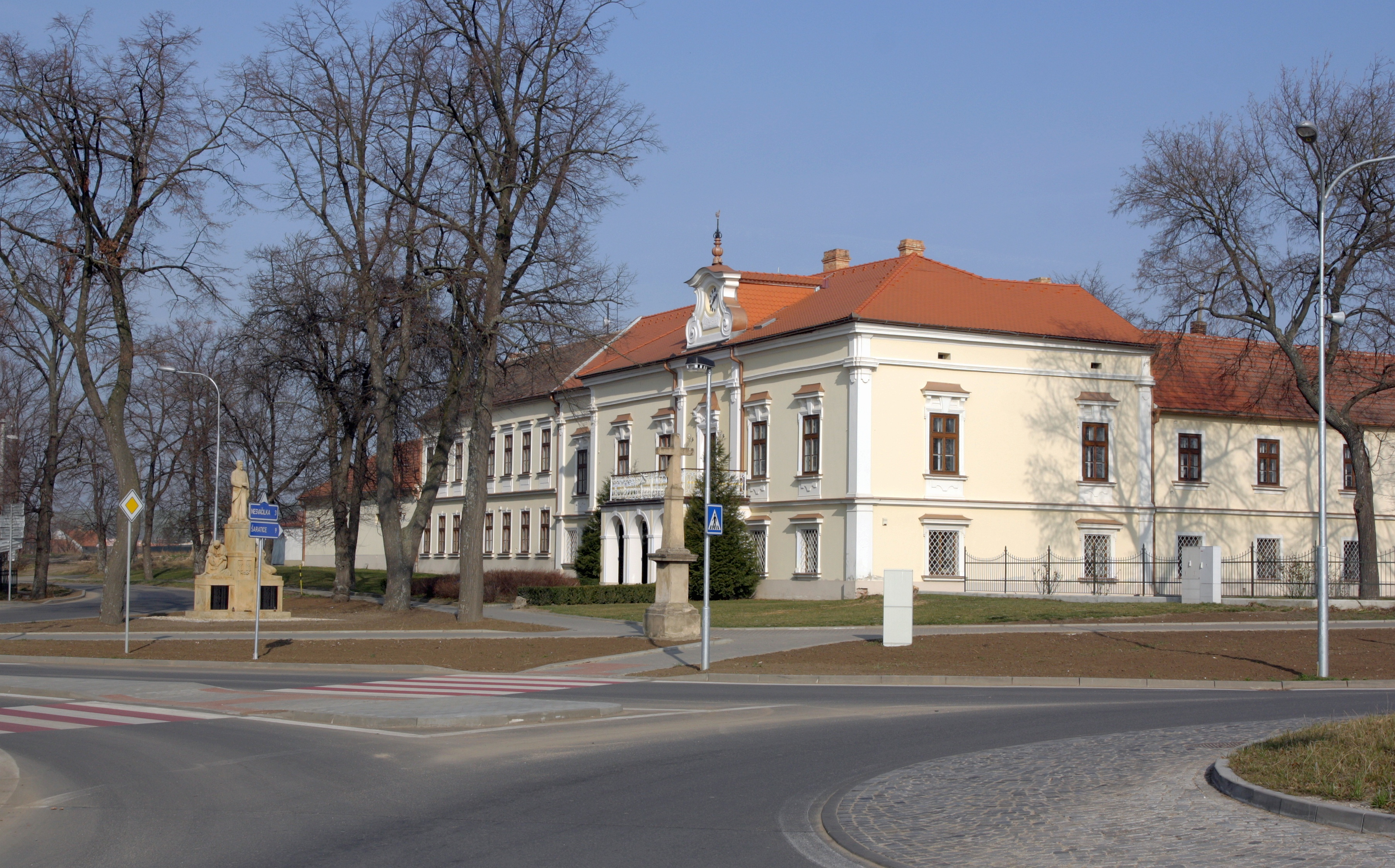
Těšany Castle

The most important monument is the Těšany Castle. It was built as a residence of the Dominicans in the second half of the 17th century. Today it is privately owned and inaccessible.

The second main landmark of Těšany is the Church of Saint Barnabas. It was built in the late Historicist style in 1896–1897 and constecrated in 1906 or 1907. However, it is not protected as a cultural monument.

The local Baroque forge is a valuable architectural and technical monument. It was built around 1700. Today the building houses two expositions, managed by the Technical Museum in Brno: the blacksmith's workroom and the wheelwright's shop.

Other cultural monuments in the municipality include Baroque statues of St. Dominic from 1717 and St. Gotthard from 1773, a stone Napoleonic cross from 1815, and the Monument to the Victims of World War I with a statue of Tomáš Garrigue Masaryk from 1938.

== Notable people ==
- Roman Sedláček (born 1963), football player and coach

== Twin towns – sister cities ==
Těšany is twinned with:

- Ruše, Slovenia
