= Andreas Schmidt (footballer) =

German footballer

Personal information
- Full name: Andreas Schmidt
- Date of birth: 14 September 1973 (age 53)
- Place of birth: Berlin, Germany
- Height: 1.82 m (6 ft 0 in)
- Position: Defensive midfielder

Senior career*
Years	Team	Apps	(Gls)
1991–1993	Hertha BSC II	59	(23)
1993–2008	Hertha BSC	275	(18)
2004–2008	Hertha BSC II	88	(8)
Total		422	(49)

International career
1995	Germany U-21	1	(0)
1999–2001	Germany B	4	(0)
- * Club domestic league appearances and goals

Andreas Schmidt (born 14 September 1973 in Berlin) is a German former professional footballer who spent his entire career with Hertha BSC. His twin brother, Oliver, also played for Hertha.

== Honours ==
Hertha Berlin

- DFL-Ligapokal: 2002
