= Ayhan Gezen =

Turkish-German footballer (born 1972)

Personal information
- Date of birth: 23 June 1972 (age 54)
- Place of birth: Istanbul, Turkey
- Positions: Midfielder; forward

Senior career*
Years	Team	Apps	(Gls)
1990–1996	Hertha BSC II		
1992–1994	→ Hertha BSC	14	(1)
1996–1999	FC Berlin	81	(8)
1999–2000	Rot-Weiß Erfurt	19	(3)
2000–2001	BFC Dynamo		
2001–2004	SV Altlüdersdorf		
2004–2006	Spandauer SV		
- * Club domestic league appearances and goals

Ayhan Gezen (born 23 June 1972) is a Turkish-German former footballer. He was part of the Hertha BSC reserve team who reached the 1993 DFB-Pokal final and made 14 appearances for Hertha's first team in the 2. Bundesliga.

Gezen played for BFC Dynamo from 1996 to 1999 and then again from 2000 to 2001. He scored one goal when BFC Dynamo defeated Berlin Türkspor 1965 4–1 in the final of the 1998-99 Berlin Cup at the Friedrich-Ludwig-Jahn-Sportpark on 11 May 1999 and captured its first Berlin Cup title.
