= Oliver Holzbecher =

German footballer (born 1970)

Personal information
- Date of birth: 25 September 1970 (age 56)
- Place of birth: West Germany
- Position: Forward

Youth career
- SC Staaken

Senior career*
Years	Team	Apps	(Gls)
1988–1995	Hertha BSC II		
1988–1995	Hertha BSC	10	(0)
1995–1998	Reinickendorfer Füchse	93	(9)
1998–2006	FC Spandau 06		

International career
- West Germany U-18
- * Club domestic league appearances and goals

Oliver Holzbecher (born 25 September 1970) is a German former footballer who played as a forward. Holzbecher was a West Germany youth international, and came through the youth team of Hertha BSC. He made his Hertha debut in the last game of the 1988–89 season, coming on as a 75th-minute substitute for Sven Kretschmer in a 1–0 defeat against Fortuna Köln. Over the next few years his appearances were restricted to Hertha's reserve team, where he was part of the team that reached the 1993 DFB-Pokal Final, losing 1–0 against Bayer Leverkusen. This gave him another chance at first-team action, and he made a further nine appearances in the 2. Bundesliga before leaving in 1995. He spent three years in the Regionalliga Nordost with Reinickendorfer Füchse, before playing out his career with an eight-year spell at Spandauer BC, who were renamed FC Spandau 06 in 2003. He retired in 2006.
