= Sven Kaiser =

German footballer (born 1973)

Personal information
- Date of birth: 27 August 1973 (age 53)
- Place of birth: Germany
- Height: 1.80 m (5 ft 11 in)
- Positions: Midfielder; forward

Youth career
- –1990: 1. FC Union Berlin

Senior career*
Years	Team	Apps	(Gls)
1990–1996	Hertha BSC II		
1992–1996	Hertha BSC	19	(1)
1996–1998	FC Sachsen Leipzig	74	(14)
1998–2000	Carl Zeiss Jena	47	(6)
2000–2005	SV Lichtenberg 47		
- * Club domestic league appearances and goals

Sven Kaiser (born 27 August 1973) is a German former footballer. He was part of the Hertha BSC reserve team who reached the 1992–93 DFB-Pokal Final and made 19 appearances for Hertha's first team in the 2. Bundesliga.
