= Gerald Klews =

German footballer

Personal information
- Date of birth: 4 April 1972 (age 54)
- Place of birth: Germany
- Height: 1.70 m (5 ft 7 in)
- Position: Right wing-back

Youth career
- Westend 01 Berlin
- SC Siemensstadt

Senior career*
Years	Team	Apps	(Gls)
1991–1992	Hamburger SV II		
1992–1993	Hertha BSC II		
1992–1995	Hertha BSC	57	(1)
1995–1997	1. FC Union Berlin	62	(6)
1997–1999	Energie Cottbus	26	(0)
1999	SV Babelsberg 03	10	(1)
1999–2000	VfB Oldenburg	17	(2)
2000–2001	Holstein Kiel		
2001–2002	VfL Halle 96		
2002	Berliner AK	7	(0)
2002–2004	FC Lausitz Hoyerswerda		
2004–2005	SC Gatow		
2005	1. FC Wilmersdorf		

Managerial career
- 2002–2004: FC Lausitz Hoyerswerda
- * Club domestic league appearances and goals

Gerald Klews (born 4 April 1972) is a German former footballer.

== Career ==
Klews began his career at youth level with various clubs in West Berlin, before joining Hamburger SV, where he played for the reserve team. He returned to Berlin in 1992, joining Hertha BSC, where he made 57 appearances in the 2. Bundesliga over three years, mostly as a substitute. In his first season, he was also involved in Hertha's reserve team, who reached the DFB-Pokal final, losing 1–0 to Bayer Leverkusen.

In 1995, Klews moved across town, to join Union Berlin, playing in the Regionalliga Nordost for two years, before returning to the second level in 1997, joining Energie Cottbus. He was a regular in the first team in his first year, but only made two appearances in the first half of the following season, and left in January 1999, joining SV Babelsberg. After six months, he moved west, spending a year at each VfB Oldenburg and Holstein Kiel. He ended his career with spells at various clubs in the northeastern region.
