= Filip Brekalo (footballer, born 2003) =

Croatian footballer

Personal information
- Date of birth: 20 January 2003 (age 23)
- Place of birth: Zagreb, Croatia
- Height: 1.84 m (6 ft 0 in)
- Position: Defender

Team information
- Current team: Hertha BSC II
- Number: 20

Youth career
- 2010–2021: Dinamo

Senior career*
Years	Team	Apps	(Gls)
2021–2024	Dinamo	0	(0)
2021–2022	→ Dinamo II (loan)	26	(0)
2022	→ Varaždin (loan)	6	(0)
2023	→ Gorica (loan)	14	(0)
2024	→ Zrinjski (loan)	4	(0)
2024–2025	Reggiana	0	(0)
2025–2026	Karlovac 1919	2	(0)
2026	→ Dubrava (loan)	6	(0)
2026–	Hertha BSC II	10	(0)

International career^{‡}
2017	Croatia U14	2	(0)
2017–2018	Croatia U15	10	(0)
2018–2019	Croatia U16	10	(0)
2019	Croatia U17	8	(0)
2021	Croatia U19	5	(0)
- * Club domestic league appearances and goals as of 23 September 2026 ‡ National team caps and goals as of 12 October 2021

Filip Brekalo (born 20 January 2003) is a Croatian footballer who plays as a defender for German Regionalliga Nordost club Hertha BSC II.

== Early life ==
As a youth player, Brekalo joined the youth academy of Croatian side Dinamo. He was regarded as one of the club's most important players.

== Club career ==
Brekalo started his career with Croatian side Dinamo.

On 11 July 2024, Brekalo signed with Reggiana in Italy for one season, with an option for a second year. A week later, Reggiana announced that Brekalo will spend undetermined time away from the field due to a knee injury. He made his only bench appearance in the last game of the 2024–25 Serie B season.

== International career ==
Brekalo is a Croatia youth international. He played for the Croatia national under-17 football team for 2019 UEFA European Under-17 Championship qualification.

== Personal life ==
Brekalo was born in 2003 in Croatia. He is the younger brother of Croatia international Josip Brekalo.
