= SpVgg Plattling =

German football club

- Full name: Spielvereinigung Plattling von 1919 e.V.
- Founded: 1919
- Ground: Rennbahnstadion
- Capacity: 7,000
- Manager: Christian Dullinger
- League: Kreisliga 1 Straubing (VIII)
- 2022–23: 3rd
| Home colours | Away colours |

The SpVgg Plattling is a German association football club from the town of Plattling, Bavaria.

From 1950 onwards, the club has played for many seasons in the third division Fußball-Bayernliga, the last time in 1994. The club spent all 24 seasons at this level and was promoted to the league on six occasions. When not playing in the Bayernliga, Plattling spent most of its time after 1963 in the Landesliga Bayern-Mitte but was relegated from this league, too in 1995 and has since not been able to return to this level. The club has also qualified for the German Cup on four occasions, reaching the third round in 1992–93 as its best result.

== History ==
The SpVgg Plattling was formed after the First World War in 1919 and played in the lower Bavarian amateur leagues for the first three decades, interrupted by the Second World War, when the club was unable to field a team because of a lack of players caused by the war. Plattling was able to restart its football team in September 1945 and entered a more successful era.

Plattling first made an appearance on Bavarian state level in 1950, when it won its league and finished first out of six teams in the promotion round and gained entry to the Amateurliga Bayern. As a newcomer, the team lasted for only one season at this level, suffering immediate relegation.

The team won the 2nd Amateurliga Lower Bavaria the following year and was once more successful in the promotion round, making a more permanent return to the Bayernliga in 1952. After a ninth place in 1953, the league was split and Plattling became part of the southern division.

The next ten seasons in this league saw mixed results, dropping as low as 13th in 1959 but also climbing to second spot in 1962. In 1956, the team was only one point away from the championship, the year after only one point from relegation. A fourth place in 1963 was enough to qualify the team for the reunified Bavarian league the following year.

The first three seasons in the new league, Plattling finished just above the three relegation ranks but in 1967 it came last and had to drop down to the tier-four Landesliga Bayern-Mitte. After three years in the Landesliga, the club even briefly dropped to Bezirksliga level but recovered immediately, took out the Landesliga championship in 1976 and returned to the Bayernliga. To do so however, the team had to play-off with runners-up SpVgg Vohenstrauß, the two sides being on equal points, with Plattling winning the replay 3–0 after the first game had ended in a draw.

The side now became an elevator team, lasting two seasons in the Bayernliga and spending another seven in the Landesliga. In 1985, as the leagues runner-up, Plattling qualified for the promotion round, where it beat VfB Helmbrechts in extra time, followed by a victory over TSV Eching, with both teams going up after SpVgg Bayreuth achieved second Bundesliga promotion. Again the side did not last long in the Bayernliga, three seasons, with the middle one yielding a respectable fifth-place finish. In 1985, the side also made its first German Cup appearance, where it reached the second round after a home win over Itzehoer SV, going out 0–2 to Bayer 04 Leverkusen.

Another Landesliga championship in 1988–89 brought the club an immediate return to the league and another three seasons there. In 1989, it once more reached the first round of the cup, losing 1–2 at home to Fortuna Düsseldorf. The club achieved its sixth, and to this date last promotion to the Bayernliga in 1993, after its third Landesliga title. The 1992–93 season also brought the team's best-ever cup performance, receiving a bye for the first round, beating fellow Bavarian side Jahn Regensburg 2–1 in the second round before eventually losing 1–3 in the third round to FC Carl Zeiss Jena. The sides Bayernliga performance in its last season, 1993–94, was abysmal, finishing last in a season that saw only one team relegated because of the introduction of the Regionalliga Süd. Plattling won four games, drew four and lost 24 that season. It fared slightly better in the cup that season, beating 1. FSV Mainz 05 4–3 before a second round exit against Borussia Mönchengladbach.

The side's bad form continued in the Landesliga, where it finished 16th in 1995 and was relegated to the tier-six Bezirksoberliga Niederbayern, to make a permanent exit from the Landesliga, too. Things took a turn for the worse for the club in the following season. In 1995–96, on the Bezirksoberliga, the side lost all 30 games and conceded an incredible 179 goals while only scoring seven themselves, resulting in the third relegation in a row. Plattling, having lost almost a complete team, was only able to field a side through the help of their over-40 team and a number of local Turkish players. Financially, the club came close to having to declare insolvency at the time.

After three successive drops, the club managed to break the fall in the tier-seven Bezirksliga Niederbayern-West in 1996–97, finishing ninth. At this level, it competed for a number of seasons against local rival Kickers Plattling until 2001, when SpVgg won promotion back to the Bezirksoberliga while Kickers were relegated. Plattling spent three seasons at Bezirksoberliga level before dropping down once more in 2004, after losing almost a complete team once again, and once again having to rely on the club's "oldies". It took the club seven seasons, in which mostly mid-table finishes were achieved, before it returned once again to the Bezirksoberliga in 2011.

At the end of the 2011–12 season the club qualified directly for the newly expanded Landesliga after finishing fifth in the Bezirksoberliga.

The club lasted for only one season in the Landesliga, being relegated straight back to the Bezirksliga.

== Honours ==
The club's honours:

=== League ===
- Amateurliga Bayern South
  - Runners-up: 1962
- 2nd Amateurliga Lower Bavaria
  - Champions: 1952
- Landesliga Bayern-Mitte
  - Champions: (3) 1976, 1989, 1993
  - Runners-up: (2) 1974, 1985
- Bezirksliga Niederbayern-West
  - Runners-up: (2) 2001, 2011

== Recent seasons ==
The recent season-by-season performance of the club:

| Season | Division | Tier | Position |
|---|---|---|---|
| 1999–2000 | Bezirksliga Niederbayern-West | VII | 6th |
| 2000–01 | Bezirksliga Niederbayern-West | VII | 2nd ↑ |
| 2001–02 | Bezirksoberliga Niederbayern | VI | 4th |
| 2002–03 | Bezirksoberliga Niederbayern | VI | 6th |
| 2003–04 | Bezirksoberliga Niederbayern | VI | 16th ↓ |
| 2004–05 | Bezirksliga Niederbayern-West | VII | 6th |
| 2005–06 | Bezirksliga Niederbayern-West | VII | 8th |
| 2006–07 | Bezirksliga Niederbayern-West | VII | 6th |
| 2007–08 | Bezirksliga Niederbayern-West | VII | 5th |
| 2008–09 | Bezirksliga Niederbayern-West | VIII | 7th |
| 2009–10 | Bezirksliga Niederbayern-West | VIII | 3rd |
| 2010–11 | Bezirksliga Niederbayern-West | VIII | 2nd ↑ |
| 2011–12 | Bezirksoberliga Niederbayern | VII | 5th ↑ |
| 2012–13 | Landesliga Bayern-Südost | VI | 16th ↓ |
| 2013–14 | Bezirksliga Niederbayern-West | VII | 3rd |
| 2014–15 | Bezirksliga Niederbayern-West | VII | 6th |
| 2015–16 | Bezirksliga Niederbayern-West | VII | 10th |
| 2016–17 | Bezirksliga Niederbayern-West | VII | 12th |
| 2017–18 | Bezirksliga Niederbayern-Ost | VII | 6th |
| 2018–19 | Bezirksliga Niederbayern-Ost | VII | 11th |
| 2019–20 | Bezirksliga Niederbayern-Ost | VII | 13th |
| 2021–22 | Bezirksliga Niederbayern-West | VII | 16th ↓ |
| 2022–23 | Kreisliga 1 Straubing | | 3rd |

- With the introduction of the Bezirksoberligas in 1988 as the new fifth tier, below the Landesligas, all leagues below dropped one tier. With the introduction of the Regionalligas in 1994 and the 3. Liga in 2008 as the new third tier, below the 2. Bundesliga, all leagues below dropped one tier. With the establishment of the Regionalliga Bayern as the new fourth tier in Bavaria in 2012 the Bayernliga was split into a northern and a southern division, the number of Landesligas expanded from three to five and the Bezirksoberligas abolished. All leagues from the Bezirksligas onwards were elevated one tier.

| ↑ Promoted | ↓ Relegated |

== DFB Cup appearances ==
The club has qualified for the first round of the German Cup on three occasions:

| Season | Round | Date | Home | Away | Result | Attendance |
|---|---|---|---|---|---|---|
| 1985–86 DFB-Pokal | First round | 24 August 1985 | SpVgg Plattling | Itzehoer SV | 2–0 | |
| 1985–86 DFB-Pokal | Second round | 19 October 1985 | SpVgg Plattling | Bayer Leverkusen | 0–1 | |
| 1989–90 DFB-Pokal | First round | 20 August 1989 | SpVgg Plattling | Fortuna Düsseldorf | 1–2 | |
| 1992–93 DFB-Pokal | First round | bye | | | | |
| 1992–93 DFB-Pokal | Second round | 12 September 1992 | SpVgg Plattling | Jahn Regensburg | 2–1 | |
| 1992–93 DFB-Pokal | Third round | 10 October 1992 | SpVgg Plattling | FC Carl Zeiss Jena | 1–3 | |
| 1993–94 DFB-Pokal | First round | 1 August 1993 | SpVgg Plattling | 1. FSV Mainz 05 | 4–3 | |
| 1993–94 DFB-Pokal | Second round | 24 August 1993 | SpVgg Plattling | Borussia Mönchengladbach | 0–3 | |
