= Jürgen Kramny =

German footballer (born 1971)

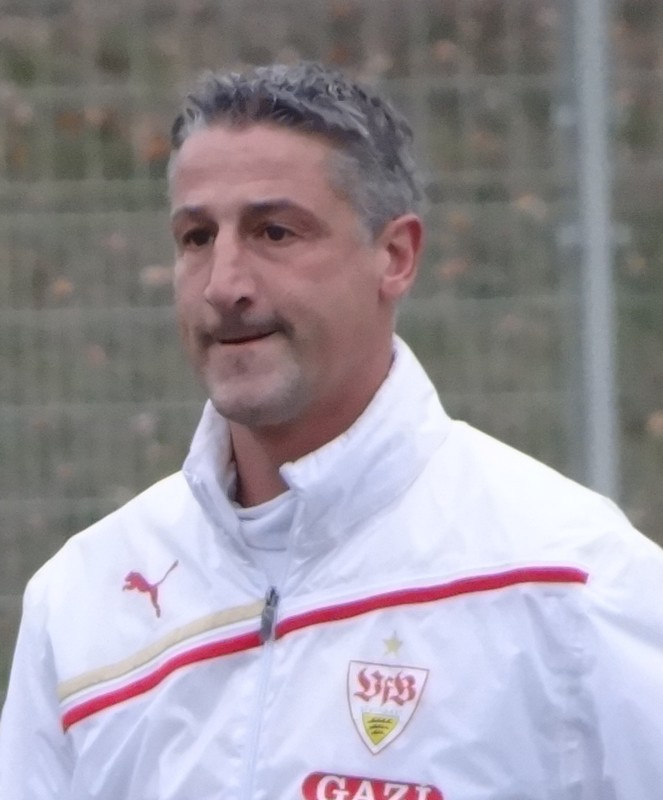
- Kramny as coach of VfB Stuttgart II

Personal information
- Date of birth: 18 October 1971 (age 55)
- Place of birth: Ludwigsburg, West Germany
- Height: 1.82 m (6 ft 0 in)
- Position: Midfielder

Youth career
- SpVgg Ludwigsburg

Senior career*
Years	Team	Apps	(Gls)
1990–1992	VfB Stuttgart	14	(0)
1992–1995	1. FC Nürnberg	65	(6)
1995–1997	1. FC Saarbrücken	66	(8)
1997–2005	Mainz 05	218	(30)
2005–2006	Darmstadt 98	15	(1)
2006	Mainz 05 II	11	(0)
Total		389	(45)

Managerial career
- 2011–2015: VfB Stuttgart II
- 2015–2016: VfB Stuttgart
- 2016–2017: Arminia Bielefeld
- * Club domestic league appearances and goals

Jürgen Kramny (born 18 October 1971) is a German football coach and a former player who most recently managed Arminia Bielefeld. He spent five seasons in the Bundesliga as a player with VfB Stuttgart, 1. FC Nürnberg and Mainz 05.

== Coaching career ==
=== Early career ===
In July 2010, Kramny became manager of the under-19 team of VfB Stuttgart. From 13 October 2010 to 12 December 2010 he worked with the new head coach of the first team Jens Keller as assistant coach. After the sacking of Keller, Kramny returned as head coach to the under-19 team of VfB Stuttgart.

=== VfB Stuttgart II ===
On 17 May 2011, Kramny was appointed as head coach of VfB Stuttgart II In his first season, the team finished in 11th place. The following season, the reserve team finished in 14th place. In the 2013–14 season, the team finished in 15th place. In the 2014–15 season, Stuttgart II finished in 13th place. He finished with a record of 52 wins, 46 draws, and 71 losses. During the 2015–16 season, Kramny was appointed as the interim head coach of the first team on 24 November 2015. His final match was a 3–1 loss to Holstein Kiel on 20 November 2015. Stuttgart II was in 18th place and fighting relegation when he took over the first team.

=== VfB Stuttgart ===
Kramny was appointed as the interim head coach on 24 November 2015. His first match in–charge finished in a 4–1 loss to Borussia Dortmund. On 20 December 2015, Kramny was named as permanent head coach of VfB Stuttgart. The permanent job came the day after a 3–1 win against VfL Wolfsburg. Stuttgart were relegated after losing 3–1 to Wolfsburg on 14 May 2016. Kramny was dismissed from the first team on 15 May 2016. He finished with a record of seven wins, five draws, and 11 losses. In June 2016 VfB Stuttgart announced that Kramny also would not return to the second team and would not work for VfB Stuttgart anymore.

=== Arminia Bielefeld ===
Kramny was named the head coach of Arminia Bielefeld on 15 November 2016. On 14 March 2017, he was sacked.

== Coaching record ==
As of 15 March 2017

Team	From	To	Record								
Team	From	To	M	W	D	L	GF	GA	GD	Win %	Ref.
VfB Stuttgart II	17 May 2011	24 November 2015	169	52	46	71	193	231	−38	30.77	
VfB Stuttgart	24 November 2015	15 May 2016	23	7	5	11	35	48	−13	30.43	
Arminia Bielefeld	15 November 2016	14 March 2017	14	4	3	7	23	27	−4	28.57	
Total			206	63	54	89	251	306	−55	30.58	—

== Honours ==
VfB Stuttgart

- Bundesliga: 1991–92
