= Roman Grill =

German footballer

Personal information
- Date of birth: March 1, 1966 (age 60)
- Place of birth: West Germany
- Position: Defender

Youth career
- SG Hausham 01
- –1988: FC Miesbach

Senior career*
| Years | Team | Apps | (Gls) |
| 1988–1999 | Bayern Munich (A) | | |
| 1995–1996 | → Bayern Munich | 0 | (0) |
- * Club domestic league appearances and goals

Roman Grill (born March 1, 1966) is a German former footballer who is now a player agent. A defender, Grill spent eleven years playing for Bayern Munich's reserve team, and made one first-team appearance, replacing Thomas Helmer in a UEFA Cup match against Benfica in December 1995. Bayern went on to win the competition that season. After retiring, Grill worked as a coach with Bayern's youth team, before starting his own player agency in 2006. His clients include Owen Hargreaves, Philipp Lahm and Piotr Trochowski.
