= Axel Jüptner =

German footballer (1969–1998)

Personal information
- Date of birth: 26 April 1969
- Place of birth: Gemmrigheim, West Germany
- Date of death: 24 April 1998 (aged 28)
- Place of death: Bad Oeynhausen, Germany
- Position: Midfielder

Youth career
- –1986: VfL Gemmrigheim
- 1986–1987: VfB Stuttgart

Senior career*
Years	Team	Apps	(Gls)
1987–1989	VfB Stuttgart II		
1988–1991	VfB Stuttgart	25	(0)
1991–1997	Bayer Uerdingen	181	(8)
1997–1998	Carl Zeiss Jena	13	(2)
- * Club domestic league appearances and goals

Axel Jüptner (26 April 1969 – 24 April 1998) was a German professional footballer who played as a midfielder.

Jüptner played in the Bundesliga for VfB Stuttgart between 1988 and 1991. In 1991, he joined KFC Uerdingen 05 and helped win promotion to the Bundesliga the same year. He played for Uerdingen until November 1997, when he transferred to Carl Zeiss Jena. On 23 April 1998, during a training session in Jena, he suffered from myocardial infarction and died one day later.
