= Werner Protzel =

German footballer

Personal information
- Date of birth: 5 October 1973 (age 53)
- Place of birth: Rosenheim, West Germany
- Height: 1.73 m (5 ft 8 in)
- Position: Central midfielder

Team information
- Current team: VfB Gartenstadt

Youth career
- SV Tattenhausen
- –1992: Bayern Munich

Senior career*
Years	Team	Apps	(Gls)
1992–1997	Bayern Munich (A)		
1997–2001	SV Waldhof Mannheim	110	(19)
2001–2003	Stuttgarter Kickers	29	(1)
2003–2004	SV Weingarten	32	(6)
2004–2005	SV Sandhausen		
2005–2006	FSV Oggersheim		
2006–2009	VfB Leimen		
2009–	VfB Gartenstadt		

International career
- Germany U-20
- * Club domestic league appearances and goals

Werner Protzel (born 5 October 1973) is a German footballer.
