= Roman Sedláček =

Czech footballer and coach

Personal information
- Date of birth: 12 February 1963 (age 63)
- Place of birth: Těšany, Czechoslovakia
- Position: Striker

Youth career
- Sokol Těšany
- KS Brno

Senior career*
Years	Team	Apps	(Gls)
1982–1984	Dukla Prague		
1984–1985	TJ Vítkovice	8	(0)
1986	TJ Gottwaldov		
1986–1991	SK Sigma Olomouc	124	(5)
1991–1992	FC Hansa Rostock	24	(4)
1992–1993	FC Remscheid	18	(3)
1993–1994	Eintracht Braunschweig		
1994	FC Neubrandenburg		
1994	FK Jablonec	5	(0)
1995	Svit Zlín	16	(0)
1999–2002	1. HFK Olomouc		

International career
1990–1991	Czechoslovakia	5	(0)

Managerial career
- 2005–2007: 1. HFK Olomouc B
- 2007–2008: 1. HFK Olomouc
- 2008–2009: Sokol Konice
- * Club domestic league appearances and goals

Roman Sedláček (born 12 February 1963 in Těšany) is a Czech football coach and a former player. He played for his country five times between 1990 and 1991. Besides Czech Republic, he has played in Germany.
