= Frank Siersleben =

German footballer (born 1960)

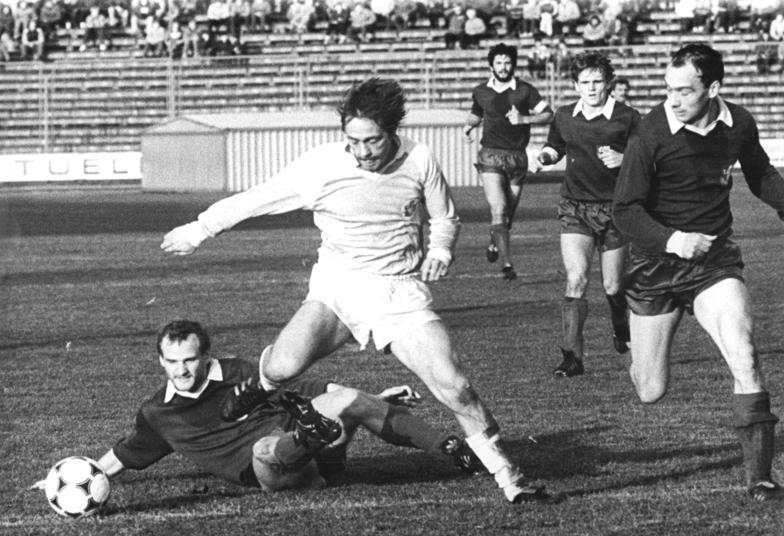
- Siersleben (left, on the ground) in 1986

Personal information
- Date of birth: 8 December 1960 (age 65)
- Place of birth: East Germany
- Position: Left back

Youth career
- 1974–1983: 1. FC Magdeburg

Senior career*
| Years | Team | Apps | (Gls) |
| 1980–1994 | 1. FC Magdeburg | 299 | (12) |
| 1994–1999 | Fortuna Magdeburg | | |
| 1999–2000 | MSV Börde | | |

International career
| | East Germany U19 | 19 | |
| | East Germany U21 | 4 | |

Managerial career
- 2000–2003: MSV Börde
- 2003–2008: 1. FC Magdeburg II
- * Club domestic league appearances and goals

Frank Siersleben (born 8 December 1960) is a German former football player and manager. He spent the majority of his career with 1. FC Magdeburg playing in the DDR-Oberliga, East Germany's top flight, and won 23 caps for East Germany youth national teams.

== Playing career ==
Siersleben joined the 1. FC Magdeburg youth team in 1974. As a youth he won 19 caps for the East German youth national teams, later winning another four for the U21 team. In 1978, he was nominated as a defender for the Nachwuchsoberliga (a youth competition) side. At age 18 he was made part of the DDR-Oberliga squad for the 1979–80 DDR-Oberliga season, playing in his first match on 25 August 1979 as a leftback against BSG Chemie Leipzig. During his first Oberliga season he played in ten matches. In the following season Siersleben played in the Nachwuchsoberliga exclusively, having begun studying for a Diplomsportlehrer degree in 1980. Only in the 1983–84 DDR-Oberliga season could he establish himself in the Oberliga squad, playing in 16 matches.

Siersleben played six matches on European level for 1. FC Magdeburg. His first match came in the First Round of the 1986–87 UEFA Cup against Athletic Bilbao on 17 September 1986. He played in the return leg as well. In the 1990-91 season he played in four more UEFA Cup matches, the last in the history of the club.

From 1984 onwards Siersleben was an Oberliga regular, never playing in less than 20 matches per season until the end of the DDR-Oberliga in 1991. After his club had missed out on qualifying for the 2. Bundesliga in 1991, Siersleben spent three seasons in the then third-tier NOFV-Oberliga until 1994. In this division he played in 98 league matches, no longer as a defender, but as a midfielder. In his final season with the club, Siersleben was made team captain. After the Saxony-Anhalt Cup final against Hallescher FC, he ended his career with 1. FC Magdeburg. All in all he had played in 299 league matches, 42 national cup matches and 6 UEFA Cup matches. Aside from his 12 league goals, Siersleben scored twice in the national cup competitions.

When 1. FC Magdeburg did not qualify for the new Regionalliga Nordost in 1994, Siersleben followed former teammate Rolf Döbbelin who was now manager of Fortuna Magdeburg. With Fortuna he won promotion to the fourth-tier NOFV-Oberliga. He stayed at Fortuna until 1999, leaving for lower league side MSV Börde where he ended his playing career in 2000.

== Managerial career ==
After ending his playing career, Siersleben took over the manager position at his last club MSV Börde. In 2003, he moved back to 1. FC Magdeburg where he led the reserve team from the then eight-tier Stadtklasse to the then fifth-tier Verbandsliga within four years. After internal differences he was let go in April 2008.
