= Sven Backhaus =

German footballer

Personal information
- Date of birth: 1 June 1968 (age 58)
- Height: 1.83 m (6 ft 0 in)
- Position: Defender

Senior career*
Years	Team	Apps	(Gls)
1986–1990	Fortuna Düsseldorf	71	(8)
1990–1991	Energie Cottbus	8	(0)
1991–1995	Fortuna Düsseldorf		
1995–1996	SG Wattenscheid 09	19	(0)
1996–1997	Admira Wacker	22	(1)
1997–1999	Wuppertaler SV		
1999–2001	Rot-Weiß Oberhausen	36	(2)
- * Club domestic league appearances and goals

Sven Backhaus (born 1 June 1968) is a German former professional footballer who played as a defender.
