= Paulo Sérgio =

Paulo Sérgio is a Portuguese given name. It may refer to:

== Given names ==
- Paulo Sérgio (footballer, born 1954), Brazilian footballer
- Paulo Sérgio (footballer, born 1968), Portuguese footballer and coach
- Paulo Sérgio (footballer, born April 1969), Brazilian footballer
- Paulo Sérgio (footballer, born June 1969), Brazilian footballer, 1994 World Champion
- Paulo Sérgio (footballer, born 1971), Portuguese footballer
- Paulo Sérgio (footballer, born 1972), Brazilian footballer
- Paulo Sérgio (footballer, born 1974), Brazilian footballer
- Paulo Sérgio (footballer, born 1981), Brazilian footballer
- Paulo Sérgio (footballer, born 1984), Portuguese footballer
- Paulo Sérgio (footballer, born 1989), Brazilian footballer

=== Other people ===
- Paulo Sérgio Rosa (born 1969), usually known as Viola, 1994 World Champion
- Paulo Sérgio de Oliveira Silva, usually known as Serginho (1974-2004), Brazilian footballer
- Paulo Sérgio Betanin (born 1986), usually known as Paulinho, Brazilian footballer
- Sérgio Paulo Barbosa Valente (born 1980), nicknamed Duda, Portuguese footballer

== See also ==
- Paulo
- Sérgio
- Serginho (disambiguation)
