= Michael Hecht (footballer) =

German footballer (born 1965)

Personal information
- Date of birth: 27 April 1965 (age 61)
- Place of birth: Munich, West Germany
- Height: 1.87 m (6 ft 2 in)
- Position: Defender

Senior career*
Years	Team	Apps	(Gls)
1982–1984	1860 Munich	19	(2)
1984–1985	SpVgg Unterhaching	15	(0)
1985–1989	Wacker Munich		
1989–1990	SpVgg Weiden	30	(1)
1990–1991	Bayern Munich (A)	26	(2)
1990–1991	Bayern Munich	0	(0)
1991–1992	1860 Munich	23	(1)
1992–1993	SpVgg Weiden	13	(1)
1993–1995	FC Augsburg	53	(4)
1995–1996	Dynamo Dresden	28	(5)
1996–1997	SpVgg Greuther Fürth	10	(0)
1997–1998	SG Quelle Fürth	15	(0)
1998–1999	Würzburger Kickers		
Medal record
Bayern Munich
Winner	DFB-Supercup	1990
- * Club domestic league appearances and goals

Michael Hecht (born 27 April 1965) is a German former football player.
