= Oliver Schmidt (footballer) =

German footballer

Personal information
- Date of birth: 14 September 1973 (age 53)
- Place of birth: West Berlin, West Germany
- Position: Defender

Youth career
- SC Siemensstadt

Senior career*
Years	Team	Apps	(Gls)
1991–1993	Hertha BSC II	42	(5)
1992–1998	Hertha BSC	115	(1)
1998–2000	Greuther Fürh	29	(1)
2000–2002	VfR Mannheim	46	(5)
2002–2004	Jahn Regensburg	41	(2)
2004–2006	FC Augsburg	48	(0)
2006–2007	FC Ingolstadt	31	(0)
Total		452	(14)

International career
1994–1996	Germany U-21	13	(0)
- * Club domestic league appearances and goals

Oliver Schmidt (born 14 September 1973) is a German former footballer. He began his career with Hertha BSC, alongside his twin brother Andreas. Together they were part of the Hertha reserve team that reached the final of the DFB-Pokal in 1993. Oliver Schmidt left Hertha in 1998, one year after the club had achieved promotion to the Bundesliga. He played for five more clubs before retiring in 2007.
