= Ante Čović (Croatian footballer) =

Croatian-German footballer and manager

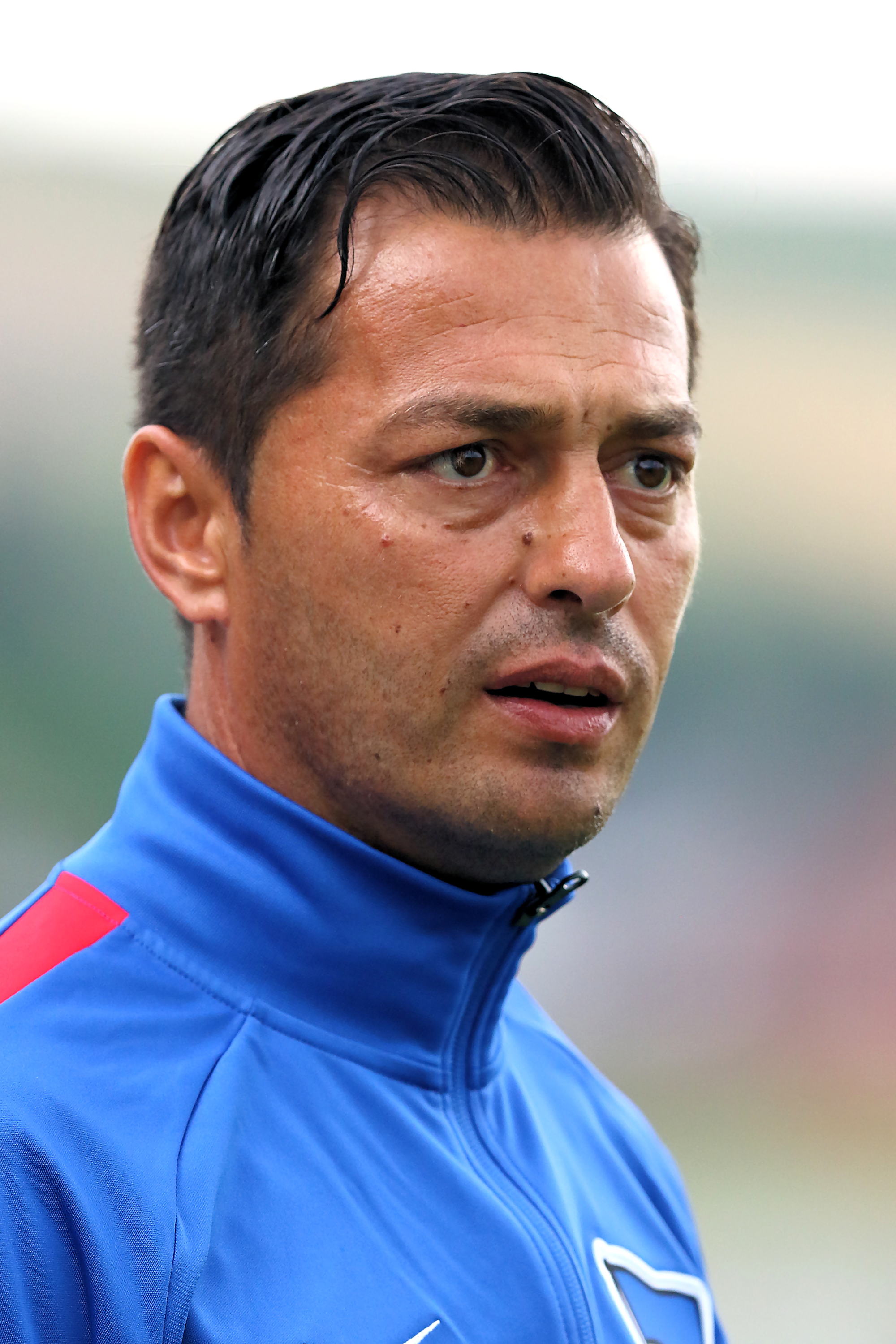
- Čović as manager of Hertha BSC in 2019

Personal information
- Date of birth: 31 August 1975 (age 51)
- Place of birth: Berlin, West Germany
- Height: 1.80 m (5 ft 11 in)
- Position: Midfielder

Team information
- Current team: Hertha BSC II (head coach)

Youth career
- 1988–1991: Hajduk Split
- 1991–1992: Hertha BSC
- 1992–1994: VfB Stuttgart

Senior career*
Years	Team	Apps	(Gls)
1994–1995	VfB Stuttgart	13	(2)
1995–1996	1. FC Nürnberg	24	(1)
1996–2000	Hertha BSC	72	(8)
2000–2001	VfL Bochum	5	(0)
2001–2002	1. FC Saarbrücken	20	(2)
2003–2010	Hertha BSC II	108	(9)
Total		242	(22)

International career
1995–1997	Croatia U21	7	(1)

Managerial career
- 2013–2019: Hertha BSC II
- 2019: Hertha BSC
- 2021–: Hertha BSC II
- * Club domestic league appearances and goals

Ante Čović (born 31 August 1975) is a Croatian-German professional football manager and former player who was most recently the manager of Bundesliga club Hertha BSC.

== Managerial career ==
=== Hertha BSC II ===
Čović was head coach of Hertha BSC's U–19 team until 21 November 2013. At this point, he became head coach of Hertha BSC II. His first match at the helm was a 5–2 win against SV Babelsberg 03 on 24 November 2013. Hertha BSC II finished the 2013–14 season in 12th place, three spots above the relegation zone. Then Hertha BSC II started the 2014–15 season with a 1–0 loss against Budissa Bautzen. The first win of the season was a 3–0 victory on matchday three in a Berlin derby against Dynamo Berlin.

=== Hertha BSC ===
He was appointed head coach of the first team on 1 July 2019. On 27 November 2019, Čović and Hertha BSC agreed to terminate his contract following poor results, with the side languishing in 15th place. He was replaced by Jürgen Klinsmann.

== Personal life ==
His sons Maurice and Patrice are both footballers, with Patrice playing professionally for Werder Bremen

== Managerial statistics ==
As of match played 24 November 2019

Managerial record by team and tenure
Team	From	To	Record								Ref.
Team	From	To	P	W	D	L	GF	GA	GD	Win %	Ref.
Hertha BSC II	21 November 2013	1 July 2019	181	74	49	58	288	256	+32	40.88	
Hertha BSC	1 July 2019	27 November 2019	14	4	3	7	25	29	−4	28.57	
Total			195	78	52	65	313	285	+28	40.00	—
