= Carsten Klee =

German footballer

Personal information
- Full name: Carsten Klee
- Date of birth: 15 September 1970 (age 56)
- Place of birth: Jena, East Germany
- Height: 1.77 m (5 ft 10 in)
- Position: Forward

Youth career
- –1989: FC Carl Zeiss Jena

Senior career*
Years	Team	Apps	(Gls)
1989	BSG Wismut Gera		
1989–1994	FC Carl Zeiss Jena	103	(23)
1994–1995	FC Sachsen Leipzig	34	(18)
1995–1996	F.C. Hansa Rostock	15	(2)
1996–1998	FSV Zwickau	55	(13)
1998–2000	SpVgg Greuther Fürth	57	(12)
2000–2001	FC Sachsen Leipzig	30	(8)
2001–2003	SSV Reutlingen 05	6	(0)
2003–2004	FC Carl Zeiss Jena	43	(17)
2004–2005	FC Erfurt Nord	30	(4)
2005–2008	1. FC Zeitz		
2008	SV Grimma	13	(3)

International career
- East Germany Youth
- * Club domestic league appearances and goals

Carsten Klee (born 15 September 1970) is a former German footballer.
