= Steffen Korell =

German footballer

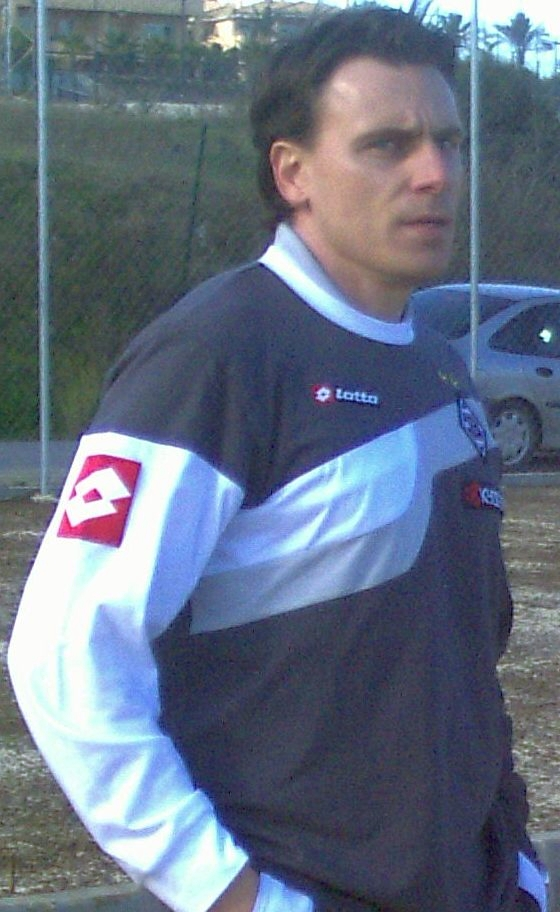
- Korell in 2008

Personal information
- Date of birth: 27 October 1971 (age 55)
- Place of birth: Zweibrücken, West Germany
- Height: 1.80 m (5 ft 11 in)
- Position: Defender

Youth career
- SV Bottenbach

Senior career*
Years	Team	Apps	(Gls)
1990–1995	FC Homburg	130	(7)
1995–2000	SC Freiburg	97	(4)
2000–2004	Borussia M'gladbach	80	(1)
Total		307	(12)
- * Club domestic league appearances and goals

Steffen Korell (born 27 October 1971) is a German former professional football who played as a defender. Since 2007 he is a director with Borussia Mönchengladbach.
