= Ojokojo Torunarigha =

Nigerian footballer (born 1970)

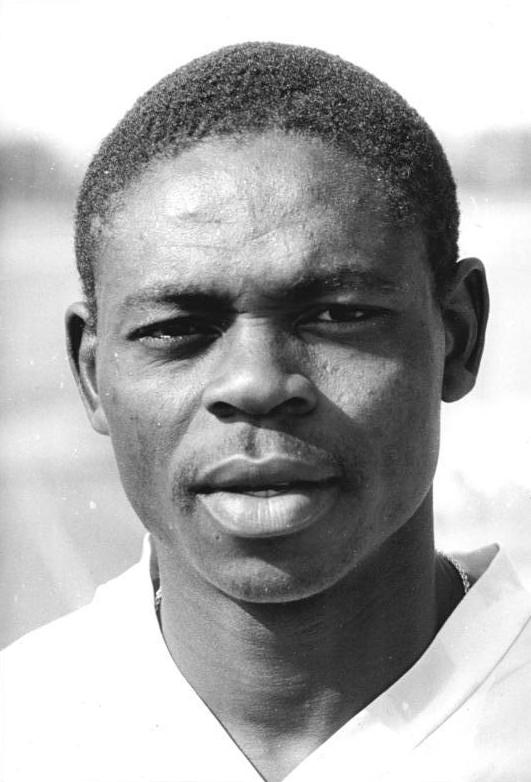
- Torunarigha in 1990

Personal information
- Date of birth: 12 March 1970 (age 56)
- Height: 1.78 m (5 ft 10 in)
- Position: Forward

Senior career*
Years	Team	Apps	(Gls)
1991–1995	Chemnitzer FC	77	(5)

International career
- Nigeria
- * Club domestic league appearances and goals

Ojokojo Torunarigha (born 12 March 1970) is a Nigerian former professional footballer who played as a forward for German club Chemnitzer FC between 1991 and 1995. He also played international football for Nigeria, and later became a coach at Hertha BSC. His sons Junior and Jordan are also footballers.
