= Jörg Lipinski =

German footballer

Personal information
- Date of birth: 31 October 1967 (age 59)
- Place of birth: Herne, Germany
- Height: 1.82 m (6 ft 0 in)
- Position: Midfielder

Senior career*
Years	Team	Apps	(Gls)
1986–1989	SC Westfalia Herne		
1989–1991	ASC Schöppingen		
1991–1994	Rot-Weiss Essen		
1994–1997	SC Fortuna Köln		
1997–2002	Rot-Weiß Oberhausen		
2002–2003	Rot-Weiss Essen		
2003–2004	1. FC Kleve		
2004–2005	TuRU Düsseldorf		
- * Club domestic league appearances and goals

Jörg Lipinski (born 31 October 1967) is a retired German football midfielder.
