= Olaf Renn =

German footballer

Personal information
- Full name: Olaf Renn
- Date of birth: 12 October 1969 (age 57)
- Place of birth: Karl-Marx-Stadt, East Germany
- Height: 1.74 m (5 ft 9 in)
- Position: Midfielder

Youth career
- –1988: FC Karl-Marx-Stadt

Senior career*
| Years | Team | Apps | (Gls) |
| 1988–1991 | CSV 51-Heckert | 54 | (11) |
| 1991–1996 | Chemnitzer FC | 157 | (13) |
| 1996–1999 | SC Fortuna Köln | 92 | (8) |
| 1999–2000 | FC Energie Cottbus | 17 | (0) |
| 2000–2002 | Chemnitzer FC | 28 | (2) |
| 2002–2004 | VfB Leipzig | | |
| 2004–2005 | VfB Chemnitz | 33 | (6) |
| 2005–2006 | Kroksblüte Drebach | | |
- * Club domestic league appearances and goals

Olaf Renn (born 12 October 1969) is a German former footballer.

Renn made 275 appearances in the 2. Bundesliga during his playing career.
