= Hertha BSC II =

German association football club from Berlin

- Full name: Hertha Berliner Sport-Club von 1892 e.V. II
- Founded: 25 July 1892; 134 years ago
- Ground: Amateurstadion, Olympiapark, Berlin, Germany
- Capacity: 4,300
- Chairman: Werner Gegenbauer
- Coach: Ante Čović
- League: Regionalliga Nordost (IV)
- 2025–26: Regionalliga Nordost, 14th of 18
| Home colours | Away colours | Third colours |

Hertha BSC II is the reserve team of Hertha BSC that is based in Berlin, Germany. Historically, during the time the senior team played in professional football the team has played as Hertha BSC Amateure. Since 2005 it has played under its current name.

The team currently plays in the tier four Regionalliga Nordost. The team's greatest achievement is reaching the final of the DFB-Pokal in 1993 – the only reserve team to have achieved this.

== History ==
The team first entered the highest football league in West Berlin, then the tier three Amateurliga Berlin, in 1968 and played at this level for three seasons with a third-place finish as its best result in the first season. After relegation in 1971 Hertha BSC Amateure made a return to the league in 1975 and achieved two runners-up finishes in the league in 1976 and 1977. It took part in the 1975–76 German amateur football championship but was knocked out in the first round by Concordia Hamburg. The team played at Oberliga level for eleven consecutive seasons before being forcibly relegated in 1986 after the senior team dropped out of professional football into what was now the Amateur-Oberliga Berlin. In 1988, after Hertha BSC had returned to the 2. Bundesliga the reserve team returned to the Amateur-Oberliga again, where it played for three more seasons until the league was disbanded in 1991.

With the German reunion league football in West Berlin was incorporated into the new leagues in former East Germany and Hertha BSC Amateure became part of the new NOFV-Oberliga Mitte. This league was disbanded in 1994 and the team qualified for the new Regionalliga Nordost. After two seasons the team dropped back to the Oberliga and now entered the NOFV-Oberliga Nord where it played for three seasons until being promoted back up in 1999. It played for one more season in the Regionalliga Nordost before this league was disbanded in 2000. The team failed to qualify for the enlarged Regionalliga Nord and instead played in the Oberliga again for another three seasons. The team returned to the Regionalliga in 2004, spend one more season in the Oberliga in 2007–08 and then played in the Regionalliga Nord again until the Regionalliga Nordost was reestablished in 2012.

Since 2012 Hertha BSC II has been playing in the Regionalliga Nordost.

The team has played in the German Cup, the DFB-Pokal, on three occasions, in 1976–77, 1992–93 and 2004–05 and is now, like all reserve teams in Germany, banned from the competition. Hertha BSC Amateure in 1992-1993, under coach Jochem Ziegert, became the only reserve side ever to reach the German Cup final when it eliminated SGK Heidelberg, VfB Leipzig, Hannover 96, 1. FC Nürnberg and Chemnitzer FC before losing the final in Berlin 1–0 to Bayer 04 Leverkusen.

== Honours ==
The team's honours

=== League ===
- NOFV-Oberliga Nord (IV)
  - Champions: (4) 1999, 2002, 2004, 2008
  - Runners-up: (3) 1998, 2001, 2003
- Oberliga Berlin (III)
  - Runners-up: (2) 1976, 1977

=== Cup ===
- DFB-Pokal
  - Runners-up: 1993
- Berliner Landespokal
  - Winners: (3) 1976, 1992, 2004
  - Runners-up: 2005

== Current squad ==
As of 8 September 2026

Note: Flags indicate national team as defined under FIFA eligibility rules; some limited exceptions apply. Players may hold more than one non-FIFA nationality.

| No. | Pos. | Nation | Player |
|---|---|---|---|
| 1 | GK | GER | Maximilian Mohwinkel |
| 3 | DF | GER | Leon Gruschwitz |
| 4 | DF | GER | David Schopper |
| 5 | DF | GER | Mustafa Kourouma |
| 6 | MF | GER | Jermaine Ngwa |
| 7 | MF | GER | Maris Schößler |
| 8 | MF | GER | Giorgio Gamm |
| 9 | FW | UAE | Yannick Müller |
| 10 | MF | TUN | Änis Ben-Hatira |
| 11 | FW | GER | Elijas Aslanidis |
| 13 | GK | GER | Konstantin Heide |
| 17 | FW | GER | Liam Kannewurf |
| 18 | DF | GER | Jaime Sherwood |
| 19 | DF | GER | Anthony Traoré |
| 20 | DF | CRO | Filip Brekalo |

| No. | Pos. | Nation | Player |
|---|---|---|---|
| 22 | MF | GEO | Shalva Ogbaidze |
| 23 | FW | TUR | Kebir Ali Canpolat |
| 24 | MF | TUR | Muhammed Özkan |
| 26 | FW | GER | Niklas Hildebrandt |
| 27 | GK | GER | Nash-Daniel Amankona |
| 30 | DF | GER | Oluwajimi Adetokunbo-Adelenu |
| 31 | DF | GER | Sebastian Weiland |
| 32 | FW | TUR | Burak Özkanlı |
| 35 | GK | GER | Christian Siebert |
| 36 | MF | TUR | Kian Todorovic |
| 37 | DF | GER | Leon Grundmann |
| 38 | MF | GER | Julius Gottschalk |
| 39 | FW | GER | Theophilus Akoto |
| 42 | DF | KOS | Diart Gashi |

=== Out on loan ===
Note: Flags indicate national team as defined under FIFA eligibility rules; some limited exceptions apply. Players may hold more than one non-FIFA nationality.

| No. | Pos. | Nation | Player |

== Recent seasons ==
The recent season-by-season performance of the club:

| Year | Division | Tier | Position |
|---|---|---|---|
| 2000–01 | NOFV-Oberliga Nord | IV | 2nd |
| 2001–02 | NOFV-Oberliga Nord | IV | 1st |
| 2002–03 | NOFV-Oberliga Nord | IV | 2nd |
| 2003–04 | NOFV-Oberliga Nord | IV | 1st↑ |
| 2004–05 | Regionalliga Nord | III | 12th |
| 2005–06 | Regionalliga Nord | III | 7th |
| 2006–07 | Regionalliga Nord | III | 18th↓ |
| 2007–08 | NOFV-Oberliga Nord | IV | 1st↑ |
| 2008–09 | Regionalliga Nord | IV | 12th |
| 2009–10 | Regionalliga Nord | IV | 11th |
| 2010–11 | Regionalliga Nord | IV | 7th |
| 2011–12 | Regionalliga Nord | IV | 14th |
| 2012–13 | Regionalliga Nordost | IV | 5th |
| 2013–14 | Regionalliga Nordost | IV | 12th |
| 2014–15 | Regionalliga Nordost | IV | 6th |
| 2015–16 | Regionalliga Nordost | IV | 10th |
| 2016–17 | Regionalliga Nordost | IV | 9th |
| 2017–18 | Regionalliga Nordost | IV | 8th |
| 2018–19 | Regionalliga Nordost | IV | 4th |
| 2019–20 | Regionalliga Nordost | IV | 5th |
| 2020–21 | Regionalliga Nordost | IV | 12th |
| 2021–22 | Regionalliga Nordost | IV | 8th |
| 2022–23 | Regionalliga Nordost | IV | 9th |
| 2023–24 | Regionalliga Nordost | IV | 14th |
| 2024–25 | Regionalliga Nordost | IV | 10th |
| 2025–26 | Regionalliga Nordost | IV | 14th |

- With the introduction of the Regionalligas in 1994 and the 3. Liga in 2008 as the new third tier, below the 2. Bundesliga, all leagues below dropped one tier. In 2012, the number of Regionalligas was increased from three to five with all Regionalliga Nord clubs from the NOFV entering the re-formed Regionalliga Nordost.

=== Key ===
| ↑ Promoted | ↓ Relegated |
