= 1991–92 VfL Bochum season =

VfL Bochum
1991–92 season
- President: Ottokar Wüst
- Head Coach: Holger Osieck
- Stadium: Ruhrstadion
- Bundesliga: 15th
- DFB-Pokal: Second Round
- Top goalscorer: League: Wegmann (11); All: Wegmann (11)
- Highest home attendance: 41,000 (vs FC Schalke 04, 9 November 1991)
- Lowest home attendance: 9,405 (vs Stuttgarter Kickers, 22 November 1991)
- Average home league attendance: 18,653
Home colours	Away colours	Third colours

The 1991–92 VfL Bochum season was the 54th season in club history.

== Matches ==
=== Legend ===
Win Draw Loss

=== Bundesliga ===
2 August 1991 1	VfL Bochum	2–2	1. FC Köln	Bochum
20:00	Epp 31'; Bonan 74'		Ordenewitz 18'; Banach 45'	Stadium: Ruhrstadion; Attendance: 30,400; Referee: Bernd Heynemann (Magdeburg)

10 August 1991 2	1. FC Kaiserslautern	1–1	VfL Bochum	Kaiserslautern
15:30	Hotić 8'		Türr 63'	Stadium: Fritz-Walter-Stadion; Attendance: 29,718; Referee: Eugen Strigel (Horb am Neckar)

13 August 1991 3	VfL Bochum	2–3	Hamburger SV	Bochum
20:00	Wegmann 27'; Helmig 30'		Nando 67'; Beiersdorfer 78'; Furtok 84'	Stadium: Ruhrstadion; Attendance: 25,000; Referee: Hans-Peter Best (Kämpfelbach)

21 August 1991 4	Eintracht Frankfurt	2–1	VfL Bochum	Frankfurt am Main
20:00	Bein 59'; Kruse 62'		Roth 43' (o.g.)	Stadium: Waldstadion; Attendance: 18,000; Referee: Klaus-Dieter Stenzel (Forst)

25 August 1991 5	VfL Bochum	0–3	1. FC Nürnberg	Bochum
18:00			Brunner 13'; Friedmann 22'; Eckstein 63'	Stadium: Ruhrstadion; Attendance: 16,000; Referee: Markus Merk (Otterbach)

28 August 1991 6	FC Bayern Munich	0–2	VfL Bochum	Munich
20:00			Bonan 59'; Benatelli 81'	Stadium: Olympiastadion; Attendance: 20,000; Referee: Günther Habermann (Weißensee)

31 August 1991 7	VfL Bochum	0–0	Borussia Dortmund	Bochum
15:30				Stadium: Ruhrstadion; Attendance: 31,000; Referee: Hans Scheuerer (Munich)

7 September 1991 8	VfB Stuttgart	4–1	VfL Bochum	Stuttgart
15:30	Walter 9' (pen.), 28', 33'; Schäfer 80'		Bonan 13'	Stadium: Neckarstadion; Attendance: 17,500; Referee: Karl-Heinz Gläser (Breitungen)

13 September 1991 9	VfL Bochum	3–1	Borussia Mönchengladbach	Bochum
20:00	Helmig 5'; Heinemann 49' (pen.); Epp 85'		Schulz 84'	Stadium: Ruhrstadion; Attendance: 16,000; Referee: Aron Schmidhuber (Ottobrunn)

20 September 1991 10	SG Wattenscheid 09	1–2	VfL Bochum	Bochum
20:00	Fink 84'		Rzehaczek 71'; Heinemann 82' (pen.)	Stadium: Lohrheidestadion; Attendance: 20,000; Referee: Wolf-Günter Wiesel (Ottbergen)

27 September 1991 11	VfL Bochum	0–2	Bayer 04 Leverkusen	Bochum
20:00			Herrlich 85'; Thom 89'	Stadium: Ruhrstadion; Attendance: 12,500; Referee: Michael Malbranc (Hamburg)

4 October 1991 12	MSV Duisburg	1–1	VfL Bochum	Duisburg
19:30	Woelk 88'		Milde 71'	Stadium: Wedaustadion; Attendance: 21,000; Referee: Georg Dardenne (Nettersheim)

11 October 1991 13	VfL Bochum	1–3	Karlsruher SC	Bochum
20:00	Milde 73'		Reichert 35'; Schütterle 45', 89'	Stadium: Ruhrstadion; Attendance: 11,100; Referee: Karl-Josef Assenmacher (Fischenich)

18 October 1991 14	SV Werder Bremen	3–0	VfL Bochum	Bremen
20:00	Neubarth 19'; Allofs 21'; Bode 75'			Stadium: Weserstadion; Attendance: 12,415; Referee: Lutz Michael Fröhlich (Berlin)

25 October 1991 15	VfL Bochum	3–2	FC Hansa Rostock	Bochum
20:00	Kempe 13'; Wegmann 19'; Bonan 32'		Spies 80'; Dowe 83'	Stadium: Ruhrstadion; Attendance: 10,507; Referee: Manfred Harder (Lüneburg)

2 November 1991 16	Fortuna Düsseldorf	3–0	VfL Bochum	Düsseldorf
15:30	Büskens 29'; Schreier 35'; Carracedo 90'			Stadium: Rheinstadion; Attendance: 10,500; Referee: Aron Schmidhuber (Ottobrunn)

9 November 1991 17	VfL Bochum	1–0	FC Schalke 04	Bochum
15:30	Wegmann 89'			Stadium: Ruhrstadion; Attendance: 41,000; Referee: Eugen Strigel (Horb am Neckar)

16 November 1991 18	Dynamo Dresden	0–0	VfL Bochum	Dresden
15:30				Stadium: Rudolf-Harbig-Stadion; Attendance: 14,000; Referee: Bernd Heynemann (Magdeburg)

22 November 1991 19	VfL Bochum	2–2	Stuttgarter Kickers	Bochum
20:00	Wegmann 25'; Benatelli 82'		Keim 59'; Moutas 69'	Stadium: Ruhrstadion; Attendance: 9,405; Referee: Wieland Ziller (Laußnitz)

30 November 1991 20	1. FC Köln	1–0	VfL Bochum	Cologne
15:30	Sturm 42'			Stadium: Radrennbahn Müngersdorf; Attendance: 13,000; Referee: Hermann Albrecht (Kaufbeuren)

7 December 1991 21	VfL Bochum	0–0	1. FC Kaiserslautern	Bochum
15:30				Stadium: Ruhrstadion; Attendance: 12,000; Referee: Rainer Boos (Kronberg)

13 December 1991 22	Hamburger SV	0–0	VfL Bochum	Hamburg
19:00				Stadium: Volksparkstadion; Attendance: 10,000; Referee: Edgar Steinborn (Sinzig)

7 February 1992 23	VfL Bochum	0–0	Eintracht Frankfurt	Bochum
20:00				Stadium: Ruhrstadion; Attendance: 19,500; Referee: Lutz Michael Fröhlich (Berlin)

14 February 1992 24	1. FC Nürnberg	1–0	VfL Bochum	Nuremberg
20:00	Golke 90'			Stadium: Städtisches Stadion; Attendance: 23,500; Referee: Günther Habermann (Weißensee)

20 February 1992 25	VfL Bochum	0–5	FC Bayern Munich	Bochum
19:15			Wohlfarth 8', 33', 50'; Ziege 18', 55'	Stadium: Ruhrstadion; Attendance: 17,500; Referee: Gerhard Theobald (Neunkirchen)

29 February 1992 26	Borussia Dortmund	1–1	VfL Bochum	Dortmund
15:30	Rummenigge 67'		Wegmann 55'	Stadium: Westfalenstadion; Attendance: 44,509; Referee: Hans-Joachim Osmers (Bremen)

7 March 1992 27	VfL Bochum	0–2	VfB Stuttgart	Bochum
15:30			Walter 82'; Sammer 89'	Stadium: Ruhrstadion; Attendance: 13,000; Referee: Werner Föckler (Bad Dürkheim)

13 March 1992 28	Borussia Mönchengladbach	1–2	VfL Bochum	Mönchengladbach
20:00	Schulz 83'		Schwanke 19'; Knoflíček 87'	Stadium: Bökelbergstadion; Attendance: 13,500; Referee: Markus Merk (Otterbach)

20 March 1992 29	VfL Bochum	1–1	SG Wattenscheid 09	Bochum
20:00	Hartmann 14' (o.g.)		Langbein 39'	Stadium: Ruhrstadion; Attendance: 20,000; Referee: Georg Dardenne (Nettersheim)

28 March 1992 30	Bayer 04 Leverkusen	2–0	VfL Bochum	Leverkusen
15:30	Reekers 25' (o.g.); Kree 83' (pen.)			Stadium: Ulrich-Haberland-Stadion; Attendance: 9,000; Referee: Hans-Peter Best (Kämpfelbach)

3 April 1992 31	VfL Bochum	2–1	MSV Duisburg	Bochum
20:00	Woelk 8' (o.g.); Wegmann 10'		Tönnies 52'	Stadium: Ruhrstadion; Attendance: 20,000; Referee: Hans Fux (Stutensee)

11 April 1992 32	Karlsruher SC	1–1	VfL Bochum	Karlsruhe
15:30	Carl 12'		Wegmann 23'	Stadium: Wildparkstadion; Attendance: 13,500; Referee: Aron Schmidhuber (Ottobrunn)

18 April 1992 33	VfL Bochum	2–2	SV Werder Bremen	Bochum
15:30	Dreßel 54'; Heinemann 90' (pen.)		Bode 48'; Rufer 69'	Stadium: Ruhrstadion; Attendance: 13,500; Referee: Klaus-Dieter Stenzel (Forst)

24 April 1992 34	FC Hansa Rostock	0–2	VfL Bochum	Rostock
20:00			Böger 6' (o.g.); Wegmann 73'	Stadium: Ostseestadion; Attendance: 10,000; Referee: Wieland Ziller (Laußnitz)

1 May 1992 35	VfL Bochum	3–0	Fortuna Düsseldorf	Bochum
18:00	Wegmann 36'; Heinemann 50' (pen.); Türr 80'			Stadium: Ruhrstadion; Attendance: 19,000; Referee: Jürgen Aust (Cologne)

5 May 1992 36	FC Schalke 04	2–1	VfL Bochum	Gelsenkirchen
20:00	Anderbrügge 13' (pen.); Christensen 19'		Wegmann 84'	Stadium: Parkstadion; Attendance: 51,200; Referee: Karl-Josef Assenmacher (Fischenich)

9 May 1992 37	VfL Bochum	1–0	Dynamo Dresden	Bochum
15:30	Wegmann 83'			Stadium: Ruhrstadion; Attendance: 17,000; Referee: Aron Schmidhuber (Ottobrunn)

16 May 1992 38	Stuttgarter Kickers	2–0	VfL Bochum	Stuttgart
15:30	Cayasso 65'; Marin 68' (pen.)			Stadium: Neckarstadion; Attendance: 12,000; Referee: Hans-Jürgen Kasper (Katlenburg)

=== DFB-Pokal ===
17 August 1991 R2	VfL Bochum	2–3	Hannover 96	Bochum
15:30	Bonan 15'; Wójcicki 38' (o.g.)		Steubing 18'; Weiland 30'; Surmann 35'	Stadium: Ruhrstadion; Attendance: 5,000; Referee: Hans Fux (Stutensee)

== Squad ==
=== Squad and statistics ===
==== Squad, appearances and goals scored ====
No.	Pos	Nat	Player	Total		Bundesliga		DFB-Pokal	
No.	Pos	Nat	Player	Apps	Goals	Apps	Goals	Apps	Goals
	MF	(Germany) GER	Frank Benatelli	19	2	19	2	0	0
	MF	(Germany) GER	Heiko Bonan	39	5	38	4	1	1
	DF	(Germany) GER	Olaf Dreßel	21	1	21	1	0	0
	GK	(Germany) GER	Carsten Eisenmenger (until 7 October 1991)	0	0	0	0	0	0
	MF	(Germany) GER	Dirk Eitzert	24	0	24	0	0	0
	FW	(Germany) GER	Thomas Epp	20	2	19	2	1	0
	DF	(France) FRA	Patrick Guillou	3	0	3	0	0	0
	MF	(Germany) GER	Frank Heinemann	35	4	34	4	1	0
	MF	(Germany) GER	Dirk Helmig	21	2	20	2	1	0
	DF	(Germany) GER	Christian Herrmann	29	0	29	0	0	0
	DF	(Germany) GER	Michael Hubner	0	0	0	0	0	0
	DF	(Germany) GER	Thomas Kempe	29	1	28	1	1	0
	FW	(Germany) GER	Michael Klauß	4	0	3	0	1	0
	FW	(Czechoslovakia) TCH	Ivo Knoflíček	10	1	10	1	0	0
	MF	(Germany) GER	Dirk Kontny	2	0	1	0	1	0
	FW	(Germany) GER	Rocco Milde	21	2	21	2	0	0
	MF	(Germany) GER	Josef Nehl	6	0	5	0	1	0
	MF	(Germany) GER	Peter Peschel	13	0	13	0	0	0
	DF	(Netherlands) NED	Rob Reekers	29	0	28	0	1	0
	DF	(Spain) ESP	Antonio Manuel Rodríguez Cabo	0	0	0	0	0	0
	MF	(Germany) GER	Michael Rzehaczek	29	1	28	1	1	0
	DF	(Germany) GER	Thorsten Schmugge	0	0	0	0	0	0
	MF	(Germany) GER	Jörg Schwanke	16	1	16	1	0	0
	FW	(Germany) GER	Frank Türr	18	2	17	2	1	0
	MF	(Germany) GER	Uwe Wegmann	35	11	34	11	1	0
	GK	(Germany) GER	Andreas Wessels	11	0	10	0	1	0
	MF	(Germany) GER	Dariusz Wosz (since 1 January 1992)	16	0	16	0	0	0
	DF	(Germany) GER	Peter Zanter	12	0	12	0	0	0
	GK	(Germany) GER	Ralf Zumdick	28	0	28	0	0	0

=== Transfers ===
==== Summer ====
In:

No.	Pos.	Nation	Player
—	MF	GER	Heiko Bonan (from Berliner FC Dynamo)
—	MF	GER	Dirk Eitzert (from VfL Bochum II)
—	FW	GER	Michael Klauß (from Bayer 05 Uerdingen)
—	FW	TCH	Ivo Knoflíček (from FC St. Pauli)
—	MF	GER	Dirk Kontny (from SG Wattenscheid 09)
—	DF	ESP	Antonio Manuel Rodríguez Cabo (from UD Realejos)
—	DF	GER	Thorsten Schmugge (from VfL Bochum II)
—	MF	GER	Jörg Schwanke (from FC Energie Cottbus)
—	FW	GER	Frank Türr (from 1. FC Nürnberg)

Out:

No.	Pos.	Nation	Player
—	FW	GER	Stefan Kohn (to SV Werder Bremen)
—	MF	GER	Thorsten Legat (to SV Werder Bremen)
—	FW	GER	Uwe Leifeld (to FC Schalke 04)
—	MF	GER	Elard Ostermann (to VfB Lübeck)
—	DF	GER	Walter Oswald (to VfL Bochum II)
—	DF	GER	Andreas Ridder (to Arminia Bielefeld)
—	FW	GER	Adam Woitynek (to VfR Sölde)

==== Winter ====
In:

No.	Pos.	Nation	Player
—	MF	GER	Dariusz Wosz (from Hallescher FC)

Out:

No.	Pos.	Nation	Player
—	GK	GER	Carsten Eisenmenger (to SC Freiburg)
