= 1992–93 VfL Bochum season =

VfL Bochum
1992–93 season
- President: Ottokar Wüst
- Head Coach: Holger Osieck (until 2 November 1992); Jürgen Gelsdorf (since 6 November 1992)
- Stadium: Ruhrstadion
- Bundesliga: 16th (relegated)
- DFB-Pokal: Second round
- Intertoto Cup: Group stage
- Top goalscorer: League: Wegmann (13); All: Wegmann (14)
- Highest home attendance: 41,021 (vs 1. FC Köln, 22 May 1993)
- Lowest home attendance: 12,000 (vs Dynamo Dresden, 20 November 1992)
- Average home league attendance: 23,377
Home colours	Away colours	Third colours

The 1992–93 VfL Bochum season was the 55th season in club history.

== Review and events ==
On 2 November 1992 head coach Holger Osieck was sacked. Jürgen Gelsdorf was appointed head coach on 6 November 1992.

== Matches ==
=== Legend ===
Win Draw Loss

=== Bundesliga ===
15 August 1992 1	VfL Bochum	2–2	Borussia Dortmund	Bochum
15:30	Wegmann 16', 26'		Zorc 45'; Mill 49'	Stadium: Ruhrstadion; Attendance: 40,000; Referee: Hans Scheuerer (Munich)

22 August 1992 2	Borussia Mönchengladbach	1–1	VfL Bochum	Mönchengladbach
15:30	Kempe 33' (o.g.)		Reekers 4'	Stadium: Bökelbergstadion; Attendance: 22,298; Referee: Michael Malbranc (Hamburg)

26 August 1992 3	VfL Bochum	4–0	1. FC Saarbrücken	Bochum
20:00	Heinemann 43' (pen.); Moutas 54', 76'; Wegmann 69'			Stadium: Ruhrstadion; Attendance: 15,000; Referee: Hartmut Strampe (Handorf)

29 August 1992 4	SV Werder Bremen	3–1	VfL Bochum	Bremen
15:30	Schwanke 15' (o.g.); Votava 18'; Bratseth 39'		Herrmann 44'	Stadium: Weserstadion; Attendance: 12,100; Referee: Lutz Michael Fröhlich (Berlin)

2 September 1992 5	VfL Bochum	0–0	VfB Stuttgart	Bochum
20:00				Stadium: Ruhrstadion; Attendance: 15,000; Referee: Bernd Heynemann (Magdeburg)

5 September 1992 6	1. FC Nürnberg	2–1	VfL Bochum	Nuremberg
15:30	Eckstein 49', 66'		Moutas 78'	Stadium: Frankenstadion; Attendance: 22,000; Referee: Klaus-Dieter Stenzel (Forst)

18 September 1992 7	VfL Bochum	2–2	Bayer 04 Leverkusen	Bochum
20:00	Wegmann 1'; Bonan 53'		Nehl 37'; Fischer 43'	Stadium: Ruhrstadion; Attendance: 16,000; Referee: Edgar Steinborn (Sinzig)

26 September 1992 8	Karlsruher SC	1–0	VfL Bochum	Karlsruhe
15:30	Krieg 30'			Stadium: Wildparkstadion; Attendance: 15,000; Referee: Hans-Peter Dellwing (Trier)

2 October 1992 9	Hamburger SV	2–0	VfL Bochum	Hamburg
20:00	Hartmann 15'; Bester 89'			Stadium: Volksparkstadion; Attendance: 16,650; Referee: Rainer Boos (Kronberg)

16 October 1992 10	VfL Bochum	0–1	FC Schalke 04	Bochum
20:00			Christensen 33'	Stadium: Ruhrstadion; Attendance: 39,087; Referee: Gerhard Theobald (Neunkirchen)

24 October 1992 11	Bayer 05 Uerdingen	2–1	VfL Bochum	Krefeld
15:30	Bremser 42'; Posch 66'		Dreßel 6'	Stadium: Grotenburg-Stadion; Attendance: 8,600; Referee: Georg Dardenne (Nettersheim)

31 October 1992 12	VfL Bochum	1–3	1. FC Kaiserslautern	Bochum
15:30	Wegmann 37'		Lieberknecht 59'; Goldbæk 71'; Witeczek 77'	Stadium: Ruhrstadion; Attendance: 13,000; Referee: Frank Kiefer (Baunatal)

14 November 1992 13	Eintracht Frankfurt	4–1	VfL Bochum	Frankfurt am Main
15:30	Bein 10' (pen.); Yeboah 68', 74'; Schmitt 87'		Wegmann 25'	Stadium: Waldstadion; Attendance: 15,000; Referee: Hans-Joachim Osmers (Bremen)

20 November 1992 14	VfL Bochum	2–2	Dynamo Dresden	Bochum
20:00	Reekers 52'; Dreßel 90'		Stević 18', 34'	Stadium: Ruhrstadion; Attendance: 12,000; Referee: Hermann Albrecht (Kaufbeuren)

28 November 1992 15	1. FC Köln	1–0	VfL Bochum	Cologne
15:30	Greiner 25'			Stadium: Radrennbahn Müngersdorf; Attendance: 18,000; Referee: Aron Schmidhuber (Ottobrunn)

5 December 1992 16	VfL Bochum	2–2	FC Bayern Munich	Bochum
15:30	Wegmann 1', 71'		Labbadia 47'; Matthäus 89'	Stadium: Ruhrstadion; Attendance: 38,000; Referee: Jürgen Wippermann (Bonn)

11 December 1992 17	SG Wattenscheid 09	2–0	VfL Bochum	Bochum
19:30	Sané 22', 39'			Stadium: Lohrheidestadion; Attendance: 18,000; Referee: Eugen Strigel (Horb am Neckar)

20 February 1993 18	Borussia Dortmund	1–0	VfL Bochum	Dortmund
15:30	Sammer 72'			Stadium: Westfalenstadion; Attendance: 41,730; Referee: Georg Dardenne (Nettersheim)

26 February 1993 19	VfL Bochum	2–1	Borussia Mönchengladbach	Bochum
20:00	Wosz 17'; Herrmann 60'		Max 86'	Stadium: Ruhrstadion; Attendance: 25,000; Referee: Hans Fux (Stutensee)

6 March 1993 20	1. FC Saarbrücken	1–1	VfL Bochum	Saarbrücken
15:30	Kristl 50'		Christians 4'	Stadium: Ludwigsparkstadion; Attendance: 15,200; Referee: Hans-Peter Best (Kämpfelbach)

13 March 1993 21	VfL Bochum	2–0	SV Werder Bremen	Bochum
15:30	Heinemann 9' (pen.); Christians 44'			Stadium: Ruhrstadion; Attendance: 20,500; Referee: Wieland Ziller (Laußnitz)

20 March 1993 22	VfB Stuttgart	4–1	VfL Bochum	Stuttgart
15:30	Kögl 5'; Walter 32'; Buchwald 60'; Knup 77'		Klauß 89'	Stadium: Neckarstadion; Attendance: 19,000; Referee: Alfons Berg (Konz)

26 March 1993 23	VfL Bochum	4–0	1. FC Nürnberg	Bochum
20:00	Wegmann 16'; Herrmann 29'; Aden 36', 76'			Stadium: Ruhrstadion; Attendance: 17,500; Referee: Markus Merk (Otterbach)

3 April 1993 24	Bayer 04 Leverkusen	3–1	VfL Bochum	Leverkusen
15:30	Klauß 50' (o.g.); Kirsten 52', 87'		Schwanke 17'	Stadium: Ulrich-Haberland-Stadion; Attendance: 16,700; Referee: Michael Prengel (Düsseldorf)

10 April 1993 25	VfL Bochum	2–2	Karlsruher SC	Bochum
15:30	Aden 8', 24'		Nowotny 9', 20'	Stadium: Ruhrstadion; Attendance: 18,001; Referee: Manfred Harder (Lüneburg)

16 April 1993 26	VfL Bochum	1–2	Hamburger SV	Bochum
20:00	Aden 61'		Furtok 38'; Letchkov 53'	Stadium: Ruhrstadion; Attendance: 22,300; Referee: Gerhard Theobald (Neunkirchen)

24 April 1993 27	FC Schalke 04	0–3	VfL Bochum	Gelsenkirchen
15:30			Aden 23', 31'; Wegmann 83'	Stadium: Parkstadion; Attendance: 51,800; Referee: Karl-Heinz Gläser (Breitungen)

27 April 1993 28	VfL Bochum	4–1	Bayer 05 Uerdingen	Bochum
20:00	Kempe 12'; Aden 66'; Christians 81'; Bonan 84'		Rahner 2'	Stadium: Ruhrstadion; Attendance: 19,000; Referee: Hartmut Strampe (Handorf)

1 May 1993 29	1. FC Kaiserslautern	3–1	VfL Bochum	Kaiserslautern
15:30	Marin 17'; Vogel 28'; Kuntz 43'		Wegmann 65'	Stadium: Fritz-Walter-Stadion; Attendance: 30,704; Referee: Hans-Joachim Osmers (Bremen)

8 May 1993 30	VfL Bochum	1–0	Eintracht Frankfurt	Bochum
15:30	Wegmann 56'			Stadium: Ruhrstadion; Attendance: 26,000; Referee: Hans-Peter Dellwing (Trier)

15 May 1993 31	Dynamo Dresden	0–0	VfL Bochum	Dresden
15:30				Stadium: Rudolf-Harbig-Stadion; Attendance: 16,700; Referee: Wolf-Günter Wiesel (Ottbergen)

22 May 1993 32	VfL Bochum	0–0	1. FC Köln	Bochum
15:30				Stadium: Ruhrstadion; Attendance: 41,021; Referee: Aron Schmidhuber (Ottobrunn)

29 May 1993 33	FC Bayern Munich	3–1	VfL Bochum	Munich
15:30	Scholl 29'; Ziege 32'; Matthäus 43'		Wosz 74'	Stadium: Olympiastadion; Attendance: 64,000; Referee: Alfons Berg (Konz)

5 June 1993 34	VfL Bochum	3–1	SG Wattenscheid 09	Bochum
15:30	Wegmann 19'; Wosz 45'; Aden 53'		Tschiskale 64'	Stadium: Ruhrstadion; Attendance: 20,000; Referee: Jürgen Aust (Cologne)

=== DFB-Pokal ===
19 August 1992 R1	SpVgg Fürth	0–2	VfL Bochum	Fürth
18:15			Moutas 4'; Schwanke 70'	Stadium: Sportpark Ronhof; Attendance: 4,800; Referee: Hans Wolf (Stuttgart)

11 September 1992 R2	VfL Bochum	1–2	Hannover 96	Bochum
20:00	Wegmann 34'		Raičković 58'; Groth 85'	Stadium: Ruhrstadion; Attendance: 8,500; Referee: Norbert Haupt (Berlin)

=== Intertoto Cup ===
1 July 1992 GS1	VfL Bochum	2–2	(Sweden) Helsingborgs IF
	Wosz ?'; Bonan ?'			Attendance: 1,500

5 July 1992 GS2	VfL Bochum	3–2	(Austria) SK Rapid Vienna
	Moutas 17'; Rzehaczek 37'; Kim 87'		Myatlitski 69'; Fjørtoft 77'	Attendance: 15,000

8 July 1992 GS3	VfL Bochum	1–1	(Denmark) Brøndby IF	Herne
	Epp ?'			Attendance: 1,000

15 July 1992 GS4	Helsingborgs IF (Sweden)	1–1	VfL Bochum
	Dahlgren 42'		Epp 62'	Attendance: 1,000

18 July 1992 GS5	SK Rapid Vienna (Austria)	1–0	VfL Bochum
	Fjørtoft 84' (pen.)			Attendance: 2,000

22 July 1992 GS6	Brøndby IF (Denmark)	1–0	VfL Bochum

== Squad ==
=== Squad and statistics ===
==== Squad, appearances and goals scored ====
No.	Pos	Nat	Player	Total		Bundesliga		DFB-Pokal		Intertoto Cup	
No.	Pos	Nat	Player	Apps	Goals	Apps	Goals	Apps	Goals	Apps	Goals
	FW	(Germany) GER	Holger Aden (since 7 December 1992)	18	9	18	9	0	0		
	MF	(Germany) GER	Heiko Bonan	33	2	31	2	2	0		
	DF	(Germany) GER	Sven Christians	26	3	25	3	1	0		
	DF	(Germany) GER	Olaf Dreßel	19	2	17	2	2	0		
	MF	(Germany) GER	Dirk Eitzert	8	0	8	0	0	0		
	FW	(Germany) GER	Thomas Epp	0	0	0	0	0	0		
	DF	(France) FRA	Patrick Guillou	5	0	5	0	0	0		
	MF	(Germany) GER	Frank Heinemann	34	2	32	2	2	0		
	MF	(Germany) GER	Dirk Helmig	0	0	0	0	0	0		
	DF	(Germany) GER	Christian Herrmann	34	3	32	3	2	0		
	DF	(Germany) GER	Thomas Kempe	33	1	32	1	1	0		
	FW	(South Korea) KOR	Chu-sŏng Kim	13	0	13	0	0	0		
	FW	(Germany) GER	Michael Klauß	11	1	10	1	1	0		
	FW	(Ukraine) UKR	Volodymyr Lyutyi (since 1 December 1992)	3	0	3	0	0	0		
	FW	(Germany) GER	Rocco Milde	15	0	14	0	1	0		
	FW	(Greece) GRE	Dimitrios Moutas	17	4	15	3	2	1		
	MF	(Germany) GER	Peter Peschel	8	0	7	0	1	0		
	DF	(Netherlands) NED	Rob Reekers	35	2	34	2	1	0		
	MF	(Germany) GER	Michael Rzehaczek	9	0	8	0	1	0		
	MF	(Germany) GER	Jörg Schwanke	30	2	28	1	2	1		
	FW	(Germany) GER	Frank Türr	7	0	5	0	2	0		
	MF	(Germany) GER	Uwe Wegmann	34	14	33	13	1	1		
	GK	(Germany) GER	Andreas Wessels	17	0	15	0	2	0		
	MF	(Germany) GER	Dariusz Wosz	35	3	33	3	2	0		
	DF	(Germany) GER	Peter Zanter	0	0	0	0	0	0		
	MF	(Germany) GER	Christian Zetzmann	0	0	0	0	0	0		
	GK	(Germany) GER	Ralf Zumdick	19	0	19	0	0	0		

=== Transfers ===
==== Summer ====
In:

No.	Pos.	Nation	Player
—	FW	KOR	Chu-sŏng Kim (from Daewoo Royals)
—	FW	GRE	Dimitrios Moutas (from Stuttgarter Kickers)
—	MF	GER	Christian Zetzmann (from Borussia Dortmund II)

Out:

No.	Pos.	Nation	Player
—	MF	GER	Frank Benatelli (retired)
—	FW	TCH	Ivo Knoflíček (to SK Vorwärts Steyr)
—	DF	ESP	Antonio Manuel Rodríguez Cabo (to UD Realejos)
—	DF	GER	Thorsten Schmugge (to Wuppertaler SV)

==== Winter ====
In:

No.	Pos.	Nation	Player
—	FW	GER	Holger Aden (from Eintracht Braunschweig)
—	FW	UKR	Volodymyr Lyutyi (from MSV Duisburg)

Out:

No.	Pos.	Nation	Player

== VfL Bochum II ==
No.	Pos	Nat	Player	Total		Oberliga Westfalen	
No.	Pos	Nat	Player	Apps	Goals	Apps	Goals
	DF	(Germany) GER	Markus Alexi	13	0	13	0
	DF	(Germany) GER	Raphael Gebker	28	6	28	6
	DF	(Germany) GER	Andre Golicki	28	0	28	0
	DF	(France) FRA	Patrick Guillou	24	2	24	2
	MF	(Germany) GER	Thomas Hummel	12	0	12	0
	DF	(United States) USA	Zak Ibsen	5	0	5	0
	FW	(Germany) GER	Willi Koppmann	26	3	26	3
	MF	(Germany) GER	Michael Krawczyk	17	3	17	3
	DF	(Germany) GER	Michael Lameck	2	0	2	0
			Lehnert	2	0	2	0
	DF	(Germany) GER	Andreas Luhn	34	0	34	0
			Manu	1	0	1	0
	DF	(Germany) GER	Walter Oswald	15	0	15	0
	FW	(Germany) GER	Volker Pongratz	3	0	3	0
	DF	(Germany) GER	Andreas Pospiech	25	2	25	2
	DF	(Germany) GER	Jens Renkhoff	27	2	27	2
	GK	(Germany) GER	Andreas Roch	27	0	27	0
	MF	(Germany) GER	Safet Samur	5	0	5	0
	DF	(Germany) GER	Udo Schacky	29	2	29	2
	MF	(Germany) GER	Norbert Schywalski	20	1	20	1
	GK	(Germany) GER	Markus Volkmann	9	0	9	0
	DF	(Germany) GER	Markus Waldmann	7	0	7	0
	MF	(Germany) GER	Thorsten Zahlmann	25	0	25	0
	MF	(Germany) GER	Mark Zenker	13	0	13	0
	MF	(Germany) GER	Christian Zetzmann	28	2	28	2
	MF	(Germany) GER	Maurice Zorko	1	0	1	0
