= 1993–94 VfL Bochum season =

VfL Bochum
1993–94 season
- President: Ottokar Wüst (until 19 August 1993); Werner Altegoer (since 19 August 1993)
- Head Coach: Jürgen Gelsdorf
- Stadium: Ruhrstadion
- 2. Bundesliga: 1st (promoted)
- DFB-Pokal: Second Round
- Intertoto Cup: Group stage
- Top goalscorer: League: Wegmann (22); All: N/A
- Highest home attendance: 30,000 (vs TSV 1860 Munich, 10 April 1994)
- Lowest home attendance: 11,000 (vs Hertha BSC, 8 November 1993)
- Average home league attendance: 17,189
Home colours	Away colours	Third colours

The 1993–94 VfL Bochum season was the 56th season in club history.

== Review and events ==
After the club was relegated from the Bundesliga in the previous season club president Ottokar Wüst decided to step down. Wüsts tenure as club president ended on 19 August 1993 when the club members voted Werner Altegoer into office.

== Matches ==
=== Legend ===
Win Draw Loss

=== 2. Bundesliga ===
28 July 1993 1	SV Meppen	0–1	VfL Bochum	Meppen
19:00			Wegmann 17'	Stadium: Emslandstadion; Attendance: 15,600; Referee: Hans-Joachim Osmers (Bremen)

31 July 1993 2	VfL Bochum	2–0	FC Hansa Rostock	Bochum
15:30	Aden 32', 83'			Stadium: Ruhrstadion; Attendance: 16,000; Referee: Thomas Leimert (Ludwigshafen)

8 August 1993 3	Rot-Weiss Essen	0–2	VfL Bochum	Essen
15:00			Christians 24' (pen.); Wosz 61'	Stadium: Georg-Melches-Stadion; Attendance: 25,000; Referee: Aron Schmidhuber (Ottobrunn)

13 August 1993 4	VfL Bochum	3–1	Stuttgarter Kickers	Bochum
20:00	Aden 5', 49'; Wegmann 68'		Bobic 79'	Stadium: Ruhrstadion; Attendance: 18,000; Referee: Jürgen Wippermann (Bonn)

21 August 1993 5	Tennis Borussia Berlin	1–1	VfL Bochum	Berlin
15:30	Vogel 84'		Kim 50'	Stadium: Mommsenstadion; Attendance: 3,800; Referee: Helmut Fleischer (Ulm)

29 August 1993 6	VfL Bochum	2–0	1. FSV Mainz 05	Bochum
15:00	Wegmann 19'; Helmig 86'			Stadium: Ruhrstadion; Attendance: 18,000; Referee: Torsten Koop (Lüttenmark)

5 September 1993 7	Hannover 96	0–0	VfL Bochum	Hannover
15:00				Stadium: Niedersachsenstadion; Attendance: 19,500; Referee: Norbert Haupt (Berlin)

19 September 1993 8	VfL Bochum	4–0	1. FC Saarbrücken	Bochum
18:00	Wegmann 63', 89'; Kim 69', 90'			Stadium: Ruhrstadion; Attendance: 19,000; Referee: Manfred Harder (Lüneburg)

25 September 1993 9	TSV 1860 Munich	4–1	VfL Bochum	Munich
15:30	Störzenhofecker 29'; Winkler 58', 73'; Pacult 84'		Wegmann 68'	Stadium: Stadion an der Grünwalder Straße; Attendance: 29,000; Referee: Bernd Heynemann (Magdeburg)

1 October 1993 10	VfL Bochum	3–0	FC Carl Zeiss Jena	Bochum
19:30	Christians 33'; Herrmann 44'; Aden 80'			Stadium: Ruhrstadion; Attendance: 14,000; Referee: Roland Schäfer (Frankenthal)

8 October 1993 11	VfL Bochum	1–0	Wuppertaler SV	Bochum
20:00	Matysik 45' (o.g.)			Stadium: Ruhrstadion; Attendance: 23,000; Referee: Peter Weise (Gera)

18 October 1993 12	FC St. Pauli	1–1	VfL Bochum	Hamburg
20:15	Sailer 67'		Wegmann 35'	Stadium: Millerntor-Stadion; Attendance: 18,300; Referee: Bodo Brandt-Cholle (Berlin)

23 October 1993 13	VfL Bochum	0–0	Bayer 05 Uerdingen	Bochum
15:30				Stadium: Ruhrstadion; Attendance: 15,000; Referee: Lutz Wagner (Kriftel)

30 October 1993 14	SC Fortuna Köln	1–2	VfL Bochum	Cologne
15:30	Deffke 42'		Wegmann 32'; Guðjónsson 38'	Stadium: Südstadion; Attendance: 8,000; Referee: Thomas Leimert (Ludwigshafen)

8 November 1993 15	VfL Bochum	3–1	Hertha BSC	Bochum
20:15	Aden 6'; Wegmann 43'; Heinemann 53' (pen.)		Wollitz 51' (pen.)	Stadium: Ruhrstadion; Attendance: 11,000; Referee: Wolf-Günter Wiesel (Ottbergen)

14 November 1993 16	SV Waldhof Mannheim	1–0	VfL Bochum	Mannheim
14:15	Kirsten 74' (pen.)			Stadium: Stadion am Alsenweg; Attendance: 8,000; Referee: Manfred Schmidt (Bad Hersfeld)

19 November 1993 17	VfL Bochum	2–0	VfL Wolfsburg	Bochum
20:00	Kim 18'; Aden 37'			Stadium: Ruhrstadion; Attendance: 12,100; Referee: Günther Frey (Neu-Ulm)

27 November 1993 18	FC 08 Homburg	0–0	VfL Bochum	Homburg
15:30				Stadium: Waldstadion; Attendance: 2,000; Referee: Hans-Peter Best (Kämpfelbach)

5 December 1993 19	VfL Bochum	3–2	Chemnitzer FC	Bochum
15:00	Reekers 34'; Wegmann 52'; Peschel 75'		Torunarigha 9'; Köhler 81' (pen.)	Stadium: Ruhrstadion; Attendance: 13,500; Referee: Hermann Albrecht (Kaufbeuren)

19 February 1994 20	VfL Bochum	4–0	SV Meppen	Bochum
15:30	Wegmann 14', 75', 78'; Guðjónsson 28'			Stadium: Ruhrstadion; Attendance: 17,500; Referee: Lutz Michael Fröhlich (Berlin)

27 February 1994 21	FC Hansa Rostock	2–1	VfL Bochum	Rostock
15:00	Zallmann 57'; Dowe 62'		Wegmann 5'	Stadium: Ostseestadion; Attendance: 2,000; Referee: Herbert Fandel (Kyllburg)

5 March 1994 22	VfL Bochum	2–0	Rot-Weiss Essen	Bochum
15:30	Wegmann 71'; Wosz 80'			Stadium: Ruhrstadion; Attendance: 19,000; Referee: Winfried Buchhart (Schrobenhausen)

13 March 1994 23	Stuttgarter Kickers	0–0	VfL Bochum	Stuttgart
15:00				Stadium: Waldau-Stadion; Attendance: 5,300; Referee: Lutz Pohlmann (Felde)

18 March 1994 24	VfL Bochum	5–1	Tennis Borussia Berlin	Bochum
20:00	von Ahlen 28'; Stöver 38', 40'; Wegmann 48' (pen.); Peschel 78'		Goldbæk 51'	Stadium: Ruhrstadion; Attendance: 12,000; Referee: Willi Hofmann (Ansbach)

27 March 1994 25	1. FSV Mainz 05	3–2	VfL Bochum	Mainz
15:00	Müller 22'; Buvač 37'; Wagner 55'		Wegmann 1', 2'	Stadium: Bruchwegstadion; Attendance: 6,300; Referee: Frank Kiefer (Baunatal)

3 April 1994 26	VfL Bochum	2–2	Hannover 96	Bochum
15:00	Wegmann 30', 45' (pen.)		Pförtner 29'; Winkler 73'	Stadium: Ruhrstadion; Attendance: 15,000; Referee: Klaus Holz (Lauingen)

6 April 1994 27	1. FC Saarbrücken	0–1	VfL Bochum	Saarbrücken
19:30			Herrmann 68'	Stadium: Ludwigsparkstadion; Attendance: 7,500; Referee: Uwe Kemmling (Kleinburgwedel)

10 April 1994 28	VfL Bochum	2–0	TSV 1860 Munich	Bochum
18:00	Hubner 2'; Wegmann 24'			Stadium: Ruhrstadion; Attendance: 30,000; Referee: Frank Fleske (Eisenhüttenstadt)

17 May 1994 29	FC Carl Zeiss Jena	0–0	VfL Bochum	Jena
19:30				Stadium: Ernst-Abbe-Sportfeld; Attendance: 6,700; Referee: Jürgen Wippermann (Bonn)

23 April 1994 30	Wuppertaler SV	3–1	VfL Bochum	Wuppertal
15:30	Broos 15'; Schön 36'; Hartwig 46'		Michalke 80'	Stadium: Stadion am Zoo; Attendance: 13,000; Referee: Manfred Harder (Lüneburg)

29 April 1994 31	VfL Bochum	1–1	FC St. Pauli	Bochum
20:00	von Ahlen 42'		Marin 43'	Stadium: Ruhrstadion; Attendance: 25,000; Referee: Markus Merk (Otterbach)

31 May 1994 32	Bayer 05 Uerdingen	3–0	VfL Bochum	Krefeld
20:00	Stöver 21' (o.g.); Geilenkirchen 36'; Feldhoff 45'			Stadium: Grotenburg-Stadion; Attendance: 9,300; Referee: Bernhard Zerr (Ottersweier)

13 May 1994 33	VfL Bochum	1–0	SC Fortuna Köln	Bochum
20:00	Wegmann 23'			Stadium: Ruhrstadion; Attendance: 15,000; Referee: Michael Prengel (Düsseldorf)

21 May 1994 34	Hertha BSC	1–1	VfL Bochum	Berlin
15:30	Stöver 63' (o.g.)		Guðjónsson 88'	Stadium: Olympiastadion; Attendance: 10,500; Referee: Winfried Buchhart (Schrobenhausen)

24 May 1994 35	VfL Bochum	0–1	SV Waldhof Mannheim	Bochum
20:00			Kirsten 43'	Stadium: Ruhrstadion; Attendance: 17,000; Referee: Uwe Kemmling (Kleinburgwedel)

28 May 1994 36	VfL Wolfsburg	0–1	VfL Bochum	Wolfsburg
15:30			Wosz 59'	Stadium: VfL-Stadion am Elsterweg; Attendance: 6,300; Referee: Günther Frey (Neu-Ulm)

4 June 1994 37	VfL Bochum	1–4	FC 08 Homburg	Bochum
15:30	Michalke 16'		Simon 11'; Maciel 37' (pen.); Homp 48'; Freiler 58'	Stadium: Ruhrstadion; Attendance: 16,500; Referee: Eugen Strigel (Horb am Neckar)

11 June 1994 38	Chemnitzer FC	1–0	VfL Bochum	Chemnitz
15:30	Renn 29'			Stadium: Sportforum; Attendance: 5,200; Referee: Lutz Pohlmann (Felde)

=== DFB-Pokal ===
23 August 1993 R2	FC Schalke 04	1–0 (a.e.t.)	VfL Bochum	Gelsenkirchen
20:15	Luginger 98'			Stadium: Parkstadion; Attendance: 14,000; Referee: Karl-Josef Assenmacher (Fischenich)

=== Intertoto Cup ===
26 June 1993 GS1	VfL Bochum	1–2	(Czechoslovakia) ŠK Slovan Bratislava
	Eitzert 84'		Tomaschek 60', 64'	Attendance: 8,000

4 July 1993 GS2	FC Tirol Innsbruck (Austria)	0–1	VfL Bochum
			Kim 9'	Attendance: 1,500

11 July 1993 GS3	Silkeborg IF (Denmark)	2–2	VfL Bochum
				Attendance: 500

17 July 1993 GS4	FC Zürich (Switzerland)	1–1	VfL Bochum
	Waas 11'		Helmig 78'	Attendance: 3,000

== Squad ==
=== Squad and statistics ===
==== Squad, appearances and goals scored ====
No.	Pos	Nat	Player	Total		2. Bundesliga		DFB-Pokal		Intertoto Cup	
No.	Pos	Nat	Player	Apps	Goals	Apps	Goals	Apps	Goals	Apps	Goals
	FW	(Germany) GER	Holger Aden	21	7	20	7	1	0		
	DF	(Germany) GER	Sven Christians	33	2	32	2	1	0		
	MF	(Portugal) POR	Paulo da Palma	15	0	14	0	1	0		
	DF	(Germany) GER	Olaf Dreßel	14	0	13	0	1	0		
	DF	(Germany) GER	Max Eberl	10	0	10	0	0	0		
	MF	(Germany) GER	Dirk Eitzert	13	0	13	0	0	0		
	FW	(Iceland) ISL	Þórður Guðjónsson	16	3	16	3	0	0		
	MF	(Germany) GER	Frank Heinemann	20	1	20	1	0	0		
	MF	(Germany) GER	Dirk Helmig	29	1	28	1	1	0		
	DF	(Germany) GER	Christian Herrmann	34	2	33	2	1	0		
	DF	(Germany) GER	Michael Hubner	19	1	19	1	0	0		
	DF	(Germany) GER	Thomas Kempe	0	0	0	0	0	0		
	FW	(South Korea) KOR	Chu-sŏng Kim	22	4	21	4	1	0		
	FW	(Germany) GER	Robert Mawick	1	0	1	0	0	0		
	MF	(Germany) GER	Kai Michalke	12	2	12	2	0	0		
	FW	(Germany) GER	Rocco Milde	2	0	2	0	0	0		
	MF	(Germany) GER	Peter Peschel	30	2	29	2	1	0		
	DF	(Netherlands) NED	Rob Reekers	26	1	25	1	1	0		
	MF	(Germany) GER	Michael Rzehaczek	0	0	0	0	0	0		
	MF	(Germany) GER	Jörg Schwanke	25	0	25	0	0	0		
	DF	(Germany) GER	Uwe Stöver	38	4	37	4	1	0		
	DF	(Germany) GER	Markus von Ahlen	15	2	15	2	0	0		
	MF	(Germany) GER	Uwe Wegmann	31	22	30	22	1	0		
	GK	(Germany) GER	Andreas Wessels	38	0	37	0	1	0		
	MF	(Germany) GER	Dariusz Wosz	35	3	34	3	1	0		
	GK	(Germany) GER	Ralf Zumdick	1	0	1	0	0	0		

=== Transfers ===
==== Summer ====
In:

No.	Pos.	Nation	Player
—	MF	POR	Paulo da Palma (from VfL Osnabrück)
—	DF	GER	Max Eberl (from FC Bayern Munich)
—	FW	ISL	Þórður Guðjónsson (from Íþróttabandalag Akraness)
—	DF	GER	Michael Hubner (from FC 08 Homburg)
—	MF	GER	Kai Michalke (from VfL Bochum U-19)
—	DF	GER	Markus von Ahlen (from Bayer 04 Leverkusen)

Out:

No.	Pos.	Nation	Player
—	MF	GER	Heiko Bonan (to Karlsruher SC)
—	FW	GER	Thomas Epp (to Stuttgarter Kickers)
—	DF	FRA	Patrick Guillou (to Stade Rennais F.C.)
—	FW	GER	Michael Klauß (to Rot-Weiß Oberhausen)
—	FW	GRE	Dimitrios Moutas (to Stuttgarter Kickers)
—	MF	GER	Christian Zetzmann (to SpVgg Beckum)
