= 1994–95 VfL Bochum season =

VfL Bochum
1994–95 season
- President: Werner Altegoer
- Head Coach: Jürgen Gelsdorf (until 6 November 1994); Klaus Toppmöller (since 9 November 1994)
- Stadium: Ruhrstadion
- Bundesliga: 16th (relegated)
- DFB-Pokal: Second Round
- Top goalscorer: League: Wegmann (11); All: Wegmann (13)
- Highest home attendance: 38,000 (vs FC Bayern Munich, 18 February 1995; vs Borussia Möchengladbach, 25 March 1995)
- Lowest home attendance: 14,490 (vs VfB Stuttgart, 20 May 1995)
- Average home league attendance: 24,585
Home colours	Away colours	Third colours

The 1994–95 VfL Bochum season was the 57th season in club history.

== Review and events ==
On 6 November 1994 head coach Jürgen Gelsdorf was sacked. Klaus Toppmöller was appointed head coach on 9 November 1992.

== Matches ==
=== Legend ===
Win Draw Loss

=== Bundesliga ===
20 August 1994 1	FC Bayern Munich	3 – 1	VfL Bochum	Munich
15:30	Scholl 67'; Helmer 72'; Nerlinger 73'		Aden 87'	Stadium: Olympiastadion; Attendance: 54,000; Referee: Edgar Steinborn (Sinzig)

23 August 1994 2	VfL Bochum	2 – 0	Dynamo Dresden	Bochum
20:00	Aden 31' von Ahlen 75'			Stadium: Ruhrstadion; Attendance: 20,000; Referee: Lutz Wagner (Kriftel)

27 August 1994 3	SV Werder Bremen	3 – 0	VfL Bochum	Bremen
15:30	Basler 69', 82', 88'			Stadium: Weserstadion; Attendance: 22,400; Referee: Winfried Buchhart (Schrobenhausen)

3 September 1994 4	VfL Bochum	1 – 3	Bayer 04 Leverkusen	Bochum
15:30	Aden 63'		Kirsten 42', 75'; Völler 61'	Stadium: Ruhrstadion; Attendance: 22,746; Referee: Wolf-Günter Wiesel (Ottbergen)

16 September 1994 5	VfL Bochum	1 – 3	SC Freiburg	Bochum
20:00	Aden 57'		Cardoso 2'; Spies 34', 90'	Stadium: Ruhrstadion; Attendance: 16,334; Referee: Alfons Berg (Konz)

24 September 1994 6	Borussia Mönchengladbach	7 – 1	VfL Bochum	Mönchengladbach
15:30	Effenberg 16', 85'; Kastenmaier 23'; Herrlich 27'; Wynhoff 38'; Salou 50'; Schneider 78'		Heinemann 68' (pen.)	Stadium: Bökelbergstadion; Attendance: 26,000; Referee: Hermann Albrecht (Kaufbeuren)

30 September 1994 7	VfL Bochum	1 – 0	MSV Duisburg	Bochum
20:00	Guðjónsson 90'			Stadium: Ruhrstadion; Attendance: 24,117; Referee: Bernhard Zerr (Ottersweier)

9 October 1994 8	Hamburger SV	3 – 1	VfL Bochum	Hamburg
18:00	Spörl 32' (pen.), 50'; Letchkov 42'		Guðjónsson 21'	Stadium: Volksparkstadion; Attendance: 28,000; Referee: Lutz Michael Fröhlich (Berlin)

14 October 1994 9	VfL Bochum	2 – 2	TSV 1860 Munich	Bochum
20:00	Wegmann 45' da Palma 59'		Trares 76'; Schneider 82' (o.g.)	Stadium: Ruhrstadion; Attendance: 23,882; Referee: Hartmut Strampe (Handorf)

21 October 1994 10	1. FC Köln	2 – 1	VfL Bochum	Cologne
20:00	Rudy 5'; Polster 28' (pen.)		Wegmann 24'	Stadium: Radrennbahn Müngersdorf; Attendance: 25,000; Referee: Michael Malbranc (Hamburg)

28 October 1994 11	VfL Bochum	0 – 2	1. FC Kaiserslautern	Bochum
20:00			Sforza 22'; Brehme 36' (pen.)	Stadium: Ruhrstadion; Attendance: 22,573; Referee: Manfred Schmidt (Bad Hersfeld)

5 November 1994 12	Eintracht Frankfurt	2 – 1	VfL Bochum	Frankfurt am Main
15:30	Yeboah 41', 60'		Guðjónsson 80'	Stadium: Waldstadion; Attendance: 20,000; Referee: Frank Fleske (Eisenhüttenstadt)

11 November 1994 13	VfL Bochum	0 – 2	Borussia Dortmund	Bochum
20:00			Riedle 29'; Chapuisat 67'	Stadium: Ruhrstadion; Attendance: 37,000; Referee: Günther Habermann (Weißensee)

19 November 1994 14	VfB Stuttgart	2 – 2	VfL Bochum	Stuttgart
15:30	Dunga 20'; Kruse 50'		Wegmann 44'; Frontzeck 89'	Stadium: Gottlieb-Daimler-Stadion; Attendance: 16,000; Referee: Wolf-Günter Wiesel (Ottbergen)

25 November 1994 15	VfL Bochum	2 – 1	Bayer 05 Uerdingen	Bochum
20:00	Wałdoch 31'; Wegmann 56' (pen.)		Paßlack 86'	Stadium: Ruhrstadion; Attendance: 22,000; Referee: Hans Scheuerer (Munich)

4 December 1994 16	FC Schalke 04	3 – 2	VfL Bochum	Gelsenkirchen
18:00	Anderbrügge 29' (pen.); Látal 36'; Herzog 86'		Bałuszyński 45', 51'	Stadium: Parkstadion; Attendance: 45,000; Referee: Hermann Albrecht (Kaufbeuren)

29 November 1994 17	VfL Bochum	0 – 1	Karlsruher SC	Bochum
20:00			Schmitt 36'	Stadium: Ruhrstadion; Attendance: 22,494; Referee: Frank Kiefer (Baunatal)

18 February 1995 18	VfL Bochum	1 – 2	FC Bayern Munich	Bochum
15:30	Herrmann 72'		Kostadinov 37'; Helmer 49'	Stadium: Ruhrstadion; Attendance: 38,000; Referee: Edgar Steinborn (Sinzig)

24 February 1995 19	Dynamo Dresden	0 – 2	VfL Bochum	Dresden
20:00			Bałuszyński 19'; Peschel 87'	Stadium: Rudolf-Harbig-Stadion; Attendance: 19,000; Referee: Bernhard Zerr (Ottersweier)

3 March 1995 20	VfL Bochum	1 – 3	SV Werder Bremen	Bochum
20:00	Bałuszyński 1'		Beschastnykh 33', 37'; Basler 83'	Stadium: Ruhrstadion; Attendance: 25,193; Referee: Lutz Wagner (Kriftel)

11 March 1995 21	Bayer 04 Leverkusen	1 – 3	VfL Bochum	Leverkusen
15:30	Scholz 87'		Michalke 8'; Wegmann 34'; Wörns 41' (o.g.)	Stadium: Ulrich-Haberland-Stadion; Attendance: 21,800; Referee: Manfred Schmidt (Bad Hersfeld)

18 March 1995 22	SC Freiburg	1 – 2	VfL Bochum	Freiburg
15:30	Wassmer 86'		Wegmann 17' (pen.); Wosz 63'	Stadium: Dreisamstadion; Attendance: 18,000; Referee: Volkmar Fischer (St. Wendel)

25 March 1995 23	VfL Bochum	0 – 2	Borussia Mönchengladbach	Bochum
15:30			Kastenmaier 12'; Herrlich 78'	Stadium: Ruhrstadion; Attendance: 38,000; Referee: Frank Fleske (Eisenhüttenstadt)

31 March 1995 24	MSV Duisburg	3 – 1	VfL Bochum	Duisburg
19:30	Krohm 29'; Schütterle 48'; Marin 64' (pen.)		Wałdoch 28'	Stadium: Wedaustadion; Attendance: 20,000; Referee: Jürgen Aust (Cologne)

7 April 1995 25	VfL Bochum	0 – 0	Hamburger SV	Bochum
20:00				Stadium: Ruhrstadion; Attendance: 22,000; Referee: Hans-Peter Best (Kämpfelbach)

16 April 1995 26	TSV 1860 Munich	4 – 0	VfL Bochum	Munich
18:00	Rydlewicz 21'; Winkler 29', 37'; Trares 69'			Stadium: Stadion an der Grünwalder Straße; Attendance: 28,500; Referee: Markus Merk (Otterbach)

21 April 1995 27	VfL Bochum	1 – 0	1. FC Köln	Bochum
20:00	Frontzeck 48'			Stadium: Ruhrstadion; Attendance: 25,012; Referee: Lutz Michael Fröhlich (Berlin)

29 April 1995 28	1. FC Kaiserslautern	3 – 1	VfL Bochum	Kaiserslautern
15:30	Marschall 18'; Hamann 35'; Kuka 47'		Wałdoch 74'	Stadium: Fritz-Walter-Stadion; Attendance: 37,075; Referee: Hans-Joachim Osmers (Bremen)

6 May 1995 29	VfL Bochum	0 – 1	Eintracht Frankfurt	Bochum
15:30			Komljenović 44'	Stadium: Ruhrstadion; Attendance: 19,037; Referee: Hartmut Strampe (Handorf)

13 May 1995 30	Borussia Dortmund	3 – 1	VfL Bochum	Dortmund
15:30	Zorc 54' (pen.); Möller 57'; Reuter 81'		Wegmann 64'	Stadium: Westfalenstadion; Attendance: 42,800; Referee: Hans-Jürgen Weber (Bielefeld)

20 May 1995 31	VfL Bochum	4 – 0	VfB Stuttgart	Bochum
15:30	Wałdoch 7'; Wegmann 32', 65' (pen.); Peschel 69'			Stadium: Ruhrstadion; Attendance: 14,490; Referee: Markus Merk (Otterbach)

27 May 1995 32	Bayer 05 Uerdingen	2 – 1	VfL Bochum	Krefeld
15:30	Feldhoff 54'; Krieg 90'		Peschel 81'	Stadium: Grotenburg-Stadion; Attendance: 23,149; Referee: Georg Dardenne (Nettersheim)

10 June 1995 33	VfL Bochum	5 – 1	FC Schalke 04	Bochum
15:30	Wosz 8'; Wegmann 27' (pen.), 54'; Heinemann 47'; Michalke 78'		Müller 19'	Stadium: Ruhrstadion; Attendance: 25,062; Referee: Michael Malbranc (Hamburg)

17 June 1995 34	Karlsruher SC	2 – 2	VfL Bochum	Karlsruhe
15:30	Reekers 68' (o.g.); Bonan 72'		Hubner 23'; Peschel 77'	Stadium: Wildparkstadion; Attendance: 25,000; Referee: Hans-Jürgen Kasper (Katlenburg)

=== DFB-Pokal ===
14 August 1994 R1	Rot-Weiss Essen	0 – 2 (a.e.t.)	VfL Bochum	Essen
15:30			Hubner 112'; Wegmann 115' (pen.)	Stadium: Georg-Melches-Stadion; Attendance: 17,000; Referee: Hans-Jürgen Kasper (Katlenburg)

10 September 1994 R2	SC Fortuna Köln	2 – 1 (a.e.t.)	VfL Bochum	Cologne
15:30	Fuchs 25'; Präger 112'		Wegmann 43'	Stadium: Südstadion; Attendance: 8,000; Referee: Hans-Jürgen Weber (Bielefeld)

== Squad ==
=== Squad and statistics ===
==== Squad, appearances and goals scored ====
No.	Pos	Nat	Player	Total		Bundesliga		DFB-Pokal	
No.	Pos	Nat	Player	Apps	Goals	Apps	Goals	Apps	Goals
	FW	(Germany) GER	Holger Aden	6	4	4	4	2	0
	FW	(Poland) POL	Henryk Bałuszyński	10	4	10	4	0	0
	DF	(Germany) GER	Sven Christians	17	0	15	0	2	0
	MF	(Portugal) POR	Paulo da Palma	11	1	10	1	1	0
	DF	(Germany) GER	Max Eberl	21	0	21	0	0	0
	MF	(Germany) GER	Dirk Eitzert	0	0	0	0	0	0
	MF	(Germany) GER	Michael Frontzeck	29	2	28	2	1	0
	MF	(Iceland) ISL	Þórður Guðjónsson	16	3	16	3	0	0
	MF	(Germany) GER	Frank Heinemann	14	2	13	2	1	0
	DF	(Germany) GER	Christian Herrmann	24	1	22	1	2	0
	DF	(Germany) GER	Michael Hubner	14	2	13	1	1	1
	MF	(Germany) GER	Robert Matiebel	4	0	4	0	0	0
	MF	(Germany) GER	Kai Michalke	25	2	24	2	1	0
	MF	(Germany) GER	Peter Peschel	24	4	23	4	1	0
	DF	(Netherlands) NED	Rob Reekers	11	0	11	0	0	0
	DF	(Germany) GER	Uwe Schneider	13	0	11	0	2	0
	DF	(Germany) GER	Jörg Schwanke	15	0	15	0	0	0
	DF	(Germany) GER	Uwe Stöver	27	0	25	0	2	0
	MF	(Germany) GER	Markus von Ahlen	16	1	14	1	2	0
	DF	(Poland) POL	Tomasz Wałdoch	25	4	25	4	0	0
	MF	(Germany) GER	Uwe Wegmann	35	13	33	11	2	2
	GK	(Germany) GER	Andreas Wessels	36	0	34	0	2	0
	MF	(Germany) GER	Andreas Wieczorek	1	0	1	0	0	0
	FW	(Germany) GER	Roland Wohlfarth	11	0	11	0	0	0
	MF	(Germany) GER	Dariusz Wosz	34	2	32	2	2	0
	FW	(United States) USA	Eric Wynalda	24	0	22	0	2	0
	GK	(Germany) GER	Ralf Zumdick	0	0	0	0	0	0

=== Transfers ===
==== Summer ====
In:

No.	Pos.	Nation	Player
—	FW	POL	Henryk Bałuszyński (from Górnik Zabrze)
—	MF	GER	Michael Frontzeck (from VfB Stuttgart)
—	DF	GER	Uwe Schneider (from VfB Stuttgart)
—	DF	POL	Tomasz Wałdoch (from Górnik Zabrze)
—	MF	GER	Andreas Wieczorek (from SV Langenau)
—	FW	GER	Roland Wohlfarth (from AS Saint-Étienne)
—	FW	USA	Eric Wynalda (from 1. FC Saarbrücken)

Out:

No.	Pos.	Nation	Player
—	MF	GER	Dirk Helmig (to Rot-Weiss Essen)
—	DF	GER	Thomas Kempe (retired)
—	FW	KOR	Chu-sŏng Kim (to Daewoo Royals)
—	MF	GER	Michael Rzehaczek (retired)
