= Helmig =

Helmig is a surname. Notable people with the surname include:

- Christian Helmig (born 1981), Luxembourgish cyclist
- Dirk Helmig (born 1965), German footballer and manager
- Hugo Helmig (born 1998), Danish singer-songwriter
- Thomas Helmig (born 1964), Danish rock singer and musician
