= Michael Klauß =

Michael Klauß may refer to:

- Michael Klauß (footballer, born 1970), German footballer
- Michael Klauß (footballer, born 1987), German footballer
