= Turr =

Turr or Türr may refer to:

- the milk skin consumed in Nepal
- Frank Türr (born 1970), a German retired football player
- István Türr (1825–1908), a Hungarian soldier and revolutionary
- Uria, a bird known in Newfoundland as Turr
