= Kontny =

Surname occurring mainly in Germany

Kontny is a surname occurring mainly in Germany. Notable people with the surname include:

- Dirk Kontny (born 1965), German footballer
- Mario Kontny (1953–2024), German footballer
- Paweł Kontny (1910–1945), Polish Roman Catholic priest, killed by Soviet soldiers
