= 1990–91 2. Bundesliga =

17th season of the second-tier football league in Germany

2. Bundesliga
- Season: 1990–91
- Champions: FC Schalke 04
- Promoted: FC Schalke 04; MSV Duisburg; Stuttgarter Kickers
- Relegated: Rot-Weiss Essen; Preußen Münster; TSV Havelse; FC Schweinfurt 05
- Matches: 380
- Top goalscorer: Michael Tönnies (29 goals)
- Average attendance: 7,166

The 1990–91 2. Bundesliga season was the seventeenth season of the 2. Bundesliga, the second tier of the German football league system. It was the last season in which the league consisted of West German clubs only. From 1991–92 onwards clubs from the former East Germany joined the league.

FC Schalke 04, MSV Duisburg and Stuttgarter Kickers were promoted to the Bundesliga while Rot-Weiss Essen, Preußen Münster, TSV Havelse and FC Schweinfurt 05 were relegated to the Oberliga.

== League table ==
For the 1990–91 season VfB Oldenburg, TSV Havelse, 1. FSV Mainz 05 and 1. FC Schweinfurt 05 were newly promoted to the 2. Bundesliga from the Oberliga while SV Waldhof Mannheim and FC 08 Homburg had been relegated to the league from the Bundesliga.

Locations of the participating teams of the 1990–91 season

Pos	Team	Pld	W	D	L	GF	GA	GD	Pts	Promotion or relegation
1	Schalke 04 (C, P)	38	23	11	4	64	29	+35	57	Promotion to Bundesliga
2	MSV Duisburg (P)	38	21	11	6	70	34	+36	53	Promotion to Bundesliga
3	Stuttgarter Kickers (P)	38	21	9	8	63	32	+31	51	Promotion to Bundesliga
4	FC Homburg	38	16	13	9	42	37	+5	45	
5	1. FC Saarbrücken	38	15	14	9	47	30	+17	44	
6	Blau-Weiß 90 Berlin	38	12	20	6	55	42	+13	44	
7	Waldhof Mannheim	38	15	12	11	60	47	+13	42	
8	Mainz 05	38	14	13	11	45	52	−7	41	
9	SC Freiburg	38	15	10	13	54	48	+6	40	
10	Hannover 96	38	12	14	12	49	49	0	38	
11	Fortuna Köln	38	11	15	12	51	53	−2	37	
12	VfB Oldenburg	38	10	16	12	58	53	+5	36	
13	Eintracht Braunschweig	38	12	11	15	53	52	+1	35	
14	VfL Osnabrück	38	12	11	15	51	55	−4	35	
15	Rot-Weiss Essen (Note: After the end of the season, Rot-Weiss Essen were denied a license and were therefore relegated as the fourth team. Darmstadt 98 remained in the second division.) (R)	38	12	10	16	49	52	−3	34	Relegation to Oberliga
16	SV Meppen	38	10	14	14	35	42	−7	34	
17	Darmstadt 98	38	10	13	15	46	54	−8	33	
18	Preußen Münster (R)	38	8	13	17	35	59	−24	29	Relegation to Oberliga
19	TSV Havelse (R)	38	6	7	25	44	82	−38	19	Relegation to Oberliga
20	FC Schweinfurt 05 (R)	38	2	9	27	26	95	−69	13	Relegation to Oberliga

Source: Bundesliga.de
Rules for classification: 1) points; 2) goal difference; 3) number of goals scored.
(C) Champions; (P) Promoted; (R) Relegated

== Results ==
Home \ Away	BWB	EBS	D98	DUI	RWE	SCF	H96	HAV	HOM	FKO	M05	WMA	SVM	PRM	OLD	OSN	FCS	S04	S05	SKI
Blau-Weiß 90 Berlin	—	0–0	2–0	2–2	2–2	2–1	1–1	3–1	4–1	0–0	2–1	2–1	2–0	1–1	1–1	0–0	1–1	1–1	6–1	1–1
Eintracht Braunschweig	2–2	—	1–0	1–1	0–0	2–2	0–1	3–1	1–0	3–2	5–1	1–1	0–0	5–0	1–1	1–0	0–1	0–1	3–0	2–1
Darmstadt 98	1–1	2–1	—	2–2	3–2	2–1	1–0	5–2	0–0	1–2	0–1	1–1	1–0	0–0	0–0	1–1	1–0	2–2	3–3	0–2
MSV Duisburg	1–0	3–3	2–0	—	4–2	1–0	4–2	3–0	4–0	3–0	2–0	1–1	4–0	5–0	1–0	2–1	1–0	1–1	2–1	2–0
Rot-Weiss Essen	0–3	3–1	3–0	1–1	—	3–0	4–2	3–0	0–0	0–2	2–0	1–1	3–2	1–0	1–3	0–0	1–1	0–0	4–0	0–2
SC Freiburg	0–0	3–2	1–2	0–2	4–0	—	1–1	1–0	0–0	2–0	2–1	0–2	2–1	3–2	1–1	0–1	0–0	3–0	3–1	1–0
Hannover 96	3–1	3–0	2–2	2–0	2–0	0–2	—	2–1	0–2	3–3	3–1	0–5	2–0	3–1	0–0	0–1	1–1	1–1	1–1	1–2
TSV Havelse	1–2	1–0	3–3	1–1	1–4	0–3	1–2	—	1–1	0–2	1–2	1–1	1–0	4–1	3–2	1–5	0–2	1–2	4–1	2–1
FC Homburg	2–0	1–0	1–0	2–1	2–1	1–0	1–1	2–1	—	3–2	0–0	1–1	0–0	2–1	1–0	2–3	0–0	2–1	6–1	2–0
Fortuna Köln	2–1	2–3	1–1	2–2	2–1	0–1	1–1	3–1	1–1	—	3–1	1–0	1–1	1–1	1–1	2–2	3–4	1–1	2–0	0–2
Mainz 05	2–2	1–4	1–1	1–1	1–0	0–0	2–1	2–1	0–2	1–3	—	3–1	2–1	0–0	2–0	3–2	1–0	1–1	2–0	3–3
Waldhof Mannheim	2–0	5–2	4–1	4–0	1–3	3–1	1–1	4–3	1–1	2–0	1–2	—	1–1	3–0	2–1	1–0	1–3	1–3	3–0	2–0
SV Meppen	0–0	1–0	2–1	0–1	1–0	4–1	1–1	2–0	3–0	1–1	1–1	0–0	—	1–1	0–0	1–1	0–0	2–0	2–1	1–2
Preußen Münster	0–2	1–1	1–0	2–0	0–0	1–1	0–1	2–1	0–0	2–0	2–3	0–0	0–1	—	3–1	2–2	1–0	0–3	5–0	0–0
VfB Oldenburg	3–5	2–3	3–0	1–1	2–0	2–2	1–1	2–2	1–0	2–0	1–2	5–0	2–2	4–0	—	3–2	0–1	0–0	3–0	1–1
VfL Osnabrück	1–1	2–0	1–4	0–2	1–1	1–4	1–1	3–2	1–0	0–1	0–0	1–0	3–2	3–1	3–3	—	0–2	0–3	2–0	2–3
1. FC Saarbrücken	0–0	4–1	1–0	0–1	2–0	2–3	1–0	0–0	0–0	1–1	0–0	0–0	2–0	4–1	4–1	2–1	—	1–1	5–2	0–0
Schalke 04	1–1	2–1	1–0	1–0	3–1	3–1	2–0	3–0	3–1	2–1	3–0	1–2	2–0	3–1	4–1	1–0	3–1	—	2–0	2–1
1. FC Schweinfurt	1–1	0–0	0–5	0–6	0–2	2–2	1–3	1–1	0–1	1–1	0–0	3–1	0–1	0–0	2–3	0–3	2–1	0–1	—	1–4
Stuttgarter Kickers	4–0	1–0	3–0	1–0	3–0	3–2	1–0	3–0	4–1	1–1	1–1	3–0	3–0	0–2	1–1	3–1	2–0	0–0	1–0	—

Source: DFB
Legend: Blue = home team win; Yellow = draw; Red = away team win.

== Top scorers ==
The league's top scorers:

Goals	Player	Team
29	(Germany) Michael Tönnies	MSV Duisburg
22	(Germany) Marcus Marin	Stuttgarter Kickers
21	(Germany) Thomas Adler	SpVgg Blau-Weiß 1890 Berlin
19	(Germany) Jochen Heisig	Hannover 96
16	(Germany) Niels Schlotterbeck	SC Freiburg
14	(Germany) Holger Aden	Eintracht Braunschweig
14	(Italy) Berardino Capocchiano	TSV Havelse
13	(Soviet Union) Aleksandr Borodyuk	FC Schalke 04
13	(Germany) Henrik Eichenauer	SV Darmstadt 98
13	(Greece) Dimitrios Moutas	Stuttgarter Kickers
13	(Germany) Jörg Wolff	SV Waldhof Mannheim
