= Western German Cup =

- Organiser(s): Western German Football Association
- Founded: 1949
- Abolished: 1974
- Region: North Rhine-Westphalia
- Qualifier for: DFB-Pokal
- Last champions: Arminia Bielefeld (2nd title)
- Most championships: Fortuna Düsseldorf (5 titles)

The Western German Cup (German: Westdeutscher Pokal) was a cup competition organised by the Western German Football Association, which was played from the 1949–50 season up to the 1973–74 season. The best teams then qualified for the following season of the DFB-Pokal. In the years 1954 to 1960, only the Western German Cup winner participated in the DFB-Pokal. In the 1954–55 season, there was no competition.

From 1960–61, no final took place. Instead the club which finished best in the DFB-Pokal took the spot. With the introduction of the Bundesliga, the Western German Cup was only intended for clubs below the Bundesliga from the 1965–66 season.

The last Western German Cup took place in the 1973–74 season. Since the introduction of the 2. Bundesliga in the 1974–75 season, the teams playing in the top two leagues directly qualify for the DFB-Pokal. Since then, the amateur teams now qualify through the Verbandspokal.

== Cup winners ==
(Final details listed if known)

- 1949–50: Rot-Weiß Oberhausen (3–0 against Preussen Krefeld)
- 1950–51: Sportfreunde Wanne-Eickel (5–4 (a.e.t.) against Hombrucher FV 09)
- 1951–52: Rot-Weiss Essen (no final)

Qualification for the DFB-Pokal-Half-Final:

- 1952–53: 1. FC Köln (2–0 against Rot-Weiss Essen)
- 1953–54: Schalke 04 (no final)
- 1954–55: not played
- 1955–56: Fortuna Düsseldorf (4–2 against Rot-Weiss Essen)
- 1956–57: Fortuna Düsseldorf (2–1 against Wuppertaler SV)
- 1957–58: Fortuna Düsseldorf (4–1 against 1. FC Köln)
- 1958–59: Schwarz-Weiß Essen (3–2 against Westfalia Herne)
- 1959–60: Borussia Mönchengladbach (3–1 against 1. FC Köln)

After placing in the DFB-Pokal:

- 1960–61: Hamborn 07 (no final)
- 1961–62: Fortuna Düsseldorf (no final)
- 1962–63: Borussia Dortmund (no final)
- 1963–64: 1. FC Köln
- 1964–65: Borussia Dortmund

Non-Bundesliga:

- 1965–66: Arminia Bielefeld (3–2 against Alemannia Aachen)
- 1966–67: Alemannia Aachen (2–1 against Schwarz-Weiß Essen)
- 1967–68: VfL Bochum
- 1968–69: Preußen Münster
- 1969–70: Wuppertaler SV
- 1970–71: Fortuna Düsseldorf
- 1971–72: Wuppertaler SV
- 1972–73: Rot-Weiss Essen
- 1973–74: Arminia Bielefeld (2–1 against Borussia Dortmund)

== Performance by club ==
Rank	Club	Wins	Year(s)
1	Fortuna Düsseldorf	5	1956, 1957, 1958, 1962, 1971
2	1. FC Köln	2	1953, 1964
2	Borussia Dortmund	2	1963, 1965
2	Arminia Bielefeld	2	1966, 1974
2	Wuppertaler SV	2	1970, 1972
2	Rot-Weiss Essen	2	1952, 1973
8	Schalke 04	1	1954
8	Rot-Weiß Oberhausen	1	1950
8	Borussia Mönchengladbach	1	1960
8	VfL Bochum	1	1968
8	Schwarz-Weiß Essen	1	1959
8	Preußen Münster	1	1969
8	Alemannia Aachen	1	1967
8	Hamborn 07	1	1961
8	Sportfreunde Wanne-Eickel	1	1951
