= Holger Osieck =

German football manager (born 1948)

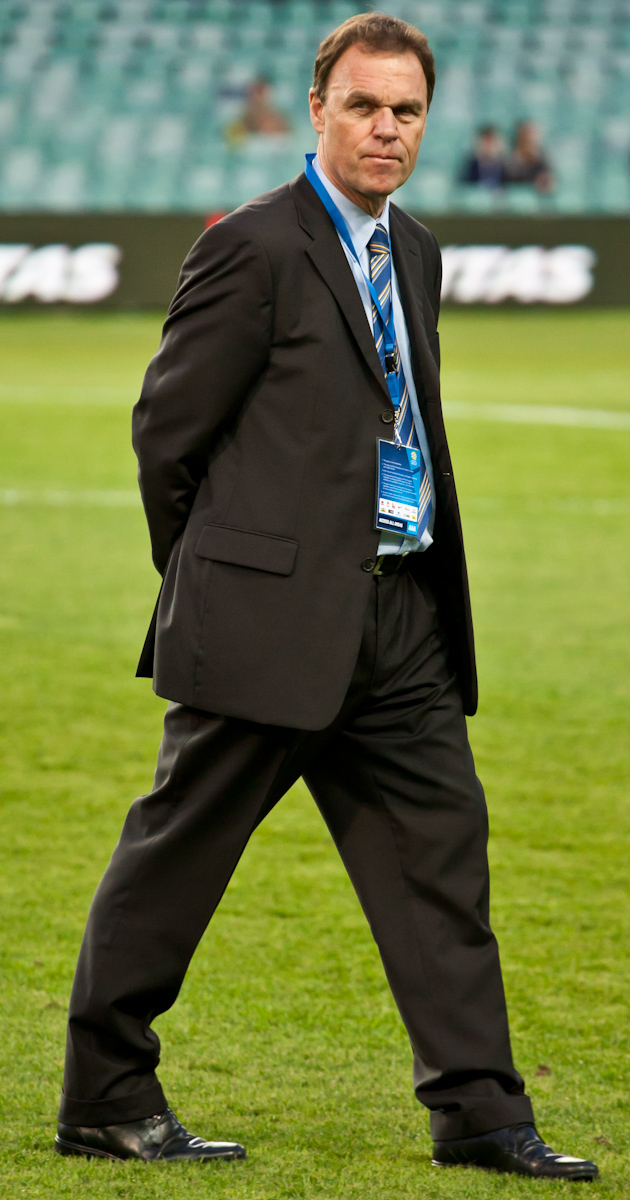

Personal information
- Full name: Holger Osieck
- Date of birth: 31 August 1948 (age 78)
- Place of birth: Duisburg, Allied-occupied Germany
- Position: Forward

Youth career
- 1958–1965: FC Schalke 04

Senior career*
Years	Team	Apps	(Gls)
1965–1970	Eintracht Gelsenkirchen		
1970–1972	SSV Hagen		
1972–1976	1. FC Mülheim	55	(11)
1976	1. FC Bocholt		
1977	Vancouver Whitecaps	21	(2)
1978	Rot-Weiß Oberhausen		

Managerial career
- 1978–1979: Canada (assistant)
- 1979–1987: West Germany (youth)
- 1987–1990: West Germany (assistant)
- 1990: FC Schalke 04 (youth)
- 1990–1991: Olympique Marseille (assistant)
- 1991–1992: VfL Bochum
- 1993–1994: Fenerbahçe
- 1995–1996: Urawa Red Diamonds
- 1997–1998: Kocaelispor
- 1998–2003: Canada
- 2007–2008: Urawa Red Diamonds
- 2010–2013: Australia
Medal record
Men's football
Representing Canada (as manager)
CONCACAF Gold Cup
Winner	2000 United States
Third place	2002 United States
Representing Australia (as manager)
AFC Asian Cup
Runner-up	2011
- * Club domestic league appearances and goals

Holger Osieck (born 31 August 1948) is a German former football manager who last managed the Australia national team. Prior to the Australian role, he most recently managed J. League club Urawa Red Diamonds, where he won the 2007 AFC Champions League. He served as an assistant coach of the West Germany national football team when they won the 1990 FIFA World Cup. He also led Canada in winning the 2000 CONCACAF Gold Cup.

== Playing career ==
In his native country, he played for FC Schalke 04, Eintracht Gelsenkirchen, SSV Hagen, 1. FC Mülheim, 1. FC Bocholt and Rot-Weiß Oberhausen. However, he never appeared in a top-flight Bundesliga match. Toward the end of his playing career, he moved to Canada to play for the Vancouver Whitecaps.

== Managerial career ==
=== Early career ===
After finishing his playing career in Canada, Osieck became an assistant coach to Franz Beckenbauer for the Germany that won the 1990 FIFA World Cup. He then managed VfL Bochum, Fenerbahçe, the Urawa Red Diamonds, and Kocaelispor.

With Bochum, he started on 1 July 1991. His first match was a 2–2 draw against 1. FC Köln. Bochum finished the 1991–92 season in 15th place and were eliminated in the second round of the German Cup. Bochum started the 1992–93 season with a 2–2 draw against Borussia Dortmund. Osieck left Bochum on 2 November 1992 and had his last match on 31 October 1992, a 3–1 loss to 1. FC Kaiserslautern. Bochum were in last place when Osieck left the club.

Osieck became manager of Fenerbahçe on 1 July 1993. In the 1993–94 season, Fenerbahçe finished in second place in the league and got to the quarter-finals of the Turkish Cup. During the 1994–95 season, Fenerbahçe participated in the UEFA Cup, where they were eliminated in the first round by Cannes. Osieck left on Fenerbahçe 18 December 1994. His final match was a 1–1 draw against Gaziantepspor on 17 December 1994. Fenerbahçe were in fourth place when he left the club.

Osieck was manager of Urawa Red Diamonds between 1 January 1995 and 31 December 1996. The Red Diamonds finished the season in third place and got to the quarter-finals of the Emperor's Cup. During the 1996 season, the Red Diamonds got to the semi-finals of the Emperor's Cup and were eliminated in the group stage of the League Cup.

Osieck was manager of Kocaelispor from 1 January 1997 to 30 June 1998. His first match was a 1–1 draw against Gaziantepspor on 18 January 1997. Kocaelispor finished the season in seventh place. They also won the Turkish Cup. In the 1997–98 season, Kocaelispor participated in the Cup Winners' Cup, where they were knocked out in the second round. Kocaelispor finished the season in 10th place. They were knocked out of the Turkish Cup in the semi-finals.

=== Canada and Urawa Red Diamonds ===
Osieck landed the job of manager of the Canadian men's national soccer team in September 1998. His first match didn't come until 1999 when Canada played to a 1–1 draw against Northern Ireland. His first two wins came against Guatemala when Canada won 1–0 on 28 May 1999 and 2–0 on 1 June 1999. In 2000, Canada participated in qualifying for the 2002 FIFA World Cup. Canada eliminated Cuba. However, Canada finished third behind Trinidad and Tobago and Mexico and were eliminated from the tournament. Under Osieck, Canada won the 2000 CONCACAF Gold Cup, earning the nickname "Holger's Heroes," a reference to the television show Hogan's Heroes. They defeated Colombia in the final. In 2001, Canada participated in the Confederations Cup. In the Confederations Cup, Canada lost to Japan and Cameroon and drew Brazil 0–0. Canada finished in last place in Group B. In 2002, Canada participated in the Gold Cup where Canada defeated South Korea in the third place match. Osieck resigned in September 2003. His final match was a 2–0 loss to Cuba in the 2003 CONCACAF Gold Cup.

He worked for FIFA between 2004 and 2006 as chief of their technical department. In 2007, he again became the manager of Urawa and led the club to win the 2007 AFC Champions League. Under Osieck, Urawa finished third in the 2007 FIFA Club World Cup. However, he was fired by Urawa on 16 March 2008, after a poor start to the 2008 season. Urawa were in 17th place when Osieck was sacked.

=== Australia ===
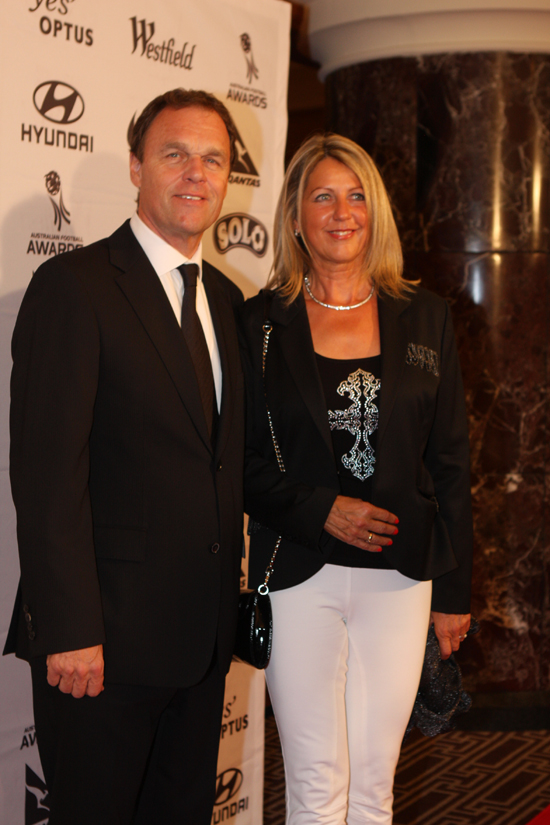
Holger and Elizabeth Osieck (2011)

On 11 August 2010, Osieck was named as the head coach of the Australia, replacing Pim Verbeek, who stepped down as Australia's coach after the 2010 FIFA World Cup. This role also involves actively assisting youth development. His first game as Australia's coach was against Switzerland, with Australia drawing 0–0. His first win as Australia's coach was a 2–1 win against Poland. Australia then proceeded to defeat Paraguay 1–0, before suffering a 3–0 loss to Egypt in Cairo.

In January 2011, he led the team to the final of the AFC Asian Cup, before an extra-time loss to Japan 1–0, with Australia conceding just two goals for the entire tournament. Osieck was widely praised for an otherwise outstanding campaign that included a victory over defending champions Iraq in the quarter-finals, and an amazing 6–0 defeat of Uzbekistan in the semi-finals.

On 30 March 2011, Osieck lead Australia to a shock 2–1 victory over his home country Germany in an international friendly match at Mönchengladbach. Australia were without their top goal scorer Tim Cahill but managed to score two goals in quick succession midway through the second half with Germany playing a weakened side with coach Joachim Löw playing a younger squad. Australia remained to be the only team to defeat Germany at home or away in 2011. Out of 17 games played in 2011, Australia achieved 12 wins, three draws and two losses.

In 2013, in World Cup qualifying, Australia defeated Saudi Arabia and Iraq.

On 18 June 2013, Osieck precipitated a bout of conniptions from Australian talisman Tim Cahill and enraged Australian fans by substituting him in the 78th minute of the 2014 World Cup Qualifier against Iraq. His decision was to be vindicated, however, with the tactical substitution of Joshua Kennedy scoring the decisive goal in the 83rd minute and hoisting Australia to a third successive World Cup berth.

On 12 October 2013, after two consecutive 6–0 defeats in friendly matches against Brazil and France, Osieck's contract was terminated with the FFA.

== Managerial statistics ==
=== Managerial record ===
As of 9 January 2017.

Team	From	To	Record								
Team	From	To	M	W	D	L	GF	GA	GD	Win %	Ref.
Bochum	1 July 1991	2 November 1992	53	12	17	24	27	79	−52	22.64	
Fenerbahçe	1 July 1993	18 December 1994	53	33	10	10	121	57	+64	62.26	
Urawa Red Diamonds	1 January 1995	31 December 1996	71	40	2	29	112	82	+30	56.34	
Kocaelispor	1 January 1997	30 June 1998	67	23	21	23	80	76	+4	34.33	
Canada	30 September 1998	2 September 2003	43	17	10	16	39	49	−10	39.53	
Urawa Red Diamonds	1 January 2007	15 March 2008	53	26	18	9	80	52	+28	49.06	
Australia	11 August 2010	12 October 2013	44	23	10	11	85	49	+36	52.27	
Total			384	174	88	122	544	444	+100	45.31	—

=== Year-to-year results ===
==== Club ====
Club	Season	League									Cup	L. Cup	Europe	Other	Ref.
Club	Season	League	M	W	D	L	GF	GA	Win %	Pos.	Pos.	Pos.	Pos.	Pos.	Ref.
Bochum	1991–92	Bundesliga	38	10	13	15	38	55	26.32	15th	S.R.	—			
Bochum	1992–93	Bundesliga	12	1	4	7	13	19	8.33	18th	S.R.	—			
Bochum	Totals		50	11	17	22	51	74	22.00	—					
Fenerbahçe	1993–94	Süper Lig	30	21	6	3	69	26	70.00	2nd	Q.F.	—	—	—	
Fenerbahçe	1994–95	Süper Lig	17	9	4	4	40	19	52.94	4th	—	—	F.R.	—	
Fenerbahçe	Totals		47	30	10	7	109	45	63.83	—					
Urawa Red Diamonds	1995	J1 League	26	15	0	11	41	34	57.69	3rd	Q.F.	—	—		
Urawa Red Diamonds	1996	J1 League	30	19	0	11	51	31	63.33	6th	S.F.	G.S.	—		
Urawa Red Diamonds	Totals		56	34	0	22	92	65	60.71	—					
Kocaelispor	1996–97	Süper Lig	17	4	9	4	16	17	23.53	7th	W	—	—	—	
Kocaelispor	1997–98	Süper Lig	34	12	7	15	46	46	35.29	10th	S.F.	—	S.R.	—	
Kocaelispor	Totals		51	16	16	19	62	63	31.37	—					
Urawa Red Diamonds	2007	J1 League	34	20	10	4	55	28	58.82	2nd			W	W T.P.	
Urawa Red Diamonds	2008	J1 League	2	0	0	2	0	3	0.00	17th	—				
Urawa Red Diamonds	Totals		36	20	10	6	55	31	55.56	—					
Career totals			240	111	53	76	369	278	46.25	—					

==== National teams ====
Team	Year	Competitions								Friendly matches							Ref.
Team	Year	Competition(s)	M	W	D	L	GF	GA	Win %	M	W	D	L	GF	GA	Win %	Ref.
Canada	1998	—	0	0	0	0	0	0	—	0	0	0	0	0	0	—	
Canada	1999	—	0	0	0	0	0	0	—	7	3	1	3	6	6	42.86	
Canada	2000	World Cup qualifying Gold Cup	13	5	5	3	9	11	38.46	4	3	1	0	5	1	75.00	
Canada	2001	Confederations Cup	3	0	1	2	0	5	0.00	3	1	0	2	2	5	33.33	
Canada	2002	Gold Cup	5	2	2	1	5	4	40.00	2	1	0	1	4	4	50.00	
Canada	2003	Gold Cup	2	1	0	1	2	1	50.00	4	1	0	3	6	12	25.00	
Canada	Totals		23	8	8	7	16	21	34.78	20	9	2	9	23	28	45.00	—
Australia	2010	—	0	0	0	0	0	0	—	4	2	1	1	3	4	50.00	
Australia	2011	World Cup qualifying Asian Cup	11	8	1	2	22	5	72.73	6	4	2	0	12	2	66.67	
Australia	2012	World Cup qualifying	5	2	2	1	8	6	40.00	8	5	1	2	25	7	62.50	
Australia	2013	World Cup qualifying	4	2	2	0	8	3	50.00	6	0	1	5	7	22	0.00	
Australia	Totals		20	12	5	3	38	14	60.00	24	11	5	8	47	35	45.83	—
Career totals			43	20	13	10	54	35	46.51	44	20	7	17	70	63	45.45	—

== Honours ==
Fenerbahçe

- Prime Minister's Cup: 1993

Kocaelispor

- Turkish Cup: 1996–97

Urawa Red Diamonds

- AFC Champions League: 2007

Canada

- CONCACAF Gold Cup: 2000; 3rd place, 2002

Australia

- AFC Asian Cup: runner-up 2011
