= 1990 Danish 1st Division =

45th season of Danish 1st Division

Danish 1st Division
- Season: 1990
- Champions: Brøndby IF
- Relegated: Næstved IF; Herfølge BK; Kjøbenhavns BK; Viborg FF
- European Cup: Brøndby IF
- UEFA Cup: B 1903; Ikast FS
- Matches: 338
- Goals: 455 (1.35 per match)
- Top goalscorer: Bent Christensen (17 goals)

The 1990 Danish 1st Division season was the 45th season of the Danish 1st Division, and the last in which it was the country's top flight. At the end of the season the new Danish Superliga was formed as the country's new top division.

The champions qualified for the 1991–92 European Cup qualification, while the second and third placed teams qualified for the qualification round of the 1991–92 UEFA Cup. The four lowest placed teams of the tournament was directly relegated to the (now second-tier) Danish 1st Division, while the teams placed ninth and tenth played qualification games against the champions and runners-up in the 2nd Division.

== Table ==
Pos	Team	Pld	W	D	L	GF	GA	GD	Pts
1	Brøndby IF	26	17	8	1	50	16	+34	42
2	B 1903	26	10	11	5	44	27	+17	31
3	Ikast FS	26	11	8	7	38	27	+11	30
4	Silkeborg IF	26	11	8	7	35	26	+9	30
5	BK Frem	26	7	15	4	33	25	+8	29
6	Lyngby BK	26	10	8	8	44	30	+14	28
7	Aarhus GF	26	9	10	7	31	25	+6	28
8	Odense BK	26	9	9	8	32	28	+4	27
9	Vejle BK	26	8	10	8	32	32	0	26
10	Aalborg BK	26	8	10	8	32	34	−2	26
11	Næstved IF	26	6	10	10	20	34	−14	22
12	Herfølge BK	26	4	9	13	21	47	−26	17
13	KB	26	4	6	16	24	52	−28	14
14	Viborg FF	26	5	4	17	19	52	−33	14

Source: RSSSF

== Results ==
Home \ Away	AaB	AGF	B03	BIF	BKF	HBK	IFS	KBK	LBK	NIF	OB	SIF	VBK	VFF
Aalborg BK	—	2–1	2–1	1–3	1–0	1–1	2–2	2–1	0–1	1–0	1–2	1–1	1–1	0–0
Aarhus GF	0–2	—	1–4	1–2	1–1	4–0	1–1	1–0	1–3	0–0	0–0	3–1	1–0	2–0
B 1903	1–0	1–1	—	1–3	1–1	2–1	2–2	3–3	2–0	2–0	2–0	2–0	0–0	7–0
Brøndby IF	2–2	1–1	2–2	—	1–0	4–0	2–0	1–0	2–0	0–0	3–0	2–0	4–2	4–1
BK Frem	2–2	0–0	1–1	1–0	—	3–3	1–0	1–1	0–0	1–1	1–1	1–2	2–2	3–1
Herfølge BK	3–3	0–0	1–2	0–0	1–1	—	1–0	2–6	0–2	0–1	1–0	1–1	2–1	1–0
Ikast FS	4–0	0–1	3–1	0–0	1–1	4–1	—	0–0	1–2	3–1	1–0	1–0	1–0	5–1
Kjøbenhavns BK	2–1	0–4	0–3	0–1	0–5	0–0	1–2	—	2–2	0–2	1–2	1–2	2–1	2–2
Lyngby BK	2–2	0–1	0–0	2–3	3–0	1–0	2–3	2–0	—	2–2	2–0	1–2	0–1	5–1
Næstved IF	0–2	3–2	0–0	1–4	0–0	0–0	1–1	0–1	0–6	—	2–0	0–0	2–0	0–0
Odense BK	1–1	0–0	0–0	0–3	0–2	7–1	1–1	4–0	2–2	3–1	—	1–0	0–0	3–1
Silkeborg IF	1–0	2–2	2–1	1–1	1–2	1–0	2–0	4–0	2–2	3–0	0–1	—	2–2	1–0
Vejle BK	2–1	2–1	2–2	0–0	1–1	2–1	3–0	2–0	1–1	2–1	1–1	1–4	—	2–0
Viborg FF	0–1	0–1	2–1	0–2	0–2	1–0	0–2	3–1	2–1	1–2	1–3	0–0	2–1	—

Legend: Blue = home team win; Yellow = draw; Red = away team win.

== Top goalscorers ==
Position	Player	Club	Goals
1	Bent Christensen	Brøndby IF	17
