= Laura Radke =

German footballer (born 1999)

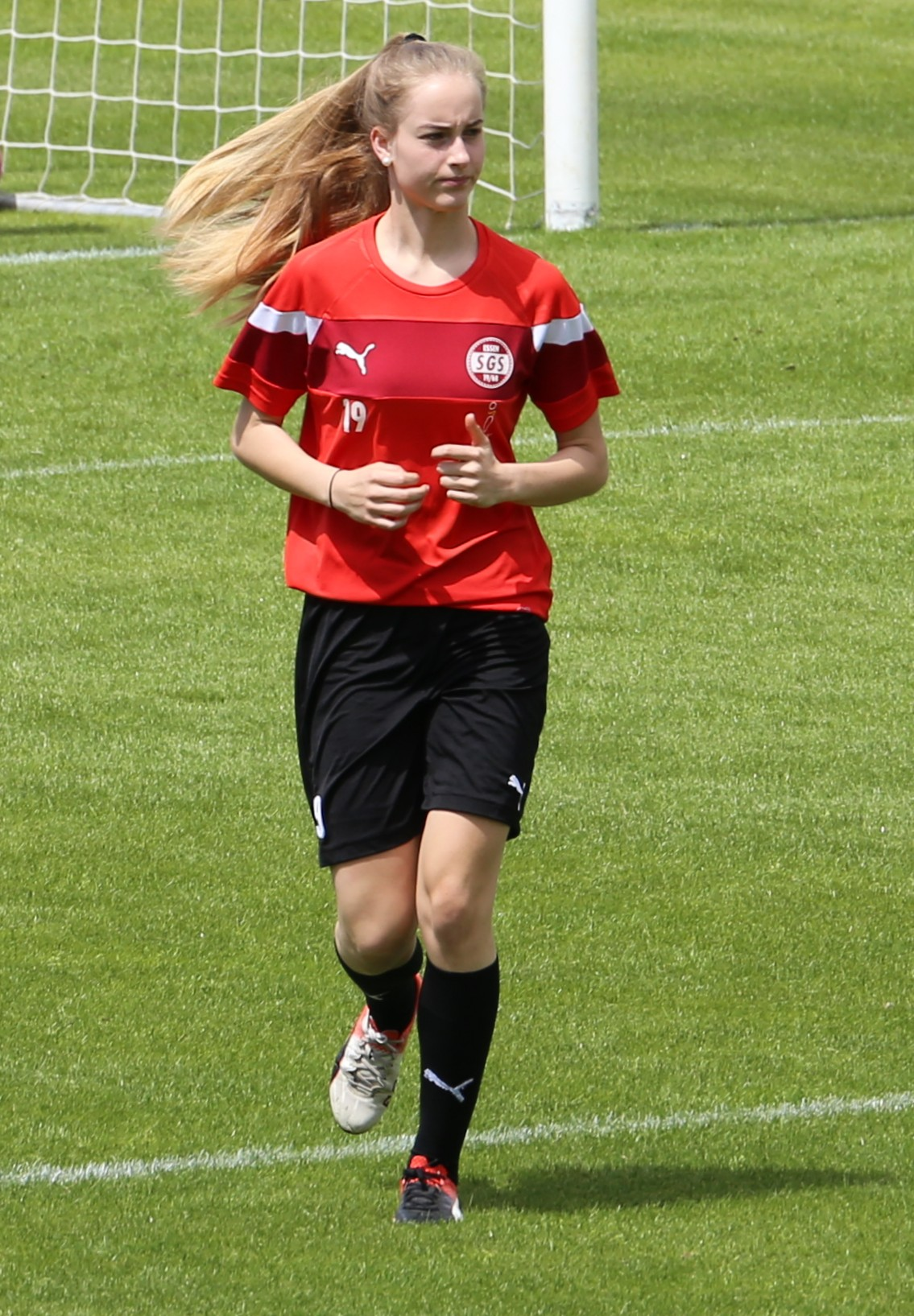
- Radke in 2017

Personal information
- Date of birth: 12 July 1999 (age 27)
- Place of birth: Herten, Germany
- Height: 1.70 m (5 ft 7 in)
- Position: Midfielder

Team information
- Current team: Borussia Mönchengladbach
- Number: 10

Youth career
- 2014–2015: Bochum
- 2015–2016: Essen

Senior career*
Years	Team	Apps	(Gls)
2016–2018	Essen	8	(1)
2016–2018	Essen II	9	(2)
2018–2019	Bayer Leverkusen	3	(0)
2019–2020	Duisburg	1	(0)
2020–2022	VfL Bochum	38	(25)
2022–2023	Turbine Potsdam	6	(0)
2022–2023	Turbine Potsdam II	6	(2)
2023–2025	Borussia Mönchengladbach	40	(10)

International career^{‡}
2016	Germany U17	4	(0)
- * Club domestic league appearances and goals as of 2 June 2024 ‡ National team caps and goals as of 6 September 2023

Laura Radke (born 12 July 1999) is a German footballer who plays for Borussia Mönchengladbach.
