= Paulo da Palma =

German-born Portuguese footballer

Personal information
- Full name: Paulo da Palma
- Date of birth: 18 March 1965 (age 61)
- Place of birth: Nordhorn, West Germany
- Height: 1.88 m (6 ft 2 in)
- Position: Midfielder

Youth career
- –1985: Eintracht Nordhorn

Senior career*
Years	Team	Apps	(Gls)
1985–1986	Eintracht Nordhorn		
1986–1992	VfB Oldenburg		
1992–1993	VfL Osnabrück	34	(9)
1993–1995	VfL Bochum	24	(1)
1995–1999	1. FC Saarbrücken	117	(10)
2000	FC Homburg	9	(0)
- * Club domestic league appearances and goals

Paulo da Palma (born 18 March 1965) is a German-born Portuguese former professional footballer who played as a midfielder.

== Career statistics ==
Appearances and goals by club, season and competition
Club	Season	League			DFB-Pokal		Total	
Club	Season	Division	Apps	Goals	Apps	Goals	Apps	Goals
Eintracht Nordhorn	1985–86	Verbandsliga Niedersachsen			—			
VfB Oldenburg	1986–87	Oberliga Nord			—			
VfB Oldenburg	1987–88	Oberliga Nord			2	0		
VfB Oldenburg	1988–89	Oberliga Nord			—			
VfB Oldenburg	1989–90	Oberliga Nord			—			
VfB Oldenburg	1990–91	2. Bundesliga	30	4	—		30	4
VfB Oldenburg	1991–92	2. Bundesliga	17	2	1	0	18	2
VfB Oldenburg	Total				3	0		
VfL Osnabrück	1992–93	2. Bundesliga	34	9	3	2	37	11
VfL Bochum	1993–94	2. Bundesliga	14	0	1	0	15	0
VfL Bochum	1994–95	Bundesliga	10	1	1	0	11	1
VfL Bochum	Total		24	1	2	0	26	1
1. FC Saarbrücken	1995–96	Regionalliga West	36	2	1	0	37	2
1. FC Saarbrücken	1996–97	Regionalliga West	36	5	0	0	36	5
1. FC Saarbrücken	1997–98	Regionalliga West	22	2	0	0	22	2
1. FC Saarbrücken	1998–99	Regionalliga West	23	1	1	0	24	1
1. FC Saarbrücken	1999–00	Regionalliga West	0	0	0	0	0	0
1. FC Saarbrücken	Total		117	10	2	0	119	10
FC Homburg	1999–00	Oberliga Südwest	9	0	—		9	0
Career total					10	2		
