= Robert Mawick =

German footballer

Personal information
- Full name: Robert Mawick
- Date of birth: 9 January 1967 (age 59)
- Position: Forward

Senior career*
Years	Team	Apps	(Gls)
1993–1994	VfL Bochum	1	(0)
- * Club domestic league appearances and goals

Robert Mawick (born 9 January 1967) is a retired German football forward.
