= Michael Tönnies =

German footballer

Personal information
- Date of birth: 19 December 1959
- Place of birth: Essen, West Germany
- Date of death: 26 January 2017 (aged 57)
- Height: 1.82 m (6 ft 0 in)
- Position: Striker

Senior career*
Years	Team	Apps	(Gls)
1978–1981	Schalke 04	7	(0)
1981–1982	SpVgg Bayreuth	24	(5)
1982–1985	FC Bocholt	64	(46)
1985–1987	Rot-Weiss Essen	45	(31)
1987–1992	MSV Duisburg	179	(101)
1992–1994	Wuppertaler SV	45	(17)
Total		364	(200)

International career
1977–1978	West Germany U-18	3	(5)
- * Club domestic league appearances and goals

Michael Tönnies (19 December 1959 – 26 January 2017) was a German professional footballer who played as a striker.

== Club career ==
Tönnies played in the (West) German top-flight for FC Schalke 04 and MSV Duisburg and scored in 40 matches 13 goals.

== Personal life and death ==
Tönnies was known as a chainsmoker and was diagnosed with lung damage in 2005 and had a lung transplant in April 2013. He died in January 2017, aged 57, of unknown causes.

== Honours ==
- Scorer of the second fastest hat-trick in Bundesliga history: six minutes (10th, 11th and 15th minute, 27 August 1991 in a 6–2 win against the Karlsruher SC, he scored five goals overall in that game). The performance was beaten by Robert Lewandowski on 22 September 2015.
- Second Fußball-Bundesliga 1990–91 top scorer: 29 goals.
