= Robert Matiebel =

German footballer

Personal information
- Date of birth: 25 November 1973 (age 52)
- Position: Midfielder

Senior career*
Years	Team	Apps	(Gls)
1994–1996	VfL Bochum	4	(0)
1996–1999	Hamburger SV II		
1999–2001	TuS Dassendorf		
2001–2006	ASV Bergedorf 85		
- * Club domestic league appearances and goals

Robert Matiebel (born 25 November 1973) is a German former professional footballer who played as a midfielder.
