= Andreas Wieczorek =

German footballer

Personal information
- Full name: Andreas Wieczorek
- Date of birth: 14 January 1974 (age 52)
- Position: Midfielder

Senior career*
Years	Team	Apps	(Gls)
1994–1996	VfL Bochum	4	(0)
1999–2000	VfB Lübeck		
2000–2001	Eintracht Braunschweig	25	(4)
2001–2002	SV Elversberg	5	(0)
- * Club domestic league appearances and goals

Andreas Wieczorek (born 14 January 1974) is a retired German football midfielder.
