= Uwe Stöver =

German footballer and coach (born 1967)

Personal information
- Date of birth: February 8, 1967 (age 59)
- Height: 1.87 m (6 ft 2 in)
- Position: Defender

Team information
- Current team: SV Wehen Wiesbaden (athletic director)

Senior career*
Years	Team	Apps	(Gls)
1992–1993	Bayer 04 Leverkusen	9	(1)
1993–1995	VfL Bochum	62	(4)
1995–1999	1. FSV Mainz 05	44	(1)

Managerial career
- 2001–2003: 1. FC Kaiserslautern II
- 2005: 1. FC Kaiserslautern II
- 2007–2009: SV Wehen Wiesbaden (athletic director)
- * Club domestic league appearances and goals

Uwe Stöver (born February 8, 1967) is a German former footballer who became a coach. He was athletic director for SV Wehen Wiesbaden until March 2009.

== Honours ==
- DFB-Pokal winner: 1993.
