= Oti (footballer) =

Spanish footballer

Personal information
- Full name: Antonio Manuel Rodríguez Cabo
- Date of birth: 19 October 1969 (age 57)
- Place of birth: Puerto de la Cruz, Spain
- Position: Midfielder

Senior career*
Years	Team	Apps	(Gls)
1986–1990	Puerto Cruz		
1990–1991	Realejos		
1991–1992	VfL Bochum II		
1991–1992	VfL Bochum	0	(0)
1992–1994	Realejos		
1994–1995	Granada	17	(2)
1995	Las Palmas	16	(2)
1995–1996	Granada	32	(14)
1996–1997	Málaga	34	(3)
1997–2000	Mensajero	105	(14)
2000–2001	Universidad	17	(0)
- * Club domestic league appearances and goals

Antonio Manuel Rodríguez Cabo (born 19 October 1969), also known as Oti, is a retired Spanish footballer.

== Career ==
Antonio Rodríguez Cabo played for Bundesliga side VfL Bochum in the 1991–92 season, but failed to make a single first team appearance. Almost a decade later he played for Universidad de Las Palmas in the Segunda División, appearing 17 times in the 2000–01 season.
