= Werner Altegoer =

- Born: 18 June 1935; Bochum
- Died: 9 January 2013 (aged 77); Dortmund
- Occupation: Coal Trading Company
- Known for: VfL Bochum president and chairman

Werner Altegoer (18 June 1935 – 9 January 2013) was a German entrepreneur; president and later chairman of the advisory board of football club VfL Bochum. He headed the club from 1993 until 2010, and was named honorary chairman of the supervisory board in 2011.

== Entrepreneurial career ==
Altegoer was born in Bochum in the Ruhrgebiet-area in western Germany. Until the age of 15 he played in the youth sides of local club VfL Bochum. However, at that point he decided to not continue his football career and to commence an apprenticeship in the Bochumer Kohlenkontor, a subsidiary of the coal mine Zeche Vereinigte Constantin der Große. Subsequent career steps were the Stinnes AG and from 1964 on coal trading company Paul Roskothen GmbH, which he converted from a regional enterprise into a firm group with an international business network.

== VfL Bochum ==
Altegoer maintained his interest for the VfL Bochum and visited regularly the home matches with family member as his parental house was also only at a few hundred meters distance from the Stadion an der Castroper Straße. His godfather – Willi Altegoer - introduced him to VfL Bochum's then president Ottokar Wüst. At the end of the 1970s Altegoer involved himself for the first time actively in the club and gave financial support to the transfer of goalgetter Jochen Abel from Westfalia Herne. In 1978, he officially became a member of the club.

Altegoer served twice as chair of the club's economic committee – from 1980 to 1982 and again from 1990 to 1993. 1993 he succeeded Ottokar Wüst and became the club's president, just after the club had been relegated to the Second Bundesliga. He continued to be the club's president until 30 October 2002, when the club took on a more modern, professional structure including a professional executive board. Werner Altegoer continued to act as chair of the board until 2010.

In Altegoer's 17 years at the top of the club VfL Bochum became a classic "yo-yo club", bouncing up and down between the first and second Bundesliga. Bochum relegated five times, but also managed to return five times directly to the highest levels. The club's best Bundesliga spells also felt in this time as 5th-place finishes in 1997 and 2004, which earned them appearances in the UEFA Cup tournament. In 1997, they advanced to the third round where they were put out by Dutch side Ajax Amsterdam, and in 2004, they were eliminated early through away goals (0–0 and 1–1) by Standard CL Liège of Belgium.

A priority of his presidency was the creation of modern club structures and infrastructures. The construction of the stadium center in 2003, situated next to the stadium, provided new space for changing rooms, a catering area and club offices. In economic terms Altegoer promoted a conservative policy for the financially traditionally rather troubled club and the VfL Bochum was able to eliminate almost all its debts until the relegation at the end of the 2009–10 season.

== Critique at other clubs ==
Altegoer was frequently cited in the German press as spokesperson of the smaller clubs in the league and criticised the unfair competition due to the financial engagement of multinationals in football clubs (Bayer 04 Leverkusen; VfL Wolfsburg) and the alleged double standards towards bigger clubs regarding the financial licensing systems. When the local rivals Borussia Dortmund and FC Schalke 04 had severe financial problems in 2005 he stated polemically „for me what's happening there is bankruptcy, or inability to pay; as they call it nowadays”. Another frequent point of critic was the distribution of television revenues and Altegoer claimed that an unfair distribution of television revenues would prevent a fair competition between bigger and smaller clubs in the Bundesliga.

== Criticism ==
In particular at the end of his VfL chairmanship increasingly grew criticism inside the club about his supposed patriarchal and autocratic governing style. Various fan groups created an initiative to call for profound reform. In a turbulent annual general meeting of the club, on 4 October 2010, the members refused to discharge the board. This legal instrument had been created for cases in which the members feared e.g. that the advisory board had misappropriated club money. However, in this case, this tool was used to vocalize the strife among the members with Altegoer. As a consequence he decided to resign from his post, but continued his work until the appointment of his successor Ernst-Otto Stüber in the subsequent general meeting.

Werner Altegoer election as honorary chair of the board was greeted with overwhelming applause from the members at the next annual general meeting of the club in 2011.

== Death ==
Altegoer died on 9 January 2013 after a long disease at the age of 77 in the Dortmunder Knappschaftskrankenhaus.

== Family ==
Altegoer was married for more than 50 years with his wife Ursula and had two children (Kerstin and Thomas) and grandchildren.

== Quotes about Werner Altegoer ==
- “It is not just me that says that there would not be a professional football club in Bochum today without Werner Altegoer – either in the first or the second Bundesliga.” („Nicht nur für mich steht es außerhalb jeder Frage, dass Bochum ohne den Einsatz Werner Altegoers heute keinen professionellen Fußballverein hätte – egal ob in der 1. oder 2. Liga“); Ernst-Otto Stüber, Werner Altegeoer's successor as club president on Werner Altegoer's 70th birthday in 2005.
