= Dirk Kontny =

German footballer

Personal information
- Date of birth: 30 November 1965 (age 60)
- Height: 1.80 m (5 ft 11 in)
- Position: Midfielder

Senior career*
Years	Team	Apps	(Gls)
1985–1991	SG Wattenscheid 09	161	(23)
1991	VfL Bochum	1	(0)
1991–1992	Fortuna Köln	6	(1)
Total		168	(24)
- * Club domestic league appearances and goals

Dirk Kontny (born 30 November 1965) is a German retired professional footballer who played as a midfielder.
