= Laußnitz =

- Municipality
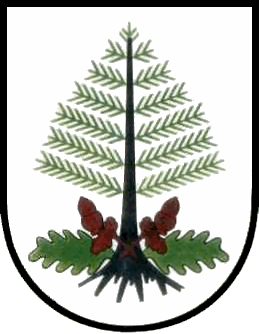
- Coat of arms

- Location of Laußnitz within Bautzen district
- Interactive map of Laußnitz
- Location within Germany Location within Saxony
- Coordinates: 51°14′50″N 13°52′45″E
- Country: Germany
- State: Saxony
- District: Bautzen
- Subdivisions: 3

Government
  - Mayor (2022–29): René Georgi

Area
  - Total: 63.74 km^{2} (24.61 sq mi)
- Elevation: 196 m (643 ft)

Population (2025-12-31)
  - Total: 1,792
  - Density: 28.11/km^{2} (72.82/sq mi)
- Time zone: UTC+01:00 (CET)
  - Summer (DST): UTC+02:00 (CEST)
- Postal codes: 01936
- Dialling codes: 035795
- Vehicle registration: BZ, BIW, HY, KM
- Website: www.laussnitz.de

Laußnitz (Sorbian: Łužnica, pronounced [ˈwuʒnʲitsa]) is a municipality in the district of Bautzen, in Saxony, Germany.
