= Bent Christensen Arensøe =

Danish footballer (born 1967)

Bent Christensen
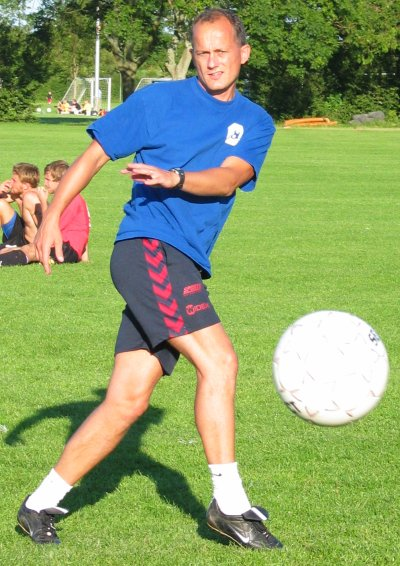
- Christensen managing Værløse BK in 2004

Personal information
- Full name: Bent Christensen Arensøe
- Date of birth: 4 January 1967 (age 59)
- Place of birth: Copenhagen, Denmark
- Height: 1.80 m (5 ft 11 in)
- Position: Striker

Team information
- Current team: Brøndby (assistant)

Senior career*
Years	Team	Apps	(Gls)
1984–1985	Brønshøj	18	(11)
1985–1986	Servette	11	(1)
1986–1987	→ Vejle Boldklub (loan)	29	(17)
1987–1991	Brøndby	100	(62)
1991–1993	Schalke 04	49	(8)
1993–1994	Olympiacos	26	(9)
1994–1997	Compostela	110	(35)
1997–1998	Gençlerbirliği	13	(3)
1998–2000	Brøndby	50	(20)
2000	Brønshøj	14	(8)
Total		420	(174)

International career
1983	Denmark u17	3	(1)
1983–1985	Denmark U19	25	(4)
1986–1987	Denmark U21	6	(2)
1989–1994	Denmark	26	(8)

Managerial career
- 2003–2005: Værløse
- 2013–2016: Denmark U19
Medal record
Men's football
Representing Denmark
UEFA European Championship
Winner	1992 Sweden
- * Club domestic league appearances and goals

Bent Christensen Arensøe, formerly known as Bent René Christensen, (born 4 January 1967) is a Danish former professional footballer who played as a striker.

During his active career he earned the nickname "Turbo" for his speed. He played in a string of clubs, most notably Danish club Brøndby, where he scored a combined 116 goals in 208 games and won five Danish championships. He played 26 games and scored eight goals for the Denmark national football team, and was a part of the Danish 1992 European Championship winning side.

== Playing career ==
=== Club career ===
Born in Copenhagen, Christensen started his career with Brønshøj in 1985, under manager Ebbe Skovdahl. He moved abroad in the same year, 17 years old, to play for Swiss club Servette. With Servette, he won the 1985 Swiss Super League. He wanted away from the club, and was initially loaned out to Danish club Vejle in 1987. He moved permanently to Brøndby, under manager Ebbe Skovdahl, later that year. He was a part of the team that won the 1988 and 1989 Danish championships.

In his time for Brøndby, he was Danish league top goalscorer three times, in the 1988 season, 1990 season and 1991 season tournaments. He was part of the Brøndby team who, under manager Morten Olsen, reached the semi-finals of the European 1991 UEFA Cup tournament, and he was sold to German team Schalke 04 later that year. The transfer deal was a race for Christensen's signature between Schalke and Eintracht Frankfurt, and was worth DEM 5 million, which made Christensen the most expensive Danish footballer at the time, with a monthly wage of DKK 400,000. He did not find playing success at Schalke, where he scored eight goals in 49 games, and he earned the nickname "Trabi-Bent".

He moved to Greek club Olympiacos for the 1993 season, where he found playing success. In July 1994, he moved on to Compostela in Spain. He remained three seasons at Compostela with good success, before moving to Gençlerbirliği in Turkey in 1997. Christensen returned to Brøndby in March 1998, under manager Ebbe Skovdahl, and was a part of Brøndby's 1998 Danish Superliga and 1998 Danish Cup wins. He also took part in Brøndby's campaign in the European 1998–99 UEFA Champions League tournament. After the 1999–00 season, he ended his professional career, and played his last games with childhood club Brønshøj in 2000.

=== International career ===
Christensen made his international debut with the Denmark under-19 national team in July 1983. He scored a combined five goals in 28 games for the under-19 and under-17 teams until June 1985, scoring one goal at the 1984 UEFA European Under-19 Football Championship. He made his Danish under-21 debut in October 1986, and scored two goals in six games for the team until September 1987.

He made his senior debut for the Danish national team in the February 1989 friendly match against Malta. He scored six goals in four games in Denmark's UEFA Euro 1992 qualifying campaign. He was selected to represent the Danish national team at the UEFA Euro 1992 in Sweden. Christensen played Denmark's first two games in the tournament without scoring, but was injured and travelled home while the rest of the squad went on to win the tournament. Christensen didn't take part in the Danish public celebrations of the trophy, and did not really feel a part of the winning team. While at Compostela, Christensen played his last national team match in November 1994, against Spain, and ended his national team career after 26 matches and 8 goals.

== International goals ==
No.	Date	Venue	Opponent	Score	Result	Competition
1.	5 September 1990	Västerås, Sweden	Sweden	1–0	1–0	Friendly
2.	1 May 1991	Belgrade, Yugoslavia	Yugoslavia	1–0	2–1	UEFA Euro 1992 qualifying
3.	1 May 1991	Belgrade, Yugoslavia	Yugoslavia	2–1	2–1	UEFA Euro 1992 qualifying
4.	5 June 1991	Odense, Denmark	Austria	1–0	2–1	UEFA Euro 1992 qualifying
5.	5 June 1991	Odense, Denmark	Austria	2–0	2–1	UEFA Euro 1992 qualifying
6.	25 September 1991	Landskrona, Sweden	Faroe Islands	2–0	4–0	UEFA Euro 1992 qualifying
7.	9 October 1991	Vienna, Austria	Austria	3–0	3–0	UEFA Euro 1992 qualifying
8.	3 June 1992	Copenhagen, Denmark	CIS	1–0	1–1	Friendly

== Coaching career ==
In January 2003, he started as head coach of Værløse, which he led to the Danish 2nd Division. In October 2005, he was hired as head coach of the Brøndby youth team, and in June 2010, he was additionally named coach in charge of special training of attackers for the first team. In 2011, Christensen was named as assistant coach in Brøndby.

When Thomas Frank was named new manager of Brøndby in June 2013, Christensen succeeded him as manager of the Danish national under-19 football team.

In February 2016, Christensen returned to Brøndby IF, where he was hired as A+ coach at the club's academy. He later became transition coach at the club before being promoted to assistant coach of the club's first team in early January 2025, under the newly appointed manager, Frederik Birk.

== Career highlights ==
=== Club statistics ===
Total number of goals for Brøndby (1987–1991 and 1998–2000):

- Danish Superliga: 80 goals
- Danish Cup: 16 goals
- UEFA Intertoto Cup: 10 goals
- UEFA Cup/European Cup: 10 goals
- Total score in 208 games: 116 goals

=== Honours ===
- Swiss Super League: 1984–85
- Danish Championship: 1987, 1988, 1990, 1991, 1997–98
- Danish Cup: 1988–89, 1997–98
- European Football Championship: 1992
