= Peter Zanter =

German footballer (born 1965)

Personal information
- Date of birth: 11 November 1965 (age 60)
- Position: Defender

Youth career
- Bayer Leverkusen

Senior career*
Years	Team	Apps	(Gls)
1985–1988	Bayer Leverkusen	40	(0)
1988–1989	Hannover 96	21	(0)
1989–1993	VfL Bochum	29	(0)
Total		90	(0)

International career
1986–1987	West Germany U21	4	(0)

Managerial career
- –2000: KFC Uerdingen 05 (assistant)
- 2000–2001: Fortuna Köln (assistant)
- 2001–2002: Eintracht Braunschweig (assistant)
- 2002–2003: Preußen Münster (assistant)
- 2008: Holstein Kiel (assistant)
- * Club domestic league appearances and goals

Peter Zanter (born 11 November 1965) is a German football coach and former player who played as a defender As a player, he spent eight seasons in the Bundesliga with Bayer Leverkusen, Hannover 96, and VfL Bochum, but had to give up his playing career early because of an injury.

== Honours ==
Bayer Leverkusen

- UEFA Cup: 1987–88
