= Thorsten Schmugge =

German footballer (born 1971)

Personal information
- Date of birth: 13 October 1971 (age 55)
- Place of birth: Garmisch-Partenkirchen, West Germany
- Height: 1.74 m (5 ft 9 in)
- Positions: Forward; midfielder

Youth career
- 1979–1990: VfL Bochum

Senior career*
Years	Team	Apps	(Gls)
1990–1992	VfL Bochum II		
1991–1992	VfL Bochum	0	(0)
1992–1994	Wuppertaler SV	70	(3)
1994–1995	1. FC Saarbrücken	32	(2)
1995–1996	VfL Bochum	8	(0)
1996	Hibernian	1	(0)
1996–1997	DJK TuS Hordel		
1997–2000	SG Wattenscheid 09	71	(5)
2000–2002	KFC Uerdingen 05	61	(8)
2002–2003	SV Wilhelmshaven	38	(0)
2004	Kickers Emden	15	(2)
2004–2005	SpVgg Germania Ratingen		
2005–2009	VfB Speldorf		

International career
- Germany U21
- Germany beachsoccer national team
- Germany indoor national team
- * Club domestic league appearances and goals

Thorsten Schmugge (born 13 October 1971) is a German former professional footballer who played as a forward.

== Career ==
Schmugge made one appearance for Scottish club Hibernian, in a 2–0 win against Aberdeen on 21 September 1996. Schmugge, who signed for Hibs on the same day as Ray Wilkins, represented the Germany national under-21 football team.

== Career statistics ==
Appearances and goals by club, season and competition
Club	Season	League			Cup		Total	
Club	Season	Division	Apps	Goals	Apps	Goals	Apps	Goals
VfL Bochum II	1990–91	Oberliga Westfalen			—			
VfL Bochum II	1991–92	Oberliga Westfalen			—			
VfL Bochum II	Total				0	0		
VfL Bochum	1991–92	Bundesliga	0	0	0	0	0	0
Wuppertaler SV	1992–93	2. Bundesliga	38	1	1	1	39	2
Wuppertaler SV	1993–94	2. Bundesliga	32	2	1	0	33	2
Wuppertaler SV	Total		70	3	2	1	72	4
1. FC Saarbrücken	1994–95	2. Bundesliga	32	2	3	1	35	3
VfL Bochum	1995–96	2. Bundesliga	8	0	0	0	8	0
Hibernian	1996–97	Premier Division	1	0	0	0	1	0
DJK TuS Hordel	1996–97	Oberliga Westfalen			—			
DJK TuS Hordel	1997–98	Oberliga Westfalen			—			
DJK TuS Hordel	Total				0	0		
SG Wattenscheid 09	1997–98	2. Bundesliga	16	2	0	0	16	2
SG Wattenscheid 09	1998–99	2. Bundesliga	21	0	1	0	22	0
SG Wattenscheid 09	1999–00	Regionalliga West/Südwest	34	3	1	0	35	3
SG Wattenscheid 09	Total		71	5	2	0	73	5
KFC Uerdingen 05	2000–01	Regionalliga Nord	31	3	—		31	3
KFC Uerdingen 05	2001–02	Regionalliga Nord	30	5	3	3	33	8
KFC Uerdingen 05	Total		61	8	3	3	64	11
SV Wilhelmshaven	2002–03	Oberliga Niedersachsen/Bremen	34	0	—		34	0
SV Wilhelmshaven	2003–04	Oberliga Niedersachsen/Bremen	4	0	—		4	0
SV Wilhelmshaven	Total	Oberliga Niedersachsen/Bremen	38	0	0	0	38	0
Kickers Emden	2003–04	15	2	—		15	2	
SpVgg Germania Ratingen	2004–05	Verbandsliga Niederrhein			—			
VfB Speldorf	2005–06	Oberliga Nordrhein	26	0	—		26	0
VfB Speldorf	2006–07	Oberliga Nordrhein	26	0	—		26	0
VfB Speldorf	2007–08	Oberliga Nordrhein	34	1	—		34	1
VfB Speldorf	2008–09	Verbandsliga Niederrhein			—			
VfB Speldorf	Total				0	0		
Career total					10	5		
