= Frank Türr =

German footballer

Personal information
- Full name: Frank Türr
- Date of birth: 16 September 1970 (age 56)
- Place of birth: Nuremberg, West Germany
- Height: 1.73 m (5 ft 8 in)
- Position: Forward

Senior career*
Years	Team	Apps	(Gls)
1988–1991	1. FC Nürnberg	54	(9)
1991–1992	VfL Bochum	22	(2)
1993	Eintracht Braunschweig	20	(1)
1993–1994	SpVgg Bayreuth	30	(9)
1994–2002	Greuther Fürth	228	(86)
Total		354	(107)

International career
	West Germany Olympic	2	(0)
- * Club domestic league appearances and goals

Frank Türr (born 16 September 1970) is a German former professional footballer who played as a forward.
