= Holger Aden =

German footballer (born 1965)

Personal information
- Full name: Holger Aden
- Date of birth: 25 August 1965 (age 61)
- Place of birth: Hamburg, West Germany
- Height: 1.80 m (5 ft 11 in)
- Position: Forward

Senior career*
Years	Team	Apps	(Gls)
1985–1987	SC Concordia	52	(17)
1987–1988	Altonaer FC	32	(15)
1988–1989	1. SC Norderstedt	34	(22)
1989	Bayer Leverkusen	2	(0)
1990–1992	Eintracht Braunschweig	98	(52)
1992–1996	VfL Bochum	42	(20)
Total		260	(126)
- * Club domestic league appearances and goals

Holger Aden (born 25 August 1965) is a German retired professional footballer who played as a forward.

== Career statistics ==
Appearances and goals by club, season and competition
Club	Season	League			DFB-Pokal		Total	
Club	Season	Division	Apps	Goals	Apps	Goals	Apps	Goals
SC Concordia	1985–86	Oberliga Nord	27	8	—		27	8
SC Concordia	1986–87	Oberliga Nord	25	9	—		25	9
SC Concordia	Total		52	17	0	0	52	17
Altonaer FC	1987–88	Oberliga Nord	32	15	—		32	15
1. SC Norderstedt	1988–89	Oberliga Nord	34	22	—		34	22
Bayer Leverkusen	1989–90	Bundesliga	2	0	1	0	3	0
Eintracht Braunschweig	1989–90	2. Bundesliga	14	6	0	0	14	6
Eintracht Braunschweig	1990–91	2. Bundesliga	35	14	2	0	37	14
Eintracht Braunschweig	1991–92	2. Bundesliga	27	13	1	1	28	14
Eintracht Braunschweig	1992–93	2. Bundesliga	22	19	2	3	24	22
Eintracht Braunschweig	Total		98	52	5	4	103	56
VfL Bochum	1992–93	Bundesliga	18	9	0	0	18	9
VfL Bochum	1993–94	2. Bundesliga	20	7	1	0	21	7
VfL Bochum	1994–95	Bundesliga	4	4	2	0	6	4
VfL Bochum	1995–96	2. Bundesliga	0	0	0	0	0	0
VfL Bochum	Total		42	20	3	0	45	20
Career total			260	126	9	4	269	130
