= Sven Christians =

German footballer

Personal information
- Full name: Sven Christians
- Date of birth: 28 January 1967 (age 59)
- Height: 1.80 m (5 ft 11 in)
- Position: Defender

Senior career*
Years	Team	Apps	(Gls)
–1989	Vorwärts Frankfurt/Oder		
1989–1990	FSV Velten		
1991	Borussia Neunkirchen		
1991–1992	Wuppertaler SV		
1992–1995	VfL Bochum	72	(5)
1995–1997	Wuppertaler SV		
1997–1998	SV Babelsberg 03		
- * Club domestic league appearances and goals

Sven Christians (born 28 January 1967) is a retired German football defender.
