= Michael Hubner =

German footballer

Personal information
- Full name: Michael Hubner
- Date of birth: 12 August 1969 (age 57)
- Place of birth: West Germany
- Height: 1.88 m (6 ft 2 in)
- Position: Midfielder

Senior career*
Years	Team	Apps	(Gls)
1987–1990	VfL Bochum II		
1987–1991	VfL Bochum	32	(2)
1991	→ Rot-Weiss Essen (loan)	15	(4)
1991–1993	FC Homburg	59	(24)
1993–1995	VfL Bochum	32	(2)
1995–1998	SpVgg Erkenschwick		
1998	LR Ahlen	16	(3)
1999–2000	Rot-Weiss Essen	11	(4)

International career
	Germany U-15	4	(0)
	Germany U-16	9	(6)
	Germany U-17	5	(3)
	Germany U-18	8	(3)
1990	Germany U-21	3	(1)
- * Club domestic league appearances and goals

Michael Hubner (born 12 August 1969) is a retired German footballer.
