= Thomas Epp =

German footballer

Personal information
- Date of birth: 7 April 1968 (age 58)
- Place of birth: Bietigheim-Bissingen, West Germany
- Height: 1.76 m (5 ft 9 in)
- Position: Forward

Senior career*
Years	Team	Apps	(Gls)
1987–1989	VfL Bochum	46	(4)
1989–1990	1. FC Saarbrücken	15	(4)
1990–1992	VfL Bochum	22	(3)
1992–1993	Stuttgarter Kickers	33	(14)
1993–1997	Waldhof Mannheim	67	(12)
1997–1999	Eintracht Frankfurt	41	(5)
1999–2000	Admira Wacker Mödling	5	(4)
2000–2001	AEL Limassol	6	(1)
Total		235	(47)

International career
1988	West Germany U-21	1	(1)
- * Club domestic league appearances and goals

Thomas Epp (born 7 April 1968 in Bietigheim-Bissingen, Baden-Württemberg) is a German former professional footballer who played as a forward.
