= Patrick Guillou =

German footballer (born 1970)

Personal information
- Full name: Patrick Guillou
- Date of birth: 16 April 1970 (age 56)
- Place of birth: Villingen, West Germany
- Height: 1.70 m (5 ft 7 in)
- Position: Defender

Youth career
- –1988: Freiburger FC

Senior career*
Years	Team	Apps	(Gls)
1988–1990	Freiburger FC	64	(3)
1990–1993	VfL Bochum II		
1990–1993	VfL Bochum	9	(0)
1993–1994	Rennes	30	(1)
1994–1996	Châteauroux	61	(0)
1996–1997	Red Star	17	(0)
1997–2000	Saint-Étienne	61	(0)
2000–2001	Sochaux	27	(1)
2001–2003	Saint-Étienne	38	(0)
2004–2005	Rouen	4	(0)
- * Club domestic league appearances and goals

Patrick Guillou (16 April 1970) is a German former professional footballer who played as a defender.

Guillou had trial spells with Walsall and Hibernian in 1999.
