= Olaf Dreßel =

German footballer

Personal information
- Full name: Olaf Dreßel
- Date of birth: 19 September 1968 (age 58)
- Place of birth: Bochum, West Germany
- Height: 1.80 m (5 ft 11 in)
- Position: Defender

Youth career
- –1987: VfL Bochum

Senior career*
Years	Team	Apps	(Gls)
1986–1990	VfL Bochum II		
1987–1994	VfL Bochum	95	(3)
1996–1997	SpVgg Erkenschwick	12	(0)
1997–	Borussia Wuppertal		
- * Club domestic league appearances and goals

Olaf Dreßel (born 19 September 1968) is a retired German football defender who played centre-back.
