= Andreas Wessels =

German footballer

Personal information
- Full name: Andreas Wessels
- Date of birth: July 6, 1964 (age 62)
- Place of birth: Uedem, West Germany
- Position: Goalkeeper

Youth career
- SV Uedem
- –1982: SC Kleve

Senior career*
Years	Team	Apps	(Gls)
1982–1986	SV Viktoria Goch		
1986–1995	VfL Bochum	158	(0)
1995–1999	SC Fortuna Köln	80	(0)
- * Club domestic league appearances and goals

Andreas Wessels (born July 6, 1964) is a retired German football goalkeeper.
