= Frank Heinemann =

German footballer (born 1965)

Personal information
- Date of birth: 8 January 1965 (age 61)
- Place of birth: Bochum, West Germany
- Height: 1.77 m (5 ft 10 in)
- Position: Midfielder

Team information
- Current team: KFC Uerdingen (assistant)

Youth career
- SV Vöde
- –1976: DJK Hiltrop-Bergen
- 1976–1983: VfL Bochum

Senior career*
Years	Team	Apps	(Gls)
1983–1986	VfL Bochum II		
1986–1996	VfL Bochum	216	(15)

Managerial career
- 1996–2009: VfL Bochum (assistant)
- 2009: VfL Bochum (caretaker)
- 2011–2013: Hamburger SV (assistant)
- 2013–2015: VfL Bochum (assistant)
- 2014: VfL Bochum (caretaker)
- 2016: Darmstadt 98 (assistant)
- 2017: 1. FC Kaiserslautern
- 2019–: KFC Uerdingen (assistant)
- 2019: KFC Uerdingen (caretaker)
- * Club domestic league appearances and goals

Frank 'Funny' Heinemann (born 8 January 1965) is a German football coach and former player who is assistant manager of Bundesliga club VfL Bochum.

== Coaching career ==
From 1996 until 2009, Heinemann was the assistant manager of VfL Bochum. He was appointed caretaker manager of Bochum's Bundesliga team on 21 September 2009 until a new manager was appointed on 27 October. Between 1 March 2010 and 14 March 2011, Heinemann was youth coordinator of VfL Bochum.

On 16 March 2019, he briefly took over KFC Uerdingen as caretaker manager.
