= Dimitrios Moutas =

German-born Greek footballer

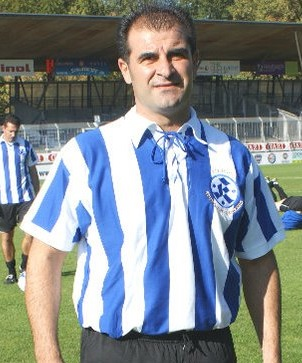
- Moutas in 2013

Personal information
- Date of birth: 15 April 1968 (age 58)
- Place of birth: Stuttgart, West Germany
- Height: 1.76 m (5 ft 9 in)
- Position: Forward

Youth career
- TV Kemnat
- SV Hoffeld
- –1986: Stuttgarter Kickers

Senior career*
Years	Team	Apps	(Gls)
1986–1988	1. FC Pforzheim	58	(20)
1988–1990	SC Freiburg	66	(20)
1990–1992	Stuttgarter Kickers	66	(25)
1992–1993	VfL Bochum	15	(3)
1993–1994	Stuttgarter Kickers	32	(7)
1994–1997	OFI	68	(8)
1997–1998	Athinaikos	13	(1)
1998	Kavala	6	(1)
1999–2000	Panelefsiniakos	15	(1)
2000–2001	Ethnikos Piraeus		
2002–2003	Fostiras	2	(1)
2003	Ethnikos Asteras	17	(4)

Managerial career
- 2001: Ethnikos Piraeus (caretaker)
- 2006: Niki Volos
- 2007–2008: Acharnaikos
- 2008–2009: Kallithea
- 2012: Platanias (assistant)
- 2013: Iraklis (assistant)
- 2015–2016: Sandhausen (assistant)
- 2017–2020: Karlsruhe (assistant)
- * Club domestic league appearances and goals

Dimitrios Moutas (Greek: Δημήτριος Μούτας; born 15 April 1968) is a Greek former professional footballer who is assistant head coach of Hansa Rostock who played as a forward.
