= Rob Reekers =

Dutch footballer (born 1966)

Personal information
- Date of birth: 7 May 1966 (age 60)
- Place of birth: Enschede, Overijssel, Netherlands
- Position: Defender

Youth career
- 1974–1981: KVV Losser

Senior career*
Years	Team	Apps	(Gls)
1981–1982	KVV Losser		
1982–1985	FC Twente II		
1985–1986	ASC Schöppingen		
1986–1995	VfL Bochum	242	(8)
1995–2000	FC Gütersloh	90	(0)

International career
1988–1989	Netherlands	4	(0)

Managerial career
- 2000–2003: Rot-Weiß Oberhausen
- 2003–2004: FC Gütersloh
- 2006–2008: SuS Stadtlohn
- 2008–2009: Neftchi Baku PFC (assistant)
- 2009–2012: FC Augsburg (assistant)
- 2012–: Hertha BSC (assistant)
- * Club domestic league appearances and goals

Robert Reekers (born 7 May 1966) is a Dutch retired footballer who played in the Netherlands for FC Twente and in Germany for ASC Schöppingen, VfL Bochum and FC Gütersloh. He earned four caps for the Netherlands national side between 1988 and 1989. After retiring as a player in 2000, Reekers has managed Rot-Weiß Oberhausen, FC Gütersloh and SuS Stadtlohn.

Reekers worked by the end of June 2009 to June 2012 as Assistant coach of Jos Luhukay at FC Augsburg. For the 2012–13 season, he moved with him to Hertha BSC.

Reekers is one of a small number of Dutch footballers to be selected for the Netherlands national team while never having played in the Dutch Eredivisie. The other capped players are Jordi Cruyff, Jerrel Hasselbaink, Willi Lippens, Wim Hofkens, Nathan Aké, Timothy Fosu-Mensah and Javairô Dilrosun.

== Honours ==
- Oberliga Westfalen: champion 1985–86
- DFB-Pokal: runner-up 1987–88
- 2. Bundesliga: champion 1993–94
- Regionalliga West/Südwest: champion 1995–96
