= Michael Rzehaczek =

German footballer

Personal information
- Full name: Michael Rzehaczek
- Date of birth: 17 January 1967 (age 59)
- Place of birth: Recklinghausen, West Germany
- Height: 1.70 m (5 ft 7 in)
- Position: Midfielder

Youth career
- –1985: 1. FC Recklinghausen

Senior career*
Years	Team	Apps	(Gls)
1985–1987	1. FC Recklinghausen		
1987–1988	VfL Bochum II		
1987–1993	VfL Bochum	139	(16)
Medal record
VfL Bochum
Runner-up	DFB-Pokal	1987–88
- * Club domestic league appearances and goals

Michael Rzehaczek (born 17 January 1967) is a retired German football midfielder. He was forced to retire due to knee injuries.

== Career ==
=== Statistics ===
Club performance			League		Cup		Total	
Season	Club	League	Apps	Goals	Apps	Goals	Apps	Goals
West Germany			League		DFB-Pokal		Total	
1985–86	1. FC Recklinghausen	Oberliga Westfalen			—			
1986–87	1. FC Recklinghausen	Oberliga Westfalen			—			
1987–88	VfL Bochum II	Oberliga Westfalen			—			
1987–88	VfL Bochum	Bundesliga	15	2	3	0	18	2
1988–89	VfL Bochum	Bundesliga	27	0	2	0	29	0
1989–90	VfL Bochum	Bundesliga	32	8	2	0	34	8
1990–91	VfL Bochum	Bundesliga	29	5	1	0	30	5
Germany			League		DFB-Pokal		Total	
1991–92	VfL Bochum	Bundesliga	28	1	1	0	29	1
1992–93	VfL Bochum	Bundesliga	8	0	1	0	9	0
Total	West Germany				8	0		
Total	Germany		36	1	2	0	38	1
Career total					10	0		
