= Jörg Schwanke =

German footballer (born 1969)

Personal information
- Full name: Jörg Schwanke
- Date of birth: 12 January 1969 (age 57)
- Place of birth: Peitz, Bezirk Cottbus, East Germany
- Height: 1.76 m (5 ft 9 in)
- Position: Midfielder

Team information
- Current team: Hertha BSC II (Manager)

Youth career
- –1981: FC Energie Cottbus
- 1981–1986: BFC Dynamo
- 1986–1987: FC Energie Cottbus

Senior career*
Years	Team	Apps	(Gls)
1987–1991	FC Energie Cottbus	64	(2)
1991–1995	VfL Bochum	84	(2)
1995–1996	1. FC Union Berlin	31	(0)
1996–1997	LR Ahlen	29	(0)
1997–1998	SV Babelsberg 03	11	(0)
1998–2000	1. FC Union Berlin	59	(2)
2000–2002	LR Ahlen	17	(0)
2002	SC Paderborn 07	2	(0)
2002–2003	Dresdner SC	15	(2)
2003–2004	BFC Dynamo	22	(4)
2004–2005	SV Babelsberg 03	32	(4)
2005–2006	1. FC Union Berlin	10	(0)
2007	SV Germania Schöneiche	11	(0)
2007–2008	RSV Waltersdorf	12	(?)
Total		389	(16)

International career
1990	East Germany	1	(0)

Managerial career
- 2013–: Hertha BSC II
- * Club domestic league appearances and goals

Jörg Schwanke (born 12 January 1969 in Peitz) is a retired German football player who is now coach of Hertha BSC II.

Schwanke made 59 appearances for VfL Bochum in the Bundesliga during his playing career. Before the German reunification the midfielder played in the last East German international.
