= Dirk Eitzert =

German footballer

Personal information
- Full name: Dirk Eitzert
- Date of birth: 1 November 1968 (age 57)
- Place of birth: Dortmund, West Germany
- Height: 1.77 m (5 ft 9 1/2 in)
- Position: Midfielder

Youth career
- 1977–1987: BV Westfalia Wickede

Senior career*
Years	Team	Apps	(Gls)
1987–1988	BV Westfalia Wickede		
1988–1989	SF Oestrich-Iserlohn		
1989–1992	VfL Bochum II		
1989–1995	VfL Bochum	47	(0)
- * Club domestic league appearances and goals

Dirk Eitzert (born 1 November 1968) is a retired German football midfielder.
