= Christian Herrmann =

German footballer

Personal information
- Date of birth: 16 January 1966 (age 60)
- Place of birth: West Berlin, West Germany
- Height: 1.88 m (6 ft 2 in)
- Position: Defender

Senior career*
Years	Team	Apps	(Gls)
1986–1987	BFC Preussen		
1987–1988	FC Schalke 04	1	(0)
1988–1990	FC 08 Homburg	64	(3)
1990–1997	VfL Bochum	150	(6)
- * Club domestic league appearances and goals

Christian Herrmann (born 16 January 1966) is a retired German football player.
