= Hermann Albrecht =

German football referee (born 1961)

- Born: 1 September 1961 (age 65)

Domestic
Years	League	Role
1989–2005	Bundesliga	Referee
1989–2005	2. Bundesliga	Referee

International
Years	League	Role
1994–2005	UEFA	Referee

Hermann Albrecht (born 1 September 1961) is a German former football referee.

== Sporting career ==
Albrecht became an international referee in 1993. During his career he arbitrated in the Bundesliga, 2. Bundesliga, DFB-Pokal, UEFA Europa League, UEFA Cup Winners' Cup, and qualifications of the UEFA Champions League and the UEFA European Championship.

He officiated a total of 192 Bundesliga games and 88 games in the 2. Bundesliga.

He arbitrated seven UEFA Cup matches, the first in 1995–96 between AC Omonia and S.S. Lazio on 26 September 1995.

He also arbitrated five UEFA Cup Winners' Cup Games, the first in 1994–1995 between FC Chornomorets Odesa and Grasshopper Club Zürich on 29 September 1994.

He debuted in the Bundesliga on 16 August 1989, in the 1. FC Köln vs. 1. FC Kaiserslautern match.

He concluded his career in 2005. He currently works in Kaufbeuren.
