= Michael Klauß (footballer, born 1970) =

German footballer

Personal information
- Date of birth: 15 September 1970 (age 56)
- Place of birth: West Germany
- Position: Forward

Senior career*
Years	Team	Apps	(Gls)
1988–1991	FC Bayer 05 Uerdingen	28	(2)
1991	VfL Bochum	3	(0)
1991–1992	FC St. Pauli	8	(0)
1992–1993	VfL Bochum	10	(1)
1993–1994	Rot-Weiß Oberhausen		
1994–1996	Wuppertaler SV		
1996–1998	Darmstadt 98		

International career
1990	Germany U-21	3	(3)
- * Club domestic league appearances and goals

Michael Klauß (born 15 September 1970) is a German former professional footballer who played as a forward.
