= Dirk Helmig =

German footballer and manager

Personal information
- Full name: Dirk Helmig
- Date of birth: 3 May 1965 (age 61)
- Height: 1.75 m (5 ft 9 in)
- Position: Midfielder

Team information
- Current team: Schwarz-Weiß Essen (manager)

Senior career*
Years	Team	Apps	(Gls)
1983–1990	Rot-Weiss Essen	136	(37)
1990–1994	VfL Bochum	59	(6)
1994–1999	Rot-Weiss Essen		
1999–2000	1. FC Bocholt	30	(13)

Managerial career
- 2000: 1. FC Bocholt
- 2007–2009: SG Wattenscheid 09
- 2009–: Schwarz-Weiß Essen
- * Club domestic league appearances and goals

Dirk Helmig (born 3 May 1965) is a German football manager and former midfielder.
