= Marcus Marin =

German footballer (born 1966)

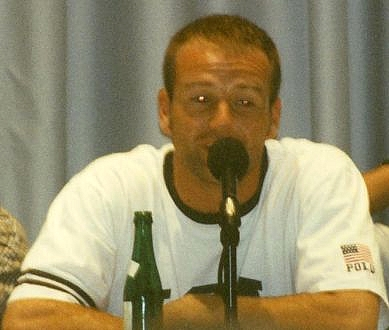
- Marin in 1997

Personal information
- Date of birth: 13 December 1966 (age 59)
- Place of birth: Hamburg, West Germany
- Height: 1.83 m (6 ft 0 in)
- Position: Striker

Youth career
- TSV Glinde
- VfL Lohbrügge
- TSV Reinbek

Senior career*
Years	Team	Apps	(Gls)
1985–1986	Hummelsbütteler SV		
1986–1988	Hamburger SV II		
1988–1990	Hamburger SV	15	(0)
1990–1992	Stuttgarter Kickers	69	(35)
1992–1993	1. FC Kaiserslautern	40	(9)
1994	→ FC St. Pauli (loan)	17	(10)
1995	FC Sion		
1995–1997	MSV Duisburg	60	(24)
1997–2000	FC St. Pauli	85	(30)
2000–2001	Fortuna Düsseldorf	33	(8)
2001–2002	Holstein Kiel	24	(1)
2002–2003	TuS Dassendorf		

Managerial career
- 2003–2004: TuS Dassendorf
- * Club domestic league appearances and goals

Marcus Marin (born 13 December 1966) is a German football coach and former player who works as player agent.

== Career ==
Marin was born in Hamburg. He played 118 games and scored 33 goals in the Bundesliga.

== Honours ==
- Bundesliga runner-up: 1993–94
