= 1993–94 Tennis Borussia Berlin season =

Tennis Borussia Berlin
1993–94 season
- Manager: Willibert Kremer (until 12 October 1993); Bernd Patzke (13–18 October 1993); Wolfgang Sidka (19 October 1993 – 3 May 1994); Uwe Jahn (from 4 May 1994)
- Stadium: Mommsenstadion
- 2. Bundesliga: 19th (relegated)
- DFB-Pokal: Semi-finals
- Top goalscorer: League: Mikhail Rusyayev (11); All: Mikhail Rusyayev (13)
- Highest home attendance: 6,800 (vs. Hertha BSC)
- Lowest home attendance: 800 (vs. F.C. Hansa Rostock)
- Average home league attendance: 2,034

The 1993–94 season was the seventh time Tennis Borussia Berlin played in the 2. Fußball-Bundesliga, the second highest tier of the German football league system. After 38 league games, Tennis Borussia finished 19th and were relegated. The club had a long run in the DFB-Pokal; making it to the semi-finals where they lost 2–0 away to Rot-Weiss Essen. Mikhail Rusyayev scored 11 of the club's 42 league goals.

== 1993–94 Tennis Borussia Berlin squad ==
No.	Pos.	Nation	Player
—	GK	GER	Gerald Hillringhaus
—	GK	GER	Martin Pieckenhagen
—	DF	TUR	Taşkın Aksoy
—	DF	BIH	Almedin Civa
—	DF	GER	Egon Flad
—	DF	GER	Olaf Kapagiannidis
—	DF	GER	Andreas Keim
—	DF	GER	Jörn Lenz
—	DF	GER	Dirk Muschiol
—	DF	TUR	Tekin Sazlog
—	DF	GER	Michael Schröder
—	DF	GER	Klaus Theiss
—	MF	GER	Olaf Backasch
—	MF	DEN	Bjarne Goldbæk (from 1 October 1993)

No.	Pos.	Nation	Player
—	MF	USA	Brent Goulet
—	MF	HUN	Gyula Hajszán
—	MF	GER	Antoine Hey (from 1 October 1993)
—	MF	CRO	Davor Krznarić
—	MF	CZE	Stanislav Levý
—	MF	NOR	Arne Sandstø
—	MF	GER	René Tretschok
—	MF	GER	Jan Wehrmann
—	FW	GER	Thorsten Boer
—	FW	GER	Jens Henschel (until 31 December 1993)
—	FW	POL	Andrzej Kobylański (from 1 November 1993)
—	FW	RUS	Mikhail Rusyayev
—	FW	GER	René Unglaube
—	FW	GER	Thomas Vogel

== 1993–94 fixtures ==
27 July 1993 2. Bundesliga	Tennis Borussia Berlin	0 – 1	1. FSV Mainz 05	Mommsenstadion, Berlin
19:00	Pieckenhagen (yellow card) Lenz (yellow card) Flad (yellow card)	Report	Müller 27'; Schäfer (yellow card) Wagner (yellow card); Sarpong (red card) 90'	Attendance: 4,872; Referee: Bernd Heynemann (Magdeburg)

31 July 1993 2. Bundesliga	Hannover 96	0 – 1	Tennis Borussia Berlin	Eilenriedestadion, Hanover
15:30	Winkler (yellow card) Ellermann (yellow card)	Report	Schröder 50'; Hillringhaus (yellow card) Schröder (yellow card) Henschel (yellow card) Sandstø (yellow card) Muschiol (yellow card) 51' (yellow-red card)	Attendance: 11,000; Referee: Jörg Hotop (Cologne)

6 August 1993 2. Bundesliga	Tennis Borussia Berlin	0 – 4	1. FC Saarbrücken	Mommsenstadion, Berlin
19:00	Schröder (yellow card); Backasch (red card) 88'	Report	Savichev 59'; Wynalda 65', 75'; Knäbel 90'; Bürger (yellow card)	Attendance: 3,065; Referee: Jürgen Aust (Cologne)

13 August 1993 2. Bundesliga	TSV 1860 München	2 – 1	Tennis Borussia Berlin	Grünwalder Stadion, Munich
20:00	Pacult 45'; Winkler 73'; Miller (yellow card)	Report	Rusyayev 26'; Schröder (yellow card) Backasch (yellow card) Rusyayev (yellow card)	Attendance: 26,000; Referee: Thomas Leimert (Ludwigshafen)

21 August 1993 2. Bundesliga	Tennis Borussia Berlin	1 – 1	VfL Bochum	Mommsenstadion, Berlin
15:30	Vogel 84'; Lenz (yellow card) Aksoy (yellow card) Vogel (yellow card) Rusyayev (yellow card)	Report	Kim 48'; Christians (yellow card) da Palma (yellow card) Wegmann (yellow card)	Attendance: 3,800; Referee: Helmut Fleischer (Ulm)

24 August 1993 DFB-Pokal – R2	ASV Neumarkt	0 – 4	Tennis Borussia Berlin	ASV Sportzentrum, Neumarkt in der Oberpfalz
	Herzog (yellow card)	Report	Rusyayev 22', 53'; Vogel 69'; Goulet 90'; Keim (yellow card) Aksoy (red card) 36'	Attendance: 1,200; Referee: Müller (Gera)

27 August 1993 2. Bundesliga	Wuppertaler SV	1 – 0	Tennis Borussia Berlin	Stadion am Zoo, Wuppertal
19:30	Kindgen 18'; Ksienzyk (yellow card) Naawu (yellow card)	Report	Schröder (yellow card) Vogel (yellow card)	Attendance: 5,000; Referee: Ratzek

2 September 1993 2. Bundesliga	Tennis Borussia Berlin	0 – 0	FC St. Pauli	Mommsenstadion, Berlin
20:00	Lenz (yellow card) Vogel (yellow card)	Report	Schlindwein (yellow card) Fröhling (yellow card) Driller (yellow card)	Attendance: 2,700; Referee: Rainer Werthmann (Bochum)

11 September 1993 DFB-Pokal – R3	Eintracht Braunschweig	0 – 1	Tennis Borussia Berlin	Eintracht-Stadion, Braunschweig
	Meisner (yellow card) Hoffart (yellow card)	Report	Aksoy 85' (pen.); Rusyayev (yellow card) Flad (yellow card)	Attendance: 4,300; Referee: Torsten Koop (Lüttenmark)

18 September 1993 2. Bundesliga	FC Bayer 05 Uerdingen	3 – 1	Tennis Borussia Berlin	Grotenburg-Stadion, Krefeld
15:30	Peschke 26'; Steffen 60' (pen.); Bittengel 90'; Kutschera (yellow card)	Report	Flad 41'; Schröder (yellow card) Vogel (yellow card); Keim (red card) 73'	Attendance: 2,300; Referee: Frank Kiefer (Baunatal)

26 September 1993 2. Bundesliga	Tennis Borussia Berlin	0 – 1	SC Fortuna Köln	Mommsenstadion, Berlin
15:00	Aksoy (yellow card) Muschiol (yellow card); Lenz (yellow card) 72' (yellow-red card)	Report	Deffke 64'	Attendance: 1,400; Referee: Hofmann (Ansbach)

3 October 1993 2. Bundesliga	Hertha BSC	3 – 0	Tennis Borussia Berlin	Olympiastadion, Berlin
15:00	Gries 20' (pen.); Schmöller 69'; Ogris 83'; Zimmermann (yellow card) Kovač (yellow card)	Report	Tretschok (yellow card) Rusyayev (yellow card); Aksoy (yellow card) 49' (yellow-red card)	Attendance: 16,000; Referee: Hans-Peter Best (Kämpfelbach)

9 October 1993 2. Bundesliga	Tennis Borussia Berlin	0 – 1	SV Waldhof Mannheim	Mommsenstadion, Berlin
15:30	Kapagiannidis (yellow card) Rusyayev (yellow card)	Report	Hecker 75'; Köpper (yellow card) Larsen (yellow card) Hofmann (yellow card) Epp (yellow card)	Attendance: 1,500; Referee: Bernd Hauer (Celle)

17 October 1993 2. Bundesliga	VfL Wolfsburg	2 – 1	Tennis Borussia Berlin	VfL-Stadion am Elsterweg, Wolfsburg
15:00	Winter 71', 81'	Report	Goldbæk 19'; Schröder (yellow card) Aksoy (yellow card) Goldbæk (yellow card) Tretschok (yellow card) Vogel (yellow card); Hey (yellow card) 70' (yellow-red card)	Attendance: 5,000; Referee: Herbert Fandel (Kyllburg)

23 October 1993 2. Bundesliga	Tennis Borussia Berlin	0 – 1	FC 08 Homburg	Mommsenstadion, Berlin
14:30	Schröder (yellow card)	Report	Freiler 61'; Freiler (yellow card) Wruck (yellow card) Kluge (yellow card) Linke (yellow card) Müller (yellow card)	Attendance: 1,100; Referee: Lutz Pohlmann (Felde)

27 October 1993 DFB-Pokal – R4	FC Bayern München (A)	3 – 3 (a.e.t.) (4 – 5 p)	Tennis Borussia Berlin	Grünwalder Stadion, Munich
	Stegmayer 13'; Grill 62'; Hamann 114' (pen.); Grimm (yellow card) Hamann (yellow card)	Report	Vogel 29'; Schröder 41'; Boer 111'; Lenz (yellow card) Wehrmann (yellow card) Hillringhaus (yellow card); Vogel (yellow card) 64' (yellow-red card)	Attendance: 1,400; Referee: Günther Frey (Neu-Ulm)
	Penalties
	Frey (penalty scored); Hamann (penalty scored); Protzel (penalty scored); Karatayev (penalty scored); Zickler (penalty missed)		(penalty scored) Hey; (penalty scored) Goldbæk; (penalty scored) Muschiol; (penalty scored) Aksoy; (penalty scored) Goulet

31 October 1993 2. Bundesliga	Chemnitzer FC	1 – 0	Tennis Borussia Berlin	Stadion an der Gellertstraße, Chemnitz
15:00	Renn 78'; Gerber (yellow card)	Report	Lenz (yellow card) Aksoy (yellow card)	Attendance: 3,200; Referee: Uwe Kemmling (Kleinburgwedel)

7 November 1993 2. Bundesliga	Tennis Borussia Berlin	1 – 1	SV Meppen	Mommsenstadion, Berlin
15:00	Vogel 90'; Keim (yellow card)	Report	Rauffmann 8'; Vorholt (yellow card)	Attendance: 1,000; Referee: Heinz-Dieter Casper (Dortmund)

13 November 1993 2. Bundesliga	F.C. Hansa Rostock	2 – 1	Tennis Borussia Berlin	Ostseestadion, Rostock
15:30	Bodden 21'; Dowe 60'	Report	Vogel 75'	Attendance: 2,500; Referee: Reinhard Kuhne (Hamburg)

21 November 1993 2. Bundesliga	Tennis Borussia Berlin	2 – 2	Rot-Weiss Essen	Mommsenstadion, Berlin
15:00	Rusyayev 27', 29'; Levý (yellow card)	Report	Grein 15'; Bangoura 83'	Attendance: 1,000; Referee: Lutz Wagner (Kriftel)

28 November 1993 2. Bundesliga	Stuttgarter Kickers	3 – 1	Tennis Borussia Berlin	Waldau-Stadion, Stuttgart
14:15	Bobic 33', 45'; Moutas 70'	Report	Goldbæk 74'	Attendance: 2,600; Referee: Michael Malbranc (Hamburg)

1 December 1993 DFB-Pokal – QF	SC Freiburg	0 – 1	Tennis Borussia Berlin	Dreisamstadion, Freiburg im Breisgau
		Report	Keim 16'; Schröder (yellow card) Tretschok (yellow card)	Attendance: 9,000; Referee: Manfred Führer (Steinhagen (Westf.))

4 December 1993 2. Bundesliga	Tennis Borussia Berlin	0 – 0	FC Carl Zeiss Jena	Mommsenstadion, Berlin
15:30		Report	Fankhänel (yellow card)	Attendance: 1,800; Referee: Hans Fux (Stutensee)

19 February 1994 2. Bundesliga	1. FSV Mainz 05	1 – 4	Tennis Borussia Berlin	Stadion am Bruchweg, Mainz
15:00	Wagner 86'; Klopp (yellow card) Brinkmann (yellow card)	Report	Hey 39'; Rusyayev 44', 52'; Keim 78'; Muschiol (yellow card) Rusyayev (yellow card)	Attendance: 2,700; Referee: Hartmut Strampe (Handorf)

26 February 1994 2. Bundesliga	Tennis Borussia Berlin	1 – 2	Hannover 96	Mommsenstadion, Berlin
15:30	Keim 22'; Sazlog (yellow card)	Report	Groth 67'; Gries 73'; Kuhlmey (yellow card)	Attendance: 1,600; Referee: Roland Schäfer (Frankenthal)

4 March 1994 2. Bundesliga	1. FC Saarbrücken	2 – 2	Tennis Borussia Berlin	Ludwigsparkstadion, Saarbrücken
19:30	Shelia 61'; Wynalda 63'; Savichev (yellow card)	Report	Rusyayev 71'; Kapagiannidis 77'; Goldbæk (yellow card)	Attendance: 5,600; Referee: Hans-Jürgen Kasper (Katlenburg)

8 March 1994 DFB-Pokal – SF	Rot-Weiss Essen	2 – 0	Tennis Borussia Berlin	Georg-Melches-Stadion, Essen
	Bangoura 27'; Margref 66'; Pickenäcker (yellow card) Spyrka (yellow card) Lipinski (yellow card)	Report	Rusyayev (yellow card) Kapagiannidis (yellow card); Vogel (red card) 75'	Attendance: 22,000; Referee: Hans-Joachim Osmers (Bremen)

12 March 1994 2. Bundesliga	Tennis Borussia Berlin	1 – 0	TSV 1860 München	Mommsenstadion, Berlin
15:30	Rusyayev 76'; Flad (yellow card) Rusyayev (yellow card) Sazlog (yellow card)	Report	Kientz (yellow card)	Attendance: 2,300; Referee: Bernd Domurat (Datteln)

18 March 1994 2. Bundesliga	VfL Bochum	5 – 1	Tennis Borussia Berlin	Ruhrstadion, Bochum
20:00	von Ahlen 28'; Stöver 38', 40'; Wegmann 47' (pen.); Peschel 77'; Eberl (yellow card)	Report	Goldbæk 53'; Keim (yellow card)	Attendance: 12,000; Referee: Hofmann (Ansbach)

26 March 1994 2. Bundesliga	Tennis Borussia Berlin	1 – 1	Wuppertaler SV	Mommsenstadion, Berlin
15:30	Hey 29'; Muschiol (yellow card)	Report	Klein 63'; Schwinkendorf (yellow card) Matysik (yellow card) Breitzke (yellow card)	Attendance: 1,000; Referee: Günther Habermann (Weißensee)

2 April 1994 2. Bundesliga	FC St. Pauli	2 – 1	Tennis Borussia Berlin	Millerntor-Stadion, Hamburg
15:30	Driller 67'; Marin 79'; Mayer (yellow card)	Report	Rusyayev 45'; Flad (yellow card) Aksoy (yellow card) Goldbæk (yellow card) Kobylański (yellow card)	Attendance: 15,000; Referee: Aron Schmidhuber (Ottobrunn)

5 April 1994 2. Bundesliga	Tennis Borussia Berlin	1 – 1	FC Bayer 05 Uerdingen	Mommsenstadion, Berlin
19:30	Levý 50'; Keim (yellow card)	Report	Gorlukovich 60'; Dreher (yellow card) Rahner (yellow card) Laessig (yellow card) Hahn (yellow card)	Attendance: 900; Referee: Winfried Buchhart (Schrobenhausen)

9 April 1994 2. Bundesliga	SC Fortuna Köln	3 – 1	Tennis Borussia Berlin	Südstadion, Cologne
15:00	Beck 26'; Präger 82'; Deffke 84'; Niedziella (yellow card) Akonnor (yellow card)	Report	Tretschok 45'	Attendance: 600; Referee: Volkmar Fischer (St. Wendel)

23 April 1994 2. Bundesliga	SV Waldhof Mannheim	2 – 2	Tennis Borussia Berlin	Carl-Benz-Stadion, Mannheim
15:30	Kirsten 9', 43' (pen.)	Report	Goldbæk 52'; Rusyayev 60'	Attendance: 5,000; Referee: Jürgen Aust (Cologne)

30 April 1994 2. Bundesliga	Tennis Borussia Berlin	3 – 2	VfL Wolfsburg	Mommsenstadion, Berlin
15:30	Levý 30', 44'; Rusyayev 72'; Keim (yellow card) Levý (yellow card)	Report	Reich 9'; Winter 65'; Lieberam (yellow card); Akrapović (yellow card) 82' (yellow-red card)	Attendance: 1,000; Referee: Michael Prengel (Düsseldorf)

3 May 1994 2. Bundesliga	Tennis Borussia Berlin	1 – 2	Hertha BSC	Mommsenstadion, Berlin
19:30	Goldbæk 90'; Muschiol (yellow card) Tretschok (yellow card)	Report	Rohde 30'; Ogris 74'; Tanjga (yellow card) Kovač (yellow card) Zernicke (yellow card) Schmöller (yellow card)	Attendance: 6,800; Referee: Hans-Jürgen Weber (Essen)

7 May 1994 2. Bundesliga	FC 08 Homburg	0 – 2	Tennis Borussia Berlin	Waldstadion Homburg, Homburg
14:30	Landgraf (yellow card) Linke (yellow card) da Silva (red card) 89'	Report	Hey 35'; Backasch 88'; Pieckenhagen (yellow card) Aksoy (yellow card) Backasch (yellow card); Kobylański (red card) 89'	Attendance: 1,000; Referee: Heinz-Dieter Casper (Dortmund)

13 May 1994 2. Bundesliga	Tennis Borussia Berlin	0 – 0	Chemnitzer FC	Mommsenstadion, Berlin
19:30		Report	Neustädter (yellow card) Wahl (yellow card)	Attendance: 1,000; Referee: Hofmann (Ansbach)

20 May 1994 2. Bundesliga	SV Meppen	2 – 1	Tennis Borussia Berlin	Emslandstadion, Meppen
18:30	Rauffmann 15', 68'; Szewczyk (yellow card)	Report	Backasch 9'; Aksoy (yellow card) Tretschok (yellow card)	Attendance: 3,000; Referee: Lutz Wagner (Kriftel)

25 May 1994 2. Bundesliga	Tennis Borussia Berlin	0 – 0	F.C. Hansa Rostock	Mommsenstadion, Berlin
19:30	Civa (yellow card) Aksoy (yellow card) Schröder (yellow card)	Report	Bodden (yellow card) Hoffmann (yellow card)	Attendance: 800; Referee: Peter Weise (Gera)

28 May 1994 2. Bundesliga	Rot-Weiss Essen	4 – 6	Tennis Borussia Berlin	Georg-Melches-Stadion, Essen
14:30	Kurth 23', 82'; Kontny 28'; Djappa 66'; Jack (yellow card) Kontny (yellow card)	Report	Muschiol 8', 77'; Hey 12', 65'; Schröder 71'; Rusyayev 78'; Hillringhaus (yellow card) Aksoy (yellow card) Levý (yellow card)	Attendance: 2,826; Referee: Ratzek

4 June 1994 2. Bundesliga	Tennis Borussia Berlin	2 – 2	Stuttgarter Kickers	Mommsenstadion, Berlin
15:30	Hey 4'; Kapagiannidis 87'; Civa (yellow card) Sandstø (yellow card); Wehrmann (yellow card) 40' (yellow-red card)	Report	Wüllbier 13', 35'; Minkwitz (yellow card)	Attendance: 1,000; Referee: Rainer Werthmann (Bochum)

11 June 1994 2. Bundesliga	FC Carl Zeiss Jena	0 – 2	Tennis Borussia Berlin	Ernst-Abbe-Sportfeld, Jena
15:30	Schön (yellow card) Holetschek (yellow card) Akpoborie (yellow card)	Report	Krznarić 40'; Hey 85'; Aksoy (yellow card) Krznarić (yellow card) Levý (yellow card)	Attendance: 7,700; Referee: Hans-Joachim Osmers (Bremen)

== Player statistics ==
Pos	Player	Apps	Goals	Apps	Goals	Apps	Goals
Pos	Player	2. Bundesliga		DFB-Pokal		Total	
DF	(Turkey) Taşkın Aksoy	31	0	4	1	35	1
MF	(Germany) Olaf Backasch	16	2	0	0	16	2
FW	(Germany) Thorsten Boer	13	0	3	1	16	1
DF	(Bosnia and Herzegovina) Almedin Civa	4	0	0	0	4	0
DF	(Germany) Egon Flad	23	1	2	0	25	1
MF	(Denmark) Bjarne Goldbæk	24	5	3	0	27	5
MF	(United States) Brent Goulet	11	0	2	1	13	1
MF	(Hungary) Gyula Hajszán	3	0	1	0	4	0
FW	(Germany) Jens Henschel	12	0	0	0	12	0
MF	(Germany) Antoine Hey	27	7	3	0	30	7
GK	(Germany) Gerald Hillringhaus	31	0	5	0	36	0
DF	(Germany) Olaf Kapagiannidis	30	2	4	0	34	2
DF	(Germany) Andreas Keim	28	2	4	1	32	3
FW	(Poland) Andrzej Kobylański	10	0	2	0	12	0
MF	(Croatia) Davor Krznarić	1	1	0	0	1	1
DF	(Germany) Jörn Lenz	11	0	3	0	14	0
MF	(Czech Republic) Stanislav Levý	20	3	1	0	21	3
DF	(Germany) Dirk Muschiol	27	2	4	0	31	2
GK	(Germany) Martin Pieckenhagen	8	0	0	0	8	0
FW	(Russia) Mikhail Rusyayev	33	11	4	2	37	13
MF	(Norway) Arne Sandstø	7	0	2	0	9	0
DF	(Turkey) Tekin Sazlog	10	0	1	0	11	0
DF	(Germany) Michael Schröder	21	2	4	1	25	3
DF	(Germany) Klaus Theiss	3	0	0	0	3	0
MF	(Germany) René Tretschok	26	1	3	0	29	1
FW	(Germany) René Unglaube	3	0	0	0	3	0
FW	(Germany) Thomas Vogel	18	3	4	2	22	5
MF	(Germany) Jan Wehrmann	32	0	5	0	37	0

== Final league position – 19th ==
1993–94 2. Fußball-Bundesliga: extract from the final league table
Pos	Team	Pld	W	D	L	GF	GA	GD	Points
1	VfL Bochum (C)	38	19	10	9	56	34	+22	48:28
18	Wuppertaler SV (R)	38	10	11	17	44	52	–8	31:45
19	Tennis Borussia Berlin (R)	38	7	12	19	42	60	–18	26:50
20	Rot-Weiss Essen (R)	0	0	0	0	0	0	0	0:0 (Note: Rot-Weiss Essen had their results annulled and their license for the following season revoked due to financial irregularities.)
