= 1993–94 2. Bundesliga =

20th season of the second-tier football league in Germany

2. Bundesliga
- Season: 1993–94
- Champions: VfL Bochum
- Promoted: VfL Bochum; Bayer Uerdingen; TSV 1860 Munich
- Relegated: Stuttgarter Kickers; FC Carl Zeiss Jena; Wuppertaler SV; Rot-Weiss Essen; Tennis Borussia Berlin
- Matches played: 380
- Top goalscorer: Uwe Wegmann (22 goals)
- Average attendance: 6,973

The 1993–94 2. Bundesliga season was the twentieth season of the 2. Bundesliga, the second tier of the German football league system. It was the last season the league consisted of twenty clubs as it would operate with eighteen from 1994 to 1995 onwards.

SC Freiburg, Bayer Uerdingen and TSV 1860 Munich were promoted to the Bundesliga while Stuttgarter Kickers, FC Carl Zeiss Jena, Wuppertaler SV, Rot-Weiss Essen and Tennis Borussia Berlin were relegated to the newly introduced Regionalliga.

== League table ==
For the 1993–94 season TSV 1860 Munich, Rot-Weiss Essen and Tennis Borussia Berlin were newly promoted to the 2. Bundesliga from the Oberliga while VfL Bochum, Bayer 05 Uerdingen and 1. FC Saarbrücken had been relegated to the league from the Bundesliga.

Locations of the participating teams of the 1993–94 season

Pos	Team	Pld	W	D	L	GF	GA	GD	Pts	Promotion or relegation
1	VfL Bochum (C, P)	38	19	10	9	56	34	+22	48	Promotion to Bundesliga
2	Bayer 05 Uerdingen (P)	38	18	11	9	49	30	+19	47	Promotion to Bundesliga
3	1860 Munich (P)	38	19	9	10	55	38	+17	47	Promotion to Bundesliga
4	FC St. Pauli	38	17	11	10	47	39	+8	45	
5	VfL Wolfsburg	38	15	10	13	47	45	+2	40	
6	Waldhof Mannheim	38	12	16	10	45	45	0	40	
7	SV Meppen	38	14	11	13	48	52	−4	39	
8	Hansa Rostock	38	15	9	14	51	56	−5	39	
9	Chemnitzer FC	38	14	11	13	34	44	−10	39	
10	FC Homburg	38	13	11	14	53	46	+7	37	
11	Hertha BSC	38	11	15	12	48	42	+6	37	
12	Hannover 96	38	12	13	13	49	46	+3	37	
13	Mainz 05	38	13	11	14	46	51	−5	37	
14	1. FC Saarbrücken	38	14	9	15	58	69	−11	37	
15	Fortuna Köln	38	13	10	15	43	49	−6	36	
16	Stuttgarter Kickers (R)	38	11	13	14	42	50	−8	35	Relegation to Regionalliga (Note: Carl Zeiss Jena, and Tennis Borussia Berlin were relegated to Regionalliga Nordost. Stuttgarter Kickers were relegated to Regionalliga Süd. Wuppertaler SV, and Rot-Weiss Essen were relegated to Regionalliga Südwest.)
17	Carl Zeiss Jena (R)	38	9	16	13	38	41	−3	34	Relegation to Regionalliga
18	Wuppertaler SV (R)	38	10	11	17	44	52	−8	31	Relegation to Regionalliga
19	Tennis Borussia Berlin (R)	38	7	12	19	42	60	−18	26	Relegation to Regionalliga
20	Rot-Weiss Essen (Note: Rot-Weiss Essen had their results annulled and were not granted a license due to financial irregularities.) (R)	0	0	0	0	0	0	0	0	Relegation to Regionalliga

Source: Bundesliga.de
Rules for classification: 1) points; 2) goal difference; 3) number of goals scored.
(C) Champions; (P) Promoted; (R) Relegated

== Results ==
Home \ Away	BSC	TBB	BOC	CFC	RWE	H96	HOM	JEN	FKO	M05	WMA	SVM	M60	ROS	FCS	STP	SKI	B05	WOB	WSV
Hertha BSC	—	3–0	1–1	1–2	3–4	0–0	1–0	0–0	1–1	5–0	1–0	1–1	0–1	0–1	3–1	2–1	0–0	1–1	4–0	0–3
Tennis Borussia Berlin	1–2	—	1–1	0–0	2–2	1–2	0–1	0–0	0–1	0–1	0–1	1–1	1–0	0–0	0–4	0–0	2–2	1–1	3–2	1–1
VfL Bochum	3–1	5–1	—	3–2	2–0	2–2	1–4	3–0	1–0	2–0	0–1	4–0	2–0	2–0	4–0	1–1	3–1	0–0	2–0	1–0
Chemnitzer FC	1–1	1–0	1–0	—	2–1	1–0	2–1	0–0	1–0	0–0	0–0	2–1	1–1	3–0	3–1	0–0	1–0	1–4	1–1	0–0
Rot-Weiss Essen	2–0	4–6	0–2	0–1	—	0–2	3–3	0–5	3–0	0–0	2–0	4–1	1–4	2–0	3–1	0–0	0–0	0–2	0–1	0–0
Hannover 96	0–2	0–1	0–0	0–0	2–0	—	1–3	1–0	0–2	1–1	1–1	1–1	1–4	5–0	4–1	4–1	1–0	2–1	2–0	2–0
FC Homburg	1–1	0–2	0–0	4–0	1–1	2–0	—	2–1	1–2	1–0	3–0	5–0	0–0	0–2	2–2	2–1	3–2	0–1	0–0	2–2
Carl Zeiss Jena	1–1	0–2	0–0	0–2	2–0	2–2	2–1	—	2–2	2–0	2–2	0–0	1–1	0–0	1–2	1–0	0–0	0–2	2–0	2–1
Fortuna Köln	1–3	3–1	1–2	0–1	0–1	4–1	2–1	1–1	—	1–2	0–0	1–1	0–0	0–0	7–4	1–2	2–1	0–1	2–0	3–0
Mainz 05	1–1	1–4	3–2	5–1	1–1	1–0	1–1	2–0	0–3	—	2–1	3–0	1–1	3–1	1–1	0–1	4–0	1–1	1–2	1–1
Waldhof Mannheim	2–2	2–2	1–0	1–0	2–2	1–1	2–1	2–0	1–1	1–0	—	2–1	1–1	3–3	3–0	0–0	0–1	2–0	1–1	2–0
SV Meppen	1–0	2–1	0–1	2–1	2–1	4–1	2–1	1–1	4–2	1–1	1–0	—	0–1	4–1	3–0	1–1	2–2	0–2	2–1	2–1
1860 Munich	1–0	2–1	4–1	3–1	1–0	2–2	1–0	2–0	2–1	0–2	3–1	1–2	—	1–2	2–0	1–0	1–3	0–0	4–0	3–1
Hansa Rostock	2–2	2–1	2–1	2–0	0–2	3–1	3–2	0–0	1–1	2–3	1–0	1–1	4–0	—	3–1	0–1	2–0	2–0	2–0	0–1
1. FC Saarbrücken	4–2	2–2	0–1	1–0	3–1	0–4	0–0	2–1	4–1	2–0	1–1	1–1	0–2	4–0	—	1–1	3–0	2–1	2–1	1–0
FC St. Pauli	1–0	2–1	1–1	3–0	1–0	2–1	3–0	2–1	3–2	1–0	4–1	1–0	2–1	2–4	1–1	—	3–0	0–0	1–0	1–2
Stuttgarter Kickers	1–1	3–1	0–0	2–0	4–2	0–0	2–3	0–2	0–0	4–1	4–2	1–0	0–2	3–2	2–2	1–1	—	0–2	0–0	1–0
Bayer Uerdingen	0–0	3–1	3–0 (Note: The Bayer Uerdingen v VfL Bochum match from 9 May 1994, which finished with a score of 3–1, was annulled by the DFB and was required to be replayed due to VfL Bochum player Andreas Wessels being hit by a piece of dry ice, requiring him to be substituted off. The replay took place on 31 May 1994 and finished with a score of 3–0.)	2–0	2–0	3–2	0–1	0–0	0–2	3–0	1–2	1–0	1–0	2–1	1–3	3–0	1–1	—	0–0	1–1
VfL Wolfsburg	1–0	2–1	0–1	2–0	2–2	0–0	2–0	5–1	2–1	2–0	2–2	3–2	0–0	1–1	3–1	4–1	1–0	3–0	—	2–1
Wuppertaler SV	1–2	1–0	3–1	2–2	0–0	0–0	1–1	0–5	1–2	1–3	1–1	0–1	5–2	4–1	4–0	2–1	0–1	1–3	2–1	—

Source: DFB
Legend: Blue = home team win; Yellow = draw; Red = away team win.

== Top scorers ==
The league's top scorers:

Goals	Player	Team
22	(Germany) Uwe Wegmann	VfL Bochum
18	(Austria) Peter Pacult	TSV 1860 Munich
16	(Germany) Fredi Bobic	Stuttgarter Kickers
16	(Germany) Bernhard Winkler	TSV 1860 Munich
15	(Germany) Jörg Kirsten	SV Waldhof Mannheim
14	(Germany) René Deffke	Fortuna Köln
14	(Germany) Theo Gries	Hannover 96/Hertha BSC Berlin
14	(Germany) Rainer Rauffmann	SV Meppen
14	(Germany) Siegfried Reich	VfL Wolfsburg
13	(Germany) Olaf Bodden	Hansa Rostock
