= Kemal Halat =

Turkish football coach and former player

Personal information
- Full name: Namık Kemal Halat
- Date of birth: 5 July 1971 (age 55)
- Place of birth: Tunceli, Turkey
- Height: 1.85 m (6 ft 1 in)
- Position: Defender

Youth career
- CFC Hertha 06
- –1991: BFC Preussen

Senior career*
Years	Team	Apps	(Gls)
1991–1993	Berlin Türkspor 1965	37	(1)
1993–1994	Reinickendorfer Füchse	24	(1)
1994–1995	Kocaelispor	17	(1)
1995–1998	1. FC Nürnberg	42	(1)
1998–1999	FC Gütersloh	28	(0)
1999–2001	Fortuna Düsseldorf	49	(2)
2001–2003	VfL Osnabrück	62	(3)
2003–2004	Türkiyemspor Berlin		
2004	Berliner AK 07	6	(0)
2004–2005	BFC Dynamo	21	(1)
2005–2006	Reinickendorfer Füchse		
2006	SV Yeşilyurt	14	(1)
2006–2007	Berliner AK 07	10	(0)
Total		310+	(11+)

Managerial career
- 2008–2009: Liberia (assistant)
- 2009: Kenya (assistant)
- 2014–2015: Libya U20
- 2017: CFC Hertha 06
- * Club domestic league appearances and goals

Namık Kemal Halat (born 5 July 1971) is a Turkish football coach and former player who last worked as the head coach of German club CFC Hertha 06.

== Playing career ==
Halat started his senior career with Berlin Türkspor 1965. In 1994, he signed for Kocaelispor in the Turkish Süper Lig, where he made eighteen appearances in all competitions and scored one goal. After that, he played for Nürnberg, Gütersloh 2000, Fortuna Düsseldorf, VfL Osnabrück, Türkiyemspor Berlin, Berliner AK 07, Berliner Dynamo, Füchse Berlin Reinickendorf, and SV Yeşilyurt.
