= Wruck =

Wruck is a German surname. Notable people with the surname include:

- Darcy Wruck (born 1995), Australian rower
- Dylan Wruck (born 1992), Canadian-German ice hockey forward
- Jacqueline Wruck (born 1998), German model
- Julian Wruck (born 1991), Australian discus thrower
- Larry Wruck (born 1962), Canadian football linebacker
- Torsten Wruck (born 1969), German football defender

== See also ==
- Wrucke, another surname
