= Wolfgang Sandhowe =

German footballer and manager

Personal information
- Date of birth: 14 December 1953 (age 72)
- Place of birth: Ascheberg, West Germany
- Height: 1.81 m (5 ft 11 in)
- Position: Forward

Team information
- Current team: TuS Makkabi Berlin (manager)

Youth career
- TuS Ascheberg
- Ahlener SV
- SV Herbern

Senior career*
Years	Team	Apps	(Gls)
1978–1979	KSV Baunatal	36	(6)
1979–1980	FSV Frankfurt	34	(13)
1980–1981	Preußen Münster	35	(6)
1981–1983	Hammer SpVg		
1983–1984	Göttingen 05		
1984–1985	VfL Osnabrück	3	(1)
- SG Düren 99

Managerial career
- 1986–1987: VfL Bochum Amateure
- 1987–1988: Galatasaray S.K. (assistant)
- 1990–1992: Türkiyemspor Berlin
- 1992–1994: Reinickendorfer Füchse
- 1994–1995: 1. FC Nürnberg (assistant)
- 1995–1997: LR Ahlen
- 1997–1998: Spandauer SV
- 1998–1999: Eintracht Braunschweig
- 1999–2001: Lok Altmark Stendal
- 2001–2002: Carl Zeiss Jena
- 2002–2003: SV Babelsberg 03
- 2003: Türkiyemspor Berlin
- 2004–2005: Reinickendorfer Füchse
- 2006–2007: Hammer SpVg
- 2009–2010: 1. FC Lok Stendal
- 2010–2011: 1. FC Magdeburg II
- 2011: 1. FC Magdeburg
- 2016–2018: Berliner SC
- 2018–2019: Türkiyemspor Berlin
- 2019–: TuS Makkabi Berlin
- * Club domestic league appearances and goals

Wolfgang Sandhowe (born 14 December 1953) is a German professional football manager and former player who is the manager of NOFV-Oberliga Nord club TuS Makkabi Berlin. As a player, he spent three seasons in the 2. Bundesliga with KSV Baunatal, FSV Frankfurt, and Preußen Münster. After retiring from playing, Sandhowe began a managing career. Since then, he has worked mostly at the third and fourth level of the German football league system. Most recently, he managed 1. FC Magdeburg, where he was released in October 2011.
