= Taşkın Aksoy =

German footballer and manager

Personal information
- Date of birth: 13 June 1967 (age 59)
- Place of birth: West Berlin, West Germany
- Height: 1.83 m (6 ft 0 in)
- Position: Defender

Youth career
- Hertha BSC

Senior career*
Years	Team	Apps	(Gls)
1986–1989	Hertha BSC	36	(3)
1989–1991	Boluspor		
1991–1993	Türkiyemspor Berlin		
1993–1997	Tennis Borussia Berlin	115	(11)
1997–1998	Kocaelispor	15	(1)
1998–1999	Kayserispor		
1999–2001	Tennis Borussia Berlin II	34	(4)
1999–2002	Tennis Borussia Berlin	43	(5)
2002–2004	SV Yeşilyurt	62	(25)
Total		305	(49)

Managerial career
- 2007–2008: Berliner AK 07
- 2009–2010: Türkiyemspor Berlin
- 2012–2015: Fortuna Düsseldorf II
- 2015: Fortuna Düsseldorf (caretaker)
- 2015–2018: Fortuna Düsseldorf II
- 2020: Gençlerbirliği (assistant)
- 2021: Ankaragücü (assistant)
- 2021–2022: Kayserispor (assistant)
- 2022: Gençlerbirliği
- * Club domestic league appearances and goals

Taşkın Aksoy (born 13 June 1967) is a German football manager and former player.

== Playing career ==
Aksoy began his career at Hertha BSC. Making his debut in 1986, he went on to make 36 appearances for the Olympic Stadium-based side. Having moved to Boluspor, he came back to his native Berlin to sign for Türkiyemspor. Aksoy played for Tennis Borussia Berlin between 1993 and 1997, scoring 11 goals in 115 games. After a disagreement with coach Hermann Gerland, Aksoy decided to leave Tennis Borussia and after receiving an offer from Süper Lig team Kocaelispor, moved to Turkey where he played 15 games for the İzmit outfit. Aksoy played a season at Kayserispor before being called up for military service. In an effort to defer it, Aksoy moved back to Berlin again and signed for TeBe. Unfit for first team football, Aksoy trained with the reserve team for a while before later going on to make 43 further appearances as Tennis Borussia were relegated twice in successive seasons. Aksoy saw out the remainder of his playing career at fellow Berliners SV Yeşilyurt before retiring in 2004.

== Managerial career ==
In 2007, Aksoy earned his UEFA Pro Licence and began coaching Berliner AK 07 in the NOFV-Oberliga. From the summer of 2009 until 11 October 2010, he had been the manager of Türkiyemspor Berlin. since the beginning of the 2012–13 season, he has been coaching the reserve team of Fortuna Düsseldorf in the Regionalliga West.

He was named the interim coach of the first team on 13 April 2015.
