= Pavel Galac =

Moldovan footballer

Personal information
- Date of birth: 6 September 1995 (age 31)
- Place of birth: Moldova
- Height: 1.95 m (6 ft 5 in)
- Position: Goalkeeper

Team information
- Current team: Spartanii Selemet
- Number: 1

Youth career
- –2016: Sheriff Tiraspol

Senior career*
Years	Team	Apps	(Gls)
2016–2017	Petrocub Hîncești	0	(0)
2017	Ungheni	10	(0)
2017–2018	Victoria Bardar		
2018	TuS Makkabi Berlin	11	(0)
2018–2019	Anker Wismar	6	(0)
2019	TuS Makkabi Berlin	8	(0)
2019–2020	BFC Tur Abdin		
2020–	Spartanii Selemet		

International career
2013	Moldova U19	3	(0)
- * Club domestic league appearances and goals

Pavel Galac (born 6 September 1995) is a Moldovan footballer who plays as a goalkeeper for Moldovan club CSF Spartanii Selemet.
