= Uwe Jahn =

Uwe Jahn may refer to:

- Uwe Jahn (football manager) (born 1954), German football coach
- Uwe Jahn (sprinter) (born 1971), German track and field sprinter
