= Mikhail Rusyayev =

Russian footballer

Personal information
- Full name: Mikhail Anatolyevich Rusyayev
- Date of birth: 15 November 1964
- Place of birth: Chaakhol, Tuva, Russian SFSR
- Date of death: 10 April 2011 (aged 46)
- Place of death: Moscow, Russia
- Height: 1.77 m (5 ft 10 in)
- Position: Striker

Senior career*
Years	Team	Apps	(Gls)
1982–1987	Spartak Moscow	32	(3)
1987–1989	Lokomotiv Moscow	78	(29)
1989–1990	Alemannia Aachen	11	(1)
1990–1992	VfB Oldenburg	53	(17)
1992	Spartak Moscow	15	(6)
1992–1996	Tennis Borussia Berlin	98	(45)
1996–2000	Carl Zeiss Jena	120	(24)
2000–2002	TuS Makkabi Berlin		

Managerial career
- 2000–2002: MFK Norilsk Nickel (Assistant coach)
- 2002: FC Torpedo-ZIL Moscow (Assistant coach)
- 2002–2003: MFK Norilsk Nickel
- * Club domestic league appearances and goals

Mikhail Anatolyevich Rusyayev (Russian: Михаил Анатольевич Русяев; 15 November 1964 – 10 April 2011) was a Russian professional footballer who played as a striker.

== Early life ==
Rusyayev was born in Chaakhol, Tuva and raised in Tos-Bulak.

== Career ==
He made his debut in the Soviet Top League in 1982 for FC Spartak Moscow. He played 126 professional games in Germany.

== Personal life ==
In 2005, Rusyayev suffered a stroke which left half of his body paralysed.

He died on 10 April 2011 in Moscow following complications from his stroke.

== Honours ==
- Soviet Top League champion: 1987; runner-up 1983, 1984, 1985; bronze 1982, 1986
- Soviet Cup finalist: 1990
- Russian Premier League champion: 1992
