= Lilli Henoch =

German track and field athlete

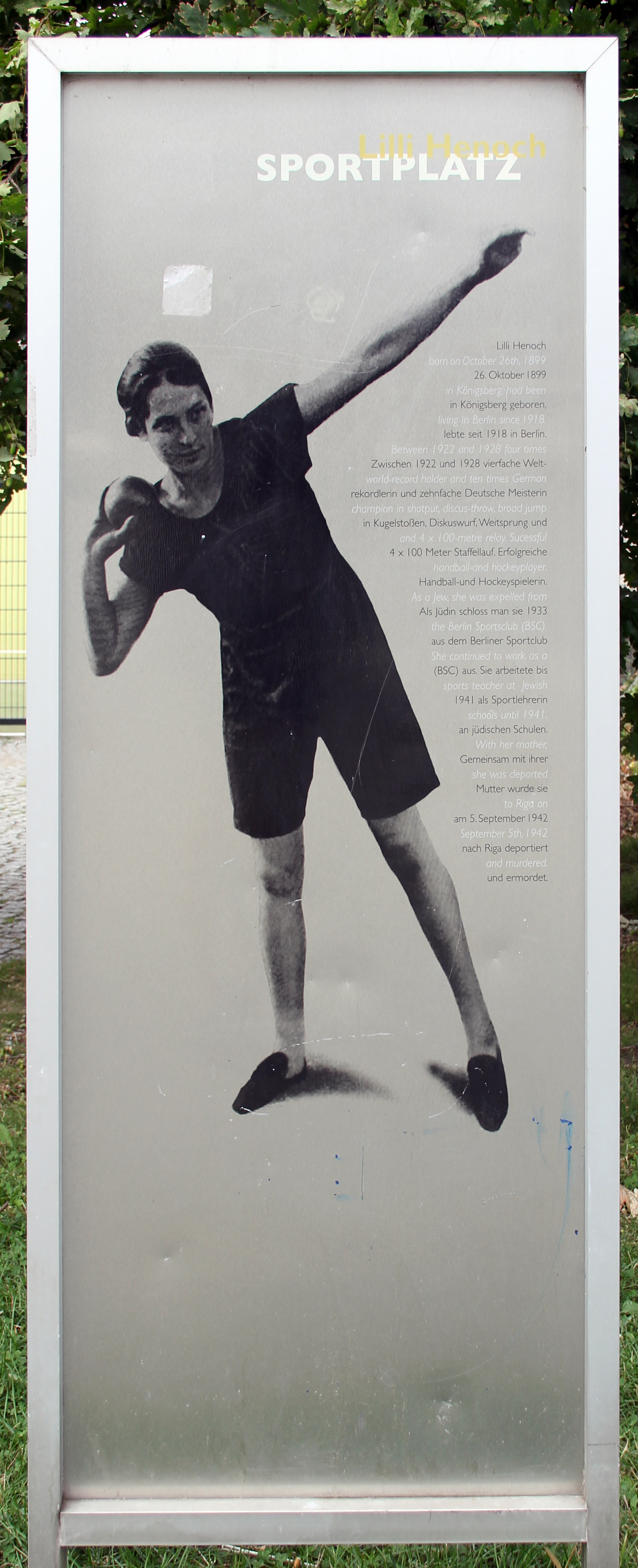
- Memorial plaque at Askanischer Platz 6, in Kreuzberg

Personal information
- Nationality: German
- Born: 26 October 1899 Königsberg, East Prussia, German Empire
- Died: 8 September 1942 (aged 42) Riga Ghetto, Reichskommissariat Ostland

Sport
- Sport: Track and field
- Events: Discus, long jump, shot put, 4 × 100 meters relay
- Club: Berlin Sports Club; Bar Kochba Berlin

Achievements and titles
- National finals: German national shot put champion (1922–25); German national discus champion (1923 & 1924); German national long jump champion (1924); German national 4 × 100 meters relay champion (1924–26)
- Highest world ranking: Discus world records (24.90 meters, 1922; 26.62 meters, 1923); Shot put world record (11.57 meters, 1925); 4 × 100-meters relay record (50.4 seconds, 1926)

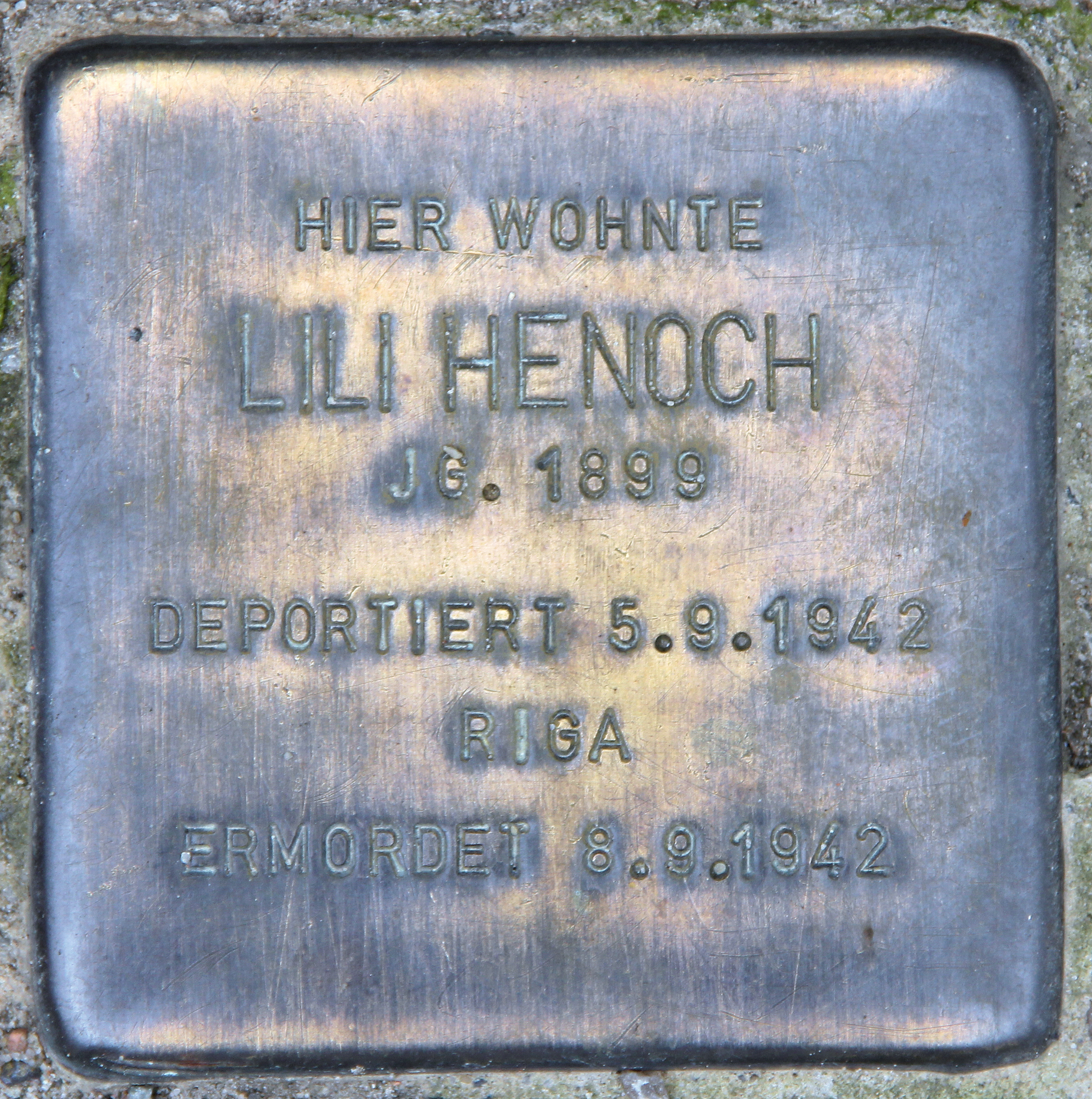
Stolperstein in front of house at Treuchtlinger Straße 5, Berlin-Schöneberg

Lilli Henoch (26 October 1899 – 8 September 1942) was a German track and field athlete who set four world records and won 10 German national championships, in four different disciplines.

Henoch set world records in the discus (twice), the shot put, and the 4 × 100 meters relay events. She also won German national championships in the shot put four times, the 4 × 100 meters relay three times, the discus twice, and the long jump. She was Jewish, and during the Holocaust she and her mother were deported and shot by the Nazis in the Riga Ghetto in September 1943.

== Early life ==
Henoch was Jewish, and was born in Königsberg, East Prussia (Germany). Her father, a businessman, died in 1912. She and her family moved to Berlin, and her mother subsequently remarried.

== Track and field career ==
Henoch set world records in the discus, shot put, and—with her teammates—4 × 100 meters relay events.

Between 1922 and 1926, she won 10 German national championships: in shot put, 1922–25; discus, 1923 and 1924; long jump, 1924; and 4 × 100 meters relay, 1924–26.

After World War I, Henoch joined the Berlin Sports Club (BSC), which was approximately one quarter Jewish. She missed a chance to compete in the 1924 Summer Olympics, because Germany was not allowed to participate in the Games after World War I. In 1924, she trained the women's section in Bar Kochba Berlin. She was a member of the BSC hockey team, which won the Berlin Hockey Championship in 1925.

=== Discus ===
She set a world record in discus on 1 October 1922, with a distance of 24.90 meters. She bettered this on 8 July 1923, with a throw of 26.62 meters. She won the German national championship in discus in 1923 and 1924, and won the silver medal in 1925.

=== Long jump ===
In 1924, Henoch won the German Long Jump Championship, having won the bronze medal in the event the prior year.

=== Shot put ===
On 16 August 1925 Henoch set a world shot put record with a throw of 11.57 meters. She won the German national championship in shot put in 1922–25, and won the silver medal in 1921 and 1926.

=== 4 × 100 meters relay ===
In 1926, she ran the first leg on a 4 × 100 meters relay world record—50.40 seconds—in Cologne, breaking the prior record that had stood for 1,421 days by a full second. She won the German national championship in the 4 × 100 meters relay in 1924–26.

=== 100 meter dash ===
In 1924, she won the silver medal at 100 meters in the German national championships.

=== Post-Nazi-rise disruption of career ===
After Adolf Hitler came to power in 1933, Henoch and all other Jews were forced to leave the membership of the BSC, by the Nazi's new race laws. She then joined the Jüdischer Turn-und Sportclub 1905 (Jewish Gymnastics and Sports Club 1905), which was limited to Jews, for which she played team handball and was a trainer. She also became a gymnastics teacher at a Jewish elementary school.

Because she was Jewish, the German government did not allow her to participate in the 1936 Summer Olympics.

== Killing ==
The Nazi German government deported Henoch, her 66-year-old mother, and her brother to the Riga Ghetto in Nazi Germany-occupied Latvia on 5 September 1942, during World War II. She and her mother were taken from the ghetto and shot by an Einsatzgruppen mobile killing unit in September 1942, along with a large number of other Jews taken from the ghetto. They were all buried in a mass grave near Riga, Latvia. Her brother Max Henoch was deported to Auschwitz on 19 April 1943. He was then sent to Langentstein Zwieberge on 9 February 1945. He starved to death there and died on April 1945.<https://gedenkstaette-langenstein.sachsen-anhalt.de/aktuelles>

== Hall of Fame and commemoration ==
Henoch was inducted into the International Jewish Sports Hall of Fame in 1990.

In 2008, a Stolperstein was installed in her honor in front of her former residence in Berlin.

== See also ==
- List of select Jewish track and field athletes
