= Wrucke =

Wrucke is a surname. Notable people with the surname include:

- H. Albert Wrucke (1868–1953), American politician and businessman
- Natalie Hemby Wrucke (born 1977), American country music songwriter and singer

== See also ==
- Wruck, another surname
