= Olaf Backasch =

German footballer

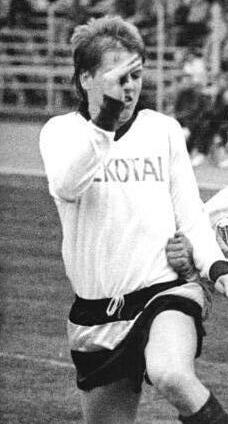
- Backasch in 1990

Personal information
- Full name: Olaf Backasch
- Date of birth: 4 October 1965 (age 61)
- Place of birth: Eisenhüttenstadt, East Germany
- Position: Midfielder

Youth career
- –1984: BSG Stahl Eisenhüttenstadt

Senior career*
Years	Team	Apps	(Gls)
1984–1991	BSG Stahl Eisenhüttenstadt		
1991–1992	FC Berlin		
1993–1994	Tennis Borussia Berlin	16	(2)
1996–2000	Eisenhüttenstädter FC Stahl		
- * Club domestic league appearances and goals

Olaf Backasch (born 4 October 1965) is a retired German footballer.

== Playing career ==
Backasch played for BSG Stahl Eisenhüttenstadt during the final years of the German Democratic Republic and reached the final of the 1990–91 NOFV-Pokal, where they lost 1–0 to F.C. Hansa Rostock. After a stint playing for FC Berlin, Backasch transferred to Tennis Borussia Berlin, making 16 appearances for them during the 1993–94 2. Bundesliga season. In 1996, he moved back to his home-town club Eisenhüttenstädter FC Stahl, where he played until his retirement in 2000.
