= Almedin Civa =

Bosnian footballer (born 1972)

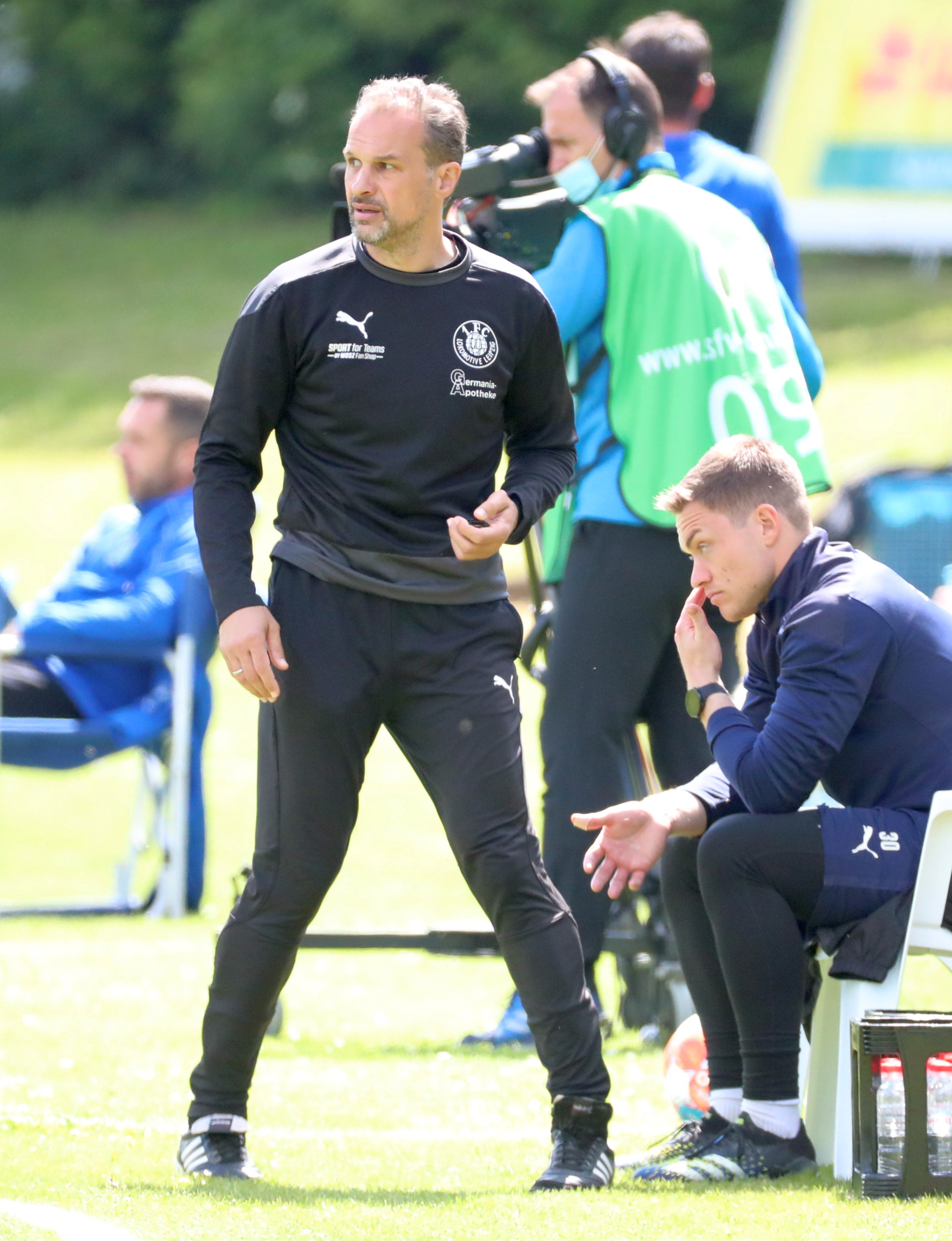
- Civa in 2021

Personal information
- Date of birth: 27 April 1972 (age 54)
- Place of birth: Breza, SR Bosnia and Herzegovina, Yugoslavia
- Height: 1.78 m (5 ft 10 in)
- Position: Defensive midfielder

Youth career
- –1990: Reinickendorfer Füchse
- 1990–1991: Tennis Borussia Berlin

Senior career*
Years	Team	Apps	(Gls)
1991–1996	Tennis Borussia Berlin	109	(1)
1996–1997	Reinickendorfer Füchse	33	(1)
1997–1998	Union Berlin	18	(2)
1998–1999	KFC Uerdingen 05	33	(0)
1999–2003	SV Babelsberg 03	129	(5)
2003–2004	VfB Leipzig	18	(0)
2004	FC Sachsen Leipzig	8	(0)
2004–2005	Hallescher FC	11	(1)
2005–2008	SV Yeşilyurt	66	(2)
2008–2012	SV Babelsberg 03	132	(6)
Total		539	(18)

Managerial career
- 2006: SV Yeşilyurt (caretaker)
- 2013: SV Babelsberg 03 (caretaker)
- 2017–2019: SV Babelsberg 03
- 2020–2024: 1. FC Lokomotive Leipzig
- * Club domestic league appearances and goals

Almedin Civa (born 27 April 1972) is a Bosnian retired footballer who was most recently the manager of 1. FC Lokomotive Leipzig. Before that he worked as sporting director at SV Babelsberg 03.

== Playing career ==
Civa, who played as a defender or midfielder, has spent his entire career in Germany, mainly playing in and around Berlin. He made 71 appearances in the 2. Bundesliga, for Tennis Borussia Berlin, KFC Uerdingen 05, and SV Babelsberg 03. He holds the Babelsberg's most appearances record with 261 league matches.

== Managerial statistics ==
As of 18 February 2024

Managerial record by team and tenure
Team	Nat	From	To	Record							
Team	Nat	From	To	G	W	D	L	GF	GA	GD	Win %
SV Babelsberg 03 (Caretaker)	(Germany)	9 April 2013	30 April 2013	6	1	2	3	6	7	−1	16.67
SV Babelsberg 03	(Germany)	1 July 2017	30 June 2019	76	32	21	23	131	90	+41	42.11
1. FC Lokomotive Leipzig	(Germany)	1 July 2020	19 February 2024	120	62	23	35	217	163	+54	51.67
Total				202	95	46	61	354	260	+94	47.03
