= Olaf Kapagiannidis =

German footballer

Personal information
- Full name: Olaf Kapagiannidis
- Date of birth: 11 June 1969 (age 57)
- Place of birth: Berlin-Spandau, West Germany
- Height: 1.77 m (5 ft 10 in)
- Position: Defender

Youth career
- SC Schwarz-Weiss Spandau
- Spandauer SV
- Reinickendorfer Füchse
- –1993: Türkiyemspor Berlin

Senior career*
Years	Team	Apps	(Gls)
1993–2000	Tennis Borussia Berlin	154	(2)
2000–2001	FC Sachsen Leipzig	16	(0)
2001–2005	Hertha BSC II	123	(5)
Total		293	(7)
- * Club domestic league appearances and goals

Olaf Kapagiannidis (born 11 June 1969 in Berlin-Spandau) is a former professional German footballer.

Kapagiannidis made 50 appearances in the 2. Fußball-Bundesliga for Tennis Borussia Berlin during his playing career.
