= Cemil Mengi =

Turkish footballer

Personal information
- Full name: Cemil Mengi
- Date of birth: 30 September 1986 (age 40)
- Place of birth: West Berlin, West Germany
- Height: 1.77 m (5 ft 10 in)
- Position: Midfielder

Team information
- Current team: CFC Hertha 06
- Number: 5

Youth career
- 2004–2006: Türkiyemspor Berlin

Senior career*
Years	Team	Apps	(Gls)
2006–2007	Çaykur Rizespor	4	(0)
2007	Turgutluspor	6	(1)
2007–2010	Gümüşhanespor	29	(3)
2010	Pazarspor	0	(0)
2010–2011	Tennis Borussia Berlin	8	(2)
2011	Türkiyemspor Berlin	12	(2)
2011–2013	BFC Viktoria 1889	24	(1)
2014	FSV 63 Luckenwalde	6	(1)
2014–	CFC Hertha 06	26	(4)
- * Club domestic league appearances and goals as of 6 September 2015

Cemil Mengi (born 30 September 1986 in West Berlin) is a Turkish footballer who plays for CFC Hertha 06.

Mengi came through the ranks of Türkiyemspor Berlin as a youth player before moving to Turkey where he made 4 appearances for Çaykur Rizespor in the Süper Lig. As of 2012, the attacking midfielder is playing for BFC Viktoria 1889.
