= Deniz Aydoğdu =

Turkish footballer

Personal information
- Full name: Deniz Aydoğdu
- Date of birth: 31 August 1983 (age 43)
- Place of birth: Berlin, Germany
- Height: 1.80 m (5 ft 11 in)
- Position: Striker

Youth career
- Hertha Zehlendorf

Senior career*
Years	Team	Apps	(Gls)
–2003	Reinickendorfer Füchse		
2003–2004	Tasmania-Gropiusstadt		
2004–2006	Türkiyemspor Berlin	31	(12)
2006–2007	Karşıyaka	18	(6)
2007–2009	Kasımpaşa	2	(0)
2008	→ Malatyaspor (loan)	7	(0)
2008	→ Mardinspor (loan)	12	(5)
2009	Tennis Borussia Berlin	10	(3)
2009	Balıkesirspor	6	(0)
2010	Türkiyemspor Berlin	4	(0)
- * Club domestic league appearances and goals

Deniz Aydoğdu (born 31 August 1983 in Berlin, Germany) is a Turkish footballer.

Aydoğdu made 2 appearances in the Süper Lig during his playing career.
