= René Deffke =

German footballer

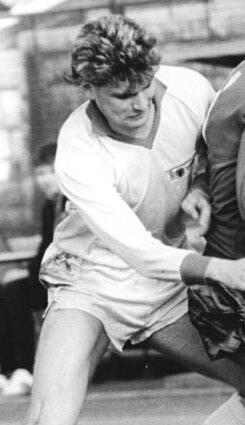
- Deffke in 1989

Personal information
- Full name: René Deffke
- Date of birth: 9 November 1966 (age 59)
- Place of birth: East Berlin, East Germany
- Height: 1.83 m (6 ft 0 in)
- Position: Striker

Team information
- Current team: BV Bad Lippspringe (manager)

Senior career*
Years	Team	Apps	(Gls)
1985–1986	BFC Dynamo II	23	(3)
1986–1988	Dynamo Fürstenwalde	66	(21)
1988–1989	Union Berlin	14	(2)
1989	Motor Ludwigsfelde	6	(2)
1989–1992	Blau-Weiß Berlin	72	(17)
1992–1994	Fortuna Köln	79	(27)
1994–1995	Hertha BSC	16	(2)
1995	VfL Wolfsburg	12	(0)
1995	Union Berlin	13	(1)
1995–1996	Carl Zeiss Jena	12	(0)
1996–1997	LR Ahlen	42	(25)
1997–1998	Eintracht Trier	22	(1)
1998–2000	Eintracht Braunschweig	29	(12)
Total		406	(113)

Managerial career
- 2008–2010: SG Osburg/Thomm
- 2011–2013: Suryoye Paderborn
- 2014–: BV Bad Lippspringe
- * Club domestic league appearances and goals

René Deffke (born 9 November 1966) is a German football manager and former player. He is currently the manager of BV Bad Lippspringe.

Early in his career, Deffke played one season in the East German Oberliga for 1. FC Union Berlin. After the German reunification, he went on to play eight seasons in the 2. Bundesliga, before playing mostly in the third tier of German football until he retired from the game in 2000.
