= Michael Schröder =

German footballer

Personal information
- Date of birth: 10 November 1959 (age 66)
- Place of birth: Germany
- Height: 1.84 m (6 ft 0 in)
- Position: Midfielder

Team information
- Current team: Hamburger SV (scout)

Senior career*
Years	Team	Apps	(Gls)
1980–1986	Hamburger SV	90	(19)
1986–1989	VfB Stuttgart	72	(4)
1989–1991	Hamburger SV	28	(0)
1993–1994	Tennis Borussia Berlin	21	(2)
- * Club domestic league appearances and goals

Michael Schröder (born 10 November 1959) is a German former professional footballer who played as a midfielder. He works as a scout for Hamburger SV.

== Honours ==
Hamburger SV

- European Cup: 1982–83
- UEFA Cup: runner-up 1981–82
- Bundesliga: 1981–82, 1982–83

VfB Stuttgart

- UEFA Cup: runner-up 1988–89
