= Andrzej Kobylański =

Polish footballer (born 1970)

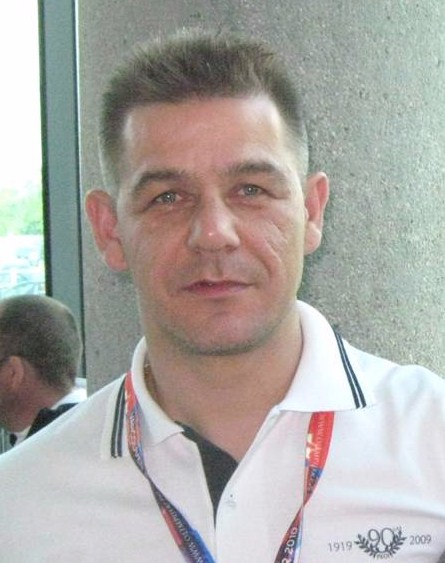

Personal information
- Full name: Andrzej Kobylański
- Date of birth: 31 July 1970 (age 56)
- Place of birth: Ostrowiec Świętokrzyski, Poland
- Height: 1.78 m (5 ft 10 in)
- Positions: Striker; midfielder

Senior career*
Years	Team	Apps	(Gls)
1988–1989	KSZO Ostrowiec		
1989–1993	Siarka Tarnobrzeg		
1993	1. FC Köln	12	(1)
1993–1994	Tennis Borussia Berlin	10	(0)
1994–1995	Hannover 96	39	(11)
1995–1997	Waldhof Mannheim	55	(16)
1997–1998	Widzew Łódź	33	(8)
1998–2000	Hannover 96	50	(10)
2000–2003	Energie Cottbus	76	(7)
2003–2004	Wisła Płock	23	(3)
2004–2005	Wuppertaler SV Borussia	7	(0)
2005–2007	SV Rot-Weiß Bad Muskau		

International career
- Poland Olympic
1992–1993	Poland	6	(0)

Managerial career
- 2012: Cracovia (assistant)
Medal record
Men's football
Representing Poland
Olympic Games
Silver medal – second place	1992 Barcelona	Team
- * Club domestic league appearances and goals

Andrzej Kobylański (Polish pronunciation: [ˈandʐɛj kɔbɨˈlaj̃skʲi]) born 31 July 1970) is a Polish former professional footballer who played as a striker or midfielder. In 2012, he was the assistant manager for Cracovia, and held the role of sporting director for Korona Kielce from 2013 to mid-2014.

Kobylański's father, Alfred Kobylański and his son, Martin Kobylański, have both been professional footballers.

== Career ==
He represented his native country at the 1992 Summer Olympics in Barcelona. The Polish team won the silver medal.

== Honours ==
Poland Olympic

- Olympic silver medal: 1992
