= Michael Müller (footballer, born 1964) =

German footballer

Personal information
- Date of birth: 4 April 1964 (age 62)
- Place of birth: Mainz, West Germany
- Height: 1.79 m (5 ft 10 in)
- Position: Sweeper

Senior career*
Years	Team	Apps	(Gls)
1985–1996	Mainz 05	206	(19)
1996–1998	SV Wehen		
Total		206+	(19+)
- * Club domestic league appearances and goals

Michael Müller (born 4 April 1964) is a German former footballer who played as a sweeper.
