= Dirk Muschiol =

German footballer

Personal information
- Full name: Dirk Muschiol
- Date of birth: 13 April 1969 (age 57)
- Place of birth: Germany
- Height: 1.80 m (5 ft 11 in)
- Position: Defender

Senior career*
Years	Team	Apps	(Gls)
1990–1992	Blau-Weiß Berlin	28	(0)
1993–1994	Tennis Borussia Berlin	27	(2)
1995–1997	Reinickendorfer Füchse		
Total		55	(2)
- * Club domestic league appearances and goals

Dirk Muschiol (born 13 April 1969) is a former professional German footballer.

Muschiol made 55 appearances in the 2. Bundesliga for SpVgg Blau-Weiß 1890 Berlin and Tennis Borussia Berlin during his playing career.
