= Egon Flad =

German footballer

Personal information
- Full name: Egon Flad
- Date of birth: 5 March 1964 (age 62)
- Place of birth: West Germany
- Height: 1.79 m (5 ft 10 in)
- Position: Midfielder

Youth career
- –1983: VfB Stuttgart

Senior career*
Years	Team	Apps	(Gls)
1983–1984	Stuttgarter Kickers	25	(2)
1984–1988	SpVgg Blau-Weiß 1890 Berlin	127	(12)
1988–1989	FC St. Pauli	45	(4)
1990–1992	Schalke 04	74	(6)
1993–1994	Tennis Borussia Berlin	23	(1)
Total		294	(25)
- * Club domestic league appearances and goals

Egon Flad (born 5 March 1964) is a German former professional footballer who played as a midfielder. After his professional career, he became active as a sports agent.
