= Tekin Sazlog =

Turkish footballer (born 1976)

Personal information
- Date of birth: 21 March 1976 (age 50)
- Place of birth: Berlin, West Germany
- Height: 1.69 m (5 ft 7 in)
- Position: Striker

Youth career
- FC Stern Marienfelde
- Hertha Zehlendorf

Senior career*
Years	Team	Apps	(Gls)
1993–1994	Tennis Borussia Berlin	10	(0)
1994–1996	FSV Optik Rathenow		
1996–2002	FC Oberneuland		
2002–2003	Rotenburger SV		
2003	KSV Vatan Spor		
2004	Rotenburger SV		
2004–2005	FC Oberneuland		
2005–2008	SG Aumund-Vegesack	7	(5)

International career
1991	Turkey U15	5	(1)
1990–1992	Turkey U16	11	(4)
1992	Turkey U17	3	(0)
1990–1993	Turkey U18	22	(7)
1993	Turkey U20	3	(0)
- * Club domestic league appearances and goals

Tekin Sazlog (born 21 March 1976 in Berlin, West Germany) is a Turkish former professional footballer who played as a striker.

Sazlog made ten appearances in the 2. Bundesliga for Tennis Borussia Berlin during his playing career and represented the Turkey national youth team at various levels.
