= Gerald Hillringhaus =

German footballer (born 1962)

Gerry Hillringhaus
Personal information
- Full name: Gerald Hillringhaus
- Date of birth: 22 June 1962 (age 64)
- Place of birth: Munich, West Germany
- Height: 1.88 m (6 ft 2 in)
- Position: Goalkeeper

Youth career
- 1972–1980: TSV Gilching

Senior career*
Years	Team	Apps	(Gls)
1980–1985	TSV 1860 München	96	(0)
1985–1986	SpVgg Bayreuth	22	(0)
1986–	1. FC Kaiserslautern		(0)
–1990	SV Türk Gücü München		(1)
1990–1992	FC Bayern München	17	(0)
1992–1993	FC Schalke 04	0	(0)
1993–1995	Tennis Borussia Berlin	48	(0)
- * Club domestic league appearances and goals

Gerald "Gerry" Hillringhaus (born 22 June 1962 in Munich) is a former German footballer.

Hillringhaus made 17 appearances for FC Bayern München during the 1991–92 Bundesliga campaign.

Hillringhaus also scored September 1989's Tor des Monats (English: goal of the month) for SV Türk Gücü München.
