= Bernd Winter =

German footballer

Personal information
- Date of birth: 24 July 1971 (age 55)
- Place of birth: Groß-Umstadt
- Height: 1.82 m (6 ft 0 in)
- Position: Midfielder

Senior career*
Years	Team	Apps	(Gls)
1989–1992	Viktoria Aschaffenburg		
1992–1993	Fortuna Düsseldorf		
1993–1994	VfL Wolfsburg		
1994–1998	SV Meppen		
1999–2003	SC Preußen Münster		
2003–2004	1. FC Schweinfurt 05		
2005–2008	FSV Frankfurt		

Managerial career
- 2015–2016: FSV Frankfurt (assistant)
- 2016: Karlsruher SC (assistant)
- * Club domestic league appearances and goals

Bernd Winter (born 24 July 1971) is a retired German football midfielder.
