= Jens Henschel =

German footballer (born 1964)

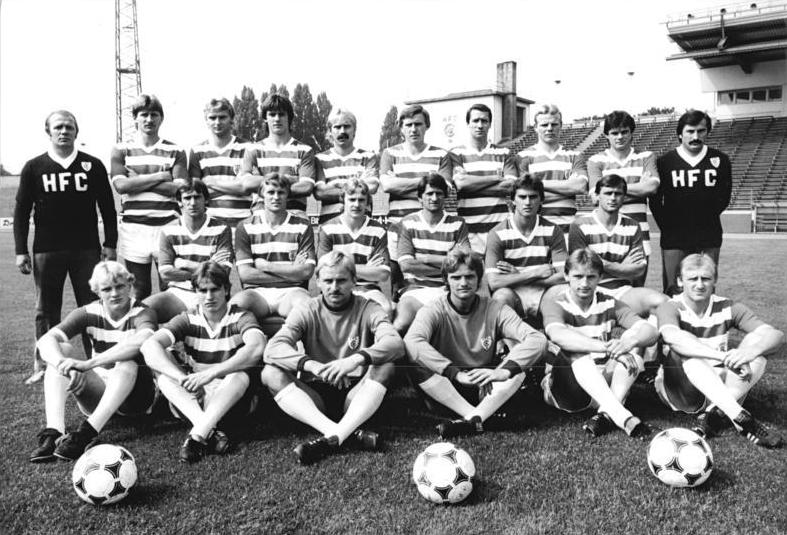
- Hallescher FC Chemie team in 1983; Henschel is in middle row, 3rd from left

Personal information
- Full name: Jens Henschel
- Date of birth: 18 September 1964 (age 62)
- Place of birth: Zeitz, Bezirk Halle, East Germany
- Position: Striker

Youth career
- –1981: BSG Chemie Zeitz
- 1981–1986: Hallescher FC Chemie

Senior career*
| Years | Team | Apps | (Gls) |
| 1986–1987 | Hallescher FC Chemie | 17 | (7) |
| 1987–1991 | FC Vorwärts Frankfurt/O. | 33 | (22) |
| 1991–1993 | Union Berlin | 67 | (26) |
| 1993 | Tennis Borussia Berlin | 12 | (0) |
| 1994 | FC Berlin | 12 | (7) |
| 1994-1996 | Tennis Borussia Berlin | | (0) |
| 1997–1998 | SV Babelsberg 03 | | |
| 1998–2000 | MSV Neuruppin | | |
| 2000–2004 | SV Falkensee-Finkenkrug | 30 | (5) |
| 2004–2005 | SG Blau-Weiß Pessin | | |
- * Club domestic league appearances and goals

Jens Henschel (born 18 September 1964, in Zeitz) is a German former professional footballer who played as a striker.

Henschel made 50 appearances in the DDR-Liga and 12 appearances in the 2. Fußball-Bundesliga during his playing career.
