= Antoine Hey =

German footballer and manager

Personal information
- Full name: Antoine Hey
- Date of birth: 19 September 1970 (age 56)
- Place of birth: West Berlin, West Germany
- Height: 1.80 m (5 ft 11 in)
- Position: Midfielder

Senior career*
Years	Team	Apps	(Gls)
–1989	Grasshoppers		
1989–1992	Fortuna Düsseldorf	49	(5)
1992–1994	Schalke 04	19	(0)
1993–1994	→ Tennis Borussia Berlin (loan)	27	(7)
1994–1997	SC Fortuna Köln	94	(16)
1997–1999	Birmingham City	9	(0)
1999–2000	Fortuna Düsseldorf	34	(3)
2000–2001	VfL Osnabrück	33	(0)
2001–2003	Anorthosis Famagusta	20	(6)
2003	Bristol City	0	(0)
2003–2004	VfR Neumünster	22	(1)

Managerial career
- 2003–2004: VfR Neumünster
- 2004–2006: Lesotho
- 2006–2007: Gambia
- 2007: US Monastir
- 2008–2009: Liberia
- 2009: Kenya
- 2016–2017: Al-Merrikh
- 2017–2018: Rwanda
- 2018: Myanmar
- 2018: Myanmar U23
- 2019–2023: Myanmar
- 2025: ES Sétif
- * Club domestic league appearances and goals

Antoine Hey (born 19 September 1970) is a German football coach and former professional player.

He spent most of his playing career in the top two divisions of German football, and went on to manage a number of national teams.

== Playing career ==
Hey played mainly for Fortuna Düsseldorf and Schalke 04 in Germany, as well as Tennis Borussia Berlin, Fortuna Köln, VfL Osnabrück, Anorthosis Famagusta and VfR Neumünster.

== Managerial career ==
Hey began his management career in Germany with VfR Neumünster before moving to Africa to manage Lesotho. Hey was also manager of the Gambia from September 2006 until March 2007. His spell with Gambia was marred by concerns over money. He was appointed manager of Liberia in February 2008. In February 2009, he was appointed coach of the Kenyan national team. After disputes with the governing body over team selection, Hey walked out on Kenya's national team shortly before the final World Cup qualifier against Nigeria.

Later on, he worked as a Technical Director for the Libyan Football Federation from 2010 until 2014, and in the same role for the Bahrain Football Association from 2015 until 2016. In November 2016, Hey returned to management with Sudanese club Al-Merrikh, but he was sacked in January 2017 due to poor results, directly after the draw with ASAS Djibouti Télécom in the 2017 UAFA Club Championship.

In February 2017 he was one of a number of managers on the shortlist for the vacant Rwanda national team manager role. He was appointed manager of the Rwanda national team in March 2017. He asked to quit in January 2018.

In May 2018, he was appointed in a dual role as manager of Myanmar and its under-23 team on a one-and-a-half-year deal. In the 2018 AFF Championship, Myanmar drew with Vietnam under controversial circumstances. Hey was criticized for his aggressive behaviour in this match towards the Vietnamese players and their manager Park Hang-seo. He was sacked in December 2018. He returned to Myanmar in October 2019.

In July 2025, he was appointed manager of Tunisian club ES Sétif. On 2 October 2025, he was sacked after only six games due to bad results.

== Personal life ==
His father, Jonny Hey, was also a professional footballer, playing for MSV Duisburg, Arminia Bielefeld, Grasshoppers Zürich and Fortuna Köln between 1972 and 1980.
