= Andreas Keim =

German footballer

Personal information
- Full name: Andreas Keim
- Date of birth: 8 June 1962 (age 64)
- Place of birth: Karlsruhe, West Germany
- Height: 1.87 m (6 ft 2 in)
- Position: Defender

Youth career
- Post-SV Karlsruhe

Senior career*
Years	Team	Apps	(Gls)
1984–1985	Karlsruher SC	32	(6)
1985–1987	Fortuna Düsseldorf	48	(6)
1987–1988	FC Homburg	33	(2)
1988	1. FC Köln	7	(0)
1989–1993	Stuttgarter Kickers	134	(13)
1993–1994	Tennis Borussia Berlin	28	(2)
- * Club domestic league appearances and goals

Andreas Keim (born 8 June 1962) is a retired German football player.

== Honours ==
- Fußball-Bundesliga runner-up: 1988–89
