= Uwe Jahn (football manager) =

German football manager

Personal information
- Full name: Uwe Jahn
- Date of birth: 29 September 1954 (age 72)
- Place of birth: Berlin, Germany

Managerial career
- Years: Team
- 1994: Tennis Borussia Berlin
- 1994–1995: Tennis Borussia Berlin

Uwe Jahn (born 29 September 1954 in Berlin) is a German football coach.

During the mid-1990s, Jahn had two spells as manager of Tennis Borussia Berlin, but couldn't stop them from being relegated from the 1993–94 2. Fußball-Bundesliga.

Since April 1996, Jahn has been a coach (German: "Verbandssportlehrer") for the Hamburg Football Association.
