= Thomas Miller (footballer, born 1963) =

German footballer

Personal information
- Full name: Thomas Miller
- Date of birth: 13 February 1963 (age 63)
- Place of birth: Fürstenfeldbruck, West Germany
- Height: 1.80 m (5 ft 11 in)
- Position: Defender

Senior career*
Years	Team	Apps	(Gls)
–1983	SC Fürstenfeldbruck		
1983–1985	SpVgg Unterhaching		
1985–1989	FC Augsburg		
1989–1997	1860 Munich	213	(5)
- * Club domestic league appearances and goals

Thomas Miller (born 13 February 1963) is a German former professional footballer who played as a defender.

== Career ==
Miller made 82 appearances for TSV 1860 Munich in the Bundesliga during his playing career.
