= Jan Wehrmann =

German footballer

Personal information
- Date of birth: 30 December 1969 (age 56)
- Place of birth: East Germany
- Height: 1.82 m (6 ft 0 in)
- Position: Midfielder

Youth career
- SG Bergmann-Borsig

Senior career*
Years	Team	Apps	(Gls)
1993–1994	Tennis Borussia Berlin	32	(0)
1994–2000	Rot-Weiß Erfurt	34	(2)
2000–2004	SSV Erfurt Nord		
2004–2005	BSV Eintracht Sondershausen	30	(2)
2005–2006	FSV Wacker 03 Gotha		
2006–2009	Weißenseer FC		
- * Club domestic league appearances and goals

Jan Wehrmann (born 30 December 1969) is a German former professional footballer who played as a midfielder. He made a total of 32 appearances in the 2. Bundesliga for Tennis Borussia Berlin during his playing career.
