= Thomas Vogel (footballer, born 1965) =

German footballer and coach

Personal information
- Full name: Thomas Vogel
- Date of birth: 28 June 1965 (age 61)
- Place of birth: Weimar, East Germany
- Height: 1.87 m (6 ft 2 in)
- Position: Forward

Team information
- Current team: Carl Zeiss Jena (advisor)

Youth career
- BSG Traktor Mellingen
- –1984: BSG Motor Weimar

Senior career*
| Years | Team | Apps | (Gls) |
| 1984–1988 | BSG Robotron Sömmerda | | |
| 1988–1991 | Rot-Weiß Erfurt | 62 | (9) |
| 1991–1992 | 1. FC Kaiserslautern | 36 | (6) |
| 1993–1994 | Tennis Borussia Berlin | 18 | (3) |
| 1994–1996 | Carl Zeiss Jena | 42 | (11) |

Managerial career
- 1999: Carl Zeiss Jena
- 2002–2003: Carl Zeiss Jena
- 2004: Carl Zeiss Jena
- 2004–2009: FC Elmshorn 1920 (athletic director)
- 2009–: Carl Zeiss Jena (advisor)
- * Club domestic league appearances and goals

Thomas Vogel (born 28 June 1965, in Weimar) is a German former professional footballer who played as a forward. He later worked as a coach and as a presidential advisor at Carl Zeiss Jena.
