= René Unglaube =

German footballer

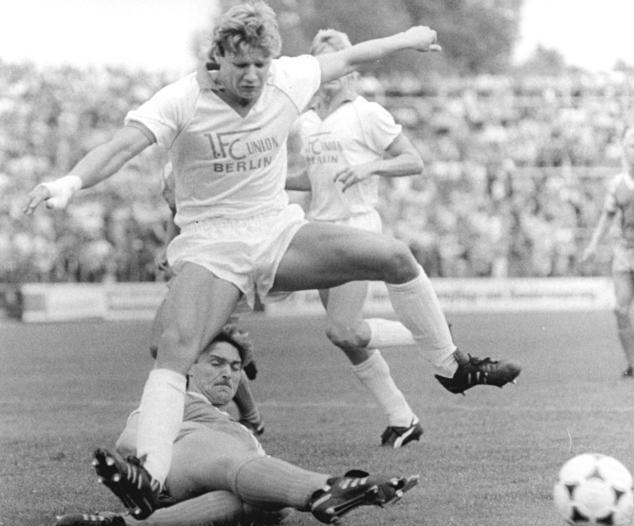
- Unglaube (on top) playing for 1. FC Union Berlin in 1988

Personal information
- Full name: René Unglaube
- Date of birth: 6 November 1965 (age 60)
- Place of birth: East Berlin, East Germany
- Height: 1.83 m (6 ft 0 in)
- Position: Striker

Youth career
- –1974: BSG Motor Köpenick
- 1974–1985: 1. FC Union Berlin

Senior career*
Years	Team	Apps	(Gls)
1985–1988	1. FC Union Berlin	74	(10)
1988–1989	FC Vorwärts Frankfurt	21	(1)
1989–1991	Hertha BSC	25	(5)
1991–1992	SG Wattenscheid 09	14	(1)
1992–1994	Tennis Borussia Berlin	20	(4)
1995	SC Gatow		
Total		154	(21)

International career
	East Germany U-21	14	(2)
- * Club domestic league appearances and goals

René Unglaube (born 6 November 1965 in East Berlin) is a former professional German footballer.

Unglaube made a total of 34 appearances in the Fußball-Bundesliga during his playing career.
