= Davor Krznarić =

Croatian former footballer (born 1975)

Personal information
- Full name: Davor Krznarić
- Date of birth: 22 August 1975 (age 51)
- Place of birth: Berlin, Germany
- Height: 1.76 m (5 ft 9 in)
- Position: Midfielder

Senior career*
Years	Team	Apps	(Gls)
1994-1995	Tennis Borussia Berlin	1	(1)
1995-1997	Borussia Mönchengladbach	2	(0)
1997–1997	Borussia Mönchengladbach II		
1997–1999	BFC Dynamo		
1999–2000	SV Babelsberg 03		
2000–2002	VfB Leipzig		
2002	Tennis Borussia Berlin	0	(0)
2003–2006	SV Tasmania-Gropiusstadt 1973		
2007	BFC Dynamo	6	(0)

International career
1996	Croatia U21	3	(0)
- * Club domestic league appearances and goals

Davor Krznarić (born 22 August 1975) is a Croatian former footballer who played as a midfielder.

== Club career ==
At the end of the 1995–96 season, Krznarić made two substitute appearances for Borussia Mönchengladbach in the Bundesliga.

== International career ==
Krznarić made three appearances for the Croatia national under-21 football team.
