= Carsten Linke =

German footballer

Personal information
- Date of birth: 19 September 1965 (age 61)
- Place of birth: Bad Zwischenahn, West Germany
- Height: 1.89 m (6 ft 2 in)
- Positions: Defender; midfielder

Youth career
- –1988: VfL Bad Zwischenahn

Senior career*
Years	Team	Apps	(Gls)
1988–1993	VfB Oldenburg	109	(26)
1993–1995	FC Homburg	68	(11)
1995–2003	Hannover 96	214	(22)
Total		395	(59)

Managerial career
- 2008–2009: Carl Zeiss Jena (athletic director)
- * Club domestic league appearances and goals

Carsten Linke (born 19 September 1965 in Bad Zwischenahn, Lower Saxony) is a German former professional football player. He spent one season in the Bundesliga with Hannover 96.

== Career ==
During the 1990s, Linke played in the 2. Bundesliga for clubs VfB Oldenburg and FC 08 Homburg. After Homburg was relegated to the Regionalliga West/Südwest, he moved to 1. FC Saarbrücken in 1995, which had also been relegated due to license withdrawal. After just six months he switched to Hannover 96 in the 2. Bundesliga in the winter, where he rose to become a role model. In 1998, after relegation (1996), he and the team managed to get promoted from the regional league to the 2nd Bundesliga and in 2002 to the 1. Bundesliga. There he played his first Bundesliga game at the age of 36. During his playing days, in which he played 215 games for the Reds, Linke was the favourite of the Hanoverians. He is still called the football god by fans today.

Overall, Linke completed 313 games in the second division, in which he scored 47 goals. In the last season of his professional career, he made 15 appearances and scored one goal in the Bundesliga.

From 21 February 2008, Linke held the position of sports director at FC Carl Zeiss Jena. On 23 March 2009, he was relieved of his duties as sports director. He continued to work as managing director of FC Carl Zeiss Jena Spielbetriebs GmbH until the end of his contract in June 2009.

At the general meeting on 23 March 2019, Linke was elected to the supervisory board of Hannover 96.
