= Adriano (footballer, born 25 September 1974) =

Brazilian footballer

Personal information
- Full name: Adriano José da Silva
- Date of birth: 25 September 1974 (age 52)
- Position: Forward

Senior career*
Years	Team	Apps	(Gls)
1993–1996	FC Homburg		
1997	1. FC Saarbrücken		
1998–1999	Rot-Weiß Oberhausen	7	(2)
1999–2000	SC Verl		
2000–2001	Karlsruher SC	2	(0)
- * Club domestic league appearances and goals

Adriano José da Silva (born 25 September 1974), known as Adriano, is a Brazilian former professional footballer who played as a forward.
