= Theo Gries =

German footballer and manager

Personal information
- Full name: Theo Gries
- Date of birth: 10 February 1961 (age 65)
- Place of birth: Mittelbrunn, West Germany
- Height: 1.83 m (6 ft 0 in)
- Positions: Midfielder; striker

Team information
- Current team: 1. FC Union Berlin II (manager)

Senior career*
Years	Team	Apps	(Gls)
1983–1985	1. FC Kaiserslautern	1	(0)
1985–1988	Alemannia Aachen	125	(47)
1988–1993	Hertha BSC	176	(74)
1993–1994	Hannover 96	20	(8)
Total		322	(129)

Managerial career
- 2003–2005: Tennis Borussia Berlin
- 2007–: 1. FC Union Berlin II
- * Club domestic league appearances and goals

Theo Gries (born 10 February 1961 in Mittelbrunn) is a German football manager and retired player who is currently coaching 1. FC Union Berlin II. Gries scored 123 goals in the 2. Bundesliga, making him before the start of the 2012-13 second division season the third-best marksman in the history of this league.
