= TuS Makkabi Berlin =

German sports club

- Full name: TuS Makkabi Berlin e.V.
- Founded: 26 November 1970; 55 years ago
- Ground: Julius-Hirsch-Sportanlage
- Capacity: 1,000
- Chairman: Linir Mizrahi
- Manager: Wolfgang Sandhowe
- League: Oberliga NOFV-Nord (V)
- 2025–26: Oberliga NOFV-Nord, 8th of 16
- Website: tus-makkabi.de
Home colours	Away colours

TuS Makkabi Berlin is a German sports club based in Berlin. Established in 1970, the club lays claim to the traditions of predecessor Bar-Kochba Berlin.

== History ==
Created in 1898, predecessor club Bar Kochba Berlin was one of the largest Jewish organizations in the world by 1930 with over 40,000 members from 24 countries, part of the general Bar Kochba movement intended to promote physical education and Jewish heritage. The club fielded teams in several sports including a football side which competed in the city leagues between 1911 and 1929. In 1924, Lilli Henoch, the world record holder in the discus, shot put, and 4 × 100 meters relay events, trained the women's section in the club.

Logo of predecessor side Hakoah Berlin

In 1929 Bar Kochba merged with Hakoah Berlin to form the sports club Bar Kochba-Hakoah. The Hakoah side had enjoyed increasing success, capturing three consecutive lower division championships between 1925 and 1927. They were promoted each time until, by 1928, they were playing first tier football. The newly combined side continued to compete as Hakoah after 1929.

The rise to power of the Nazis in the early 1930s led to discrimination against Jews and by 1933 Jewish teams were excluded from general competition and limited to play in separate leagues or tournaments. In 1938 Jewish teams were banned outright as discrimination turned to persecution.

=== Foundation ===
Historical logo of Makkabi Berlin

In the aftermath of World War II Jewish sports and cultural associations eventually re-emerged in Germany. On 26 November 1970 TuS Makkabi Berlin was formed out of the merger of Bar-Kochba Berlin (gymnastics and athletics), Hakoah Berlin (football, re-established 1945) and Makkabi Berlin (boxing). The football side of the club played in third and fourth tier competition in the 1970s and 1980s before leaving to join FV Wannsee in 1987. Wannsee also played as a third and fourth division side until collapsing in the mid-90s and slipping first to the Landesliga Berlin-2 (VI) and then to the Bezirksliga Berlin (VII) by the end of the decade.

Makkabi's footballers returned to the fold in 1997 and since 2003 have also played in the Bezirksliga Berlin. In 2006, the club gained promotion to the Verbandsliga Berlin (VI) and has since fluctuated between this league and the Landesliga below, once more returning to the Berlin-Liga in 2016. In 2022, Makkabi won promotion to the NOFV-Oberliga Nord after winning the Berlin-Liga.

== Organization ==
Today the sports club has some 600 members and is one of the largest Maccabi associations in the country. The club strongly promotes dialogue between Jews and non-Jews in a sports context.

== Honours ==
- Berlin Cup
  - Runners up: 2023

== Incidents ==
In October 2006 during Makkabi's match versus the second team squad of VSG Altglienicke in Berlin's Kreisliga-B, fans and players were reported to have chanted "Gas the Jews", "Auschwitz is back" and "Führer, Führer" as well as other slogans. The case drew extensive media coverage in Germany as well as Israel.

== See also ==
- Football in Berlin
