= Jörg Kirsten =

German footballer

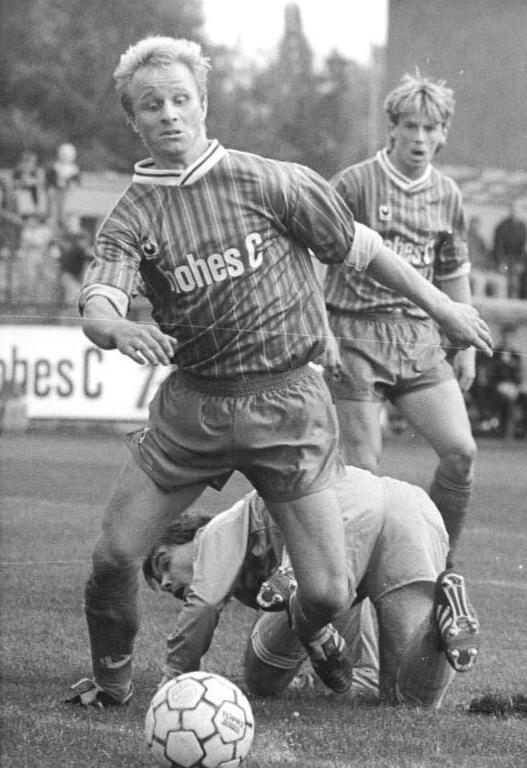
- Jörg Kirsten (in the background, on the right) playing for Sachsen Leipzig with teammate Dieter Kühn (middle) in 1990

Personal information
- Date of birth: 18 October 1967 (age 59)
- Place of birth: Leipzig, East Germany
- Height: 1.77 m (5 ft 9 1/2 in)
- Position: Striker

Senior career*
Years	Team	Apps	(Gls)
1985–1988	Chemie Leipzig		
1988–1990	Chemie Böhlen		
1990–1991	Sachsen Leipzig	21	(1)
1991–1992	Wismut Aue		
1992–1995	Waldhof Mannheim	100	(37)
1995–1997	FSV Zwickau	61	(23)
1997–1998	LR Ahlen	19	(3)
1998–1999	Waldhof Mannheim	26	(12)
1999–2001	Erzgebirge Aue	54	(17)
- * Club domestic league appearances and goals

Jörg Kirsten (born 18 October 1967) is a German former footballer.
