= Torsten Wruck =

German footballer

Personal information
- Date of birth: 22 July 1969 (age 57)
- Place of birth: Berlin
- Height: 1.85 m (6 ft 1 in)
- Position: Defender

Senior career*
Years	Team	Apps	(Gls)
1987–1988	FC Vorwärts Frankfurt/Oder II		
1988–1990	FC Vorwärts Frankfurt/Oder		
1990–1991	1. FC Union Berlin		
1991–1992	1. FC Köln Amateure		
1992–1998	FC 08 Homburg		
1998–2000	1. FC Saarbrücken		
- * Club domestic league appearances and goals

Torsten Wruck (born 22 July 1969) is a retired German football defender.

== Club career ==
In the German second division he played 92 matches for FC 08 Homburg in the mid 1990s.
