= Olaf Bodden =

German footballer

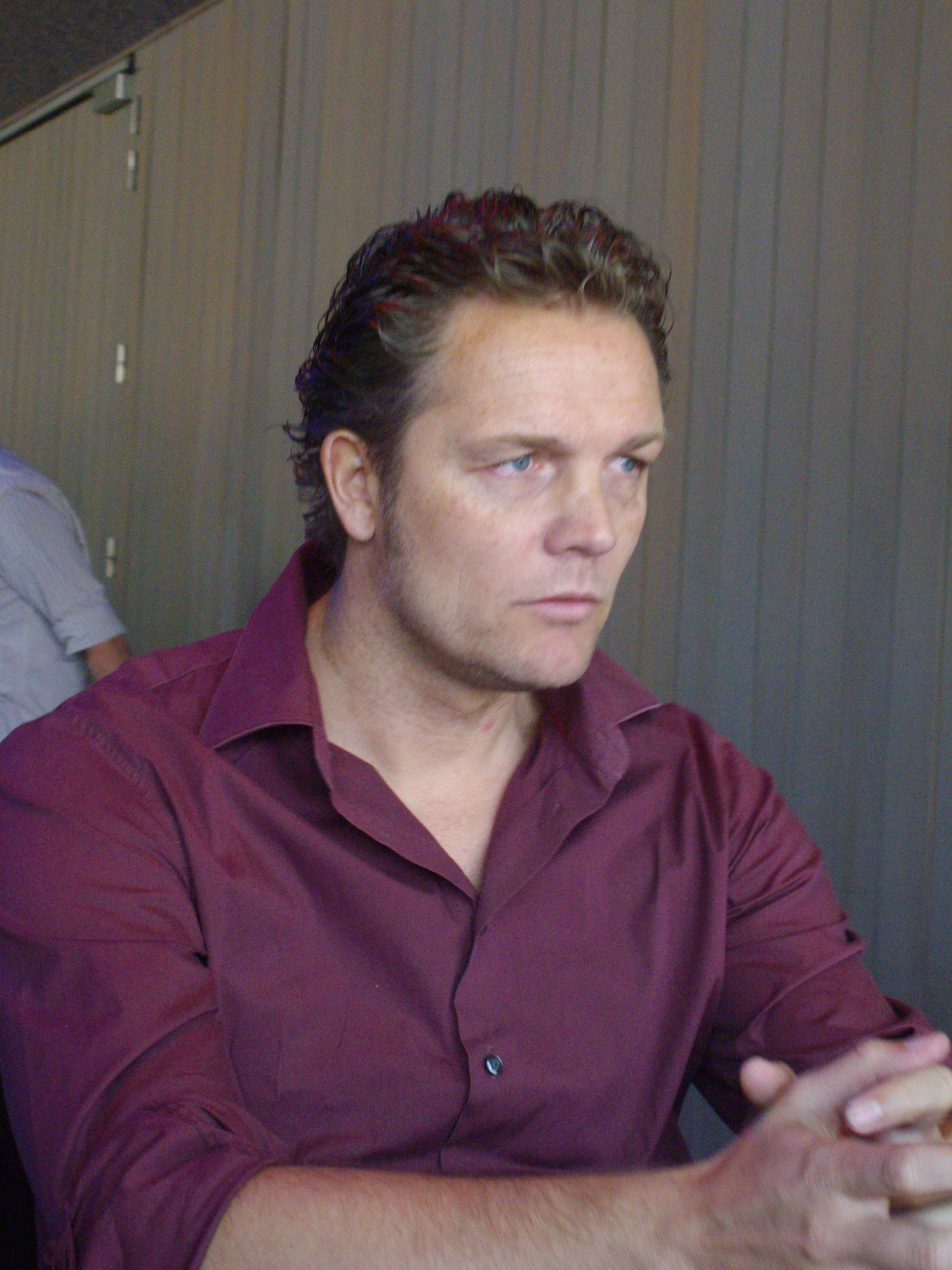
- Bodden in 2008

Personal information
- Date of birth: 4 May 1968 (age 58)
- Place of birth: Kalkar, West Germany
- Height: 1.92 m (6 ft 4 in)
- Position: Striker

Senior career*
| Years | Team | Apps | (Gls) |
| 1989–1991 | Borussia Mönchengladbach | 3 | (0) |
| 1991–1992 | Hansa Rostock | 22 | (2) |
| 1992–1994 | Hansa Rostock | 83 | (24) |
| 1994–1998 | 1860 Munich | 67 | (25) |
| Total | | 175 | (51) |
- * Club domestic league appearances and goals

Olaf Bodden (born 4 May 1968) is a German former professional footballer who played as a striker.

== Career ==
Bodden was born in Kalkar, West Germany. He had to end his active career in 1997 after he got Infectious mononucleosis and then Chronic fatigue syndrome (CFS). With the TSV 1860 Munich he scored 25 goals in 67 matches and is presently the record goal scorer of Hansa Rostock in the 2. Bundesliga.

"Der müde Stürmer" is the title of a German documentary on Bodden's fight against the chronic fatigue syndrome.
