= SV Yeşilyurt =

German football club

- Full name: Sportverein Yeşilyurt Berlin e. V.
- Founded: 1973
- Dissolved: 2007
- Ground: Hanne-Sobek-Sportanlage
- Capacity: 3,000
- League: defunct
Home colours	Away colours

SV Yeşilyurt was a German football club from the district of Wedding in Berlin.

== History ==
The club has its origins in an ethnically-Turkish recreational football club formed in 1973. Less than ten years later the association registered with Berlin's football federation and began a climb that would see them rival Türkiyemspor Berlin as the city's most prominent side within the Turkish community.

The club spent the 1990s moving up and down between the Bezirksliga Berlin (VII) and the Landesliga Berlin (VI) before being promoted on the strength of a 2001 Landesliga championship to the Verbandsliga Berlin (V). Two seasons later they claimed the title there and advanced to the NOFV-Oberliga Nord (IV).

Yeşilyurt enjoyed its most successful season to date in 2001 when they captured the Atatürk Cup in a tournament staged for Turkish clubs in Germany and then emerged as the winners of the Berliner Pokal cup competition, known at the time as the Paul Rusch Cup. Their Rusch Cup victory put them through to the opening round of the DFB-Pokal where they went out 4–2 to then Bundesliga side SC Freiburg.

On 16 November 2007, the club withdrew from the Oberliga due to financial problems and entered in merger discussions with Berlin AK 07. However, their potential partner also had financial problems and a full merger never took place. Yesilyurt's board was elected to the board of BAK with the intent that the club's membership would follow. Instead the members left to form a new club SK Yesilyurt 07. This new side began play in 2008-09 in the Kreisliga C, Staffel 4 (XI), the lowest tier in the Berlin league system, where they finished in eighth place.

The new side merged with BSC Türk Genclik 2001 in June 2010 to form SK Türkyurt 2001 which then played its way from the Kreisliga (XI) to the Landesliga (VII) by 2016.

== Honours ==
The club's honours:

- Bezirksliga Berlin (VII)
  - Champions: 1999
- Landesliga Berlin (VI)
  - Champions: 2001
- Verbandsliga Berlin (V)
  - Champions: 2003
- Berliner Landespokal
  - Winners: 2001
  - Runners-up: 2004

== Team trivia ==
- The name Yeşilyurt – meaning "green homeland" – was chosen for city districts of the same name in İzmir and Istanbul, Turkey where many of the club's original members came from.
