= FC Carl Zeiss Jena =

German association football club from Jena, Thuringia

Carl Zeiss Jena
- Full name: Fußballclub Carl Zeiss Jena e.V.
- Nickname: FCC
- Founded: 13 May 1903; 123 years ago
- Ground: ad hoc arena im Ernst-Abbe-Sportfeld
- Capacity: 15,432
- President: Ralph Grillitsch
- Head coach: Marco Grote
- League: Regionalliga Nordost (IV)
- 2025–26: Regionalliga Nordost, 2nd of 18
- Website: www.fc-carlzeiss-jena.de
Home colours	Away colours

Fußballclub Carl Zeiss Jena e. V. ([kaʁl ˈtsaɪs ˈjeːna]) is a German football club based in Jena, Thuringia. Founded in 1903, it was initially associated with the optics manufacturer Carl Zeiss. From the 1960s to the 1980s, it was one of the top-ranked clubs in East Germany, won the DDR-Oberliga and the FDGB-Pokal three times each and reached the 1981 European Cup Winners' Cup Final. Since the German reunification in 1990, the club has competed no higher than the second tier. Since the 2021–22 season, Jena is playing in the Regionalliga Nordost.

== History ==
The club was founded in May 1903 by workers at the Carl Zeiss AG optics factory as the company-sponsored Fussball-Club der Firma Carl Zeiss. The club underwent name changes in 1911 to Fussball Club Carl Zeiss Jena e.V. and in March 1917 to 1. Sportverein Jena e.V.

=== The 1930s and World War II ===
In 1933, 1. SV Jena joined the Gauliga Mitte, one of 16 top-flight divisions formed in the reorganization of German football under the Third Reich. The team captured division titles in 1935, 1936, 1940, and 1941. This earned Jena entry to the national finals, but they performed poorly and were never able to advance out of preliminary-round group play. After the 1943–44 season, the Gauliga Mitte broke up into a collection of city-based leagues as World War II overtook the area.

=== Postwar in East Germany ===
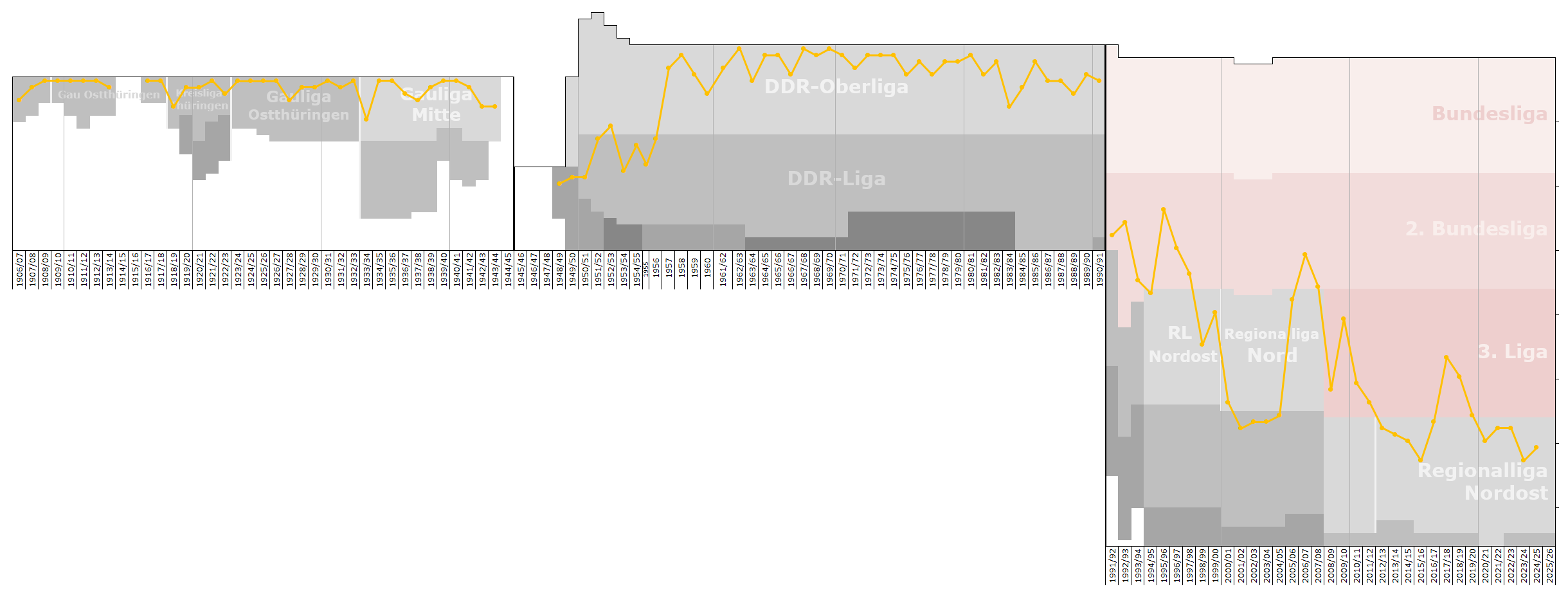
Historical chart of Carl Zeiss Jena league performance

In the immediate aftermath of the war, associations of all types (including sports and football clubs) were banned in Germany by the occupying Allied authorities. Jena was reconstituted in June 1946 as SG Ernst Abbe Jena and, like many other clubs in East Germany, underwent a number of name changes: SG Stadion Jena (October 1948), SG Carl Zeiss Jena (March 1949), BSG Mechanik Jena (January 1951), BSG Motor Jena (May 1951) and SC Motor Jena (November 1954).

In the aftermath of World War II, East Germany authorities tagged sports teams with the names of socialist heroes: Ernst Abbe was a local son and physicist associated with the Zeiss optical factory. He made an early contribution to easing the plight of workers by introducing the 8-hour work day at the Zeiss plant, a milestone for labour during the late 19th century.

In 1950, the club became a founding member of the DDR Liga (II), and in their second season captured a divisional title to win promotion to the top-flight DDR Oberliga for a single-season appearance. Renamed SC Motor Jena in 1954, they played their way back to the upper league by 1957. Jena won its first honours with the capture of the FDGB-Pokal in 1960 and followed up with the East Germany national title in 1963. The club was "re-founded" as FC Carl Zeiss Jena in January 1966, and became one of East Germany's "focus centres" for the development of players for the national side and a dominant side in the DDR-Oberliga. They took two more national titles in 1968 and 1970, but finished in second place another half-dozen times to sides such as Vorwärts Berlin, Dynamo Dresden and 1. FC Magdeburg. They also captured East German Cups in 1972, 1974, and 1980, and appeared in the 1981 European Cup Winners' Cup Final, losing 2–1 to Dinamo Tbilisi.

=== German reunification ===
After German reunification in 1990, Jena entered the 2. Bundesliga. Their second-place finish in 1992 deteriorated into a 17th-place finish in 1994 and relegation to Regionalliga Nordost (III). They won immediate promotion, and played for three more years at tier-II level. Since 1999, the team has primarily played tier III and IV football, but a second place-finish in the Regionalliga Nord secured Jena promotion to the 2. Bundesliga for the 2006–07 season. Jena remained in the 2. Bundesliga by winning 2–1 away against FC Augsburg in their final match of the season. They finished last in the 2. Bundesliga in 2007–08, returning to the third tier. However, this would not be one of the Regionalligen; the German Football Association (DFB) launched the new 3. Liga for 2008–09, of which Jena was a charter member.

On 9 November 2009, chairman Peter Schreiber announced his retirement; on 13 November, the executive board accepted his resignation, and on 25 November Hartmut Bayer became the new chairman. The second team was involved in the 2009 European football betting scandal, accused of match-fixing in the game against ZFC Meuselwitz. On 10 December 2009, the club announced that it was in financial distress, owing over €1 million. In January 2010, the players agreed to accept a lower salary.

Carl Zeiss Jena were relegated from the 3. Liga in 2012 and finished second in the tier four Regionalliga Nordost in 2013, and third in 2014. In the 2016–17 season, they won the Regionalliga Nordost and were promoted to 3. Liga after a play-off win against Viktoria Köln. CZ Jena won the first match in Köln 3–2 and lost the second leg 1–0 at home, but were promoted on the away goals rule. After three seasons in the 3. Liga, the club experienced an underwhelming season and was relegated to the Regionalliga Nordost in June 2020.

== Supporters ==
Carl Zeiss Jena supporters have a friendship with the Welsh side Newport County, after the two sides played against each other in the European Cup Winners' Cup in the early 1980s. As with Carl Zeiss Jena, Newport County have seen similar struggles off and on the pitch, and the teams regularly play each other during pre-season.

The club compete in a Thuringia derby with Rot-Weiß Erfurt, which often features violence between the two sets of supporters and use of pyrotechnics. The rivalry is exacerbated by a mutual antipathy between the cities of Jena and Erfurt.

== Honours ==
=== League ===
Top tier

- DDR-Oberliga (East German Championship)
  - Winners: 1963, 1968, 1970
  - Runner-up: 1958, 1965, 1966, 1969, 1971, 1973, 1974, 1975, 1981
  - Third placed: 1977, 1979, 1980, 1983, 1986

Lower tiers

- Regionalliga Nordost (Note: The Regionalliga Nordost was the third tier of the German football league system in the states of the former East Germany and West Berlin.)
  - Winners: 1995, (Note: Promoted to Regionalliga Süd) 2017
- Regionalliga Nord (Note: Regionalliga Nord was then the third tier of German football; it is now the fourth tier.)
  - Runner-up: 2006 (Note: Promoted to 2. Fußball-Bundesliga)
- NOFV-Oberliga Süd (Note: NOFV-Oberliga Süd was then the fourth tier of German football; it is now the fifth tier.)
  - Winner: 2005 (Note: Promoted to Regionalliga Nord)
  - Runner-up: 2003, 2004
  - Third place: 2002

=== Cup ===
- FDGB Cup (East German Cup)
  - Winners: 1960, 1972, 1974, 1980
- Olympia-Pokal (de)
  - Winners: 1964

=== Regional ===
- Gauliga Mitte (Note: The Gauliga Mitte was the highest football league in the Prussian province of Saxony and the German states of Thuringia and Anhalt from 1933 to 1945. It was also the highest top tier of German football during this time, along with 15 other regions of the Gauliga.)
  - Winners: 1935, 1936, 1940, 1941
  - Runners-up: 1939, 1942
- Thuringian Cup (Note: The Thuringia Cup also acts as a qualifier for the following season's DFB-Pokal.) (Tiers III-VII)
  - Winners: 1993, (Note: Title won by the reserve team) 1995, 1999, 2004, 2006, 2012, 2014, 2015, 2016, 2018, 2020, 2021, 2022, 2023, 2024, 2026
  - Runner-up: 2001, 2002, 2003, 2005, 2009

=== Continental ===
- UEFA Cup Winners' Cup
  - Runners-up: 1981

=== Youth ===
- German U-17 Championship
  - Runner-up: 1993

== Players ==
=== Current squad ===
As of 8 September 2026

Note: Flags indicate national team as defined under FIFA eligibility rules; some limited exceptions apply. Players may hold more than one non-FIFA nationality.

No.	Pos.	Nation	Player
1	GK	GER	Marius Liesegang
2	DF	GER	Lennox Fink
4	DF	GER	Osazee Aghatise
5	DF	GER	Sören Reddemann
6	DF	GER	Maurice Hehne
7	FW	USA	Kevin Lankford
9	FW	GER	Manassé Eshele
10	MF	ALB	Dion Ajvazi
11	FW	GER	Luca Wollschläger
12	DF	GER	Malik Talabidi
13	DF	GER	Paul Krämer
14	DF	AUT	Sebastian Aigner
15	DF	GER	Marcel Hoppe
16	FW	GER	Emilio Munser

No.	Pos.	Nation	Player
17	FW	GER	Benno Walter
18	FW	GER	Elias Löder
19	MF	GER	Jona Kratzenberg
20	FW	GER	Tristan Teuber
21	FW	GER	Pit Kirchhoff
22	GK	GER	Till Härting
23	MF	GER	Moritz Fritz
24	MF	GER	Jannes Werner
25	DF	CMR	Miguel Boog
26	DF	GER	Nils Butzen
27	GK	GER	Luca Mengel
28	FW	GER	Timon Burmeister
29	DF	GER	Maxim Hessel

=== Notable players ===
FCC sent 33 players to the DDR (East Germany) national side.

Before the end of World War II, Jena sent three players to the Germany national side: Willy Krauß (1911–12), Heinz Werner (1935) and Ludwig Gärtner (1939–41).

American defender, Brian Bliss, played at the club from 1992 to 1996 and received regular calls to the United States men's national soccer team. He went on to play for MLS side Columbus Crew and would later serve as technical director in the club's front office.

Another notable player is former Germany goalkeeper Robert Enke, who started his career at the club and then went on to play for clubs such as Hannover 96, FC Barcelona and S.L. Benfica.

== Staff ==
- Henning Bürger – Head Coach
- Patrick Widera – Chief Executive
- Ralph Grillitsch – President

== Former head coaches ==
- René Klingbeil (2023)
- Andreas Patz (2021–2022)
- Dirk Kunert (2020–2021)
- René Klingbeil (interim) (2020)
- Rico Schmitt (2019–2020)
- Christian Fröhlich (2019)
- Lukas Kwasniok (2018–2019)
- Mark Zimmermann (2016–2018)
- Volkan Uluc (2014–2016)
- Lothar Kurbjuweit (2014)
- Andreas Zimmermann (2013–2014)
- Petrik Sander (2011–2013)
- Heiko Weber (2011)
- Wolfgang Frank (2010–2011)
- René van Eck (2009–2010)
- Marc Fascher (2009)
- René van Eck (2008–2009)
- Mark Zimmermann (interim) (2008)
- Henning Bürger (2007–2008)
- Valdas Ivanauskas (2007)
- Frank Neubarth (2007)
- Mario Röser (interim) (2006)
- Marco Lohmann (interim) (2005)
- Heiko Weber (2004–2007)
- Thomas Vogel (2004)
- Uwe Dern (interim) (2003)
- Joachim Steffens (2003–2004)
- Thomas Vogel (2002–2003)
- Frank Eulberg (2002)
- Wolfgang Sandhowe (2001–2002)
- Slavko Petrović (1999–2001)
- Thomas Vogel (1999)
- Thomas Gerstner (1998–1999)
- Reiner Hollmann (1997–1998)
- Frank Engel (1997)
- Eberhard Vogel (1994–1997)
- Hans Meyer (1993–1994)
- Uwe Erkenbrecher (1993)
- Reiner Hollmann (1992–1993)
- Bernd Stange (1989–1991)
- Lutz Lindemann (1991–1992)
- Hans Meyer (1971–1983)
- Georg Buschner (1958–1971)
- Heinz Pönert (1958)
- Rolf Hüfner (1958)
- Hans Warg (1955–1957)
- Helmut Petzold (1954–1955)
- Max Hofsommer (1953–1954)
- Bernhard Schipphorst (player-manager) (1953)
- Kurt Findeisen (1951–1953)
- Hans Carl (1949–1951)
- Hermann Malter (1948–1949)
- Adolph Prokoph (1940)
- Josef Pöttinger (1934–1938)
- Hermann Peter (1903–????)

== Recent seasons ==
The recent season-by-season performance of the club:

Year	Division	Tier	Position
1999–2000	Regionalliga Nordost	III	9th
2000–01	Regionalliga Süd	III	18th ↓
2001–02	NOFV-Oberliga Süd	IV	3rd
2002–03	NOFV-Oberliga Süd	IV	2nd
2003–04	NOFV-Oberliga Süd	IV	2nd
2004–05	NOFV-Oberliga Süd	IV	1st ↑
2005–06	Regionalliga Nord	III	2nd ↑
2006–07	2. Bundesliga	II	13th
2007–08	2. Bundesliga	II	18th ↓
2008–09	3. Liga	III	16th
2009–10	3. Liga	III	5th
2010–11	3. Liga	III	15th
2011–12	3. Liga	III	18th ↓
2012–13	Regionalliga Nordost	IV	2nd
2013–14	Regionalliga Nordost	IV	3rd
2014–15	Regionalliga Nordost	IV	4th
2015–16	Regionalliga Nordost	IV	7th
2016–17	Regionalliga Nordost	IV	1st ↑
2017–18	3. Liga	III	11th
2018–19	3. Liga	III	14th
2019–20	3. Liga	III	20th ↓
2020–21	Regionalliga Nordost	IV	4th
2021–22	Regionalliga Nordost	IV	2nd
2022–23	Regionalliga Nordost	IV	2nd
2023–24	Regionalliga Nordost	IV	7th
2024–25	Regionalliga Nordost	IV	5th
2025–26	Regionalliga Nordost	IV	2nd

- With the introduction of the Regionalligas in 1994 and the 3. Liga in 2008 as the new third tier, below the 2. Bundesliga, all leagues below dropped one tier.

Key

↑ Promoted	↓ Relegated

== Former personnel ==
(Germany)

- Carsten Linke: Athletic

(Germany) Director (2008–2009)

- Stephan Lehmann: Team

psychologist (2009) (Germany)

- Roland Weissbarth: Marketing chief (2009)

(Germany)

- Peter Voß: Vice-president

(Germany)

- Peter Schreiber: President (1998–2009)
- Michael Meier

(Germany) (Hong Kong)

- Jarly Lahn Chikwan

== Reserve team ==
The club's reserve team, FC Carl Zeiss Jena II, currently plays in the tier five NOFV-Oberliga Süd. It first played at this level from 1994 to 1999, and again since 2006 with a third place in 1996 and 2010 as its best results.

The team also won the Thuringia Cup in 1993. The latter allowed the club qualification to the 1993–94 DFB-Pokal where it lost 2–0 to Bayern Munich.

== See also ==
- Works team
