= Türkiyemspor Berlin =

- Full name: Türkiyemspor Berlin 1978 e.V.
- Nickname: Türkiyem
- Founded: 1978; 48 years ago
- Ground: Willy-Kressmann-Stadion
- Capacity: 5,000
- Chairman: Ali Durmuş Matur
- Manager: Ayhan Bilek
- League: Landesliga Berlin Staffel 1 (VII)
- 2021–22: Berlin-Liga 17th (relegated)
Home colours	Away colours

Türkiyemspor Berlin is a German association football club from Berlin. The club began in 1978 as a loose association of young footballers playing recreationally as Kreuzberg Gençler Birliği (Kreuzberg Youth Union), named after the Berlin district of Kreuzberg. The club was formally registered as BFC İzmirspor in 1983 and was named for the city of İzmir, Turkey where many of the club members had roots.

== History ==
Logo of from the 1990s

In its first season of play in 1983–84 in the C-Klasse amateur league the team captured the division title and they continued to enjoy other successes that would lead to their promotion to fourth-division play in the Landesliga Berlin in 1986, followed immediately by a climb into the third division Amateur-Oberliga Berlin the next season. Small businesses within the Turkish immigrant community in Berlin have played an important role in supporting the club throughout its history and in 1987 the team changed its name, becoming Türkiyemspor Berlin in order to broaden its appeal.

The club would field competitive sides in the third division (known variously as the Amateur Oberliga Berlin, the Amateur Oberliga Nordost-Mitte, and Regionalliga Nordost through this period) from the late 80s and on into the mid-90s. They also captured three consecutive Paul Rusch Cups (today's Berlin Cup) from 1989 to 1991 while making cup final appearances in 1988, 1993, and 1995. Those wins put them into DFB-Pokal competition: they were put out in the first round in each of their first two appearances and advanced only as far as the second round in the 1991–92 tournament.

The club suffered a devastating blow in the 1990–91 season when they missed an opportunity for promotion to the 2. Fußball-Bundesliga when they were sanctioned for the use of an ineligible player. The club was leading its division in a close race with Tennis Borussia Berlin when an arbitrator ruled that the transfer to Türkiyemspor of player Piotr Podkowik was illegal under league rules. Prior to this the BFV (Berliner Fußball-Verband or Berlin Football Federation) had approved the use of the player by the club. The president of the federation apologized, indicating that the league had made a mistake and that the club was blameless. By the time the unexpected decision had come down, Podkowik had already appeared in seven matches with the team and they were ordered to replay three of these games. The division title came down to the final game of the season against TeBe with Türkiyemspor needing only a draw to advance: instead they went down to a stinging 0–5 defeat and so failed to advance. Since then the team has seen a dramatic decline in the number of spectators attending their matches.

By the mid-90s the team found itself overmatched and slipped to fourth-tier play in the Amateur Oberliga Nordost-Nord after a last place finish in 1995. Türkiyemspor fell to the Verbandsliga Berlin (V) in 1998 and spent two seasons there before returning to the Oberliga Nordost-Nord (IV) on the strength of a division championship in 2000. They continue to compete at this level, earning uneven results at or just below the mid-table. They finished NOFV-Oberliga Nord as 3rd in 2007–08 season and became one of the North Group of Regionalliga founders. They finished 15th Regionalliga in 2008–09 season and normally relegated to Oberliga Nord. However, they remained in Regionalliga after Kickers Emden's forced relegation from 3. Liga to the Oberliga due to financial problems.

The club went into administration in December 2011 and withdrew their first team from the 2011–12 NOFV-Oberliga a month later; however, they still administer the women's and youth's teams. Despite the club being immersed in insolvency proceedings, the first team returned to league football and entered the Berlin-Liga (VI) in 2012, where they finished third from bottom. They were sent down to the Landesliga Berlin (VII) after a 26-year absence. After five years they won promotion back to the Berlin-Liga but after a 17th place in 2022 they were relegated again to the Landesliga.

== Women ==
Türkiyemspor started a girl's section in 2004, and later started fielding senior women's teams as well. The first women's team won promotion from 6th tier Bezirksliga to Landesliga in 2012, to the Berlin-Liga in 2016, and to the Regionalliga Nordost in 2020. They finished 2nd in the Regionalliga in 2022, won the Berlin Cup the same year and qualified for the 2022–23 DFB-Pokal.

== Impact of the club on German football ==
Türkiyemspor is recognised as being among the most successful clubs spawned within Germany's immigrant communities. They have contributed to creating a positive image for their community and helped set a confident example for Turks in the country with many other ethnically-Turkish clubs following in their footsteps. The name Türkiyemspor is now also used by clubs in Mönchengladbach, Wuppertal, Breuberg, Amsterdam, Australia, and the United States.

The club is actively involved several community-oriented programs built around anti-racism, intercultural understanding, a campaign against violence in families, and a campaign for respect for homosexuals known as "Respect-Gaymes".

Working with the German Football Association Türkiyemspor paved the way for teams rooted in the country's various immigrant communities (Migrantenvereine) to participate in first- and second-division football in Germany. Normally, league rules limit the number of foreign players permitted in a team's squad. Türkiyemspor squads typically included many players without German citizenship from families of long-term migrant workers in the Turkish community. League rules were modified to exempt players without citizenship who could show that they had played several years of youth football in Germany.

== Famous players ==
More than forty players have gone on to professional careers after getting their start with Türkiyemspor. The most widely recognized of these is Ümit Karan who joined the Turkish club Gençlerbirliği before moving on to Galatasaray. Other former Türkiyemspor players currently active professionally in Turkey include Cemil Mengi at Çaykur Rizespor, Serkan Birtan at Istanbul club Eyüpspor, and Deniz Aydoğdu at İzmir club Karşıyaka.

Michael Fuß set a Verbandsliga goal scoring record with 66 tallies in 1999–2000. Later Nigerian National Team Member Leon Balogun started his career in 2007 with Türkiyemspor.

- (Germany) Kemal Halat
- (Bosnia and Herzegovina) Emir Tufek

== Honours ==
=== Men ===
- Verbandsliga Berlin (V)
  - Champions: 2000
- Berliner Landespokal
  - Winners: 1988, 1990, 1991
  - Runners-up: 1989, 1993, 1995, 2001

=== Women ===
- Berlin-Liga (IV)
  - Champions: 2020
- Berliner Landespokal
  - Winners: 2022
