= 1989–90 VfL Bochum season =

VfL Bochum
1989–90 season
- President: Ottokar Wüst
- Head Coach: Reinhard Saftig
- Stadium: Ruhrstadion
- Bundesliga: 16th
- Relegation playoff: Winner
- DFB-Pokal: Second Round
- Top goalscorer: League: Leifeld (10); All: Leifeld (11)
- Highest home attendance: 40,000 (vs Borussia Mönchengladbach, 1 May 1990)
- Lowest home attendance: 9,500 (vs Bayer 05 Uerdingen, 10 March 1990)
- Average home league attendance: 18,365
Home colours	Away colours	Third colours

The 1989–90 VfL Bochum season was the 52nd season in club history.

== Matches ==
=== Legend ===
Win Draw Loss

=== Bundesliga ===
29 July 1989 1	VfL Bochum	0 – 1	1. FC Köln	Bochum
15:30			Rahn 58' (pen.)	Stadium: Ruhrstadion; Attendance: 21,000; Referee: Aron Schmidhuber (Ottobrunn)

5 August 1989 2	SV Waldhof Mannheim	3 – 2	VfL Bochum	Mannheim
15:30	Dais 5' (pen.); Rudel 38'; Freiler 65'		Kohn 8' (pen.); Kempe 90'	Stadium: Stadion am Alsenweg; Attendance: 11,000; Referee: Hans-Peter Dellwing (Trier)

12 August 1989 3	VfL Bochum	3 – 1	Hamburger SV	Bochum
15:30	Wegmann 43'; Kempe 84'; Leifeld 88'		von Heesen 69'	Stadium: Ruhrstadion; Attendance: 15,000; Referee: Werner Föckler (Bad Dürkheim)

16 August 1989 4	Eintracht Frankfurt	4 – 0	VfL Bochum	Frankfurt am Main
20:00	Gründel 19'; Turowski 30', 57'; Andersen 64'			Stadium: Waldstadion; Attendance: 25,000; Referee: Hans-Heinrich Barnick (Schenfeld)

23 August 1989 5	Fortuna Düsseldorf	2 – 2	VfL Bochum	Düsseldorf
20:00	Klotz 71'; Fuchs 78'		Leifeld 37', 51'	Stadium: Rheinstadion; Attendance: 14,500; Referee: Markus Merk (Otterbach)

26 August 1989 6	VfL Bochum	2 – 0	VfB Stuttgart	Bochum
15:30	Leifeld 5', 35'			Stadium: Ruhrstadion; Attendance: 13,000; Referee: Wolf-Rüdiger Umbach (Rottdorf)

1 September 1989 7	Bayer 05 Uerdingen	3 – 1	VfL Bochum	Krefeld
19:30	Fach 20', 38'; Laudrup 46'		Leifeld 80'	Stadium: Grotenburg-Stadion; Attendance: 11,500; Referee: Alfons Berg (Konz)

9 September 1989 8	VfL Bochum	2 – 0	1. FC Kaiserslautern	Bochum
15:30	Kohn 49'; Wegmann 77'			Stadium: Ruhrstadion; Attendance: 13,500; Referee: Hans Fux (Stutensee)

16 September 1989 9	FC Bayern Munich	5 – 1	VfL Bochum	Munich
15:30	McInally 2', 68'; Schwabl 19'; Oswald 71' (o.g.); Thon 73'		Kohn 70' (pen.)	Stadium: Olympiastadion; Attendance: 26,000; Referee: Wilfried Heitmann (Drentwede)

20 September 1989 10	VfL Bochum	0 – 2	Bayer 04 Leverkusen	Bochum
20:00			Demandt 56', 75'	Stadium: Ruhrstadion; Attendance: 13,700; Referee: Hermann Albrecht (Kaufbeuren)

29 September 1989 11	FC St. Pauli	2 – 0	VfL Bochum	Hamburg
19:30	Golke 14'; Knäbel 88'			Stadium: Wilhelm-Koch-Stadion; Attendance: 18,300; Referee: Manfred Amerell (Munich)

7 October 1989 12	VfL Bochum	0 – 0	SV Werder Bremen	Bochum
15:30				Stadium: Ruhrstadion; Attendance: 10,500; Referee: Kurt Witke (Mönchzell)

13 October 1989 13	Borussia Dortmund	0 – 1	VfL Bochum	Dortmund
20:00			Reekers 61'	Stadium: Westfalenstadion; Attendance: 40,110; Referee: Manfred Neuner (Leimen)

21 October 1989 14	VfL Bochum	3 – 3	1. FC Nürnberg	Bochum
15:30	Leifeld 14'; Wegmann 43'; Kohn 56'		Türr 63', 85'; Kristl 68'	Stadium: Ruhrstadion; Attendance: 14,500; Referee: Heinz Werner (Auersmacher)

28 October 1989 15	Borussia Mönchengladbach	1 – 2	VfL Bochum	Mönchengladbach
15:30	Bruns 75'		Leifeld 22'; Wegmann 55'	Stadium: Bökelbergstadion; Attendance: 9,900; Referee: Eugen Strigel (Horb am Neckar)

3 November 1989 16	VfL Bochum	1 – 0	FC 08 Homburg	Bochum
19:30	Nehl 47'			Stadium: Ruhrstadion; Attendance: 13,500; Referee: Hans Scheuerer (Munich)

18 November 1989 17	Karlsruher SC	2 – 0	VfL Bochum	Karlsruhe
15:30	Schütterle 31'; Harforth 44' (pen.)			Stadium: Wildparkstadion; Attendance: 17,000; Referee: Hans-Joachim Osmers (Bremen)

25 November 1989 18	1. FC Köln	2 – 0	VfL Bochum	Cologne
15:30	Janßen 38'; Rudy 47'			Stadium: Radrennbahn Müngersdorf; Attendance: 15,000; Referee: Dieter Pauly (Rheydt)

1 December 1989 19	VfL Bochum	2 – 0	SV Waldhof Mannheim	Bochum
20:00	Kohn 33' (pen.); Nehl 76'			Stadium: Ruhrstadion; Attendance: 9,000; Referee: Wilfried Heitmann (Drentwede)

9 December 1989 20	Hamburger SV	1 – 4	VfL Bochum	Hamburg
15:30	Dammeier 80'		Rzehaczek 8', 30'; Benatelli 13'; Leifeld 16'	Stadium: Volksparkstadion; Attendance: 8,100; Referee: Markus Merk (Otterbach)

14 December 1989 21	VfL Bochum	2 – 2	Eintracht Frankfurt	Bochum
20:15	Nehl 49'; Rzehaczek 51'		Andersen 15'; Körbel 27'	Stadium: Ruhrstadion; Attendance: 20,500; Referee: Hans-Peter Dellwing (Trier)

24 February 1990 22	VfL Bochum	1 – 2	Fortuna Düsseldorf	Bochum
15:30	Kempe 78'		Krümpelmann 43'; Baffoe 60' (pen.)	Stadium: Ruhrstadion; Attendance: 18,500; Referee: Werner Föckler (Bad Dürkheim)

3 March 1990 23	VfB Stuttgart	1 – 0	VfL Bochum	Stuttgart
15:30	O. Schmäler 71'			Stadium: Neckarstadion; Attendance: 14,000; Referee: Lutz Michael Fröhlich (West Berlin)

10 March 1990 24	VfL Bochum	2 – 1	Bayer 05 Uerdingen	Bochum
15:30	Rzehaczek 2'; Wegmann 19'		Ridder 44' (o.g.)	Stadium: Ruhrstadion; Attendance: 9,500; Referee: Manfred Neuner (Leimen)

17 March 1990 25	1. FC Kaiserslautern	2 – 1	VfL Bochum	Kaiserslautern
15:30	Lelle 75'; Kuntz 85'		Rzehaczek 13'	Stadium: Fritz-Walter-Stadion; Attendance: 22,218; Referee: Manfred Amerell (Munich)

24 March 1990 26	VfL Bochum	0 – 0	FC Bayern Munich	Bochum
15:30				Stadium: Ruhrstadion; Attendance: 33,000; Referee: Manfred Harder (Lüneburg)

31 March 1990 27	Bayer 04 Leverkusen	2 – 1	VfL Bochum	Leverkusen
15:30	Feinbier 4'; Kree 61'		Rzehaczek 13' (pen.)	Stadium: Ulrich-Haberland-Stadion; Attendance: 14,000; Referee: Hans-Jürgen Weber (Bielefeld)

6 April 1990 28	VfL Bochum	3 – 3	FC St. Pauli	Bochum
20:00	Kohn 37'; Legat 53'; Rzehaczek 60'		Golke 22', 31'; Knäbel 42'	Stadium: Ruhrstadion; Attendance: 13,000; Referee: Hermann Albrecht (Kaufbeuren)

12 April 1990 29	SV Werder Bremen	1 – 1	VfL Bochum	Bremen
20:00	Riedle 83'		Ridder 30'	Stadium: Weserstadion; Attendance: 14,056; Referee: Rainer Boos (Kronberg)

21 April 1990 30	VfL Bochum	2 – 3	Borussia Dortmund	Bochum
15:30	Nehl 68', 82'		Breitzke 20'; Möller 60'; Helmer 70'	Stadium: Ruhrstadion; Attendance: 36,000; Referee: Hans-Heinrich Barnick (Schenfeld)

28 April 1990 31	1. FC Nürnberg	2 – 1	VfL Bochum	Nuremberg
15:30	Wirsching 22'; Philipkowski 86'		Ostermann 83'	Stadium: Städtisches Stadion; Attendance: 16,500; Referee: Wolf-Günter Wiesel (Ottbergen)

1 May 1990 32	VfL Bochum	2 – 1	Borussia Mönchengladbach	Bochum
20:00	Wegmann 4'; Leifeld 34'		Hochstätter 37'	Stadium: Ruhrstadion; Attendance: 40,000; Referee: Wilfried Heitmann (Drentwede)

5 May 1990 33	FC 08 Homburg	1 – 0	VfL Bochum	Homburg
15:30	Westerbeek 58'			Stadium: Waldstadion; Attendance: 3,500; Referee: Aron Schmidhuber (Ottobrunn)

12 May 1990 34	VfL Bochum	2 – 0	Karlsruher SC	Bochum
15:30	Rzehaczek 25'; Nehl 36'			Stadium: Ruhrstadion; Attendance: 18,000; Referee: Edgar Steinborn (Sinzig)

==== Relegation playoff ====
24 May 1990 1st leg	1. FC Saarbrücken	0 – 1	VfL Bochum	Saarbrücken
19:15			Legat 65' (pen.)	Stadium: Ludwigsparkstadion; Attendance: 30,000; Referee: Manfred Neuner (Leimen)

27 May 1990 2nd leg	VfL Bochum	1 – 1 (2 – 1 agg.)	1. FC Saarbrücken	Bochum
20:15	Leifeld 76'		Yeboah 49'	Stadium: Ruhrstadion; Attendance: 25,000; Referee: Aron Schmidhuber (Ottobrunn)

=== DFB-Pokal ===
19 August 1989 R1	SV Wiesbaden	0 – 2	VfL Bochum	Wiesbaden
			Wegmann 80', 90'	Stadium: Stadion an der Berliner Straße; Attendance: 2,500; Referee: Siegbert Rubel (Neukenroth)

23 September 1989 R2	1. FC Pforzheim	1 – 0	VfL Bochum	Pforzheim
	Pfirrmann 77'			Stadium: Stadion Holzhof; Attendance: 5,200; Referee: Gerald Kraus (Pfaffenhausen)

== Squad ==
=== Squad and statistics ===
==== Squad, appearances and goals scored ====
No.	Pos	Nat	Player	Total		Bundesliga		Relegation playoff		DFB-Pokal	
No.	Pos	Nat	Player	Apps	Goals	Apps	Goals	Apps	Goals	Apps	Goals
	MF	(West Germany) FRG	Frank Benatelli	30	1	28	1	0	0	2	0
	DF	(West Germany) FRG	Olaf Dreßel	23	0	21	0	2	0	0	0
	MF	(West Germany) FRG	Dirk Eitzert	2	0	2	0	0	0	0	0
	FW	(West Germany) FRG	Thomas Epp	2	0	2	0	0	0	0	0
	MF	(Hungary) HUN	László Farkasházy	10	0	8	0	0	0	2	0
	MF	(West Germany) FRG	Frank Heinemann	22	0	20	0	1	0	1	0
	DF	(West Germany) FRG	Michael Hubner	14	0	12	0	2	0	0	0
	FW	(West Germany) FRG	Andreas Jeschke	0	0	0	0	0	0	0	0
	DF	(West Germany) FRG	Thomas Kempe	33	3	30	3	2	0	1	0
	FW	(West Germany) FRG	Stefan Kohn	31	6	29	6	0	0	2	0
	FW	(Socialist Federal Republic of Yugoslavia) YUG	Kreso Kovacec	0	0	0	0	0	0	0	0
	MF	(West Germany) FRG	Joachim Kusch	0	0	0	0	0	0	0	0
	MF	(West Germany) FRG	Thorsten Legat	32	2	28	1	2	1	2	0
	FW	(West Germany) FRG	Uwe Leifeld	34	11	30	10	2	1	2	0
	MF	(West Germany) FRG	Meinolf Mehls (since 6 April 1990)	1	0	1	0	0	0	0	0
	MF	(West Germany) FRG	Josef Nehl	29	4	26	4	2	0	1	0
	MF	(West Germany) FRG	Elard Ostermann	24	1	21	1	1	0	2	0
	DF	(West Germany) FRG	Walter Oswald	23	0	21	0	2	0	0	0
	DF	(Netherlands) NED	Gerrit Plomp (until 10 December 1989)	11	0	10	0	0	0	1	0
	DF	(Netherlands) NED	Rob Reekers	35	1	31	1	2	0	2	0
	DF	(West Germany) FRG	Andreas Ridder	11	1	8	1	2	0	1	0
	MF	(West Germany) FRG	Michael Rzehaczek	36	8	32	8	2	0	2	0
	DF	(West Germany) FRG	Dirk Sadowicz	1	0	1	0	0	0	0	0
	MF	(West Germany) FRG	Martin Slawinski	0	0	0	0	0	0	0	0
	MF	(West Germany) FRG	Uwe Wegmann	35	8	31	6	2	0	2	2
	GK	(West Germany) FRG	Andreas Wessels	19	0	17	0	2	0	0	0
	DF	(West Germany) FRG	Peter Zanter	11	0	10	0	0	0	1	0
	GK	(West Germany) FRG	Ralf Zumdick	19	0	17	0	0	0	2	0

=== Transfers ===
==== Summer ====
In:

No.	Pos.	Nation	Player
—	MF	FRG	Dirk Eitzert (from SF Oestrich-Iserlohn)
—	MF	HUN	László Farkasházy (from BVSC Budapest)
—	FW	FRG	Andreas Jeschke (from VfB Lübeck)
—	FW	FRG	Stefan Kohn (from Hannover 96)
—	FW	CRO	Kreso Kovacec (from VfL Bochum II)
—	MF	FRG	Elard Ostermann (from TuS Hoisdorf)
—	DF	NED	Gerrit Plomp (from FC Utrecht)
—	DF	FRG	Andreas Ridder (from Arminia Bielefeld)
—	MF	FRG	Uwe Wegmann (from Rot-Weiss Essen)
—	DF	FRG	Peter Zanter (from Hannover 96)

Out:

No.	Pos.	Nation	Player
—	FW	FRG	Thorsten Bolzek (to Fortuna Köln)
—	MF	FRG	Dirk Bremser (to SC Preußen Münster)
—	MF	POL	Andrzej Iwan (to Górnik Zabrze)
—	DF	FRG	Peter Jackisch (to Alemannia Aachen)
—	DF	FRG	Martin Kree (to Bayer 04 Leverkusen)
—	MF	FRG	Dirk Riechmann (to SC Preußen Münster)
—	DF	FRG	Oliver Westerbeek (to FC 08 Homburg)
—	DF	FRG	Lothar Woelk (to MSV Duisburg)

==== Winter ====
In:

No.	Pos.	Nation	Player
—	MF	FRG	Meinolf Mehls (from VfL Bochum II)

Out:

No.	Pos.	Nation	Player
—	DF	NED	Gerrit Plomp (to Feyenoord)

== VfL Bochum II ==
No.	Pos	Nat	Player	Total		Oberliga Westfalen	
No.	Pos	Nat	Player	Apps	Goals	Apps	Goals
	MF	(West Germany) FRG	Andreas Blaumann	14	1	14	1
	MF	(West Germany) FRG	Christian Broos	21	3	21	3
	GK	(West Germany) FRG	Roger Dorny	28	0	28	0
	DF	(West Germany) FRG	Olaf Dreßel	9	0	9	0
	MF	(West Germany) FRG	Dirk Eitzert	25	4	25	4
	MF	(West Germany) FRG	Knut Hartwig	25	0	25	0
	MF	(West Germany) FRG	Thomas Hein	6	0	6	0
	DF	(West Germany) FRG	Michael Hubner	14	7	14	7
	FW	(West Germany) FRG	Andreas Jeschke	16	5	16	5
	MF	(West Germany) FRG	Markus Jürgens	25	10	25	10
	FW	(West Germany) FRG	Karsten Kirschke	11	0	11	0
	FW	(Socialist Federal Republic of Yugoslavia) YUG	Kreso Kovacec	24	10	24	10
	MF	(West Germany) FRG	Ortwin Kreielkamp	8	1	8	1
	MF	(West Germany) FRG	Joachim Kusch	16	0	16	0
	DF	(West Germany) FRG	Andreas Luhn	14	0	14	0
	MF	(West Germany) FRG	Meinolf Mehls	30	0	30	0
	FW	(Greece) GRE	Moysidis	11	2	11	2
	MF	(West Germany) FRG	Peter Peschel	2	0	2	0
	MF	(West Germany) FRG	Pöhler	17	0	17	0
	DF	(West Germany) FRG	Andreas Pospiech	16	0	16	0
	DF	(West Germany) FRG	Jens Renkhoff	17	0	17	0
	GK	(West Germany) FRG	Andreas Roch	4	0	4	0
	MF	(West Germany) FRG	Dirk Sadowicz	26	0	26	0
