= 1990–91 VfL Bochum season =

VfL Bochum
1990–91 season
- President: Ottokar Wüst
- Head Coach: Reinhard Saftig (until 22 April 1991); Rolf Schafstall (ad interim, since 22 April 1991)
- Stadium: Ruhrstadion
- Bundesliga: 14th
- DFB-Pokal: First round
- Intertoto Cup: Group stage
- Top goalscorer: League: Kohn (11); All: Kohn (14)
- Highest home attendance: 40,051 (vs FC Bayern Munich, 6 April 1991)
- Lowest home attendance: 11,000 (vs Bayer 05 Uerdingen, 16 April 1991)
- Average home league attendance: 18,786
Home colours	Away colours

The 1990–91 VfL Bochum season was the 53rd season in club history.

== Review and events ==
On 22 April 1991 head coach Reinhard Saftig was sacked and replaced by caretaker Rolf Schafstall.

== Matches ==
=== Legend ===
Win Draw Loss

=== Bundesliga ===
11 August 1990 1	Borussia Mönchengladbach	1 – 2	VfL Bochum	Mönchengladbach
15:30	Stefes 42'		Kempe 13'; Peschel 61'	Stadium: Bökelbergstadion; Attendance: 14,500; Referee: Hans Scheuerer (Munich)

18 August 1990 2	VfL Bochum	1 – 0	1. FC Köln	Bochum
15:30	Kohn 84'			Stadium: Ruhrstadion; Attendance: 20,000; Referee: Hans-Jürgen Weber (Bielefeld)

24 August 1990 3	Hamburger SV	1 – 0	VfL Bochum	Hamburg
20:00	Furtok 33'			Stadium: Volksparkstadion; Attendance: 16,900; Referee: Hans Fux (Stutensee)

1 September 1990 4	VfL Bochum	0 – 0	Eintracht Frankfurt	Bochum
15:30				Stadium: Ruhrstadion; Attendance: 18,504; Referee: Alfons Berg (Konz)

7 September 1990 5	Borussia Dortmund	1 – 0	VfL Bochum	Dortmund
20:00	MacLeod 85'			Stadium: Westfalenstadion; Attendance: 35,789; Referee: Hans-Joachim Osmers (Bremen)

15 September 1990 6	VfL Bochum	4 – 2	Hertha BSC	Bochum
15:30	Rzehaczek 9'; Kohn 40'; Legat 58', 90'		Rahn 32'; Kruse 88' (pen.)	Stadium: Ruhrstadion; Attendance: 14,000; Referee: Karl Gangkofer (Eggenfelden)

22 September 1990 7	FC Bayern Munich	2 – 2	VfL Bochum	Munich
15:30	Wohlfarth 4'; Augenthaler 33'		Kohler 47' (o.g.); Legat 84'	Stadium: Olympiastadion; Attendance: 29,000; Referee: Wolfgang Mierswa (Hennigsen)

29 September 1990 8	VfL Bochum	0 – 0	1. FC Nürnberg	Bochum
15:30				Stadium: Ruhrstadion; Attendance: 18,000; Referee: Gerhard Theobald (Neunkirchen)

5 October 1990 9	Bayer 05 Uerdingen	4 – 1	VfL Bochum	Krefeld
20:00	Funkel 12' (pen.); Zietsch 30'; Bartram 83'		Kempe 45'	Stadium: Grotenburg-Stadion; Attendance: 11,200; Referee: Eugen Strigel (Horb am Neckar)

13 October 1990 10	VfL Bochum	3 – 1	Bayer 04 Leverkusen	Bochum
15:30	Rzehaczek 44'; Kohn 76', 89'		Kirsten 41'	Stadium: Ruhrstadion; Attendance: 16,541; Referee: Dieter Birlenbach (Hattenheim)

19 October 1990 11	FC St. Pauli	3 – 3	VfL Bochum	Hamburg
20:00	Golke 3', 68'; Steubing 54'		Kohn 6'; Heinemann 11'; Peschel 87'	Stadium: Wilhelm-Koch-Stadion; Attendance: 20,450; Referee: Hans-Peter Dellwing (Trier)

26 October 1990 12	VfL Bochum	1 – 1	VfB Stuttgart	Bochum
20:00	Legat 74'		Gaudino 53'	Stadium: Ruhrstadion; Attendance: 17,501; Referee: Wolf-Günter Wiesel (Ottbergen)

10 November 1990 13	Karlsruher SC	3 – 2	VfL Bochum	Karlsruhe
15:30	Glesius 23'; Schütterle 55'; Bogdan 79'		Kreuzer 28' (o.g.); Legat 42'	Stadium: Wildparkstadion; Attendance: 12,000; Referee: Michael Malbranc (Hamburg)

17 November 1990 14	VfL Bochum	0 – 2	1. FC Kaiserslautern	Bochum
15:30			Stadler 55'; Hoffmann 62'	Stadium: Ruhrstadion; Attendance: 14,000; Referee: Aron Schmidhuber (Ottobrunn)

1 December 1990 15	VfL Bochum	0 – 0	Fortuna Düsseldorf	Bochum
15:30				Stadium: Ruhrstadion; Attendance: 13,500; Referee: Hermann Albrecht (Kaufbeuren)

8 December 1990 16	SG Wattenscheid 09	0 – 4	VfL Bochum	Bochum
15:30			Kohn 18'; Nehl 63'; Peschel 85', 88'	Stadium: Ruhrstadion; Attendance: 33,300; Referee: Werner Föckler (Bad Dürkheim)

14 December 1990 17	VfL Bochum	1 – 2	SV Werder Bremen	Bochum
20:00	Legat 80' (pen.)		Rufer 23', 57'	Stadium: Ruhrstadion; Attendance: 13,500; Referee: Hans-Peter Dellwing (Trier)

23 February 1991 18	VfL Bochum	3 – 0	Borussia Mönchengladbach	Bochum
15:30	Kohn 15'; Kempe 37'; Nehl 68'			Stadium: Ruhrstadion; Attendance: 24,103; Referee: Karl-Josef Assenmacher (Fischenich)

2 March 1991 19	1. FC Köln	0 – 0	VfL Bochum	Cologne
15:30				Stadium: Radrennbahn Müngersdorf; Attendance: 15,000; Referee: Alfons Berg (Konz)

9 March 1991 20	VfL Bochum	0 – 1	Hamburger SV	Bochum
15:30			Eck 39'	Stadium: Ruhrstadion; Attendance: 17,500; Referee: Markus Merk (Otterbach)

16 March 1991 21	Eintracht Frankfurt	1 – 1	VfL Bochum	Frankfurt am Main
15:30	Reekers 8' (o.g.)		Kohn 2'	Stadium: Waldstadion; Attendance: 15,300; Referee: Günther Habermann (Weißensee)

23 March 1991 22	VfL Bochum	2 – 2	Borussia Dortmund	Bochum
15:30	Peschel 51'; Rzehaczek 90'		Zorc 30' (pen.); Breitzke 41'	Stadium: Ruhrstadion; Attendance: 32,000; Referee: Karl-Heinz Tritschler (Freiburg)

2 April 1991 23	Hertha BSC	2 – 4	VfL Bochum	Berlin
20:00	Gries 24' (pen.); Unglaube 84'		Milde 13'; Nehl 39'; Wegmann 70', 73'	Stadium: Olympiastadion; Attendance: 7,052; Referee: Hans Scheuerer (Munich)

6 April 1991 24	VfL Bochum	1 – 2	FC Bayern Munich	Bochum
15:30	Heinemann 22' (pen.)		Bender 51'; Wohlfarth 73'	Stadium: Ruhrstadion; Attendance: 40,051; Referee: Manfred Harder (Lüneburg)

13 April 1991 25	1. FC Nürnberg	3 – 2	VfL Bochum	Nuremberg
15:30	Eckstein 7', 44' (pen.), 78'		Helmig 5'; Reekers 49'	Stadium: Städtisches Stadion; Attendance: 15,800; Referee: Hans Fux (Stutensee)

16 April 1991 26	VfL Bochum	0 – 2	Bayer 05 Uerdingen	Bochum
20:00			Paßlack 25'; Fach 90'	Stadium: Ruhrstadion; Attendance: 11,000; Referee: Wolf-Rüdiger Umbach (Rottdorf)

20 April 1991 27	Bayer 04 Leverkusen	4 – 2	VfL Bochum	Leverkusen
15:30	Leśniak 10'; Kirsten 46'; Foda 68'; Schreier 79' (pen.)		Heinemann 34' (pen.); Kohn 68'	Stadium: Ulrich-Haberland-Stadion; Attendance: 10,800; Referee: Aron Schmidhuber (Ottobrunn)

3 May 1991 28	VfL Bochum	3 – 0	FC St. Pauli	Bochum
20:00	Legat 62'; Kohn 77', 89'			Stadium: Ruhrstadion; Attendance: 12,500; Referee: Dieter Birlenbach (Hattenheim)

10 May 1991 29	VfB Stuttgart	2 – 2	VfL Bochum	Stuttgart
20:00	Kastl 62'; Sammer 87'		Rzehaczek 55'; Nehl 57'	Stadium: Neckarstadion; Attendance: 15,000; Referee: Rainer Boos (Kronberg)

18 May 1991 30	VfL Bochum	0 – 1	Karlsruher SC	Bochum
15:30			Scholl 18'	Stadium: Ruhrstadion; Attendance: 11,670; Referee: Hans-Jürgen Kasper (Katlenburg)

24 May 1991 31	1. FC Kaiserslautern	4 – 1	VfL Bochum	Kaiserslautern
20:00	Kuntz 35', 66'; Goldbæk 45'; Scherr 61'		Helmig 16'	Stadium: Fritz-Walter-Stadion; Attendance: 38,000; Referee: Karl-Heinz Tritschler (Freiburg)

31 May 1991 32	Fortuna Düsseldorf	3 – 4	VfL Bochum	Düsseldorf
20:00	Andersen 3'; Spanring 10'; Allofs 31'		Rzehaczek 36'; Nehl 48'; Helmig 67'; Heinemann 69' (pen.)	Stadium: Rheinstadion; Attendance: 11,000; Referee: Manfred Neuner (Leimen)

8 June 1991 33	VfL Bochum	0 – 0	SG Wattenscheid 09	Bochum
15:30				Stadium: Ruhrstadion; Attendance: 25,000; Referee: Hans Scheuerer (Munich)

15 June 1991 34	SV Werder Bremen	2 – 1	VfL Bochum	Bremen
15:30	Votava 40'; Harttgen 44'		Epp 70'	Stadium: Weserstadion; Attendance: 14,492; Referee: Wieland Ziller (Laußnitz)

=== DFB-Pokal ===
5 August 1990 R1	SV Waldhof Mannheim	3 – 2	VfL Bochum	Mannheim
18:00	Hecking 23', 74'; Dais 59' (pen.)		Kohn 83', 86'	Stadium: Stadion am Alsenweg; Attendance: 7,000; Referee: Eugen Strigel (Horb am Neckar)

=== Intertoto Cup ===
1 July 1990 GS1	VfL Bochum	1 – 0	(Bulgaria) PFC Slavia Sofia
	Kempe 89'			Attendance: 1,500

5 July 1990 GS2	VfL Bochum	2 – 1	(Switzerland) FC St. Gallen
	Wegmann 3', 87'		Rubio 88'	Attendance: 800

8 July 1990 GS3	VfL Bochum	2 – 3	(Austria) FC Swarovski Tirol
	Kohn ?'; Heinemann ?' (pen.)			Attendance: 1,500

14 July 1990 GS4	FC Swarovski Tirol (Austria)	1 – 0	VfL Bochum
	Pacult 79'			Attendance: 1,000

18 July 1990 GS5	FC St. Gallen (Switzerland)	0 – 2	VfL Bochum
			Kempe 44'; Epp 48'	Attendance: 2,000

22 July 1990 GS6	PFC Slavia Sofia (Bulgaria)	1 – 1	VfL Bochum
	Angelov 68'		Nehl 28'	Attendance: 2,000

== Squad ==
=== Squad and statistics ===
==== Squad, appearances and goals scored ====
No.	Pos	Nat	Player	Total		Bundesliga		DFB-Pokal		Intertoto Cup	
No.	Pos	Nat	Player	Apps	Goals	Apps	Goals	Apps	Goals	Apps	Goals
	MF	(Germany) GER	Frank Benatelli	5	0	5	0	0	0		
	DF	(Germany) GER	Olaf Dreßel	20	0	20	0	0	0		
	MF	(Germany) GER	Dirk Eitzert	0	0	0	0	0	0		
	FW	(Germany) GER	Thomas Epp	4	1	3	1	1	0		
	DF	(France) FRA	Patrick Guillou	1	0	1	0	0	0		
	MF	(Germany) GER	Frank Heinemann	32	4	31	4	1	0		
	MF	(Germany) GER	Dirk Helmig	11	3	11	3	0	0		
	DF	(Germany) GER	Christian Herrmann	18	0	18	0	0	0		
	DF	(Germany) GER	Michael Hubner	7	0	7	0	0	0		
	DF	(Germany) GER	Thomas Kempe	28	3	27	3	1	0		
	FW	(Germany) GER	Stefan Kohn	27	13	26	11	1	2		
	MF	(Germany) GER	Thorsten Legat	32	7	31	7	1	0		
	FW	(Germany) GER	Uwe Leifeld	6	0	6	0	0	0		
	FW	(Germany) GER	Rocco Milde	17	1	17	1	0	0		
	MF	(Germany) GER	Josef Nehl	29	5	28	5	1	0		
	FW	(Germany) GER	Elard Ostermann	7	0	6	0	1	0		
	DF	(Germany) GER	Walter Oswald	27	0	27	0	0	0		
	MF	(Germany) GER	Peter Peschel	29	5	29	5	0	0		
	DF	(Netherlands) NED	Rob Reekers	32	1	31	1	1	0		
	DF	(Germany) GER	Andreas Ridder	19	0	18	0	1	0		
	MF	(Germany) GER	Michael Rzehaczek	30	5	29	5	1	0		
	MF	(Germany) GER	Uwe Wegmann	28	2	27	2	1	0		
	GK	(Germany) GER	Andreas Wessels	35	0	34	0	1	0		
	FW	(Germany) GER	Adam Woitynek	0	0	0	0	0	0		
	DF	(Germany) GER	Peter Zanter	8	0	7	0	1	0		
	GK	(Germany) GER	Ralf Zumdick	0	0	0	0	0	0		

=== Transfers ===
==== Summer ====
In:

No.	Pos.	Nation	Player
—	DF	FRA	Patrick Guillou (from Freiburger FC)
—	MF	GER	Dirk Helmig (from Rot-Weiss Essen)
—	DF	GER	Christian Herrmann (from FC 08 Homburg)
—	FW	GER	Rocco Milde (from Dynamo Dresden)

Out:

No.	Pos.	Nation	Player
—	MF	HUN	László Farkasházy (to BVSC Budapest)
—	FW	GER	Andreas Jeschke (to 1. SC Norderstedt)
—	FW	CRO	Kreso Kovacec (to ASV Bergedorf 85)
