= Edin Terzić =

German-Croatian football manager (born 1982)

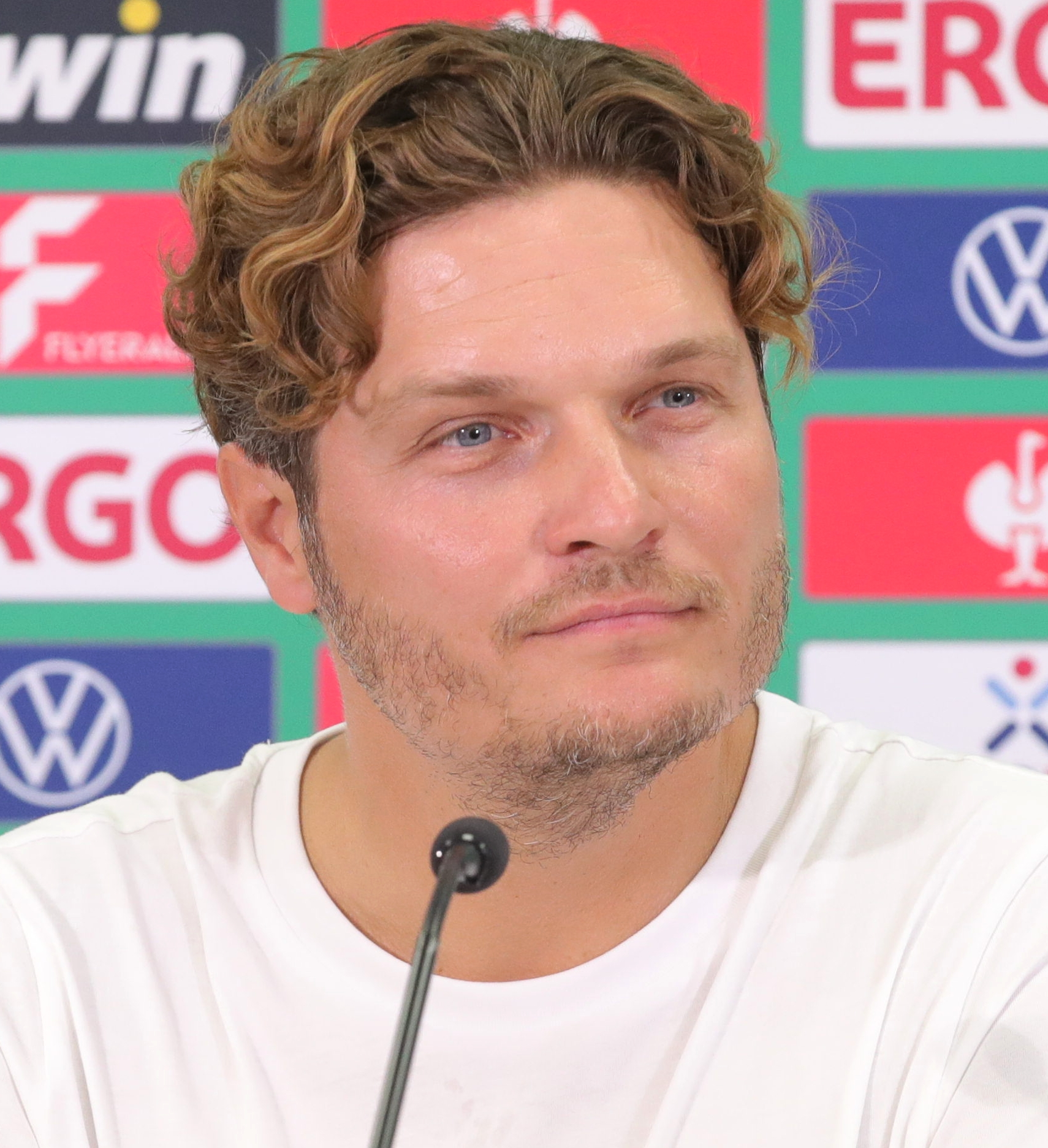
- Terzić in 2023

Personal information
- Date of birth: 30 October 1982 (age 44)
- Place of birth: Menden, West Germany
- Height: 1.84 m (6 ft 0 in)
- Position: Forward

Team information
- Current team: Athletic Bilbao (head coach)

Senior career*
Years	Team	Apps	(Gls)
2003–2004	FC Iserlohn 46/49	30	(1)
2004–2006	Westfalia Herne	30	(3)
2006–2007	SG Wattenscheid 09	33	(2)
2007–2008	Westfalia Herne	34	(8)
2008–2010	BV Cloppenburg	31	(7)
2010–2013	Borussia Dröschede	26	(7)
Total		188	(23)

Managerial career
- 2020–2021: Borussia Dortmund
- 2022–2024: Borussia Dortmund
- 2026–: Athletic Bilbao
- * Club domestic league appearances and goals

Edin Terzić (pronounced [êdiːn těrziːtɕ]; born 30 October 1982) is a German-Croatian professional football coach and former player who is currently head coach of La Liga club Athletic Bilbao.

After a playing career as a forward in the lower leagues of German football, Terzić worked as a scout and youth assistant coach at Borussia Dortmund. Following spells as an assistant to Slaven Bilić, he obtained a UEFA Pro Licence in 2018. He returned to Dortmund as head coach in 2020, winning the DFB-Pokal in 2021 and reaching the UEFA Champions League final in 2024.

== Early years and personal life ==
Terzić was born on 30 October 1982 in Menden, West Germany, to a working-class family that immigrated from Yugoslavia. His Bosniak father hails from Donji Vakuf, Bosnia and Herzegovina and his Croat mother hails from Osijek, Croatia and he holds Croatian citizenship. His older brother Alen also works as a scout for Borussia Dortmund and served as caretaker manager of Borussia Dortmund II during the 2019–20 Regionalliga West season.

Terzić is an alumnus of Ruhr University Bochum where he studied Sports Science. He played at the fourth level of leagues in Germany during his playing career. With SC Westfalia Herne, he won the Westphalia Cup in 2006, scoring twice in a 6–4 final win over Delbrücker SC.

== Coaching career ==
=== Early career ===
Between 2011 and 2013, Terzić worked as a scout and assistant coach in the Borussia Dortmund Academy, reporting to first team manager Jürgen Klopp.

Terzić was an assistant coach of Slaven Bilić at Beşiktaş between 2013 and 2015 and at West Ham United from 2015 to 2017. His collaboration with Bilić started in 2012, when Terzić drafted and delivered a pre-game opponent analysis for Croatia's group stage match against the Republic of Ireland at Euro 2012. Satisfied with the analysis, Bilić invited him to join him as assistant coach at Lokomotiv Moscow, however, the deal eventually fell through. Bilić once again offered Terzić the position at Beşiktaş and Terzić accepted the offer after consulting with Borussia Dortmund. He followed him to West Ham United in 2015, but left the club two years later when Bilić was sacked on 6 November 2017.

Since 2018, Terzić has held UEFA Pro Licence qualification, after graduating from an 18-month long course of The Football Association in England. Fellow graduates included former Chelsea manager Graham Potter as well as former professional players Nicky Butt and Nemanja Vidić.

=== Return to Dortmund ===
Terzić returned to Borussia Dortmund in 2018 as an assistant coach of the first team after the appointment of Lucien Favre as coach. He took charge of the team along with his colleague Manfred Stefes for the 2018–19 encounter against TSG 1899 Hoffenheim, as head coach Favre missed the match due to illness. After Favre was sacked following a 5–1 loss against VfB Stuttgart in December 2020, Terzić was appointed manager until the end of the 2020–21 season. On 13 May 2021, Terzić won the 2020–21 DFB-Pokal with a 4–1 victory over RB Leipzig. He was succeeded on a permanent basis by Borussia Mönchengladbach manager Marco Rose.

Instead of returning to his position as assistant manager for the 2021–22 season, Terzić moved to the newly created position as technical director. After Rose left by mutual consent at the end of the season, Terzić was reappointed manager on a permanent basis, signing a contract until 2025. In the 2022–23 Bundesliga, the team lost out on the league title on goal difference to Bayern Munich on the final day, following a shock 2–2 draw at home to Mainz 05.

In 2023–24, Terzić led Borussia Dortmund to the 5th place, earning direct qualification for the Champions League. He also led the team to the Champions League final in the same season, beating Paris Saint-Germain 2–0 on aggregate in the semi-final. In the final, his club lost 2–0 against Real Madrid. He left Borussia Dortmund by his own request on 13 June 2024.

=== Athletic Bilbao ===
On 5 May 2026, Spanish side Athletic Bilbao of La Liga announced the appointment of Terzić ahead of the 2026–27 season, signing a contract until 2028.

== Managerial statistics ==
As of match played 20 November 2026

Team	From	To	Record								Ref.
Team	From	To	G	W	D	L	GF	GA	GD	Win %	Ref.
Borussia Dortmund	13 December 2020	30 June 2021	32	20	4	8	74	42	+32	62.50	
Borussia Dortmund	23 May 2022	13 June 2024	96	55	20	21	193	111	+82	57.29	
Athletic Bilbao	1 July 2026	Present	13	5	4	4	21	13	+8	38.46	
Total			141	80	28	33	288	166	+122	56.74	—

== Honours ==
=== Player ===
Westfalia Herne

- Westphalia Cup: 2005–06

=== Manager ===
Borussia Dortmund

- DFB-Pokal: 2020–21
- UEFA Champions League runner-up: 2023–24
