= Meinolf =

Meinolf (also Meinulf) is a German masculine given name. It comes from Old High German magan meaning "powerful" (Old Saxon mugan) and Old High German wolf meaning "wolf" (Old Saxon wulf).

== People ==
- Meinolf (saint) (c. 795–857), priest and saint
- Meinolf Amekudzi, German programmer
- Meinulf Barbers (born 1937), German educator
- Meinolf Dierkes (born 1941), German sociologist
- Meinolf Finke (born 1963), German writer and poet
- Meinolf Koch (born 1957), German footballer
- Meinulf von Mallinckrodt (1861–1947), German politician
- Meinolf Mehls (born 1965), German footballer
- Meinolf Mertens (1923–2009), German politician
- Meinolf Michels (1935–2019), German politician
- Meinolf Peters (born 1952), German psychologist and psychotherapist
- Meinolf Schönborn (born 1955), German right-wing extremist
- Meinolf Schulte (born 1948), German footballer
- Meinolf Schumacher (born 1954), German literary scholar and Germanic medievalist
- Meinolf Sellmann, German computer scientist
- Meinolf Stieren (1924–2015), German politician
- Meinolf Vielberg (born 1958), German classical philologist
- Meinolf Wewel (born 1931), German publisher
- Meinolf Zurhorst (born 1953), German film journalist and producer, author

== See also ==
- Ferdinand Joseph Meinolph Anton Maria Freiherr von Lüninck (1888–1944), German landowner, lawyer, military officer and politician
