= Gobelinus Person =

German historian (1358–1421)

Gobelinus Person, sometimes given as Gobelinus Persona, (1358 – 17 November 1421) was a German historian, cleric, priest, music theorist, and monk from Westphalia. He was an important reformer of monastic life in his native land.

== Life ==
He came from either Paderborn or the nearby area, and received his first schooling in that city. As a young man he went to Italy, where he studied theology and canon law, becoming cleric of the papal court, and later an official of the papal exchequer. This was in 1384, under Urban VI, of whom he was always a loyal adherent. This position ceased to be agreeable after the Western Schism disturbed the Roman court. He resigned, was ordained priest in Ancona in 1386, and returned to his native land.

Papal influence secured for him a benefice from the church of the Holy Trinity and later the pastorate of St. Pancratius at Paderborn. He now attended the University of Erfurt, which he entered during the incumbency of its first rector (1392–1394). It is deduced from this that he was still pursuing his scientific studies. Wilhelm von Berg, who had been chosen Bishop of Paderborn (1400–1415), selected Gobelinus for his court chaplain and induced him to enter his service. The latter availed himself of his position to work for the improvement of religious life and particularly for the restoration of discipline in the cloisters which had drifted into an habitual disregard of their rules.

The monastery of nuns at Böddeken near Paderborn where the abbess alone remained was changed into a convent for men and given over to the Augustinians. Not content with this, he undertook in spite of great difficulties to reform the Benedictine Abbey of Abdinghof, at Paderborn. But the opponents of his policy resisted the interference of the bishop, who transferred to Bielefeld that branch of the diocesan administration of which Gobelinus was a part. The latter had already in 1405 given up his parish church at Paderborn, owing to certain differences with the municipal authorities. The bishop appointed him dean of the collegiate church of Bielefeld. The Archbishop of Cologne, Dietrich von Mörs, who in 1415 received the See of Paderborn gave the dean authority to reform the religious life, not only in the monastery of Bielefeld but also in other institutions, a mission Gobelinus fulfilled.

Due to old age and illness, he resigned in 1418 and moved back to the monastery of Böddeken. He did not don the monk's habit, but spent the remaining years of his life in the monastic solitude.

Gobelinus wrote a treatise on music theory, Tractatus musicae scientiae, which he completed in 1417. It was lost, possibly destroyed, during World War II. It contained nine chapters which encompassed a thorough discussion of modes, plainchant, intervals, and consonance and dissonance among other topics.

== Works ==
Gobelinus was also an historian. He wrote a history of the world entitled: Cosmidromius, hoc est Chronicon unversale complectens re ecclesiae et reipublicae. This work he continued up to the year 1418. The Cosmidromius was selected by Paul Scheffer-Boichorst as his basis and starting-point when he set out to restore the Annales Patherbrunnenses, lost annals of the twelfth century which had been looked upon as an authority in its particular field.

Another work of Gobelinus was his Vita Meinulphi, a biography of Meinolf, a canon of the cathedral chapter of Paderborn in the first half of the ninth century, and the founder of the Böddeken monastery.

The Cosmidromius of Gobelinus was first published by Meibom (Frankfort, 1599) in the Scriptores rerum Germanicarum; Max Jansen prepared a new edition (Münster, 1900). The Vita Meinulphi may be found in the Acta Sanctorum of the Bollandists, Oct. III, 216 sqq.
