= Sophie Rogge-Börner =

German writer, feminist and nationalist (1878–1955)

- Born: Pia Sophie Börner; 24 July 1878; Warendorf, Westphalia, Kingdom of Prussia
- Died: 7 February 1955 (aged 76); Düsseldorf, North Rhine-Westphalia, West Germany
- Employer: The German Fighter (1933–1937)
- Political party: German National People's Party; National Socialist Freedom Movement
- Children: 1

Pia Sophie Rogge-Börner (24 July 1878 – 7 February 1955) was a German writer and journalist (who wrote under the pseudonym Christa Hoch). She was also an ethnic feminist and nationalist. She campaigned for gender equality and the social emancipation of Aryan women in an ideology rooted in scientific racism. She was a member of the German National People's Party (DNVP) then the National Socialist Freedom Movement (NSFB). Her writing was heavily influenced by Nordic mythology and she edited The German Fighter magazine from 1933 to 1937.

== Biography ==
Rogge-Börner was born in 1878 in Warendorf, Westphalia, Kingdom of Prussia. She grew up in garrison cities as her father was a Prussian Army officer. She worked as secondary school teacher before becoming a writer. In 1910, she married a German surgeon.

Rogge-Börner became a member of the German National People's Party (German: Deutschnationale Volkspartei, DNVP) in 1919. She left the DNVP to join the National Socialist Freedom Movement (German: Nationalsozialistische Freiheitsbewegung, NSFB) and the German Women's Order (German: Deutschen Frauenorden, DFO).

Rogge-Börner was an influential right-wing writer in the 1920s, sometimes writing under the pseudonym Christa Hoch. She published political pamphlets advocating for gender equality and the social emancipation of Aryan women. She was a proponent of the image of a "new Nordic woman," who "participated fully in the economic and political life of their people" side by side with their men, but who was distinct from the modern woman of the Weimar Republic. This equality and emancipation for Aryan women would allow for their participation in the emerging Nazi German state.

From its foundation in April 1933, Rogge-Börner edited the monthly The German Fighter (German: Die Deutsche Kämpferin) magazine in Berlin, until it was banned by the Gestapo in 1937. During the magazines publication run, it had an average circulation of 2,600 copies. Alongside her editorship, she wrote for the magazine on ideas of German "feminist utopias" and continued the themes of her earlier writing, such as "virulent xenophobia," "racism" and "elitist feminism."

After World War II, Rogge-Börner's later writing was heavily influenced by Nordic mythology. Her works were included on the "list of literature to be discarded" [de] (German: Liste der auszusondernden Literatur) by the German Administration for Public Education (German: Deutsche Verwaltung für Volksbildung, DZVV) of the Soviet occupation zone in Germany.

Rogge-Börner moved to Düsseldorf, North Rhine-Westphalia, West Germany, in October 1948. She died in Düsseldorf in 1955, aged 76.
