= Maximilian Schulze Niehues =

German footballer

Personal information
- Date of birth: 11 November 1988 (age 38)
- Place of birth: Warendorf, West Germany
- Height: 1.85 m (6 ft 1 in)
- Position: Goalkeeper

Youth career
- Warendorfer SU
- TuS Freckenhorst
- –2007: Preußen Münster

Senior career*
Years	Team	Apps	(Gls)
2007–2008	Preußen Münster	5	(0)
2008–2011	Fortuna Düsseldorf II	69	(0)
2011–2024	Preußen Münster	271	(0)
- * Club domestic league appearances and goals

Maximilian Schulze Niehues (born 11 November 1988) is a German former professional footballer who played as a goalkeeper.
