= Hoetmar =

- Ortsteil of Warendorf
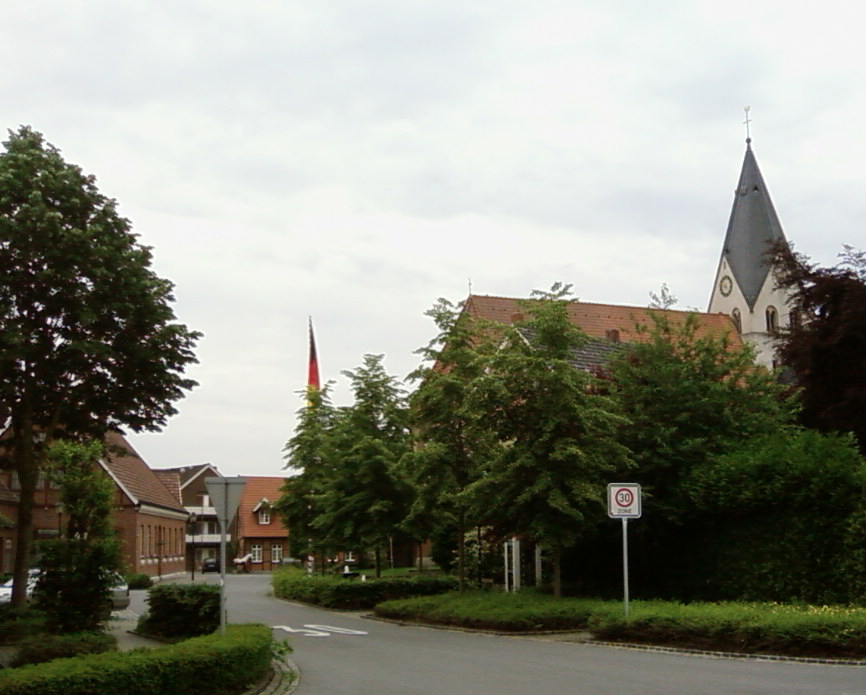
- The village centre and St Lambert Parish Church

- Coat of arms
- Interactive map of Hoetmar
- Location within Germany Location within North Rhine-Westphalia
- Coordinates: 51°52′15″N 7°54′35″E
- Country: Germany
- State: North Rhine-Westphalia
- Admin. region: Münster
- District: Warendorf
- Town: Warendorf

Population (2017)
  - Total: 2,291
- Time zone: UTC+01:00 (CET)
  - Summer (DST): UTC+02:00 (CEST)
- Postal codes: 48231
- Dialling codes: 02585
- Vehicle registration: WAF

Hoetmar (German pronunciation: [ˈhoːtmar]) is a village that is located in North Rhine-Westphalia, Germany. More specifically, Hoetmar is nestled in between the towns of Sendenhorst, Everswinkel and Ennigerloh in agriculturally oriented Münsterland. Since 1974 it is under the administration of the town of Warendorf.

== History ==
Through the Middle Ages, the village name changed frequently. It was referred to as "Otomar" in 851, as "Hotnon" in 1241, in 1281 as "Hoetman", in 1299 as "Hoetmere", and eventually as "Hoetmar".

Most German place names describe the natural surroundings at the time of settlement. Also the name "Hoetmar" once described a natural landscape. Linguists have found the meaning of the name "Hoetmar" by deriving it back to "Otomar". They broke the name into two parts. First "ot" stands for a swamp or marsh, and secondly "mar" is Low German for a stagnant body of water. Therefore, the name "Otomar" or "Hoetmar" indicates a rolling swamp or marsh-like landscape.

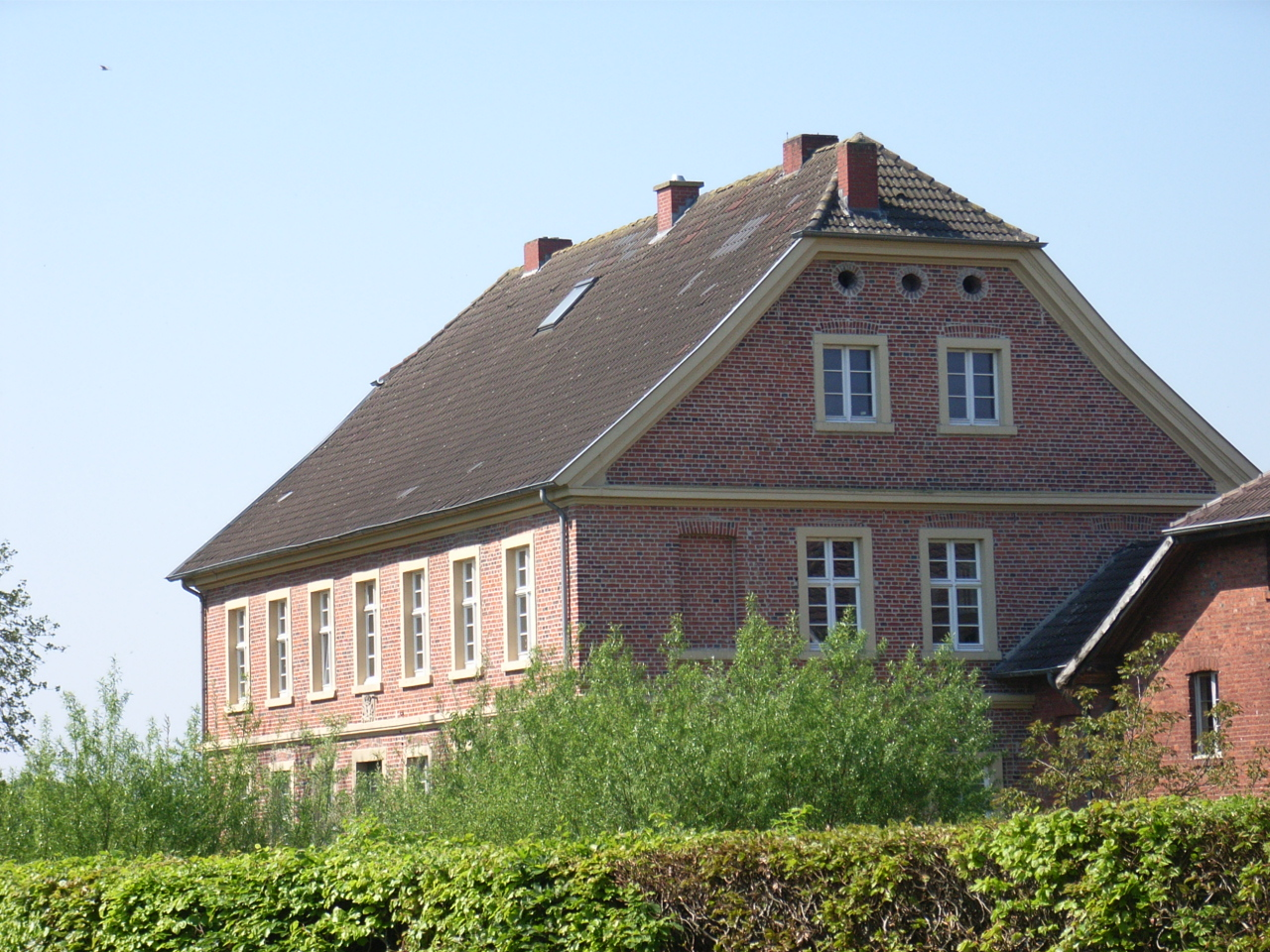
Hoetmar Manor today

As far back as written records can be found, Hoetmar had belonged to the Count von Westfalen, the later Count of Arnsberg. In 1247 Count Conrad I of Rietberg inherited all properties north of the river Lippe, obviously Hoetmar as well. The first feudal lords of Hoetmar Manor became knights of Hoetmar. In 1449 the heiress to the manor and family of Hoetmar married Series von der Hegge. Through this marriage Hoetmar was transferred to the family von Ketteler, and around 1700 it was transferred again to the Count von Westerholt, who still owns Hoetmar Manor today.

Hoetmarer farmers were subjects to various lordships, among these were the Freckhorster monastery, the Marienfelder monastery, the St Mauritz monastery in Münster, the cathedral chapter and monastery of Niessing in Münster. Serfdom was abolished under French in the year 1808. Thereafter release fees were paid by farmers to their former lords.

Up until 1802, Hoetmar was a part of the Prince-Bishopric of Münster. In 1802 and 1803 the Prince-Bishopric of Münster came under Prussian rule. In 1806, the French under Napoleon I won control over Münsterland. Hoetmar and its western neighbour, Westkirchen, were joined as one mairie or municipality. The Hoetmarer Mayor G.W. Becker was selected as Mayor of the newly formed Hoetmar-Westkirchen. When French rule was broken in 1813, all of Münsterland went back under Prussian rule.

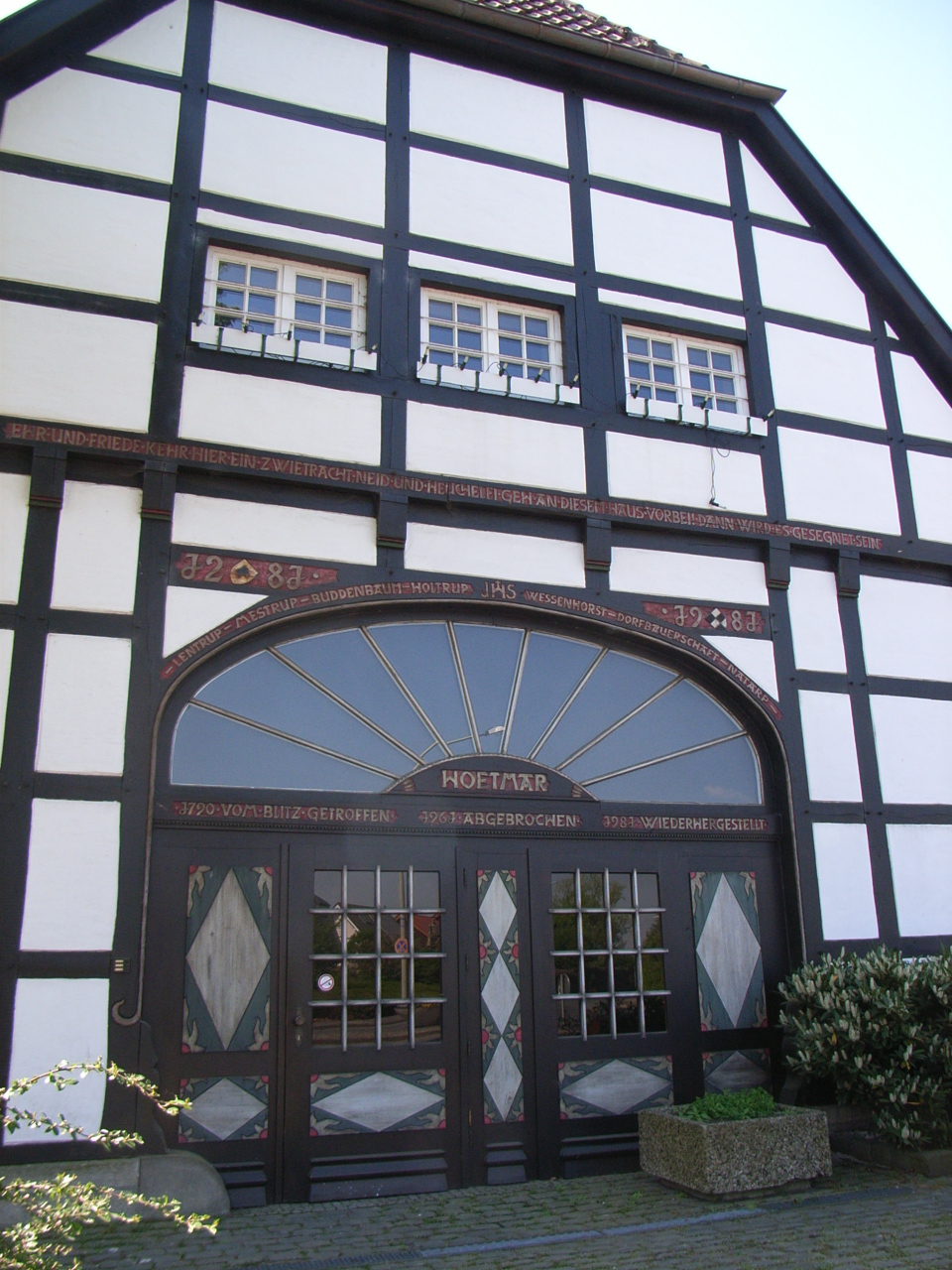
Pictured is the library of St Lambert Parish Church. It was originally built in 1287, but after a lightning strike around 1700 and being partially knocked down in 1960s, it was rebuilt and renovated in 1987.

Since the early 15th century, Hoetmarer farmers had joined in a cooperative. Originally the Hoetmarer Commons were uncultivated land that was commonly used by the adjacent farmyard owners. The beneficiaries were the members of the farming co-op. Shares of the Commons were held by farmers in the communities of Freckenhorst, Everswinkel, Enniger and Neuwarendorf. Six-foot-high walls along the boundaries of the Commons marked the border to privately owned fields and pastures. Co-op beneficiaries closely guarded the Commons boundaries.

Around the year 1645, a war between Hoetmar and the northern community of Freckenhorst broke out. One reason for this war was that the Hoetmarer farmer had let their livestock wander into the Freckenhorster zone. Out of irritation, the Freckhorsters gathered the wandering livestock onto their own private property. Obviously the Hoetmarer farmers would not accept this without a battle. Several farmers who rode off to Freckenhorst were accompanied by footmen who were armed with pitchforks and shovels. By the end, both sides counted large numbers of casualties.

Towards the end of the 17th century, crimes within the Commons had increased and so talk of dividing up the Hoetmarer Commons became louder and louder. Between the years 1794 and 1796, preparation for such a division was made. In 1822, the royal General Commission in Münster decided to split the Commons up. It took until 19 March 1839 to completely divide the Commons up into private hands.

The First World War brought great unemployment and inflation to Hoetmar and the rest of Germany. Therefore, it was easy for Hitler to convince Germany's desperate citizens of the ideologies of his NS party. During the Second World War several people lost their homes. These people came to Hoetmar looking for work and place to stay through the War. On 31 March 1945, American troops marched from Sendenhorst towards Hoetmar. Many villagers hoisted whites flags on the church tower, houses, inns, and on the school.

After the Second World War, several families who had lost their homes in both western and eastern regions of the former German Empire were put up in farms and within the Village. Slowly with the help of the new arrivals, peace and prosperity returned to Hoetmar.

In 1969, after the German government reorganized the municipalities, Hoetmar and Freckenhorst became one community. In 1975, both German municipalities and districts were reorganized. At this time, Freckenhorst-Hoetmar became part of Warendorf, each as an individual component locality.

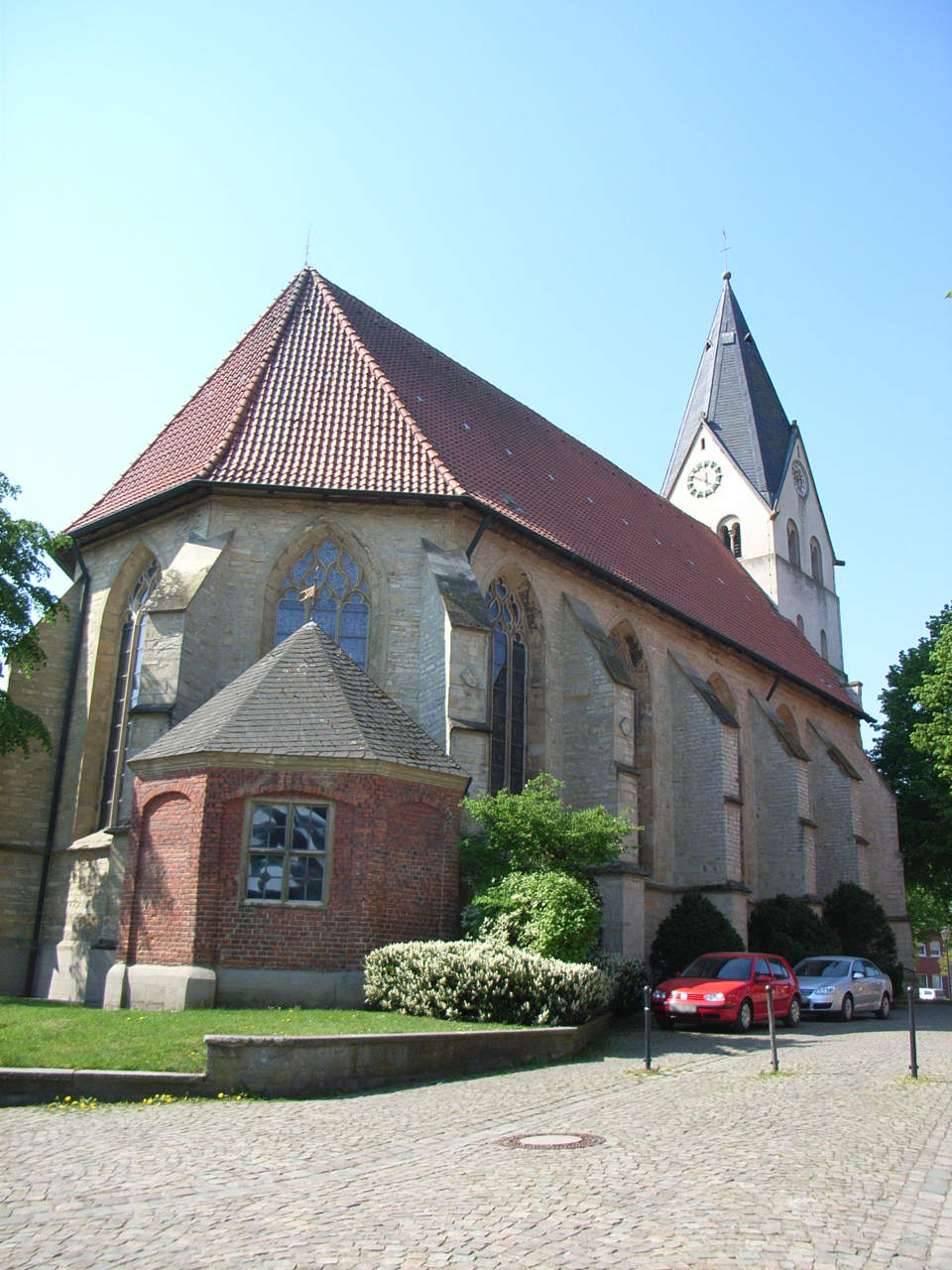
St Lambert Parish Church

== St Lambert Parish ==
In 1281, St Lambert Parish of Hoetmar was founded by Count Conrad I of Rietberg. The parish included the whole village and its surrounding farming areas. However, the Catholic parish in Hoetmar no longer operates independently. In 2005, the parish of St Lambert Hoetmar and St Boniface in Freckenhorst joined to form one parish with two parish churches and one chapel.

The parish church can be dated back to the founding of the parish thanks to the tower substructure. The late Gothic church hall was built between 1510 and 1513. An inscription above the north-west entrance supports this fact. Abbess Maria von Tecklenburg (1473–1527) contributed greatly to the completion of the church. As a form of gratitude for her help, her crest and that of Series von der Hegge, who married into Hoetmar Manor, are chiselled in the stone above the northern entrance, which is now bricked up. The church bell tower originally had a gable roof. The tower was extended and given a new roof in 1898. Three bells are accommodated in the tower. The oldest of these dates back to 1482 and dedicated to Virgin Mary.

== Coat of arms ==
The Coat of Arms resembles the origins of Hoetmar. The golden eagle represents Count Conard I of Rietberg who founded the Catholic parish. The green palm branch is a symbol of martyrs. It stands for Saint Lambert of Maastricht who is the patron saint of the Hoetmar parish.

== See also ==
- Sendenhorst
- Everswinkel
- Ennigerloh
