= Warendorf =

- Town
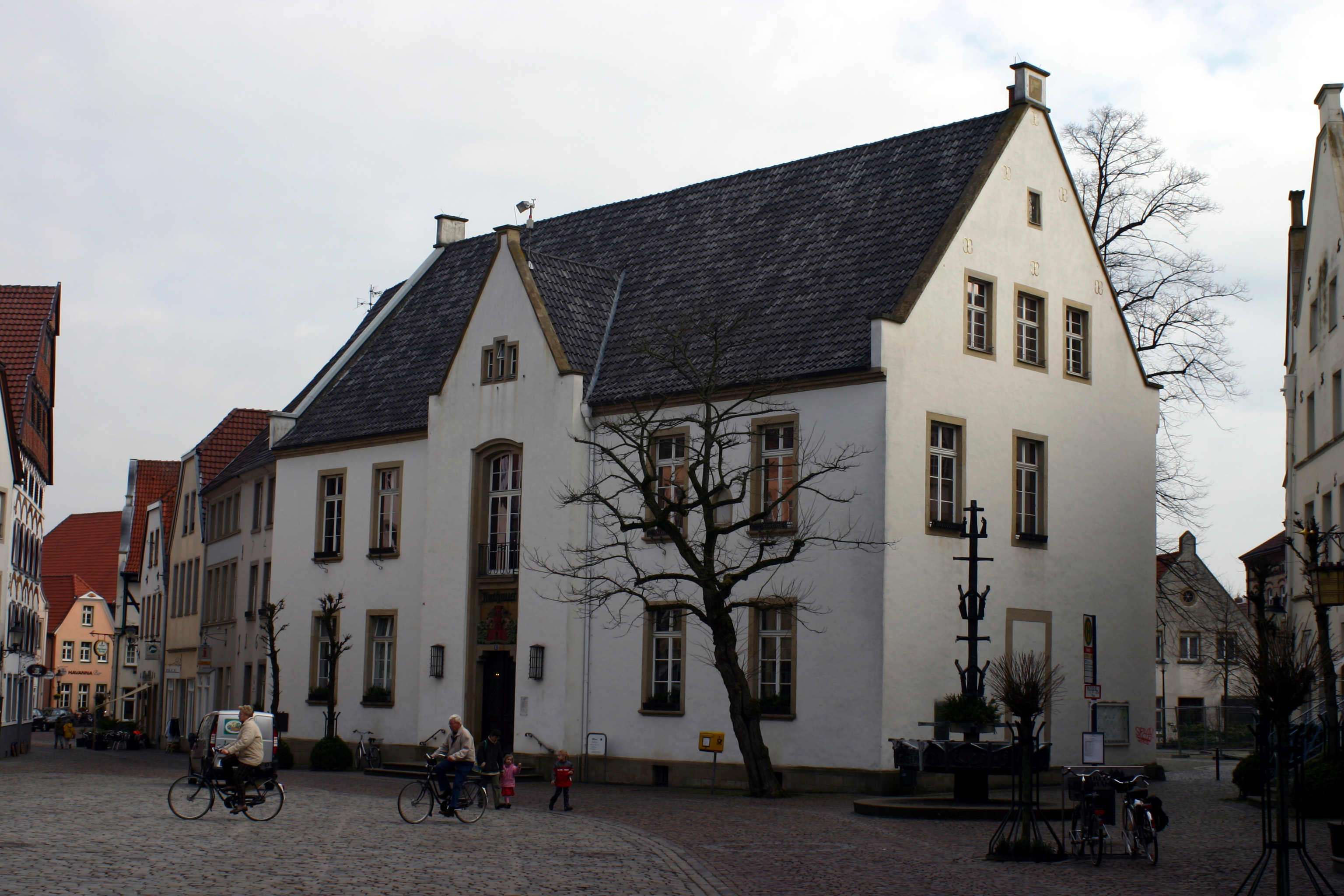
- Townhall in Warendorf

- Flag Coat of arms

- Location of Warendorf within Warendorf district
- Interactive map of Warendorf
- Location within Germany Location within North Rhine-Westphalia
- Coordinates: 51°57′14″N 7°59′36″E
- Country: Germany
- State: North Rhine-Westphalia
- Admin. region: Münster
- District: Warendorf

Government
  - Mayor (2020–25): Peter Horstmann

Area
  - Total: 176.88 km^{2} (68.29 sq mi)
- Elevation: 57 m (187 ft)

Population (2025-12-31)
  - Total: 37,705
  - Density: 213.17/km^{2} (552.10/sq mi)
- Time zone: UTC+01:00 (CET)
  - Summer (DST): UTC+02:00 (CEST)
- Postal codes: 48231
- Dialling codes: 02581
- Vehicle registration: WAF, BE
- Website: www.warendorf.de

Warendorf (German pronunciation: [ˈvaːʁəndɔʁf], Westphalian: Warnduorp) is a town in North Rhine-Westphalia, Germany, and capital of Warendorf District.

The town is best known today for its well-preserved medieval town centre, for horse-riding, and the opportunities it provides for cycling. Bicycles are such a common means of transport in the area that many cycle paths have been built, even alongside main roads outside the town.

== History ==
The origin and name Warendorf date back to the ancient Saxon royal court of Warintharpa (“the village on the embankment”), which was most likely already formed in 700 BC. Between the years of 1197 and 1201 Warendorf became a town. During this time, among the already established parish, which belonged to the “old church” (St. Laurentius), a new, second parish with the “new church” (Marienkirche) was formed just west of the town centre. The medieval records of the founding of Warendorf are missing, along with several records and documents in Münster. These were all destroyed during the rule under the Anabaptists. Bishop Hermann II von Katzenelnbogen (Bishop 1173–1202) also contributed to the founding of the town.

In 1224 the first recorded mention of Warendorf as a civitas, which is a civil and municipal community, was made. The wealth of Warendorf grew increasingly and developed more and more into an important trading town, since it is situated favourably between Münster and Oelde. Apart from that Warendorf profited from the production and selling of linen. The wealthy citizens settled on the market square and in the streets, Emsstrasse and Oststrasse. Still today these areas of the town are most prominent in the townscape of Warendorf. In contrast, the poorer part of population lived in simple houses with dirt floors. These bad living conditions lead to the epidemics and illnesses.

In 1404 there was a great fire in Warendorf, during which along with 600 houses also the “old church” (St. Laurentius) and the town hall with all its inventory were destroyed.

In 1533 the Anabaptist movement spread in Warendorf and also in Münster. This movement took over rule in the town for one week in October 1534, until it was ended by a short occupation by Bishop Franz von Waldeck. Four Anabaptist apostles and the Warendorf Anabaptist movement leaders were sentenced to death and were executed by a sword on the market square. As a deterrent the bodies of the “apostles” were laid on the four gates into the town. As a result of this, Warendorf lost its town rights and regained them again in 1542. Free elections of the local council were first held in 1556 under Bishop Franz von Waldeck's successor. The Anabaptist movement continued up into the 17th century in the background without any serious danger for the town or church.

Between 1627 and 1632 loss of the town rights occurred during religious battles of the Thirty Years' War. The first mention of the “Fettmarkt” dates back to 1657. This event remained an important funfair with a flea market and livestock market still today. In 1741 another great fire broke out, which resulted in the destruction of the “new church” (Marienkirche) and 332 houses. Because many tradesmen had to move further, and so Warendorf suffered economic loss.

In 1802 Warendorf came under the Prussian sovereignty. The once blossoming town impoverished. In 1826 the establishment of the Westphalian state stud farm in Warendorf was succeeded by the Prussian stud administration. In 1887 the railroad line Münster – Warendorf – Rheda-Wiedenbrück was opened. In 1937 barracks were built just north of Warendorf. Today, the sport school of the German army is also located in these barracks. On 1 January 1975, a reformation of the municipalities was carried out. This reformation integrated the communities of Einen and Milte, and the town of Freckenhorst into the town of Warendorf. Also during this reformation, the larger district of Warendorf (district) was formed by combining the districts of Warendorf and Beckum. Warendorf became seat of the district government.

== Geography ==
Warendorf is situated on the Ems river in the eastern part of the Münsterland area. This area of the Westphalian Lowland is characterized by agriculture. Because of its varying landscape of fields, pastures, small forests and hedgerows, people compare this area to a park.

The closest large city is Münster, which is located 30 kilometres (19 miles) west of Warendorf. Other large cities in the area are Osnabrück, approx. 40 kilometres (25 miles) to the north, Bielefeld, approx. 45 kilometres (28 miles) to the east, and Hamm, approx. 35 kilometres (22 miles) to the south.

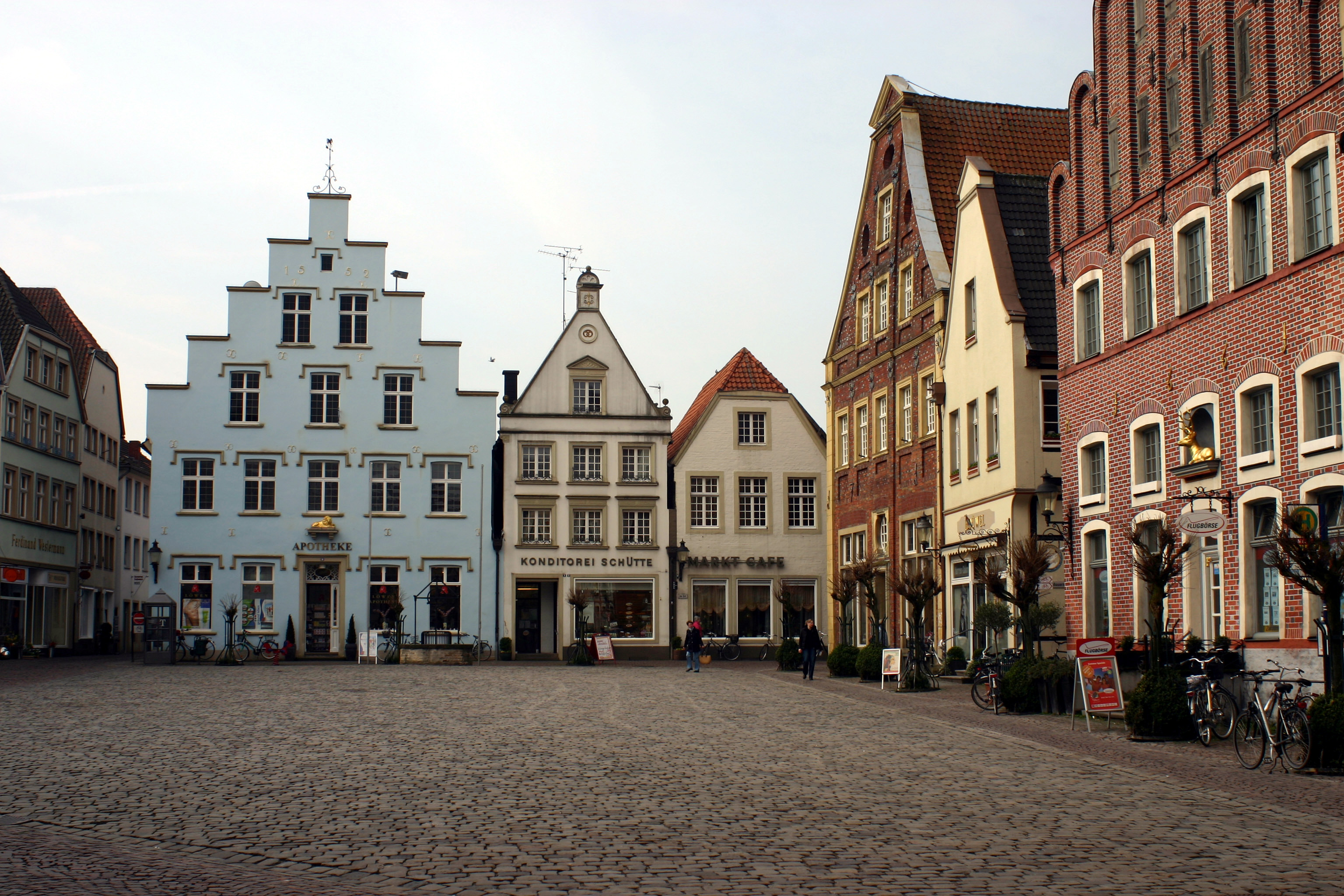
The Market Square, Warendorf

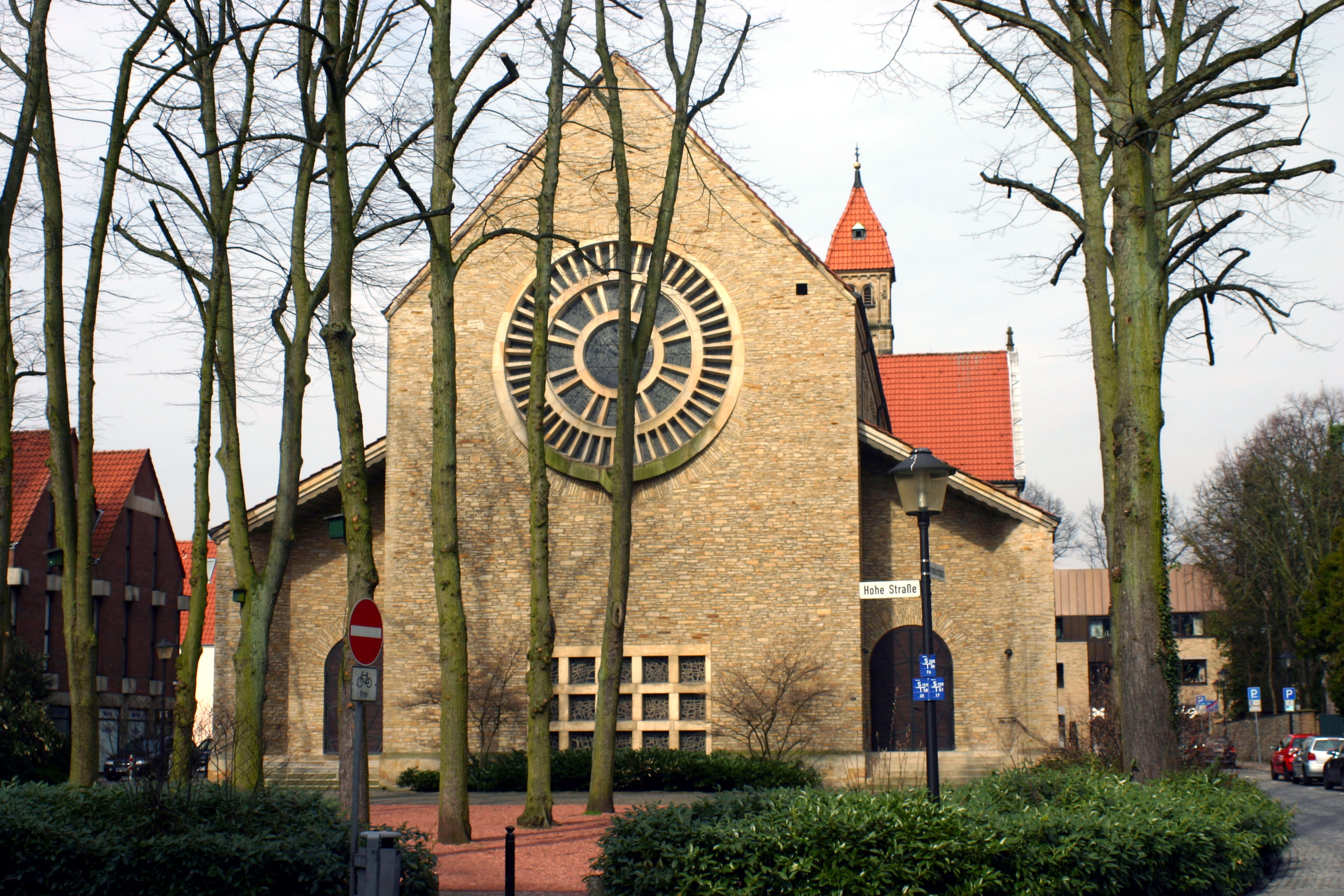
Saint Mary's Church, Warendorf

=== Component localities ===
Warendorf consists of 6 component localities:

- Warendorf
- Einen
- Müssingen
- Freckenhorst
- Hoetmar
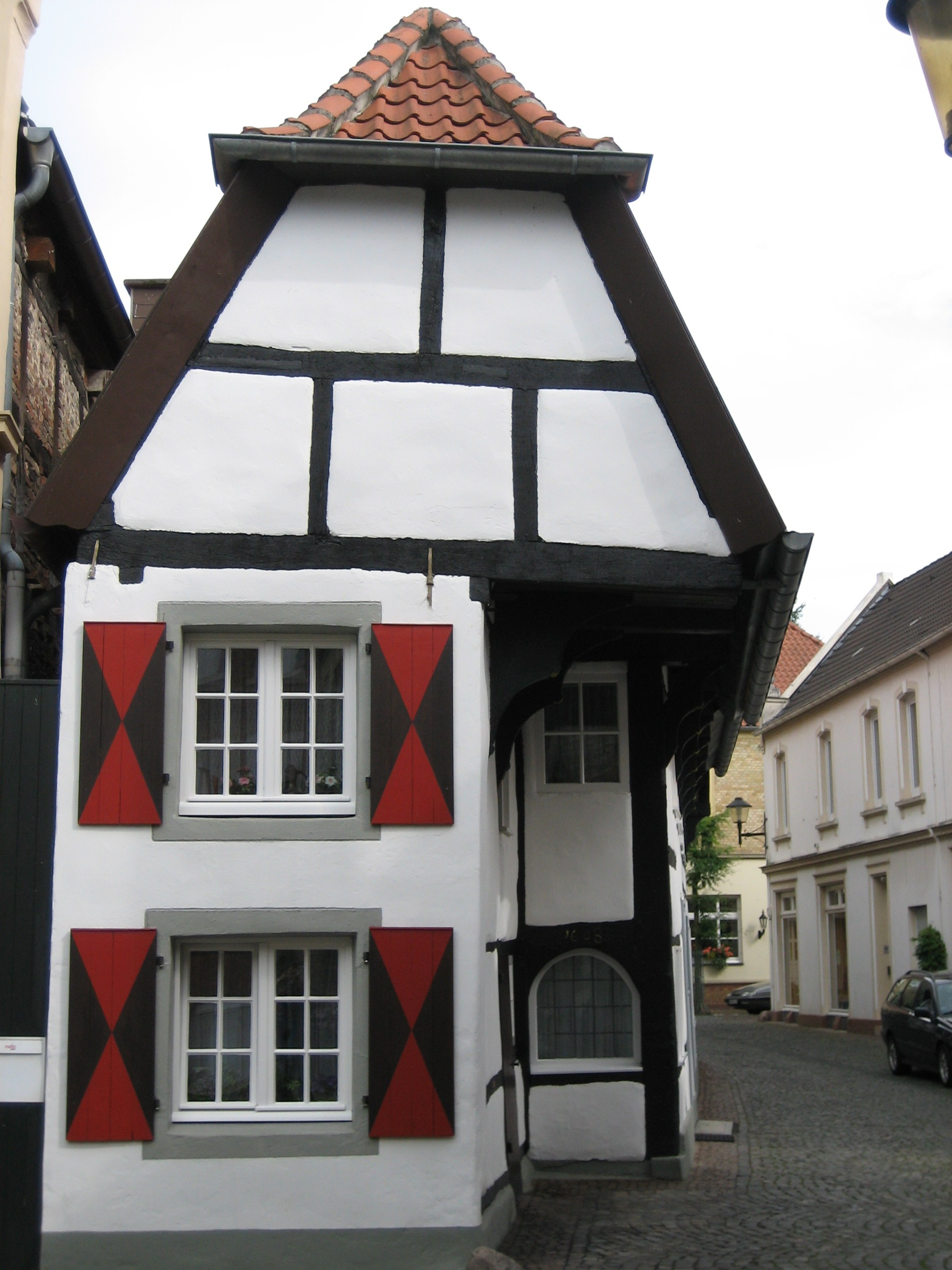
- A house of 1608, Warendorf
  Milte

== Population ==
Historical population

Year	Pop.	±% p.a.
1965	28,089	—
1970	29,715	+1.13%
1975	32,281	+1.67%
1980	33,149	+0.53%
1985	33,499	+0.21%
1990	35,092	+0.93%
1995	36,991	+1.06%

Year	Pop.	±% p.a.
2000	38,688	+0.90%
2005	38,717	+0.01%
2010	38,134	−0.30%
2015	37,249	−0.47%
2020	37,173	−0.04%
2025	37,705	+0.28%

Source: Landesdatabank Nordrhein-Westfalen

== Arts and culture ==
Warendorf has hosted several international events, such as the world skydiving championships, riding events, and the national swimming championships. A notable annual event in Warendorf is the celebration on 15 August of the Feast of the Assumption of the Blessed Virgin Mary (Mariä Himmelfahrt).

== Sports ==
North Rhine-Westphalia's "Landgestüt" (stud farm) and the National Olympic Committee for horse-riding are both located in Warendorf.

The Bundeswehr Sports School, the German armed forces physical education center, is also located in Warendorf.

== Education ==
- Mariengymnasium
- Gymnasium Laurentianum
- Augustin Wibbelt Gymnasium

== Notable people ==
- Bernhard Sprengel (1899–1985), chocolate manufacturer and art patron (Sprengel Museum, Hannover)
- Elisabeth Grümmer (1911–1986), soprano, died in Warendorf
- Paul Spiegel (1937–2006), former president of the Central Council of Jews in Germany
- Andreas Ridder (born 1964), footballer
- Klaus Welle (born 1964), Former General secretary of the EU Parliament
- Maximilian Schulze Niehues (born 1988), footballer
- Sophie Rogge-Börner (1878–1955), German writer, feminist and nationalist

== Twin towns – sister cities ==
Warendorf is twinned with:

- Barentin, France
- (France) Pavilly, France
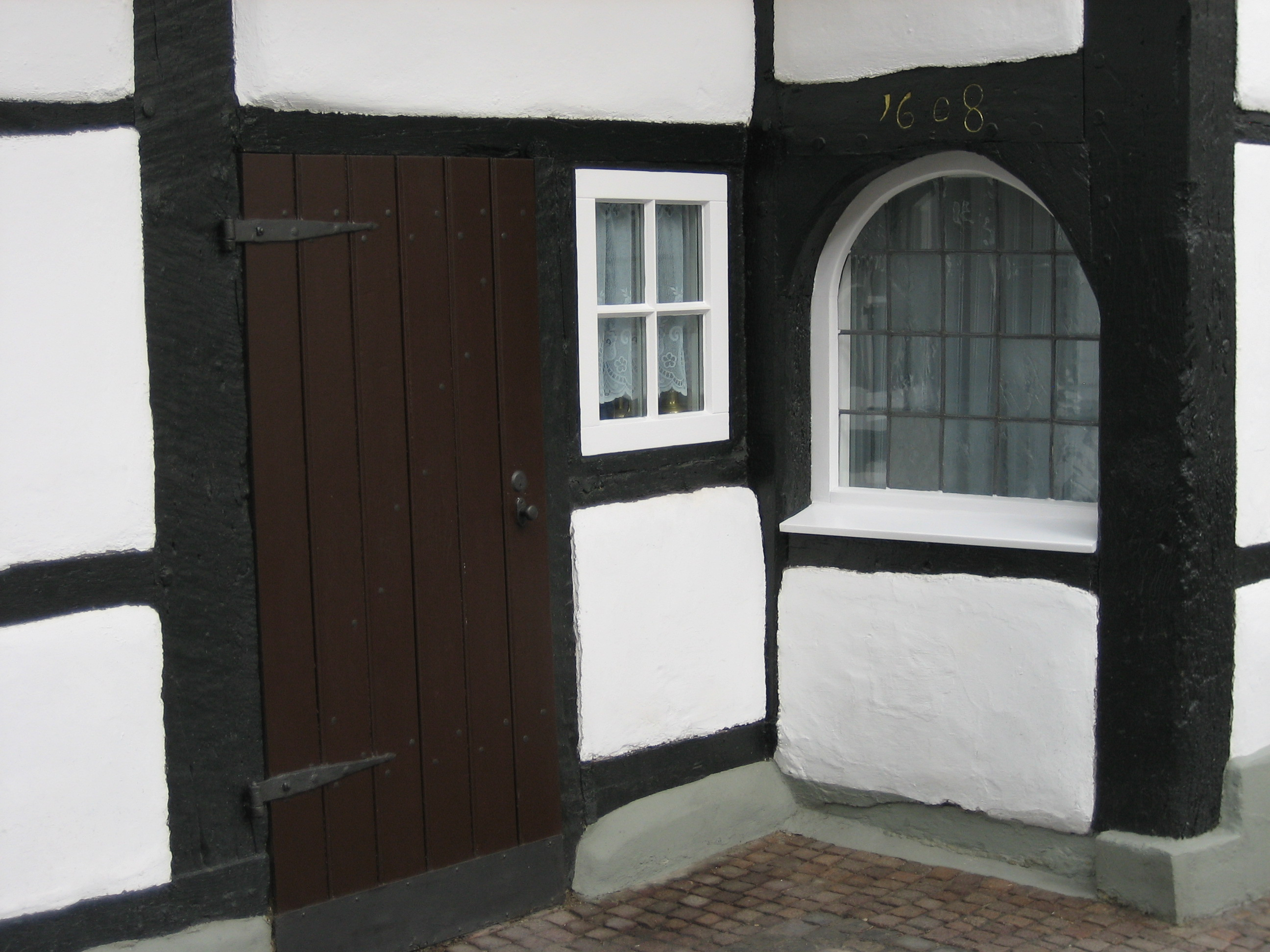
  Detail of the house of 1608, Warendorf
- Oleśnica, Poland
- Petersfield, England, United Kingdom
