= Rolf Schafstall =

German football manager (1937–2018)

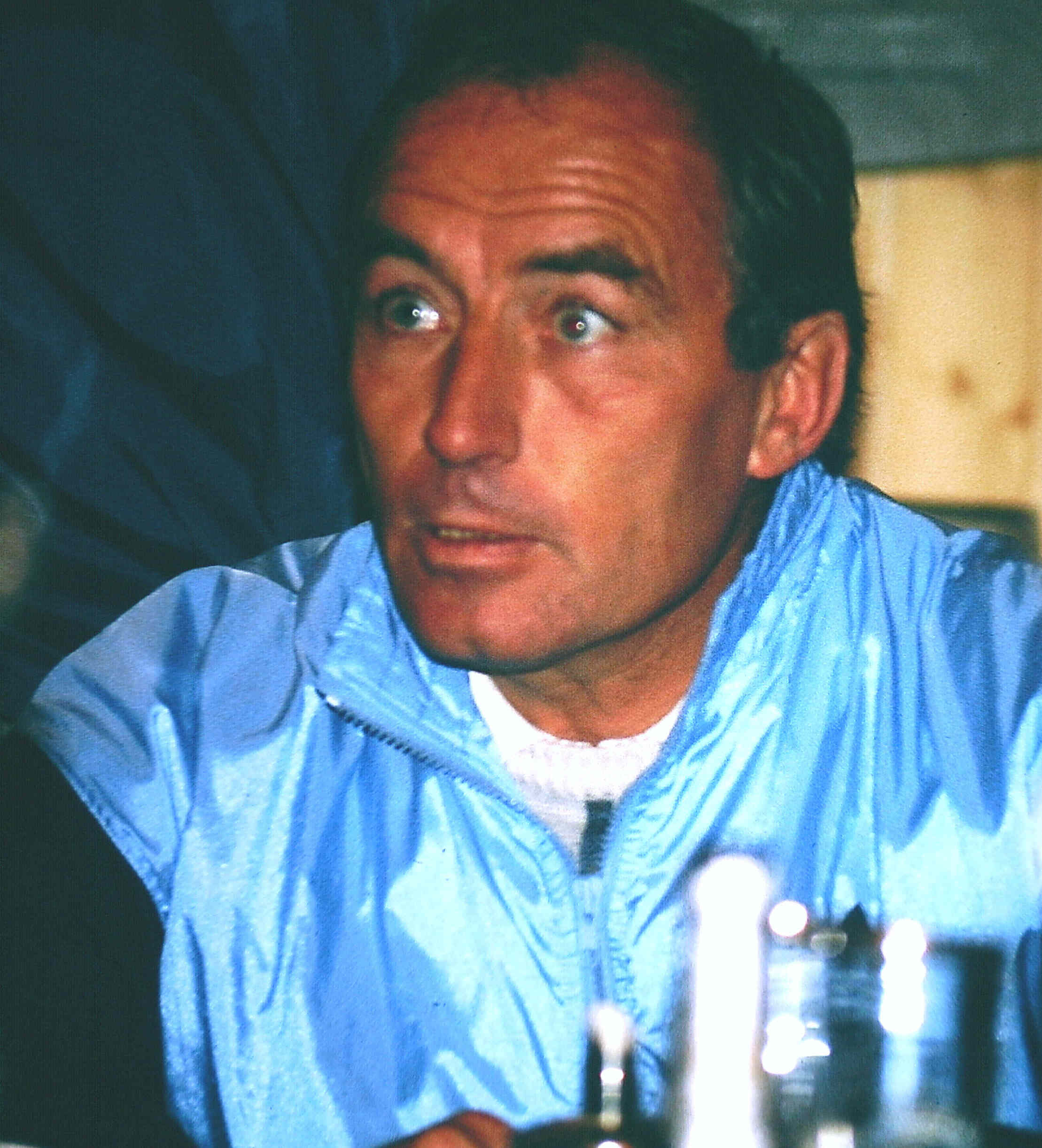
- Schafstall with Schalke 04 in 1986

Personal information
- Full name: Rudolf Schafstall
- Date of birth: 22 February 1937
- Place of birth: Duisburg, Germany
- Date of death: 30 January 2018 (aged 80)
- Place of death: Krefeld, Germany
- Positions: Defender; midfielder

Youth career
- 1950–1955: SF Hamborn 07

Senior career*
Years	Team	Apps	(Gls)
1955–1963	SF Hamborn 07		
1963–1969	SSV Reutlingen		

Managerial career
- 1976: MSV Duisburg
- 1977–1978: Karlsruher SC
- 1978–1979: MSV Duisburg
- 1979–1981: Rot-Weiss Essen
- 1982–1986: VfL Bochum
- 1986–1987: Schalke 04
- 1987–1989: Bayer 05 Uerdingen
- 1989–1990: VfL Osnabrück
- 1991: VfL Bochum
- 1991–1992: Fortuna Düsseldorf
- 1992: Stahl Brandenburg
- 1992–1993: Stuttgarter Kickers
- 1993–1995: Hannover 96
- 1999: Dynamo Dresden
- 2001: VfL Bochum
- * Club domestic league appearances and goals

Rudolf 'Rolf' Schafstall (22 February 1937 – 30 January 2018) was a German football coach and a player. He was born in Duisburg, Germany.

Schafstall died on 30 January 2018 in Krefeld, Germany at the age of 80.
