= Meinolf Sellmann =

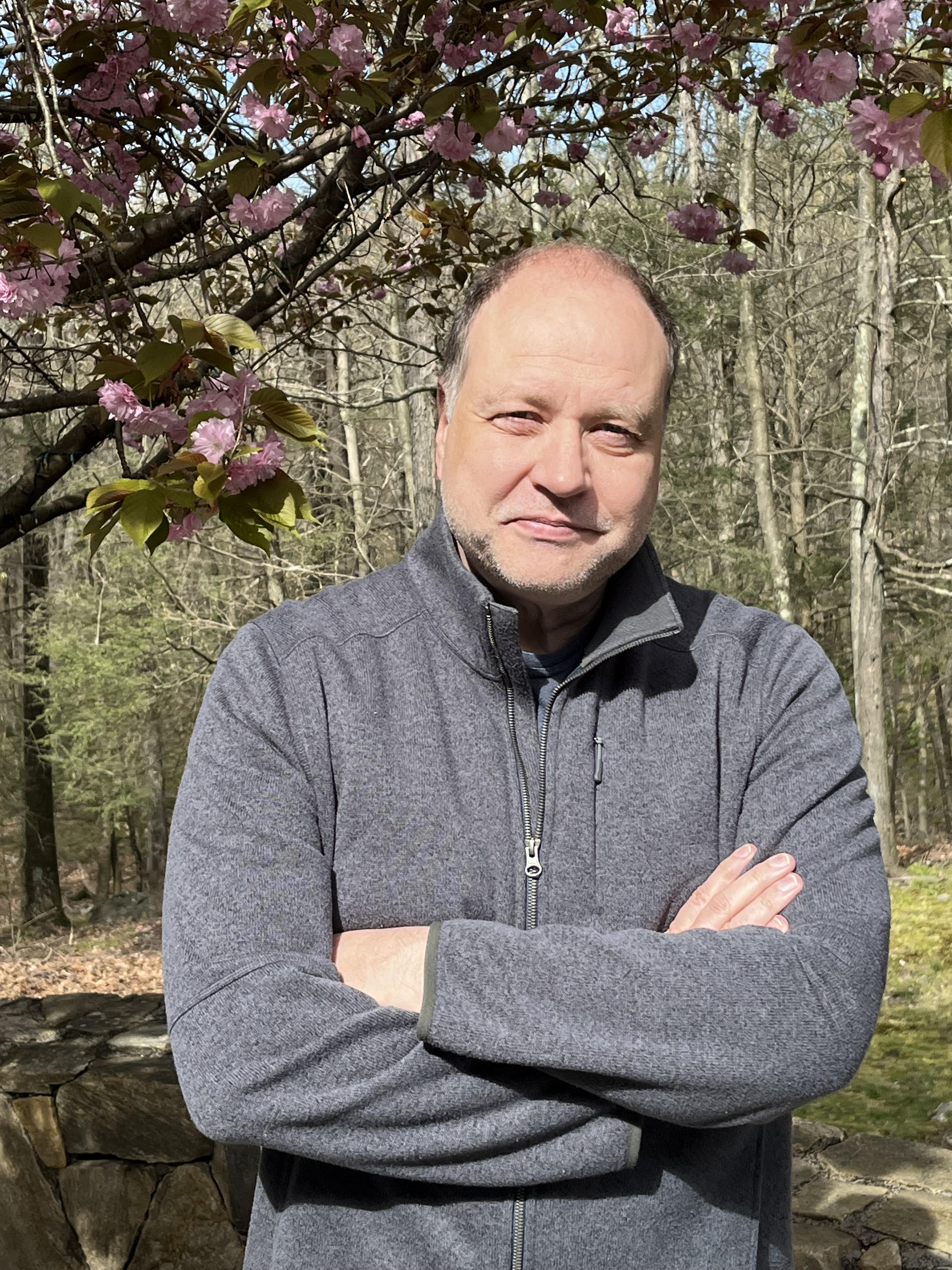
- Education: Paderborn University
- Awards: NSF Career Award 2007
- Scientific career
- Fields: Algorithms, Operations Research and Artificial Intelligence for Combinatorial optimization
- Workplaces: InsideOpt
- Doctoral advisor: Burkhard Monien

Meinolf Sellmann (born in Holzminden, Germany) is a German computer scientist, best known for algorithmic research, with a special focus on self-improving algorithms, automatic algorithm configuration and algorithm portfolios based on artificial intelligence, combinatorial optimization, and the hybridization thereof.

He received a doctorate degree (Dr. rer. nat.) in 2002 from Paderborn University (Germany) and is now CEO of InsideOpt, an optimization company he founded in 2021. Prior to this current engagement, he was Director for Network Optimization at Shopify, Lab Director for machine learning and knowledge discovery at the global research center of General Electric, held a position as senior manager for data curation in the cognitive computing department at IBM Research, Assistant Professor at Brown University, and Postdoctoral Scholar at Cornell University.

His honors include the Prize of the Faculty of the University of Paderborn (Germany) for his doctoral thesis, an NSF Career Award in 2007, two Gold Medals at the SAT Competition 2011, a winning Solver at the 2012 SAT Challenge, two Gold Medals at the SAT Competition 2013, seventeen winning solvers at the 2013-2016 MaxSAT Evaluations, and two first places at the 2021 AI for TSP Competition.

He also received IBM Outstanding Technical Innovation Awards in 2013 and 2014, an A-level Business Accomplishment 2015, and won the Shopify Fulfillment Network Sharktank competition in 2021. He was invited Keynote Speaker at Gecco 2022, Anziam 2017, Techkriti 2017, Optimization Days 2017, OR 2017, AAAI 2015 and served on the IEEE technical board for emerging technologies (2012-2015), the AAAI education board (since 2016), as Program Chair of IAAI 2021 and IAAI 2022, Cluster Chair on the Future of Computing at Informs 2017, Conference Chair of CP 2007, conference-wide Workshop Chair of AAAI 2008, and as Program Chair of CPAIOR 2013 and LION 2016 and 2023.
