= Gerrit Plomp =

Dutch footballer

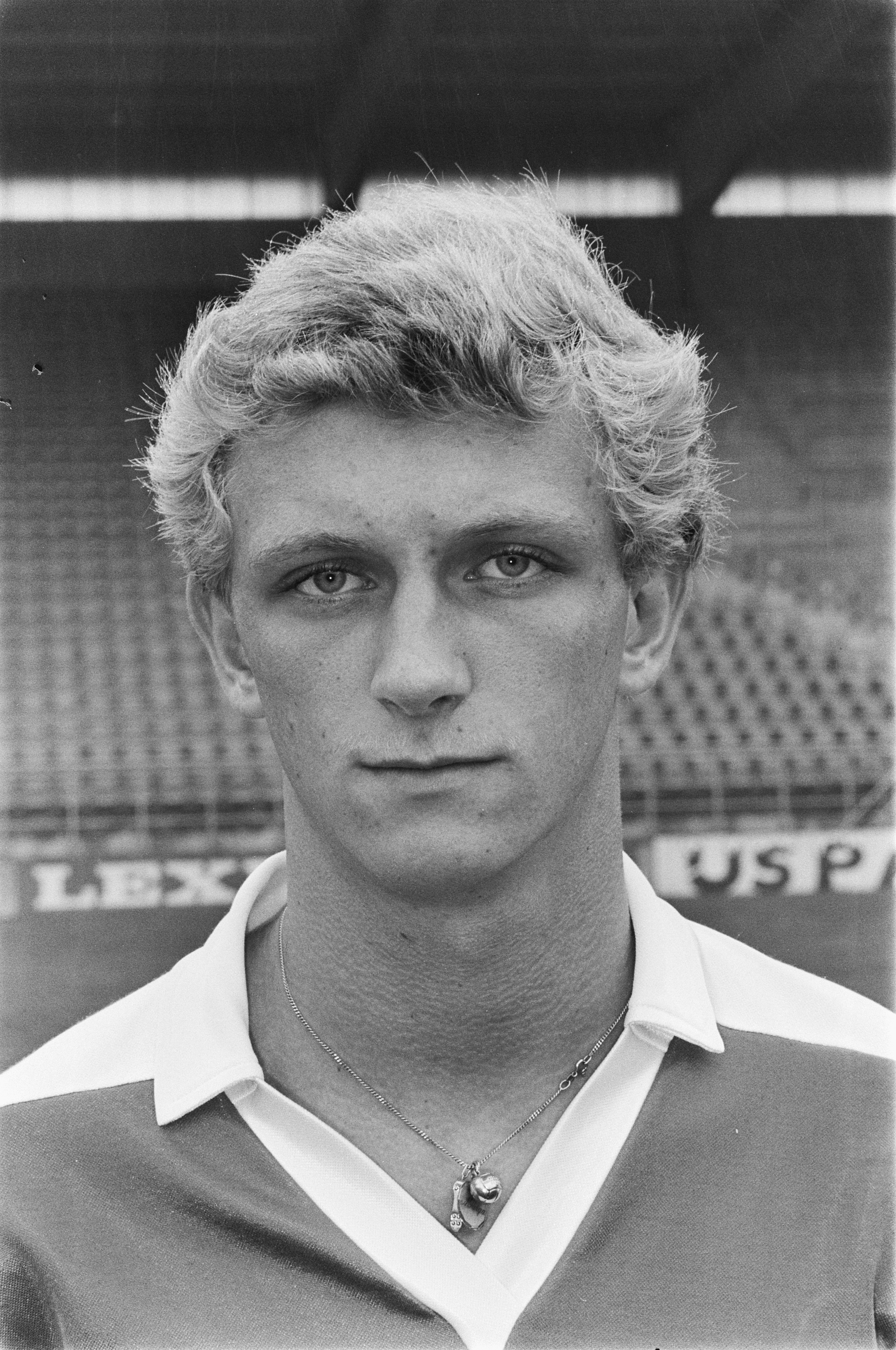

Personal information
- Full name: Gerrit Plomp
- Date of birth: 27 June 1963 (age 63)
- Place of birth: Utrecht, Netherlands
- Height: 1.85 m (6 ft 1 in)
- Position: Sweeper

Senior career*
Years	Team	Apps	(Gls)
1983–1989	FC Utrecht	156	(16)
1989	VfL Bochum	10	(0)
1990–1992	Feyenoord	12	(0)
1992	Fortuna Sittard	13	(0)
- * Club domestic league appearances and goals

Gerrit Plomp (born 27 June 1963) is a retired Dutch football defender.

== Honours ==
FC Utrecht

- KNVB Cup: 1984–85
