= Andreas Jeschke =

German footballer

Personal information
- Date of birth: 6 September 1966 (age 60)
- Height: 1.72 m (5 ft 8 in)
- Position: Forward

Senior career*
Years	Team	Apps	(Gls)
1985–1987	Hummelsbüttler SV		
1987–1988	VfB Lübeck		
1988–1989	VfL Bochum	0	(0)
1989–1992	1. SC Norderstedt		
1992–1995	FC St. Pauli	10	(0)

Managerial career
- 2014: TBS Pinneberg
- * Club domestic league appearances and goals

Andreas Jeschke (born 6 September 1966) is a German former professional footballer who played as a forward.
