= Andreas Ridder =

German footballer

Personal information
- Full name: Andreas Ridder
- Date of birth: 27 September 1964 (age 62)
- Place of birth: Warendorf, West Germany
- Height: 1.85 m (6 ft 1 in)
- Position: Defender

Senior career*
Years	Team	Apps	(Gls)
1985–1989	Arminia Bielefeld	88	(5)
1989–1991	VfL Bochum	26	(1)
1991–1995	Arminia Bielefeld		
- * Club domestic league appearances and goals

Andreas Ridder (born 27 September 1964) is a German former football defender.
