= Meinolf Mehls =

German footballer

Personal information
- Full name: Meinolf Mehls
- Date of birth: 24 July 1965 (age 61)
- Place of birth: Bochum, West Germany
- Height: 1.82 m (6 ft 0 in)
- Position: Midfielder

Senior career*
Years	Team	Apps	(Gls)
1987–1991	VfL Bochum II		
1990	→ VfL Bochum	1	(0)
1991–1992	SpVgg Erkenschwick	29	(0)
1992–	Sportfreunde Siegen		
- * Club domestic league appearances and goals

Meinolf Mehls (born 24 July 1965) is a retired German football midfielder.
