= Elard Ostermann =

German footballer

Personal information
- Full name: Elard Ostermann
- Date of birth: 15 October 1968 (age 58)
- Height: 1.80 m (5 ft 11 in)
- Position: Midfielder

Senior career*
Years	Team	Apps	(Gls)
1989–1991	VfL Bochum	27	(1)
1995	SV Lurup		
1996	Hamburger SV	9	(0)
1996	Hannover 96		
1997	SV Lurup		
1997–1998	Lüneburger SK		
1999	Hamburger SV II		
1999–2000	1. SC Norderstedt		
- * Club domestic league appearances and goals

Elard Ostermann (born 15 October 1968) is a German former professional footballer who played as a midfielder.
