= Manfred Stefes =

German footballer

Personal information
- Date of birth: 28 March 1967 (age 59)
- Place of birth: Korschenbroich, West Germany
- Height: 1.73 m (5 ft 8 in)
- Position: Defender

Team information
- Current team: Fortuna Düsseldorf (assistant)

Senior career*
Years	Team	Apps	(Gls)
1988–1992	Borussia Mönchengladbach	46	(1)
1992–1993	Fortuna Düsseldorf	6	(0)
1993–1997	Germania Teveren	18	(0)
Total		70	(1)

Managerial career
- 1999–2000: Borussia Mönchengladbach (interim manager)
- 2000–2003: Borussia Mönchengladbach (Assistant)
- 2003–2004: Borussia Mönchengladbach II
- 2005–2008: MSV Duisburg (assistant)
- 2008: MSV Duisburg II
- 2009–2017: Borussia Mönchengladbach (assistant)
- 2018–2020: Borussia Dortmund (assistant)
- 2022–: Fortuna Düsseldorf (assistant)
- * Club domestic league appearances and goals

Manfred Stefes (born 28 March 1967) is a former German footballer who played as a defender and currently the assistant coach of Borussia Dortmund.
