= Stefan Kohn =

German footballer

Personal information
- Date of birth: 9 October 1965 (age 61)
- Place of birth: Ellwangen, West Germany
- Height: 1.78 m (5 ft 10 in)
- Position: Striker

Youth career
- DJK Ellwangen
- VfR Aalen
- Stuttgarter Kickers

Senior career*
Years	Team	Apps	(Gls)
1984–1985	Bayer Leverkusen	0	(0)
1985–1986	Arminia Bielefeld	33	(14)
1986–1987	Bayer Leverkusen	18	(2)
1987–1989	Hannover 96	49	(12)
1989–1991	VfL Bochum	55	(17)
1991–1993	Werder Bremen	44	(10)
1993–1994	1. FC Köln	28	(7)
1995	→ Schalke 04 (loan)	12	(5)
1995–1997	1. FC Köln	38	(6)
1997–1998	Nice	25	(8)
1998–1999	SG Wattenscheid 09	3	(0)
Total		305	(81)
- * Club domestic league appearances and goals

Stefan Kohn (born 9 October 1965) is a German former professional footballer who played as a striker.

== Honours ==
Werder Bremen

- UEFA Cup Winners' Cup: 1991–92
- Bundesliga: 1992–93

Individual

- Goal of the Year (Germany): 1986
