= Zambiasi =

Zambiasi is a surname. Notable people with the surname include:

- Ben Zambiasi (born 1956), American football player
- Fábio Zambiasi (1966–2022), Brazilian footballer
