= Fábio Zambiasi =

Brazilian footballer (1966-2022)

Personal information
- Date of birth: 2 July 1966
- Place of birth: Nova Bréscia, Brazil
- Date of death: 7 February 2022 (aged 55)
- Place of death: Posse Generoso, Soledade, Brazil
- Position: Defender

Senior career*
Years	Team	Apps	(Gls)
1991–1993	Grêmio Santanense		
1993–1994	1. FC Saarbrücken	14	(0)
1995–1997	Coritiba		
1998–1999	América-SP		
1999	Avaí		
2000	América-SP		
2001	Iraty		
- Portuguesa Santista
2003	São José-RS		
- * Club domestic league appearances and goals

Fábio Zambiasi (2 July 1966 – 7 February 2022) was a Brazilian professional footballer who played as a defender for Coritiba, scoring 18 goals in 144 games between 1995 and 1997. Zambiasi died on 7 February 2022, at the age of 55.

== Career ==
Having started his career with Grêmio Santanense in his native Brazil, Zambiasi moved to Germany to sign with 2. Bundesliga team 1. FC Saarbrücken in 1993. On returning to Brazil, Zambiasi played for a number of teams before settling in Soledade, where he continued to play amateur football.
