= Nova Bréscia =

Municipality of Rio Grande do Sul, Brazil

- Municipality
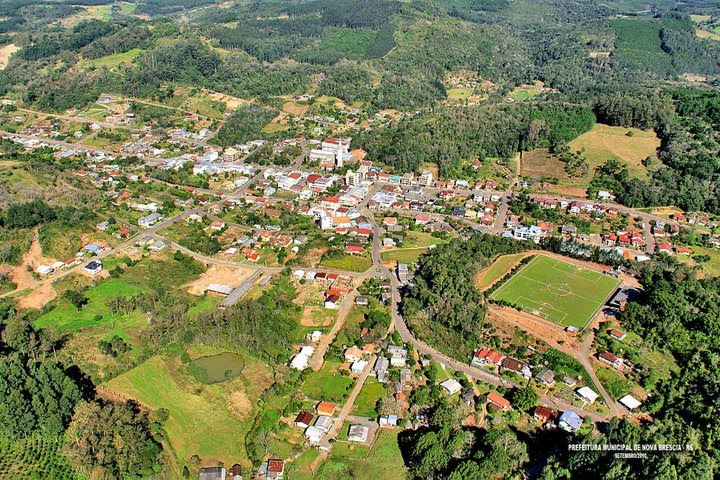
- View of Nova Bréscia

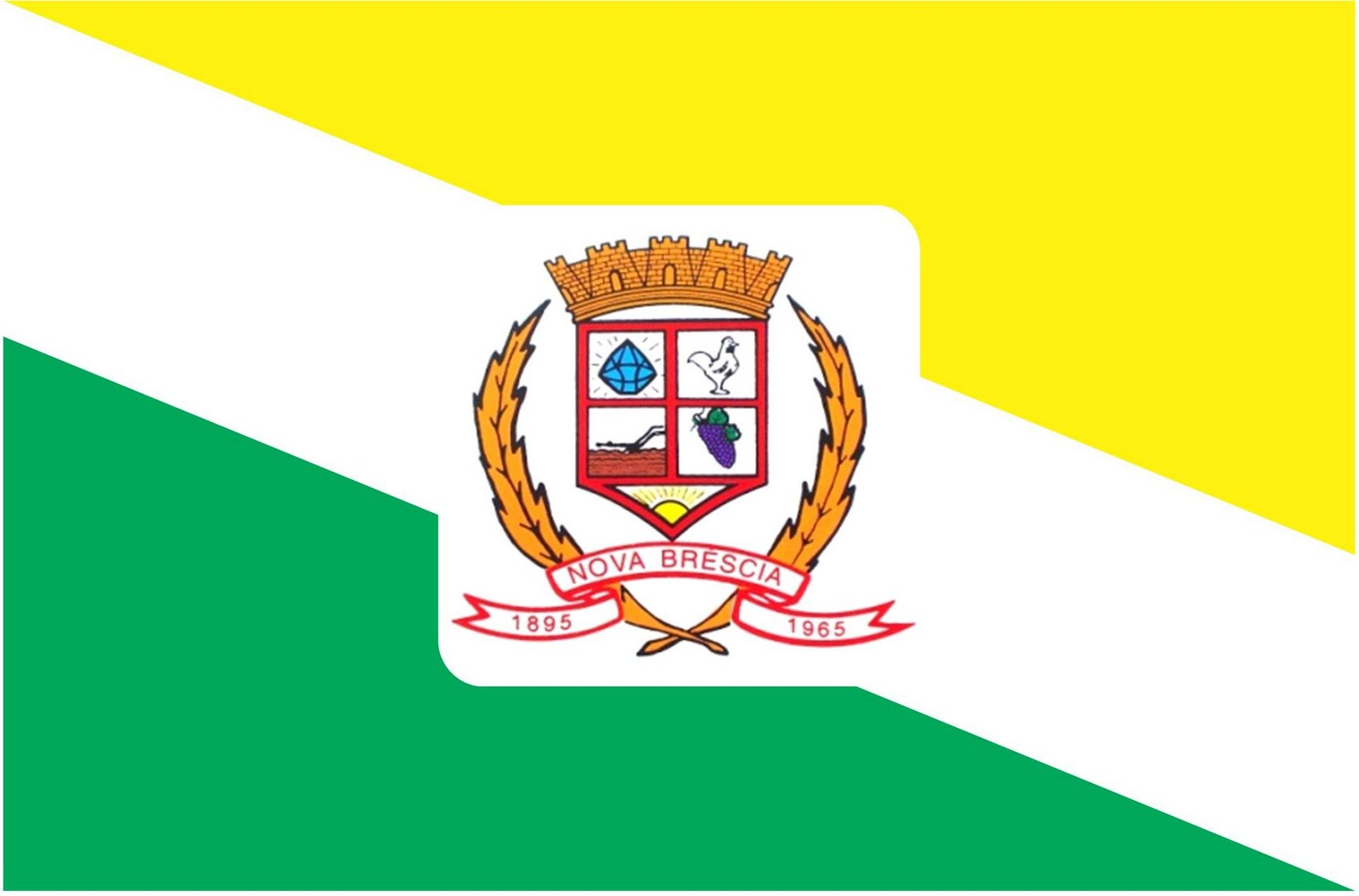
- Flag Coat of arms

- Location within Rio Grande do Sul

- Location in Brazil
- Coordinates: 29°12′S 52°02′W
- Country: Brazil
- State: Rio Grande do Sul

Population (2022)
  - Total: 3,044
- Time zone: UTC−3 (BRT)

Nova Bréscia is a municipality in the state of Rio Grande do Sul, Brazil, settled by Italian immigrants from Brescia. Its estimated population in 2020 was 3,337 inhabitants. It has an area of 102.183 km^{2} (39.453 sq mi).

Every two years the city hosts the Festival of Lie, where each person tries to tell the biggest lie, provided that it can leave the audience in doubt of its veracity.

The city also purports to have some of the best Brazilian barbecue with a statue dedicated to barbecue in the city center.

== Gallery ==
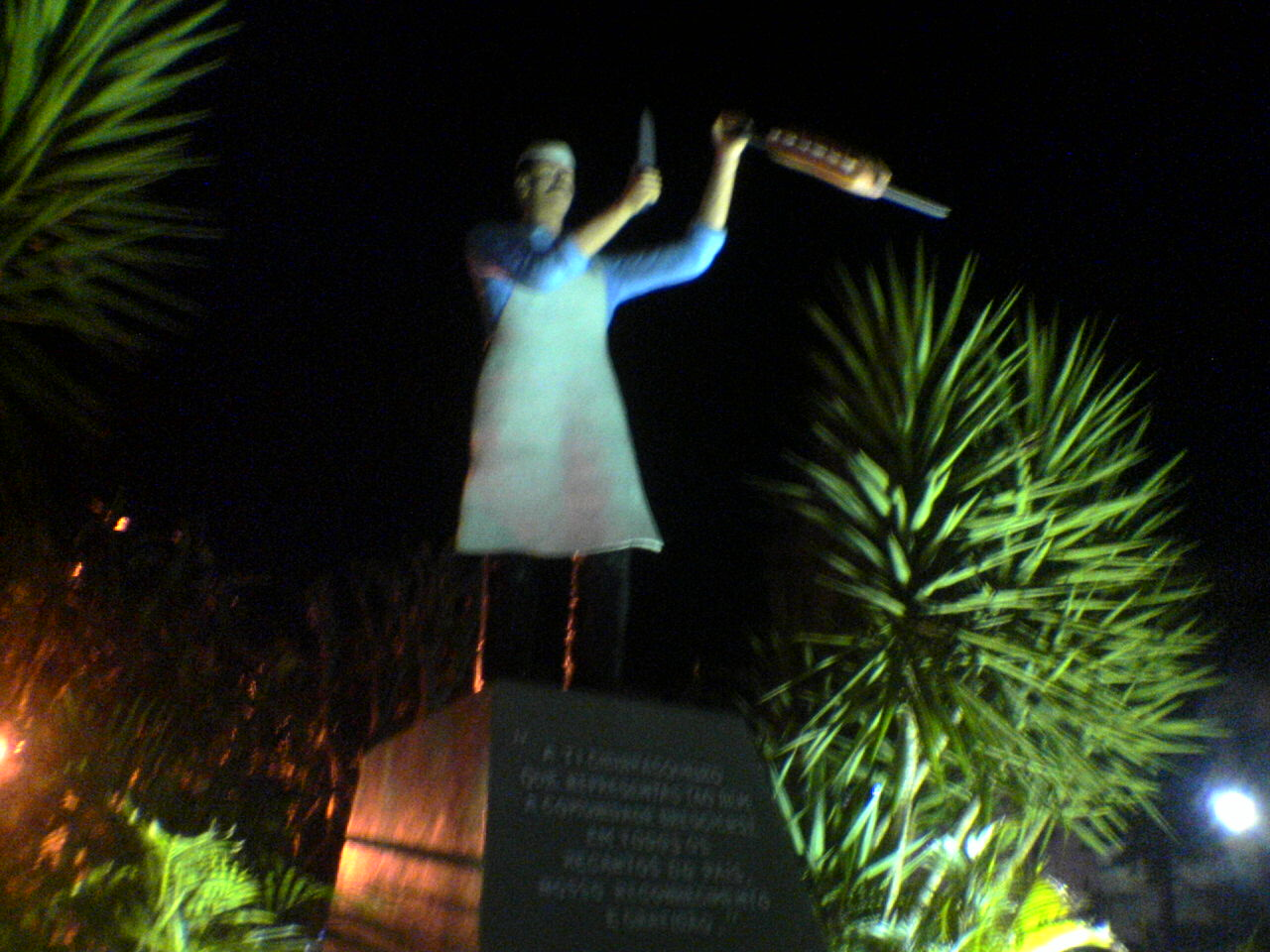
Monument to Barbecue

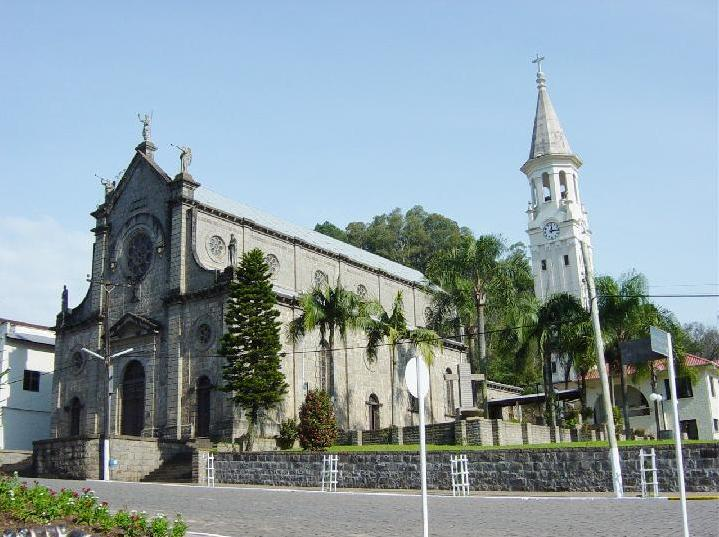
Paróquia São João Batista

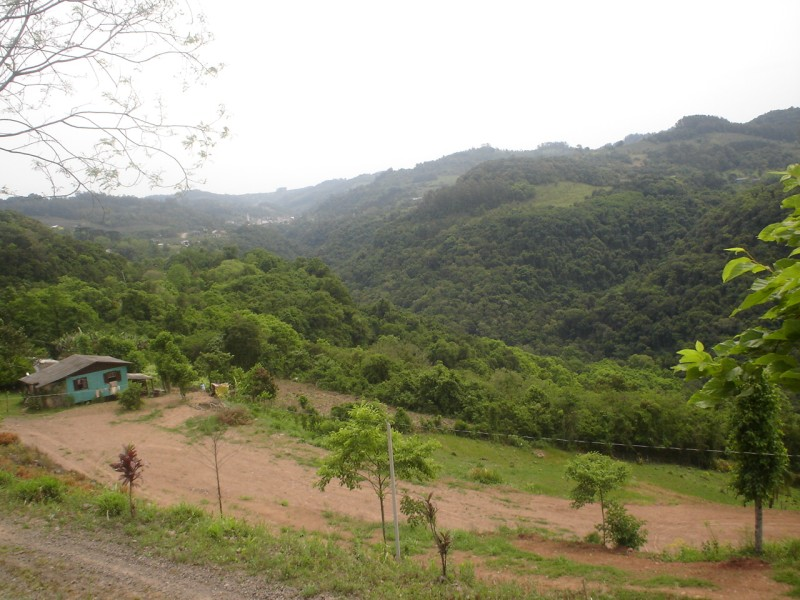
Hills

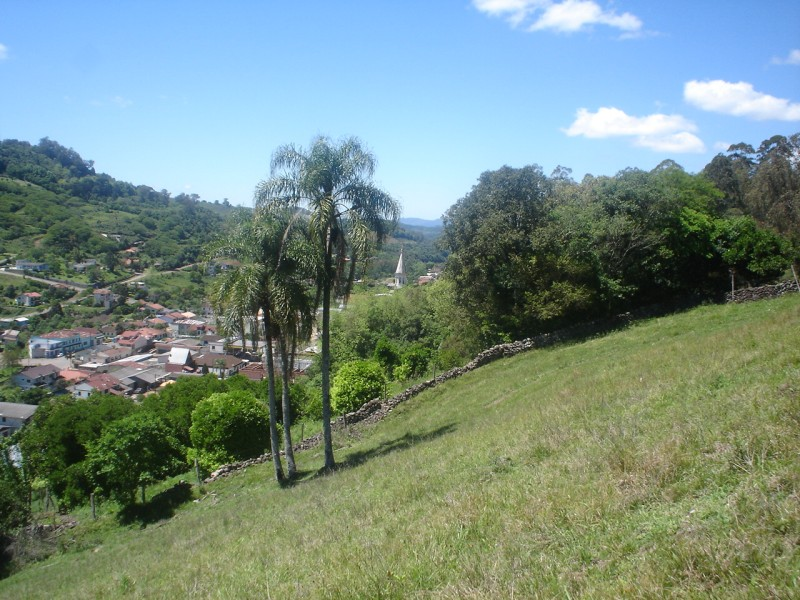
Partial view of the city

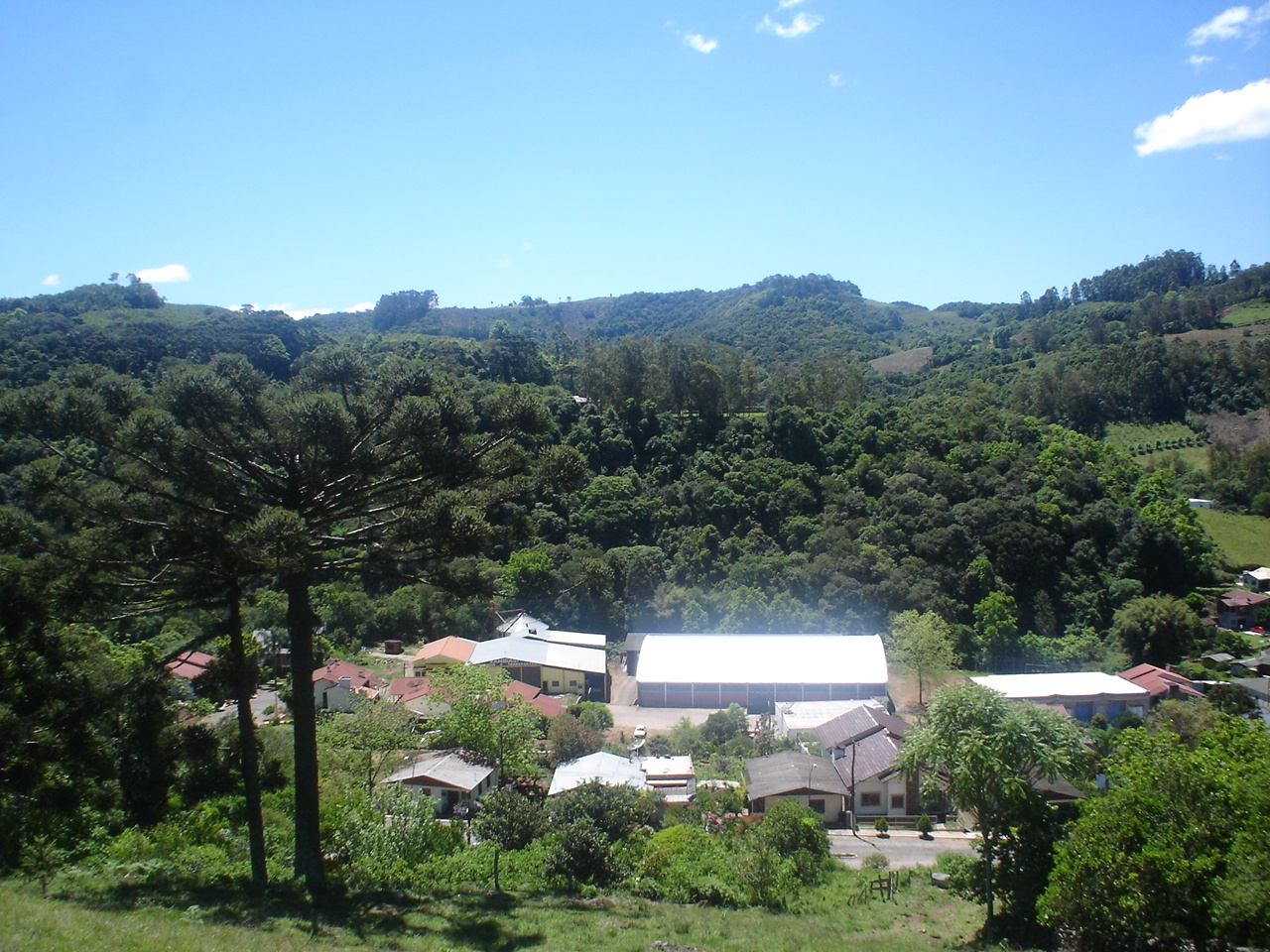
Hills

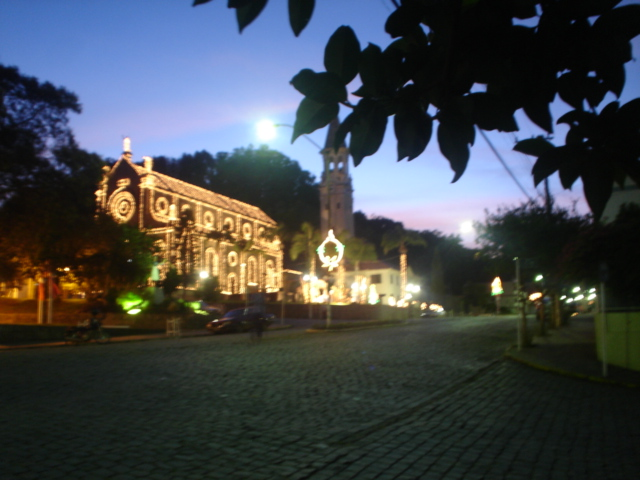
Paróquia São João Batista at Christmastime

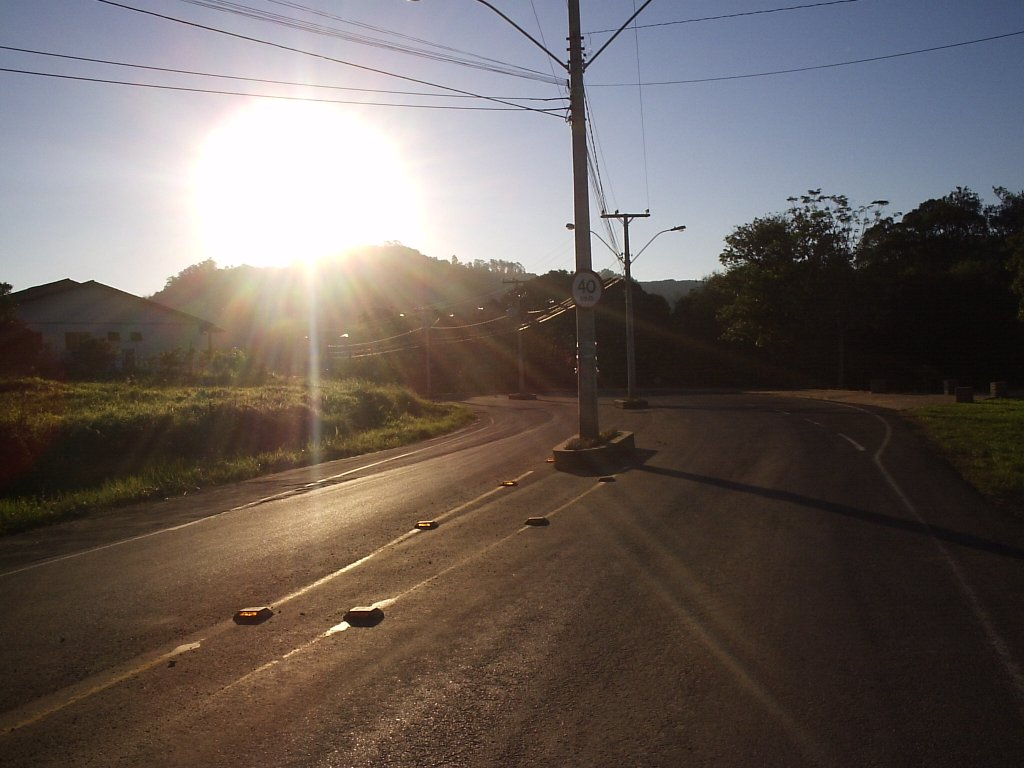
São Cristóvão

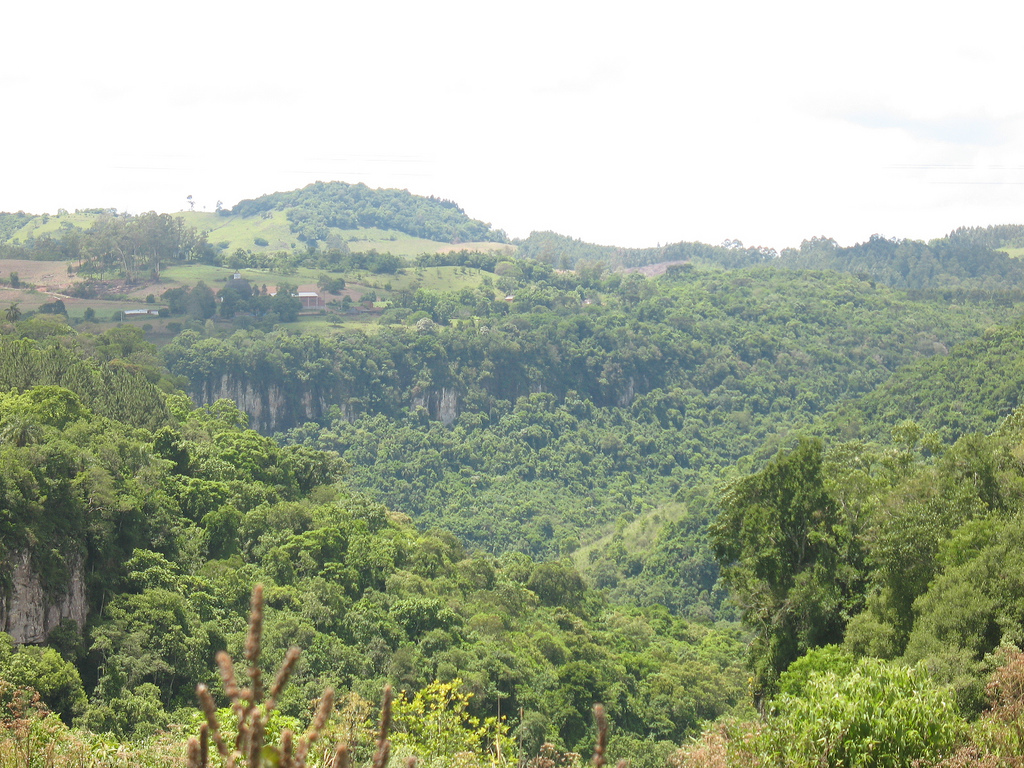
Canyon of São Cristóvão

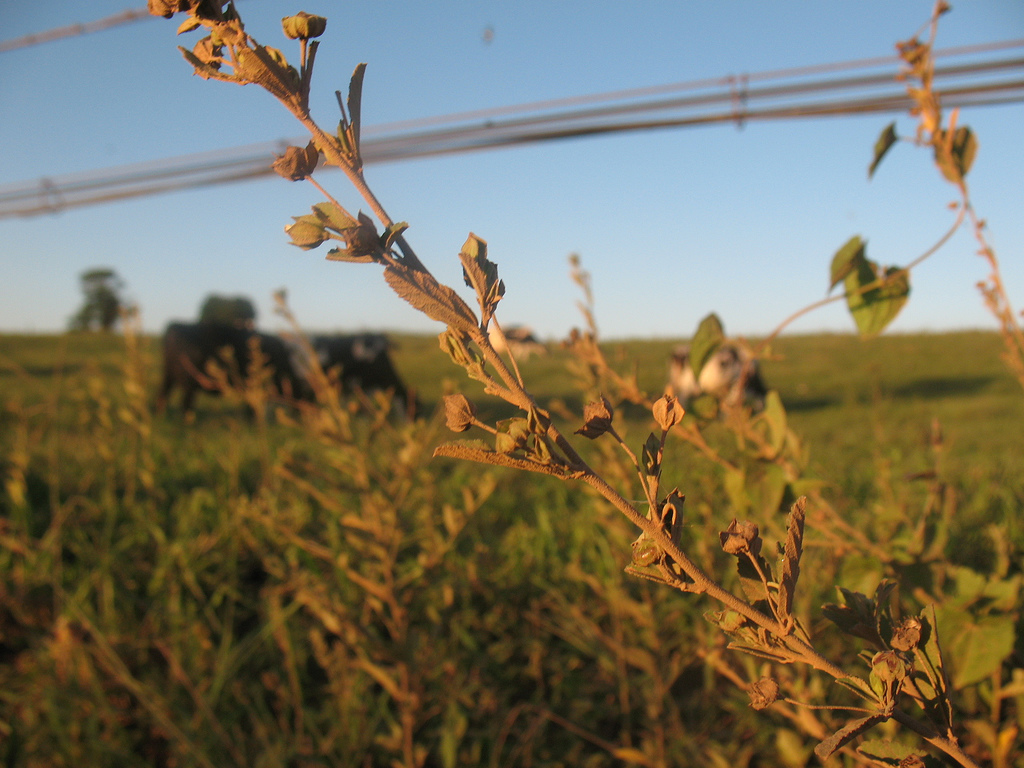
Fields

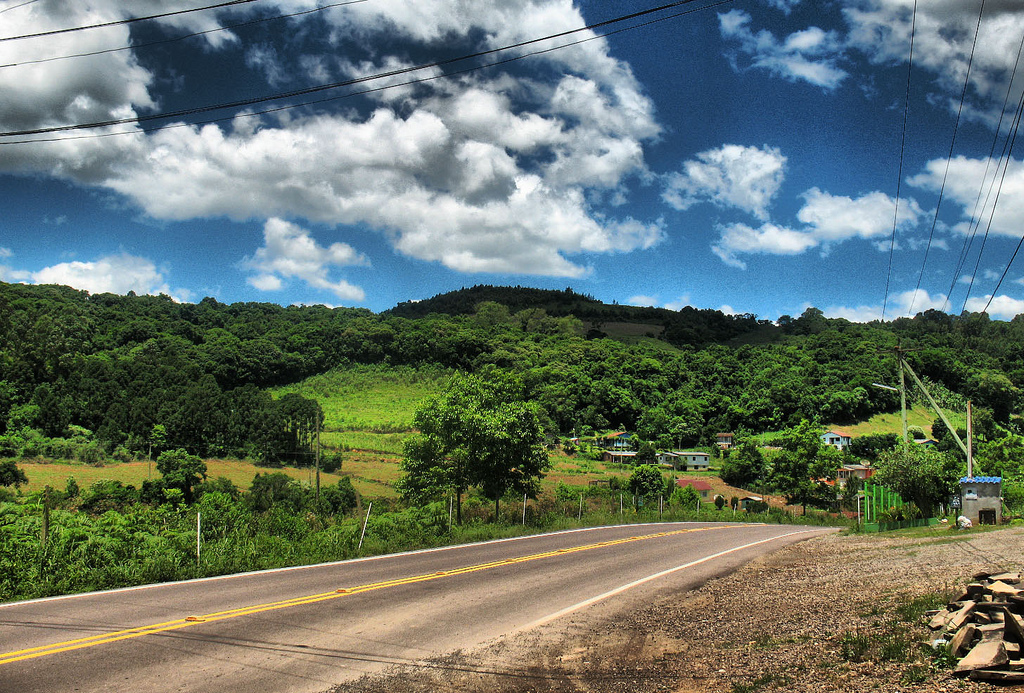
São Cristóvão

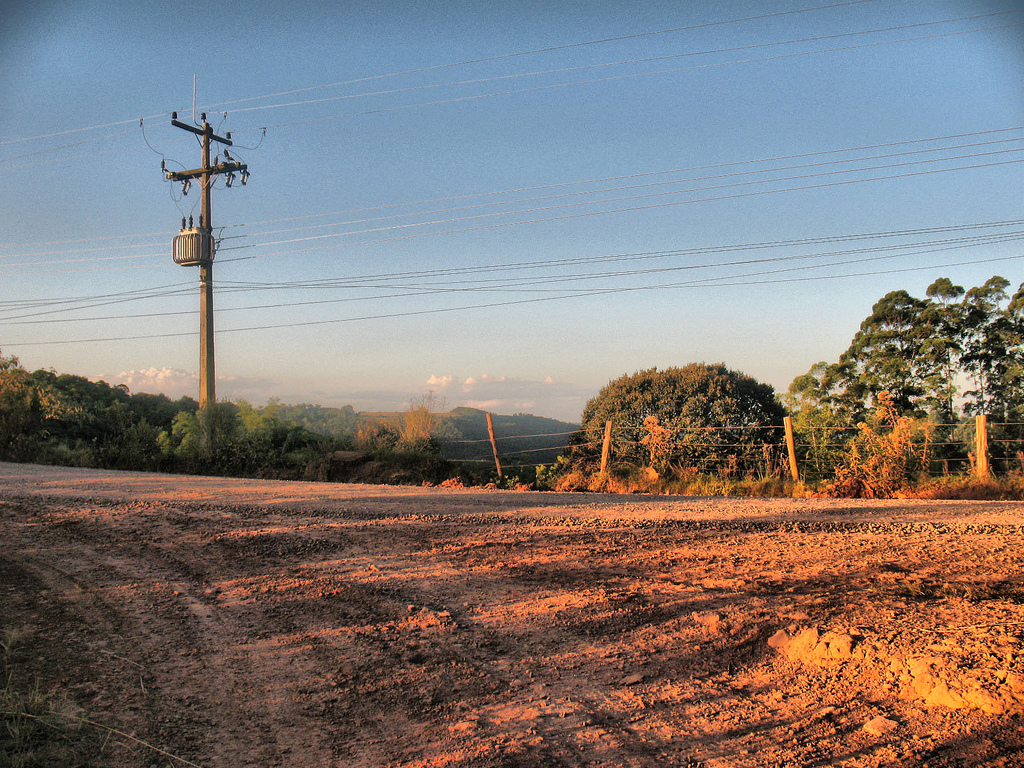
Street

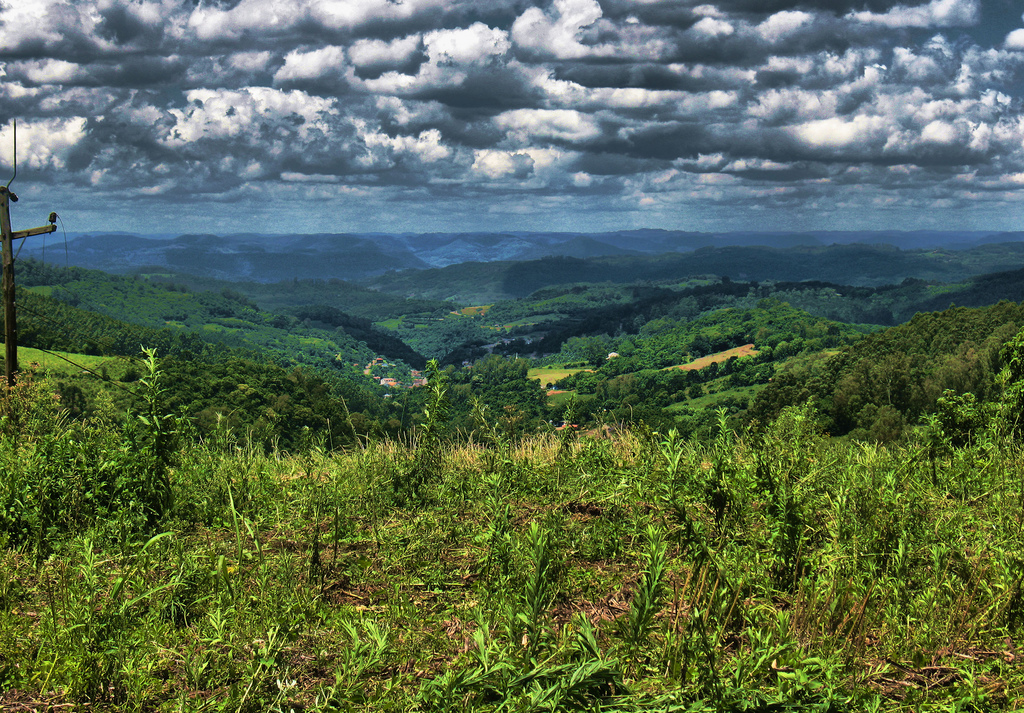
Amazing view

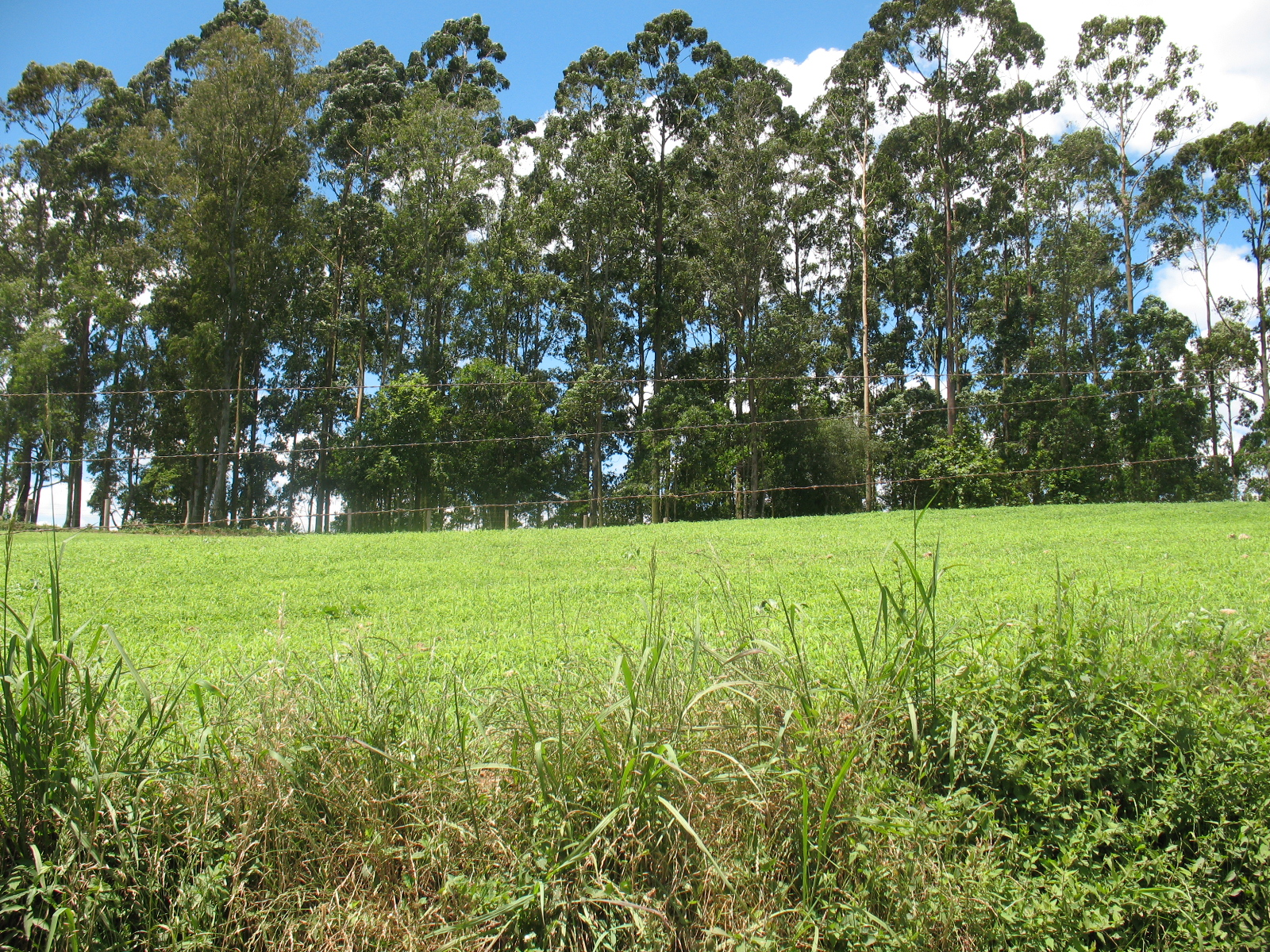
Country

== See also ==
- List of municipalities in Rio Grande do Sul
