= 1993–94 SV Werder Bremen season =

SV Werder Bremen
1993–94 season
- Manager: Otto Rehhagel
- Stadium: Weser-Stadion
- Bundesliga: 8th
- DFB-Pokal: Winners
- Champions League: Group stage
- DFL-Supercup: Winners
- Top goalscorer: League: All: Wynton Rufer (24)
Home colours	Away colours

During the 1993–94 season, SV Werder Bremen played in the Bundesliga, the highest tier of the German football league system.

== Season summary ==
Werder Bremen failed to retain their Bundesliga title, finishing in eighth position. They also failed to make a splash in the Champions League, with a 1–1 draw against eventual champions Milan in the group stage being cancelled out by a 5–0 home thrashing by Porto. However, they did win the DFB-Pokal by defeating Rot-Weiss Essen, making it four seasons in a row with silverware for the club.

== First team squad ==
Squad at end of season

No.	Pos.	Nation	Player
—	GK	GER	Hans-Jürgen Gundelach
—	GK	GER	Oliver Reck
—	GK	GER	Frank Rost
—	DF	GER	Dietmar Beiersdorfer
—	DF	GER	Manfred Bockenfeld
—	DF	GER	Uli Borowka
—	DF	GER	Bernd Goldschmidt
—	DF	GER	Gunnar Sauer
—	DF	GER	Thomas Schaaf
—	DF	GER	Kay Wenschlag
—	DF	GER	Andree Wiedener
—	DF	NOR	Rune Bratseth
—	MF	GER	Mario Basler

No.	Pos.	Nation	Player
—	MF	GER	Marco Bode
—	MF	GER	Dieter Eilts
—	MF	GER	Uwe Harttgen
—	MF	GER	Thorsten Legat
—	MF	GER	Martin Przondziono
—	MF	GER	Lars Unger
—	MF	GER	Mirko Votava (Note: Votava was born in Prague, Czechoslovakia (now the Czech Republic), but was raised in Australia and West Germany (now Germany) and made his international debut for West Germany in November 1979.)
—	MF	GER	Thomas Wolter
—	MF	AUT	Andreas Herzog
—	FW	GER	Marinus Bester
—	FW	GER	Bernd Hobsch
—	FW	GER	Frank Neubarth
—	FW	NZL	Wynton Rufer

== Transfers ==
=== In ===
- (Germany) Mario Basler - (Germany) Hertha BSC

=== Out ===
- (United States) Chad Deering - (Germany) FC Schalke 04
- (Germany) Klaus Allofs - retired
- (Germany) Stefan Kohn - (Germany) 1. FC Köln
