= 1992–93 SV Werder Bremen season =

SV Werder Bremen
1992–93 season
- Manager: Otto Rehhagel
- Stadium: Weser-Stadion
- Bundesliga: 1st
- DFB-Pokal: Quarter-finals
- UEFA Cup Winners' Cup: Second round
- European Super Cup: Runners-up
- Top goalscorer: League: Wynton Rufer (17); All: Wynton Rufer (27)
Home colours

During the 1992–93 season, SV Werder Bremen played in the Bundesliga, the highest tier of the German football league system.

== Season summary ==
Although Werder Bremen failed to retain the Cup Winner's Cup, they more than made up for it by winning the Bundesliga for the first time since 1988.

== Players ==
=== First team squad ===
Squad at end of season

No.	Pos.	Nation	Player
—	GK	GER	Hans-Jürgen Gundelach
—	GK	GER	Oliver Reck
—	DF	GER	Dietmar Beiersdorfer
—	DF	GER	Manfred Bockenfeld
—	DF	GER	Uli Borowka
—	DF	GER	Thomas Schaaf
—	DF	NOR	Rune Bratseth
—	MF	GER	Marco Bode
—	MF	GER	Dieter Eilts
—	MF	GER	Uwe Harttgen

No.	Pos.	Nation	Player
—	MF	GER	Thorsten Legat
—	MF	GER	Mirko Votava (Note: Votava was born in Prague, Czechoslovakia (now the Czech Republic), but was raised in Australia and West Germany (now Germany) and made his international debut for West Germany in November 1979.)
—	MF	GER	Thomas Wolter
—	MF	AUT	Andi Herzog
—	FW	GER	Klaus Allofs
—	FW	GER	Bernd Hobsch
—	FW	GER	Stefan Kohn
—	FW	GER	Frank Neubarth
—	FW	NED	Arie van Lent
—	FW	NZL	Wynton Rufer

=== Left club during season ===
Note: Flags indicate national team as defined under FIFA eligibility rules; some limited exceptions apply. Players may hold more than one non-FIFA nationality.

No.	Pos.	Nation	Player
—	MF	GER	Günter Hermann (to SG Wattenscheid 09)

=== Reserve squad ===
Note: Flags indicate national team as defined under FIFA eligibility rules; some limited exceptions apply. Players may hold more than one non-FIFA nationality.

No.	Pos.	Nation	Player
—	DF	GER	Gunnar Sauer
—	DF	GER	Kay Wenschlag
—	DF	GER	Andree Wiedener

No.	Pos.	Nation	Player
—	MF	GER	Martin Przondziono
—	MF	GER	Lars Unger
—	MF	USA	Chad Deering
