= 1992 European Super Cup =

SV Werder Bremen	Barcelona
(Germany)	(Spain)
2	3
- on aggregate

First leg
SV Werder Bremen	Barcelona
1	1
- Date: 10 February 1993
- Venue: Weser-Stadion, Bremen
- Referee: Kim Milton Nielsen (Denmark)
- Attendance: 22,098

Second leg
Barcelona	SV Werder Bremen
2	1
- Date: 10 March 1993
- Venue: Camp Nou, Barcelona
- Referee: Bo Karlsson (Sweden)
- Attendance: 75,000

The 1992 European Super Cup was the 17th edition of the European Super Cup, an annual football match organized by UEFA (the Union of European Football Associations) and contested by the winners of the previous season's European Cup and Cup Winners' Cup competitions. It was played between Barcelona and SV Werder Bremen, with Barcelona winning 3–2 on aggregate.

== Match details ==
=== First leg ===
10 February 1993

SV Werder Bremen (Germany)	1–1	(Spain) Barcelona
Allofs 88'	Report	Salinas 38'

Weserstadion, Bremen
Attendance: 22,098
Referee: Kim Milton Nielsen (Denmark)

SV Werder Bremen	Barcelona

GK	1	(Germany) Oliver Reck
RWB	2	(Germany) Manfred Bockenfeld	(yellow card) 36'
LWB	3	(Germany) Thorsten Legat
SW	4	(Norway) Rune Bratseth
AM	5	(Germany) Marco Bode		(substituted off) 69'
CB	6	(Germany) Uli Borowka
CB	7	(Germany) Dieter Eilts
CM	8	(Germany) Miroslav Votava (c)
CF	9	(Germany) Bernd Hobsch		(substituted off) 77'
CM	10	(Austria) Andi Herzog
CF	11	(Germany) Frank Neubarth
Substitutes:
GK	12	(Germany) Hans-Jürgen Gundelach
FW	13	(Germany) Stefan Kohn		(substituted on) 69'
MF	14	(Germany) Uwe Harttgen
DF	15	(Germany) Thomas Schaaf
FW	16	(Germany) Klaus Allofs		(substituted on) 77'
Manager:
(Germany) Otto Rehhagel

GK	1	(Spain) Andoni Zubizarreta (c)
RB	2	(Spain) Albert Ferrer
CM	3	(Spain) Guillermo Amor	(yellow card) 54'
SW	4	(Netherlands) Ronald Koeman	(yellow card) 73'
CB	5	(Spain) Miguel Ángel Nadal
CM	6	(Spain) José Mari Bakero	(yellow card) 61'	(substituted off) 67'
RF	7	(Spain) Jon Andoni Goikoetxea
LF	8	(Bulgaria) Hristo Stoichkov
CF	9	(Spain) Julio Salinas		(substituted off) 83'
LB	10	(Netherlands) Richard Witschge
AM	11	(Spain) Eusebio Sacristán
Substitutes:
DF	12	(Spain) José Ramón Alexanko
GK	13	(Spain) Carles Busquets
FW	14	(Spain) Txiki Begiristain		(substituted on) 67'
DF	15	(Spain) Pablo Alfaro
FW	16	(Spain) Thomas Christiansen		(substituted on) 83'
Manager:
(Netherlands) Johan Cruyff

=== Second leg ===
10 March 1993

Barcelona (Spain)	2–1	(Germany) SV Werder Bremen
Stoichkov 32'; Goikoetxea 48'	Report	Rufer 41' (pen.)

Camp Nou, Barcelona
Attendance: 75,000
Referee: Bo Karlsson (Sweden)

Barcelona	SV Werder Bremen

GK	1	(Spain) Andoni Zubizarreta (c)
RB	2	(Spain) Albert Ferrer
DM	3	(Spain) Pep Guardiola		(substituted off) 79'
SW	4	(Netherlands) Ronald Koeman
DM	5	(Spain) Miguel Ángel Nadal
CM	6	(Spain) José Mari Bakero		(substituted off) 50'
CF	7	(Spain) Jon Andoni Goikoetxea
CF	8	(Bulgaria) Hristo Stoichkov	(yellow card) 75'
AM	9	(Denmark) Michael Laudrup
CM	10	(Spain) Guillermo Amor
LB	11	(Spain) Eusebio Sacristán
Substitutes:
DF	12	(Spain) José Ramón Alexanko
GK	13	(Spain) Carles Busquets
FW	14	(Spain) Txiki Begiristain		(substituted on) 50'
DF	15	(Spain) Pablo Alfaro
FW	16	(Spain) Julio Salinas		(substituted on) 79'
Manager:
(Netherlands) Johan Cruyff

GK	1	(Germany) Oliver Reck	(red card) 30'
CB	2	(Germany) Thomas Schaaf		(substituted off) 30'
LWB	3	(Germany) Thorsten Legat		(substituted off) 77'
SW	4	(Norway) Rune Bratseth (c)
RWB	5	(Germany) Thomas Wolter
CB	6	(Germany) Uli Borowka
CM	7	(Germany) Dieter Eilts
CF	8	(New Zealand) Wynton Rufer
CF	9	(Germany) Bernd Hobsch
CM	10	(Austria) Andi Herzog
AM	11	(Germany) Marco Bode
Substitutes:
GK	12	(Germany) Hans-Jürgen Gundelach		(substituted on) 30'
FW	13	(Germany) Stefan Kohn
FW	14	(Germany) Klaus Allofs	(yellow card) 88'	(substituted on) 77'
DF	15	(Germany) Dietmar Beiersdorfer
MF	16	(Germany) Uwe Harttgen
Manager:
(Germany) Otto Rehhagel

== See also ==
- 1992 European Cup Final
- 1992 European Cup Winners' Cup Final
- 1992–93 UEFA Champions League
- 1992–93 European Cup Winners' Cup
- 1992–93 FC Barcelona season
- 1992–93 SV Werder Bremen season
- FC Barcelona in international football
- SV Werder Bremen in European football
