= 1994 DFB-Pokal final =

- Match programme cover
- Event: 1993–94 DFB-Pokal
Werder Bremen	Rot-Weiss Essen
3	1
- Date: 14 May 1994
- Venue: Olympiastadion, Berlin
- Referee: Manfred Amerell (Munich)
- Attendance: 76,391

The 1994 DFB-Pokal final decided the winner of the 1993–94 DFB-Pokal, the 51st season of Germany's premier knockout football cup competition. It was played on 14 May 1994 at the Olympiastadion in Berlin. Werder Bremen won the match 3–1 against Rot-Weiss Essen to claim their third cup title, qualifying for the 1994–95 UEFA Cup Winners' Cup and the 1994 DFB-Supercup.

== Route to the final ==
The DFB-Pokal was a 76 teams in a single-elimination knockout cup competition. There were a total of six rounds leading up to the final. In the first round, some teams were given a bye. Teams were drawn against each other, and the winner after 90 minutes would advance. If still tied, 30 minutes of extra time was played. If the score was still level, a penalty shoot-out was used to determine the winner.

Note: In all results below, the score of the finalist is given first (H: home; A: away).

Werder Bremen		Round	Rot-Weiss Essen
Opponent	Result	1993–94 DFB-Pokal	Opponent	Result
Stuttgarter Kickers (H)	2–1 (a.e.t.)	Round 2	1. FC Bocholt (A)	3–2
Kickers Offenbach (A)	1–1 (a.e.t.) (5–3 p)	Round 3	FC St. Pauli (H)	3–2 (a.e.t.)
Hamburger SV (H)	4–2	Round of 16	MSV Duisburg (H)	4–2
1. FC Kaiserslautern (H)	2–2 (a.e.t.) (4–3 p)	Quarter-finals	Carl Zeiss Jena (A)	0–0 (a.e.t.) (6–5 p)
Dynamo Dresden (A)	2–0	Semi-finals	Tennis Borussia Berlin (H)	2–0

== Match details ==
14 May 1994
18:15 CEST

Werder Bremen	3–1	Rot-Weiss Essen
Beiersdorfer 17'; Herzog 38'; Rufer 88' (pen.)	Report	Bangoura 50'

Olympiastadion, Berlin
Attendance: 76,391
Referee: Manfred Amerell (Munich)

Werder Bremen	Rot-Weiss Essen

GK	1	(Germany) Oliver Reck
RB	2	(Germany) Thomas Wolter	Booked
CB	4	(Norway) Rune Bratseth (c)
CB	5	(Germany) Dietmar Beiersdorfer
LB	3	(Germany) Marco Bode
RM	6	(Germany) Mario Basler		(substituted off) 75'
CM	8	(Germany) Miroslav Votava
CM	7	(Germany) Dieter Eilts
LM	9	(Germany) Bernd Hobsch
AM	10	(Austria) Andi Herzog		(substituted off) 84'
CF	11	(New Zealand) Wynton Rufer
Substitutes:
GK		(Germany) Hans-Jürgen Gundelach
DF	15	(Germany) Andree Wiedener		(substituted on) 75'
DF	16	(Germany) Uli Borowka		(substituted on) 84'
MF		(Germany) Thorsten Legat
FW		(Germany) Frank Neubarth
Manager:
(Germany) Otto Rehhagel

GK	1	(Germany) Frank Kurth
CB	2	(Germany) Ingo Pickenäcker (c)		(substituted off) 39'
CB		(Croatia) Kristian Zedi
CB		(Germany) Mathias Jack
RWB		(Germany) Harald Kügler
LWB		(Germany) Robert Reichert		(substituted off) 49'
DM		(Germany) Jürgen Margref
CM		(Germany) Adrian Spyrka
CM	4	(Senegal) Daouda Bangoura
AM		(Germany) Jörg Lipinski
CF	7	(Germany) Christian Dondera
Substitutes:
GK		(Germany) Jochen Gramse
DF	12	(Germany) Roman Geschlecht		(substituted on) 39'
MF	13	(Germany) Oliver Grein	Booked	(substituted on) 49'
MF		(Germany) Uwe Wegmann
FW		(Cameroon) Olivier Djappa
Manager:
(Germany) Wolfgang Frank

Match rules

- 90 minutes.
- 30 minutes of extra time if necessary.
- Penalty shoot-out if scores still level.
- Maximum of two substitutions.
