= Otto Rehhagel =

German football player and manager (born 1938)

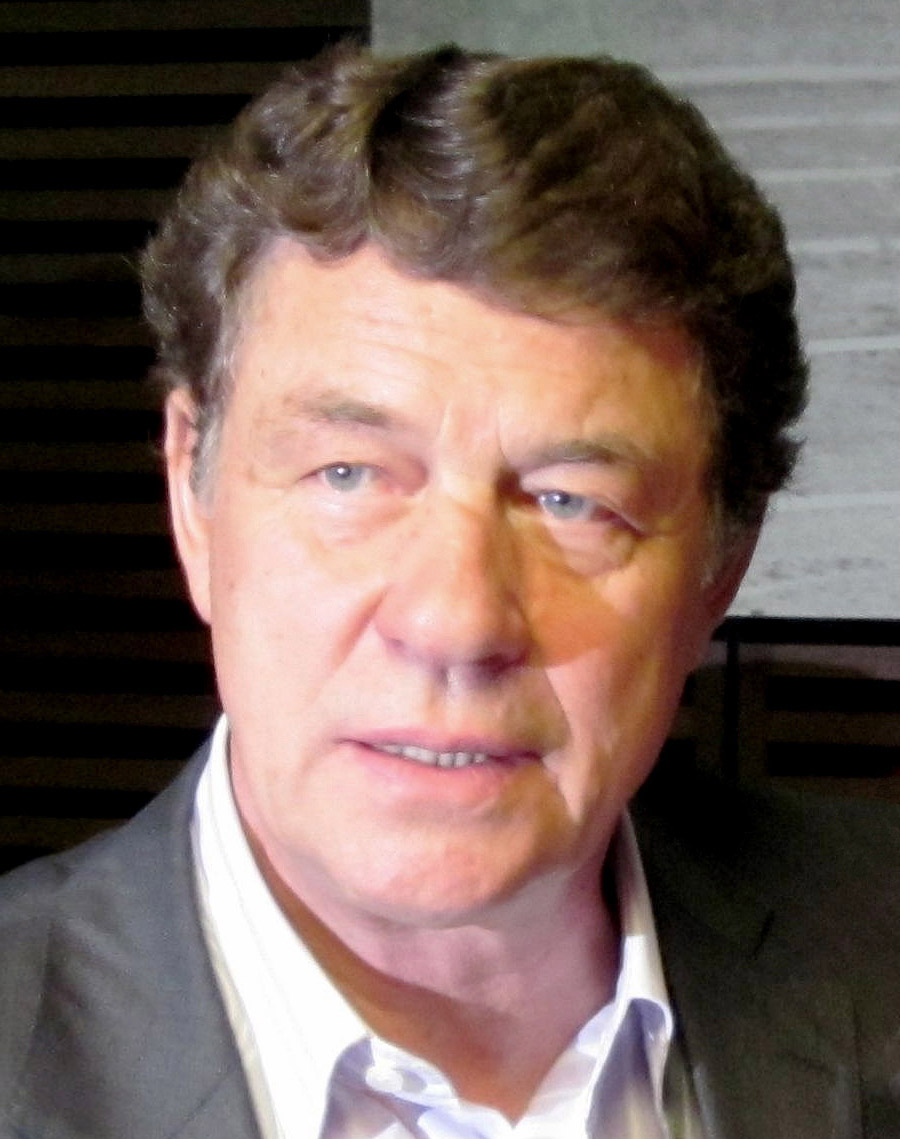
- Rehhagel in 2010

Personal information
- Date of birth: 9 August 1938 (age 88)
- Place of birth: Essen, Germany
- Height: 1.77 m (5 ft 10 in)
- Position: Defender

Youth career
- 1948–1957: TuS Helene Altenessen

Senior career*
Years	Team	Apps	(Gls)
1957–1960	TuS Helene Altenessen		
1960–1963	Rot-Weiss Essen	90	(3)
1963–1965	Hertha BSC	53	(6)
1965–1972	1. FC Kaiserslautern	148	(17)

International career
1960	West Germany amateur	2	(0)

Managerial career
- 1972: FV Rockenhausen
- 1972–1973: 1. FC Saarbrücken
- 1974–1975: Kickers Offenbach
- 1976: Werder Bremen
- 1976–1978: Borussia Dortmund
- 1978–1979: Arminia Bielefeld
- 1979–1980: Fortuna Düsseldorf
- 1981–1995: Werder Bremen
- 1995–1996: Bayern Munich
- 1996–2000: 1. FC Kaiserslautern
- 2001–2010: Greece
- 2012: Hertha BSC
Medal record
Men's football
Representing Greece (as manager)
UEFA European Championship
Winner	2004 Portugal
- * Club domestic league appearances and goals

Otto Rehhagel (German: [ˈʁeːhaːɡl̩]; born 9 August 1938) is a German former football coach and player. He is nicknamed "King Otto" (βασιλιάς Όθων) for his triumph with the Greece national team in the 2004 European Championship and his successful coaching career in Germany.

Rehhagel is one of only two people who, as player and manager combined, has participated in over 1,000 Bundesliga matches (the other being Jupp Heynckes). In the Bundesliga, he holds the records for the most wins (387), most draws (205), most losses (228), and his teams scored the most goals (1,473) and conceded more (1,142) than any other. He served as the head coach of Werder Bremen between 1981 and 1995, winning the league title twice and the 1992 Cup Winners' Cup, the club's only continental title so far. He sensationally won the Bundesliga with promoted team 1. FC Kaiserslautern in 1998.

Internationally, Rehhagel coached Greece from 2001 to 2010 in their most successful footballing era — Greece unexpectedly won UEFA Euro 2004 and qualified for the 2010 FIFA World Cup, which was their second World Cup appearance.

== Playing career ==
Born in Altenessen, Rehhagel began his playing career with local club TuS Helene Altenessen in 1948. He moved to Rot-Weiss Essen, after the start of the Bundesliga for Hertha BSC (1963–65), and until 1972 for Kaiserslautern. He played 201 games in the Bundesliga. As a player, Rehhagel was known as a tough-as-nails defender.

== Managerial career ==
=== Early years ===
In 1974, he took charge of Kickers Offenbach, but failed to make an immediate impact as a manager. Most famously, while in charge of Borussia Dortmund in 1978, he suffered a historic, record-setting 12–0 loss to Borussia Mönchengladbach, after which the tabloids called him Otto Torhagel ("Tor" means goal in German, and "Hagel" means a hailstorm). In 1980, Rehhagel won his first trophy as a manager, when his Fortuna Düsseldorf side won the DFB-Pokal.

=== Werder Bremen ===
Rehhagel managed Werder Bremen from 1981 to 1995. During these 14 golden years for the club, Rehhagel transformed Werder from a small minnow into a powerhouse, dazzling spectators with powerful up-tempo play and a smothering defence. During this spell, Werder Bremen established themselves as one of the main teams in the Bundesliga, overtaking hated rivals Hamburg as the top club in the north and sparking an intense feud with Bayern Munich. In the mid-eighties, Rehhagel often fell just short of success and had a string of second places and Cup Final losses. In that time, his nickname was Otto II or Vizeadmiral ("Vice Admiral"). However, Rehhagel led Werder Bremen to two German championships in 1988 and 1993, two DFB-Pokal victories in 1991 and 1994, as well as winning the European Cup Winners' Cup in 1992. In this period, Rehhagel produced a host of international stars, such as Rudi Völler, Karl-Heinz Riedle, Dieter Eilts, Marco Bode, Mario Basler, Hany Ramzy, Andreas Herzog and Rune Bratseth. Rehhagel's Werder Bremen team of 1987–88 was at that time the squad which conceded the fewest goals ever in the Bundesliga (22), this record was surpassed by Bayern Munich in the 2007–08 season with 21 goals. His stint with Werder Bremen (14 years Bundesliga) is the second longest consecutive occupation as a manager ever in the Bundesliga. It was eventually surpassed by Volker Finke of Freiburg (16 years).

=== Bayern Munich ===
After 14 years at Werder Bremen, Rehhagel left to manage former hated rivals, Bayern Munich, before the start of the 1995–96 season. Prior to Rehhagel's arrival, Bayern had a disappointing, but financially lucrative season in 1994–95 (a very poor sixth place in the Bundesliga, but semi-finals in the Champions League). In the summer of 1995, Bayern spent a lot of money, buying Jürgen Klinsmann, Andreas Herzog, and others, and Rehhagel was brought in as manager to replace Giovanni Trapattoni. It was widely expected that Munich would steamroll the opposition in 1995–96, but from day 1, Rehhagel clashed with the team and the team environment. His single-minded and occasionally eccentric ways did not mesh at all with Bayern, who quickly felt that Rehhagel was too rural at heart and had no clue about how to interact in the fancy environment of Munich. Moreover, Rehhagel's old-school tactics and patronising of the Bayern players caused major antipathy in the Bayern team, especially from Klinsmann, who never missed an opportunity to take shots at Rehhagel. Despite Rehhagel getting Bayern to the UEFA Cup final, Bayern's results in the Bundesliga dropped alarmingly in the second half of the season, and Rehhagel was famously sacked just 4 days before they were due to play in the first leg of the 1996 UEFA Cup final. Rehhagel's job was taken over by Franz Beckenbauer, who led the team to victory in the 1996 UEFA Cup final, but saw no upturn in form in the last couple of weeks in the Bundesliga, leading Bayern to finished second, as Borussia Dortmund won their second German championship in a row.

=== 1. FC Kaiserslautern ===
After being sacked by Bayern Munich, Rehhagel took over as manager of Kaiserslautern in 1996, after a season where the club had won the DFB-Pokal but had also been relegated from the top-flight following a catastrophic season in the Bundesliga. Rehhagel's team won the 1996–97 2. Bundesliga by ten points, ending the season with a 7-6 win over SV Meppen.

In Rehhagel's second season, Kaiserslautern won the Bundesliga title, the first and so far only German championship triumph by a team that had just been promoted the previous season. Going into the season, expectations were low and the team's goal was only to avoid relegation. They started with a 1-0 win over reigning champions and Rehhagel's former club, Bayern, and moved into first place after four matchdays. Kaiserslautern were still first when the two teams played again, and won again, giving them a seven point lead at the top of the table. Kaiserslautern secured the title with a win over VfL Wolfsburg in the penultimate game of the season. Kaiserslautern's championship is regarded as one of the greatest achievements in German football history and was described as "something that will never happen again" by both Rehhagel and Rudi Völler.

As well as Jupp Heynckes, Rehhagel was offered the job of managing the Germany national team in summer 1998, but rejected it. In the season after the title, Rehhagel coached Kaiserslautern to the quarter-finals of the 1998–99 UEFA Champions League and a fifth-placed finish in the Bundesliga, having club captain Andreas Brehme and libero Miroslav Kadlec. Rehhagel resigned from Kaiserslautern in October 2000 after a bad start to the new season and pressure from supporters. His final year at the club had been marred by a public dispute with star player Ciriaco Sforza.

Rehhagel finished with a record of 87 wins, 39 draws, and 48 losses.

=== Greece national team ===
In August 2001, following Vassilis Daniil's departure, Rehhagel was appointed as the new manager of Greece, ahead of other candidates, such as Marco Tardelli, Nevio Scala, Vanderlei Luxemburgo, and Terry Venables, who had also been considered for the managerial post. Rehhagel's first match in charge was in October 2001, a 2002 World Cup qualifier against Finland, which ended in a 5–1 away defeat. As a result, he rebuilt the squad, and in October 2003, after a 1–0 win over Northern Ireland, Greece qualified automatically for Euro 2004, ahead of Spain and Ukraine. Ranked 150–1 outsiders, they nevertheless defeated host nation Portugal, holders France and the much more fancied Czech Republic on the way to the final, where they again defeated Portugal 1–0. Rehhagel, who was seen as the man most responsible for the team's success, became the first foreign manager ever to win a European Championship and remains the only one to date. Despite not having a star-studded line-up, the Greek team won the championship, conceding no goals in the knockout stage.

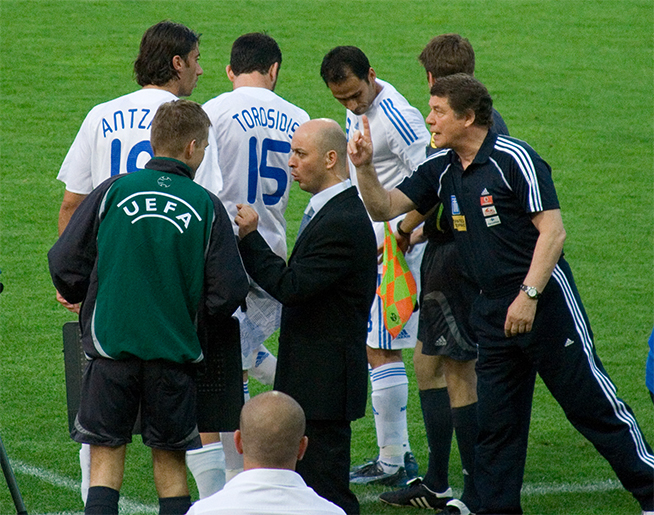
Rehhagel giving instructions to players of the Greece national football team before the changes

Rehhagel adopted a defensive approach in playing his Greek side, using energetic midfielders to wear down the opponents and the policy of defending in numbers to numb the opposition's attacks. When charged with boring play, he said, "No one should forget that a coach adapts the tactics to the characteristics of the available players." His time at Werder Bremen, in contrast, saw play described as flashy and spectacular attacking football.

After Rudi Völler resigned as Germany coach in the wake of that country's first-round exit in Euro 2004, Rehhagel was considered by many to be a strong candidate for his homeland's job. He had the support of the public, despite being considered a maverick by the footballing establishment. After three other candidates removed themselves from consideration, Rehhagel received an offer to take over as Germany coach, which he officially turned down on 10 July.

In their qualifying group for the 2006 FIFA World Cup, the Greek side failed to make the grade, finishing fourth in a tough group which saw Ukraine advance as group winner and Turkey go on to the play-off. The team returned to success though by qualifying for Euro 2008, ending the qualifying stage with the highest points total of any team and ensuring they would be able to defend their title. On 30 March 2008, Rehhagel extended his contract with Greece until 2010. The Euro 2008 ended in disappointment after three group stage losses against Sweden, Russia, and eventual winners Spain.

For the 2010 FIFA World Cup qualifying group and having finished second in Group 2 behind Switzerland, coach Rehhagel and the national team faced Ukraine in a two-legged play-off and won 1–0 in Donetsk after a 0–0 draw in Piraeus, with Dimitris Salpingidis scoring the winner. The win against Ukraine allowed the Greek squad to compete in the 2010 FIFA World Cup held in South Africa and solidified the position of Otto Rehhagel as one of the most important people in the history of Greek sport. At the age of 71, he also became the oldest national team manager to coach in a FIFA World Cup, surpassing Cesare Maldini's record from 2002. Greece lost to South Korea and Argentina, defeated Nigeria 2–1, and exited the FIFA World Cup in the group stage, despite Salpingidis scoring Greece's first ever goal in a World Cup against Nigeria. Rehhagel announced his intention to leave his coaching position after the World Cup. On 23 June 2010, he announced his resignation from Greece.

The 2021 documentary King Otto by New York-based director Christopher André Marks chronicles Rehhagel's success in Greece. The film's opening line quotes the first line of Homer's Odyssey, "Tell me, O muse, of that ingenious hero who travelled far and wide".

=== Hertha BSC ===
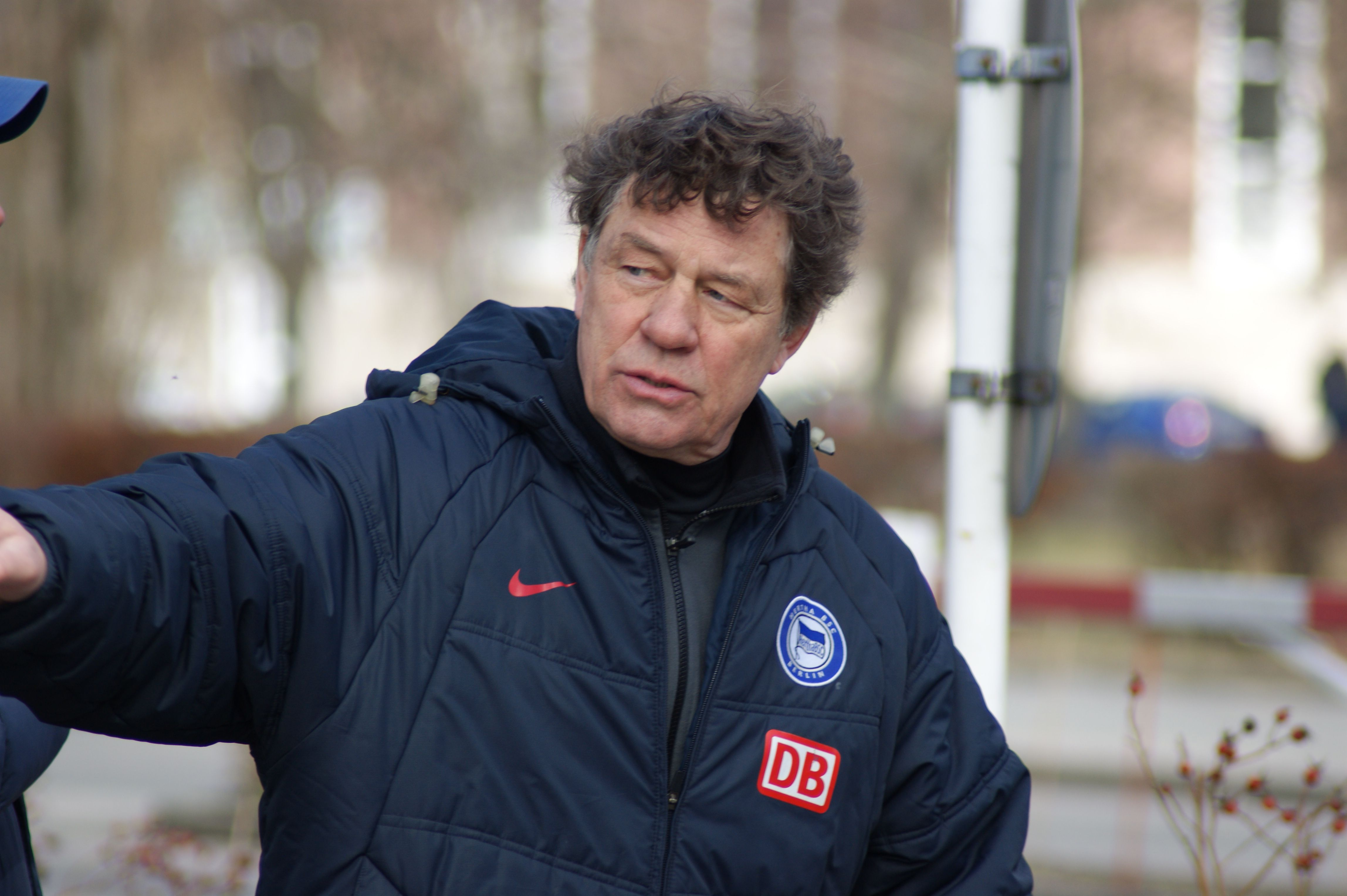
Rehhagel during his stint as Hertha Berlin manager

Rehhagel signed for ailing Bundesliga club Hertha BSC and was manager of the club between 18 February 2012 and 30 June 2012. His attempt to save Hertha from relegation however ended in a failure, after the Berliners were defeated by 2. Bundesliga club Fortuna Düsseldorf in a two-legged playoff. Rehhagel finished with a record of three wins, three draws, and eight losses.

== Style of management ==
Rehhagel popularized the phrase kontrollierte Offensive (controlled offence). He prefers a grass-roots approach to football, stressing the importance of at least two (often also three) big, strong headers in central defence. His defensive schemes often use a dominant libero, such as Rune Bratseth, Miroslav Kadlec, or Traianos Dellas. The latter was key to Rehhagel's defensive-minded set-up with Greece at Euro 2004, which made use of catenaccio–inspired man-to-man marking, including a deep defensive line with a sweeper, and hard-working play from the midfielders, who focussed primarily on pressing opponents and breaking down possession to win back the ball, and create chances on the counter-attack. In defence, Rehhagel usually prefers robustness and height over footballing abilities (the most notorious example being Ulrich Borowka). In the period of all-round, fluid defence, many have criticized this as dated and anachronistic, with Rehhagel rebutting the claims due to his success.

Rehhagel's teams regularly develop pressure on the wings complemented with at least one dominant header as the central striker. Examples include Mario Basler/Marco Bode playing on the wings at Bremen or Andreas Buck/Marco Reich at Kaiserslautern while (Rudi Völler, Karl-Heinz Riedle, Frank Neubarth, Olaf Marschall, and Angelos Charisteas) at the top of the formation.

Rehhagel generally favoured experienced players, while younger players often had more limited roles. At Kaiserslautern, Michael Ballack was frequentyly used as a substitute. Players coached by Rehhagel include Völler, Riedle, Marco Bode, Dieter Eilts, Marco Reich, Miroslav Klose, Angelos Charisteas, Sotiris Kyrgiakos, Theofanis Gekas.

With Greece he used man-marking, which was an unusual tactical throwback at the time, meaning their opponents were unprepared to combat it.

Rehhagel is also noted for his motivational abilities. His teams have often been characterised by strong cohesion and collective spirit, most prominently the Greece national team, which he transformed from a largely uncompetetive side to a highly committed and unified squad. He is also famous for reigniting the careers of famous players, such as Manfred Burgsmüller, Mirko Votava, Olaf Marschall or Theodoros Zagorakis.

Rehhagel is a politician known for restructuring clubs by making friends with powerful people and using them to eliminate the opposition in order to wield absolute power, preferring the system of a benign dictatorship. His way of handling a club has been immortalized as ottocracy, a pun on his name alluding to the style of management/government; autocracy.

Finally, Rehhagel is considered somewhat of a maverick in Germany. In decades of interviews, he has established a reputation for being eccentric, similarly to José Mourinho and Brian Clough. However, seeing his impressive record, he is apparently able to back up his words.

Famous players associated with Rehhagel include Klaus Allofs, Mario Basler, Marco Bode, Rune Bratseth, Manfred Burgsmüller, Theofanis Gekas, Angelos Charisteas, Traianos Dellas, Dieter Eilts, Andreas Herzog, Marian Hristov, Miroslav Klose, Olaf Marschall, Hany Ramzy, Karl-Heinz Riedle, Wynton Rufer, Thomas Schaaf, Ciriaco Sforza, Rudi Völler, Theodoros Zagorakis, Andreas Brehme and Michael Ballack.

== Personal life ==
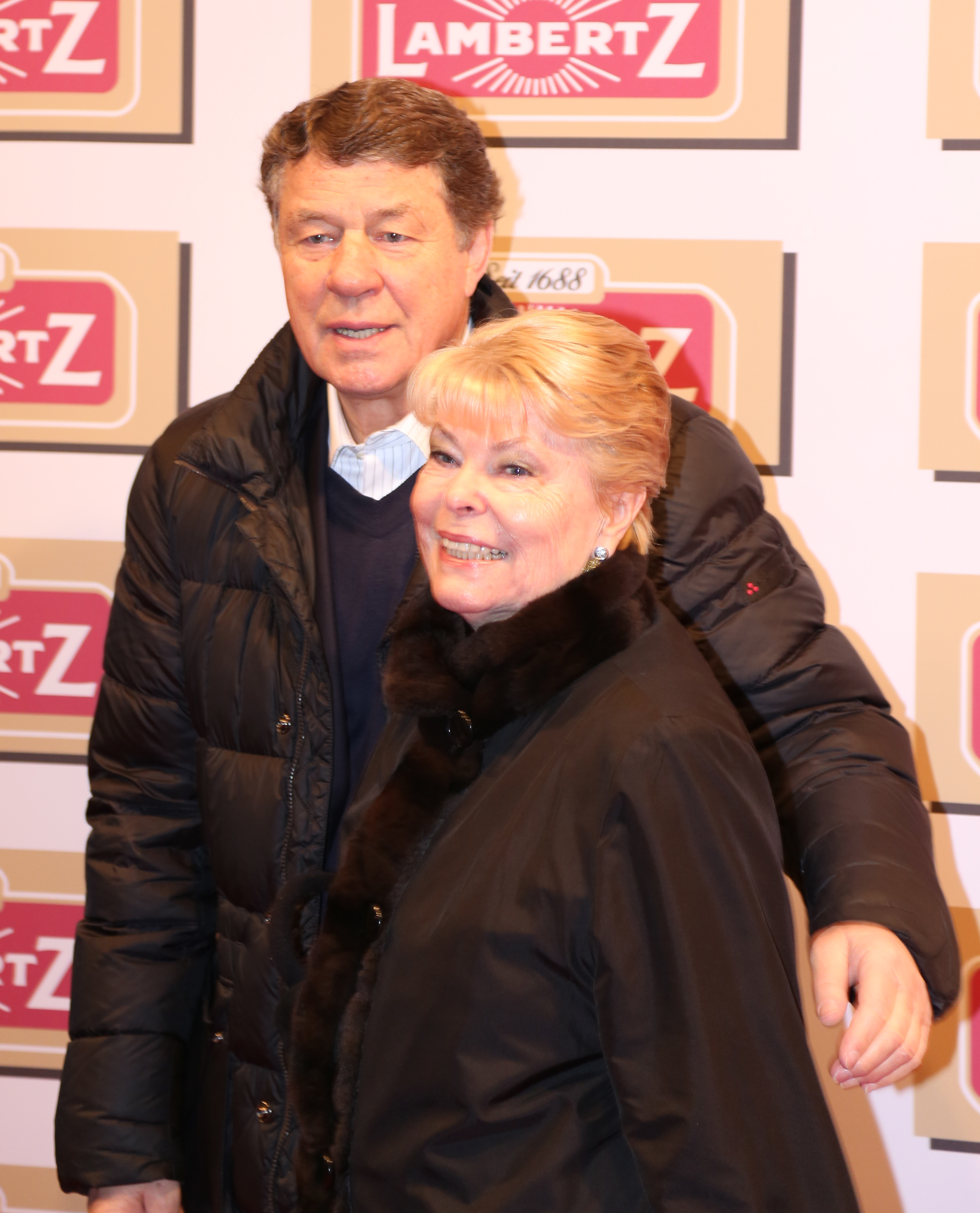
Otto with wife Beate Rehhagel in 2017

Rehhagel is married to Beate Rehhagel from Steele, Essen since 1963. They have one child, Jens Rehhagel, who has played football at semi-professional level.

Rehhagel likes to call himself Kind der Bundesliga ("Child of the Bundesliga"), having played in the first Bundesliga game, and spent his club career there, with nine teams. In Greece, he is called King Otto (βασιλιάς Όθων), probably in allusion to King Otto of Greece from Bavaria, however he already had this nickname during his coaching career in Germany. As a pun referring to Herakles, son of Zeus, he has been nicknamed "Rehakles" as well. Rehhagel is an honorary citizen of Athens.

== Managerial statistics ==
As of 15 May 2012

Team	From	To	Record					
Team	From	To	G	W	D	L	Win %	Ref.
1. FC Saarbrücken	1 July 1972	30 June 1973	30	7	10	13	23.33	
Kickers Offenbach	2 April 1974	9 December 1975	60	23	10	27	38.33	
Werder Bremen	29 February 1976	30 June 1976	13	4	5	4	30.77	
Borussia Dortmund	1 July 1976	30 April 1978	74	29	16	29	39.19	
Arminia Bielefeld	10 October 1978	11 October 1979	37	15	9	13	40.54	
Fortuna Düsseldorf	12 October 1979	5 December 1980	53	26	9	18	49.06	
Werder Bremen	2 April 1981	30 June 1995	609	322	156	131	52.87	
Bayern Munich	1 July 1995	27 April 1996	42	27	5	10	64.29	
1. FC Kaiserslautern	20 July 1996	1 October 2000	174	87	38	49	50.00	
Greece	9 August 2001	30 June 2010	106	52	22	32	49.06	
Hertha BSC	19 February 2012	30 June 2012	14	3	3	8	21.43	
Total			1,225	606	278	341	49.47	—

== Honours ==
=== Managerial honours ===
Fortuna Düsseldorf

- DFB-Pokal: 1979–80

Werder Bremen

- Bundesliga: 1987–88, 1992–93
- DFB-Pokal: 1990–91, 1993–94
- DFL-Supercup: 1988, 1993, 1994
- European Cup Winners' Cup: 1991–92

1. FC Kaiserslautern

- Bundesliga: 1997–98
- 2. Bundesliga: 1996–97

Greece

- UEFA European Championship: 2004

Individual

- Order of the Phoenix of the Hellenic Republic: (2005)
- Laureus World Sports Awards with the Greece: (2005)
- "Greece's Coach of the Year" (2004, 2007), first-ever foreigner to win this award
- IFFHS World's Best National Coach: 2004
- World Soccer 36th Greatest Manager of All Time: 2013
- France Football 46th Greatest Manager of All Time: 2019

== See also ==
- National team managers with 100 or more matches
- List of football managers with the most matches
