= 1987–88 Bundesliga =

25th season of the Bundesliga

Bundesliga
- Season: 1987–88
- Dates: 31 July 1987 – 21 May 1988
- Champions: Werder Bremen; 2nd Bundesliga title 2nd German title
- Relegated: FC Homburg; FC Schalke 04
- European Cup: SV Werder Bremen
- Cup Winners' Cup: Eintracht Frankfurt
- UEFA Cup: FC Bayern Munich; 1. FC Köln; VfB Stuttgart; 1. FC Nürnberg; Bayer 04 Leverkusen (title holders)
- Goals: 945
- Average goals/game: 3.09
- Top goalscorer: Jürgen Klinsmann (19)
- Biggest home win: FC Bayern 8–1 Schalke 04 (9 April 1988)
- Biggest away win: Hamburg 0–4 Karlsruhe (26 August 1987); Homburg 0–4 Nürnberg (5 September 1987)
- Highest scoring: M'gladbach 8–2 Hamburg (10 goals) (26 September 1987)

The 1987–88 Bundesliga was the 25th season of the Bundesliga, the premier football league in West Germany. It began on 31 July 1987 and ended on 21 May 1988. FC Bayern Munich were the defending champions.

== Competition modus ==
Every team played two games against each other team, one at home and one away. Teams received two points for a win and one point for a draw. If two or more teams were tied on points, places were determined by goal difference and, if still tied, by goals scored. The team with the most points were crowned champions while the two teams with the fewest points were relegated to 2. Bundesliga. The third-to-last team had to compete in a two-legged relegation/promotion play-off against the third-placed team from 2. Bundesliga.

== Team changes to 1986–87 ==
Fortuna Düsseldorf and SpVgg Blau-Weiß 1890 Berlin were directly relegated to the 2. Bundesliga after finishing in the last two places. They were replaced by Hannover 96 and Karlsruher SC. Relegation/promotion play-off participant FC Homburg won on aggregate against FC St. Pauli and thus retained their Bundesliga status.

== Team overview ==
Location of teams in Bundesliga 1987–88

Club	Location	Ground	Capacity
VfL Bochum	Bochum	Ruhrstadion	40,000
SV Werder Bremen	Bremen	Weserstadion	32,000
Borussia Dortmund	Dortmund	Westfalenstadion	54,000
Eintracht Frankfurt	Frankfurt	Waldstadion	62,000
Hamburger SV	Hamburg	Volksparkstadion	62,000
Hannover 96	Hanover	Niedersachsenstadion	60,400
FC Homburg	Homburg	Waldstadion	24,000
1. FC Kaiserslautern	Kaiserslautern	Fritz-Walter-Stadion	42,000
Karlsruher SC	Karlsruhe	Wildparkstadion	50,000
1. FC Köln	Cologne	Müngersdorfer Stadion	61,000
Bayer 04 Leverkusen	Leverkusen	Ulrich-Haberland-Stadion	20,000
SV Waldhof Mannheim	Ludwigshafen	Südweststadion	75,000
Borussia Mönchengladbach	Mönchengladbach	Bökelbergstadion	34,500
FC Bayern Munich	Munich	Olympiastadion	80,000
1. FC Nürnberg	Nuremberg	Städtisches Stadion	64,238
FC Schalke 04	Gelsenkirchen	Parkstadion	70,000
VfB Stuttgart	Stuttgart	Neckarstadion	72,000
Bayer 05 Uerdingen	Krefeld	Grotenburg Stadion	35,700

- ^1 Waldhof Mannheim played their matches in nearby Ludwigshafen because their own ground did not fulfil Bundesliga requirements.

== League table ==
Pos	Team	Pld	W	D	L	GF	GA	GD	Pts	Qualification or relegation
1	Werder Bremen (C)	34	22	8	4	61	22	+39	52	Qualification to European Cup first round
2	Bayern Munich	34	22	4	8	83	45	+38	48	Qualification to UEFA Cup first round (Note: Bayer Leverkusen won the UEFA Cup and thereby automatically qualified as title holders.)
3	1. FC Köln	34	18	12	4	57	28	+29	48	Qualification to UEFA Cup first round
4	VfB Stuttgart	34	16	8	10	69	49	+20	40	Qualification to UEFA Cup first round
5	1. FC Nürnberg	34	13	11	10	44	40	+4	37	Qualification to UEFA Cup first round
6	Hamburger SV	34	13	11	10	63	68	−5	37	
7	Borussia Mönchengladbach	34	14	5	15	55	53	+2	33	
8	Bayer Leverkusen	34	10	12	12	53	60	−7	32	Qualification to UEFA Cup first round
9	Eintracht Frankfurt	34	10	11	13	51	50	+1	31	Qualification to Cup Winners' Cup first round
10	Hannover 96	34	12	7	15	59	60	−1	31	
11	Bayer 05 Uerdingen	34	11	9	14	59	61	−2	31	
12	VfL Bochum	34	10	10	14	47	51	−4	30	
13	Borussia Dortmund	34	9	11	14	51	54	−3	29	
14	1. FC Kaiserslautern	34	11	7	16	53	62	−9	29	
15	Karlsruher SC	34	9	11	14	37	55	−18	29	
16	Waldhof Mannheim (O)	34	7	14	13	35	50	−15	28	Qualification to relegation play-offs
17	FC 08 Homburg (R)	34	7	10	17	37	70	−33	24	Relegation to 2. Bundesliga
18	Schalke 04 (R)	34	8	7	19	48	84	−36	23	Relegation to 2. Bundesliga

Source: www.dfb.de
Rules for classification: 1) points; 2) goal difference; 3) number of goals scored.
(C) Champions; (O) Play-off winners; (R) Relegated

== Results ==
Home \ Away	BOC	SVW	BVB	SGE	HSV	H96	HOM	FCK	KSC	KOE	B04	WMA	BMG	FCB	FCN	S04	VFB	B05
VfL Bochum	—	0–1	2–0	1–0	4–0	1–1	4–4	1–1	5–0	0–0	3–1	1–0	1–2	0–2	3–0	1–3	5–1	1–4
Werder Bremen	0–0	—	4–0	2–0	1–4	1–0	3–0	0–0	2–0	2–1	3–3	3–1	2–0	3–1	1–0	5–0	5–1	5–1
Borussia Dortmund	1–2	0–0	—	3–1	2–3	3–3	2–0	3–0	0–2	1–2	2–2	0–1	1–1	1–3	1–1	4–1	2–2	4–2
Eintracht Frankfurt	0–1	0–1	0–0	—	3–0	3–3	1–2	0–2	4–0	1–1	3–2	5–1	2–0	1–1	3–1	2–0	0–2	3–1
Hamburger SV	2–2	0–0	4–3	2–2	—	3–3	2–1	5–1	0–4	3–0	3–2	1–1	2–1	2–2	2–2	5–2	3–0	3–1
Hannover 96	1–0	0–1	2–3	1–2	3–1	—	5–1	1–0	3–2	0–3	6–1	3–1	2–4	2–1	1–2	3–1	3–3	0–0
FC Homburg	1–1	1–1	0–3	5–2	0–2	1–1	—	3–2	1–0	1–0	1–1	1–1	0–0	3–2	0–4	3–1	2–2	2–2
1. FC Kaiserslautern	4–2	0–0	3–1	2–2	0–3	4–1	1–0	—	1–1	3–0	1–3	2–2	5–2	3–1	1–2	5–2	2–1	2–2
Karlsruher SC	1–0	0–2	0–0	1–1	0–0	2–1	2–1	1–0	—	1–1	1–1	1–1	2–2	0–1	2–0	4–1	0–2	1–0
1. FC Köln	2–2	2–0	2–0	1–1	1–0	2–0	3–0	2–1	4–0	—	0–0	3–0	4–1	3–1	3–1	3–1	1–1	2–0
Bayer Leverkusen	0–0	1–3	2–2	1–3	2–0	2–0	2–1	2–0	0–0	1–1	—	1–0	2–1	3–4	1–1	3–2	2–1	0–0
Waldhof Mannheim	1–1	0–1	1–0	2–2	2–2	2–1	0–0	0–2	4–1	0–0	1–4	—	0–3	1–2	0–1	2–0	2–1	2–2
Borussia Mönchengladbach	3–0	1–2	0–3	3–1	8–2	1–2	2–0	1–0	2–2	0–1	2–1	0–1	—	2–0	3–0	1–1	0–1	2–1
Bayern Munich	5–0	2–1	1–3	3–2	6–0	4–1	6–0	4–2	2–1	2–2	3–2	2–1	1–0	—	1–0	8–1	2–1	3–0
1. FC Nürnberg	2–1	0–0	0–0	1–1	2–2	1–3	2–0	3–2	4–0	1–2	2–1	1–1	3–0	0–3	—	1–1	0–0	3–1
Schalke 04	2–1	1–4	3–0	0–0	1–0	0–2	3–0	5–0	3–1	2–2	2–2	1–1	0–3	1–4	0–0	—	3–4	2–1
VfB Stuttgart	3–0	1–0	2–2	1–0	5–1	3–1	2–1	3–0	2–2	0–2	4–1	1–1	6–0	3–0	0–1	4–0	—	1–3
Bayer Uerdingen	3–1	1–2	2–1	3–0	1–1	1–0	5–1	3–1	4–2	1–1	4–1	1–1	2–4	0–0	0–2	5–2	2–5	—

Source: DFB
Legend: Blue = home team win; Yellow = draw; Red = away team win.

== Relegation play-offs ==
SV Waldhof Mannheim and third-placed 2. Bundesliga team SV Darmstadt 98 had to compete in a two-legged relegation/promotion play-off. After a two-leg series, both teams were tied 4–4 on aggregate, so a deciding third match had to be scheduled. Mannheim won this match in a penalty shootout and retained their Bundesliga status.

2 June 1988

SV Darmstadt 98	3–2	SV Waldhof Mannheim
Gutzler 63'; Posniak 66'; Gu 73'		Tsionanis 2'; Bührer 47'

Böllenfalltor, Darmstadt
Attendance: 28,000
Referee: Wolf-Rüdiger Umbach (Rottorf)

5 June 1988

SV Waldhof Mannheim	2–1	SV Darmstadt 98
Schön 20'; Lux 87'	Report link (in German)	Kuhl 88'

Südweststadion, Ludwigshafen
Attendance: 28,000
Referee: Aron Schmidhuber (Ottobrunn)

9 June 1988

SV Waldhof Mannheim	0–0 (a.e.t.)	SV Darmstadt 98
	Report link (in German)
Penalties
Lux (penalty scored); Bockenfeld (penalty missed); Bührer (penalty scored); Trieb (penalty missed); Cvetković (penalty scored); Quaisser (penalty scored); Klotz (penalty scored)	5–4	(penalty missed) Posniak; (penalty scored) Kuhl; (penalty scored) Schreml; (penalty scored) Gu; (penalty missed) Emig; (penalty scored) Scholz; (penalty missed) Bernecker

Ludwigspark, Saarbrücken
Attendance: 17,000
Referee: Gerhard Theobald (Neunkirchen (Saar))

== Top goalscorers ==
19 goals

- (Germany) Jürgen Klinsmann (VfB Stuttgart)

18 goals

- (Germany) Karl-Heinz Riedle (SV Werder Bremen)

17 goals

- (Germany) Lothar Matthäus (FC Bayern Munich)
- (Germany) Siegfried Reich (Hannover 96)

16 goals

- (Germany) Harald Kohr (1. FC Kaiserslautern)
- (Germany) Fritz Walter (VfB Stuttgart)

15 goals

- (Germany) Dieter Eckstein (1. FC Nürnberg)
- (Germany) Frank Ordenewitz (SV Werder Bremen)

14 goals

- (Germany) Olaf Thon (FC Schalke 04)

13 goals

- (Germany) Stefan Kuntz (Bayer 05 Uerdingen)
- (Germany) Uwe Leifeld (VfL Bochum)
- (Denmark) Flemming Povlsen (1. FC Köln)
- (Germany) Jürgen Wegmann (FC Bayern Munich)
- (Germany) Michael Zorc (Borussia Dortmund)

== Champion squad ==
SV Werder Bremen
Goalkeepers: Oliver Reck (32); Dieter Burdenski (3).

Defenders: Gunnar Sauer (33 / 2); Uli Borowka (31 / 1); Rune Bratseth (Norway) (31); Jonny Otten (30); Thomas Schaaf (29 / 1); Michael Kutzop (17 / 1); Matthias Ruländer (2).
Midfielders: Miroslav Votava (captain; 32 / 2); Günter Hermann (30); Norbert Meier (26 / 7); Thomas Wolter (16); Dieter Eilts (2); Benno Möhlmann (1).
Forwards: Karl-Heinz Riedle (33 / 18); Frank Ordenewitz (30 / 15); Manfred Burgsmüller (26 / 6); Frank Neubarth (22 / 6).
(league appearances and goals listed in brackets)

Manager: Otto Rehhagel.

On the roster but have not played in a league game: none.

== Attendances ==
No.	Team	Attendance	Change	Highest
1	Borussia Dortmund	29,424	-14.9%	54,000
2	Bayern München	28,034	-25.2%	77,573
3	1. FC Nürnberg	26,729	-0.1%	49,000
4	VfB Stuttgart	26,294	28.6%	70,705
5	Schalke 04	23,041	0.2%	61,200
6	1. FC Köln	22,412	35.1%	59,000
7	Werder Bremen	22,159	-3.1%	39,500
8	Karlsruher SC	21,629	111.8%	45,000
9	1. FC Kaiserslautern	21,505	-22.5%	36,923
10	Eintracht Frankfurt	21,287	15.1%	51,000
11	Hannover 96	20,967	12.3%	60,354
12	VfL Bochum	16,994	-4.7%	40,000
13	Hamburger SV	16,009	-33.9%	36,400
14	Waldhof Mannheim	14,392	1.5%	32,160
15	Borussia Mönchengladbach	14,249	-18.3%	34,000
16	Bayer 05 Uerdingen	10,712	-15.8%	18,000
17	Bayer Leverkusen	9,512	-25.3%	14,500
18	FC 08 Homburg	8,735	-12.6%	20,000
