= Matthias Ruländer =

German footballer and manager

Personal information
- Date of birth: 16 August 1964 (age 62)
- Place of birth: Germany
- Position: Centre-back

Youth career
- VfR Wilsche-Neubokel
- VfL Wolfsburg

Senior career*
Years	Team	Apps	(Gls)
1983–1988	Werder Bremen	24	(0)
1985	→ FC St. Pauli (loan)	20	(0)
1988–1989	Borussia Dortmund	11	(1)
1995–1996	Werder Bremen II	0	(0)
1996	Atlas Delmenhorst		
1997	TSV Ottersberg		

International career
1985	Germany U-21	1	(0)
- * Club domestic league appearances and goals

Matthias Ruländer (born 16 August 1964) is a German former professional footballer who played as a centre-back. He spent five seasons in the Bundesliga with SV Werder Bremen and Borussia Dortmund.

== Honours ==
- Bundesliga: 1987–88; runners-up 1985–86
- DFB-Pokal: 1988–89
