= Thomas Schaaf =

German footballer (born 1961)

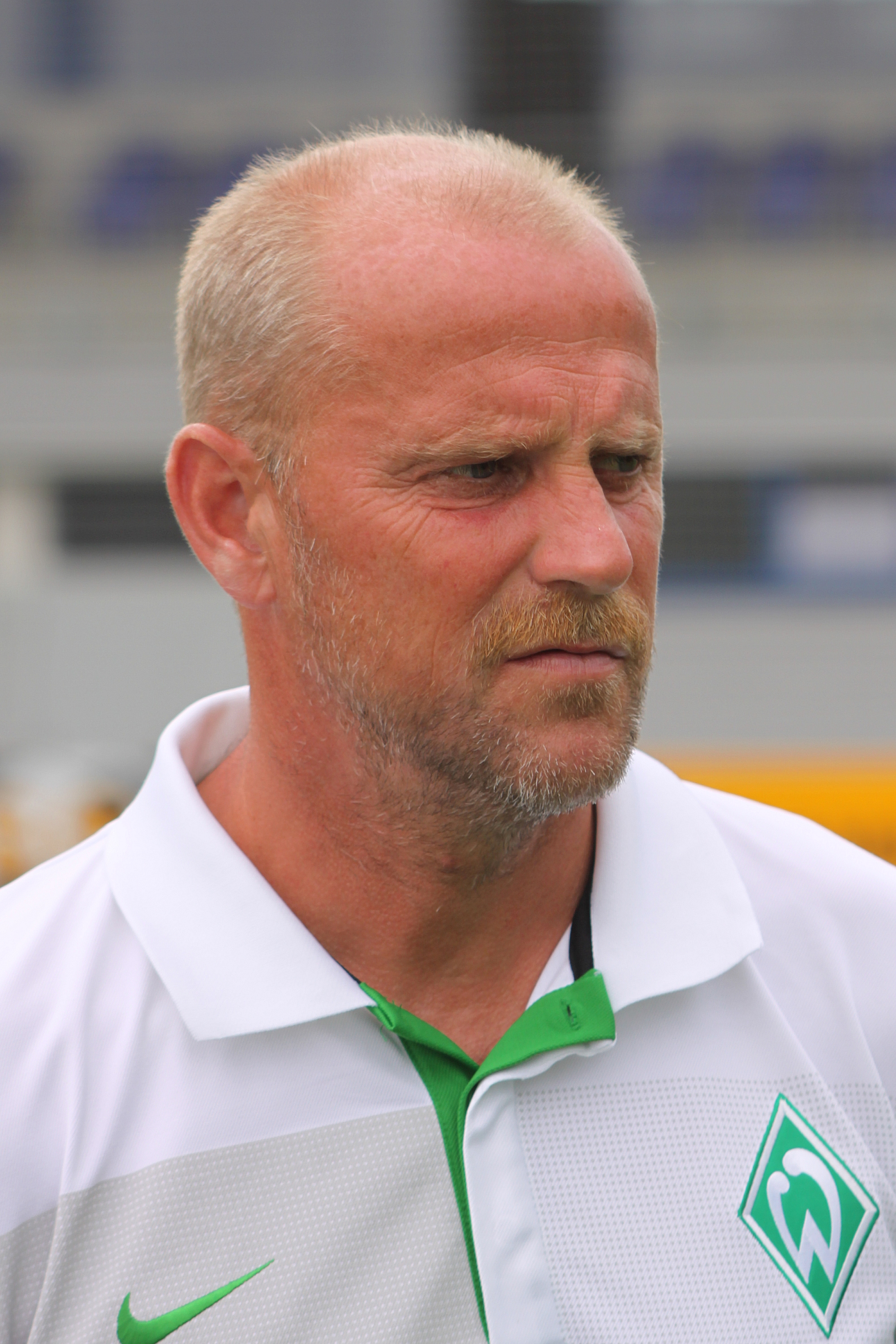
- Schaaf with Werder Bremen in 2009

Personal information
- Date of birth: 30 April 1961 (age 65)
- Place of birth: Mannheim, West Germany
- Height: 1.79 m (5 ft 10 in)
- Position: Right-back

Youth career
- BBV Union Bremen
- 1972–1978: Werder Bremen

Senior career*
Years	Team	Apps	(Gls)
1978–1980	Werder Bremen II	59	(0)
1978–1995	Werder Bremen	281	(14)
Total		340	(14)

Managerial career
- 1995–1999: Werder Bremen II
- 1999–2013: Werder Bremen
- 2014–2015: Eintracht Frankfurt
- 2015–2016: Hannover 96
- 2021: Werder Bremen (caretaker)
- * Club domestic league appearances and goals

Thomas Schaaf (born 30 April 1961) is a German professional football manager and former player who played as a defender. A "one-club man", Schaaf spent his entire playing career (1978–1995) and most of his managerial career with Bundesliga club Werder Bremen. He started coaching the team in 1999 and stepped down in 2013, being one of the longest-serving coaches in the Bundesliga. As a player, he won the Bundesliga (1988, 1993) and the DFB-Pokal (1991, 1994) twice and the UEFA Cup Winners' Cup (1992) once; as a manager, he won the Bundesliga once (2004) and the DFB-Pokal three times (1999, 2004, 2009).

== Playing career ==
Born in Mannheim, Schaaf arrived at Werder Bremen's youth academy in 1972, turning professional six years later. After a slow start with the first team, where he made only 21 league appearances in four years combined – 19 of them coming in 1980–81 in the second division – he eventually became an important squad member; he made his debut in the Bundesliga on 18 April 1979, in a 0–3 away loss against VfL Bochum.

Schaaf went on to play in 260 top flight games in the following seasons, eventually retiring in 1995 at the age of 34. During his time with his only club, he helped the Hanseatic club win two national championships (he was already a fringe player by the time of the 1993 conquest, appearing in only five matches) and as many DFB-Pokal. In the 1991–92 edition of the UEFA Cup Winners' Cup, he was on the bench in the final against AS Monaco FC, but replaced injured Thomas Wolter after 30 minutes in an eventual 2–0 win in Lisbon.

== Managerial career ==
=== 1987–2013: Werder Bremen ===
==== 1987–99: Early career ====
Schaaf began his managerial career while still an active player, taking care of Werder's youth sides. After this he proceeded to manage the reserve team which competed in the third-tier Regionalliga Nord, before succeeding Felix Magath on 10 May 1999 as the senior side's coach, with the club under serious threat of relegation until the last day of the season: he managed to steer the team clear out of relegation, going on to win the campaign's domestic cup immediately afterwards, defeating Bayern Munich in a penalty shoot-out.

==== 2000–04: Building up the team and "the Double" ====
Schaaf led Werder to the double (Bundesliga and DFB-Pokal) in 2003–04, as well as the team's first-ever DFB-Ligapokal two years later.

==== 2004–09: European adventures ====
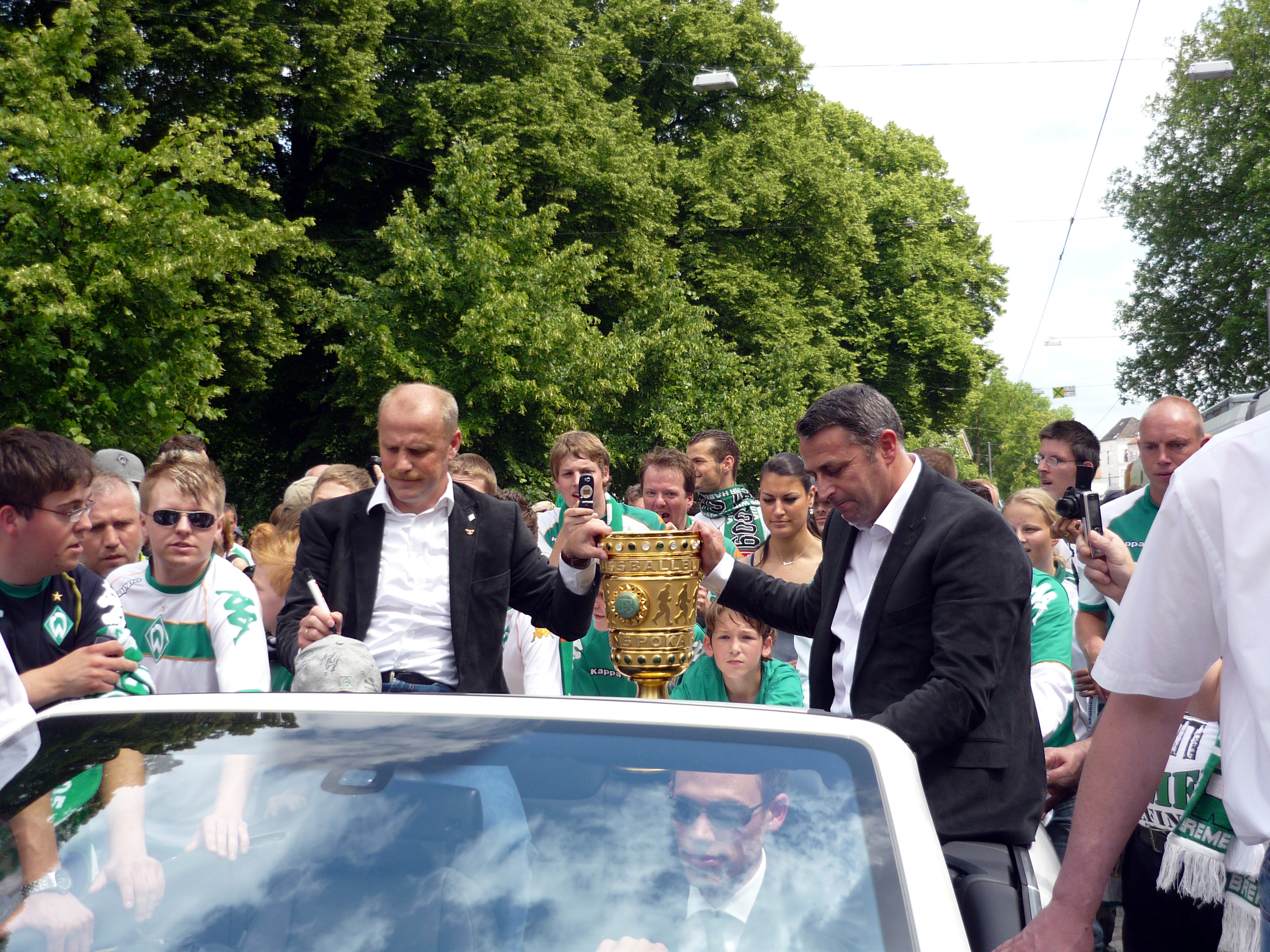
Schaaf (centre-left, holding trophy) celebrating the win of the 2009 DFB-Pokal

From 2004 the club managed to qualify five consecutive times for the UEFA Champions League, coming short in 2008–09 but winning the cup (his third as a manager – fifth overall – and Werder's sixth), thus qualifying for the following season's UEFA Europa League. That same season he also guided the club to the 2009 UEFA Cup Final, lost 1–2 to Shakhtar Donetsk after extra time.

==== 2009–13: Final seasons ====
On 14 December 2009, Schaaf signed a new contract with Werder Bremen. He led the side to the third place in the league and the playoff stages in the 2010–11 Champions League, as well as to a second straight German Cup final, which was lost to Bayern Munich.

Schaaf left Werder on 15 May 2013 by mutual consent after finishing a disappointing fourteenth in the domestic championship, ending 14 years in charge of the club and ending his 41-year association with the club since joining as an 11-year-old youth player. He oversaw 645 games as a coach during his stint, finishing with a record of 308 wins, 138 draws, and 199 losses and leading it to six major trophies and six appearances in the Champions League, and was linked to the organization for four decades since his days as a youth player. During the press conference where he announced his resignation, he spoke of his admiration of the club and the joy of his time spent at the Weserstadion, saying, "I had an extraordinary time here, connected with a lot of positive experiences and great successes. I would like to thank everyone who accompanied me along the way and supported me. I wish Werder Bremen a successful future."

=== 2014–16: Post-Werder Bremen years ===
==== 2014–15 season: Eintracht Frankfurt ====
On 21 May 2014, after one year out of football, Schaaf was appointed head coach of Eintracht Frankfurt, signing a two-year contract. During the course of his first season he led his team to a ninth-place finish, being in charge of his 500th Bundesliga match in the process. Schaaf resigned on 26 May 2015. His final match was a 2–1 win against Bayer Leverkusen. He finished with a record of 12 wins, 10 draws and 14 losses from 36 games and was ultimately succeeded by Armin Veh.

==== 2015–16 season: Hannover 96 ====
Schaaf was appointed as the head coach of Hannover 96 on 28 December 2015, signing an 18-month contract and being formally introduced to the media after his first training session on 4 January 2016. He took over a team that was in 17th place, after they took 14 points from a possible 51 when he was hired. His first match was a 2–1 home loss against SV Darmstadt 98. Hannover then failed to score a goal in their next four matches.

Schaaf was sacked on 3 April 2016, after a 3–0 defeat to Hamburger SV. He finished with a record of one win and ten losses. His first and only win was a 2–1 win over VfB Stuttgart on 27 February 2016, and Daniel Stendel took over for the rest of the season.

==== 2020–21 season: Brief return to Bremen ====
In May 2021, he returned to Bremen for one game, after Florian Kohfeldt was dismissed before the last matchday. On the last matchday, Bremen lost at home 4–2 against Borussia Mönchengladbach to finish 17th in the league table; hence, they were relegated to the 2. Bundesliga for the first time since the 1979–80 season.

== Career statistics ==
=== Club ===
Appearances and goals by club, season and competition
Club	Season	League			Cup (Note: Total includes two DFL-Supercup matches (1988, 1991))		Europe (Note: Includes UEFA Champions League, UEFA Cup Winners' Cup, UEFA Cup and European Super Cup)		Total	
Club	Season	Division	Apps	Goals	Apps	Goals	Apps	Goals	Apps	Goals
Werder Bremen	1978–79	Bundesliga	1	0	0	0	—		1	0
Werder Bremen	1979–80	Bundesliga	0	0	0	0	—		0	0
Werder Bremen	1980–81	2. Bundesliga	19	1	4	0	—		23	1
Werder Bremen	1981–82	Bundesliga	1	0	0	0	—		1	0
Werder Bremen	1982–83	Bundesliga	21	1	1	1	5	0	27	2
Werder Bremen	1983–84	Bundesliga	29	1	5	0	4	0	38	1
Werder Bremen	1984–85	Bundesliga	32	1	4	0	2	0	38	1
Werder Bremen	1985–86	Bundesliga	30	3	2	0	2	0	34	3
Werder Bremen	1986–87	Bundesliga	29	4	2	0	2	0	33	4
Werder Bremen	1987–88	Bundesliga	29	1	4	1	9	1	42	3
Werder Bremen	1988–89	Bundesliga	23	2	5	0	4	1	32	3
Werder Bremen	1989–90	Bundesliga	19	0	2	0	5	0	26	0
Werder Bremen	1990–91	Bundesliga	13	0	1	0	—		14	0
Werder Bremen	1991–92	Bundesliga	18	0	4	0	6	0	28	0
Werder Bremen	1992–93	Bundesliga	5	0	0	0	1	0	6	0
Werder Bremen	1993–94	Bundesliga	9	0	3	0	3	0	15	0
Werder Bremen	1994–95	Bundesliga	3	0	0	0	0	0	3	0
Career total			281	14	37	2	43	2	361	18

=== Manager ===
As of 22 May 2021

Team	From	To	Record								
Team	From	To	M	W	D	L	GF	GA	GD	Win %	Ref.
Werder Bremen II	1 July 1995	9 May 1999	137	64	30	43	277	187	+90	46.72	
Werder Bremen	10 May 1999	18 May 2013	672	321	141	210	1,218	903	+315	47.77	
Eintracht Frankfurt	21 May 2014	26 May 2015	36	12	10	14	59	64	−5	33.33	
Hannover 96	28 December 2015	3 April 2016	11	1	0	10	4	23	−19	9.09	
Werder Bremen	16 May 2021	30 June 2021	1	0	0	1	2	4	−2	0.00	
Total			857	398	181	278	1,560	1,181	+379	46.44	—

== Honours ==
=== Player ===
Werder Bremen

- Bundesliga: 1987–88, 1992–93
- DFB-Pokal: 1990–91, 1993–94; runner-up: 1988–89, 1989–90
- 2. Bundesliga: 1980–81
- DFL-Supercup: 1988, 1993, 1994; runner-up: 1991
- UEFA Cup Winners' Cup: 1991–92
- UEFA Super Cup runner-up: 1992

=== Manager ===
Werder Bremen

- Bundesliga: 2003–04
- DFB-Pokal: 1998–99, 2003–04, 2008–09; runner-up: 1999–2000, 2009–10
- DFB-Ligapokal: 2006; runner-up: 1999, 2004
- DFL-Supercup: 2009
- UEFA Cup runner-up: 2008–09

Individual

- German Football Manager of the Year: 2004

== See also ==
- List of one-club men
