= 1994 DFB-Supercup =

- Match programme cover
Bayern Munich	Werder Bremen
1	3
- After extra time
- Date: 7 August 1994
- Venue: Olympiastadion, Munich
- Referee: Bernd Heynemann (Magdeburg)
- Attendance: 22,000

The 1994 DFB-Supercup, known as the Panasonic DFB-Supercup for sponsorship purposes, was the eighth DFB-Supercup, an annual football match contested by the winners of the previous season's Bundesliga and DFB-Pokal competitions.

The match was played at the Olympiastadion, Munich, and contested by league champions Bayern Munich and cup winners Werder Bremen.

== Teams ==
Team	Qualification	Previous appearances (bold indicates winners)
Bayern Munich	1993–94 Bundesliga champions	3 (**1987**, 1989, **1990**)
Werder Bremen^{TH}	1993–94 DFB-Pokal winners	3 (**1988**, 1991 Final, **1993**)

== Match ==
=== Details ===
7 August 1994
20:15 CEST

Bayern Munich	1–3 (a.e.t.)	Werder Bremen
Nerlinger 65'	Report	Beschastnykh 2'; Schulz 104'; Rufer 116'

Olympiastadion, Munich
Attendance: 22,000
Referee: Bernd Heynemann (Magdeburg)

**Bayern Munich**	**Werder Bremen**

GK	1	(Germany) Oliver Kahn
SW	10	(Germany) Lothar Matthäus (c)
CB	4	(Germany) Oliver Kreuzer	(red card) 21'
CB	5	(Germany) Thomas Helmer
RWB	3	(Germany) Michael Sternkopf
LWB	2	(Germany) Dieter Frey
DM	8	(Germany) Markus Schupp
CM	11	(Germany) Mehmet Scholl
CM	6	(Germany) Christian Nerlinger
CF	9	(France) Jean-Pierre Papin		(substituted off) 60'
CF	7	(Switzerland) Alain Sutter		(substituted off) 38'
Substitutes:
MF	14	(Germany) Dietmar Hamann		(substituted on) 60'
FW	15	(Colombia) Adolfo Valencia		(substituted on) 38'
Manager:
(Italy) Giovanni Trapattoni

GK	1	(Germany) Oliver Reck
SW	4	(Egypt) Hany Ramzy
CB	3	(Germany) Dietmar Beiersdorfer
CB	2	(Germany) Michael Schulz
CM	5	(Germany) Miroslav Votava (c)
CM	6	(Germany) Uli Borowka	(substituted off) 67'
CM	7	(Germany) Dieter Eilts
RW	11	(Germany) Mario Basler
AM	10	(Austria) Andi Herzog
LW	8	(Germany) Marco Bode
CF	9	(Russia) Vladimir Beschastnykh	(substituted off) 46'
Substitutes:
DF	13	(Germany) Thomas Wolter	(substituted on) 67'
FW	14	(New Zealand) Wynton Rufer	(substituted on) 46'
Manager:
(Germany) Otto Rehhagel

== See also ==
- 1994–95 Bundesliga
- 1994–95 DFB-Pokal
