= Wynton Rufer =

New Zealand footballer (born 1962)

Wynton Rufer CNZM
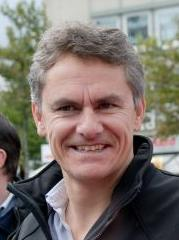
- Rufer in 2009

Personal information
- Full name: Wynton Alan Whai Rufer
- Date of birth: 29 December 1962 (age 63)
- Place of birth: Wellington, New Zealand
- Position: Striker

Senior career*
Years	Team	Apps	(Gls)
1980	Stop Out	5	(2)
1981	Wellington Diamond	19	(7)
1982	Norwich City	0	(0)
1982	Miramar Rangers	8	(3)
1982–1986	FC Zürich	100	(43)
1986–1988	FC Aarau	37	(18)
1988–1989	Grasshoppers	22	(12)
1989–1995	Werder Bremen	174	(59)
1995–1996	JEF United	54	(38)
1997	1. FC Kaiserslautern	14	(4)
1997	Central United	30	(12)
1998	North Shore United	11	(3)
1999–2002	Auckland Kingz	48	(12)
Total		522	(213)

International career
1980–1997	New Zealand	23	(12)

Managerial career
- 1998–1999: North Shore
- 1999: New Zealand U16
- 1999–2002: Kingz
- 2014–2015: Papua New Guinea
- * Club domestic league appearances and goals

Wynton Alan Whai Rufer CNZM (born 29 December 1962) is a New Zealand retired professional footballer who played as a striker. He spent more than a decade of his professional career in Switzerland and Germany, achieving his greatest success at Werder Bremen, where he won a total of four major titles and finished the top scorer in the 1993–94 UEFA Champions League. He was also a member of the New Zealand national team in its first FIFA World Cup appearance in 1982. He was named the Oceania Footballer of the Century by the Oceania Football Confederation.

== Club career ==
=== Early career ===
Rufer was born in Wellington to a Swiss father, Arthur Rufer, and a New Zealand Māori mother, Anne Hine Rufer (née Campbell). He affiliates to the Ngāti Porou iwi. After leaving the city's Rongotai College, he played his first football for Wellington Diamond United, Stop Out and Miramar Rangers.

After being voted New Zealand's Young Player of the Year in 1981 and 1982, Rufer attracted the attention of Norwich City manager Ken Brown, who invited the player and his older brother Shane Rufer to Norfolk for a trial. He impressed and signed a professional contract on 23 October 1981, becoming the first Kiwi to do so. However, he was denied a work permit to play in England, so he joined FC Zürich in May of the following year.

=== Switzerland ===
Rufer would play in Switzerland in the following seven years, also representing FC Aarau and Grasshoppers: whilst at the former, he topped the scoring charts at 21 in the 1987–88 season, helping his club to the fourth place. With the Hoppers, he won the Swiss Cup, defeating Aarau in the final, and surpassed the 100-goal mark in his years in the country.

=== Werder Bremen ===
In the 1989 summer, Rufer signed with Werder Bremen, coached by Otto Rehhagel. His Bundesliga debut came on 29 July, in a 0–0 draw at FC St. Pauli, and his impact was immediate, as he netted six times in his first 13 league matches. Overall, he would play an enormous part in the side's achievements, pairing with Klaus Allofs up front: on 6 May 1992, both scored in the final of the season's UEFA Cup Winners' Cup, in Lisbon (2–0 win against Monaco).

In the 1992–93 league season, as Werder won the third championship in the club's history, Rufer finished second in the scoring charts, at 17. On 8 December 1993, he scored two against Anderlecht in the UEFA Champions League, in a 5–3 home win (Anderlecht led 3–0 with 25 minutes to go); he finished as that competition's topscorer, alongside Barcelona's Ronald Koeman, and added his second German Cup.

Rufer was voted Oceania's Player of the Year in 1989, 1990 and 1992.

=== Later years ===
In 1994–95, the 31-year-old left Bremen and moved to JEF United Ichihara of the J1 League, finishing as the club's leading scorer in his second year. When Rehhagel took on the task of resurrecting 1. FC Kaiserslautern's fortunes in 1996 – the club would eventually return to the top division, as champions – he called upon Rufer in February 1997, and he contributed with four goals in 14 second division matches.

Rufer returned to his country and successively represented Central United, North Shore United and Auckland Kingz, retiring at the age of nearly 40. He then founded a football coaching school, WYNRS, which produced football stars such as women's international Annalie Longo.

With his brother Shane, Rufer took on player-coaching duties at North Shore United in 1998, before coaching the national Under-16 men's squad ahead of the 1999 Junior World Cup Finals, notably achieving a draw against the Under-16 men's teams of Austria and win over Norway in an unofficial U-16 World Cup tournament in Nice, France in 1998. He was appointed player-coach of the country's first professional football team, Auckland Kingz, participating in the Australian Soccer League for two seasons before retiring in 2001, having been named Oceania's Player of the Century ahead of Frank Farina (Australia) and Christian Karembeu (France, of New Caledonia descent).

== International career ==
Made his A-international debut for New Zealand against Kuwait on 16 October 1980 in the friendly international Merdeka Tournament in Malaysia aged 17 years and 291 days. Added late to the squad for New Zealand in their World Cup qualification campaign in 1981 and played his first World Cup qualifier on 14 December 1981 against Kuwait, aged 18, scoring in a 2–2 draw for the 1982 FIFA World Cup qualifiers, Rufer quickly established himself in the All Whites side. Late in the following year, he netted the 2–1 winner in the decisive playoff against China, which propelled the nation to its first World Cup ever.

In the final stages in Spain, 19-year-old Rufer was the youngest member of the squad, appearing in all three group losses, against Scotland, the Soviet Union and Brazil. In total, he gained 23 full caps, scoring 12 goals. From 1985 to 1989, he only collected a total of five international appearances, namely due to the fact Zürich would not release him; from there until 1996, he did not appear for the national side at all.

== Managerial career ==
In February 2014, Rufer was appointed manager of Papua New Guinea. He was also responsible for managing Papua New Guinea U19 at the 2014 OFC U-20 Championship.

== Personal life ==
During his time in Switzerland, Rufer converted to Christianity and married his wife, Lisa, in 1986. They have two sons, Caleb and Joshua, who are also footballers. His brother Shane and his nephew Alex also played professional football and played for the New Zealand national team.

== Career statistics ==
=== Club ===
Appearances and goals by club, season and competition
Club	Season	League			National cup (Note: Includes Swiss Cup, DFB-Pokal, Emperor's Cup)		Continental		Other		Total	
Club	Season	Division	Apps	Goals	Apps	Goals	Apps	Goals	Apps	Goals	Apps	Goals
Stop Out	1980	National Soccer League	5	2			–		–		5	2
Wellington Diamond United	1981	National Soccer League	19	7			–		–		19	7
Miramar Rangers	1982	National Soccer League	8	3			–		–		8	3
FC Zürich	1982–83	Nationalliga A	23	9	4	2	7 (Note: Appearances in UEFA Cup)	1	–		34	12
FC Zürich	1983–84	Nationalliga A	22	8	4	2	3	1	–		29	11
FC Zürich	1984–85	Nationalliga A	22	10	3	3	5	1	–		30	14
FC Zürich	1985–86	Nationalliga A	28	14	1	1	5	1	–		34	16
FC Zürich	1986–87	Nationalliga A	5	2	0	0	4	2	–		9	4
FC Zürich	Total		100	43	12	8	24	6	0	0	136	57
FC Aarau	1986–87	Nationalliga A	19	10			0	0	–		19	10
FC Aarau	1987–88	Nationalliga A	36	20			0	0	–		36	20
FC Aarau	Total		55	30			0	0	–		55	30
Grasshoppers	1988–89	Nationalliga A	36	18			2 (Note: Appearances in European Cup Winners' Cup)	0	–		38	18
Werder Bremen	1989–90	Bundesliga	34	10	5	5	10	4	–		49	19
Werder Bremen	1990–91	Bundesliga	33	15	6	4	–		–		39	19
Werder Bremen	1991–92	Bundesliga	29	5	4	1	8	4	2 (Note: Appearance(s) in DFL-Supercup)	2	43	12
Werder Bremen	1992–93	Bundesliga	32	17	5	5	4	4	1 (Note: Appearance in UEFA Super Cup)	1	42	27
Werder Bremen	1993–94	Bundesliga	33	10	6	5	10 (Note: Appearances in UEFA Champions League)	8	1	1	50	24
Werder Bremen	1994–95	Bundesliga	13	2	3	0	1	0	1	1	18	3
Werder Bremen	Total		174	59	29	20	33	20	5	5	241	104
JEF United	1995	J1 League	39	21	1	1	–		–		40	22
JEF United	1996	J1 League	10	4	–		–		2 (Note: Two appearances in J.League Cup)	0	12	4
JEF United	Total		49	25	1	1	0	0	2	0	52	26
1. FC Kaiserslautern	1996–97	2. Bundesliga	14	4	0	0	–		–		14	4
Central United	1996–97	National Soccer League	30	12	1	1	–		(Note: Appearances in Northern League)		30	12
North Shore United	1997–98	National Soccer League	11	3			–		(Note: Appearances in Northern League Division Three)		11	3
Auckland Kingz	1999–2000	National Soccer League	25	6	–		–		–		25	6
Auckland Kingz	2000–01	National Soccer League	18	6	–		–		–		18	6
Auckland Kingz	2001–02	National Soccer League	5	0	–		–		–		5	0
Auckland Kingz	Total		103	31	–		–		–		103	31
Career total			568	235	41	28	59	26	7	5	673	294

=== International ===
Appearances and goals by national team and year
National team	Year	Apps	Goals
New Zealand	1980	4	0
New Zealand	1981	2	3
New Zealand	1982	6	2
New Zealand	1983	0	0
New Zealand	1984	0	0
New Zealand	1985	3	1
New Zealand	1986	0	0
New Zealand	1987	0	0
New Zealand	1988	1	0
New Zealand	1989	1	0
New Zealand	1990	0	0
New Zealand	1991	0	0
New Zealand	1992	0	0
New Zealand	1993	0	0
New Zealand	1994	0	0
New Zealand	1995	0	0
New Zealand	1996	3	2
New Zealand	1997	3	4
Total		23	12

Key
‡	Indicates goal was scored from a penalty kick

List of international goals scored by Wynton Rufer
No.	Date	Venue	Opponent	Score	Result	Competition
1	10 October 1981	Mount Smart Stadium, Auckland, New Zealand	Kuwait	1–0	1–2	1982 FIFA World Cup qualification
2	19 December 1981	Prince Faisal bin Fahd Stadium, Riyadh, Saudi Arabia	Saudi Arabia	2–0	5–0	1982 FIFA World Cup qualification
3	19 December 1981	Prince Faisal bin Fahd Stadium, Riyadh, Saudi Arabia	Saudi Arabia	5–0	5–0	1982 FIFA World Cup qualification
4	10 January 1982	National Stadium, Singapore	China	2–0	2–1	1982 FIFA World Cup qualification
5	10 January 1982	Queen Elizabeth II Park, Christchurch, New Zealand	Hungary	1–1	1–2	Friendly
6	26 October 1985	Mount Smart Stadium, Auckland, New Zealand	Israel	1–0	3–1	1986 FIFA World Cup qualification
7	5 October 1996	Doha, Qatar	Qatar	?–?	2–3	Friendly
8	5 October 1996	Doha, Qatar	Qatar	?–?	2–3	Friendly
9	11 June 1997	North Harbour Stadium, Auckland, New Zealand	Papua New Guinea	3–0	7–0	1998 FIFA World Cup qualification
10	11 June 1997	North Harbour Stadium, Auckland, New Zealand	Papua New Guinea	4–0	7–0	1998 FIFA World Cup qualification
11	18 June 1997	North Harbour Stadium, Auckland, New Zealand	Fiji	1–0	5–0	1998 FIFA World Cup qualification
12	18 June 1997	North Harbour Stadium, Auckland, New Zealand	Fiji	3–0	5–0	1998 FIFA World Cup qualification

== Honours ==
Grasshoppers

- Swiss Cup: 1988–89
- Swiss Super Cup: 1989

Werder Bremen

- Bundesliga: 1992–93
- DFB-Pokal: 1990–91, 1993–94
- DFB-Supercup: 1993, 1994
- UEFA Cup Winners Cup: 1991–92

1. FC Kaiserslautern

- 2. Bundesliga: 1996–97

Central United

- Chatham Cup: 1997

Individual

- New Zealand Young Player of the Year: 1981 and 1982
- Oceania Footballer of the Year: 1989, 1990, 1992
- FIFA Oceania Footballer of the Century
- UEFA Champions League Top-scorer: 1993–94
- Companion of the New Zealand Order of Merit, for services to soccer, in the 2008 Queen's Birthday Honours
- New Zealand Sports Hall of Fame: Inducted in 2005
- Maori Sports Hall of Fame: Inducted in 2007
- Rufer is a member of the FIFA Football Committee, with Franz Beckenbauer, Michel Platini and Bobby Charlton. He is also involved with the FIFA Ambassadors Against Racism Committee.
- IFFHS Legends
- IFFHS Oceania Men's Team of All Time: 2021
