= 1989–90 DFB-Pokal =

Tournament details
- Country: West Germany
- Teams: 64

Final positions
- Champions: 1. FC Kaiserslautern
- Runners-up: Werder Bremen

Tournament statistics
- Matches played: 66
- Top goal scorer(s): Uwe Kober; Wynton Rufer; Stefan Kuntz (5 goals)

The 1989–90 DFB-Pokal was the 47th season of the annual German football cup competition. It began on 19 August 1989 and ended on 19 May 1990. 64 teams competed in the tournament of six rounds. In the final 1. FC Kaiserslautern defeated Werder Bremen 3–2.

== Matches ==
=== First round ===
19 August 1989
Hannover 96	0–3	Borussia Mönchengladbach
VfL Wolfsburg	1–3	VfB Stuttgart
VfL Osnabrück	3–1	FC Schalke 04	(AET)
SV Wiesbaden	0–2	VfL Bochum

20 August 1989
VfL Bückeburg	0–2	Eintracht Braunschweig
Rot-Weiß Frankfurt	0–1	SV Waldhof Mannheim
Arminia Hannover	2–1	FC 08 Homburg
FC St. Pauli	1–2	SV Werder Bremen
Kickers Offenbach	2–1	Bayer Uerdingen
VfR Sölde	0–3	1. FC Köln
Eintracht Frankfurt	0–1	FC Bayern Munich
Hamburger SV	2–4	MSV Duisburg
Bayer 04 Leverkusen II	0–1	1. FC Kaiserslautern
Hertha Zehlendorf	0–4	1. FC Nürnberg
SpVgg Plattling	1–2	Fortuna Düsseldorf	(AET)
1. FC Saarbrücken	3–1	SV Meppen
Rot-Weiss Essen	1–2	SG Wattenscheid 09
SV Langenau	0–6	Stuttgarter Kickers
SC Jülich 1910	2–2	Blau-Weiß 90 Berlin	(AET)
FC Wangen	0–3	SV Darmstadt 98
1. FC Pforzheim	4–1	SpVgg Bayreuth
FC Schweinfurt 05	1–0	Altonaer FC 93
TSG Pfeddersheim	2–0	VfB Gaggenau
SC Geislingen	0–3	TSV 1860 Munich
SV Edenkoben	1–0	SV Saar 05 Saarbrücken
Borussia Dortmund	3–0	SC Fortuna Köln
SV Werder Bremen II	1–4	Bayer 04 Leverkusen
SG Union Solingen	1–3	SC Freiburg	(AET)
FC Gütersloh	1–1	Hertha BSC	(AET)
FSV Salmrohr	1–3	TuS Hoisdorf
Viktoria Aschaffenburg	2–6	Karlsruher SC
1. FSV Mainz 05	2–0	Alemannia Aachen

==== Replays ====
27 August 1989
Blau-Weiß 90 Berlin	1–0	SC Jülich 1910
Hertha BSC	0–1	FC Gütersloh

=== Second round ===
23 September 1989
Borussia Mönchengladbach	4–1	FC St. Pauli
FC Bayern Munich	2–0	SV Waldhof Mannheim
SC Freiburg	1–2	Karlsruher SC
SV Darmstadt 98	1–0	Bayer 04 Leverkusen
Stuttgarter Kickers	2–3	SV Werder Bremen
Borussia Dortmund	2–3	Eintracht Braunschweig
Fortuna Düsseldorf	4–0	1. FC Saarbrücken
1. FC Pforzheim	1–0	VfL Bochum
Arminia Hannover	2–4	1. FC Köln
1. FSV Mainz 05	1–3	1. FC Kaiserslautern
FC Gütersloh	0–2	VfB Stuttgart	(AET)
SG Wattenscheid 09	0–2	VfL Osnabrück
SV Edenkoben	1–2	MSV Duisburg	(AET)
FC Schweinfurt 05	4–2	Blau-Weiß 90 Berlin
TSG Pfeddersheim	1–3	Kickers Offenbach
TuS Hoisdorf	0–2	TSV 1860 München

=== Round of 16 ===
9 November 1989
TSV 1860 Munich	1–2	SV Werder Bremen
1. FC Kaiserslautern	2–1	1. FC Köln
VfB Stuttgart	3–0	FC Bayern Munich
Kickers Offenbach	1–0	Borussia Mönchengladbach	(AET)
FC Schweinfurt 05	0–2	Eintracht Braunschweig
1. FC Pforzheim	1–3	Fortuna Düsseldorf
MSV Duisburg	4–1	Darmstadt 98
VfL Osnabrück	3–2	Karlsruher SC

=== Quarter-finals ===
12 December 1989
SV Werder Bremen	3–0	VfB Stuttgart
1. FC Kaiserslautern	3–1	Fortuna Düsseldorf
Eintracht Braunschweig	3–2	VfL Osnabrück
Kickers Offenbach	1–1	MSV Duisburg	(AET)

==== Replay ====
1 February 1990
MSV Duisburg	0–1	Kickers Offenbach

=== Semi-finals ===
1 April 1990
SV Werder Bremen	2–0	Eintracht Braunschweig
Kickers Offenbach	0–1	1. FC Kaiserslautern

=== Final ===
19 May 1990
18:00 CEST

1. FC Kaiserslautern	3–2	Werder Bremen
Labbadia 19', 26'; Kuntz 30'	Report	Neubarth 54'; Burgsmüller 72'

Olympiastadion, West Berlin
Attendance: 76,391
Referee: Manfred Neuner (Leimen)
