= Kay Wenschlag =

German footballer

Personal information
- Date of birth: 25 February 1970 (age 56)
- Place of birth: East Berlin, East Germany
- Position: Defender

Youth career
- Berliner FC Dynamo
- –1988: Rotation Berlin
- 1988–1989: Rotation Leipzig

Senior career*
Years	Team	Apps	(Gls)
1989–1990	Stahl Brandenburg	5	(0)
1990–1991	Rotation Leipzig		
1991–1994	Werder Bremen (A)		
1991–1994	Werder Bremen	0	(0)
1994–1995	Hansa Rostock	1	(0)
1995–1998	Energie Cottbus	28	(1)
1998–2001	VfL Osnabrück	60	(1)
2001–2002	Holstein Kiel	26	(0)
2002–2009	FC Schüttorf 09		
Total		120	(2)
- * Club domestic league appearances and goals

Kay Wenschlag (born 25 February 1970) is a German former professional footballer who played as a defender.
