= Marco Bode =

German footballer (born 1969)

Personal information
- Date of birth: 23 July 1969 (age 57)
- Place of birth: Osterode am Harz, West Germany
- Height: 1.89 m (6 ft 2 in)
- Positions: Winger; forward

Team information
- Current team: Werder Bremen (chairman)

Youth career
- –1988: VfR Osterode

Senior career*
Years	Team	Apps	(Gls)
1988–1990	Werder Bremen (A)	42	(19)
1989–2002	Werder Bremen	379	(101)
Total		421	(120)

International career
1989	West Germany U21	4	(2)
1995–2002	Germany	40	(9)
Medal record
Men's football
Representing Germany
FIFA World Cup
Runner-up	2002 Korea and Japan
UEFA European Championship
Winner	1996 England
- * Club domestic league appearances and goals

Marco Bode (born 23 July 1969) is a German former professional footballer. A one club man, Bode spent his entire professional career at Werder Bremen. He played as a left winger and forward.

== Club career ==
Bode played his first football with home club VfR Osterode, before moving to the amateur team of Werder Bremen in 1988. He was discovered by Otto Rehhagel and soon moved to the professional team.

Between 1989 and 2002 he was active in 379 games for Werder, in which he scored 101 goals, making him the then-record Bremen goal-scorer. He has since been overtaken by fellow Werder Bremen legend Claudio Pizarro. Despite some offers by major European clubs such as Bayern Munich, he remained loyal to Werder Bremen, retiring somewhat early after the 2002 World Cup. Bode also won renown because he was a particularly fair and decent player who only was booked ten times in his entire Bundesliga career and never got sent off. He was also known for his smart, sundry TV interviews. The 1999–2000 season was his most successful, seeing him score 18 goals for his club and four for Germany.

== International career ==
In the seven years following 1995, Bode also played in 40 games for the Germany national team, scoring nine goals. He took part in the UEFA Euro 1996 final and in the final of the 2002 FIFA World Cup. At the World Cup, Bode was a surprise substitution from manager Rudi Völler in the crucial third group match against Cameroon with the match still at 0–0. Normally a forward, Bode was selected by Völler as an attacking left wing-back in his favoured 3-5-2 formation. Being close to retirement, the German fans felt Bode's selection was dubious, however he silenced the doubters by scoring the opening goal of an eventual 2–0 win for Germany propelling them into the knockout stages as group winners. It would be Bode's final goal and he made his last appearance in the World Cup final as Germany fell to Brazil.

== Career statistics ==
=== Club ===
Appearances and goals by club, season and competition
Club	Season	League			Cup		Continental		Other		Total		Ref.
Club	Season	Division	Apps	Goals	Apps	Goals	Apps	Goals	Apps	Goals	Apps	Goals	Ref.
Werder Bremen II	1988–89	Oberliga Nord	33	16	0	0	–		–		33	16	
Werder Bremen II	1989–90	Oberliga Nord	9	3	1	1	–		–		10	4	
Werder Bremen II	Total		42	19	1	1	0	0	0	0	43	20	–
Werder Bremen	1989–90	Bundesliga	20	4	2	1	4	2	0	0	26	7	
Werder Bremen	1990–91	Bundesliga	25	3	6	1	0	0	0	0	31	4	
Werder Bremen	1991–92	Bundesliga	32	12	4	0	9	3	1 (Note: One appearance in DFL-Supercup)	0	46	15	
Werder Bremen	1992–93	Bundesliga	29	4	5	3	4	0	2 (Note: Two appearances in UEFA Super Cup)	0	40	7	
Werder Bremen	1993–94	Bundesliga	32	7	5	1	10	4	1	0	48	12	
Werder Bremen	1994–95	Bundesliga	33	14	1	0	4	1	1	0	39	15	
Werder Bremen	1995–96	Bundesliga	34	5	3	1	6	3	0	0	43	9	
Werder Bremen	1996–97	Bundesliga	33	10	3	1	0	0	0	0	36	11	
Werder Bremen	1997–98	Bundesliga	28	9	0	0	0	0	0	0	28	9	
Werder Bremen	1998–99	Bundesliga	29	8	6	1	4	0	0	0	39	9	
Werder Bremen	1999–00	Bundesliga	27	13	4	1	9	3	1 (Note: One appearance and one goal in DFL-Ligapokal)	1	41	18	
Werder Bremen	2000–01	Bundesliga	26	5	2	0	6	2	0	0	34	7	
Werder Bremen	2001–02	Bundesliga	31	7	1	0	2	0	0	0	34	7	
Werder Bremen	Total		379	101	42	10	58	18	6	1	485	130	–
Career total			421	120	43	11	58	18	6	1	528	150	–

=== International ===
Appearances and goals by national team and year
National team	Year	Apps	Goals
Germany	1995	1	0
Germany	1996	7	0
Germany	1998	1	0
Germany	1999	8	4
Germany	2000	9	1
Germany	2001	6	1
Germany	2002	8	3
Total		40	9

Scores and results list Germany's goal tally first, score column indicates score after each Bode goal.

List of international goals scored by Marco Bode
No.	Date	Venue	Opponent	Score	Result	Competition
1	9 February 1999	Miami Orange Bowl, Miami, United States	Colombia	3–2	3–3	Friendly
2	27 March 1999	Windsor Park, Belfast, Northern Ireland	Northern Ireland	1–0	3–0	UEFA Euro 2000 qualifying
3	27 March 1999	Windsor Park, Belfast, Northern Ireland	Northern Ireland	2–0	3–0	UEFA Euro 2000 qualifying
4	4 June 1999	BayArena, Leverkusen, Germany	Moldova	3–0	6–1	UEFA Euro 2000 qualifying
5	7 June 2000	Dreisamstadion, Freiburg, Germany	Liechtenstein	3–2	8–2	Friendly
6	28 March 2001	Olympic Stadium, Athens, Greece	Greece	4–2	4–2	2002 FIFA World Cup qualifying
7	18 May 2002	BayArena, Leverkusen, Germany	Austria	3–0	6–2	Friendly
8	18 May 2002	BayArena, Leverkusen, Germany	Austria	5–2	6–2	Friendly
9	11 June 2002	Ecopa Stadium, Shizuoka, Japan	Cameroon	1–0	2–0	2002 FIFA World Cup

== Honours ==
Werder Bremen

- Bundesliga: 1992–93
- DFB-Pokal: 1990–91, 1993–94, 1998–99
- DFB-Supercup: 1988, 1993, 1994
- UEFA Cup Winners' Cup: 1991–92
- UEFA Super Cup runner-up: 1992
- UEFA Intertoto Cup: 1997–98

Germany

- UEFA European Championship: 1996
- FIFA World Cup runner-up: 2002

Individual

- Werder Bremen's most successful Bundesliga scorer: 2nd with 101 goals
- Werder Bremen's Bundesliga players with most appearances: 4th with 379 appearances
- Werder Bremen's player with most international matches: 4th with 40 caps
