= Miroslav Votava =

German footballer (born 1956)

Mirko Votava
Personal information
- Full name: Miroslav Votava
- Date of birth: 25 April 1956 (age 70)
- Place of birth: Prague, Czechoslovakia
- Height: 1.81 m (5 ft 11 in)
- Position: Defensive midfielder

Youth career
- Dukla Prague
- 1968–1973: VfL Witten
- 1973–1974: Borussia Dortmund

Senior career*
Years	Team	Apps	(Gls)
1974–1982	Borussia Dortmund	257	(28)
1982–1985	Atlético Madrid	96	(9)
1985–1996	Werder Bremen	357	(18)
1997–1998	VfB Oldenburg	15	(0)
Total		725	(55)

International career
1979–1981	West Germany	5	(0)

Managerial career
- 1997–1998: VfB Oldenburg
- 1998–1999: SV Meppen
- 2002–2004: Union Berlin
- 2017: Werder Bremen II (interim)
Medal record
Representing West Germany
UEFA European Championship
Winner	1980 Italy
- * Club domestic league appearances and goals

Miroslav "Mirko" Votava (born 25 April 1956) is a former professional footballer and manager.

A defensive midfielder of stamina and tactical awareness, he appeared in 546 matches in the Bundesliga, fourth in the all-time list at the time of his retirement. Most of his extensive career was spent at Werder Bremen, with which he won a total of five titles; he also played eight seasons with Borussia Dortmund and three in Spain with Atlético Madrid.

Born in Czechoslovakia, Votava represented West Germany at Euro 1980.

== Club career ==
=== Borussia Dortmund ===
Born in Prague, Czechoslovakia, Votava started out at local FK Dukla. However, his parents left the country during the Prague Spring, settling first in Australia then West Germany, in Witten. He began playing professionally with Borussia Dortmund in 1974, with the club in the 2. Bundesliga.

Scoring three goals in 22 games in his first season in the Bundesliga, Votava was an undisputed starter onwards. He only missed three matches from 1977 to 1982, although he failed to win any silverware.

=== Atlético Madrid ===
Votava subsequently moved to Atlético Madrid for 58 million pesetas. He was instrumental for the Colchoneros during his three-year spell, always finishing in the top four in La Liga and also lifting the Copa del Rey in 1985.

=== Werder Bremen ===
Votava returned to West Germany aged 29, signing with SV Werder Bremen where he would spend a further 11 campaigns and rarely missed a game. He helped the side to the 1991–92 edition of the UEFA Cup Winners' Cup and two league titles (to which he contributed a total of 65 matches and five goals). On 24 August 1996, aged 40 years and 121 days, he became the league's oldest scorer in history, netting in a 2–1 loss at VfB Stuttgart; the record lasted until 16 February 2019, when Claudio Pizarro (aged 40 years and 136 days) scored against Hertha BSC.

As he was understandably slowing down, Votava left Bremen during the 1997 January transfer window, joining second-tier VfB Oldenburg and retiring at the end of the season, with his team finishing last. Over a 24-year senior career, he was never sent off; when asked about this disciplinary record, he stated: "I tried to win the ball without committing a foul."

Votava then moved into coaching, starting with last club Oldenburg then moving to SV Meppen, both in the regional leagues. From late 2002 to early 2004, he took the reins of 1. FC Union Berlin of the second division, following which he returned to Werder as a youth coach (he had previously worked with them as a scout).

== International career ==
Votava chose to represent West Germany internationally, and made his debut on 21 November 1979, playing 15 minutes in a 3–1 friendly away victory over the Soviet Union. He appeared in a further four internationals, including UEFA Euro 1980's group stage match against Greece (0–0) as the national side won the tournament.

== Honours ==
Atlético Madrid

- Copa del Rey: 1984–85

Werder Bremen

- Bundesliga: 1987–88, 1992–93
- DFB-Pokal: 1990–91, 1993–94; runner-up: 1988–89, 1989–90
- UEFA Cup Winners' Cup: 1991–92
- DFL-Supercup: 1988, 1993, 1994

West Germany

- UEFA European Championship: 1980
