= Hans-Jürgen Gundelach =

German footballer

Personal information
- Date of birth: 29 November 1963 (age 62)
- Place of birth: Gelnhausen, Germany
- Height: 1.90 m (6 ft 3 in)
- Position: Goalkeeper

Senior career*
Years	Team	Apps	(Gls)
1984–1989	Eintracht Frankfurt	87	(0)
1989–1992	FC Homburg	98	(0)
1992–1997	Werder Bremen	9	(0)
Total		194	(0)

International career
1985	Germany U-21	2	(0)
- * Club domestic league appearances and goals

Hans-Jürgen Gundelach (born 29 November 1963) is a German retired professional footballer who played as a goalkeeper.

== Honours ==
Eintracht Frankfurt

- DFB-Pokal: 1987–88

Werder Bremen

- Bundesliga: 1992–93; runner-up: 1994–95
- DFB-Pokal: 1993–94
