= Uli Borowka =

German footballer

Personal information
- Full name: Ulrich Ernst Borowka
- Date of birth: 19 May 1962 (age 64)
- Place of birth: Menden, West Germany
- Height: 1.77 m (5 ft 10 in)
- Position: Defender

Youth career
- 1967–1970: SG Hemer 08
- 1970–1975: FC Oese 49
- 1975–1979: SSV Kalthof
- 1979–1980: DSC Wanne-Eickel

Senior career*
Years	Team	Apps	(Gls)
1980–1981	Borussia M'gladbach II		
1981–1987	Borussia M'gladbach	149	(11)
1988–1995	Werder Bremen	239	(8)
1996	Tasmania Berlin	1	(0)
1997	Hannover 96	0	(0)
1997	Widzew Łódź	8	(0)
1997–1998	FC Oberneuland		
1999–2000	Viktoria Rheydt		
Total		397	(19)

International career
1982–1987	West Germany U21	2	(0)
1987–1988	West Germany Olympic	9	(0)
1988	West Germany	6	(0)

Managerial career
- 1997–1998: FC Oberneuland
- 2000–2001: Berlin AK 07
- 2001–2002: Türkiyemspor Berlin
- 2003–2004: Berlin AK 07
- * Club domestic league appearances and goals

Ulrich "Uli" Ernst Borowka (born 19 May 1962) is a German former professional footballer who played as a defender.

A blue-collar worker with a powerful shot, he spent the better part of his career at Werder Bremen (nearly one full decade), amassing Bundesliga totals of 388 games and 19 goals over the course of 15 seasons.

Borowka represented West Germany at Euro 1988.

== Club career ==
Born in Menden (Sauerland), Borowka made his Bundesliga debut at the age of 19 for Borussia Mönchengladbach, becoming a regular from his second season onwards – in 1984–85, as the team finished fourth, he scored a career-best five goals in 32 matches.

In 1987, Borowka signed for SV Werder Bremen, being a defensive mainstay for the club in six of his nine seasons and managing to net at least once in seven of them. In his debut campaign he helped to the league conquest, the first in 23 years, scoring in a 1–0 win at SV Waldhof Mannheim on 9 April 1988.

Borowka played in a total of 46 official matches in the 1991–92 season, including eight in Werder's victorious run in the UEFA Cup Winners' Cup. The following season he added another league, eventually leaving the club in December 1995 at nearly 34, for amateurs Tasmania 1900 Berlin. Subsequently he played for Hannover 96 (third level, only one month) and Widzew Łódź, becoming the first German to play in the Polish Ekstraklasa before finally retiring in the amateur leagues, at the age of 38.

After retiring, Borowka had various spells in coaching, with little impact.

== International career ==
Borowka earned six caps for West Germany in 1988, and featured for the nation at UEFA Euro 1988, playing all four matches for the semifinalists (two complete). His debut came on 2 April in a friendly with Argentina, a 1–0 win in Berlin in preparation for the continental competition.

== Honours ==
Borussia Mönchengladbach

- DFB-Pokal runners-up: 1983–84

Werder Bremen

- Bundesliga: 1987–88, 1992–93
- DFB-Pokal: 1990–91, 1993–94; runners-up 1988–89, 1989–90
- UEFA Cup Winners' Cup: 1991–92
- DFL-Supercup: 1988, 1993, 1994

Widzew Łódź

- Ekstraklasa: 1996–97
