= Thomas Wolter =

German former professional footballer (born 1963)

Personal information
- Date of birth: 4 October 1963 (age 63)
- Place of birth: Hamburg, West Germany
- Height: 1.80 m (5 ft 11 in)
- Positions: Midfielder; defender

Youth career
- 1971–1979: TuS Ottensen
- 1979–1984: HEBC Hamburg

Senior career*
Years	Team	Apps	(Gls)
1984–1998	Werder Bremen	312	(12)

International career
1992	Germany	1	(0)

Managerial career
- 2002–2013: Werder Bremen II
- * Club domestic league appearances and goals

Thomas Wolter (born 4 October 1963) is a German former professional footballer who played as a midfielder or a defender, and the current manager of SV Werder Bremen's youth academy.

== Club career ==
Born in Hamburg, Wolter arrived at SV Werder Bremen in the summer of 1984, from local amateurs Hamburg Eimsbütteler Ballspiel Club. After only three games in his first season in the Bundesliga he became first-choice, and remained his entire professional career with the same club.

Due to injury, Wolter was only able to appear in 16 matches in the 1987–88 campaign as the Hanseatic League team won the second national championship in its history, the first in 23 years. He also appeared in four German Cup finals in the late 80s/early 90s, winning two and losing two.

Wolter played in 34 official contests in 1991–92 – this included six in the season's UEFA Cup Winners' Cup which ended in conquest, with the player being stretchered off in the first half of the 2–0 final win against Monaco. He retired in June 1998 at almost 35 years of age, with nearly 400 official games – 312 in the (West) German top-flight - to his credit.

In the molds of another Werder legend, Thomas Schaaf, Wolter continued his career at the club as a manager, starting in the reserve team. In July 2013 he was appointed at the youth academy, while Viktor Skrypnyk replaced him at the reserves.

== International career ==
Wolter gained one cap for Germany, playing 60 minutes in a 3–1 friendly loss with Brazil in Porto Alegre, on 16 December 1992.

== Honours ==
Werder Bremen

- Bundesliga: 1987–88, 1992–93
- DFB-Pokal: 1990–91, 1993–94; runners-up 1988–89, 1989–90
- DFL-Supercup: 1988, 1993, 1994; runners-up 1991
- UEFA Cup Winners' Cup: 1991–92

== See also ==
- List of one-club men
