= Klaus Allofs =

German football player and executive (born 1956)

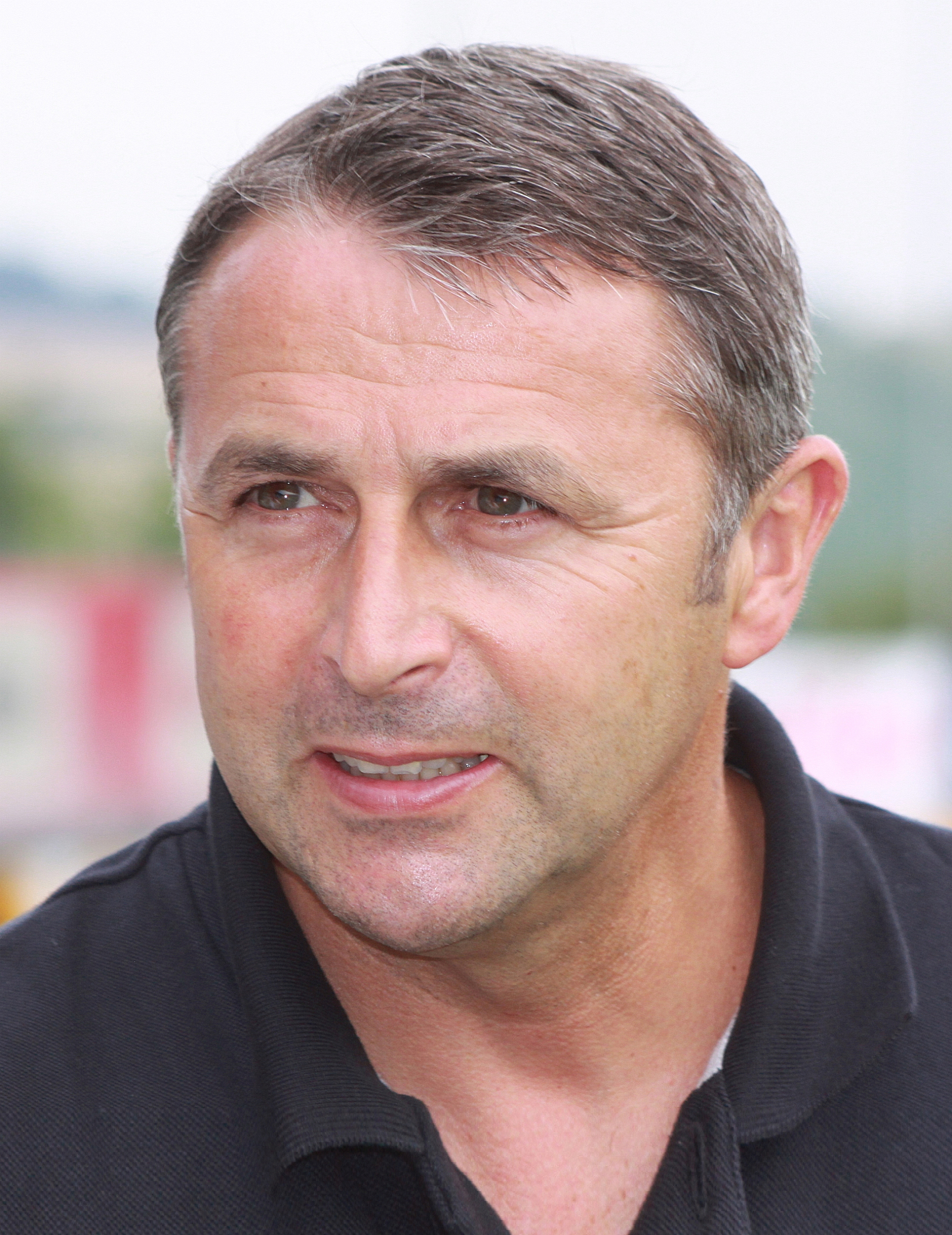
- Allofs in 2009

Personal information
- Date of birth: 5 December 1956 (age 69)
- Place of birth: Düsseldorf, West Germany
- Height: 1.74 m (5 ft 9 in)
- Position: Striker

Youth career
- 1964–1972: TuS Gerresheim
- 1972–1975: Fortuna Düsseldorf

Senior career*
Years	Team	Apps	(Gls)
1975–1981	Fortuna Düsseldorf	169	(71)
1981–1987	1. FC Köln	177	(88)
1987–1989	Marseille	53	(20)
1989–1990	Bordeaux	37	(14)
1990–1993	Werder Bremen	78	(18)
Total		514	(211)

International career
1978–1988	West Germany	56	(17)

Managerial career
- 1998–1999: Fortuna Düsseldorf
- 1999–2012: Werder Bremen (general manager)
- 2012–2016: VfL Wolfsburg (sporting director)
- 2020–: Fortuna Düsseldorf (general manager)
Medal record
Representing West Germany
UEFA European Championship
Winner	1980 Italy
- * Club domestic league appearances and goals

Klaus Allofs (born 5 December 1956) is a German former professional football player, manager, and executive.

A striker, Allofs was a prolific goalscorer for club and country. He amassed Bundesliga totals of 424 games and 177 goals over the course of 15 seasons (finishing as the league's top scorer on two occasions), playing mainly for Fortuna Düsseldorf and 1. FC Köln. His younger brother, Thomas, was also a professional footballer and also a striker, sometimes on the same team.

Allofs gained nearly 60 caps for West Germany, representing the nation in one World Cup and two European Championships, including the triumphant Euro 1980 tournament.

In 1999, after briefly working as a coach at Fortuna Düsseldorf, he became general manager at former club Werder Bremen, where he, in tandem with head coach Thomas Schaaf, helped the club to great success, winning the double of Bundesliga and DFB-Pokal in 2004, reaching the 2009 UEFA Cup final and qualifying for the UEFA Champions League six times.

== Club career ==
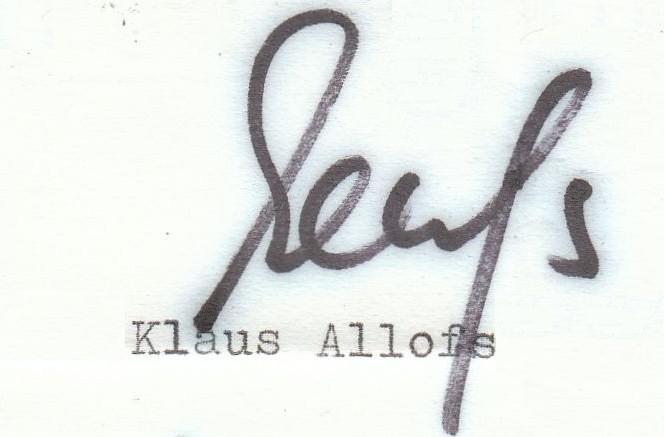
Klaus Allofs's signature

Born in Düsseldorf, Allofs began playing professionally for home team Fortuna Düsseldorf, in 1975. He started his career as an attacking midfielder, and scored nearly 100 overall goals for the club, helping it to consecutive German cup wins, and often playing upfront with sibling Thomas. In 1978–79, he finished as the Bundesliga's top scorer, and also scored three in nine in Fortuna's UEFA Cup Winners' Cup runner-up run, including one in the final, an extra time loss against FC Barcelona.

In 1981 Allofs joined 1. FC Köln, where he continued scoring at an excellent rate. In 1985–86 he only tallied seven times in the league, one goal being from 70 metres out against Bayer Leverkusen (an intended pass to a breakaway forward that bounced over the advancing Leverkusen goalkeeper), but he added nine in as many matches in the UEFA Cup, as the team lost the final on aggregate to Real Madrid. In the following season, he re-partnered with Thomas, then left the country during three years, playing in France with Olympique de Marseille and Girondins de Bordeaux.

Allofs retired in June 1993, aged nearly 37, after three seasons with Werder Bremen, still managing to score regularly. In the 1991–92 European Cup Winners' Cup he scored in the final against Monaco, in an eventual 2–0 win. In his final year, he played 16 games without scoring – the only time other than his first season that it happened in his career – as Werder won the league title. In total, he appeared in 424 Bundesliga matches, totalling 177 goals. When he retired he was in joint seventh place on the list of the Bundesliga's all-time leading scorers, tied with Dieter Müller.

== International career ==
Allofs played for Germany a total of 56 times, scoring 17 goals. His first match was on 11 October 1978 in Prague, against Czechoslovakia, a 4–3 friendly win.

Allofs went on to play for the national side at the victorious UEFA Euro 1980 (where he scored three times to top the goalscoring charts, all in a 3–2 group stage win against the Netherlands), Euro 1984 and 1986 FIFA World Cup. Pushed to the sidelines by emerging stars Rudi Völler and Jürgen Klinsmann, he retired from international play on 31 March 1988, scoring in a friendly with Sweden.

== Post-playing career ==
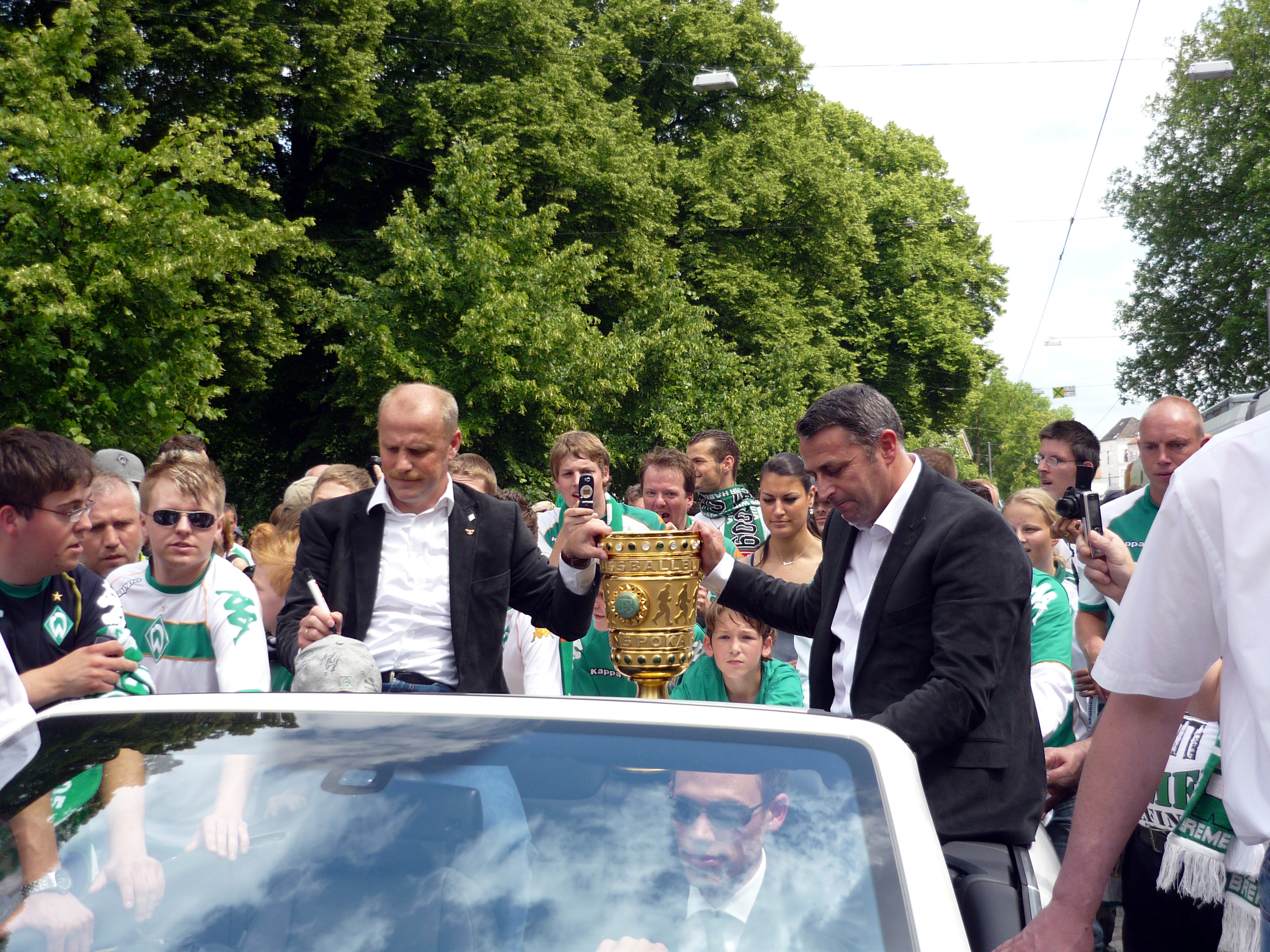
Allofs (right) as general manager of Werder Bremen, celebrating the win of the 2004 DFB-Pokal alongside Thomas Schaaf

Ahead of the 1998–99 season Allofs was appointed head coach at former club Fortuna Düsseldorf. In April, with the club placed last in the table, he was fired.

In July 1999, Allofs became general manager of Werder Bremen. In the 2003–04 season he and head coach Thomas Schaaf led Bremen to the double of Bundesliga and DFB-Pokal. This success was followed by six qualifications to the UEFA Champions League. In the 2008–09 season they also reached the 2009 UEFA Cup Final.

In November 2012, Allofs left Bremen to join VfL Wolfsburg as their new sporting director, remaining there until December 2016.

== Career statistics ==
Scores and results list Germany's goal tally first, score column indicates score after each Allofs goal.

List of international goals scored by Klaus Allofs
No.	Date	Venue	Opponent	Score	Result	Competition
1	12 September 1979	Olympiastadion, West Berlin, West Germany	Argentina	1–0	2–1	Friendly
2	27 February 1980	Weserstadion, Bremen, West Germany	Malta	1–0	8–0	UEFA Euro 1980 qualifying
3	27 February 1980	Weserstadion, Bremen, West Germany	Malta	4–0	8–0	UEFA Euro 1980 qualifying
4	13 May 1980	Waldstadion, Frankfurt, West Germany	Poland	2–1	3–1	Friendly
5	14 June 1980	Stadio San Paolo, Naples, Italy	Netherlands	1–0	3–2	UEFA Euro 1980
6	14 June 1980	Stadio San Paolo, Naples, Italy	Netherlands	2–0	3–2	UEFA Euro 1980
7	14 June 1980	Stadio San Paolo, Naples, Italy	Netherlands	3–0	3–2	UEFA Euro 1980
8	19 November 1980	Niedersachsenstadion, Hanover, West Germany	France	4–1	4–1	Friendly
9	7 January 1981	Parque Central, Montevideo, Uruguay	Brazil	1–0	1–4	Mundialito
10	16 December 1984	Ta' Qali National Stadium, Attard, Malta	Malta	2–1	3–2	1986 FIFA World Cup qualification
11	16 December 1984	Ta' Qali National Stadium, Attard, Malta	Malta	3–1	3–2	1986 FIFA World Cup qualification
12	30 April 1985	Generali Arena, Prague, Czechoslovakia	Czechoslovakia	5–0	5–1	1986 FIFA World Cup qualification
13	12 March 1986	Waldstadion, Frankfurt, West Germany	Brazil	2–0	2–0	Friendly
14	4 June 1986	Estadio La Corregidora, Querétaro, Mexico	Uruguay	1–1	1–1	1986 FIFA World Cup
15	8 June 1986	Estadio La Corregidora, Querétaro, Mexico	Scotland	2–1	2–1	1986 FIFA World Cup
16	24 September 1986	Parken Stadium, Copenhagen, Denmark	Denmark	2–0	2–0	Friendly
17	31 March 1988	Olympiastadion, West Berlin, West Germany	Sweden	1–0	1–1 (2–4 pens)	Friendly

== Honours ==
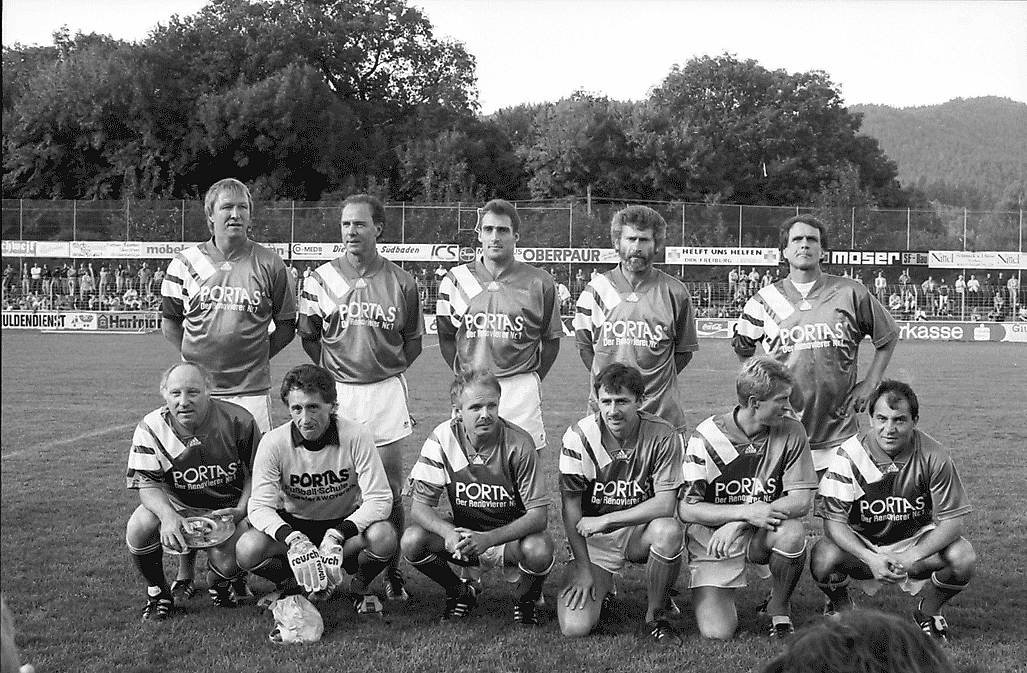
Allofs (front row, third from right) with Beckenbauer, Breitner, Hrubesch, Seeler and Magath at an All-Star game in Freiburg, 1993

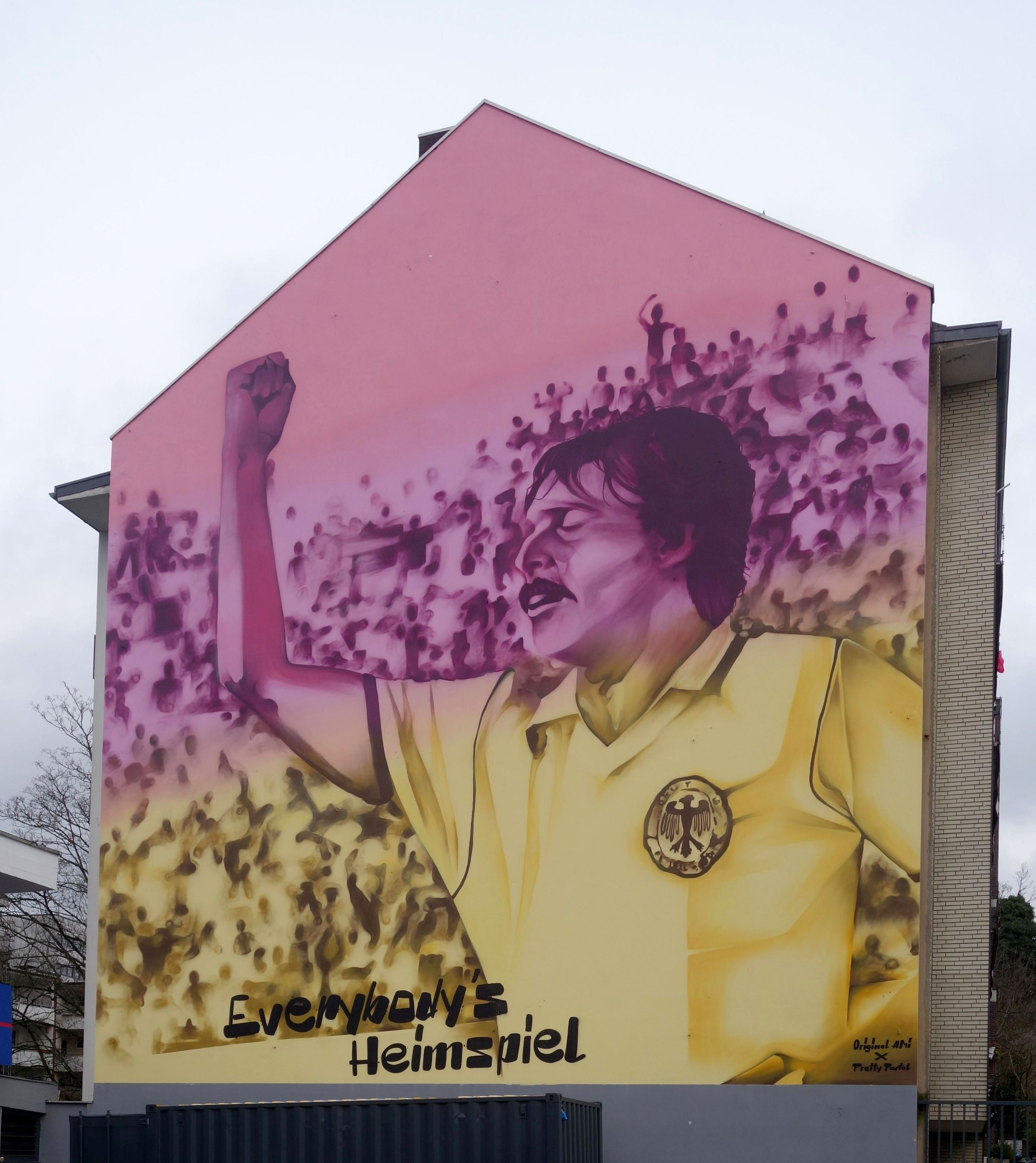
A mural honoring Düsseldorf legend Klaus Allofs

=== As player ===
Fortuna Düsseldorf

- DFB-Pokal: 1978–79, 1979–80
- UEFA Cup Winners' Cup runner-up: 1978–79

1. FC Köln

- DFB-Pokal: 1982–83
- UEFA Cup runner-up: 1985–86

Marseille

- Ligue 1: 1988–89
- Coupe de France: 1988–89

Bordeaux

- Ligue 1: runner-up 1989–90

Werder Bremen

- Bundesliga: 1992–93
- DFB-Pokal: 1990–91
- UEFA Cup Winners' Cup: 1991–92

West Germany

- UEFA European Championship: 1980
- FIFA World Cup runner-up: 1986

Individual

- Bundesliga top goalscorer: 1978–79, 1984–85
- kicker Bundesliga Team of the Season: 1978–79, 1984–85, 1990–91
- UEFA European Championship top goalscorer: 1980
- UEFA Cup top goalscorer: 1985–86

=== As general manager ===
Werder Bremen

- Bundesliga: 2003–04
- DFB-Pokal: 2003–04
- UEFA Cup runner-up: 2008–09

== See also ==
- List of European association football families
