= Dietmar Beiersdorfer =

German footballer (born 1963)

Personal information
- Date of birth: 16 November 1963 (age 62)
- Place of birth: Fürth, West Germany
- Height: 1.87 m (6 ft 2 in)
- Position: Defender

Team information
- Current team: Hamburger SV (Director)

Youth career
- 1970–1975: TSV Cadolzburg
- 1975–1977: TSV Altenberg
- 1977–: ASV Herzogenaurach

Senior career*
Years	Team	Apps	(Gls)
–1984	ASV Herzogenaurach		
1984–1985	1. FC Bamberg		
1985–1986	SpVgg Fürth	33	(3)
1986–1992	Hamburger SV	174	(14)
1992–1995	Werder Bremen	64	(6)
1996	1. FC Köln	16	(1)
1996–1997	Reggiana	20	(1)

International career
1991	Germany	1	(0)

Managerial career
- 2003–2009: Hamburger SV (sports director)
- 2010–2011: Red Bull Salzburg (sports director)
- 2012–2014: Zenit St. Petersburg (sports director)
- 2014–: Hamburger SV (director)
- * Club domestic league appearances and goals

Dietmar Beiersdorfer (born 16 November 1963) is a German former football player and coach who works as a director for Hamburger SV. He began a coaching career with Hamburger SV in 2003 and served as sporting director of the Austrian team Red Bull Salzburg between 2010 and April 2011.

== Club career ==
Born in Fürth, in his youth Beiersdorfer played for TSC Cadolzburg, TSV Altenberg and ASV Herzogenaurach. In 1984, he moved from 1. FC Bamberg to Oberliga team SpVgg Fürth, where he was discovered by scouts of Hamburger SV. Beiersdorfer was soon lured to Hamburg along with his friend Manfred Kastl. Immediately Beiersdorfer was able to gain a place in the first eleven, and he would subsequently help Hamburg to win several matches and the German cup.

By 1992 Beiersdorfer had played 174 games in the Bundesliga, scoring 14 goals. However, because the Hamburg team were struggling financially, he had to be sold to Werder Bremen, where he played 64 times between then and 1996. He had short spells at 1. FC Köln and Reggiana.

== International career ==
Beiersdorfer played one game for the Germany national team, in May 1991. It was a Euro 1992 qualifier against Belgium.

== Coaching career ==
After retiring Beiersdorfer took a course in business management, and proceeded to become the general manager of Hamburger SV, before being released on 24 June 2009. On 1 January 2010. he became sport director of FC Red Bull Salzburg, replacing Heinz Hochhauser. On 8 April 2011, he parted company with Salzburg by mutual consent after poor record in the season.

== Honours ==
Hamburger SV

- DFB-Pokal: 1986–87

Werder Bremen

- Bundesliga: 1992–93
- DFB-Pokal: 1993–94
- DFL-Supercup: 1993, 1994
