= Frank Neubarth =

German footballer (born 1962)

Personal information
- Date of birth: 29 July 1962 (age 64)
- Place of birth: Hamburg, West Germany
- Height: 1.93 m (6 ft 4 in)
- Position: Forward

Youth career
- –1980: SC Concordia von 1907

Senior career*
Years	Team	Apps	(Gls)
1980–1982	SC Concordia von 1907	65	(23)
1982–1996	Werder Bremen	317	(97)
Total		382	(120)

International career
1983	West Germany U-21	4	(0)
1988	West Germany	1	(0)

Managerial career
- 1999–2002: Werder Bremen II
- 2002–2003: Schalke 04
- 2004–2006: Holstein Kiel
- 2007: Carl Zeiss Jena
- * Club domestic league appearances and goals

Frank Neubarth (born 29 July 1962) is a German football manager and former player who spent his whole career with SV Werder Bremen and has since managed FC Schalke 04, Holstein Kiel and FC Carl Zeiss Jena.

== Playing career ==
Neubarth was born in Hamburg. A forward, he played for Werder Bremen from 1982 until 1996 and scored 97 goals in 317 Bundesliga matches. He also scored 25 goals in the DFB-Pokal and 13 goals in European competitions. He scored at least once every season, except the 1986–87 campaign when he was injured mostly and played just five matches. The most goals he ever scored in a single season was 20 during the 1985–86 season in which Bremen finished in third place. Throughout the course of his career, he won the DFB-Pokal in 1991 and in 1994, and the UEFA Cup Winners' Cup in 1992. In 1988 and 1993, he helped Bremen win the league title. He earned his only cap for the West German national team on 2 April 1988.

== Coaching career ==
After his retirement from playing, Neubarth went into coaching and worked with Werder Bremen's reserve team from 1 July 1999 until 7 January 2002. On 1 July 2002, he succeeded Huub Stevens as head coach of Schalke 04 where he was in charge for less than 10 months. Then, in July 2004, he was appointed as head coach of Holstein Kiel. He remained at Holstein until 2 October 2006. On 11 April 2007, he was unveiled as Heiko Weber's successor at Carl Zeiss Jena. He took over with just six games of the 2006–07 season remaining and helped the club maintain an unbeaten record until the end of the campaign and avoid relegation to the Second Division. However, after a poor start to the 2007–08 season, he was sacked after just five games, on 20 September 2007.

== Coaching record ==
As of 15 October 2014

Team	From	To	Record					
Team	From	To	M	W	D	L	Win %	Ref.
Werder Bremen II	1 July 1999	7 January 2002	96	39	25	32	40.63	
Schalke 04	1 July 2002	26 March 2003	37	15	15	7	40.54	
Holstein Kiel	1 July 2004	2 October 2006	83	36	18	29	43.37	
Carl Zeiss Jena	11 April 2007	20 September 2007	12	4	4	4	33.33	
Total			228	94	62	72	41.23	—

== Honours ==
Werder Bremen

- UEFA Cup Winners' Cup: 1991–92
- Bundesliga: 1987–88, 1992–93
- DFB-Pokal: 1990–91, 1993–94
