= 1992–93 Bundesliga =

30th season of the Bundesliga

Bundesliga
- Season: 1992–93
- Dates: 14 August 1992 – 5 June 1993
- Champions: Werder Bremen; 3rd Bundesliga title 3rd German title
- Relegated: Bochum; Uerdingen; Saarbrücken
- Champions League: Werder Bremen
- Cup Winners' Cup: Bayer Leverkusen
- UEFA Cup: Bayern Munich; Frankfurt; Borussia Dortmund; Karlsruhe
- Matches: 306
- Goals: 881 (2.88 per match)
- Top goalscorer: Ulf Kirsten, Tony Yeboah (20)
- Biggest home win: Dortmund 6–0 Wattenscheid (16 April 1993); Bayern 6–0 Saarbrücken (23 April 1993)
- Biggest away win: Uerdingen 0–5 K'lautern (21 November 1992)
- Highest scoring: Bayern 5–3 Stuttgart (8 goals) (30 April 1993)

The 1992–93 Bundesliga was the 30th season of the Bundesliga, Germany's premier football league. It began on 14 August 1992 and ended on 5 June 1993. VfB Stuttgart were the defending champions.

== Competition format ==
Every team played two games against each other team, one at home and one away. Teams received two points for a win and one point for a draw. If two or more teams were tied on points, places were determined by goal difference and, if still tied, by goals scored. The team with the most points were crowned champions while the three teams with the fewest points were relegated to 2. Bundesliga.

== Team changes to 1991–92 ==
Stuttgarter Kickers, Hansa Rostock, MSV Duisburg and Fortuna Düsseldorf were relegated to the 2. Bundesliga after finishing in the last four places. Due to a size reduction back to 18 teams, only two teams were promoted. These were Bayer 05 Uerdingen, winners of the 2. Bundesliga Northern Division and 1. FC Saarbrücken, champions of the Southern Division.

== Team overview ==
Location of teams in Bundesliga 1992–93

Club	Location	Ground	Capacity
VfL Bochum	Bochum	Ruhrstadion	40,000
SV Werder Bremen	Bremen	Weserstadion	32,000
Borussia Dortmund	Dortmund	Westfalenstadion	52,616
Dynamo Dresden	Dresden	Rudolf-Harbig-Stadion	30,000
Eintracht Frankfurt	Frankfurt	Waldstadion	62,000
Hamburger SV	Hamburg	Volksparkstadion	62,000
1. FC Kaiserslautern	Kaiserslautern	Fritz-Walter-Stadion	38,500
Karlsruher SC	Karlsruhe	Wildparkstadion	50,000
1. FC Köln	Cologne	Müngersdorfer Stadion	55,000
Bayer 04 Leverkusen	Leverkusen	Ulrich-Haberland-Stadion	27,800
Borussia Mönchengladbach	Mönchengladbach	Bökelbergstadion	34,500
FC Bayern Munich	Munich	Olympiastadion	70,000
1. FC Nürnberg	Nuremberg	Frankenstadion	55,000
1. FC Saarbrücken	Saarbrücken	Ludwigspark	36,000
FC Schalke 04	Gelsenkirchen	Parkstadion	70,000
VfB Stuttgart	Stuttgart	Neckarstadion	68,000
Bayer 05 Uerdingen	Krefeld	Grotenburg-Stadion	34,500
SG Wattenscheid 09	Wattenscheid	Lohrheidestadion	15,000

== League table ==
Pos	Team	Pld	W	D	L	GF	GA	GD	Pts	Qualification or relegation
1	Werder Bremen (C)	34	19	10	5	63	30	+33	48	Qualification to Champions League first round
2	Bayern Munich	34	18	11	5	74	45	+29	47	Qualification to UEFA Cup first round
3	Eintracht Frankfurt	34	15	12	7	56	39	+17	42	Qualification to UEFA Cup first round
4	Borussia Dortmund	34	18	5	11	61	43	+18	41	Qualification to UEFA Cup first round
5	Bayer Leverkusen	34	14	12	8	64	45	+19	40	Qualification to Cup Winners' Cup first round
6	Karlsruher SC	34	14	11	9	60	54	+6	39	Qualification to UEFA Cup first round (Note: As Bayer Leverkusen qualified for the Cup Winners' Cup, their UEFA Cup place was transferred to Karlsruhe.)
7	VfB Stuttgart	34	12	12	10	56	50	+6	36	
8	1. FC Kaiserslautern	34	13	9	12	50	40	+10	35	
9	Borussia Mönchengladbach	34	13	9	12	59	59	0	35	
10	Schalke 04	34	11	12	11	42	43	−1	34	
11	Hamburger SV	34	8	15	11	42	44	−2	31	
12	1. FC Köln	34	12	4	18	41	51	−10	28	
13	1. FC Nürnberg	34	10	8	16	30	47	−17	28	
14	SG Wattenscheid 09	34	10	8	16	46	67	−21	28	
15	Dynamo Dresden	34	7	13	14	32	49	−17	27	
16	VfL Bochum (R)	34	8	10	16	45	52	−7	26	Relegation to 2. Bundesliga
17	Bayer 05 Uerdingen (R)	34	7	10	17	35	64	−29	24	Relegation to 2. Bundesliga
18	1. FC Saarbrücken (R)	34	5	13	16	37	71	−34	23	Relegation to 2. Bundesliga

Source: www.dfb.de
Rules for classification: 1) points; 2) goal difference; 3) number of goals scored.
(C) Champions; (R) Relegated

== Results ==
Home \ Away	BOC	SVW	BVB	SGD	SGE	HSV	FCK	KSC	KOE	B04	BMG	FCB	FCN	FCS	S04	VFB	B05	SGW
VfL Bochum	—	2–0	2–2	2–2	1–0	1–2	1–3	2–2	0–0	2–2	2–1	2–2	4–0	4–0	0–1	0–0	4–1	3–1
Werder Bremen	3–1	—	1–0	3–0	0–0	5–0	1–0	3–0	2–0	1–1	2–0	4–1	3–0	2–0	2–0	1–1	2–1	3–0
Borussia Dortmund	1–0	2–2	—	3–0	3–0	3–1	1–0	3–1	4–1	1–2	4–1	1–2	4–2	3–0	0–2	0–4	2–0	6–0
Dynamo Dresden	0–0	2–3	3–0	—	0–2	1–1	1–3	3–0	3–0	2–0	1–0	0–0	1–2	0–0	1–0	0–0	1–1	2–1
Eintracht Frankfurt	4–1	3–0	4–1	1–1	—	3–3	3–0	4–1	2–1	2–2	1–3	1–1	0–0	1–1	0–3	4–0	1–0	4–1
Hamburger SV	2–0	0–0	1–2	1–1	1–2	—	2–2	1–2	3–0	0–0	0–2	3–1	0–1	2–0	1–2	1–1	3–0	1–1
1. FC Kaiserslautern	3–1	3–1	0–0	2–0	0–2	2–2	—	2–3	1–0	4–0	0–0	1–3	2–0	1–1	3–0	0–0	2–1	4–1
Karlsruher SC	1–0	5–2	3–0	3–1	4–1	1–0	1–1	—	3–1	1–1	4–2	4–2	1–1	2–2	0–0	1–1	4–0	2–1
1. FC Köln	1–0	0–0	0–1	3–1	0–1	2–2	0–3	2–0	—	1–0	1–2	1–3	2–0	4–2	2–1	3–1	5–0	3–0
Bayer Leverkusen	3–1	2–2	3–3	0–0	1–1	1–1	2–0	5–1	3–0	—	4–0	2–4	2–1	1–1	6–1	4–0	1–0	3–1
Borussia Mönchengladbach	1–1	3–1	0–3	5–1	3–3	0–0	2–2	3–1	1–2	2–2	—	2–2	2–1	2–5	2–0	1–1	0–4	4–1
Bayern Munich	3–1	1–3	2–0	3–1	1–0	4–0	1–0	3–3	3–0	4–1	2–2	—	1–0	6–0	1–1	5–3	2–0	1–1
1. FC Nürnberg	2–1	0–0	1–2	0–0	1–2	1–0	0–0	0–0	2–1	0–1	0–1	0–0	—	4–1	1–4	3–2	2–0	2–1
1. FC Saarbrücken	1–1	0–4	3–1	1–1	0–0	0–3	2–0	2–0	0–3	3–1	0–4	1–1	0–1	—	1–3	1–4	3–3	0–1
Schalke 04	0–3	0–0	0–0	2–0	0–0	0–0	4–0	2–2	1–0	2–1	1–2	3–3	0–0	2–2	—	1–0	1–1	3–4
VfB Stuttgart	4–1	0–3	1–0	4–0	2–2	1–1	3–1	2–1	2–0	0–3	3–2	2–3	3–0	2–2	1–0	—	1–2	4–1
Bayer Uerdingen	2–1	0–2	0–2	1–1	2–0 (Note: The Bayer Uerdingen v Eintracht Frankfurt match from 22 May 1993, which finished with a score of 2–5, was later awarded to Bayer Uerdingen with a score of 2–0 due to Eintracht Frankfurt having more than the three allowed foreign players on the pitch.)	0–2	0–5	1–1	0–0	2–1	1–3	0–3	2–1	1–1	4–2	3–3	—	1–1
SG Wattenscheid	2–0	2–2	1–3	2–1	1–2	2–2	1–0	0–2	4–2	1–3	3–1	2–0	4–1	3–1	0–0	0–0	1–1	—

Source: DFB
Legend: Blue = home team win; Yellow = draw; Red = away team win.

== Top goalscorers ==
20 goals

- (Germany) Ulf Kirsten (Bayer 04 Leverkusen)
- (Ghana) Tony Yeboah (Eintracht Frankfurt)

17 goals

- (New Zealand) Wynton Rufer (SV Werder Bremen)

15 goals

- (Switzerland) Stéphane Chapuisat (Borussia Dortmund)

13 goals

- (Germany) Andreas Thom (Bayer 04 Leverkusen)
- (Germany) Fritz Walter (VfB Stuttgart)
- (Germany) Uwe Wegmann (VfL Bochum)

11 goals

- (Russia) Sergei Kiriakov (Karlsruher SC)
- (Germany) Bruno Labbadia (FC Bayern Munich)

== Attendances ==
No.	Team	Attendance	Change	Highest
1	Bayern München	46,059	41.6%	64,000
2	Schalke 04	41,724	-12.1%	70,200
3	Borussia Dortmund	40,957	-7.7%	43,000
4	1. FC Kaiserslautern	33,403	-0.8%	38,000
5	1. FC Nürnberg	33,221	-12.7%	50,114
6	1. FC Köln	29,824	29.1%	55,000
7	VfB Stuttgart	27,841	-17.6%	55,000
8	Eintracht Frankfurt	25,382	-15.0%	59,000
9	Hamburger SV	23,774	5.2%	60,500
10	Borussia Mönchengladbach	23,661	9.1%	34,500
11	VfL Bochum	23,377	24.8%	41,021
12	1. FC Saarbrücken	23,267	120.9%	36,000
13	Karlsruher SC	22,118	23.4%	40,000
14	Werder Bremen	21,860	25.7%	40,800
15	Bayer Leverkusen	17,009	11.8%	26,900
16	Dynamo Dresden	15,656	-5.9%	29,000
17	Bayer 05 Uerdingen	11,571	76.0%	26,000
18	Wattenscheid 09	11,106	-22.5%	28,000

== See also ==
- 1992–93 2. Bundesliga
- 1992–93 DFB-Pokal
