= List of Bayer 04 Leverkusen players =

This is a list of notable footballers who have played for Bayer Leverkusen. Generally, this means players that have played a significant number of first-class matches for the club. Other players who have played an important role for the club can be included, but the reason why they have been included should be added in the 'Notes' column.

For a list of all Bayer Leverkusen players, major or minor, with a Wikipedia article, see Category:Bayer Leverkusen players, and for the current squad see the main Bayer Leverkusen article.

Players are listed according to the date of their first team debut. Appearances and goals are for first-team competitive league matches only; wartime matches are excluded. Substitute appearances included.

== Table ==
Player	Nationality	Position	Bayer Leverkusen career	Appearances	Goals	Notes
Karl-Heinz Spikofski	(Germany)	Midfielder	1950-1952	27	3	
Udo Lattek	(Germany)	Forward	1955-1957	6	2	
Heinz Höher	(Germany)	Midfielder/Forward	1957-1963	155	60	
Zvonko Bego	(Socialist Federal Republic of Yugoslavia)	Midfielder	1960-1969	17	1	
Uwe Klimaschefski	(Germany)	Forward	1960-1963	25	10	
Manfred Manglitz	(Germany)	Goalkeeper	1961-1963	26	0	
Werner Görts	(Germany)	Forward	1962-1965	41	8	
Werner Biskup	(Germany)	Defender	1962-1965	30	3	
Franz-Josef Wolfframm	(Germany)	Midfielder	1964-1966	0	0	
Dieter Fern	(Germany)	Forward	1965-1967	4	0	
Leo Wilden	(Germany)	Defender	1966-1969	0	0	
Zvonko Bego	(Croatia)	Midfielder	1968-1969	17	1	
Dieter Ferner	(Germany)	Goalkeeper	1968-1973	4	0	
Harald Klose	(Germany)	Forward	1968-1969	0	0	
Pavle Kiš	(Serbia)	Forward	1969-1970	0	0	
Burkhard Segler	(Germany)	Midfielder	1970-1972	0	0	
Herbert Mühlenberg	(Germany)	Forward	1972-1974	0	0	
Gerhard Kentschke	(Germany)	Forward/Midfielder	1973-1977	48	5	
Walter Posner	(Germany)	Defender	1975-1984	274	5	
Theodor Rielander	(Germany)	Midfielder	1975-1978	44	2	
Dieter Herzog	(Germany)	Midfielder	1976-1983	193	29	
Jürgen Gelsdorf	(Germany)	Defender	1976-1986	296	26	
Peter Hermann	(Germany)	Forward	1976-1984	215	32	
Thomas Hörster	(Germany)	Defender	1977-1991	404	26	
Kurt Eigl	(Germany)	Midfielder	1979-1982	39	2	
Dietmar Demuth	(Germany)	Defender	1979-1983	92	14	
Jürgen Glowacz	(Germany)	Defender	1979-1982	53	13	
Arne Larsen Økland	(Norway)	Forward	1980-1983	101	43	
Mathias Hönerbach	(Germany)	Defender	1980-1981	0	0	
Valentin Herr	(Germany)	Goalkeeper	1980-1982	2	0	
Christian Sackewitz	(Germany)	Forward	1981-1982	20	2	
Jürgen Röber	(Germany)	Forward	1982–1986	105	18	
Helmut Winklhofer	(Germany)	Defender	1982-1985	90	5	
Rüdiger Vollborn	(Germany)	Goalkeeper	1982-1999	401	0	
Herbert Waas	(Germany)	Forward	1982-1989	209	72	
Rudolf Wojtowicz	(Poland)	Defender	1982-1986	76	2	
Frank Saborowski	(Germany)	Defender	1982-1984	41	0	
Cha Bum-kun	(South Korea)	Forward	1983-1989	185	52	
Ulrich Bittorf	(Germany)	Midfielder	1983-1984	37	3	
Dieter Bast	(Germany)	Defender/Midfelder/Forward	1983-1986	71	2	
Thomas Zechel	(Germany)	Midfilder/Defender	1983-1988	70	6	
Wolfgang Patzke	(Germany)	Midfielder/Forward	1983-1986	59	5	
Roman Geszlecht	(Poland)	Defender	1983-1985	49	1	
Christian Schreier	(Germany)	Midfielder	1984-1991	203	63	
Falko Götz	(Germany)	Forward	1984–1988	115	26	
Florian Hinterberger	(Germany)	Midfelder	1984-1990	105	2	
Anders Giske	(Norway)	Defender	1984-1985	29	1	
Alois Reinhardt	(Germany)	Defender	1984–1991	156	1	
Stefan Kohn	(Germany)	Forward	1984-1985 1986–1987	18	2	
Minas Hantzidis	(Greece)	Midfielder	1985-1988	24	1	
Günter Drews	(Germany)	Midfielder	1985-1987	46	1	
Peter Zanter	(Germany)	Defender	1985-1988	40	0	
Knut Reinhardt	(Germany)	Midfielder	1986–1991	118	5	
Wolfgang Rolff	(Germany)	Midfielder	1986–1989	99	9	
Jean-Pierre de Keyser	(Germany)	Defender	1986-1990	81	1	
Dirk Rehbein	(Germany)	Midfielder	1986-1988	2	0	
Bernd Dreher	(Germany)	Goalkeeper	1986-1990	9	0	
Jürgen Luginger	(Germany)	Defender	1986-1987	1	0	
Christian Hausmann	(Germany)	Midfielder/Forward	1986-1988	56	2	
Erich Seckler	(Germany)	Defender	1987–1992	86	2	
Tita	(Brazil)	Forward	1987–1988	21	10	
Ralf Falkenmayer	(Germany)	Midfielder	1987-1989	48	7	
Klaus Täuber	(Germany)	Forward	1987-1989	31	8	
Andrzej Buncol	(Poland)	Midfielder	1987-1992	123	14	
Marcus Feinbier	(Germany)	Forward	1987-1992	69	3	
Marek Leśniak	(Poland)	Forward	1988–1992	119	20	
Terje Olsen	(Norway)	Midfielder	1988-1990	1	0	
Oliver Pagé	(Germany)	Defender	1988-1991	6	1	
Claus-Dieter Wollitz	(Germany)	Midfielder	1988-1989	7	0	
Manfred Kastl	(Germany)	Forward	1988-1989	26	6	
Andreas Fischer	(Germany)	Defender	1989–1994	151	13	
Jorginho	(Brazil)	Defender	1989–1992	87	9	
Martin Kree	(Germany)	Defender	1989–1994	156	22	
Markus von Ahlen	(Germany)	Midfielder Defender	1989-1993	24	1	
Heiko Herrlich	(Germany)	Forward	1989-1993	75	6	
Holger Aden	(Germany)	Forward	1989	2	0	
Dirk Heinen	(Germany)	Goalkeeper	1990–1999	107	0	
Franco Foda	(Germany)	Defender	1990–1994	113	10	
Ulf Kirsten	(Germany)	Forward	1990–2003	350	182	
Andreas Thom	(Germany)	Forward	1990–1995	161	36	
Ioan Lupescu	(Romania)	Midfielder	1990–1996	184	4	
René Rydlewicz	(Germany)	Midfielder	1990-1994 1996–1997	28	2	
Christian Wörns	(Germany)	Defender	1991–1998	211	13	
Markus Happe	(Germany)	Defender	1991–1999	188	8	
Stephan Hanke	(Germany)	Midfielder	1991-1994	1	0	
Heiko Scholz	(Germany)	Defender	1992–1995	75	5	
Pavel Hapal	(Czech Republic)	Midfielder	1992–1995	86	13	
Josef Nehl	(Germany)	Midfielder	1992–1996	56	5	
Uwe Stöver	(Germany)	Defender	1992-1993	9	1	
Mario Tolkmitt	(Germany)	Midfielder	1992-1996	55	0	
Paulo Sérgio	(Brazil)	Forward	1993–1997	121	47	
Bernard Schuiteman	(Netherlands)	Defender	1993-1995	6	0	
Bernd Schuster	(Germany)	Midfielder	1993–1996	59	8	
Taifour Diané	(Guinea)	Forward	1993-1995	1	0	
Ralf Becker	(Germany)	Midfielder	1993-1995	23	1	
Guido Hoffmann	(Germany)	Midfielder	1993	18	2	
Hans-Peter Lehnhoff	(Germany)	Midfielder	1994–2000	139	11	
Rudi Völler	(Germany)	Forward	1994–1996	62	26	
Mike Rietpietsch	(Germany)	Midfielder	1994-1997	22	0	
Walter Junghans	(Germany)	Goalkeeper	1994	0	0	
Claudio Reyna	(United States)	Midfielder	1994-1999	26	0	
Markus Anfang	(Germany)	Midfielder	1994-1995	0	0	
Thomas Dooley	(United States)	Defender	1994-1995	21	3	
Markus Kurth	(Germany)	Forward	1994-1995	2	0	
Markus Münch	(Germany)	Defender/Midfielder	1994-1996	57	3	
Markus Feldhoff	(Germany)	Forward	1995–1998	77	14	
Ramon Menezes	(Brazil)	Midfielder	1995-1996	15	1	
Sebastian Barnes	(Ghana)	Midfielder	1995-1996	0	0	
Rodrigo Chagas	(Brazil)	Midfielder/Defender	1995-1996	27	1	
Sebastian Helbig	(Germany)	Forward	1995-1998	2	0	
Daniel Addo	(Ghana)	Midfielder	1995-1998	0	0	
Thomas Vana	(Germany)	Midfielder	1995	0	0	
Pete Marino	(United States)	Forward	1995-1996	0	0	
Niko Kovač	(Croatia)	Midfielder	1996–1999	77	8	
Robert Kovač	(Croatia)	Defender	1996–2001	127	1	
Manuel Cardoni	(Luxembourg)	Midfielder	1996-1998	1	0	
Zé Elias	(Brazil)	Midfielder	1996-1997	23	0	
Jan Heintze	(Denmark)	Defender	1996-1999	87	5	
Lars Leese	(Germany)	Goalkeeper	1996-1997	0	0	
Daniel Schumann	(Germany)	Defender	1996-1997	0	0	
Erik Meijer	(Netherlands)	Forward	1996–1999	84	16	
Stefan Beinlich	(Germany)	Midfielder	1997–2000	80	24	
Emerson	(Brazil)	Midfielder	1997–2000	88	11	
Paulo Rink	(Brazil)	Forward	1997–2001	88	29	
Artyom Bezrodny	(Russia)	Midfielder	1997-1998	0	0	
Boris Živković	(Croatia)	Defender	1997-2003	144	9	
Thorsten Nehrbauer	(Germany)	Midfielder	1997-1998	0	0	
Dirk Lottner	(Germany)	Midfielder	1997-1998	17	2	
Jörg Schmadtke	(Germany)	Goalkeeper	1997-1998	0	0	
Zé Roberto	(Brazil)	Midfielder	1998–2002	113	17	
Adam Matysek	(Poland)	Goalkeeper	1998–2001	78	0	
Bent Skammelsrud	(Norway)	Midfielder	1998	8	0	
Mehdi Pashazadeh	(Iran)	Defender	1998-1999	0	0	
Zoran Mamić	(Croatia)	Midfielder/Defender	1998-2000	15	0	
Jörg Reeb	(Germany)	Midfielder/Defender	1998-2001	54	1	
Dariush Yazdani	(Iran)	Midfielder	1998-1999	0	0	
Adam Ledwoń	(Poland)	Midfielder	1998-1999	10	0	
Aaron Mokoena	(South Africa)	Midfielder/Defender	1998-1999	0	0	
Thomas Brdarić	(Germany)	Forward	1999–2003	82	14	
Oliver Neuville	(Germany)	Forward	1999–2004	165	42	
Bernd Schneider	(Germany)	Midfielder	1999-2009	235	35	
Frankie Hejduk	(United States)	Defender/Midfielder	1999-2003	19	1	
Vratislav Greško	(Slovakia)	Defender	1999-2000	15	0	
Michael Ballack	(Germany)	Midfielder	1999-2002 2010–2012	35	2	
Frank Juric	(Australia)	Goalkeeper	1999-2004	11	0	
Torben Hoffmann	(Germany)	Defender	1999-2000	19	0	
John Thorrington	(United States)	Midfielder	1999-2001	0	0	
Robson Ponte	(Brazil)	Midfielder	1999-2005	79	6	
Mirosław Spiżak	(Poland)	Forward	1999-2000	0	0	
Pascal Zuberbühler	(Switzerland)	Goalkeeper	2000-2001	14	0	
Marko Babić	(Croatia)	Midfielder	2000–2007	144	13	
Jurica Vranješ	(Croatia)	Midfielder	2000–2003	46	0	
Pascal Ojigwe	(Nigeria)	Defender/Midfider	2000-2003	30	0	
Landon Donovan	(United States)	Midfielder/Forward	2000-2005	7	0	
Cha Du-ri	(South Korea)	Defender/Midfielder	2000-2002	0	0	
Ali Mousavi	(Iran)	Forward	2000	0	0	
Marquinhos	(Brazil)	Midfielder	2000-2005	31	6	
Tom Starke	(Germany)	Goalkeeper	2000-2006	0	0	
Markus Daun	(Germany)	Forward	2000-2001	3	0	
Anel Džaka	(Germany)	Midfielder	2000-2003	3	0	
Hans-Jörg Butt	(Germany)	Goalkeeper	2001-2007	191	7	
Yıldıray Baştürk	(Turkey)	Midfielder	2001–2004	73	8	
Lúcio	(Brazil)	Defender	2001-2004	92	15	
Diego Placente	(Argentina)	Defender	2001-2005	123	3	
Dimitar Berbatov	(Bulgaria)	Forward	2001-2006	154	69	
Joey DiGiamarino	(United States)	Defender	2001-2002	0	0	
Thorsten Burkhardt	(Germany)	Midfielder	2001-2002	0	0	
Zoltán Sebescen	(Germany)	Defender/Midfielder	2001-2004	32	3	
Hüzeyfe Doğan	(Germany)	Midfielder	2001-2003	0	0	
Ioannis Masmanidis	(Greece) / (Germany)	Midfielder	2001-2004	14	0	
Thomas Kleine	(Germany)	Defender	2001-2003	10	0	
Thorsten Wittek	(Germany)	Midfielder	2001-2002	1	0	
Daniel Bierofka	(Germany)	Midfielder	2002–2005	78	12	
França	(Brazil)	Forward	2002–2005	102	29	
Juan	(Brazil)	Defender	2002–2007	139	10	
Christoph Preuß	(Germany)	Defender/Midfielder	2002-2003	4	0	
Jan Šimák	(Czech Republic)	Midfielder	2002-2003	22	3	
Daniel Bierofka	(Germany)	Midfielder	2002-2005	78	11	
Emanuel Pogatetz	(Austria)	Defender	2002-2005	0	0	
Nasir El Kasmi	(Morocco)	Midfielder	2002-2003	0	0	
Jan-Ingwer Callsen-Bracker	(Germany)	Defender	2002-2008	36	2	
Radosław Kałużny	(Poland)	Defender	2003–2004	12	0	
Sebastian Schoof	(Germany)	Forward	2003	7	2	
Teddy Lučić	(Sweden)	Defender	2003-2005	11	0	
Džemal Berberović	(Bosnia and Herzegovina)	Defender	2003-2005	0	0	
Cris	(Brazil)	Defender	2003	2	0	
Clemens Fritz	(Germany)	Defender/Midfielder	2003-2006	43	2	
Paul Freier	(Germany)	Midfielder	2004–2008	111	17	
Jacek Krzynówek	(Poland)	Midfielder	2004–2006	52	9	
Andriy Voronin	(Ukraine)	Forward	2004–2007	92	32	
Jermaine Jones	(United States)	Midfielder	2004-2005	5	0	
Paul Freier	(Germany)	Midfielder	2004-2008	112	17	
Roque Júnior	(Brazil)	Defender	2004-2007	35	0	
Tranquillo Barnetta	(Switzerland)	Midfielder	2004-2012	187	23	
Sezer Öztürk	(Turkey)	Midfielder	2004-2006	7	0	
Gonzalo Castro	(Germany)	Midfielder	2005–2015	286	25	
Ahmed Reda Madouni	(Algeria)	Defender	2005-2007	29	3	
Simon Rolfes	(Germany)	Midfielder	2005-2015	288	41	
Danko Lazović	(Serbia)	Forward	2005	9	0	
Josip Tadić	(Croatia)	Forward	2005-2006	1	0	
Athirson	(Brazil)	Midfielder/Defender	2005-2007	30	2	
Stefan Kießling	(Germany)	Forward	2006–2018	344	131	
Pirmin Schwegler	(Switzerland)	Midfielder	2006–2009	46	0	
Assimiou Touré	(Togo)	Defender	2006-2010	2	0	
Sergej Barbarez	(Bosnia and Herzegovina)	Forward	2006-2008	61	11	
Karim Haggui	(Tunisia)	Defender	2006-2009	59	3	
Michal Papadopulos	(Czech Republic)	Forward	2006-2008	19	0	
Fredrik Stenman	(Sweden)	Defender	2006-2007	28	0	
Benedikt Fernandez	(Germany)	Goalkeeper	2006-2011	6	0	
Manuel Friedrich	(Germany)	Defender	2007–2013	147	11	
Theofanis Gekas	(Greece)	Forward	2007–2010	50	13	
Arturo Vidal	(Chile)	Midfielder	2007–2011	117	15	
Michal Kadlec	(Czech Republic)	Defender	2007–2013	128	8	
Dmitri Bulykin	(Russia)	Forward	2007-2008	15	2	
Hans Sarpei	(Ghana)	Defender	2007-2010	42	0	
Ricardo Faty	(Senegal)	Midfielder	2007	2	0	
Marcel Risse	(Germany)	Midfielder	2007-2011	3	0	
Atanas Kurdov	(Bulgaria)	Forward	2007-2010	46	14	
Patrick Helmes	(Germany)	Forward	2008–2011	57	28	
Renato Augusto	(Brazil)	Midfielder	2008-2012	101	9	
Henrique	(Brazil)	Defender	2008-2009	27	0	
Constant Djakpa	(Ivory Coast)	Defender	2008-2011	9	0	
Stefan Reinartz	(Germany)	Midfielder/Defender	2008-2015	145	11	
Anderson Bamba	(Brazil)	Defender	2008-2010	0	0	
Richard Sukuta-Pasu	(Germany)	Forward	2008-2011	4	0	
Bastian Oczipka	(Germany)	Defender	2008-2012	9	0	
Toni Kroos	(Germany)	Midfielder	2009–2010	43	10	
Daniel Schwaab	(Germany)	Defender	2009–2013	96	0	
Sami Hyypiä	(Finland)	Defender	2009-2011	53	3	
Gábor Király	(Hungary)	Goalkeeper	2009	0	0	
Angelos Charisteas	(Greece)	Forward	2009	13	1	
Tomasz Bobel	(Poland)	Goalkeeper	2009-2011	0	0	
Gonzalo Vásquez	(Chile)	Midfielder/Forward	2009-2011	0	0	
Burak Kaplan	(Turkey) / (Germany)	Midfielder	2009-2011	4	2	
Lars Bender	(Germany)	Defender/Midfielder	2009-2021	256	22	
Fabian Giefer	(Germany)	Goalkeeper	2009-2012	6	0	
Eren Derdiyok	(Switzerland)	Forward	2009-2012 2013–2014	90	25	
Sidney Sam	(Germany)	Forward	2010–2014	92	24	
Thanos Petsos	(Greece)	Midifielder	2010-2012	1	0	
Kevin Kampl	(Slovenia)	Midfielder	2010-2011 2015–2017	53	4	
Nicolai Jørgensen	(Denmark)	Forward	2010-2012	10	0	
Lucas Rocha	(Brazil)	Defender	2010-2012	0	0	
Bernd Leno	(Germany)	Goalkeeper	2011–2018	233	0	
David Yelldell	(United States)	Goalkeeper	2011-2016	1	0	
Hajime Hosogai	(Japan)	Midfielder/Defender	2011-2013	17	0	
Michael Ortega	(Colombia)	Midfielder	2011-2013	7	0	
Karim Bellarabi	(Germany)	Midfielder	2011-2023	215	34	
Ömer Toprak	(Turkey)	Defender	2011-2017	154	5	
Danny da Costa	(Germany)	Defender	2011-2012	6	0	
Vedran Ćorluka	(Croatia)	Defender	2012	7	0	
Dani Carvajal	(Spain)	Defender	2012-2013	32	1	
Niklas Lomb	(Germany)	Goalkeeper	2012-	2	0	
Samed Yeşil	(Germany)	Forward	2012	1	0	
Junior Fernandes	(Chile)	Forward	2012-2014	6	0	
Sebastian Boenisch	(Poland)	Defender	2012-2016	60	3	
Okan Aydın	(Turkey)	Forward	2012-2013	1	0	
Kolja Pusch	(Germany)	Midfielder	2012-2013	0	0	
Philipp Wollscheid	(Germany)	Defender	2012-2015	51	2	
Julian Riedel	(Germany)	Defender	2012-2013	0	0	
Dominik Kohr	(Germany)	Midfielder/Defender	2012-2015 2017–2019	46	1	
Heung Min Son	(South Korea)	Forward	2013–2015	62	21	
Kostas Stafylidis	(Greece)	Midfielder/Defender	2013-2015	1	0	
Roberto Hilbert	(Germany)	Defender/Midifielder	2013-2017	58	1	
Andrés Palop	(Spain)	Goalkeeper	2013-2014	0	0	
Giulio Donati	(Italy)	Defender	2013-2016	43	0	
Emir Spahić	(Bosnia and Herzegovina)	Defender	2013-2015	49	3	
Robbie Kruse	(Australia)	Forward/Midfielder	2013-2017	21	2	
Emre Can	(Germany)	Midfielder/Defender	2013-2014	29	3	
Arkadiusz Milik	(Poland)	Forward	2013-2015	6	0	
Levin Öztunalı	(Germany)	Midfielder	2013-2016	15	0	
Malcolm Cacutalua	(Germany)	Defender	2013-2016	0	0	
Jonas Meffert	(Germany)	Midfielder	2013-2014	0	0	
Julian Brandt	(Germany)	Midfielder	2014–2019	165	34	
Hakan Çalhanoğlu	(Turkey)	Midfielder	2014-2017	79	17	
Vladlen Yurchenko	(Ukraine)	Midfielder	2014-2018	13	1	
Kyriakos Papadopoulos	(Greece)	Defender	2014-2015 2015–2017	16	0	
Ryu Seung-woo	(South Korea)	Forward	2014 2014–2017	0	0	
Wendell	(Brazil)	Defender	2014-2021	186	7	
Tin Jedvaj	(Croatia)	Defender	2014-2015 2015–2021	72	1	
Dario Krešić	(Croatia)	Goalkeeper	2014-2016	1	0	
Josip Drmić	(Switzerland)	Forward	2014-2015	25	6	
Alexander Mühling	(Germany)	Midfielder	2014	0	0	
Javier Hernández	(Mexico)	Forward	2015-2017	54	28	
Jonathan Tah	(Germany)	Defender	2015-2025	291	15	
André Ramalho	(Brazil)	Defender	2015-2018	22	0	
Benjamin Henrichs	(Germany)	Defender/Midfielder	2015-2018	62	0	
Charles Aránguiz	(Chile)	Midfielder	2015-2023	168	10	
Marlon Frey	(Germany)	Midfielder	2015-2018	9	0	
Admir Mehmedi	(Switzerland)	Forward	2015-2018	62	7	
Patrik Džalto	(Germany)	Forward	2015-2017	0	0	
Kai Havertz	(Germany)	Midfielder	2016–2020	118	36	
Julian Baumgartlinger	(Austria)	Midfielder	2016-2022	115	5	
Ramazan Özcan	(Austria)	Goalkeeper	2016-2020	3	0	
Joel Pohjanpalo	(Finland)	Forward	2016-2022	23	7	
Joel Abu Hanna	(Israel)	Defender	2016-2017	0	0	
Aleksandar Dragović	(Austria)	Defender	2016-2021	71	3	
Kevin Volland	(Germany)	Forward	2016-2020	115	44	
Andrejs Cigaņiks	(Latvia)	Midfielder/Defender	2016-2017	0	0	
Leon Bailey	(Jamaica)	Midfielder	2017-2021	119	28	
Lucas Alario	(Argentina)	Forward	2017-2022	126	42	
Panagiotis Retsos	(Greece)	Defender	2017-2022	31	1	
Sven Bender	(Germany)	Defender/Midfielder	2017-2021	107	4	
Lukas Hradecky	(Finland)	Goalkeeper	2018-	221	0	
Paulinho	(Brazil)	Forward/Midfielder	2018-2023	57	8	
Isaac Kiese Thelin	(Sweden)	Forward	2018-2019	6	0	
Tomasz Kucz	(Poland)	Goalkeeper	2018-2019	0	0	
Jakub Bednarczyk	(Poland)	Defender	2018-2019	0	0	
Adrian Stanilewicz	(Poland)	Midfielder	2018-2020	0	0	
Sandra Jessen	(Iceland)	Midfielder	2019-2021	34	1	
Moussa Diaby	(France)	Midfielder	2019-2023	125	31	
Daley Sinkgraven	(Netherlands)	Defender/Midfielder	2019-2023	59	0	
Nadiem Amiri	(Germany)	Midfielder	2019-2024	105	8	
Kerem Demirbay	(Germany)	Midfielder	2019-2023	108	10	
Jan Boller	(Germany)	Defender	2019	0	0	
Edmond Tapsoba	(Burkina Faso)	Defender	2020-	155	3	
Patrik Schick	(Czech Republic)	Forward	2020-	119	62	
Florian Wirtz	(Germany)	Midfielder	2020-2025	140	35	
Samed Onur	(Turkey)	Midfielder	2020-2021	0	0	
Santiago Arias	(Colombia)	Defender	2020-2021	1	0	
Lennart Grill	(Germany)	Goalkeeper	2020-2023	5	0	
Ayman Azhil	(Germany)	Midfielder	2020-2023	1	0	
Emrehan Gedikli	(Germany)	Forward	2020-2022	1	0	
Exequiel Palacios	(Argentina)	Midfielder	2020-	106	11	
Cem Türkmen	(Germany) / (Turkey)	Midfielder	2020-2021	0	0	
Andrey Lunyov	(Russia)	Goalkeeper	2021-2023	2	0	
Timothy Fosu-Mensah	(Netherlands)	Defender/Midfielder	2021-2024	23	0	
Piero Hincapié	(Ecuador)	Defender	2021-	113	5	
Sadik Fofana	(Togo)	Defender/Midfielder	2021-2025	0	0	
Demarai Gray	(Jamaica)	Midfielder	2021	10	1	
Iker Bravo	(Spain)	Forward	2021-2024	1	0	
Zidan Sertdemir	(Denmark)	Midfielder	2021-2023	3	0	
Mitchel Bakker	(Netherlands)	Defender/Midfielder	2021-2023	53	4	
Odilon Kossounou	(Ivory Coast)	Defender	2021-2025	73	1	
Jeremie Frimpong	(Netherlands)	Midfielder/Defender	2021-2025	133	23	
Callum Hudson-Odoi	(England)	Midfielder	2022-2023	14	0	
Sardar Azmoun	(Iran)	Forward	2022-2024	32	5	
Jardell Kanga	(Switzerland)	Forward	2022-2024	0	0	
Adam Hložek	(Czech Republic)	Forward/Midfielder	2022-2024	52	7	
Josip Stanišić	(Croatia)	Defender	2023-2024	20	3	
Gustavo Puerta	(Colombia)	Midfielder	2023-	7	0	
Noah Mbamba	(Belgium)	Midfielder/Defender	2023-	4	0	
Matěj Kovář	(Czech Republic)	Goalkeeper	2023-	3	0	
Nathan Tella	(Nigeria)	Midfielder	2023-	49	7	
Granit Xhaka	(Switzerland)	Midfielder	2023-	65	5	
Arthur	(Brazil)	Defender	2023-	13	0	
Victor Boniface	(Nigeria)	Forward	2023-	42	22	
Ayman Aourir	(Morocco)	Midfielder	2023-2024	0	0	
Ken Izekor	(Germany)	Forward	2023-	0	0	
Patrick Pentz	(Austria)	Goalkeeper	2023-2024	0	0	
Madi Monamay	(Belgium)	Defender	2023-2024	0	0	
Álex Grimaldo	(Spain)	Defender	2023-	64	12	
Jonas Hofmann	(Germany)	Midfielder	2023-	42	7	
Nordi Mukiele	(France)	Defender	2024-	8	0	
Martin Terrier	(France)	Midfielder/Forward	2024-	15	2	
Jeanuël Belocian	(France)	Defender/Midfielder	2024-	5	0	
Borja Iglesias	(Spain)	Forward	2024	7	0	
Artem Stepanov	(Ukraine)	Forward	2024-	0	0	
Kerim Alajbegović	(Bosnia and Herzegovina)	Forward	2024-	0	0	
Aleix García	(Spain)	Midfielder	2024-	27	3	
Alejo Sarco	(Argentina)	Forward	2025-	0	0	
Emiliano Buendía	(Argentina)	Midfielder	2025	11	2	
Mario Hermoso	(Spain)	Defender	2025	4	0	
Mark Flekken	(Netherlands)	Goalkeeper	2025-	0	0	
Abdoulaye Faye	(Senegal)	Defender	2025-	0	0	
Axel Tape	(France)	Midfielder	2025-	0	0	
Ibrahim Maza	(Algeria)	Forward	2025-	0	0	
Jarell Quansah	(England)	Defender	2025-	0	0	

== World Cup players ==
The following players have been selected by their country for the FIFA World Cup finals, while playing for Bayer Leverkusen.

- (South Korea) Cha Bum-kun (1986)
- (Brazil) Jorginho (1990)
- (Brazil) Paulo Sérgio (1994)
- (Germany) Ulf Kirsten (1994, 1998)
- (Romania) Ioan Lupescu (1994)
- (Brazil) Emerson (1998)
- (Denmark) Jan Heintze (1998)
- (Germany) Christian Wörns (1998)
- (Argentina) Diego Placente (2002)
- (Brazil) Lúcio (2002)
- (Croatia) Jurica Vranješ (2002)
- (Croatia) Boris Živković (2002)
- (Germany) Michael Ballack (2002)
- (Germany) Hans-Jörg Butt (2002)
- (Germany) Oliver Neuville (2002)
- (Germany) Carsten Ramelow (2002)
- (Germany) Bernd Schneider (2002, 2006)
- (Turkey) Yıldıray Baştürk (2002)
- (United States) Frankie Hejduk (2002)
- (Brazil) Juan (2006)
- (Croatia) Marko Babić (2006)
- (Germany) Jens Nowotny (2006)
- (Poland) Jacek Krzynówek (2006)
- (Sweden) Fredrik Stenman (2006)
- (Switzerland) Tranquillo Barnetta (2006, 2010)
- (Togo) Assimiou Touré (2006)
- (Ukraine) Andriy Voronin (2006)
- (Chile) Arturo Vidal (2010)
- (Germany) Stefan Kießling (2010)
- (Germany) Toni Kroos (2010)
- (Ghana) Hans Sarpei (2010)
- (Switzerland) Eren Derdiyok (2010)
- (Bosnia and Herzegovina) Emir Spahić (2014)
- (South Korea) Son Heung-min (2014)
- (Mexico) Andrés Guardado (2014)
- (Germany) Julian Brandt (2018)
- (Croatia) Tin Jedvaj (2018)
- (Argentina) Exequiel Palacios (2022, 2026)
- (Ecuador) Piero Hincapié (2022)
- (Iran) Sardar Azmoun (2022)
- (Netherlands) Jeremie Frimpong (2022)
- (Algeria) Ibrahim Maza (2026)
- (Czech Republic) Patrik Schick (2026)
- (England) Jarell Quansah (2026)
- (Netherlands) Mark Flekken (2026)
- (Spain) Álex Grimaldo (2026)
- (United States) Malik Tillman (2026)
