= 1993–94 Bayer 04 Leverkusen season =

Bayer 04 Leverkusen
1993–94 season
- Manager: Dragoslav Stepanović
- Stadium: Ulrich-Haberland-Stadion
- Bundesliga: 3rd
- DFB-Supercup: Runners-up
- DFB-Pokal: Quarter-finals
- Cup Winners Cup: Quarter-finals
- Top goalscorer: League: Paulo Sérgio (17 goals); All: Paulo Sérgio (21 goals)

In the 1993–94 season, Bayer 04 Leverkusen finished in third place in the Bundesliga, lost the DFB-Supercup to Werder Bremen and reached the quarter-finals of the DFB-Pokal and the UEFA Cup Winners' Cup.

== Squad ==
Note: Flags indicate national team as defined under FIFA eligibility rules; some limited exceptions apply. Players may hold more than one non-FIFA nationality.

Pos.	Nation	Player
GK	GER	Dirk Heinen
GK	GER	Rüdiger Vollborn
DF	GER	Andreas Fischer
DF	GER	Franco Foda
DF	GER	Markus Happe
DF	GER	Martin Kree
DF	ROU	Ioan Lupescu
DF	GER	Jens Melzig
DF	NED	Bernard Schuiteman
DF	GER	Christian Wörns
MF	GER	Ralf Becker
MF	GER	Stephan Hanke
MF	CZE	Pavel Hapal
MF	GER	René Rydlewicz
MF	GER	Heiko Scholz
MF	GER	Bernd Schuster

Pos.	Nation	Player
MF	GER	Mathias Stammann
MF	GER	Mario Tolkmitt
FW	GER	Ulf Kirsten
FW	GER	Josef Nehl
FW	GER	Jörg Nowotny
FW	BRA	Paulo Sérgio
FW	GER	Andreas Thom

== Competitions ==
Competition	First match	Last match	Starting round	Final position	Record							
Competition	First match	Last match	Starting round	Final position	Pld	W	D	L	GF	GA	GD	Win %
Bundesliga	6 August 1993	7 May 1994	Matchday 1	3rd	34	14	11	9	60	47	+13	41.18
Supercup	1 August 1993	1 August 1993	Final	Runners-up	1	0	0	1	2	2	+0	0.00
DFB-Pokal	24 August 1993	1 December 1993	Second round	Quarter-finals	4	3	0	1	9	2	+7	75.00
Cup Winners Cup	14 September 1993	15 March 1994	First round	Quarter-finals	5	2	2	1	15	8	+7	40.00
Total					44	19	13	12	86	59	+27	43.18

Source: Competitions

=== DFB-Supercup ===
1 August 1993 Final	Bayer Leverkusen	2-2 (6–7 p)	Werder Bremen	Ulrich-Haberland-Stadion, Leverkusen
17:30	Fischer 61'; Kirsten 97'		Hobsch 90'; Rufer 92' (pen.)	Attendance: 14,000; Referee: Manfred Amerell
	Penalties
	Hapal (penalty scored); Kirsten (penalty scored); Lupescu (penalty scored); Foda (penalty scored); Schuster (penalty scored); Becker (penalty scored); Happe (penalty missed)		(penalty scored) Herzog; (penalty scored) Votava; (penalty scored) Rufer; (penalty scored) Basler; (penalty scored) Borowka; (penalty scored) Wiedener; (penalty scored) Wolter

=== Bundesliga ===
==== League table ====
Pos	Team	Pld	W	D	L	GF	GA	GD	Pts	Qualification or relegation
1	Bayern Munich (C)	34	17	10	7	68	37	+31	44	Qualification to Champions League group stage
2	1. FC Kaiserslautern	34	18	7	9	64	36	+28	43	Qualification to UEFA Cup first round
3	Bayer Leverkusen	34	14	11	9	60	47	+13	39	Qualification to UEFA Cup first round
4	Borussia Dortmund	34	15	9	10	49	45	+4	39	Qualification to UEFA Cup first round
5	Eintracht Frankfurt	34	15	8	11	57	41	+16	38	Qualification to UEFA Cup first round

Source: www.dfb.de
Rules for classification: 1) points; 2) goal difference; 3) number of goals scored.
(C) Champions

==== Matches ====
7 August 1993 1	MSV Duisburg	2-2	Bayer Leverkusen	Wedaustadion, Duisburg
15:30	Wohlert 44'; Reinmayr 66'		Paulo Sérgio 54'; Happe 74'	Attendance: 20,500; Referee: Karl-Heinz Gläser

14 August 1993 2	Bayer Leverkusen	2-1	Bayern Munich	Ulrich-Haberland-Stadion, Leverkusen
15:30	Kirsten 2'; Paulo Sérgio 71'		Thon 26' (pen.)	Attendance: 27,400; Referee: Hartmut Strampe

20 August 1993 3	Wattenscheid 09	1-2	Bayer Leverkusen	Lohrheidestadion, Bochum
19:30	Wolters 32'		Wörns 5'; Hapal 61'	Attendance: 8,500; Referee: Bernhard Zerr

28 August 1993 4	Bayer Leverkusen	2-1	Borussia Dortmund	Ulrich-Haberland-Stadion, Leverkusen
15:30	Paulo Sérgio 20'; Fischer 63'		Rummenigge 28'	Attendance: 27,400; Referee: Hans-Joachim Osmers

1 September 1993 5	Hamburger SV	2-1	Bayer Leverkusen	Volksparkstadion, Hamburg
20:00	Bäron 57'; Letchkov 62'		Thom 77'	Attendance: 48,000; Referee: Hans-Peter Dellwing

4 September 1993 6	Bayer Leverkusen	2-1	Köln	Ulrich-Haberland-Stadion, Leverkusen
15:30	Kirsten 17'; Foda 22' (pen.)		Rudy 40'	Attendance: 27,100; Referee: Hans-Peter Best

7 September 1993 7	Borussia Mönchengladbach	2-2	Bayer Leverkusen	Bökelbergstadion, Mönchengladbach
20:00	Klinkert 14'; Kastenmaier 84'		Paulo Sérgio 8'; Schuster 69' (pen.)	Attendance: 28,000; Referee: Eugen Strigel

18 September 1993 8	Bayer Leverkusen	2-2	Eintracht Frankfurt	Ulrich-Haberland-Stadion, Leverkusen
15:30	Foda 61' (pen.); Fischer 80'		Dickhaut 66'; Andersen 90'	Attendance: 25,000; Referee: Bernd Heynemann

25 September 1993 9	Kaiserslautern	3-2	Bayer Leverkusen	Fritz-Walter-Stadion, Kaiserslautern
15:30	Kuntz 26', 48'; Wagner 31'		Thom 16', 61'	Attendance: 30,375; Referee: Günther Habermann

2 October 1993 10	Bayer Leverkusen	4-0	Nürnberg	Ulrich-Haberland-Stadion, Leverkusen
15:30	Paulo Sérgio 39', 78'; Zietsch 45' (o.g.); Schuster 85'			Attendance: 12,500; Referee: Manfred Harder

8 October 1993 11	Karlsruhe	2-0	Bayer Leverkusen	Wildparkstadion, Karlsruhe
20:00	Bender 22'; Kiryakov 25'			Attendance: 19,000; Referee: Wieland Zeller

16 October 1993 12	Bayer Leverkusen	5-1	Schalke 04	Ulrich-Haberland-Stadion, Leverkusen
15:30	Kirsten 20', 27'; Paulo Sérgio 22', 69'; Thom 81'		Anderbrügge 90'	Attendance: 22,900; Referee: Jürgen Jansen

23 October 1993 13	SC Freiburg	1-0	Bayer Leverkusen	Dreisamstadion, Freiburg
15:30	Todt 47'			Attendance: 15,000; Referee: Hans-Joachim Osmens

30 October 1993 14	Bayer Leverkusen	2-2	Werder Bremen	Ulrich-Haberland-Stadion, Leverkusen
15:30	Thom 43'; Becker 64'		Bode 7'; Rufer 40'	Attendance: 18,700; Referee: Hans Fux

6 November 1993 15	Dynamo Dresden	1-1	Bayer Leverkusen	Rudolf-Harbig-Stadion, Dresden
15:30	Marschall 16'		Kirsten 79'	Attendance: 11,700; Referee: Hermann Albrecht

13 November 1993 16	VfB Stuttgart	1-4	Bayer Leverkusen	Neckarstadion, Stuttgart
15:30	Sverrisson 17'		Paulo Sérgio 26', 36', 79'; Schuster 77'	Attendance: 19,000; Referee: Hans-Peter Dellwing

20 November 1993 17	Bayer Leverkusen	3-1	Leipzig	Ulrich-Haberland-Stadion, Leverkusen
15:30	Schuster 56'; Kirsten 68', 76'		Heidrich 14'	Attendance: 8,300; Referee: Bernd Hauer

27 November 1993 18	Bayer Leverkusen	2-1	MSV Duisburg	Ulrich-Haberland-Stadion, Leverkusen
15:30	Kirsten 44'; Wörns 58'		Steininger 79'	Attendance: 18,700; Referee: Manfred Führer

4 December 1993 19	Bayern Munich	1-1	Bayer Leverkusen	Olympiastadion, Munich
15:30	Labbadia 58'		Rydlewicz 53'	Attendance: 33,000; Referee: Wieland Ziller

11 December 1993 20	Bayer Leverkusen	1-1	Wattenscheid 09	Ulrich-Haberland-Stadion, Leverkusen
15:30	Kirsten 30'		Sané 29'	Attendance: 12,900; Referee: Winfried Buchhart

12 February 1994 21	Borussia Dortmund	1-0	Bayer Leverkusen	Westfalenstadion, Dortmund
15:30	Chapuisat 38'			Attendance: 41,130; Referee: Bernd Heynemann

19 February 1994 22	Bayer Leverkusen	1-2	Hamburger SV	Ulrich-Haberland-Stadion, Leverkusen
15:30	Thom 45'		von Heesen 71'; Albertz 80'	Attendance: 18,900; Referee: Bernhard Zerr

26 February 1994 23	Köln	1-1	Bayer Leverkusen	Müngersdorfer Stadion, Cologne
15:30	Heldt 75'		Wörns 43'	Attendance: 31,000; Referee: Eugen Strigel

5 March 1994 24	Bayer Leverkusen	0-1	Borussia Mönchengladbach	Ulrich-Haberland-Stadion, Leverkusen
15:30			Herrlich 8'	Attendance: 21,700; Referee: Hermann Albrecht

11 March 1994 25	Eintracht Frankfurt	2-0	Bayer Leverkusen	Waldstadion, Frankfurt
20:00	Doll 20'; Yeboah 85'			Attendance: 32,624; Referee: Karl-Heinz Gläser

19 March 1994 26	Bayer Leverkusen	3-2	Kaiserslautern	Ulrich-Haberland-Stadion, Leverkusen
15:30	Foda 27' (pen.); Wörns 63'; Paulo Sérgio 72'		Brehme 36' (pen.); Kuka 86'	Attendance: 16,700; Referee: Manfred Amerell

26 March 1994 27	Nürnberg	2-3	Bayer Leverkusen	Frankenstadion, Nuremberg
15:30	Golke 28'; Wolf 70'		Wörns 39'; Paulo Sérgio 81'; Thom 87'	Attendance: 28,800; Referee: Wolf-Günter Wiesel

2 April 1994 28	Bayer Leverkusen	3-1	Karlsruhe	Ulrich-Haberland-Stadion, Leverkusen
15:30	Paulo Sérgio 19'; Wörns 67'; Schuster 85'		Schmitt 61'	Attendance: 16,900; Referee: Günther Habermann

6 April 1994 29	Schalke 04	1-1	Bayer Leverkusen	Parkstadion, Gelsenkirchen
20:00	Mulder 41'		Paulo Sérgio 73'	Attendance: 38,960; Referee: Manfred Harder

9 April 1994 30	Bayer Leverkusen	2-1	SC Freiburg	Ulrich-Haberland-Stadion, Leverkusen
15:30	Kirsten 25'; Thom 77'		Spies 49'	Attendance: 16,700; Referee: Hartmut Strampe

16 April 1994 31	Werder Bremen	2-1	Bayer Leverkusen	Weserstadion, Bremen
15:30	Basler 34', 80'		Kirsten 89'	Attendance: 22,526; Referee: Hans-Peter Dellwing

24 April 1994 32	Bayer Leverkusen	1-1	Dynamo Dresden	Ulrich-Haberland-Stadion, Leverkusen
18:00	Paulo Sérgio 53'		Jähnig 76'	Attendance: 16,700; Referee: Bernhard Zerr

30 April 1994 33	Bayer Leverkusen	1-1	Stuttgart	Ulrich-Haberland-Stadion, Leverkusen
15:30	Foda 51' (pen.)		Dunga 13'	Attendance: 16,400; Referee: Wieland Ziller

7 May 1994 34	VfB Leipzig	2-3	Bayer Leverkusen	Zentralstadion, Leipzig
15:30	Opoku 20'; Edmond 77'		Hecking 15' (o.g.); Paulo Sérgio 33'; Kirsten 89'	Attendance: 5,100; Referee: Manfred Amerell

=== DFB-Pokal ===
24 August 1993 Second round	Bayer Leverkusen	3–0	Nürnberg	Ulrich-Haberland-Stadion, Leverkusen
17:45	Fischer 10'; Wörns 48'; Kirsten 86'			Attendance: 10,000; Referee: Alfons Berg

10 September 1993 Third round	1. FC Magdeburg	1-5	Bayer Leverkusen	Ernst-Grube-Stadion, Magdeburg
20:00	Grempler 47'		Nehl 25'; Fischer 36'; Paulo Sérgio 69', 88'; Thom 72' (pen.)	Attendance: 20,000; Referee: Bernd Hauer

26 October 1993 Round of 16	Augsburg	0-0 (3–4 p)	Bayer Leverkusen	Rosenaustadion, Augsburg
19:30				Attendance: 18,000; Referee: Roland Schäfer
	Penalties
	Motzke (penalty missed); Heiß (penalty scored); Hecht (penalty scored); Hanke (penalty missed); Becker (penalty scored); Radlmaier (penalty missed)		Foda (penalty scored); Kree (penalty missed); Thom (penalty scored); Wörns (penalty scored); Schuster (penalty missed); Becker (penalty scored)

1 December 1993 Quarter-finals	Dynamo Dresden	1-1 (5–4 p)	Bayer Leverkusen	Rudolf-Harbig-Stadion, Dresden
20:15	Schmäler 99'		Paulo Sérgio 97'	Attendance: 15,400; Referee: Hartmut Strampe
	Penalties
	Schößler (penalty scored); Marschall (penalty scored); Mauscksch (penalty scored); Kmetsch (penalty scored); Pilz (penalty scored)		Paulo Sérgio (penalty scored); Foda (penalty scored); Hapal (penalty missed); Wörns (penalty scored); Thom (penalty scored)
