= 1997–98 Bayer 04 Leverkusen season =

Bayer 04 Leverkusen
1997–98 season
- Manager: Christoph Daum
- Stadium: BayArena
- Bundesliga: 3rd
- DFB-Pokal: Quarter-finals
- UEFA Champions League: Quarter-finals
- Top goalscorer: League: Ulf Kirsten (22); All: Ulf Kirsten (27)

The 1997–98 season was the 94th season in the history of Bayer 04 Leverkusen and the club's 19th consecutive season in the top flight of German football. In addition to the domestic league, Leverkusen participated in this season's editions of the DFB-Pokal and the UEFA Champions League.

== Season summary ==
Leverkusen dropped a place to third in the final league table. They also impressed on their Champions League debut, reaching the quarter-finals before elimination by eventual champions Real Madrid.

== Players ==
=== First-team squad ===
Squad at end of season

Note: Flags indicate national team as defined under FIFA eligibility rules; some limited exceptions apply. Players may hold more than one non-FIFA nationality.

No.	Pos.	Nation	Player
1	GK	GER	Rüdiger Vollborn
2	DF	CRO	Robert Kovač (Note: Kovač was born in West Berlin, West Germany (now Berlin, Germany), but also qualified to represent Croatia and Bosnia and Herzegovina internationally through his parents and made his international debut for Croatia in 1999.)
3	DF	GER	Markus Happe
4	DF	GER	Christian Wörns
5	DF	GER	Jens Nowotny
6	DF	CRO	Boris Živković (Note: Živković was born in Živinice, SFR Yugoslavia (now Bosnia and Herzegovina), but also qualified to represent Croatia internationally and made his international debut for Croatia in 1999.)
7	MF	CRO	Niko Kovač (Note: Kovač was born in West Berlin, West Germany (now Berlin, Germany), but also qualified to represent Croatia and Bosnia and Herzegovina internationally through his parents and made his international debut for Croatia in December 1996.)
9	FW	GER	Ulf Kirsten
10	MF	BRA	Emerson
11	FW	NED	Erik Meijer
12	MF	POL	Adam Ledwoń
14	FW	GER	Markus Feldhoff
15	FW	BRA	Paulo Rink (Note: Rink was born in Curitiba, Paraná, Brazil, but gained German citizenship and made his international debut for Germany in September 1998.)

No.	Pos.	Nation	Player
16	MF	CZE	Martin Frýdek
17	MF	GER	Hans-Peter Lehnhoff
19	DF	DEN	Jan Heintze
20	MF	GER	Dirk Lottner
22	MF	GER	Stefan Beinlich
23	GK	GER	Dirk Heinen
24	FW	GER	Sebastian Helbig
25	MF	GER	Thorsten Nehrbauer
28	DF	GER	Carsten Ramelow
30	MF	LUX	Manuel Cardoni
31	GK	GER	Jörg Schmadtke
—	MF	NOR	Bent Skammelsrud

=== Left club during season ===
Note: Flags indicate national team as defined under FIFA eligibility rules; some limited exceptions apply. Players may hold more than one non-FIFA nationality.

No.	Pos.	Nation	Player
8	MF	GER	René Rydlewicz (to Arminia Bielefeld)
21	MF	GER	Andreas Neuendorf (to Hertha)

No.	Pos.	Nation	Player
—	MF	USA	Claudio Reyna (to Wolfsburg)

=== Bayer 04 Leverkusen II ===
Note: Flags indicate national team as defined under FIFA eligibility rules; some limited exceptions apply. Players may hold more than one non-FIFA nationality.

No.	Pos.	Nation	Player
26	MF	GER	Thorsten Wittek
27	FW	GER	Thomas Reichenberger
29	MF	GER	Markus Zuraski (Note: Zuraski was born in Poland, but also qualified to represent Germany internationally and represented Germany at U-21 level.)

No.	Pos.	Nation	Player
—	MF	GER	Andreas Voss
—	MF	GHA	Daniel Addo

== Transfers ==
=== Out ===
- (Germany) Lars Leese - (England) Barnsley, June, £250,000
- (Germany) Daniel Schumann - (Germany) Freiburg
- (United States) Claudio Reyna - (Germany) Wolfsburg, loan
- (Germany) Mike Rietpietsch - (Germany) Fortuna Düsseldorf
- (Brazil) Zé Elias - (Italy) Inter Milan
