= 1993 DFB-Supercup =

German Supercup
- Match programme cover
- Event: DFB-Supercup
Werder Bremen	Bayer Leverkusen
2	2
- After extra time Werder Bremen won 7–6 on penalties
- Date: 1 August 1993
- Venue: Ulrich-Haberland-Stadion, Leverkusen
- Referee: Manfred Amerell (Munich)
- Attendance: 14,000

The 1993 DFB-Supercup, known as the Panasonic DFB-Supercup for sponsorship purposes, was the 7th DFB-Supercup, an annual football match contested by the winners of the previous season's Bundesliga and DFB-Pokal competitions.

The match was played at the Ulrich-Haberland-Stadion in Leverkusen, and contested by league champions Werder Bremen and cup winners Bayer Leverkusen. Bremen won the match 7–6 on penalties, after a 2–2 draw, claiming their second title.

== Teams ==
Team	Qualification	Previous appearances (bold indicates winners)
Werder Bremen	1992–93 Bundesliga champions	2 (**1988**, 1991 Final)
Bayer Leverkusen	1992–93 DFB-Pokal winners	None

== Match ==
=== Details ===
1 August 1993
17:30 CEST

Werder Bremen	2–2 (a.e.t.)	Bayer Leverkusen
Hobsch 90'; Rufer 92' (pen.)	Report	Fischer 61'; Kirsten 97'
Penalties
Herzog (penalty scored); Votava (penalty scored); Rufer (penalty scored); Basler (penalty scored); Borowka (penalty scored); Wiedener (penalty scored); Wolter (penalty scored)	7–6	(penalty scored) Hapal; (penalty scored) Kirsten; (penalty scored) Lupescu; (penalty scored) Foda; (penalty scored) Schuster; (penalty scored) Becker; (penalty missed) Happe

Ulrich-Haberland-Stadion, Leverkusen
Attendance: 14,000
Referee: Manfred Amerell (Munich)

**Werder Bremen**	**Bayer Leverkusen**

GK	**1**	(Germany) Oliver Reck
SW		(Germany) Frank Neubarth
CB		(Germany) Dietmar Beiersdorfer	(substituted off) 46'
CB		(Germany) Uli Borowka (c)
RWB		(Germany) Dieter Eilts
LWB		(Austria) Andi Herzog
CM		(Germany) Marco Bode	(substituted off) 106'
CM		(Germany) Thomas Wolter
AM		(Germany) Miroslav Votava
CF		(Germany) Bernd Hobsch
CF		(New Zealand) Wynton Rufer
Substitutes:
DF		(Germany) Andree Wiedener	(substituted on) 106'
MF		(Germany) Mario Basler	(substituted on) 46'
Manager:
(Germany) Otto Rehhagel

GK	**1**	(Germany) Rüdiger Vollborn
SW		(Germany) Franco Foda
CB		(Germany) Christian Wörns
CB		(Germany) Jens Melzig	(substituted off) 77'
RWB		(Germany) Andreas Fischer
LWB		(Brazil) Paulo Sérgio
CM		(Romania) Ioan Lupescu
CM		(Czech Republic) Pavel Hapal
AM		(Germany) Bernd Schuster
CF		(Germany) Andreas Thom	(substituted off) 46'
CF		(Germany) Ulf Kirsten (c)
Substitutes:
DF		(Germany) Markus Happe	(substituted on) 46'
MF		(Germany) Ralf Becker	(substituted on) 77'
Manager:
(Federal Republic of Yugoslavia) Dragoslav Stepanović

== See also ==
- 1993–94 Bundesliga
- 1993–94 DFB-Pokal
