= 1991–92 Bayer 04 Leverkusen season =

Bayer 04 Leverkusen
1991–92 season
- Manager: Reinhard Saftig
- Stadium: Ulrich-Haberland-Stadion
- Bundesliga: 6th
- DFB-Pokal: Semi-finals
- Top goalscorer: League: Ulf Kirsten (12); All: Ulf Kirsten (13)
Home colours

The 1991–92 Bayer 04 Leverkusen season was the 45th season in the club's history and the 13th consecutive season playing in the Bundesliga since promotion from 2. Bundesliga in 1979. Leverkusen finished sixth in the league.

The club also participated in the DFB-Pokal where it reached the semi-finals, losing in penalties to Borussia Mönchengladbach.

== Competitions ==
=== Overview ===
Competition	First match	Last match	Starting round	Final position	Record							
Competition	First match	Last match	Starting round	Final position	Pld	W	D	L	GF	GA	GD	Win %
Bundesliga	2 August 1991	16 May 1992	Matchday 1	6th	38	15	13	10	53	39	+14	39.47
DFB-Pokal	18 August 1991	7 April 1992	Second round	Semi-finals	5	4	1	0	10	4	+6	80.00
Total					43	19	14	10	63	43	+20	44.19

Source: Competitions

=== Bundesliga ===
2 August 1991 1	Bayer Leverkusen	1–0	Borussia Mönchengladbach	Leverkusen
20:00	Jorginho 2'	Report		Stadium: Ulrich-Haberland-Stadion; Attendance: 24,000; Referee: Hans Scheuerer

9 August 1991 2	SG Wattenscheid 09	3–0	Bayer Leverkusen	Bochum-Wattenscheid
18:45	Sané 38', 87'; Schupp 82' (pen.)	Report		Stadium: Lohrheidestadion; Attendance: 6,000; Referee: Aron Schmidhuber

14 August 1991 3	Stuttgarter Kickers	0–1	Bayer Leverkusen	Stuttgart
20:00		Report	Kree 81'	Stadium: Neckarstadion; Attendance: 14,000; Referee: Alfons Berg

21 August 1991 4	Bayer Leverkusen	2–1	MSV Duisburg	Leverkusen
20:00	Kirsten 26', 69'	Report	Lyutyi 80'	Stadium: Ulrich-Haberland-Stadion; Attendance: 16,000; Referee: Wolfgang Mierswa

24 August 1991 5	Karlsruher SC	0–0	Bayer Leverkusen	Karlsruhe
15:30		Report		Stadium: Wildparkstadion; Attendance: 16,000; Referee: Hans-Peter Dellwing

27 August 1991 6	Bayer Leverkusen	0–0	Werder Bremen	Leverkusen
20:00		Report		Stadium: Ulrich-Haberland-Stadion; Attendance: 12,000; Referee: Karl-Heinz Gläser

31 August 1991 7	Hansa Rostock	2–2	Bayer Leverkusen	Rostock
15:30	Weichert 13'; Spies 71'	Report	Kree 45', 61' (pen.)	Stadium: Ostseestadion; Attendance: 13,700; Referee: Hans-Jürgen Kasper

7 September 1991 8	Bayer Leverkusen	1–1	Fortuna Düsseldorf	Leverkusen
15:30	Herrlich 67'	Report	Baffoe 39'	Stadium: Ulrich-Haberland-Stadion; Attendance: 11,000; Referee: Eugen Strigel

14 September 1991 9	Schalke 04	0–0	Bayer Leverkusen	Gelsenkirchen
15:30		Report		Stadium: Parkstadion; Attendance: 43,000; Referee: Hermann Albrecht

21 September 1991 10	Bayer Leverkusen	4–0	Dynamo Dresden	Leverkusen
15:30	Fischer 37'; Lupescu 54'; Kree 66'; Schröder 89'	Report		Stadium: Ulrich-Haberland-Stadion; Attendance: 11,300; Referee: Markus Merk

27 September 1991 11	VfL Bochum	0–2	Bayer Leverkusen	Bochum
20:00		Report	Herrlich 85'; Thom 89'	Stadium: Ruhrstadion; Attendance: 12,500; Referee: Michael Malbranc

5 October 1991 12	Bayer Leverkusen	1–1	1. FC Köln	Leverkusen
15:30	Kree 76'	Report	H. Fuchs 90'	Stadium: Ulrich-Haberland-Stadion; Attendance: 21,000; Referee: Manfred Harder

12 October 1991 13	1. FC Kaiserslautern	2–1	Bayer Leverkusen	Kaiserslautern
15:30	Witeczek 60'; Goldbæk 90'	Report	Nehl 61'	Stadium: Fritz-Walter-Stadion; Attendance: 31,187; Referee: Hans Scheuerer

19 October 1991 14	Bayer Leverkusen	1–1	Hamburger SV	Leverkusen
15:30	Buncol 65'	Report	Rohde 81'	Stadium: Ulrich-Haberland-Stadion; Attendance: 13,800; Referee: Günther Habermann

26 October 1991 15	Eintracht Frankfurt	0–1	Bayer Leverkusen	Frankfurt
15:30		Report	Bindewald 13' (o.g.)	Stadium: Waldstadion; Attendance: 33,000; Referee: Wieland Ziller

2 November 1991 16	Bayer Leverkusen	0–1	1. FC Nürnberg	Leverkusen
15:30		Report	Wück 77'	Stadium: Ulrich-Haberland-Stadion; Attendance: 11,000; Referee: Klaus-Dieter Stenzel

9 November 1991 17	Bayern Munich	2–2	Bayer Leverkusen	Munich
15:30	Labbadia 32', 38'	Report	Happe 62'; Kree 70'	Stadium: Olympiastadion; Attendance: 16,000; Referee: Rainer Boos

16 November 1991 18	Bayer Leverkusen	0–2	Borussia Dortmund	Leverkusen
15:30		Report	Rummenigge 69'; Chapuisat 79'	Stadium: Ulrich-Haberland-Stadion; Attendance: 18,000; Referee: Hans-Jürgen Weber

23 November 1991 19	VfB Stuttgart	2–0	Bayer Leverkusen	Stuttgart
15:30	Walter 75', 87'	Report		Stadium: Neckarstadion; Attendance: 21,000; Referee: Aron Schmidhuber

29 November 1991 20	Borussia Mönchengladbach	2–2	Bayer Leverkusen	Mönchengladbach
20:00	Klinkert 49'; Kastenmaier 77'	Report	Thom 20', 74'	Stadium: Bökelbergstadion; Attendance: 14,500; Referee: Lothar Löwer

7 December 1991 21	Bayer Leverkusen	6–1	SG Wattenscheid 09	Leverkusen
15:30	Nehl 6'; Fischer 28', 34', 58'; Kirsten 62', 74'	Report	Ibrahim 41'	Stadium: Ulrich-Haberland-Stadion; Attendance: 8,000; Referee: Werner Föckler

14 December 1991 22	Bayer Leverkusen	3–1	Stuttgarter Kickers	Leverkusen
15:30	Kirsten 46', 74'; Foda 81'	Report	Marin 40' (pen.)	Stadium: Ulrich-Haberland-Stadion; Attendance: 8,000; Referee: Wolfgang Mierswa

9 February 1992 23	MSV Duisburg	1–2	Bayer Leverkusen	Duisburg
18:00	Nijhuis 47'	Report	Thom 19'; Jorginho 83'	Stadium: Wedaustadion; Attendance: 18,000; Referee: Hans Fux

15 February 1992 24	Bayer Leverkusen	2–0	Karlsruher SC	Leverkusen
15:30	Kirsten 71', 76'	Report		Stadium: Ulrich-Haberland-Stadion; Attendance: 8,300; Referee: Lutz Michael Fröhlich

21 February 1992 25	Werder Bremen	1–1	Bayer Leverkusen	Bremen
20:00	Legat 11'	Report	Kirsten 18'	Stadium: Weser-Stadion; Attendance: 13,800; Referee: Bernd Heynemann

28 February 1992 26	Bayer Leverkusen	3–0	Hansa Rostock	Leverkusen
20:00	Foda 17'; Kirsten 67'; Thom 79'	Report		Stadium: Ulrich-Haberland-Stadion; Attendance: 10,000; Referee: Michael Malbranc

7 March 1992 27	Fortuna Düsseldorf	1–1	Bayer Leverkusen	Düsseldorf
15:30	Nehl 46' (o.g.)	Report	Kree 89'	Stadium: Rheinstadion; Attendance: 10,000; Referee: Günther Habermann

14 March 1992 28	Bayer Leverkusen	2–1	Schalke 04	Leverkusen
15:30	Kirsten 30'; Jorginho 35'	Report	Christensen 12'	Stadium: Ulrich-Haberland-Stadion; Attendance: 22,000; Referee: Rainer Boos

20 March 1992 29	Dynamo Dresden	1–0	Bayer Leverkusen	Dresden
20:00	Rösler 84'	Report		Stadium: Rudolf-Harbig-Stadion; Attendance: 15,000; Referee: Hartmut Strampe

28 March 1992 30	Bayer Leverkusen	2–0	VfL Bochum	Leverkusen
15:30	Reekers 25' (o.g.); Kree 83' (pen.)	Report		Stadium: Ulrich-Haberland-Stadion; Attendance: 9,000; Referee: Hans-Peter Best

4 April 1992 31	1. FC Köln	1–1	Bayer Leverkusen	Köln
15:30	Giske 8'	Report	Nehl 69'	Stadium: Müngersdorfer Stadion; Attendance: 23,000; Referee: Michael Prengel

11 April 1992 32	Bayer Leverkusen	3–0	1. FC Kaiserslautern	Leverkusen
15:30	Buncol 4'; Thom 14'; Kirsten 56'	Report		Stadium: Ulrich-Haberland-Stadion; Attendance: 15,000; Referee: Manfred Neuner

18 April 1992 33	Hamburger SV	1–1	Bayer Leverkusen	Hamburg
15:30	Cyroń 73'	Report	Herrlich 53'	Stadium: Volksparkstadion; Attendance: 27,300; Referee: Karl-Heinz Gläser

25 April 1992 34	Bayer Leverkusen	1–3	Eintracht Frankfurt	Leverkusen
15:30	Jorginho 89'	Report	Möller 24'; Weber 69'; Falkenmayer 78'	Stadium: Ulrich-Haberland-Stadion; Attendance: 25,000; Referee: Alfons Berg

1 May 1992 35	1. FC Nürnberg	1–0	Bayer Leverkusen	Nuremberg
20:00	Wagner 57'	Report		Stadium: Frankenstadion; Attendance: 47,300; Referee: Markus Merk

5 May 1992 36	Bayer Leverkusen	2–1	Bayern Munich	Leverkusen
20:00	von Ahlen 7'; Feinbier 59'	Report	Wohlfarth 79'	Stadium: Ulrich-Haberland-Stadion; Attendance: 19,000; Referee: Wieland Ziller

9 May 1992 37	Borussia Dortmund	3–1	Bayer Leverkusen	Dortmund
15:30	Chapuisat 38'; Reinhardt 63'; Povlsen 86'	Report	Jorginho 88'	Stadium: Westfalenstadion; Attendance: 50,120; Referee: Wolf-Günter Wiesel

16 May 1992 38	Bayer Leverkusen	1–2	VfB Stuttgart	Leverkusen
15:30	Kree 20' (pen.)	Report	Walter 43' (pen.); Buchwald 86'	Stadium: Ulrich-Haberland-Stadion; Attendance: 25,500; Referee: Hans-Peter Dellwing

=== DFB Pokal ===
18 August 1991 Second round	Eintracht Trier	0–2	Bayer Leverkusen	Trier
16:00		Report	Wörns 38'; Herrlich 54'	Stadium: Moselstadion; Attendance: 3,000; Referee: Bern Kuhn

3 September 1991 Third round	Bayer Leverkusen	2–0	1. FC Köln	Leverkusen
20:00	Buncol 64'; Fischer 69'	Report		Stadium: Ulrich-Haberland-Stadion; Attendance: 20,000; Referee: Manfred Neuner

24 September 1991 Round of 16	SSV Reutlingen	2–3 (a.e.t.)	Bayer Leverkusen	Reutlingen
17:00	Roth 30', 78'	Report	Thom 12'; Leśniak 75'; Herrlich 101'	Stadium: Stadion an der Kreuzeiche; Attendance: 8,100; Referee: Kurt Wittke

30 October 1991 Quarter-finals	Bayer Leverkusen	1–0 (a.e.t.)	VfB Stuttgart	Leverkusen
20:00	Buchwald 110' (o.g.)	Report		Stadium: Ulrich-Haberland-Stadion; Attendance: 10,000; Referee: Edgar Steinborn

7 April 1992 Semi-finals	Borussia Mönchengladbach	2–2 (a.e.t.) (2–0 p)	Bayer Leverkusen	Mönchengladbach
20:00	Kastenmaier 60'; Criens 95'	Report	Kirsten 51'; Thom 119'	Stadium: Bökelbergstadion; Attendance: 34,000; Referee: Eugen Strigel
	Penalties
	Max (penalty scored); Steffen (penalty missed); Neun (penalty missed); Fach (penalty scored)		(penalty missed) Jorginho; (penalty missed) Herrlich; (penalty missed) Lupescu; (penalty missed) Kree

== Statistics ==
=== Squad statistics ===
No.	Pos	Nat	Player	Total		Bundesliga		DFB-Pokal	
No.	Pos	Nat	Player	Apps	Goals	Apps	Goals	Apps	Goals
	GK	(Germany) GER	Rüdiger Vollborn	43	0	38	0	5	0
	DF	(Germany) GER	Andreas Fischer	42	5	37	4	5	1
	DF	(Germany) GER	Franco Foda	36	2	31	2	5	0
	DF	(Germany) GER	Markus Happe	8	1	8	1	0	0
	DF	(Brazil) BRA	Jorginho	42	5	37	5	5	0
	DF	(Germany) GER	Martin Kree	43	9	38	9	5	0
	DF	(Romania) ROU	Ioan Lupescu	39	1	34	1	5	0
	DF	(Germany) GER	Jürgen Radschuweit	7	0	7	0	0	0
	DF	(Germany) GER	Erich Seckler	6	0	5	0	1	0
	DF	(Germany) GER	Christian Wörns	43	1	38	0	5	1
	MF	(Poland) POL	Andrzej Buncol	27	3	25	2	2	1
	MF	(Germany) GER	Matthias Stammann	30	0	25	0	5	0
	MF	(Germany) GER	Markus von Ahlen	6	1	6	1	0	0
	FW	(Germany) GER	Marcus Feinbier	21	1	18	1	3	0
	FW	(Germany) GER	Heiko Herrlich	33	5	28	3	5	2
	FW	(Germany) GER	Ulf Kirsten	24	13	23	12	1	1
	FW	(Poland) POL	Marek Leśniak	29	1	25	0	4	1
	FW	(Germany) GER	Josef Nehl	24	3	22	3	2	0
	FW	(Germany) GER	Marco Schröder	5	1	4	1	1	0
	FW	(Germany) GER	Andreas Thom	43	8	38	6	5	2
Players that left the team during the season
	DF	(Germany) GER	Alois Reinhardt	2	0	2	0	0	0
