= Seckler =

Seckler is a surname. Notable people with the surname include:

- Curly Seckler (1919–2017), American bluegrass musician
- Erich Seckler (born 1963), German footballer
- Phyllis Seckler (1917–2004), Soror Meral, a member Ordo Templi Orientis

== See also ==
- Sechler (disambiguation)
- Steckler
