= Steckler =

Steckler is a surname. Notable people with the surname include:

- Alfred Steckler (1856–1929), American lawyer and judge
- Jordan Steckler (born 1996), American football offensive tackle
- Len Steckler (1928–2016), American photographer, painter, film director, cinematographer and producer
- Ray Dennis Steckler (1938–2009), American film director and producer
- Vince Steckler (1958–2021), American businessman
- William Elwood Steckler (1913–1995), American federal judge

== See also ==
- Seckler, surname
- Sematary (born 2000 as Zane Steckler), American rapper, songwriter, and record producer
