= Sechler =

Sechler may refer to:

== People ==
- Craig Sechler (born 1951), American film and voice actor
- Ernest Edwin Sechler (1905–1979), aerospace engineer and scientist

== Places ==
- Sechler Run, also known as Sechler's Run, a tributary of Mahoning Creek in Montour County, Pennsylvania, in the United States

== See also ==
- Seckler (disambiguation)
