= Mario Basler =

German football player (born 1968)

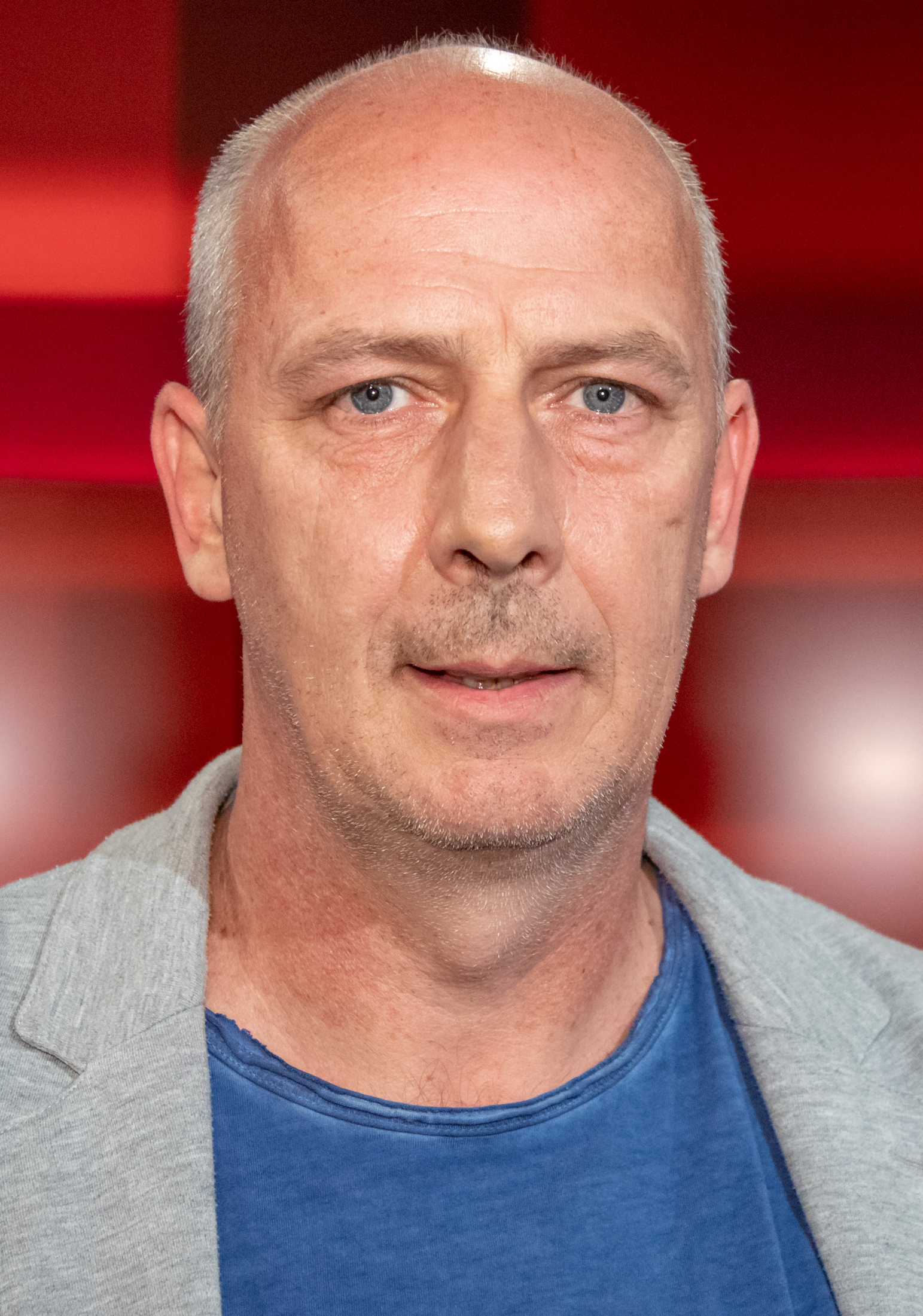
- Basler in 2018

Personal information
- Date of birth: 18 December 1968 (age 57)
- Place of birth: Neustadt (Weinstraße), West Germany
- Height: 1.86 m (6 ft 1 in)
- Position: Right midfielder

Youth career
- 1974–1984: VfL Neustadt
- 1984–1987: 1. FC Kaiserslautern

Senior career*
Years	Team	Apps	(Gls)
1987–1989	1. FC Kaiserslautern	1	(0)
1989–1991	Rot-Weiss Essen	54	(6)
1991–1993	Hertha BSC	74	(17)
1993–1996	Werder Bremen	92	(36)
1996–1999	Bayern Munich	78	(18)
1999–2003	1. FC Kaiserslautern	91	(8)
2003–2004	Al-Rayyan	15	(2)
Total		425	(87)

International career
1994–1998	Germany	30	(2)

Managerial career
- 2004–2005: Jahn Regensburg
- 2007–2008: TuS Koblenz (assistant)
- 2008–2010: Eintracht Trier
- 2010–2011: Wacker Burghausen
- 2011–2012: Rot-Weiß Oberhausen
- 2012–2013: BC Augsburg
- 2015–2016: 1. FC Lokomotive Leipzig (sporting director)
- 2017: Rot-Weiss Frankfurt
- 2022–2024: SC Türkgücü Osnabrück
Medal record
Men's football
Representing Germany
UEFA European Championship
Winner	1996 England
- * Club domestic league appearances and goals

Mario Basler (born 18 December 1968) is a German football manager and former professional player who mainly played as a right midfielder.

A dead-ball specialist, Basler scored numerous goals from free-kicks and two directly from corner kicks during his career, colloquially known as Olympic goals. He was also known for his creativity.

== Club career ==
Born in Neustadt an der Weinstraße, Basler started his career with 1. FC Kaiserslautern, making only one league appearance. In 1993, he joined Bundesliga club SV Werder Bremen, after previously playing for Hertha BSC and Rot-Weiss Essen in the 2. Bundesliga. With Bremen, Basler won the DFB-Pokal in 1994 and finished runner-up in the Bundesliga in 1995. During the 1994–95 season, he was joint top-goalscorer in the Bundesliga with 20 goals.

Basler joined FC Bayern Munich in 1996, where he won the Bundesliga title in 1997 and 1999, and scored the club's winning goal in the 1998 DFB-Pokal final. Basler also scored the opening goal for Bayern Munich in their 1999 UEFA Champions League Final against Manchester United at Camp Nou, Barcelona with a free-kick in the sixth minute of the game. Bayern went on to lose the match 2–1.

Basler rejoined Kaiserslautern in 1999, reaching the UEFA Cup semi-finals in 2001 and the final of the 2002–03 DFB-Pokal, where die roten Teufel were beaten by Basler's former club Bayern Munich.

== International career ==
Basler played 30 games for the Germany national team between 1994 and 1998 and scored two goals. He was named in the squad for the 1994 World Cup, and Euro 1996, the latter of which Germany won, although Basler didn't make any appearances in the tournament.

=== International goals ===
Scores and results list Germany's goal tally first, score column indicates score after each Basler goal.

List of international goals scored by Mario Basler
No.	Date	Venue	Opponent	Score	Result	Competition
1	2 June 1994	Ernst-Happel-Stadion, Vienna, Austria	Austria	5–1	5–1	Friendly
2	30 April 1997	Weserstadion, Bremen, Germany	Ukraine	2–0	2–0	1998 FIFA World Cup qualification

== Coaching career ==
Basler began his coaching career 2004 as head coach of SSV Jahn Regensburg but was sacked after few months. In July 2007, he became assistant coach of TuS Koblenz. After only one year he left TuS Koblenz to sign a contract as head coach and manager with SV Eintracht Trier 05. On 21 February 2010, he was fired by his club Eintracht Trier. He was appointed as manager of SV Wacker Burghausen in August of the same year. When Burghausen was relegated at the end of the 2010–11 season, Basler was sacked.

Basler took over as coach of Rot-Weiß Oberhausen in October 2011 but resigned from his position on 14 September 2012 after four losses in seven games.

In February 2015, Basler got the job as sports director for 1.FC Lokomotive Leipzig.

== Coaching record ==
As of 20 March 2013

Team	From	To	Record							
Team	From	To	G	W	D	L	GF	GA	GD	Win %
Jahn Regensburg	1 July 2004	20 September 2005	43	13	12	18	56	66	−10	30.23
Eintracht Trier	8 September 2008	20 February 2010	52	19	10	23	69	88	−19	36.54
Wacker Burghausen	10 August 2010	14 May 2011	35	9	8	18	43	61	−18	25.71
Rot-Weiß Oberhausen	24 October 2011	14 September 2012	32	9	9	14	33	49	−16	28.13
Total			162	50	39	73	201	264	−63	30.86

== Honours ==
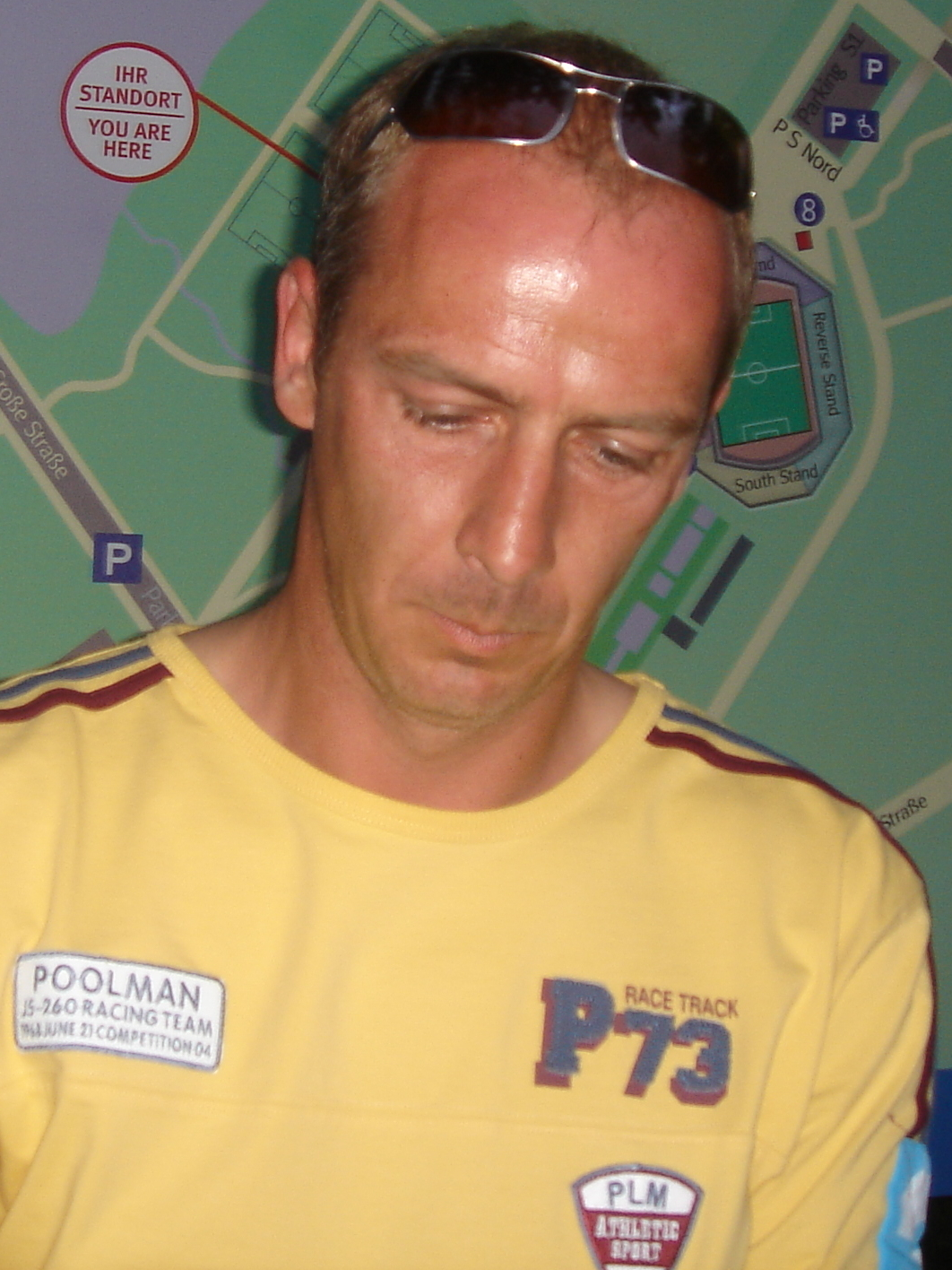
Basler in 2005

Werder Bremen

- DFB-Pokal: 1993–94
- DFL-Supercup: 1993, 1994

Bayern Munich

- Bundesliga: 1996–97, 1998–99
- DFB-Pokal: 1997–98
- DFB-Ligapokal: 1997, 1998
- UEFA Champions League runner-up: 1998–99

Germany

- UEFA European Championship: 1996

Individual

- kicker Torjägerkanone Award: 1994–95 Bundesliga top scorer
- kicker Bundesliga Team of the Season: 1994–95

== See also ==
- Mario Basler: Jetzt geht's los!, Super NES game endorsed by Basler
