= Andree Wiedener =

German footballer

Personal information
- Date of birth: 14 March 1970 (age 56)
- Place of birth: Helmstedt, West Germany
- Height: 1.75 m (5 ft 9 in)
- Position: Defender

Youth career
- 1976–1985: TSV Bahrdorf
- 1985–1987: SV Velpke
- 1987–1988: Werder Bremen

Senior career*
Years	Team	Apps	(Gls)
1988–1993	Werder Bremen (A)	155	(12)
1989–2002	Werder Bremen	164	(3)
2002–2006	Eintracht Frankfurt	76	(1)
Total		395	(16)
- * Club domestic league appearances and goals

Andree Wiedener (born 11 March 1970) is a German former professional footballer who played as a defender for Werder Bremen and Eintracht Frankfurt.

== Honours ==
Werder Bremen

- European Cup Winners' Cup: 1991–92
- Bundesliga 1992–93
- DFL-Supercup: 1993
- DFB-Pokal: 1990–91, 1993–94, 1998–99
- UEFA Intertoto Cup: 1998
- DFB-Ligapokal finalist: 1999
