= Christian Wörns =

German footballer (born 1972)

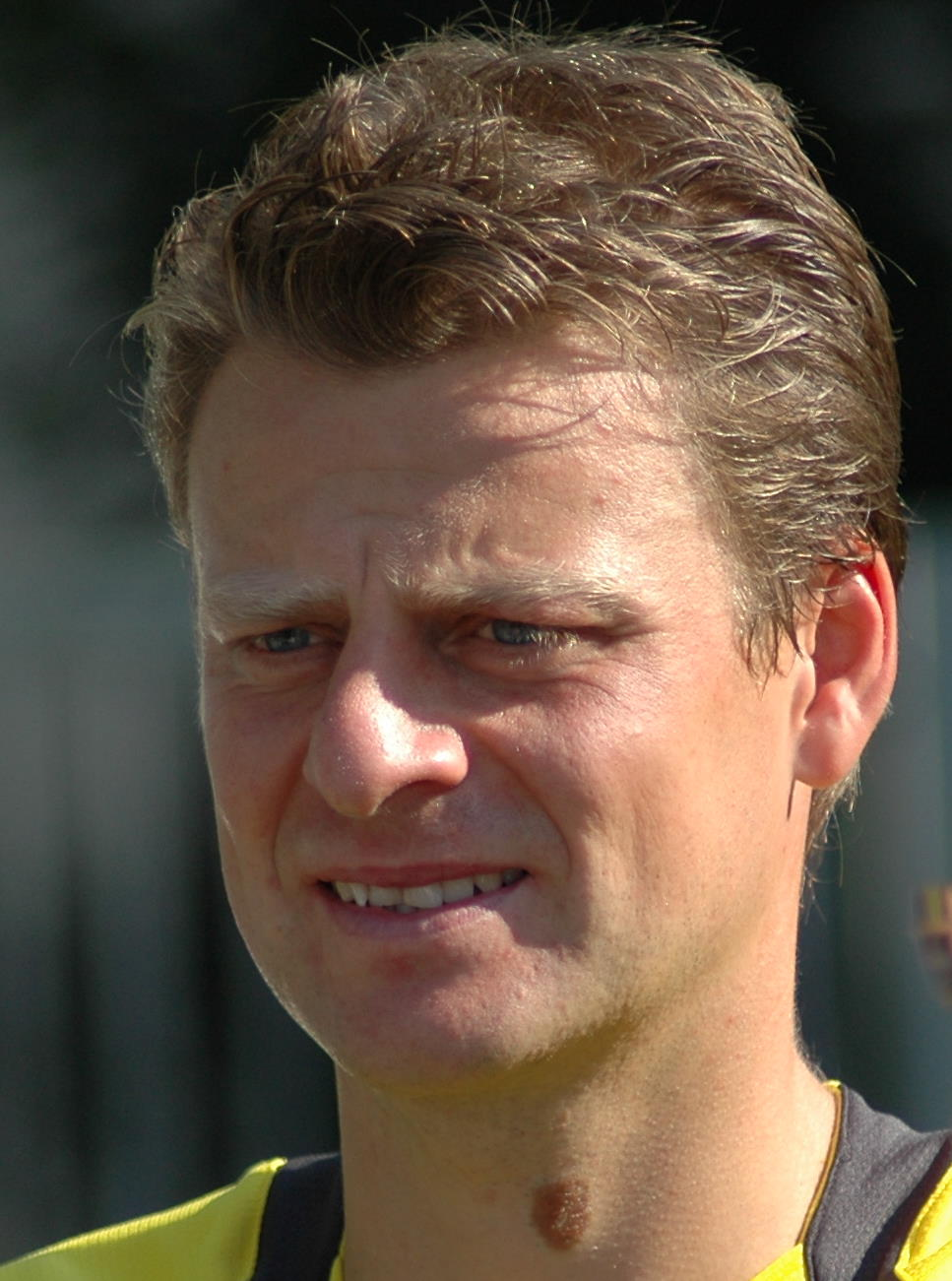
- Wörns training with Borussia Dortmund in 2006

Personal information
- Date of birth: 10 May 1972 (age 54)
- Place of birth: Mannheim, West Germany
- Height: 1.84 m (6 ft 0 in)
- Position: Defender

Team information
- Current team: Germany U19 (manager)

Youth career
- 1980–1985: Phönix Mannheim
- 1985–1989: Waldhof Mannheim

Senior career*
Years	Team	Apps	(Gls)
1989–1991	Waldhof Mannheim	52	(3)
1991–1998	Bayer Leverkusen	211	(13)
1998–1999	Paris Saint-Germain	28	(2)
1999–2008	Borussia Dortmund	240	(14)
Total		531	(31)

International career
1990–1993	Germany U21	16	(1)
1992–2005	Germany	66	(0)

Managerial career
- 2009–2011: Hombrucher SV (youth)
- 2012–2013: VfL Bochum U15
- 2013–2014: Schalke 04 U17
- 2014–2015: SpVgg Unterhaching (assistant)
- 2014–2015: SpVgg Unterhaching U16
- 2016–2017: FC Augsburg II
- 2017–2018: 1860 Munich U19
- 2019–2020: Germany U18
- 2020–2021: Germany U19
- 2021–2022: Germany U20
- 2022–2023: Germany U18
- 2023–2024: Germany U19
- 2024–2025: Germany U18
- 2025–: Germany U19
Medal record
Men's football
Representing Germany
UEFA European Championship
Runner-up	1992 Sweden
Representing Germany (as manager)
UEFA European Under-19 Championship
Runner-up	2026 Wales
- * Club domestic league appearances and goals

Christian Wörns (born 10 May 1972) is a German former professional footballer who played as a defender. Wörns is widely considered one of the finest German defenders of his generation. He started his career with Waldhof Mannheim but played the majority of his career with Bayer Leverkusen and Borussia Dortmund. He also had a short stint with Paris Saint-Germain.

After retirement, Wörns began his coaching career working with youth teams of Hombrucher SV, and has since focused on managing youth sides. He is currently in charge of the Germany national under-19 team.

== Club career ==
Wörns was born in Mannheim. He made his professional debut in the Bundesliga at the young age of 17 years, 3 months and 30 days for Waldhof Mannheim and at the time, was the fourth youngest debutant ever. He played 18 games in his first season and 34 the next in the 2. Bundesliga.

The next year, he transferred to Bayer Leverkusen. Wörns quickly established himself as a defensive stalwart and anchored the strong Leverkusen defense for nearly a decade, together with sweeper Jens Nowotny and Markus Happe.

In 1998, he moved abroad to Paris Saint-Germain in France. He failed to settle in and after one season transferred to Borussia Dortmund. He continued to play at Borussia Dortmund until he retired in 2008.

== International career ==
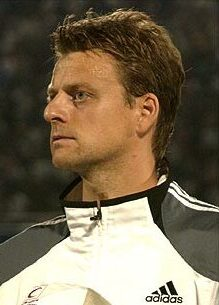
Wörns with Germany in 2004

Wörns represented his country on 66 occasions and did not score.

- Euro 1992: receives a runners-up (silver) medal as a backup squad member.
- Euro 1996: after an injury hit season, Wörns fails to get nominated and misses being on the winning squad.
- World Cup 1998: Considered the best player on the German squad, Wörns played well for much of the tournament. However, in the quarter-final match against Croatia, he fouled Davor Šuker in the 40th minute to stop a possible breakaway run on goal, and received a straight red card from Norwegian referee Rune Pedersen. Three unanswered goals were scored against Germany after his sending off, making him the scapegoat for his country's 0–3 loss.
- World Cup 2002: Doesn't play due to injury, but the team finishes the tournament as runners-up (silver).
- Euro 2004: Germany is eliminated in the group stage after two draws and a loss.
- When Germany manager Jürgen Klinsmann announced the 22 players for a friendly with Italy in Florence, in the lead-up to the 2006 FIFA World Cup, 34-year-old Wörns was only a backup squad member. This prompted an outrageous interview by Wörns. Because he verbally attacked Klinsmann during the interview, the German Football Association took disciplinary action against Wörns and banned from playing as an international. This was similar to what happened to Uli Stein (during the 1986 FIFA World Cup) and Stefan Effenberg (during the 1994 FIFA World Cup). The dropping of Wörns from the national team was roundly panned in Germany, as Italy routed Germany 4–1 in that exhibition game, and Klinsmann bore the brunt of the criticism as the team was ranked only 22nd in the world entering the 2006 FIFA World Cup. Germany ended up finishing the tournament in third place (bronze).

== Managerial career ==
Wörns became manager of FC Augsburg II on 29 December 2015. He took over a team that won 16 points from 20 matches. His first match as manager came on 20 February 2016 in a 4–1 win against FC Ingolstadt 04 II. On 12 March 2016, Augsburg II lost 6–0 to SpVgg Unterhaching.

== Career statistics ==
=== Club ===
Appearances and goals by club, season and competition
Club	Season	League			National cup (Note: Includes DFB-Pokal, Coupe de France)		Continental		Other		Total		Ref.
Club	Season	Division	Apps	Goals	Apps	Goals	Apps	Goals	Apps	Goals	Apps	Goals	Ref.
Waldhof Mannheim	1990–91	Bundesliga	18	0	2	0	—		—		20	0	
Waldhof Mannheim	1989–90	2. Bundesliga	34	2	2	0	—		—		36	2	
Waldhof Mannheim	Total		52	2	4	0	0	0	0	0	56	2	—
Bayer Leverkusen	1991–92	Bundesliga	38	0	5	1	—		—		43	1	
Bayer Leverkusen	1992–93	Bundesliga	34	2	7	0	—		—		41	2	
Bayer Leverkusen	1993–94	Bundesliga	33	6	4	1	6 (Note: Appearance(s) in UEFA Cup Winners' Cup)	1	1 (Note: Appearance in DFB-Supercup)	0	44	8	
Bayer Leverkusen	1994–95	Bundesliga	19	1	2	1	5 (Note: Appearances in UEFA Cup)	0	—		26	2	
Bayer Leverkusen	1995–96	Bundesliga	25	2	3	0	—		—		28	2	
Bayer Leverkusen	1996–97	Bundesliga	33	1	1	0	—		—		34	1	
Bayer Leverkusen	1997–98	Bundesliga	29	1	3	0	9 (Note: Appearances in UEFA Champions League)	0	1 (Note: Appearance(s) in DFL-Ligapokal)	0	42	1	
Bayer Leverkusen	Total		211	13	25	3	20	1	2	0	258	17	—
Paris Saint-Germain	1998–99	Ligue 1	28	2	0	0	1	0	0	0	29	2	
Borussia Dortmund	1999–2000	Bundesliga	26	2	1	0	7 (Note: Four appearances in UEFA Champions League, three appearances in UEFA Cup)	0	2	0	38	2	
Borussia Dortmund	2000–01	Bundesliga	23	3	3	0	—		—		26	3	
Borussia Dortmund	2001–02	Bundesliga	29	2	1	0	16 (Note: Seven appearances in UEFA Champions League, nine appearances in UEFA Cup)	0	2	0	48	2	
Borussia Dortmund	2002–03	Bundesliga	30	0	1	0	10	0	—		41	0	
Borussia Dortmund	2003–04	Bundesliga	31	1	2	0	6 (Note: Four appearances in UEFA Champions League, two appearances in UEFA Cup)	0	3	0	42	1	
Borussia Dortmund	2004–05	Bundesliga	29	1	1	0	—		—		30	1	
Borussia Dortmund	2005–06	Bundesliga	28	2	1	0	2 (Note: Appearances in UEFA Intertoto Cup)	0	—		31	2	
Borussia Dortmund	2006–07	Bundesliga	24	2	2	0	—		—		26	2	
Borussia Dortmund	2007–08	Bundesliga	20	1	3	0	—		—		23	1	
Borussia Dortmund	Total		240	14	15	0	41	0	7	0	305	14	—
Career total			531	31	44	3	61	1	9	0	648	35	—

=== International ===
Appearances and goals by national team and year
National team	Year	Apps	Goals
Germany	1992	4	0
Germany	1993	0	0
Germany	1994	0	0
Germany	1995	4	0
Germany	1996	0	0
Germany	1997	3	0
Germany	1998	12	0
Germany	1999	9	0
Germany	2000	1	0
Germany	2001	5	0
Germany	2002	3	0
Germany	2003	11	0
Germany	2004	11	0
Germany	2005	3	0
Total		66	0

=== Managerial record ===
As of 10 August 2018

Managerial record by team and tenure
Team	From	To	Record					
Team	From	To	M	W	D	L	Win %	Ref.
FC Augsburg II	1 January 2016	6 August 2017	54	21	17	16	38.89	

== Honours ==
=== As a player ===
Bayer Leverkusen

- DFB-Pokal: 1992–93

Paris Saint-Germain

- Trophée des Champions: 1998

Borussia Dortmund

- Bundesliga: 2001–02
- DFB-Pokal runner-up: 2007–08

Germany

- UEFA European Championship runner-up: 1992

Individual

- kicker Bundesliga Team of the Season: 1995–96, 1996–97, 1997–98, 2001–02

=== As a manager ===
Germany U19

- UEFA European Under-19 Championship runner-up: 2026
