= Bernd Hobsch =

German footballer (born 1968)

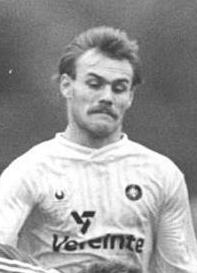
- Hobsch in 1990

Personal information
- Date of birth: 7 May 1968 (age 58)
- Place of birth: Großkugel, East Germany
- Height: 1.82 m (6 ft 0 in)
- Position: Striker

Youth career
- –1986: TSG MAB Schkeuditz

Senior career*
Years	Team	Apps	(Gls)
1986–1987	BSG Chemie Böhlen	32	(11)
1987–1992	1. FC Lok / VfB Leipzig	138	(46)
1992–1997	Werder Bremen	106	(33)
1997–1998	Rennes	3	(0)
1998–1999	1860 Munich	39	(18)
1999–2002	1. FC Nürnberg	29	(9)
2002	Carl Zeiss Jena	6	(3)
Total		355	(120)

International career
1988–1989	East Germany U-21	11	(4)
1993	Germany	1	(0)
- * Club domestic league appearances and goals

Bernd Hobsch (born 7 May 1968) is a German former professional footballer who played as a striker.

== Club career ==
Hobsch appeared in more than 230 East German and German top-flight matches. He won the 1992–93 Bundesliga with Werder Bremen. On 16 September 1993, he scored a hat-trick in his UEFA Champions League debut in a 5–2 win over Dinamo Minsk in the 1993–94 season.

== International career ==
After his Bundesliga title with Bremen in 1993, Hobsch was in the scope of the Germany national team's coach Berti Vogts. He won one cap in the summer of that year in an international friendly against Tunisia.

== Personal life ==
His son Patrick is also a professional footballer who currently plays in the 3. Liga for Jahn Regensburg.

== Honours ==
Werder Bremen

- Bundesliga: 1992–93
- DFL-Supercup: 1993
