= Thorsten Wittek =

German footballer

Personal information
- Date of birth: 31 December 1976 (age 49)
- Place of birth: Berlin, Germany
- Height: 1.78 m (5 ft 10 in)
- Position: Midfielder

Youth career
- –1993: Hertha Zehlendorf
- 1993–1994: Tennis Borussia Berlin

Senior career*
Years	Team	Apps	(Gls)
1994–2002	Bayer 04 Leverkusen II		
2001–2002	Bayer 04 Leverkusen	1	(0)
2002–2006	SV Elversberg	105	(9)
2006–2009	SV Eintracht Trier 05	63	(11)
2009–2010	CS Grevenmacher	6	(0)
2010–2013	Victoria Rosport	20	(10)
- * Club domestic league appearances and goals

Thorsten Wittek (born 31 December 1976) is a German former footballer.

== Career ==
He made his debut on the professional league level in the Bundesliga for Bayer 04 Leverkusen on 20 October 2001 when he came on as a substitute in the 87th minute in a game against VfB Stuttgart.

== Honours ==
Bayer Leverkusen

- UEFA Champions League finalist: 2001–02
- Bundesliga runner-up: 2001–02
- DFB-Pokal finalist: 2001–02
