= Adam Ledwoń =

Polish footballer

- Ledwoń in 2007

Personal information
- Full name: Adam Ryszard Ledwoń
- Date of birth: 15 January 1974
- Place of birth: Olesno, Poland
- Date of death: 11 June 2008 (aged 34)
- Place of death: Klagenfurt, Austria
- Height: 5 ft 11 in (1.80 m)
- Position: Midfielder

Youth career
- Małapanew Ozimek
- Odra Opole

Senior career*
Years	Team	Apps	(Gls)
1991–1998	GKS Katowice	182	(5)
1998–1999	Bayer Leverkusen	10	(0)
1999–2000	Fortuna Köln	28	(0)
2000–2002	Austria Wien	61	(2)
2002–2005	VfB Admira Wacker Mödling	80	(4)
2005–2007	Sturm Graz	54	(1)
2007–2008	Austria Kärnten	30	(0)
Total		445	(12)

International career
1993–1998	Poland	18	(1)
- * Club domestic league appearances and goals

Adam Ryszard Ledwoń (15 January 1974 – 11 June 2008) was a Polish professional footballer who played as a midfielder.

== Career ==
Ledwoń was born in Olesno, Upper Silesia, Poland.

He played for Bayer 04 Leverkusen (1997–1999), Fortuna Köln (1999–2000), Austria Wien (2000–2003), VfB Admira Wacker Mödling (2003–2005), Sturm Graz (2005–2007). The last club for which he played for was the Austrian team, SK Austria Kärnten. He played 18 matches for the Poland national team, scoring one goal.

== Death ==
Ledwoń was found hanged at his home in Klagenfurt in June 2008.

== Honours ==
GKS Katowice

- Polish Cup: 1992–93
