= Sebastian Helbig =

German footballer

Personal information
- Date of birth: 25 April 1977 (age 49)
- Place of birth: Gotha, East Germany
- Height: 1.83 m (6 ft 0 in)
- Position: Forward

Youth career
- Dreigleichen Mühlberg
- –1994: Wacker Gotha
- 1994–1995: Rot-Weiß Erfurt

Senior career*
Years	Team	Apps	(Gls)
1995–1998	Bayer Leverkusen II	78	(21)
1995–1998	Bayer Leverkusen	2	(0)
1998	Rot-Weiß Erfurt	12	(6)
1998–2002	Energie Cottbus	92	(14)
2002–2004	1. FC Köln	31	(0)
2004	SpVgg Unterhaching	12	(1)
2004–2006	Erzgebirge Aue	49	(9)
2006–2008	Carl Zeiss Jena	25	(4)
2008	Dynamo Dresden	3	(0)
2008–2010	FSV Zwickau	39	(10)
Total		343	(65)

International career
1995	Germany U20	2	(0)
- * Club domestic league appearances and goals

Sebastian Helbig (born 25 April 1977) is a German former professional footballer who played as a forward.
