= Ioan Lupescu =

Romanian footballer and manager (born 1968)

Ionuț Lupescu
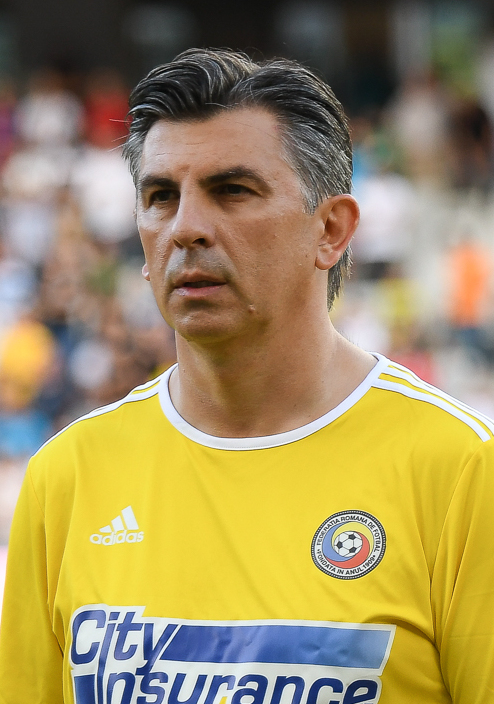
- Lupescu in 2018

Personal information
- Full name: Ioan Angelo Lupescu
- Date of birth: 9 December 1968 (age 57)
- Place of birth: Bucharest, Romania
- Height: 1.83 m (6 ft 0 in)
- Position: Midfielder

Team information
- Current team: CS Dinamo București (head of youth development)

Youth career
- 1975–1977: Admira Wacker
- 1977–1982: Mecanică Fină București
- 1982–1986: Dinamo București

Senior career*
Years	Team	Apps	(Gls)
1986–1990	Dinamo București	98	(11)
1990–1996	Bayer Leverkusen	184	(4)
1996–1998	Borussia Mönchengladbach	43	(7)
1998–2000	Dinamo București	61	(14)
2000	Bursaspor	9	(2)
2000–2002	Dinamo București	24	(0)
2001	→ Al-Hilal (loan)	5	(1)
Total		424	(39)

International career
1988–2000	Romania	74	(6)

Managerial career
- 2004: FCM Bacău
- 2004: FC Brașov
- 2020–2022: Saudi Arabia (technical director)
- 2023–: CS Dinamo București (head of youth development)
- * Club domestic league appearances and goals

Ioan "Ionuț" Angelo Lupescu (born 9 December 1968) is a Romanian former professional footballer who played as a midfielder, currently head of youth development at Liga II club CS Dinamo București.

== Club career ==
=== Youth career ===
Lupescu, nicknamed Kaiserul, was born on 9 December 1968 in Bucharest, Romania and began playing football in 1975 at the youth center of Austrian club Admira Wacker where his father Nicolae played until his retirement. When his family returned to Romania, he wanted to play for Rapid București, but was rejected after a trial. After his family moved from Grivița to the Pantelimon neighborhood, he joined the junior center of Mecanică Fină București where his father was coaching the seniors. However, after a while due to pressure from his mother who wanted to see him play for a bigger team, he went to Dinamo București's youth center where he worked with Iosif Varga.

=== Dinamo București ===
On 21 September 1986 at age 17, Lupescu made his Divizia A debut when coach Mircea Lucescu sent him in the 68th minute to replace Ilie Balaci in Dinamo's 4–1 home victory against SC Bacău. At age 19, Lucescu gave him the captain's armband. His first performance with The Red Dogs was the quarter-finals reached in the 1988–89 European Cup Winners' Cup where they were eliminated on the away goals rule after 1–1 on aggregate by Sampdoria. In the following season the club won The Double with Lupescu playing 29 league matches, scoring four goals, and Lucescu also used him for the entire 6–4 victory against rivals Steaua București in the 1990 Cupa României final. In the same season, he appeared in six matches and scored one goal against Partizan Belgrade in the 1989–90 European Cup Winners' Cup, as Dinamo reached the semi-finals where they were eliminated after a 2–0 aggregate loss to Anderlecht.

=== Bayer Leverkusen ===
After the 1989 Romanian Revolution, Lupescu had offers to play in Italy from Bologna and Mircea Lucescu's team, Pisa. However, he chose to make his own path in football, going to play in Germany for Bayer Leverkusen. He made his Bundesliga debut on 11 August 1990 when he was sent by coach Jürgen Gelsdorf in the 46th minute to replace Marcus Feinbier in a 1–1 draw against Bayern Munich in which he provided the assist for Ulf Kirsten's goal. On 8 September 1990, Lupescu scored his first league goal for Leverkusen in a 3–1 home victory against FC St. Pauli. His biggest performances during his six seasons spent at the club were achieved under coach Dragoslav Stepanović, starting with the triumph in the 1993 DFB-Pokal final in which he played the full 90 minutes in the 1–0 win over Hertha BSC Amateure. In the 1993–94 European Cup Winners' Cup, The Black and Reds reached the quarter-finals, being eliminated on the away goals rule after 5–5 on aggregate by Benfica. In the 1994–95 UEFA Cup campaign, they reached the semi-finals and were eliminated by the eventual winners, Parma, with Lupescu making 10 appearances.

=== Borussia Mönchengladbach ===
In 1996, Lupescu joined fellow Bundesliga team Borussia Mönchengladbach, making his league debut for them on 16 August when coach Bernd Krauss used him the entire match in a 0–0 home draw against Arminia Bielefeld. He netted his first goal on 11 March 1997 in a 2–1 away loss to Hamburg. Lupescu played in both of Borussia's victories as they eliminated Arsenal in the first round of the 1996–97 UEFA Cup. On 2 May 1998, he made his last Bundesliga appearance during a 5–2 home win over Hansa Rostock in which he scored once, totaling 227 matches with 10 goals in the competition.

=== Return to Dinamo ===
Lupescu returned to Dinamo where in the 1998–99 season he netted a personal record of eight goals. In the following season he helped the club win The Double, being used by coach Cornel Dinu in 29 league matches in which he scored six goals. One of these goals was netted in a 3–2 derby win against Steaua that mathematically secured the title. He also played the entire match in the 2–0 victory against Universitatea Craiova in the 2000 Cupa României final.

=== Bursaspor ===
In 2000, Lupescu went to play in Turkey at Bursaspor where he was also the team's captain. He made his Süper Lig debut on 12 August under coach Jörg Berger in a 3–3 draw against Gaziantepspor in which he netted a goal. In the following round he scored once again in a 2–1 away loss to Trabzonspor, and these were his only two goals in a total of nine matches played in the Turkish league.

=== Dinamo and Al-Hilal ===
Lupescu paid his $225,000 termination clause to Bursaspor to return to Dinamo. Coach Dinu played him for the full 90 minutes in the 4–2 victory against Rocar București in the 2001 Cupa României final. He started the 2001–02 season at Dinamo, making his last Divizia A appearance on 30 September 2001 in a 4–2 home win against FCM Bacău, totaling 183 matches with 25 goals in the competition. In October 2001, Lupescu signed a contract with Saudi Arabia club Al-Hilal. There, he worked with Portuguese coach Artur Jorge, but could not adapt, due to the hot climate, playing only five games and scoring once in the Saudi Premier League, before leaving the club in January 2002. However, at the end of the season, both Dinamo and Al-Hilal won the title. Lupescu has a total of 46 games played with three goals scored in European competitions (including two appearances and one goal in the Intertoto Cup). Throughout his career, Lupescu was placed several times among the top five in the Romanian Footballer of the Year ranking, finishing third in both 1991 and 1994.

== International career ==
=== Early years and 1990 World Cup ===
Lupescu made 74 appearances for Romania and scored six goals, making his debut on 3 February 1988 when coach Emerich Jenei sent him in the 81st minute to replace Ioan Sabău in a 2–0 friendly victory against Israel. He played one match in the successful 1990 World Cup qualifiers. Subsequently, he was used by Jenei in three matches during the final tournament, including in the round of 16 where the team got eliminated by Ireland. Afterwards he played eight games and scored one goal in the Euro 1992 qualifiers.

=== 1994 World Cup and Euro 1996 ===
He made nine appearances with three goals scored during the successful 1994 World Cup qualifiers. Lupescu was part of the "Golden Generation", being used by coach Anghel Iordănescu as a starter in all five games during the final tournament. After getting past the group stage, they defeated Argentina with a 3–2 victory in the round of 16. They were eliminated after the penalty shoot-out by Sweden in the quarter-finals, with Lupescu netting his spot kick.

He played nine games during the successful Euro 1996 qualifiers. Lupescu was used by Iordănescu in all three games in the final tournament which were losses to France, Bulgaria and Spain, as his side failed to progress from their group.

=== Final years and Euro 2000 ===
He played two matches in the 1998 World Cup qualifiers, but was not part of the squad that went to the final tournament. Then he went on to play nine games during the successful Euro 2000 qualifiers. Jenei used Lupescu during the final tournament in the group game that ended in a 1–1 draw against Germany when he replaced Viorel Moldovan in the 85th minute. He also played in the quarter-final against Italy that ended with a 2–0 loss when he replaced Constantin Gâlcă in the 68th minute. Lupescu's last national team appearance was on 7 October 2000 in a 3–0 away loss to Italy in the 2002 World Cup qualifiers.

== Managerial career ==
In 2003, Lupescu acquired his coaching license at the German Sport University of Cologne. He started to work as a manager in the second part of the 2003–04 Divizia A season, helping FCM Bacău avoid relegation. In the following season he worked for FC Brașov in Divizia A but left the club after refusing to participate in a fixed match against Gloria Bistrița. He insisted in a discussion with the club's leader, Romeo Pașcu, to play the game fairly, promising that he will leave the club if he loses. Pașcu accepted the deal, but the game was lost with 3–1, so Lupescu resigned. Shortly afterwards he was named general manager of the Romanian Football Federation by president Mircea Sandu. Years later he went to work as a technical director at UEFA and became a member of FIFA's Technical and Development Committee.

In July 2023, Lupescu was appointed as a board member in Mahd Sports Academy, a sports academy based in Riyadh, Saudi Arabia.

== Personal life ==
Lupescu is the son of former Romanian international player Nicolae Lupescu.

In 1994, Lupescu was named Honorary Citizen of Bucharest. On 25 March 2008, he was decorated by President of Romania Traian Băsescu for contributing as general manager of the Romanian Football Federation at the national team's successful Euro 2008 qualifying campaign with the Medalia "Meritul Sportiv" – (The Medal "The Sportive Merit") class III.

In 2010, he appeared in the "Be free" music video of Smiley's band Radio Killer alongside Senegalese international footballer Ousmane N'Doye and former tennis ATP number 1, Ilie Năstase.

== Career statistics ==
Appearances and goals by national team and year
National team	Year	Apps	Goals
Romania	1988	1	0
Romania	1989	3	0
Romania	1990	7	2
Romania	1991	5	0
Romania	1992	5	3
Romania	1993	4	0
Romania	1994	15	0
Romania	1995	5	0
Romania	1996	7	0
Romania	1997	1	0
Romania	1998	4	0
Romania	1999	11	1
Romania	2000	6	0
Total		74	6

Scores and results list Romania's goal tally first, score column indicates score after each Lupescu goal.

List of international goals scored by Ioan Lupescu
No.	Date	Venue	Opponent	Score	Result	Competition
1	29 August 1990	Luzhniki Stadium, Moscow, Soviet Union	Soviet Union	2–0	2–1	Friendly
2	5 December 1990	Stadionul Național, Bucharest, Romania	San Marino	4–0	6–0	Euro 1992 qualifiers
3	6 May 1992	Stadionul Steaua, Bucharest, Romania	Faroe Islands	5–0	7–0	1994 World Cup qualifiers
4	20 May 1992	Stadionul Steaua, Bucharest, Romania	Wales	2–0	5–1	1994 World Cup qualifiers
5	20 May 1992	Stadionul Steaua, Bucharest, Romania	Wales	3–0	5–1	1994 World Cup qualifiers
6	18 August 1999	Tsirio Stadium, Limassol, Cyprus	Cyprus	1–1	2–2	Friendly

== Honours ==
Dinamo București

- Divizia A: 1989–90, 1999–2000, 2001–02
- Cupa României: 1989–90, 1999–2000, 2000–01
- Supercupa României runner-up: 2001

Bayer Leverkusen

- DFB-Pokal: 1992–93
- DFB-Supercup runner-up: 1993
- DFB-Hallenpokal: 1994

Al-Hilal

- Saudi Premier League: 2001–02

Individual

- Romanian Footballer of the Year third place: 1991, 1994

== See also ==
- List of FC Dinamo București players
- List of Bayer 04 Leverkusen players
- List of foreign Bundesliga players
