= Daniel Schumann =

German footballer

Personal information
- Date of birth: February 13, 1977 (age 49)
- Place of birth: Weimar, East Germany
- Height: 1.83 m (6 ft 0 in)
- Position: Defender

Youth career
- TSV Münchenbernsdorf
- 1994–1997: Bayer Leverkusen

Senior career*
Years	Team	Apps	(Gls)
1996–1997	Bayer Leverkusen	0	(0)
1997–2005	SC Freiburg	107	(3)
2005–2007	Kickers Offenbach	48	(0)
2007–2009	FSV Frankfurt	32	(1)
2010–2011	Bayer Leverkusen II	23	(1)
Total		210	(5)

International career
1997–1999	Germany U-21	8	(0)
- * Club domestic league appearances and goals

Daniel Schumann (born February 13, 1977) is a German former professional footballer who played as a defender.

== Honours ==
- Bundesliga runner-up: 1997
