= Jörg Schmadtke =

German football executive (born 1964)

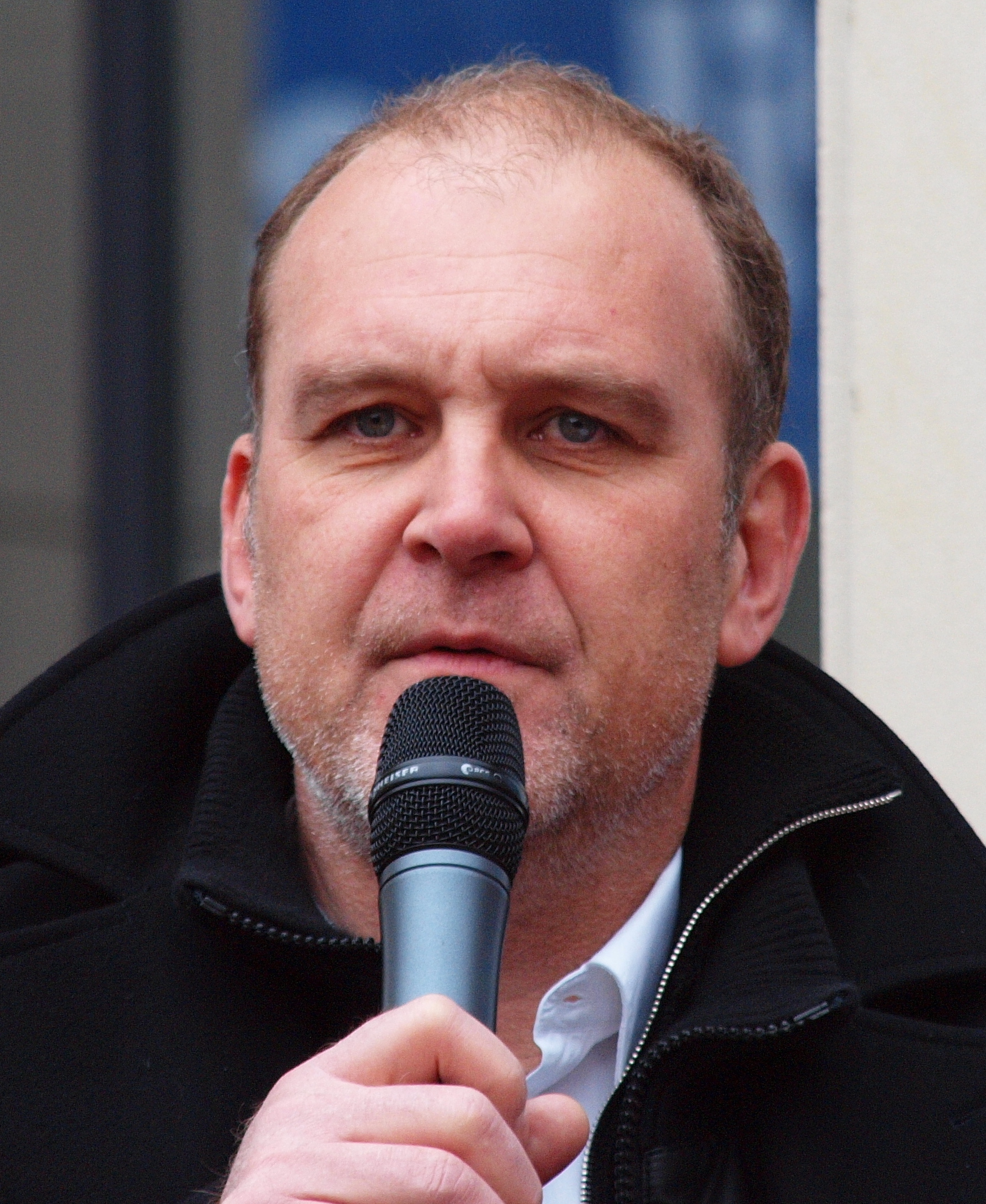
- Schmadtke in 2014

Personal information
- Date of birth: 16 March 1964 (age 62)
- Place of birth: Düsseldorf, West Germany
- Height: 1.82 m (6 ft 0 in)
- Position: Goalkeeper

Team information
- Current team: Hannover 96 (managing director sport)

Senior career*
Years	Team	Apps	(Gls)
1985–1993	Fortuna Düsseldorf	244	(0)
1993–1997	SC Freiburg	131	(0)
1997–1998	Bayer Leverkusen	0	(0)
1998	Borussia Mönchengladbach	0	(0)
Total		375	(0)

Managerial career
- 1994–1995: SC Freiburg U19 (manager)
- 1998–1999: Borussia Mönchengladbach (assistant manager)
- 2001: Fortuna Düsseldorf (goalkeeping coach)
- 2001–2008: Alemannia Aachen (sporting director)
- 2007: Alemannia Aachen (interim manager)
- 2009–2011: Hannover 96 (sporting director)
- 2011–2013: Hannover 96 (managing director sport)
- 2013–2017: 1. FC Köln (sporting director)
- 2018–2023: VfL Wolfsburg (sporting director)
- 2023–2024: Liverpool (sporting director)
- 2026–: Hannover 96 (managing director sport)
- * Club domestic league appearances and goals

Jörg Schmadtke (born 16 March 1964) is a German football executive and former player who is currently the managing director for Hannover 96. He previously held managing director roles at 1. FC Köln and VfL Wolfsburg and was a former sporting director of Premier League club Liverpool during the 2023–2024 season. Schmadtke was involved three times in improving the financial and sports situation of a club considerably.

Schmadtke played as a goalkeeper for Fortuna Düsseldorf (until 1993), SC Freiburg (1993–1997) and Bayer 04 Leverkusen (1997–98), all together 266 games in the German Bundesliga.

== Playing career ==
After A-levels Schmadtke started to study mechanical engineering, later he switched to business administration, but did not complete both. From 1985 to 1993 he played for Fortuna Düsseldorf, from 1993 until 1997 for SC Freiburg, and in the 1997–98 season for Bayer Leverkusen. He played 266 games in the Bundesliga and received nine yellow and one red card. Schmadtke played 106 games in the 2. Bundesliga, with two yellow cards. In September 1998, he helped out a couple of weeks at Borussia Mönchengladbach but did not play.

== Executive career ==
In December 2001, Schmadtke started working as a sporting director at Aachen which had four million Euro debt and were in danger of losing the license. He was able to build up the team and scouting. In the 2004–05 season, Alemannia Aachen reached the German Cup final. The following season, the team earned promotion into the first league. The club prospered financially. In October 2008 he announced to not renew his contract which ran until 2009, and was released from work the next day. Coach Dieter Hecking said that Schmadtke knew every player from the first down to the fourth tier. Transfers included Erik Meijer, Simon Rolfes, Jan Schlaudraff, and Vedad Ibišević.

From summer 2009 up to June 2013, Schmadtke worked as sporting director of Hannover 96. In 2011, his contract was changed to an indefinite contract, and he joined the executive board as "Geschäftsführer Sport". Hannover had a few very successful seasons, both from a sports perspective (they reached the fourth position in the league and played in the UEFA Cup), as well as financially. For private reasons, Schmadtke reduced his workload and also took a couple of weeks timeout in 2012. In April 2013, he asked to terminate his contract. Transfers included Didier Ya Konan, Mohammed Abdellaoue, Lars Stindl, Emanuel Pogatetz, Ron-Robert Zieler, and Mame Biram Diouf.

After being in short talks with Hamburger SV, he started to work as a sporting director for 1. FC Köln in June 2013. Köln managed to be promoted to the Bundesliga and to improve its sports and financial status since then every year. In April 2017, Schmadtke and Wehrle signed a contract extension until 2023. Transfers included Dominique Heintz, Anthony Modeste, Leonardo Bittencourt, Marco Höger, and Jorge Meré.

In 2011 and 2017, Schmadtke received the "manager of the year" award.

Schmadtke resigned on 23 October 2017.

On 22 May 2018, VfL Wolfsburg announced through Twitter the hiring of Schmadtke as the club's new sportvorstand. He was slated to start on 1 July, however on 1 June, VfL Wolfsburg announced on its web page that he was able to start immediately, thanks to a negotiation between 1. FC Köln and VfL Wolfsburg. It was reported in papers that Wolfsburg paid a half-million Euro to Köln to lift the occupational ban that was set on Schmadtke, thus allowing him to work one month earlier than originally planned.

Schmadtke left Wolfsburg in January 2023, and in May of the same year, he joined Liverpool as sporting director. In the summer of 2023, Schmadtke orchestrated a comprehensive midfield overhaul at Liverpool by signing four new players, Alexis Mac Allister, Dominik Szoboszlai, Wataru Endo, and Ryan Gravenberch, to replace outgoing midfielders Jordan Henderson, Fabinho, James Milner, Naby Keïta, and Alex Oxlade-Chamberlain, thereby rejuvenating the team's central core. He left Liverpool in early 2024.

Schamdtke returned to Hannover 96 as managing director effective 1 January 2026, succeeding Marcus Mann, who was signed by Red Bull Salzburg.

== Personal life ==
Schmadtke is married to Andrea and the couple have a son, Nils, who currently works as a sporting director for Borussia Mönchengladbach.
