= Mario Tolkmitt =

German footballer

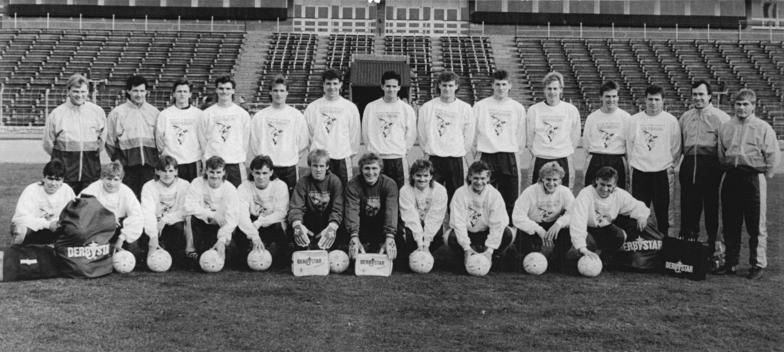
- Tolkmitt (back row, third from left) with FC Berlin in 1990

Personal information
- Date of birth: 30 October 1970 (age 56)
- Height: 1.76 m (5 ft 9 in)
- Position: Midfielder

Youth career
- –1989: Berliner FC Dynamo

Senior career*
Years	Team	Apps	(Gls)
1989–1992	FC Berlin	44	(16)
1990–1991	→ SG Bergmann-Borsig		
1992–1996	Bayer Leverkusen	55	(0)
1997–1998	Fortuna Düsseldorf	17	(0)
- * Club domestic league appearances and goals

Mario Tolkmitt (born 30 October 1970) is a German former professional footballer who played as a midfielder.

Tolkmitt made his first appearance with the first team of BFC Dynamo, then known as FC Berlin, away against HFC Chemie on the 18th matchday of the 1989–90 DDR-Oberliga on 24 Match 1990. He finished the season playing for BSG Bergmann-Borsig Berlin in the second tier DDR-Liga Staffeln A. BSG Bergmann-Borsig Berlin was affiliated to FC Berlin, and effectively functioned as a reserve team for FC Berlin at the time.

Tolkmitt was listed in the squad of the first team of FC Berlin at the beginning of the 1990–91 season, but was transferred on loan to SG Bermann-Borsig during the autumn of 1990. He returned to FC Berlin for the 1991–92 season. Tolkmitt would then be a regular player for FC Berlin in the 1991–92 NOFV-Oberliga. Tolkmitt was then signed by Bayer Leverkusen for the 1992–92 season.
