= Stephan Hanke =

German footballer

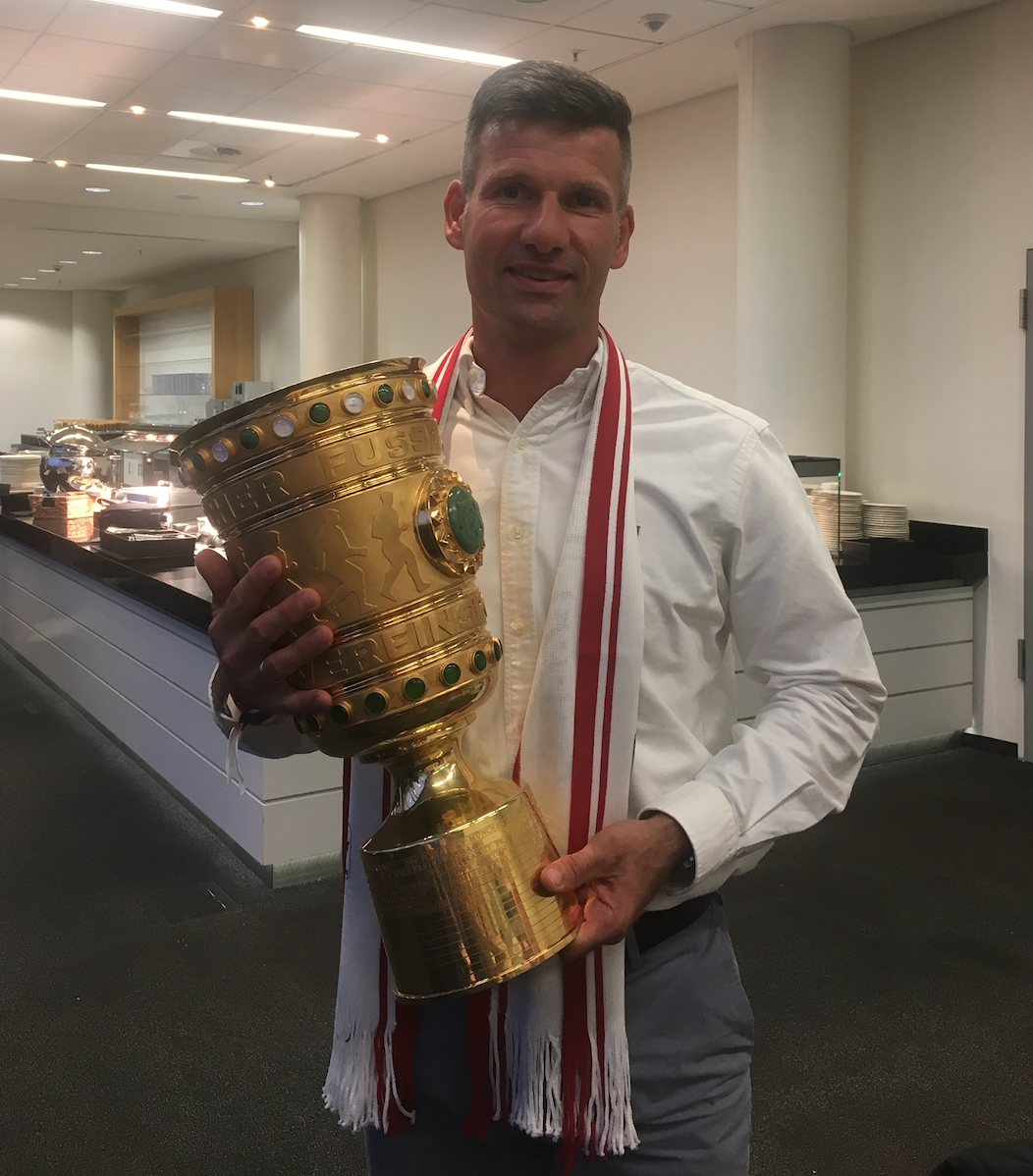
- Hanke in 2018

Personal information
- Full name: Stephan Karl-Heinz Hanke
- Date of birth: 19 October 1972 (age 54)
- Place of birth: Mannheim, West Germany
- Height: 1.80 m (5 ft 11 in)
- Position: Midfielder

Senior career*
Years	Team	Apps	(Gls)
1991–1994	Bayer Leverkusen	1	(0)
1994–2000	FC St. Pauli	180	(4)
2000–2001	Siirtspor	30	(5)
2001–2003	Jahn Regensburg	60	(6)
2003–2006	Hamburger SV II	71	(7)
2006	Rot-Weiß Erfurt	15	(1)
2006–2007	Darmstadt 98	26	(1)
2007–2008	Altona 93	30	(3)
Total		353	(19)
- * Club domestic league appearances and goals

Stephan Karl-Heinz Hanke (born 19 October 1972) is a German former professional footballer who played as a midfielder.

== Career ==
Hanke started his senior career with Bayer 04 Leverkusen in 1991, before moving to FC St. Pauli in 1994. In 2000, he signed for Siirtspor in the Turkish Süper Lig, where he made 32 appearances and scored five goals. After that, he played for German clubs SSV Jahn Regensburg, Hamburger SV II, FC Rot-Weiß Erfurt, and Altonaer FC von 1893, before retiring in 2008.
