= Manfred Amerell =

German association football referee

- Born: 25 February 1947; Munich, Germany
- Died: between 6 - 11 December 2012 (aged 65); Munich, Germany

Domestic
Years	League	Role
1987–1994	Bundesliga	Referee
1984–1994	2. Bundesliga	Referee

Manfred Amerell (born 25 February 1947 in Munich; died between the 6 and 11 December 2012) was a German football Official and Referee. From 1986 to 1994, he refereed 66 games of the Bundesliga; his full-time career was hotelier.

== Life and career ==
Manfred Amerell was a Landesliga player for TSV Milbertshofen. He was then managing director from 1970 to 1975 for TSV 1860 München, then from 1975 to 1979 for FC Augsburg, and from 1979 to 1984 for Karlsruher SC. At the same time, he directed soccer games in the youth and amateur divisions, where he was able to qualify for higher positions. In the 1984–85 season he made his debut in the 2. Bundesliga. On 28 March 1987, he refereed his first game in the Bundesliga. In 1991 and 1994 he directed DFL-Supercup games. A highlight of his career was directing the 1994 DFB-Pokal between SV Werder Bremen and Rot-Weiss Essen. Since ending his career as referee, Amerell has worked as an official of the Deutscher Fußball-Bund, most recently as a referee spokesman for the more than 80,000 active referees in the Deutscher Fußball-Bund. In this position, he repeatedly criticized the player's lack of respect for referee decisions and what he believed to be inappropriate behaviour by club officials on the side lines, to which he spoke of "hypocrites on the bench" who would contribute to a "brutalization" of soccer. For the newspaper Der Tagesspiegel, Amerell commented on current referee decisions in the "Nach-Spiel" column. He ran a hotel until November 2010, in Haunstetten, a district of Augsburg. Amerell was married and had two adult twin daughters. He lived separated from his wife. He was found dead in his Munich apartment on 11 December 2012. After an autopsy was completed, the cause of death was labelled as a heart attack. The burial took place on 20 December 2012 in Westfriedhof (Munich).

== Resignation and referee affair ==
On 9 February 2010, Amerell announced that he was leaving position in the DFB office for health reasons; he also gave up his work on the board of the Süddeutscher Fußball-Verband (SFV). On 12 February, he then declared that he was resigning from all offices because of allegations made against him that he had approached Michael Kempter, a referee under his care, with sexual intentions against his will, since the "publicly made preliminary convictions were of a magnitude that it is no longer bearable for me and my family". Amerell also spoke of addition Smear campaign against him. The DFB stated that the resignation was "right and necessary" DFB President Theo Zwanziger rejected legal action by the DFB against Amerell. The Staatsanwaltschaft in Augsburg had previously announced that Amerell was not being investigated. On 5 November 2010, Amerell was unsuccessful with an injunction against Theo Zwanziger before the Augsburg Landgericht. He wanted to prevent further accusations against him for breach of his official duty. The court stated that there were documents and interrogation records from which violations of his official duties could be proven. In addition, Amerell himself testified that he had lost the necessary distance in relation to Michael Kempter. The verdict in this instance was upheld in February 2010 by the Munich Oberlandesgericht. In that same month, a civil Lawsuit began in which Amerell accused Kempter of violation of his Personality rights and sued for Damages, since Kempter denied that the relationship with Amerell was amicable. The Lawsuit was then initially dismissed on 12 May. on 7 December 2010, the legal dispute before the Stuttgart Oberlandesgericht ended with a settlement. Kempter stated that it cannot be ruled out that in Amerell's perception, his rejection of Amerell's advances could not have appeared clear enough. Amerell in turn, waived his claim for Damages. In the media, the verdict was largely viewed as Amerell's success, as the court found "great differences between Kempter's statements before the DFB, in court, and then in the press".
