= Erich Seckler =

German footballer

Personal information
- Date of birth: September 26, 1963 (age 63)
- Position: Defender

Senior career*
Years	Team	Apps	(Gls)
1987–1992	Bayer 04 Leverkusen	86	(2)
1992–1993	Hertha BSC	7	(0)
- * Club domestic league appearances and goals

Erich Seckler (born September 26, 1963) is a former German footballer.

== Honours ==
- UEFA Cup winner: 1988.
