= Josef Nehl =

German footballer (born 1961)

Jupp Nehl
Personal information
- Full name: Josef Nehl
- Date of birth: 13 June 1961 (age 65)
- Place of birth: Cologne, West Germany
- Height: 1.83 m (6 ft 0 in)
- Positions: Striker; midfielder

Senior career*
Years	Team	Apps	(Gls)
–1984	SC Jülich		
1984–1986	Viktoria Köln		
1986–1991	VfL Bochum	145	(23)
1992–1996	Bayer Leverkusen	56	(5)
Medal record
VfL Bochum
Runner-up	DFB-Pokal	1987–88
Bayer Leverkusen
Winner	DFB-Pokal	1992–93
- * Club domestic league appearances and goals

Josef "Jupp" Nehl (born 13 June 1961) is a German former professional footballer who played as a striker or midfielder.

== Career statistics ==
Appearances and goals by club, season and competition
Club	Season	League			DFB-Pokal		Europe		Total	
Club	Season	Division	Apps	Goals	Apps	Goals	Apps	Goals	Apps	Goals
SC Jülich	1981–82	Oberliga Nordrhein			0	0	—			
SC Jülich	1982–83	Oberliga Nordrhein			—		—			
SC Jülich	1983–84	Oberliga Nordrhein			—		—			
Viktoria Köln	1984–85	Oberliga Nordrhein			—		—			
Viktoria Köln	1985–86	Oberliga Nordrhein			—		—			
VfL Bochum	1986–87	Bundesliga	32	3	1	0	—		33	3
VfL Bochum	1987–88	Bundesliga	27	6	5	1	—		32	7
VfL Bochum	1988–89	Bundesliga	27	3	2	1	—		29	4
VfL Bochum	1989–90	Bundesliga	26	6	1	0	—		27	6
VfL Bochum	1990–91	Bundesliga	28	5	1	0	—		29	5
VfL Bochum	1991–92	Bundesliga	5	0	1	0	—		6	0
Bayer Leverkusen	1991–92	Bundesliga	22	3	2	0	—		24	3
Bayer Leverkusen	1992–93	Bundesliga	17	2	4	0	—		21	2
Bayer Leverkusen	1993–94	Bundesliga	12	0	2	1	1	0	15	1
Bayer Leverkusen	1994–95	Bundesliga	4	0	0	0	0	0	4	0
Bayer Leverkusen	1995–96	Bundesliga	1	0	0	0	—		1	0
Career total					19	3	1	0		
