= Ralf Becker =

German footballer and coach (born 1970)

Personal information
- Date of birth: 26 September 1970 (age 56)
- Place of birth: Leonberg, Baden-Württemberg
- Height: 1.87 m (6 ft 2 in)
- Position: Midfielder

Team information
- Current team: Hannover 96 (sporting director)

Youth career
- 1975–1983: SVGG Hirschlanden-Schöckingen
- 1983–1986: VfB Stuttgart
- 1986–1987: SV Leonberg/Eltingen
- 1987–1989: Stuttgarter Kickers

Senior career*
Years	Team	Apps	(Gls)
1989–1992	TSF Ditzingen II		
1992–1993	TSF Ditzingen	33	(15)
1993–1995	Bayer Leverkusen	23	(1)
1995–1996	FC St. Pauli	15	(1)
1996–1998	Stuttgarter Kickers	15	(1)
1998–1999	TSF Ditzingen	29	(9)
1999–2003	SSV Reutlingen	125	(29)
2003–2006	Karlsruher SC	4	(0)
Total		215	(56)

Managerial career
- 2006–2009: Karlsruher SC (assistant coach)
- 2009–2010: SSV Ulm
- * Club domestic league appearances and goals

Ralf Becker (born 26 September 1970) is a German former football player and coach who works as the sporting director of Hannover 96.

== Playing career ==
Main source:

Becker spent a significant portion of his time as a youth player with VfB Stuttgart, as well as with their smaller rival club Stuttgarter Kickers.

In 1993, he first entered into professional competition by leaving TSF Ditzingen and joining Bundesliga side Bayer 04 Leverkusen, with whom he reached the quarterfinals of the UEFA Cup Winners' Cup in the following year. In 1995, he moved to FC St. Pauli, another Bundesliga team, where he only stayed one season. Following a brief return to TSF Ditzingen in 1998–1999, he spent the remaining years of his playing career with 2. Bundesliga teams SSV Reutlingen 05 and Karlsruher SC, before retiring in 2006.

== Coaching and managerial career ==
Becker acted as the Karlsruher SC's assistant coach under Edmund Becker (no relation) from 2006 to 2009, after which he coached SSV Ulm 1846, a Regionalliga Süd team, for little more than one year. Since stepping back from this position on 30 November 2010, he has not worked as a coach.

From 2010 to 2016, Becker was VfB Stuttgart's chief of scouting. He then became Holstein Kiel's managing director. Under his direction, the club secured a promotion to the 2. Bundesliga in 2016–2017, and only narrowly missed out on a subsequent promotion to the Bundesliga the following year.

On 28 May 2018, Becker joined the newly relegated Hamburger SV as their managing director. He controversially replaced head coach Christian Titz with Hannes Wolf in October 2018, despite his team being merely two points behind the top of the table at the time. At the end of this season, the club missed promotion, causing its executive board to sack Becker and replace him with Jonas Boldt.

On 25 June 2020, Dynamo Dresden announced Becker as their new sports director, following the departure of Ralf Minge. After their relegation in the 2019–20 season, he oversaw the club's immediate return to the 2. Bundesliga. Becker was sacked on 5 March 2024.

Effective 1 June 2025, Becker joined Hannover 96 as their new sporting director, succeeding Marcus Mann, who was promoted to managing director.

== Personal life ==
Becker is married and has three children.
