= Pavel Hapal =

Czech footballer (born 1969)

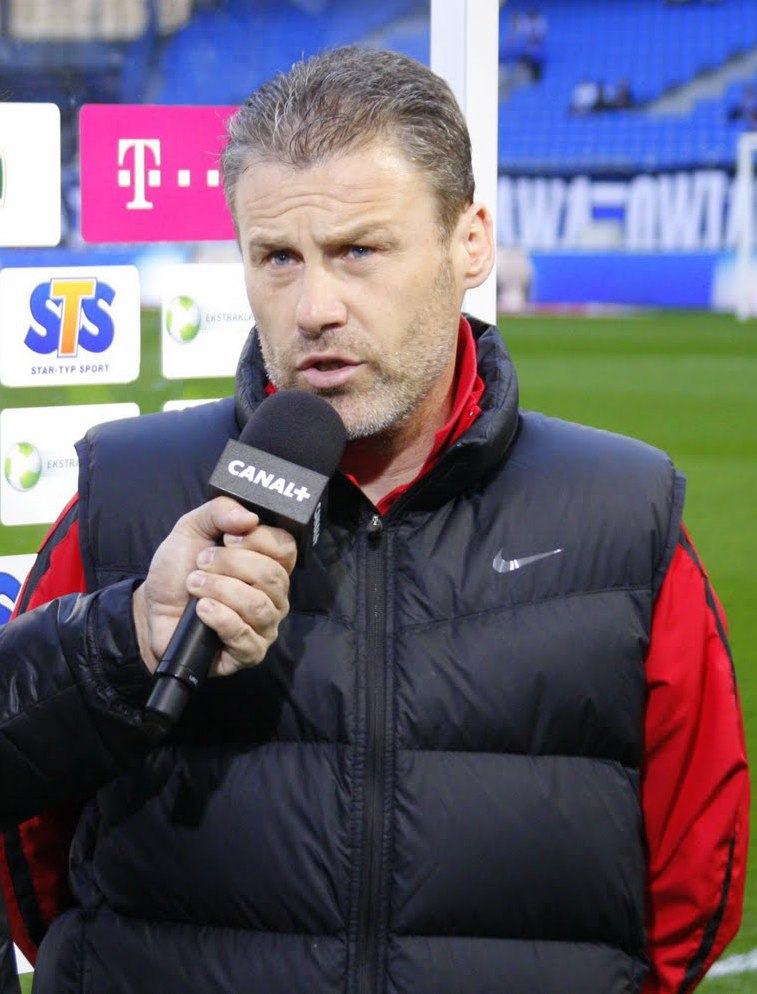
- Hapal as Zagłębie Lubin coach in 2013

Personal information
- Date of birth: 27 July 1969 (age 57)
- Place of birth: Kroměříž, Czechoslovakia
- Height: 1.80 m (5 ft 11 in)
- Position: Midfielder

Youth career
- 1975–1983: Sokol Břest
- 1983–1986: Sigma Olomouc

Senior career*
Years	Team	Apps	(Gls)
1986–1988	Sigma Olomouc	29	(3)
1988–1990	Dukla Prague	37	(7)
1990–1992	Sigma Olomouc	63	(21)
1992–1995	Bayer Leverkusen	86	(13)
1995–1998	Tenerife	33	(1)
1998–1999	Sigma Olomouc	12	(8)
2000	Sparta Prague	6	(2)
2000–2001	Sigma Olomouc	37	(16)
2002	České Budějovice	8	(0)
2002	Jakubčovice		

International career
1991–1993	Czechoslovakia	21	(1)
1994–1996	Czech Republic	10	(0)

Managerial career
- 2003–2004: Opava
- 2004–2005: Tescoma Zlín
- 2005–2006: Baník Ostrava
- 2007–2008: Nitra
- 2008–2009: Mladá Boleslav
- 2009–2011: Žilina
- 2011–2013: Zagłębie Lubin
- 2014: Senica
- 2015–2018: Slovakia U21
- 2018: Sparta Prague
- 2018–2020: Slovakia
- 2022–2025: Baník Ostrava
- 2026: Sigma Olomouc
- * Club domestic league appearances and goals

Pavel Hapal (born 27 July 1969) is a Czech professional football manager and former player.

== Playing career ==
As a footballer, Hapal played for Dukla Prague, CD Tenerife, Sparta Prague, and SK Dynamo České Budějovice. At international level, he earned 31 appearances for Czechoslovakia and Czech Republic, having scored one goal for the former. Hapal ended his career as a player in 2002.

== Managerial career ==
On 31 October 2011, Hapal signed a contract with Polish club Zagłębie Lubin. On 12 March 2014, he signed a contract with Slovakia club FK Senica.

On 6 March 2018, Hapal signed a contract with Czech club AC Sparta Prague. The same year on 22 October, he became the new manager of Slovakia national football team after Ján Kozák was sacked. However, Hapal was sacked as coach of Slovakia on 16 October 2020 following its shock 2–3 home defeat against Israel in the 2020–21 UEFA Nations League B.

On 12 October 2022, Hapal was appointed coach of Baník Ostrava, replacing the dismissed Pavel Vrba. One day before and year later, on 11 October 2025, the club confirmed his dismissal.

On 31 October 2025, Hapal was appointed sporting manager of Sigma Olomouc. On 7 November 2026, after 0-5 away loss against Hradec Králové, Hapal was sacked as the head coach and sporting manager.

== Managerial statistics ==
As of match played 14 October 2020

Managerial record by team and tenure
Team	Nat	From	To	Record							
Team	Nat	From	To	G	W	D	L	GF	GA	GD	Win %
Slovakia	(Slovakia)	22 October 2018	16 October 2020	17	6	4	7	27	23	+4	35.29
Total				17	6	4	7	27	23	+4	35.29

== Honours ==
=== Player ===
Bayer Leverkusen

- DFB-Pokal: 1992–93

Dukla Prague

- Czechoslovak Football Cup: 1989–90

Žilina

- Corgoň Liga: 2009–10
