= Andreas Fischer (footballer) =

German footballer and coach

Personal information
- Date of birth: 20 October 1964 (age 62)
- Place of birth: Paderborn, West Germany
- Height: 1.85 m (6 ft 1 in)
- Position: Defensive midfielder

Senior career*
Years	Team	Apps	(Gls)
–1983	Preußen Münster		
1983–1989	BVL 08 Remscheid		
1989–1994	Bayer Leverkusen	151	(13)
1994–2001	Hamburger SV	152	(7)
2001–2002	Rot-Weiss Essen	20	(3)
2003–2004	SC Verl		

Managerial career
- 2003–2004: SC Verl
- * Club domestic league appearances and goals

Andreas Fischer (born 20 October 1964 in Paderborn) is a German football coach and a former player.

== Honours ==
- DFB-Pokal: 1992–93
