= Rüdiger Vollborn =

German footballer

Personal information
- Date of birth: 12 February 1963 (age 63)
- Place of birth: West Berlin, West Germany
- Height: 1.84 m (6 ft 1/2 in)
- Position: Goalkeeper

Youth career
- Traber Berlin
- Blau-Weiß Berlin
- 1981–1982: Bayer Leverkusen

Senior career*
Years	Team	Apps	(Gls)
1982–1999	Bayer Leverkusen	401	(0)

International career
1982–1984	West Germany U21	9	(0)
Medal record
Men's football
Representing West Germany
FIFA World Youth Championship
Winner	1981 Australia
- * Club domestic league appearances and goals

Rüdiger Vollborn (born 12 February 1963) is a German retired footballer who played as a goalkeeper.

During a 17-year professional career he played solely for Bayer Leverkusen, appearing in a total of 401 Bundesliga games. Vollborn was the club's first-choice goalkeeper and led the club to the 1987–88 UEFA Cup title.

== See also ==
- List of one-club men
