= Markus Happe =

German footballer

Personal information
- Date of birth: 11 February 1972 (age 54)
- Place of birth: Münster, West Germany
- Height: 1.86 m (6 ft 1 in)
- Position: Defender

Youth career
- FC Mecklenbeck
- 1983–1990: VfL Wolbeck

Senior career*
Years	Team	Apps	(Gls)
1990–1991	Preußen Münster	24	(0)
1991–1999	Bayer Leverkusen	188	(8)
2000–2002	Schalke 04	26	(1)
2002–2003	1. FC Köln	28	(2)
2004–2007	Kickers Offenbach	93	(2)
2007–2010	Bayer Leverkusen II	43	(3)
Total		402	(16)

International career
	Germany U-21	9	(1)
- * Club domestic league appearances and goals

Markus Happe (born 11 February 1972 in Münster) is a German former professional footballer who played as a defender.

== Honours ==
Bayer Leverkusen

- DFB-Pokal: 1992–93

Schalke 04

- DFB-Pokal: 2000–01, 2001–02
