= Florian Klugmann =

German footballer

Florian Klugmann (born 9 September 1970) is a German former footballer who played as a goalkeeper. He was an unused substitute in the UEFA Cup Winners' Cup final in 1992, which his team Werder Bremen won, but he never made a professional appearance.

== Football career ==
=== Early career ===
Born in Lübeck in Schleswig-Holstein, Klugmann competed in judo before switching to football at age 11. He played in goal for Eichholzer SV, losing 10–0 on his debut against VfL Bad Schwartau. Spurred by his bad start, he trained harder and earned a move to 1. FC Phönix Lübeck in 1984. He played in nationwide competitions with his new club, earning himself a call-up for the Germany national U-15 team, for whom he was capped three times.

=== Werder Bremen ===
Klugmann turned down Hamburger SV to join SV Werder Bremen in 1987. He found himself playing for the reserve team, with whom he won the amateur championship in 1991; he reflected in 2012 that manager Otto Rehhagel rarely included young players.

In the 1991–92 European Cup Winners' Cup, Klugmann was on the substitutes' bench in the semi-final second leg at home to Club Brugge KV. His team were winning 2–0, meaning a single Belgian away goal would have eliminated them, when starting goalkeeper Oliver Reck pushed an opponent. Anticipating a red card for Reck, Klugmann was ordered by management to warm-up, but Reck only received a yellow card and Klugmann stayed on the bench.

In the final in Lisbon on 6 May 1992, Reck was suspended due to his yellow card, while second-choice goalkeeper Jürgen Rollmann returned from injury to start the game and Klugmann sat on the bench in the 2–0 win over AS Monaco FC. Klugmann took no part in the trophy parade in Bremen as he had to play a reserve team game on the same day.

=== Later career ===
Klugmann turned down the opportunity to remain as a reserve for Werder, and returned to his hometown and joined TSV Pansdorf. One year later, he joined TSV Kücknitz for six months before signing for VfB Lübeck. Due to a cruciate ligament tear, he was third-choice and played only one league game for the club, but was part of their squad that won promotion to the 2. Bundesliga in 1995. After nearly a whole year out of the game, he ended his career with lower-league clubs MTV Ahrensbök, TSV Travemünde and Sereetzer SV until 2007. His final club went bankrupt and refounded during his tenure, rising from the district leagues to the regional ones.

== Post-playing career ==
Klugmann remained involved in football; as of 2012 he was the goalkeeping coach at the reserve youth team of his son's club, TSV Siems. He was living with his wife and son in Sereetz near Ratekau in his home state, and had worked as a driver and warehouse worker for the past 20 years.

== Honours ==
Werder Bremen II

- German amateur football championship: 1990–91

Werder Bremen

- UEFA Cup Winners' Cup: 1991–92
