= SV Werder Bremen in European football =

German club in European football

- The official logo of SV Werder Bremen
- Club: SV Werder Bremen
- Seasons played: 26
- First entry: 1961–62 European Cup Winners' Cup
- Latest entry: 2010–11 UEFA Champions League

Titles
- Champions League: 0
- Europa League: 0 (Note: Runners-up in 2009)
- Cup Winners' Cup: 1: 1992
- Super Cup: 0 (Note: Runners-up in 1992)

Werder Bremen is a successful German football club based in the Free Hanseatic City of Bremen, northern Germany which participated in UEFA competitions on many occasions in the past. The club won the UEFA Cup Winners' Cup in 1992 and the UEFA Intertoto Cup in 1998. They were runners-up of the UEFA Cup in 2008–09 before it was rebranded as the UEFA Europa League (or UEL for short). They were also runners-up of the 1993 European Super Cup.

Currently, they still play in Bundesliga as of 2025. Nonetheless, they haven't been playing in any UEFA-organised competition since the 2010–11 season, when they last competed in UEFA Champions League, reaching the group stage respectively.

== Overall statistics in UEFA competitions ==
=== By competition ===
Competition	Pld	W	D	L	GF	GA	GD	Win %	Ref
European Cup / Champions League	66	27	14	25	109	107	+2	40.91	
UEFA Cup / UEFA Europa League	99	46	24	29	200	123	+77	46.46	
UEFA Super Cup	2	0	1	1	2	3	−1	0.00	
UEFA Cup Winners' Cup	21	11	3	7	39	22	+17	52.38	
UEFA Intertoto Cup	22	14	4	4	36	20	+16	63.64	
Total	210	98	46	66	386	275	+111	46.67	

=== By country ===
Country	Pld	W	D	L	GF	GA	GD	Win %
Austria	4	2	1	1	9	4	+5	50.00
Belarus	4	2	1	1	12	5	+7	50.00
Belgium	12	9	0	3	31	15	+16	75.00
Bulgaria	4	3	1	0	8	2	+6	75.00
Croatia	2	2	0	0	5	3	+2	100.00
Cyprus	4	2	2	0	12	2	+10	50.00
Czech Republic	2	0	0	2	2	4	−2	0.00
Denmark	2	2	0	0	5	2	+3	100.00
England	6	1	1	4	5	13	−8	16.67
France	11	3	3	5	15	23	−8	27.27
Georgia	2	1	1	0	3	2	+1	50.00
Germany	12	4	2	6	16	15	+1	33.33
Greece	6	1	1	4	9	14	−5	16.67
Hungary	2	2	0	0	4	2	+2	100.00
Israel	2	1	1	0	2	0	+2	50.00
Italy	30	11	11	8	49	42	+7	36.67
Kazakhstan	2	2	0	0	8	3	+5	100.00
Netherlands	14	3	4	7	21	21	+0	21.43
Northern Ireland	2	2	0	0	7	0	+7	100.00
Norway	10	5	3	2	22	7	+15	50.00
Portugal	6	4	0	2	13	11	+2	66.67
Romania	2	2	0	0	11	0	+11	100.00
Russia	2	1	0	1	7	6	+1	50.00
Scotland	6	2	2	2	4	5	−1	33.33
Serbia	2	1	0	1	1	3	−2	50.00
Spain	22	8	5	9	31	34	−3	36.36
Sweden	4	3	1	0	11	4	+7	75.00
Switzerland	2	1	0	1	4	2	+2	50.00
Turkey	4	2	1	1	8	3	+5	50.00
Ukraine	5	2	1	2	15	8	+7	40.00

== UEFA record ==
In the table below are depicted SV Werder Bremen's historical results in European football by UEFA competition, according to their competitive history in the passing of time.

Season	Competition	Round	Opponents	Home	Away	Aggregate
1961–62	European Cup Winners' Cup	First round	(Denmark) Aarhus	2–0	3–2	5–2
1961–62	European Cup Winners' Cup	Quarter-finals	(Spain) Atlético Madrid	1–1	1–3	2–4
1965–66	European Cup	Preliminary round	(Cyprus) APOEL	5–0	5–0	10–0
1965–66	European Cup	First round	(Socialist Federal Republic of Yugoslavia) Partizan	1–0	0–3	1–3
1982–83	UEFA Cup	First round	(East Germany) Vorwärts Frankfurt	0–2	3–1	3–3 (a)
1982–83	UEFA Cup	Second round	(Sweden) Brage	2–0	6–2	8–2
1982–83	UEFA Cup	Third round	(Scotland) Dundee United	1–1	1–2	2–3
1983–84	UEFA Cup	First round	(Sweden) Malmö	1–1	2–1	3–2
1983–84	UEFA Cup	Second round	(East Germany) Lokomotive Leipzig	1–1	0–1	1–2
1984–85	UEFA Cup	First round	(Belgium) Anderlecht	0–1	2–1	2–2 (a)
1985–86	UEFA Cup	First round	(Soviet Union) Chornomorets	3–2	1–2	4–4 (a)
1986–87	UEFA Cup	First round	(Spain) Atlético	2–1 (a.e.t.)	0–2	2–3
1987–88	UEFA Cup	First round	(Norway) Mjøndalen	0–1	5–0	5–1
1987–88	UEFA Cup	Second round	(Soviet Union) Spartak	6–2 (a.e.t.)	1–4	7–6
1987–88	UEFA Cup	Third round	(Soviet Union) Dinamo Tbilisi	2–1	1–1	3–2
1987–88	UEFA Cup	Quarter-finals	(Italy) Hellas	1–1	1–0	2–1
1987–88	UEFA Cup	Semi-finals	(West Germany) Bayer Leverkusen	0–0	0–1	0–1
1988–89	European Cup	First round	(East Germany) Berliner FC Dynamo	5–0	0–3	5–3
1988–89	European Cup	Second round	(Scotland) Celtic	0–0	1–0	1–0
1988–89	European Cup	Quarter-finals	(Italy) Milan	0–0	0–1	0–1
1989–90	UEFA Cup	First round	(Norway) Lillestrøm SK	2–0	3–1	5–1
1989–90	UEFA Cup	Second round	Austria Vienna	5–0	0–2	5–2
1989–90	UEFA Cup	Third round	(Italy) Napoli	5–1	3–2	8–3
1989–90	UEFA Cup	Quarter-finals	(Belgium) RFC Liège	0–2	4–1	4–3
1989–90	UEFA Cup	Semi-finals	(Italy) Fiorentina	1–1	0–0	1–1 (a)
1991–92	European Cup Winners' Cup	First round	(Romania) Bacău	5–0	6–0	11–0
1991–92	European Cup Winners' Cup	Second round	(Hungary) Ferencváros	3–2	1–0	4–2
1991–92	European Cup Winners' Cup	Quarter-finals	(Turkey) Galatasaray	2–1	0–0	2–1
1991–92	European Cup Winners' Cup	Semi-finals	(Belgium) Brugge	2–0	0–1	2–1
1991–92	European Cup Winners' Cup	Final	(France) Monaco	2–0		Winners
1992–93	Super Cup	Final	(Spain) Barcelona	1–1	1–2	2–3
1992–93	European Cup Winners' Cup	First round	(Germany) Hannover 96	3–1	1–2	4–3
1992–93	European Cup Winners' Cup	Second round	(Czech Republic) Sparta	2–3	0–1	2–4
1993–94	UEFA Champions League					
1993–94	UEFA Champions League	First round	(Belarus) Dinamo Minsk	5–2	1–1	6–3
1993–94	UEFA Champions League	Second round	(Bulgaria) Levski	1–0	2–2	3–2
1993–94	UEFA Champions League	Group B				
1993–94	UEFA Champions League	Group B	(Italy) Milan	1–1	1–2	3rd place
1993–94	UEFA Champions League	Group B	(Belgium) Anderlecht	5–3	2–1	3rd place
1993–94	UEFA Champions League	Group B	(Portugal) Porto	0–5	2–3	3rd place
1994–95	UEFA Cup Winners' Cup	Group B				
1994–95	UEFA Cup Winners' Cup	First round	(Israel) Maccabi Tel Aviv	2–0	0–0	2–0
1994–95	UEFA Cup Winners' Cup	Second round	(Netherlands) Feyenoord	3–4	0–1	3–5
1995–96	UEFA Cup					
1995–96	UEFA Cup	First round	(Northern Ireland) Glenavon	5–0	2–0	7–0
1995–96	UEFA Cup	Second round	(Belarus) Dinamo Minsk	5–0	1–2	6–2
1995–96	UEFA Cup	Third round	(Netherlands) PSV	0–0	1–2	1–2
1998–99	UEFA Cup					
1998–99	UEFA Cup	First round	(Norway) Brann	4–0 (a.e.t.)	0–2	4–2
1998–99	UEFA Cup	Second round	(France) Marseille	1–1	2–3	3–4
1999–2000	UEFA Cup					
1999–2000	UEFA Cup	First round	(Norway) Bodø/Glimt	1–1	5–0	6–1
1999–2000	UEFA Cup	Second round	(Norway) Viking	0–0	2–2 (a)	2–2
1999–2000	UEFA Cup	Third round	(France) Lyon	4–0	0–3	4–3
1999–2000	UEFA Cup	Fourth round	(Italy) Parma	3–1	0–1	3–2
1999–2000	UEFA Cup	Quarter-finals	(England) Arsenal	2–4	0–2	2–6
2000–01	UEFA Cup					
2000–01	UEFA Cup	First round	(Turkey) Antalyaspor	6–0	0–2	6–2
2000–01	UEFA Cup	Second round	(Belgium) Genk	4–1	5–2	9–3
2000–01	UEFA Cup	Third round	(France) Bordeaux	0–0	1–4	1–4
2002–03	UEFA Cup					
2002–03	UEFA Cup	First round	(Ukraine) Metalurh Donetsk	8–0	2–2	10–2
2002–03	UEFA Cup	Second round	(Netherlands) Vitesse	3–3	1–2	4–5
2004–05	UEFA Champions League	Group G	(Italy) Internazionale	1–1	0–2	2nd place
2004–05	UEFA Champions League	Group G	(Spain) Valencia	2–1	2–0	2nd place
2004–05	UEFA Champions League	Group G	(Belgium) Anderlecht	5–1	2–1	2nd place
2004–05	UEFA Champions League	Round of 16	(France) Lyon	0–3	2–7	2–10
2005–06	UEFA Champions League	Third qualifying round	(Switzerland) Basel	3–0	1–2	4–2
2005–06	UEFA Champions League	Group C	(Spain) Barcelona	0–2	1–3	2nd place
2005–06	UEFA Champions League	Group C	(Italy) Udinese	4–3	1–1	2nd place
2005–06	UEFA Champions League	Group C	(Greece) Panathinaikos	5–1	1–2	2nd place
2005–06	UEFA Champions League	Round of 16	(Italy) Juventus	3–2	1–2	4–4 (a)
2006–07	UEFA Champions League					
2006–07	UEFA Champions League	Group A	(Spain) Barcelona	1–1	0–2	3rd place
2006–07	UEFA Champions League	Group A	(England) Chelsea	1–0	0–2	3rd place
2006–07	UEFA Champions League	Group A	(Bulgaria) Levski	2–0	3–0	3rd place
2006–07	UEFA Cup	Round of 32	(Netherlands) Ajax	3–0	1–3	4–3
2006–07	UEFA Cup	Round of 16	(Spain) Celta Vigo	1–0	2–0	3–0
2006–07	UEFA Cup	Quarter-finals	(Netherlands) AZ Alkmaar	0–0	4–1	4–1
2006–07	UEFA Cup	Semi-finals	(Spain) Espanyol	0–3	1–2	1–5
2007–08	UEFA Champions League	Third qualifying round	(Croatia) Dinamo Zagreb	2–1	3–2	5–3
2007–08	UEFA Champions League	Group C	(Spain) Real Madrid	3–2	1–2	3nd place
2007–08	UEFA Champions League	Group C	(Greece) Olympiacos	1–3	0–3	3nd place
2007–08	UEFA Champions League	Group C	(Italy) Lazio	2–1	1–2	3nd place
2007–08	UEFA Cup	Round of 32	(Portugal) Braga	3–0	1–0	4–0
2007–08	UEFA Cup	Round of 16	(Scotland) Rangers	1–0	0–2	1–2
2008–09	UEFA Champions League					
2008–09	UEFA Champions League	Group A	(Italy) Internazionale	2–1	1–1	3rd place
2008–09	UEFA Champions League	Group A	(Greece) Panathinaikos	0–3	2–2	3rd place
2008–09	UEFA Champions League	Group A	(Cyprus) Anorthosis Famagusta	0–0	2–2	3rd place
2008–09	UEFA Cup	Round of 32	(Italy) Milan	1–1	2–2	3–3 (a)
2008–09	UEFA Cup	Round of 16	(France) Saint-Étienne	1–0	2–2	3–2
2008–09	UEFA Cup	Quarter-finals	(Italy) Udinese	3–1	3–3	6–4
2008–09	UEFA Cup	Semi-finals	(Germany) Hamburger SV	0–1	3–2	3–3 (a)
2008–09	UEFA Cup	Final	(Ukraine) Shakhtar Donetsk	1–2 (a.e.t.)		Runner-up
2009–10	UEFA Europa League	Play-off round	(Kazakhstan) Aktobe	6–3	2–0	8–3
2009–10	UEFA Europa League	Group L	(Spain) Athletic	3–1	3–0	1st place
2009–10	UEFA Europa League	Group L	(Portugal) Nacional	4–1	3–2	1st place
2009–10	UEFA Europa League	Group L	Austria Wien	2–0	2–2	1st place
2009–10	UEFA Europa League	Round of 32	(Netherlands) Twente	4–1	0–1	4–2
2009–10	UEFA Europa League	Round of 16	(Spain) Valencia	4–4	1–1	5–5 (a)
2010–11	UEFA Champions League	Play-off round	(Italy) Sampdoria	3–1	2–3 (a.e.t.)	5–4
2010–11	UEFA Champions League	Group A	(England) Tottenham	2–2	0–3	4th place
2010–11	UEFA Champions League	Group A	(Italy) Internazionale	3–0	0–4	4th place
2010–11	UEFA Champions League	Group A	(Netherlands) Twente	0–2	1–1	4th place
