= Benjamin Clément =

French footballer (born 1966)

Personal information
- Date of birth: 10 December 1966 (age 59)
- Place of birth: Paris, France
- Position: Striker

Youth career
- Paris FC

Senior career*
Years	Team	Apps	(Gls)
1986–1989	Red Star		
1989–1992	Monaco	42	(6)
1992–1995	Sochaux		
1995–1998	Laval		
1999	Sanremese		
1999–2000	Red Star		
- * Club domestic league appearances and goals

Benjamin Clément (born 10 December 1966) is a French former professional footballer who played as a striker. He was part of AS Monaco FC squad at the 1992 UEFA Cup Winners' Cup Final.
