= FC Shakhtar Donetsk in European football =

Ukrainian club in European football

- Club: Shakhtar Donetsk
- Seasons played: 35
- Top scorer: Luiz Adriano (32)
- First entry: 1976–77 UEFA Cup
- Latest entry: 2026–27 UEFA Champions League

Titles
- Europa League: 1: 2009

In European football, at continental level, FC Shakhtar Donetsk has participated since 1976, and until 1992 it represented the Soviet Union. Following the dissolution of the Soviet Union at the end of 1991, Shakhtar represents its native Ukraine. Originally based in Donetsk, since 2014 it has been forced to play its games in other Ukrainian cities (Kyiv, Kharkiv, Lviv) due to the Russian aggression against Ukraine.

Shakhtar Donetsk played its maiden game at continental competitions against Berliner FC Dynamo in the 1976–77 UEFA Cup. Since 1976, Shakhtar represented the Soviet football for only 5 seasons between 1976 and 1983. It returned to European competitions in 1994, representing Ukraine. Since 1997, however, the club has consistently participated on an annual basis, with variable successes, while also taking part in the UEFA Champions League competition since 2000. Shakhtar's first qualification to a group stage in a European competition took place in the 2000–01 UEFA Champions League, when Shakhtar Donetsk played against Arsenal, Lazio and Sparta Prague in Group B. While being a constant presence in Champions League group stages, Shakhtar have only reached UEFA Cup/UEFA Europa League group stages twice (2005–06 and 2009–10).

Until 2004, Shakhtar played its games at Shakhtar Stadium located near the Donetsk city center. Until Donbas Arena was built in 2009, Shakhtar played a few seasons at Olimpiyskyi Regional Sports Complex (former Lokomotyv), both located in the city's center.

In 2009, Shakhtar Donetsk won the UEFA Cup over Werder Bremen in the final held in Istanbul, becoming the first team in independent Ukraine to win a European trophy. In 2010–11, Shakhtar reached the quarter-finals of the Champions League, being eliminated by Barcelona; this was the first time the team qualified for the knockout phase in the Champions League. In 2015–16, despite a poor display in the Champions League group stages, Shakhtar was able to qualify to the Europa League knock-out phases by finishing third place in the group; Shakhtar reached the semi-finals after knocking out Schalke 04, Anderlecht and Braga, but were eventually knocked out by title defenders Sevilla.

== Record ==
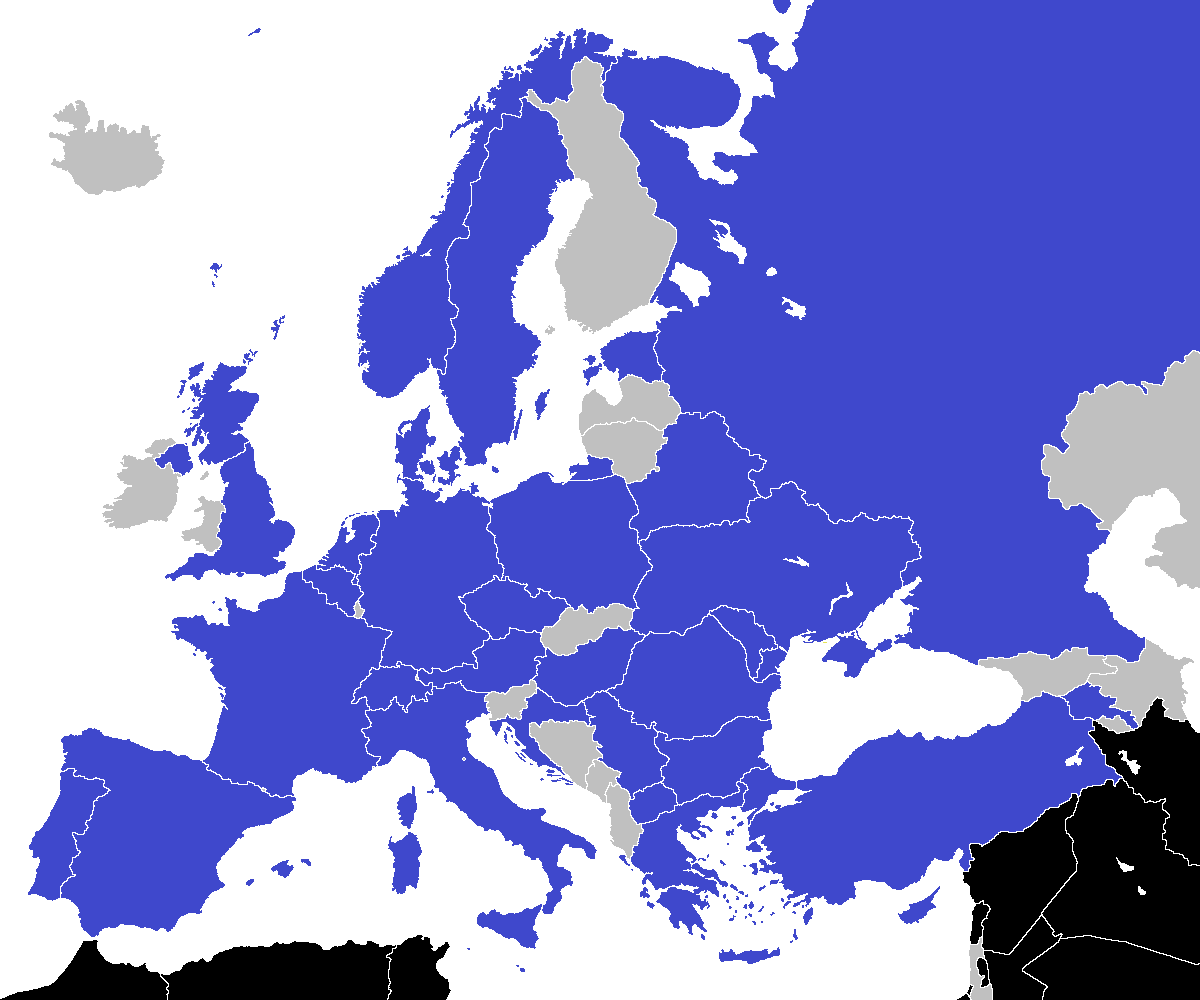
FC Shakhtar Donetsk opponents highlighted in blue as shown on the map.

=== Overall ===
As of match played 3 November 2026

| Country | Club | Pld | W | D | L | GF | GA | GD |
|---|---|---|---|---|---|---|---|---|
| Austria | Austria Wien | 2 | 1 | 0 | 1 | 2 | 5 | –3 |
| Austria | Rapid Wien | 2 | 1 | 1 | 0 | 3 | 2 | +1 |
| Austria | Red Bull Salzburg | 2 | 1 | 0 | 1 | 3 | 2 | +1 |
| Subtotal | | 6 | 3 | 1 | 2 | 8 | 9 | –1 |
| Armenia | Pyunik | 4 | 3 | 1 | 0 | 10 | 4 | +6 |
| Subtotal | | 4 | 3 | 1 | 0 | 10 | 4 | +6 |
| Belarus | Ataka Minsk | 1 | 0 | 0 | 1 | 1 | 2 | –1 |
| Belarus | BATE Borisov | 2 | 2 | 0 | 0 | 12 | 0 | +12 |
| Subtotal | | 3 | 2 | 0 | 1 | 13 | 2 | +11 |
| Belgium | Anderlecht | 2 | 2 | 0 | 0 | 4 | 1 | +3 |
| Belgium | Antwerp | 2 | 2 | 0 | 0 | 4 | 2 | +2 |
| Belgium | Club Brugge | 8 | 2 | 5 | 1 | 13 | 8 | +5 |
| Belgium | Genk | 2 | 2 | 0 | 0 | 4 | 2 | +2 |
| Belgium | Gent | 2 | 2 | 0 | 0 | 10 | 3 | +7 |
| Subtotal | | 16 | 10 | 5 | 1 | 35 | 16 | +19 |
| Bulgaria | CSKA Sofia | 2 | 1 | 0 | 1 | 2 | 4 | –2 |
| Subtotal | | 2 | 1 | 0 | 1 | 2 | 4 | –2 |
| Croatia | Dinamo Zagreb | 4 | 2 | 2 | 0 | 10 | 6 | +4 |
| Croatia | Rijeka | 1 | 0 | 1 | 0 | 0 | 0 | 0 |
| Subtotal | | 5 | 2 | 3 | 0 | 10 | 6 | +4 |
| Cyprus | APOEL | 2 | 1 | 1 | 0 | 3 | 1 | +2 |
| Subtotal | | 2 | 1 | 1 | 0 | 3 | 1 | +2 |
| Czech Republic | Slavia Prague | 2 | 1 | 1 | 0 | 2 | 1 | +1 |
| Czech Republic | Sparta Prague | 2 | 1 | 0 | 1 | 4 | 4 | 0 |
| Czech Republic | Viktoria Plzeň | 2 | 0 | 1 | 1 | 2 | 3 | –1 |
| Subtotal | | 6 | 2 | 1 | 2 | 8 | 8 | 0 |
| Denmark | B 1901 | 2 | 2 | 0 | 0 | 9 | 3 | +6 |
| Denmark | Nordsjælland | 2 | 2 | 0 | 0 | 7 | 2 | +5 |
| Subtotal | | 4 | 4 | 0 | 0 | 16 | 5 | +11 |
| England | Arsenal | 5 | 2 | 0 | 3 | 8 | 10 | –2 |
| England | Chelsea | 2 | 1 | 0 | 1 | 4 | 4 | 0 |
| England | Crystal Palace | 2 | 0 | 0 | 2 | 2 | 5 | –3 |
| England | Fulham | 2 | 0 | 1 | 1 | 2 | 3 | –1 |
| England | Manchester City | 6 | 1 | 1 | 4 | 3 | 16 | –13 |
| England | Manchester United | 2 | 0 | 1 | 1 | 1 | 2 | –1 |
| England | Tottenham Hotspur | 2 | 1 | 1 | 0 | 3 | 1 | +2 |
| Subtotal | | 21 | 5 | 4 | 12 | 23 | 41 | –18 |
| Estonia | Maardu | 2 | 2 | 0 | 0 | 9 | 1 | +8 |
| Subtotal | | 2 | 2 | 0 | 0 | 9 | 1 | +8 |
| Finland | Ilves | 2 | 1 | 1 | 0 | 6 | 0 | +6 |
| Subtotal | | 2 | 1 | 1 | 0 | 6 | 0 | +6 |
| France | Brest | 1 | 1 | 0 | 0 | 2 | 0 | +2 |
| France | Lille | 2 | 0 | 1 | 1 | 2 | 3 | –1 |
| France | Marseille | 4 | 2 | 1 | 1 | 7 | 6 | +1 |
| France | Monaco | 4 | 2 | 1 | 1 | 5 | 5 | 0 |
| France | Nancy | 2 | 1 | 1 | 0 | 2 | 1 | +1 |
| France | Rennes | 3 | 2 | 0 | 1 | 4 | 3 | +1 |
| France | Paris Saint-Germain | 2 | 0 | 0 | 2 | 0 | 5 | –5 |
| France | Toulouse | 2 | 2 | 0 | 0 | 6 | 0 | +6 |
| France | Lyon | 2 | 0 | 2 | 0 | 3 | 3 | 0 |
| Subtotal | | 22 | 10 | 6 | 6 | 31 | 26 | +5 |
| Germany / West Germany | Bayern Munich | 3 | 0 | 1 | 2 | 1 | 12 | –11 |
| Germany / West Germany | Bayer Leverkusen | 2 | 0 | 1 | 1 | 0 | 4 | –4 |
| Germany / West Germany | Berliner FC Dynamo | 2 | 1 | 1 | 0 | 4 | 1 | +3 |
| Germany / West Germany | Borussia Dortmund | 5 | 0 | 1 | 4 | 4 | 13 | –9 |
| Germany / West Germany | Borussia Mönchengladbach | 2 | 0 | 0 | 2 | 0 | 10 | –10 |
| Germany / West Germany | Eintracht Frankfurt | 4 | 1 | 1 | 2 | 4 | 9 | –5 |
| Germany / West Germany | TSG Hoffenheim | 2 | 1 | 1 | 0 | 5 | 4 | +1 |
| Germany / West Germany | RB Leipzig | 2 | 1 | 0 | 1 | 4 | 5 | –1 |
| Germany / West Germany | Schalke 04 | 4 | 2 | 2 | 0 | 5 | 1 | +4 |
| Germany / West Germany | VfB Stuttgart | 1 | 1 | 0 | 0 | 1 | 0 | +1 |
| Germany / West Germany | VfL Wolfsburg | 2 | 2 | 0 | 0 | 5 | 1 | +4 |
| Germany / West Germany | Werder Bremen | 1 | 1 | 0 | 0 | 2 | 1 | +1 |
| Subtotal | | 30 | 10 | 8 | 12 | 35 | 59 | –24 |
| Greece | AEK Athens | 1 | 1 | 0 | 0 | 3 | 1 | +2 |
| Greece | Olympiacos | 2 | 0 | 2 | 0 | 3 | 3 | 0 |
| Greece | Panathinaikos | 2 | 0 | 2 | 0 | 0 | 0 | 0 |
| Greece | PAOK | 1 | 1 | 0 | 0 | 1 | 0 | +1 |
| Subtotal | | 6 | 2 | 4 | 0 | 7 | 4 | +3 |
| Hungary | Budapest Honvéd | 2 | 2 | 0 | 0 | 6 | 2 | +4 |
| Hungary | Debrecen | 2 | 2 | 0 | 0 | 6 | 1 | +2 |
| Subtotal | | 4 | 4 | 0 | 0 | 12 | 3 | +9 |
| Iceland | Breiðablik | 1 | 1 | 0 | 0 | 2 | 0 | +2 |
| Subtotal | | 1 | 1 | 0 | 0 | 2 | 0 | +2 |
| Israel | Maccabi Tel Aviv | 2 | 2 | 0 | 0 | 3 | 0 | +3 |
| Subtotal | | 2 | 2 | 0 | 0 | 3 | 0 | +3 |
| Italy | Atalanta | 3 | 1 | 0 | 2 | 2 | 7 | –5 |
| Italy | Bologna | 1 | 0 | 1 | 0 | 0 | 0 | 0 |
| Italy | Internazionale | 8 | 0 | 4 | 4 | 1 | 11 | –10 |
| Italy | Juventus | 4 | 1 | 1 | 2 | 2 | 5 | –3 |
| Italy | Lazio | 2 | 0 | 0 | 2 | 1 | 8 | –7 |
| Italy | Milan | 4 | 0 | 0 | 4 | 1 | 12 | –11 |
| Italy | Napoli | 2 | 1 | 0 | 1 | 2 | 4 | –2 |
| Italy | Roma | 8 | 4 | 0 | 4 | 10 | 13 | −3 |
| Italy | Vicenza | 2 | 0 | 0 | 2 | 2 | 5 | –3 |
| Subtotal | | 34 | 7 | 6 | 21 | 21 | 65 | –44 |
| Malta | Birkirkara | 2 | 2 | 0 | 0 | 6 | 1 | +5 |
| Malta | Hamrun Spartans | 1 | 1 | 0 | 0 | 2 | 0 | +2 |
| Subtotal | | 3 | 3 | 0 | 0 | 8 | 1 | +7 |
| Moldova | Sheriff Tiraspol | 4 | 1 | 2 | 1 | 3 | 3 | 0 |
| Moldova | Zimbru Chișinău | 2 | 1 | 1 | 0 | 4 | 1 | +3 |
| Subtotal | | 6 | 2 | 3 | 1 | 7 | 4 | +3 |
| (North Macedonia) Macedonia | Sileks | 2 | 1 | 0 | 1 | 4 | 3 | +1 |
| Subtotal | | 2 | 1 | 0 | 1 | 4 | 3 | +1 |
| Netherlands | AZ | 4 | 1 | 1 | 2 | 7 | 7 | 0 |
| Netherlands | Feyenoord | 4 | 2 | 1 | 1 | 7 | 10 | –3 |
| Netherlands | PSV Eindhoven | 2 | 0 | 1 | 1 | 3 | 4 | –1 |
| Netherlands | Roda JC | 2 | 0 | 0 | 2 | 1 | 5 | –4 |
| Subtotal | | 12 | 3 | 3 | 6 | 18 | 26 | –8 |
| Northern Ireland | Linfield | 2 | 2 | 0 | 0 | 5 | 1 | +4 |
| Subtotal | | 2 | 2 | 0 | 0 | 5 | 1 | +4 |
| Norway | Lillestrøm | 2 | 1 | 0 | 1 | 3 | 4 | –1 |
| Subtotal | | 2 | 1 | 0 | 1 | 3 | 4 | –1 |
| Poland | Lech Poznań | 2 | 1 | 0 | 1 | 4 | 3 | +1 |
| Poland | Legia Warsaw | 3 | 2 | 0 | 1 | 5 | 4 | +1 |
| Subtotal | | 5 | 3 | 0 | 2 | 9 | 7 | +2 |
| Portugal | Boavista | 2 | 1 | 1 | 0 | 4 | 3 | +1 |
| Portugal | Benfica | 4 | 2 | 1 | 1 | 7 | 6 | +1 |
| Portugal | Braga | 6 | 6 | 0 | 0 | 17 | 3 | +14 |
| Portugal | Porto | 8 | 0 | 3 | 5 | 11 | 19 | –8 |
| Portugal | Sporting CP | 3 | 0 | 0 | 3 | 0 | 3 | –3 |
| Subtotal | | 23 | 9 | 5 | 9 | 39 | 34 | +5 |
| Republic of Ireland | Shamrock Rovers | 1 | 1 | 0 | 0 | 2 | 1 | +1 |
| Subtotal | | 1 | 1 | 0 | 0 | 2 | 1 | +1 |
| Romania | Dinamo București | 2 | 0 | 0 | 2 | 2 | 4 | –2 |
| Romania | Rapid București | 1 | 0 | 0 | 1 | 0 | 1 | –1 |
| Romania | Poli Timișoara | 2 | 0 | 2 | 0 | 2 | 2 | 0 |
| Subtotal | | 5 | 0 | 2 | 3 | 4 | 7 | –3 |
| Russia | CSKA Moscow | 2 | 1 | 0 | 1 | 2 | 1 | +1 |
| Russia | Lokomotiv Moscow | 2 | 1 | 0 | 1 | 2 | 3 | –1 |
| Russia | Rotor Volgograd | 1 | 0 | 0 | 1 | 1 | 4 | –3 |
| Russia | Zenit Saint Petersburg | 2 | 0 | 1 | 1 | 2 | 3 | –1 |
| Subtotal | | 7 | 2 | 1 | 4 | 7 | 11 | –4 |
| Scotland | Aberdeen | 1 | 1 | 0 | 0 | 3 | 2 | +1 |
| Scotland | Celtic | 6 | 2 | 2 | 2 | 8 | 6 | +2 |
| Subtotal | | 7 | 3 | 2 | 2 | 11 | 8 | +3 |
| Serbia | Partizan | 4 | 3 | 0 | 1 | 8 | 2 | +6 |
| Subtotal | | 4 | 3 | 0 | 1 | 8 | 2 | +6 |
| Spain | Athletic Bilbao | 2 | 0 | 1 | 1 | 0 | 1 | –1 |
| Spain | Celta Vigo | 4 | 1 | 1 | 2 | 1 | 3 | –2 |
| Spain | Barcelona | 10 | 3 | 1 | 6 | 10 | 19 | –9 |
| Spain | Real Sociedad | 2 | 2 | 0 | 0 | 6 | 0 | +6 |
| Spain | Real Madrid | 8 | 2 | 1 | 5 | 11 | 20 | –9 |
| Spain | Sevilla | 4 | 0 | 2 | 2 | 7 | 10 | –3 |
| Spain | Valencia | 2 | 0 | 1 | 1 | 2 | 4 | –2 |
| Subtotal | | 32 | 8 | 6 | 18 | 36 | 57 | –21 |
| Sweden | Malmö FF | 2 | 1 | 0 | 1 | 4 | 1 | +3 |
| Subtotal | | 2 | 1 | 0 | 1 | 4 | 1 | +3 |
| Switzerland | Basel | 4 | 3 | 1 | 0 | 13 | 4 | +9 |
| Switzerland | Lugano | 2 | 1 | 0 | 1 | 4 | 2 | +2 |
| Switzerland | Servette | 4 | 3 | 1 | 0 | 6 | 3 | +3 |
| Switzerland | Young Boys | 3 | 2 | 0 | 1 | 4 | 3 | +1 |
| Switzerland | Zürich | 2 | 1 | 0 | 1 | 3 | 6 | -3 |
| Subtotal | | 15 | 10 | 2 | 3 | 30 | 18 | +12 |
| Turkey | Antalyaspor | 1 | 1 | 0 | 0 | 1 | 0 | +1 |
| Turkey | Beşiktaş | 2 | 2 | 0 | 0 | 6 | 2 | +4 |
| Turkey | Fenerbahçe | 2 | 1 | 1 | 0 | 3 | 0 | +3 |
| Turkey | İstanbul Başakşehir | 2 | 2 | 0 | 0 | 4 | 1 | +3 |
| Turkey | Konyaspor | 2 | 2 | 0 | 0 | 5 | 0 | +5 |
| Turkey | Sivasspor | 2 | 2 | 0 | 0 | 5 | 0 | +5 |
| Subtotal | | 11 | 10 | 1 | 0 | 24 | 3 | +21 |
| Ukraine | Dynamo Kyiv | 2 | 1 | 1 | 0 | 3 | 2 | +1 |
| Subtotal | | 2 | 1 | 1 | 0 | 3 | 2 | +1 |

=== By competition ===
As of match played 3 November 2026

| Tournament | Pld | W | D | L | GF | GA | GD | WIN% |
|---|---|---|---|---|---|---|---|---|
| Champions League | 170 | 64 | 38 | 68 | 236 | 263 | −27 | 0.38 |
| UEFA Cup/Europa League | 107 | 56 | 20 | 31 | 179 | 133 | +46 | 0.52 |
| Cup Winners' Cup | 18 | 8 | 5 | 5 | 32 | 24 | +8 | 0.44 |
| Intertoto Cup | 4 | 1 | 1 | 2 | 5 | 8 | −3 | 0.25 |
| Conference League | 14 | 7 | 3 | 4 | 24 | 17 | +9 | 0.5 |
| Super Cup | 1 | 0 | 0 | 1 | 0 | 1 | −1 | 0 |
| Total | 314 | 136 | 67 | 111 | 476 | 446 | +30 | 0.43 |

== Matches ==
As of match played 3 November 2026

| Season | Competition | Round | Opponent | Home | Away | Aggregate | |
|---|---|---|---|---|---|---|---|
| 1976–77 | UEFA Cup | First round | (East Germany) Berliner FC Dynamo | 3–0 | 1–1 | 4–1 | |
| 1976–77 | UEFA Cup | Second round | (Hungary) Budapest Honvéd | 3–0 | 3–2 | 6–2 | |
| 1976–77 | UEFA Cup | Third round | (Italy) Juventus | 1–0 | 0–3 | 1–3 | |
| 1978–79 | Cup Winners' Cup | First round | (Spain) Barcelona | 1–1 | 0–3 | 1–4 | |
| 1979–80 | UEFA Cup | First round | (France) Monaco | 2–1 | 0–2 | 2–3 | |
| 1980–81 | UEFA Cup | First round | (West Germany) Eintracht Frankfurt | 1–0 | 0–3 | 1–3 | |
| 1983–84 | Cup Winners' Cup | First round | (Denmark) B 1901 | 4–2 | 5–1 | 9–3 | |
| 1983–84 | Cup Winners' Cup | Second round | (Switzerland) Servette | 1–0 | 2–1 | 3–1 | |
| 1983–84 | Cup Winners' Cup | Quarter-finals | (Portugal) Porto | 1–1 | 2–3 | 3–4 | |
| 1994–95 | UEFA Cup | Preliminary round | (Norway) Lillestrøm | 2–0 | 1–4 | 3–4 | |
| 1995–96 | Cup Winners' Cup | Qualifying round | (Northern Ireland) Linfield | 4–1 | 1–0 | 5–1 | |
| 1995–96 | Cup Winners' Cup | First round | (Belgium) Club Brugge | 1–1 | 0–1 | 1–2 | |
| 1996 | Intertoto Cup | Group 7 | (Switzerland) Basel | —N/a | 2–2 | 4th of 5 | |
| 1996 | Intertoto Cup | Group 7 | (Belarus) Ataka-Aura Minsk | 1–2 | —N/a | 4th of 5 | |
| 1996 | Intertoto Cup | Group 7 | (Russia) Rotor Volgograd | —N/a | 1–4 | 4th of 5 | |
| 1996 | Intertoto Cup | Group 7 | (Turkey) Antalyaspor | 1–0 | —N/a | 4th of 5 | |
| 1997–98 | Cup Winners' Cup | Qualifying round | (Moldova) Zimbru Chișinău | 3–0 | 1–1 | 4–1 | |
| 1997–98 | Cup Winners' Cup | First round | (Portugal) Boavista | 1–1 | 3–2 | 4–3 | |
| 1997–98 | Cup Winners' Cup | Second round | (Italy) Vicenza | 1–3 | 1–2 | 2–5 | |
| 1998–99 | UEFA Cup | First qualifying round | (Malta) Birkirkara | 2–1 | 4–0 | 6–1 | |
| 1998–99 | UEFA Cup | Second qualifying round | (Switzerland) Zürich | 3–2 | 0–4 | 3–6 | |
| 1999–00 | UEFA Cup | Qualifying round | (North Macedonia) Sileks | 3–1 | 1–2 | 4–3 | |
| 1999–00 | UEFA Cup | First round | (Netherlands) Roda JC | 1–3 | 0–2 | 1–5 | |
| 2000–01 | Champions League | Second qualifying round | (Estonia) Maardu | 4–1 | 5–1 | 9–2 | |
| 2000–01 | Champions League | Third qualifying round | (Czech Republic) Slavia Prague | 0–1 | 2–0 | 2–1 | |
| 2000–01 | Champions League | Group B | (England) Arsenal | 3–0 | 2–3 | 3rd | |
| 2000–01 | Champions League | Group B | (Italy) Lazio | 0–3 | 1–5 | 3rd | |
| 2000–01 | Champions League | Group B | (Czech Republic) Sparta Prague | 2–1 | 2–3 | 3rd | |
| 2000–01 | UEFA Cup | Third round | (Spain) Celta Vigo | 0–0 | 0–1 | 0–1 | |
| 2001–02 | Champions League | Second qualifying round | (Switzerland) Lugano | 3–0 | 1–2 | 4–2 | |
| 2001–02 | Champions League | Third qualifying round | (Germany) Borussia Dortmund | 0–2 | 1–3 | 1–5 | |
| 2001–02 | UEFA Cup | First round | (Bulgaria) CSKA Sofia | 2–1 | 0–3 | 2–4 | |
| 2002–03 | Champions League | Third qualifying round | (Belgium) Club Brugge | 1–1 | 1–1 (a.e.t.) | 2–2 (1–4 p) | |
| 2002–03 | UEFA Cup | First round | Austria Wien | 1–0 | 1–5 | 2–5 | |
| 2003–04 | Champions League | Second qualifying round | (Moldova) Sheriff Tiraspol | 2–0 | 0–0 | 2–0 | |
| 2003–04 | Champions League | Third qualifying round | (Russia) Lokomotiv Moscow | 1–0 | 1–3 | 2–3 | |
| 2003–04 | UEFA Cup | First round | (Romania) Dinamo București | 2–3 | 0–2 | 2–5 | |
| 2004–05 | Champions League | Second qualifying round | (Armenia) Pyunik | 4–1 | 2–2 | 6–3 | |
| 2004–05 | Champions League | Third qualifying round | (Belgium) Club Brugge | 4–1 | 2–2 | 6–3 | |
| 2004–05 | Champions League | Group F | (Italy) Milan | 0–1 | 0–4 | 3rd (Transfer to UC) | |
| 2004–05 | Champions League | Group F | (Spain) Barcelona | 2–0 | 0–3 | 3rd (Transfer to UC) | |
| 2004–05 | Champions League | Group F | (Scotland) Celtic | 3–0 | 0–1 | 3rd (Transfer to UC) | |
| 2004–05 | UEFA Cup | Round of 32 | (Germany) Schalke 04 | 1–1 | 1–0 | 2–1 | |
| 2004–05 | UEFA Cup | Round of 16 | (Netherlands) AZ | 1–3 | 1–2 | 2–5 | |
| 2005–06 | Champions League | Third qualifying round | (Italy) Internazionale | 0–2 | 1–1 | 1–3 | |
| 2005–06 | UEFA Cup | First round | (Hungary) Debrecen | 4–1 | 2–0 | 6–1 | |
| 2005–06 | UEFA Cup | Group G | (Romania) Rapid București | 0–1 | —N/a | 2nd | |
| 2005–06 | UEFA Cup | Group G | (Germany) VfB Stuttgart | —N/a | 2–0 | 2nd | |
| 2005–06 | UEFA Cup | Group G | (Greece) PAOK | 1–0 | —N/a | 2nd | |
| 2005–06 | UEFA Cup | Group G | (France) Rennes | —N/a | 1–0 | 2nd | |
| 2005–06 | UEFA Cup | Round of 32 | (France) Lille | 0–0 | 2–3 | 2–3 | |
| 2006–07 | Champions League | Third qualifying round | (Poland) Legia Warsaw | 1–0 | 3–2 | 4–2 | |
| 2006–07 | Champions League | Group D | (Spain) Valencia | 2–2 | 0–2 | 3rd (Transfer to UC) | |
| 2006–07 | Champions League | Group D | (Italy) Roma | 1–0 | 0–4 | 3rd (Transfer to UC) | |
| 2006–07 | Champions League | Group D | (Greece) Olympiacos | 2–2 | 1–1 | 3rd (Transfer to UC) | |
| 2006–07 | UEFA Cup | Round of 32 | (France) Nancy | 1–1 | 1–0 | 2–1 | |
| 2006–07 | UEFA Cup | Round of 16 | (Spain) Sevilla | 2–3 | 2–2 | 4–5 | |
| 2007–08 | Champions League | Second qualifying round | (Armenia) Pyunik | 2–0 | 2–1 | 4–1 | |
| 2007–08 | Champions League | Third qualifying round | (Austria) Red Bull Salzburg | 3–1 | 0–1 | 3–2 | |
| 2007–08 | Champions League | Group D | (Italy) Milan | 0–3 | 1–4 | 4th | |
| 2007–08 | Champions League | Group D | (Scotland) Celtic | 2–0 | 1–2 | 4th | |
| 2007–08 | Champions League | Group D | (Portugal) Benfica | 1–2 | 1–0 | 4th | |
| 2008–09 | Champions League | Third qualifying round | (Croatia) Dinamo Zagreb | 2–0 | 3–1 | 5–1 | |
| 2008–09 | Champions League | Group C | (Spain) Barcelona | 1–2 | 3–2 | 3rd (Transfer to UC) | |
| 2008–09 | Champions League | Group C | (Portugal) Sporting | 0–1 | 0–1 | 3rd (Transfer to UC) | |
| 2008–09 | Champions League | Group C | (Switzerland) Basel | 5–0 | 2–1 | 3rd (Transfer to UC) | |
| 2008–09 | UEFA Cup | Round of 32 | (England) Tottenham Hotspur | 2–0 | 1–1 | 3–1 | |
| 2008–09 | UEFA Cup | Round of 16 | (Russia) CSKA Moscow | 2–0 | 0–1 | 2–1 | |
| 2008–09 | UEFA Cup | Quarter-finals | (France) Marseille | 2–0 | 2–1 | 4–1 | |
| 2008–09 | UEFA Cup | Semi-finals | (Ukraine) Dynamo Kyiv | 2–1 | 1–1 | 3–2 | |
| 2008–09 | UEFA Cup | Final | (Germany) Werder Bremen | 2–1 (N) | | | |
| 2009–10 | Champions League | Third qualifying round | (Romania) Timișoara | 2–2 | 0–0 | 2–2 (a) | |
| 2009–10 | UEFA Super Cup | Final | (Spain) Barcelona | 0-1 | | | |
| 2009–10 | Europa League | Play-off | (Turkey) Sivasspor | 2–0 | 3–0 | 5–0 | |
| 2009–10 | Europa League | Group J | (Belgium) Club Brugge | 0–0 | 4–1 | 1st | |
| 2009–10 | Europa League | Group J | (France) Toulouse | 4–0 | 2–0 | 1st | |
| 2009–10 | Europa League | Group J | (Serbia) Partizan | 4–1 | 0–1 | 1st | |
| 2009–10 | Europa League | Round of 32 | (England) Fulham | 1–1 | 1–2 | 2–3 | |
| 2010–11 | Champions League | Group H | (England) Arsenal | 2–1 | 1–5 | 1st | |
| 2010–11 | Champions League | Group H | (Portugal) Braga | 2–1 | 3–1 | 1st | |
| 2010–11 | Champions League | Group H | (Serbia) Partizan | 1–0 | 3–0 | 1st | |
| 2010–11 | Champions League | Round of 16 | (Italy) Roma | 3–0 | 3–2 | 6–2 | |
| 2010–11 | Champions League | Quarter-final | (Spain) Barcelona | 0–1 | 1–5 | 1–6 | |
| 2011–12 | Champions League | Group G | (Portugal) Porto | 0–2 | 1–2 | 4th | |
| 2011–12 | Champions League | Group G | (Russia) Zenit Saint Petersburg | 2–2 | 0–1 | 4th | |
| 2011–12 | Champions League | Group G | (Cyprus) APOEL | 1–1 | 2–0 | 4th | |
| 2012–13 | Champions League | Group E | (Italy) Juventus | 0–1 | 1–1 | 2nd | |
| 2012–13 | Champions League | Group E | (England) Chelsea | 2–1 | 2–3 | 2nd | |
| 2012–13 | Champions League | Group E | (Denmark) Nordsjælland | 2–0 | 5–2 | 2nd | |
| 2012–13 | Champions League | Round of 16 | (Germany) Borussia Dortmund | 2–2 | 0–3 | 2–5 | |
| 2013–14 | Champions League | Group A | (England) Manchester United | 1–1 | 0–2 | 3rd | |
| 2013–14 | Champions League | Group A | (Germany) Bayer Leverkusen | 0–0 | 0–4 | 3rd | |
| 2013–14 | Champions League | Group A | (Spain) Real Sociedad | 4–0 | 2–0 | 3rd | |
| 2013–14 | Europa League | Round of 32 | (Czech Republic) Viktoria Plzeň | 1–2 | 1–1 | 2–3 | |
| 2014–15 | Champions League | Group H | (Portugal) Porto | 2–2 | 1–1 | 2nd | |
| 2014–15 | Champions League | Group H | (Spain) Athletic Bilbao | 0–1 | 0–0 | 2nd | |
| 2014–15 | Champions League | Group H | (Belarus) BATE Borisov | 5–0 | 7–0 | 2nd | |
| 2014–15 | Champions League | Round of 16 | (Germany) Bayern Munich | 0–0 | 0–7 | 0–7 | |
| 2015–16 | Champions League | Third qualifying round | (Turkey) Fenerbahçe | 3–0 | 0–0 | 3–0 | |
| 2015–16 | Champions League | Play-off | (Austria) Rapid Wien | 2–2 | 1–0 | 3–1 | |
| 2015–16 | Champions League | Group A | (Spain) Real Madrid | 3–4 | 0–4 | 3rd | |
| 2015–16 | Champions League | Group A | (France) Paris Saint-Germain | 0–3 | 0–2 | 3rd | |
| 2015–16 | Champions League | Group A | (Sweden) Malmö FF | 4–0 | 0–1 | 3rd | |
| 2015–16 | Europa League | Round of 32 | (Germany) Schalke 04 | 0–0 | 3–0 | 3–0 | |
| 2015–16 | Europa League | Round of 16 | (Belgium) Anderlecht | 3–1 | 1–0 | 4–1 | |
| 2015–16 | Europa League | Quarter-finals | (Portugal) Braga | 4–0 | 2–1 | 6–1 | |
| 2015–16 | Europa League | Semi-finals | (Spain) Sevilla | 2–2 | 1–3 | 3–5 | |
| 2016–17 | Champions League | Third qualifying round | (Switzerland) Young Boys | 2–0 | 0–2 (a.e.t.) | 2–2 (2–4 p) | |
| 2016–17 | Europa League | Play-off | (Turkey) İstanbul Başakşehir | 2–0 | 2–1 | 4–1 | |
| 2016–17 | Europa League | Group H | (Belgium) Gent | 5–0 | 5–3 | 1st | |
| 2016–17 | Europa League | Group H | (Portugal) Braga | 2–0 | 4–2 | 1st | |
| 2016–17 | Europa League | Group H | (Turkey) Konyaspor | 4–0 | 1–0 | 1st | |
| 2016–17 | Europa League | Round of 32 | (Spain) Celta Vigo | 0–2 (a.e.t.) | 1–0 | 1–2 | |
| 2017–18 | Champions League | Group F | (England) Manchester City | 2–1 | 0–2 | 2nd | |
| 2017–18 | Champions League | Group F | (Italy) Napoli | 2–1 | 0–3 | 2nd | |
| 2017–18 | Champions League | Group F | (Netherlands) Feyenoord | 3–1 | 2–1 | 2nd | |
| 2017–18 | Champions League | Round of 16 | (Italy) Roma | 2–1 | 0–1 | 2–2 (a) | |
| 2018–19 | Champions League | Group F | (England) Manchester City | 0–3 | 0–6 | 3rd | |
| 2018–19 | Champions League | Group F | (France) Lyon | 1–1 | 2–2 | 3rd | |
| 2018–19 | Champions League | Group F | (Germany) TSG Hoffenheim | 2–2 | 3–2 | 3rd | |
| 2018–19 | Europa League | Round of 32 | (Germany) Eintracht Frankfurt | 2–2 | 1–4 | 3–6 | |
| 2019–20 | Champions League | Group C | (England) Manchester City | 0–3 | 1–1 | 3rd | |
| 2019–20 | Champions League | Group C | (Croatia) Dinamo Zagreb | 2–2 | 3–3 | 3rd | |
| 2019–20 | Champions League | Group C | (Italy) Atalanta | 0–3 | 2–1 | 3rd | |
| 2019–20 | Europa League | Round of 32 | (Portugal) Benfica | 2–1 | 3–3 | 5–4 | |
| 2019–20 | Europa League | Round of 16 | (Germany) VfL Wolfsburg | 3–0 | 2–1 | 5–1 | |
| 2019–20 | Europa League | Quarter-finals | (Switzerland) Basel | 4–1 (N) | | | |
| 2019–20 | Europa League | Semi-finals | (Italy) Internazionale | 0–5 (N) | | | |
| 2020–21 | Champions League | Group B | (Spain) Real Madrid | 2–0 | 3–2 | 3rd | |
| 2020–21 | Champions League | Group B | (Italy) Internazionale | 0–0 | 0–0 | 3rd | |
| 2020–21 | Champions League | Group B | (Germany) Borussia Mönchengladbach | 0–6 | 0–4 | 3rd | |
| 2020–21 | Europa League | Round of 32 | (Israel) Maccabi Tel Aviv | 1–0 | 2–0 | 3–0 | |
| 2020–21 | Europa League | Round of 16 | (Italy) Roma | 1–2 | 0–3 | 1–5 | |
| 2021–22 | Champions League | Third qualifying round | (Belgium) Genk | 2–1 | 2–1 | 4−2 | |
| 2021–22 | Champions League | Play-off round | (France) Monaco | 2–2 (a.e.t.) | 1–0 | 3−2 | |
| 2021–22 | Champions League | Group D | (Moldova) Sheriff Tiraspol | 1–1 | 0–2 | 4th | |
| 2021–22 | Champions League | Group D | (Italy) Internazionale | 0–0 | 0–2 | 4th | |
| 2021–22 | Champions League | Group D | (Spain) Real Madrid | 0–5 | 1–2 | 4th | |
| 2022–23 | Champions League | Group F | (Germany) RB Leipzig | 0–4 W | 4−1 | 3rd | |
| 2022–23 | Champions League | Group F | (Scotland) Celtic | 1–1 W | 1–1 | 3rd | |
| 2022–23 | Champions League | Group F | (Spain) Real Madrid | 1–1 W | 1–2 | 3rd | |
| 2022–23 | Europa League | Knockout round play-off | (France) Rennes | 2−1 W | 1–2 (a.e.t.) | 3–3 (5–4 p) | |
| 2022–23 | Europa League | Round of 16 | (Netherlands) Feyenoord | 1–1 W | 1–7 | 2–8 | |
| 2023–24 | Champions League | Group H | (Portugal) Porto | 1–3 H | 3–5 | 3rd | |
| 2023–24 | Champions League | Group H | (Belgium) Antwerp | 1−0 H | 3−2 | 3rd | |
| 2023–24 | Champions League | Group H | (Spain) Barcelona | 1−0 H | 1–2 | 3rd | |
| 2023–24 | Europa League | Knockout round play-off | (France) Marseille | 2–2 H | 1–3 | 3–5 | |
| 2024–25 | Champions League | League phase | (Italy) Bologna | —N/a | 0–0 | 27th of 36 | |
| 2024–25 | Champions League | League phase | (Italy) Atalanta | 0–3 G | —N/a | 27th of 36 | |
| 2024–25 | Champions League | League phase | (England) Arsenal | —N/a | 0–1 | 27th of 36 | |
| 2024–25 | Champions League | League phase | (Switzerland) Young Boys | 2–1 G | —N/a | 27th of 36 | |
| 2024–25 | Champions League | League phase | (Netherlands) PSV Eindhoven | —N/a | 2–3 | 27th of 36 | |
| 2024–25 | Champions League | League phase | (Germany) Bayern Munich | 1–5 G | —N/a | 27th of 36 | |
| 2024–25 | Champions League | League phase | (France) Brest | 2–0 G | —N/a | 27th of 36 | |
| 2024–25 | Champions League | League phase | (Germany) Borussia Dortmund | —N/a | 1–3 | 27th of 36 | |
| 2025−26 | Europa League | First qualifying round | (Finland) Ilves | 6–0 Lb | 0–0 | 6–0 | |
| 2025−26 | Europa League | Second qualifying round | (Turkey) Beşiktaş | 4–2 K | 2–0 | 6–2 | |
| 2025−26 | Europa League | Third qualifying round | (Greece) Panathinaikos | 0–0 (a.e.t.) K | 0–0 | 0–0 (3–4 p) | |
| 2025−26 | Conference League | Play-off round | (Switzerland) Servette | 1–1 K | 2–1 (a.e.t.) | 3–2 | |
| 2025−26 | Conference League | League phase | (Scotland) Aberdeen | —N/a | 3–2 | 6th of 36 | |
| 2025−26 | Conference League | League phase | (Poland) Legia Warsaw | 1–2 K | —N/a | 6th of 36 | |
| 2025−26 | Conference League | League phase | (Iceland) Breiðablik | 2–0 K | —N/a | 6th of 36 | |
| 2025−26 | Conference League | League phase | (Republic of Ireland) Shamrock Rovers | —N/a | 2–1 | 6th of 36 | |
| 2025−26 | Conference League | League phase | (Malta) Hamrun Spartans | —N/a | 2–0 | 6th of 36 | |
| 2025−26 | Conference League | League phase | (Croatia) Rijeka | 0–0 K | —N/a | 6th of 36 | |
| 2025−26 | Conference League | Round of 16 | (Poland) Lech Poznań | 1–2 K | 3–1 | 4–3 | |
| 2025−26 | Conference League | Quarter-finals | (Netherlands) AZ | 3–0 K | 2–2 | 5–2 | |
| 2025−26 | Conference League | Semi-finals | (England) Crystal Palace | 1–3 K | 1–2 | 2–5 | |
| 2026–27 | Champions League | League phase | (Netherlands) PSV Eindhoven | —N/a | 1–1 | TBD | TBD |
| 2026–27 | Champions League | League phase | (Greece) AEK Athens | 3–1 L | —N/a | TBD | TBD |
| 2026–27 | Champions League | League phase | (Italy) Internazionale | —N/a | 0–1 | TBD | TBD |
| 2026–27 | Champions League | League phase | (Portugal) Sporting CP | 0–1 L | —N/a | TBD | TBD |
| 2026–27 | Champions League | League phase | (Turkey) Fenerbahçe | | —N/a | TBD | TBD |
| 2026–27 | Champions League | League phase | (Slovakia) Slovan Bratislava | —N/a | | TBD | TBD |
| 2026–27 | Champions League | League phase | (Germany) RB Leipzig | —N/a | | TBD | TBD |
| 2026–27 | Champions League | League phase | (Spain) Real Madrid | | —N/a | TBD | TBD |

Note: Home until 2021/ Neutral: W - Warsaw, Poland; H - Hamburg, Germany; G - Gelsenkirchen, Germany; Lb - Ljubljana, Slovenia; K - Kraków, Poland; L - London, England, GB.

== UEFA coefficient rankings ==
=== UEFA club coefficient ranking ===
As of 31 December 2025

| Rank | Team | Points |
|---|---|---|
| 43 | (France) Marseille | 54.000 |
| 44 | (France) Lyon | 53.750 |
| 45 | (Denmark) Copenhagen | 53.375 |
| 46 | (Ukraine) Shakhtar Donetsk | 49.750 |
| 47 | (Turkey) Galatasaray | 47.750 |
| 48 | (Belgium) Union SG | 46.000 |
| 49 | (Portugal) Braga | 46.000 |

=== UEFA Rankings since 2004 ===
As of 31 December 2025

| Season | Ranking | Movement | Points | Change |
|---|---|---|---|---|
| 2025–26 | 46 | ▼ -5 | 49.750 | ▼ -2.250 |
| 2024–25 | 41 | ▼ -14 | 52.000 | ▼ -11.000 |
| 2023–24 | 27 | ▼ -2 | 63.000 | 0.000 |
| 2022–23 | 25 | ▼ -3 | 63.000 | ▼ -8.000 |
| 2021–22 | 22 | ▼ -4 | 71.000 | ▼ -8.000 |
| 2020–21 | 18 | ▼ -6 | 79.000 | ▼ -6.000 |
| 2019–20 | 12 | ▲ +4 | 85.000 | ▲ +5.000 |
| 2018–19 | 16 | ▼ -2 | 80.000 | ▼ -1.000 |
| 2017–18 | 14 | ▲ +4 | 81.000 | ▲ +2.000 |
| 2016–17 | 18 | ▲ +3 | 79.000 | ▲ +6.000 |
| 2015–16 | 21 | ▼ -3 | 73.000 | ▼ -4.000 |
| 2014–15 | 18 | 0 | 77.000 | ▲ +7.000 |
| 2013–14 | 18 | ▼ -5 | 70.000 | ▼ -15.000 |
| 2012–13 | 13 | ▲ +3 | 85.000 | ▲ +10.000 |
| 2011–12 | 16 | ▼ -2 | 75.000 | ▼ -4.000 |
| 2010–11 | 14 | ▲ +2 | 79.000 | ▲ +13.000 |
| 2009–10 | 16 | 0 | 66.000 | 0.000 |
| 2008–09 | 16 | ▲ +30 | 66.000 | ▲ +26.000 |
| 2007–08 | 46 | ▲ +3 | 40.000 | ▲ +5.000 |
| 2006–07 | 49 | ▲ +20 | 35.000 | ▲ +10.000 |
| 2005–06 | 69 | ▲ +11 | 25.000 | ▲ +5.000 |
| 2004–05 | 80 | 0 | 20.000 | 0.000 |

=== Football Club Elo ranking ===
As of 31 December 2025

| Rank | Team | Points |
|---|---|---|
| 139 | (Germany) Elversberg | 1549 |
| 140 | (Azerbaijan) Qarabağ | 1546 |
| 141 | (England) Southampton | 1545 |
| 142 | (Ukraine) Shakhtar Donetsk | 1544 |
| 143 | (Netherlands) Twente | 1544 |
| 144 | (Portugal) Famalicão | 1544 |
| 145 | (Spain) Almería | 1544 |

== Player statistics ==
The first goal for Shakhtar at European competitions was scored by a native of Kherson Volodymyr Rohovsky when Shakhtar defeated Berliner Dynamo 3:0 at Central Stadium "Shakhtar" in 1976.

=== Goalscorers ===
As of match played 3 November 2026

| Rank | Player | Years | UEFA Cup | Cup Winners' Cup | Intertoto Cup | Super Cup | Europa League | Champions League | Conference League | Total | Ratio |
|---|---|---|---|---|---|---|---|---|---|---|---|
| 1 | (Brazil) Luiz Adriano | 2007–2015 | 3 (8) | (-) | (-) | 0 (1) | 8 (11) | 21 (45) | (-) | 32 (64) | 0.5 |
| 2 | (Brazil) Jádson | 2005–2011 | 4 (20) | (-) | (-) | 0 (1) | 3 (10) | 10 (42) | (-) | 17 (73) | 0.23 |
| 3 | (Brazil) Brandão | 2002–2009 | 6 (15) | (-) | (-) | (-) | (-) | 9 (38) | (-) | 15 (53) | 0.28 |
| 4 | (Brazil) Fernandinho | 2005–2013 | 6 (20) | (-) | (-) | 0 (1) | 1 (10) | 6 (41) | (-) | 13 (71) | 0.18 |
| 5 | (Ukraine) Serhiy Atelkin | 1989–1997, 2000–2002 | 0 (3) | 6 (6) | (-) | (-) | (-) | 6 (13) | (-) | 12 (22) | 0.55 |
| 5 | (Ukraine) Andriy Vorobey | 1995–2007 | 2 (20) | 0 (1) | 0 (0) | (-) | 0 (0) | 10 (33) | (-) | 12 (54) | 0.22 |
| 5 | (Brazil) Alex Teixeira | 2010–2016 | 0 (2) | (-) | (-) | (-) | (-) | 12 (45) | (-) | 12 (47) | 0.26 |
| 5 | (Brazil) Júnior Moraes | 2018–2022 | (-) | (-) | (-) | (-) | 7 (12) | 5 (15) | (-) | 12 (27) | 0.44 |
| 9 | (Brazil) Taison | 2013–2021 | (-) | (-) | (-) | (-) | 7 (23) | 4 (57) | (-) | 11 (80) | 0.14 |
| 9 | Own goal | | 0 (53) | 1 (18) | 0 (4) | (-) | 7 (54) | 4 (167) | 0 (14) | 11 (311) | 0.04 |
| 11 | (Nigeria) Julius Aghahowa | 2000–2007, 2009–2012 | 3 (13) | (-) | (-) | 0 (1) | 0 (3) | 7 (27) | (-) | 10 (43) | 0.23 |
| 11 | (Brazil) Marlos | 2014–2021 | (-) | (-) | (-) | (-) | 5 (28) | 5 (50) | (-) | 10 (78) | 0.13 |
| 13 | (Croatia) Darijo Srna | 2003–2018 | 1 (25) | (-) | (-) | 0 (1) | 2 (25) | 6 (86) | (-) | 9 (136) | 0.07 |
| 13 | (Romania) Ciprian Marica | 2004–2007 | 2 (10) | (-) | (-) | (-) | (-) | 7 (19) | (-) | 9 (29) | 0.31 |
| 13 | (Brazil) Willian | 2007–2013 | 0 (9) | (-) | (-) | 0 (1) | 1 (10) | 8 (34) | (-) | 9 (53) | 0.17 |
| 13 | (Croatia) Eduardo | 2010–2014, 2015–2016 | (-) | (-) | (-) | (-) | 4 (14) | 5 (26) | (-) | 9 (40) | 0.23 |
| 17 | (Ukraine) Oleksandr Hladkyi | 2007–2010, 2014–2016 | 0 (11) | (-) | (-) | (-) | 0 (1) | 8 (26) | (-) | 8 (0) | 0.21 |
| 17 | (Argentina) Facundo Ferreyra | 2013–2018 | (-) | (-) | (-) | (-) | 5 (15) | 3 (14) | (-) | 8 (29) | 0.28 |
| 19 | (Brazil) Elano | 2005–2007 | 5 (15) | (-) | (-) | (-) | (-) | 2 (8) | (-) | 7 (23) | 0.3 |
| 19 | (Brazil) Matuzalém | 2004–2007 | 3 (16) | (-) | (-) | (-) | (-) | 4 (17) | (-) | 7 (33) | 0.21 |
| 19 | (Brazil) Kevin | 2024–2025 | (-) | (-) | (-) | (-) | 4 (4) | 2 (7) | 1 (2) | 7 (13) | 0.54 |
| 22 | (Soviet Union) Mykhaylo Sokolovskyi | 1974–1987 | 4 (10) | 2 (8) | (-) | (-) | (-) | (-) | (-) | 6 (18) | 0.33 |
| 22 | (Ukraine) Hennadiy Orbu | 1993–1996, 1997–2000 | 3 (9) | 3 (10) | (-) | (-) | (-) | (-) | (-) | 6 (19) | 0.32 |
| 22 | (Ukraine) Hennadiy Zubov | 1994–2004 | 1 (13) | 2 (7) | 0 (4) | (-) | (-) | 3 (16) | (-) | 6 (40) | 0.15 |
| 22 | (Ukraine) Taras Stepanenko | 2010–2025 | (-) | (-) | (-) | (-) | 4 (29) | 2 (76) | (-) | 6 (105) | 0.06 |
| 22 | (Brazil) Douglas Costa | 2010–2015 | (-) | (-) | (-) | (-) | 0 (4) | 6 (34) | (-) | 6 (38) | 0.16 |
| 22 | (Brazil) Bernard | 2013–2018 | (-) | (-) | (-) | (-) | 2 (15) | 4 (28) | (-) | 6 (43) | 0.14 |
| 22 | (Ukraine) Viktor Kovalenko | 2014–2021 | 0 (0) | 0 (0) | 0 (0) | (-) | 6 (22) | 0 (26) | (-) | 6 (48) | 0.13 |
| 22 | (Brazil) Alan Patrick | 2011–2022 | (-) | (-) | (-) | (-) | 4 (12) | 2 (27) | (-) | 6 (39) | 0.15 |
| 22 | (Brazil) Alisson Santana | 2025–Present | (-) | (-) | (-) | (-) | 3 (5) | 0 (4) | 3 (8) | 6 (17) | 0.35 |
| 31 | (Soviet Union) Serhiy Morozov | 1978–1980, 1982–1986 | (-) | 5 (5) | (-) | (-) | (-) | (-) | (-) | 5 (5) | 1 |
| 31 | (Soviet Union) Viktor Hrachov | 1980–1981, 1982–1990, 1994–1995 | 0 (0) | 5 (6) | (-) | (-) | (-) | (-) | (-) | 5 (6) | 0.83 |
| 31 | (Ukraine) Valeriy Kryventsov | 1991–2001 | 3 (5) | 1 (8) | 1 (3) | (-) | (-) | 0 (5) | (-) | 5 (21) | 0.24 |
| 31 | (Ukraine) Yaroslav Rakitskyi | 2009–2018, 2023–2024 | (-) | (-) | (-) | (-) | 3 (31) | 2 (58) | (-) | 5 (89) | 0.06 |
| 31 | (Israel) Manor Solomon | 2019–2023 | (-) | (-) | (-) | (-) | 1 (9) | 4 (19) | (-) | 5 (28) | 0.18 |
| 31 | (Ukraine) Danylo Sikan | 2019–2025 | (-) | (-) | (-) | (-) | 0 (5) | 5 (18) | (-) | 5 (23) | 0.22 |
| 31 | (Brazil) Kauã Elias | 2025–Present | (-) | (-) | (-) | (-) | 2 (5) | 0 (4) | 3 (13) | 5 (21) | 0.24 |
| 38 | (Ukraine) Yuriy Seleznyov | 1997–2000 | 4 (8) | 0 (5) | (-) | (-) | (-) | (-) | (-) | 4 (13) | 0.31 |
| 38 | (Czech Republic) Tomáš Hübschman | 2004–2014 | 2 (15) | 0 (0) | 0 (0) | 0 (1) | 1 (9) | 1 (55) | (-) | 4 (79) | 0.05 |
| 38 | (Ukraine) Yevhen Seleznyov | 2002–2009, 2011–2012, 2016 | 1 (2) | (-) | (-) | (-) | 0 (0) | 3 (8) | (-) | 4 (10) | 0.4 |
| 38 | (Serbia) Zvonimir Vukić | 2003–2008 | 0 (4) | (-) | (-) | (-) | (-) | 4 (15) | (-) | 4 (19) | 0.21 |
| 38 | (Italy) Cristiano Lucarelli | 2007–2008 | (-) | (-) | (-) | (-) | (-) | 4 (9) | (-) | 4 (9) | 0.44 |
| 38 | (Brazil) Tetê | 2019–2023 | (-) | (-) | (-) | (-) | 1 (8) | 3 (19) | (-) | 4 (27) | 0.15 |
| 38 | (Ukraine) Heorhiy Sudakov | 2020–2026 | (-) | (-) | (-) | (-) | 1 (13) | 3 (24) | 0 (2) | 4 (39) | 0.1 |
| 38 | (Ukraine) Oleksandr Zubkov | 2014–2020, 2022–2025 | (-) | (-) | (-) | (-) | 0 (6) | 4 (20) | (-) | 4 (26) | 0.15 |
| 38 | (Brazil) Eguinaldo | 2023–Present | (-) | (-) | (-) | (-) | 2 (5) | 1 (10) | 1 (8) | 4 (23) | 0.17 |
| 38 | (Brazil) Pedrinho | 2021–Present | (-) | (-) | (-) | (-) | 1 (5) | 2 (13) | 1 (10) | 4 (28) | 0.14 |
| 48 | (Soviet Union) Yuriy Reznyk | 1975–1978 | 2 (4) | 1 (2) | (-) | (-) | (-) | (-) | (-) | 3 (6) | 0.5 |
| 48 | (Soviet Union) Valeriy Shevlyuk | 1970–1971, 1974–1977 | 3 (6) | (-) | (-) | (-) | (-) | (-) | (-) | 3 (6) | 0.5 |
| 48 | (Ukraine) Serhiy Kovalyov | 1994–2000 | 2 (7) | 0 (5) | 1 (3) | (-) | (-) | 0 (6) | (-) | 3 (21) | 0.14 |
| 48 | (Latvia) Andrejs Štolcers | 1997–2000 | 3 (6) | (-) | (-) | (-) | (-) | (-) | (-) | 3 (6) | 0.5 |
| 48 | (Ukraine) Oleksiy Byelik | 1998–2008 | 1 (13) | (-) | (-) | (-) | (-) | 2 (19) | (-) | 3 (32) | 0.09 |
| 48 | (Ukraine) Oleksiy Hai | 2000–2013 | 0 (13) | (-) | (-) | 0 (1) | 3 (6) | 0 (18) | (-) | 3 (37) | 0.08 |
| 48 | (Brazil) Ilsinho | 2007–2010, 2012–2015 | 1 (9) | (-) | (-) | 0 (1) | 1 (8) | 1 (23) | (-) | 3 (40) | 0.08 |
| 48 | (Brazil) Dentinho | 2011–2022 | (-) | (-) | (-) | (-) | 1 (13) | 2 (20) | (-) | 3 (33) | 0.09 |
| 48 | (Ukraine) Mykhailo Mudryk | 2018–2023 | (-) | (-) | (-) | (-) | (-) | 3 (13) | (-) | 3 (13) | 0.23 |
| 48 | (Brazil) Luca Meirelles | 2025–Present | (-) | (-) | (-) | (-) | 0 (0) | 0 (2) | 3 (8) | 3 (10) | 0.3 |
| 58 | (Soviet Union) Oleksiy Varnavsky | 1974, 1977–1986 | 0 (4) | 2 (6) | (-) | (-) | (-) | (-) | (-) | 2 (10) | 0.2 |
| 58 | (Soviet Union) Volodymyr Rohovsky | 1975–1982 | 2 (8) | (-) | (-) | (-) | (-) | (-) | (-) | 2 (8) | 0.25 |
| 58 | (Soviet Union) Vitaliy Starukhin | 1973–1981 | 2 (9) | 0 (2) | (-) | (-) | (-) | (-) | (-) | 2 (11) | 0.18 |
| 58 | (Ukraine) Oleksandr Voskoboynyk | 1993–1996 | (-) | 2 (3) | 0 (4) | (-) | (-) | (-) | (-) | 2 (7) | 0.29 |
| 58 | (Ukraine) Aleksei Bakharev | 1999–2006 | 0 (10) | (-) | (-) | (-) | (-) | 2 (19) | (-) | 2 (29) | 0.07 |
| 58 | (Poland) Mariusz Lewandowski | 2001–2010 | 1 (25) | (-) | (-) | (-) | 0 (4) | 1 (33) | (-) | 2 (62) | 0.03 |
| 58 | (Ukraine) Serhiy Kryvtsov | 2010–2022 | (-) | (-) | (-) | (-) | 2 (15) | 0 (24) | (-) | 2 (39) | 0.05 |
| 58 | (Armenia) Henrikh Mkhitaryan | 2010–2013 | (-) | (-) | (-) | (-) | (-) | 2 (21) | (-) | 2 (21) | 0.1 |
| 58 | (Brazil) Fred | 2013–2018 | (-) | (-) | (-) | (-) | 1 (9) | 1 (30) | (-) | 2 (39) | 0.05 |
| 58 | (Ukraine) Mykola Matviyenko | 2015–Present | (-) | (-) | (-) | (-) | 1 (24) | 1 (46) | 0 (10) | 2 (80) | 0.03 |
| 58 | (Brazil) Dodô | 2018–2022 | (-) | (-) | (-) | (-) | 1 (9) | 1 (21) | (-) | 2 (30) | 0.07 |
| 58 | (Brazil) Marcos Antônio | 2019–2022 | (-) | (-) | (-) | (-) | 1 (10) | 1 (16) | (-) | 2 (26) | 0.08 |
| 58 | (Venezuela) Kevin Kelsy | 2023–2025 | (-) | (-) | (-) | (-) | 1 (3) | 1 (5) | (-) | 2 (8) | 0.25 |
| 58 | (Brazil) Ismaily | 2013–2022 | (-) | (-) | (-) | (-) | 0 (23) | 2 (31) | (-) | 2 (54) | 0.04 |
| 58 | (Brazil) Fernando | 2018–2022 | (-) | (-) | (-) | (-) | 0 (3) | 2 (10) | (-) | 2 (13) | 0.15 |
| 58 | (Burkina Faso) Lassina Traoré | 2021–Present | (-) | (-) | (-) | (-) | 0 (8) | 2 (21) | 0 (5) | 2 (34) | 0.06 |
| 58 | (Ukraine) Maryan Shved | 2022–Present | (-) | (-) | (-) | (-) | 0 (5) | 2 (5) | 0 (2) | 2 (12) | 0.17 |
| 58 | (Ukraine) Artem Bondarenko | 2020–Present | (-) | (-) | (-) | (-) | 0 (20) | 1 (12) | 1 (9) | 2 (41) | 0.05 |
| 58 | (Ukraine) Yehor Nazaryna | 2023–Present | (-) | (-) | (-) | (-) | 0 (9) | 0 (3) | 2 (11) | 2 (23) | 0.09 |
| 58 | (Brazil) Marlon Gomes | 2024–Present | (-) | (-) | (-) | (-) | 0 (5) | 1 (11) | 1 (9) | 2 (25) | 0.08 |
| 58 | (Brazil) Newerton | 2023–Present | (-) | (-) | (-) | (-) | 1 (7) | 0 (12) | 1 (10) | 2 (29) | 0.07 |
| 58 | (Brazil) Isaque Silva | 2025–Present | (-) | (-) | (-) | (-) | 0 (0) | 0 (4) | 2 (12) | 2 (16) | 0.13 |
| 58 | (Venezuela) Gleiker Mendoza | 2026–Present | (-) | (-) | (-) | (-) | (-) | 2 (4) | (-) | 2 (4) | 0.5 |
| 81 | (Soviet Union) Oleksandr Vasin | 1971–1976 | 1 (4) | (-) | (-) | (-) | (-) | (-) | (-) | 1 (4) | 0.25 |
| 81 | (Soviet Union) Anatoliy Radenko | 1977–1980, 1983–1987, 1990 | 0 (2) | 1 (5) | (-) | (-) | (-) | (-) | (-) | 1 (7) | 0.14 |
| 81 | (Ukraine) Ihor Petrov | 1981–1991, 1994–1996, 1998 | 1 (2) | 0 (8) | (-) | (-) | (-) | (-) | (-) | 1 (10) | 0.1 |
| 81 | (Ukraine) Oleksandr Ostashov | 1995, 1996 | (-) | (-) | 1 (3) | (-) | (-) | (-) | (-) | 1 (3) | 0.33 |
| 81 | (Ukraine) Volodymyr Pyatenko | 1995–1997 | (-) | 0 (3) | 1 (4) | (-) | (-) | (-) | (-) | 1 (7) | 0.14 |
| 81 | (Ukraine) Volodymyr Yaksmanytskyi | 1995–1999 | 0 (4) | 0 (2) | 1 (4) | (-) | (-) | (-) | (-) | 1 (10) | 0.1 |
| 81 | (Georgia (country)) Mikheil Potskhveria | 1996–2000 | 0 (4) | 1 (4) | 0 (4) | (-) | (-) | (-) | (-) | 1 (12) | 0.08 |
| 81 | (Ukraine) Yuriy Benyo | 1999–2000 | 1 (4) | (-) | (-) | (-) | (-) | (-) | (-) | 1 (4) | 0.25 |
| 81 | (Lithuania) Dainius Gleveckas | 1999–2004 | 0 (5) | (-) | (-) | (-) | (-) | 1 (10) | (-) | 1 (15) | 0.07 |
| 81 | (Ukraine) Anatoliy Tymoshchuk | 1998–2007 | 0 (21) | (-) | (-) | (-) | (-) | 1 (36) | (-) | 1 (57) | 0.02 |
| 81 | (Ukraine) Dmytro Chyhrynskyi | 2002–2009, 2010–2015, 2023 | 0 (14) | (-) | (-) | 0 (1) | 0 (1) | 1 (30) | (-) | 1 (45) | 0.02 |
| 81 | (Romania) Răzvan Raț | 2003–2013 | 0 (23) | (-) | (-) | 0 (1) | 0 (9) | 1 (57) | (-) | 1 (89) | 0.01 |
| 81 | (Ukraine) Vasyl Kobin | 2009–2017 | (-) | (-) | (-) | 0 (1) | 1 (6) | 0 (4) | (-) | 1 (10) | 0.1 |
| 81 | (Ukraine) Kostyantyn Kravchenko | 2008–2012 | (-) | (-) | (-) | (-) | 1 (4) | (-) | (-) | 1 (4) | 0.25 |
| 81 | (Ukraine) Oleksandr Kucher | 2006–2017 | 0 (7) | (-) | (-) | 0 (1) | 1 (22) | 0 (54) | (-) | 1 (83) | 0.01 |
| 81 | (Mexico) Nery Castillo | 2007–2011 | (-) | (-) | (-) | (-) | (-) | 1 (5) | (-) | 1 (5) | 0.2 |
| 81 | (Ukraine) Maksym Malyshev | 2009–2021 | (-) | (-) | (-) | (-) | 1 (19) | 0 (4) | (-) | 1 (23) | 0.04 |
| 81 | (Argentina) Gustavo Blanco Leschuk | 2017–2019 | (-) | (-) | (-) | (-) | 1 (2) | 0 (0) | (-) | 1 (2) | 0.5 |
| 81 | (Brazil) Maycon | 2018–2026 | (-) | (-) | (-) | (-) | 0 (7) | 1 (22) | 0 (0) | 1 (29) | 0.03 |
| 81 | (Ukraine) Yevhen Konoplyanka | 2019–2021 | (-) | (-) | (-) | (-) | 0 (9) | 1 (6) | (-) | 1 (15) | 0.07 |
| 81 | (Ukraine) Valeriy Bondar | 2019–Present | (-) | (-) | (-) | (-) | 0 (11) | 0 (29) | 1 (12) | 1 (52) | 0.02 |
| 81 | (Brazil) Pedro Henrique | 2023–Present | (-) | (-) | (-) | (-) | 0 (6) | 0 (10) | 1 (11) | 1 (27) | 0.04 |
| 81 | (Brazil) Lucas Ferreira | 2025–Present | (-) | (-) | (-) | (-) | 0 (0) | 0 (3) | 1 (11) | 1 (14) | 0.07 |
| 81 | (Ukraine) Oleh Ocheretko | 2020–Present | (-) | (-) | (-) | (-) | 0 (6) | 0 (5) | 1 (11) | 1 (22) | 0.05 |
| 81 | (Brazil) Vinicius Tobias | 2022–Present | (-) | (-) | (-) | (-) | 0 (6) | 1 (7) | 0 (14) | 1 (27) | 0.04 |
