= AS Monaco FC in European football =

French club in European football

Association Sportive de Monaco Football Club is a French–listed football club, located in Monaco. They received entry to their first European competition, the European Cup, after being crowned as winners of the league in 1961. The side qualified for the beginning round, the preliminary stage, where they were beaten 4–6 on aggregate by Scottish opponents Rangers in both legs of the tie, 2–3 at home, and 3–2 on foreign ground. As runners-up of the French annual cup, the Coupe de France, AS Monaco added their name to a second European tournament, the 1974–75 European Cup Winners' Cup, also exiting in the first phase against Eintracht Frankfurt with a 2–5 total score.

The outfit achieved their best results in the 1991–92 European Cup Winners' Cup, being defeated in the final 0–2 against Werder Bremen, and the 2003–04 UEFA Champions League, where they suffered a 0–3 loss to Porto. AS Monaco recorded their highest win against Swansea City of Wales with 8–0 at the Stade Louis II in the first phase, second leg of the 1991–92 Cup Winners' Cup. Their largest deficit was against a Scottish club, Dundee United, in the 1981–82 UEFA Cup first home round which they lost 2–5. The club's latest participation was in the 2026–27 UEFA Conference League league phase.

== Matches ==
List of AS Monaco FC matches
Season	Competition	Round	Opposition	Home	Away	Agg.	Ref.
1961–62	European Cup	Preliminary round	(Scotland) Rangers	2–3	2–3	4–6	
1963–64	European Cup	Preliminary round	(Greece) AEK Athens	7–2	1–1	8–3	
1963–64	European Cup	First round	(Italy) Internazionale	1–3	0–1	1–4	
1974–75	European Cup Winners' Cup	First round	(West Germany) Eintracht Frankfurt	2–2	0–3	2–5	
1978–79	European Cup	Preliminary round	(Romania) Steaua București	3–0	0–2	3–2	
1978–79	European Cup	First round	(Sweden) Malmö FF	0–1	0–0	0–1	
1979–80	UEFA Cup	First round	(Soviet Union) Shakhtar Donetsk	2–0	1–2	3–2	
1979–80	UEFA Cup	Second round	(Bulgaria) Lokomotiv Sofia	2–1	2–4	4–5	
1980–81	European Cup Winners' Cup	First round	(Spain) Valencia	3–3	0–2	3–5	
1981–82	UEFA Cup	First round	(Scotland) Dundee United	2–5	2–1	4–6	
1982–83	European Cup	First round	(Bulgaria) CSKA Sofia	0–0	0–2 (Note: After extra time)	0–2	
1984–85	UEFA Cup	First round	(Bulgaria) CSKA Sofia	2–2	1–2	3–4	
1985–86	European Cup Winners' Cup	First round	(Romania) Universitatea Craiova	2–0	0–3	2–3	
1988–89	European Cup	First round	(Iceland) Valur	2–0	0–1	2–1	
1988–89	European Cup	Second round	(Belgium) Club Brugge	6–1	0–1	6–2	
1988–89	European Cup	Quarter-final	(Turkey) Galatasaray	0–1	1–1	1–2	
1989–90	European Cup Winners' Cup	First round	(Portugal) Belenenses	3–0	1–1	4–1	
1989–90	European Cup Winners' Cup	Second round	(East Germany) Dynamo Berlin	0–0	1–1	1–1 (Note: Won on away goals)	
1989–90	European Cup Winners' Cup	Quarter-final	(Spain) Valladolid	0–0	0–0	0–0 (Note: Won 3–1 on penalties)	
1989–90	European Cup Winners' Cup	Semi-final	(Italy) Sampdoria	2–2	0–2	2–4	
1990–91	UEFA Cup	First round	(Netherlands) Roda JC	3–1	3–1	6–2	
1990–91	UEFA Cup	Second round	(Soviet Union) Chornomorets Odesa	1–0	0–0	1–0	
1990–91	UEFA Cup	Third round	(Soviet Union) Torpedo Moscow	1–2	1–2	2–4	
1991–92	European Cup Winners' Cup	First round	(Wales) Swansea City	8–0	2–1	10–1	
1991–92	European Cup Winners' Cup	Second round	(Sweden) IFK Norrköping	1–0	2–1	3–1	
1991–92	European Cup Winners' Cup	Quarter-final	(Italy) Roma	1–0	0–0	1–0	
1991–92	European Cup Winners' Cup	Semi-final	(Netherlands) Feyenoord	1–1	2–2	3–3 (Note: Lost on away goals)	
1991–92	European Cup Winners' Cup	Final	(Germany) Werder Bremen	0–2 (N)			
1992–93	European Cup Winners' Cup	First round	(Poland) Miedź Legnica	0–0	1–0	1–0	
1992–93	European Cup Winners' Cup	Second round	(Greece) Olympiacos	0–1	0–0	0–1	
1993–94	UEFA Champions League	First round	(Greece) AEK Athens	1–0	1–1	2–1	
1993–94	UEFA Champions League	Second round	(Romania) Steaua București	4–1	0–1	4–2	
1993–94	UEFA Champions League	Group stage	(Russia) (Russia) Spartak Moscow	4–1	0–0	2nd	
1993–94	UEFA Champions League	Group stage	(Spain) Barcelona	0–1	0–2	2nd	
1993–94	UEFA Champions League	Group stage	(Turkey) Galatasaray	3–0	2–0	2nd	
1993–94	UEFA Champions League	Semi-final	(Italy) Milan	0–3 (A)			
1995–96	UEFA Cup	First round	(England) Leeds United	0–3	1–0	1–3	
1996–97	UEFA Cup	First round	(Poland) Hutnik Kraków	3–1	1–0	4–1	
1996–97	UEFA Cup	Second round	(Germany) Borussia Mönchengladbach	0–1	4–2	4–3	
1996–97	UEFA Cup	Third round	(Germany) Hamburger SV	3–0	2–0	5–0	
1996–97	UEFA Cup	Quarter-final	(England) Newcastle United	3–0	1–0	4–0	
1996–97	UEFA Cup	Semi-final	(Italy) Internazionale	1–0	1–3	2–3	
1997–98	UEFA Champions League	Group stage	(Portugal) Sporting CP	3–2	0–3	1st	
1997–98	UEFA Champions League	Group stage	(Germany) Bayer Leverkusen	4–0	2–2	1st	
1997–98	UEFA Champions League	Group stage	(Belgium) Lierse	5–1	1–0	1st	
1997–98	UEFA Champions League	Quarter-final	(England) Manchester United	0–0	1–1	1–1	
1997–98	UEFA Champions League	Semi-final	(Italy) Juventus	3–2	1–4	4–6	
1998–99	UEFA Cup	First round	(Poland) ŁKS Łódź	0–0	3–1	3–1	
1998–99	UEFA Cup	Second round	(Austria) Grazer AK	4–0	3–3	7–3	
1998–99	UEFA Cup	Third round	(France) Marseille	2–2	0–1	2–3	
1999–2000	UEFA Cup	First round	(Scotland) St Johnstone	3–0	3–3	6–3	
1999–2000	UEFA Cup	Second round	(Poland) Widzew Łódź	2–0	1–1	3–1	
1999–2000	UEFA Cup	Third round	(Greece) AEK Athens	1–0	2–2	3–2	
1999–2000	UEFA Cup	Fourth round	(Spain) Mallorca	1–0	1–4	2–4	
2000–01	UEFA Champions League	First group stage	(Turkey) Galatasaray	4–2	2–3	4th	
2000–01	UEFA Champions League	First group stage	(Scotland) Rangers	0–1	2–2	4th	
2000–01	UEFA Champions League	First group stage	(Austria) Sturm Graz	5–0	0–2	4th	
2003–04	UEFA Champions League	Group stage	(Netherlands) PSV Eindhoven	1–1	2–1	1st	
2003–04	UEFA Champions League	Group stage	(Greece) AEK Athens	4–0	0–0	1st	
2003–04	UEFA Champions League	Group stage	(Spain) Deportivo La Coruña	8–3	0–1	1st	
2003–04	UEFA Champions League	First knockout round	(Russia) Lokomotiv Moscow	1–0	1–2	2–2	
2003–04	UEFA Champions League	Quarter-final	(Spain) Real Madrid	3–1	2–4	5–5	
2003–04	UEFA Champions League	Semi-final	(England) Chelsea	3–1	2–2	5–3	
2003–04	UEFA Champions League	Final	(Portugal) Porto	0–3 (N)			
2004–05	UEFA Champions League	Third qualifying round	(Slovenia) Gorica	6–0	3–0	9–0	
2004–05	UEFA Champions League	Group stage	(England) Liverpool	1–0	0–2	1st	
2004–05	UEFA Champions League	Group stage	(Spain) Deportivo La Coruña	2–0	5–0	1st	
2004–05	UEFA Champions League	Group stage	(Greece) Olympiacos	2–1	0–1	1st	
2004–05	UEFA Champions League	First knockout round	(Netherlands) PSV Eindhoven	0–2	0–1	0–3	
2005–06	UEFA Champions League	Third qualifying round	(Spain) Real Betis	2–2	0–1	2–3	
2005–06	UEFA Cup	First round	(Netherlands) Willem II	2–0	3–1	5–1	
2005–06	UEFA Cup	Group stage	(Norway) Viking	—N/a	0–1	1st	
2005–06	UEFA Cup	Group stage	(Germany) Hamburger SV	2–0	—N/a	1st	
2005–06	UEFA Cup	Group stage	(Czech Republic) Slavia Prague	—N/a	2–0	1st	
2005–06	UEFA Cup	Group stage	(Bulgaria) CSKA Sofia	2–1	—N/a	1st	
2005–06	UEFA Cup	Round of 32	(Switzerland) Basel	1–1	0–1	1–2	
2014–15	UEFA Champions League	Group stage	(Germany) Bayer Leverkusen	1–0	1–0	1st	
2014–15	UEFA Champions League	Group stage	(Russia) Zenit Saint Petersburg	2–0	0–0	1st	
2014–15	UEFA Champions League	Group stage	(Portugal) Benfica	0–0	0–1	1st	
2014–15	UEFA Champions League	Round of 16	(England) Arsenal	0–2	3–1	3–3	
2014–15	UEFA Champions League	Quarter-final	(Italy) Juventus	0–0	0–1	0–1	
2015–16	UEFA Champions League	Third qualifying round	(Switzerland) Young Boys	4–0	3–1	7–1	
2015–16	UEFA Champions League	Play-off round	(Spain) Valencia	2–1	1–3	3–4	
2015–16	UEFA Europa League	Group H	(England) Tottenham Hotspur	1–1	1–4	3rd	
2015–16	UEFA Europa League	Group H	(Belgium) Anderlecht	0–2	1–1	3rd	
2015–16	UEFA Europa League	Group H	(Azerbaijan) Qarabağ	1–0	1–1	3rd	
2016–17	UEFA Champions League	Third qualifying round	(Turkey) Fenerbahçe	3–1	1–2	4–3	
2016–17	UEFA Champions League	Play-off round	(Spain) Villarreal	1–0	2–1	3–1	
2016–17	UEFA Champions League	Group E	(Russia) CSKA Moscow	3–0	1–1	1st	
2016–17	UEFA Champions League	Group E	(Germany) Bayer Leverkusen	1–1	0–3	1st	
2016–17	UEFA Champions League	Group E	(England) Tottenham Hotspur	2–1	2–1	1st	
2016–17	UEFA Champions League	Round of 16	(England) Manchester City	3–1	3–5	6–6	
2016–17	UEFA Champions League	Quarter-final	(Germany) Borussia Dortmund	3–1	3–2	6–3	
2016–17	UEFA Champions League	Semi-final	(Italy) Juventus	0–2	1–2	1–4	
2017–18	UEFA Champions League	Group G	(Germany) RB Leipzig	1–4	1–1	4th	
2017–18	UEFA Champions League	Group G	(Portugal) Porto	0–3	2–5	4th	
2017–18	UEFA Champions League	Group G	(Turkey) Beşiktaş	1–2	1–1	4th	
2018–19	UEFA Champions League	Group A	(Spain) Atlético Madrid	1–2	0–2	4th	
2018–19	UEFA Champions League	Group A	(Germany) Borussia Dortmund	0–2	0–3	4th	
2018–19	UEFA Champions League	Group A	(Belgium) Club Brugge	0–4	1–1	4th	
2021–22	UEFA Champions League	Third qualifying round	(Czech Republic) Sparta Prague	3–1	2–0	5–1	
2021–22	UEFA Champions League	Play-off round	(Ukraine) Shakhtar Donetsk	0–1	2–2 (a.e.t.)	2–3	
2021–22	UEFA Europa League	Group B	(Netherlands) PSV Eindhoven	0–0	2–1	1st	
2021–22	UEFA Europa League	Group B	(Spain) Real Sociedad	2–1	1–1	1st	
2021–22	UEFA Europa League	Group B	(Austria) Sturm Graz	1–0	1–1	1st	
2021–22	UEFA Europa League	Round of 16	(Portugal) Braga	1–1	0–2	1–3	
2022–23	UEFA Champions League	Third qualifying round	(Netherlands) PSV Eindhoven	1–1	2–3 (a.e.t.)	3–4	
2022–23	UEFA Europa League	Group H	(Serbia) Red Star Belgrade	4–1	1–0	2nd	
2022–23	UEFA Europa League	Group H	(Hungary) Ferencváros	0–1	1–1	2nd	
2022–23	UEFA Europa League	Group H	(Turkey) Trabzonspor	3–1	0–4	2nd	
2022–23	UEFA Europa League	Knockout round play-off	(Germany) Bayer Leverkusen	2–3 (a.e.t.)	3–2	5–5 (Note: Lost 3–5 on penalties)	
2024–25	UEFA Champions League	League phase	(Spain) Barcelona	2–1	—N/a	17th	
2024–25	UEFA Champions League	League phase	(Croatia) Dinamo Zagreb	—N/a	2–2	17th	
2024–25	UEFA Champions League	League phase	(Serbia) Red Star Belgrade	5–1	—N/a	17th	
2024–25	UEFA Champions League	League phase	(Italy) Bologna	—N/a	1–0	17th	
2024–25	UEFA Champions League	League phase	(Portugal) Benfica	2–3	—N/a	17th	
2024–25	UEFA Champions League	League phase	(England) Arsenal	—N/a	0–3	17th	
2024–25	UEFA Champions League	League phase	(England) Aston Villa	1–0	—N/a	17th	
2024–25	UEFA Champions League	League phase	(Italy) Internazionale	—N/a	0–3	17th	
2024–25	UEFA Champions League	Knockout phase play-off	(Portugal) Benfica	0–1	3–3	3–4	
2025–26	UEFA Champions League	League phase	(Belgium) Club Brugge	—N/a	1–4	21st	
2025–26	UEFA Champions League	League phase	(England) Manchester City	2–2	—N/a	21st	
2025–26	UEFA Champions League	League phase	(England) Tottenham Hotspur	0–0	—N/a	21st	
2025–26	UEFA Champions League	League phase	(Norway) Bodø/Glimt	—N/a	1–0	21st	
2025–26	UEFA Champions League	League phase	(Cyprus) Pafos	—N/a	2–2	21st	
2025–26	UEFA Champions League	League phase	(Turkey) Galatasaray	1–0	—N/a	21st	
2025–26	UEFA Champions League	League phase	(Spain) Real Madrid	—N/a	1–6	21st	
2025–26	UEFA Champions League	League phase	(Italy) Juventus	0–0	—N/a	21st	
2025–26	UEFA Champions League	Knockout phase play-off	(France) Paris Saint-Germain	2–3	2–2	4–5	
2026–27	UEFA Conference League	Play-off round	(Poland) Górnik Zabrze	4–1	3–2	7–3	
2026–27	UEFA Conference League	League phase	(Bulgaria) CSKA Sofia	—N/a			
2026–27	UEFA Conference League	League phase	(Germany) SC Freiburg		—N/a		
2026–27	UEFA Conference League	League phase	(Denmark) Nordsjælland		—N/a		
2026–27	UEFA Conference League	League phase	(Scotland) Heart of Midlothian	—N/a			
2026–27	UEFA Conference League	League phase	(England) Brighton & Hove Albion	—N/a			
2026–27	UEFA Conference League	League phase	(Gibraltar) Lincoln Red Imps		—N/a		

== Overall record ==
=== By competition ===
As of 12 December 2017

Competition	Pld	W	D	L	GF	GA	GD	Win% (Note: Win% is rounded to two decimal places)	Refs
European Cup / UEFA Champions League	117	47	24	46	183	156	+27	43.48	
European Cup Winners' Cup / UEFA Cup Winners' Cup	27	8	13	6	32	27	+5	29.63	
UEFA Cup / UEFA Europa League	54	27	12	15	86	64	+22	50.00	
Total	180	76	46	58	278	212	+66	43.68	

=== By country ===
As of 22 November 2016

Country	Pld	W	D	L	GF	GA	GD	Win%
Austria	4	2	1	1	12	5	+7	50.00
Azerbaijan	2	1	1	0	2	1	+1	50.00
Belgium	6	3	1	2	13	6	+7	50.00
Bulgaria	7	2	2	3	9	12	–3	28.57
Czech Republic	1	1	0	0	2	0	+2	100.00
East Germany	2	0	2	0	1	1	0	0.00
England	16	8	4	4	21	19	+2	50.00
France	2	0	1	1	2	3	–1	0.00
Germany	11	7	2	2	20	8	+12	63.64
Greece	12	5	5	2	19	9	+10	41.67
Iceland	2	1	0	1	2	1	+1	50.00
Italy	13	3	3	7	10	21	–11	23.08
Netherlands	10	5	3	2	17	11	+6	50.00
Norway	1	0	0	1	0	1	–1	0.00
Poland	8	5	3	0	11	3	+8	62.50
Portugal	7	2	2	3	7	10	–3	28.57
Romania	6	3	0	3	9	7	+2	50.00
Russia	8	4	3	1	12	4	+8	50.00
Scotland	8	2	2	4	16	18	–2	25.00
Slovenia	2	2	0	0	9	0	+9	100.00
Soviet Union	6	2	1	3	6	6	0	33.33
Spain	20	8	4	8	33	29	+4	40.00
Sweden	4	2	1	1	3	2	+1	50.00
Switzerland	4	2	1	1	8	3	+5	50.00
Turkey	8	4	1	3	16	10	+6	50.00
Wales	2	2	0	0	10	1	+9	100.00
West Germany	2	0	1	1	2	5	–3	0.00
Total	174	76	44	54	272	196	+76	43.68

=== European Finals ===
Year	Competition	Opposition	Score	Venue
1992	Cup Winners' Cup	(Germany) Werder Bremen	0–2	(Portugal) Estádio da Luz, Lisbon
2004	Champions League	(Portugal) Porto	0–3	(Germany) Arena AufSchalke, Gelsenkirchen
