= Jürgen Rollmann =

German footballer

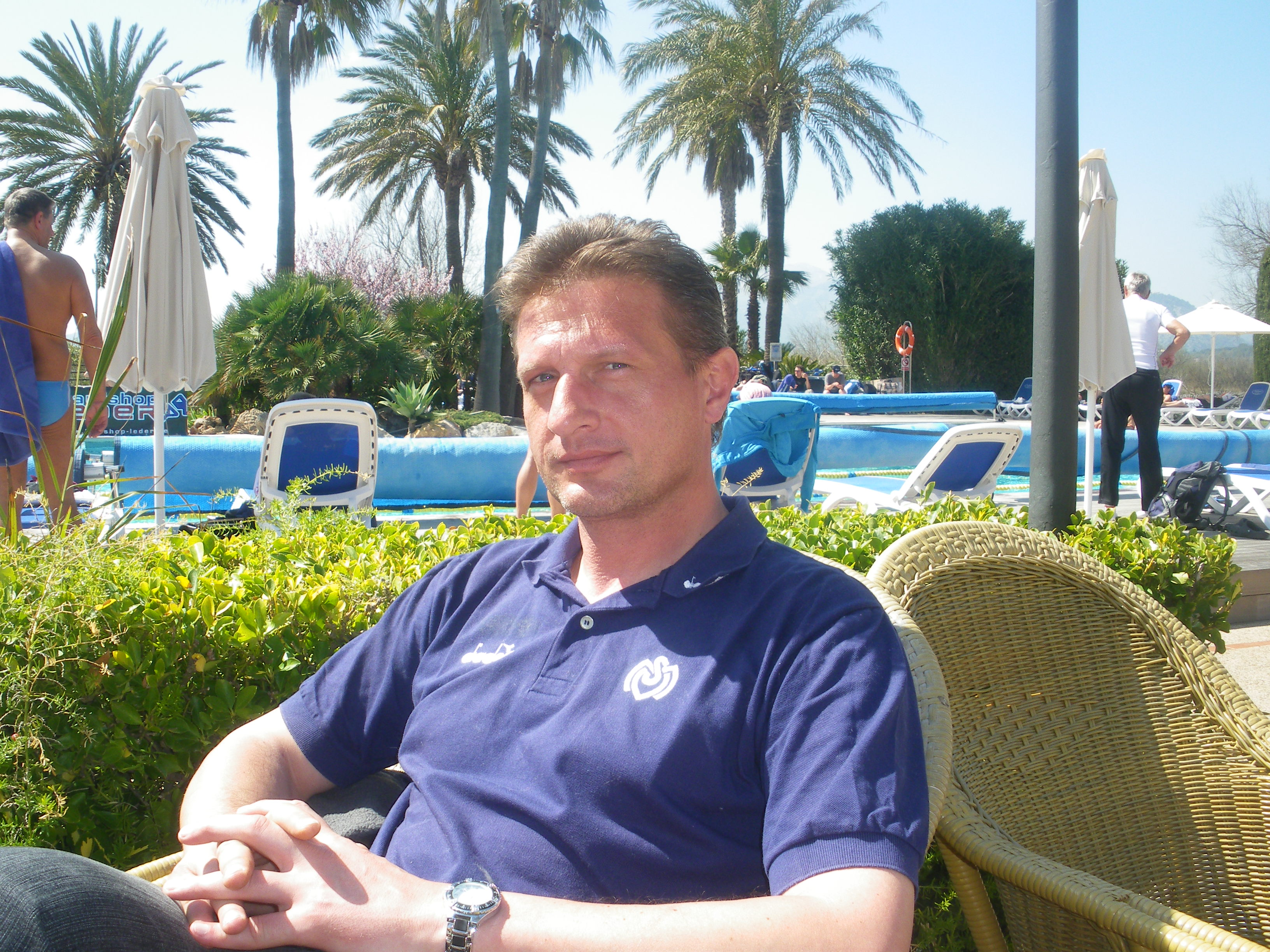

Personal information
- Date of birth: 17 October 1966 (age 60)
- Place of birth: Gelnhausen, West Germany
- Height: 1.89 m (6 ft 2 in)
- Position: Goalkeeper

Youth career
- 1974–1979: FC Lorbach
- 1979–1985: Kickers Offenbach

Senior career*
Years	Team	Apps	(Gls)
1985–1986	Kickers Offenbach	9	(0)
1986–1987	TSV 1860 München	0	(0)
1987–1988	FSV Frankfurt		
1988–1992	Werder Bremen	9	(0)
1992–1995	MSV Duisburg	79	(0)
1995	Werder Bremen (A)	5	(0)
1995–1997	FC Augsburg	24	(0)
- * Club domestic league appearances and goals

Jürgen Rollmann (born 17 October 1966) is a German former professional footballer who played as a goalkeeper.

The most notable game of his career was the victorious 1992 European Cup Winners' Cup Final for Werder Bremen, which he played instead of Oliver Reck who was suspended.
