= 1992 European Cup Winners' Cup final =

1992 European Cup Winners' Cup Final
- Match programme cover
- Event: 1991–92 European Cup Winners' Cup
Monaco	Werder Bremen
(France)	(Germany)
0	2
- Date: 6 May 1992
- Venue: Estádio da Luz, Lisbon
- Referee: Pietro d'Elia (Italy)
- Attendance: 16,000

The 1992 European Cup Winners' Cup Final was a football match contested between Monaco of France and Werder Bremen of Germany (who qualified for the tournament through the West German berth). It was the final match of the 1991–92 European Cup Winners' Cup and the 32nd European Cup Winners' Cup final. The final was held at Estádio da Luz in Lisbon. The attendance of 16,000 in a stadium which, at the time, had a capacity of around 130,000 meant that this was one of the most sparsely attended UEFA finals of all time, both in actual and relative terms. Bremen won the match 2–0 thanks to goals of Klaus Allofs and Wynton Rufer.

== Route to the final ==
(France) Monaco				Round	(Germany) Werder Bremen			
Opponent	Agg.	1st leg	2nd leg	Stages	Opponent	Agg.	1st leg	2nd leg
(Wales) Swansea City	10–1	2–1 (A)	8–0 (H)	First round	(Romania) Bacău	11–0	6–0 (A)	5–0 (H)
(Sweden) IFK Norrköping	3–0	2–1 (A)	1–0 (H)	Second round	(Hungary) Ferencváros	4–2	3–2 (H)	1–0 (A)
(Italy) Roma	1–0	0–0 (A)	1–0 (H)	Quarter-finals	(Turkey) Galatasaray	2–1	2–1 (H)	0–0 (A)
(Netherlands) Feyenoord	3–3 (a)	1–1 (H)	2–2 (A)	Semi-finals	(Belgium) Club Brugge	2–1	0–1 (A)	2–0 (H)

== Match ==
=== Details ===
6 May 1992
19:15 WEST

Monaco (France)	0–2	(Germany) Werder Bremen
	Report	Allofs 41'; Rufer 54'

Estádio da Luz, Lisbon
Attendance: 16,000
Referee: Pietro D'Elia (Italy)

Monaco	Werder Bremen

GK	1	(France) Jean-Luc Ettori (c)
RB	5	(Senegal) Roger Mendy
CB	3	(France) Luc Sonor
CB	4	(France) Emmanuel Petit		(substituted off) 63'
LB	2	(France) Patrick Valéry
RM	7	(France) Jérôme Gnako	(yellow card) 65'
CM	6	(France) Marcel Dib	(yellow card) 38'
CM	8	(Portugal) Rui Barros
LM	10	(France) Gérald Passi
CF	11	(Ivory Coast) Youssouf Fofana		(substituted off) 60'
CF	9	(Liberia) George Weah	(yellow card) 85'
Substitutes:
GK	16	(France) Angelo Hugues
DF	12	(France) Patrick Blondeau
FW	13	(France) Benjamin Clément		(substituted on) 60'
FW	14	(France) Youri Djorkaeff		(substituted on) 63'
DF	15	(France) Lilian Thuram
Manager:
(France) Arsène Wenger

GK	1	(Germany) Jürgen Rollmann
SW	4	(Norway) Rune Bratseth
CB	3	(Germany) Thomas Wolter		(substituted off) 80'
CB	6	(Germany) Uli Borowka
RWB	2	(Germany) Manfred Bockenfeld
LWB	5	(Germany) Marco Bode
CM	7	(Germany) Dieter Eilts
CM	8	(Germany) Miroslav Votava (c)	(yellow card) 27'
AM	9	(Germany) Frank Neubarth		(substituted off) 75'
RF	10	(New Zealand) Wynton Rufer
LF	11	(Germany) Klaus Allofs
Substitutes:
GK	12	(Germany) Florian Klugmann
FW	13	(Germany) Stefan Kohn		(substituted on) 75'
MF	14	(Germany) Thorsten Legat
DF	15	(Germany) Thomas Schaaf		(substituted on) 80'
FW	16	(Germany) Marinus Bester
Manager:
(Germany) Otto Rehhagel

Assistant referees:
Domenico Ramicone (Italy)
Franco Andreozzi (Italy)
Fourth official:
Arcangelo Pezzella (Italy)

Match rules

- 90 minutes.
- 30 minutes of extra time if necessary.
- Penalty shoot-out if scores still level.
- Five named substitutes.
- Maximum of two substitutions.

== See also ==
- 1992 European Cup Final
- 1992 UEFA Cup Final
- AS Monaco FC in European football
- SV Werder Bremen in European football
