= 1991–92 Hannover 96 season =

Hannover 96
1991–92 season
- President: Fritz Willig
- Manager: Michael Lorkowski
- Stadium: Niedersachsenstadion
- 2. Bundesliga Nord: 5th
- DFB-Pokal: Winners
- Top goalscorer: League: Roman Wójcicki (5 goals); All: Martin Groth; Patrick Grün; Roman Wójcicki (6 goals each)
- Highest home attendance: 25,000
- Lowest home attendance: 3,000
- Average home league attendance: 7,684
- Biggest win: NSC Marathon 0–7 Hannover
- Biggest defeat: Oldenburg 5–0 Hannover
Home colours

The 1991–92 Hannover 96 season is the 96th season in the football club's history and 29th overall season in the second flight of German football, the 2. Bundesliga, and their third consecutive season having been relegated from the Bundesliga in 1989. Hannover 96 also participated in this season's edition of the domestic cup, the DFB-Pokal, and won the cup for the first time in club history, becoming the first team outside the Bundesliga to do so. This is the 33rd season for Hannover in the Niedersachsenstadion, located in Hanover, Lower Saxony, Germany. The season covers a period from 1 July 1991 to 30 June 1992.

== Players ==
=== Squad information ===
Note: Flags indicate national team as defined under FIFA eligibility rules; some limited exceptions apply. Players may hold more than one non-FIFA nationality.

No.	Pos.	Nation	Player
–	GK	GER	Oliver Kirchel
–	GK	GER	Jörg Sievers
–	DF	GER	Axel Bernd
–	DF	GER	Oliver Bock
–	DF	GER	Bernd Heemsoth
–	DF	GER	Jörg-Uwe Klütz
–	DF	GER	Mathias Kuhlmey
–	DF	DEN	Michael Schjønberg
–	DF	GER	Axel Sundermann
–	DF	POL	Roman Wójcicki
–	MF	GER	Meik Ehlert
–	MF	GER	Oliver Freund
–	MF	GER	Jens Friedemann

No.	Pos.	Nation	Player
–	MF	GER	Martin Groth
–	MF	GER	Jörg Kretzschmar
–	MF	GER	André Sirocks
–	MF	GER	Karsten Surmann (captain)
–	FW	BIH	Sergej Barbarez
–	FW	GER	André Breitenreiter
–	FW	YUG	Miloš Đelmaš
–	FW	GER	Patrick Grün
–	FW	GER	Uwe Jursch
–	FW	GER	Michael Koch
–	FW	GER	Waldemar Steubing
–	FW	GER	Niclas Weiland

=== Transfers ===
==== In ====
Pos	Player	From	Type	Window	Fee
FW	(Germany) Michael Koch	(Germany) Hamburger SV	Transfer	Summer	€25,000
MF	(Germany) Meik Ehlert	(Germany) Condor Hamburg	Transfer	Summer	Free
FW	(Germany) Uwe Jursch	(Germany) VfL Osnabrück	Transfer	Summer	Free
MF	(Germany) André Sirocks	(Germany) Union Berlin	Transfer	Summer	Free
GK	(Germany) Waldemar Steubing	(Germany) FC St. Pauli	Transfer	Summer	Free
MF	(Germany) Oliver Freund	(Germany) Werder Bremen	Loan	Summer	Free
DF	(England) Neale Marmon	(England) Colchester United	Return from loan	Summer	–
FW	(Bosnia and Herzegovina) Sergej Barbarez	(Bosnia and Herzegovina) Velež Mostar	Transfer	Winter	Free
FW	(Socialist Federal Republic of Yugoslavia) Miloš Đelmaš	(France) OGC Nice	Transfer	Winter	Free

==== Out ====
Pos	Player	To	Type	Window	Fee
FW	(Germany) Jochen Heisig	(Germany) 1860 Munich	Transfer	Summer	€200,000
DF	(England) Neale Marmon	(Germany) FC Homburg	Transfer	Summer	€30,000
MF	(Turkey) Hakan Bicici	(Germany) TuS Celle	Transfer	Summer	Free
MF	(Germany) Michael Karl	(Germany) SpVgg Bayreuth	Transfer	Summer	Free
MF	(Germany) Michael Kautz	(Germany) VfV Hildesheim	Transfer	Summer	Free
MF	(Germany) Thomas Laumann	(Germany) VfL Herzlake	Transfer	Summer	Free
MF	(Tunisia) Nabil Maâloul	(Tunisia) Espérance	Transfer	Summer	Free
FW	(Germany) Uwe Eckel	(Germany) 1. FC Kaiserslautern	End of loan	Summer	–

== Competitions ==
Win Draw Loss

=== Overview ===
Competition	First match	Last match	Starting round	Final position	Record							
Competition	First match	Last match	Starting round	Final position	Pld	W	D	L	GF	GA	GD	Win %
2. Bundesliga Nord	24 July 1991	17 May 1992	Matchday 1	5th	32	10	14	8	34	37	−3	31.25
DFB-Pokal	27 July 1991	23 May 1992	First round	Winners	7	5	2	0	16	5	+11	71.43
Total					39	15	16	8	50	42	+8	38.46

Source: Competitions

=== 2. Bundesliga North ===
==== League table ====
Pos	Team	Pld	W	D	L	GF	GA	GD	Pts	Promotion, qualification or relegation
1	Bayer Uerdingen (C, P)	32	15	9	8	47	29	+18	39	Promotion to Bundesliga
2	VfB Oldenburg	32	12	14	6	56	39	+17	38	
3	Hertha BSC	32	13	9	10	46	41	+5	35	
4	FC St. Pauli	32	13	9	10	40	38	+2	35	
5	Hannover 96	32	10	14	8	34	37	−3	34	
6	SV Meppen	32	10	10	12	36	37	−1	30	
7	Eintracht Braunschweig	32	12	9	11	54	48	+6	33	
8	FC Remscheid	32	8	15	9	39	38	+1	31	
9	VfL Osnabrück	32	10	11	11	45	54	−9	31	
10	Blau-Weiß Berlin (Note: Blau-Weiß Berlin was denied a license for the 1992–93 season, thereby being automatically relegated. Fortuna Köln took part in the relegation play-offs instead.) (R)	32	11	8	13	41	50	−9	30	Relegation to Oberliga
11	Fortuna Köln (O)	32	8	9	15	39	50	−11	25	Qualification to relegation play-offs
12	Stahl Brandenburg (R)	32	8	7	17	37	53	−16	23	Relegation to Oberliga

Source: kicker.de (Top half, bottom half)
(C) Champions; (O) Play-off winners; (P) Promoted; (R) Relegated

==== Results summary ====
Overall								Home						Away					
Pld	W	D	L	GF	GA	GD	Pts	W	D	L	GF	GA	GD	W	D	L	GF	GA	GD
32	10	14	8	34	37	−3	34	6	7	3	20	17	+3	4	7	5	14	20	−6

==== Results by round ====
Round	1	2	3	4	5	6	7	8	9	10	11	12	13	14	15	16	17	18	19	20	21	22	23	24	25	26	27	28	29	30	31	32
Ground	A	H	A	H	A	A	H	A	H	A	H	H	A	H	A	H	H	A	H	A	H	A	A	H	A	A	H	H	A	H	H	A
Result	D	W	D	W	L	L	W	D	D	W	L	L	W	W	D	D	W	D	D	W	D	D	L	D	L	W	W	D	L	D	L	D
Position	6	4	4	3	3	3	4	5	4	3	3	7	5	5	4	4	4	5	4	3	4	2	3	5	6	3	2	4	4	4	5	5

A = Away; H = Home; W = Win; D = Draw; L = Loss

==== Matches ====
24 July 1991 1	Bayer Uerdingen	1–1	Hannover 96	Krefeld
20:00	Paßlack 80'	Report	Wójcicki 12'	Stadium: Grotenburg-Stadion; Attendance: 8,000; Referee: Eugen Strigel

3 August 1991 2	Hannover 96	2–1	VfL Osnabrück	Hanover
15:30	Kretzschmar 34'; Weiland 87'	Report	Wollitz 89'	Stadium: Niedersachsenstadion; Attendance: 8,245; Referee: Hans Fux

10 August 1991 3	Blau-Weiß Berlin	1–1	Hannover 96	Berlin
15:30	Deffke 46'	Report	Steubing 73'	Stadium: Olympiastadion; Attendance: 3,297; Referee: Roland Schäfer

14 August 1991 4	Hannover 96	2–0	FC Remscheid	Hanover
20:00	Surmann 66'; Breitenreiter 88'	Report		Stadium: Niedersachsenstadion; Attendance: 6,000; Referee: Frank Fleske

21 August 1991 7	Hannover 96	1–0	FC St. Pauli	Hanover
20:00	Groth 6'	Report		Stadium: Niedersachsenstadion; Attendance: 25,000; Referee: Hans-Peter Best

24 August 1991 5	VfB Oldenburg	3–2	Hannover 96	Oldenburg
15:30	Wawrzyniak 34'; Drulak 47'; Steinbach 90'	Report	Surmann 23'; Groth 82'	Stadium: Marschweg-Stadion; Attendance: 8,000; Referee: Hans-Jürgen Bußhardt

27 August 1991 6	Stahl Brandenburg	3–0	Hannover 96	Brandenburg (Havel)
18:00	Beeck 33'; Voß 55'; Grether 70'	Report		Stadium: Stadion am Quenz; Attendance: 3,731; Referee: Frank Kiefer

8 September 1991 8	SV Meppen	1–1	Hannover 96	Meppen
18:00	van der Pütten 17'	Report	Wójcicki 84'	Stadium: Hindenburgstadion; Attendance: 12,000; Referee: Kurt Witke

15 September 1991 9	Hannover 96	2–2	Hertha BSC	Hanover
15:00	Grün 26'; Friedemann 88'	Report	Lünsmann 27'; Rath 41'	Stadium: Niedersachsenstadion; Attendance: 11,300; Referee: Karl-Heinz Gläser

21 September 1991 10	Eintracht Braunschweig	1–3	Hannover 96	Braunschweig
15:30	Holze 54'	Report	Friedemann 55', 71'; Groth 74'	Stadium: Eintracht-Stadion; Attendance: 9,011; Referee: Peter Richmann

27 September 1991 11	Hannover 96	0–1	Fortuna Köln	Hanover
20:00		Report	Neuschäfer 19'	Stadium: Niedersachsenstadion; Attendance: 6,500; Referee: Wieland Ziller

4 October 1991 12	Hannover 96	1–3	Bayer Uerdingen	Hanover
20:00	Surmann 87'	Report	Laeßig 67', 82'; Timofte 90+2'	Stadium: Niedersachsenstadion; Attendance: 6,233; Referee: Dieter Birlenbach

11 October 1991 13	VfL Osnabrück	0–1	Hannover 96	Osnabrück
20:00		Report	Grün 70'	Stadium: Osnatel-Arena; Attendance: 5,000; Referee: Peter Mölm

19 October 1991 14	Hannover 96	2–0	Blau-Weiß Berlin	Hanover
15:30	Jursch 4'; Weiland 69'	Report		Stadium: Niedersachsenstadion; Attendance: 6,115; Referee: Günther Frey

27 October 1991 15	FC Remscheid	0–0	Hannover 96	Remscheid
15:00		Report		Stadium: Röntgen-Stadion; Attendance: 3,000; Referee: Manfred Lehnart

2 November 1991 16	Hannover 96	2–2	VfB Oldenburg	Hanover
15:30	Grün 8', 40'	Report	Rusyayev 24'; da Palma 44'	Stadium: Niedersachsenstadion; Attendance: 6,136; Referee: Peter Weise

9 November 1991 17	Hannover 96	1–0	Stahl Brandenburg	Hanover
15:30	Jursch 25'	Report		Stadium: Niedersachsenstadion; Attendance: 4,300; Referee: Leonhard Kentsch

15 November 1991 18	FC St. Pauli	0–0	Hannover 96	Hamburg
20:00		Report		Stadium: Wilhelm-Koch-Stadion; Attendance: 18,650; Referee: Norbert Brückner

23 November 1991 19	Hannover 96	1–1	SV Meppen	Hanover
15:30	Wójcicki 4'	Report	Dragutinović 36'	Stadium: Niedersachsenstadion; Attendance: 6,000; Referee: Reinhard Kuhne

30 November 1991 20	Hertha BSC	0–1	Hannover 96	Berlin
15:30		Report	Klütz 74'	Stadium: Olympiastadion; Attendance: 4,057; Referee: Siegbert Rubel

8 December 1991 21	Hannover 96	1–1	Eintracht Braunschweig	Hanover
14:00	Surmann 80' (pen.)	Report	Probst 64'	Stadium: Niedersachsenstadion; Attendance: 10,488; Referee: Lutz Pohlmann

15 December 1991 22	Fortuna Köln	0–0	Hannover 96	Cologne
14:00		Report		Stadium: Südstadion; Attendance: 800; Referee: Roland Schäfer

8 March 1992 23	SV Meppen	3–0	Hannover 96	Meppen
15:00	Marell 17'; Bujan 55'; Heuermann 71'	Report		Stadium: Hindenburgstadion; Attendance: 7,000; Referee: Frank Kiefer

14 March 1992 24	Hannover 96	1–1	VfB Oldenburg	Hanover
15:30	Sundermann 36'	Report	Steinbach 43'	Stadium: Niedersachsenstadion; Attendance: 5,000; Referee: Reinhard Kuhne

20 March 1992 25	Bayer Uerdingen	1–0	Hannover 96	Krefeld
20:00	Bittengel 75'	Report		Stadium: Grotenburg-Stadion; Attendance: 7,000; Referee: Volkmar Fischer

27 March 1992 26	FC St. Pauli	0–3	Hannover 96	Hamburg
20:00		Report	Klütz 64'; Koch 73', 85'	Stadium: Wilhelm-Koch-Stadion; Attendance: 14,092; Referee: Thomas Leimert

4 April 1992 27	Hannover 96	2–1	Hertha BSC	Hanover
15:30	Freund 66'; Kretzschmar 70'	Report	Iliev 30'	Stadium: Niedersachsenstadion; Attendance: 6,900; Referee: Manfred Schmidt

16 April 1992 28	Hannover 96	1–1	SV Meppen	Hanover
20:00	Wójcicki 57' (pen.)	Report	Menke 50'	Stadium: Niedersachsenstadion; Attendance: 7,534; Referee: Bodo Brandt-Chollé

26 April 1992 29	VfB Oldenburg	5–0	Hannover 96	Oldenburg
15:00	Claaßen 2', 21'; Drulák 57', 72', 85'	Report		Stadium: Marschweg-Stadion; Attendance: 12,000; Referee: Jürgen Jansen

2 May 1992 30	Hannover 96	1–1	Bayer Uerdingen	Hanover
15:30	Wójcicki 88' (pen.)	Report	Laeßig 84'	Stadium: Niedersachsenstadion; Attendance: 4,200; Referee: Helmut Fleischer

10 May 1992 31	Hannover 96	0–2	FC St. Pauli	Hanover
15:00		Report	Sailer 78'; Ottens 90'	Stadium: Niedersachsenstadion; Attendance: 3,000; Referee: Jürgen Wippermann

17 May 1992 32	Hertha BSC	1–1	Hannover 96	Berlin
15:00	Kretschmer 3'	Report	Koch 58'	Stadium: Olympiastadion; Attendance: 2,307; Referee: Kurt Witke

=== DFB-Pokal ===
27 July 1991 First round	NSC Marathon	0–7	Hannover 96	Berlin
15:30		Report	Wójcicki 39'; Groth 41', 69', 77'; Kretzschmar 56', 67'; Sundermann 72'	Stadium: Hertzbergplatz; Attendance: 900; Referee: Frank Fleske

17 August 1991 Second round	VfL Bochum	2–3	Hannover 96	Bochum
15:30	Bonan 15'; Wójcicki 38' (o.g.)	Report	Steubing 18'; Weiland 30'; Surmann 35'	Stadium: Ruhrstadion; Attendance: 5,000; Referee: Hans Fux

4 September 1991 Third round	Borussia Dortmund	2–3	Hannover 96	Dortmund
20:00	Schmidt 20'; Chapuisat 28'	Report	Grün 71'; Breitenreiter 82'; Klütz 89'	Stadium: Westfalenstadion; Attendance: 14,100; Referee: Manfred Schmidt

24 September 1991 Round of 16	Hannover 96	1–0	Bayer Uerdingen	Hanover
20:00	Grün 38'	Report		Stadium: Niedersachsenstadion; Attendance: 18,600; Referee: Hellmut Krug

30 October 1991 Quarter-final	Hannover 96	1–0	Karlsruher SC	Hanover
20:00	Kuhlmey 70'	Report		Stadium: Niedersachsenstadion; Attendance: 28,000; Referee: Lothar Löwer

8 April 1992 Semi-final	Hannover 96	1–1 (a.e.t.) (6–5 p)	Werder Bremen	Hanover
20:15	Koch 95'	Report	Bratseth 97'	Stadium: Niedersachsenstadion; Attendance: 57,000; Referee: Günther Habermann
	Penalties
	Đelmaš (penalty scored); Surmann (penalty missed); Wójcicki (penalty scored); Sirocks (penalty scored); Freund (penalty scored); Schjønberg (penalty scored); Sievers (penalty scored)		(penalty scored) Kohn; (penalty scored) Rufer; (penalty missed) Bratseth; (penalty scored) Legat; (penalty scored) Borowka; (penalty scored) Wolter; (penalty missed) Bode

==== Final ====
23 May 1992
18:00 CEST

Hannover 96	0–0 (a.e.t.)	Borussia Mönchengladbach
	Report
Penalties
Đelmaš (penalty scored); Wójcicki (penalty scored); Freund (penalty missed); Kretzschmar (penalty scored); Schjønberg (penalty scored)	4–3	(penalty scored) Kastenmaier; (penalty scored) Criens; (penalty missed) Pflipsen; (penalty missed) Fach; (penalty scored) Neun

Olympiastadion, Berlin
Attendance: 76,200
Referee: Bernd Heynemann

Hannover 96	Borussia Mönchengladbach

GK	1	(Germany) Jörg Sievers
SW	6	(Poland) Roman Wójcicki
CB	2	(Germany) Jörg-Uwe Klütz	Booked
CB	3	(Germany) Axel Sundermann
CB	4	(Germany) Bernd Heemsoth		(substituted off) 119'
RM	5	(Germany) Jörg Kretzschmar
CM	10	(Germany) Karsten Surmann (c)
CM	8	(Germany) Oliver Freund
LM	7	(Denmark) Michael Schjønberg
CF	11	(Germany) Michael Koch		(substituted off) 68'
CF	9	(Federal Republic of Yugoslavia) Miloš Đelmaš	Booked
Substitutes:
DF	14	(Germany) Mathias Kuhlmey		(substituted on) 119'
FW	15	(Germany) Uwe Jursch		(substituted on) 68'
Manager:
(Germany) Michael Lorkowski

GK	1	(Germany) Uwe Kamps
SW	3	(Germany) Holger Fach
CB	5	(Germany) Thomas Huschbeck		(substituted off) 46'
CB	4	(Germany) Michael Klinkert
CB	2	(Germany) Thomas Kastenmaier	Booked
RM	8	(Germany) Karlheinz Pflipsen
CM	6	(Germany) Christian Hochstätter	Booked
CM	7	(Germany) Martin Schneider
LM	10	(Germany) Jörg Neun
CF	11	(Germany) Martin Max		(substituted off) 76'
CF	9	(Germany) Hans-Jörg Criens (c)
Substitutes:
DF	15	(Germany) Joachim Stadler		(substituted on) 46'
FW	14	(Sweden) Martin Dahlin		(substituted on) 76'
Manager:
(Germany) Jürgen Gelsdorf

Match rules

- 90 minutes.
- 30 minutes of extra time if necessary.
- Penalty shoot-out if scores still level.
- Maximum of two substitutions.

== Statistics ==
=== Goalscorers ===
Rank	Pos	Name	2. Bundesliga Nord	DFB-Pokal	Total
1	MF	(Germany) Martin Groth	3	3	6
1	FW	(Germany) Patrick Grün	4	2	6
1	DF	(Poland) Roman Wójcicki	5	1	6
4	MF	(Germany) Karsten Surmann	4	1	5
5	FW	(Germany) Michael Koch	3	1	4
5	MF	(Germany) Jörg Kretzschmar	2	2	4
7	MF	(Germany) Jens Friedemann	3	0	3
7	DF	(Germany) Jörg-Uwe Klütz	2	1	3
7	FW	(Germany) Niclas Weiland	2	1	3
10	FW	(Germany) André Breitenreiter	1	1	2
10	FW	(Germany) Uwe Jursch	2	0	2
10	FW	(Germany) Waldemar Steubing	1	1	2
10	DF	(Germany) Axel Sundermann	1	1	2
14	MF	(Germany) Oliver Freund	1	0	1
14	DF	(Germany) Mathias Kuhlmey	0	1	1
Total			34	16	50

=== Clean sheets ===
Rank	Pos	Name	2. Bundesliga Nord	DFB-Pokal	Total
1	GK	(Germany) Jörg Sievers	10	4	14
Total			10	4	14
