= 1992 DFB-Pokal final =

- Match programme cover
- Event: 1991–92 DFB-Pokal
Hannover 96	Borussia Mönchengladbach
0	0
- After extra time Hannover 96 won 4–3 on penalties
- Date: 23 May 1992
- Venue: Olympiastadion, Berlin
- Referee: Bernd Heynemann (Magdeburg)
- Attendance: 76,200

The 1991–92 DFB-Pokal competition came to a close on 23 May 1992 when 1. Bundesliga club Borussia Mönchengladbach played 2. Bundesliga team Hannover 96 at the Olympiastadion in Berlin. Hannover 96 made history as the first, and to date only, club from outside the top division to win the cup when they won 4–3 on penalties. The game had finished goalless after 120 minutes. Hannover qualified for the 1992–93 European Cup Winners' Cup and the 1992 DFB-Supercup.

== Route to the final ==
Borussia Mönchengladbach		Round	Hannover 96
Opponent	Result	1991–92 DFB-Pokal	Opponent	Result
Bye		Round 1	Marathon 1902 Berlin	7–0
SG Wattenscheid 09	2–0	Round 2	VfL Bochum	3–2
SC Jülich 1910	1–0	Round 3	Borussia Dortmund	3–2
SC Fortuna Köln	2–0	Round 4	KFC Uerdingen 05	1–0
Stuttgarter Kickers	2–0	Quarterfinals	Karlsruher SC	1–0
Bayer Leverkusen	2–2 (2–0 p)	Semifinals	SV Werder Bremen	1–1 (4–3 p)

== Match ==
=== Details ===
23 May 1992
18:00 CEST

Hannover 96	0–0 (a.e.t.)	Borussia Mönchengladbach
	Report
Penalties
Đelmaš (penalty scored); Wójcicki (penalty scored); Freund (penalty missed); Kretzschmar (penalty scored); Schjønberg (penalty scored)	4–3	(penalty scored) Kastenmaier; (penalty scored) Criens; (penalty missed) Pflipsen; (penalty missed) Fach; (penalty scored) Neun

Olympiastadion, Berlin
Attendance: 76,200
Referee: Bernd Heynemann (Magdeburg)

Hannover 96	Borussia Mönchengladbach

GK	1	(Germany) Jörg Sievers
SW	6	(Poland) Roman Wójcicki
CB	2	(Germany) Jörg-Uwe Klütz	Booked
CB	3	(Germany) Axel Sundermann
CB	4	(Germany) Bernd Heemsoth		(substituted off) 119'
RM	5	(Germany) Jörg Kretzschmar
CM	10	(Germany) Karsten Surmann (c)
CM	8	(Germany) Oliver Freund
LM	7	(Denmark) Michael Schjønberg
CF	11	(Germany) Michael Koch		(substituted off) 68'
CF	9	(Federal Republic of Yugoslavia) Miloš Đelmaš	Booked
Substitutes:
DF	14	(Germany) Mathias Kuhlmey		(substituted in) 119'
FW	15	(Germany) Uwe Jursch		(substituted in) 68'
Manager:
(Germany) Michael Lorkowski

GK	1	(Germany) Uwe Kamps
SW	3	(Germany) Holger Fach
CB	5	(Germany) Thomas Huschbeck		(substituted off) 46'
CB	4	(Germany) Michael Klinkert
CB	2	(Germany) Thomas Kastenmaier	Booked
RM	8	(Germany) Karlheinz Pflipsen
CM	6	(Germany) Christian Hochstätter	Booked
CM	7	(Germany) Martin Schneider
LM	10	(Germany) Jörg Neun
CF	11	(Germany) Martin Max		(substituted off) 76'
CF	9	(Germany) Hans-Jörg Criens (c)
Substitutes:
DF	15	(Germany) Joachim Stadler		(substituted in) 46'
FW	14	(Sweden) Martin Dahlin		(substituted in) 76'
Manager:
(Germany) Jürgen Gelsdorf

Match rules

- 90 minutes.
- 30 minutes of extra time if necessary.
- Penalty shoot-out if scores still level.
- Maximum of two substitutions.
