= 1991–92 SV Werder Bremen season =

Werder Bremen
1991–92 season
- Manager: Otto Rehhagel
- Bundesliga: 9th
- DFB-Pokal: Semi-final
- European Cup Winners' Cup: Winners
- Top goalscorer: League: Marco Bode (12); All: Marco Bode (15)
- Highest home attendance: 33.000
- Lowest home attendance: 9.000

The 1991–92 SV Werder Bremen season was their 93rd year of existence. They participated in the Bundesliga, DFB-Pokal and the European Cup Winners' Cup. The finished 9th in the Bundesliga. They lost in a shoot-out to Hannover 96 in the semi-finals of the DFB-Pokal and won European Cup Winners' Cup.

== Match results ==
=== Legend ===
Win Draw Loss

=== Bundesliga ===
Match	Date	Time CET	Venue	City	Opponent	Result	Attendance	Werder Bremen goalscorers	League position	Source
1	3 August	15:30	Weserstadion	Bremen	Bayern Munich	1–1	33.000	Rufer 77'	T11	
2	10 August	15:30	Westfalenstadion	Dortmund	Borussia Dortmund	1–2	44.023	Allofs 79'	T14	
3	14 August	20:00	Weserstadion	Bremen	VfB Stuttgart	1–1	18.500	Bode 79'	16	
4	20 August	20:00	Bökelbergstadion	Mönchengladbach	Borussia Mönchengladbach	2–0	20.000	Bode 48'; Neubarth 76'	T9	
5	24 August	15:30	Weserstadion	Bremen	Wattenscheid 09	2–2	13.160	Harttgen 4'; Bode 53'	8	
6	27 August	20:00	Ulrich-Haberland-Stadion	Leverkusen	Bayer Leverkusen	0–0	12.000	No scorer	11	
7	30 August	20:00	Weserstadion	Bremen	MSV Duisburg	5–1	18.300	Bode 10', 76'; Kohn 17'; Gelchen 48' (o.g.); Allofs 88'	7	
8	7 September	15:30	Wildparkstadion	Karlsruhe	Karlsruher SC	1–2	15.000	Rufer 45'	11	
9	14 September	15:30	Neckarstadion	Stuttgart	Stuttgarter Kickers	1–2	8.000	Allofs 17'	14	
10	21 September	15:30	Weserstadion	Bremen	Hansa Rostock	1–0	24.938	Bode 8'	10	
11	28 September	15:30	Rheinstadion	Düsseldorf	Fortuna Düsseldorf	0–0	13.000	No scorer	10	
12	5 October	15:30	Weserstadion	Bremen	Schalke 04	2–1	25.350	Neubarth 36'; Legat 50'	7	
13	12 October	15:30	Rudolf-Harbig-Stadion	Dresden	Dynamo Dresden	1–2	15.000	Neubarth 57'	11	
14	18 October	20:00	Weserstadion	Bremen	VfL Bochum	3–0	12.415	Neubarth 19'; Allofs 21'; Bode 57'	7	
15	26 October	15:30	Müngersdorfer Stadion	Cologne	1. FC Köln	0–5	19.000	No scorer	11	
16	1 November	20:00	Weserstadion	Bremen	1. FC Kaiserslautern	0–2	17.750	No scorer	13	
17	10 November	19:00	Volksparkstadion	Hamburg	Hamburger SV	1–0	20.600	Hermann 22'	10	
18	15 November	20:00	Weserstadion	Bremen	Eintracht Frankfurt	1–0	21.000	Allofs 82'	9	
19	23 November	15:30	Städtisches Stadion	Nuremberg	1. FC Nürnberg	0–1	36.500	No scorer	9	
20	30 November	15:30	Olympic Stadium	Munich	Bayern Munich	4–3	18.000	Rufer 7'; Bode 30'; Kohn 52'; Borowka 85'	6	
21	6 December	20:00	Weserstadion	Bremen	Borussia Dortmund	0–1	17.000	No scorer	9	
22	12 December	15:30	Neckarstadion	Stuttgart	VfB Stuttgart	1–1	18.000	Allofs 65'	9	
23	8 February	15:30	Weserstadion	Bremen	Borussia Mönchengladbach	0–0	15.710	No scorer	9	
24	14 February	20:00	Lohrheidestadion	Bochum	Wattenscheid 09	1–0	7.000	Neubarth 68'	8	
25	21 February	20:00	Weserstadion	Bremen	Bayer Leverkusen	1–1	13.800	Legat 68'	8	
26	28 February	19:30	Wedaustadion	Duisburg	MSV Duisburg	0–0	15.500	No scorer	8	
27	7 March	15:30	Weserstadion	Bremen	Karlsruher SC	0–0	12.100	No scorer	8	
28	13 March	20:00	Weserstadion	Bremen	Stuttgarter Kickers	1–3	10.210	Kohn 78'	8	
29	21 March	15:30	Ostseestadion	Rostock	Hansa Rostock	0–0	12.000	No scorer	8	
30	27 March	20:00	Weserstadion	Bremen	Fortuna Düsseldorf	2–1	9.000	Bode 42', 84'	8	
31	4 April	15:30	Parkstadion	Gelsenkirchen	Schalke 04	0–0	40.100	No scorer	8	
32	11 April	15:30	Weserstadion	Bremen	Dynamo Dresden	2–0	11.000	Bode 42'; Eilts 82'	8	
33	18 April	15:30	Ruhrstadion	Bochum	VfL Bochum	2–2	13.500	Bode 48'; Rufer 69'	8	
34	25 April	15:30	Weserstadion	Bremen	1. FC Köln	1–3	16.000	Kohn 73'	8	
35	28 April	20:00	Fritz-Walter-Stadion	Kaiserslautern	1. FC Kaiserslautern	2–2	38.500	Wolter 44'; Allofs 71'	9	
36	1 May	18:00	Weserstadion	Bremen	Hamburger SV	1–1	20.000	Kohn 21'	8	
37	9 May	15:30	Waldstadion	Frankfurt	Eintracht Frankfurt	2–2	46.000	Rufer 77'; Allofs 79'	9	
38	16 May	15:30	Weserstadion	Bremen	1. FC Nürnberg	1–3	20.776	Kohn 38'	9	

==== Record vs. opponents ====
Opponent	Wins	Draws	Losses	Goals for	Goals against
Bayer Leverkusen	0	2	0	1	1
Bayern Munich	1	1	0	5	4
VfL Bochum	1	1	0	5	2
Borussia Dortmund	0	0	2	1	3
Borussia Mönchengladbach	1	1	0	2	0
MSV Duisburg	1	1	0	5	1
Dynamo Dresden	1	0	1	2	3
Eintracht Frankfurt	1	1	0	3	2
Fortuna Düsseldorf	1	1	0	2	1
Hamburger SV	1	1	0	2	1
Hansa Rostock	1	1	0	1	0
1. FC Kaiserslautern	0	1	1	2	4
Karlsruher SC	0	1	1	1	2
1. FC Köln	0	0	2	1	8
1. FC Nürnberg	0	0	2	1	4
Schalke 04	1	1	0	2	1
VfB Stuttgart	0	2	0	2	2
Stuttgarter Kickers	0	0	2	2	5
Wattenscheid 09	1	1	0	3	2

=== DFB-Pokal ===
17 August 1991 Second round	Werder Bremen	3–1	Hamburger SV	Bremen
	Rufer 3'; Kohn 28', 30'	Match Report	Furtok 7'	Stadium: Weserstadion; Attendance: 19,400; Referee: Werner Föckler (Bad Dürkheim)

3 September 1991 Third round	Fortuna Düsseldorf	1–3	Werder Bremen	Düsseldorf
	Kohn 28'; Allofs 51'; Bockenfeld 59'	Match Report	Schütz 77'	Stadium: Rheinstadion; Attendance: 9,000; Referee: Hermann Albrecht (Kaufbeuren)

24 September 1991 Round of 16	Werder Bremen	4–1	Dynamo Dresden	Bremen
	Neubarth 14', 37'; Kohn 86', 88'	Match Report	Maucksch 5'	Stadium: Weserstadion; Attendance: 11,200; Referee: Werner Föckler (Bad Dürkheim)

3 December 1991 Quarter-final	Werder Bremen	2–0	1. FC Kaiserslautern	Bremen
	Harttgen 17'; Kohn 66' (pen.)	Match Report		Stadium: Weserstadion; Attendance: 20,000; Referee: Klaus-Dieter Stenzel (Forst)

8 April 1992 Semi-final	Hannover 96	1–1 (a.e.t.) (4–3 p)	Werder Bremen	Hanover
	Koch 95'	Match Report	Bratseth 97'	Stadium: Niedersachsenstadion; Attendance: 57,000; Referee: Günther Habermann (Weißensee)
	Penalties
	Djelmas (penalty scored); Surmann (penalty missed); Wojcicki (penalty scored); Sirocks (penalty scored); Sievers (penalty scored)		Kohn (penalty scored); Rufer (penalty scored); Bratseth (penalty missed); Legat (penalty scored); Bode (penalty missed)

=== European Cup Winners' Cup ===
==== Qualification ====
===== First round =====
18 September 1991 1st Leg	FC Bacău	0–6	Werder Bremen	Bacău, Romania
		Match Report	8', 12', 30' Rufer; 63' Bratseth; 79' Votava; 81' Neubarth	Stadium: Stadionul Municipal; Attendance: 22.000; Referee: Martin Macko (Czechoslovakia)

1 October 1991 2nd Leg	Werder Bremen	5–0	FC Bacău	Bremen, Germany
	Kohn 6', 17'; Eilts 9'; Bratseth 66'; Bode 71'	Match Report		Stadium: Weserstadion; Attendance: 3.000; Referee: Alan Kelly (Ireland)

==== Knockout round ====
===== Second round =====
23 October 1991 1st Leg	Werder Bremen	3–2	Ferencvárosi TC	Bremen, Germany
	Neubarth 28', 40'; Allofs 33'	Match Report	35', 73' Lipcsei	Stadium: Weserstadion; Attendance: 7.500; Referee: Syme (Scotland)

6 November 1991 2nd Leg	Ferencvárosi TC	0–1 (2–4 agg.)	Werder Bremen	Budapest, Hungary
		Match Report	48' Bode	Stadium: Stadion Albert Flórián; Attendance: 25.000; Referee: Einar Halle (Norway)

===== Quarter-finals =====
4 March 1992 1st Leg	Werder Bremen	2–1	Galatasaray S.K.	Bremen, Germany
	Kohn 79'; Bester 85'	Match Report	33' Kosecki	Stadium: Weserstadion; Attendance: 30.000; Referee: Michał Listkiewicz (Poland)

18 March 1992 2nd Leg	Galatasaray S.K.	0–0 (1–2 agg.)	Werder Bremen	Istanbul, Turkey
		Match Report		Stadium: Ali Sami Yen Stadium; Attendance: 35.000; Referee: Kim Milton Nielsen (Denmark)

===== Semi-finals =====
1 April 1992 1st Leg	Club Brugge	1–0	Werder Bremen	Bruges, Belgium
	Amokachi 5'	Match Report		Stadium: Jan Breydel Stadium; Attendance: 21.000; Referee: Lube Spassov (Bulgaria)

15 April 1992 Semi-finals	Werder Bremen	2–0 (2–1 agg.)	Club Brugge	Bremen, Germany
	Bode 31'; Bockenfeld 59'	Match Report		Stadium: Weserstadion; Attendance: 35.000; Referee: Howard King (Wales)

===== Final =====
6 May 1992 Final	AS Monaco	0–2	Werder Bremen	Lisbon, Portugal
		Match Report	Allofs 41'; Rufer 55'	Stadium: Estádio da Luz; Attendance: 15,000; Referee: Pietro D'Elia (Italy)

== Player information ==
=== Roster & statistics ===
Sources

- Bundesliga:
- DFB-Pokal:
- Cup Winners' Cup:

Squad Season 1991–92
Roster					Bundesliga		DFB-Pokal		Cup Winners' Cup	
Player	Nat.	Birthday	at Werder since	Previous club	Matches	Goals	Matches	Goal	Matches	Goals
Goalkeepers
Oliver Reck	German	27 February 1965	1985	Kickers Offenbach	32	0	4	0	8	0
Jürgen Rollmann	German	17 October 1966	1988	FSV Frankfurt	7	0	1	0	2	0
Defenders
Manfred Bockenfeld	German	23 July 1960	1989	Waldhof Mannheim	25	0	4	1		
Uli Borowka	German	19 May 1960	1987	Borussia Mönchengladbach	36	1	5	0		
Rune Bratseth	Norwegian	19 March 1961	1987	Rosenborg BK	34	0	5	1		
Jonny Otten	German	31 January 1961	1979	—	13	0	1	0		
Thomas Schaaf	German	30 April 1961	1978	—	18	0	3	0		
Thomas Wolter	German	4 October 1963	1984	—	26	1	2	0		
Gunnar Sauer	German	11 June 1964	1984	—	0	0	0	0		
Midfielders
Marco Bode	German	29 July 1969	1988	VfR Osterode	32	12	4	0		
Dieter Eilts	German	13 December 1964	1984	SV Hage	37	1	5	0		
Uwe Harttgen	German	6 July 1964	1987	—	20	1	4	1		
Günter Hermann	German	5 December 1960	1980	TSV Loccum	24	1	5	0		
Thorsten Legat	German	7 November 1968	1991	VfL Bochum	25	2	4	0		
Miroslav Votava	German	25 April 1956	1985	Atlético Madrid	32	0	3	0		
Lars Unger	German	30 September 1972	1991	—	0	0	0	0		
Andree Wiedener	German	14 March 1970	1989	—	0	0	0	0		
Forwards
Klaus Allofs	German	6 December 1956	1990	Girondins de Bordeaux	32	8	3	1		
Marinus Bester	German	16 January 1969	1990	—	3	0	0	0		
Stefan Kohn	German	9 October 1965	1991	VfL Bochum	27	6	5	6		
Frank Neubarth	German	29 July 1967	1982	—	30	5	2	2		
Wynton Rufer	New Zealander	29 December 1962	1989	Grasshopper Club Zürich	29	5	4	1		
Arie van Lent	German	31 August 1970	1989	Sparta Opheusden	1	0	0	0		
Kay Wenschlag	German	25 February 1970		—	0	0	1	0		

== Coaching staff ==
Position	Staff
Head Coach	(Germany) Otto Rehhagel

Last updated: 1 December 2011
Source: Kicker.de
