= 1995–96 Borussia Mönchengladbach season =

Borussia Mönchengladbach
1995–96 season
- Manager: Bernd Krauss
- Stadium: Bökelbergstadion
- Bundesliga: 4th
- DFB-Pokal: Second round
- Cup Winners' Cup: Quarter-finals
- DFB-Supercup: Runners-up
- Top goalscorer: League: Martin Dahlin (15); All: Martin Dahlin (18)

== Season summary ==
Although technically performing worse than they had the previous season in terms of points (the 1995–96 season was the first to use 3 points for a win), Mönchengladbach rose to fourth in the table. They also failed to retain the DFB-Pokal after elimination in the second round by Bayer Leverkusen, but did compensate with a run to the Cup Winners' Cup quarter-finals. This season was the last season until 2011–12 that Mönchengladbach would finish in the top half of the Bundesliga, let alone qualify for Europe.

== Players ==
=== First team squad ===
Squad at end of season

Note: Flags indicate national team as defined under FIFA eligibility rules; some limited exceptions apply. Players may hold more than one non-FIFA nationality.

No.	Pos.	Nation	Player
1	GK	(Germany) GER	Uwe Kamps
2	DF	(Germany) GER	Thomas Hoersen
3	DF	(Germany) GER	Michael Klinkert
4	DF	(Sweden) SWE	Patrik Andersson
6	MF	(Germany) GER	Jörg Neun
7	MF	(Germany) GER	Karlheinz Pflipsen
8	MF	(Germany) GER	Peter Wynhoff
9	FW	(Sweden) SWE	Martin Dahlin
10	MF	(Germany) GER	Stefan Effenberg
12	FW	(Netherlands) NED	Max Huiberts
13	MF	(Germany) GER	Martin Schneider

No.	Pos.	Nation	Player
14	MF	(Denmark) DEN	Peter Nielsen
15	MF	(Germany) GER	Stephan Schulz-Winge
16	MF	(Germany) GER	Dirk Wolf
17	MF	(Croatia) CRO	Davor Krznarić (Note: Krznarić was born in Berlin, Germany, but also qualified to represent Croatia internationally and represented Croatia at U-21 level.)
18	DF	(Germany) GER	Joachim Stadler
19	DF	(Germany) GER	Thomas Kastenmaier
20	MF	(Germany) GER	Christian Hochstätter
21	MF	(Germany) GER	Michael Sternkopf
22	GK	(Germany) GER	Jörg Kässmann
23	DF	(Germany) GER	Thomas Eichin
24	FW	(Sweden) SWE	Jörgen Pettersson

== Match results ==
=== Legend ===
Win Draw Loss

=== Bundesliga ===
==== League table ====
Pos	Team	Pld	W	D	L	GF	GA	GD	Pts	Qualification or relegation
2	Bayern Munich	34	19	5	10	66	46	+20	62	Qualification to UEFA Cup first round
3	Schalke 04	34	14	14	6	45	36	+9	56	Qualification to UEFA Cup first round
4	Borussia Mönchengladbach	34	15	8	11	52	51	+1	53	Qualification to UEFA Cup first round
5	Hamburger SV	34	12	14	8	52	47	+5	50	Qualification to UEFA Cup first round
6	Hansa Rostock	34	13	10	11	47	43	+4	49	

Source: www.dfb.de
Rules for classification: 1) points; 2) goal difference; 3) number of goals scored.
