= 1992 DFB-Supercup =

German Supercup
- Match programme cover
- Event: DFB-Supercup
VfB Stuttgart	Hannover 96
3	1
- Date: 11 August 1992
- Venue: Niedersachsenstadion, Hanover
- Referee: Gerhard Theobald (Neunkirchen)
- Attendance: 21,200

The 1992 DFB-Supercup, known as the Panasonic DFB-Supercup for sponsorship purposes, was the 6th DFB-Supercup, an annual football match contested by the winners of the previous season's Bundesliga and DFB-Pokal competitions.

The match was played at the Niedersachsenstadion in Hanover, and contested by league champions VfB Stuttgart and cup winners Hannover 96. Stuttgart won the match 3–1 for their first title.

== Teams ==
Team	Qualification	Previous appearances (bold indicates winners)
VfB Stuttgart	1991–92 Bundesliga champions	None
Hannover 96	1991–92 DFB-Pokal winners	None

== Match ==
=== Details ===
11 August 1992
20:15 CEST

VfB Stuttgart	3–1	Hannover 96
Gaudino 30'; Buchwald 42'; Kögl 58'	Report	Koch 3'

Niedersachsenstadion, Hanover
Attendance: 21,200
Referee: Gerhard Theobald (Neunkirchen)

**VfB Stuttgart**	**Hannover 96**

GK	**1**	(Germany) Eike Immel
SW		(Federal Republic of Yugoslavia) Slobodan Dubajić
CB		(Germany) Günther Schäfer	(substituted off) 66'
CB		(Germany) Michael Frontzeck
RWB		(Germany) Thomas Strunz
LWB		(Germany) Ludwig Kögl
CM		(Germany) Guido Buchwald (c)
CM		(Germany) Maurizio Gaudino
AM		(Germany) Andreas Buck
CF		(Germany) André Golke
CF		(Germany) Fritz Walter	(substituted off) 46'
Substitutes:
DF		(Germany) Thomas Schneider	(substituted on) 66'
FW		(Switzerland) Adrian Knup	(substituted on) 46'
Manager:
(Germany) Christoph Daum

GK	**1**	(Germany) Jörg Sievers
SW		(Germany) Matthias Kuhlmey
CB		(Germany) Axel Sundermann (c)
CB		(Germany) Jörg-Uwe Klütz
RWB		(Federal Republic of Yugoslavia) Dejan Raičković
LWB		(Germany) Bernd Heemsoth
RW		(Denmark) Michael Schjønberg	(substituted off) 46'
CM		(Germany) André Sirocks
CM		(Germany) Jörg Kretzschmar
LW		(Germany) Reinhold Mathy
CF		(Germany) Michael Koch	(substituted off) 46'
Substitutes:
MF		(Germany) Reinhold Daschner	(substituted on) 46'
FW		(Bosnia and Herzegovina) Sergej Barbarez	(substituted on) 46'
Manager:
(Germany) Eberhard Vogel

== See also ==
- 1992–93 Bundesliga
- 1992–93 DFB-Pokal
