= 1999–2000 MSV Duisburg season =

MSV Duisburg
1999–2000 season
- Manager: Friedhelm Funkel (until 24 March); Josef Eichkorn (from 24 March)
- Stadium: Wedaustadion
- Bundesliga: 18th (relegated)
- DFB-Pokal: Third round
- UEFA Intertoto Cup: Semi-finals

During the 1999–2000 season, MSV Duisburg played in the 1. Bundesliga, the highest tier of the German football league system.

== Season summary ==
After 3 years of top-half finishes, Duisburg were relegated in last place.

== Players ==
=== First team squad ===
Squad at end of season

No.	Pos.	Nation	Player
2	DF	GER	Thomas Hoersen
3	DF	GER	Dietmar Hirsch
4	DF	GER	Torsten Wohlert
5	DF	POL	Tomasz Hajto
7	MF	GER	Marijan Kovačević
8	MF	GER	Markus Osthoff
10	FW	POL	Piotr Reiss
11	DF	CZE	Pavel Drsek
12	MF	GER	Andreas Voss (on loan from Bayer Leverkusen)
13	FW	GER	Markus Beierle
14	MF	GER	Marcus Wedau
15	MF	GER	Horst Steffen
16	MF	GER	Martin Schneider
17	DF	GER	Thorsten Schramm
18	FW	GER	Uwe Spies

No.	Pos.	Nation	Player
19	MF	GER	Jörg Neun
20	MF	GER	Michael Zeyer
21	MF	GER	Thomas Vana
22	DF	GER	Stefan Emmerling
23	MF	GER	Ralf Keidel
24	DF	GER	Carsten Wolters
25	GK	LTU	Gintaras Staučė
26	GK	GER	Carsten Krämer
27	DF	POL	Peter Schyrba
28	DF	GER	Alexander Bugera (on loan from Bayern Munich)
29	FW	TUR	Sercan Güvenışık
30	GK	GER	Andreas Menger
31	MF	PER	Rainer Torres
32	MF	MAR	Yasser El Hamrouni
33	MF	GER	Mike Büskens

=== Left club during season ===
Note: Flags indicate national team as defined under FIFA eligibility rules; some limited exceptions apply. Players may hold more than one non-FIFA nationality.

No. / Pos. / Nation / Player; 6 / MF / DEN / Stig Tøfting (on loan to AGF)	No. / Pos. / Nation / Player; 9 / FW / DEN / Erik Bo Andersen (on loan to Vejle Boldklub)
