= Eike Immel =

German footballer (born 1960)

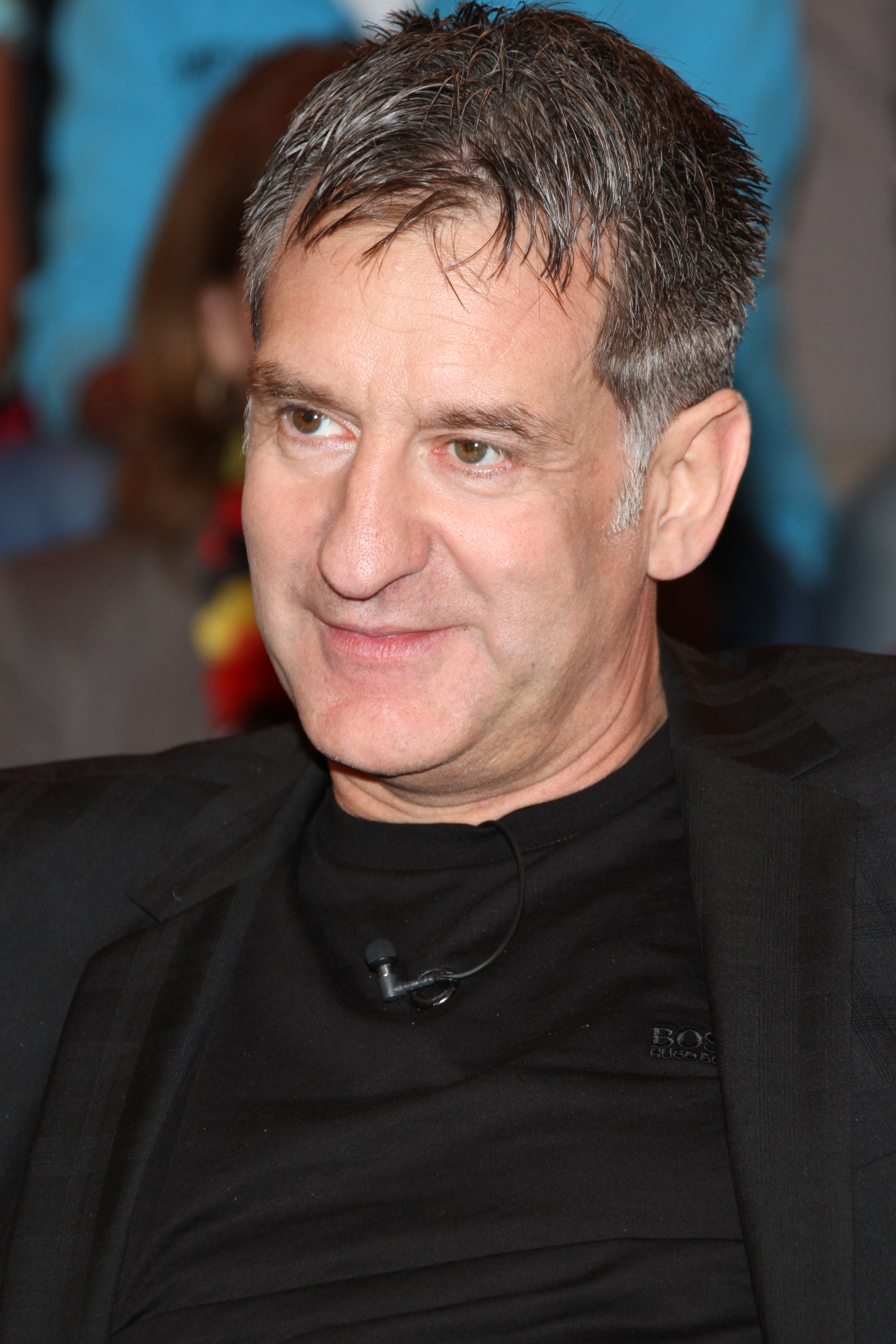
- Immel in 2012

Personal information
- Full name: Eike Heinrich Immel
- Date of birth: 27 November 1960 (age 65)
- Place of birth: Stadtallendorf, West Germany
- Height: 1.87 m (6 ft 2 in)
- Position: Goalkeeper

Senior career*
Years	Team	Apps	(Gls)
1978–1986	Borussia Dortmund	247	(0)
1986–1995	VfB Stuttgart	287	(0)
1995–1997	Manchester City	43	(0)
Total		577	(0)

International career
1975–1976	West Germany U-15	4	(0)
1975–1976	West Germany U-16	5	(0)
1977–1978	West Germany U-18	4	(0)
1979–1986	West Germany U-21	14	(0)
1980–1988	West Germany	19	(0)

Managerial career
- 1998–2001: VfR Heilbronn
Medal record
VfB Stuttgart
Runner-up	UEFA Cup	1989
Winner	Bundesliga	1992
Winner	DFB-Supercup	1992
West Germany
Winner	European Championship	1980
Runner-up	FIFA World Cup	1982
Runner-up	FIFA World Cup	1986
- * Club domestic league appearances and goals

Eike Heinrich Immel (born 27 November 1960) is a German professional football coach and former player who played as a goalkeeper.

From 1975 until 1997, Immel played for Borussia Dortmund, VfB Stuttgart and Manchester City.

He was capped at International level for West Germany and was part of his nations squads for the 1982 FIFA World Cup, 1986 FIFA World Cup, UEFA Euro 1980 and UEFA Euro 1988.

Since retiring he spent three years as manager of VfR Heilbronn before working as a goalkeeping coach for Beşiktaş, Austria Wien and Fenerbahçe. Immel holds the record for 'most goals conceded by a Bundesliga goalkeeper' with 829 goals conceded in 534 games.

== Club career ==
A leading youth international goalkeeper for West Germany in 1978, Eike Immel was still seventeen years of age when he succeeded Horst Bertram as Borussia Dortmund's first-choice. He remained Dortmund's top choice until his two million Deutsche Mark transfer to VfB Stuttgart in 1986, the biggest fee ever paid for a goalkeeper in the history of German football at that time. He served nine years as Stuttgart's regular goalkeeper, winning the Bundesliga title in 1992 and the UEFA Cup runner-up medal in 1989 with them. Afterwards he left for Manchester City, where he retired at the end of the 1996–97 season. He played 534 matches in the German top flight.

== International career ==
His West Germany career lasted for just eight years due to his decision to retire from the West German team following EURO'88. Immel had been the starting goalkeeper since Harald Schumacher's ban from the team in 1987, and his 19th appearance in the semi-final of the 1988 UEFA European Football Championship at Volksparkstadion, Hamburg, remained his final cap for his country and made him miss out on the title winning 1990 FIFA World Cup squad for which Bodo Illgner then served as starting goalkeeper. The mentioned 1988 UEFA European Football Championship was Immel's fifth participation in a big international tournament. He later admitted his decision to retire from the international game at barely 28 just because of the competition from Bodo Illgner for the goalkeeper's jersey, was extremely hasty. He was included in the squad that won the 1980 UEFA European Championship.

== Coaching career ==
Immel joined VfR Heilbronn in 1998 and managed the side until 2001. He has since worked as a goalkeeping coach most notably under Christoph Daum at Fenerbahçe in 2005, having also worked at Beşiktaş and Austria Wien.

== Personal life ==
In January 2008, he was a contestant at Ich bin ein Star – Holt mich hier raus!, the German edition of I'm a Celebrity...Get Me Out of Here!. In 2024 he was declared bankrupt and was reported to be living on benefits and in a council flat.

== Honours ==
VfB Stuttgart

- Bundesliga: 1991–92
- DFL-Supercup: 1992
- UEFA Cup runner-up: 1988–89

West Germany

- UEFA European Championship: 1980
- FIFA World Cup runner-up: 1982, 1986
