= German Association of Towns and Municipalities =

The German Association of Towns and Municipalities (German: Deutscher Städte- und Gemeindebund; DStGB) is a German central organisation of the municipal self-government (Kommunaler Spitzenverband) which represents the interests of 10.000 towns and municipalities belonging to a county (Kreis) in Germany. A similar organisation exists with the Association of German Cities (Deutscher Städtetag), which represents the bigger cities. The DStGB is constituted federally. Its main office is located in Berlin. Current president of the DStGB since January 2023 is Dr. Uwe Brandl, former mayor of the city of Abensberg. Ralph Spiegler, Mayor of VG Niederolm, is the 1. Vicepresident. Honorary president is Roland Schäfer, former mayor of the city of Bergkamen. Secretary General is Dr. André Berghegger, Deputy Secretary General Uwe Zimmermann. The organisation works publicly and releases press statements regarding questions of towns and municipalities in Germany. It did so for example several times in the European migrant crisis.

== History ==
A first association of cities in Germany was founded with the Reichsverband Deutscher Städte (Reich Association of German Cities) in 1909/10, followed by the Reichsverband der Deutschen Landgemeinden (Reich Association of German Rural Municipalities) in 1922. In 1933 these two and further organisations were merged mandatorily in Nazi Germany as Deutscher Gemeindetag (German Municipal Association). In 1945 the organisations were separated again. The German Association of Towns and Municipalities was founded in 1973 as a voluntary association of towns and municipalities. 1991 a European office in Brussels was founded. 1998 the main office moved to Berlin.

== Member associations ==
The association consists of several member associations, namely:

- Bayerischer Gemeindetag
- Gemeinde- und Städtebund Rheinland-Pfalz
- Gemeinde- und Städtebund Thüringen
- Gemeindetag Baden-Württemberg
- Hessischer Städte- und Gemeindebund
- Hessischer Städtetag
- Niedersächsischer Städtetag
- Niedersächsischer Städte- und Gemeindebund
- Saarländischer Städte- und Gemeindetag
- Sächsischer Städte- und Gemeindetag
- Schleswig-Holsteinischer Gemeindetag
- Städte- und Gemeindebund Brandenburg
- Städte- und Gemeindebund Sachsen-Anhalt
- Städte- und Gemeindetag Mecklenburg-Vorpommern
- Städte- und Gemeindebund Nordrhein-Westfalen
- Städtebund Schleswig-Holstein
- Städtetag Rheinland-Pfalz
