= Lüneburger SK =

German football club

- Full name: Lüneburger Sport-Klub von 1901 e.V.
- Founded: 1901
- Dissolved: 2008
- Ground: Wilschenbruch
- Capacity: 7000
- League: defunct
| Home colours | Away colours |

Lüneburger Sport-Klub von 1901 e. V. was one of the oldest and most successful football clubs from the Lüneburg area until it merged with Lüneburger SV in 2008 to become Lüneburger SK Hansa.

== History ==
The club was established on 1 April 1901 as Lüneburger Fußball-Club. Its name was changed to Lüneburger Sport-Klub in 1912. In the season 1951–52, it played in the Oberliga Nord, which was one of the leagues belonging to the highest level in West Germany at the time. In 1992–93, the club qualified for the first round of the DFB-Pokal for the first time. In 2000–01, the club played in the Regionalliga Nord. In 2005–06 the club was second in the Niedersachsen Liga Ost, and missed out on promotion to the Oberliga Nord on goal difference to VSK Osterholz-Scharmbeck. Again in 2006–07, the club was second, this time to TuS Heeslingen. In the club's final season, 2007–08, with Ralf Sievers as trainer, the qualification for the first round of the DFB-Pokal was achieved for the second time, but the new merged club took the place of Lüneburger SK in the DFB-Pokal 2008–09.

== Merger ==
Manfred Harder, the club president and a former Bundesliga referee, merged Lüneburger SK with the football section of Lüneburger SV to form a new club called FC Hansa Lüneburg. The new club took Lüneburger SK's place in both the Oberliga Niedersachsen Ost and in the DFB-Pokal.

== Notable players ==
- Riccardo Baich
- Marinus Bester
- Elard Ostermann
- Patrick Owomoyela
- Jens Scharping
- Sebastian Selke
- Ralf Sievers
- Jan-André Sievers
- Jörg Sievers
- Rainer Zobel
- Hans-Jürgen Ripp

== Honours ==
The club's honours:

- Oberliga Niedersachsen/Bremen
  - Champions: 1998
- Verbandsliga Niedersachsen
  - Champions: 1980
