= Jan-André Sievers =

German footballer

Jan Sievers
Personal information
- Full name: Jan-André Sievers
- Date of birth: 5 August 1987 (age 39)
- Place of birth: Frankfurt am Main, West Germany
- Height: 1.80 m (5 ft 11 in)
- Position: Defender

Team information
- Current team: TuS Hartenholm
- Number: 12

Youth career
- 1999–2004: MTV Treubund Lüneburg
- 2004–2005: Lüneburger SV
- 2005–2006: Hamburger SV

Senior career*
Years	Team	Apps	(Gls)
2006–2007	Hamburger SV II	9	(0)
2007	Lüneburger SK	12	(2)
2008	VfB Lübeck	16	(0)
2008–2009	Kickers Emden	36	(0)
2009–2010	Carl Zeiss Jena	14	(0)
2009–2010	Carl Zeiss Jena II	5	(0)
2010–2012	Sandhausen	31	(0)
2012–2015	Fortuna Köln	69	(1)
2015–2017	VfB Lübeck	50	(0)
2017–2019	NTSV Strand 08	38	(9)
2019–2020	Phönix Lübeck	31	(3)
2020–	TuS Hartenholm	6	(0)
- * Club domestic league appearances and goals as of 3 January 2021

Jan-André Sievers (born 5 August 1987) is a German footballer who plays for TuS Hartenholm.

== Career ==
Born in Frankfurt am Main, Sievers began his career with MTV Treubund Lünerburg, later signing with Lüneburger SV. He joined the Hamburger SV Youth Program in February 2005. In summer 2006 he was promoted to the amateur team and played his first games in the Regionalliga Nord. After only one year, Sievers joined Lüneburger SK. After six months with Lüneburger SK he signed a contract with VfB Lübeck. After another half year, he transferred to Kickers Emden. After the retraction from Kickers Emden out of the 3. Liga, Sievers transferred to FC Carl Zeiss Jena. After one year he left Carl Zeiss Jena and signed for SV Sandhausen on 14 May 2010. Two years later, he signed for SC Fortuna Köln

== Personal life ==
Jan-André is the son of Ralf Sievers and nephew of Jörg Sievers.
