= Dietmar Artzinger-Bolten =

German football chairman (1940–2023)

Dietmar Artzinger-Bolten (23 September 1940 – 4 March 2023) was a German football chairman, lawyer and CDU politician. He was known for his position as President of the football club 1. FC Köln from 1987 to 1991.

== Life and career ==
Artzinger-Bolten originally came from Allenstein in Ostpreußen, but was relocated to Weinheim in 1945. As a teenager he was a supporter of Stuttgarter Kickers and played on the school football team. He graduated in Weinheim in 1960, and also joined the Christian Democratic Union of Germany (CDU) that same year. Artzinger-Bolten, who was deputy federal chairman of the Ring of Christian Democratic Students, began studying Jurisprudence at the Ruprecht-Karls-University in Heidelberg. After three semesters he left Heidelberg and continued his studies in Cologne, then in Bonn. While studying in Köln, Artzinger-Bolten came into contact with 1. FC Köln as a spectator during the home games. Beginning in 1969, he worked as a lawyer. He was a member of the City Council of Cologne from 1975 to 1994 and chaired the Urban Development Committee between 1980 and 1994. From 1975 to 1989, he was a member of the CDU parliamentary group executive committee. From 1989, Artzinger-Bolten was a member of the Board of Directors and the Credit Committee of Stadtsparkasse Köln. From 1986, Artzinger-Bolten was involved in the board of the Kölner Haus- und Grundbesitzerverein of 1888.

From the start of the 1980's, Artzinger-Bolten was the legal advisor to the players of 1. FC Köln. In the winter of 1986–87, 1. FC Köln was in a leadership crisis after serious board quarrels and the resignation announcement of President Peter Weiand for April 1987. During this time, Artzinger-Bolten, who had not yet been represented in FC committees, was proposed as a candidate for the presidency of the club and was elected at an extraordinary general meeting on 3 April 1987. After the election (235:197 votes), Artzinger-Bolten announced that 1. FC Köln should "become a popular club again". Karl-Heinz Thielen, who had previously been regarded as a candidate for the presidency, had been accused by DFB official Egidius Braun of unspecified accusations, which prevented his candidacy to be put forward. The other candidate, Bernhard Worms, did not run because of political obligations, clearing the way for Artzinger-Bolten. This was therefore classified as an "emergency solution". During his four-year tenure, the football club was German runner-up twice, in addition, it reached the semi-final of the 1989–90 UEFA Cup and took part in the 1990–91 DFB-Pokal. During his time as president, the dismissal of coach Christoph Daum occurred during the 1990 FIFA World Cup 1990 in Italy, and the highest transfer sum in Bundesliga history (DM 14.5 million, other sources mention 17 and 18 million respectively) for the sale of Thomas Häßler to Juventus Turin took place. After the dismissal of Christoph Daum, Artzinger-Bolten and his colleagues of the board were subject to insults, which he experienced as a burden to his family. The three-member management committee of 1. FC Köln (Artzinger-Bolten, Jupp Söller, Hans Neukirch) announced its withdrawal on 9 September 1991, which was completed at the general meeting on 21 November 1991. Artzinger-Bolten's administration had been criticised to which he complained of unworthy treatment ("I don't know how someone can continue to volunteer if you are treated this way every day") and he also believed that his law firm's reputation was at risk. He wanted to convert the Bundesliga club into a Joint-stock company and place it into the Exchange (organized market) in 1991–92. At the time of his resignation as president in 1991, the club was heavily in debt. His successor as president to 1. FC Köln was Klaus Hartmann.

Artzinger-Bolten was awarded the Order of Merit of the Federal Republic of Germany at the end of November 1985 in recognition of his social commitment (member of the Lions Clubs International and the Board of Trustees of the Kölner Philharmonie), as well as receiving the Cross of Merit 1. Class of the Order of Merit of the Federal Republic of Germany in November 2004.

Artzinger-Bolten died on 4 March 2023, at the age of 82.
