= Thomas Schneider (footballer) =

German footballer and manager (born 1972)

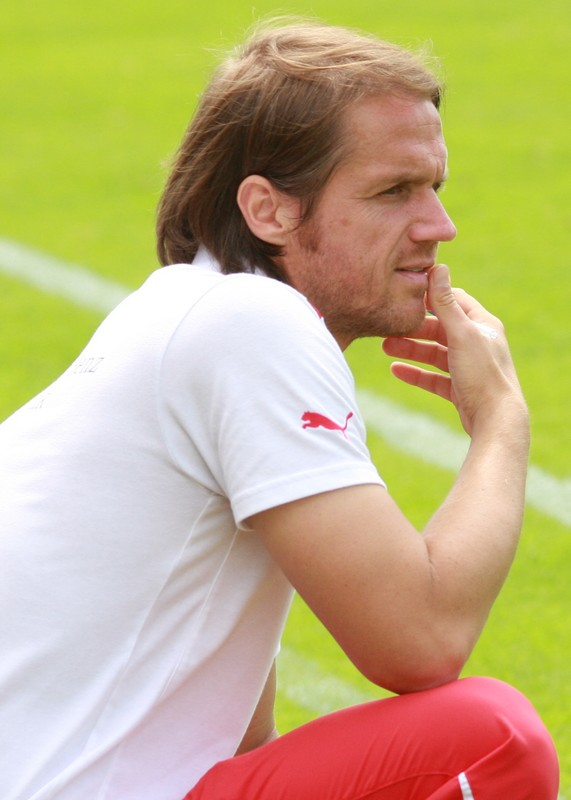
- Schneider in 2013

Personal information
- Full name: Thomas Schneider
- Date of birth: 24 November 1972 (age 53)
- Place of birth: Rheinhausen, West Germany
- Height: 1.84 m (6 ft 0 in)
- Position: Defender

Youth career
- 1979–1983: TSV Höfingen
- 1983–1991: VfB Stuttgart

Senior career*
Years	Team	Apps	(Gls)
1991–1994	VfB Stuttgart II	34	(2)
1991–2003	VfB Stuttgart	133	(7)
2003–2005	Hannover 96	8	(0)
Total		175	(9)

Managerial career
- 2007–2009: FC Dingolfing (youth)
- 2009–2010: FC Dingolfing
- 2011–2013: VfB Stuttgart (youth)
- 2013–2014: VfB Stuttgart
- 2014–2018: Germany (assistant coach)
- * Club domestic league appearances and goals

Thomas Schneider (born 24 November 1972) is a German professional football manager and former player who played as a defender. He was the assistant manager to Joachim Löw for the Germany national team. Schneider had previously been manager of Bundesliga club VfB Stuttgart.

== Playing career ==
Schneider joined VfB Stuttgart as a 10-year-old, and progressed through the youth teams, making his breakthrough in the 1991–92 season. He made two appearances that year, deputising for Uwe Schneider (no relation) as the club won the Bundesliga title. He spent the next couple of years back in Stuttgart's reserve team, and it wasn't until August 1994 that he made his third Bundesliga appearance, when he replaced Marc Kienle in a 2–2 draw with 1. FC Köln at the Gottlieb-Daimler-Stadion. Over the next seven years he established himself as a regular member of Stuttgart's first-team, playing alongside experienced defenders such as Thomas Berthold, Zvonimir Soldo and Frank Verlaat, and such were his performances that he was almost called up to the Germany national team by then coach Berti Vogts. In 1997 Stuttgart won the DFB-Pokal, and Schneider played in the final, replacing Matthias Hagner for the last 20 minutes of the victory over FC Energie Cottbus. The following year he was in the starting line-up for the UEFA Cup Winners' Cup Final, but Stuttgart lost 1–0 to Chelsea.

Injury caused Schneider to miss the entire 2001–02 season, and after only four appearances the following year, he left VfB Stuttgart, after 20 years, to join Hannover 96, then managed by Ralf Rangnick, who had coached him at Stuttgart. He spent two seasons with Hannover, and only made eight appearances, and was forced to retire early in the summer of 2005, due to illness brought on by a tick bite that had been spotted too late.

== Managerial career ==
=== Early career ===
In 2007 Schneider took up the coaching of the under-19 team of Bayernliga side FC Dingolfing, and managed the first-team for the 2009–10 season. After attending the Hennes Weisweiler coaching academy in Cologne, he returned to VfB Stuttgart in 2011, to coach the club's under-17 side.

=== VfB Stuttgart ===
On 26 August 2013, Schneider became the head coach of VfB Stuttgart's first team, replacing Bruno Labbadia, who was on a 3-game losing streak. Schneider was sacked by Stuttgart on 9 March 2014 and replaced by Huub Stevens. Schneider was sacked after a 2–2 draw against Eintracht Braunschweig, who was in last place at the time. However, manager Fredi Bobic was quoted saying that VfB Stuttgart and Schneider will work together again in the future. Prior to the draw, Stuttgart had lost eight consecutive matches. Schneider was the sixth coaching casualty during the 2013–14 season.

=== Germany national team ===
On 2 September 2014, Germany's manager Joachim Löw appointed Schneider as assistant coach, following former assistant Hansi Flick's promotion to sporting director.

=== Coaching record ===
As of 8 March 2014.

Team	From	To	Record					
Team	From	To	G	W	D	L	Win %	Ref.
VfB Stuttgart	26 August 2013	9 March 2014	23	5	6	12	21.74	

== Honours ==
=== Player ===
VfB Stuttgart

- Bundesliga: 1991–92
- DFB-Pokal: 1996–97
- DFB-Supercup: 1992
- UEFA Intertoto Cup: 2000, 2002
