= Hans-Jürgen Ripp =

German footballer (1946–2021)

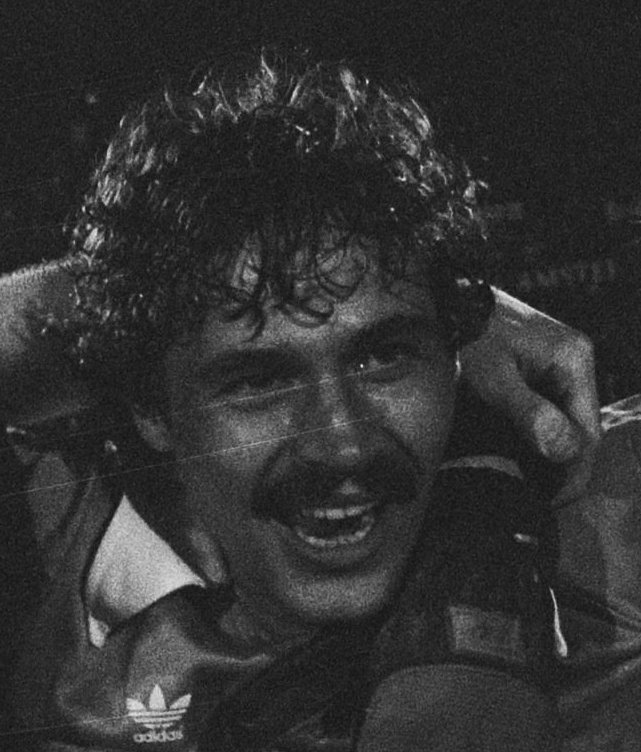
- Hans-Jürgen Ripp (1977)

Personal information
- Date of birth: 24 June 1946
- Place of birth: Hamburg, Germany
- Date of death: 4 July 2021 (aged 75)
- Height: 1.78 m (5 ft 10 in)
- Position: Defender

Senior career*
Years	Team	Apps	(Gls)
1969–1970	SC Vorwärts-Wacker 04		
1970–1979	Hamburger SV	177	(0)
1979–1981	Lüneburger SK		
- * Club domestic league appearances and goals

Hans-Jürgen Ripp (24 June 1946 – 4 July 2021) was a German professional footballer who played as a defender. He spent nine seasons in the Bundesliga with Hamburger SV. In August 2017, he was the player with the fourth most number of Bundesliga appearances without scoring a goal.

== Personal life ==
Ripp was born in Niendorf, Hamburg. His father, Johannes, introduced him to the youth football of Hamburger SV. During his time with the youth teams, he acquired the nickname Ditschi. When he was 18 years old, he married Bärbel.

Following his football career, he worked in the insurance industry. He had two daughters.

== Honours ==
- UEFA Cup Winners' Cup: 1976–77
- Bundesliga: 1978–79; runner-up 1975–76
- DFB-Pokal: 1975–76; runner-up 1973–74
