= 1984 Nehru Cup =

Tournament details
- Host country: India
- Dates: 11–27 January
- Teams: 6 (from 3 confederations)
- Venue: 1 (in 1 host city)

Final positions
- Champions: Poland (1st title)
- Runners-up: China

Tournament statistics
- Matches played: 16
- Goals scored: 29 (1.81 per match)
- Top scorer(s): (Poland) Roman Wójcicki (Argentina) Ricardo Gareca (3 goals each)

The 1984 Nehru Cup was the third edition of the Nehru Cup. It was held between 11 and 27 January 1984 in Calcutta.

== Format ==
A total of 6 teams participated in the tournament through being invited by the All India Football Federation. The tournament would be played in a round-robin style with the top two in the final standings then meeting in a final match to crown the champions.

== Matches ==
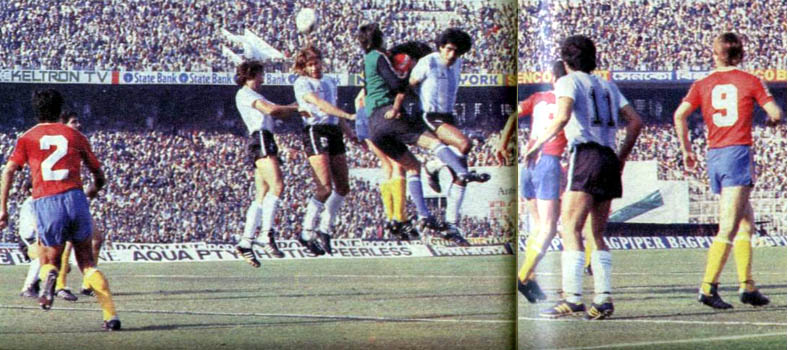
Argentina v Romania at Eden Gardens

Team	Pld	W	D	L	GF	GA	GD	Pts
Poland	5	3	2	0	6	3	+3	8
China	5	3	1	1	7	3	+4	7
Argentina	5	3	1	1	6	2	+4	7
(Hungary) Vasas Budapest	5	1	3	1	5	7	−2	5
Romania U-21	5	0	2	3	3	6	−3	2
India (H)	5	0	1	4	1	7	−6	1

Source: RSSSF
(H) Host
11 January 1984

India	1–2	Poland
Biswajit 42'	Report	Dziekanowski 10'; Pawlak 34'

Eden Gardens
Attendance: 80,000
Referee: Károly Palotai (Hungary)

12 January 1984

Romania U-21	0–1	Argentina
	Report	Burruchaga 11'

Eden Gardens
Referee: Alojzy Jarguz (Poland)

13 January 1984

Vasas Budapest (Hungary)	1–1	China
Kiss 32'	Report	Shusheng 82'

Eden Gardens

14 January 1984

India	0–1	Argentina
	Report	Gareca 79'

Eden Gardens
Referee: Stefan Dan Petrescu (Romania)

15 January 1984

Poland	1–0	China
Adamiec 22'	Report

Salt Lake Stadium
Attendance: 85,000
Referee: Ángel Sánchez (Argentina)

16 January 1984

Vasas Budapest (Hungary)	2–2	Romania U-21
Kiss 31'; Zvara (82/86)	Report	Sertov (49/67); Casuba (65/81)

Eden Gardens
Referee: Melvyn D'Souza (India)

17 January 1984

Poland	1–1	Argentina
Buncol 84'	Report	Jose Ponce 51'

Salt Lake Stadium
Attendance: 80,000
Referee: Károly Palotai (Hungary)

18 January 1984

China	2–1	Romania U-21
Hui 38'; Hongxiang 75'	Report	Sertov 84'

Eden Gardens

19 January 1984

India	0–1	(Hungary) Vasas Budapest
	Report	Hires/Kiss 43'

Eden Gardens

20 January 1984

China	1–0	Argentina
Dayu 86'	Report

Eden Gardens
Referee: Gangadharam Natarajam (India)

21 January 1984

Vasas Budapest (Hungary)	1–1	Poland
Kiss/Balogh 41'	Report	Wojcicki 30'

Eden Gardens
Referee: Soetty (India)

22 January 1984

India	0–0	Romania U-21
	Report

Eden Gardens

24 January 1984

Argentina	3–0	(Hungary) Vasas Budapest
Pecha 8' (o.g.); Gareca 49', 59'	Report

Eden Gardens
Referee: Stefan Dan Petrescu (Romania)

25 January 1984

Poland	1–0	Romania U-21
Wojcicki	Report

Eden Gardens

25 January 1984

India	0–3	China
	Report	Huayun 42', 60'; Xiuquan 81'

Eden Gardens

=== Final ===
27 January 1984

Poland	1–0	China
Wojcicki 60'	Report

Eden Gardens
Attendance: 85,000
Referee: Melvyn D'Souza (India)

== Winners ==
1984 Nehru Cup champion

Poland
First title
