= Günter Hermann =

German footballer (born 1960)

Personal information
- Date of birth: 5 December 1960 (age 65)
- Place of birth: Rehburg, West Germany
- Height: 1.69 m (5 ft 7 in)
- Position: Defensive midfielder

Team information
- Current team: FC Oberneuland (caretaker); FC Oberneuland (sporting director)

Youth career
- RSV Rehburg
- –1979: SC Stadthagen
- 1979–1980: TSV Loccum
- 1980–1982: Werder Bremen

Senior career*
Years	Team	Apps	(Gls)
1982–1992	Werder Bremen	231	(8)
1992–1994	SG Wattenscheid 09	31	(0)
1994–1996	Hannover 96	53	(2)
Total		315	(10)

International career
1988–1990	West Germany	2	(0)

Managerial career
- 1996–1999: Rotenburger SV
- 1999: FC Oberneuland
- 2000–2014: Osterholz-Scharmbeck
- 2014–2015: FC Oberneuland
- 2015: FC Oberneuland (team manager)
- 2015–: FC Oberneuland (sporting director)
- 2017: FC Oberneuland (caretaker)
- * Club domestic league appearances and goals

Günter Hermann (born 5 December 1960) is a German former professional footballer who played as a defensive midfielder, mainly with Werder Bremen.

He was also part of the West Germany national team that was crowned World champion in 1990.

== Club career ==
During nearly ten professional seasons, Hermann played with SV Werder Bremen. He made his Bundesliga debut on 11 December 1982, in a 2–1 win at VfL Bochum, but it would be only his only appearance of the season, and he would also amass a single one in the following.

After a slow start, Hermann became a very important defensive member, often partnering legendary Miroslav Votava in central midfield. In the 1987–88 season, he played in 30 matches (receiving only one yellow card), as Werder won the national championship after 23 years. As his presence was diminishing he still appeared in six matches during the club's 1991–92 Cup Winners' Cup victorious campaign, although he did not play in the final.

In December 1992, Hermann left Bremen after 231 top-flight matches for another first-divisioner, SG Wattenscheid 09 (in Bochum) helping the modest side retain its top level status in his one half season stint. He finished his career in the second division with Hannover 96, retiring at almost 36; he later had a go at managing in amateur football, mainly with VSK Osterholz-Scharmbeck.

== International career ==
Hermann recorded two international caps for West Germany in his professional career, making his debut on 21 September 1988, in a friendly against the Soviet Union (1–0) in Düsseldorf.

His other appearance took place in the final test of the nation ahead of the 1990 FIFA World Cup, playing nine minutes in another 1–0 success, on 30 May, against Denmark. During the final stages, he was the only outfield player besides striker Frank Mill and defender Paul Steiner not to receive a single minute during the competition.

== Honours ==
Werder Bremen

- UEFA Cup Winners' Cup: 1991–92
- Bundesliga: 1987–88
- DFB-Pokal: 1990–91; runners-up 1988–89, 1989–90
- DFL-Supercup: 1988

West Germany

- FIFA World Cup: 1990
