= Christoph Daum =

German football manager (1953–2024)

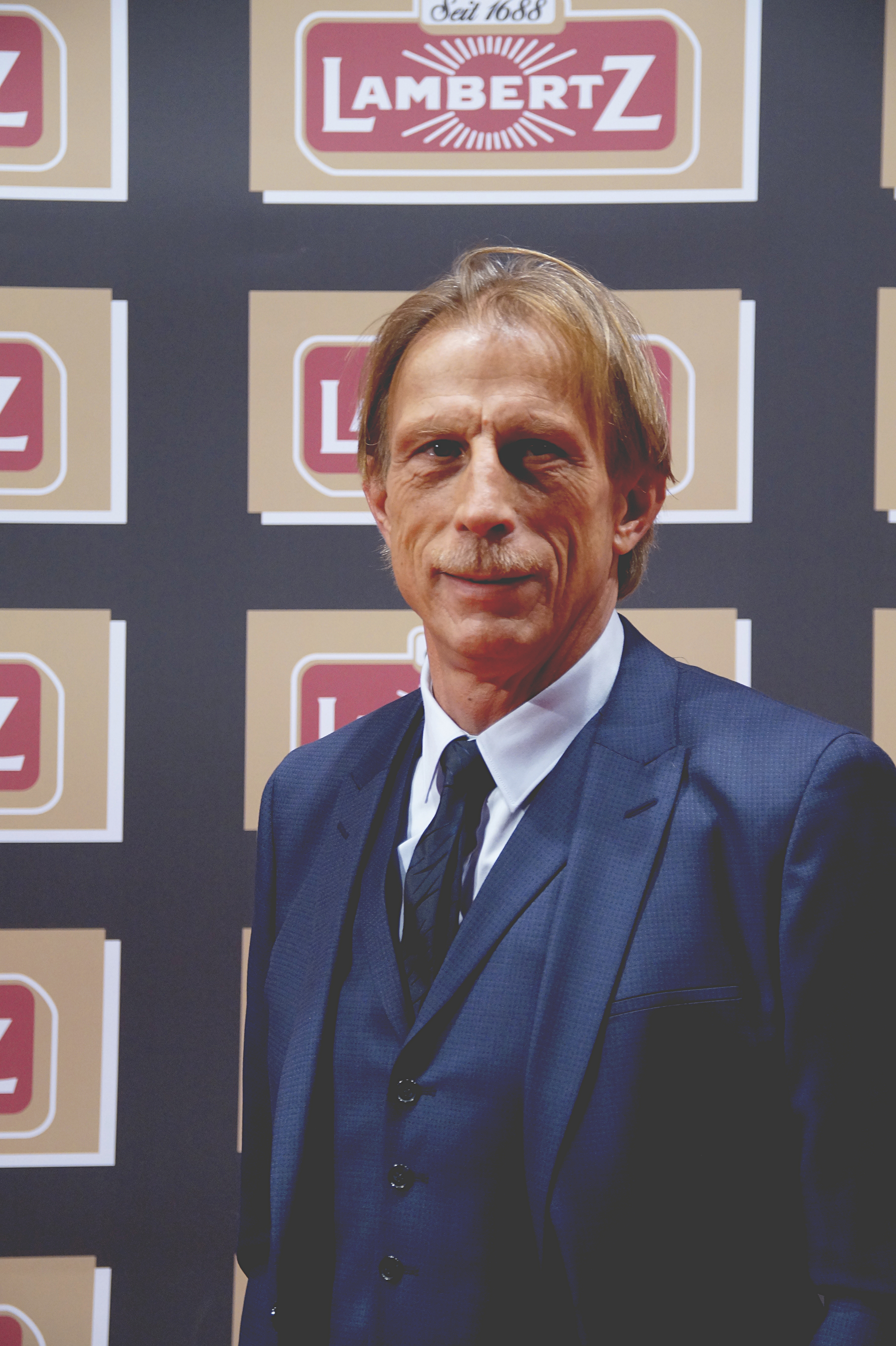
- Daum in 2016

Personal information
- Full name: Christoph Paul Daum
- Date of birth: 24 October 1953
- Place of birth: Zwickau, East Germany
- Date of death: 24 August 2024 (aged 70)
- Place of death: Cologne, Germany
- Height: 1.80 m (5 ft 11 in)
- Position: Midfielder

Youth career
- 1971–1972: Hamborn 07

Senior career*
Years	Team	Apps	(Gls)
1972–1975	Eintracht Duisburg		
1975–1981	1. FC Köln II		

Managerial career
- 1986–1990: 1. FC Köln
- 1990–1993: VfB Stuttgart
- 1994–1996: Beşiktaş
- 1996–2000: Bayer Leverkusen
- 2001–2002: Beşiktaş
- 2002–2003: Austria Wien
- 2003–2006: Fenerbahçe
- 2006–2009: 1. FC Köln
- 2009–2010: Fenerbahçe
- 2011: Eintracht Frankfurt
- 2011–2012: Club Brugge
- 2013–2014: Bursaspor
- 2016–2017: Romania
- * Club domestic league appearances and goals

Christoph Paul Daum (24 October 1953 – 24 August 2024) was a German professional football manager and player. As a manager, he won eight trophies with clubs from Germany, Turkey and Austria. In 1992, he won the Bundesliga championship with VfB Stuttgart. In the Bundesliga, he also led 1. FC Köln to two and Bayer 04 Leverkusen to three second places. He won further national championships with the Turkish clubs Beşiktaş and Fenerbahçe as well as Austria Wien. In 2000, a drug scandal prevented his appointment as German national coach.

== Playing career ==
Daum played as a midfielder and was a junior for several clubs from the region of Duisburg. He began his senior career with Hamborn 07 and Eintracht Duisburg, before joining 1. FC Köln in 1975 and being part of the reserve team that won the 1980–81 German amateur football championship.

== Coaching career ==
=== 1986–1990: 1. FC Köln ===
After finishing his career as a player, Daum earned his coaching licence at the DFB and began working in 1981 as amateur coach with 1. FC Köln. In the 1985–86, season he was promoted to assistant coach and in 1986 to the top position. During the 1990 FIFA World Cup, Daum was released from his position by Köln's president Dietmar Artzinger-Bolten.

=== 1990–1992: Bundesliga win with Stuttgart ===
In November 1990 he transferred to VfB Stuttgart, where he won the Bundesliga in 1992.

In the following season Daum committed a mistake in the first round of the European Cup against Leeds United on 30 September 1992 by illegally putting in a fourth foreign player. A replay was scheduled, which Leeds won. The VfB missed out on the Champions League and Daum was released.

=== 1994–1996: Turkish championship with Beşiktaş ===
Beginning in 1994 Daum worked with the Turkish club Beşiktaş in Istanbul. He won the Turkish Cup in 1994 and 1994–95 Turkish league championship title with Beşiktaş. In the 1995–96 season he was sacked after losses to Kocaelispor and Vanspor.

=== 1996–2000: Bayer Leverkusen, cocaine controversy ===
Daum returned to Germany two years later to coach Bayer Leverkusen in 1996. He was very successful at Bayer Leverkusen, winning three second places in Bundesliga in four years of coaching. During Daum's time, Leverkusen was nicknamed "Vizekusen" (see Neverkusen) because the team narrowly missed out on the Bundesliga championship several times, especially in 2000.

Following the UEFA Euro 2000, Daum was designated to take over the role as manager of the Germany national team the following year. At the same time, the press reported rumours that Daum engaged in "cocaine-fuelled orgies with prostitutes". The pressure grew when Bayern Munich manager Uli Hoeneß publicly claimed that the cocaine rumors against Daum were true. Daum criticized the accusations of Hoeneß and parts of the press, and announced that he would prove his innocence with a hair sample. On 20 October 2000, it became known that the hair sample had tested positive for cocaine use. Daum then resigned from his position at Bayer Leverkusen. Also, his agreement to become national team manager was annulled by the German Football Association on 21 October 2000, and Rudi Völler, the then interim coach, was given the formal job. At first, Daum still claimed that the hairs were not his. One year later, after a period out of the public eye and facing the prospect of jail time, Daum admitted he had used cocaine.

=== 2001–2010: Beşiktaş, Austria Wien, Fenerbahçe, Köln ===
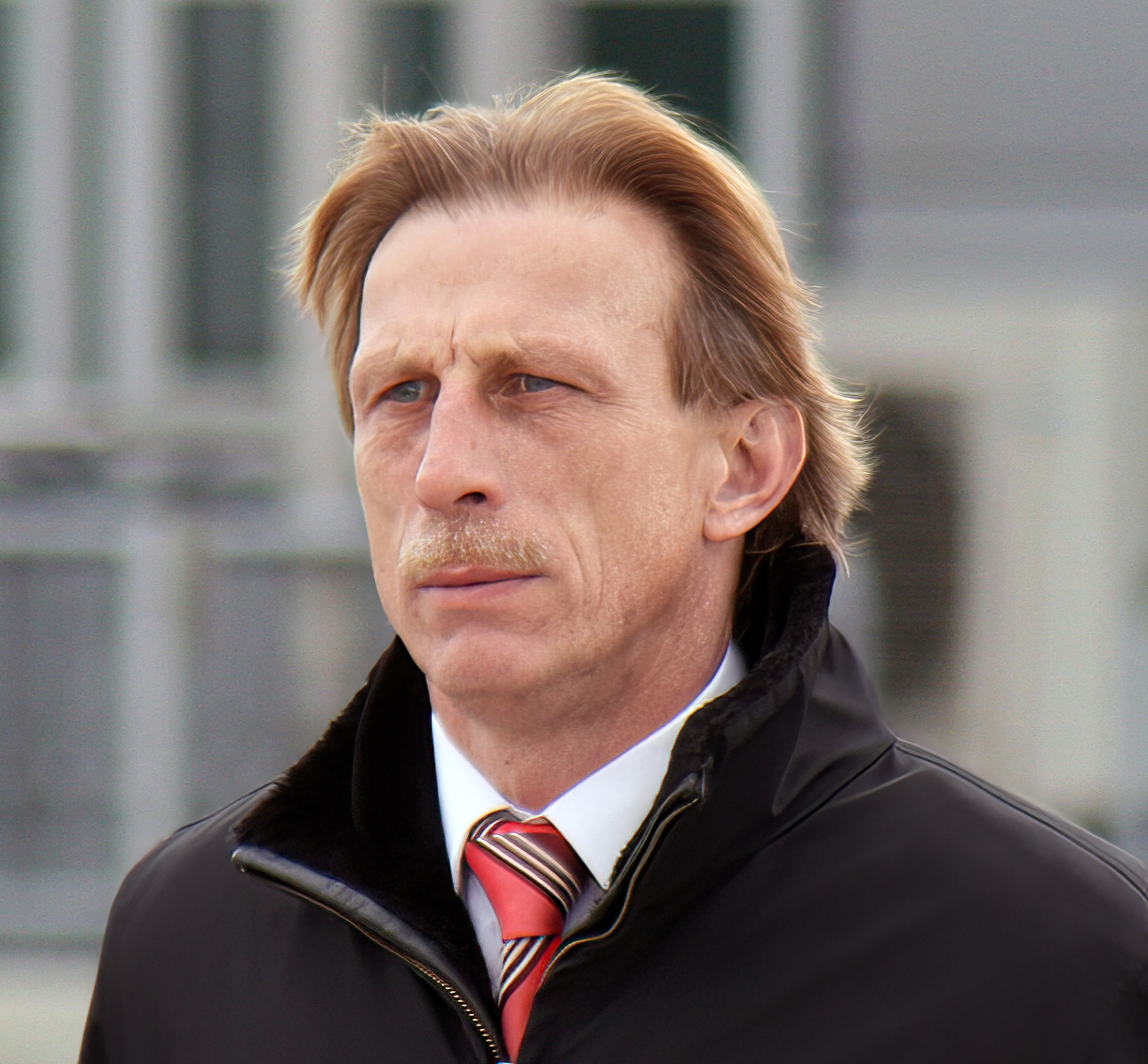
Daum in 2009

As a result of the so-called Daum-Affair he was fired from Bayer Leverkusen and was unable to find a club to work within Germany. While he was still on trial in Germany, he returned to his former team Beşiktaş from March 2001 to May 2002. Afterwards, he moved to Austria Wien on 4 October 2002, where he won another league championship title.

Beginning in July 2003, he was head coach at Fenerbahçe. Daum won two consecutive Turkish league championships in 2004 and 2005. While his failure to succeed in the Champions League was often criticised in the Turkish media, the improvements in Fenerbahçe under his management were significant. At the end of the 2005–06 season Fenerbahçe lost the national championship to their arch-rival Galatasaray on the final week of the league, after which Daum resigned.

Daum signed for 1. FC Köln on 19 November 2006. The contract ran until 2010. Köln returned to Bundesliga after finishing third in the 2007–08 2. Bundesliga. Daum left the club on 2 June 2009.

Daum signed a three-year contract with Fenerbahçe on 2 June 2009. In his one season in charge Daum lost the league title to Bursaspor and the cup final to Trabzonspor. On 25 June 2010, Fenerbahçe parted ways with him.

=== 2011–2014: Frankfurt, Brugge ===
On 22 March 2011, it was confirmed that Daum had signed a contract with Eintracht Frankfurt as coach after the club sacked Michael Skibbe following a decline in the Bundesliga in the second half of season. He left the club on 16 May, two days after the club's relegation was confirmed. Daum took charge of just seven games and failed to manage a victory, his record of three draws and four defeats insufficient to beat the drop.

On 9 November 2011, after pausing for six months, Daum took over as head coach of the Belgian Club Brugge. Starting from a good defensive organisation, Brugge won four domestic matches 1–0 under Daum, and also a 4–3 fight back victory over NK Maribor in the Europa League group stage, after Club Brugge were still down 3–0 17 minutes before time. He led Brugge to the 2nd place in the 2011–12 season. Following the end of the season, he asked Brugge to leave his position as head coach due to his family reasons and the club accepted his decision. On 14 August 2013, Daum took over as head coach of Bursaspor. He was sacked on 24 March 2014.

=== 2016–2017: Romania national team ===
On 7 July 2016, after two years of pause from coaching, Daum started his first experience at a national team after agreeing terms with Romania. He became the third foreign manager in the history to coach the Romanian team. It was reported that he signed a two-year contract which would automatically extend until 2020 if he managed to qualify the team to the 2018 FIFA World Cup. He was sacked in September 2017, after yet another disappointing World Cup qualifying campaign where Romania failed to qualify. He received €135,000 in compensation for his termination.

== Illness and death ==
A long-time smoker, Daum announced that he was diagnosed with lung cancer in October 2022. He died from the disease in Cologne on 24 August 2024 at the age of 70.

== Managerial statistics ==
As of 4 September 2017

Team	From	To	Record					
Team	From	To	G	W	D	L	Win %	Ref.
1. FC Köln	22 September 1986	28 June 1990	154	78	43	33	50.65	
VfB Stuttgart	20 November 1990	10 December 1993	129	57	38	34	44.19	
Beşiktaş	6 January 1994	6 May 1996	98	62	18	18	63.27	
Bayer Leverkusen	1 July 1996	21 October 2000	185	91	57	37	49.19	
Beşiktaş	8 March 2001	30 June 2002	49	26	11	12	53.06	
Austria Wien	4 October 2002	30 June 2003	30	17	4	9	56.67	
Fenerbahçe	1 July 2003	16 June 2006	134	89	18	27	66.42	
1. FC Köln	19 November 2006	2 June 2009	92	36	21	35	39.13	
Fenerbahçe	2 June 2009	25 June 2010	56	36	9	11	64.29	
Eintracht Frankfurt	22 March 2011	16 May 2011	7	0	3	4	0.00	
Club Brugge	9 November 2011	30 June 2012	31	19	3	9	61.29	
Bursaspor	14 August 2013	24 March 2014	34	15	8	11	44.12	
Romania	7 July 2016	14 September 2017	10	3	3	4	30.00	
Total			1,005	530	236	239	52.74	

== Honours ==
=== Player ===
1. FC Köln II

- German amateur football championship: 1980–81

=== Manager ===
VfB Stuttgart

- Bundesliga: 1991–92
- DFL-Supercup: 1992

Beşiktaş

- Süper Lig: 1994–95
- Turkish Cup: 1993–94
- Turkish Super Cup: 1993–94

Austria Wien

- Austrian Football Bundesliga: 2002–03
- Austrian Cup: 2002–03

Fenerbahçe

- Süper Lig: 2003–04, 2004–05
- Turkish Super Cup: 2009

== See also ==
- List of football managers with the most matches
