= Manfred Bockenfeld =

German footballer (born 1960)

Personal information
- Date of birth: 23 July 1960 (age 66)
- Place of birth: Südlohn, West Germany
- Height: 1.84 m (6 ft 0 in)
- Position: Defender

Senior career*
| Years | Team | Apps | (Gls) |
| 1978–1981 | 1. FC Bocholt | | |
| 1981–1987 | Fortuna Düsseldorf | 178 | (20) |
| 1987–1989 | Waldhof Mannheim | 64 | (12) |
| 1989–1994 | Werder Bremen | 94 | (2) |
| 1994–1997 | 1. FC Bocholt | 78 | (12) |

International career
| 1984 | West Germany | 1 | (0) |

Managerial career
- 1996: 1. FC Bocholt
- * Club domestic league appearances and goals

Manfred Bockenfeld (born 23 July 1960) is a German former professional footballer who played as a defender.

== Honours ==
Werder Bremen

- UEFA Cup Winners' Cup: 1991–92
- Bundesliga: 1992–93
