= Michael Schütz (footballer) =

German footballer

Personal information
- Date of birth: 12 December 1966 (age 59)
- Height: 1.77 m (5 ft 10 in)
- Position: Midfielder

Senior career*
Years	Team	Apps	(Gls)
1987–1993	Fortuna Düsseldorf		
1993–1994	Hannover 96		
- * Club domestic league appearances and goals

Michael Schütz (born 12 December 1966) is a retired German football midfielder.
