= Rune Bratseth =

Norwegian footballer (born 1961)

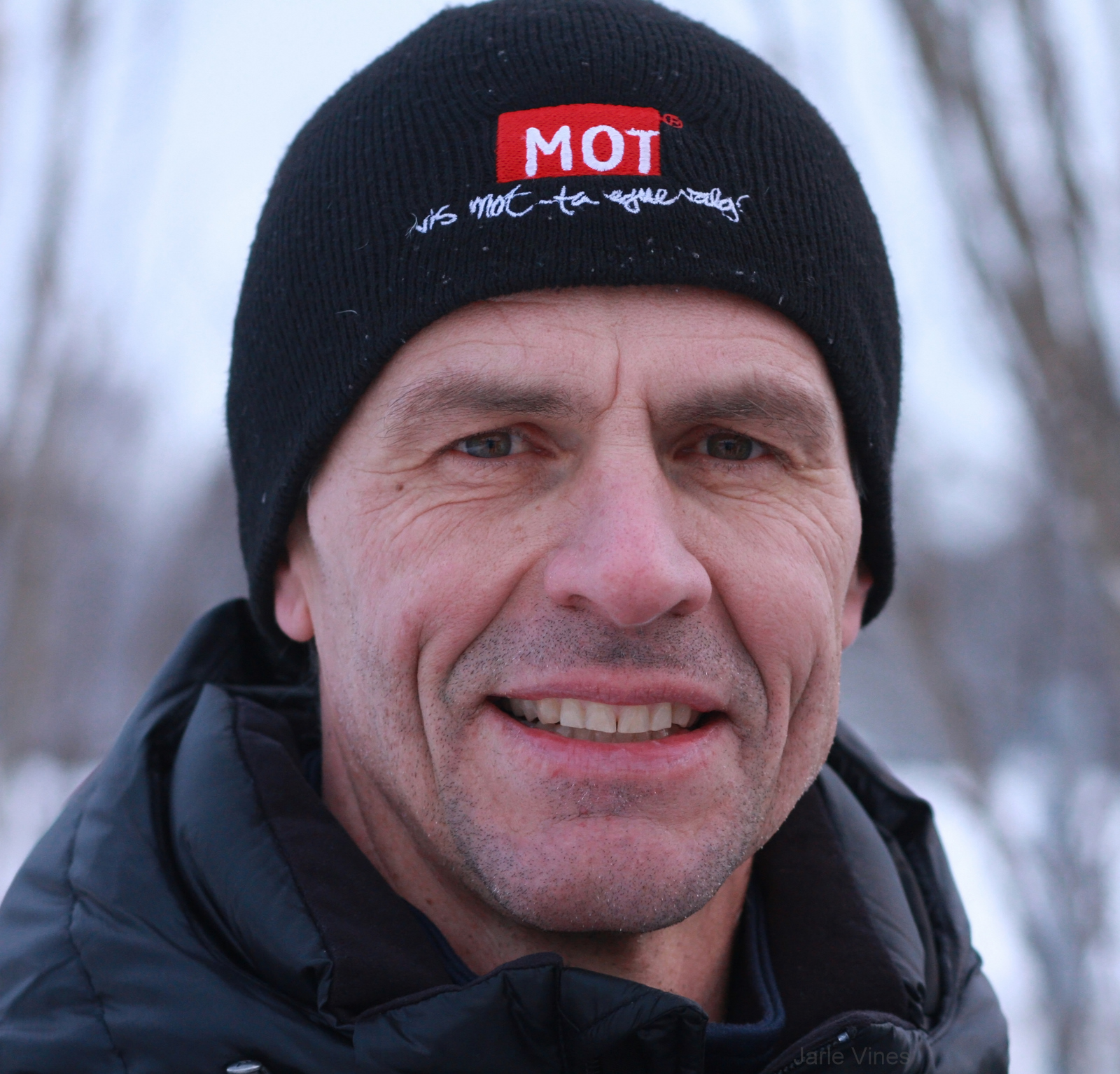
- Bratseth in 2010

Personal information
- Full name: Rune Bratseth
- Date of birth: 19 March 1961 (age 65)
- Place of birth: Trondheim, Norway
- Height: 1.93 m (6 ft 4 in)
- Position: Libero

Youth career
- 1971–1980: Nidelv

Senior career*
Years	Team	Apps	(Gls)
1981–1982	Nidelv		
1983–1986	Rosenborg	83	(2)
1987–1995	Werder Bremen	230	(12)
Total		313	(14)

International career
1986–1994	Norway	60	(4)

Managerial career
- 2006: Rosenborg
- * Club domestic league appearances and goals

Rune Bratseth (born 19 March 1961) is a Norwegian former professional footballer who played as a libero.

Nicknamed Elk due to his stature, he is best known for his spell with Werder Bremen, also having appeared in the 1994 World Cup with Norway.

== Personal life ==
Bratseth was born in Trondheim. His son-in-law is Ingar Bratseth-Kiplesund, Norwegian professional long jumper.

== Club career ==
Bratseth started his career at local club Rosenborg BK. There, he would only be a part-time professional until he left for Germany's Werder Bremen in January 1987, for a mere €93.000. He was immediately cast into the starting XI, making his club debut in a 1–5 loss at 1. FC Nürnberg on 21 February after the winter break; he would also win the first of his two Bundesliga championships in his first full season.

Bratseth's finest moment came when Werder won the UEFA Cup Winners' Cup in 1991–92, in a 2–0 victory against Monaco. During the campaign he played in eight complete matches out of nine, adding two goals (in both legs against Romania's FCM Bacău).

After a second league title with Bremen, Bratseth began suffering knee problems, even needing injections to play. Bratseth retired after playing for Norway in the 1994 World Cup. But after an injury crisis at Bremen he made a comeback for one match in March 1995. Bratseth appeared in 316 games for the Hanseatics all competitions comprised, and scored 20 goals. In the 1993–94 UEFA Champions League, he was on the scoresheet at the incredible 5–3 home win over Anderlecht: the Belgians led 3–0 with 25 minutes to go, and he helped to the final comeback with the 2–3.

Bratseth was named Norway's Golden Player – the best Norwegian footballer of the past 50 years by the Norwegian Football Association, in November 2003, to celebrate UEFA's jubilee. Subsequently he became chairman and general manager of Rosenborg, forming a successful partnership with coach Nils Arne Eggen. The club maintained its Norwegian top division superiority in the following years.

Bratseth was actually registered as a player when he started his job at Rosenborg, and since the club did not have 25 players in its first team squad to be registered for the UEFA Champions League, he was included as a backup. Even though he did not want to play, he agreed to sit on the bench for one game in case of "emergency".

He was clocked at 4,69 seconds on the 40 metres sprint, which is one of the fastest times ran by a Norwegian football player.

== International career ==
Bratseth made his debut in the Norway national team on 26 February 1986, playing the first half of a 2–1 friendly win in Grenada. He was a regular in the following eight years, earning a further 59 caps.

During the 1994 FIFA World Cup, 33-year-old Bratseth was captain of the Norwegian squad. As they exited in the group stage (albeit with four points), their third and last game against Republic of Ireland proved to be his last international.

== Style of play ==
A libero, Bratseth was known for his speed, positional play, offensive strength and cleverness in duels.

== Career statistics ==
=== Club ===
Appearances and goals by club, season and competition
Club	Season	League			Cup		Continental		Other		Total		Ref.
Club	Season	Division	Apps	Goals	Apps	Goals	Apps	Goals	Apps	Goals	Apps	Goals	Ref.
Nidelv	1979						–		–				
Nidelv	1980						–		–				
Nidelv	1981						–		–				
Nidelv	1982						–		–				
Nidelv	Total												–
Rosenborg	1983	1. divisjon	19	1					–		19	1	
Rosenborg	1984	1. divisjon	21	1					–		21	1	
Rosenborg	1985	1. divisjon	21	0					–		21	0	
Rosenborg	1986	1. divisjon	22	0			4	0	–		26	0	
Rosenborg	Total		83	2			4	0			87	2	–
Werder Bremen	1986–87	Bundesliga	17	1	0	0	0	0	0	0	17	1	
Werder Bremen	1987–88	Bundesliga	31	0	6	1	10	0	0	0	47	1	
Werder Bremen	1988–89	Bundesliga	32	5	6	1	6	0	0	0	44	6	
Werder Bremen	1989–90	Bundesliga	29	2	6	0	10	0	0	0	45	2	
Werder Bremen	1990–91	Bundesliga	31	1	7	1	0	0	0	0	38	2	
Werder Bremen	1991–92	Bundesliga	34	0	5	1	8	2	1 (Note: One appearance in DFL-Supercup)	0	48	3	
Werder Bremen	1992–93	Bundesliga	29	5	5	0	4	1	2 (Note: Two appearances in UEFA Super Cup)	0	40	6	
Werder Bremen	1993–94	Bundesliga	26	1	5	0	8	1	0	0	39	2	
Werder Bremen	1994–95	Bundesliga	1	0	0	0	0	0	0	0	1	0	
Werder Bremen	Total		230	15	40	4	46	4	3	0	319	23	–
Career total			313	17	40	4	50	4	3	0	406	25	–

== Honours ==
Rosenborg

- 1. divisjon: 1985

Werder Bremen

- Bundesliga: 1987–88, 1992–93
- DFB-Pokal: 1990–91, 1993–94; runner-up: 1988–89, 1989–90
- European Cup Winners' Cup: 1991–92

Individual

- kicker Bundesliga Team of the Season: 1987–88, 1988–89, 1992–93
- Kniksen Award: Kniksen of the year in 1991, 1992, 1994, Kniksen's honour award in 1994
- UEFA Norwegian Golden Player: 2003
