= Martin Groth =

German footballer

Personal information
- Date of birth: 20 October 1969 (age 57)
- Place of birth: Hanover, West Germany
- Height: 1.85 m (6 ft 1 in)
- Position: Midfielder

Youth career
- SC Langenhagen
- Hannover 96

Senior career*
Years	Team	Apps	(Gls)
1987–1995	Hannover 96	199	(17)
1995–1998	Hansa Rostock	59	(1)
1998–2003	Hamburger SV	79	(10)
2003–2004	VfB Lübeck	26	(0)
Total		363	(28)
- * Club domestic league appearances and goals

Martin Groth (born 20 October 1969 in Hanover) is a German former professional footballer who played as a midfielder.

== Honours ==
Hannover 96

- DFB-Pokal: 1991–92
