= VSK Osterholz-Scharmbeck =

German football club

VSK Osterholz Scharmbeck
- Full name: Verein für Sport und Körperpflege; Osterholz Scharmbeck von 1848 e. V.
- Founded: 1848
- Ground: Waldstadion
- Capacity: 1,500
- Chairman: Reinhard Jordan
- Manager: Günter Hermann
- League: Bezirksliga Lüneburg 3 (VII)
- 2015–16: 9th
Home colours	Away colours

VSK Osterholz Scharmbeck is a German association football club from the district of Osterholz-Scharmbeck in Lower Saxony. The footballers are the most successful group within a sports club that also includes departments for athletics, gymnastics, and handball.

== History ==
The earliest roots of the association go back to the 1848 formation of the gymnastics club Scharmbecker-Osterholzer Turnverein/Scharmbecker Turnerbund in 1848. Other clubs, including Turnverein Gut Heil Osterholz von 1881, Pyramidenclub Osterholz Frisch auf von 1896, and Arbeiter-Turn- und Sportverein Osterholz-Scharmbeck von 1906, became part of VSK over the years.

The football side has its origins in the 1909 establishment of Fußballverein Preußen 09 which was renamed in the 1930s to Sportverein Prussia 09 Osterholz Scharmbeck, and later Spielvereinigung Osterholz-Scharmbeck, vormals Preußen 09. With the onset of World War II the club's activities were suspended as much of the membership left to serve in the armed forces. Following the conflict organizations across the country, including sports and football clubs, were ordered dissolved by the occupying Allied authorities. The club was re-established in February 1946 as Verein für Sport und Körperpflege Osterholz-Scharmbeck.

In the early 1950s and again from the late 1950s through to the early 1960s, the club played in what was then third division football in the Amateurliga Niedersachsen / Staffel VI, with their best result being a second-place finish in 1957. In 1962 turmoil within the club led to the footballers separating to play as 1. FC Osterholz-Scharmbeck, which made its way into the Verbandsliga Nord (IV) in 1974 and immediately claimed a title there. A new football department was quickly established within VSK. In 2006 this side advanced out of the Verbandsliga Niedersachen Ost (V) to play in the fourth tier Oberliga Nord. Nowadays the club plays in the tier seven Bezirksliga Lüneburg.

== Honours ==
The club's honours:

- Landesliga Niedersachen (VI)
  - Champions: 2003
- Verbandsliga Niedersachsen-Ost (V)
  - Champions: 2006
