= Hans-Jörg Criens =

German footballer (1960–2019)

Personal information
- Full name: Hans-Jörg Criens
- Date of birth: 18 December 1960
- Place of birth: Neuss, West Germany
- Date of death: 26 December 2019 (aged 59)
- Height: 1.89 m (6 ft 2 in)
- Position: Striker

Youth career
- –1980: VfR Neuss

Senior career*
| Years | Team | Apps | (Gls) |
| 1980–1993 | Borussia M'gladbach | 290 | (92) |
| 1993–1995 | 1. FC Nürnberg | 24 | (3) |
| Total | | 314 | (95) |

International career
| | West Germany Olympic | 1 | (0) |
- * Club domestic league appearances and goals

Hans-Jörg Criens (18 December 1960 – 26 December 2019) was a German footballer who played as a striker.

He spent most of his 15-year professional career with Borussia Mönchengladbach, amassing Bundesliga totals of 303 games and 94 goals over the course of 12 seasons.

== Club career ==
Born in Neuss, North Rhine-Westphalia, Criens signed with Borussia Mönchengladbach in 1980 from his local club. He only appeared in three Bundesliga games in his first three seasons combined, his debut coming on 4 December 1982 in a 0–3 away loss against 1. FC Kaiserslautern after having come on as a late substitute for Kurt Pinkall; additionally, also from the bench, he appeared in the 1984 final of the DFB-Pokal, coming in for Uwe Rahn and converting his attempt in the shootout, a 6–7 loss against FC Bayern Munich.

Over the following seven campaigns Criens was as essential offensive fixture, initially forming an attacking trio with Rahn and Frank Mill and going on to score in double digits in six of those. Gladbach achieved three consecutive top-four finishes in the league and also reached the semifinals in the 1987 UEFA Cup, with him being club top scorer from 1988 to 1992 in spite of missing most of the latter season due to injury; he captained the side to another domestic cup final in 1992, but it ended in the same fashion, now against Hannover 96.

By the 1993–94 season Criens had fallen down the attacker pecking order, behind Martin Dahlin, Heiko Herrlich and Martin Max, and in October 1993, the 33-year-old signed for 1. FC Nürnberg, suffering team relegation and then playing his last year as a professional in the second division. At the time of his retirement his 92 goals put him third in his main club's all-time scorers list, behind Jupp Heynckes and Herbert Laumen.

== Honours ==
- DFB-Pokal: Runner-up 1983–84, 1991–92
