= Stephan Schulz-Winge =

German footballer

Personal information
- Date of birth: September 13, 1974 (age 52)
- Place of birth: Neuss, West Germany
- Height: 1.90 m (6 ft 3 in)
- Position: Midfielder

Youth career
- SV Glehn
- TSV Norf
- Bayer Uerdingen
- 1. FC Köln

Senior career*
Years	Team	Apps	(Gls)
1992–1997	Borussia Mönchengladbach II		
1995–1997	Borussia Mönchengladbach	3	(0)
1997–1998	FC Homburg		
1998–1999	FC Remscheid		
1999	VfR Neuss		
1999–2005	Borussia Mönchengladbach II		
2002–2004	Borussia Mönchengladbach	4	(0)
2005–2006	KFC Uerdingen 05	5	(0)
2006	1. FC Kleve	15	(0)
2006–2008	TuRU Düsseldorf	41	(1)
- * Club domestic league appearances and goals

Stephan Schulz-Winge (born September 13, 1974) is a German former footballer who played as a midfielder. He spent four seasons in the Bundesliga with Borussia Mönchengladbach.
