= Roland Schäfer =

German lawyer and politician (1949–2026)

Roland Schäfer (29 July 1949 – 1 January 2026) was a German administrative lawyer and local SPD politician. He was the mayor of Bergkamen from 1998 until October 2020.

== Life and career ==
Schäfer was born in Lemgo, Lippe district on 29 July 1949. After graduating from the modern languages branch of the Leopoldinum Gymnasium (Detmold) in 1968, Schäfer studied law at the University of Bielefeld and completed supplementary studies at the German University of Administrative Sciences Speyer.

He was married and had a daughter and a son. Schäfer died on 1 January 2026, at the age of 76, from complications of a cerebral haemorrhage he had suffered four days earlier.
