= Holger Fach =

German footballer and manager (born 1962)

Personal information
- Date of birth: 6 September 1962 (age 64)
- Place of birth: Wuppertal, West Germany
- Height: 1.86 m (6 ft 1 in)
- Position: Midfielder

Youth career
- SV Bayer Wuppertal
- ASV Wuppertal
- Wuppertaler SV
- 1976–1981: Fortuna Düsseldorf

Senior career*
| Years | Team | Apps | (Gls) |
| 1981–1987 | Fortuna Düsseldorf | 164 | (24) |
| 1988–1991 | Bayer Uerdingen | 101 | (27) |
| 1991–1995 | Borussia Mönchengladbach | 102 | (15) |
| 1995–1996 | Bayer Leverkusen | 32 | (3) |
| 1996–1997 | Fortuna Düsseldorf | 24 | (1) |
| 1997 | 1860 Munich | 10 | (0) |
| 1998–1999 | Fortuna Düsseldorf | 10 | (1) |
| Total | | 443 | (71) |

International career
| 1988–1989 | West Germany | 5 | (0) |

Managerial career
- 1999–2000: SV Bayer Wuppertal
- 2001–2003: Borussia M'gladbach II
- 2003: Rot-Weiss Essen
- 2003–2004: Borussia Mönchengladbach
- 2005: VfL Wolfsburg
- 2007–2008: SC Paderborn
- 2008–2009: FC Augsburg
- 2010–2011: Lokomotiv Astana
Medal record
Representing West Germany
Men's Football
| Bronze medal – third place | 1988 Seoul | Team competition |
- * Club domestic league appearances and goals

Holger Fach (born 6 September 1962) is a German football manager and former professional player. Mainly a defensive midfielder, he could also pitch in at centre back.

== Club career ==
Between 1981 and 1998, Fach played 416 Bundesliga games for Fortuna Düsseldorf, Borussia Mönchengladbach, Bayer Uerdingen, Bayer 04 Leverkusen and TSV 1860 Munich. He scored 67 goals during this period, and won the DFB-Pokal with Borussia in 1995. In only half-a-season with Uerdingen in 1987–88, Fach scored a career-best nine league goals, greatly contributing to the side maintaining its top flight status. He retired with Fortuna Düsseldorf in the second division in 1997–98.

== International career ==
During a one-year span, Fach also gained five caps for the national team, his debut coming on 31 August 1988, in a 1990 World Cup qualifier against Finland, in Helsinki (he played the entire match in a 4–0 win). He also represented West Germany at the 1988 Summer Olympics in Seoul, where he played a role in the side winning a Bronze medal scoring 2 goals in the process.

== Coaching career ==
After retiring as a player, Fach was appointed to coach the amateur team at Borussia Mönchengladbach (he worked with the club as a scout the previous year) and after a short intermezzo at Rot-Weiss Essen, on 21 September 2003 he became head coach for the former, leaving his post on October of the following year.

On 5 June 2005, he became the new manager for VfL Wolfsburg, but after a weak first half of the season was fired on 19 December, together with general manager Thomas Strunz.

In January 2007, Fach took the reins of second division outfit SC Paderborn 07 (being fired midway through his second season). On 18 April 2008, he took over as manager of another second-tier side, FC Augsburg. After a disappointing beginning to 2009, FC Augsburg club management passed a vote of confidence in Fach for the remainder of the season, however both sides also agreed to end their cooperation at season's end. On 13 April 2009, he was fired from FC Augsburg along with his assistant coach Dariusz Pasieka. After nine months without a job Fach was named on 25 January 2010 as the new head coach of the Kazakhstani vice-champion Lokomotiv Astana.
