= Thomas Hoersen =

German footballer

Personal information
- Date of birth: 11 January 1972 (age 54)
- Place of birth: Mönchengladbach, West Germany
- Height: 1.85 m (6 ft 1 in)
- Position: Defender

Senior career*
Years	Team	Apps	(Gls)
–1991	Union Rheydt		
1991–1998	Borussia Mönchengladbach	58	(0)
1998–2001	MSV Duisburg	61	(4)
2001–2003	Waldhof Mannheim	47	(1)
2004	Rheydter SV		
2004–2005	Fortuna Düsseldorf	16	(0)
2005–2006	SC Union Nettetal		
2006–2009	SC Kapellen-Erft		
2009–2010	Büchen-Siebeneichener SV		
- * Club domestic league appearances and goals

Thomas Hoersen (born 11 January 1972) is a German retired professional footballer who played as a defender.

== Honours ==
Borussia Mönchengladbach

- DFB-Pokal: 1994–95; runner-up 1991–92
