= Axel Sundermann =

German footballer

Personal information
- Date of birth: 23 January 1968 (age 58)
- Place of birth: Lemgo, West Germany
- Height: 1.79 m (5 ft 10 in)
- Position: Defender

Team information
- Current team: SC Weitmar 45 (manager)

Youth career
- VfL Lieme
- –1987: TBV Lemgo

Senior career*
Years	Team	Apps	(Gls)
1988–1994	Hannover 96	182	(10)
1994–1997	SC Freiburg	66	(3)
1997–2002	VfL Bochum	91	(2)
2002–2004	SC Verl	21	(0)
Total		360	(15)
- * Club domestic league appearances and goals

Axel Sundermann (born 23 January 1968) is a German former professional footballer.

Since 2013, he was appointed manager of SC Weitmar 45.

== Honours ==
Hannover 96

- DFB-Pokal: 1991–92
