= Jörg Kretzschmar =

German footballer

Personal information
- Date of birth: 9 December 1964 (age 61)
- Place of birth: Riesa, East Germany
- Height: 1.76 m (5 ft 9 in)
- Position: Midfielder

Senior career*
Years	Team	Apps	(Gls)
1988–1989	Borussia Mönchengladbach	8	(0)
1989–1990	SV Meppen	30	(0)
1990–1993	Hannover 96	83	(2)
1993–1994	TuS Celle FC		
1994–1995	VfL Herzlake		
1995–1996	SC Paderborn		
1996	Damla Genc Hannover		
1997–2000	1. FC Magdeburg	98	(11)
- * Club domestic league appearances and goals

Jörg Kretzschmar (born 9 December 1964) is a German former professional footballer who played as a midfielder.

== Career ==
Kretzschmar was born in Riesa in the Bezirk Dresden of East Germany and learned his football there. He attempted to leave the Eastern Bloc in 1984 via Bulgaria, but was arrested and imprisoned back in his homeland. A year later, he was allowed to emigrate to West Germany in a prisoner exchange.

He played in the Bundesliga for Borussia Mönchengladbach and in the 2. Bundesliga for SV Meppen and Hannover 96. Kretzschmar was part of the Hannover 96 team that surprisingly won the 1992 DFB-Pokal final against Mönchengladbach. Kretzschmar was one of the successful players in the penalty shoot-out. He played his first Bundesliga match on 20 August 1988 when he was subbed in in Mönchengladbach's win over Werder Bremen. His last professional match as on 30 May 1993 with Hannover 96 against VfB Oldenburg. Altogether, Kretzschmar played 8 Bundesliga matches without scoring and 113 2nd Bundesliga matches, scoring twice. In addition, he appeared in two matches in the European Cup Winners' Cup for Hannover 96. In 1993, he returned to amateur status and only played for amateur clubs. Aside from his football career, he trained as an office management assistant to prepare for the time after his playing career. His last station as a player was 1. FC Magdeburg where he won promotion to the third-tier Regionalliga Nordost in 1997.
