= Roman Wójcicki =

Polish footballer (born 1958)

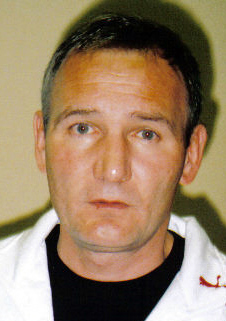
- Wójcicki in 2007

Personal information
- Date of birth: 8 January 1958 (age 68)
- Place of birth: Nysa, Poland
- Height: 1.93 m (6 ft 4 in)
- Position: Defender

Youth career
- –1976: Stal Nysa

Senior career*
| Years | Team | Apps | (Gls) |
| 1976–1980 | Odra Opole | 82 | (8) |
| 1980–1982 | Śląsk Wrocław | 53 | (8) |
| 1982–1986 | Widzew Łódź | 113 | (11) |
| 1986–1989 | FC Homburg | 93 | (15) |
| 1989–1993 | Hannover 96 | 122 | (13) |
| 1993–1995 | TSV Havelse | | |

International career
| 1978–1989 | Poland | 62 | (2) |

Managerial career
- 1993–1995: TSV Havelse (player-manager)
- 1995–1996: SV Damla Genc
- 1996–1997: Werder Hannover (youth)
- 1998: FC Wacker Neustadt (youth)
- 2007–2008: SV Damla Genc
Medal record
Men's football
Representing Poland
FIFA World Cup
| Third place | 1982 Spain |
- * Club domestic league appearances and goals

Roman Wójcicki (born 8 January 1958) is a Polish former professional football manager and player. He played as a defender for clubs including Odra Opole, Śląsk Wrocław, Widzew Łódź, FC Homburg and Hannover 96.

== Playing career ==
Wójcicki was born in Nysa. He played for the Poland national team, making 62 appearances and scoring two goals. He was a participant at the three consecutive World Cups, 1978 FIFA World Cup, 1982 FIFA World Cup, where Poland won the bronze medal and 1986 FIFA World Cup.

He ended his career as a player-manager for TSV Havelse, before coaching various amateur and youth teams in the Hanover Region.

== Career statistics ==
=== International ===
Appearances and goals by national team and year
| National team | Year | Apps | Goals |
|---|---|---|---|
| Poland | 1978 | 2 | 0 |
| Poland | 1979 | 2 | 0 |
| Poland | 1980 | 7 | 0 |
| Poland | 1981 | 1 | 0 |
| Poland | 1982 | 3 | 0 |
| Poland | 1983 | 6 | 0 |
| Poland | 1984 | 11 | 1 |
| Poland | 1985 | 14 | 0 |
| Poland | 1986 | 8 | 0 |
| Poland | 1987 | 3 | 1 |
| Poland | 1988 | 3 | 0 |
| Poland | 1989 | 2 | 0 |
| Total | | 62 | 2 |

Scores and results list Poland's goal tally first, score column indicates score after each Wójcicki goal.

List of international goals scored by Roman Wójcicki
| No. | Date | Venue | Opponent | Score | Result | Competition |
|---|---|---|---|---|---|---|
| 1 | 27 January 1984 | Kolkata, India | China | 1–0 | 1–0 | 1984 Nehru Cup |
| 2 | 17 May 1987 | Budapest, Hungary | Hungary | 3–4 | 3–5 | UEFA Euro 1988 qualifying |

== Honours ==
Odra Opole

- Polish League Cup: 1977

Widzew Łódź

- Polish Cup: 1984–85

Hannover 96

- DFB-Pokal: 1991–92

Poland

- FIFA World Cup bronze medal: 1982
- Nehru Cup: 1984
