= Jörg-Uwe Klütz =

German footballer

Personal information
- Date of birth: 27 July 1968
- Height: 1.88 m (6 ft 2 in)
- Position: Defender

Senior career*
Years	Team	Apps	(Gls)
–1989	VfL Herzlake		
1989–1996	Hannover 96		
1996–1999	VfB Oldenburg		
1999–2008	BV Cloppenburg		

Managerial career
- 2005–2008: BV Cloppenburg (assistant)
- 2008: BV Cloppenburg
- 2008: BV Cloppenburg (assistant)
- 2009–2015: BV Cloppenburg
- 2015: BV Cloppenburg
- * Club domestic league appearances and goals

Jörg-Uwe Klütz (born 27 July 1968) is a German former football player and later manager. As a player, he played as a defender.
