= Karlheinz Pflipsen =

German footballer (born 1970)

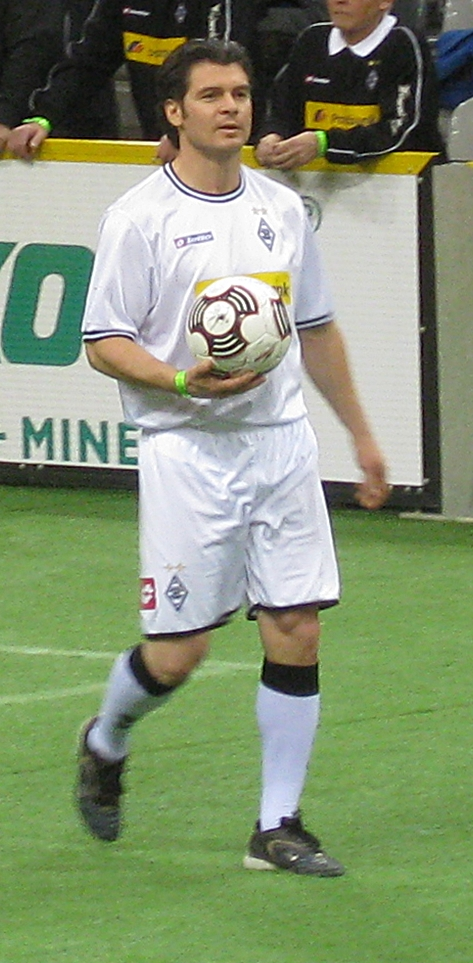
- Pflipsen in 2011

Personal information
- Date of birth: 31 October 1970 (age 55)
- Place of birth: Mönchengladbach, West Germany
- Height: 1.71 m (5 ft 7 in)
- Position: Midfielder

Youth career
- SC Rheindalen
- 1983–1989: Borussia Mönchengladbach

Senior career*
Years	Team	Apps	(Gls)
1989–1999	Borussia Mönchengladbach	197	(37)
1999–2001	Panathinaikos	19	(8)
2001–2004	Alemannia Aachen	68	(10)
2004–2005	1860 Munich	9	(1)
Total		293	(56)

International career
1990–1992	Germany U-21	9	(0)
1993	Germany	1	(0)

Managerial career
- 2008–2009: Rot-Weiß Essen II
- * Club domestic league appearances and goals

Karlheinz Pflipsen (born 31 October 1970) is a German former professional footballer who played as a midfielder.

== Club career ==
A playmaker, Pflipsen played the first decade of his career at hometown club Borussia Mönchengladbach, alongside stars like Martin Dahlin and Stefan Effenberg, winning the German Cup in 1995. In 1992–93, he netted a career-best ten Bundesliga goals (the squad's best with Dahlin).

After Borussia's relegation in 1998–99, Pflipsen was signed by Greek club Panathinaikos, and his talent became evident from the beginning. In a 1999–2000 UEFA Cup match against Deportivo de La Coruña, Pflipsen sustained a cruciate ligament injury in his left knee (he had already suffered the same injury on his right) and missed most of his first season. After recovering, he returned to Germany to play for Alemannia Aachen and TSV 1860 Munich, both in the second division, and retired at almost 35.

In 2008, Pflipsen started his managerial career, joining Rot-Weiß Essen II.

== International career ==
Pflipsen collected one cap for Germany, on 13 June 1993 against the USA, a match in the 1993 U.S. Cup that Germany won 4–3. He came on as a substitute for Jürgen Klinsmann, wearing the number 13.

== Honours ==
Borussia Mönchengladbach

- DFB-Pokal: 1994–95; runner-up 1991–92

Alemannia Aachen

- DFB-Pokal: runner-up 2003–04
