= Jörg Neun =

German footballer

Personal information
- Date of birth: 7 May 1966 (age 60)
- Place of birth: Ortenberg, Hesse, West Germany
- Height: 1.80 m (5 ft 11 in)
- Positions: Midfielder; defender

Youth career
- TSG Bleichenbach

Senior career*
Years	Team	Apps	(Gls)
1984–1985	Kickers Offenbach	35	(0)
1985	1. FC Nürnberg	6	(1)
1985–1986	Fortuna Köln	18	(1)
1986–1987	Waldhof Mannheim	48	(2)
1987–1997	Borussia Mönchengladbach	257	(12)
1997–2001	MSV Duisburg	49	(3)
Total		413	(19)

International career
1985–1987	West Germany U-21	13	(1)
- * Club domestic league appearances and goals

Jörg Neun (born 7 May 1966 in Ortenberg, Hesse) is a German former professional footballer who played as a midfielder or defender.

== Honours ==
Borussia Mönchengladbach

- DFB-Pokal: 1994–95; runners-up 1991–92, 1997–98
