= Martin Schneider (footballer) =

German footballer

Personal information
- Date of birth: 24 November 1968 (age 57)
- Place of birth: Schweinfurt, West Germany
- Position: Midfielder

Team information
- Current team: DJK Schweinfurt

Youth career
- DJK Schweinfurt

Senior career*
Years	Team	Apps	(Gls)
1986–1987	Bayern Munich (A)		
1987–1990	1. FC Nürnberg	90	(2)
1990–1999	Borussia Mönchengladbach	266	(8)
1999–2001	MSV Duisburg	23	(0)
2001–2002	1. FC Schweinfurt 05	7	(0)
2002–2003	TSV Gerbrunn		
2003–2005	1. FC Frickenhausen		
2005–present	DJK Schweinfurt		

International career
	West Germany U-21	8	(1)
Medal record
Men's football
Representing West Germany
FIFA U-16 World Championship
Runner-up	1985 China
- * Club domestic league appearances and goals

Martin Schneider (born 24 November 1968 in Schweinfurt) is a German former footballer who played as a midfielder.

== Honours ==
Borussia Mönchengladbach

- DFB-Pokal winner: 1995; runner-up 1992.
