= Michael Koch (footballer) =

German footballer

Personal information
- Date of birth: 27 September 1969 (age 57)
- Height: 1.80 m (5 ft 11 in)

Senior career*
Years	Team	Apps	(Gls)
1989–1990	Altona 93		
1990–1991	Hamburger SV		
1991–1993	Hannover 96		
1993–1994	Stuttgarter Kickers		
1994–1998	Lübeck		
1998–2004	Schönberg 95		
- * Club domestic league appearances and goals

Michael Koch (born 27 September 1969) is a German former professional footballer who played as a midfielder.
