= Jörg Sievers =

German footballer (born 1965)

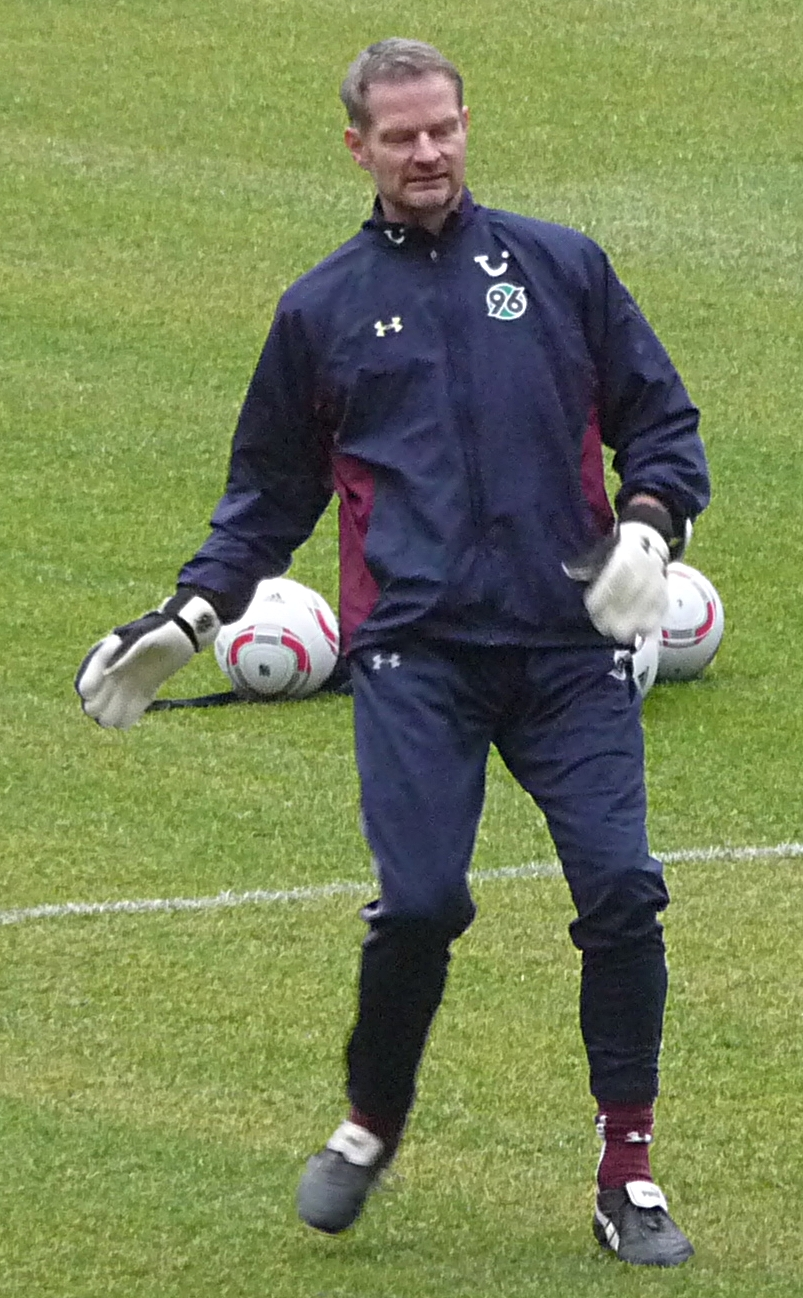
- Sievers in 2011

Personal information
- Date of birth: 22 September 1965 (age 61)
- Place of birth: Römstedt, West Germany
- Height: 1.85 m (6 ft 1 in)
- Position: Goalkeeper

Team information
- Current team: Heart of Midlothian (Assistant Manager)

Youth career
- SV Eddelstorf
- Lüneburger SK
- VfL Wolfsburg

Senior career*
Years	Team	Apps	(Gls)
1989–2003	Hannover 96	384	(0)
2010	Hannover 96	0	(0)

Managerial career
- 2003–2020: Hannover 96 (goalkeeping coach)
- 2020: Heart of Midlothian (assistant)
- 2021: Nancy (assistant)
- * Club domestic league appearances and goals

Jörg Sievers (born 22 September 1965) is a German football coach and former player. A goalkeeper, he spent his entire career with Hannover 96.

== Playing career ==
Sievers was in Römstedt, West Germany. He played for Hannover 96 for more than 10 years, and made a club record 384 league appearances, primarily playing in the 2. Bundesliga. He remained with the club through relegation to the Regionalliga and eventually played out his final season in the Bundesliga in 2002. His main career highlight with the club was perhaps winning the 1991–92 DFB-Pokal against Borussia Mönchengladbach, where he saved two crucial penalties during the shootout. On 6 March 2010, he made a comeback with the reserve team of Hannover 96.

== Coaching career ==
In January 2020, Sievers joined up with Daniel Stendel at Heart of Midlothian working as an assistant manager. The duo left in June 2020. A year later, in June 2021, Sievers once again joined up with Stendel, this time at French club Nancy.

== Honours ==
Hannover 96

- DFB-Pokal: 1991–92

== Trivia ==
- He is also known from the song "Jörg Sievers Blues" by the German band Fury in the Slaughterhouse.
- His elder brother Ralf (a midfielder) also played professional football at Eintracht Frankfurt and FC St. Pauli.
- His nickname amongst fans and within the team is "Colt" Sievers, stemming from the phonetic resemblance of his last name to the main character of the 80s TV action series The Fall Guy, "Colt Seavers"
