= 1992–93 Dynamo Dresden season =

Dynamo Dresden
1992–93 season
- Manager: Klaus Sammer (to April 21); Ralf Minge (from April 21)
- Bundesliga: 15th
- DFB-Pokal: Round 2
- Top goalscorer: League: Uwe Jähnig (5); All: Uwe Jähnig (6)

The 1992–93 season was Dynamo Dresden's third season in the Bundesliga, and they finished in 15th place, just above the relegation zone. Although Dynamo were never in the relegation places at any point during the season, they were let down by a lack of goals - they were the division's lowest scorers with 32, and no player managed more than six goals all season. This situation was probably not helped by the departure of last season's top scorer Torsten Gütschow to Galatasaray, midway through the season, although one positive was the emergence of future-UEFA Champions League winner Alexander Zickler, one of a number of youth team products promoted to the first team this season.

Dynamo reached the second round of the DFB-Pokal, being eliminated by VfB Leipzig of the 2. Bundesliga in a Saxony derby.

== Squad ==
Note: Flags indicate national team as defined under FIFA eligibility rules; some limited exceptions apply. Players may hold more than one non-FIFA nationality.

No.	Pos.	Nation	Player
—	GK	(Germany) GER	René Müller
—	GK	(Germany) GER	Frank Schulze
—	GK	(Germany) GER	Ronny Teuber
—	DF	(Germany) GER	René Beuchel
—	DF	(Germany) GER	René Groth
—	DF	(Germany) GER	Mario Kern
—	DF	(Germany) GER	Matthias Maucksch
—	DF	(Germany) GER	Jens Melzig
—	DF	(Germany) GER	Dirk Oberritter
—	DF	(Germany) GER	Nils Schmäler
—	DF	(Germany) GER	Detlef Schößler
—	DF	(Germany) GER	Andreas Wagenhaus
—	MF	(Germany) GER	Ralf Hauptmann

No.	Pos.	Nation	Player
—	MF	(Germany) GER	Uwe Jähnig
—	MF	(Germany) GER	Sven Kmetsch
—	MF	(Germany) GER	Hans-Uwe Pilz
—	MF	(Germany) GER	Thomas Rath
—	MF	(Federal Republic of Yugoslavia) YUG	Miroslav Stevic
—	MF	(Germany) GER	Jörg Stübner
—	MF	(Germany) GER	Wolfram Wagner
—	MF	(Germany) GER	Dirk Zander
—	FW	(Germany) GER	Torsten Gütschow (to December)
—	FW	(Federal Republic of Yugoslavia) YUG	Vladan Milovanovic
—	FW	(Germany) GER	Sven Ratke
—	FW	(Germany) GER	Alexander Zickler

== Results ==
=== Bundesliga ===
15 August 1992	Eintracht Frankfurt	1–1	Dynamo Dresden	Frankfurt
15:30	Binz 60'	Report	Zander 19'	Stadium: Waldstadion; Attendance: 21,000; Referee: Jürgen F. Wippermann (Bonn)

21 August 1992	Dynamo Dresden	1–1	Hamburger SV	Dresden
20:00	Jähnig 15'	Report	Weichert 84'	Stadium: Rudolf-Harbig-Stadion; Attendance: 18,500; Referee: Karl-Heinz Gläser (Breitungen)

26 August 1992	Dynamo Dresden	3–0	1. FC Köln	Dresden
20:00	Jähnig 34'; Zander 39'; Pilz 72'	Report		Stadium: Rudolf-Harbig-Stadion; Attendance: 16,000; Referee: Michael Malbranc (Hamburg)

29 August 1992	Bayern Munich	3–1	Dynamo Dresden	Munich
15:30	Jorginho 49'; Labbadia 76', 78'	Report	Gütschow 88' (pen.)	Stadium: Olympiastadion; Attendance: 30,000; Referee: Kurt Witke (Mönchzell)

1 September 1992	Dynamo Dresden	2–1	SG Wattenscheid 09	Dresden
20:00	Prinzen 27' (o.g.); Kern 41'	Report	Fink 27'	Stadium: Rudolf-Harbig-Stadion; Attendance: 13,000; Referee: Norbert Haupt (Berlin)

4 September 1992	Borussia Dortmund	3–0	Dynamo Dresden	Dortmund
20:00	Mill 7'; Povlsen 15'; Chapuisat 18'	Report,		Stadium: Westfalenstadion; Attendance: 36,672; Referee: Aron Schmidhuber (Ottobrunn)

18 September 1992	Dynamo Dresden	1–0	Borussia Mönchengladbach	Dresden
20:00	Rath 81'	Report		Stadium: Rudolf-Harbig-Stadion; Attendance: 13,500; Referee: Hartmut Strampe (Handorf)

25 September 1992	1. FC Saarbrücken	1–1	Dynamo Dresden	Saarbrücken
20:00	Kostner 83' (pen.)	Report	Hönerbach 12' (o.g.)	Stadium: Ludwigsparkstadion; Attendance: 20,000; Referee: Karl-Josef Assenmacher (Fischenich)

3 October 1992	Dynamo Dresden	2–3	Werder Bremen	Dresden
15:30	Gütschow 48'; Schößler 88'	Report	Herzog 8'; Beiersdorfer 12'; Bode 83'	Stadium: Rudolf-Harbig-Stadion; Attendance: 14,300; Referee: Georg Dardenne (Nettersheim)

17 October 1992	VfB Stuttgart	4–0	Dynamo Dresden	Stuttgart
15:30	Walter 15' (pen.); Knup 72'; Sverrisson 78', 80'	Report		Stadium: Gottlieb-Daimler-Stadion; Attendance: 19,000; Referee: Peter Mölm (Bremerhaven)

23 October 1992	Dynamo Dresden	1–2	1. FC Nürnberg	Dresden
20:00	Schößler 81' (pen.)	Report,	Olivares 3'; Eckstein 64'	Stadium: Rudolf-Harbig-Stadion; Attendance: 10,000; Referee: Manfred Aust (Cologne)

30 October 1992	Bayer Leverkusen	0–0	Dynamo Dresden	Leverkusen
20:00		Report		Stadium: Ulrich-Haberland-Stadion; Attendance: 12,000; Referee: Eugen Strigel (Horb)

13 November 1992	Dynamo Dresden	3–0	Karlsruher SC	Dresden
20:00	Maucksch 45' (pen.); Rath 71'; Kmetsch 74'	Report		Stadium: Rudolf-Harbig-Stadion; Attendance: 10,000; Referee: Manfred Führer (Steinhagen)

20 November 1992	VfL Bochum	2–2	Dynamo Dresden	Bochum
20:00	Reekers 54'; Dressel 90'	Report	Stevic 19', 36'	Stadium: Ruhrstadion; Attendance: 12,000; Referee: Hermann Albrecht (Kaufbeuren)

27 November 1992	Dynamo Dresden	1–0	Schalke 04	Dresden
20:00	Maucksch 37' (pen.)	Report		Stadium: Rudolf-Harbig-Stadion; Attendance: 19,800; Referee: Rainer Boos (Kronberg)

4 December 1992	Bayer Uerdingen	1–1	Dynamo Dresden	Krefeld
20:00	Gorlukovich 38'	Report	Jähnig 68'	Stadium: Grotenburg-Stadion; Attendance: 9,600; Referee: Hans-Peter Dellwing (Trier)

12 December 1992	Dynamo Dresden	1–3	1. FC Kaiserslautern	Dresden
15:30	Jähnig 22'	Report	Witeczek 8', 41'; Ritter 90' (pen.)	Stadium: Rudolf-Harbig-Stadion; Attendance: 11,300; Referee: Hellmut Krug (Gelsenkirchen)

20 February 1993	Dynamo Dresden	0–2	Eintracht Frankfurt	Dresden
15:30		Report	Schmitt 53'; Okocha 76'	Stadium: Rudolf-Harbig-Stadion; Attendance: 13,500; Referee: Hartmur Strampe (Handorf)

28 February 1993	Hamburger SV	1–1	Dynamo Dresden	Hamburg
18:00	Furtok 65'	Report	Pilz 42'	Stadium: Volksparkstadion; Attendance: 21,300; Referee: Markus Weber (Bergkamen)

6 March 1993	1. FC Köln	3–1	Dynamo Dresden	Cologne
15:30	Keuler 19'; Sturm 67'; Fuchs 86'	Report	Maucksch 73'	Stadium: Müngersdorfer Stadion; Attendance: 19,000; Referee: Bernd Heynemann (Magdeburg)

13 March 1993	Dynamo Dresden	0–0	Bayern Munich	Dresden
15:30		Report		Stadium: Rudolf-Harbig-Stadion; Attendance: 29,000; Referee: Karl-Josef Assenmacher (Fischenich)

19 March 1993	SG Wattenscheid 09	2–1	Dynamo Dresden	Wattenscheid
15:30	Moser 26'; Tschiskale 44' (pen.)	Report	Ratke 35'	Stadium: Lohrheidestadion; Attendance: 5,500; Referee: Manfred Harder (Lüneburg)

27 March 1993	Dynamo Dresden	3–0	Borussia Dortmund	Dresden
15:30	Jähnig 6'; Zickler 52', 83'	Report		Stadium: Rudolf-Harbig-Stadion; Attendance: 17,100; Referee: Manfred Amerell (Munich)

2 April 1994	Borussia Mönchengladbach	5–1	Dynamo Dresden	Mönchengladbach
15:30	Pflipsen 19', 58', 87'; Hochstätter 54'; Winhoff 62'	Report,		Stadium: Bökelbergstadion; Attendance: 18,305; Referee: Rainer Boos (Kronberg)

10 April 1993	Dynamo Dresden	0–0	1. FC Saarbrücken	Dresden
15:30		Report		Stadium: Rudolf-Harbig-Stadion; Attendance: 16,500; Referee: Hans Joachim-Osmers (Bremen)

16 April 1993	Werder Bremen	3–0	Dynamo Dresden	Bremen
20:00	Legat 21'; Wolter 26'; Beiersdorfer 87'	Report		Stadium: Weserstadion; Attendance: 19,116; Referee: Georg Dardenne (Nettersheim)

24 April 1993	Dynamo Dresden	0–0	VfB Stuttgart	Dresden
15:30		Report		Stadium: Rudolf-Harbig-Stadion; Attendance: 14,500; Referee: Edgar Steinborn (Sinzig)

28 April 1993	1. FC Nürnberg	0–0	Dynamo Dresden	Nuremberg
20:00		Report		Stadium: Frankenstadion; Attendance: 32,373; Referee: Günther Habermann (Weißensee)

1 May 1993	Dynamo Dresden	2–0	Bayer Leverkusen	Dresden
15:30	Schmäler 31'; Zickler 68'	Report		Stadium: Rudolf-Harbig-Stadion; Attendance: 13,800; Referee: Bernd Heyndemann (Magdeburg)

7 April 1993	Karlsruher SC	3–1	Dynamo Dresden	Karlsruhe
20:00	Bender 59'; Nowotny 65'; Melzig 75' (o.g.)	Report	Wagenhaus 77'	Stadium: Wildparkstadion; Attendance: 14,000; Referee: Hans-Jürgen Kasper (Katlenburg)

15 May 1993	Dynamo Dresden	0–0	VfL Bochum	Dresden
15:30		Report		Stadium: Rudolf-Harbig-Stadion; Attendance: 16,700; Referee: Wolf-Günter Wiesel (Ottbergen)

21 May 1993	Schalke 04	2–0	Dynamo Dresden	Gelsenkirchen
15:30	Borodyuk 22'; Müller 77'			Stadium: Parkstadion; Attendance: 31,700; Referee: Hans Scheuerer (Munich)

29 May 1993	Dynamo Dresden	1–1	Bayer Uerdingen	Dresden
15:30	Marschall 31'	Report	Kühn 4'	Stadium: Rudolf-Harbig-Stadion; Attendance: 18,550; Referee: Hans-Joachim Osmers (Bremen)

5 June 1993	1. FC Kaiserslautern	2–0	Dynamo Dresden	Kaiserslautern
15:30	Kadlec 45'; Schäfer 70'	Report		Stadium: Betzenbergstadion; Attendance: 28,257; Referee: Aron Schmidhuber (Ottobrunn)

=== DFB-Pokal ===
18 August 1992 Round 1	1860 Munich	1 – 2	Dynamo Dresden	Munich
19:00	Kneißl 16'	Report (in German)	Kmetsch 32'; Stevic 59'	Attendance: 14,000; Referee: Hans-Peter Best (Kämpfelbach)

12 September 1992 Round 2	Dynamo Dresden	2 – 3	VfB Leipzig	Dresden
19:00	Jähnig 43'; Zander 70'	Report (in German)	Rische 18'; Lindner 42'; Hobsch 79'	Stadium: Rudolf-Harbig-Stadion; Attendance: 5,500; Referee: Markus Merk (Kaiserslautern)

== Transfers ==
=== In ===
Player	From	Date
(Germany) René Beuchel	Dynamo Dresden (A)	Summer
(Germany) René Groth	Dynamo Dresden (A)	Summer
(Federal Republic of Yugoslavia) Vladan Milovanovic	Napredak Kruševac	Summer
(Germany) Dirk Oberritter	Dynamo Dresden (A)	Summer
(Germany) Thomas Rath	Hertha BSC	Summer
(Germany) Nils Schmäler	VfB Stuttgart	Summer
(Federal Republic of Yugoslavia) Miroslav Stevic	Grasshoppers	Summer
(Germany) Wolfram Wagner	Dynamo Dresden (A)	Summer
(Germany) Alexander Zickler	Youth team	Summer

=== Out ===
Player	To	Date
(Germany) Sergio Allievi	SpVgg Unterhaching	Summer
(Germany) Steffen Büttner	1. FC Union Berlin	Summer
(Germany) Frank Lieberam	VfL Wolfsburg	Summer
(Germany) Oliver Pagé	Rot-Weiss Essen	Summer
(Germany) Uwe Rösler	1. FC Nürnberg	Summer
(Germany) Heiko Scholz	Bayer Leverkusen	Summer
(Germany) Torsten Gütschow	Galatasaray	December
