= 1993–94 Dynamo Dresden season =

Dynamo Dresden
1993–94 season
- Manager: Sigfried Held
- Bundesliga: 13th
- DFB-Pokal: Semi-final
- Top goalscorer: League: Olaf Marschall (11); All: Olaf Marschall (13)

The 1993–94 season was Dynamo Dresden's third season in the Bundesliga. They finished in 13th place, to date their best performance since German reunification. After a slow start, they went on a 10 match unbeaten run during the middle of the season, and won three of their last five games to finish well clear of the relegation zone. Dynamo were masters of the 1–0 win, thanks in part to loan signing Marek Penksa (all three of his goals were winners in such matches), and top scorer Olaf Marschall, who'd been signed from Admira Wacker during pre-season.

Dynamo also achieved their best ever result in the DFB-Pokal, beating Bayern Munich and Bayer Leverkusen before bowing out to Werder Bremen in the semi-final.

== Squad ==
Note: Flags indicate national team as defined under FIFA eligibility rules; some limited exceptions apply. Players may hold more than one non-FIFA nationality.

No.	Pos.	Nation	Player
—	GK	(Russia) RUS	Stanislav Cherchesov
—	GK	(Germany) GER	René Müller
—	GK	(Germany) GER	Frank Schulze
—	DF	(Germany) GER	René Beuchel
—	DF	(Germany) GER	René Groth
—	DF	(Germany) GER	Mario Kern
—	DF	(Germany) GER	Matthias Maucksch
—	DF	(Germany) GER	Dirk Oberritter
—	DF	(Denmark) DEN	Henrik Risom (from January)
—	DF	(Germany) GER	Nils Schmäler
—	DF	(Germany) GER	Detlef Schößler
—	DF	(Germany) GER	Andreas Wagenhaus (to September)
—	MF	(Germany) GER	Uwe Jähnig

No.	Pos.	Nation	Player
—	MF	(Germany) GER	Sven Kmetsch
—	MF	(Germany) GER	Markus Kranz
—	MF	(Croatia) CRO	Nikica Maglica
—	MF	(Poland) POL	Piotr Nowak
—	MF	(Czechoslovakia) TCH	Marek Penksa
—	MF	(Germany) GER	Hans-Uwe Pilz
—	MF	(Germany) GER	Thomas Rath
—	MF	(Federal Republic of Yugoslavia) YUG	Miroslav Stevic
—	FW	(Germany) GER	Henri Fuchs
—	FW	(Germany) GER	Olaf Marschall
—	FW	(Germany) GER	Werner Rank
—	FW	(Germany) GER	Sven Ratke
—	FW	(Germany) GER	Uwe Rösler (to March)

== Results ==
=== Bundesliga ===
7 August 1993	VfB Leipzig	3–3	Dynamo Dresden	Leipzig
15:30	Lindner 10'; Anders 17', 25'	Report	Marschall 15', 27', 69'	Stadium: Zentralstadion; Attendance: 31,400; Referee: Manfred Amerell (Munich)

13 August 1993	Dynamo Dresden	0–1	MSV Duisburg	Dresden
20:00		Report	Közle 85' (pen.)	Stadium: Rudolf-Harbig-Stadion; Attendance: 16,200; Referee: Bernd Heynemann (Magdeburg)

22 August 1993	Bayern Munich	5–0	Dynamo Dresden	Munich
15:30	Schupp 32'; Nerlinger 45'; Scholl 47', 56'; Ziege 50'	Report		Stadium: Olympiastadion; Attendance: 28,000; Referee: Alfons Berg (Konz)

28 September 1993	Dynamo Dresden	1–1	SG Wattenscheid 09	Dresden
15:30	Kmetsch 64'	Report	Löbe 9'	Stadium: Rudolf-Harbig-Stadion; Attendance: 9,712; Referee: Michael Malbranc (Hamburg)

1 September 1993	Borussia Dortmund	4–0	Dynamo Dresden	Dortmund
20:00	Chapuisat 37', 71', 90'; Riedle 89'	Report		Stadium: Westfalenstadion; Attendance: 39,000; Referee: Manfred Schmidt

5 September 1993	Dynamo Dresden	1–1	Hamburger SV	Dresden
18:00	Marschall 15'	Report	Von Heesen 44'	Stadium: Rudolf-Harbig-Stadion; Attendance: 10,000; Referee: Aron Schmidhuber (Ottobrunn)

8 September 1993	1. FC Köln	0–1	Dynamo Dresden	Köln
15:30		Report	Jähnig 53'	Stadium: Müngersdorfer Stadion; Attendance: 17,000; Referee: Bernhard Zerr (Ottersweier)

18 September 1993	Dynamo Dresden	2–1	Borussia Mönchengladbach	Dresden
15:30	Pilz 15'; Stevic 72'	Report	Pflipsen 5'	Stadium: Rudolf-Harbig-Stadion; Attendance: 13,900; Referee: Volkmar Fischer (St. Wendel)

24 September 1993	Eintracht Frankfurt	3–2	Dynamo Dresden	Frankfurt
20:00	Andersen 46'; Gaudino 50'; Furtok 69'	Report	Kmetsch 20'; Jähnig 62'	Stadium: Waldstadion; Attendance: 22,000; Referee: Jürgen Jansen (Essen)

1 October 1993	Dynamo Dresden	3–1	1. FC Kaiserslautern	Dresden
15:30	Marschall 1'; Kranz 39'; Schmäler 62'	Report	Kuntz 14'	Stadium: Rudolf-Harbig-Stadion; Attendance: 16,500; Referee: Manfred Führer (Steinhagen)

8 October 1993	1. FC Nürnberg	3–0	Dynamo Dresden	Nuremberg
20:00	Schwabl 6'; Zarate 25'; Köpke 88' (pen.)	Report		Stadium: Frankenstadion; Attendance: 30,400; Referee: Hartmut Strampe (Handorf)

15 October 1993	Dynamo Dresden	1–1	Karlsruher SC	Dresden
20:00	Kahn 28' (o.g.)	Report	Kiriakov 41'	Stadium: Rudolf-Harbig-Stadion; Attendance: 15,500; Referee: Hans-Jürgen Kasper (Katlenburg)

23 October 1993	Schalke 04	0–0	Dynamo Dresden	Gelsenkirchen
15:30		Report		Stadium: Parkstadion; Attendance: 26,230; Referee: Manfred Amerell (Munich)

29 October 1993	Dynamo Dresden	1–2	SC Freiburg	Dresden
20:00	Stevic 58'	Report	Todt 29'; Cardoso 49'	Stadium: Rudolf-Harbig-Stadion; Attendance: 14,100; Referee: Wolf-Günter Wiesel (Ottbergen)

6 November 1993	Dynamo Dresden	1–1	Bayer Leverkusen	Dresden
15:30	Marschall 16'	Report	Kirsten 79'	Stadium: Rudolf-Harbig-Stadion; Attendance: 11,700; Referee: Hermann Albrecht (Kaufbeuren)

12 November 1993	Werder Bremen	0–1	Dynamo Dresden	Bremen
15:30		Report	Penksa 32'	Stadium: Weserstadion; Attendance: 18,047; Referee: Hellmut Krug (Gelsenkirchen)

21 November 1993	Dynamo Dresden	1–0	VfB Stuttgart	Dresden
18:00	Marschall 90'	Report		Stadium: Rudolf-Harbig-Stadion; Attendance: 10,600; Referee: Georg Dardenne (Nettersheim)

26 November 1993	Dynamo Dresden	1–0	VfB Leipzig	Dresden
18:00	Penksa 16'	Report		Stadium: Rudolf-Harbig-Stadion; Attendance: 12,120; Referee: Edgar Steinborn (Sinzig)

5 December 1993	MSV Duisburg	1–1	Dynamo Dresden	Duisburg
15:30	Közle 41'	Report	Piotr Nowak 90'	Stadium: Wedaustadion; Attendance: 19,000; Referee: Aron Schmidhuber (Ottobrunn)

10 December 1993	Dynamo Dresden	1–1	Bayern Munich	Dresden
15:30	Marschall 21'	Report	Labbadia 84'	Stadium: Rudolf-Harbig-Stadion; Attendance: 24,000; Referee: Karl-Josef Assenmacher (Fischenich)

11 February 1994	SG Wattenscheid 09	1–1	Dynamo Dresden	Wattenscheid
15:30	Kern 43' (o.g.)	Report	Marschall 18' (pen.)	Stadium: Lohrheidestadion; Attendance: 5,500; Referee: Hans-Joachim Osmers (Bremen)

18 February 1994	Dynamo Dresden	3–0	Borussia Dortmund	Dresden
15:30	Kranz 31'; Fuchs 59'; Marschall 83'	Report		Stadium: Rudolf-Harbig-Stadion; Attendance: 14,800; Referee: Hans-Peter Best (Kämpfelbach)

26 February 1994	Hamburger SV	1–1	Dynamo Dresden	Hamburg
15:30	Von Heesen 88'	Report	Jähnig 47'	Stadium: Volksparkstadion; Attendance: 18,305; Referee: Manfred Führer (Steinhagen)

4 March 1994	Dynamo Dresden	1–1	1. FC Köln	Dresden
20:00	Nowak 56'	Report	Hauptmann 21'	Stadium: Rudolf-Harbig-Stadion; Attendance: 19,500; Referee: Hans Scheuerer (Munich)

12 March 1994	Borussia Mönchengladbach	2–1	Dynamo Dresden	Mönchengladbach
15:30	Herrlich 12', 41'	Report	Thomas Rath 13'	Stadium: Bökelbergstadion; Attendance: 23,000; Referee: Hans-Peter Dellwing (Trier)

19 March 1994	Dynamo Dresden	0–4	Eintracht Frankfurt	Dresden
15:30		Report	Becker 29'; Gaudino 63'; Yeboah 66'; Falkenmayer 87'	Stadium: Rudolf-Harbig-Stadion; Attendance: 14,100; Referee: Markus Weber (Bergkamen)

25 March 1994	1. FC Kaiserslautern	0–0	Dynamo Dresden	Kaiserslautern
20:00		Report		Stadium: Betzenbergstadion; Attendance: 32,373; Referee: Hellmut Krug (Gelsenkirchen)

31 March 1994	Dynamo Dresden	1–1	1. FC Nürnberg	Dresden
20:00	Matthias Maucksch 56'	Report	Sutter 20'	Stadium: Rudolf-Harbig-Stadion; Attendance: 23,000; Referee: Michael Malbranc (Hamburg)

6 April 1994	Karlsruher SC	1–0	Dynamo Dresden	Karlsruhe
20:00	Bonan 65'	Report		Stadium: Wildparkstadion; Attendance: 20,000; Referee: Edgar Steinborn (Sinzig)

20 May 1995	Dynamo Dresden	1–0	Schalke 04	Dresden
15:30	Penksa 56'	Report		Stadium: Rudolf-Harbig-Stadion; Attendance: 20,100; Referee: Alfons Berg (Konz)

15 April 1994	SC Freiburg	0–1	Dynamo Dresden	Freiburg
15:30		Report	Fuchs 85'	Stadium: Dreisamstadion; Attendance: 15,000; Referee: Aron Schmidhuber (Ottobrunn)

24 April 1994	Bayer Leverkusen	1–1	Dynamo Dresden	Leverkusen
18:00	Paulo Sérgio 54'	Report	Jähnig 76'	Stadium: Ulrich-Haberland-Stadion; Attendance: 16,700; Referee: Bernhard Zerr (Ottersweier)

30 April 1994	Dynamo Dresden	1–0	Werder Bremen	Dresden
15:30	Marschall 66'	Report		Stadium: Rudolf-Harbig-Stadion; Attendance: 25,900; Referee: Günther Habermann (Weißensee)

7 May 1994	VfB Stuttgart	3–0	Dynamo Dresden	Stuttgart
15:30	Walter 6', 35', 83'	Report		Stadium: Gottlieb-Daimler-Stadion; Attendance: 23,000; Referee: Markus Merk (Otterbach)

=== DFB-Pokal ===
24 August 1993 Round 2	Dynamo Dresden	0 – 0 (aet) (4–2 p)	VfL Wolfsburg	Dresden
		Report (in German)		Stadium: Rudolf-Harbig-Stadion; Attendance: 3,900; Referee: Winfried Buchhart (Schrobenhausen)
	Penalties
	Stevic (penalty missed); Schößler (penalty scored); Maucksch (penalty scored); Kmetsch (penalty scored); Pilz (penalty scored)		Lieberam (penalty scored); Gerstner (penalty scored); Ballwanz (penalty missed); Täuber (penalty missed)

11 September 1993 Round 3	Hannover 96	2 – 3	Dynamo Dresden	Hannover
	Klutz 55'; Schjønberg 63' (pen.)	Report (in German)	Rank 43'; Marschall 43'; Penksa 70'	Stadium: Niedersachsenstadion; Attendance: 16,900; Referee: Reinhard Kuhne (Hamburg)

9 November 1993 Round of 16	Dynamo Dresden	2 – 1	Bayern Munich	Dresden
	Penksa 21'; Marschall 89'	Report (in German)	Scholl 78'	Stadium: Rudolf-Harbig-Stadion; Attendance: 23,700; Referee: Alfons Berg (Konz)

1 December 1993 Quarter-final	Dynamo Dresden	1 – 1 (aet) (5–4 p)	Bayer Leverkusen	Dresden
	Schmäler 99'	Report (in German)	Paulo Sérgio 97'	Stadium: Rudolf-Harbig-Stadion; Attendance: 15,400; Referee: Hartmut Strampe (Handorf)
	Penalties
	Schößler (penalty scored); Marschall (penalty scored); Mauscksch (penalty scored); Kmetsch (penalty scored); Pilz (penalty scored)		Paulo Sérgio (penalty scored); Foda (penalty scored); Hapal (penalty missed); Wörns (penalty scored); Thom (penalty scored)

9 March 1994 Semi-final	Dynamo Dresden	0 – 2	Werder Bremen	Dresden
		Report (in German)	Rufer 18'; Neubarth 37'	Stadium: Rudolf-Harbig-Stadion; Attendance: 29,000; Referee: Karl-Josef Assenmacher (Fischenich)

== Transfers ==
=== In ===
Player	From	Date
(Russia) Stanislav Cherchesov	Spartak Moscow	Summer
(Germany) Henri Fuchs	1. FC Köln	Summer
(Germany) Markus Kranz	Bayer Uerdingen	Summer
(Croatia) Nikica Maglica	NK Zagreb	Summer
(Germany) Olaf Marschall	Admira Wacker	Summer
(Poland) Piotr Nowak	BSC Young Boys	Summer
(Czechoslovakia) Marek Penksa	Eintracht Frankfurt (loan)	Summer
(Germany) Werner Rank	BSV Brandenburg	Summer
(Germany) Uwe Rösler	1. FC Nürnberg	Summer
(Denmark) Henrik Risom	Lyngby BK	January

=== Out ===
Player	To	Date
(Germany) Ralf Hauptmann	1. FC Köln	Summer
(Germany) Jens Melzig	Bayer Leverkusen	Summer
(Federal Republic of Yugoslavia) Vladan Milovanovic	VfL Osnabrück	Summer
(Germany) Jörg Stübner	FC Sachsen Leipzig	Summer
(Germany) Ronny Teuber	Borussia Dortmund	Summer
(Germany) Wolfram Wagner	unknown	Summer
(Germany) Dirk Zander	FC St. Pauli	Summer
(Germany) Alexander Zickler	Bayern Munich	Summer
(Germany) Andreas Wagenhaus	Fenerbahçe	August
(Germany) Uwe Rösler	Manchester City	March
