= 1991–92 Dynamo Dresden season =

Dynamo Dresden
1991–92 season
- Manager: Helmut Schulte
- Bundesliga: 14th
- DFB-Pokal: Round 3
- Top goalscorer: League: Torsten Gütschow (10); All: Torsten Gütschow (11)

The 1991–92 season was the first in which teams from the former East were integrated into the unified German system, and Dynamo Dresden entered into the Bundesliga, having finished as runners-up in the NOFV-Oberliga the previous season. Dynamo battled against relegation for much of the season, but pulled clear with a good run of results towards the end of the season, and finished the season in 14th place.

== Squad ==
Note: Flags indicate national team as defined under FIFA eligibility rules; some limited exceptions apply. Players may hold more than one non-FIFA nationality.

No.	Pos.	Nation	Player
—	GK	(Germany) GER	René Müller
—	GK	(Germany) GER	Frank Schulze
—	GK	(Germany) GER	Ronny Teuber
—	DF	(Germany) GER	Steffen Büttner
—	DF	(Germany) GER	Mario Kern
—	DF	(Germany) GER	Frank Lieberam
—	DF	(Germany) GER	Matthias Maucksch
—	DF	(Germany) GER	Jens Melzig
—	DF	(Germany) GER	Oliver Pagé
—	DF	(Germany) GER	Detlef Schößler
—	DF	(Germany) GER	Andreas Trautmann (to January)
—	DF	(Germany) GER	Andreas Wagenhaus

No.	Pos.	Nation	Player
—	MF	(Germany) GER	Ralf Hauptmann
—	MF	(Germany) GER	Uwe Jähnig
—	MF	(Germany) GER	Sven Kmetsch
—	MF	(Germany) GER	Hans-Uwe Pilz
—	MF	(Germany) GER	Heiko Scholz
—	MF	(Germany) GER	Jörg Stübner
—	MF	(Germany) GER	Dirk Zander
—	FW	(Germany) GER	Sergio Allievi
—	FW	(Germany) GER	Torsten Gütschow
—	FW	(Germany) GER	Sven Ratke
—	FW	(Germany) GER	Uwe Rösler

== Results ==
=== Bundesliga ===
3 August 1991	Dynamo Dresden	0–1	1. FC Kaiserslautern	Dresden
15:30		Report	Dooley 37'	Stadium: Rudolf-Harbig-Stadion; Attendance: 23,000; Referee: Michael Prengel (Düsseldorf)

9 August 1991	Hamburger SV	2–0	Dynamo Dresden	Hamburg
20:00	Spörl 76'; Nando 83'	Report		Stadium: Volksparkstadion; Attendance: 24,900; Referee: Hermann Albrecht (Kaufbeuren)

13 August 1991	Dynamo Dresden	2–1	Eintracht Frankfurt	Dresden
20:00	Gütschow 40', 81'	Report	Möller 27'	Stadium: Rudolf-Harbig-Stadion; Attendance: 20,5000; Referee: Wolf-Günter Wiesel (Ottbergen)

20 August 1991	1. FC Nürnberg	1–1	Dynamo Dresden	Nuremberg
20:00	Wolf 61'	Report	Gütschow 54'	Stadium: Frankenstadion; Attendance: 30,700; Referee: Alfons Berg (Konz)

23 August 1991	Dynamo Dresden	0–2	Bayern Munich	Dresden
20:00		Report	Labbadia 45'; Wohlfarth 62'	Stadium: Rudolf-Harbig-Stadion; Attendance: 30,000; Referee: Manfred Führer (Steinhagen)

28 August 1991	Borussia Dortmund	4–0	Dynamo Dresden	Dortmund
20:00	Chapuisat 66', 72'; Poschner 76'; Schmidt 88'	Report		Stadium: Westfalenstadion; Attendance: 35,000; Referee: Manfred Amerell (Munich)

31 August 1991	Dynamo Dresden	1–0	VfB Stuttgart	Dresden
15:30	Zander 23'	Report		Stadium: Rudolf-Harbig-Stadion; Attendance: 17,000; Referee: Hans-Joachim Osmers (Bremen)

7 September 1991	Borussia Mönchengladbach	1–0	Dynamo Dresden	Mönchengladbach
15:30	Wynhoff 32'	Report		Stadium: Bökelbergstadion; Attendance: 13,600; Referee: Hartmut Strampe (Handorf)

14 September 1991	Dynamo Dresden	3–0	SG Wattenscheid 09	Dresden
15:30	Scholz 32'; Gütschow 56'; Allievi 65'	Report		Stadium: Rudolf-Harbig-Stadion; Attendance: 13,000; Referee: Rainer Boos (Kronberg)

21 September 1991	Bayer Leverkusen	4–0	Dynamo Dresden	Leverkusen
15:30	Fischer 37'; Lupescu 54'; Kree 66'; Schröder 89'	Report		Stadium: Ulrich-Haberland-Stadion; Attendance: 11,300; Referee: Markus Merk (Otterbach)

28 September 1991	Dynamo Dresden	0–0	MSV Duisburg	Dresden
15:30		Report		Stadium: Rudolf-Harbig-Stadion; Attendance: 12,700; Referee: Aron Schmidhuber (Ottobrunn)

4 October 1991	Karlsruher SC	1–0	Dynamo Dresden	Karlsruhe
20:00	Schütterle 57'	Report		Stadium: Wildparkstadion; Attendance: 14,000; Referee: Wolfgang Mierswa (Hennigsen)

12 October 1991	Dynamo Dresden	2–1	Werder Bremen	Dresden
15:30	Scholz 13'; Gütschow 15'	Report	Neubarth 57'	Stadium: Rudolf-Harbig-Stadion; Attendance: 15,000; Referee: Hellmut Krug (Gelsenkirchen)

19 October 1991	Hansa Rostock	3–0	Dynamo Dresden	Rostock
15:30	Wahl 46'; Spies 53'; Weichert 88'	Report		Stadium: Ostseestadion; Attendance: 9,000; Referee: Markus Weber (Bergkamen)

25 October 1991	Dynamo Dresden	2–0	Fortuna Düsseldorf	Dresden
20:00	Gütschow 68', 82'	Report		Stadium: Rudolf-Harbig-Stadion; Attendance: 11,000; Referee: Hans-Peter Best (Kämpfelbach)

2 November 1991	Schalke 04	1–1	Dynamo Dresden	Gelsenkirchen
15:30	Christensen 66'	Report	Rösler 5'	Stadium: Parkstadion; Attendance: 43,700; Referee: Hans Fux (Stutensee)

9 November 1991	Dynamo Dresden	2–2	Stuttgarter Kickers	Dresden
15:30	Gütschow 36'; Pilz 36'	Report	Moutas 5', 76'	Stadium: Rudolf-Harbig-Stadion; Attendance: 13,000; Referee: Manfred Harder (Lüneburg)

30 November 1991	1. FC Kaiserslautern	4–1	Dynamo Dresden	Kaiserslautern
15:30	Hotic 11'; Kuntz 37' (pen.), 55'; Hoffmann 75'	Report	Zander 44' (pen.)	Stadium: Betzenbergstadion; Attendance: 29,547; Referee: Georg Dardenne (Nettersheim)

7 December 1991	Dynamo Dresden	3–0	Hamburger SV	Dresden
15:30	Hartmann 20' (o.g.); Rösler 37'; Kmetsch 88'	Report		Stadium: Rudolf-Harbig-Stadion; Attendance: 10,000; Referee: Karl-Josef Assenmacher (Fischenich)

10 December 1991	1. FC Köln	1–1	Dynamo Dresden	Cologne
20:00	Ordenewitz 22'	Report	Scholz 34'	Stadium: Müngersdorferstadion; Attendance: 15,000; Referee: Manfred Amerell (Munich)

14 December 1991	Eintracht Frankfurt	3–0	Dynamo Dresden	Frankfurt
20:00	Bein 13' (pen.), 48'; Andersen 26'	Report		Stadium: Waldstadion; Attendance: 14,000; Referee: Hans-Joachim Osmers (Bremen)

7 February 1992	Dynamo Dresden	1–2	1. FC Nürnberg	Dresden
15:30	Gütschow 3'	Report	Wück 59'; Golke 83'	Stadium: Rudolf-Harbig-Stadion; Attendance: 13,000; Referee: Karl-Heinz Gläser (Breitungen)

15 February 1992	Bayern Munich	1–2	Dynamo Dresden	Munich
15:30	Wohlfarth 62'	Report	Scholz 40'; Zander 83'	Stadium: Olympiastadion; Attendance: 16,000; Referee: Wolf-Günter Wiesel (Ottbergen)

22 February 1992	Dynamo Dresden	0–0	Borussia Dortmund	Dresden
15:30		Report		Stadium: Rudolf-Harbig-Stadion; Attendance: 18,000; Referee: Hans-Peter Dellwing (Trier)

29 February 1992	VfB Stuttgart	1–1	Dynamo Dresden	Stuttgart
15:30	Müller 19' (o.g.)	Report	Zander 51'	Stadium: Gottlieb-Daimler-Stadion; Attendance: 22,000; Referee: Lothar Löwer (Unna)

6 March 1992	Dynamo Dresden	1–2	Borussia Mönchengladbach	Dresden
20:00	Klinkert 50' (o.g.)	Report	Criens 44'; Klinkert 76'	Stadium: Rudolf-Harbig-Stadion; Attendance: 14,000; Referee: Manfred Neuner (Leimen)

20 March 1992	Dynamo Dresden	1–0	Bayer Leverkusen	Dresden
20:00	Rösler 84'	Report		Stadium: Rudolf-Harbig-Stadion; Attendance: 15,000; Referee: Hartmut Strampe (Handorf)

27 March 1992	MSV Duisburg	3–0	Dynamo Dresden	Duisburg
19:30	Tönnies 21', 74'; Steininger 87'	Report		Stadium: Wedaustadion; Attendance: 12,100; Referee: Hans Scheuerer (Munich)

31 March 1992	SG Wattenscheid 09	3–0	Dynamo Dresden	Wattenscheid
20:00	Tschiskale 19', 28'; Bach 42'	Report		Stadium: Lohrheidestadion; Attendance: 6,000; Referee: Edgar Steinborn (Sinzig)

3 April 1992	Dynamo Dresden	2–0	Karlsruher SC	Dresden
20:00	Melzig 78'; Zander 90'	Report		Stadium: Rudolf-Harbig-Stadion; Attendance: 12,000; Referee: Hellmut Krug (Gelsenkirchen)

11 April 1992	Werder Bremen	2–0	Dynamo Dresden	Bremen
15:30	Bode 42'; Eilts 82'	Report		Stadium: Weserstadion; Attendance: 11,000; Referee: Markus Weber (Bergkamen)

16 April 1992	Dynamo Dresden	2–1	Hansa Rostock	Dresden
20:00	Kmetsch 51'; Zander 83'	Report	Spies 48'	Stadium: Rudolf-Harbig-Stadion; Attendance: 13,000; Referee: Karl-Josef Assenmacher (Fischenich)

24 April 1992	Fortuna Düsseldorf	1–3	Dynamo Dresden	Düsseldorf
20:00	Büskens 3'	Report	Gütschow 34'; Rösler 72'; Zander 82' (pen.)	Stadium: Rheinstadion; Attendance: 5,000; Referee: Hermann Albrecht (Kaufbeuren)

2 May 1992	Dynamo Dresden	2–1	Schalke 04	Dresden
15:30	Zander 39'; Kmetsch 84'	Report	Güttler 73'	Stadium: Rudolf-Harbig-Stadion; Attendance: 26,000; Referee: Bernd Heynemann (Magdeburg)

5 May 1992	Stuttgarter Kickers	0–0	Dynamo Dresden	Stuttgart
20:00		Report		Stadium: Neckarstadion; Attendance: 10,000; Referee: Wolf-Günter Wiesel (Ottbergen)

9 May 1992	VfL Bochum	1–0	Dynamo Dresden	Bochum
15:30	Wegmann 83'	Report		Stadium: Ruhrstadion; Attendance: 17,000; Referee: Aron Schmidhuber (Ottobrunn)

16 May 1992	Dynamo Dresden	0–0	1. FC Köln	Dresden
15:30		Report		Stadium: Rudolf-Harbig-Stadion; Attendance: 26,000; Referee: Eugen Strigel (Horb)

=== DFB-Pokal ===
16 August 1991 Round 2	Greifswalder SC	0–2	Dynamo Dresden	Greifswald
19:00		Report	Rösler 42'; Bertram 49' (o.g.)	Stadium: Volksstadion; Attendance: 3,000; Referee: Norbert Haupt (Berlin)

3 September 1991 Round 3	1. Suhler SV	0–5	Dynamo Dresden	Suhl
20:00		Report	Allievi 23'; Gütschow 39'; Rösler 51'; Kern 71'; Kmetsch 72'	Attendance: 1,300; Referee: Fleischer (Hallstadt)

24 September 1991 Round of 16	Werder Bremen	4–1	Dynamo Dresden	Bremen
20:00	Neubarth 14', 37'; Kohn 86', 88'	Report	Maucksch 5'	Stadium: Weserstadion; Attendance: 11,200; Referee: Werner Föckler (Bad Dürkheim)

== Transfers ==
=== In ===
Player	From	Date
(Germany) Uwe Jähnig	1. FC Magdeburg (loan return)	Summer
(Germany) Jens Melzig	Energie Cottbus	Summer
(Germany) René Müller	FC Sachsen Leipzig	Summer
(Germany) Oliver Pagé	Bayer Leverkusen	Summer
(Germany) Frank Schulze	Viktoria Frankfurt/Oder (loan return)	Summer
(Germany) Dirk Zander	FC St. Pauli	Summer

=== Out ===
Player	To	Date
(Germany) Nico Däbritz	VfB Leipzig	Summer
(Germany) Thomas Köhler	Soemtron Sömmerda	Summer
(Germany) Ralf Minge	Retired	Summer
(Germany) Andreas Trautmann	Released	January
