= 1989–90 DDR-Oberliga =

DDR-Oberliga
- Season: 1989–90
- Dates: 12 August 1989 – 26 May 1990
- Champions: Dynamo Dresden
- Relegated: BSG Wismut Aue; Fortschritt Bischofswerda
- European Cup: Dynamo Dresden
- UEFA Cup: FC Karl-Marx-Stadt; 1. FC Magdeburg
- Matches: 182
- Goals: 467 (2.57 per match)
- Top goalscorer: Torsten Gütschow (Dynamo Dresden) - 18
- Biggest home win: 6–1 (Dynamo Dresden v. FC Berlin)
- Biggest away win: 5–0 (1. FC Magdeburg v. HFC Chemie)
- Highest scoring: Dynamo Dresden (47)
- Highest attendance: 32,867 (Dynamo Dresden v. Lok Leipzig)
- Lowest attendance: 1,400 (three matches)
- Average attendance: 8,303

The 1989–90 DDR-Oberliga was the 41st season of the DDR-Oberliga, the first tier of league football in East Germany. It was the last season of the league under the name of DDR-Oberliga as it played as the NOFV-Oberliga in the following season. East Germany saw great political change during the 1989–90 season with the opening of borders in October 1989, free elections in March 1990 and the eventual German reunification later in the year.

The league was contested by fourteen teams. Dynamo Dresden won the championship, the club's last out of eight East German championships.

Torsten Gütschow of Dynamo Dresden was the league's top scorer with 18 goals, while Ulf Kirsten, also of Dynamo Dresden, took out the seasons East German Footballer of the year award.

On the strength of the 1989–90 title Dynamo Dresden qualified for the 1990–91 European Cup where the club was knocked out by Red Star Belgrade in the quarter finals. Second-placed FC Karl-Marx-Stadt qualified for the 1990–91 UEFA Cup where it was knocked out by Borussia Dortmund in the first round while third-placed 1. FC Magdeburg lost to Girondins de Bordeaux in the second round. With Dynamo Dresden having won the double the losing cup finalist, Dynamo Schwerin, playing in the tier two DDR-Liga, took part in the 1990–91 European Cup Winners' Cup where it was knocked out in the first round by FK Austria Wien.

During the season Berliner FC Dynamo was renamed to FC Berlin, BSG Wismut Aue was renamed to FC Wismut Aue and BSG Stahl Eisenhüttenstadt became Eisenhüttenstädter FC Stahl while further name changes followed in the off-season. As another sign of the changes in East Germany players were, for the first time, allowed to transfer to western clubs during the 1989–90 seasons. Andreas Thom was the first, leaving BFC Dynamo for Bayer 04 Leverkusen in December 1989, followed by others which, while financially lucrative, left DDR-Oberliga clubs like Dynamo weakened.

== Table ==
The 1989–90 season saw two newly promoted clubs, Eisenhüttenstädter FC Stahl and BSG Fortschritt Bischofswerda.

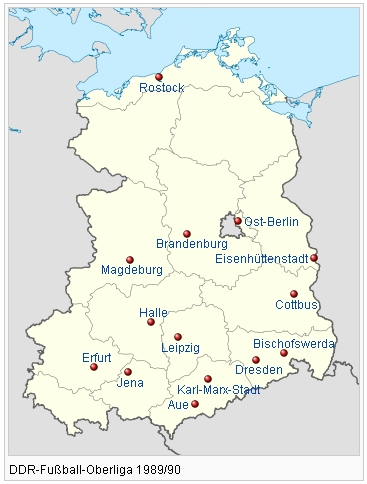

Pos	Team	Pld	W	D	L	GF	GA	GD	Pts	Qualification or relegation
1	SG Dynamo Dresden (C)	26	12	12	2	47	26	+21	36	Qualification to European Cup first round
2	FC Karl-Marx-Stadt	26	13	10	3	35	20	+15	36	Qualification to UEFA Cup first round
3	1. FC Magdeburg	26	13	8	5	39	22	+17	34	Qualification to UEFA Cup first round
4	FC Berlin	26	9	12	5	38	35	+3	30	
5	FC Carl Zeiss Jena	26	11	8	7	29	27	+2	30	
6	F.C. Hansa Rostock	26	9	9	8	38	33	+5	27	
7	FC Energie Cottbus	26	10	7	9	36	37	−1	27	
8	1. FC Lokomotive Leipzig	26	9	7	10	34	33	+1	25	
9	Hallescher FC Chemie	26	8	8	10	38	38	0	24	
10	BSG Stahl Brandenburg	26	6	12	8	35	37	−2	24	
11	FC Rot-Weiss Erfurt	26	5	9	12	29	40	−11	19	
12	FC Stahl Eisenhüttenstadt	26	2	14	10	22	31	−9	18	
13	FC Wismut Aue (R)	26	5	8	13	25	36	−11	18	Relegation to DDR-Liga
14	BSG Fortschritt Bischofswerda (R)	26	7	2	17	22	52	−30	16	Relegation to DDR-Liga

(C) Champions; (R) Relegated

== Results ==
Home \ Away	BER	CZJ	DRE	EFS	ECO	FBW	HFC	HRO	KMS	LOK	MAG	RWE	STB	AUE
FC Berlin		2–0	1–1	0–0	1–1	1–0	3–1	3–0	0–0	1–3	2–1	2–2	5–1	1–4
Carl Zeiss Jena	1–1		1–1	1–1	1–0	1–0	2–0	2–1	1–1	0–0	0–2	1–0	2–2	1–0
Dynamo Dresden	6–1	0–4		2–1	3–0	3–0	2–0	1–1	2–0	3–1	3–1	3–1	3–2	3–0
Eisenhüttenstädter Stahl	1–1	1–2	2–2		1–1	2–0	0–1	1–1	0–0	2–2	0–0	2–2	3–1	0–0
Energie Cottbus	2–2	1–0	0–0	3–1		3–0	1–1	3–1	0–0	1–0	2–0	4–2	3–1	2–1
Fortschritt Bischofswerda	1–1	1–4	0–1	2–0	1–4		0–4	1–4	1–2	2–1	0–1	2–1	1–1	1–0
Hallescher FC Chemie	1–2	1–1	2–2	2–2	3–0	4–0		1–1	4–0	1–0	0–5	3–0	1–3	3–1
Hansa Rostock	3–1	0–1	0–0	1–0	3–0	1–2	2–1		2–2	3–3	0–0	4–1	1–0	2–1
Karl-Marx-Stadt	0–0	3–0	1–1	1–0	3–1	2–1	4–0	1–0		2–1	1–0	2–0	3–0	1–0
Lokomotive Leipzig	1–2	1–0	1–1	2–0	2–0	3–1	1–0	2–2	1–2		1–2	2–1	0–1	2–1
1. FC Magdeburg	3–1	0–2	1–1	2–1	4–1	4–0	3–1	2–1	1–1	2–2		1–0	1–1	1–0
Rot-Weiß Erfurt	1–3	4–1	2–0	0–0	2–2	3–0	1–1	0–1	1–0	2–0	1–1		0–0	1–1
Stahl Brandenburg	1–1	4–0	2–2	0–0	2–0	0–2	1–1	1–1	2–2	1–1	0–1	1–1		4–2
Wismut Aue	0–0	0–0	1–1	2–1	2–1	1–3	1–1	3–2	1–1	0–1	0–0	3–0	0–3	

Legend: Blue = home team win; Yellow = draw; Red = away team win.

== Top goalscorers ==
The seasons top scorers:

	Player	Club	Goals
1.	Torsten Gütschow	SG Dynamo Dresden	18
2.	Steffen Heidrich	FC Karl-Marx-Stadt	12
3.	Uwe Rösler	1. FC Magdeburg	11
3.	Markus Wuckel	1. FC Magdeburg	11
5.	Ulf Kirsten	SG Dynamo Dresden	10
5.	Matthias Sammer	SG Dynamo Dresden	10
5.	Petrik Sander	BSG Energie Cottbus	10

== Championship-winning squad ==
Note: Flags indicate national team as defined under FIFA eligibility rules; some limited exceptions apply. Players may hold more than one non-FIFA nationality.

No.	Pos.	Nation	Player
—	GK	GDR	Thomas Köhler
—	GK	GDR	Frank Schulze
—	GK	GDR	Ronny Teuber
—	DF	GDR	Steffen Büttner
—	DF	GDR	Andreas Diebitz
—	DF	GDR	Mario Kern
—	DF	GDR	Uwe Kirchner
—	DF	GDR	Frank Lieberam
—	DF	GDR	Detlef Schößler
—	DF	GDR	Andreas Trautmann
—	DF	GDR	Andreas Wagenhaus
—	MF	GDR	Matthias Döschner

No.	Pos.	Nation	Player
—	MF	GDR	Ralf Hauptmann
—	MF	GDR	Uwe Jähnig
—	MF	GDR	Sven Kmetsch
—	MF	GDR	Matthias Maucksch
—	MF	GDR	Hans-Uwe Pilz
—	MF	GDR	Sven Ratke
—	MF	GDR	Matthias Sammer
—	MF	GDR	Jörg Stübner
—	FW	GDR	Torsten Gütschow
—	FW	GDR	Ulf Kirsten
—	FW	GDR	Rocco Milde
—	FW	GDR	Ralf Minge
