= 1992–93 Galatasaray S.K. season =

Galatasaray
1992–93 season
- President: (Turkey) Alp Yalman
- Manager: (Germany) Karl-Heinz Feldkamp
- Stadium: Ali Sami Yen Stadı
- 1. Lig: 1st
- Türkiye Kupası: Winner
- UEFA Cup: 3rd round
- Top goalscorer: League: Hakan Şükür (19); All: Hakan Şükür (24)
- Highest home attendance: 32,010 vs Trabzonspor (1. Lig, 4 October 1992)
- Lowest home attendance: 5,187 vs Bakırköy SK (1. Lig, 13 March 1993)
- Average home league attendance: 18,668
Home colours	Away colours	Third colours

The 1992–93 season was Galatasaray's 89th in existence and the 35th consecutive season in the 1. Lig. This article shows statistics of the club's players in the season, and also lists all matches that the club have played in the season.

== Squad statistics ==
No.	Pos.	Name	1. Lig		Türkiye Kupası		UEFA Cup		Total	
No.	Pos.	Name	Apps	Goals	Apps	Goals	Apps	Goals	Apps	Goals
1	GK	(Turkey) Hayrettin Demirbaş	30	0	6	0	6	0	42	0
-	GK	(Turkey) Nezih Boloğlu	0	0	0	0	0	0	0	0
-	DF	(Turkey) İsmail Demiriz	13	0	2	0	3	0	18	0
3	DF	(Turkey) Bülent Korkmaz	29	1	6	0	5	0	40	1
2	DF	(Turkey) Mert Korkmaz	23	0	5	0	5	0	33	0
4	DF	(Turkey) Yusuf Altıntaş	22	2	4	0	5	0	31	2
5	DF	(Germany) Reinhard Stumpf	26	2	6	0	6	0	38	2
-	MF	(Turkey) Seyfettin Kurtulmuş	1	0	0	0	0	0	1	0
-	MF	(Turkey) Tayfun Hut	1	0	0	0	1	0	2	0
7	MF	(Turkey) Okan Buruk	15	0	1	0	5	0	21	0
6	MF	(Turkey) Hamza Hamzaoğlu	26	2	6	0	3	0	35	2
-	MF	(Turkey) Muhammed Altıntaş	11	0	0	0	5	0	16	0
8	MF	(Turkey) Tugay Kerimoğlu	25	5	6	1	5	0	36	6
-	MF	(Turkey) Suat Kaya	8	0	3	0	1	0	12	0
-	MF	(Turkey) Mustafa Kocabey	18	10	2	1	2	2	19	13
-	MF	(Germany) Falko Götz	28	12	5	1	6	1	39	14
-	FW	(Turkey) Erdal Keser (C)	16	3	5	4	2	0	23	7
10	FW	(Turkey) Arif Erdem	15	3	3	1	1	1	19	5
11	FW	(Bosnia and Herzegovina) Elvir Bolić	8	2	0	0	5	0	13	2
-	FW	(Turkey) Uğur Tütüneker	20	2	5	0	5	1	30	3
-	FW	(Turkey) Şevket Candar	10	1	3	0	0	0	13	1
-	FW	(Germany) Torsten Gütschow	15	10	4	2	0	0	19	12
9	FW	(Turkey) Hakan Şükür	30	19	6	3	6	2	42	24

=== Players in / out ===
==== In ====
Pos.	Nat.	Name	Age	Moving from
FW	(Turkey)	Hakan Şükür	21	Bursaspor
DF	(Germany)	Reinhard Stumpf	31	1. FC Kaiserslautern
MF	(Germany)	Falko Götz	30	1. FC Köln
FW	(Germany)	Torsten Gütschow	30	Dynamo Dresden
FW	(Bosnia and Herzegovina)	Elvir Bolić	21	FK Crvena Zvezda
MF	(Turkey)	Suat Kaya	25	Konyaspor
FW	(Turkey)	Seyfettin Kurtulmuş	19	Edirnespor
MF	(Turkey)	Mustafa Kocabey	18	Galatasaray A2

==== Out ====
Pos.	Nat.	Name	Age	Moving to
DF	(Turkey)	Erhan Önal	35	career end
FW	(Poland)	Roman Kosecki	26	CA Osasuna
FW	(Nigeria)	Dominic Iorfa	24	Peterborough United
MF	(Turkey)	Mustafa Yücedağ	26	Fenerbahçe SK
MF	(Turkey)	Taner Alpak	25	Mersin İdman Yurdu
FW	(Turkey)	Selçuk Yula	33	career end
MF	(Turkey)	Tayfun Hut (on loan)	25	Aydınspor

== 1. Lig ==
=== Standings ===
Pos	Team	Pld	W	D	L	GF	GA	GD	Pts	Qualification or relegation
1	Galatasaray (C)	30	20	6	4	74	21	+53	66	Qualification to Champions League first round
2	Beşiktaş	30	19	9	2	68	23	+45	66	Qualification to Cup Winners' Cup first round
3	Trabzonspor	30	17	9	4	57	27	+30	60	Qualification to UEFA Cup first round
4	Kocaelispor	30	17	8	5	56	30	+26	59	Qualification to UEFA Cup first round
5	Fenerbahçe	30	18	4	8	75	41	+34	58	

Rules for classification: 1) points; 2) goal difference; 3) number of goals scored.
(C) Champions

=== Matches ===
23 August 1992 1	Gençlerbirliği SK	0–3	Galatasaray SK	Ankara
15:30 EET		(Report)	Erdal Keser 31', 56'; Bülent Korkmaz 81'	Stadium: Ankara 19 Mayıs Stadı; Attendance: 24,851; Referee: Hasan Ceylan

30 August 1992 2	Galatasaray SK	1–2	Altay SK	Istanbul
15:30 EET	Falko Götz 67p'	(Report)	Gueorgul Dimitrov 12'; Ramazan Torunoğlu 44'	Stadium: Ali Sami Yen Stadı; Attendance: 28,763; Referee: Metin Tokat

6 September 1992 3	Karşıyaka SK	1–2	Galatasaray SK	İzmir
15:30 EET	Recep Umut 51'	(Report)	Hamza Hamzaoğlu 20'; Elvir Bolić 53'	Stadium: İzmir Atatürk Stadium; Attendance: 45,653; Referee: Sadık Deda

12 September 1992 4	Galatasaray SK	1–0	Aydınspor 1923	Istanbul
17:00 EET	Mustafa Kocabey 74'	(Report)		Stadium: Ali Sami Yen Stadı; Attendance: 9,523; Referee: Erman Toroğlu

26 September 1992 5	Kayserispor	1–1	Galatasaray SK	Kayseri
13:30 EET	Salih Eken 44'	(Report)	Hakan Şükür 58'	Stadium: Kayseri Atatürk Stadı; Referee: Hasan Ceylan

4 October 1992 6	Galatasaray SK	1–1	Trabzonspor	Istanbul
14:00 EET	Hakan Şükür 71'	(Report)	Jacek Cyzio 89'	Stadium: Ali Sami Yen Stadı; Attendance: 32,010; Referee: Oğuz Sarvan

11 October 1992 7	Bakırköy SK	0–1	Galatasaray SK	Istanbul
14:00 EET		(Report)	Falko Götz 42p'	Stadium: Ali Sami Yen Stadı; Attendance: 20,445; Referee: Adnan Türkkan

17 October 1992 8	Galatasaray SK	4–2	Bursaspor	Istanbul
18:00 EET	Mustafa Kocabey 55', 82', 89'; Hakan Şükür 86'	(Report)	Ali Nail Durmuş 16', 67'	Stadium: İnönü Stadı; Attendance: 14,196; Referee: Sadık Deda

31 October 1992 9	Gaziantepspor	0–5	Galatasaray SK	Gaziantep
13:00 EET		(Report)	Falko Götz 18', 89'; Mustafa Kocabey 28'; Elvir Bolić 76'; Hakan Şükür 79'	Stadium: Kamil Ocak Stadı; Referee: Engin Kurt

8 November 1992 10	Galatasaray SK	0–1	Fenerbahçe SK	Istanbul
13:00 EET		(Report)	Aykut Kocaman 57'	Stadium: Ali Sami Yen Stadı; Attendance: 31,675; Referee: Ahmet Çakar

14 November 1992 11	Sarıyer G.K.	0–0	Galatasaray SK	Istanbul
13:00 EET		(Report)		Stadium: Fenerbahçe Stadı; Attendance: 2,275; Referee: Sabri Çelik

29 November 1992 12	Konyaspor	0–1	Galatasaray SK	Konya
13:00 EET		(Report)	Erdal Keser 8'	Stadium: Konya Atatürk Stadı; Referee: Bülent Yavuz

5 December 1992 13	Beşiktaş JK	1–3	Galatasaray SK	Istanbul
18:00 EET	Feyyaz Uçar 23'	(Report)	Hakan Şükür 34', 81'; Reinhard Stumpf 65'	Stadium: İnönü Stadı; Attendance: 20,583; Referee: Sabri Çelik

20 December 1992 14	Galatasaray SK	3–0	MKE Ankaragücü	Istanbul
13:00 EET	Mustafa Kocabey 5'; Torsten Gütschow 41', 58'	(Report)		Stadium: Ali Sami Yen Stadı; Attendance: 11,945; Referee: İbrahim Aksoy

27 December 1992 15	Galatasaray SK	1–1	Kocaelispor	Istanbul
13:00 EET	Uğur Tütüneker 46'	(Report)	Saffet Sancaklı 44'	Stadium: Ali Sami Yen Stadı; Attendance: 22,545; Referee: Serdar Çakman

23 January 1993 16	Galatasaray SK	5–2	Gençlerbirliği SK	Istanbul
13:30 EET	Torsten Gütschow 2'; Hakan Şükür 4'; Yusuf Altıntaş 66', 81'; Hamza Hamzaoğlu 70'	(Report)	Rövşen Türkmen 86'; Kemalettin Şentürk 89'	Stadium: Ali Sami Yen Stadı; Attendance: 8,085; Referee: Sadık Deda

31 January 1993 17	Altay SK	1–0	Galatasaray SK	İzmir
13:30 EET	Reha Kapsal 59'	(Report)		Stadium: İzmir Atatürk Stadium; Attendance: 25,635; Referee: Serdar Çakman

7 February 1993 18	Galatasaray SK	4–1	Karşıyaka SK	Istanbul
13:30 EET	Falko Götz 13p' Tugay Kerimoğlu 17'; Hakan Şükür 66'; Mustafa Kocabey 88'	(Report)	Recep Umut 70'	Stadium: Ali Sami Yen Stadı; Attendance: 17,340; Referee: Vahap Beyaz

14 February 1993 19	Aydınspor 1923	1–3	Galatasaray SK	Aydın
13:30 EET	Djamel Amani 18'	(Report)	Mustafa Kocabey 12', 34'; Hakan Şükür 62'	Stadium: Adnan Menderes Stadium; Referee: Bülent Yavuz

20 February 1993 20	Galatasaray SK	4–2	Kayserispor	Istanbul
13:30 EET	Reinhard Stumpf 24'; Mustafa Kocabey 50'; Falko Götz 60'; Tugay Kerimoğlu 89'	(Report)	Hamdi Özturgut 43'; Kemal Alispahić 84p'	Stadium: Ali Sami Yen Stadı; Attendance: 8,090; Referee: Engin Kurt

28 February 1993 21	Trabzonspor	1–0	Galatasaray SK	Trabzon
13:00 EET	Jacek Cyzio 21'	(Report)		Stadium: Hüseyin Avni Aker Stadı; Referee: Serdar Çakman

13 March 1993 22	Galatasaray SK	3–0	Bakırköy SK	Istanbul
14:00 EET	Hakan Şükür 21', 59', 66'	(Report)		Stadium: Ali Sami Yen Stadı; Attendance: 5,187; Referee: Serdar Çakır

20 March 1993 23	Bursaspor	1–3	Galatasaray SK	Bursa
14:00 EET	Yalçın Gündüz 38'	(Report)	Falko Götz 61', 76p' Arif Erdem 79'	Stadium: Bursa Atatürk Stadı; Referee: Yavuz Karaozan

3 April 1993 24	Galatasaray SK	3–0	Gaziantepspor	Istanbul
18:00 EET	Torsten Gütschow 35'; Hakan Şükür 73'; Şevket Candar 75'	(Report)		Stadium: İnönü Stadı; Attendance: 10,634; Referee: Oğuz Sarvan

11 April 1993 25	Fenerbahçe SK	1–4	Galatasaray SK	Istanbul
15:00 EET	Tanju Çolak 68'	(Report)	Torsten Gütschow 7'; Tugay Kerimoğlu 50', 76p' Hakan Şükür 55'	Stadium: Fenerbahçe Stadı; Attendance: 27,800; Referee: Bülent Yavuz

2 May 1993 26	Galatasaray SK	4–0	Sarıyer G.K.	Istanbul
15:30 EET	Falko Götz 50'; Torsten Gütschow 64'; Hakan Şükür 75', 86'	(Report)	26,489	Stadium: Ali Sami Yen Stadı; Referee: Ergül Yücedağ

9 May 1993 27	Kocaelispor	0–0	Galatasaray SK	Izmit
15:30 EET		(Report)		Stadium: İsmet Paşa Stadium; Referee: Bülent Yavuz

16 May 1993 28	Galatasaray SK	5–0	Konyaspor	Istanbul
15:30 EET	Hakan Şükür 33'; Falko Götz 63'; Torsten Gütschow 75'; Tugay Kerimoğlu 78'; Uğur Tütüneker 80'	(Report)	29,424	Stadium: Ali Sami Yen Stadı; Referee: Vahap Beyaz

22 May 1993 29	Galatasaray SK	1–1	Beşiktaş JK	Istanbul
16:30 EET	Hakan Şükür 5'	(Report)	Feyyaz Uçar 18p'	Stadium: Ali Sami Yen Stadı; Attendance: 24,117; Referee: Ahmet Çakar

30 May 1993 30	MKE Ankaragücü	0–8	Galatasaray SK	Ankara
15:30 EET		(Report)	Arif Erdem 6', 49'; Falko Götz 9', 70'; Torsten Gütschow 28', 32', 34'; Hakan Şükür 46'	Stadium: Ankara 19 Mayıs Stadı; Attendance: 16,562; Referee: Ünsal Çimen

== Türkiye Kupası ==
Kick-off listed in local time (EET)

=== 6th round ===
23 December 1992 1	Bartınspor	1–4	Galatasaray SK	Bartın
12:30 EET	Ferruh Yücel 65'	(Report)	Torsten Gütschow 5', 68'; Erdal Keser 50'; Hakan Şükür 66'	Stadium: Atatürk Stadı; Referee: Alican Lakot

=== 1/4 final ===
27 January 1993 1	Galatasaray SK	2–0	Çanakkale Dardanelspor	Istanbul
13:00 EET	Erdal Keser 61', 66'	(Report)		Stadium: Ali Sami Yen Stadı; Attendance: 18,793; Referee: Yusuf Yaylı

=== 1/2 final ===
10 February 1993 1	Galatasaray SK	3–0	Trabzonspor	Istanbul
13:30 EET	Mustafa Kocabey 34'; Tugay Kerimoğlu 62'; Falko Götz 67p'	(Report)		Stadium: Ali Sami Yen Stadı; Attendance: 10,625; Referee: Erman Toroğlu

17 March 1993 2	Trabzonspor	3–1	Galatasaray SK	Trabzon
12:00 EET	Juriy Chelepnitski 8', 44'; Orhan Çıkırıkçı 88'	(Report)	Hakan Şükür 84'	Stadium: Hüseyin Avni Aker Stadı; Referee: Sadık Deda

=== Final ===
24 March 1993 1	Galatasaray SK	1–0	Beşiktaş JK	Istanbul
14:00 EET	Erdal Keser 44'	(Report)		Stadium: Ali Sami Yen Stadı; Attendance: 22,446; Referee: Bülent Yavuz

7 April 1993 2	Beşiktaş JK	2–2	Galatasaray SK	Istanbul
18:00 EET	Feyyaz Uçar 44'; Ulvi Güveneroğlu 84'	(Report)	Hakan Şükür 2'; Arif Erdem 26'	Stadium: İnönü Stadı; Attendance: 21,582; Referee: Ahmet Çakar

== UEFA Cup ==
=== 1st round ===
16 September 1992 1	GKS Katowice	0–0	Galatasaray SK	Katowice
20:00 CEST		(Report)		Stadium: Stadion GKS Katowice; Attendance: 2,610; Referee: (Romania) Marian Mircea Salomir

29 September 1992 2	Galatasaray SK	2–1	GKS Katowice	Istanbul
20:00 TRT	Hakan Şükür 30'; Falko Götz 55p'	(Report)	Krzysztof Maciejewski 73'	Stadium: Ali Sami Yen Stadium; Attendance: 9,000; Referee: (Wales) Rodger Gifford

=== 2nd round ===
21 October 1992 1	Eintracht Frankfurt	0–0	Galatasaray SK	Frankfurt
20:15 CEST		(Report)		Stadium: Waldstadion; Attendance: 40,000; Referee: (Scotland) Brian McGinlay

4 November 1992 2	Galatasaray SK	1–0	Eintracht Frankfurt	Istanbul
13:00 TRT	Uğur Tütüneker 5'	(Report)		Stadium: Ali Sami Yen Stadı; Attendance: 22,370; Referee: (Italy) Pierluigi Pairetto

=== 3rd round ===
25 November 1992 1	AS Roma	3–1	Galatasaray SK	Rome
18:45 CET	Aldair 59', 90'; Roberto Muzzi 80'	(Report)	Hakan Şükür 85'	Stadium: Stadio Olimpico; Attendance: 23,380; Referee: (Germany) Bernd Heynemann

9 December 1992 2	Galatasaray SK	3–2	AS Roma	Istanbul
13:00 TRT	Mustafa Kocabey 27', 58'; Arif Erdem 75'	(Report)	Claudio Caniggia 7'; Thomas Häßler 47'	Stadium: Ali Sami Yen Stadı; Attendance: 22,868; Referee: (Denmark) Peter Mikkelsen

== Friendly Matches ==
Kick-off listed in local time (EET)

=== TSYD Kupası ===
12 August 1992 1	Galatasaray SK	3–2	Beşiktaş JK	Istanbul
17:30 EET	Okan Buruk 22', 89'; Şevket Candar 37'	(Report)	Feyyaz Uçar 27'; Fani Madida 55'	Stadium: Ali Sami Yen Stadı; Attendance: 12,669; Referee: Halil Taner Yalçındağ

16 August 1992 2	Fenerbahçe SK	2–3	Galatasaray SK	Istanbul
18:30 EET	Tanju Çolak 35'; Stanimir Stoilov 45'	(Report)	Hakan Şükür 2'; Falko Götz 83', 90'	Stadium: İnönü Stadı; Attendance: 22,215; Referee: Ahmet Çakar

== Attendance ==
Competition	Av. Att.	Total Att.
1. Lig	18,668	280,023
Türkiye Kupası	17,288	51,864
UEFA Cup	24,625	73,874
Total	19,322	405,761
