= Torsten Gütschow =

German footballer and manager

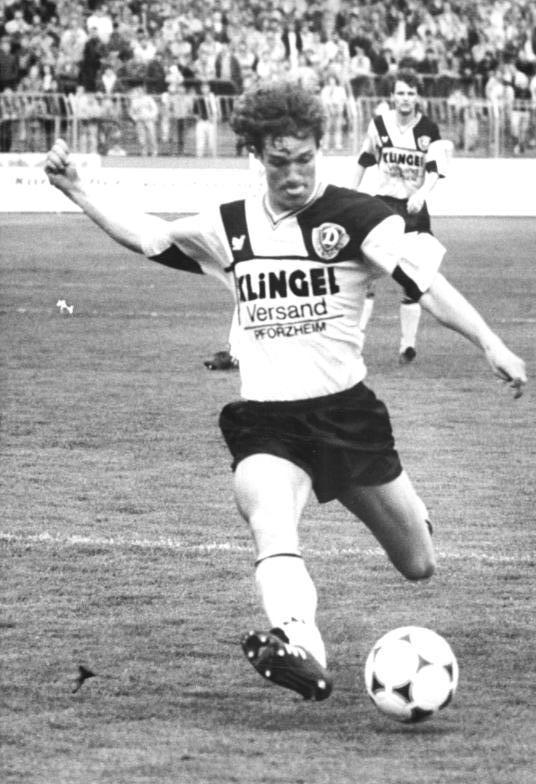
- Gütschow taking a shot in 1990

Personal information
- Full name: Torsten Jens Gütschow
- Date of birth: 28 July 1962 (age 64)
- Place of birth: Görlitz, East Germany
- Height: 1.75 m (5 ft 9 in)
- Position: Striker

Youth career
- 1968–1973: Traktor Zodel
- 1973–1976: Dynamo Görlitz
- 1976–1980: Dynamo Dresden

Senior career*
Years	Team	Apps	(Gls)
1980–1992	Dynamo Dresden	247	(116)
1992–1993	Galatasaray	15	(10)
1993–1994	Carl Zeiss Jena	9	(0)
1994–1995	Hannover 96	33	(16)
1995–1996	Chemnitzer FC	34	(15)
1996–1999	Dynamo Dresden	82	(33)
Total		420	(190)

International career
1979	East Germany U18 (de)	4	(3)
1981–1983	East Germany U21	16	(4)
1984	East Germany Olympic	3	(2)
1984–1989	East Germany	3	(2)

Managerial career
- 2003–2004: FC Oberneuland
- 2006–2013: TuS Heeslingen
- 2014: TSG Neustrelitz
- 2017–2019: FSV Budissa Bautzen
- 2022–2023: Bremer SV
- 2023: SG Dynamo Schwerin
- * Club domestic league appearances and goals

Torsten Gütschow (born 28 July 1962) is a German football manager and former player who played as a striker. He is most associated with Dynamo Dresden, with whom he had two successful spells, playing top level football in East Germany and after reunification. In between these he played for three other German clubs, and spent six months with Galatasaray of the Turkish Süper Lig. A strong and instinctive goalscorer, Gütschow was top scorer in each of the last three seasons of the DDR-Oberliga, and was the last East German Footballer of the Year. He won three international caps for East Germany, scoring two goals between 1984 and 1989. Since retiring he has taken up coaching, and has been manager of TuS Heeslingen.

== Playing career ==
=== In East Germany ===
Gütschow played as a youth for Traktor Zodel and Dynamo Görlitz, before joining Dynamo Dresden in 1976. After four years in their youth setup, he was promoted to the first-team, making his DDR-Oberliga debut in 1980. He established himself as a consistent goalscorer, and scored 17 goals in the 1984–85 season. The next two seasons were blighted by injury, but he returned to form, partnering Ulf Kirsten up front, and was the league's top scorer in its last three seasons. His seven goals in the 1988–89 UEFA Cup made him the competition's top scorer and in 1991 he was named as the last East German Footballer of the Year.

During much of Gütschow's time with Dynamo Dresden, the league was dominated by BFC Dynamo, who won ten consecutive league titles from 1979 to 1988. Dresden broke this run by winning the championship in 1989 and 1990, adding a cup win in the latter season to complete the double. They had also won the cup in 1982, 1984 and 1985.

=== After reunification ===
The last season of the DDR-Oberliga (now renamed the NOFV-Oberliga) saw Dynamo Dresden finish second, behind Hansa Rostock, and with German reunification they qualified for the Bundesliga. In their first season they finished in 14th place, and Gütschow was the team's top scorer, with 10 goals from 31 appearances. The following season, he played eight matches, scoring twice, before leaving in December 1992, joining Galatasaray of the Turkish Süper Lig. Gütschow's 12 Bundesliga goals are still the most of any Dynamo Dresden player.

Galatasaray had a German coach, Karl-Heinz Feldkamp, and two other German players in Falko Götz and Reinhard Stumpf. Gütschow settled in immediately, and scored 10 goals in 15 league appearances, as the club won a league and cup double. Gütschow only spent six months in Turkey, returning to Germany in summer 1993 but remains a popular figure with Galatasaray fans.

Gütschow returned to Germany with Carl Zeiss Jena of the 2. Bundesliga, but had a singularly unsuccessful season, making only nine league appearances and failing to score. He left Jena after one year, and followed this with single-year spells at two other 2. Liga clubs – Hannover 96 and Chemnitzer FC. He had more personal success in both these seasons, scoring 16 and 15 goals respectively, but the latter ended in relegation for Chemnitz.

In 1996, Gütschow returned to Dynamo Dresden, now in the third-tier Regionalliga Nordost. He spent three years with the club as they tried unsuccessfully to get promoted to the second division, before retiring in 1999. In total, he had made 329 league appearances for Dynamo, scoring 149 goals, across two spells.

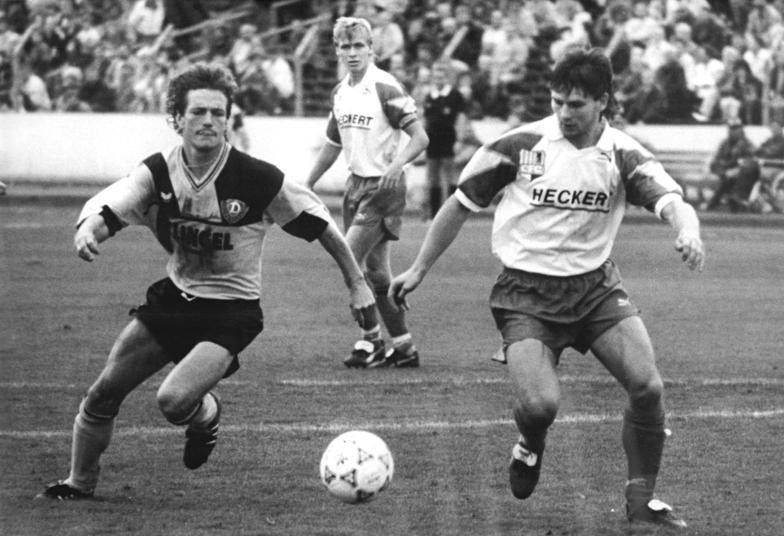
Gütschow (left) chases the ball in a 1990 match against Chemnitzer FC.

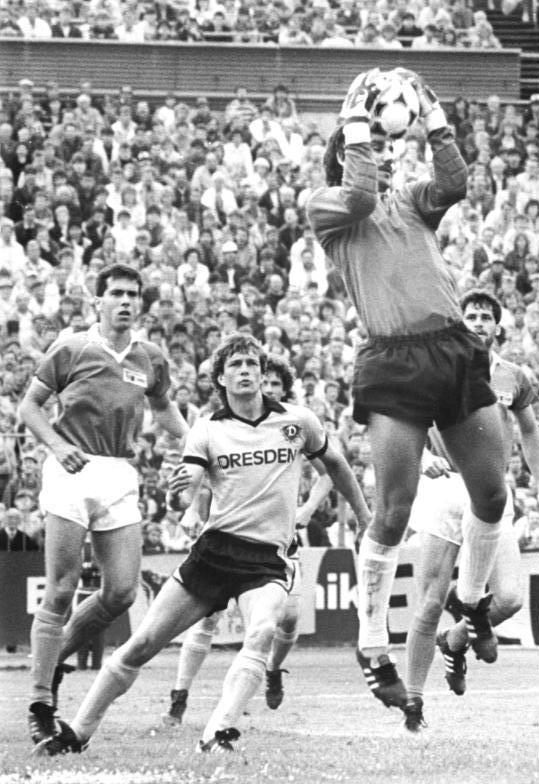
Gütschow (centre) watches a shot being saved by Henryk Lihsa shot saved during Dynamo Dresden's 5–0 win over 1. FC Union Berlin in 1989

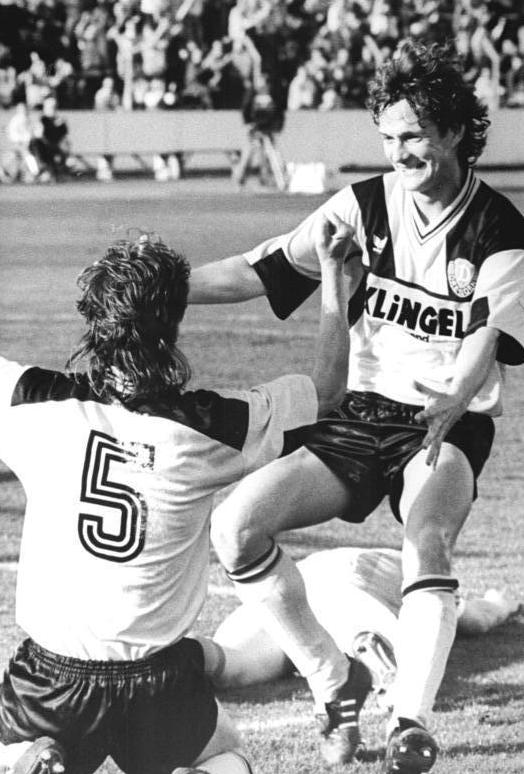
Gütschow celebrates with Steffen Büttner (number 5) during a 3–0 win against Rot-Weiß Erfurt in 1990

=== International career ===
Gütschow was called up to the East Germany national team in February 1984, making his debut in a 3–1 away win against Greece. His second cap came later in the same year, also against Greece – this time he scored again in a 1–0 home win. His third and final cap didn't come until 1989, in a 1–1 draw with Finland at his home stadium in Dresden. He was also capped at under-21 level and made three appearances for the DDR Olympic team.

== Coaching career ==
After ending his playing career, Gütschow took up coaching. He worked with VfL Bochum's reserve team, and was manager of FC Oberneuland from 2003 to 2004. In 2006, he was appointed as manager of TuS 1906 Heeslingen, and won promotion to the Oberliga Nord in his first season. Gütchow remained at the club at seven years, leaving in at the end of the 2012–13 season when the club withdrew from the Oberliga for financial reasons. He took over at Regionalliga Nordost side TSG Neustrelitz a year later.

== Stasi ==
Gütschow worked as an Inoffizieller Mitarbeiter (paid informant) for the Stasi. He admitted to spying on around 60 players and staff between 1981 and 1989. Gütschow was approached by the authorities at the age of 18, and feared that he would be prevented from playing football and separated from his fiancee if he refused to co-operate.

== Career statistics ==
=== Club ===
Appearances and goals by club, season and competition
Club	Season	League			Cup (Note: Appearances in FDGB Pokal, NOFV Pokal, DFB-Pokal, Turkish Cup and Sachsenpokal)		Continental (Note: Appearances in European Cup, UEFA Cup and UEFA Cup Winners' Cup)		Total	
Club	Season	Division	Apps	Goals	Apps	Goals	Apps	Goals	Apps	Goals
Dynamo Dresden	1980–81	DDR-Oberliga	14	3	0	0	0	0	14	3
Dynamo Dresden	1981–82	DDR-Oberliga	15	4	5	2	3	0	23	6
Dynamo Dresden	1982–83	DDR-Oberliga	25	9	4	1	2	0	31	10
Dynamo Dresden	1983–84	DDR-Oberliga	20	7	3	2	–		23	9
Dynamo Dresden	1984–85	DDR-Oberliga	26	17	8	3	6	1	40	21
Dynamo Dresden	1985–86	DDR-Oberliga	9	0	3	0	2	0	14	0
Dynamo Dresden	1986–87	DDR-Oberliga	2	0	1	0	0	0	3	0
Dynamo Dresden	1987–88	DDR-Oberliga	20	9	4	2	2	0	26	11
Dynamo Dresden	1988–89	DDR-Oberliga	26	17	3	2	9	7	38	26
Dynamo Dresden	1989–90	DDR-Oberliga	25	18	6	10	1	1	32	29
Dynamo Dresden	1990–91	NOFV-Oberliga	26	20	3	1	6	5	35	26
Dynamo Dresden	1991–92	Bundesliga	31	10	3	1	–		34	11
Dynamo Dresden	1992–93	Bundesliga	8	2	0	0	–		8	2
Dynamo Dresden	Total		247	116	43	24	31	14	321	154
Galatasaray	1992–93	1. Lig	15	10	4	2	–		19	12
Carl Zeiss Jena	1993–94	2. Bundesliga	9	0	2	0	–		11	0
Hannover 96	1994–95	2. Bundesliga	33	16	2	1	–		35	17
Chemnitzer FC	1995–96	2. Bundesliga	34	15	2	2	–		36	17
Dynamo Dresden	1996–97	Regionalliga Nordost	30	12	0	0	–		30	12
Dynamo Dresden	1997–98	Regionalliga Nordost	32	16	4	2	–		36	18
Dynamo Dresden	1998–99	Regionalliga Nordost	20	5	3	0	–		23	5
Dynamo Dresden	Total		82	33	7	2	0	0	89	35
Career total			420	190	60	31	31	14	511	235

=== International goals ===
Scores and results list East Germany's goal tally first, score column indicates score after each Gütschow goal.

List of international goals scored by Torsten Gütschow
No.	Date	Venue	Opponent	Score	Result	Competition
1	15 February 1984	Olympic Stadium, Athens, Greece	Greece		3–1	Friendly
2	12 September 1984	Georgi-Dimitroff-Stadion, Zwickau, East Germany	Greece		1–0	Friendly

== Honours ==
=== Clubs ===
Dynamo Dresden

- DDR-Oberliga: 1988–89, 1989–90
- FDGB-Pokal: 1981–82, 1983–84, 1984–85, 1989–90

Galatasaray

- Süper Lig: 1992–93
- Turkish Cup: 1992–93

=== Individual ===
- East German Footballer of the Year: 1991
