= 1995–96 KFC Uerdingen 05 season =

KFC Uerdingen 05
1995–96 season
- Manager: Friedhelm Funkel
- Stadium: Grotenburg-Stadion
- Bundesliga: 18th (relegated)
- DFB-Pokal: Second round
- Top goalscorer: Erik Meijer (11)

== Season summary ==
After Bayer AG withdrew their sponsorship, Uerdingen was reformed as Krefelder Fußball-Club Uerdingen 05. However, without Bayer's sponsorship the club struggled financially and they were ultimately relegated. As of 2016, this remains the club's last top-flight season.

== First team squad ==
Squad at end of season

Note: Flags indicate national team as defined under FIFA eligibility rules; some limited exceptions apply. Players may hold more than one non-FIFA nationality.

No.	Pos.	Nation	Player
1	GK	GER	Bernd Dreher
2	DF	GER	Helmut Rahner
3	DF	DEN	Jan Heintze
4	DF	GER	Stephan Paßlack
5	DF	GER	Heiko Peschke
6	MF	BUL	Zlatko Yankov
7	FW	CZE	Günter Bittengel
8	MF	GER	Axel Jüptner
9	FW	USA	John van Buskirk
10	MF	GER	Horst Steffen

No.	Pos.	Nation	Player
11	DF	GER	Heiko Laeßig
12	DF	GER	Sebastian Hahn
13	DF	TUR	Mustafa Doğan (Note: Doğan was born in Isparta, Turkey, but also qualified to represent Germany internationally and would make his international debut for Germany in July 1999.)
14	MF	GER	Marcus Wedau
16	GK	GER	Alexander Bade
17	MF	GER	Gerd Kühn
18	FW	NED	Erik Meijer
19	DF	GER	Uwe Grauer
20	MF	GER	Michael Lusch

=== Left club during season ===
Note: Flags indicate national team as defined under FIFA eligibility rules; some limited exceptions apply. Players may hold more than one non-FIFA nationality.

No.	Pos.	Nation	Player
9	FW	GER	Rainer Krieg (to Fortuna Köln)
21	MF	POL	Michał Probierz (to SG Wattenscheid 09)

No.	Pos.	Nation	Player
22	GK	GER	Simon Jentzsch (to Karlsruhe)
