= Maglica =

Maglica is a surname. Notable people with the surname include:

- Anthony Maglica (born 1930), American businessman
- Anton Maglica (born 1991), Bosnian-born Croatian footballer
- Matej Maglica (born 1998), Croatian footballer
- Nikica Maglica (born 1965), Croatian footballer and manager
