= Dirk Oberritter =

German former professional footballer (born 1972)

Personal information
- Date of birth: 10 July 1972 (age 54)
- Place of birth: East Germany
- Height: 1.83 m (6 ft 0 in)
- Position: Defender

Team information
- Current team: SV Wesenitztal

Youth career
- 1986–1992: Dynamo Dresden

Senior career*
Years	Team	Apps	(Gls)
1992–1995	Dynamo Dresden	2	(0)
1995–1996	VfB Leipzig	1	(0)
1996–2001	Dynamo Dresden	118	(2)
2002	Stahl Riesa	12	(0)
2002–2003	FV Dresden 06	26	(0)
2003–	SV Wesenitztal		
Total		159	(2)
- * Club domestic league appearances and goals

Dirk Oberritter (born 10 July 1972) is a German former professional footballer.

As a defender, Oberritter began his career with Dynamo Dresden, making his debut as a substitute for Dirk Zander in a 1–1 draw with FC Saarbrücken in the Bundesliga in September 1992. He made one more appearance for Dynamo during the 1994–95 season but was part of a mass exodus from Dynamo in the summer of 1995, after the club had been relegated to the Regionalliga Nordost.

He signed for Dynamo's Saxony rivals VfB Leipzig, but was back at Dynamo after only six months and one league appearance. He spent a further six years with the club, playing in the Regionalliga and the NOFV-Oberliga Süd, but his latter years were marred by injury. After brief spells with Stahl Riesa and FV Dresden 06, Oberritter's senior career ended, although he continued to play for SV Wesenitztal of the Bezirksliga.
