= Jacek Cyzio =

Polish association football player

Personal information
- Date of birth: 6 September 1968 (age 58)
- Place of birth: Chrzanów, Poland
- Height: 1.82 m (6 ft 0 in)
- Position: Forward

Youth career
- –1982: Górnik Libiąż
- 1982–1985: Cracovia

Senior career*
Years	Team	Apps	(Gls)
1985	Cracovia	0	(0)
1985–1989	Pogoń Szczecin	70	(16)
1989–1991	Legia Warsaw	53	(7)
1991	Pogoń Szczecin		
1991–1993	Trabzonspor	54	(13)
1993–1995	Karşıyaka	29	(1)
1995–1996	Pogoń Szczecin	28	(0)
1996	Zagłębie Lubin	5	(0)
1997–1998	Wawel Kraków		
1999	Olimpia Warsaw		
1999–2002	Okęcie Warsaw		

International career
1989	Poland U21	1	(0)

Managerial career
- 2004–2005: Okęcie Warsaw
- 2005–2007: Pelikan Łowicz
- 2007–2008: Milan Milanówek
- 2008: Ostrovia Ostrów Mazowiecka
- 2011: Start Otwock
- 2011–2012: KS Łomianki
- 2013: Bzura Chodaków
- 2014–2015: Okęcie Warsaw
- * Club domestic league appearances and goals

Jacek Cyzio (born 6 September 1968) is a Polish football manager and former professional player who played as a forward.

== Honours ==
Legia Warsaw

- Polish Cup: 1989–90

Trabzonspor

- Turkish Cup: 1991–92
