= Werner Rank =

German footballer

Personal information
- Date of birth: 15 June 1968 (age 58)
- Place of birth: Herrieden, West Germany
- Height: 1.83 m (6 ft 0 in)
- Position: Striker

Youth career
- SG Herrieden
- SpVgg Ansbach
- –1992: 1. FC Nürnberg

Senior career*
Years	Team	Apps	(Gls)
1992	Blau-Weiß Berlin	10	(1)
1992–1993	BSV Brandeburg	27	(20)
1993–1995	Dynamo Dresden	12	(0)
1995–1997	Rot-Weiß Erfurt	31	(4)
1997–2000	FC Augsburg	64	(24)
2000–2001	VfR Mannheim	11	(6)
2001–2006	TSV Crailsheim		
- * Club domestic league appearances and goals

Werner Rank (born 15 June 1968) is a German former footballer.
