= Reinhard Stumpf =

German footballer (born 1961)

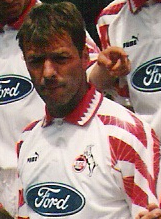

Personal information
- Full name: Reinhard Karl Stumpf
- Date of birth: 26 November 1961 (age 64)
- Place of birth: Lieblos, West Germany
- Height: 1.91 m (6 ft 3 in)
- Position: Centre-back

Team information
- Current team: Bangladesh (assistant)

Youth career
- SpVgg Dietesheim

Senior career*
Years	Team	Apps	(Gls)
1984–1985	Kickers Offenbach	21	(0)
1985–1986	Karlsruher SC	9	(1)
1986–1989	Kickers Offenbach	63	(2)
1989–1992	1. FC Kaiserslautern	65	(1)
1992–1994	Galatasaray	44	(2)
1994–1996	1. FC Köln	21	(0)
1996	Brummel Sendai	13	(2)
1997	Hannover 96	9	(0)

Managerial career
- 1997–2000: 1. FC Kaiserslautern (assistant)
- 2000–2002: 1. FC Kaiserslautern
- 2002–2004: 1. FC Kaiserslautern (assistant)
- 2004–2005: VfL Wolfsburg (assistant)
- 2005–2007: Galatasaray (assistant)
- 2007: Gençlerbirliği
- 2009–2011: Al-Hilal U21
- 2011: Club Sportif Sfaxien
- 2012: Wacker Burghausen
- 2013: Al-Hilal U21
- 2014–2015: Al Shabab
- 2015: Al-Ettifaq
- 2021–2022: Al-Diriyah
- 2026–: Bangladesh (assistant)
- * Club domestic league appearances and goals

Reinhard Karl Stumpf (born 26 November 1961) is a German football manager and former player who is the assistant coach of the Bangladesh national team. He played as a centre-back.

== Playing career ==
Stumpf's active career as a professional footballer encompassed a total of 13 years. In 1984, he made his first appearances in the 2. Bundesliga with Kickers Offenbach. After a short stint with Karlsruher SC, he once again returned to Offenbach in 1987. In 1989, 1. FC Kaiserslautern called him up to the Bundesliga. With Kaiserslautern, Stumpf won the DFB-Pokal in 1990 and the German Championship in 1991. His cup win also provided a football novelty: only a few hours earlier, his sister Daniela Stumpf had won the women's cup competition with FSV Frankfurt on exactly the same pitch. In 1992, Stumpf joined Galatasaray and went on to win the double of Süper Lig title and Turkish Cup in 1993. In 1994, he added yet another Turkish league title to his résumé. Following this success, he returned to Germany. After playing two more seasons at 1. FC Köln, he went to Japan's Brumell Sendai, only to stay there for less than six months. Back in Germany, he joined Hannover 96’s minor league team in 1997 before ending his active professional career here.

== Coaching career ==
As assistant coach under Otto Rehhagel at 1. FC Kaiserslautern, Stumpf's coaching career kicked off seamlessly. After Rehhagel's resignation in October 2000, Stumpf became head coach, Andreas Brehme taking over as the Red Devils team manager. In 2002, however, Reinhard Stumpf was dismissed. Between September 2002 and May 2007, he worked as assistant coach under Erik Gerets – first until February 2004 at 1. FC Kaiserslautern, which rehired him after his earlier dismissal, followed by one more year at VfL Wolfsburg until 2005. The duo's last stop was a two-year stint with renowned Turkish club Galatasaray, winning the 2005–06 Super Lig. In September 2007, Stumpf succeeded Fuat Çapa as head coach at Gençlerbirliği. His contract, however, was already ended at the end of October. In August 2009, he once again became assistant coach under Erik Gerets, this time at Al-Hilal in the Saudi Professional League. In 2010, he won the Saudi Championship as well as the Crown Prince Cup at Al-Hilal. Following Geret's departure in October 2010, he worked as interim head coach for the professional team before taking over Al-Hilal's U21 team in November 2010. In September 2011 he signed a contract as head coach at Tunisian side Club Sportif Sfaxien.

On 29 December 2011, Sfaxien released Stumpf due to the German's inability to communicate adequately with his underperforming players.

On 5 January 2012, he succeeded Rudi Bommer as manager of German 3. Liga club Wacker Burghausen. In July 2013, Stumpf became head coach of Al-Hilal's U21 team again.

In October 2014, Al Shabab sacked José Morais and was replaced by Stumpf on the bench of Al Shabab. In summer 2015 he was named as head coach of Al-Ettifaq.

On 21 October 2021, Stumpf was appointed as manager of Al-Diriyah. On 2 February 2022, Stumpf resigned from his post as manager.

In August 2026, Stumpf was appointed assistant coach of the Bangladesh national team on a one-year contract.

== Managerial statistics ==
As of 13 January 2020

Team	Nat	From	To	Record								
Team	Nat	From	To	M	W	D	L	GF	GA	GD	Win %	Ref.
Al-Shabab	Saudi Arabia	9 October 2014	21 December 2014	7	3	2	2	6	6	+0	42.86	
Al-Ettifaq	Saudi Arabia	8 July 2015	2015	15	6	6	3	20	9	+11	40.00	

== Honours ==
=== As player ===
1. FC Kaiserslautern'

- Bundesliga: 1990–91
- DFB-Pokal: 1989–90

Galatasaray Istanbul

- Süper Lig: 1992–93, 1993–94
- Turkish Cup: 1992–93

=== As manager ===
Al Hilal U21

- League Prince Faisal Cup: 2014

=== As assistant manager ===
Al Hilal

- Saudi Championship: 2010
- Crown Prince Cup: 2010

Galatasaray Istanbul

- Süper Lig: 2005–06
