= Frank Schulze =

German former footballer (born 1970)

Personal information
- Date of birth: 31 March 1970 (age 56)
- Place of birth: Riesa, East Germany
- Position: Goalkeeper

Youth career
- –1981: Stahl Riesa
- 1981–1987: Dynamo Dresden

Senior career*
Years	Team	Apps	(Gls)
1987–1989	Dynamo Dresden II	38	(0)
1988–1994	Dynamo Dresden	3	(0)
1990–1991	→ FFC Viktoria (loan)	20	(0)
Total		61	(0)

International career
1990	Germany U-21	1	(0)
Medal record
Dynamo Dresden
Winner	DDR-Oberliga	1989
Winner	DDR-Oberliga	1990
Winner	FDGB Pokal	1990
- * Club domestic league appearances and goals

Frank Schulze (born 31 March 1970) is a German former footballer who played as a goalkeeper.

== Career ==
Schulze played as a youth for his hometown club, Stahl Riesa, before joining Dynamo Dresden at age 11. He eventually made it through to the first-team, and made three league appearances in the 1989–90 season as third choice 'keeper (behind Thomas Köhler and Ronny Teuber) as Dynamo won the DDR-Oberliga. He also played in the East German Cup final, a 3–0 win over Dynamo Schwerin which completed the double for Dresden.

Schulze spent the 1990–91 season on loan at Viktoria Frankfurt (Oder), and made 20 appearances as the side finished bottom of the NOFV-Oberliga. The league, which had been renamed after German reunification, was used to decide how East German teams would be placed in the unified league system, and Frankfurt's position saw them remain in the NOFV-Oberliga, which would now be at the third tier. Schulze returned to Dynamo Dresden, who had qualified for the Bundesliga, where he spent three years without making an appearance, before retiring in 1994.

Internationally, Schulze played for East Germany at youth level, and was considered for the Olympic team's qualification campaign for the 1992 tournament, before reunification brought an end to it. Following this, he won one cap for the Germany under-21 team in 1990.
