= Falko Götz =

German football player and manager

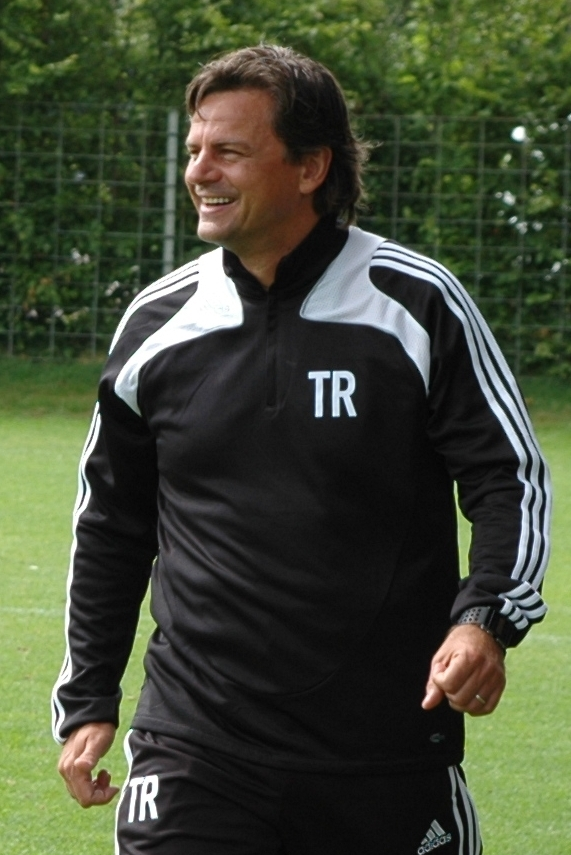
- Götz coaching Holstein Kiel in 2009

Personal information
- Birth name: Falko Götz
- Date of birth: 26 March 1962 (age 64)
- Place of birth: Rodewisch, East Germany
- Height: 1.81 m (5 ft 11 in)
- Positions: Attacking midfielder; forward

Youth career
- 1969–1971: FC Vorwärts Berlin
- 1971–1979: Berliner FC Dynamo

Senior career*
Years	Team	Apps	(Gls)
1979–1983	Berliner FC Dynamo	40	(12)
1984–1988	Bayer Leverkusen	115	(26)
1988–1992	1. FC Köln	125	(19)
1992–1994	Galatasaray	51	(16)
1994–1996	1. FC Saarbrücken	30	(5)
1996–1997	Hertha BSC	16	(0)
Total		377	(78)

International career
1979–1980	East Germany U18 (de)	23	(6)
1980–1982	East Germany U21	15	(1)

Managerial career
- 1997–2000: Hertha BSC II
- 2002: Hertha BSC (caretaker)
- 2003–2004: 1860 Munich
- 2004–2007: Hertha BSC
- 2009: Holstein Kiel
- 2011: Vietnam
- 2011: Vietnam U23
- 2013–2014: Erzgebirge Aue
- 2015–2016: 1. FC Saarbrücken
- 2016: FSV Frankfurt
- * Club domestic league appearances and goals

Falko Götz (born 26 March 1962) is a German football manager and former player. Since 2019, he works as a scout for Bayer Leverkusen.

== Playing career ==
Götz began playing football for FC Vorwärts Berlin in 1969. When FC Vorwärts Berlin was relocated to Frankfurt an der Oder in 1971, he joined the youth department of BFC Dynamo two years later. However, Götz was not allowed to attend an elite Children and Youth Sports School (KJS), where talents of BFC Dynamo were normally enrolled. The problem for Götz was allegedly that he had family members in West Germany and thus West German affiliation. However, his talent could not be ignored. Götz rose through the youth academy of BFC Dynamo and eventually made his professional debut for the BFC Dynamo in the 1979-80 season at the age of 17. Götz would come to win several league titles in a row with BFC Dynamo.

The day before a European Cup match against Partizan Belgrade in 1983, he escaped and defected to West Germany along with teammate Dirk Schegel. BFC Dynamo refused to allow him to cancel his contract, and on this technicality he was banned from playing professional football by FIFA for one year, but was able to stay in the West Germany. Götz joined Bayer Leverkusen, where he stayed for five years and won the UEFA Cup in 1988. He scored in the second leg of the final against Espanyol, one of three goals needed to equal a 3–0 deficit. Bayer Leverkusen eventually went on to win the game on penalties. He soon moved on to 1. FC Köln and had spells with Galatasaray (1992–1994), 1. FC Saarbrücken (1994–1995) and Hertha BSC (1995–1997) before retiring as a football player. Götz then took up the role as manager of the reserve team of Hertha BSC, the Hertha BSC II.

== Coaching career ==
Götz started his coaching career at Hertha BSC II. He was briefly Hertha's caretaker manager during 2002, and was re-appointed as full-time manager in 2004, having managed 1860 München the previous season. Götz was sacked by Hertha on 10 April 2007. On 15 December 2008, Holstein Kiel announced Götz as head coach of the club and would take over during the winter break. Götz was dismissed on 17 September 2009.

In 2011, Götz was appointed as head coach of Vietnam. After some positive games in national-level team, however their under-23 team disappointed, and he was fired on 23 December 2011, just six months after taking charge.

On 29 April 2013, he was appointed as coach of Erzgebirge Aue. He was sacked on 2 September 2014.

He was hired by FSV Frankfurt on 11 April 2016.

== Career statistics ==
As of 9 March 2014

Team	From	To	Record					
Team	From	To	G	W	D	L	Win %	Ref.
Hertha BSC II	1 July 1997	30 June 2000	92	48	15	29	52.17	
Hertha BSC	7 February 2002	30 June 2002	13	9	1	3	69.23	
1860 München	12 March 2003	17 April 2004	41	12	10	19	29.27	
Hertha BSC	1 July 2004	10 April 2007	121	47	40	34	38.84	
Holstein Kiel	1 January 2009	17 September 2009	25	11	7	7	44.00	
Vietnam	6 June 2011	23 December 2011	5	3	0	2	60.00	
Erzgebirge Aue	29 April 2013	2 September 2014	28	9	5	14	32.14	
Total			325	139	78	108	42.77	—

== Honours ==
BFC Dynamo

- DDR Oberliga: 1980–81, 1981–82, 1982–83

BFC Dynamo also won the DDR-Oberliga title in 1984, but Götz had defected half-way through the season.

Bayer Leverkusen

- UEFA Cup: 1987–88

Galatasaray

- Turkish Super League: 1992–93, 1993–94
- Turkish Cup: 1992–93

== See also ==
- List of Soviet and Eastern Bloc defectors
