= Mustafa Kocabey =

Turkish professional footballer (born 1974)

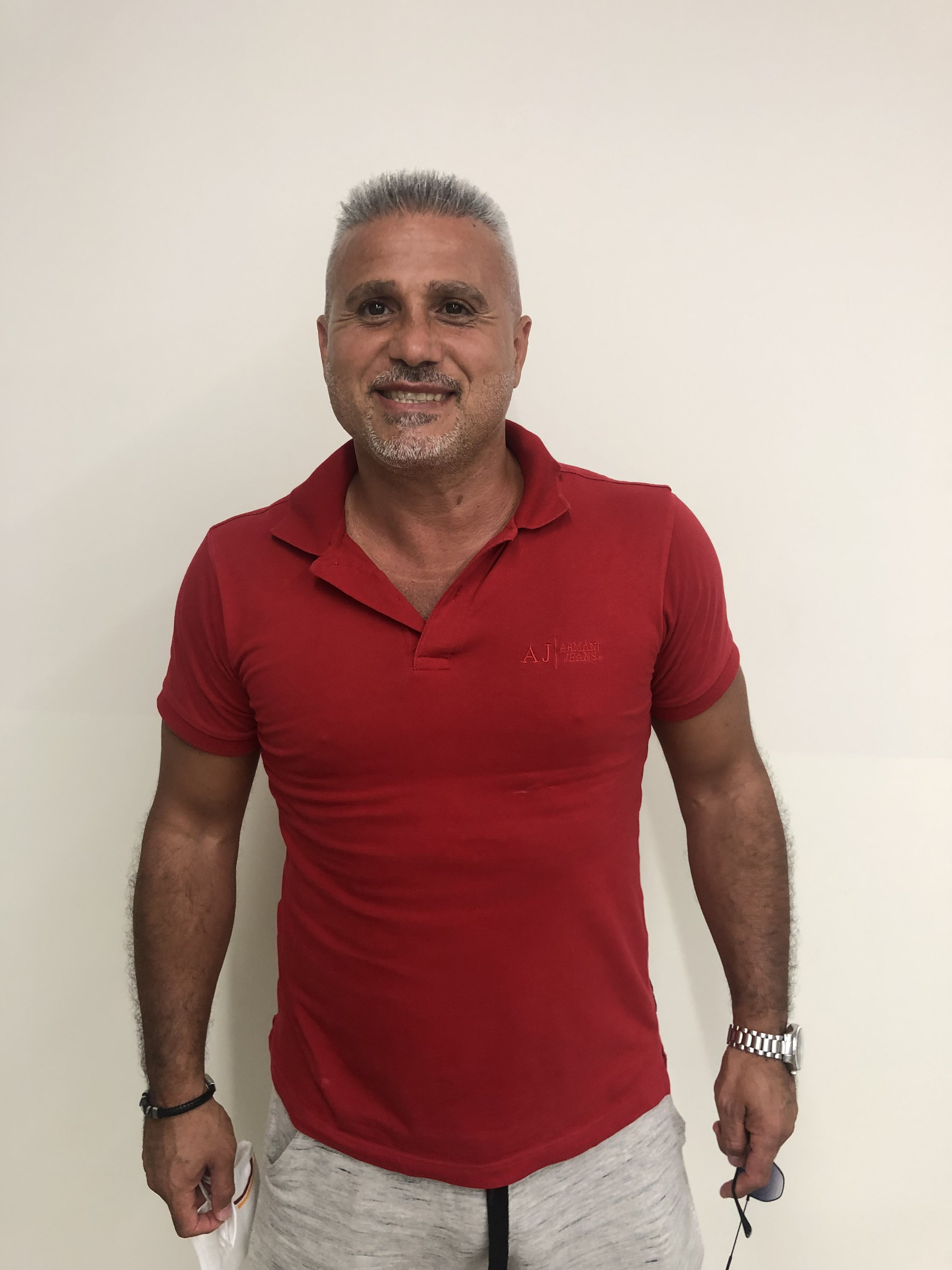
- Kocabey in 2021

Personal information
- Full name: Mustafa Kocabey
- Date of birth: 6 October 1974 (age 52)
- Place of birth: Istanbul, Turkey
- Height: 1.74 m (5 ft 9 in)
- Position: Striker

Team information
- Current team: Zara Belediyespor
- Number: 58

Youth career
- 1990–92: Galatasaray

Senior career*
Years	Team	Apps	(Gls)
1992–1994	Galatasaray	27	(10)
1994	→ Kocaelispor (loan)	2	(0)
1994–1996	Dardanelspor	62	(49)
1996–1998	Zeytinburnuspor	61	(30)
1998–1999	Kayserispor	34	(31)
1999–2002	Yozgatspor	77	(47)
2002	→ Samsunspor (loan)	8	(1)
2002	Konyaspor	12	(4)
2003	Manisaspor	14	(4)
2003–2004	Dardanelspor	13	(12)
2004	Kayserispor	13	(3)
2004–2005	Kayseri Erciyesspor	5	(2)
2005	Dardanelspor	16	(2)
2005–2006	Etimesgut Şekerspor	28	(28)
2006–2007	Dardanelspor	19	(3)
2007–2009	Beylerbeyispor	42	(30)
2009–2010	Turgutluspor	36	(19)
2010–2011	Balıkesirspor	11	(2)
2011	Tokatspor	13	(3)
2012	Tepecikspor	1	(1)
2012–	Zara Belediyespor	2	(4)

International career
- Turkey U18
- Turkey U20
- * Club domestic league appearances and goals

Mustafa Kocabey (born 6 October 1974) is a retired Turkish professional footballer.

He started his professional career in Galatasaray.

He scored in the final of the 1992 UEFA European Under-18 Championship, which Turkey U18 won. He subsequently played in the 1993 FIFA World Youth Championship.
