= Thomas Rath (footballer) =

German footballer

Personal information
- Date of birth: 26 July 1970 (age 56)
- Place of birth: Schwedt, Bezirk Frankfurt, East Germany
- Height: 1.87 m (6 ft 2 in)
- Position: Midfielder

Youth career
- PCK Schwedt
- FC Viktoria Frankfurt

Senior career*
Years	Team	Apps	(Gls)
1988–1991	FC Viktoria Frankfurt		
1991–1992	Hertha BSC	28	(5)
1992–1995	Dynamo Dresden	75	(6)
1995–1997	SC Freiburg	36	(2)
1997–2001	VfB Leipzig		

International career
	Germany U-21	2	(1)
- * Club domestic league appearances and goals

Thomas Rath (born 26 July 1970 in Schwedt) is a German former professional footballer who played as a midfielder for Hertha BSC, Dynamo Dresden, SC Freiburg and VfB Leipzig.

He was a part of the East German squad at the 1989 FIFA World Youth Championship, playing two matches.
