= Nikica Maglica =

Croatian former football player (born 1965)

Personal information
- Date of birth: 26 January 1965 (age 61)
- Place of birth: Brčko, SFR Yugoslavia
- Height: 1.77 m (5 ft 10 in)
- Position: Defender

Youth career
- 1987: Bečej

Senior career*
Years	Team	Apps	(Gls)
1988–1992	Proleter Zrenjanin	78	(2)
1992–1993	NK Zagreb	11	(0)
1993–1996	Dynamo Dresden	39	(4)
1996–2001	Dresdner SC	155	(20)
2001–2004	OFC Neugersdorf	92	(2)
2004–2007	Dresdner SC	65	(9)

Managerial career
- 2007–2008: Dynamo Dresden II (assistant)
- 2009–2012: Dynamo Dresden (assistant)
- * Club domestic league appearances and goals

Nikica Maglica (born 26 January 1965) is a Croatian former football player who was the assistant manager of Dynamo Dresden from 2009 to 2011.

== Club career ==
Born in Brčko, SR Bosnia and Herzegovina (back then part of Yugoslavia), he started playing at FK Bečej, before moving to FK Proleter Zrenjanin where he played in the Yugoslav Second League until achieving promotion to the Yugoslav First League in 1990. He played with Proleter for two more seasons in Yugoslav top tier before moving to Croatia in summer 1992 and played with NK Zagreb in the 1992–93 Croatian First League.

In 1993, he moved to Germany and since then he has played with Dynamo Dresden, Dresdner SC and OFC Neugersdorf.

== Personal life ==
While living in Zrenjanin he married Sandra and has two daughters, Marina and Viktorija. He became a coach after retiring from playing.
