= Sergio Allievi =

German footballer

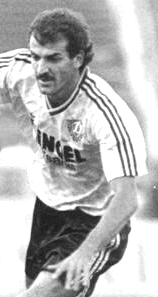

Personal information
- Date of birth: 17 January 1964 (age 62)
- Place of birth: Essen
- Height: 1.80 m (5 ft 11 in)
- Positions: Striker; midfielder

Senior career*
Years	Team	Apps	(Gls)
1984–1986	SG Wattenscheid 09	65	(22)
1986–1990	1. FC Kaiserslautern	112	(14)
1990–1992	Dynamo Dresden	35	(4)
1992–1993	SpVgg Unterhaching	26	(5)
1994–1995	Fortuna Düsseldorf	26	(3)
1995–1999	SG Wattenscheid 09	65	(3)
- * Club domestic league appearances and goals

Sergio Allievi (born 17 January 1964) is a retired German football player.
