= René Groth =

German footballer

Personal information
- Date of birth: 9 June 1972 (age 54)
- Place of birth: Dresden, East Germany
- Height: 1.81 m (5 ft 11 1/2 in)
- Positions: Defender; midfielder

Youth career
- 1977–1991: Dynamo Dresden

Senior career*
Years	Team	Apps	(Gls)
1991–1995	Dynamo Dresden II		
1992–1995	Dynamo Dresden	1	(0)
1995–1997	FSV Zwickau	48	(1)
1997–2000	Dynamo Dresden	53	(0)
2000–2002	VfB Leipzig	30	(2)
2002–2005	FV Süd-West Dresden		
Total		132	(3)
- * Club domestic league appearances and goals

René Groth (born 9 June 1972) is a German former footballer who played for Dynamo Dresden, FSV Zwickau and VfB Leipzig.
