= Wolfram Wagner (footballer) =

German footballer

Personal information
- Date of birth: 24 June 1972 (age 54)
- Height: 1.76 m (5 ft 9 in)
- Position: Midfielder

Youth career
- –1985: Lokomotive Dresden
- 1985–1992: Dynamo Dresden

Senior career*
Years	Team	Apps	(Gls)
1992–1993	Dynamo Dresden	2	(0)
1993–1994	Dresdner SC		
- * Club domestic league appearances and goals

Wolfram Wagner (born 24 June 1972) is a German retired footballer who played as a midfielder.
