= 1992–93 Turkish Cup =

Türkiye Kupası

Tournament details
- Country: Turkey
- Teams: 141

Final positions
- Champions: Galatasaray
- Runners-up: Beşiktaş

Tournament statistics
- Matches played: 143
- Goals scored: 481 (3.36 per match)
- Top goal scorer(s): Ertuğrul Sağlam; Levent Eriş (5 goals each)

The 1992–93 Turkish Cup was the 31st edition of the tournament that determined the association football Süper Lig Turkish Cup (Turkish: Türkiye Kupası) champion under the auspices of the Turkish Football Federation (Turkish: Türkiye Futbol Federasyonu; TFF). champion under the auspices of the Turkish Football Federation (Turkish: Türkiye Futbol Federasyonu; TFF). Galatasaray successfully contested Beşiktaş on both legs of the finals. The results of the tournament also determined which clubs would be promoted or relegated.

== First round ==
Team 1	Score	Team 2
Adana Polisgücü	6–3	Erciyesspor
Keçiörengücü	4–2	Zonguldakspor
Küçükköyspor	0–2	Anadoluhisarı İdman Yurdu
Balıkesirspor	2–1 (aet)	Ayvalıkgücü
Göztepe	1–3	İzmirspor
Adanaspor	5–0	İskenderunspor
Yeni Afyonspor	3–2	Marmarisspor
Akçaabat Sebatspor	2–1	Çaykur Rizespor
Alpetspor	1–2	Yeni Turgutluspor
Altınordu	0–0 (4–2 p)	Denizlispor
Ormanspor	1–2 (aet)	Etibank SAS
Antalya Köy Hizmetleri	3–0	Kemer Belediyespor
Antalyaspor	0–0 (2–3 p)	Alanyaspor
Bandırmaspor	1–2	Üsküdar Anadolu
Bartınspor	2–1	Erdemir Ereğlispor
Bergamaspor	3–0	TARİŞ
Bulancakspor	1–1 (7–6 p)	Bayburtspor
Sümerbank Merinosspor	3–0	Mustafakemalpaşaspor
Çayelispor	1–4	Trabzon PTT
Çengelköy	0–2	Galata
Çubukspor	0–2	Aksarayspor
Çanakkale Dardanelspor	8–0	Eskişehir Şekerspor
Diyarbakırspor	2–1	Vanspor
Edirnespor	1–0	Çorluspor
Eskişehirspor	2–0	Bozüyükspor
Karagümrük	3–1	Gönenspor
Feriköy	3–1	Sümerbank Beykoz
Gaziosmanpaşa	1–2	Yalovaspor
Gebzespor	4–2	Mudanyaspor
Giresunspor	3–1	Artvin Hopaspor
Hatayspor	3–2 (aet)	Malatyaspor
İnegölspor	0–1	Boluspor
Kadıköyspor	0–2	Merzifonspor
Kahramanmaraşspor	3–4	Adana Demirspor
Karamanspor	2–0	MKE Kırıkkalespor
Kartalspor	3–2	Eyüpspor
Kasımpaşa	0–1	Küçükçekmecespor
Kozan Belediyespor	3–1	Osmaniyespor
Kuşadasıspor	3–0	Akhisar Belediyespor
Kütahyaspor	2–1	Tarsus İdman Yurdu
Manisaspor	2–1	Bucaspor
Mersin İdman Yurdu	0–0 (3–4 p)	Ispartaspor
Muğlaspor	2–1	Yeni Nazillispor
Muşspor	2–1	Elazığspor
Nevşehirspor	4–0	Ankara Demirspor
Niğdespor	2–1 (aet)	Adana Gençlerbirliği
Orduspor	7–0	Ünyespor
Sakaryaspor	5–0	Düzce Doğsanspor
Samsunspor	4–0	Erzurumspor
Siirt Köy Hizmetleri	2–2 (4–3 p)	Batman Belediyespor
Sivasspor	2–0	Çorumspor
Şanlıurfaspor	7–0	Silvanspor
TKİ Tavşanlı Linyitspor	4–0	Uşakspor
Tekirdağspor	2–0	Keşanspor
Ümraniyespor	3–1	Bayrampaşa
Yeni Salihlispor	0–3	Sökespor
Yeni Yozgatspor	1–0	DÇ Karabükspor
Yüksekova Belediyespor	2–0	Mardinspor
Zeytinburnuspor	3–1	İstanbulspor
Bafraspor	2–3	PTT
Kars Köy Hizmetleri	0–1	Ağrıspor
Şekerspor	1–2	Petrol Ofisi

== Second round ==
Team 1	Score	Team 2
Petrol Ofisi	3–0	Ispartaspor
Adanaspor	7–0	Muşspor
Alanyaspor	3–1	Kütahyaspor
Altınordu	3–2 (aet)	Balıkesirspor
Bartınspor	3–1	Merzifonspor
Çanakkale Dardanelspor	5–0	Bergamaspor
Diyarbakırspor	4–3	Hatayspor
Edirnespor	2–4	Tekirdağspor
Eskişehirspor	2–1 (aet)	Boluspor
Feriköy	3–2	Anadoluhisarı İdman Yurdu
Galata	4–2	Ümraniyespor
Giresunspor	2–1	Bulancakspor
Kozan Belediyespor	2–0	Adana Polisgücü
Kuşadasıspor	3–1	Yeni Turgutluspor
Küçükçekmecespor	1–2 (aet)	Kartalspor
Manisaspor	1–0	Muğlaspor
Nevşehirspor	0–1	Karamanspor
Niğdespor	1–2 (aet)	Aksarayspor
Samsunspor	4–0	Akçaabat Sebatspor
Etibank SAS	1–1 (4–3 p)	Antalya Köy Hizmetleri
Siirt Köy Hizmetleri	4–2	Adana Demirspor
Sivasspor	1–0	Trabzon PTT
Sökespor	1–2	İzmirspor
Şanlıurfaspor	1–2 (aet)	Batman Petrolspor
TKİ Tavşanlı Linyitspor	2–1	Yeni Afyonspor
Yalovaspor	2–1 (aet)	Sakaryaspor
Yeni Yozgatspor	2–1	PTT
Yüksekova Belediyespor	w/o	Ağrıspor
Zeytinburnuspor	3–0	Karagümrük
Sümerbank Merinosspor	4–3	Gebzespor
Keçiörengücü	0–0 (4–3 p)	Orduspor

== Third round ==
Team 1	Score	Team 2
Altınordu	3–4	İzmirspor
Samsunspor	2–0	Petrol Ofisi
Yüksekova Belediyespor	2–1 (aet)	Batman Petrolspor
Adanaspor	0–1	Alanyaspor
Bartınspor	2–1	Giresunspor
Çanakkale Dardanelspor	2–1 (aet)	Tekirdağspor
Galata	2–3	Feriköy
Kozan Belediyespor	2–0	Karamanspor
Manisaspor	1–1 (7–8 p)	Eskişehirspor
Etibank SAS	2–1 (aet)	Kuşadasıspor
Siirt Köy Hizmetleri	2–1	Diyarbakırspor
Sivasspor	1–3	Aksarayspor
TKİ Tavşanlı Linyitspor	2–1	Sümerbank Merinosspor
Üsküdar Anadolu	1–2	Yalovaspor
Yeni Yozgatspor	2–1	Keçiörengücü
Zeytinburnuspor	0–1	Kartalspor

== Fourth round ==
Team 1	Score	Team 2
Alanyaspor	3–1	Siirt Köy Hizmetleri
Bartınspor	1–0	Aksarayspor
Eskişehirspor	2–1	İzmirspor
Feriköy	0–0 (2–4 p)	Çanakkale Dardanelspor
TKİ Tavşanlı Linyitspor	2–1	Etibank SAS
Yalovaspor	3–2 (aet)	Kartalspor
Yeni Yozgatspor	1–2	Samsunspor
Yüksekova Belediyespor	w/o	Kozan Belediyespor

== Fifth round ==
Team 1	Score	Team 2
Alanyaspor	1–0	Bakırköyspor
Aydınspor	3–1	Eskişehirspor
Kayserispor	0–0 (4–2 p)	Karşıyaka
Samsunspor	0–1	Çanakkale Dardanelspor
TKİ Tavşanlı Linyitspor	1–3	Gaziantepspor
Konyaspor	1–3	Gençlerbirliği
Yalovaspor	2–3 (aet)	Bartınspor
Yüksekova Belediyespor	0–2	Sarıyer

== Sixth round ==
Team 1	Score	Team 2
Bartınspor	1–4	Galatasaray
Çanakkale Dardanelspor	1–0 (aet)	Ankaragücü
Fenerbahçe	5–2	Gençlerbirliği
Gaziantepspor	1–3	Bursaspor
Kocaelispor	6–2	Alanyaspor
Sarıyer	6–2	Altay
Trabzonspor	2–1	Kayserispor
Beşiktaş	3–1	Aydınspor

== Quarter-finals ==
Team 1	Score	Team 2
Beşiktaş	3–0	Sarıyer
Bursaspor	0–2	Fenerbahçe
Galatasaray	2–0	Çanakkale Dardanelspor
Trabzonspor	4–1	Kocaelispor

== Semi-finals ==
=== Summary table ===
Team 1	Agg.	Team 2	1st leg	2nd leg
Galatasaray	4–3	Trabzonspor	3–0	1–3
Beşiktaş	2–1	Fenerbahçe	1–0	1–1

=== 1st leg ===
10 February 1993 Semi-final	Galatasaray	3–0	Trabzonspor	Istanbul
13:30 EET (UTC+02)	Mustafa 34'; Tugay 62'; Götz 67' (pen.)			Stadium: Ali Sami Yen Stadium; Referee: Erman Toroğlu

10 February 1993 Semi-final	Beşiktaş	1–0	Fenerbahçe	Istanbul
17:00 EET (UTC+02)	Feyyaz 28'			Stadium: BJK İnönü Stadium; Referee: Ahmet Çakar

=== 2nd leg ===
17 March 1993 Semi-final	Trabzonspor	3–1	Galatasaray	Trabzon
12:00 EET (UTC+02)	Chelepnitski 8' 44'; Orhan 88'		Hakan 84'	Stadium: Hüseyin Avni Aker Stadium; Referee: Sadık Ceyhan Deda

17 March 1993 Semi-final	Fenerbahçe	1–1	Beşiktaş	Istanbul
13:30 EET (UTC+02)	Tanju 56'		Madida 67'	Stadium: Şükrü Saracoğlu Stadium; Referee: Erman Toroğlu

== Final ==
=== 1st leg ===
24 March 1993 Final	Galatasaray	1–0	Beşiktaş	Istanbul, Turkey
14:00 EET (UTC+02)	Erdal 44'			Stadium: Ali Sami Yen Stadium; Referee: Bülent Yavuz

=== 2nd leg ===
7 April 1993 Final	Beşiktaş	2–2	Galatasaray	Istanbul, Turkey
18:00 EEST (UTC+03)	Feyyaz 44'; Ulvi 84'		Hakan 2'; Arif 26'	Stadium: BJK İnönü Stadium; Referee: Ahmet Çakar
