= Oliver Pagé =

German footballer

Personal information
- Date of birth: 10 April 1971 (age 55)
- Place of birth: Nickenich, West Germany
- Height: 1.91 m (6 ft 3 in)
- Position: Centre-back

Youth career
- 1986–1987: SG Andernach
- 1987–1988: Bayer 04 Leverkusen

Senior career*
Years	Team	Apps	(Gls)
1988–1990	Bayer 04 Leverkusen II		
1988–1991	Bayer 04 Leverkusen	6	(1)
1991–1992	Dynamo Dresden	3	(0)
1992–1994	Rot-Weiss Essen		
- * Club domestic league appearances and goals

Oliver Pagé (born 10 April 1971) is a German former footballer who played as a centre-back. He is best known for playing in the Bundesliga with Bayer 04 Leverkusen and Dynamo Dresden.

== Career ==
Pagé made 9 appearances in the Bundesliga for Bayer 04 Leverkusen and Dynamo Dresden, scoring once.
