= Vladan Milovanović =

Serbian footballer

Personal information
- Date of birth: 7 July 1970 (age 56)
- Place of birth: SFR Yugoslavia
- Height: 1.80 m (5 ft 11 in)
- Position: Forward

Youth career
- Red Star Belgrade

Senior career*
Years	Team	Apps	(Gls)
1990–1992	Napredak Kruševac	37	(7)
1992–1993	Dynamo Dresden	4	(0)
1993–1994	VfL Osnabrück	16	(11)
1994–1995	FSV Frankfurt	10	(4)
1995–1996	TuS Celle	25	(12)
1996–1998	Hannover 96	58	(49)
1998–2000	Eintracht Braunschweig	27	(11)
2000	Arminia Hannover	1	(0)
2001	Austria Lustenau	5	(0)
2001–2002	SV Babelsberg 03	18	(3)
Total		201	(97)
- * Club domestic league appearances and goals

Vladan Milovanović (Serbian Cyrillic: Владан Миловановић; born 7 July 1970) is a Serbian former professional footballer who played as a forward. He spent the majority of his footballing career in Germany.

== Career ==
Milovanović came through the youth categories of Red Star Belgrade, before playing for Napredak Kruševac in the Yugoslav Second League. He subsequently moved abroad to German side Dynamo Dresden in 1992. Over the following decade, Milovanović played for numerous lower league clubs, having his most prolific performances with Hannover 96 in the Regionalliga Nord. He also briefly played for Austria Lustenau in the Austrian Second League.
