= Gerd Kühn =

German footballer

Personal information
- Date of birth: 15 March 1968 (age 58)
- Place of birth: Germany
- Height: 1.80 m (5 ft 11 in)
- Position: Right midfielder

Youth career
- 1985–1987: Bayer Leverkusen

Senior career*
Years	Team	Apps	(Gls)
–1990	Preussen Krefeld		
1990–1992	Bayer 05 Uerdingen II		
1992–1998	KFC Uerdingen 05 (Note: Named Bayer 05 Uerdingen until summer 1995)	86	(1)
1998–1999	Rot-Weiß Oberhausen		
- * Club domestic league appearances and goals

Gerd Kühn (born 15 March 1968) is a German former professional footballer who played as a right midfielder.
