= Matthias Maucksch =

German former footballer (born 1969)

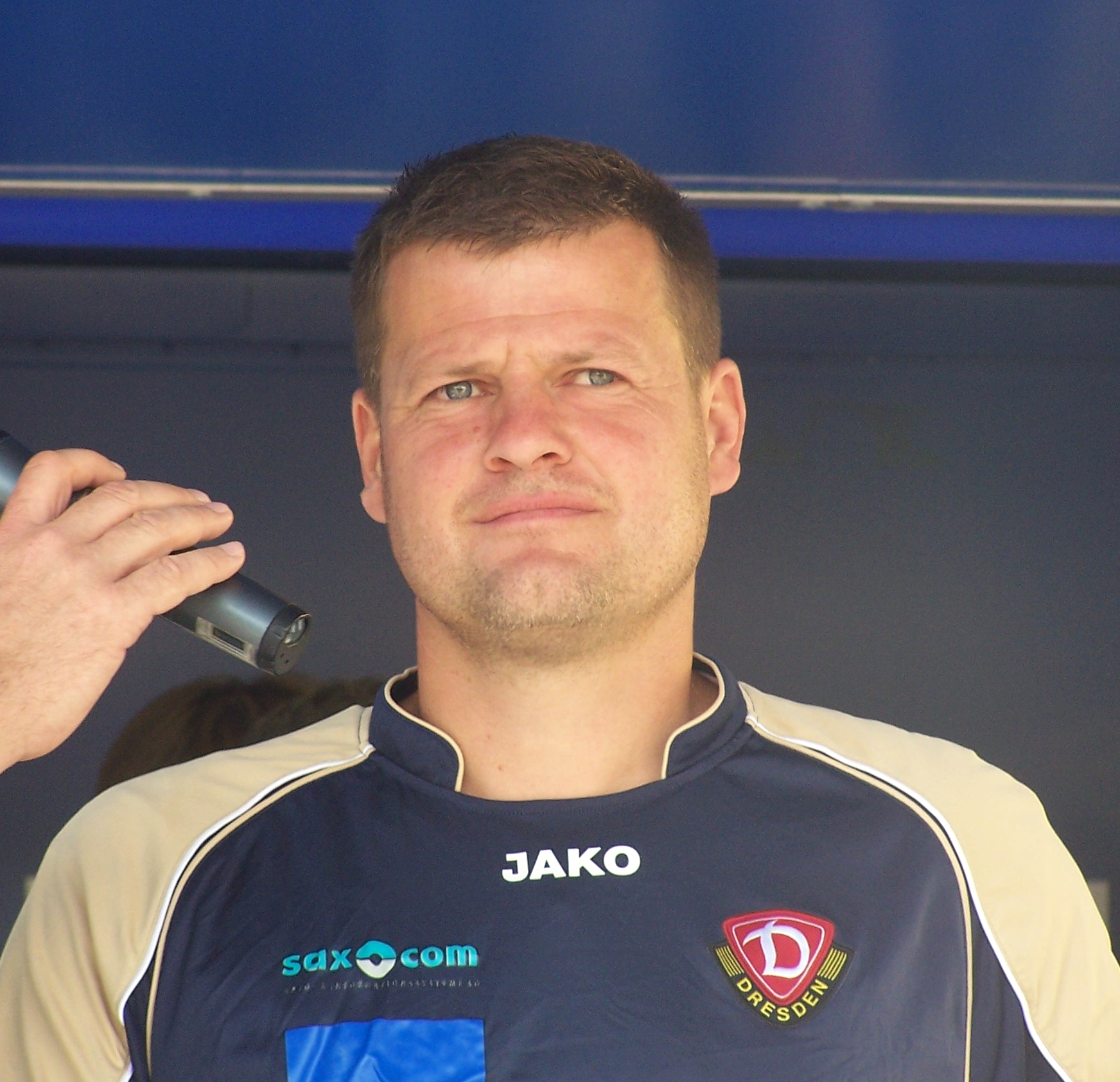
- Maucksch in 2008 while at Dynamo Dresden

Personal information
- Date of birth: 11 June 1969 (age 57)
- Place of birth: Dresden, East Germany
- Height: 1.81 m (5 ft 11 in)
- Position: Defender

Youth career
- 1976–1987: Dynamo Dresden

Senior career*
Years	Team	Apps	(Gls)
1987–1989	Dynamo Dresden II	45	(1)
1987–1995	Dynamo Dresden	167	(4)
1995–1997	VfL Wolfsburg	41	(5)
1997–1998	VfB Leipzig	27	(0)
1998–1999	1. FC Nürnberg	5	(0)
1999–2000	Energie Cottbus	5	(0)
2000–2004	FV Dresden 06	63	(3)
2004–2006	VfL Pirna-Copitz	45	(15)
Total		397	(28)

International career
1990	East Germany	1	(0)

Managerial career
- 2007: Döbelner SC
- 2007–2009: Dynamo Dresden II
- 2009: Dynamo Dresden (assistant)
- 2009–2011: Dynamo Dresden
- 2011: SG Dresden Striesen
- 2015–2016: FSV Union Fürstenwalde
- 2017–2018: FSV Union Fürstenwalde
- 2018: Sportfreunde Lotte
- 2019: BFC Dynamo
- * Club domestic league appearances and goals

Matthias Maucksch (born 11 June 1969) is a German former footballer who played as midfielder or defender and worked as a manager in different Teams of Germanys 4th and 3rd leagues.

== Playing career ==
Maucksch came through the youth system at Dynamo Dresden, and made his debut in the DDR-Oberliga in 1987. He stayed with Dynamo after reunification, and played in the Bundesliga for four seasons, his 118 appearances the club record at this level. After Dynamo's double relegation in 1995, he joined 2. Bundesliga side VfL Wolfsburg, where he remained for two years, leaving after their promotion to the Bundesliga. After one year back in Saxony with VfB Leipzig, he returned to the Bundesliga with 1. FC Nürnberg, but only made five league appearances and left after a year. After a similarly unproductive season with Energie Cottbus, he moved into amateur football in Saxony, playing for FV Dresden 06 and VfL Pirna-Copitz.

=== International career ===
He earned one cap for the East Germany national team, in one of the team's last games, a 3–0 defeat against France in 1990.

== Coaching career ==
After the end of his playing career, Maucksch went into coaching, taking over at Döbelner SC in early 2007. In October of the same year, he was appointed as manager of Dynamo Dresden's reserve team, replacing Jan Seifert, who had stepped up to the assistant manager's role. In his second season in charge, he led the team to victory in both the Landesliga Sachsen and the Sachsenpokal. Following this success, he was appointed as manager of Dynamo's first team in October 2009, after the sacking of Ruud Kaiser. Maucksch managed to steer the club clear of relegation, and in the following season within an outside chance of a playoff place, but was sacked in April 2011 after a run of five games without a win.

In the summer of 2018 he signed with Sportfreunde Lotte. He was sacked after just four games on 24 August 2018.

On 9 January 2019, Maucksch was appointed as the manager of BFC Dynamo on a contract until June 2020.

Just half a year later, at the end of the 2018–19 season, BFC Dynamo dissolved the contract with Matthias Maucksch by Maucksch's request.

== Honours ==
=== As player ===
- DDR-Oberliga: 1988–89, 1989–90
- FDGB-Pokal: 1989–90

=== As coach ===
- Landesliga Sachsen: 2009
- Sachsenpokal: 2009
