= Thomas Köhler (footballer) =

German footballer and coach

Personal information
- Date of birth: 17 June 1967 (age 59)
- Place of birth: East Germany
- Height: 1.94 m (6 ft 4 1/2 in)
- Position: Goalkeeper

Team information
- Current team: Dynamo Dresden (Goalkeeper coach)

Senior career*
| Years | Team | Apps | (Gls) |
| 1986–1988 | Rot-Weiß Erfurt | | |
| 1988–1989 | Soemtron Sömmerda | | |
| 1989–1991 | Dynamo Dresden | 17 | (0) |
| 1991 | Soemtron Sömmerda | 4 | (0) |
| 1991–1992 | Hansa Rostock | 0 | (0) |
| 1992–1995 | Sachsen Leipzig | 76 | (0) |
| 1995–1999 | Dynamo Dresden | 101 | (1) |
| 1999–2001 | Energie Cottbus | 0 | (0) |

Managerial career
- 2001–2005: Energie Cottbus (goalkeeper coach)
- 2005–2007: Energie Cottbus II
- 2007–2008: Energie Cottbus II (goalkeeper coach)
- 2008–2009: VfB Pößneck
- 2009–2010: Rot-Weiß Erfurt (goalkeeper coach)
- 2010–2013: Dynamo Dresden II
- 2010–: Dynamo Dresden (goalkeeper coach)
- * Club domestic league appearances and goals

Thomas Köhler (born 17 June 1967) is a German former footballer who is now the goalkeeper coach of Dynamo Dresden.
