= Jörg Stübner =

German footballer (1965–2019)

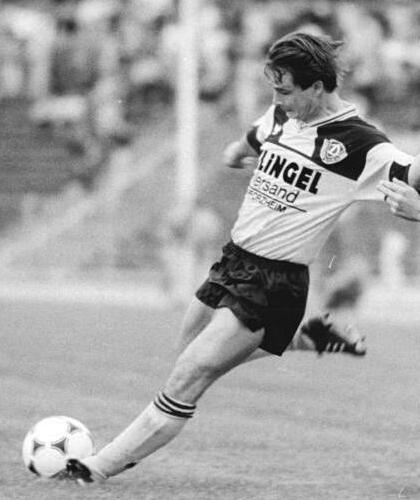
- Stübner playing for Dresden during the East German Cup final game in June 1990

Personal information
- Full name: Jörg Stübner
- Date of birth: 23 July 1965
- Place of birth: Freiberg, East Germany
- Date of death: 24 June 2019 (aged 53)
- Place of death: Dresden, Germany
- Height: 1.73 m (5 ft 8 in)
- Position: Midfielder

Youth career
- 1973–1979: Motor Halle
- 1979–1983: Dynamo Dresden

Senior career*
Years	Team	Apps	(Gls)
1983–1993	Dynamo Dresden	182	(14)
1993	Sachsen Leipzig	6	(1)
1994	FC Neubrandenburg	1	(0)

International career
?–?	East Germany Junior team	14	
?–?	East Germany Youth team	10	
1984–1990	East Germany	47	(1)
Medal record
Representing East Germany
Dynamo Dresden
Runner-up	DDR-Oberliga	1984
Runner-up	DDR-Oberliga	1985
Runner-up	DDR-Oberliga	1987
Winner	DDR-Oberliga	1989
Winner	DDR-Oberliga	1990
Winner	FDGB-Pokal	1984
Winner	FDGB-Pokal	1985
Winner	FDGB-Pokal	1990
- * Club domestic league appearances and goals

Jörg Stübner (23 July 1965 – 24 June 2019) was a German professional footballer who amassed 47 international caps for East Germany.

== Biography ==
Stübner began his career with BSG Motor Halle in 1973 then chose "his" SG Dynamo Dresden" over 1. FC Lokomotive Leipzig in 1979, where he was called "Stübs" by fans and teammates, scoring 14 goals in 182 league appearances. Stübner was twice DDR-Oberliga champion with the Dresden club, in 1989 and 1990, and three-time FDGB-Pokal winner in 1984, 1985 and 1990. In 1988–89 season, Dynamo reached the semi-finals of the UEFA Cup, where they were beaten by VfB Stuttgart. In total, Stübner played in 29 European games with the club, scoring two goals.

During his youth years, Stübner won the East Germany Student championship 1978–79 with Dynamo Dresden, beating 5–0 BFC Dynamo at the final in Gröditz. Then in July, he participated in VII.Kinder- und Jugendspartakiade 1979 Berlin, where Sven Förster and Ulf Kirsten (Dynamo Dresden), Andreas Thom (BFC Dynamo), Heiko Bonan (1. FC Magdeburg) too participated in. At the final on 28 July, Stübner, playing as a centre forward, and his teammates beat FC Vorwärts Frankfurt / Oder with his only goal of the match (45.). Dynamo Dresden received the gold medal. Under Klaus Sammer and Dieter Riedel, he also received the silver medal of Junior championship 1982–83. With East Germany Junior team, he participated in 1982 UEFA European Under-16 Championship. At the quarterfinal, Günter Rosenthal's East Germany met Berti Vogts's West Germany. During this period, Stübner has established himself as a midfielder more than a forward.

His first appearance for DDR-Oberliga was at the first matchday of the season 1983–84, Chemie Leipzig 1–1 Dynamo Dresden where he played for 90 minutes. He scored 2–1 lead goal (59.) at the 1984 FDGB-Pokal final on 8 June 1985, in full-filled Belin Stadion der Weltjugend. Hans-Jürgen Dörner took the free kick, Ralf Minge made a pass with header, Hans-Uwe Pilz touched and 19-year-old Stübner decided. Dynamo Dresden celebrated their seventh, and twice in a row victory over same BFC Dynamo. Then in 1990, he scored again for his Dynamo Dresden at the FDGB-Pokal final on 2 June 1990, the victory brought the club their third "double".

He made his debut to the European field at the match against Malmö FF for the 1984–85 European Cup Winners' Cup. Two weeks later, on 3 October 1984, he scored his first goal for European matches which is 3–0 goal (58.) for Dynamo Dresden 4–1 Malmö FF. He played 29 matches in total where he met clubs like KFC Uerdingen 05, VfB Stuttgart and Crvena zvezda.

Jörg Stübner played in 47 games for East Germany, being the 22nd of the most capped players in the East German football history. He made his debut during a World-Cup qualification match against Luxembourg on 17 November 1984 in Stade de la Frontière. On 11 September 1985, East Germany met France in floodlighted Zentralstadion for their sixth qualifying match of the 1986 FIFA World Cup, where Stübner, number 6, killed Michel Platini for 90 minutes. East Germany jubilated the 2–1 victory over The UEFA Euro 1984 champion, with "78000" spectators. His final game came on 12 September 1990 in a 2–0 win over Belgium in Brussels – the last game ever played by East Germany. As well as 30 friendly matches, Stübner also played in 12 FIFA World Cup and 5 UEFA European Championship qualifying matches. His only goal was scored on 13 April 1988 in a 1–1 friendly draw against Bulgaria in Deveti Septemvri.

After the political change, Dynamo Dresden faced financial difficulties under the guidance of experts from ex-West Germany, players had to lose the support from the club and Stübner was not an exception.

Stübner played five Bundesliga matches with Dynamo Dresden. For Dynamo Dresden, being a defensive midfielder, he played 249 matches in total and scored 24 goals. From 1993, he played for FC Sachsen Leipzig under former Dynamo Dresden and East Germany trainer Ede Geyer, then 1. FC Neubrandenburg 04, VfL Pirna-Copitz and VfB Sangerhausen, never made an appearance for the Germany national team. He gradually having financial and health problems, then had to fight against also tabloids.

During Ulf Kirsten's testimonial match in November 2003 at Dresden's Rudolf-Harbig-Stadion, Stübner scored his last goal in the stadium he spent so much of his career.

Lots of friends and football fans mourned his death. Stübner was recovering and frequently seen in Rudolf-Harbig-Stadion for Dynamo Dresden's home matches. Ulf Kirsten posted to his Twitter saying "The fate of "Stübs" has accompanied many fans for years and left no one untouched. A sad day for all of us!"
