= Dirk Zander =

German footballer and coach (born 1965)

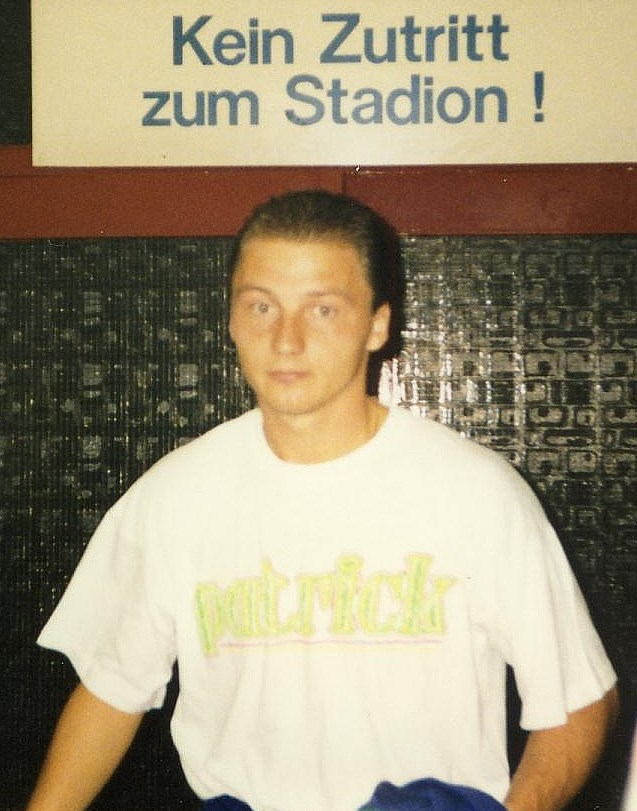
- Zander in the 1992–93 season

Personal information
- Date of birth: 13 May 1965 (age 61)
- Place of birth: Hamburg, West Germany
- Height: 1.78 m (5 ft 10 in)
- Position: Midfielder

Senior career*
Years	Team	Apps	(Gls)
1986–1991	FC St. Pauli	144	(46)
1991–1993	Dynamo Dresden	40	(10)
1993–1994	FC St. Pauli	26	(5)
Total		210	(61)
- * Club domestic league appearances and goals

Dirk Zander (born 13 May 1965) is a German retired professional footballer who played as a midfielder.
