= Detlef Schößler =

East German footballer and coach

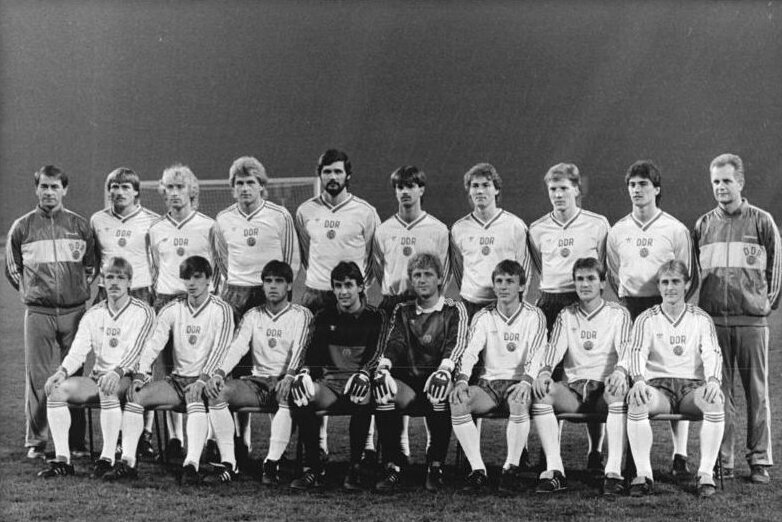
- Detlef Schößler (front row, first from left) as part of the East German football team in 1986

Personal information
- Date of birth: 3 October 1962 (age 64)
- Place of birth: East Germany
- Position: Defender

Youth career
- 1971–1979: 1. FC Magdeburg

Senior career*
Years	Team	Apps	(Gls)
1979–1989	1. FC Magdeburg	168	(8)
1989–1995	Dynamo Dresden	150	(4)
1995–1998	VfB Leipzig	68	(0)
1998–2001	SV Grimma	59	(1)
Total		445	(13)

International career
1986–1990	East Germany	18	(0)

Managerial career
- 2003: VfB Leipzig
- 2003–2004: SV Grimma
- 2006–2007: Hallescher FC
- * Club domestic league appearances and goals

Detlef Schößler (born 3 October 1962) is a former East German international footballer who became a coach.

The defender appeared in 319 top-flight matches in East and the reunified Germany.

Schößler won 18 caps for East Germany between 1986 and 1990.
