= Uwe Jähnig =

German footballer

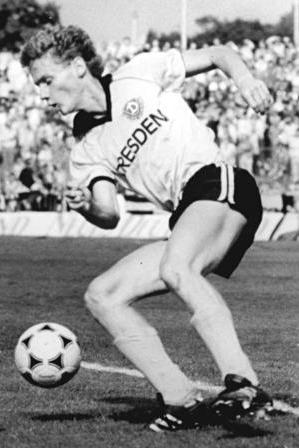
- Jähnig playing for Dynamo Dresden against Stahl Brandenburg in 1988

Personal information
- Date of birth: 26 August 1969 (age 57)
- Place of birth: Dresden, East Germany
- Height: 1.81 m (5 ft 11 in)
- Position: Midfielder

Senior career*
| Years | Team | Apps | (Gls) |
| 1987–1995 | Dynamo Dresden | 129 | (16) |
| 1991 | → 1. FC Magdeburg (loan) | 13 | (1) |
| 1995–1997 | Hamburger SV | 15 | (3) |
| Total | | 157 | (20) |

International career
| 1992 | Germany U-21 | 1 | (0) |
- * Club domestic league appearances and goals

Uwe Jähnig (born 26 August 1969) is a German former professional footballer who played as a midfielder. He played for Dynamo Dresden in the DDR-Oberliga and the Bundesliga, before joining Hamburger SV in 1995, along with team-mate Sven Kmetsch. He was forced to retire in 1997, due to injury.
