= Mario Kern =

German footballer

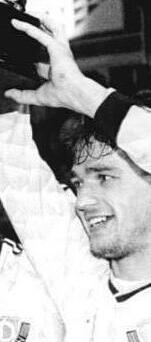
- Kern celebrating the Deutschland Cup in 1990

Personal information
- Date of birth: 16 August 1969 (age 57)
- Place of birth: Riesa, East Germany
- Height: 1.85 m (6 ft 1 in)
- Position: Defender

Youth career
- –1981: Stahl Riesa
- 1981–1988: Dynamo Dresden

Senior career*
Years	Team	Apps	(Gls)
1988–1995	Dynamo Dresden	84	(4)
1995–1996	1. FC Kaiserslautern	4	(0)
1996	Dynamo Dresden		
1996–1998	VfB Leipzig	23	(0)
1999–2002	VfL Pirna-Copitz		
2002–2004	BSV Sebnitz		

International career
	Germany U-21	5	(0)
- * Club domestic league appearances and goals

Mario Kern (born 16 August 1969) is a German former professional footballer who played as a defender for Dynamo Dresden, 1. FC Kaiserslautern and VfB Leipzig. He was a part of the East German squad at the 1989 FIFA World Youth Championship, playing all three matches.
