= Ronny Teuber =

German footballer

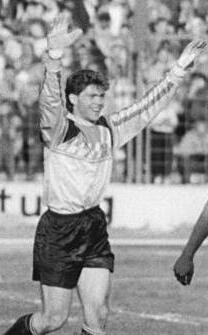
- Teuber in 1989

Personal information
- Date of birth: 1 September 1965 (age 61)
- Place of birth: East Berlin, East Germany
- Position: Goalkeeper

Team information
- Current team: Braunschweig (goalkeeping coach)

Youth career
- 1972–1973: SG Oberspree
- 1973–1984: 1. FC Union Berlin

Senior career*
Years	Team	Apps	(Gls)
1984–1986	1. FC Union Berlin	23	(0)
1985	→ Hansa Rostock (loan)	9	(0)
1986–1993	Dynamo Dresden	110	(0)
1993–1995	Borussia Dortmund	0	(0)
1995–1997	FC Gütersloh	40	(0)
1997–2002	SpVgg Greuther Fürth	11	(0)
2000	→ 1. FC Köln (loan)	0	(0)
Total		193	(0)

International career
	East Germany U-21	21	(0)
1990	East Germany	1	(0)

Managerial career
- 2002–2003: Greuther Fürth II (goalk. coach)
- 2003–2007: Hamburg (goalk. coach)
- 2007–2008: Dortmund (assistant)
- 2010–2014: Hamburg (goalk. coach)
- 2016–2017: Wil
- 2018–2017: Braunschweig (goalk. coach)
- * Club domestic league appearances and goals

Ronny Teuber (born 1 September 1965) is a German former footballer and former member of the East Germany national football team as well as the East Germany national under-21 football team.

== Career ==
The East Berlin-born goalkeeper played over 100 matches in the East German top-flight. His one cap for East Germany came in 1990.

Teuber worked as a goalkeeping coach for Bundesliga side Hamburger SV and assisting coach for Borussia Dortmund. On 12 December 2016, he was announced as the new manager of Swiss second division club FC Wil.
