= DFV-Supercup =

1989 DFV-Supercup
East German Supercup
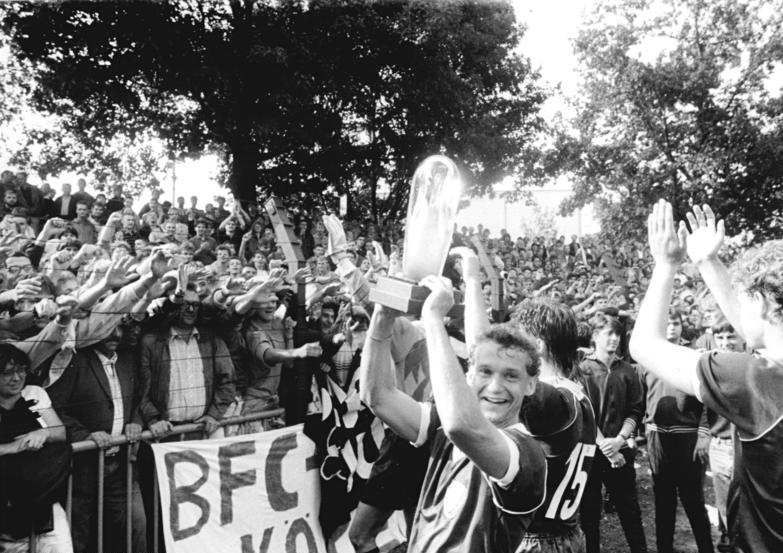
- BFC Dynamo celebrate winning the DFV-Supercup in 1989 with Heiko Bonan holding the trophy.
BFC Dynamo	Dynamo Dresden
4	1
- Date: 5 August 1989
- Venue: Stadion der Freundschaft, Cottbus
- Referee: Klaus-Dieter Stenzel (Forst)
- Attendance: 22,347

The DFV-Supercup (also known as Pokal des Deutschen Sportechos) was the super cup of East German football, played between the winners of the DDR-Oberliga and the FDGB-Pokal.

== History ==
It was originally planned to start in 1988, but was postponed as BFC Dynamo had won both competitions. An edition was played in 1989, with the Cup Winners BFC Dynamo beating Dynamo Dresden 4–1. The competition was not played in 1990 with German reunification underway, and an all-German Deutschland Cup was played instead. In 1991, the winners of the last East German titles, Hansa Rostock, along with cup finalists Stahl Eisenhüttenstadt, entered the DFB-Supercup.

== Teams ==
Team	Qualification
BFC Dynamo	1988–89 FDGB-Pokal winners
Dynamo Dresden	1988–89 DDR-Oberliga champions

== 1989 match ==
=== Details ===
5 August 1989

BFC Dynamo	4–1	Dynamo Dresden
Schulz 31'; Doll 62', 75'; Ernst 84'	Report	Sammer 87'

Stadion der Freundschaft, Cottbus
Attendance: 22,347
Referee: Klaus-Dieter Stenzel (Forst)

BFC Dynamo	Dynamo Dresden

GK	1	(East Germany) Bodo Rudwaleit
SW		(East Germany) Burkhard Reich
RB		(East Germany) Waldemar Ksienzyk
CB		(East Germany) Hendrik Herzog
CB		(East Germany) Bernd Schulz
LB		(East Germany) Marco Köller
CM		(East Germany) Jörg Fügner	(substituted off) 77'
CM		(East Germany) Rainer Ernst
CM		(East Germany) Heiko Bonan	(substituted off) 77'
CF		(East Germany) Thomas Doll
CF		(East Germany) Andreas Thom
Substitutes:
DF		(East Germany) Jörn Lenz	(substituted on) 77'
MF		(East Germany) Jörg Buder	(substituted on) 77'
Manager:
(East Germany) Helmut Jäschke

GK	1	(East Germany) Ronny Teuber
SW		(East Germany) Frank Lieberam
RB		(East Germany) Detlef Schößler
CB		(East Germany) Andreas Trautmann	(substituted off) 46'
CB		(East Germany) Uwe Kirchner
LB		(East Germany) Matthias Döschner
CM		(East Germany) Jörg Stübner
CM		(East Germany) Hans-Uwe Pilz
CM		(East Germany) Matthias Sammer
CF		(East Germany) Ulf Kirsten
CF		(East Germany) Torsten Gütschow	(substituted off) 56'
Substitutes:
MF		(East Germany) Ralf Hauptmann	(substituted on) 46'
MF		(East Germany) Uwe Jähnig	(substituted on) 56'
Manager:
(East Germany) Eduard Geyer

== Gallery ==
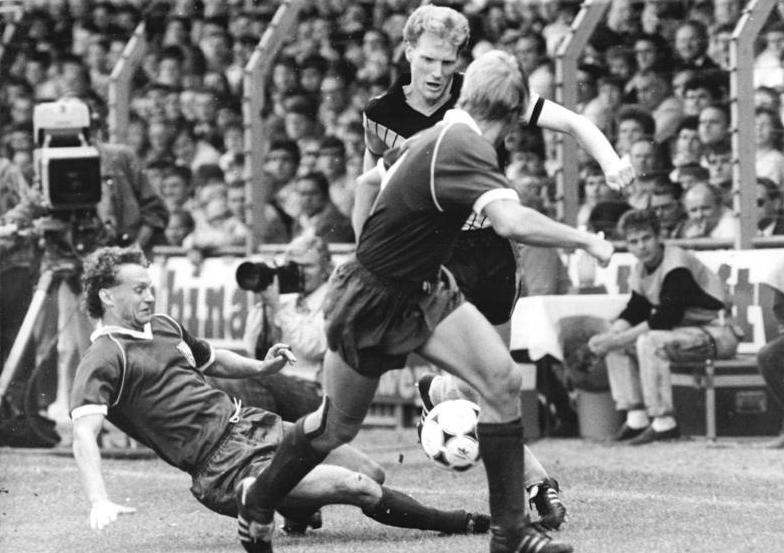
Matthias Sammer with the ball (center) fighting with Jörg Buder (left) and Marco Köller (in front) during the match.

== See also ==
- List of East German football champions
- 1989–90 DDR-Oberliga
- 1989–90 FDGB-Pokal
