= 1984–85 FDGB-Pokal =

1984-85 FDGB-Pokal
Tournament details
- Country: Germany
- Teams: 64

Final positions
- Champions: SG Dynamo Dresden
- Runners-up: Berliner FC Dynamo

Tournament statistics
- Matches played: 77
- Goals scored: 264 (3.43 per match)

The 1984–85 FDGB-Pokal was the 34th East German Cup. For the second consecutive year, Dynamo Dresden beat BFC Dynamo in the final, securing their sixth title.

== First round ==
Home team	Away team	Result
BSG Schiffahrt/Hafen Rostock	FC Carl Zeiss Jena II**	1:2
1. FC Union Berlin	BSG Chemie Leipzig	1:1 aet, 3:5 pens.
TSG Ruhla*	BSG Motor Suhl	2:1 aet
BSG Chemie Premnitz*	F.C. Hansa Rostock	0:2
BSG Motor Fritz Heckert Karl-Marx-Stadt*	FC Rot-Weiß Erfurt	0:2 aet
BSG Mansfeldkombinat Sangerhausen**	FC Karl-Marx-Stadt	0:2
BSG Motor Nordhausen II**	BFC Dynamo	1:6
BSG Robotron Sömmerda	1. FC Lokomotive Leipzig	0:6
TSG Elsterwerda**	BSG Stahl Brandenburg	0:1
TSG Gröditz*	1. FC Magdeburg	1:5
BSG Stahl Thale*	FC Vorwärts Frankfurt	0:1
BSG Aktivist Kali Werra Tiefenort	BSG Stahl Riesa	1:1 aet, 2:4 pens.
BSG Motor Weimar*	Dynamo Dresden	1:3
BSG Lokomotive/Armaturen Prenzlau*	FC Carl Zeiss Jena	1:3 aet
BSG Post Neubrandenburg	BSG Wismut Aue	0:1
ASG Vorwärts Hagenow**	1. FC Magdeburg II**	2:3
SG Dynamo Schwerin	BFC Dynamo II**	0:1
TSG Bau Rostock	ASG Vorwärts Dessau	0:1
BSG Einheit Wernigerode*	ASG Vorwärts Stralsund	2:3 aet
BSG Motor Babelsberg	BSG Chemie Böhlen	0:3
BSG Chemie Buna Schkopau	BSG Aufbau Krumhermersdorf	5:0
TSG Chemie Markkleeberg	BSG Rotation Berlin*	1:0
BSG Glückauf Sondershausen	BSG Chemie Wolfen	7:1
Dynamo Dresden II**	Hallescher FC Chemie	2:1
BSG Empor Tabak Dresden	BSG Chemie Velten**	2:4
BSG Aktivist Schwarze Pumpe	SG Dynamo Eisleben	2:0
BSG Sachsenring Zwickau	BSG Aktivist Brieske-Senftenberg	4:1
F.C. Hansa Rostock II**	FC Vorwärts Frankfurt II**	5:0
BSG Chemie PCK Schwedt*	FSV Lokomotive Dresden*	0:4
BSG Fortschritt Bischofswerda	Stahl Eisenhüttenstadt	6:2
BSG Fortschritt Weida*	Energie Cottbus	2:1
BSG Motor Nordhausen	SG Dynamo Fürstenwalde	2:0

- One asterisk: Club came through the qualifying round
  - Two asterisks: Club came through the qualifying round and won the Bezirkspokal

== 2nd round ==
Home team	Away team	Result
BSG Chemie Böhlen	BFC Dynamo	0:2
BSG Fortschritt Bischofswerda	BSG Stahl Riesa	0:6
TSG Chemie Markkleeberg	1. FC Lokomotive Leipzig	0:2
BSG Chemie Velten	FC Carl Zeiss Jena	1:0
BSG Sachsenring Zwickau	FC Karl-Marx-Stadt	3:1
TSG Ruhla	FC Vorwärts Frankfurt	0:1
ASG Vorwärts Stralsund	BSG Stahl Brandenburg	2:0
BSG Aktivist Schwarze Pumpe	1. FC Magdeburg	2:3 aet
FSV Lokomotive Dresden	BSG Chemie Leipzig	1:3
BSG Chemie Buna Schkopau	Dynamo Dresden	2:4 aet
BSG Glückauf Sondershausen	F.C. Hansa Rostock	1:6
ASG Vorwärts Dessau	BSG Wismut Aue	0:2
BSG Motor Nordhausen	FC Rot-Weiß Erfurt	0:2
Dynamo Dresden II	FC Carl Zeiss Jena II	5:1
BSG Fortschritt Weida	1. FC Magdeburg II	1:2
F.C. Hansa Rostock II	BFC Dynamo II	2:4

== Round of 16 ==
(3 November and 21–22 December 1984)

Home team (1st leg)	Away team (1st leg)	1st leg	2nd leg
BSG Wismut Aue	BFC Dynamo	3:1	0:2
BSG Sachsenring Zwickau	1. FC Magdeburg	1:1	0:1
F.C. Hansa Rostock	Dynamo Dresden	2:2	1:1
1. FC Lokomotive Leipzig	FC Vorwärts Frankfurt	3:1	0:3
BSG Stahl Riesa	BSG Chemie Leipzig	0:0	0:1
BSG Chemie Velten	ASG Vorwärts Stralsund	2:2	1:3
Dynamo Dresden II	BFC Dynamo II	1:2	2:2
1. FC Magdeburg II	FC Rot-Weiß Erfurt	1:3	0:2

== Quarter-finals ==
(20 and 27 February 1985)

Home team (1st leg)	Away team (1st leg)	1st leg	2nd leg
Dynamo Dresden	BFC Dynamo II	1:2	2:1 aet, 5:3 pens.
BFC Dynamo	ASG Vorwärts Stralsund	7:0	1:0
BSG Chemie Leipzig	1. FC Magdeburg	1:1	1:4
FC Rot-Weiß Erfurt	FC Vorwärts Frankfurt	3:1	0:3

== Semi-finals ==
(23 March and 1 May 1985)

Home team (1st leg)	Away team (1st leg)	1st leg	2nd leg
Dynamo Dresden	FC Vorwärts Frankfurt	0:2	2:0 aet, 4:2 pens.
BFC Dynamo	1. FC Magdeburg	3:4	2:0

== Final ==
8 June 1985

SG Dynamo Dresden	3 – 2	Berliner FC Dynamo
Döschner 43'; Stübner 59'; Minge 67'		Thom 51'; Ernst 88'

Stadion der Weltjugend, Berlin
Attendance: 48,000
Referee: Manfred Roßner (Gera)

SG DYNAMO DRESDEN:
GK	(East Germany) Bernd Jakubowski
SW	(East Germany) Hans-Jürgen Dörner
DF	(East Germany) Matthias Döschner
DF	(East Germany) Andreas Trautmann
DF	(East Germany) Steffen Büttner
MF	(East Germany) Jörg Stübner
MF	(East Germany) Hans-Uwe Pilz
MF	(East Germany) Reinhard Häfner
FW	(East Germany) Ralf Minge
FW	(East Germany) Ulf Kirsten	(substituted off) 85'
FW	(East Germany) Frank Lippmann	(substituted off) 34'
Substitutes:
MF	(East Germany) Frank Schuster	(substituted on) 85'
FW	(East Germany) Torsten Gütschow	(substituted on) 34'
Manager:
(East Germany) Klaus Sammer

BERLINER FC DYNAMO:
GK	(East Germany) Bodo Rudwaleit
SW	(East Germany) Frank Rohde
DF	(East Germany) Thomas Grether
DF	(East Germany) Norbert Trieloff	(substituted off) 70'
DF	(East Germany) Artur Ullrich
MF	(East Germany) Bernd Schulz
MF	(East Germany) Frank Terletzki
MF	(East Germany) Christian Backs	(substituted off) 81'
FW	(East Germany) Frank Pastor
FW	(East Germany) Rainer Ernst
FW	(East Germany) Andreas Thom
Substitutes:
DF	(East Germany) Mario Maek	(substituted on) 70'
MF	(East Germany) Jan Voß	(substituted on) 81'
Manager:
(East Germany) Jürgen Bogs

== Controversies during the final ==
The standard of refereeing in East German football had become a bone of contention in the upper levels of the SED and the East German regime, and the cup final was played at a time when the disillusionment about the successes of BFC Dynamo stood at its peak.

The German Football Association of the GDR (DFV) and the football weekly Die neue Fußballwoche received more than 700 complaints regarding the performance of the referees in the final. Harry Tisch was so upset about the performance of referee Manfred Roßner that he protested to Erich Mielke and complained that such performance undermined the credibility of the competition. With DFV functionaries, as well as Egon Krenz and other SED politicians, uneasy about the negative reactions, a special review of the final was conducted.

An eight-person panel led by DFV President Günter Erbach examined the video recording of the cup final on 21 June 1985. The panel concluded that 30 percent of the referee decisions were wrong, and that 80 percent of those had been of disadvantage to Dynamo Dresden. The referees had made 17 major mistakes during the final, of which 14 had been in favor of BFC Dynamo and 3 in favor of Dynamo Dresden. Of the 10 most egregious mistakes, 9 went against Dynamo Dresden. As an example, a regular goal from Ralf Minge was denied due to an alleged offside position. Referee Manfred Roßner was banned one year from officiating matches above second tier and assistant Klaus Scheurell was de-selected for the next round of the European cup. The cup final was the last match before retirement for assistant Widukind Herrmann.

Manfred Roßner conceded that he performed poorly during the final, but insisted that this was unintentional and unrepresentative of his "impressive record". Nothing emerged that indicated that Manfred Roßner had been bought by the Stasi. (Note: Author Alan McDougall suggests that it seems more likely that the referees ”followed the pattern of ’pre-emptive obedience’ that had long shaped the relationship between officials and the Dynamo organization”. This pattern was replicated in other countries in the Eastern bloc. A comparison can be made with the 1985 Bulgarian Cup Final. The 1985 Bulgarian Cup Final was marked by fan unrest, mass-brawl and assaults on the referees. Referee Ahmed Yasharov had made some controversial decisions. He afterwards said: "Nobody tried to put pressure on me before the match, but it was always difficult to referee matches between CSKA and Levski. We all knew who was behind these clubs and that we had to be faultless. Sometimes the psychological pressure leads to mistakes". Referees in East Germany was caught between a rock and a hard place: between the attempts by the DFV to mollify anti-BFC sentiment, which were supported by the SED, and the desire of the Stasi to advance the interest of the club it sponsored.) On the contrary, Manfred Roßner claims that he was approached by the DFV Deputy General Secretary Volker Nickchen before the match, who confidentially requested "no BFC-friendly decisions". He was also approached by the incensed DFV Vice President Franz Rydz after the match, who took him to office for his performance with the words: "You can't always go by the book, but have to officiate in a way that placates the Dresden public".

Manfred Roßner has continuously denied that he intentionally whistled against SG Dynamo Dresden in the cup final. In the book "Dynamo Dresden – a legend turns 50" (German: Dynamo Dresden – eine Legende wird 50) from Sächsische Zeitung, he said: "I can hardly look myself in the eyes when I analyze the game. But if I had intentionally whistled incorrectly, I would be half a criminal. That's not me."
