= Reinhard Häfner =

German footballer (1952–2016)

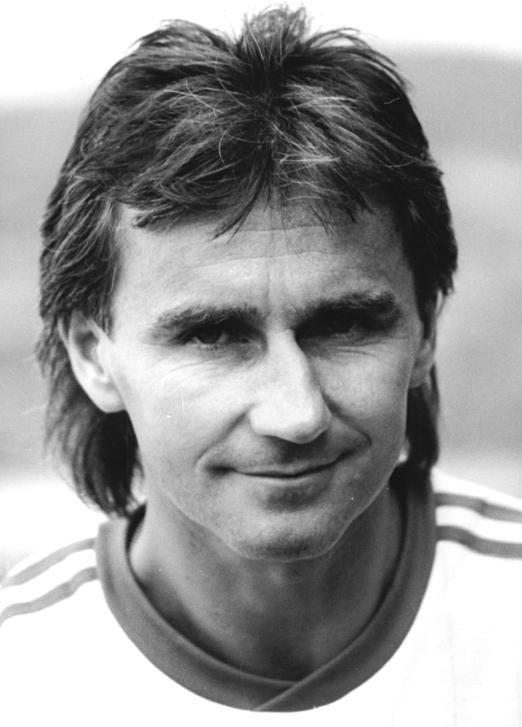
- Häfner with Dresden in 1990

Personal information
- Date of birth: 2 February 1952
- Place of birth: Sonneberg, East Germany
- Date of death: 24 October 2016 (aged 64)
- Place of death: Dresden, Germany
- Position: Midfielder

Youth career
- BSG Motor Sonneberg
- Rot-Weiß Erfurt

Senior career*
Years	Team	Apps	(Gls)
1970–1971	Rot-Weiß Erfurt	25	(6)
1971–1988	Dynamo Dresden	366	(49)
Total		391	(55)

International career
1971–1984	East Germany	58	(5)

Managerial career
- 1990–1991: Dynamo Dresden
- 1993–1996: Chemnitzer FC
- 1. SC Sonneberg
- SSV Erfurt-Nord
- 2000–2002: Hallescher FC
- 2009–2011: SV Grün-Weiß Langeneichstädt
- 2011–2016: 1. FC Radebeul
Medal record
Olympic Games
Bronze medal – third place	1972 Munich	Team competition
Gold medal – first place	1976 Montréal	Team competition
- * Club domestic league appearances and goals

Reinhard Häfner (2 February 1952 – 24 October 2016) was a German football player and coach.

== Career ==
Häfner played children's and youth football for his hometown club BSG Motor Sonneberg. As a junior player he was assigned to Rot-Weiß Erfurt before joining Dynamo Dresden in 1971. He stayed with the Dresden club until his retirement as a player in 1988 having played in 366 East German first division DDR-Oberliga matches, scoring 49 goals. He is second to Hans-Jürgen Dörner in matches played for Dynamo. Häfner was part of four DDR championship and FDGB Pokal (East German Cup) winning teams there.

Between 1971 and 1984 he was capped 58 times for the East Germany national team, scoring 5 goals, and was part of the gold medal-winning squad at the 1976 Summer Olympics in Montreal, Canada.

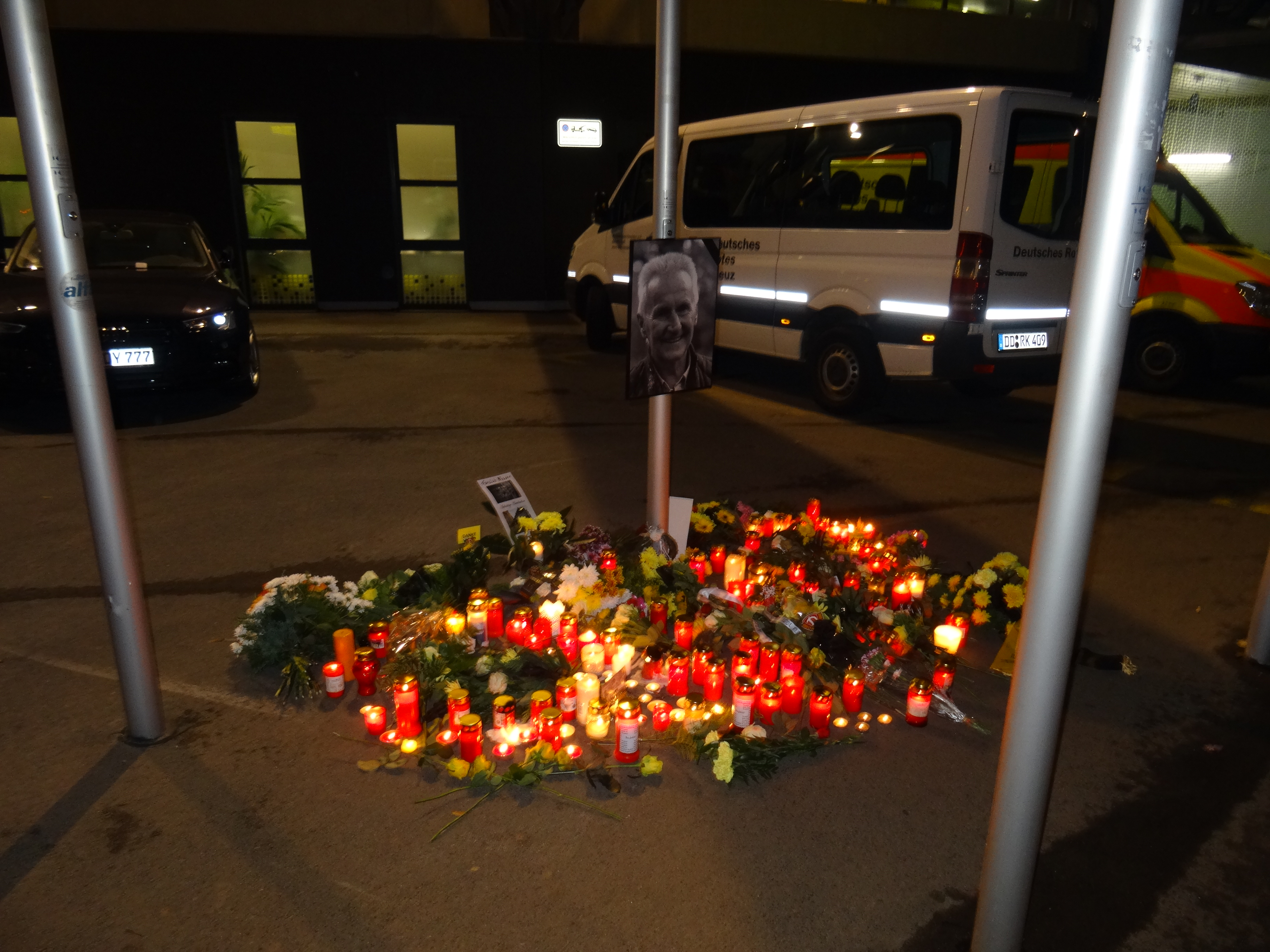
Sorrow about Häfner's death.

In April 1990, two years after his retirement as a player, Häfner became head coach of Dynamo Dresden, replacing Eduard Geyer. Weeks later Dynamo claimed its eighth championship and seventh cup. The following season, despite the sale of star players Ulf Kirsten and Matthias Sammer, Häfner guided the Dresden team to a second-place finish in the final DDR-Oberliga season before the merger of the football competitions of East and West Germany following the reunification of the country, qualifying the club for the first division Bundesliga. Despite this success he was dismissed in June 1991. He moved on to coach second division club Chemnitzer FC from 1993 to 1996.

Häfner joined SV Grün-Weiß Langeneichstädt (Kreisliga Merseburg/Querfurt, Sachsen-Anhalt) in the post-season of 2006–07.
