= Eduard Geyer =

German football player and manager

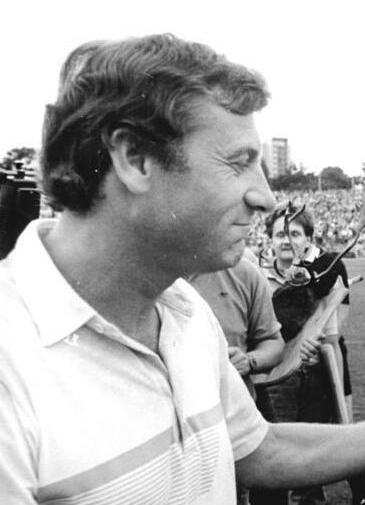
- Geyer as coach of Dynamo Dresden in 1989

Personal information
- Full name: Eduard Geyer
- Date of birth: 7 October 1944 (age 82)
- Place of birth: Bielsko, German-occupied Poland
- Height: 1.84 m (6 ft 0 in)
- Position: Defender

Youth career
- 1954–1957: BSG Aufbau Dresden-Mitte
- 1957–1962: SC Einheit Dresden

Senior career*
| Years | Team | Apps | (Gls) |
| 1962–1965 | SC Einheit Dresden | 54 | (7) |
| 1965–1968 | FSV Lokomotive Dresden | 74 | (12) |
| 1968–1975 | Dynamo Dresden | 112 | (12) |
| 1970–1975 | Dynamo Dresden II | 11 | (0) |
| Total | | 251 | (31) |

International career
| 1962–1963 | East Germany U18 (de) | 4 | (1) |

Managerial career
- 1975–1986: Dynamo Dresden (youth)
- 1975–1986: Dynamo Dresden (assistant)
- 1986–1990: Dynamo Dresden
- 1989–1990: East Germany
- 1990–1991: Schalke 04 (youth coordinator)
- 1991–1992: BFC Siófok
- 1992–1994: Sachsen Leipzig
- 1994–2004: Energie Cottbus
- 2005–2006: Al-Nasr
- 2006–2007: Sachsen Leipzig
- 2007–2008: Dynamo Dresden
- * Club domestic league appearances and goals

Eduard "Ede" Geyer (born 7 October 1944) is a German former professional football player and manager. He was the last manager of the East Germany national team. He also notably managed Energie Cottbus for 11 seasons, leading the club from the third division to the Bundesliga.

== Playing career ==
Geyer was born in Bielsko (Bielitz), during the German occupation of Poland. His family fled to Dresden after the end of World War II, and he began his football career with SC Einheit Dresden. In his youth was a goalkeeper, but he began his career playing as an attacker, later moving into defence. He joined Dynamo Dresden in 1968, where he played until his career ended in 1975 for health reasons. In total, he had played 112 games for the club, scoring twelve times, and was twice East German champion and won one Cup.

== Managerial career ==
Geyer moved into coaching, working with Dynamo's youth team and assisting first-team managers Walter Fritzsch, Gerhard Prautzsch and Klaus Sammer, whom he succeeded in 1986. He won the DDR-Oberliga in 1989, ending BFC Dynamo's ten-year dominance. He also reached the UEFA Cup semi-finals that year, before going on to manage the East Germany national team. His time in charge was to be short-lived, however, as the side disappeared with the reunification of East and West Germany.

After a brief spell scouting at Schalke 04, he moved to Hungary, managing BFC Siófok for a year before returning to Sachsen Leipzig. Under Geyer, the team captured the NOFV-Oberliga Süd (IV) title in 1993, but the club was denied promotion due when denied a licence to play in the Regionalliga (III) for financial reasons.

He moved on a year later, joining Energie Cottbus where he enjoyed great success, advancing the previously unheralded club through two promotions into the first-division Bundesliga. Under his direction, the team was able to stay up for three years despite having a very small budget. He also took his side to the DFB-Pokal (German Cup) final in 1997. After relegation to the 2. Bundesliga in 2003, the team was unable to bounce back, finishing 14th in 2004–05, which spelled the end of Geyer's tenure at Cottbus.

Geyer spent six months in the United Arab Emirates with Al-Nasr, before returning to Sachsen Leipzig, initially as sporting director, but later as manager. He left Sachsen at the end of the 2006–07 season due to financial problems and returned to Dynamo Dresden three months later, hoping to spearhead their qualification for the 3. Liga or higher. They did qualify for the third division, but results were generally poor, and Geyer was sacked in June 2008.

== Personality ==
In 1971, he was approached by the Ministry for State Security (Stasi) to serve as an Inoffizieller Mitarbeiter (unofficial collaborator), and to file reports on his fellow players for the state. Threatened with the end of his football career, Geyer agreed to the state’s requests under the codename "Jahn". This was revealed in 1992, following German reunification.

Geyer is well known in Germany for his outspoken manners. While coaches usually wrap critical statements in media friendly euphemisms, he's known to speak his mind in a very forthright manner. Examples include:

"Manche junge Spieler haben eine Einstellung zum Leistungssport wie die Nutten auf St. Pauli. Die rauchen, saufen und huren rum, gehen morgens um 6 Uhr ins Bett."

(Some young players tackle the sport like the whores at St. Pauli. They smoke, they drink, fuck around and go to bed at 6 in the morning.)

"Die Fans wollen keine Spiele, bei denen man erkennt, dass manche Spieler nachher kein Deo brauchen."

(The fans don't want to see games where you can tell that the players don't need an antiperspirant afterward.)

"Wer so doof ist, gehört nicht in die Bundesliga."

(Someone, who's so stupid doesn't belong in the Bundesliga.)

== Honours ==
=== Club ===
SC Einheit Dresden

- DDR Under-16 Cup: 1961

Dynamo Dresden

- DDR-Oberliga: 1970–71, 1972–73
- FDGB-Pokal: 1970–71

=== Club ===
Dynamo Dresden

- East German Junior Championship: 1982, 1985
- East German Junior Cup: 1976, 1985
- DDR-Oberliga: 1988–89

Sachsen Leipzig

- NOFV-Oberliga Süd: 1992–93

Energie Cottbus

- Regionalliga Nordost: 1996–97
- DFB-Pokal runner-up: 1996–97
- 2. Bundesliga third place: 1999–2000
