= Cor Pot =

Dutch football player and coach (born 1951)

Personal information
- Full name: Cornelius Gert Aaldrik Pot
- Date of birth: 8 June 1951 (age 75)
- Place of birth: The Hague, Netherlands
- Position: Midfielder

Team information
- Current team: Curaçao (assistant coach)

Senior career*
Years	Team	Apps	(Gls)
1970–1973	Sparta Rotterdam	5	(0)
1973–1974	MVV	33	(7)
1974–1976	Haarlem	32	(11)
1976–1980	Excelsior	128	(34)
1980–1981	Vlaardingen '74	15	(0)
Total		213	(52)

Managerial career
- 1988–1989: VV Wilhelmus
- 1989–1990: RBC Roosendaal
- 1990–1991: NAC Breda
- 1992–1994: Excelsior
- 1994–1995: Al-Masry
- 1995–1997: Telstar
- 2000–2001: Dynamo Dresden
- 2001–2006: Netherlands U17
- 2009–2013: Netherlands U21
- 2013–2016: XerxesDZB
- * Club domestic league appearances and goals

Cornelis "Cor" Pot (born 8 June 1951) is a Dutch football manager and former player who is assistant coach of the Curaçao national team.

== Playing career ==
Pot started his career as a midfielder with the academy of Sparta in Rotterdam. Throughout his career, he played 239 official matches and scored 58 goals, of which 105 and 18 (respectively) in the Dutch Eredivisie.

== Coaching career ==
Pot was sacked as manager of the Netherlands national under-21 team after its elimination from the 2013 UEFA European Under-21 Championship in the semifinals and subsequent criticism by the coach of the senior team, Louis van Gaal.

== Personal life ==
Pot is regarded as a womanizer.
