= Rolf Kukowitsch =

German football manager

Personal information
- Place of birth: Germany

Managerial career
- Years: Team
- 1949–1951: Chemie Leipzig
- 1950–1951: VP Dresden
- 1952: Wismut Aue
- 1955: Motor Karl-Marx-Stadt
- 1956: Dynamo Dresden

Rolf Kukowitsch was a German football coach who managed several clubs in East Germany.
