= Gelb-Weiss Görlitz =

NFV Gelb-Weiß Görlitz
- Full name: Niederschlesische Fußballverein Gelb-Weiß Görlitz (Lower Silesian Football Club Yellow-White Görlitz)
- Short name: GW Görlitz
- Founded: 1909
- Ground: Young World Stadium (German: Stadion Junge Welt)
- Capacity: 5500
- League: District Premier League Upper Lusatia
- 2023–24: 9th Place
- Website: www.nfv09.de
Traditional colours	Alternate colours

Niederschlesische Fußballverein Gelb-Weiß Görlitz (English: Lower Silesian Football Club Yellow-White Görlitz) is a German football club from Görlitz, in the Lower Silesian Upper Lusatia. The home ground of the club, which has 250 members, is the Young World Stadium (German: Stadion Junge Welt).

== History ==
Gelb-Weiß Görlitz was founded in 1909 as Sportclub Wanderslust. By 1910, the club was renamed Fußballclub Union. With the establishment of an athletics department in 1913, the club competed under the name Sportclub Union.

SpVgg Gelb-Weiß Görlitz was established in 1923 when the football department of ATV 1847 Görlitz separated from the gymnastics club and formed an independent club as part of the "clean separations" ordered by the umbrella associations. Major games were played at Schenkendorffplatz in the part of the city which is now part of Poland (current venue of the club Nysa Zgorzelec). In 1914, the club moved to its own field on the corner of Reichenbacher Straße/Kaiserring (today Rosa-Luxemburg-Straße), which was demolished during World War I. In 1928, 1931, and 1932, the club, now based in the Groß Biesnitz neighbourhood, became Upper Lusatian champions and thus qualified for the participation in the south-east German finals. In 1933, Gelb-Weiß Görlitz failed to qualify for the newly introduced Silesian Gauliga and subsequently played in the second-tier Lower Silesian Bezirksliga. By finishing 1st in group 2 of the 1940–41 Bezirksliga Niederschlesien, Görlitz qualified for the district championship final, which they lost to WSV Liegnitz, but were however promoted to the newly created Lower Silesian Gauliga. However, Görlitz withdrew completely from competitive play in the first Gauliga season, the 1941–42 Gauliga Niederschlesien.

In 1945, the club was revived as SG Görlitz-West west of the Lusatian Neisse river. Subsequently, the club was renamed SG Vorwärts Görlitz from 1948 and BSG Motor Görlitz from 1951. The conditions for football improved with the involvement of the local enterprise called "Waggonbau Görlitz". In 1958, Görlitz achieved promotion to the II. DDR-Liga. In the first season, promotion was narrowly missed, finishing behind Chemnitzer FC. After a total of four seasons in the third tier of the East German pyramid, BSG Motor WAMA Görlitz, as the club was known from 1965, mostly played at the regional level in the Dresden district leagues. In 1965 and 1977, the club was promoted to the DDR-Liga. However, Görlitz found this level too challenging and was relegated back to the Bezirksliga Dresden along with Fortschritt Weißenfels and Dynamo Lübben in both years.

After the reunification, NSV Gelb-Weiß Görlitz was re-founded on 2 July 1991. They played in the Bezirksliga Dresden from 1991 to 2000 for ten years. On 1 January 1, 1999, the football department separated from the parent NSV and has since played as NFV Gelb-Weiß Görlitz. In 2000 they won promotion to the Landesliga Sachsen.

In September 2016, NFV Gelb-Weiß Görlitz withdrew its first team from Landesliga operations with immediate effect and thus became the first relegated club of the 2016–17 season. The reasons for this were investigations against the board and the arrest of two foreign players who were officially eligible to play.

== Honours and achievements ==
- 3x Participation in the DDR-Liga: 1965–66, 1977–78
- 4x Participation in the II. DDR-Liga: 1959, 1960, 1961–62, 1962–63
- All-time table of the DDR-Liga: Rank no.154
- 3x Upper Lusatian champions: 1927–28, 1930–31, 1931–32
- 1× Upper Lusatian runners-up: 1932–33

== Notable players ==
Internationally capped:

- (East Germany) Johannes Schöne (1941, youth)
- (East Germany) Hans-Jürgen Dörner (1965–1967, youth)
- (Germany) Jens Jeremies (1980–1986, youth)

== Bibliography ==
- Hardy Grüne: Motor Görlitz. In: Encyclopedia of German League Football. Volume 7: Club Encyclopedia. AGON-Sportverlag, Kassel 2001, ISBN 3-89784-147-9.
- Rainer Menzel (2009). Tooore für Görlitz: Gelb-Weiß Görlitz 100 Jahre Fußball (1. ed.). Görlitz: Verlag Gunter Oettel. ISBN 978-3-93858-338-8.
