= Andreas Trautmann =

East German footballer

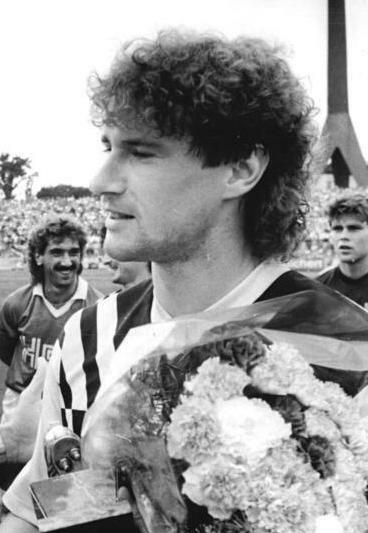
- Trautmann in 1989

Personal information
- Full name: Andreas Trautmann
- Date of birth: 21 May 1959 (age 67)
- Place of birth: Dresden, East Germany
- Height: 1.84 m (6 ft 0 in)
- Position: Midfielder

Youth career
- BSG Empor Tabak Dresden
- FSV Lokomotive Dresden
- 1972–1977: Dynamo Dresden

Senior career*
Years	Team	Apps	(Gls)
1977–1990	Dynamo Dresden	267	(48)
1990–1991	Fortuna Köln	10	(0)
1991–1992	Dynamo Dresden	3	(0)
1992–1994	Dresdner SC	59	(2)
Total		339	(50)

International career
1983–1989	East Germany	14	(1)

Managerial career
- 2001–2011: VfL Pirna-Copitz
- * Club domestic league appearances and goals

Olympic medal record

Representing East Germany

Men's Football
Silver medal – second place	1980 Moscow	Team competition

Andreas Trautmann (born 21 May 1959) is a German former professional footballer who played as a midfielder. Trautmann spent much of his career with Dynamo Dresden, for whom he played 270 games in the DDR-Oberliga (the third most for the club, behind Hans-Jürgen Dörner and Reinhard Häfner, respectively). During this time he earned 14 caps for East Germany, and won the silver medal at the 1980 Olympics. After reunification, Trautmann moved west, joining Fortuna Köln alongside teammates Matthias Döschner and Hans-Uwe Pilz, but it did not work out, and he was back at Dynamo Dresden within six months. He played out his career across town with Dresdner SC, before retiring in 1994.

== Honours ==
- DDR-Oberliga: 1978, 1989, 1990
- FDGB Pokal: 1982, 1984, 1985, 1990
