= Matthias Döschner =

German footballer

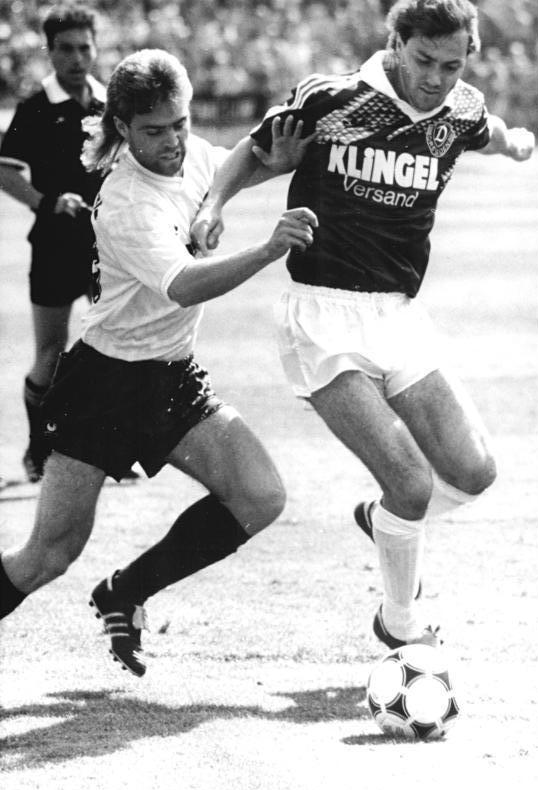
- Döschner (right), being challenged by Stefan Marx of Lokomotive Leipzig in a match of 1990

Personal information
- Full name: Matthias Döschner
- Date of birth: 12 January 1958 (age 68)
- Place of birth: Dohna, East Germany
- Height: 1.80 m (5 ft 11 in)
- Position: Winger

Youth career
- 1965–1971: FSV Lokomotive Dresden
- 1971–1977: Dynamo Dresden

Senior career*
Years	Team	Apps	(Gls)
1975–1989	Dynamo Dresden II	9	(1)
1977–1990	Dynamo Dresden	253	(33)
1990–1992	Fortuna Köln	24	(0)
1993–1995	Dresden Nord		
1999–2000	SV Obermarsberg		
Total		286	(34)

International career
1978–1988	East Germany U21	14	(2)
1982–1984	East Germany Olympic	8	(2)
1982–1989	East Germany	40	(2)

Managerial career
- 1995–1998: VfL Pirna-Copitz
- 1999–2000: SV Obermarsberg
- 2011: TSV Eintracht Waldeck
- 2012–2014: FSG Ittertal/Marienhagen
- 2015: FC International Korbach
- 2016–2018: SG Hoppecketal-Padberg
- 2018–2019: SG Eintracht Waldeck/Netze
- * Club domestic league appearances and goals

Matthias "Atze" Döschner (born 12 January 1958) is a former German football player and manager.

He spent much of his career with Dynamo Dresden, playing 253 matches in the DDR-Oberliga. After the Wende Döschner was under contract at SC Fortuna Köln.

He also won 40 caps for East Germany.

== Honours ==
Dynamo Dresden

- DDR-Oberliga: 1977–78, 1988–89, 1989–90
- FDGB-Pokal: 1981–82, 1983–84, 1984–85, 1989–90
