= Gerhard Prautzsch =

German footballer and coach

Personal information
- Date of birth: 25 September 1941 (age 85)
- Place of birth: Rochlitz, Germany
- Position: Defender

Youth career
- Motor Rochlitz
- Dynamo Dresden

Senior career*
Years	Team	Apps	(Gls)
1959–1962	Dynamo Dresden II		
1962–1969	Dynamo Dresden		

Managerial career
- 1978–1983: Dynamo Dresden
- 1983–1985: Dynamo Eisleben
- Estrela Vermelha
- Eintracht Schwerin
- * Club domestic league appearances and goals

Gerhard Prautzsch (born 25 September 1941) is a German former footballer and coach.
