= Hans-Uwe Pilz =

German former footballer (born 1958)

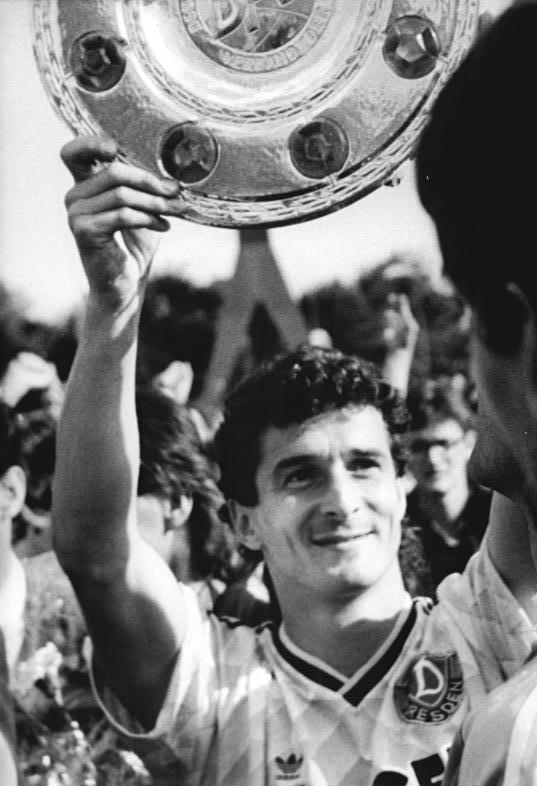
- Pilz lifting the East German Championship trophy in 1990

Personal information
- Date of birth: 10 November 1958 (age 67)
- Place of birth: Hohenstein-Ernstthal, East Germany
- Height: 1.71 m (5 ft 7 in)
- Position: Sweeper

Youth career
- 1968–1973: BSG Motor Hohenstein-Ernstthal
- 1973–1977: Sachsenring Zwickau

Senior career*
Years	Team	Apps	(Gls)
1977–1982	Sachsenring Zwickau	89	(17)
1982–1990	Dynamo Dresden	180	(30)
1990	Fortuna Köln	13	(1)
1990–1995	Dynamo Dresden	119	(5)
1995–1997	FSV Zwickau	34	(4)

International career
1982–1989	East Germany	35	(0)

Managerial career
- 1998: FSV Zwickau
- 1999: FSV Zwickau
- * Club domestic league appearances and goals

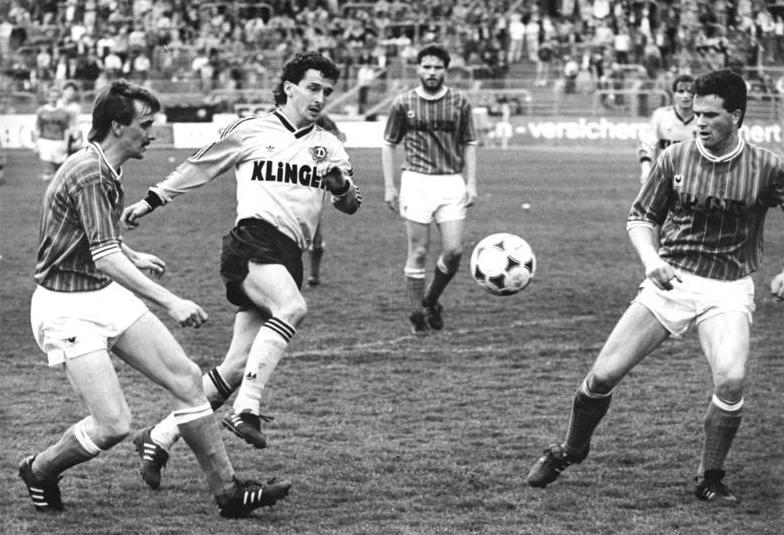
Pilz in action for Dresden against Frankfurt in 1990

Hans-Uwe Pilz (born 10 November 1958) is a German former footballer.

He began his career with BSG Sachsenring Zwickau before joining Dynamo Dresden during the winter break of the 1981–82 season. He remained at Dynamo until German reunification when he moved west, following teammates Matthias Döschner and Andreas Trautmann to Fortuna Köln. However, he returned to Dynamo after a few months, and would play for the club until 1995, including four years in the Bundesliga. After the club suffered a double relegation in 1995, Pilz returned to FSV Zwickau, before retiring in 1997. He later had two brief spells as manager at Zwickau. During his career he won 35 caps for East Germany.
