= Ulf Kirsten =

German footballer (born 1965)

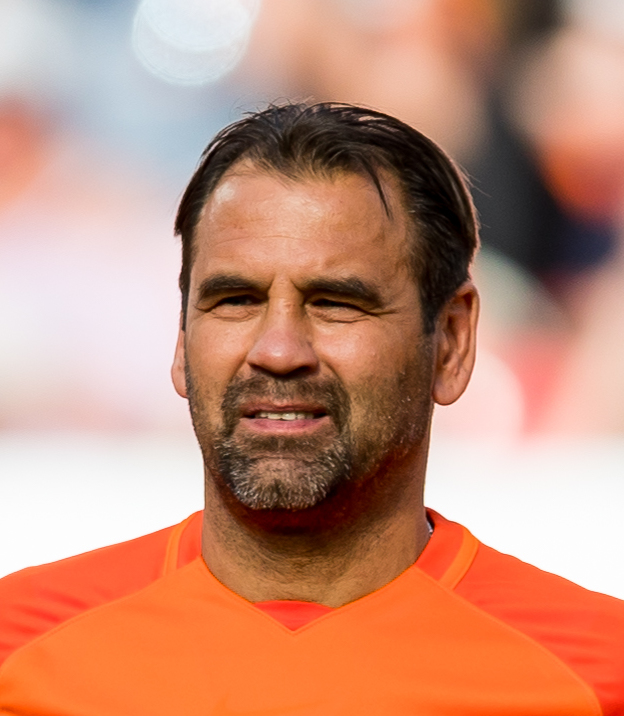
- Kirsten in 2019

Personal information
- Date of birth: 4 December 1965 (age 60)
- Place of birth: Riesa, East Germany
- Height: 1.72 m (5 ft 8 in)
- Position: Striker

Youth career
- 1972–1978: BSG Chemie Riesa (de)
- 1978–1979: BSG Stahl Riesa
- 1979–1983: Dynamo Dresden

Senior career*
Years	Team	Apps	(Gls)
1983–1990	Dynamo Dresden	154	(57)
1990–2003	Bayer Leverkusen	350	(181)
Total		504	(238)

International career
1981–1982	East Germany U16 (de)	7	(4)
1982–1984	East Germany U18 (de)	29	(9)
1984–1986	East Germany U21	10	(4)
1985–1990	East Germany	49	(14)
1990–2000	Germany	51	(20)

Managerial career
- 2003–2005: Bayer Leverkusen (assistant)
- 2005–2011: Bayer Leverkusen II
- 2024: Dynamo Dresden (assistant, interim)
- * Club domestic league appearances and goals

Ulf Kirsten (German pronunciation: [ʊlf ˈkɪʁstn̩]; born 4 December 1965) is a German former professional footballer who played as a striker. Nicknamed Der Schwatte (dialect for Der Schwarze, 'The Black One'), he is the first player in history to reach a total 100 caps playing with two different national teams (first for East Germany, then Reunified Germany). Kirsten's biggest success was the victory of the 1992–93 DFB-Pokal.

== Club career ==
=== Dynamo Dresden ===
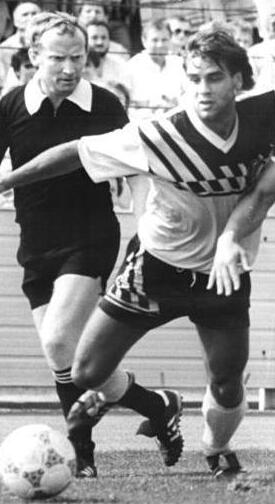
Kirsten with Dynamo Dresden in 1989

Kirsten began playing football for local team BSG Chemie Riesa in 1972. He joined BSG Stahl Riesa in 1978 before joining the youth academy of Dynamo Dresden in 1979. Dynamo Dresden was a center of excellence (German: Leistungszentrum) and the most prominent club in Bezirk Dresden. It was also the most successful club in East Germany at the time. Kirsten made his professional debut for Dynamo Dresden in the 1983–84 DDR-Oberliga season.

Kirsten played 154 matches and scored 57 goals for Dynamo Dresden in the DDR-Oberliga. He won the DDR-Oberliga with Dynamo Dresden in two consecutive seasons: 1988–88 and 1989–90. Kirsten became the Footballer of the Year in East Germany in 1990.

Kirsten had an unusual build: measuring only 172 cm (5 ft 8 in), but weighing 81 kg (179 lb). He therefore had an unusually low centre of gravity, which enabled him to protect the ball in the box against much bigger defenders and turn around quickly for close-range shots. His playing style was often compared to that of Gerd Müller. In addition, despite his small height, Kirsten was also a feared header.

=== Bayer Leverkusen ===
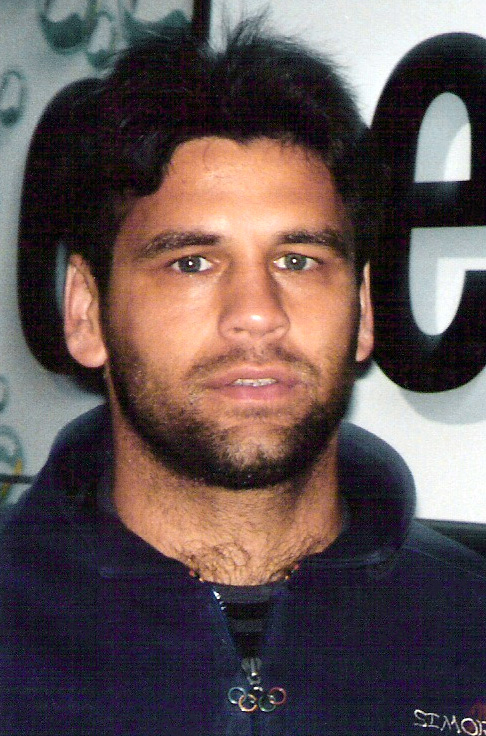
Kirsten in 1997

Kirsten was one of the first East German men's footballers to enter the Bundesliga after the German reunification. In the German Bundesliga he played 350 matches for Bayer 04 Leverkusen and scored 182 goals (ranked #7 in the Bundesliga all-time top scorer list). He established himself as one of the most dangerous strikers in the Bundesliga, but Bayer Leverkusen regularly ended as runner-up to either Bayern Munich or Borussia Dortmund. He stayed there until his retirement in 2003. He also played in the 2002 UEFA Champions League Final, although his team lost to Real Madrid. In the 1999–2000 season, Kirsten won the EFFIFU award for being the most efficient striker in the league.

Off the pitch, Kirsten was famous for his strong beard growth, which earned him a sponsorship by Braun, who used him to advertise their electrical shavers.

== International career ==
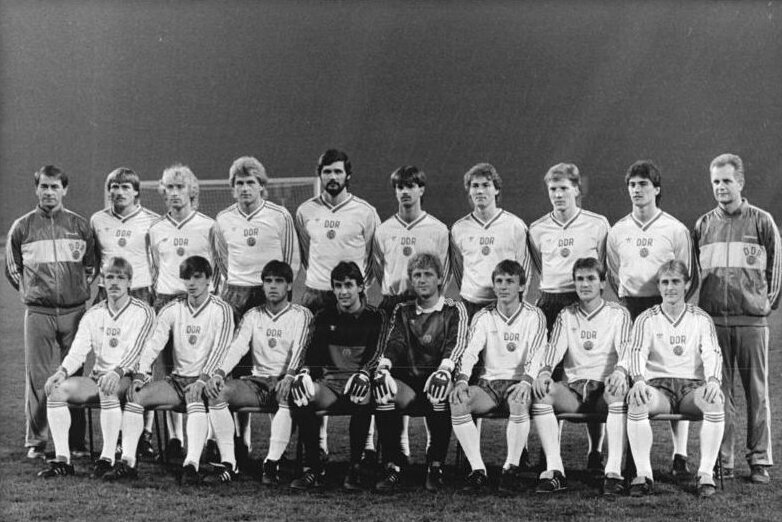
East Germany squad photo from 1986 – Kirsten is seated third from left in the front row

Kirsten's 100 caps are almost evenly split: 49 for East Germany and 51 for the re-unified Germany in a career which spanned 15 years from 1985 until 2000, with the reunified team being formed in late 1990.

Kirsten scored a total of 34 international goals, 14 of them for East Germany. His only major tournaments came late in his career; Kirsten played for his country at the 1994 and 1998 World Cups and Euro 2000.

== Personal life ==
Kirsten's son Benjamin is also a footballer and has played as a goalkeeper for Dynamo Dresden and NEC Nijmegen.

Along with several other teammates, Kirsten was allegedly implicated as an Stasi Inoffizieller Mitarbeiter (informant) under the codename "Knut Krüger" during his time at Dynamo Dresden through files recovered from the security service's archives after the fall of East Germany.

Nicknamed "Der Schwatte" by fans due to his southern European appearance and his swarthy hair, he and his son created a gin tonic brand with the same name in 2020. The term "schwatt" is a dialect expression in the Ruhr area and Rhineland for the colour black.

== Career statistics ==
=== Club ===
Including only appearances and goals for Bayer Leverkusen
Club	Season	League			DFB-Pokal		DFB-Ligapokal		Europe		Other		Total	
Club	Season	Division	Apps	Goals	Apps	Goals	Apps	Goals	Apps	Goals	Apps	Goals	Apps	Goals
Bayer Leverkusen	1990–91	Bundesliga	32	11	2	2	—		5 (Note: Appearances in UEFA Cup)	2	—		39	15
Bayer Leverkusen	1991–92	Bundesliga	23	12	1	1	—		—		—		24	13
Bayer Leverkusen	1992–93	Bundesliga	33	20	7	3	—		—		—		40	23
Bayer Leverkusen	1993–94	Bundesliga	28	12	3	1	—		4 (Note: Appearances in European Cup Winners' Cup)	5	1 (Note: Appearance in DFB-Supercup)	1	36	19
Bayer Leverkusen	1994–95	Bundesliga	27	15	1	0	—		9	10	—		37	25
Bayer Leverkusen	1995–96	Bundesliga	29	8	3	2	—		2 (Note: Appearances in UEFA Intertoto Cup)	1	—		34	11
Bayer Leverkusen	1996–97	Bundesliga	29	22	1	0	—		—		—		30	22
Bayer Leverkusen	1997–98	Bundesliga	27	22	3	2	1	1	9 (Note: Appearances in UEFA Champions League)	2	—		40	27
Bayer Leverkusen	1998–99	Bundesliga	31	19	2	2	2	1	3	2	—		38	24
Bayer Leverkusen	1999–2000	Bundesliga	27	17	0	0	2	2	6	4	—		35	23
Bayer Leverkusen	2000–01	Bundesliga	29	12	2	1	1	1	4	3	—		36	17
Bayer Leverkusen	2001–02	Bundesliga	32	11	5	3	1	0	14	4	—		52	18
Bayer Leverkusen	2002–03	Bundesliga	3	0	1	0	1	0	—		—		5	0
Career total			350	181	31	17	8	5	56	33	1	1	446	237

=== International ===
Appearances and goals by national team and year
National team	Year	Apps	Goals
East Germany	1985	7	1
East Germany	1986	10	2
East Germany	1987	9	4
East Germany	1988	10	0
East Germany	1989	11	4
East Germany	1990	5	3
East Germany	Total	52	14
Germany	1992	3	0
Germany	1993	6	2
Germany	1994	4	3
Germany	1995	4	1
Germany	1996	1	0
Germany	1997	7	5
Germany	1998	16	5
Germany	1999	5	1
Germany	2000	5	3
Germany	Total	51	20
Career total		103	34

- Ulf Kirsten's team's score listed first, score column indicates score after each Ulf Kirsten goal.

International goals by Ulf Kirsten
No.	Team	Cap	Date	Venue	Opponent	Score	Result	Competition	Ref
1	East Germany	3	14 August 1985	Ullevaal Stadion, Oslo, Norway	Norway	1–0	1–0	Friendly	
2	East Germany	10	19 February 1986	Estádio 1º de Maio, Braga, Portugal	Portugal	2–0	3–1	Friendly	
3	East Germany	16	29 October 1986	Sportforum Chemnitz, Chemnitz, East Germany	Iceland	2–0	2–0	UEFA Euro 1988 qualifying	
4	East Germany	23	23 September 1987	Stadion der Freundschaft, Gera, East Germany	Tunisia	2–0	2–0	Friendly	
5	East Germany	24	10 October 1987	Friedrich-Ludwig-Jahn-Sportpark, East Berlin, East Germany	Soviet Union	1–0	1–1	UEFA Euro 1988 qualifying	
6	East Germany	25	28 October 1987	Ernst Grube Stadium, Magdeburg, East Germany	Norway	1–0	3–1	UEFA Euro 1988 qualifying	
7	East Germany	25	28 October 1987	Ernst Grube Stadium, Magdeburg, East Germany	Norway	3–1	3–1	UEFA Euro 1988 qualifying	
8	East Germany	37	13 February 1989	Cairo International Stadium, Cairo, Egypt	Egypt	1–0	4–0	Friendly	
9	East Germany	37	13 February 1989	Cairo International Stadium, Cairo, Egypt	Egypt	3–0	4–0	Friendly	
10	East Germany	42	20 May 1989	Zentralstadion, Leipzig, East Germany	Austria	1–1	1–1	1990 FIFA World Cup qualification	
11	East Germany	43	23 August 1989	Steigerwaldstadion, Erfurt, East Germany	Bulgaria	1–0	1–1	Friendly	
12	East Germany	50	28 March 1990	Friedrich-Ludwig-Jahn-Sportpark, Berlin, Germany	United States	1–0	3–2	Friendly	
13	East Germany	50	28 March 1990	Friedrich-Ludwig-Jahn-Sportpark, Berlin, Germany	United States	2–0	3–2	Friendly	
14	East Germany	50	28 March 1990	Friedrich-Ludwig-Jahn-Sportpark, Berlin, Germany	United States	3–1	3–2	Friendly	
15	Germany	4	14 April 1993	Ruhrstadion, Bochum, Germany	Ghana	1–1	6–1	Friendly	
16	Germany	6	13 October 1993	Wildparkstadion, Karlsruhe, Germany	Uruguay	4–0	5–0	Friendly	
17	Germany	10	27 April 1994	Al Nahyan Stadium, Abu Dhabi, United Arab Emirates	United Arab Emirates	1–0	2–0	Friendly	
18	Germany	11	16 November 1994	Arena Kombëtare, Tirana, Albania	Albania	2–1	2–1	UEFA Euro 1996 qualifying	
19	Germany	12	14 December 1994	Republican Stadium, Chișinău, Moldova	Moldova	1–0	3–0	UEFA Euro 1996 qualifying	
20	Germany	17	6 September 1995	Frankenstadion, Nuremberg, Germany	Georgia	3–1	4–1	UEFA Euro 1996 qualifying	
21	Germany	20	2 April 1997	Nuevo Estadio de Los Cármenes, Granada, Spain	Albania	1–1	3–2	1998 FIFA World Cup qualification	
22	Germany	20	2 April 1997	Nuevo Estadio de Los Cármenes, Granada, Spain	Albania	2–1	3–2	1998 FIFA World Cup qualification	
23	Germany	20	2 April 1997	Nuevo Estadio de Los Cármenes, Granada, Spain	Albania	3–1	3–2	1998 FIFA World Cup qualification	
24	Germany	23	6 September 1997	Olympiastadion, Berlin, Germany	Portugal	1–1	1–1	1998 FIFA World Cup qualification	
25	Germany	24	10 September 1997	Westfalenstadion, Dortmund, Germany	Armenia	4–0	4–0	1998 FIFA World Cup qualification	
26	Germany	28	25 March 1998	Gottlieb-Daimler-Stadion, Stuttgart, Germany	Brazil	1–1	1–2	Friendly	
27	Germany	32	5 June 1998	Carl-Benz-Stadion, Mannheim, Germany	Luxembourg	1–0	7–0	Friendly	
28	Germany	32	5 June 1998	Carl-Benz-Stadion, Mannheim, Germany	Luxembourg	4–0	7–0	Friendly	
29	Germany	40	14 October 1998	Republican Stadium, Chișinău, Moldova	Moldova	1–1	3–1	UEFA Euro 2000 qualifying	
30	Germany	40	14 October 1998	Republican Stadium, Chișinău, Moldova	Moldova	2–1	3–1	UEFA Euro 2000 qualifying	
31	Germany	44	4 June 1999	BayArena, Leverkusen, Germany	Moldova	2–0	6–1	UEFA Euro 2000 qualifying	
32	Germany	48	26 April 2000	Fritz-Walter-Stadion, Kaiserslautern, Germany	Switzerland	1–1	1–1	Friendly	
33	Germany	49	7 June 2000	Dreisamstadion, Freiburg, Germany	Liechtenstein	5–2	8–2	Friendly	
34	Germany	49	7 June 2000	Dreisamstadion, Freiburg, Germany	Liechtenstein	7–2	8–2	Friendly	

== Managerial statistics ==
As of 25 May 2012

Team	From	To	Record							
Team	From	To	G	W	D	L	GF	GA	GD	Win %
Bayer Leverkusen II	1 July 2005	30 June 2011	209	72	50	87	292	313	−21	34.45
Total			209	72	50	87	292	313	−21	34.45

== Honours ==
=== Club ===
Dynamo Dresden

- DDR-Oberliga: 1988–89, 1989–90
- FDGB-Pokal: 1984–85, 1989–90

Bayer Leverkusen

- DFB-Pokal: 1992–93
- UEFA Champions League runner-up: 2001–02

=== Individual ===
- East German Footballer of the Year: 1990
- Bundesliga top scorer: 1992–93, 1996–97, 1997–98
- European Cup Winners' Cup top scorer: 1993–94
- UEFA Cup top scorer: 1994–95
- kicker Bundesliga Team of the Season: 1996–97, 1998–99

== See also ==
- List of men's footballers with 100 or more international caps
