= Dynamo Dresden =

German association football club

SG Dynamo Dresden
- Full name: Sportgemeinschaft Dynamo Dresden e. V.
- Nicknames: SGD, Dynamo
- Founded: 12 April 1953; 73 years ago
- Ground: Rudolf-Harbig-Stadion
- Capacity: 32,085
- President: Ronny Rehn
- Sporting director: Sören Gonther
- Head coach: Thomas Stamm
- League: 2. Bundesliga
- 2025–26: 2. Bundesliga, 11th of 18
- Website: dynamo-dresden.de
Home colours	Away colours	Third colours

Sportgemeinschaft Dynamo Dresden e.V., commonly known as SG Dynamo Dresden or Dynamo Dresden, is a German association football club based in Dresden, Saxony. They were founded on 12 April 1953 as a club affiliated with the East German police and became one of the most popular and successful clubs in East German football, winning eight league titles. The club is known for its dedicated fan culture of Dynamo Ultras, and elaborate choreographs.

After the reunification of Germany, Dynamo played four seasons in the top division, Bundesliga, from 1991 to 1995, but have since drifted between the second and fourth tiers. The club competes in the 2. Bundesliga, the second division of German Football following promotion in the 2024–25 season.

The club's traditional kit colours are gold and black, derived from the official city flag and the coat of arms of the city of Dresden.

== History ==
=== Early years (1950–1954) ===
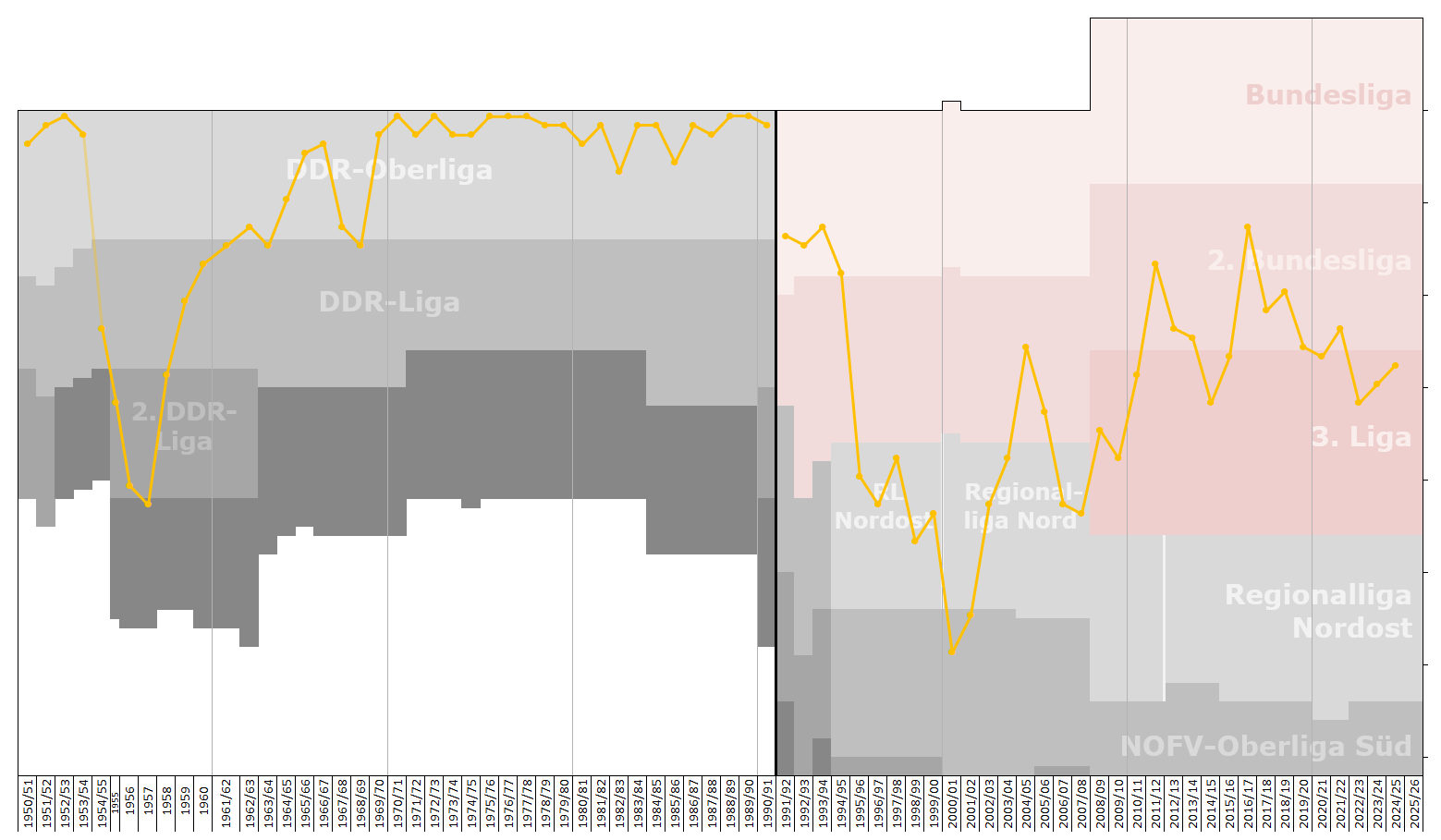
Historical chart of Dynamo Dresden league performance

The city of Dresden played a significant part in German football before and during World War II. Local football team Dresdner SC won the national championships in 1943 and 1944. The occupying Allied authorities dissolved organizations across Germany, including sports clubs like Dresdner SC, after the war as part of the process of denazification. Dresdner SC was reestablished in 1946 as SG Friedrichstadt. However, the eastern part of Germany, including Dresden, was under Soviet control, and the sports club was considered too bourgeois by authorities.

SG Friedrichstadt met ZSG Horst Zwickau at the Heinz-Steyer-Stadion in Dresden on 16 April 1950. The match would practically decide which of the two teams that would win the East German championship in the 1949–50 season. The match was attended by 60,000 spectators at the Heinz-Steyer-Stadion. The SED First Secretary Walter Ulbricht and his entourage were also present. ZSG Horch Zwickau had been founded only one year earlier and embodied the form of organization that the SED and the state leadership wanted to promote for the sports movement they propagated. ZSG Horch Zwickau won the match 1–5 and became East German champions. The match was characterized by a very physical play from ZSG Horch Zwickau and several controversial referee decisions in favor of ZSG Horch Zwickau. The players of SG Friedrichstadt left the pitch without greeting their opponents and thousands of angry Dresden spectators invaded the pitch. East German sports authorities took these events as a pretext to dissolve SG Friedrichstadt and delegate the players to BSG VVB Tabak Dresden.

The city needed a new, ideologically safe representative in the DDR-Oberliga. BSG VVB Tabak Dresden was planned to take over the place of SG Friedrichstadt in the DDR-Oberliga. However, most players from the former team of SG Friedrichstadt, including player-coach Helmut Schön, did not agree with the move to BSG VVB Tabak Dresden and left Dresden to join Hertha BSC or other clubs under the German Football Association (DFB). To save the place in the DDR-Oberliga for Dresden, the place was instead given to SV Deutsche Volkspolizei Dresden.

SV Deutsche Volkspolizei Dresden played in the lower-tier Stadtliga Dresden at the time of the dissolution of SG Fredrichsstadt. SV Deutsche Volkspolizei Dresden was thus able to enter DDR-Oberliga without having to progress through divisions. To keep its place in the DDR-Oberliga, the team of SV Deutsche Volkspolizei Dresden would be reinforced with players from all over the country.

SV Deutsche Volkzpolizei Dresden was originally founded as SG Volkspolizei Dresden in 1948. The head of the Volkspolizei Kurt Fischer ordered the founding of a central sports association for all sports communities of the Volkspolizei around East Germany on 20 June 1950. The new sports association was named SV Deutsche Volkspolizei. SG Volkspolizei Dresden was thus incorporated into the new sports association and renamed SV Deutsche Volkspolizei Dresden. The order from Fischer also contained the passage that the best football players in the sports communities of the Volkspolizei should be concentrated in the now first-tier SV Deutsche Volkspolizei Dresden.

The 40 best players of the various Volkspolizei teams in East Germany were then brought together for a training session in Forst in July 1950. Coaches Fritz Sack and Paul Döring picked out 17 players from 11 different cities who were delegated to Dresden to form the team. (Note: East German football weekly Die neue Fußballwoche wrote on 8 August 1950 that 22 candidates for a place in the squad of SV Deutsche Volkszpolizei Dresden had been on a training camp in Forst for around three weeks.) SV Deutsche Volkspolizei Potsdam lost its five top performers to Dresden, including Herbert Schoen, Johannes Matzen and Günter Schröter, and was severely weakened. SV Deutsche Volkspolizei Dresden quickly established itself as a force in East German football, finishing in fourth place in its first season of the DDR-Oberliga. The team then won its first title in the 1951–52 FDGB-Pokal.

The new sports association SV Dynamo was founded on 27 March 1953. SV Dynamo was formed from SV Deutsche Volkspolizei and the sports communities of the Ministry of State Security, commonly known as the Stasi. The president of SV Dynamo was Erich Mielke, at the time deputy head of the Stasi. SV Deutsche Volkspolizei was incorporated into SV Dynamo and reformed as Dynamo Dresden on 12 April 1953. The official founding date of Dynamo Dresden has since been 12 April 1953. Shortly after this, the club claimed its first league title.

However, success proved to be the club's undoing. The team Dynamo Dresden was relocated to Berlin in November 1954 to play for the new sports club SC Dynamo Berlin in the DDR-Oberliga. The remainder of Dynamo Dresden was left to regroup in the second-tier DDR-Liga, taking over the place in the DDR-Liga, as well as points and goals, from dissolved SC DHFK Leipzig. Political factors and pressure from Erich Mielke were probably the main reasons behind the relocation of Dynamo Dresden to Berlin. The relocation was meant to provide the capital with a competitive team that could rival Hertha BSC, Blau-Weiß 1890 Berlin and Tennis Borussia Berlin, which were still popular in East Berlin and drew football fans to West Berlin.

=== Re-emergence (1954–1969) ===
Dynamo Dresden was left with a team composed of youth and reserve players and had dropped to the fourth tier by 1957, playing in the local Bezirksliga. Dynamo Dresden began to climb the divisions, though, and by 1962 they were back in the DDR-Oberliga, and although this first season ended in relegation, they bounced back immediately. They recovered equally well from another relegation in 1968, and remained in the Oberliga from 1969 until its dissolution in 1991. This relegation came after a fourth-place finish in 1967, which enabled Dynamo's first foray into European football – they entered the 1967–68 Fairs Cup, where they were eliminated by Scottish side Rangers in the first round.

East German football was reorganized during the 1965–66 season. Ten football departments were separated from their sports clubs to create ten dedicated football clubs (German: Fußballclub) (FC). The best talents in the country were meant to be concentrated in the new dedicated football clubs, with the object to bring stability to the game at the top level and to develop players for the national team. It had long been planned to merge Dynamo Dresden with the football department of sports club SC Einheit Dresden, to concentrate the best footballer in the regional district in one club. This had been done in Leipzig. However, a tug of war developed between Erich Mielke and the SED First Secretary in Bezirk Dresden Werner Krolikowski. Erich Mielke did not want to give up Dynamo Dresden, while Krolikowski advocated for the establishment of a civil football club. The stalemate continued for one and a half years. The football department of SC Einheit Dresden was reorganized as FSV Lokomotive Dresden on 12 January 1966. Dynamo Dresden was then declared a regional district center of excellence (German: Leistungszentrum) in Bezirk Dresden by the regional district board (German: Bezirksvorstandes) of the DTSB on 5 August 1968. The club could now draw on the best players in the whole regional district.

Dynamo Dresden would enjoy the same funding and the same privileges as a designated football club, although it retained its designation as a "Sports Community" (German: Sportgemeinschaft) (SG). Without this support, the club's future success would have been hard to achieve.

=== Glory years (1969–1978) ===
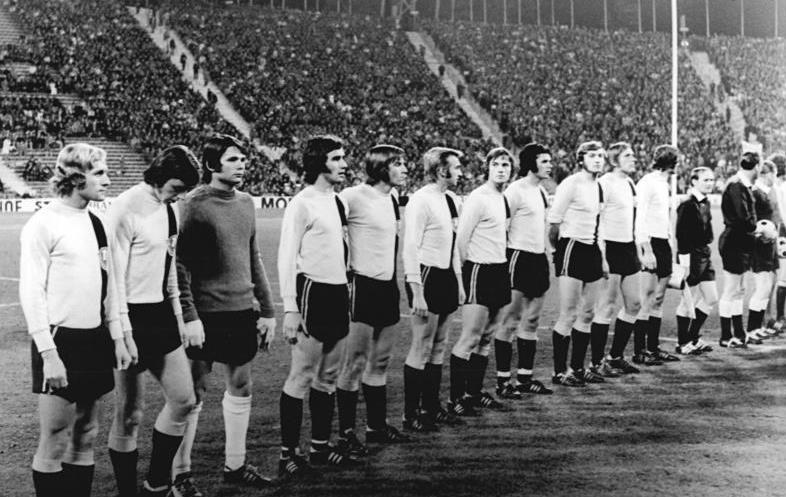
Dynamo face Bayern Munich in the 1973–74 European Cup

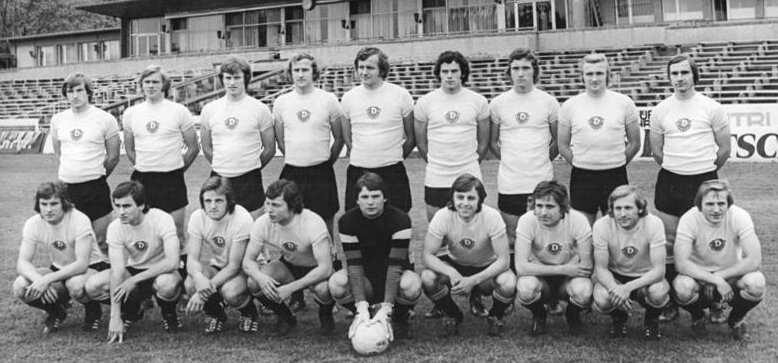
The championship-winning squad of 1975–76

During the 1970s, Dynamo established themselves as one of the top teams in East Germany, under the management of Walter Fritzsch. They won five league titles (1971, 1973, 1976, 1977 and 1978), and two cups, (1971 and 1977). They battled with 1. FC Magdeburg for domination of the league, and became the most popular team in the country, regularly drawing crowds of 25,000, around three times what other clubs were attracting.

Dynamo also began to establish themselves as a presence in European football – they played in European competition every year during the 1970s, and eliminated some big names – beating FC Porto, Juventus and Benfica on their way to four quarter-final finishes. During this time Dynamo came up against West German opposition for the first time, losing against Bayern Munich 7–6 on aggregate in the last 16 of the 1973–74 European Cup. Dynamo Dresden lost the first leg 4–3 away in Munich and managed a 3–3 draw home at the Dynamo-Stadion. The Stasi had tapped the salon at the Interhotel Newa in Dresden where the Bayern Munich team held their final meeting before the second leg. A message with information about the line-up of Bayern Munich was quickly sent by motorcycle to the coach of Dynamo Dresden Walter Fritzsch in preparation for the match. On three occasions they were eliminated by English side Liverpool, twice in the UEFA Cup and once in the European Cup, and each time Liverpool went on to win the competition. On three other occasions in the 1970s, Dynamo were eliminated by the team that eventually won the tournament — Leeds United in the 1970–71 Fairs Cup, Ajax in the 1971–72 European Cup, and Bayern Munich in the 1973–74 European Cup. In 1973, Hans-Jürgen Kreische was the first Dynamo Dresden player to be named East German Footballer of the Year, and was followed by Hans-Jürgen Dörner in 1977. Kreische was the league's leading goalscorer on four occasions, and was named in East Germany's squad for the 1974 World Cup, along with teammate Siegmar Wätzlich.

=== Capital dominance (1978–1991) ===
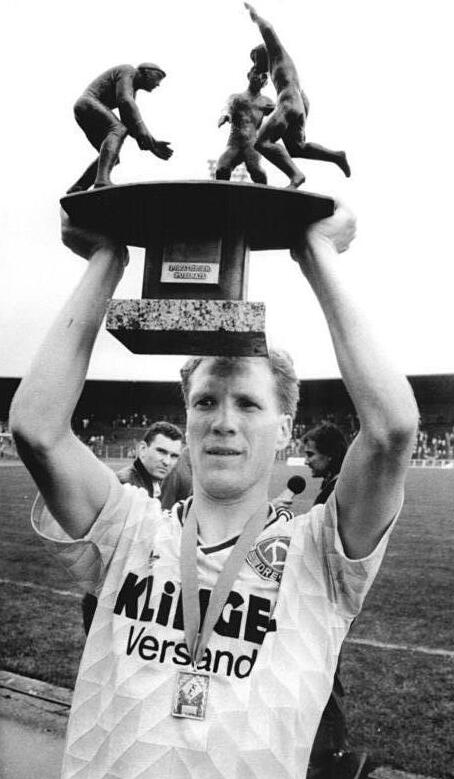
Matthias Sammer lifts the FDGB-Pokal trophy in 1990.

BFC Dynamo stood out among other clubs within SV Dynamo. The club was located at the frontline of the Cold War and was a representative of the capital of East Germany. This meant that the club had to be well-equipped. BFC Dynamo was considered the favorite club of the president of SV Dynamo and the head of the Stasi Erich Mielke. Under the patronage of Erich Mielke and the Stasi, BFC Dynamo would get access to the best training facilities, equipment, coaching staff and talents.

East German football had generally been set up in favour of the designated football clubs (FC), who had access to talents within designated areas. Dynamo Dresden was a center of excellence in Bezirk Dresden, which meant that the club had privileged access to talents in the whole regional district. However, BFC Dynamo would be able to draw on talents from all parts of East Germany, except Bezirk Dresden. The club benefited from a nationwide scouting network, supported by numerous training centers (TZ) of SV Dynamo. BFC Dynamo would have the best material conditions in the league and the best team by far. BFC Dynamo won ten consecutive titles, from 1979 to 1988. Of all clubs, Dynamo Dresden was the most affected by their success, finishing runners-up on six occasions.

However, Dynamo Dresden also had its patrons. According to Hans-Jürgen Dörner, the club was helped to remain a top club by three local politicians. One of them was Hans Modrow, the long-time SED First Secretary in Bezirk Dresden. Another one was Manfred Scheler, the head of the District Council in Bezirk Dresden. Scheler was a devoted fan, who was active in using his connections to provide players with shortage goods and services, such as a car, an apartment or a plumber. A third was Lieutenant general Willi Nyffenegger, the long-time head of the regional district authority of the Volkspolizei in Bezirk Dresden. The club also benefited from support from Stasi Major general Horst Böhm, the head of the regional district administration of the Stasi in Bezirk Dresden. Böhm took involvement in the appointment and dismissal of trainers and the contracts of players. He was also a sponsoring member of the club. According to Hans-Jürgen Dörner, Horst Böhm put local patriotism first in the rivalry with BFC Dynamo. The rivalry between fans of the two Dynamo clubs also spread to units within the Stasi Guards Regiment "Felix E. Dzerzhinsky". Another keen supporter was the long time SED Second Secretary in Bezirk Dresden Lothar Stammnitz Lothar Stammnitz.

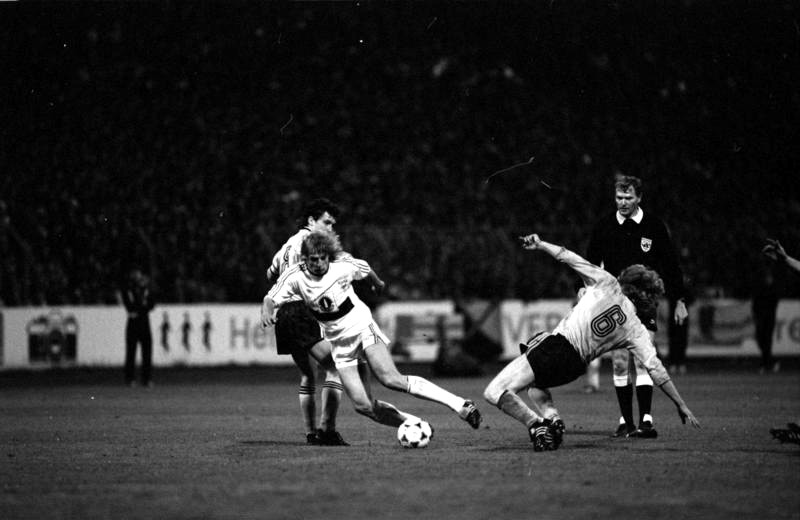
Dynamo v. VfB Stuttgart in the semi-final of the 1988–89 UEFA Cup

Walter Fritzsch had retired in 1978, and was succeeded by Gerhard Prautzsch, who was in turn followed by former players Klaus Sammer (1983–86), Eduard Geyer (1986–90) and Reinhard Häfner (1990–91). The star players of the 1970 were replaced by a new generation, including Torsten Gütschow, Ulf Kirsten, Matthias Sammer, and Andreas Trautmann, although the club lost three key players in 1981: Gerd Weber, who along with teammates Peter Kotte and Matthias Müller had been offered a lucrative contract with 1. FC Köln, intended to flee to the West while in Udine for a national team match against Italy in April 1981. The Stasi discovered this plan, and, in January 1981, the three players were arrested at Schönefeld Airport, from where the national team was about depart for Argentina, and banned for life from the DDR-Oberliga. Extensive activities in preparation for the escape were what put the Stasi on Weber's trail. Weber was sentenced to two years' imprisonment. Kotte and Müller, who had decided to stay in Dresden, were nonetheless punished for their knowledge of Weber's plans. Former SED First Secretary in Bezirk Dresden Hans Modrow believes the measures against the three were "probably cautious overall", given the completely different consequences for other East German citizens in similar contexts. After all, the three were also members of the armed organs (German: Bewaffnete Organe der DDR) with ranks. Weber's escape helpers from Dresden – a technologist, a civil engineer and a waitress – received even harsher punishments. Dynamo Dresden won the FDGB-Pokal three times (1982 and 1984, 1985).

During the 1980s, the club continued its regular participation in European football. In the 1985–86 Cup Winners' Cup, they were defeated by Bayer Uerdingen of West Germany: having won the first leg 2–0, Dynamo were 3–1 up at half-time in the second leg, when goalkeeper Bernd Jakubowski was injured by Uerdingen's Wolfgang Funkel. Debutant Jens Ramme was introduced, and conceded six goals, as the team lost 7–3. In addition to this, striker Frank Lippmann took the opportunity of the match in Krefeld to escape to the west. Dynamo recorded their best ever European performance in the 1988–89 UEFA Cup, beating AS Roma on the way to a semi-final defeat against VfB Stuttgart. Their last European campaign was the 1990–91 European Cup, which ended in defeat to eventual winners Red Star Belgrade. Dynamo's fans rioted at the second leg, which resulted in the club being banned from Europe for the following season.

The head of the Volkspolizei in Bezirk Dresden was also the head of the branch of SV Dynamo in Bezirk Dresden. The official sponsor (German: Trägerbetrieb) of Dynamo Dresden was the Volkspolizei. Players of Dynamo Dresden were formal employees of the Volkspolizei. Many players then underwent their military service with the Stasi Guards Regiment "Felix E. Dzerzhinsky" and became formal employees of the Stasi. 18 of the 72 players who had played at least once for Dynamo Dresden between 1978 and 1989 had been listed as unofficial collaborators (IM) of the Stasi.

West German chancellor Helmut Kohl attended the match between Dynamo Dresden and FC Carl Zeiss Jena in the 1987–88 DDR-Oberliga on 28 May 1988, during a trip to East Germany with his wife Hannelore and son Peter. Dynamo Dresden ended the ten-year long dominance of BFC Dynamo and won the league title in the 1988–89 season. The title was celebrated after a 5–0 win against 1. FC Union Berlin in front of 27,000 spectators at the Dynamo-Stadion in the last match day on 3 June 1989. Dynamo Dresden won the league title also in the 1989–90 season, adding a cup win, to complete a double.

The Berlin Wall opened on 9 November 1989. The Stasi then lost its influence over football mid-season. BFC Dynamo stood at fourth place in the league after the first half of the season, and only finished the 1989–90 season in fourth place. With the fall of the Berlin Wall, many players in East Germany took the opportunity to head west. Dynamo Dresden lost two players during the summer of 1990: Ulf Kirsten and Matthias Sammer joining Bayer Leverkusen and VfB Stuttgart respectively. With German reunification approaching, many clubs in the East changed their name to shed their Soviet image, and Dynamo Dresden changed from SG to the more traditional 1. FC. The DDR-Oberliga also changed name for its final season: the league, now called the NOFV-Oberliga, was used to determine which places the East German clubs would take in the unified German league. Dynamo Dresden finished second, behind Hansa Rostock, thus qualifying for the Bundesliga.

=== Bundesliga (1991–1995) ===
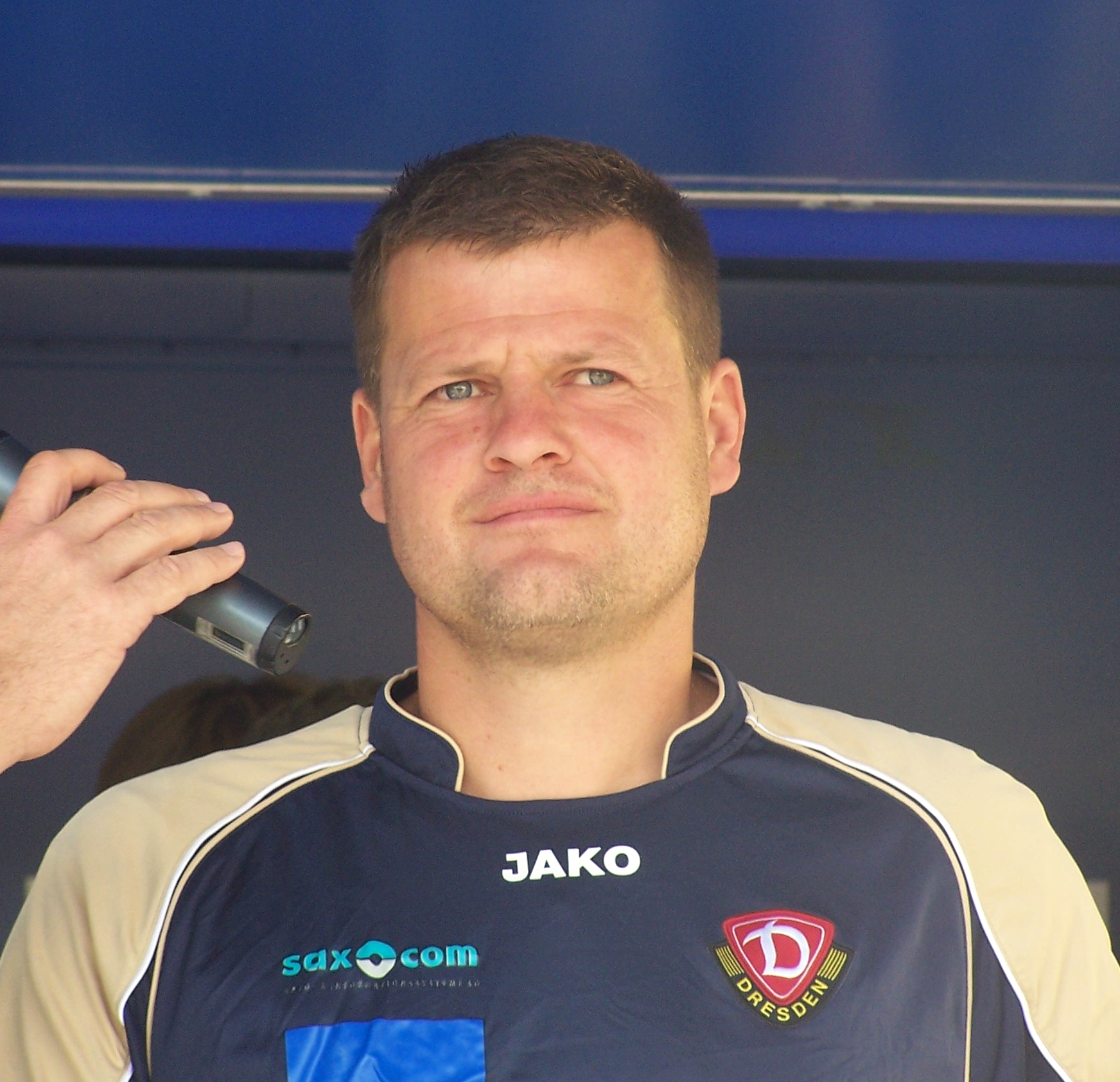
Matthias Maucksch made 118 Bundesliga appearances for Dynamo, more than any other player, and was manager of the club from 2009 to 2011.

Having been among the top clubs in the East, Dynamo found life in the Bundesliga much harder, struggling both financially and on the pitch. They spent four years at this level, during which they were in a near-constant battle against relegation. Their highest placing was 13th in 1993–94, but the following year they were relegated, finishing in last place, having gone through three managers (Sigfried Held, Horst Hrubesch and Ralf Minge) during the season. To add to this, the club had accumulated debts of more than 10 million DM, and were denied a license to play in the 2. Bundesliga, and had to drop down to the third tier Regionalliga Nordost. Rolf-Jürgen Otto, the club's president was jailed for having embezzled around 3 million DM from the club.

While many of the players of the 1980s had moved west, some remained for Dynamo's Bundesliga tenure, including Torsten Gütschow and Hans-Uwe Pilz, while the club was able to attract players from other Eastern clubs, including Olaf Marschall, René Müller and Heiko Scholz. The fall of the wall brought the influx of Dynamo's first foreign players, and the club saw internationals from Australia (Mark Schwarzer), Poland (Piotr Nowak), Russia (Stanislav Cherchesov) and Sweden (Johnny Ekström), among others.

=== Ups and downs (1995–2006) ===
Dynamo sought to regroup in the Regionalliga, and again looked to former players to manage the team, being led by Hans-Jürgen Kreische (1995–96), Udo Schmuck (1996) and Hartmut Schade (1996–1998), but did not seriously challenge for promotion. In 1998, they finished second in the table, but with 60 points: 32 behind champions Tennis Borussia Berlin. 1999–2000 saw a restructuring of the Regionalliga: the four leagues were to be reduced to two, and Dynamo would have to finish in the top 7 to avoid relegation. Having finished 11th in the previous season they turned to Colin Bell, an English coach who had had some success with youth football in Germany, but he left in March 2000 after poor results and a player revolt. Cor Pot, a Dutchman, was brought in to replace him. The club finished in eighth place, and were relegated to the fourth-tier Oberliga Nordost-Süd. By this point Dynamo were not even the top team in Dresden: Dresdner SC had returned after reunification, and finished as runners-up in the Regionalliga Nordost in 2000.

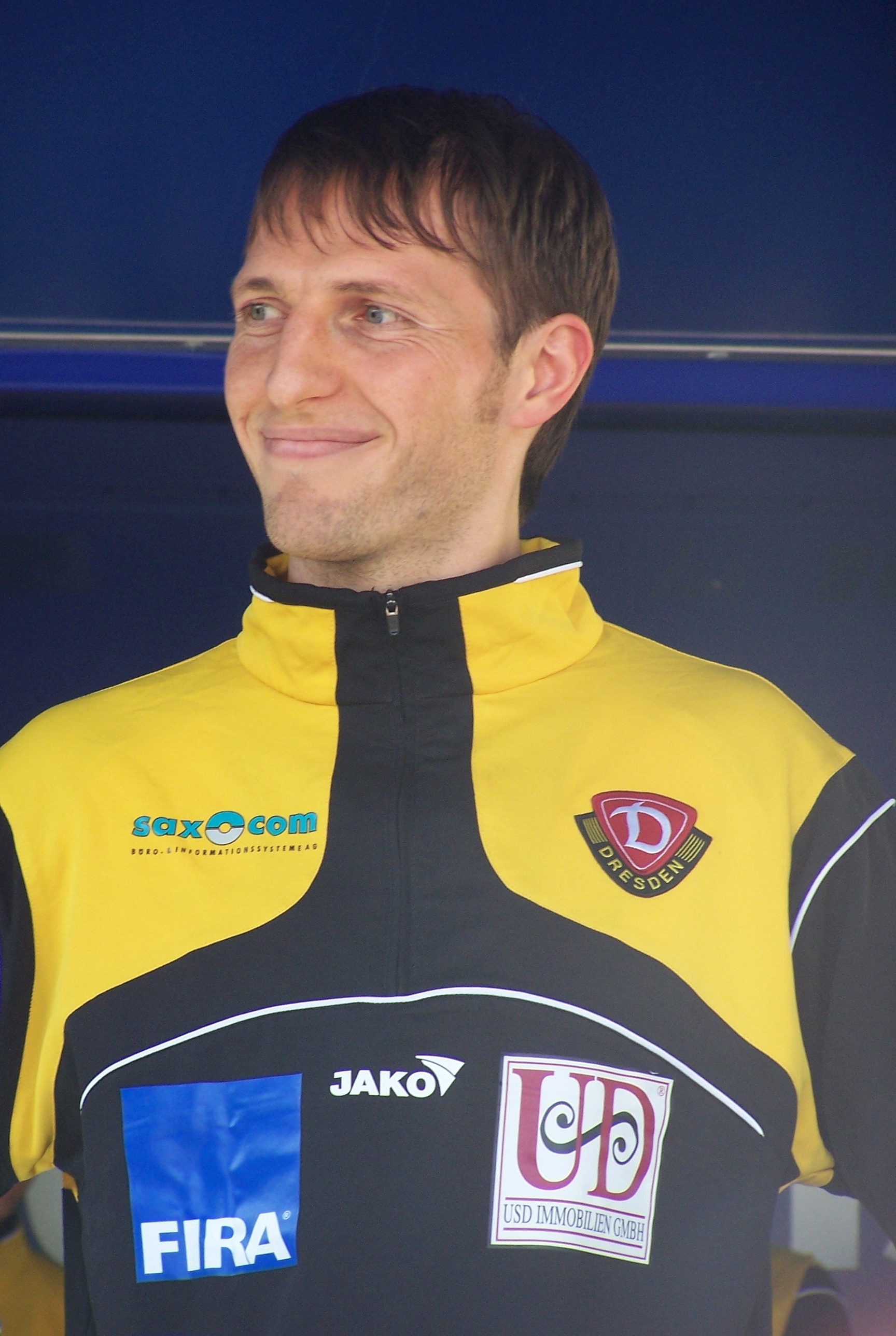
Volker Oppitz was a key player in Dynamo's rise from the Oberliga to the 2. Bundesliga.

The slogan "Wir kommen wieder" (we're coming back), was adopted. However, the Oberliga was now highly competitive with VfB Leipzig, 1. FC Magdeburg and FSV Zwickau also having been relegated, and Dynamo were unable to match the consistency of their main promotion rivals Magdeburg and Leipzig. A 2–1 defeat against Magdeburg in February ended their promotion chances, and Pot resigned. Dynamo finished in fifth place. For the following season, Christoph Franke was brought in as manager, and led the club to promotion – they won the league with only two defeats, and beat Hertha BSC's reserve team in a playoff to earn their place in the Regionalliga Nord. Dynamo's youth system during this period produced players including Lars Jungnickel, Silvio Schröter, Maik Wagefeld and Daniel Ziebig who went on to play at a higher level.

Dynamo finished 7th in their first season back in the third tier, and followed that with another promotion, finishing second behind Rot-Weiß Essen. Life in the 2. Bundesliga began brightly, with a 3–1 win against MSV Duisburg, but by the halfway point of their first season they were facing relegation, with only 18 points. They recovered strongly in the second half of the season though, and finished in 8th place, thanks in part to signings such as Ansgar Brinkmann, Joshua Kennedy and Klemen Lavric. The 2005–06 season began in a similar way, as Dynamo climbed to third place with a 2–1 win over 1860 Munich in the Allianz Arena, but this was followed by thirteen matches without a win, resulting in the dismissal of Christoph Franke. Austrian manager Peter Pacult was brought in, with results improving temporarily, but Dynamo still failed to avoid relegation, finishing 15th.

=== Consolidation (2006–present) ===
Dynamo were back in the Regionalliga with the immediate aim of promotion, yet, despite a successful start, Peter Pacult left the club after six matches for a chance to manage his former club, Rapid Vienna. He was replaced by Norbert Meier, but Dynamo could not keep up their promotion bid, and finished seventh, due in part to poor away form. Another re-organisation of the league structure was approaching and Dynamo knew they would have to finish in the top-10 to qualify for the new national 3. Liga. A number of former players returned, including Lars Jungnickel, Marek Penksa and Maik Wagefeld, but results were inconsistent, and Meier was dismissed, replaced by former coach Eduard Geyer. Dynamo secured qualification on the last day, finishing eighth, but Geyer was dismissed due to disagreements with the board. In 2007, the club reverted to the name SG Dynamo Dresden.

The club turned to Ruud Kaiser, a Dutchman, as Geyer's replacement. They played in the first ever match of the third Liga, defeating Rot-Weiß Erfurt 1–0 with a goal from Halil Savran, but results were inconsistent, and they could only finish in mid-table. The 2009–10 season began poorly, and Kaiser was dismissed and subsequently replaced by Matthias Maucksch, a former player who had had some success with the reserve team. Maucksch guided the team away from relegation, and the club finished the season in 12th place. Maucksch led the team to contention for a playoff place during the 2010–11 season, but was dismissed in April after a run of five games without a win, and was replaced by Ralf Loose. Loose ended the season unbeaten and secured third place, and a playoff against VfL Osnabrück which Dynamo won 4–2 on aggregate to earn promotion to the 2. Bundesliga.

Dynamo Dresden performed well in their first season back in the league. Consistently holding a position in the middle of the standings, the team was never in danger of being relegated. They secured a notable 4–3 victory after being down three goals against Bayer Leverkusen in the first round of the 2011–12 DFB-Pokal season. Dynamo were initially excluded from the 2012–2013 DFB-Pokal due to poor fan behaviour during the second round match against Borussia Dortmund (0–2). This punishment was later turned into one Game behind closed doors and one away game without own fan support. Virtual tickets were offered to reduce the financial loss, leading to what was purported to be the first sold-out ghost game in history.

The 2012–13 season started poorly for Dynamo and Ralf Loose was dismissed in December 2012 after a 3–0 defeat to VfL Bochum. He was replaced by Peter Pacult, returning to the club after more than six years. Dynamo's form improved after Pacult's arrival, but the team still finished the league as 16th. Due to this, Dynamo had to enter relegation play-offs again after just two seasons, incidentally meeting VfL Osnabrück once more, with their roles now reversed. Dynamo emerged victorious with 2–1 on aggregate and remained in the second tier for the 2013–14 season. Pacult was dismissed in August 2013 after a poor start and replaced with Olaf Janßen. Jansen was unable to save the club from the drop to the 3. Liga after they lost 3–2 at home to relegation rivals Arminia Bielefeld to drop into 17th place, a result which ultimately cost Jansen his job. Dynamo had drawn half of their matches, winning just five all season.

Under their new coach Stefan Böger, the club completely overhauled the squad with the intent of returning to the 2. Bundesliga as soon as possible. In August 2014, the team eliminated FC Schalke 04 from the first round of the DFB-Pokal, defeating them 2–1. The team advanced to the third round after defeating VfL Bochum 2–1, but were ultimately knocked out by Borussia Dortmund. Böger was sacked in February 2015, with assistant coach Peter Németh taking over for the remainder for the season. The team finished 6th in the 2014–15 season. Under new manager Uwe Neuhaus, Dynamo went on to have a successful season, and officially returned to second-level competition after a 2–2 draw at an away match against FC Magdeburg on 16 April 2016.

== Season-by-season record ==
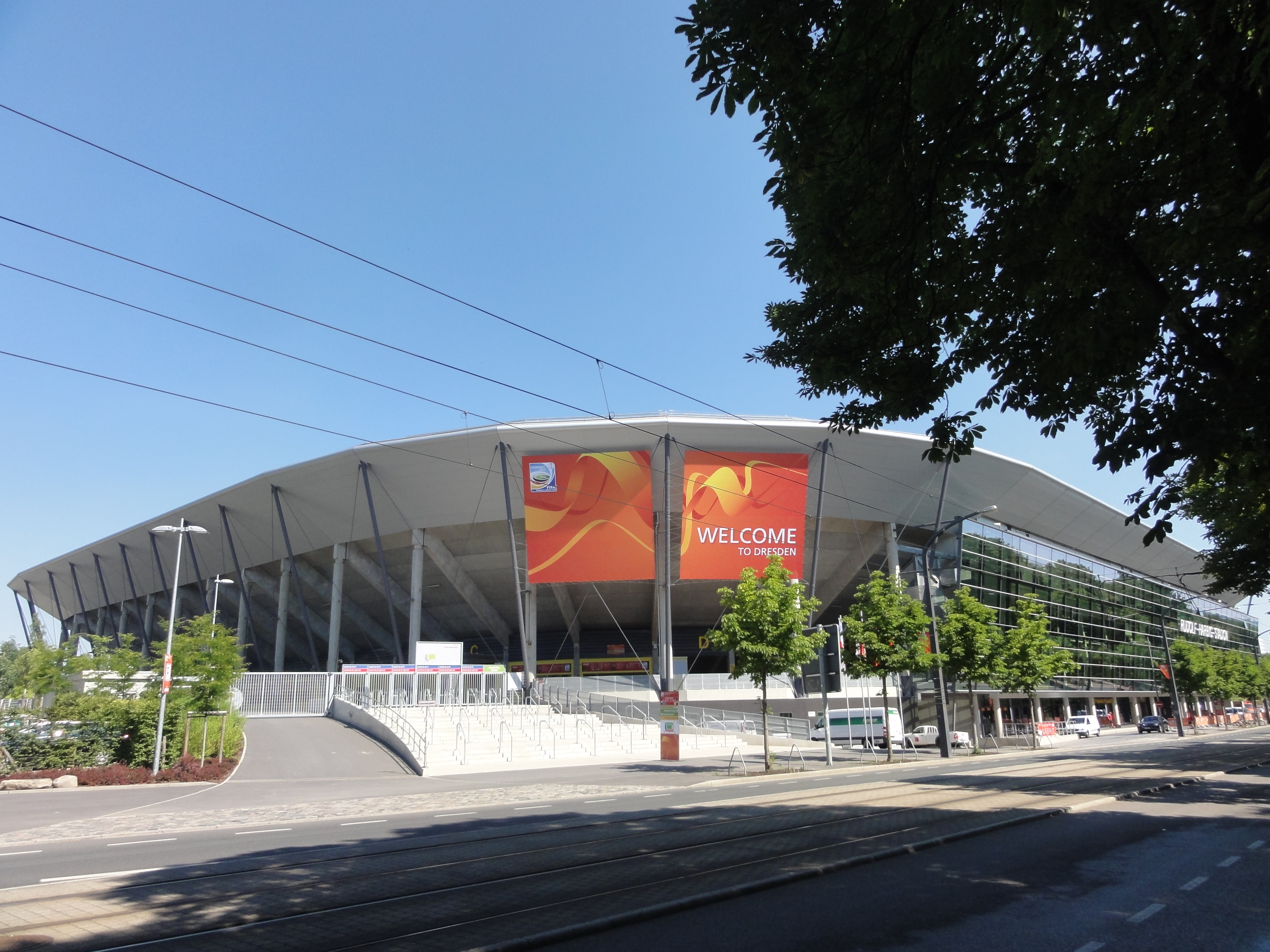
Exterior stadium view

== SV Dynamo ==
When they were founded as SG Volkspolizei, the club was sponsored by the East German police force, and in 1953, when they became Dynamo Dresden which were part of the SV Dynamo, the sport organization of security agencies. Dynamo was the most powerful of all the sports societies, and this conferred advantages on the club. While many former security service clubs have struggled to shed their negative image due to prior history as an East German football club, particularly BFC Dynamo, Dynamo Dresden remain popular and well-supported by their fans, having come to represent their home city of Dresden

== Stadium ==
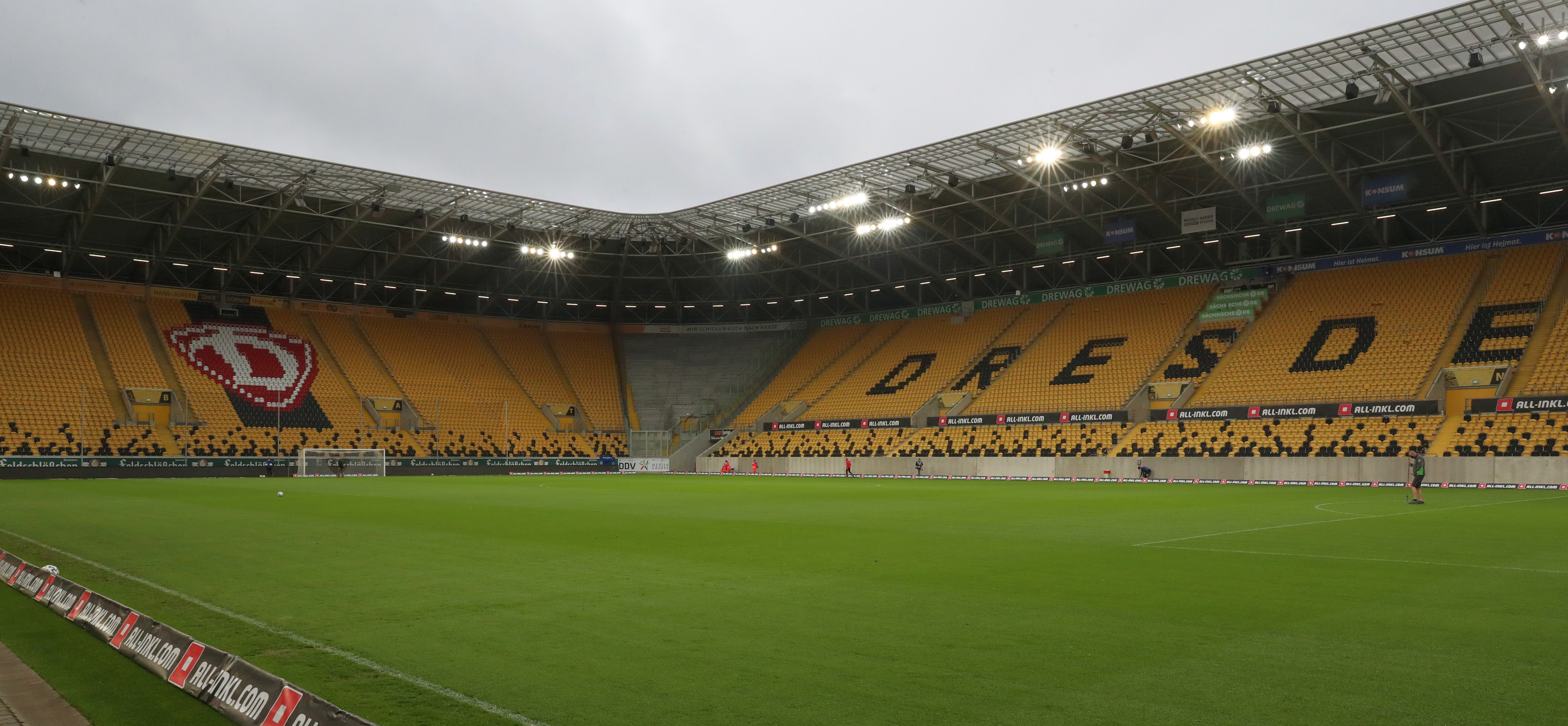
Rudolf-Harbig-Stadion

Dynamo plays at the Rudolf-Harbig-Stadion, which was opened in 1923, and also originally named the Rudolf-Harbig-Stadion after local track and field athlete Rudolf Harbig. The stadium was renamed Dynamo-Stadion by the East German authorities in 1971, but reverted to its former name after the reunification. With an original capacity of 24,000 spectators, the stadium was rebuilt in the beginning of the 1990s, in line with DFB and FIFA regulations, and was thoroughly modernised between June 2007 and December 2009. The modernized stadium opened on 15 September 2009 with a friendly match against Schalke 04 and has a capacity of 32,066 spectators.

== Supporters ==
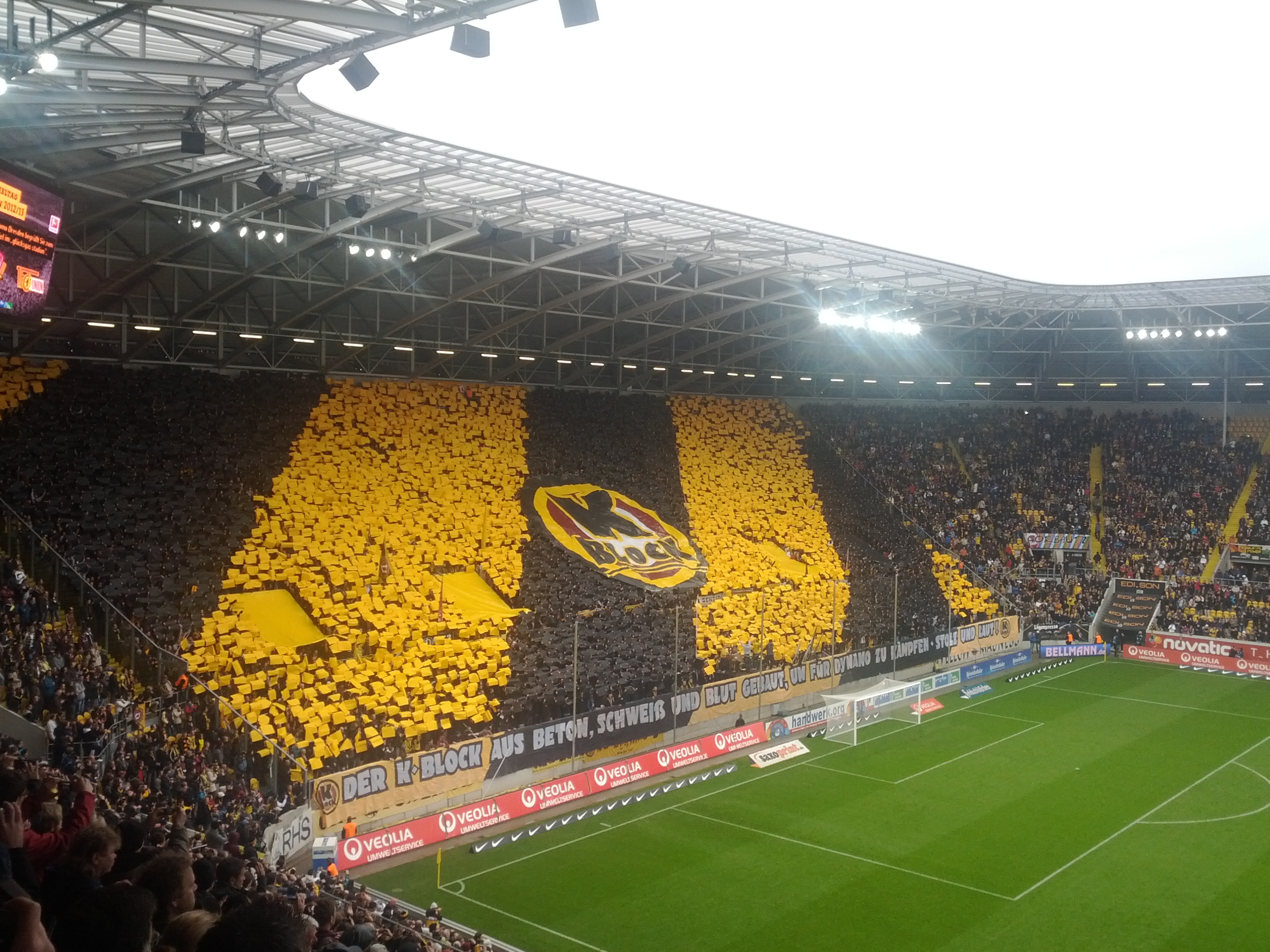
The K-Block terrace of the Rudolf-Harbig-Stadion

Dynamo were one of East Germany's best-supported clubs, regularly drawing crowds of around 25,000 during their most successful period. Since reunification attendance levels have fluctuated along with the team's fortunes, while they were still one of the most well-supported teams in the lower leagues, drawing an average of around 10–15,000 fans in the 3. Liga. Following their 2011 advance to the 2nd League, they were again drawing crowds of 25,000. The 2013–14 season average attendance reached 27,004. Dynamo's supporters have very close relations with FK Sarajevo fans, Horde zla. In December 2020, Dynamo fans bought 72,000 tickets for the cup match at home to Darmstadt, even though it was played in an empty stadium – to show support for the struggling club.

== Relationships with other clubs ==
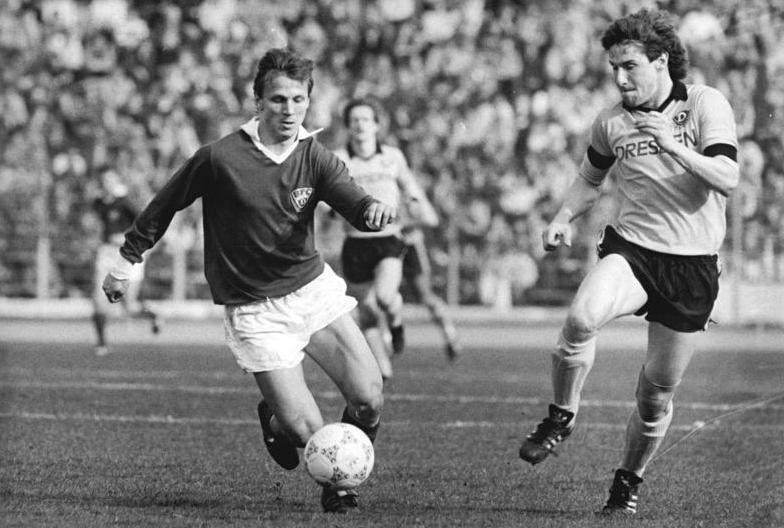
The two Dynamos meet in 1988: Andreas Thom of Berlin (left) and Andreas Trautmann of Dresden (right).

Dynamo Dresden have a particularly fractious relationship with BFC Dynamo, who took over the first team and the place in the DDR-Oberliga from Dynamo Dresden in 1954, then as a football section of SC Dynamo Berlin.

1. FC Lokomotive Leipzig were traditionally Dynamo's main rivals in the battle for Saxon dominance, although this rivalry extends to other clubs, including Chemnitzer FC, formerly FC Sachsen Leipzig, Erzgebirge Aue, and, most recently, RB Leipzig, though the clubs' disparate financial capabilities have so far prevented them from ever playing in the same division, their only official encounter thus far being a first-round match in the 2016–17 DFB-Pokal season, in which Dresden celebrated a victory.

Dynamo's most noteworthy rival in their home city are Dresdner SC. Another club, SC Borea Dresden were formed out of SG Dynamo Dresden-Heide, a former feeder club for Dynamo, but there is no longer an official connection.

== Colours and crest ==
Crest of Dynamo Dresden from 1990 – 2002

When they were formed as SG Volkspolizei Dresden, the club wore green and white, the colours of the former province of Saxony. Green and white were the colours of the Volkspolizei. When the team became part of SV Dynamo they adopted the sports society's wine red colour scheme. In 1968, the club was declared a regional center of excellence in Bezirk Dresden and adopted its current colours of yellow and black, the city colours of Dresden.

The club's original crest was built around the shield of the Volkspolizei, to whom they were affiliated. In 1953 they adopted the D logo of SV Dynamo, which was retained until reunification, when its wine red background was replaced with Saxon green. They reverted to the red background in the early 2000s.

== Players ==
=== Current squad ===
As of 2 September 2026

Note: Flags indicate national team as defined under FIFA eligibility rules; some limited exceptions apply. Players may hold more than one non-FIFA nationality.

No.	Pos.	Nation	Player
1	GK	GER	Tim Schreiber
4	DF	GER	Kenneth Schmidt
6	DF	GER	Nicolai Rapp
7	FW	GER	Kennedy Okpala (on loan from SC Paderborn)
8	MF	GER	Luca Herrmann
9	FW	NED	Vincent Vermeij
10	MF	GER	Jakob Lemmer
11	FW	TUR	Kaan İnanoğlu
14	DF	GER	Brooklyn Ezeh
16	FW	SWE	Nils Fröling
17	DF	AUT	Ahmet Muhamedbegović
18	MF	GER	Robert Wagner
19	DF	GER	Alexander Rossipal
20	FW	GER	Ben Bobzien

No.	Pos.	Nation	Player
21	MF	GER	Tobias Raschl
22	GK	GER	Lennart Grill
23	DF	GER	Lars Bünning
24	MF	CRO	Patrice Čović (on loan from Werder Bremen)
27	MF	GER	Niklas Hauptmann (captain)
29	DF	GER	Lukas Boeder
32	DF	GER	Jonas Sterner
33	FW	GER	Christoph Daferner
34	DF	GER	Till Neininger (on loan from VfL Wolfsburg)
37	GK	GER	Daniel Mesenhöler
39	DF	GER	Thomas Keller
40	GK	GER	Elias Bethke
42	DF	GER	Friedrich Müller
44	DF	ITA	Simon Straudi

=== Out on loan ===
Note: Flags indicate national team as defined under FIFA eligibility rules; some limited exceptions apply. Players may hold more than one non-FIFA nationality.

No.	Pos.	Nation	Player
—	MF	GER	Tony Menzel (at Rot-Weiss Essen until 30 June 2027)
—	FW	GER	Marlon Faß (at Sonnenhof Großaspach until 30 June 2027)

== Dynamo Dresden II ==
The club's reserve team, Dynamo Dresden II, played until 2015 in the tier five NOFV-Oberliga Süd. It has played at this level since 2009 with a fourth place in 2012 as its best result. In March 2015, the club announced that it would withdraw the reserve team from league competition and instead enter it in a friendlies competition with the reserve teams of Chemnitzer FC, Hallescher FC, Sparta Prague, FC Slovan Liberec and FK Teplice. However, though the competition's name Future League would suggest a more organized and concrete structure, this has so far led to little more than an incoherent series of friendly matches between amateur teams, with the idea appearing to have been largely abandoned by the participating clubs, despite some declarations of intent.

The team also made a losing appearance in the 1995 Saxony Cup final and won the competition in 2009.

== Club staff ==
Position	Name
Head coach	(Switzerland) Thomas Stamm
Assistant coach	(Germany) Manuel Klökler (Germany) Heiko Scholz
Assistant coach / Video analyst	(Germany) Valentin Vochatzer
Goalkeeper coach	(United States) David Yelldell
Athletics and conditioning coach	(Germany) Matthias Grahé
Managing director finance	(Germany) Stephan Zimmermann
Managing director sport	(Germany) Sören Gonther
Head of first team football	(Germany) Christian Knoll
Club representative	(Germany) Ulf Kirsten
Chief scout	(Germany) Stephan Engels
Scout	(Germany) Felix Schimmel
Club doctor	(Germany) Dr. Michael Bata
Head of physiotherapy	(Germany) Henrik Lange
Physiotherapist	(Germany) Tony Fischer (Germany) Laura Seifert (Germany) Leon Fiebig (Germany) Henry Anschütz
Head of sports science	(Uruguay) José Portela
Press officer	(Germany) Christoph Antal
Supporter liaison officer	(Germany) Marek Lange
Team manager	(Germany) Justin Löwe
Marketing staff	(Germany) Sebastian Schmidt
Head of media and communications	(Germany) Ronny Zimmermann
Equipment manager	(Germany) Tom Teichert-Tölg
Stadium announcer	(Germany) Peter Hauskeller
Academy manager	(Germany) Marco Hartmann

== Coaching history ==
Dynamo enjoyed its greatest successes under Walter Fritzsch, capturing the first division DDR-Oberliga title in 1971, 1973, 1976, 1977, 1978, as well as finishing as vice-champions four times. The team also took the East German Cup (FDGB Pokal) in 1971 and 1977.

- Fritz Sack 07/1950 – 9/1951
- Rolf Kukowitsch 09/1951 – 04/1952
- Paul Döring 04/1952 – 07/1953
- Janos Gyarmati 07/1953 – 04/1954
- Helmut Petzold 04/1954 – 11/1955
- Heinz Werner 01/1956 – 06/1956
- Rolf Kukowitsch 07/1956 – 12/1956
- Helmut Petzold 01/1957 – 05/1966
- Manfred Fuchs 06/1966 – 03/1968
- Kurt Kresse 03/1968 – 06/1969
- Walter Fritzsch 06/1969 – 06/1978
- Gerhard Prautzsch 06/1978 – 06/1983
- Klaus Sammer 07/1983 – 06/1986
- Eduard Geyer 07/1986 – 04/1990
- Reinhard Häfner 04/1990 – 06/1991
- Helmut Schulte 06/1991 – 05/1992
- Klaus Sammer 06/1992 – 04/1993
- Ralf Minge 04/1993 – 06/1993
- Sigfried Held 06/1993 – 11/1994
- Horst Hrubesch 11/1994 – 02/1995
- Ralf Minge 02/1995 – 06/1995
- Hans-Jürgen Kreische 06/1995 – 04/1996
- Udo Schmuck 04/1996 – 09/1996
- Hartmut Schade 09/1996 – 03/1998
- Werner Voigt 04/1998 – 12/1998
- Damian Halata 12/1998 – 02/1999
- Rolf Schafstall 02/1999 – 03/1999
- Colin Bell 04/1999 – 03/2000
- Cor Pot 03/2000 – 03/2001
- Meinhard Hemp 03/2001 – 06/2001
- Christoph Franke 07/2001 – 12/2005
- Peter Pacult 12/2005 – 09/2006
- Norbert Meier 09/2006 – 09/2007
- Eduard Geyer 09/2007 – 06/2008
- Ruud Kaiser 06/2008 – 10/2009
- Matthias Maucksch 10/2009 – 04/2011
- Ralf Loose 04/2011 – 12/2012
- Peter Pacult 01/2013 – 08/2013
- Olaf Janßen 09/2013 – 05/2014
- Stefan Böger 05/2014 – 02/2015
- Peter Németh 02/2015 – 06/2015
- Uwe Neuhaus 07/2015 – 08/2018
- Cristian Fiél 08/2018 – 09/2018
- Maik Walpurgis 09/2018 – 02/2019
- Cristian Fiél 02/2019 – 12/2019
- Markus Kauczinski 12/2019 – 04/2021
- Alexander Schmidt 04/2021 – 03/2022
- Guerino Capretti 03/2022 – 06/2022
- Markus Anfang 07/2022 –04/2024
- Heiko Scholz 04/2024 –

== Notable former players ==
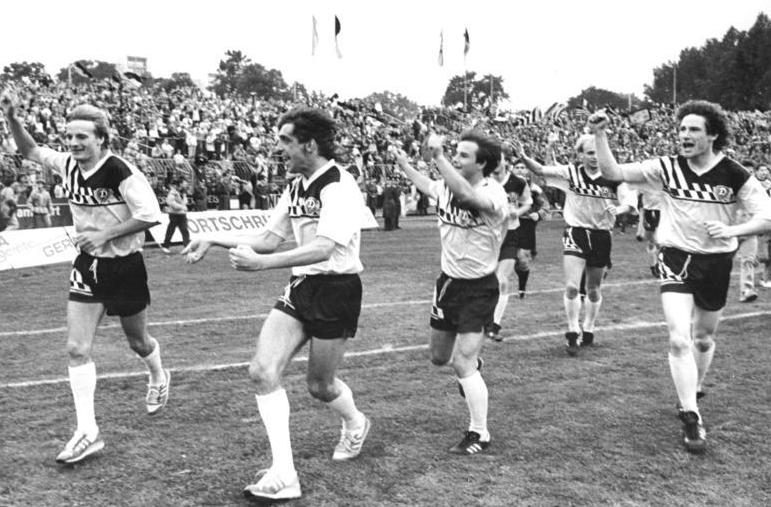
Frank Lieberam, Ralf Minge, Jörg Stübner and Andreas Trautmann celebrate the title in 1989.

As one of the leading clubs in East Germany, Dynamo Dresden provided 36 DDR internationals, including the country's second most-capped player, Hans-Jürgen Dörner, and its joint second top scorer, Hans-Jürgen Kreische. Twelve Dynamo players won Olympic medals, including six gold medallists in 1976. After German reunification a number of Dynamo players went on to represent the Germany national team, including Jens Jeremies, Ulf Kirsten, Olaf Marschall and Alexander Zickler.

Five Dynamo Dresden players were named East German Footballer of the Year: Hans-Jürgen Dörner, Hans-Jürgen Kreische, Andreas Trautmann, Ulf Kirsten and Torsten Gütschow. Dörner won the award three times, and the latter three players were its last three winners. Kreische and Gütschow were the leading scorers in the DDR-Oberliga seven times between them.

Matthias Sammer played for Dynamo Dresden from 1985 to 1990, during which he won 23 caps for East Germany. He later made 51 appearances for Germany, winning the European Championship in 1996 and played at club level for VfB Stuttgart, Internazionale and Borussia Dortmund. With the latter, he won two German titles, the UEFA Champions League and the Intercontinental Cup, and was named European Footballer of the Year in 1996.

== Honours ==
=== Domestic ===
- DDR-Oberliga
  - Champions: 1952–53, 1970–71, 1972–73, 1975–76, 1976–77, 1977–78, 1988–89, 1989–90
  - Runners-up: 1951–52, (Note: Won by SV Deutsche Volkspolizei Dresden.) 1978–79, 1979–80, 1981–82 1983–84, 1984–85, 1986–87, 1990–91
- FDGB-Pokal
  - Winners: 1952, 1970–71, 1976–77, 1981–82, 1983–84, 1984–85, 1989–90 (record, shared with 1. FC Magdeburg)
  - Runners-up: 1971–72, 1973–74, 1974–75, 1977–78
- DFV-Supercup
  - Runners-up: 1989
- Deutschland Cup
  - Winners: 1990
- 3. Liga
  - Champions: 2015–16, 2020–21
  - Play-off winners: 2010–11

=== Regional ===
- Regionalliga Nord (III)
  - Runners-up: 2003–04 (promoted)
- NOFV-Oberliga (IV)
  - Winners: 2002
- Sachsenliga (VI)
  - Winners: 2009 (Note: Won by the reserve team.)
- Saxony Cup (III–VI)
  - Winners: 2003, 2007, 2009, 2024

=== Youth ===
- Next Generation Oberliga (German: Nachwuchsoberliga) (de) (Note: Corresponds to U21 level. The league existed from 1976 to 1983 and 1989 to 1991. The reserve teams of the 14 DDR-Oberliga clubs were no longer allowed to participate in the DDR-Liga after the 1975–76 season. The Junior Oberliga (de) was also disbanded after the season. The Next Generation Oberliga was introduced instead. Youth teams of the 14 DDR-Oberliga clubs were all eligible to start in the 1976–77 Next Generation Oberliga.)
  - Winners: 1979, 1983
  - Runners-up: 1977
- East German Junior Championship (de) (Note: Corresponds to U19 level.)
  - Champions: 1962, 1972, 1981, 1982, 1985, 1988 (record)
  - Runners-up: 1975, 1983, 1984, 1987
- East German Youth Championship (de) (Note: Corresponds to U17 level.)
  - Champions: 1983, 1988, 1989
  - Runners-up: 1982, 1990
- East German Junior Cup (Junge Welt-Pokal) (de)
  - Winners: 1976, 1985, 1986, 1987 (record, shared with 1. FC Lokomotive Leipzig)
- East German Youth Cup (Youth FDGB-Pokal)
  - Winners: 1973, 1989
- U17 NOFV Cup (de)
  - Winners: 2003, 2017
  - Runners-up: 2006

=== Other ===
- Indoor-Regio-Cup
  - Winners: 2007

=== European ===
- UEFA Cup
  - Semi-finalists: 1988–89
- Intertoto Cup
  - Co-winners: 1993

=== Doubles ===
- DDR-Oberliga and FDGB-Pokal
  - Winners: 1970–71, 1976–77, 1989–90 (record)

== In Europe ==
Season	Competition	Round	Nation	Club	Score
1967–68	Inter-Cities Fairs Cup	1st round	(Scotland)	Rangers	1–1, 1–2
1970–71	Inter-Cities Fairs Cup	1st round	(Socialist Federal Republic of Yugoslavia)	Partizan	0–0, 6–0
1970–71	Inter-Cities Fairs Cup	2nd round	(England)	Leeds United	0–1, 2–1
1971–72	European Champion Clubs' Cup	1st round	(Netherlands)	Ajax Amsterdam	0–2, 0–0
1972–73	UEFA Cup	1st round	(Austria)	VÖEST Linz	2–0, 2–2
1972–73	UEFA Cup	2nd round	(Poland)	Ruch Chorzów	1–0, 3–0
1972–73	UEFA Cup	Last 16	(Portugal)	FC Porto	2–1, 1–0
1972–73	UEFA Cup	Quarter–finals	(England)	Liverpool	0–2, 0–1
1973–74	European Champion Clubs' Cup	1st round	(Italy)	Juventus	2–0, 2–3
1973–74	European Champion Clubs' Cup	Last 16	(West Germany)	Bayern Munich	3–4, 3–3
1974–75	UEFA Cup	1st round	(Denmark)	Randers Freja	1–1, 0–0
1974–75	UEFA Cup	2nd round	(Soviet Union)	Dynamo Moscow	1–0, 0–1 (4–3 a.p.)
1974–75	UEFA Cup	Last 16	(West Germany)	Hamburger SV	1–4, 2–2
1975–76	UEFA Cup	1st round	(Romania)	ASA Târgu Mureș	2–2, 4–1
1975–76	UEFA Cup	2nd round	(Hungary)	Budapest Honvéd	2–2, 3–0
1975–76	UEFA Cup	Last 16	(Soviet Union)	Torpedo Moscow	3–0, 1–1
1975–76	UEFA Cup	Quarter–finals	(England)	Liverpool	0–0, 1–2
1976–77	European Champion Clubs' Cup	1st round	(Portugal)	Benfica	2–0, 0–0
1976–77	European Champion Clubs' Cup	Last 16	(Hungary)	Ferencváros	0–1, 4–0
1976–77	European Champion Clubs' Cup	Quarter–finals	(Switzerland)	Zürich	1–2, 3–2
1977–78	European Champion Clubs' Cup	1st round	(Sweden)	Halmstads BK	2–0, 1–2
1977–78	European Champion Clubs' Cup	Last 16	(England)	Liverpool	1–5, 2–1
1978–79	European Champion Clubs' Cup	1st round	(Socialist Federal Republic of Yugoslavia)	Partizan	0–2, 2–0 (5–4 a.p.)
1978–79	European Champion Clubs' Cup	Last 16	(Republic of Ireland)	Bohemian	0–0, 6–0
1978–79	European Champion Clubs' Cup	Quarter–finals	(Austria)	Austria Wien	1–3, 1–0
1979–80	UEFA Cup	1st round	(Spain)	Atlético Madrid	2–1, 3–0
1979–80	UEFA Cup	2nd round	(West Germany)	VfB Stuttgart	1–1, 0–0
1980–81	UEFA Cup	1st round	(Socialist Federal Republic of Yugoslavia)	Napredak Kruševac	1–0, 1–0
1980–81	UEFA Cup	2nd round	(Netherlands)	Twente	1–1, 0–0
1980–81	UEFA Cup	Last 16	(Belgium)	Standard Liège	1–1, 1–4
1981–82	UEFA Cup	1st round	(Soviet Union)	Zenit Leningrad	2–1, 4–1
1981–82	UEFA Cup	2nd round	(Netherlands)	Feyenoord	1–2, 1–1
1982–83	UEFA Cup Winners' Cup	1st round	(Denmark)	B93 Kopenhagen	3–2, 1–2
1984–85	UEFA Cup Winners' Cup	1st round	(Sweden)	Malmö FF	0–2, 4–1
1984–85	UEFA Cup Winners' Cup	Last 16	(France)	Metz	3–1, 0–0
1984–85	UEFA Cup Winners' Cup	Quarter–finals	(Austria)	Rapid Wien	3–0, 0–5
1985–86	UEFA Cup Winners' Cup	1st round	(Belgium)	Cercle Brugge	2–3, 2–1
1985–86	UEFA Cup Winners' Cup	Last 16	(Finland)	HJK Helsinki	0–1, 7–2
1985–86	UEFA Cup Winners' Cup	Quarter–finals	(West Germany)	Bayer Uerdingen	2–0, 3–7
1987–88	UEFA Cup	1st round	(Soviet Union)	Spartak Moscow	0–3, 1–0
1988–89	UEFA Cup	1st round	(Scotland)	Aberdeen	0–0, 2–0
1988–89	UEFA Cup	2nd round	(Belgium)	Waregem	4–1, 1–2
1988–89	UEFA Cup	Last 16	(Italy)	Roma	2–0, 2–0
1988–89	UEFA Cup	Quarter–finals	(Romania)	Victoria Bucuresti	1–1, 4–0
1988–89	UEFA Cup	Semi–finals	(West Germany)	VfB Stuttgart	0–1, 1–1
1989–90	European Champion Clubs' Cup	1st round	(Greece)	AEK Athens	1–0, 3–5
1990–91	European Champion Clubs' Cup	1st round	(Luxembourg)	Union Luxembourg	3–1, 3–0
1990–91	European Champion Clubs' Cup	Last 16	(Sweden)	Malmö FF	1–1, 1–1 (5–4 a.p.)
1990–91	European Champion Clubs' Cup	Quarter–finals	(Socialist Federal Republic of Yugoslavia)	Red Star Belgrade	0–3, 0–3 (match abandoned)

=== European record ===
Competition	Record				
Competition	G	W	D	L	Win %
European Cup	30	12	6	12	40.00
UEFA Cup	48	21	17	10	43.75
UEFA Cup Winners' Cup	14	7	1	6	50.00
Inter-Cities Fairs Cup	6	2	2	2	33.33
Total	98	42	26	30	42.86
