= Hans-Jürgen Dörner =

East German footballer and coach (1951–2022)

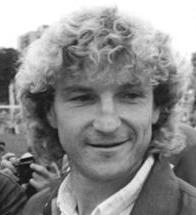
- Dörner in 1986

Personal information
- Date of birth: 25 January 1951
- Place of birth: Görlitz, East Germany
- Date of death: 19 January 2022 (aged 70)
- Place of death: Dresden, Saxony, Germany
- Height: 1.75 m (5 ft 9 in)
- Positions: Sweeper; full-back

Youth career
- 1959–1960: BSG Energie Görlitz
- 1960–1967: BSG Motor WAMA Görlitz
- 1967–1968: Dynamo Dresden

Senior career*
Years	Team	Apps	(Gls)
1968–1985	Dynamo Dresden	400	(70)

International career
1968–1969	East Germany U-18	17	(2)
1969–1974	East Germany U-23	16	(0)
1971–1976	East Germany Olympic	10	(4)
1969–1985	East Germany	96	(8)

Managerial career
- 1985–1990: East Germany Under-23
- 1996–1997: Werder Bremen
- 1998–1999: FSV Zwickau
- 2000–2001: Al Ahly
- 2001–2003: VfB Leipzig
- 2006–2010: Radebeuler BC 08
Medal record
Representing East Germany
Men's Football
Gold medal – first place	1976 Montreal	Team competition
- * Club domestic league appearances and goals

Hans-Jürgen "Dixie" Dörner (25 January 1951 – 19 January 2022) was a German football player and coach. He distinguished himself during his career by being named East Germany's player of the year three times (1977, 1984 and 1985) – the only East German player to do this besides goalkeeper Jürgen Croy.

== Playing career ==
Dörner's playing career began in his hometown of Görlitz in 1960 with amateur club BSG Energie WAMA Görlitz, and then BSG Motor WAMA Görlitz. He joined Dynamo Dresden in 1968 where he won five first division DDR-Oberliga titles and five FDGB-Pokale (East German Cup), twice winning the DDR-Oberliga and FDGB-Pokal double. He captained Dynamo Dresden from 1977 until his retirement, and is the club's most decorated captain. He was voted the team's greatest player ever in 1999.

During his time at Dynamo Dresden, the club finished outside the top three in the DDR-Oberliga only once, which was a seventh place finish in the 1982–83 season.

He captained the team to their best European seasons, twice reaching the quarter finals of the European Clubs' Champions Cup in 1977 and 1979. He also guided his team to quarter finals in the 1975–76 UEFA Cup and both the 1984–85 and the 1985–86 UEFA Cup Winners' Cup. This was seen as a great success against teams from Europe's big leagues. Dörner scored an amazing 65 goals in 392 top-flight games for Dynamo Dresden, a record for a defender in the DDR-Oberliga.

He was capped 96 times for East Germany, winning a gold medal as a vital part of that country's Olympic team at the 1976 Montreal Olympics.

== Coaching career ==
His career as a player ended in 1986, and he later took on the role of trainer for the East German Olympic squad in 1990. After German re-unification, he coached the Olympic youth side of the united country. From 6 January 1996 until 20 August 1997 he was the coach for Bundesliga club Werder Bremen. From 2006 to 2010 he coached Radebeuler BC 08 in the city league known as the Bezirksliga Dresden.

== Death ==
Dörner died on 19 January 2022, at the age of 70.

== Honours ==
Dynamo Dresden

- DDR-Oberliga: 1970–71, 1972–73, 1975–76, 1976–77, 1977–78; runner-up: 1978–79, 1979–80, 1981–82, 1983–84, 1984–85
- FDGB-Pokal: 1970–71, 1976–77, 1981–82, 1983–84, 1984–85

== See also ==
- List of men's footballers with 100 or more international caps
