= Klaus Sammer =

German football player and coach (born 1942)

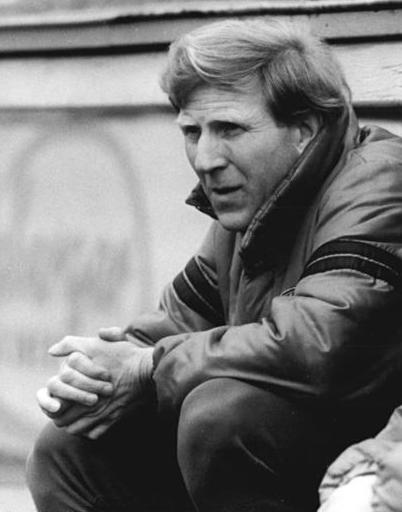
- Sammer as manager of Dynamo Dresden in 1986

Personal information
- Date of birth: 5 December 1942 (age 83)
- Place of birth: Gröditz, Germany
- Height: 1.92 m (6 ft 4 in)
- Position: Midfielder

Youth career
- 1954–1962: TSG Stahl Gröditz

Senior career*
Years	Team	Apps	(Gls)
1962–1965	SC Einheit Dresden	65	(18)
1965–1975	Dynamo Dresden	209	(29)

International career
1970–1973	East Germany	17	(0)

Managerial career
- 1983–1986: Dynamo Dresden
- 1992–1993: Dynamo Dresden
- * Club domestic league appearances and goals

Klaus Sammer (born 5 December 1942) is a German former professional football player and coach. He spent the early part of his career with Stahl Gröditz and Einheit Dresden, before joining Dynamo Dresden, the club where he would spend the majority of his career, in 1965. In eleven seasons as a Dynamo player he won two East German titles and one cup, and played 17 times for the East Germany national team. After retiring in 1975 he took up coaching, and managed Dynamo Dresden from 1983 to 1986, winning two cups in a period dominated by the state-favoured BFC Dynamo. His tenure ended after a disastrous defeat against Bayer Uerdingen in the Cup Winners' Cup – Dynamo were 2–0 up after the first leg, and 3–1 up at half-time in the second, but proceeded to be knocked out with a 7–3 defeat. He returned to the manager's job in 1992, with the club now in the Bundesliga after reunification, but this spell only lasted one year. He has since worked in various roles for the German Football Association.

Klaus Sammer is the father of Matthias Sammer, who began his career under him at Dynamo Dresden, and went on to play for both East Germany and the united Germany, and was European Player of the Year in 1996.
