= 1988–89 DDR-Oberliga =

DDR-Oberliga
- Season: 1988–89
- Champions: Dynamo Dresden
- Relegated: BSG Sachsenring Zwickau; 1. FC Union Berlin
- European Cup: Dynamo Dresden
- European Cup Winners' Cup: BFC Dynamo
- UEFA Cup: FC Karl-Marx-Stadt; F.C. Hansa Rostock
- Matches: 182
- Goals: 503 (2.76 per match)
- Top goalscorer: Torsten Gütschow (17)
- Total attendance: 1,857,830
- Average attendance: 10,208

The 1988–89 DDR-Oberliga was the 40th season of the DDR-Oberliga, the first tier of league football in East Germany.

The league was contested by fourteen teams. Dynamo Dresden won the championship, the club's seventh out of eight East German championships.

Torsten Gütschow of Dynamo Dresden was the league's top scorer with 17 goals, while Andreas Trautmann of Dynamo Dresden took out the seasons East German Footballer of the year award.

On the strength of the 1988–89 title Dynamo Dresden qualified for the 1989–90 European Cup where the club was knocked out by AEK Athens in the first round. Second-placed club BFC Dynamo qualified for the 1989–90 European Cup Winners' Cup as the seasons FDGB-Pokal winners and was knocked out by AS Monaco in the second round. Third-placed FC Karl-Marx-Stadt qualified for the 1989–90 UEFA Cup where it was knocked out by Juventus in the third round while fourth-placed F.C. Hansa Rostock lost to FC Baník Ostrava in the first round.

== Table ==
The 1988–89 season saw two newly promoted clubs, BSG Energie Cottbus and BSG Sachsenring Zwickau.

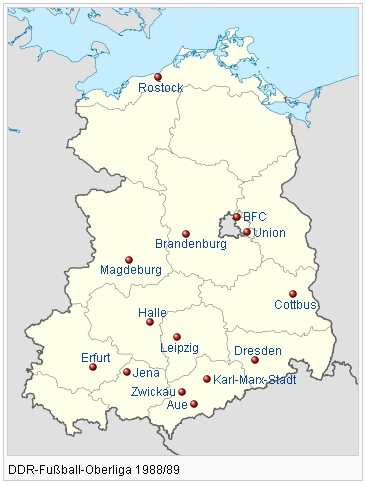

Pos	Team	Pld	W	D	L	GF	GA	GD	Pts	Qualification or relegation
1	SG Dynamo Dresden (C)	26	16	8	2	61	26	+35	40	Qualification to European Cup first round
2	Berliner FC Dynamo	26	12	8	6	51	32	+19	32	Qualification to Cup Winners' Cup first round
3	FC Karl-Marx-Stadt	26	12	6	8	38	36	+2	30	Qualified for the UEFA Cup first round
4	F.C. Hansa Rostock	26	12	5	9	34	31	+3	29	Qualified for the UEFA Cup first round
5	1. FC Lokomotive Leipzig	26	11	6	9	39	26	+13	28	
6	1. FC Magdeburg	26	11	6	9	35	30	+5	28	
7	BSG Wismut Aue	26	10	8	8	35	35	0	28	
8	FC Carl Zeiss Jena	26	11	5	10	35	24	+11	27	
9	Hallescher FC Chemie	26	8	9	9	36	38	−2	25	
10	BSG Energie Cottbus	26	9	5	12	29	41	−12	23	
11	BSG Stahl Brandenburg	26	9	4	13	36	43	−7	22	
12	FC Rot-Weiss Erfurt	26	9	3	14	27	39	−12	21	
13	BSG Sachsenring Zwickau (R)	26	6	4	16	25	49	−24	16	Relegation to DDR-Liga
14	1. FC Union Berlin (R)	26	5	5	16	22	53	−31	15	Relegation to DDR-Liga

(C) Champions; (R) Relegated

== Results ==
Home \ Away	BFC	CZJ	DRE	ECO	HFC	HRO	KMS	LOK	MAG	RWE	SZW	STB	UNI	AUE
BFC Dynamo		1–1	1–1	1–1	2–2	4–0	5–1	0–2	1–1	1–2	1–0	2–0	1–1	2–1
Carl Zeiss Jena	0–1		3–4	2–0	0–0	2–0	2–1	0–1	3–0	3–0	2–0	2–0	5–1	2–0
Dynamo Dresden	2–1	1–1		5–1	1–1	5–0	3–4	3–0	0–0	2–0	4–1	3–1	5–0	2–0
Energie Cottbus	0–2	2–1	0–1		0–0	2–2	3–1	2–1	3–1	1–0	0–0	3–0	2–1	1–0
Hallescher FC Chemie	1–4	2–0	1–3	0–1		1–3	1–1	1–0	0–2	3–0	4–1	1–1	3–0	1–1
Hansa Rostock	1–0	2–0	2–2	3–0	3–0		1–1	1–0	3–0	2–0	1–1	1–0	5–0	1–2
Karl-Marx-Stadt	2–1	1–1	2–1	2–2	5–3	1–0		1–3	1–0	1–0	1–0	2–2	0–0	4–2
Lokomotive Leipzig	4–2	2–1	1–2	2–0	0–0	0–1	1–0		2–2	2–0	7–2	0–0	0–1	1–1
1. FC Magdeburg	2–2	0–2	0–2	2–1	2–0	1–0	0–1	1–0		1–0	3–0	5–0	3–1	2–2
Rot-Weiß Erfurt	2–6	1–0	2–2	3–1	3–5	0–1	0–2	2–1	1–1		3–1	3–0	2–0	2–0
Sachsenring Zwickau	0–3	0–1	0–1	3–1	1–3	3–0	2–1	0–0	1–0	0–1		2–1	5–1	1–2
Stahl Brandenburg	1–2	1–0	2–2	4–0	3–1	3–0	2–1	1–3	1–2	2–0	5–0		2–1	1–4
Union Berlin	2–3	1–1	1–3	1–0	1–2	1–1	0–1	1–1	2–4	1–0	2–0	1–0		1–2
Wismut Aue	2–2	2–0	1–1	3–2	0–0	2–0	1–0	1–5	1–0	0–0	1–1	2–3	2–0	

Legend: Blue = home team win; Yellow = draw; Red = away team win.

== Attendances ==
No.	Club	Average
1	Dynamo Dresden	22,215
2	Hansa Rostock	20,308
3	Energie Cottbus	13,088
4	Wismut Aue	10,646
5	Hallescher	10,568
6	Stahl Brandenburg	9,346
7	Karl-Marx-Stadt	8,950
8	BFC Dynamo	8,385
9	Erfurt	8,038
10	1. FC Union	7,308
11	Magdeburg	6,615
12	Lokomotive Leipzig	6,546
13	Sachsenring Zwickau	6,085
14	Carl Zeiss Jena	4,862
