= 1994–95 Dynamo Dresden season =

Dynamo Dresden
1994–95 season
- Manager: Sigfried Held (to 22 November); Horst Hrubesch (22 November – 2 March); Ralf Minge (from 2 March)
- Bundesliga: 18th (relegated)
- DFB-Pokal: Third round
- Top goalscorer: League: Johnny Ekström (7); All: Johnny Ekström; Michael Spies (7)

The 1994–95 season was Dynamo Dresden's fourth, and to date last, season in the Bundesliga. It was a fairly disastrous season for the club – they finished at the bottom of the table, winning only four league games, including a 21-game winless streak, from October to May. The club got through three managers: Sigfried Held was replaced by another former Germany international striker, Horst Hrubesch, who lasted only four months, before former Dynamo forward Ralf Minge took over for the remainder of the season.

The squad had seen some turnover in pre-season, with last season's top scorer Olaf Marschall leaving for 1. FC Kaiserslautern and midfield pairing Piotr Nowak and Miroslav Stevic joining 1860 Munich. In mid-season, Dynamo turned to two veteran Bundesliga strikers, Jørn Andersen and Herbert Waas, but neither was able to make an impact – neither player scored for the club. One highlight was the emergence of future Germany international Jens Jeremies, who played in the last ten games of the season, while Australian goalkeeper Mark Schwarzer made his first appearances in European football, as understudy to Stanislav Cherchesov.

Having been relegated to the 2. Bundesliga at the end of the season, Dynamo were dropped down another level, to the third-tier Regionalliga Nordost, due to financial irregularities.

== Squad ==
Note: Flags indicate national team as defined under FIFA eligibility rules; some limited exceptions apply. Players may hold more than one non-FIFA nationality.

No.	Pos.	Nation	Player
—	GK	RUS	Stanislav Cherchesov
—	GK	AUS	Mark Schwarzer
—	DF	GER	René Beuchel
—	DF	GER	René Groth
—	DF	GER	Thomas Hoßmang
—	DF	GER	Mario Kern
—	DF	POL	Andrzej Lesiak
—	DF	GER	Matthias Maucksch
—	DF	GER	Dirk Oberritter
—	DF	GER	Hans-Uwe Pilz
—	DF	DEN	Henrik Risom
—	DF	GER	Detlef Schößler
—	MF	GER	Uwe Jähnig
—	MF	GER	Jens Jeremies
—	MF	GER	Sven Kmetsch

No.	Pos.	Nation	Player
—	MF	GER	Markus Kranz
—	MF	CRO	Nikica Maglica
—	MF	GER	Thomas Rath
—	MF	GER	Sven Ratke
—	MF	GER	Andreas Sassen (from November)
—	MF	GER	Michael Spies
—	MF	GER	Matthias Stammann
—	FW	NOR	Jørn Andersen (from January)
—	FW	GER	Marco Dittgen
—	FW	SWE	Johnny Ekström
—	FW	GER	Henri Fuchs
—	FW	GER	Sascha Licht
—	FW	GER	Werner Rank
—	FW	GER	Herbert Waas (from January)
—	FW	GER	Florian Weichert

== Results ==
=== Bundesliga ===
20 August 1994	Dynamo Dresden	1–1	Werder Bremen	Dresden
15:30	Ekström 3'	Report	Bode 35'	Stadium: Rudolf-Harbig-Stadion; Attendance: 22,000; Referee: Jürgen Aust (Cologne)

23 August 1994	VfL Bochum	2–0	Dynamo Dresden	Bochum
20:00	Aden 32'; Von Ahlen 75'	Report		Stadium: Ruhrstadion; Attendance: 20,200; Referee: Lutz Wagner (Kriftel)

26 August 1994	Dynamo Dresden	1–3	SC Freiburg	Dresden
15:30	Dittgen 47'	Report	Müller 13'; Spies 64'; Rodolfo Esteban Cardoso 81'	Stadium: Rudolf-Harbig-Stadion; Attendance: 16,500; Referee: Heinz-Dieter Casper (Dortmund)

2 September 1994	Borussia Mönchengladbach	2–0	Dynamo Dresden	Mönchengladbach
20:00	Dahlin 46'; Effenberg 89'	Report		Stadium: Bökelbergstadion; Attendance: 25,000; Referee: Lutz Pohlmann (Felde)

17 September 1994	Dynamo Dresden	4–2	MSV Duisburg	Dresden
15:30	Kern 45'; Fuchs 60', 73'; Spies 62'	Report	Böger 35'; Osthoff 83'	Stadium: Rudolf-Harbig-Stadion; Attendance: 11,800; Referee: Hans-Peter Best (Kämpfelbach)

24 September 1994	Hamburger SV	2–1	Dynamo Dresden	Hamburg
15:30	Albertz 51'; Bäron 88'	Report	Dittgen 54'	Stadium: Volksparkstadion; Attendance: 23,266; Referee: Georg Dardenne (Nettersheim)

30 September 1994	Dynamo Dresden	1–1	1860 Munich	Dresden
20:00	Seeliger 13' (o.g.)	Report	Pacult 68' (pen.)	Stadium: Rudolf-Harbig-Stadion; Attendance: 20,200; Referee: Hans-Joachim Osmers (Bremen)

8 October 1994	1. FC Köln	1–2	Dynamo Dresden	Köln
15:30	Polster 83'	Report	Spies 19'; Ekström 57'	Stadium: Müngersdorfer Stadion; Attendance: 23,000; Referee: Eugen Strigel (Horb)

15 October 1994	Dynamo Dresden	1–0	1. FC Kaiserslautern	Dresden
15:30	Ekström 18'	Report		Stadium: Rudolf-Harbig-Stadion; Attendance: 20,750; Referee: Hans Scheuerer (Munich)

22 October 1994	Eintracht Frankfurt	2–0	Dynamo Dresden	Frankfurt
15:30	Furtok 46'; Yeboah 54'	Report		Stadium: Waldstadion; Attendance: 22,800; Referee: Jürgen Jansen (Essen)

29 October 1994	Dynamo Dresden	0–1	Borussia Dortmund	Dresden
15:30		Report	Möller 34'	Stadium: Rudolf-Harbig-Stadion; Attendance: 29,100; Referee: Wolf-Günter Wiesel (Ottbergen)

4 November 1994	VfB Stuttgart	4–2	Dynamo Dresden	Stuttgart
20:00	Buck 35'; Kruse 62'; Kögl 81' (pen.); Poschner 85'	Report	Fuchs 43'; Spies 60'	Stadium: Gottlieb-Daimler-Stadion; Attendance: 22,000; Referee: Hellmut Krug (Gelsenkirchen)

12 November 1994	Dynamo Dresden	1–2	Bayer Uerdingen	Dresden
15:30	Rath 40'	Report	Bittengel 26'; Lässig 51'	Stadium: Rudolf-Harbig-Stadion; Attendance: 13,500; Referee: Hermann Albrecht (Kaufbeuren)

18 November 1994	Schalke 04	4–0	Dynamo Dresden	Gelsenkirchen
20:00	Mulder 21'; Latal 30', 46'; Büskens 52'	Report		Stadium: Parkstadion; Attendance: 23,900; Referee: Winfried Buchhart (Schrobenhausen)

26 November 1994	Dynamo Dresden	1–1	Karlsruher SC	Dresden
15:30	Ekström 68'	Report	Schmitt 74'	Stadium: Rudolf-Harbig-Stadion; Attendance: 11,400; Referee: Markus Merk (Otterbach)

3 December 1994	Bayern Munich	2–1	Dynamo Dresden	Munich
15:30	Ziege 57', 59'	Report	Lesiak 86'	Stadium: Olympiastadion; Attendance: 33,000; Referee: Rainer Werthmann (Bochum)

10 December 1994	Dynamo Dresden	1–1	Bayer Leverkusen	Dresden
15:30	Ekström 68'	Report	Völler 78'	Stadium: Rudolf-Harbig-Stadion; Attendance: 14,800; Referee: Eugen Strigel (Horb)

18 February 1995	Werder Bremen	1–0	Dynamo Dresden	Bremen
15:30	Herzog 44' (pen.)	Report		Stadium: Weserstadion; Attendance: 23,900; Referee: Markus Weber (Bergkamen)

24 February 1995	Dynamo Dresden	0–2	VfL Bochum	Dresden
20:00		Report	Baluszynski 19'; Peschel 87'	Stadium: Rudolf-Harbig-Stadion; Attendance: 19,000; Referee: Bernhard Zerr (Ottersweier)

4 March 1995	SC Freiburg	3–1	Dynamo Dresden	Freiburg
15:30	Heinrich 43'; Zeyer 45'; Cardoso 80'	Report	Rath 37'	Stadium: Dreisamstadion; Attendance: 18,000; Referee: Georg Dardenne (Nettersheim)

11 March 1995	Dynamo Dresden	0–3	Borussia Mönchengladbach	Dresden
15:30		Report	Neun 16'; Effenberg 52'; Wynhoff 89'	Stadium: Rudolf-Harbig-Stadion; Attendance: 19,100; Referee: Hans-Peter Best (Kämpfelbach)

19 March 1995	MSV Duisburg	1–1	Dynamo Dresden	Duisburg
15:30	Weidemann 44'	Report	Lesiak 55'	Stadium: Wedaustadion; Attendance: 20,000; Referee: Alfons Berg (Konz)

25 March 1995	Dynamo Dresden	1–1	Hamburger SV	Dresden
15:30	Ordenewitz 80' (o.g.)	Report	Albertz 56'	Stadium: Rudolf-Harbig-Stadion; Attendance: 12,100; Referee: Rainer Werthmann (Bochum)

1 April 1995	1860 Munich	3–1	Dynamo Dresden	Munich
15:30	Erhard 26'; Winkler 48', 71'	Report	Spies 50'	Stadium: Olympiastadion; Attendance: 20,000; Referee: Hartmut Strampe (Handorf)

8 April 1995	Dynamo Dresden	1–3	1. FC Köln	Dresden
15:30	Jähnig 15'	Report	Labbadia 65'; Greiner 70'; Polster 90'	Stadium: Rudolf-Harbig-Stadion; Attendance: 12,500; Referee: Lutz Wagner (Kriftel)

15 April 1995	1. FC Kaiserslautern	3–1	Dynamo Dresden	Kaiserslautern
15:30	Kuntz 25', 86'; Brehme 80' (pen.)	Report	Ekström 62'	Stadium: Betzenbergstadion; Attendance: 36,975; Referee: Jürgen Jansen (Essen)

22 April 1995	Dynamo Dresden	1–2	Eintracht Frankfurt	Dresden
15:30	Dittgen 37'	Report	Binz 79'; Anicic 86'	Stadium: Rudolf-Harbig-Stadion; Attendance: 12,200; Referee: Markus Weber (Bergkamen)

29 April 1995	Borussia Dortmund	2–0	Dynamo Dresden	Dortmund
15:30	Tretschok 72', 90'	Report		Stadium: Westfalenstadion; Attendance: 42,800; Referee: Hans-Jürgen Kasper (Katlenburg)

6 May 1995	Dynamo Dresden	1–1	VfB Stuttgart	Dresden
15:30	Jeremies 50'	Report	Berthold 88'	Stadium: Rudolf-Harbig-Stadion; Attendance: 9,000; Referee: Georg Dardenne (Nettersheim)

12 May 1995	Bayer Uerdingen	3–1	Dynamo Dresden	Krefeld
20:00	Feldhoff 33'; Bittengel 66'; Paßlack 87'	Report	Beuchel 20'	Stadium: Grotenburg-Stadion; Attendance: 9,184; Referee: Bernhard Zerr (Ottersweier)

20 May 1995	Dynamo Dresden	2–1	Schalke 04	Dresden
15:30	Rath 45'; Schößler 54' (pen.)	Report	Herzog 75'	Stadium: Rudolf-Harbig-Stadion; Attendance: 10,500; Referee: Manfred Schmidt

27 May 1995	Karlsruher SC	5–3	Dynamo Dresden	Karlsruhe
15:30	Maucksch 21' (o.g.); Schmitt 25', 53'; Knup 83', 86'	Report	Ekström 13'; Spies 19'; Weichert 90'	Stadium: Wildparkstadion; Attendance: 22,000; Referee: Hellmut Krug (Gelsenkirchen)

10 June 1995	Bayern Munich	1–0	Dynamo Dresden	Munich
15:30	Witeczek 88'	Report		Stadium: Olympiastadion; Attendance: 20,253; Referee: Frank Kiefer (Baunatal)

17 June 1995	Bayer Leverkusen	2–2	Dynamo Dresden	Leverkusen
15:30	Hapal 6'; Kirsten 78'	Report	Fuchs 52'; Spies 90'	Stadium: Ulrich-Haberland-Stadion; Attendance: 16,800; Referee: Winfried Buchhart (Schrobenhausen)

=== DFB-Pokal ===
13 August 1994 Round 1	SV Meppen	0–1	Dynamo Dresden	Meppen
19:00		Report	Rank 60'	Stadium: Emslandstadion; Attendance: 6,500; Referee: Hans-Dieter Casper (Dortmund)

10 September 1994 Round 2	Dynamo Dresden	1–0	Bayer Uerdingen	Dresden
15:30	Spies 44'	Report		Stadium: Rudolf-Harbig-Stadion; Attendance: 9,000; Referee: Günther Habermann (Weißensee)

25 October 1994 Round 3	1. FC Köln	2–1	Dynamo Dresden	Cologne
	Labbadia 5', 39'	Report	Maucksch 36'	Attendance: 15,000; Referee: Hans-Joachim Osmers (Bremen)

== Transfers ==
=== In ===
Player	From	Date
(Germany) Marco Dittgen	1. FC Kaiserslautern	Summer
(Sweden) Johnny Ekström	Real Betis	Summer
(Germany) Thomas Hoßmang	Rot-Weiss Frankfurt	Summer
(Germany) Jens Jeremies	Dynamo Dresden (A)	Summer
(Poland) Andrzej Lesiak	FC Tirol	Summer
(Germany) Sascha Licht	1. FC Nürnberg	Summer
(Australia) Mark Schwarzer	Marconi Stallions	Summer
(Germany) Michael Spies	Hamburger SV	Summer
(Germany) Matthias Stammann	Bayer Leverkusen	Summer
(Germany) Florian Weichert	Hamburger SV	Summer
(Germany) Andreas Sassen	Hamburger SV	November
(Norway) Jørn Andersen	Hamburger SV	January
(Germany) Herbert Waas	FC Zürich	January

=== Out ===
Player	To	Date
(Germany) Olaf Marschall	1. FC Kaiserslautern	Summer
(Germany) René Müller	FC St. Pauli	Summer
(Poland) Piotr Nowak	1860 Munich	Summer
(Slovakia) Marek Penksa	Eintracht Frankfurt (loan return)	Summer
(Germany) Frank Schulze	Retired	Summer
(Germany) Nils Schmäler	VfR Heilbronn	Summer
(Federal Republic of Yugoslavia) Miroslav Stevic	1860 Munich	Summer
