= 1999–2000 DFB-Pokal =

Tournament details
- Country: Germany
- Teams: 64

Final positions
- Champions: Bayern Munich
- Runners-up: Werder Bremen

Tournament statistics
- Matches played: 72
- Top goal scorer: Adnan Kevrić (8)

The 1999–2000 DFB-Pokal was the 57th season of the annual German football cup competition. It began on 31 July 1999 and ended on 6 May 2000. In the final Bayern Munich defeated Werder Bremen 3–0 to take their tenth title.

== Matches ==
Times up to 30 October 1999 and from 26 March 2000 are CEST (UTC+2). Times from 31 October 1999 to 25 March 2000 are CET (UTC+1).

=== First round ===
31 July 1999	SC Verl	0–0 (a.e.t.) (6–5 p)	Borussia Mönchengladbach	Verl
		Report (in German)		Attendance: 5,000; Referee: Michael Weiner (Giesen)
	Penalties
	Milde (penalty scored); Plaßhenrich (penalty scored); Schriewersmann (penalty scored); Mrugalla (penalty scored); Schmidt (penalty scored); Friedrich (penalty scored)		Van Lent (penalty scored); Nielsen (penalty scored); Frontzeck (penalty scored); Eberl (penalty scored); Sopić (penalty scored); Reiter (penalty missed)

31 July 1999	Darmstadt 98	2–4	Chemnitzer FC	Darmstadt
	Bury 63', 90'	Report (in German)	Kunze 5', 18'; Mehlhorn 54'; Dittgen 70'	Stadium: Stadion am Böllenfalltor; Attendance: 5,500; Referee: Knut Kircher (Rottenburg)

31 July 1999	Carl Zeiss Jena	1–2	SpVgg Greuther Fürth	Jena
	Hempel 78'	Report (in German)	Ruman 1'; Lamptey 71'	Stadium: Ernst-Abbe-Sportfeld; Attendance: 2,600; Referee: Lange (Herrenberg)

31 July 1999	VFC Plauen	1–0	Alemannia Aachen	Plauen
	Weiß 20'	Report (in German)		Stadium: Vogtlandstadion; Attendance: 3,800; Referee: Sippel (Würzburg)

31 July 1999	VfL Osnabrück	0–1	Energie Cottbus	Osnabrück
		Report (in German)	Wawrzyczek 89'	Stadium: Stadion an der Bremer Brücke; Attendance: 3,500; Referee: Dirk Margenberg (Wermelskirchen)

31 July 1999	VfL Hamm/Sieg	0–4	Stuttgarter Kickers	Hamm
		Report (in German)	Marić 17', 66'; Kevrić 45', 76'	Attendance: 700; Referee: Christian Schößling (Leipzig)

31 July 1999	Singen 04	3–2	Rot-Weiss Oberhausen	Singen
	Rus 57' (o.g.); Brugger 62'; Stephen 68'	Report (in German)	Pröpper 33'; Lipinski 57'	Attendance: 2,500; Referee: Manfred Haupt (Mainz)

1 August 1999	Fortuna Düsseldorf	2–0	1. FC Nürnberg	Düsseldorf
	Putilo 31'; Shittu 67'	Report (in German)		Stadium: Rheinstadion; Attendance: 6,500; Referee: Michael Wendorf (Glienicke)

1 August 1999	Wuppertaler SV	1–2	Kickers Offenbach	Wuppertal
	Refos 77'	Report (in German)	Dama 13'; Becker 26'	Stadium: Stadion am Zoo; Attendance: 3,800; Referee: Ralf Hilmes (Nordhorn)

=== Second round ===
6 August 1999	VfL Halle 96	1–2	Mainz 05	Halle
	Gumprecht 60'	Report (in German)	Machado 13'; Kolvidsson 34'	Attendance: 2,100; Referee: Burkhard Hufgard (Mömbris)

6 August 1999	1. SC Norderstedt	0–3	VfB Stuttgart	Norderstedt
		Report (in German)	Ristić 32'; Peters 41' (o.g.); Lisztes 52'	Attendance: 4,200; Referee: Jürgen Aust (Cologne)

6 August 1999	SSV Reutlingen	2–3	VfL Bochum	Reutlingen
	Marić 11'; Djappa 36'	Report (in German)	Baştürk 9'; Buckley 20'; Bałuszyński 55'	Stadium: Stadion an der Kreuzeiche; Attendance: 3,600; Referee: Alfons Berg (Konz)

6 August 1999	Eintracht Trier	1–1 (a.e.t.) (5–4 p)	Karlsruher SC	Trier
	Milosević 89' (pen.)	Report (in German)	Kritzer 59'	Stadium: Moselstadion; Attendance: 3,900; Referee: Florian Meyer (Burgdorf)
	Penalties
	Teichmann (penalty scored); Papić (penalty missed); Racanel (penalty missed); Breu (penalty scored); Milosević (penalty scored); Heinzen (penalty scored); Hörster (penalty scored)		Braun (penalty scored); Arnold (penalty scored); Molata (penalty scored); Fährmann (penalty missed); Lakies (penalty missed); Bäumer (penalty scored); Schütterle (penalty missed)

6 August 1999	KFC Uerdingen	0–4	Tennis Borussia Berlin	Krefeld
		Report (in German)	Rösler 18' (pen.), 74'; Ćirić 57', 81'	Stadium: Grotenburg-Stadion; Attendance: 2,000; Referee: Peter Gagelmann (Bremen)

6 August 1999	FC Gütersloh	0–1	Energie Cottbus	Gütersloh
		Report (in German)	Helbig 89'	Stadium: Heidewaldstadion; Attendance: 2,000; Referee: Lutz Wagner (Kriftel)

7 August 1999	SV Babelsberg 03	1–0	SpVgg Unterhaching	Potsdam
	Lau 90'	Report (in German)		Stadium: Karl-Liebknecht-Stadion; Attendance: 3,000; Referee: Thomas Frank (Hannover)

7 August 1999	FK Pirmasens	0–3	1860 Munich	Pirmasens
		Report (in German)	Max 8'; Schroth 28'; Paßlack 50'	Stadium: Sportpark Husterhöhe; Attendance: 10,000; Referee: Rainer Werthmann (Bochum)

7 August 1999	1. FC Pforzheim	0–2	SC Freiburg	Pforzheim
		Report (in German)	Baya 17'; Ben Slimane 60'	Attendance: 6,000; Referee: Jörg Keßler (Höhenkirchen)

7 August 1999	BFC Dynamo	0–2	Arminia Bielefeld	Friedrich-Ludwig-Jahn-Sportpark, Berlin
		Report (in German)	Meißner 21', 79'	Attendance: 2,399; Referee: Uwe Kemmling (Kleinburgwedel)

7 August 1999	Werder Bremen (A)	3–1	Fortuna Köln	Bremen
	Wojcik 4'; Harttgen 29'; Zimin 70'	Report (in German)	Zernicke 71'	Stadium: Weserstadion, Platz 11; Attendance: 500; Referee: Olaf Blumenstein (Berlin)

7 August 1999	SG Wattenscheid 09	1–7	1. FC Köln	Wattenscheid
	Ebbers 45'	Report (in German)	Timm 6', 14', 26', 83'; Ojigwe 33'; Cullmann 67'; Dziwior 78'	Stadium: Lohrheidestadion; Attendance: 4,000; Referee: Franz-Xaver Wack (Biberbach)

7 August 1999	SV Meppen	2–1	Kickers Offenbach	Meppen
	Capin 61'; Deters 90'	Report (in German)	Sohler 79'	Stadium: Emslandstation; Attendance: 2,800; Referee: Jürgen Jansen (Essen)

7 August 1999	VFC Plauen	1–2	Stuttgarter Kickers	Plauen
	Krasselt 17'	Report (in German)	Kevrić 11' (pen.), 18'	Stadium: Vogtlandstadion; Attendance: 3,100; Referee: Detlef Scheppe (Wenden)

7 August 1999	TuS Langerwehe	0–6	Chemnitzer FC	Langerwehe
		Report (in German)	Dittgen 14', 50', 74'; Wienhold 28'; Jendrossek 53'; Kujat 763'	Attendance: 1,000; Referee: Volker Wezel (Tübingen)

7 August 1999	FC Singen 04	1–3	SpVgg Greuther Fürth	Singen
	Bülent 66'	Report (in German)	Yonkov 23'; Ruman 78', 85'	Attendance: 3,400; Referee: Jürgen Kreyer (Hilden)

7 August 1999	FC Schönberg 95	0–3	SV Waldhof Mannheim	Schönberg
		Report (in German)	Vincze 30', 40'; Ernst 47'	Attendance: 1,000; Referee: Matthias Anklam (Buchholz in der Nordheide)

7 August 1999	SpVgg Landshut	0–2	Hansa Rostock	Landshut
		Report (in German)	Agali 28'; Yasser 49'	Attendance: 4,500; Referee: Thorsten Kinhöfer (Herne)

8 August 1999	Fortuna Düsseldorf	0–2	SSV Ulm 1846	Düsseldorf
		Report (in German)	Bodog 43'; Van de Haar 50'	Stadium: Rheinstadion; Attendance: 7,500; Referee: Bernd Hauer (Celle)

8 August 1999	SC Verl	0–4	Eintracht Frankfurt	Verl
		Report (in German)	Kracht 22'; Weber 57' (pen.); Fjørtoft 88', 90'	Stadium: Stadion an der Poststraße; Attendance: 5,000; Referee: Torsten Koop (Lüttenmark)

8 August 1999	1860 Rosenheim	1–2	FC St. Pauli	Rosenheim
	Parstorfer 31'	Report (in German)	Marin 21'; Klasnić 24'	Attendance: 4,000; Referee: Stefan Weber (Emmerich)

8 August 1999	VfB Lübeck	0–1	Hannover 96	Lübeck
		Report (in German)	Milovanović 24'	Stadium: Lohmühle; Attendance: 5,900; Referee: Bernhard Zerr (Ottersweier)

9 August 1999	1. FC Saarbrücken	0–1	Schalke 04	Saarbrücken
		Report (in German)	Sand 21'	Stadium: Ludwigsparkstadion; Attendance: 15,000; Referee: Günter Perl (Munich)

=== Third round ===
12 October 1999	SV Babelsberg 03	2–4 (a.e.t.)	SC Freiburg	Potsdam
	Civa 39' (pen.); Krnarić 116'	Report (in German)	Iashvili 49'; Weißhaupt 97', 120'; Kobiashvili 110'	Stadium: Karl-Liebknecht-Stadion; Attendance: 2,800; Referee: Stefan Trautmann (Bodenwerder)

12 October 1999	Waldhof Mannheim	3–2 (a.e.t.)	Bayer Leverkusen	Mannheim
	Schwinkendorf 26'; Licht 83'; Klausz 105'	Report (in German)	Ponte 10'; Beinlich 78'	Attendance: 15,000; Referee: Edgar Steinborn (Sinzig)

12 October 1999	Hannover 96	1–2	Arminia Bielefeld	Hannover
	Waterink 33' (o.g.)	Report (in German)	Meißner 16'; Van der Ven 45'	Stadium: Niedersachsenstadion; Attendance: 19,300; Referee: Winfried Buchhart (Schrobenhausen)

12 October 1999	FC St. Pauli	0–2	SSV Ulm 1846	Hamburg
		Report (in German)	Trkulja 42' (pen.); Van de Haar 48'	Stadium: Stadion am Millerntor; Attendance: 19,100; Referee: Bernhard Zerr (Ottersweier)

12 October 1999	SpVgg Greuther Fürth	1–3	Hansa Rostock	Fürth
	Felgenhauer 53'	Report (in German)	Brand 10'; Baumgart 27'; Skarabela 90' (o.g.)	Stadium: Playmobil-Stadion; Attendance: 8,300; Referee: Florian Meyer (Burgdorf)

12 October 1999	Stuttgarter Kickers	3–1	Borussia Dortmund	Stuttgart
	Kevrić 10', 48'; Wörns 45' (o.g.)	Report (in German)	Cássio 16' (o.g.)	Stadium: Kickers-Stadion; Attendance: 10,600; Referee: Alfons Berg (Konz)

12 October 1999	Werder Bremen	2–2 (a.e.t.) (4–3 p)	1. FC Kaiserslautern	Bremen
	Aílton 85'; Bode 103'	Report (in German)	Wagner 69', 100'	Stadium: Weserstadion; Attendance: 15,700; Referee: Helmut Fleischer (Ulm)
	Penalties
	Aílton (penalty scored); Pizarro (penalty scored); Wicky (penalty missed); Frings (penalty scored); Herzog (penalty missed); Rost (penalty scored)		Schjønberg (penalty missed); Djorkaeff (penalty scored); Sobotzik (penalty scored); Wagner (penalty missed); Marschall (penalty scored); Strasser (penalty missed)

12 October 1999	1. FC Köln	2–1	Eintracht Frankfurt	Cologne
	Donkov 44'; Lottner 45'	Report (in German)	Gebhardt 47'	Stadium: Müngersdorfer Stadion; Attendance: 32,000; Referee: Hermann Albrecht (Kaufbeuren)

13 October 1999	Werder Bremen (A)	0–1	VfB Stuttgart	Bremen
		Report (in German)	Hosny 36'	Stadium: Weserstadion, Platz 11; Attendance: 1,600; Referee: Torsten Loop (Lüttenmark)

13 October 1999	Chemnitzer FC	2–3	VfL Wolfsburg	Chemnitz
	Mehlhorn 24' (pen.); Skela 86'	Report (in German)	Nowak 38'; Laudeley 45' (o.g.); Juskowiak 57'	Stadium: Stadion an der Gellertstraße; Attendance: 5,000; Referee: Jürgen Aust (Cologne)

13 October 1999	VfL Bochum	1–1 (a.e.t.) (6–5 p)	MSV Duisburg	Bochum
	Baştürk 70'	Report (in German)	Spies 86'	Stadium: Ruhrstadion; Attendance: 12,900; Referee: Stark (Landshut)
	Penalties
	Reis (penalty scored); Rietpietsch (penalty scored); Stickroth (penalty scored); Lust (penalty scored); Weber (penalty missed); Buckley (penalty scored); Dickhaut (penalty scored)		Hirsch (penalty scored); Beierle (penalty scored); Zeyer (penalty scored); Hajto (penalty missed); Voss (penalty scored); Neun (penalty scored); Wolters (penalty missed)

13 October 1999	Energie Cottbus	2–2 (a.e.t.) (5–4 p)	Schalke 04	Cottbus
	Latoundji 18'; Wawrzyczek 117'	Report (in German)	Asamoah 9'; Sand 107'	Stadium: Stadion der Freundschaft; Attendance: 18,700; Referee: Uwe Kemmling (Kleinburgwedel)
	Penalties
	Jesse (penalty scored); Miriuță (penalty scored); Heidrich (penalty scored); Beeck (penalty scored); Wawrzyczek (penalty scored)		Thon (penalty scored); Wilmots (penalty scored); Van Kerckoven (penalty missed); Kmetsch (penalty scored); Alpuğan (penalty scored)

13 October 1999	SV Meppen	1–4	Bayern Munich	Meppen
	Capin 61'	Report (in German)	Jancker 1'; Zickler 57', 68'; Giovane Élber 82'	Stadium: Emslandstadion; Attendance: 16,500; Referee: Herbert Fandel (Kyllburg)

13 October 1999	Mainz 05	2–0	Hamburger SV	Mainz
	Policella 44'; Ratkowski 77'	Report (in German)		Stadium: Stadion am Bruchweg; Attendance: 11,800; Referee: Jörg Keßler (Höhenkirchen)

13 October 1999	Eintracht Trier	2–1	1860 Munich	Trier
	Thömmes 2', 57'	Report (in German)	Max 33'	Stadium: Moselstadion; Attendance: 13,000; Referee: Jürgen Jansen (Essen)

13 October 1999	Tennis Borussia Berlin	2–3 (a.e.t.)	Hertha BSC	Berlin
	Rösler 4'; Walker 68'	Report (in German)	Sanneh 35'; Dardai 56'; Aračić 94'	Stadium: Olympiastadion; Attendance: 23,300; Referee: Hartmut Strampe (Handorf)

=== Round of 16 ===
30 November 1999	Eintracht Trier	0–4	Hansa Rostock	Trier
		Report (in German)	Arvidsson 63'; Brand 66'; Breitkreutz 80'; Baumgart 82'	Stadium: Moselstadion; Attendance: 13,000; Referee: Hermann Albrecht (Kaufbeuren)

30 November 1999	SC Freiburg	2–0	Energie Cottbus	Freiburg
	Sellimi 45'; Bruns 49'	Report (in German)		Stadium: Dreisamstadion; Attendance: 10,000; Referee: Winfried Buchhart (Schrobenhausen)

30 November 1999	Mainz 05	2–1 (a.e.t.)	Hertha BSC	Mainz
	Thurk 82'; Machado 98'	Report (in German)	Preetz 67'	Stadium: Stadion am Bruchweg; Attendance: 14,900; Referee: Helmut Fleischer (Ulm)

30 November 1999	VfB Stuttgart	4–0	1. FC Köln	Stuttgart
	Ganea 37', 63'; Pinto 52'; Hosny 90'	Report (in German)		Stadium: Gottlieb-Daimler-Stadion; Attendance: 15,000; Referee: Franz-Xaver Wack (Biberbach)

1 December 1999	Waldhof Mannheim	0–3	Bayern Munich	Mannheim
		Report (in German)	Jeremies 36'; Zickler 80'; Salihamidžić 84'	Stadium: Carl-Benz-Stadion; Attendance: 27,000; Referee: Jürgen Aust (Cologne)

1 December 1999	Werder Bremen	2–1	SSV Ulm 1846	Bremen
	Pizarro 21', 88'	Report (in German)	Leandro 33'	Stadium: Weserstadion; Attendance: 8,000; Referee: Heinemann (Magdeburg)

1 December 1999	Stuttgarter Kickers	3–2 (a.e.t.)	Arminia Bielefeld	Stuttgart
	Marić 55'; Kevrić 71', 110'	Report (in German)	Wichniarek 75'; Özkan 79' (o.g.)	Attendance: 4,600; Referee: Lutz Michael Fröhlich (Berlin)

1 December 1999	VfL Bochum	5–4	VfL Wolfsburg	Bochum
	Weber 41', 43'; Peschel 47' (pen.); Baştürk 58', 90'	Report (in German)	Feldhoff 28'; Thomsen 40'; Akonnor 55', 84' (pen.)	Stadium: Ruhrstadion; Attendance: 10,900; Referee: Lutz Wagner (Kriftel)

=== Quarter-finals ===
21 December 1999	VfL Bochum	1–2	Werder Bremen	Bochum
	Weber 63'	Report (in German)	Aílton 79', 87'	Stadium: Ruhrstadion; Attendance: 20,000; Referee: Markus Merk (Otterbach)

21 December 1999	Stuttgarter Kickers	1–0	SC Freiburg	Stuttgart
	Marić 39'	Report (in German)		Attendance: 10,000; Referee: Heinemann (Magdeburg)

22 December 1999	Bayern Munich	3–0	Mainz 05	Munich
	Herzberger 18' (o.g.); Jancker 63'; Santa Cruz 70'	Report (in German)		Stadium: Olympiastadion; Attendance: 11,200; Referee: Hartmut Strampe (Handorf)

22 December 1999	Hansa Rostock	2–1	VfB Stuttgart	Rostock
	Arvidsson 16', 37'	Report (in German)	Dundee 18'	Stadium: Ostseestadion; Attendance: 12,500; Referee: Hellmut Krug (Gelsenkirchen)

=== Semi-finals ===
15 February 2000	Werder Bremen	2–1 (a.e.t.)	Stuttgarter Kickers	Bremen
	Dabrowski 2'; Maximov 103'	Report (in German)	Özkan 83'	Stadium: Weserstadion; Attendance: 18,700; Referee: Jürgen Jansen (Essen)

16 February 2000	Bayern Munich	3–2	Hansa Rostock	Munich
	Santa Cruz 58', 66'; Kuffour 76'	Report (in German)	Weilandt 75'; Wibran 82'	Stadium: Olympiastadion; Attendance: 10,000; Referee: Edgar Steinborn (Sinzig)

=== Final ===
6 May 2000
19:30 CEST

Werder Bremen	0–3	Bayern Munich
	Report	Élber 57'; Paulo Sérgio 83'; Scholl 90'

Olympiastadion, Berlin
Attendance: 76,000
Referee: Alfons Berg (Konz)
