= List of SC Freiburg seasons =

This is a list of the seasons played by SC Freiburg, from their entry into the Kreisliga Südwest in 1920 until the present day. The club's achievements in all major national and international competitions are listed.

Freiburg's greatest league successes are its four 2. Bundesliga titles, which came in 1993, 2003, 2009 and 2016. Since the creation of the Bundesliga in 1963, Freiburg has spent 24 seasons in this top division, with a best result of 3rd in 1995. The club also spent 22 seasons in the second tier 2. Bundesliga, and the remaining 15 seasons in the third tier Amateruliga.

== Southern German football championship (1920–1933) ==
| Season | Division | Pld | W | D | L | GF | GA | GD | Pts | Rank | SDFM | Pld | W | D | L | GF | GA | GD | Pts | Rank |
|---|---|---|---|---|---|---|---|---|---|---|---|---|---|---|---|---|---|---|---|---|
| 1920–21 | Kreisliga Südwest (1) | 18 | 6 | 5 | 7 | 22 | 26 | -4 | 17 | 6th | | | | | | | | | | |
| 1921–22 | Kreisliga Südwest (1) | 14 | 8 | 1 | 5 | 33 | 18 | 15 | 17 | 4th | | | | | | | | | | |
| 1922–23 | Kreisliga Südwest (1) | 14 | 6 | 1 | 7 | 22 | 29 | -7 | 13 | 6th | | | | | | | | | | |
The structure of the Southern German football championship was reorganised in 1923, and Freiburg did not qualify for the new top division. They returned in 1924.
| 1924–25 | Bezirksliga Württemberg- Baden (1) | 14 | 2 | 4 | 8 | 13 | 31 | -18 | 8 | 7th | | | | | | | | | | |
| 1925–26 | ? (2) | | | | | | | | | | | | | | | | | | | |
| 1926–27 | Bezirksliga Württemberg- Baden (1) | 18 | 8 | 1 | 9 | 49 | 44 | 5 | 17 | 5th | | | | | | | | | | |
| 1927–28 | Bezirksliga Baden (1) | 14 | 8 | 3 | 3 | 32 | 17 | 15 | 19 | 3rd | 2nd/3rd Grp Südost | 14 | 5 | 5 | 4 | 25 | 29 | -4 | 15 | 5th |
| 1928–29 | Bezirksliga Baden (1) | 14 | 7 | 1 | 6 | 28 | 32 | -4 | 15 | 5th | | | | | | | | | | |
| 1929–30 | Bezirksliga Baden (1) | 14 | 3 | 2 | 9 | 23 | 38 | -15 | 8 | 7th | | | | | | | | | | |
| 1930–31 | Bezirksliga Baden (1) | 14 | 4 | 3 | 7 | 19 | 35 | -16 | 11 | 7th | | | | | | | | | | |
| 1931–32 | Bezirksliga Baden (1) | 18 | 8 | 2 | 8 | 51 | 50 | 1 | 18 | 4th | | | | | | | | | | |
| 1932–33 | Bezirksliga Baden (1) | 18 | 8 | 2 | 8 | 33 | 37 | -4 | 18 | 6th | | | | | | | | | | |

== German football championship (1933–1963) ==
| Season | Division | Pld | W | D | L | GF | GA | GD | Pts | Rank | DFM/ P-O | Pld | W | D | L | GF | GA | GD | Pts | Rank |
|---|---|---|---|---|---|---|---|---|---|---|---|---|---|---|---|---|---|---|---|---|
| 1933–34 | Gauliga Baden (1) | 18 | 2 | 2 | 14 | 21 | 54 | -33 | 6 | 10th | | | | | | | | | | |
| 1934–35 | Bezirksliga Freiburg (2) | | | | | | | | | | | | | | | | | | | |
| 1935–36 | Bezirksliga Freiburg (2) | | | | | | | | | 1st | Play-offs | 6 | 0 | 2 | 4 | 6 | 17 | -11 | 2 | 4th |
| 1936–37 | Bezirksliga Oberbaden-Süd (2) | | | | | | | | | 1st | Play-offs | 12 | 3 | 1 | 8 | 20 | 34 | -14 | 7 | 6th |
| 1937–38 | Bezirksliga Oberbaden-Süd (2) | | | | | | | | | 1st | Play-offs; Grp Süd | 4 | 2 | 0 | 2 | 14 | 8 | 6 | 4 | 2nd |
| 1938–39 | Bezirksliga Oberbaden-Süd (2) | | | | | | | | | | | | | | | | | | | |
Due to the outbreak of World War II, the structure of the German football championship was reorganised in 1939. Freiburg was reassigned to the new top division.
| 1939–40 | Gauliga Freiburg (1) | 8 | 5 | 2 | 1 | 22 | 16 | 6 | 12 | 2nd | | | | | | | | | | |
| 1940–41 | Klasse Breisgau (2) | | | | | | | | | 1st | Play-offs; Grp Süd | 4 | 3 | 1 | 0 | 8 | 3 | 5 | 7 | 1st |
| 1941–42 | Gauliga Südbaden (1) | 10 | 3 | 0 | 7 | 23 | 34 | -11 | 6 | 6th | | | | | | | | | | |
| 1942–43 | Klasse Breisgau (2) | | | | | | | | | 1st | Play-offs; Grp Süd | 2 | 1 | 0 | 1 | 9 | 3 | 6 | 2 | 1st |
| 1943–44 | Gauliga Südbaden (1) | 10 | 1 | 3 | 6 | 14 | 36 | -22 | 5 | 5th | | | | | | | | | | |
No football took place in 1944–45 due to World War II. In 1945, Freiburg was reassigned to the new second division, and renamed VfL Freiburg.
| 1945–46 | Oberklasse Südbaden West (2) | 16 | | | | 44 | 26 | 18 | 22 | 3rd | | | | | | | | | | |
| 1946–47 | Oberliga Südwest Süd (1) | 14 | 5 | 2 | 7 | 32 | 30 | 2 | 12 | 7th | | | | | | | | | | |
| 1947–48 | Oberliga Südwest Süd (1) | 22 | 8 | 5 | 9 | 30 | 31 | -1 | 21 | 9th | | | | | | | | | | |
| 1948–49 | Oberliga Südwest Süd (1) | 23 | 8 | 4 | 11 | 31 | 39 | -8 | 20 | 9th | | | | | | | | | | |
In 1949, VfL Freiburg returned to its original name of SC Freiburg.
| 1949–50 | Oberliga Südwest Süd (1) | 30 | 9 | 6 | 15 | 52 | 63 | -11 | 24 | 12th | | | | | | | | | | |
The structure of the German football championship was reorganised in 1950, and Freiburg was reassigned to the new third division.
| 1950–51 | Amateurliga Südbaden (3) | 30 | | | | 73 | 51 | 22 | 36 | 5th | | | | | | | | | | |
| 1951–52 | Amateurliga Südbaden (3) | 34 | | | | 81 | 48 | 33 | 44 | 4th | | | | | | | | | | |
| 1952–53 | Amateurliga Südbaden (3) | 30 | | | | 57 | 56 | 1 | 30 | 7th | | | | | | | | | | |
| 1953–54 | Amateurliga Südbaden (3) | 30 | | | | 62 | 58 | 4 | 36 | 5th | | | | | | | | | | |
| 1954–55 | Amateurliga Südbaden (3) | 30 | | | | 50 | 70 | -20 | 21 | 14th | | | | | | | | | | |
| 1955–56 | Amateurliga Südbaden (3) | 30 | | | | 56 | 58 | -2 | 28 | 8th | | | | | | | | | | |
| 1956–57 | Amateurliga Südbaden (3) | 30 | | | | 41 | 56 | -15 | 23 | 14th | | | | | | | | | | |
| 1957–58 | Amateurliga Südbaden (3) | 30 | | | | 56 | 63 | -7 | 28 | 9th | | | | | | | | | | |
| 1958–59 | Amateurliga Südbaden (3) | 30 | | | | 32 | 53 | -21 | 23 | 12th | | | | | | | | | | |
| 1959–60 | Amateurliga Südbaden (3) | 30 | | | | 57 | 69 | -12 | 25 | 12th | | | | | | | | | | |
| 1960–61 | Amateurliga Südbaden (3) | 30 | | | | 69 | 80 | -11 | 26 | 10th | | | | | | | | | | |
| 1961–62 | Amateurliga Südbaden (3) | 30 | | | | 59 | 59 | 0 | 31 | 7th | | | | | | | | | | |
| 1962–63 | Amateurliga Südbaden (3) | 30 | | | | 47 | 54 | -7 | 24 | 14th | | | | | | | | | | |

== Bundesliga (1963–present) ==
| Season | Division | Pld | W | D | L | GF | GA | GD | Pts | Rank | Cup | Other | Res. | Top scorer(s) |
|---|---|---|---|---|---|---|---|---|---|---|---|---|---|---|
| 1963–64 | Amateurliga Südbaden (3) | 30 | | | | 36 | 73 | −37 | 16 | 15th | | | | |
| 1964–65 | Amateurliga Südbaden (3) | 30 | | | | 64 | 31 | 33 | 44 | 1st | | Play-offs | 3rd | |
| 1965–66 | Amateurliga Südbaden (3) | 32 | | | | 50 | 59 | −9 | 30 | 9th | | | | |
| 1966–67 | Amateurliga Südbaden (3) | 30 | | | | 54 | 51 | 3 | 29 | 10th | | | | |
| 1967–68 | Amateurliga Südbaden (3) | 30 | | | | 61 | 32 | 29 | 61 | 1st | | Play-offs | 3rd | |
| 1968–69 | Amateurliga Südbaden (3) | 30 | | | | 34 | 42 | −8 | 26 | 12th | | | | |
| 1969–70 | Amateurliga Südbaden (3) | 30 | | | | 46 | 35 | 11 | 34 | 4th | | | | |
| 1970–71 | Amateurliga Südbaden (3) | 30 | | | | 53 | 37 | 16 | 37 | 3rd | | | | |
| 1971–72 | Amateurliga Südbaden (3) | 30 | | | | 45 | 46 | −1 | 28 | 8th | | | | |
| 1972–73 | Amateurliga Südbaden (3) | 30 | | | | 55 | 40 | 15 | 31 | 7th | | | | |
| 1973–74 | Amateurliga Südbaden (3) | 30 | | | | 62 | 35 | 27 | 37 | 6th | | | | |
| 1974–75 | Amateurliga Südbaden (3) | 30 | | | | 87 | 36 | 51 | 61 | 2nd | | | | |
| 1975–76 | Amateurliga Südbaden (3) | 34 | | | | 67 | 46 | 21 | 38 | 6th | R2 | | | |
| 1976–77 | Amateurliga Südbaden (3) | 34 | | | | 79 | 40 | 39 | 47 | 2nd | R1 | | | |
| 1977–78 | Amateurliga Südbaden (3) | 34 | | | | 78 | 28 | 50 | 52 | 1st | | Play-offs | 1st | |
| 1978–79 | 2. Bundesliga Süd (2) | 38 | 11 | 10 | 17 | 51 | 75 | −24 | 32 | 15th | R3 | | | (West Germany) Paul Dörflinger, 20 |
| 1979–80 | 2. Bundesliga Süd (2) | 40 | 18 | 10 | 12 | 68 | 54 | 14 | 46 | 6th | R1 | | | (West Germany) Joachim Löw, 14 (West Germany) Wolfgang Schüler, 14 |
| 1980–81 | 2. Bundesliga Süd (2) | 38 | 16 | 9 | 13 | 57 | 50 | 7 | 41 | 7th | R4 | | | (West Germany) Robert Birner, 10 |
| 1981–82 | 2. Bundesliga (2) | 38 | 11 | 12 | 15 | 49 | 54 | −5 | 34 | 15th | R2 | | | (West Germany) Robert Birner, 12 |
| 1982–83 | 2. Bundesliga (2) | 38 | 13 | 16 | 9 | 50 | 45 | 5 | 42 | 8th | R1 | | | (West Germany) Hans Meisel, 10 |
| 1983–84 | 2. Bundesliga (2) | 38 | 13 | 17 | 8 | 50 | 49 | 1 | 43 | 7th | R2 | | | (West Germany) Joachim Löw, 17 |
| 1984–85 | 2. Bundesliga (2) | 38 | 14 | 10 | 14 | 45 | 49 | −4 | 38 | 8th | R1 | | | (Socialist Federal Republic of Yugoslavia) Milorad Pilipović, 10 |
| 1985–86 | 2. Bundesliga (2) | 38 | 12 | 9 | 17 | 54 | 62 | −8 | 33 | 16th | R1 | | | (Senegal) Souleyman Sané, 18 |
| 1986–87 | 2. Bundesliga (2) | 38 | 13 | 13 | 12 | 59 | 56 | 3 | 39 | 8th | R2 | | | (West Germany) Joachim Löw, 17 (Senegal) Souleyman Sané, 17 |
| 1987–88 | 2. Bundesliga (2) | 38 | 13 | 12 | 13 | 61 | 63 | −2 | 38 | 10th | R2 | | | (Senegal) Souleyman Sané, 21 |
| 1988–89 | 2. Bundesliga (2) | 38 | 17 | 8 | 13 | 66 | 52 | 14 | 42 | 5th | R1 | | | (Poland) Marek Majka, 11 |
| 1989–90 | 2. Bundesliga (2) | 38 | 11 | 12 | 15 | 53 | 52 | 1 | 34 | 13th | R2 | | | (West Germany) Holger Janz, 11 (Poland) Marek Majka, 11 (Greece) Dimitrios Moutas, 11 |
| 1990–91 | 2. Bundesliga (2) | 38 | 15 | 10 | 13 | 54 | 48 | 6 | 40 | 9th | R1 | | | (Germany) Niels Schlotterbeck, 16 |
| 1991–92 | 2. Bundesliga Süd (2) | 32 | 13 | 11 | 8 | 52 | 41 | 11 | 37 | 3rd | R2 | | | (Germany) Uwe Spies, 11 |
| 1992–93 | 2. Bundesliga (2) | 46 | 27 | 11 | 8 | 102 | 57 | 45 | 65 | 1st | R2 | | | (Albania) Altin Rraklli, 16 |
| 1993–94 | Bundesliga (1) | 34 | 10 | 8 | 16 | 54 | 57 | −3 | 28 | 15th | QF | | | (Argentina) Rodolfo Cardoso, 12 |
| 1994–95 | Bundesliga (1) | 34 | 20 | 6 | 8 | 66 | 44 | 22 | 46 | 3rd | R1 | | | (Argentina) Rodolfo Cardoso, 16 |
From 1995, 3 points were awarded for a win.
| 1995–96 | Bundesliga (1) | 34 | 11 | 9 | 14 | 30 | 41 | −11 | 42 | 11th | R3 | UEFA Cup | R1 | (Netherlands) Harry Decheiver, 11 |
| 1996–97 | Bundesliga (1) | 34 | 8 | 5 | 21 | 43 | 67 | −24 | 29 | 17th | QF | | | (Germany) Uwe Wassmer, 7 |
| 1997–98 | 2. Bundesliga (2) | 34 | 18 | 7 | 9 | 57 | 36 | 21 | 61 | 2nd | R1 | | | (Germany) Marco Weißhaupt, 16 |
| 1998–99 | Bundesliga (1) | 34 | 10 | 9 | 15 | 36 | 44 | −8 | 39 | 12th | R2 | | | (Tunisia) Zoubeir Baya, 6 (Georgia (country)) Alexander Iashvili, 6 (Germany) Marco Weißhaupt, 6 |
| 1999–2000 | Bundesliga (1) | 34 | 10 | 10 | 14 | 45 | 50 | −5 | 40 | 12th | QF | | | (Tunisia) Adel Sellimi, 11 |
| 2000–01 | Bundesliga (1) | 34 | 15 | 10 | 9 | 54 | 37 | 17 | 55 | 6th | QF | | | (Tunisia) Adel Sellimi, 10 |
| 2001–02 | Bundesliga (1) | 34 | 7 | 9 | 18 | 37 | 64 | −27 | 30 | 16th | R2 | UEFA Cup | R3 | (Mali) Soumaila Coulibaly, 6 |
| 2002–03 | 2. Bundesliga (2) | 34 | 20 | 7 | 7 | 58 | 32 | 26 | 67 | 1st | R3 | | | (Bosnia and Herzegovina) Zlatan Bajramović, 15 |
| 2003–04 | Bundesliga (1) | 34 | 10 | 8 | 16 | 42 | 67 | −25 | 38 | 13th | R3 | | | (Georgia (country)) Alexander Iashvili, 9 |
| 2004–05 | Bundesliga (1) | 34 | 3 | 9 | 22 | 30 | 75 | −45 | 18 | 18th | QF | | | (Mali) Soumaila Coulibaly, 6 |
| 2005–06 | 2. Bundesliga (2) | 34 | 16 | 8 | 10 | 41 | 33 | 8 | 56 | 4th | R3 | | | (Mali) Soumaila Coulibaly, 7 |
| 2006–07 | 2. Bundesliga (2) | 34 | 17 | 9 | 8 | 55 | 39 | 16 | 60 | 4th | R2 | | | (Lebanon) Roda Antar, 10 (Georgia (country)) Alexander Iashvili, 10 |
| 2007–08 | 2. Bundesliga (2) | 34 | 15 | 10 | 9 | 49 | 44 | 5 | 55 | 5th | R2 | | | (Burkina Faso) Jonathan Pitroipa, 7 |
| 2008–09 | 2. Bundesliga (2) | 34 | 21 | 5 | 8 | 60 | 36 | 24 | 68 | 1st | R3 | | | (Cameroon) Mohammadou Idrissou, 13 |
| 2009–10 | Bundesliga (1) | 34 | 9 | 8 | 17 | 35 | 59 | −24 | 35 | 14th | R2 | | | (Cameroon) Mohammadou Idrissou, 9 |
| 2010–11 | Bundesliga (1) | 34 | 13 | 5 | 16 | 41 | 50 | −9 | 44 | 9th | R2 | | | (Senegal) Papiss Cissé, 22 |
| 2011–12 | Bundesliga (1) | 34 | 10 | 10 | 14 | 45 | 61 | −16 | 40 | 12th | R1 | | | (Senegal) Papiss Cissé, 9 |
| 2012–13 | Bundesliga (1) | 34 | 14 | 9 | 11 | 45 | 40 | 5 | 51 | 5th | SF | | | (Germany) Max Kruse, 11 (France) Jonathan Schmid, 11 |
| 2013–14 | Bundesliga (1) | 34 | 9 | 9 | 16 | 43 | 61 | −18 | 36 | 14th | R3 | Europa League | Grp | (Switzerland) Admir Mehmedi, 12 |
| 2014–15 | Bundesliga (1) | 34 | 7 | 13 | 14 | 36 | 47 | −11 | 34 | 17th | QF | | | (Germany) Nils Petersen, 9 |
| 2015–16 | 2. Bundesliga (2) | 34 | 22 | 6 | 6 | 75 | 39 | 36 | 72 | 1st | R2 | | | (Germany) Nils Petersen, 21 |
| 2016–17 | Bundesliga (1) | 34 | 14 | 6 | 14 | 42 | 60 | −18 | 48 | 7th | R2 | | | (Germany) Florian Niederlechner, 11 |
| 2017–18 | Bundesliga (1) | 34 | 8 | 12 | 14 | 32 | 56 | −24 | 36 | 15th | R3 | Europa League | 3QR | (Germany) Nils Petersen, 15 |
| 2018–19 | Bundesliga (1) | 34 | 8 | 12 | 14 | 46 | 61 | −15 | 36 | 13th | R2 | | | (Germany) Nils Petersen, 10 |
| 2019–20 | Bundesliga (1) | 34 | 13 | 9 | 12 | 48 | 47 | 1 | 48 | 8th | R2 | | | (Germany) Nils Petersen, 11 |
| 2020–21 | Bundesliga (1) | 34 | 12 | 9 | 13 | 52 | 52 | 0 | 45 | 10th | R2 | | | (Italy) Vincenzo Grifo, 9 |
| 2021–22 | Bundesliga (1) | 34 | 15 | 10 | 9 | 58 | 46 | 12 | 55 | 6th | RU | | | (Italy) Vincenzo Grifo, 9 |
| 2022–23 | Bundesliga (1) | 34 | 17 | 8 | 9 | 51 | 44 | 7 | 59 | 5th | SF | Europa League | R16 | (Italy) Vincenzo Grifo, 15 |
| 2023–24 | Bundesliga (1) | 34 | 11 | 9 | 14 | 45 | 58 | −13 | 42 | 10th | R2 | Europa League | R16 | (Italy) Vincenzo Grifo, 8 |
| 2024–25 | Bundesliga (1) | 34 | 16 | 7 | 11 | 49 | 53 | −4 | 55 | 5th | R16 | | | (Japan) Ritsu Dōan, 10 |
| 2025–26 | Bundesliga (1) | 34 | 13 | 8 | 13 | 51 | 57 | −6 | 47 | 7th | SF | Europa League | RU | (Croatia) Igor Matanović, 11 |
