= 1994–95 SC Freiburg season =

SC Freiburg
1994–95 season
- Manager: Volker Finke
- Bundesliga: 3rd
- DFB-Pokal: First round
- Top goalscorer: Rodolfo Cardoso

During the 1994–95 season, SC Freiburg competed in the Bundesliga.

== Season summary ==
The previous season, Freiburg had only avoided relegation on goal difference. This season, however, Freiburg finished third, 3 points off champions Borussia Dortmund, and above more favoured teams like Bayern Munich and Bayer Leverkusen. As a result, Freiburg qualified for European competition for the first time ever, entering the 1995–96 UEFA Cup.

== Players ==
=== First-team squad ===
Note: Flags indicate national team as defined under FIFA eligibility rules; some limited exceptions apply. Players may hold more than one non-FIFA nationality.

No.	Pos.	Nation	Player
—	GK	GER	Stefan Beneking
—	GK	GER	Dietmar Hummel
—	GK	GER	Jörg Schmadtke
—	DF	GER	Jörg Heinrich
—	DF	GER	Stefan Müller
—	DF	GER	Martin Spanring
—	DF	GER	Axel Sundermann
—	DF	GER	Thomas Vogel
—	DF	CRO	Damir Burić
—	MF	GER	Martin Braun
—	MF	GER	Oliver Freund

No.	Pos.	Nation	Player
—	MF	GER	Maximilian Heidenreich
—	MF	GER	Jens Todt
—	MF	GER	Ralf Kohl
—	MF	GER	Karsten Neitzel
—	MF	GER	Andreas Zeyer
—	MF	RUS	Aleksandr Borodyuk
—	MF	ARG	Rodolfo Cardoso
—	FW	GER	Uwe Spies
—	FW	GER	Uwe Wassmer
—	FW	ALB	Altin Rraklli
—	FW	GRE	Paschalis Seretis

== Competitions ==
=== Bundesliga ===
==== League table ====
Pos	Team	Pld	W	D	L	GF	GA	GD	Pts	Qualification or relegation
1	Borussia Dortmund (C)	34	20	9	5	67	33	+34	49	Qualification to Champions League group stage
2	Werder Bremen	34	20	8	6	70	39	+31	48	Qualification to UEFA Cup first round
3	SC Freiburg	34	20	6	8	66	44	+22	46	Qualification to UEFA Cup first round
4	1. FC Kaiserslautern	34	17	12	5	58	41	+17	46	Qualification to UEFA Cup first round
5	Borussia Mönchengladbach	34	17	9	8	66	41	+25	43	Qualification to Cup Winners' Cup first round

Source: www.dfb.de
Rules for classification: 1) points; 2) goal difference; 3) number of goals scored.
(C) Champions

==== Matches ====
26 August 1994	Dynamo Dresden	1–3	SC Freiburg	Dresden
15:30	Dittgen 47'	Report	Müller 13'; Spies 64'; Rodolfo Cardoso 81'	Stadium: Rudolf-Harbig-Stadion; Attendance: 16,500; Referee: Heinz-Dieter Casper (Dortmund)

16 September 1994	VfL Bochum	1–3	SC Freiburg	Bochum
20:00	Aden 57'		Cardoso 2'; Spies 34', 90'	Stadium: Ruhrstadion; Attendance: 16,334; Referee: Alfons Berg (Konz)

12 November 1994	SC Freiburg	2–0	Eintracht Frankfurt	Freiburg
15:30 CEST	Roth 53' (o.g.); Cardoso 75' (pen.)	(Report)		Stadium: Dreisamstadion; Attendance: 18,000; Referee: Fischer

4 March 1995	SC Freiburg	3–1	Dynamo Dresden	Freiburg
15:30	Heinrich 43'; Zeyer 45'; Cardoso 80'	Report	Rath 37'	Stadium: Dreisamstadion; Attendance: 18,000; Referee: Georg Dardenne (Nettersheim)

18 March 1995	SC Freiburg	1–2	VfL Bochum	Freiburg
15:30	Wassmer 86'		Wegmann 17' (pen.); Wosz 63'	Stadium: Dreisamstadion; Attendance: 18,000; Referee: Volkmar Fischer (St. Wendel)

13 May 1995	Eintracht Frankfurt	1–2	SC Freiburg	Frankfurt, Germany
15:30 CEST	Komljenović 5'	(Report)	Cardoso 16'; Köpke 53' (o.g.)	Stadium: Waldstadion; Attendance: 35,000; Referee: Aust

=== DFB-Pokal ===
13 August 1994	Stuttgarter Kickers	3–1	SC Freiburg	Stuttgart
19:00	Hofacker 17', 86' (pen.); Volke 90'	Report (in German)	Todt 30'	Stadium: Kickers-Stadion; Attendance: 3,600; Referee: Hans-Peter Best (Kämpfelbach)
