= 1990 FDGB-Pokal final =

East German Cup final
- Event: 1989–90 FDGB-Pokal
Dynamo Dresden	PSV Schwerin
2	1
- Date: 2 June 1990
- Venue: Friedrich-Ludwig-Jahn-Sportpark, East Berlin
- Referee: Karl-Heinz Gläser (Breitungen)
- Attendance: 5,750

The 1990 FDGB-Pokal final decided the winner of the 1989–90 FDGB-Pokal, the 39th season of East Germany's premier knockout football cup competition. It was played on 2 June 1990 at the Friedrich-Ludwig-Jahn-Sportpark in East Berlin. Dynamo Dresden won the match 2–1 against PSV Schwerin for their 5th title.

== Route to the final ==
The FDGB-Pokal began with 64 teams in a single-elimination knockout cup competition. There were a total of five rounds leading up to the final. Teams were drawn against each other, and the winner after 90 minutes would advance. If still tied, extra time, and if necessary penalties were used to determine the winner.

Note: In all results below, the score of the finalist is given first (H: home; A: away).

Dynamo Dresden		Round	PSV Schwerin
Opponent	Result	1989–90 FDGB-Pokal	Opponent	Result
Wismut Aue II (A)	6–0	Round 1	Motor Babelsberg (A)	2–0
Aktivist Brieske-Senftenberg (A)	4–1	Round 2	Stahl Riesa (H)	3–1
Stahl Eisenhüttenstadt (H)	6–0	Round of 16	Schiffahrt/Hafen Rostock (H)	3–2
FC Karl-Marx-Stadt (H)	4–0	Quarter-finals	1. FC Magdeburg (H)	3–1
Vorwärts Frankfurt/Oder (H)	3–0	Semi-finals	Lokomotive Leipzig (H)	1–0

== Match ==
=== Details ===
2 June 1990
14:00 CEST

Dynamo Dresden	2–1	PSV Schwerin
Stübner 18'; Kirsten 84'	Report	Kort 5'

Friedrich-Ludwig-Jahn-Sportpark, East Berlin
Attendance: 5,750
Referee: Karl-Heinz Gläser (Breitungen)

Dynamo Dresden	PSV Schwerin

GK	1	(East Germany) Frank Schulze
SW		(East Germany) Frank Lieberam
RB		(East Germany) Detlef Schößler
CB		(East Germany) Andreas Wagenhaus	Booked
CB		(East Germany) Steffen Büttner
LB		(East Germany) Matthias Döschner		(substituted off) 74'
CM		(East Germany) Jörg Stübner	Booked
CM		(East Germany) Matthias Sammer
CM		(East Germany) Hans-Uwe Pilz	(red card) 52'
CF		(East Germany) Ulf Kirsten
CF		(East Germany) Torsten Gütschow		(substituted off) 87'
Substitutes:
MF		(East Germany) Sven Ratke		(substituted in) 74'
FW		(East Germany) Ralf Minge		(substituted in) 87'
Manager:
(East Germany) Reinhard Häfner

GK	1	(East Germany) Andreas Reinke
SW		(East Germany) Gerbert Eggert	Booked
CB		(East Germany) Frank Beutling
CB		(East Germany) Peter Herzberg
RM		(East Germany) Ulrich Ruppach	Booked
CM		(East Germany) Mario Drews
CM		(East Germany) Frank Prange
CM		(East Germany) Matthias Stammann
LM		(East Germany) Andre Kort
CF		(East Germany) Dirk Gottschkalk	Booked	(substituted off) 76'
CF		(East Germany) Steffen Baumgart		(substituted off) 66'
Substitutes:
FW		(East Germany) Steffen Benthin		(substituted in) 66'
FW		(East Germany) Sven Buschsteiner		(substituted in) 76'
Manager:
(East Germany) Manfred Radtke

== See also ==
- Deutschland-Cup (football)
