= Thomas Vogel =

Thomas Vogel may refer to:

- Thomas Vogel (historian) (born 1959), German historian
- Thomas Vogel (footballer, born 1965), German footballer
- Thomas Vogel (footballer, born 1967), German footballer
