= 2003–04 Football League =

105th season of the Football League

The Football League
- Season: 2003–04
- Champions: Norwich City
- Promoted: Norwich City; West Bromwich Albion; Crystal Palace
- Relegated: Carlisle United; York City
- New Clubs in League: Yeovil Town; Doncaster Rovers

The 2003–04 Football League (known as the Nationwide Football League for sponsorship reasons) was the 105th completed season of The Football League.

This was the last season of the Football League with the Nationwide Building Society as title sponsor, and the last in which the divisions were known as the First, Second and Third Divisions: from the following season they would be known as the Championship, League One and League Two respectively.

Norwich City won the First Division, thus returning to the Premier League for the first time since 1994–95. Also promoted to the top flight were West Bromwich Albion and Crystal Palace. Plymouth Argyle won the Second Division, while Doncaster Rovers won the Third.

== Final league tables and results ==
The tables below are reproduced here in the exact form that they can be found at The Rec.Sport.Soccer Statistics Foundation website, with home and away statistics separated. Play-off results are from the same website.

== First Division ==
First Division
- Season: 2003–04
- Champions: Norwich City
- Promoted: Norwich City; West Bromwich Albion; Crystal Palace
- Relegated: Walsall; Bradford City; Wimbledon
- UEFA Cup: Millwall
- Matches: 552
- Goals: 1,435 (2.6 per match)
- Top goalscorer: Andrew Johnson (27 goals)

Pos	Team	Pld	W	D	L	GF	GA	GD	Pts	Promotion, qualification or relegation
1	Norwich City (C, P)	46	28	10	8	79	39	+40	94	Promotion to the FA Premier League
2	West Bromwich Albion (P)	46	25	11	10	64	42	+22	86	Promotion to the FA Premier League
3	Sunderland	46	22	13	11	62	45	+17	79	Qualification for the First Division play-offs
4	West Ham United	46	19	17	10	67	45	+22	74	Qualification for the First Division play-offs
5	Ipswich Town	46	21	10	15	84	72	+12	73	Qualification for the First Division play-offs
6	Crystal Palace (O, P)	46	21	10	15	72	61	+11	73	Qualification for the First Division play-offs
7	Wigan Athletic	46	18	17	11	60	45	+15	71	
8	Sheffield United	46	20	11	15	65	56	+9	71	
9	Reading	46	20	10	16	55	57	−2	70	
10	Millwall	46	18	15	13	55	48	+7	69	Qualification for the UEFA Cup first round (Note: Since the FA Cup winners Manchester United qualified for the Champions League, their place in the UEFA Cup went to Millwall, who were the FA Cup runners-up.)
11	Stoke City	46	18	12	16	58	55	+3	66	
12	Coventry City	46	17	14	15	67	54	+13	65	
13	Cardiff City	46	17	14	15	68	58	+10	65	
14	Nottingham Forest	46	15	15	16	61	58	+3	60	
15	Preston North End	46	15	14	17	69	71	−2	59	
16	Watford	46	15	12	19	54	68	−14	57	
17	Rotherham United	46	13	15	18	53	61	−8	54	
18	Crewe Alexandra	46	14	11	21	57	66	−9	53	
19	Burnley	46	13	14	19	60	77	−17	53	
20	Derby County	46	13	13	20	53	67	−14	52	
21	Gillingham	46	14	9	23	48	67	−19	51	
22	Walsall (R)	46	13	12	21	45	65	−20	51	Relegation to Football League One
23	Bradford City (R)	46	10	6	30	38	69	−31	36	Relegation to Football League One
24	Wimbledon (R)	46	8	5	33	41	89	−48	29	Renamed Milton Keynes Dons in Football League One

Source: Soccerway
Rules for classification: 1) points; 2) goal difference; 3) number of goals scored.
(C) Champions; (O) Play-off winners; (P) Promoted; (R) Relegated

=== Play-offs ===
Semi-finals; 1st leg – 14/15 May; 2nd leg – 17/18 May 2004
3rd	Sunderland	2	2	4 (4)
6th	Crystal Palace (pens.)	3	1	4 (5)
4th	West Ham United	0	2	2
5th	Ipswich Town	1	0	1

Final at Millennium Stadium, Cardiff; 29 May 2004
6th	Crystal Palace	1
4th	West Ham United	0

=== Maps ===
Locations of the 2003–04 First Division teams
Locations of the London teams in the 2003–04 First Division

=== Top scorers ===
Rank	Player	Club	League
1	(England) Andrew Johnson	Crystal Palace	28
2	(England) Marlon Harewood	West Ham United / Nottingham Forest	25
3	(Wales) Robert Earnshaw	Cardiff City	21
4	(England) Dean Ashton	Crewe Alexandra	19
=	(England) Robbie Blake	Burnley	19
6	(England) Nathan Ellington	Wigan Athletic	18
7	(England) Darren Bent	Ipswich Town	17
=	(Jamaica) Ricardo Fuller	Preston North End	17
9	(England) Marcus Stewart	Sunderland	16
10	(Northern Ireland) David Healy	Preston North End	15
=	(England) Martin Butler	Rotherham United	15
=	(Northern Ireland) Steve Jones	Crewe Alexandra	15

== Second Division ==
Football League Second Division
- Season: 2003–04
- Champions: Plymouth Argyle
- Promoted: Plymouth Argyle; Queens Park Rangers; Brighton & Hove Albion
- Relegated: Grimsby Town; Notts County; Rushden & Diamonds; Wycombe Wanderers
- Matches: 552
- Goals: 1,460 (2.64 per match)
- Top goalscorer: Leon Knight (Brighton & Hove Albion), 25; Stephen McPhee (Port Vale), 25

Pos	Team	Pld	W	D	L	GF	GA	GD	Pts	Promotion or relegation
1	Plymouth Argyle (C, P)	46	26	12	8	85	41	+44	90	Promotion to Football League Championship
2	Queens Park Rangers (P)	46	22	17	7	80	45	+35	83	Promotion to Football League Championship
3	Bristol City	46	23	13	10	58	37	+21	82	Qualification for the Second Division play-offs
4	Brighton & Hove Albion (O, P)	46	22	11	13	64	43	+21	77	Qualification for the Second Division play-offs
5	Swindon Town	46	20	13	13	76	58	+18	73	Qualification for the Second Division play-offs
6	Hartlepool United	46	20	13	13	76	61	+15	73	Qualification for the Second Division play-offs
7	Port Vale	46	21	10	15	73	63	+10	73	
8	Tranmere Rovers	46	17	16	13	59	56	+3	67	
9	Bournemouth	46	17	15	14	56	51	+5	66	
10	Luton Town	46	17	15	14	69	66	+3	66	
11	Colchester United	46	17	13	16	52	56	−4	64	
12	Barnsley	46	15	17	14	54	58	−4	62	
13	Wrexham	46	17	9	20	50	60	−10	60	
14	Blackpool	46	16	11	19	58	65	−7	59	
15	Oldham Athletic	46	12	21	13	66	60	+6	57	
16	Sheffield Wednesday	46	13	14	19	48	64	−16	53	
17	Brentford	46	14	11	21	52	69	−17	53	
18	Peterborough United	46	12	16	18	58	58	0	52	
19	Stockport County	46	11	19	16	62	70	−8	52	
20	Chesterfield	46	12	15	19	49	71	−22	51	
21	Grimsby Town (R)	46	13	11	22	55	81	−26	50	Relegation to Football League Two
22	Rushden & Diamonds (R)	46	13	9	24	60	74	−14	48	Relegation to Football League Two
23	Notts County (R)	46	10	12	24	50	78	−28	42	Relegation to Football League Two
24	Wycombe Wanderers (R)	46	6	19	21	50	75	−25	37	Relegation to Football League Two

Rules for classification: In the Football League goals scored (GF) takes precedence over goal difference (GD).
(C) Champions; (O) Play-off winners; (P) Promoted; (R) Relegated

=== Play-offs ===
Semi-finals; 1st leg – 15/16 May; 2nd leg – 19/20 May 2004
4th	Brighton & Hove Albion (pens.)	1	1	2 (4)
5th	Swindon Town	0	2	2 (3)
3rd	Bristol City	1	2	3
6th	Hartlepool United	1	1	2

Final at Millennium Stadium, Cardiff; 30 May 2004
4th	Brighton & Hove Albion	1
3rd	Bristol City	0

=== Maps ===
Locations of the 2003–04 Second Division teams
Locations of the London teams in the 2003–04 Second Division

=== Top scorers ===
Rank	Player	Club	Goals
1	(England) Leon Knight	Brighton & Hove Albion	26
2	(Scotland) Stephen McPhee	Port Vale	25
3	(Republic of Ireland) Paul Heffernan	Notts County	20
=	(England) Sam Parkin	Swindon Town	20
5	(England) Tommy Mooney	Swindon Town	19
6	(England) Kevin Gallen	Queens Park Rangers	17
7	(Ivory Coast) Eugene Dadi	Tranmere Rovers	16
=	(England) Paul Furlong	Queens Park Rangers	16
=	(England) Scott Taylor	Blackpool	16
10	(Jamaica) Onandi Lowe	Rushden & Diamonds	15

== Third Division ==
Football League Third Division
- Season: 2003–04
- Champions: Doncaster Rovers
- Promoted: Doncaster Rovers; Hull City; Torquay United; Huddersfield Town
- Relegated to Conference: Carlisle United; York City
- New clubs in the league: Doncaster Rovers; Yeovil Town
- Matches: 552
- Goals: 1,398 (2.53 per match)
- Top goalscorer: Steven MacLean (Scunthorpe United), 23

Pos	Team	Pld	W	D	L	GF	GA	GD	Pts	Promotion or relegation
1	Doncaster Rovers (C, P)	46	27	11	8	79	37	+42	92	Promotion to Football League One
2	Hull City (P)	46	25	13	8	82	44	+38	88	Promotion to Football League One
3	Torquay United (P)	46	23	12	11	68	44	+24	81	Promotion to Football League One
4	Huddersfield Town (O, P)	46	23	12	11	68	52	+16	81	Qualification for the Third Division play-offs
5	Mansfield Town	46	22	9	15	76	62	+14	75	Qualification for the Third Division play-offs
6	Northampton Town	46	22	9	15	58	51	+7	75	Qualification for the Third Division play-offs
7	Lincoln City	46	19	17	10	68	47	+21	74	Qualification for the Third Division play-offs
8	Yeovil Town	46	23	5	18	70	57	+13	74	
9	Oxford United	46	18	17	11	55	44	+11	71	
10	Swansea City	46	15	14	17	58	61	−3	59	
11	Boston United	46	16	11	19	50	54	−4	59	
12	Bury	46	15	11	20	54	64	−10	56	
13	Cambridge United	46	14	14	18	55	67	−12	56	
14	Cheltenham Town	46	14	14	18	57	71	−14	56	
15	Bristol Rovers	46	14	13	19	50	61	−11	55	
16	Kidderminster Harriers	46	14	13	19	45	59	−14	55	
17	Southend United	46	14	12	20	51	63	−12	54	
18	Darlington	46	14	11	21	53	61	−8	53	
19	Leyton Orient	46	13	14	19	48	65	−17	53	
20	Macclesfield Town	46	13	13	20	54	69	−15	52	
21	Rochdale	46	12	14	20	49	58	−9	50	
22	Scunthorpe United	46	11	16	19	69	72	−3	49	
23	Carlisle United (R)	46	12	9	25	46	69	−23	45	Relegation to Football Conference
24	York City (R)	46	10	14	22	35	66	−31	44	Relegation to Football Conference

Rules for classification: In the Football League goals scored (GF) takes precedence over goal difference (GD).
(C) Champions; (O) Play-off winners; (P) Promoted; (R) Relegated

=== Play-offs ===
Semi-finals; 1st leg – 15/16 May; 2nd leg – 19/20 May 2004
4th	Huddersfield Town	2	2	4
7th	Lincoln City	1	2	3
5th	Mansfield Town (pens.)	2	1	3 (5)
6th	Northampton Town	0	3	3 (4)

Final at Millennium Stadium, Cardiff; 31 May 2004
4th	Huddersfield Town (pens.)	0 (4)
5th	Mansfield Town	0 (1)

=== Maps ===
Locations of the 2003–04 Third Division teams

=== Top scorers ===
Rank	Player	Club	League
1	(Scotland) Steven MacLean	Scunthorpe United	23
2	(Scotland) David Graham	Torquay United	22
3	(England) Leon Constantine	Southend United	21
4	(Republic of Ireland) Liam Lawrence	Mansfield Town	19
5	(England) Gregg Blundell	Doncaster Rovers	18
=	(Republic of Ireland) Ben Burgess	Hull City	18
7	(England) Gary Fletcher	Lincoln City	17
=	(England) Lee Trundle	Swansea City	17
9	(Wales) Matthew Tipton	Macclesfield Town	16
=	(England) Jon Stead	Huddersfield Town	16

== See also ==
- 2003–04 in English football
- 2003 in association football
- 2004 in association football
