= Adnan Kevrić =

Bosnian former footballer (born 1970)

Personal information
- Date of birth: 2 May 1970 (age 56)
- Place of birth: Brčko, SFR Yugoslavia
- Height: 1.79 m (5 ft 10 in)
- Position: Midfielder

Youth career
- 1978–1984: SV Ottenau
- 1984–1988: SV Kuppenheim

Senior career*
Years	Team	Apps	(Gls)
1988–1989	SV Kuppenheim		
1989–1990	Offenburger FV	30	(2)
1990–1993	VfB Gaggenau	91	(10)
1993–2000	Stuttgarter Kickers	205	(46)
2000–2001	SSV Ulm	16	(1)
2001–2004	Eintracht Trier	70	(4)
2004–2005	FC Nöttingen	7	(0)
2005–2006	SpVgg Ludwigsburg		
2007–2008	TV Nellingen		

International career
1998–2000	Bosnia and Herzegovina	2	(0)

Managerial career
- 2006–2007: Eintracht Trier
- * Club domestic league appearances and goals

Adnan Kevrić (born 2 May 1970) is a Bosnian former professional footballer who played as a midfielder. He was the manager of Eintracht Trier between October 2006 and March 2007.

== Club career ==
Born in Brčko, Kevrić played for SV Ottenau, SV Kuppenheim, Offenburger FV, and VfB Gaggenau prior to signing for the Stuttgarter Kickers of the 2. Bundesliga in 1993. Kevrić spent seven years at Kickers and was the DFB-Pokal top scorer for the 1999–2000 season. He spent the 2000–01 season with SSV Ulm 1846 before joining Eintracht Trier of the Regionalliga Süd in summer 2001. Despite suffering a torn cruciate ligament in September 2001, he was promoted to the 2. Bundesliga with Trier in his first season at the club and became club captain. However, he left the club at the end of the 2003–04 season after falling out with manager Paul Linz and subsequently had spells playing at FC Nöttingen, SpVgg Ludwigsburg and TV Nellingen.

== International career ==
Kevrić was capped twice by the Bosnia and Herzegovina national team. His first appearance for Bosnia and Herzegovina came on 14 May 1998 in a 5–0 defeat to Argentina, before his second came on 24 January 2000 in a 2–0 defeat to Qatar.

== Managerial career ==
After Eintracht Trier suffered a second consecutive relegation in the 2005–06 season to the Oberliga, Kevrić took up the role of sporting director at Eintracht. He took up the role of manager at the club in October 2006 before leaving his role at the club in March 2007.

== Style of play ==
Kevrić played as a playmaker.

== Personal life ==
Kevrić's daughter Helen is a gymnast. Since retiring from football, Kevrić worked as a financial advisor before taking up roles for Daimler AG in Untertürkheim and TuS Stuttgart.

== Career statistics ==
=== Club ===
Appearances and goals by club, season and competition
Club	Season	League			DFB-Pokal		Total	
Club	Season	Division	Apps	Goals	Apps	Goals	Apps	Goals
Offenburger FV	1989–90	Oberliga Baden-Württemberg	30	2	—		30	2
VfB Gaggenau	1990–91	Oberliga Baden-Württemberg	32	4	—		32	4
VfB Gaggenau	1991–92	Oberliga Baden-Württemberg	26	1	—		26	1
VfB Gaggenau	1992–93	Oberliga Baden-Württemberg	33	5	—		33	5
VfB Gaggenau	Total		91	10	0	0	91	10
Stuttgarter Kickers	1993–94	2. Bundesliga	25	1	1	0	26	1
Stuttgarter Kickers	1994–95	Regionalliga Süd	31	9	3	1	34	10
Stuttgarter Kickers	1995–96	Regionalliga Süd	30	12	1	0	31	12
Stuttgarter Kickers	1996–97	2. Bundesliga	29	4	1	0	30	4
Stuttgarter Kickers	1997–98	2. Bundesliga	30	10	2	0	32	10
Stuttgarter Kickers	1998–99	2. Bundesliga	29	6	1	0	30	6
Stuttgarter Kickers	1999–2000	2. Bundesliga	31	4	6	8	37	12
Stuttgarter Kickers	Total		205	46	15	9	220	55
SSV Ulm	2000–01	2. Bundesliga	16	1	2	0	18	1
Eintracht Trier	2001–02	Regionalliga Süd	22	1	1	0	23	1
Eintracht Trier	2002–03	2. Bundesliga	26	3	1	0	27	3
Eintracht Trier	2003–04	2. Bundesliga	22	0	1	0	23	0
Eintracht Trier	Total		70	4	3	0	73	4
FC Nöttingen	2004–05	Regionalliga Süd	7	0	—		7	0
Career total			419	63	20	9	439	72

=== International ===
Appearances and goals by national team and year
National team	Year	Apps	Goals
Bosnia and Herzegovina	1998	1	0
Bosnia and Herzegovina	2000	1	0
Total		2	0
