= 2004 in association football =

The following are the association football events of the year 2004 throughout the world.

== Events ==
- 5 January – Manager Mark Wotte leaves Dutch club Willem II Tilburg and becomes technical director at Feyenoord Rotterdam.
- 29 January – Dutch club Volendam sacks manager Henk Wisman. Former player Johan Steur is named interim-manager.
- 2 February – South Korean Club Anyang Cheetahs move to Seoul and change their name to FC Seoul.
- 14 February – Tunisia beat Morocco 2–1 to clinch the first African Cup of Nations in the country's history.
- 29 February – Middlesbrough beat Bolton Wanderers 2–1 to win the League Cup, the club's first cup in their 128-year history.
- 17 March – Real Zaragoza beat Real Madrid in the Copa del Rey final 3-2 after extra time.
- 25 April – FA Premier League – Arsenal clinch the Premier League title, their second in three years, with four games still to play.
- 29 April – San Marino record their first ever win, a 1–0 victory over Liechtenstein in a friendly.
- 2 May – Milan clinch the Italian Serie A title.
- 8 May – Werder Bremen win the German Bundesliga
- 8 May – Valencia win the Spanish Primera División.
- 8 May – Ajax wins the Dutch title in the Eredivisie.
- 15 May – Arsenal complete their last game of the Premier League season with a victory, becoming the first team to go unbeaten for a whole season in the top division of English football since Preston North End in 1889. FIFA gives the host of the 2010 Football World Cup the first Football World Cup in Africa to South Africa
- 19 May – Valencia defeat Marseille 2–0 in the UEFA Cup final in Gothenburg, Sweden.
- 22 May – Manchester United win their record 11th FA Cup, defeating Millwall 3–0.
- 22 May – Millwall midfielder Curtis Weston, becomes the youngest FA Cup Final player in history at 17 years 119 days, beating the 125-year-old record of James F. M. Prinsep.
- 26 May – Porto defeat AS Monaco 3–0 in the UEFA Champions League final in Gelsenkirchen, Germany.
- 26 May – Darren Fletcher captains Scotland to a 1–0 win over Estonia, becoming the youngest Scottish captain in 100 years (aged 20 years, 114 days).
- 3 June – De Graafschap returns to the Dutch Eredivisie after a 3–2 win over Excelsior Rotterdam in the promotion/relegation play-offs.
- 26 June – River Plate win the Argentine Clausura League.
- 30 June – Santo André defeats Flamengo 4–2 on aggregate to clinch the Brazilian Cup.
- 1 July – Once Caldas (Colombia) defeats Boca Juniors (Argentina) 1–1 on aggregate, 2–0 on penalties to win the Copa Libertadores.
- 4 July – Greece win the UEFA Euro 2004 football tournament, defeating the host nation Portugal in a 1–0 upset victory.
- 25 July – Brazil win the Copa América football tournament, defeating Argentina 4–2 on penalties.
- 26 July – Gerard van der Lem is fired as manager of the Saudi Arabia national football team.
- 7 August – Japan win the 2004 Asian Cup football tournament, defeating China 3–1.
- 8 August – Utrecht wins the Johan Cruijff Schaal, the annual opening of the new season in the Eredivisie, for the first time by a 4–2 win over Ajax in the Amsterdam ArenA.
- 18 August – Marco van Basten makes his debut as the manager of Dutch national team with a 2–2 draw in the friendly against Sweden, replacing criticised Dick Advocaat. Four players make their debut: defender Jan Kromkamp (AZ) and strikers Romeo Castelen (Feyenoord Rotterdam), Dave van den Bergh (Utrecht) and Collins John (Fulham).
- 26 August – United States win the Olympic women's football tournament, defeating Brazil 2–1 in extra time.
- 28 August – Argentina win the Olympic men's football tournament, defeating Paraguay 1–0.
- 1 November – Football Federation Australia launches Australia's new national competition, the A-League, replacing the former National Soccer League.
- 10 December
  - Newell's Old Boys win the Argentine Apertura League.
  - Cienciano defeats Boca Juniors 4–2 on penalties to win the South American Recopa final in Fort Lauderdale, Florida, USA.
- 12 December – Porto defeats Once Caldas 8–7 on penalties in the Intercontinental Cup final in Yokohama, Japan.
- 13 December – Dutch club NEC fires manager Johan Neeskens. He is replaced by former player Cees Lok.
- 17 December – Boca Juniors defeats Bolívar 2–1 on aggregate to win the Copa Sudamericana final in Buenos Aires, Argentina.
- 19 December – Santos clinch the Brazilian League

== Winners of national club championships ==
=== Africa ===
- Angola – Aviação
- Egypt – Al-Zamalek
- Morocco – Raja Casablanca
- Mozambique – Ferroviário de Nampula
- Nigeria – Dolphins FC
- South Africa – Kaizer Chiefs Football Club
- Tunisia – Espérance Sportive de Tunis

=== Asia ===
- China – Shenzhen Jianlibao
- Hong Kong – Sun Hei
- India – East Bengal Club
- Indonesia – Persebaya Surabaya
- Iran – Pas Tehran
- Japan – Yokohama F. Marinos
- Malaysia – Pahang FA
- Pakistan – WAPDA
- Qatar – Al-Gharafa SC
- Saudi Arabia – Al-Shabab
- Singapore – Tampines Rovers FC
- South Korea – Suwon Samsung Bluewings
- Thailand – BEC Tero Sasana

=== Europe ===
- Albania – SK Tirana
- Andorra – Principat
- Armenia – Pyunik
- Austria – Grazer AK
- Azerbaijan – PFC Neftchi
- Belarus – Dinamo Minsk
- Belgium – Anderlecht
- Bosnia and Herzegovina – Široki Brijeg
- Bulgaria – Lokomotiv Plovdiv
- Croatia – Hajduk Split
- Cyprus – APOEL
- Czech Republic – Baník Ostrava
- Denmark – FC Copenhagen
- England – Arsenal
- Estonia – Levadia Tallinn
- Faroe Islands – HB Tórshavn
- Finland – Haka
- France – Lyon
- Georgia – WIT Georgia
- Germany – Werder Bremen
- Greece – Panathinaikos
- Hungary – Ferencváros
- Iceland – Fimleikafélag Hafnarfjarðar
- Republic of Ireland – Shelbourne
- Israel – Maccabi Haifa
- Italy – Milan
- Kazakhstan – Kairat Almaty
- Latvia – Skonto
- Lithuania – FBK Kaunas
- Luxembourg – Jeunesse Esch
- Macedonia – FK Pobeda
- Malta – Sliema Wanderers
- Moldova – Sheriff Tiraspol
- Netherlands – Ajax
- Northern Ireland – Linfield
- Norway – Rosenborg
- Poland – Wisła Kraków
- Portugal – Porto
- Romania – Dinamo București
- Russia – Lokomotiv Moscow
- San Marino – Pennarossa
- Scotland – Celtic
- Serbia and Montenegro – Red Star Belgrade
- Slovakia – MŠK Žilina
- Slovenia – ND Gorica
- Spain – Valencia
- Sweden – Malmö FF
- Switzerland – FC Basel
- Turkey – Fenerbahçe
- Ukraine – Dynamo Kyiv
- Wales – Rhyl

=== North America ===
- Canada – Toronto Croatia (CPSL)
- Costa Rica – Deportivo Saprissa
- Mexico
  - Clausura – UNAM
  - Apertura – UNAM
- United States – D.C. United (MLS)

=== Oceania ===
- Australia – Perth Glory

=== South America ===
- Argentina
  - 2003–04 Clausura – River Plate
  - 2004–05 Apertura – Newell's Old Boys
- Bolivia – Bolívar
  - Torneo Apertura – Bolívar
  - Torneo Clausura – Oriente Petrolero
- Brazil – Santos
- Chile
  - Torneo Apertura – Universidad de Chile
  - Torneo Clausura – Cobreloa
- Ecuador – Deportivo Cuenca
- Paraguay – Cerro Porteño
- Peru – Alianza Lima
- Uruguay – Danubio FC
- Venezuela – Caracas FC

== International tournaments ==
- African Cup of Nations in Tunisia (24 January – 14 February 2004)
  1. Tunisia
  2. Morocco
  3. Nigeria
- UEFA European Football Championship in Portugal (12 June – 4 July 2004)
  1. Greece
  2. Portugal
  3. Netherlands and Czech Republic
- Copa América in Peru (6–25 July 2004)
  1. Brazil
  2. Argentina
  3. Uruguay
- AFC Asian Cup in China (17 July – 7 August 2004)
  1. Japan
  2. China
  3. Iran
- Olympic Games in Greece (11 – 28 August 2004)
  - Men's Tournament
  1. Argentina
  2. Paraguay
  3. Italy
  - Women's Tournament
  1. United States
  2. Brazil
  3. Germany

== Births ==
- 19 January — Mohamed-Ali Cho, French youth international
- 23 January – Julio Enciso, Paraguayan international
- 4 April — Dilawar Ahmadzay, Afghan footballer
- 15 May — Gabriel Slonina, US youth international
- 1 June — Emirhan İlkhan, Turkish youth international
- 8 September — Nico Paz, Argentine youth international
- 19 October – Victor Udoh, Nigerian footballer (died 2026)
- 20 November – Youssoufa Moukoko, German youth international

== Deaths ==
=== January ===
- 3 January – T. G. Jones (87), Welsh footballer
- 5 January – Pierre Flamion (79), French footballer
- 7 January – Mario Zatelli (91), French footballer
- 24 January – Leonidas Da Silva, Brazilian striker, top scorer at the 1938 FIFA World Cup. (90)
- 25 January – Miklós Fehér (24), Hungarian footballer

=== February ===
- 1 February – Ally McLeod (72), Scottish footballer
- 11 February – Albeiro Usuriaga (37), Colombian footballer
- 21 February – John Charles (73), Welsh footballer
- 22 February – Roque Máspoli, Uruguayan goalkeeper, winner of the 1950 FIFA World Cup. (86)
- 25 February – Jacques Georges (87), French chief of the French Football Federation
- 29 February – Danny Ortiz (27), Guatemalan footballer

=== March ===
- 1 March – Augusto da Costa, Brazilian defender, captain and runner-up at the 1950 FIFA World Cup. (83)

=== April ===
- 5 April – Fernand Goyvaerts (65), Belgian footballer
- 20 April – Ronnie Simpson (74), Scottish footballer

=== May ===
- 14 May – Jesús Gil (71), Spanish chief of Atlético Madrid
- 15 May – Bruno Baião (18), Portuguese footballer, captain of the Benfica youth team
- 15 May – Henrique Frade, Brazilian striker, third highest goalscorer in the history of Clube de Regatas do Flamengo. (69)

=== July ===
- 10 July – Manuel Quaresma (49), general secretary of the Portuguese Football Federation
- 13 July – Roger Quenolle (79), French footballer
- 17 July – Lucien Leduc (85), French footballer
- 19 July – Carvalho Leite, Brazilian striker, youngest player and last Brazilian surviving member of the 1930 FIFA World Cup. (92)
- 23 July – Bertie Peacock (75), Northern Irish footballer

=== August ===
- 2 August – José Omar Pastoriza (62), Argentinian footballer

=== September ===
- 20 September – Brian Clough (69), English footballer and manager

=== October ===
- 6 October – Nikola Tsanev (65), Bulgarian footballer
- 7 October – Oscar Heisserer (90), French footballer
- 12 October – Jean Robin (83), French footballer
- 17 October – Andreas Sassen (36), German footballer
- 23 October – Bill Nicholson (85), English footballer and manager
- 27 October – Serginho (30), Brazilian footballer

=== November ===
- 6 November – Johnny Warren (61), Australian footballer and manager
- 9 November – Emlyn Hughes (57), English footballer

=== December ===
- 3 December – Raymond Goethals (83), Belgian footballer
- 5 December – Hicham Zerouali (27), Moroccan footballer
- 5 December – Cristiano Júnior (24), Brazilian footballer

== Clubs founded ==
- FC Ingolstadt 04
