= Jens Jeremies =

German footballer (born 1974)

- Jeremies with Bayern Munich in 2006

Personal information
- Date of birth: 5 March 1974 (age 52)
- Place of birth: Görlitz, East Germany
- Height: 1.77 m (5 ft 10 in)
- Position: Defensive midfielder

Youth career
- 1980–1986: Motor Görlitz
- 1986–1993: Dynamo Dresden

Senior career*
Years	Team	Apps	(Gls)
1993–1995	Dynamo Dresden	10	(1)
1995–1998	1860 Munich	78	(2)
1998–2006	Bayern Munich	160	(6)
Total		248	(9)

International career
1995	Germany U21	3	(1)
1997–2004	Germany	55	(1)
Medal record
Men's football
Representing Germany
FIFA World Cup
Runner-up	2002 Korea/Japan
- * Club domestic league appearances and goals

Jens Jeremies (born 5 March 1974) is a German former professional footballer who played as a defensive midfielder.

Best known for his tackling abilities, he played for three clubs during his professional career, most notably Bayern Munich where he won six Bundesliga titles, four DFB-Pokal trophies, and one Champions League title. He retired at the age of 32 following persistent injury problems.

Jeremies earned 55 caps for Germany, representing the nation in two World Cups and two European Championships. He started in the 2002 World Cup final, which Germany lost to Brazil.

== Club career ==
=== Beginnings and 1860 Munich ===
Born in Görlitz, East Germany, Jeremies joined the youth system of one of the most important clubs in the country, Dynamo Dresden, at the age of 12. As a professional, he appeared rarely over the course of two seasons, all the matches being played in 1994–95, his debut coming on 1 April 1995 in a 1–3 away loss against TSV 1860 München, as the team ended a four-year stay in the Bundesliga.

In 1995, Jeremies signed for 1860 Munich, helping the Lions qualify for the UEFA Cup in his second year and receiving totals of 30 yellow cards and two red during his three-year spell.

=== Bayern Munich ===
Jeremies moved to TSV's city neighbours FC Bayern Munich in the summer of 1998, the club for which he would play the remainder of his career. With the Bavarians he won all of his trophies, including six leagues and three domestic cups, adding the 2000–01 edition of the UEFA Champions League to which he contributed with 12 games and three goals, including one in the 2–1 semifinal win against Real Madrid (3–1 on aggregate) – he missed the final through suspension.

After only 20 matches combined in his last two years, mainly due to constant knee problems, Jeremies retired from football at the age of 32. He appeared in 251 German top division matches during 12 seasons, scoring nine times.

== International career ==
Whilst at TSV Munich, Jeremies made his debut for the Germany national team on 15 November 1997 in a friendly against South Africa, playing the full 90 minutes in a 3–0 win in Düsseldorf. He was then picked for the squad at the 1998 FIFA World Cup, appearing in three games in an eventual last-eight exit; during the competition, German entertainer Harald Schmidt reverentially called him "Jens Jerenaldo".

On 31 March 1999, Jeremies scored his first and only international goal, helping to a 2–0 home win against Finland for the UEFA Euro 2000 qualifiers, which was later chosen as Goal of the Month in Germany. However, he was dropped from the national team during the buildup to the finals, after calling the Erich Ribbeck-led side "pitiful".

Jeremies was reinstated for the 2002 World Cup, even captaining the team once in a friendly after the competition, but retired from international football after Germany's group stage exit in Euro 2004 in Portugal, saying he wanted to focus on his club duties with Bayern.

== Career statistics ==
=== Club ===
Club	Season	League			Cup		League Cup		Continental		Other		Total	
Club	Season	Division	Apps	Goals	Apps	Goals	Apps	Goals	Apps	Goals	Apps	Goals	Apps	Goals
Dynamo Dresden	1994–95	Bundesliga	10	1	0	0	—		—		—		10	1
1860 Munich	1995–96	Bundesliga	29	0	3	0	—		—		—		32	0
1860 Munich	1996–97	Bundesliga	27	2	1	0	—		—		—		28	2
1860 Munich	1997–98	Bundesliga	22	0	1	1	—		3	0	—		26	1
1860 Munich	Total		78	2	5	1	0	0	3	0	0	0	86	3
Bayern Munich	1998–99	Bundesliga	30	1	6	1	2	0	11	0	—		49	2
Bayern Munich	1999–2000	Bundesliga	30	3	4	1	0	0	10	0	—		44	4
Bayern Munich	2000–01	Bundesliga	21	1	1	0	1	0	12	3	—		35	4
Bayern Munich	2001–02	Bundesliga	10	0	4	1	0	0	6	1	0	0	20	2
Bayern Munich	2002–03	Bundesliga	29	0	4	0	0	0	7	1	—		40	1
Bayern Munich	2003–04	Bundesliga	23	1	2	0	1	0	4	0	—		30	1
Bayern Munich	2004–05	Bundesliga	7	0	2	0	2	0	1	0	—		12	0
Bayern Munich	2005–06	Bundesliga	13	0	4	0	0	0	1	0	—		18	0
Bayern Munich	Total		163	6	27	6	6	0	52	5	0	0	248	17
Career total			251	9	32	7	6	0	55	5	0	0	344	21

- 1.Includes 2001 Intercontinental Cup.

=== International goals ===
Scores and results list Germany's goal tally first.

#	Date	Venue	Opponent	Score	Result	Competition
1.	31 March 1999	Frankenstadion, Nuremberg, Germany	Finland	1–0	2–0	UEFA Euro 2000 qualifying

== Honours ==
Bayern Munich

- Bundesliga: 1998–99, 1999–2000, 2000–01, 2002–03, 2004–05, 2005–06
- DFB-Pokal: 1999–2000, 2002–03, 2004–05, 2005–06; runner-up: 1998–99
- DFB-Ligapokal: 1998, 2004
- UEFA Champions League: 2000–01; runner-up: 1998–99

Germany

- FIFA World Cup runner-up: 2002

Individual

- kicker Bundesliga Team of the Season: 1995–96, 1997–98, 1998–99

Orders

- Silbernes Lorbeerblatt: 2002
