= 1992–93 Austrian Cup =

Tournament details
- Country: Austria

Final positions
- Champions: Wacker Innsbruck
- Runners-up: Rapid Wien

The 1992–93 Austrian Cup (German: ÖFB-Cup) was the 59th season of Austria's nationwide football cup competition. The final was held at the Ernst-Happel-Stadion, Vienna on 19 June 1993.

The competition was won by Wacker Innsbruck after beating Rapid Wien 3–1.

== Second round ==
Team 1	Score	Team 2
11 September 1992
ASK-BSC Bruck/Leitha	1–2	SV Stockerau
SC Eisenstadt	0–1	SK Rapid Wien
SV Gols	3–0	SV Oberwart
12 September 1992
ASK Voitsberg	1–3	Austria Tabak Linz
ATSV Wolfsberg	0–7	FC Stahl Linz
SK Austria Klagenfurt	1–2	SV Ried
EPSV Gmünd	1–2	FC Admira Wacker Mödling
ESV Saalfelden	2–1	Salzburger AK 1914
FS Elektra Wien	1–4	1. SV Wr. Neudorf
FC Waidhofen/Ybbs	0–2	First Vienna FC
FC ÖMV Stadlau	1–4	VSE St. Pölten
SV Flavia Solva	3–0	Grazer AK
SC Fürstenfeld	3–1	DSV Leoben
FC Hard	2–4	WSG Wattens
SC Rheindorf Altach	3–2 (a.e.t.)	SV Hall
SC Zwettl	2–1	VfB Mödling
SK Altheim	1–1 (a.e.t.) (5–3 p)	SV Eibiswald
SK St. Magdalena	1–0	SAK Klagenfurt
SV Alpine Kindberg	0–4	Linzer ASK
SV Axams	2–3	Schwarz-Weiß Bregenz
SV Braunau	2–1	SV Spittal/Drau
SV Schwechat	0–2 (a.e.t.)	FK Austria Wien
SV Sigleß	0–2	SK Vorwärts Steyr
SV Wienerfeld	0–2	ASK Ybbs
SV Wörgl	0–2	FC Wacker Innsbruck
SVG Bleiburg	1–2	LUV Graz
TSV Hartberg	2–3 (a.e.t.)	Wiener Sport-Club
USK Anif	0–3	FC Puch
Union Esternberg	0–2	SV Austria Salzburg
Union St. Florian	1–4	SK Sturm Graz
13 September 1992
ASK Klingenbach	0–2	Kremser SC
Floridsdorfer AC	0–1	Favoritner AC

== Third round ==
Team 1	Score	Team 2
9 April 1993
1. SV Wiener Neudorf	0–1	SV Stockerau
10 April 1993
ASK Ybbs	0–3	Favoritner AC
Austria Tabak Linz	2–0	Kremser SC
ESV Saalfelden	2–6	FC Stahl Linz
FC Puch	1–3	WSG Wattens
SV Flavia Solva	0–0 (a.e.t.) (4–3 p)	Linzer ASK
LUV Graz	0–3	SK Sturm Graz
SC Fürstenfeld	3–2	SK Vorwärts Steyr
SC Rheindorf Altach	0–2	FC Wacker Innsbruck
SC Zwettl	0–5	First Vienna FC
SK Altheim	0–3	SK Rapid Wien
SK St. Magdalen	1–7	FK Austria Wien
SV Braunau	0–1	SV Ried
SV Gols	0–8	VSE St. Pölten
Schwarz-Weiß Bregenz	0–3	SV Austria Salzburg
Wiener Sport-Club	0–1	Admira/Wacker

== Fourth round ==
Team 1	Score	Team 2
30 April 1993
Admira/Wacker	4–1	SK Sturm Graz
1 May 1993
Austria Tabak Linz	0–4	WSG Wattens
FK Austria Wien	1–0	SV Austria Salzburg
FC Stahl Linz	3–2	SV Stockerau
SV Flavia Solva	1–1 (a.e.t.) (4–2 p)	VSE St. Pölten
SC Fürstenfeld	1–2	Favoritner AC
First Vienna FC	2–4 (a.e.t.)	SK Rapid Wien
FC Wacker Innsbruck	4–0	SV Ried

== Quarter-finals ==
Team 1	Score	Team 2
25 May 1993
Admira Wacker	2–0	FK Austria Wien
FC Stahl Linz	1–2	FC Wacker Innsbruck
SV Flavia Solva	0–2	SK Rapid Wien
WSG Wattens	1–4	Favoritner AC

== Semi-finals ==
Team 1	Score	Team 2
2 June 1993
SK Rapid Wien	2–1	Favoritner AC
FC Wacker Innsbruck	1–2	Admira Wacker

== Final ==
19 June 1993
16:30

SK Rapid Wien	1–3	FC Wacker Innsbruck
Fjørtoft 78'	Report	Lesiak 15'; Danek 46'; Baur 90+1'

Ernst-Happel-Stadion, Vienna
Attendance: 12,000
Referee: Alfred Wieser
