= 1997–98 Real Sociedad season =

Real Sociedad
1997–98 season
- President: Luis Uranga Otaegui
- Head coach: Bernd Krauss
- Stadium: Anoeta Stadium
- La Liga: 3rd
- Copa del Rey: Round of 16
- Top goalscorer: League: Darko Kovačević (17); All: Darko Kovačević (17)

The 1997–98 Real Sociedad season was the 88th season in the club's history and the 30th consecutive season in the top-flight of Spanish football league.

== Competitions ==
=== Overview ===
| Competition | First match | Last match | Starting round | Final position | Record | | | | | | | |
| Competition | First match | Last match | Starting round | Final position | Pld | W | D | L | GF | GA | GD | Win % |
|---|---|---|---|---|---|---|---|---|---|---|---|---|
| La Liga | 30 August 1997 | 16 May 1998 | Matchday 1 | 3rd | 38 | 16 | 15 | 7 | 60 | 36 | +24 | 42.11 |
| Copa del Rey | 7 October 1997 | 21 January 1997 | Second round | Round of 16 | 4 | 2 | 1 | 1 | 7 | 6 | +1 | 50.00 |
| Total | | | | | 42 | 18 | 16 | 8 | 67 | 42 | +25 | 42.86 |

Source: BDFutbol

=== La Liga ===
==== League table ====
| Pos | Team | Pld | W | D | L | GF | GA | GD | Pts | Qualification or relegation |
|---|---|---|---|---|---|---|---|---|---|---|
| 1 | Barcelona (C) | 38 | 23 | 5 | 10 | 78 | 56 | +22 | 74 | Qualification for the Champions League group stage |
| 2 | Athletic Bilbao | 38 | 17 | 14 | 7 | 52 | 42 | +10 | 65 | Qualification for the Champions League second qualifying round |
| 3 | Real Sociedad | 38 | 16 | 15 | 7 | 60 | 37 | +23 | 63 (Note: RMA 2–0 RSO; RSO 4–2 RMA) | Qualification for the UEFA Cup first round |
| 4 | Real Madrid | 38 | 17 | 12 | 9 | 63 | 45 | +18 | 63 | Qualification for the Champions League group stage (Note: Real Madrid was qualified directly for the 1998–99 UEFA Champions League as holders.) |
| 5 | Mallorca | 38 | 16 | 12 | 10 | 55 | 39 | +16 | 60 (Note: MLL: 9 pts; CEL: 5 pts; ATM: 2 pts) | Qualification for the Cup Winners' Cup first round (Note: Since Barcelona, winners of 1997–98 Copa del Rey, was qualified for the 1998–99 UEFA Champions League, losing cup finalists RCD Mallorca earned a spot in the first round of the 1998–99 UEFA Cup Winners' Cup.) |

Source: LFP
Rules for classification: 1) points; 2) head-to-head points; 3) head-to-head goal difference; 4) head-to-head goals scored; 5) goal difference; 6) number of goals scored.
(C) Champions

==== Results summary ====
| Overall | | | | | | | | Home | | | | | | Away | | | | | |
| Pld | W | D | L | GF | GA | GD | Pts | W | D | L | GF | GA | GD | W | D | L | GF | GA | GD |
|---|---|---|---|---|---|---|---|---|---|---|---|---|---|---|---|---|---|---|---|
| 38 | 16 | 15 | 7 | 60 | 37 | +23 | 63 | 10 | 8 | 1 | 33 | 16 | +17 | 6 | 7 | 6 | 27 | 21 | +6 |

Source: BDFutbol

==== Results by round ====
| Round | 1 |
|---|---|
| Ground | |
| Result | |
| Position | |

Source: BDFutbol
A = Away; H = Home; W = Win; D = Draw; L = Loss

==== Matches ====
| 31 August 1997 1 | Barcelona | 3–0 | Real Sociedad | Barcelona |
| CEST (UTC+2) | Rivaldo 26', 80'; Giovanni 56' | | | Stadium: Camp Nou |

| 7 September 1997 2 | Real Sociedad | 1–0 | Racing Santander | San Sebastián |
| CEST (UTC+2) | Pascual 44' | | | Stadium: Anoeta |

| 13 September 1997 3 | Real Madrid | 2–0 | Real Sociedad | Madrid |
| CEST (UTC+2) | Šuker 28'; Raúl 55' | | | Stadium: Santiago Bernabéu |

| 27 September 1997 4 | Real Sociedad | 3–0 | Valladolid | San Sebastián |
| CEST (UTC+2) | Kovačević 20'; De Paula 55'; Loren 70' | | | Stadium: Anoeta |

| 4 October 1997 5 | Athletic Bilbao | 1–1 | Real Sociedad | Bilbao |
| CEST (UTC+2) | | | | Stadium: San Mamés |

| 15 October 1997 6 | Real Sociedad | 2–1 | Celta Vigo | San Sebastián |
| CEST (UTC+2) | | | | Stadium: Anoeta |

| 19 October 1997 7 | Oviedo | 0–5 | Real Sociedad | Oviedo |
| CEST (UTC+2) | | | | Stadium: Carlos Tartiere |

| 26 October 1997 8 | Real Sociedad | 2–1 | Mérida | San Sebastián |
| CET (UTC+1) | | | | Stadium: Anoeta |

| 2 November 1997 9 | Zaragoza | 0–0 | Real Sociedad | Zaragoza |
| CET (UTC+1) | | | | Stadium: La Romareda |

| 9 November 1997 10 | Real Sociedad | 2–0 | Espanyol | San Sebastián |
| CET (UTC+1) | | | | Stadium: Anoeta |

| 12 November 1997 11 | Real Betis | 0–0 | Real Sociedad | Seville |
| CET (UTC+1) | | | | Stadium: Benito Villamarín |

| 15 November 1997 12 | Real Sociedad | 0–0 | Atlético Madrid | San Sebastián |
| CET (UTC+1) | | | | Stadium: Anoeta |

| 23 November 1997 13 | Salamanca | 0–0 | Real Sociedad | Villares de la Reina |
| CET (UTC+1) | | | | Stadium: Helmántico |

| 30 November 1997 14 | Real Sociedad | 5–1 | Compostela | San Sebastián |
| CET (UTC+1) | | | | Stadium: Anoeta |

| 1 December 1997 15 | Real Sociedad | 1–1 | Valencia | San Sebastián |
| CET (UTC+1) | | | | Stadium: Anoeta |

| 14 December 1997 16 | Deportivo La Coruña | 1–1 | Real Sociedad | A Coruña |
| CET (UTC+1) | | | | Stadium: Riazor |

| 17 December 1997 17 | Real Sociedad | 2–1 | Sporting Gijón | San Sebastián |
| CET (UTC+1) | | | | Stadium: Anoeta |

| 21 December 1997 18 | Tenerife | 0–0 | Real Sociedad | Santa Cruz de Tenerife |
| CET (UTC+1) | | | | Stadium: Heliodoro Rodríguez López |

| 4 January 1998 19 | Real Sociedad | 1–0 | Mallorca | San Sebastián |
| CET (UTC+1) | | | | Stadium: Anoeta |

| 11 January 1998 20 | Real Sociedad | 2–2 | Barcelona | San Sebastián |
| CET (UTC+1) | | | | Stadium: Anoeta |

| 18 January 1998 21 | Racing Santander | 3–1 | Real Sociedad | Santander |
| CET (UTC+1) | | | | Stadium: El Sardinero |

| 25 January 1998 22 | Real Sociedad | 4–2 | Real Madrid | San Sebastián |
| CET (UTC+1) | | | | Stadium: Anoeta |

| 1 February 1998 23 | Valladolid | 0–4 | Real Sociedad | Valladolid |
| CET (UTC+1) | | | | Stadium: José Zorrilla |

| 7 February 1998 24 | Real Sociedad | 1–1 | Athletic Bilbao | San Sebastián |
| CET (UTC+1) | | | | Stadium: Anoeta |

| 15 February 1998 25 | Celta Vigo | 2–1 | Real Sociedad | Vigo |
| CET (UTC+1) | | | | Stadium: Balaídos |

| 22 February 1998 26 | Real Sociedad | 2–2 | Oviedo | San Sebastián |
| CET (UTC+1) | | | | Stadium: Anoeta |

| 1 March 1998 27 | Mérida | 3–1 | Real Sociedad | Mérida |
| CET (UTC+1) | | | | Stadium: Estadio Romano |

| 8 March 1998 28 | Real Sociedad | 0–1 | Zaragoza | San Sebastián |
| CET (UTC+1) | | | | Stadium: Anoeta |

| 15 March 1998 29 | Espanyol | 0–3 | Real Sociedad | Barcelona |
| CET (UTC+1) | | | | Stadium: Estadi Olímpic Lluís Companys |

| 22 March 1998 30 | Real Sociedad | 2–0 | Real Betis | San Sebastián |
| CET (UTC+1) | | | | Stadium: Anoeta |

| 28 March 1998 31 | Atlético Madrid | 2–2 | Real Sociedad | Madrid |
| CET (UTC+1) | | | | Stadium: Vicente Calderón |

| 5 April 1998 32 | Real Sociedad | 1–1 | Salamanca | San Sebastián |
| CEST (UTC+2) | | | | Stadium: Anoeta |

| 12 April 1998 33 | Compostela | 1–3 | Real Sociedad | Santiago de Compostela |
| CEST (UTC+2) | | | | Stadium: Multiusos de San Lázaro |

| 18 April 1998 34 | Valencia | 3–2 | Real Sociedad | Valencia |
| CEST (UTC+2) | | | | Stadium: Mestalla |

| 27 April 1998 35 | Real Sociedad | 1–1 | Deportivo La Coruña | San Sebastián |
| CEST (UTC+2) | | | | Stadium: Anoeta |

| 3 May 1998 36 | Sporting Gijón | 0–2 | Real Sociedad | Gijón |
| CEST (UTC+2) | | | | Stadium: El Molinón |

| 10 May 1998 37 | Real Sociedad | 1–1 | Tenerife | San Sebastián |
| CEST (UTC+2) | | | | Stadium: Anoeta |

| 15 May 1998 38 | Mallorca | 0–1 | Real Sociedad | Palma |
| CEST (UTC+2) | | | | Stadium: Lluís Sitjar |

== Statistics ==
=== Goalscorers ===
| Rank | No. | Pos | Nat | Name | La Liga | Copa del Rey | Total |
|---|---|---|---|---|---|---|---|
| 1 | 9 | FW | (Federal Republic of Yugoslavia) | Darko Kovačević | 17 | 0 | 17 |
| 2 | 8 | FW | (Romania) | Gheorghe Craioveanu | 7 | 0 | 7 |
| 3 | 21 | FW | (Spain) | Óscar de Paula | 6 | 0 | 6 |
| Totals | | | | | 60 | 7 | 67 |
