= 2000–01 SC Freiburg season =

SC Freiburg
2000–01 season
- President: Achim Stocker
- Head coach: Volker Finke
- Bundesliga: 6th
- DFB-Pokal: Quarter-finals
- Top goalscorer: League: Adel Sellimi (10); All: Adel Sellimi (11)
- Average home league attendance: 24,882

The 2000–01 season was the 96th season in the existence of SC Freiburg and the club's third consecutive season in the top flight of German football. In addition to the domestic league, SC Freiburg participated in this season's edition of the DFB-Pokal. The season covered the period from 1 July 2000 to 30 June 2001.

== Competitions ==
=== Overview ===
Competition	First match	Last match	Starting round	Final position	Record							
Competition	First match	Last match	Starting round	Final position	Pld	W	D	L	GF	GA	GD	Win %
Bundesliga	12 August 2000	19 May 2001	Matchday 1	6th	34	15	10	9	54	37	+17	44.12
DFB-Pokal	27 August 2000	20 December 2000	First round	Quarter-finals	4	3	0	1	8	5	+3	75.00
Total					38	18	10	10	62	42	+20	47.37

Source: Soccerway

=== Bundesliga ===
==== League table ====
Pos	Team	Pld	W	D	L	GF	GA	GD	Pts	Qualification or relegation
4	Bayer Leverkusen	34	17	6	11	54	40	+14	57	Qualification to Champions League third qualifying round
5	Hertha BSC	34	18	2	14	58	52	+6	56	Qualification to UEFA Cup first round
6	SC Freiburg	34	15	10	9	54	37	+17	55	Qualification to UEFA Cup first round
7	Werder Bremen	34	15	8	11	53	48	+5	53	Qualification to Intertoto Cup third round
8	1. FC Kaiserslautern	34	15	5	14	49	54	−5	50	

Source: www.dfb.de
Rules for classification: 1) points; 2) goal difference; 3) number of goals scored.

==== Results summary ====
Overall								Home						Away					
Pld	W	D	L	GF	GA	GD	Pts	W	D	L	GF	GA	GD	W	D	L	GF	GA	GD
34	15	10	9	54	37	+17	55	9	5	3	36	15	+21	6	5	6	18	22	−4

Source: DFB

==== Results by round ====
Round	1	2	3	4	5	6	7	8	9	10	11	12	13	14	15	16	17	18	19	20	21	22	23	24	25	26	27	28	29	30	31	32	33	34
Ground	H	A	H	A	H	A	H	A	H	A	A	H	A	H	A	H	A	A	H	A	H	A	H	A	H	A	H	H	A	H	A	H	A	H
Result	W	D	D	D	W	L	L	L	W	L	L	L	W	D	D	W	W	D	W	W	D	W	L	L	D	D	W	D	W	W	L	W	W	W
Position																																		

Source: DFB
A = Away; H = Home; W = Win; D = Draw; L = Loss

==== Matches ====
12 August 2000 1	SC Freiburg	4–0	VfB Stuttgart
CEST (UTC+2)

19 August 2000 2	SpVgg Unterhaching	1–1	SC Freiburg
CEST (UTC+2)

5 September 2000 3	SC Freiburg	0–0	1. FC Köln
CEST (UTC+2)

10 September 2000 4	Hansa Rostock	0–0	SC Freiburg
CEST (UTC+2)

16 September 2000 5	SC Freiburg	4–1	Energie Cottbus
CEST (UTC+2)

22 September 2000 6	1860 Munich	3–1	SC Freiburg
CEST (UTC+2)

1 October 2000 7	SC Freiburg	0–1	Werder Bremen
CEST (UTC+2)

13 October 2000 8	Borussia Dortmund	1–0	SC Freiburg
CEST (UTC+2)

22 October 2000 9	SC Freiburg	3–1	Schalke 04
CEST (UTC+2)

28 October 2000 10	Eintracht Frankfurt	3–0	SC Freiburg
CEST (UTC+2)

4 November 2000 11	Hamburger SV	5–0	SC Freiburg
CEST (UTC+2)

11 November 2000 12	SC Freiburg	0–1	Bayer Leverkusen
CEST (UTC+2)

18 November 2000 13	1. FC Kaiserslautern	0–2	SC Freiburg
CEST (UTC+2)

25 November 2000 14	SC Freiburg	1–1	Bayern Munich
CEST (UTC+2)

2 December 2000 15	Hertha BSC	2–2	SC Freiburg
CEST (UTC+2)

9 December 2000 16	SC Freiburg	5–0	VfL Bochum
CEST (UTC+2)

12 December 2000 17	VfL Wolfsburg	1–2	SC Freiburg
CEST (UTC+2)

16 December 2000 18	VfB Stuttgart	0–0	SC Freiburg
CEST (UTC+2)

27 January 2001 19	SC Freiburg	2–0	SpVgg Unterhaching
CEST (UTC+2)

3 February 2001 20	1. FC Köln	0–1	SC Freiburg
CEST (UTC+2)

11 February 2001 21	SC Freiburg	0–0	Hansa Rostock
CEST (UTC+2)

17 February 2001 22	Energie Cottbus	0–2	SC Freiburg
CEST (UTC+2)

24 February 2001 23	SC Freiburg	0–3	1860 Munich
CEST (UTC+2)

3 March 2001 24	Werder Bremen	3–1	SC Freiburg
CEST (UTC+2)

10 March 2001 25	SC Freiburg	2–2	Borussia Dortmund
CEST (UTC+2)

17 March 2001 26	Schalke 04	0–0	SC Freiburg
CEST (UTC+2)

31 March 2001 27	SC Freiburg	5–2	Eintracht Frankfurt
CEST (UTC+2)

7 April 2001 28	SC Freiburg	0–0	Hamburger SV
CEST (UTC+2)

14 April 2001 29	Bayer Leverkusen	1–3	SC Freiburg
CEST (UTC+2)

22 April 2001 30	SC Freiburg	5–2	1. FC Kaiserslautern
CEST (UTC+2)

28 April 2001 31	Bayern Munich	1–0	SC Freiburg
CEST (UTC+2)

6 May 2001 32	SC Freiburg	1–0	Hertha BSC
CEST (UTC+2)

12 May 2001 33	VfL Bochum	1–3	SC Freiburg
CEST (UTC+2)

19 May 2001 34	SC Freiburg	4–1	VfL Wolfsburg
CEST (UTC+2)

=== DFB-Pokal ===
27 August 2000 First round	SC Pfullendorf	1–3	SC Freiburg	Pfullendorf
--:-- CEST (UTC+2)				Attendance: 6,400; Referee: Hermann Albrecht

31 October 2000 Second round	SC Freiburg	1–0	Werder Bremen	Freiburg
--:-- CEST (UTC+2)				Stadium: Dreisamstadion; Attendance: 10,000; Referee: Jürgen Aust

29 November 2000 Round of 16	SC Freiburg	3–2	Bayer Leverkusen	Freiburg
--:-- CEST (UTC+2)				Stadium: Dreisamstadion; Attendance: 18,000; Referee: Alfons Berg

20 December 2000 Quarter-finals	VfB Stuttgart	2–1 (a.e.t.)	SC Freiburg	Stuttgart
--:-- CET (UTC+1)				Attendance: 13,000; Referee: Jürgen Jansen
