= Janosch Dziwior =

German footballer and coach

Personal information
- Date of birth: 19 September 1974 (age 52)
- Place of birth: Knurów, Poland
- Height: 1.82 m (6 ft 0 in)
- Position: Defender

Youth career
- Carbo Gliwice
- SV Huchem-Stammeln

Senior career*
Years	Team	Apps	(Gls)
1994–1997	1. FC Köln	33	(3)
1997–1999	FC Gütersloh	62	(2)
1999–2002	1. FC Köln	60	(1)
2002–2003	Eintracht Braunschweig	29	(1)
2003	Fortuna Düsseldorf	1	(0)
2004–2005	KFC Uerdingen 05	4	(0)
2005–2006	SC Jülich 1910		

Managerial career
- 2006–2007: Fortuna Düsseldorf II (assistant)
- * Club domestic league appearances and goals

Janosch Dziwior (Polish: Janusz Dziwior; born 19 September 1974) is a German football coach and former player.

== Career ==
Dziwior was born in Knurów, Poland. He made his debut on the professional league level in the Bundesliga for 1. FC Köln on 17 February 1995 when he started in a game against Eintracht Frankfurt.
