= Achim Stocker =

German football club president

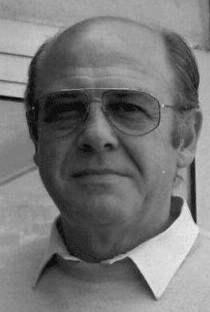
- Achim Stocker, President of the SC Freiburg
- Born: 27 May 1935; Konstanz, Germany
- Died: 1 November 2009 (aged 74); Freiburg im Breisgau, Germany
- Occupation: Former President of SC Freiburg

Achim Stocker (27 May 1935 – 1 November 2009) was the president of German football club SC Freiburg.

== Biography ==
He worked 37 years as the chairman of SC Freiburg since 1972 and was the oldest and longest serving president in professional German football.

== Death ==
Stocker died on 1 November 2009 of a heart attack.

== Personal life ==
He was Cabinet director in Pension (Head director of finances) and leaves behind his wife Hanne with his son Christian and daughter Sabine.
