= Teodor Rus =

Romanian footballer and manager

Personal information
- Full name: Teodor Cristian Rus
- Date of birth: 30 April 1974 (age 52)
- Place of birth: Aiud, Romania
- Height: 1.82 m (6 ft 0 in)
- Position: Midfielder

Youth career
- Metalul Aiud

Senior career*
Years	Team	Apps	(Gls)
1992–1993	Gloria Bistrița		
1993–1997	FC 08 Homburg	91	(8)
1997–2000	Rot-Weiß Oberhausen	66	(1)
2000–2002	Karlsruher SC	61	(1)
2002–2003	SV Waldhof Mannheim	12	(0)
2003	FC Rot-Weiß Erfurt	0	(0)
2005–2006	1. FC Eschborn	32	(1)
2006–2008	FC Nöttingen	57	(7)
2008–2010	TSV Grunbach		

Managerial career
- 2012–2013: TSV Grunbach (assistant)
- 2013–2017: 1. CfR Pforzheim
- 2018–2019: SSV Reutlingen 05
- * Club domestic league appearances and goals

Teodor Cristian Rus (born 30 April 1974) is a Romanian former football midfielder and current manager.
