= Thomas Hoßmang =

German footballer and manager

Personal information
- Date of birth: 27 November 1966 (age 59)
- Place of birth: Hoyerswerda, East Germany
- Height: 1.83 m (6 ft 0 in)
- Position: Defender

Senior career*
Years	Team	Apps	(Gls)
1984–1985	Aktivist Schwarze Pumpe	23	(5)
1985–1986	Energie Cottbus	16	(1)
1986–1990	Aktivist Schwarze Pumpe	97	(12)
1990–1991	Terengganu FA		
1991–1994	Rot-Weiß Frankfurt		
1994–1996	Dynamo Dresden	47	(2)
1996–1999	Energie Cottbus	90	(6)
1999–2003	Dresdner SC	136	(1)
2008	FC Lausitz Hoyerswerda		

Managerial career
- 2009–2011: Budissa Bautzen
- 2011–2012: VFC Plauen
- 2020–2021: 1. FC Magdeburg
- * Club domestic league appearances and goals

Thomas Hoßmang (born 27 November 1966) is a German former footballer and manager, who last coached 1. FC Magdeburg.
