= Andrzej Lesiak =

Polish footballer and coach

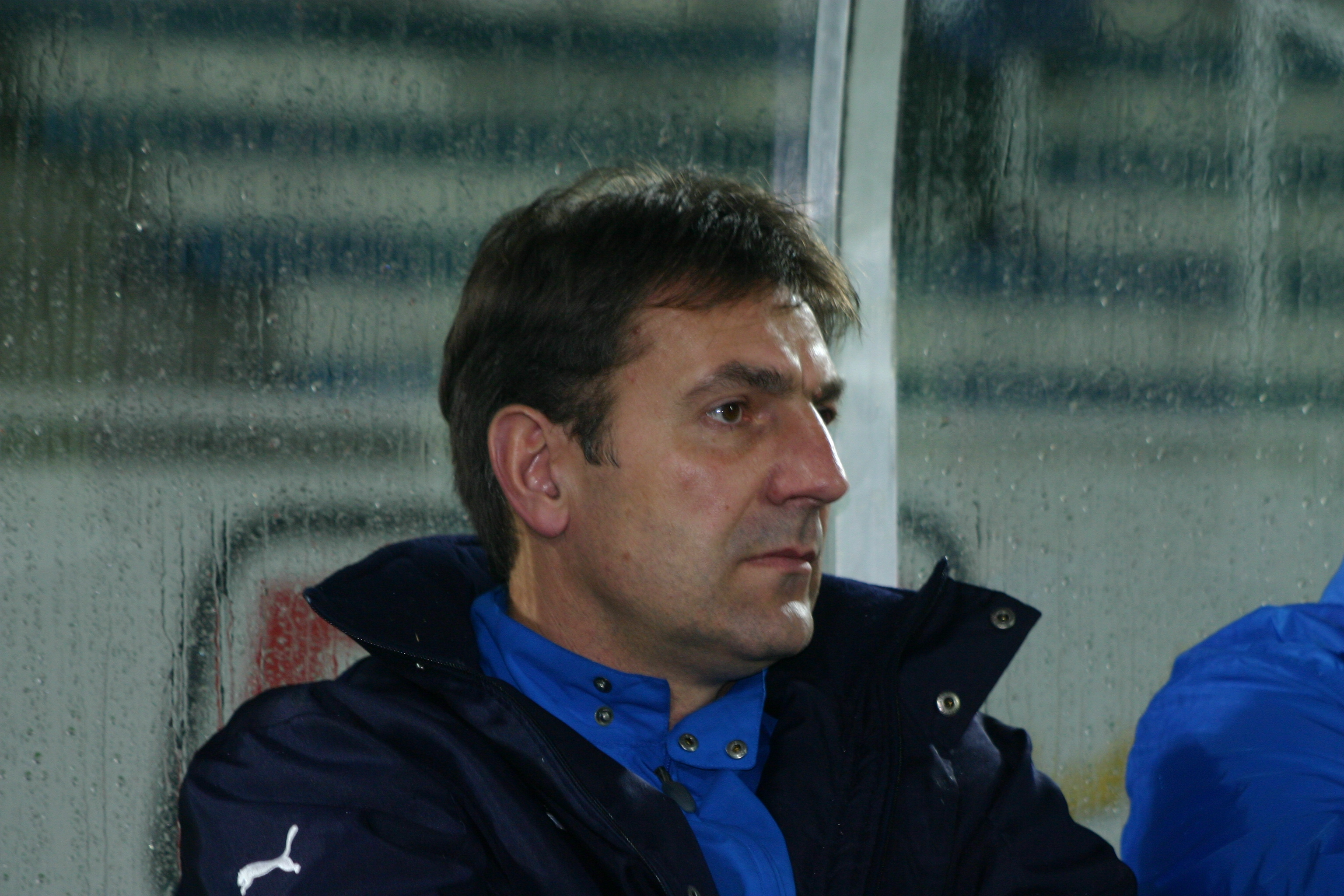
- Lesiak with FC Vöcklabruck in 2008

Personal information
- Date of birth: 21 May 1966 (age 60)
- Place of birth: Nowogród Bobrzański, Poland
- Height: 1.91 m (6 ft 3 in)
- Position: Defender

Youth career
- Sparta Grabik
- Fadom Nowogród Bobrzański

Senior career*
Years	Team	Apps	(Gls)
1985–1992	GKS Katowice	117	(7)
1992–1993	Wacker Innsbruck	31	(3)
1993–1994	Tirol Innsbruck	32	(1)
1994–1995	Dynamo Dresden	30	(2)
1995–1996	Ried	30	(6)
1996–1997	Rapid Wien	31	(4)
1997–1998	Austria Salzburg	13	(1)
1998–1999	Rapid Wien	0	(0)
1999–2001	Ried	51	(1)
2001–2002	ASKÖ Pasching	33	(2)
2002–2003	Ried	21	(0)

International career
1990–1993	Poland	18	(1)

Managerial career
- 2002: Ried II (interim)
- 2003: Ried II
- 2003–2004: Ried
- 2004–2005: SC Schwanenstadt
- 2006–2007: TSV Hartberg
- 2007–2008: GKS Bełchatów II
- 2008–2009: Vöcklabrucker SC
- 2009: Zagłębie Lubin
- 2011: Union Gurten
- * Club domestic league appearances and goals

Andrzej Lesiak (born 21 May 1966) is a Polish professional football manager and former player.

== Honours ==
=== Player ===
GKS Katowice

- Polish Cup: 1990–91
- Polish Super Cup: 1991

Wacker Innsbruck:

- Austrian Cup: 1992–93
