= Sven Ratke =

German footballer

Personal information
- Date of birth: 3 January 1972 (age 54)
- Place of birth: Görlitz, East Germany
- Height: 1.72 m (5 ft 7 1/2 in)
- Position: Attacking midfielder

Youth career
- Dynamo Görlitz
- –1984: BSG Motor Niesky
- 1984–1989: Dynamo Dresden

Senior career*
Years	Team	Apps	(Gls)
1989–1995	Dynamo Dresden	75	(2)
1995–1996	SV Lurup	16	(2)
1996–1998	VfL Wolfsburg	41	(6)
1998–1999	VfB Hellerau-Klotzsche		
1999–2002	Dresdner SC	72	(8)
2002–2004	Dynamo Dresden	33	(0)
Total		257	(18)

International career
	East Germany Olympic	2	(2)
Medal record
Dynamo Dresden
Winner	DDR-Oberliga	1990
Winner	FDGB Pokal	1990
- * Club domestic league appearances and goals

Sven Ratke (born 3 January 1972 in Görlitz) is a German former footballer who played as an attacking midfielder.

== Career ==
Ratke began his career with Dynamo Dresden, making his debut in the 1989–90 season, in which the club won the League and Cup double, with Ratke coming on as a substitute for Matthias Döschner in the cup final. After reunification, Dynamo qualified for the Bundesliga, where they played for four seasons, and Ratke played in each one, a total of 48 appearances (one goal). After Dynamo's relegation in 1995, Ratke left the club, joining ambitious Hamburg club SV Lurup, where he spent half a season before signing for VfL Wolfsburg of the 2. Bundesliga. Wolfsburg were promoted to the Bundesliga in Ratke's second season with the club, and he made 13 appearances at this level, before leaving in 1998.

Ratke then returned to Dresden, spending a season in amateur football, with VfB Hellerau-Klotzsche, before signing for Dresdner SC, who were at this point the top club in the city, finishing second in the Regionalliga Nordost, while Dynamo were relegated to the NOFV-Oberliga. In 2002, Dynamo returned to the third tier (now the Regionalliga Nord), and Ratke returned to the club, where he spent two seasons before retiring in 2004, having helped the club earn promotion to the 2. Bundesliga.
