= Guido Erhard =

German footballer (1969–2002)

Personal information
- Date of birth: 6 October 1969
- Place of birth: Klingenstein, Germany
- Date of death: 21 February 2002 (aged 32)
- Place of death: Offenbach, Germany
- Height: 1.82 m (6 ft 0 in)
- Position: Forward

Senior career*
Years	Team	Apps	(Gls)
1988–1990	Kickers Offenbach		
1990–1995	1860 Munich		
1995–1996	VfL Wolfsburg	41	(2)
1996–1998	Mainz 05	27	(4)
- * Club domestic league appearances and goals

Guido Erhard (6 October 1969 – 21 February 2002) was a German professional footballer who played as a forward. In 2002, he died by suicide at the Offenbach train station.
