= Michael Spies =

German footballer

Personal information
- Full name: Michael Spies
- Date of birth: 9 July 1965 (age 61)
- Place of birth: Stuttgart, West Germany
- Height: 1.80 m (5 ft 11 in)
- Position: Attacking midfielder

Youth career
- –1983: Stuttgarter Kickers

Senior career*
Years	Team	Apps	(Gls)
1983–1986	VfB Stuttgart II	70	(22)
1985–1987	VfB Stuttgart	5	(1)
1987	SSV Ulm	17	(5)
1987–1989	Karlsruher SC	63	(15)
1989–1991	Borussia Mönchengladbach	38	(6)
1991–1992	Hansa Rostock	38	(13)
1992–1994	Hamburger SV	23	(3)
1994–1995	Dynamo Dresden	30	(6)
1995–1998	VfL Wolfsburg	75	(10)
1998–2000	SpVgg Unterhaching	3	(0)
2000–2001	VfB Lübeck	2	(0)
Total		364	(81)
- * Club domestic league appearances and goals

Michael Spies (born 9 July 1965) is a German former professional footballer who played as an attacking midfielder. He has the distinction of being one of only two players to have represented seven different Bundesliga clubs. He is now a player agent.

== Honours ==
- DFB-Pokal finalist: 1986
