= Thomas Vogel (footballer, born 1967) =

German footballer

Personal information
- Date of birth: March 1, 1967 (age 59)
- Place of birth: Hanover, West Germany
- Height: 1.88 m (6 ft 2 in)
- Positions: Defender; midfielder

Senior career*
Years	Team	Apps	(Gls)
1990–1992	TSV Havelse	22	(2)
1992–1997	SC Freiburg	111	(1)
1997–1999	Hamburger SV	17	(0)
1999–2000	Borussia Mönchengladbach	3	(0)
2000	VfR Mannheim	7	(1)
2001	Lüneburger SK	17	(0)
Total		177	(4)
- * Club domestic league appearances and goals

Thomas Vogel (born March 1, 1967, in Hanover) is a German former professional footballer who played as a defender or midfielder.

== Honours ==
- Bundesliga third place: 1995
