= Andreas Sassen =

German footballer (1968–2004)

Personal information
- Date of birth: 14 January 1968
- Place of birth: Essen, West Germany
- Date of death: 17 October 2004 (aged 36)
- Place of death: Essen, Germany
- Height: 1.84 m (6 ft 0 in)
- Position: Midfielder

Youth career
- Schwarz-Weiss Essen

Senior career*
Years	Team	Apps	(Gls)
1988–1990	Schwarz-Weiss Essen		
1991–1993	Bayer Uerdingen	66	(12)
1993–1994	Hamburger SV	38	(1)
1994–1995	Dynamo Dresden	6	(0)
1995	Dnipro Dnipropetrovsk	11	(0)
1996	SG Wattenscheid 09	10	(1)
1996–1997	Schwarz-Weiss Essen		
- * Club domestic league appearances and goals

Andreas Sassen (14 January 1968 – 17 October 2004) was a German professional footballer who played as a midfielder. He suffered from alcoholism and died from a stroke.
