= Marco Weißhaupt =

German footballer

Personal information
- Date of birth: 24 June 1972 (age 54)
- Place of birth: Erfurt, East Germany
- Height: 1.80 m (5 ft 11 in)
- Position: Attacking midfielder

Youth career
- 1978–1986: Motor Nordhausen
- 1986–1989: Rot-Weiß Erfurt

Senior career*
Years	Team	Apps	(Gls)
1989–1992	Motor Nordhausen		
1992–1994	Rot-Weiß Erfurt	60	(16)
1994–1996	Hamburger SV	13	(0)
1996	Mainz 05	12	(2)
1996–1997	Rot-Weiß Erfurt	32	(21)
1997–2001	SC Freiburg	112	(25)
2001–2002	Hansa Rostock	9	(0)
2002–2004	VfB Lübeck	29	(4)
2004	Sportfreunde Siegen	14	(1)
- * Club domestic league appearances and goals

Marco Weißhaupt (born 24 June 1972) is a German former professional footballer who played as an attacking midfielder.
