= Matthias Stammann =

German footballer and coach

Personal information
- Date of birth: 8 May 1968 (age 58)
- Place of birth: Schwerin, East Germany
- Position: Midfielder

Team information
- Current team: VfL Wolfsburg (Youth Coach)

Senior career*
Years	Team	Apps	(Gls)
1985–1990	Dynamo Schwerin	154	(24)
1990–1994	Bayer Leverkusen	41	(1)
1994	→ Fortuna Köln (loan)	15	(1)
1994–1995	Dynamo Dresden	15	(0)
1995–1999	VfL Wolfsburg	74	(7)
Total		299	(33)
- * Club domestic league appearances and goals

Matthias Stammann (born 8 May 1968) is a German former professional footballer who played as a midfielder.
