= Stefan Müller (footballer, born 1974) =

German footballer

Personal information
- Date of birth: 8 March 1974 (age 52)
- Place of birth: Schopfheim, West Germany
- Height: 1.84 m (6 ft 0 in)
- Position: Defender

Youth career
- FC Wehr
- –1992: SV Schopfheim
- 1992–1993: SG Lörrach-Stetten

Senior career*
Years	Team	Apps	(Gls)
1993–2005	SC Freiburg	203	(12)
Total		203	(12)

International career
1994–1996	Germany U-21	6	(0)
- * Club domestic league appearances and goals

Stefan Müller (born 8 March 1974) is a German former professional footballer who played as a defender. He spent his entire career with SC Freiburg.

== Career ==
Born in Schopfheim, Müller joined SC Freiburg in 1993, and making his debut the following season as the club went on to finish third in the Bundesliga. He played a further ten seasons for the club, eight of which were at the highest level – Freiburg were relegated in 1997 and 2002, but bounced back immediately on both occasions. In total he made 203 league appearances for the club, scoring 12 times before retiring in 2005. He won six caps for Germany under-21 team in the mid-1990s.
