= Sascha Licht =

German footballer

Personal information
- Full name: Sascha Licht
- Date of birth: 27 September 1974 (age 52)
- Place of birth: Neustadt bei Coburg, West Germany
- Height: 1.74 m (5 ft 9 in)
- Positions: Midfielder; forward

Youth career
- VfL Neustadt/Coburg 07
- –1992: Viktoria Coburg
- 1990–1992: 1. FC Nürnberg

Senior career*
Years	Team	Apps	(Gls)
1992–1994	1. FC Nürnberg	1	(0)
1994–1995	Dynamo Dresden	1	(0)
1995–1999	SC Weismain	110	(53)
1999–2003	SV Waldhof Mannheim	93	(21)
2003–2005	Kickers Offenbach	18	(2)
Total		223	(76)
- * Club domestic league appearances and goals

Sascha Licht (born 27 September 1974 in Neustadt bei Coburg) is a former German footballer.
