= Marco Dittgen =

German footballer

Personal information
- Date of birth: 19 August 1974 (age 52)
- Place of birth: Püttlingen, West Germany
- Height: 1.88 m (6 ft 2 in)
- Position: Forward

Youth career
- –1991: FV 08 Püttlingen
- 1991–1992: 1. FC Kaiserslautern

Senior career*
Years	Team	Apps	(Gls)
1992–1994	1. FC Kaiserslautern (A)		
1993–1994	1. FC Kaiserslautern	4	(0)
1994–1995	Dynamo Dresden	19	(3)
1995–1996	Young Boys Bern	21	(5)
1996–1997	FC St. Gallen	15	(4)
1997–1998	Palermo	21	(2)
1998–1999	VfB Leipzig	33	(12)
1999–2001	Chemnitzer FC	43	(10)
2001	Waldhof Mannheim	6	(0)
2001–2002	Rot-Weiß Erfurt	23	(5)
2002–2004	SV Röchling Völklingen		(44)
2004–2006	FC Kutzhof		
2006	FC Riegelsberg		
- * Club domestic league appearances and goals

Marco Dittgen (born 19 August 1974) is a German former professional footballer who played as a forward.
