= Uwe Spies =

German footballer

Personal information
- Date of birth: July 8, 1967 (age 59)
- Place of birth: Riedlingen, West Germany
- Height: 1.82 m (6 ft 0 in)
- Position: Striker

Senior career*
Years	Team	Apps	(Gls)
1986–1990	SSV Ulm	55	(11)
1990–1997	SC Freiburg	189	(52)
1997–2000	MSV Duisburg	86	(14)
Total		330	(77)
- * Club domestic league appearances and goals

Uwe Spies (born July 8, 1967 in Riedlingen) is a German former professional footballer who played as a striker.

== Honours ==
SC Freiburg

- Bundesliga third place: 1994–95

MSV Duisburg

- DFB-Pokal finalist: 1997–98
