= 1988–89 UEFA Cup =

18th season of Europe's secondary club football tournament organised by UEFA

Tournament details
- Dates: 7 September 1988 – 17 May 1989
- Teams: 64

Final positions
- Champions: (Italy) Napoli (1st title)
- Runners-up: (West Germany) Stuttgart

Tournament statistics
- Matches played: 126
- Goals scored: 334 (2.65 per match)
- Top scorer(s): Torsten Gütschow (Dynamo Dresden); 7 goals

The 1988–89 UEFA Cup was the 18th season of the UEFA Cup, the secondary club football competition organised by the Union of European Football Associations (UEFA). The final was played over two legs at the Stadio San Paolo, Naples, Italy, and at the Neckarstadion, Stuttgart, Germany. The competition was won by Napoli of Italy, who defeated Stuttgart of Germany by an aggregate result of 5–4 to claim their only major European title.

This was the first final and win in the UEFA Cup by an Italian team since Juventus in 1977, starting a successful era for Italian teams who went on to win six UEFA Cup titles in a seven-year period. This was the fourth season in which all English clubs were banned from European football competitions

== Association team allocation ==
A total of 64 teams from 30 UEFA member associations participated in the 1988–89 UEFA Cup, all entering from the first round over six knock-out rounds. The association ranking based on the UEFA country coefficients is used to determine the number of participating teams for each association:

- Associations 1–3 each have four teams qualify.
- Associations 4–8 each have three teams qualify.
- Associations 9–21 each have two teams qualify.
- Associations 22–32 each have one team qualify.

Due to the ongoing English ban, their two berths were allocated to associations 10–11, each gaining a third berth.

=== Association ranking ===
For the 1988–89 UEFA Cup, the associations are allocated places according to their 1987 UEFA country coefficients, which takes into account their performance in European competitions from 1982–83 to 1986–87.

Association ranking for 1988–89 UEFA Cup

Rank	Association	Coeff.	Teams	Notes
1	Italy	41.716	4	
2	Soviet Union	37.250	4	
3	West Germany	36.332	5	
4	Spain	32.999	3	
5	Scotland	32.700	3	
6	Portugal	31.100	3	
7	Belgium	30.800	3	
8	Austria	28.500	3	
9	England	25.951	0	
10	(Socialist Federal Republic of Yugoslavia) Yugoslavia	25.600	3	
11	Sweden	22.000	3	
12	Czechoslovakia	21.800	2	
13	Romania	21.416	2	
14	France	19.600	2	
15	Netherlands	19.433	2	
16	East Germany	18.800	2	
-	Wales	17.000	0	

Rank	Association	Coeff.	Teams	Notes
17	Greece	16.666	2	
18	Hungary	16.500	2	
19	Switzerland	16.250	2	
20	Poland	16.250	2	
21	Bulgaria	12.666	2	
22	Finland	10.997	1	
23	Turkey	8.999	1	
24	Denmark	8.916	1	
25	Albania	7.833	0	
26	Cyprus	6.665	1	
27	Norway	5.999	1	
28	(Northern Ireland) Northern Ireland	4.665	1	
29	(Republic of Ireland) Republic of Ireland	3.665	1	
30	Iceland	2.999	1	
31	Malta	1.666	1	
32	Luxembourg	0.999	1	

Albania: For unknown reasons, Albania elected to withdraw their UEFA Cup slot. Labinoti, the third placed team in the 1987–88 Albanian National Championship, would have qualified for the UEFA Cup. As per the regulations, title holders not already qualified for European competition had the priority for a vacant place, and it was awarded to Bayer Leverkusen, who had finished eighth in the 1987–88 Bundesliga, giving West Germany a fifth entry.
England: Since the Heysel Stadium disaster in 1985, all English football clubs were placed under an indefinite ban by Union of European Football Associations (UEFA) from all European competitions, which would be lifted in 1990–91. As the first two years of the ban had been tabulated, England fell down to ninth in the UEFA rankings, which reduced the number of re-allocated UEFA Cup berths for 1988–89 to two. These were transferred as a third berth for associations 10 and 11, namely Yugoslavia and Sweden. Manchester United would have qualified by league position, while Luton Town would have qualified as League Cup winners. Had England retained four European places, Nottingham Forest and Everton would have also qualified.
Wales: There was no national league in Wales before 1992 and the only competition organised by the Football Association of Wales was the Welsh Cup so Wales had just a single participant in European competitions, the winner (or best placed Welsh team as several English teams also competed) of the Welsh Cup which competed in the UEFA Cup Winners' Cup. Its virtual ranking is only an original research, because the UEFA country ranking was only used to allocate the UEFA Cup spots at time, so Wales was not included.

=== Teams ===
The labels in parentheses show how each team qualified for competition:

- TH: Title holders
- CW: Cup winners
- CR: Cup runners-up
- LC: League Cup winners
- 2nd, 3rd, 4th, 5th, 6th, etc.: League position
- P-W: End-of-season European competition play-offs winners

Qualified teams for 1988–89 UEFA Cup
(Italy) Napoli (2nd)	(Italy) Roma (3rd)	(Italy) Internazionale (5th)	(Italy) Juventus (P-W)
(Soviet Union) Dnipro Dnipropetrovsk (2nd)	(Soviet Union) Žalgiris Vilnius (3rd)	(Soviet Union) Torpedo Moscow (4th)	(Soviet Union) Dinamo Minsk (5th)
(West Germany) Bayer Leverkusen (TH)	(West Germany) Bayern Munich (2nd)	(West Germany) Köln (3rd)	(West Germany) Stuttgart (4th)
(West Germany) Nürnberg (5th)	(Spain) Real Sociedad (2nd)	(Spain) Atlético Madrid (3rd)	(Spain) Athletic Bilbao (4th)
(Scotland) Heart of Midlothian (2nd)	(Scotland) Rangers (3rd)	(Scotland) Aberdeen (4th)	(Portugal) Benfica (2nd)
(Portugal) Belenenses (3rd)	(Portugal) Sporting CP (4th)	(Belgium) Antwerp (3rd)	(Belgium) RFC Liège (5th)
(Belgium) Waregem (6th)	Austria Wien (2nd)	(Austria) Sturm Graz (3rd)	(Austria) First Vienna (4th)
(Socialist Federal Republic of Yugoslavia) Partizan (2nd)	(Socialist Federal Republic of Yugoslavia) Velež Mostar (3rd)	(Socialist Federal Republic of Yugoslavia) Dinamo Zagreb (4th)	(Sweden) Malmö (2nd)
(Sweden) Östers (4th)	(Sweden) IK Brage (5th)	(Czechoslovakia) Dukla Prague (2nd)	(Czechoslovakia) Dunajská Streda (3rd)
(Romania) Victoria București (3rd)	(Romania) Oţelul Galaţi (4th)	(France) Bordeaux (2nd)	(France) Montpellier (3rd)
(Netherlands) Ajax (2nd)	(Netherlands) Groningen (P-W)	(East Germany) Lokomotive Leipzig (2nd)	(East Germany) Dynamo Dresden (3rd)
(Greece) AEK Athens (2nd)	(Greece) PAOK (3rd)	(Hungary) Tatabányai Bányász (2nd)	(Hungary) Újpesti Dózsa (3rd)
(Switzerland) Servette (2nd)	(Switzerland) Aarau (3rd)	(Poland) Katowice (2nd)	(Poland) Legia Warsaw (3rd)
(Bulgaria) Trakia Plovdiv (3rd)	(Bulgaria) Slavia Sofia (4th)	(Finland) TPS (3rd)	(Turkey) Beşiktaş (2nd)
(Denmark) Ikast (2nd)	(Cyprus) APOEL (2nd)	(Norway) Molde (2nd)	(Northern Ireland) Linfield (2nd)
(Republic of Ireland) St Patrick's Athletic (2nd)	(Iceland) ÍA (3rd)	(Malta) Sliema Wanderers (2nd)	Union Luxembourg (3rd)

== Schedule ==
The schedule of the competition was as follows. Matches were scheduled for Wednesdays, except for the first leg of the quarter-finals, which was held on a Tuesday.

Schedule for 1988–89 UEFA Cup
Round	First leg	Second leg
First round	7 September 1988	5–12 October 1988
Second round	26 October 1988	9 November 1988
Third round	23 November 1988	7 December 1988
Quarter-finals	28 February 1989	15 March 1989
Semi-finals	5 April 1989	19 April 1989
Final	3 May 1989	17 May 1989

== First round ==
Team 1	Agg.	Team 2	1st leg	2nd leg
Stuttgart (West Germany)	3–2	(Hungary) Tatabányai Bányász	2–0	1–2
Antwerp (Belgium)	3–6	(West Germany) Köln	2–4	1–2
Bayern Munich (West Germany)	10–4	(Poland) Legia Warsaw	3–1	7–3
Bayer Leverkusen (West Germany)	0–2	(Portugal) Belenenses	0–1	0–1
Roma (Italy)	4–3	(West Germany) Nürnberg	1–2	3–1 (a.e.t.)
Groningen (Netherlands)	2–2 (a)	(Spain) Atlético Madrid	1–0	1–2
Aarau (Switzerland)	0–7	(East Germany) Lokomotive Leipzig	0–3	0–4
St Patrick's Athletic (Republic of Ireland)	0–4	(Scotland) Heart of Midlothian	0–2	0–2
Žalgiris Vilnius (Soviet Union)	4–5	Austria Wien	2–0	2–5
Sporting CP (Portugal)	6–3	(Netherlands) Ajax	4–2	2–1
Real Sociedad (Spain)	4–4 (a)	(Czechoslovakia) Dukla Prague	2–1	2–3
Union Luxembourg	1–11	(Belgium) RFC Liège	1–7	0–4
Internazionale (Italy)	4–2	(Sweden) IK Brage	2–1	2–1
ÍA (Iceland)	1–2	(Hungary) Újpesti Dózsa	0–0	1–2
Rangers (Scotland)	5–2	(Poland) GKS Katowice	1–0	4–2
Aberdeen (Scotland)	0–2	(East Germany) Dynamo Dresden	0–0	0–2
Dnipro Dnipropetrovsk (Soviet Union)	2–3	(France) Bordeaux	1–1	1–2
Östers IF (Sweden)	2–6	(Czechoslovakia) Dunajská Streda	2–0	0–6
TPS (Finland)	1–1 (a)	(Northern Ireland) Linfield	0–0	1–1
Molde (Norway)	1–5	(Belgium) Waregem	0–0	1–5
Malmö FF (Sweden)	3–2	(Soviet Union) Torpedo Moscow	2–0	1–2 (a.e.t.)
First Vienna (Austria)	2–2 (a)	(Denmark) Ikast	1–0	1–2
Oţelul Galaţi (Romania)	1–5	(Italy) Juventus	1–0	0–5
RŠD Velež (Socialist Federal Republic of Yugoslavia)	6–2	(Cyprus) APOEL	1–0	5–2
AEK Athens (Greece)	1–2	(Spain) Athletic Bilbao	1–0	0–2
Montpellier (France)	1–6	(Portugal) Benfica	0–3	1–3
Sliema Wanderers (Malta)	1–8	(Romania) Victoria București	0–2	1–6
Napoli (Italy)	2–1	(Greece) PAOK	1–0	1–1
Partizan (Socialist Federal Republic of Yugoslavia)	10–0	(Bulgaria) Slavia Sofia	5–0	5–0
Servette (Switzerland)	1–0	(Austria) Sturm Graz	1–0	0–0
Trakia Plovdiv (Bulgaria)	1–2	(Soviet Union) Dinamo Minsk	1–2	0–0
Beşiktaş (Turkey)	1–2	(Socialist Federal Republic of Yugoslavia) Dinamo Zagreb	1–0	0–2

=== First leg ===
7 September 1988

Stuttgart (West Germany)	2–0	(Hungary) Tatabányai Bányász
Gaudino 49'; Walter 88'

Neckarstadion, Stuttgart
Attendance: 20,600
Referee: José Pérez Sánchez (Spain)

7 September 1988

Antwerp (Belgium)	2–4	(West Germany) Köln
Van Rooij 34'; Goossens 43'		Keim 3'; Allofs 47'; Povlsen 55'; Janßen 87'

Bosuilstadion, Antwerp
Attendance: 20,000
Referee: Einar Halle (Norway)

7 September 1988

Bayern Munich (West Germany)	3–1	(Poland) Legia Warsaw
Wegmann 9'; Thon 23', 61'		Iwanicki 55'

Olympiastadion, Munich
Attendance: 15,000
Referee: Lajos Hartmann (Hungary)

7 September 1988

Bayer Leverkusen (West Germany)	0–1	(Portugal) Belenenses
		Mladenov 6'

Ulrich-Haberland-Stadion, Leverkusen
Attendance: 10,600
Referee: Piotr Werner (Poland)

7 September 1988

Roma (Italy)	1–2	(West Germany) Nürnberg
Desideri 48' (pen.)		Sané 45'; Eckstein 57'

Stadio Flaminio, Rome
Attendance: 16,263
Referee: José Rosa dos Santos (Portugal)

7 September 1988

Groningen (Netherlands)	1–0	(Spain) Atlético Madrid
Groeleken 41'

Stadion Oosterpark, Groningen
Attendance: 19,000
Referee: Lajos Németh (Hungary)

7 September 1988

Aarau (Switzerland)	0–3	(East Germany) Lokomotive Leipzig
		Hobsch 67', 81'; Marschall 85'

Stadion Brügglifeld, Aarau
Attendance: 6,500
Referee: Alain Delmer (France)

7 September 1988

St Patrick's Athletic (Republic of Ireland)	0–2	(Scotland) Heart of Midlothian
		Foster 14' (pen.); Galloway 41'

Tolka Park, Dublin
Attendance: 8,000
Referee: Howard King (Wales)

7 September 1988

Žalgiris Vilnius (Soviet Union)	2–0	Austria Wien
Fridrikas 59'; Baranauskas 78'

Žalgiris Stadium, Vilnius
Attendance: 17,000
Referee: Kim Milton Nielsen (Denmark)

7 September 1988
22:30

Sporting CP (Portugal)	4–2	(Netherlands) Ajax
Oceano 6'; Cascavel 21' (pen.); João Luís 25'; Litos 76' (pen.)	Report	Pettersson 18', 80'

Estádio José Alvalade, Lisbon
Attendance: 75,000
Referee: Ron Bridges (Wales)

7 September 1988

Real Sociedad (Spain)	2–1	(Czechoslovakia) Dukla Prague
Loinaz 37', 47'		Bittengel 38'

Atotxa, San Sebastián
Attendance: 21,000
Referee: Georges Sandoz (Switzerland)

7 September 1988

Union Luxembourg	1–7	(Belgium) RFC Liège
Jeitz 3'		Varga 7', 33'; Ernès 54' (pen.), 60'; De Sart 79'; Houben 81'; Boffin 84' (pen.)

Stade Achille-Hammerel, Luxembourg City
Attendance: 2,700
Referee: Franz Gächter (Austria)

7 September 1988

Internazionale (Italy)	2–1	(Sweden) IK Brage
Díaz 44' (pen.); Matteoli 89'		Arnberg 64' (pen.)

San Siro, Milan
Attendance: 30,901
Referee: Ion Crăciunescu (Romania)

7 September 1988

ÍA (Iceland)	0–0	(Hungary) Újpesti Dózsa

Akranesvöllur, Akranes
Attendance: 1,000
Referee: Patrick Daly (Republic of Ireland)

7 September 1988

Rangers (Scotland)	1–0	(Poland) GKS Katowice
Walters 73'

Ibrox Park, Glasgow
Attendance: 41,120
Referee: Claude Bouillet (France)

7 September 1988

Aberdeen (Scotland)	0–0	(East Germany) Dynamo Dresden

Pittodrie Stadium, Aberdeen
Attendance: 14,500
Referee: Peter Mikkelsen (Denmark)

7 September 1988
19:00

Dnipro Dnipropetrovsk (Soviet Union)	1–1	(France) Bordeaux
Lyutyi 49'	Report	Roche 24'

Meteor, Dnipropetrovsk
Attendance: 28,500
Referee: Neil Midgley (England)

7 September 1988

Östers IF (Sweden)	2–0	(Czechoslovakia) Dunajská Streda
Jesper Jansson 71'; Petäjä 76'

Värendsvallen, Växjö
Attendance: 1,141
Referee: Kurt Horsted (Denmark)

7 September 1988

TPS (Finland)	0–0	(Northern Ireland) Linfield

Kupittaan jalkapallostadion, Turku
Attendance: 2,977
Referee: Rune Larsson (Sweden)

7 September 1988

Molde (Norway)	0–0	(Belgium) Waregem

Molde stadion, Molde
Attendance: 3,020
Referee: Robert Stewart (Northern Ireland)

7 September 1988

Malmö FF (Sweden)	2–0	(Soviet Union) Torpedo Moscow
Dahlin 26'; Kovac 86' (o.g.)

Malmö Stadion, Malmö
Attendance: 9,505
Referee: Keith Cooper (Wales)

7 September 1988

First Vienna (Austria)	1–0	(Denmark) Ikast
Steinkogler 4'

Stadion Hohe Warte, Vienna
Attendance: 3,500
Referee: Gábor Plasek (Hungary)

7 September 1988

Oţelul Galaţi (Romania)	1–0	(Italy) Juventus
Profir 59' (pen.)

Stadionul Dunărea, Galați
Attendance: 35,000
Referee: Yusuf Namoğlu (Turkey)

7 September 1988

RŠD Velež (Socialist Federal Republic of Yugoslavia)	1–0	(Cyprus) APOEL
Repak 31'

Stadion pod Bijelim Brijegom, Mostar
Attendance: 8,000
Referee: Edgar Azzopardi (Malta)

7 September 1988
21:00

AEK Athens (Greece)	1–0	(Spain) Athletic Bilbao
Pittas 32'

AEK Stadium, Athens
Attendance: 26,997
Referee: Bob Valentine (Scotland)

7 September 1988

Montpellier (France)	0–3	(Portugal) Benfica
		Hernâni 8'; Abel Campos 44'; Valdo 83'

Stade de la Mosson, Montpellier
Attendance: 12,500
Referee: Manfred Neuner (West Germany)

7 September 1988

Sliema Wanderers (Malta)	0–2	(Romania) Victoria București
		Kulcsár 35'; Solomon 59' (pen.)

National Stadium, Ta' Qali, Attard
Attendance: 3,000
Referee: Meletis Voutsaras (Greece)

7 September 1988

Napoli (Italy)	1–0	(Greece) PAOK
Maradona 58' (pen.)

Stadio San Paolo, Naples
Attendance: 62,662
Referee: Aron Schmidhuber (West Germany)

7 September 1988

Partizan (Socialist Federal Republic of Yugoslavia)	5–0	(Bulgaria) Slavia Sofia
Batrović 7', 28'; V. Đukić 46'; Vokrri 48'; M. Đukić 90'

Stadion JNA, Belgrade
Attendance: 25,000
Referee: José Pes Pérez (Spain)

7 September 1988

Servette (Switzerland)	1–0	(Austria) Sturm Graz
Grossenbacher 89'

Stade des Charmilles, Geneva
Attendance: 9,800
Referee: Manfred Roßner (East Germany)

7 September 1988

Trakia Plovdiv (Bulgaria)	1–2	(Soviet Union) Dinamo Minsk
Zaytsev 88'		Kandratsyew 45'; Hotsmanaw 80'

Stadion Hristo Botev, Plovdiv
Attendance: 8,000
Referee: Rudolf Liska (Czechoslovakia)

7 September 1988

Beşiktaş (Turkey)	1–0	(Socialist Federal Republic of Yugoslavia) Dinamo Zagreb
Feyyaz 5'

İnönü Stadium, Istanbul
Attendance: 20,286
Referee: Yuri Savchenko (Soviet Union)

=== Second leg ===
5 October 1988

Tatabányai Bányász (Hungary)	2–1	(West Germany) Stuttgart
Csapó 53'; Schmidt 81'		Allgöwer 78' (pen.)

Városi Stadion, Tatabánya
Attendance: 8,000
Referee: Vassilios Nikakis (Greece)

Stuttgart won 3–2 on aggregate.

5 October 1988

Legia Warsaw (Poland)	3–7	(West Germany) Bayern Munich
Kubicki 36'; R. Robakiewicz 85', 88'		Nachtweih 19'; Ekström 23', 44'; Augenthaler 41'; Wegmann 78', 82'; Eck 89'

Stadion Wojska Polskiego, Warsaw
Attendance: 12,000
Referee: John Martin (England)

Bayern Munich won 10–4 on aggregate.

5 October 1988

Atlético Madrid (Spain)	2–1	(Netherlands) Groningen
Baltazar 4' (pen.); Futre 48'		Ten Caat 20'

Estadio Vicente Calderón, Madrid
Attendance: 35,000
Referee: Klaus Peschel (East Germany)

2–2 on aggregate. Groningen won on away goals.

5 October 1988

Lokomotive Leipzig (East Germany)	4–0	(Switzerland) Aarau
Zimmerling 21', 28' (pen.); Halata 59', 83'

Bruno-Plache-Stadion, Leipzig
Attendance: 5,200
Referee: Kaj Natri (Finland)

Lokomotive Leipzig won 7–0 on aggregate.

5 October 1988

Heart of Midlothian (Scotland)	2–0	(Republic of Ireland) St Patrick's Athletic
Black 24'; Galloway 67'

Tynecastle Park, Edinburgh
Attendance: 8,000
Referee: Thorodd Presberg (Norway)

Heart of Midlothian won 4–0 on aggregate.

5 October 1988

Austria Wien	5–2	(Soviet Union) Žalgiris Vilnius
Pleva 4', 15'; Prohaska 5'; Sekerlioglu 45'; Percudani 73'		Baltušnikas 3'; Fridrikas 51'

Franz-Horr-Stadion, Vienna
Attendance: 5,000
Referee: Michel Girard (France)

Austria Wien won 5–4 on aggregate.

5 October 1988
20:15

Ajax (Netherlands)	1–2	(Portugal) Sporting CP
Verkuijl 80'	Report	Silas 21'; Rui Maside 87'

Stadion De Meer, Amsterdam
Attendance: 22,000
Referee: Adolf Prokop (East Germany)

Sporting CP won 6–3 on aggregate.

5 October 1988

Dukla Prague (Czechoslovakia)	3–2	(Spain) Real Sociedad
Němec 17'; Foldyna 55'; Bittengel 72'		Loren 75'; Loinaz 82'

Stadion Juliska, Prague
Attendance: 6,119
Referee: Alexis Ponnet (Belgium)

4–4 on aggregate. Real Sociedad won on away goals.

5 October 1988

RFC Liège (Belgium)	4–0	Union Luxembourg
Malbaša 8', 56'; Veyt 34', 61'

Stade Vélodrome de Rocourt, Liège
Attendance: 3,000
Referee: Werner Föckler (West Germany)

RFC Liège won 11–1 on aggregate.

5 October 1988

IK Brage (Sweden)	1–2	(Italy) Internazionale
Hällman 45'		Berti 10'; Morello 77'

Domnarvsvallen, Borlänge
Attendance: 8,652
Referee: Klaus Scheurell (East Germany)

Internazionale won 4–2 on aggregate.

5 October 1988

Újpesti Dózsa (Hungary)	2–1	(Iceland) ÍA
Steidl 44'; Katona 72'		K. Þórðarson 68'

Megyeri úti Stadion, Budapest
Attendance: 1,000
Referee: Velichko Tsonchev (Bulgaria)

Újpesti Dózsa won 2–1 on aggregate.

5 October 1988

GKS Katowice (Poland)	2–4	(Scotland) Rangers
Furtok 5'; Kubisztal 62'		Butcher 12', 16'; Durrant 71'; I. Ferguson 78'

Stadion GKS Katowice, Katowice
Attendance: 35,000
Referee: Pietro D'Elia (Italy)

Rangers won 5–2 on aggregate.

5 October 1988

Dynamo Dresden (East Germany)	2–0	(Scotland) Aberdeen
Gütschow 4'; Kirsten 66'

Dynamo-Stadion, Dresden
Attendance: 36,000
Referee: Bruno Galler (Switzerland)

Dynamo Dresden won 2–0 on aggregate.

5 October 1988

Bordeaux (France)	2–1	(Soviet Union) Dnipro Dnipropetrovsk
Stopyra 48'; Scifo 75' (pen.)		Cherednyk 2'

Parc Lescure, Bordeaux
Attendance: 35,000
Referee: Helmut Kohl (Austria)

Bordeaux won 3–2 on aggregate.

5 October 1988

Dunajská Streda (Czechoslovakia)	6–0	(Sweden) Östers IF
Liba 8'; Takáč 13', 26'; Pavlík 44'; Mičinec 46'; Šoltés 60'

Mestský štadión, Dunajská Streda
Attendance: 4,140
Referee: Roman Steindl (Austria)

Dunajská Streda won 6–2 on aggregate.

5 October 1988

Linfield (Northern Ireland)	1–1	(Finland) TPS
O'Boyle 75'		Suominen 38'

Racecourse Ground, Wrexham
Attendance: 904
Referee: Guy Goethals (Belgium)

1–1 on aggregate. TPS won on away goals.

5 October 1988

Waregem (Belgium)	5–1	(Norway) Molde
Niederbacher 43', 47'; Christiaens 69', 72'; Teppers 86'		Rekdal 78'

Regenboogstadion, Waregem
Attendance: 5,000
Referee: Friedrich Kaupe (Austria)

Waregem won 5–1 on aggregate.

5 October 1988

Torpedo Moscow (Soviet Union)	2–1 (a.e.t.)	(Sweden) Malmö FF
Grechnyov 18'; Shirinbekov 66'		Ljung 104' (pen.)

Torpedo Stadium, Moscow
Attendance: 8,200
Referee: Ildefonso Urizar (Spain)

Malmö FF won 3–2 on aggregate.

5 October 1988

Ikast (Denmark)	2–1	(Austria) First Vienna
J. Hansen 63'; Granlund 73'		Glatzmayer 5'

Ikast Stadion, Ikast
Attendance: 3,371
Referee: Bo Helén (Sweden)

2–2 on aggregate. First Vienna won on away goals.

12 October 1988

Juventus (Italy)	5–0	(Romania) Oţelul Galaţi
De Agostini 18'; Agiu 26' (o.g.); Rui Barros 29', 72'; Altobelli 50'

Stadio Comunale Vittorio Pozzo, Turin
Attendance: 15,613
Referee: Bep Thomas (Netherlands)

Juventus won 5–1 on aggregate.

5 October 1988

APOEL (Cyprus)	2–5	(Socialist Federal Republic of Yugoslavia) RŠD Velež
Owen 44' (pen.); Plakitis 62'		Kleanthous 35' (o.g.); Gudelj 47', 88'; Tuce 50'; Repak 58'

Makario Stadium, Nicosia
Attendance: 7,000
Referee: Mircea Salomir (Romania)

RŠD Velež won 6–2 on aggregate.

5 October 1988
21:15

Athletic Bilbao (Spain)	2–0	(Greece) AEK Athens
Uralde 3', 6'

Estadio San Mamés, Bilbao
Attendance: 35,000
Referee: Luigi Agnolin (Italy)

Athletic Bilbao won 2–1 on aggregate.

5 October 1988

Benfica (Portugal)	3–1	(France) Montpellier
Chalana 22'; Ademir Alcântara 51'; Mozer 73'		Cubaynes 82'

Estádio do Sport Lisboa e Benfica, Lisbon
Attendance: 50,000
Referee: Carlo Longhi (Italy)

Benfica won 6–1 on aggregate.

5 October 1988

Victoria București (Romania)	6–1	(Malta) Sliema Wanderers
Cojocaru 12', 41'; Coraș 16', 39', 43' (pen.); Layiș 89'		M. Gauci 90'

Stadionul Victoria, Bucharest
Attendance: 5,000
Referee: Kazimierz Orłowski (Poland)

Victoria București won 8–1 on aggregate.

5 October 1988

PAOK (Greece)	1–1	(Italy) Napoli
Skartados 65'		Careca 17'

Toumba Stadium, Thessaloniki
Attendance: 45,000
Referee: Horst Brummeier (Austria)

Napoli won 2–1 on aggregate.

5 October 1988

Slavia Sofia (Bulgaria)	0–5	(Socialist Federal Republic of Yugoslavia) Partizan
		Vokrri 48'; Đorđević 51'; Grekov 73' (o.g.); M. Đukić 80'; V. Đukić 89'

Stadion Slavia, Sofia
Attendance: 6,500
Referee: José Silva (Portugal)

Partizan won 10–0 on aggregate.

5 October 1988

Sturm Graz (Austria)	0–0	(Switzerland) Servette

Bundesstadion Liebenau, Graz
Attendance: 7,000
Referee: Jean-François Crucke (Belgium)

Servette won 1–0 on aggregate.

5 October 1988

Dinamo Minsk (Soviet Union)	0–0	(Bulgaria) Trakia Plovdiv

Dinamo Stadium, Minsk
Attendance: 35,300
Referee: Ioan Igna (Romania)

Dinamo Minsk won 2–1 on aggregate.

5 October 1988

Dinamo Zagreb (Socialist Federal Republic of Yugoslavia)	2–0	(Turkey) Beşiktaş
Mihajlović 40', 65' (pen.)

Stadion Maksimir, Zagreb
Attendance: 30,000
Referee: Todor Kolev (Bulgaria)

Dinamo Zagreb won 2–1 on aggregate.

12 October 1988

Köln (West Germany)	2–1	(Belgium) Antwerp
Littbarski 8'; Allofs 10'		Dekenne 4'

Müngersdorfer Stadion, Cologne
Attendance: 1,500
Referee: Bo Karlsson (Sweden)

Köln won 6–3 on aggregate.

12 October 1988

Belenenses (Portugal)	1–0	(West Germany) Bayer Leverkusen
Adão 84'

Estádio do Restelo, Lisbon
Attendance: 18,000
Referee: Brian Hill (England)

Belenenses won 2–0 on aggregate.

12 October 1988

Nürnberg (West Germany)	1–3 (a.e.t.)	(Italy) Roma
Eckstein 21' (pen.)		Völler 9'; Policano 35'; Renato Gaúcho 93'

Städtisches Stadion, Nuremberg
Attendance: 20,000
Referee: Valeri Butenko (Soviet Union)

Roma won 4–3 on aggregate.

== Second round ==
Team 1	Agg.	Team 2	1st leg	2nd leg
Bayern Munich (West Germany)	5–1	(Czechoslovakia) Dunajská Streda	3–1	2–0
Köln (West Germany)	3–1	(Scotland) Rangers	2–0	1–1
Dinamo Zagreb (Socialist Federal Republic of Yugoslavia)	2–4	(West Germany) Stuttgart	1–3	1–1
Partizan (Socialist Federal Republic of Yugoslavia)	4–4 (a)	(Italy) Roma	4–2	0–2
RŠD Velež (Socialist Federal Republic of Yugoslavia)	0–0 (4–3 p)	(Portugal) Belenenses	0–0	0–0 (a.e.t.)
Sporting CP (Portugal)	1–2	(Spain) Real Sociedad	1–2	0–0
Heart of Midlothian (Scotland)	1–0	Austria Wien	0–0	1–0
Lokomotive Leipzig (East Germany)	1–3	(Italy) Napoli	1–1	0–2
Újpesti Dózsa (Hungary)	0–2	(France) Bordeaux	0–1	0–1
Juventus (Italy)	7–4	(Spain) Athletic Bilbao	5–1	2–3
Dynamo Dresden (East Germany)	5–3	(Belgium) Waregem	4–1	1–2
First Vienna (Austria)	2–2 (a)	(Finland) TPS	2–1	0–1
Malmö FF (Sweden)	1–2	(Italy) Internazionale	0–1	1–1
RFC Liège (Belgium)	3–2	(Portugal) Benfica	2–1	1–1
Groningen (Netherlands)	3–1	(Switzerland) Servette	2–0	1–1
Dinamo Minsk (Soviet Union)	2–2 (a)	(Romania) Victoria București	2–1	0–1

=== First leg ===
26 October 1988

Bayern Munich (West Germany)	3–1	(Czechoslovakia) Dunajská Streda
Flick 21'; Wegmann 53'; Thon 75'		Szaban 77'

Olympiastadion, Munich
Attendance: 11,000
Referee: Michał Listkiewicz (Poland)

26 October 1988

Köln (West Germany)	2–0	(Scotland) Rangers
Janßen 75'; Allofs 87'

Müngersdorfer Stadion, Cologne
Attendance: 42,000
Referee: Lajos Németh (Hungary)

26 October 1988

Dinamo Zagreb (Socialist Federal Republic of Yugoslavia)	1–3	(West Germany) Stuttgart
Besek 79'		Klinsmann 44'; Walter 51'; Schröder 63'

Stadion Maksimir, Zagreb
Attendance: 40,000
Referee: Marcel Van Langenhove (Belgium)

26 October 1988

Partizan (Socialist Federal Republic of Yugoslavia)	4–2	(Italy) Roma
V. Đukić 17', 77'; Vermezović 31'; Milojević 54'		Conti 10', 68'

Stadion JNA, Belgrade
Attendance: 44,790
Referee: Lajos Hartmann (Hungary)

The match was briefly interrupted for an intervention by the fire brigade due to Partizan fans starting a large fire at the stadium's east stand by burning the high jump sponge mat. Furthermore, Roma captain Giuseppe Giannini got hit in the head with a coin thrown from the stands as Partizan fans pelted the pitch with missiles following one of the Roma goals. In addition to the SFr200,000 monetary fine, UEFA punished Partizan with a one-match stadium ban, enforced for their 1989–90 Cup Winners' Cup first round tie versus Celtic.

26 October 1988

RŠD Velež (Socialist Federal Republic of Yugoslavia)	0–0	(Portugal) Belenenses

Stadion pod Bijelim Brijegom, Mostar
Attendance: 15,000
Referee: Peter Mikkelsen (Denmark)

26 October 1988

Sporting CP (Portugal)	1–2	(Spain) Real Sociedad
Cascavel 32' (pen.)		Iturrino 17'; Loren 49'

Estádio José Alvalade, Lisbon
Attendance: 50,000
Referee: Aron Schmidhuber (West Germany)

26 October 1988

Heart of Midlothian (Scotland)	0–0	Austria Wien

Tynecastle Park, Edinburgh
Attendance: 14,021
Referee: Ignace van Swieten (Netherlands)

26 October 1988

Lokomotive Leipzig (East Germany)	1–1	(Italy) Napoli
Zimmerling 69'		Francini 73'

Zentralstadion, Leipzig
Attendance: 80,100
Referee: Alexis Ponnet (Belgium)

26 October 1988

Újpesti Dózsa (Hungary)	0–1	(France) Bordeaux
		Stopyra 45'

Megyeri úti Stadion, Budapest
Attendance: 3,000
Referee: İhsan Türe (Turkey)

26 October 1988

Juventus (Italy)	5–1	(Spain) Athletic Bilbao
Laudrup 4', 51'; Galia 23'; Mauro 40'; Altobelli 46'		Uralde 35'

Stadio Comunale Vittorio Pozzo, Turin
Attendance: 37,752
Referee: Neil Midgley (England)

26 October 1988

Dynamo Dresden (East Germany)	4–1	(Belgium) Waregem
Kirchner 12'; Kirsten 23', 39', 64'		Niederbacher 83'

Dynamo-Stadion, Dresden
Attendance: 35,000
Referee: John Blankenstein (Netherlands)

26 October 1988

First Vienna (Austria)	2–1	(Finland) TPS
Drabits 15'; Glatzmayer 61'		Jalo 34'

Stadion Hohe Warte, Vienna
Attendance: 5,000
Referee: Ioan Igna (Romania)

26 October 1988

Malmö FF (Sweden)	0–1	(Italy) Internazionale
		Serena 82'

Malmö Stadion, Malmö
Attendance: 14,203
Referee: Claude Bouillet (France)

26 October 1988

RFC Liège (Belgium)	2–1	(Portugal) Benfica
Varga 58'; Malbaša 68'		Chalana 48' (pen.)

Stade Jules Georges, Liège
Attendance: 30,000
Referee: Thorbjørn Aas (Norway)

26 October 1988

Groningen (Netherlands)	2–0	(Switzerland) Servette
Groeleken 11'; Meijer 83'

Stadion Oosterpark, Groningen
Attendance: 19,500
Referee: Alexey Spirin (Soviet Union)

26 October 1988

Dinamo Minsk (Soviet Union)	2–1	(Romania) Victoria București
Hurynovich 45'; Zygmantovich 78'		Kulcsár 57'

Dinamo Stadium, Minsk
Attendance: 23,000
Referee: Velichko Tsonchev (Bulgaria)

=== Second leg ===
9 November 1988

Dunajská Streda (Czechoslovakia)	0–2	(West Germany) Bayern Munich
		Thon 4' (pen.), 28'

Mestský štadión, Dunajská Streda
Attendance: 15,572
Referee: Oliver Donnelly (Northern Ireland)

Bayern Munich won 5–1 on aggregate.

9 November 1988

Rangers (Scotland)	1–1	(West Germany) Köln
Drinkell 77'		Janßen 90'

Ibrox Park, Glasgow
Attendance: 42,204
Referee: Luigi Agnolin (Italy)

Köln won 3–1 on aggregate.

9 November 1988

Stuttgart (West Germany)	1–1	(Socialist Federal Republic of Yugoslavia) Dinamo Zagreb
Walter 48'		Mihajlović 66'

Neckarstadion, Stuttgart
Attendance: 17,600
Referee: Vítor Fernandes Correia (Portugal)

Stuttgart won 4–2 on aggregate.

9 November 1988

Roma (Italy)	2–0	(Socialist Federal Republic of Yugoslavia) Partizan
Völler 21'; Giannini 72' (pen.)

Stadio Olimpico, Rome
Attendance: 20,755
Referee: Victoriano Sánchez Arminio (Spain)

4–4 on aggregate. Roma won on away goals.

9 November 1988

Belenenses (Portugal)	0–0 (a.e.t.)	(Socialist Federal Republic of Yugoslavia) RŠD Velež
Penalties
Chico Faria (penalty scored); Mladenov (penalty scored); Ribeiro (penalty missed); Adão (penalty scored); Jaime (penalty missed)	3–4	(penalty scored) Gudelj; (penalty scored) Kodro; (penalty scored) Repak; (penalty missed) Rahimić; (penalty scored) Barbarić

Estádio do Restelo, Lisbon
Attendance: 10,000
Referee: David Syme (Scotland)

0–0 on aggregate. RŠD Velež won 4–3 on penalties.

9 November 1988

Real Sociedad (Spain)	0–0	(Portugal) Sporting CP

Atotxa, San Sebastián
Attendance: 20,000
Referee: Pietro D'Elia (Italy)

Real Sociedad won 2–1 on aggregate.

9 November 1988

Austria Wien	0–1	(Scotland) Heart of Midlothian
		Galloway 58'

Praterstadion, Vienna
Attendance: 15,000
Referee: José María Enríquez Negreira (Spain)

Heart of Midlothian won 1–0 on aggregate.

9 November 1988

Napoli (Italy)	2–0	(East Germany) Lokomotive Leipzig
Francini 2'; Scholz 61' (o.g.)

Stadio San Paolo, Naples
Attendance: 53,442
Referee: Georges Sandoz (Switzerland)

Napoli won 3–1 on aggregate.

9 November 1988

Bordeaux (France)	1–0	(Hungary) Újpesti Dózsa
Ferreri 74' (pen.)

Parc Lescure, Bordeaux
Attendance: 20,059
Referee: Adolf Prokop (East Germany)

Bordeaux won 2–0 on aggregate.

9 November 1988

Athletic Bilbao (Spain)	3–2	(Italy) Juventus
Uralde 52'; Andrinúa 58', 70'		Laudrup 35'; Galia 77'

Estadio San Mamés, Bilbao
Attendance: 25,000
Referee: Erik Fredriksson (Sweden)

Juventus won 7–4 on aggregate.

9 November 1988

Waregem (Belgium)	2–1	(East Germany) Dynamo Dresden
Niederbacher 10'; Van Baekel 49'		Pilz 54' (pen.)

Regenboogstadion, Waregem
Attendance: 5,000
Referee: Keith Cooper (Wales)

Dynamo Dresden won 5–3 on aggregate.

9 November 1988

TPS (Finland)	1–0	(Austria) First Vienna
Sulonen 69'

Kupittaan jalkapallostadion, Turku
Attendance: 2,894
Referee: Yuri Savchenko (Soviet Union)

2–2 on aggregate. TPS won on away goals.

9 November 1988

Internazionale (Italy)	1–1	(Sweden) Malmö FF
Díaz 12'		Nilsson 66'

San Siro, Milan
Attendance: 45,936
Referee: Jiří Stiegler (Czechoslovakia)

Internazionale won 2–1 on aggregate.

9 November 1988

Benfica (Portugal)	1–1	(Belgium) RFC Liège
Lima 58'		Malbaša 18'

Estádio do Sport Lisboa e Benfica, Lisbon
Attendance: 60,000
Referee: Günther Habermann (East Germany)

RFC Liège won 3–2 on aggregate.

9 November 1988

Servette (Switzerland)	1–1	(Netherlands) Groningen
Schällibaum 30'		Meijer 83'

Stade des Charmilles, Geneva
Attendance: 12,000
Referee: Tullio Lanese (Italy)

Groningen won 3–1 on aggregate.

9 November 1988

Victoria București (Romania)	1–0	(Soviet Union) Dinamo Minsk
Solomon 54' (pen.)

Stadionul Victoria, Bucharest
Attendance: 10,000
Referee: Vaso Vujović (Yugoslavia)

2–2 on aggregate. Victoria București won on away goals.

== Third round ==
Team 1	Agg.	Team 2	1st leg	2nd leg
Bayern Munich (West Germany)	3–3 (a)	(Italy) Internazionale	0–2	3–1
Real Sociedad (Spain)	3–2	(West Germany) Köln	1–0	2–2
Groningen (Netherlands)	1–5	(West Germany) Stuttgart	1–3	0–2
Heart of Midlothian (Scotland)	4–2	(Socialist Federal Republic of Yugoslavia) RŠD Velež	3–0	1–2
Bordeaux (France)	0–1	(Italy) Napoli	0–1	0–0
Dynamo Dresden (East Germany)	4–0	(Italy) Roma	2–0	2–0
RFC Liège (Belgium)	0–2	(Italy) Juventus	0–1	0–1
Victoria București (Romania)	3–3 (a)	(Finland) TPS	1–0	2–3

=== First leg ===
23 November 1988

Bayern Munich (West Germany)	0–2	(Italy) Internazionale
		Serena 60'; Berti 71'

Olympiastadion, Munich
Attendance: 73,000
Referee: Alexis Ponnet (Belgium)

23 November 1988

Real Sociedad (Spain)	1–0	(West Germany) Köln
Loinaz 75'

Atotxa, San Sebastián
Attendance: 20,000
Referee: David Syme (Scotland)

23 November 1988

Groningen (Netherlands)	1–3	(West Germany) Stuttgart
Meijer 82'		Allgöwer 18'; Gaudino 32', 39'

Stadion Oosterpark, Groningen
Attendance: 20,400
Referee: Jiří Stiegler (Czechoslovakia)

23 November 1988

Heart of Midlothian (Scotland)	3–0	(Socialist Federal Republic of Yugoslavia) RŠD Velež
Bannon 17'; Galloway 56'; Colquhoun 90'

Tynecastle Park, Edinburgh
Attendance: 17,417
Referee: Erik Fredriksson (Sweden)

23 November 1988

Bordeaux (France)	0–1	(Italy) Napoli
		Carnevale 6'

Parc Lescure, Bordeaux
Attendance: 27,315
Referee: Karl-Heinz Tritschler (West Germany)

23 November 1988

Dynamo Dresden (East Germany)	2–0	(Italy) Roma
Gütschow 14' (pen.); Minge 82'

Dynamo-Stadion, Dresden
Attendance: 36,000
Referee: Gérard Biguet (France)

23 November 1988

RFC Liège (Belgium)	0–1	(Italy) Juventus
		Altobelli 17'

Stade Vélodrome de Rocourt, Liège
Attendance: 32,000
Referee: Bob Valentine (Scotland)

23 November 1988

Victoria București (Romania)	1–0	(Finland) TPS
Ursu 3'

Stadionul Victoria, Bucharest
Attendance: 12,000
Referee: Victoriano Sánchez Arminio (Spain)

=== Second leg ===
7 December 1988

Internazionale (Italy)	1–3	(West Germany) Bayern Munich
Serena 45'		Wohlfarth 33'; Augenthaler 37'; Wegmann 41'

San Siro, Milan
Attendance: 68,158
Referee: Bruno Galler (Switzerland)

3–3 on aggregate. Bayern Munich won on away goals.

7 December 1988

Köln (West Germany)	2–2	(Spain) Real Sociedad
Götz 4'; Engels 29'		Goikoetxea 38' (pen.); Fuentes 90'

Müngersdorfer Stadion, Cologne
Attendance: 38,000
Referee: Henning Lund-Sørensen (Denmark)

Real Sociedad won 3–2 on aggregate.

7 December 1988

Stuttgart (West Germany)	2–0	(Netherlands) Groningen
Klinsmann 22', 52'

Neckarstadion, Stuttgart
Attendance: 8,500
Referee: Gerasimos Germanakos (Greece)

Stuttgart won 5–1 on aggregate.

7 December 1988

RŠD Velež (Socialist Federal Republic of Yugoslavia)	2–1	(Scotland) Heart of Midlothian
Tuce 30'; Gudelj 88'		Galloway 53'

Stadion pod Bijelim Brijegom, Mostar
Attendance: 20,000
Referee: Carlo Longhi (Italy)

Heart of Midlothian won 4–2 on aggregate.

7 December 1988

Napoli (Italy)	0–0	(France) Bordeaux

Stadio San Paolo, Naples
Attendance: 58,794
Referee: Neil Midgley (England)

Napoli won 1–0 on aggregate.

7 December 1988

Roma (Italy)	0–2	(East Germany) Dynamo Dresden
		Gütschow 70'; Kirsten 80'

Stadio Olimpico, Rome
Attendance: 30,336
Referee: Helmut Kohl (Austria)

Dynamo Dresden won 4–0 on aggregate.

7 December 1988

Juventus (Italy)	1–0	(Belgium) RFC Liège
Altobelli 16'

Stadio Comunale Vittorio Pozzo, Turin
Attendance: 27,792
Referee: Adolf Prokop (East Germany)

Juventus won 2–0 on aggregate.

7 December 1988

TPS (Finland)	3–2	(Romania) Victoria București
Rajamäki 37'; Halonen 51'; Jalo 90'		Solomon 16'; Heikkinen 25' (o.g.)

Kupittaan jalkapallostadion, Turku
Attendance: 3,595
Referee: Bep Thomas (Netherlands)

3–3 on aggregate. Victoria București won on away goals.

== Quarter-finals ==
Team 1	Agg.	Team 2	1st leg	2nd leg
Stuttgart (West Germany)	1–1 (4–2 p)	(Spain) Real Sociedad	1–0	0–1 (a.e.t.)
Heart of Midlothian (Scotland)	1–2	(West Germany) Bayern Munich	1–0	0–2
Juventus (Italy)	2–3	(Italy) Napoli	2–0	0–3 (a.e.t.)
Victoria București (Romania)	1–5	(East Germany) Dynamo Dresden	1–1	0–4

=== First leg ===
28 February 1989

Stuttgart (West Germany)	1–0	(Spain) Real Sociedad
Walter 35'

Neckarstadion, Stuttgart
Attendance: 25,160
Referee: Rosario Lo Bello (Italy)

28 February 1989

Heart of Midlothian (Scotland)	1–0	(West Germany) Bayern Munich
Ferguson 56'

Tynecastle Park, Edinburgh
Attendance: 26,294
Referee: Helmut Kohl (Austria)

1 March 1989

Juventus (Italy)	2–0	(Italy) Napoli
Bruno 13'; Corradini 45' (o.g.)

Stadio Comunale Vittorio Pozzo, Turin
Attendance: 46,204
Referee: George Courtney (England)

28 February 1989

Victoria București (Romania)	1–1	(East Germany) Dynamo Dresden
Solomon 48'		Gütschow 24'

Stadionul Victoria, Bucharest
Attendance: 12,000
Referee: David Syme (Scotland)

=== Second leg ===
15 March 1989

Real Sociedad (Spain)	1–0 (a.e.t.)	(West Germany) Stuttgart
Zamora 17'
Penalties
Goikoetxea (penalty scored); Martínez (penalty missed); Loinaz (penalty scored); Gajate (penalty missed)	2–4	(penalty scored) Allgöwer; (penalty scored) Gaudino; (penalty scored) Walter; (penalty scored) Buchwald

Atotxa, San Sebastián
Attendance: 27,400
Referee: Joe Worrall (England)

1–1 on aggregate. Stuttgart won 4–2 on penalties.

15 March 1989

Bayern Munich (West Germany)	2–0	(Scotland) Heart of Midlothian
Augenthaler 16'; Johnsen 69'

Olympiastadion, Munich
Attendance: 25,000
Referee: Emilio Soriano Aladrén (Spain)

Bayern Munich won 2–1 on aggregate.

15 March 1989

Napoli (Italy)	3–0 (a.e.t.)	(Italy) Juventus
Maradona 10' (pen.); Carnevale 45'; Renica 120'

Stadio San Paolo, Naples
Attendance: 83,089
Referee: Siegfried Kirschen (East Germany)

Napoli won 3–2 on aggregate.

15 March 1989

Dynamo Dresden (East Germany)	4–0	(Romania) Victoria București
Minge 47', 77'; Gütschow 87', 90' (pen.)

Dynamo-Stadion, Dresden
Attendance: 36,000
Referee: Erik Fredriksson (Sweden)

Dynamo Dresden won 5–1 on aggregate.

== Semi-finals ==
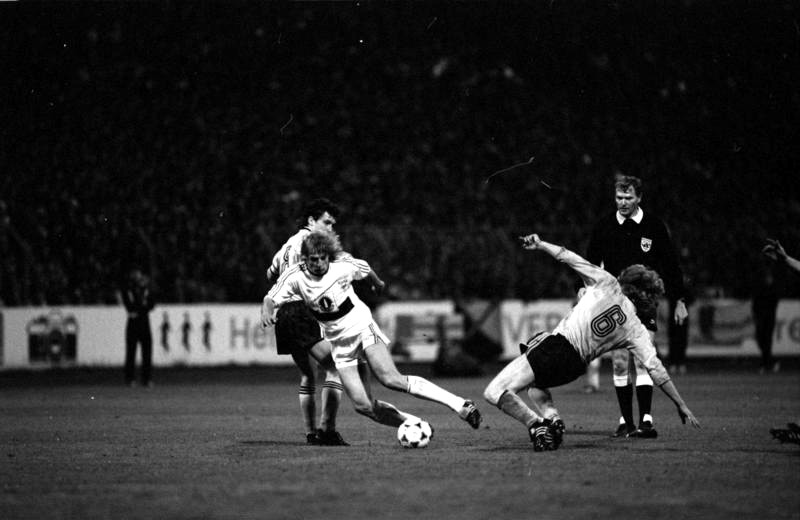
Dynamo Dresden v. Stuttgart in the semi-final.

Team 1	Agg.	Team 2	1st leg	2nd leg
Napoli (Italy)	4–2	(West Germany) Bayern Munich	2–0	2–2
Stuttgart (West Germany)	2–1	(East Germany) Dynamo Dresden	1–0	1–1

=== First leg ===
5 April 1989

Napoli (Italy)	2–0	(West Germany) Bayern Munich
Careca 41'; Carnevale 60'

Stadio San Paolo, Naples
Attendance: 77,593
Referee: Michel Vautrot (France)

5 April 1989

Stuttgart (West Germany)	1–0	(East Germany) Dynamo Dresden
Allgöwer 69'

Neckarstadion, Stuttgart
Attendance: 55,000
Referee: Lajos Németh (Hungary)

=== Second leg ===
19 April 1989

Bayern Munich (West Germany)	2–2	(Italy) Napoli
Wohlfarth 63'; Reuter 81'		Careca 61', 76'

Olympiastadion, Munich
Attendance: 73,132
Referee: David Syme (Scotland)

Napoli won 4–2 on aggregate.

19 April 1989

Dynamo Dresden (East Germany)	1–1	(West Germany) Stuttgart
Lieberam 83'		Allgöwer 64'

Dynamo-Stadion, Dresden
Attendance: 38,000
Referee: Horst Brummeier (Austria)

Stuttgart won 2–1 on aggregate.

== Final ==
=== First leg ===
3 May 1989

Napoli (Italy)	2–1	(West Germany) Stuttgart
Maradona 68' (pen.); Careca 87'	Report	Gaudino 17'

Stadio San Paolo, Naples
Attendance: 81,093
Referee: Gerasimos Germanakos (Greece)

=== Second leg ===
17 May 1989

Stuttgart (West Germany)	3–3	(Italy) Napoli
Klinsmann 27'; De Napoli 70' (o.g.); O. Schmäler 89'	Report	Alemão 18'; Ferrara 39'; Careca 62'

Neckarstadion, Stuttgart
Attendance: 67,000
Referee: Victoriano Sánchez Arminio (Spain)

Napoli won 5–4 on aggregate.
