= 1990–91 European Cup Winners' Cup =

Tournament details
- Dates: 19 August 1990 – 15 May 1991
- Teams: 33

Final positions
- Champions: (England) Manchester United (1st title)
- Runners-up: (Spain) Barcelona

Tournament statistics
- Matches played: 63
- Goals scored: 162 (2.57 per match)
- Attendance: 1,112,484 (17,658 per match)
- Top scorer(s): Roberto Baggio (Juventus); 9 goals

The 1990–91 season of the European Cup Winners' Cup was won by Manchester United against Barcelona. The victory for United was significant as it was the season English clubs returned to European football, after completing a five-year ban as a result of the Heysel Stadium disaster.

== Teams ==
A total of 33 teams participated in the competition. Yugoslav Cup winners Red Star Belgrade won the double, and cup runners-up Hajduk Split were disqualified, so no representative of Yugoslavia participated.

Qualified teams for 1990–91 European Cup Winners' Cup
First round
(Italy) Sampdoria^{TH}	(Italy) Juventus (CW)	(West Germany) 1. FC Kaiserslautern (CW)	(Spain) Barcelona (CW)
(Soviet Union) Dynamo Kyiv (CW)	(Belgium) Liège (CW)	(Netherlands) PSV Eindhoven (CW)	(Portugal) Estrela da Amadora (CW)
(Romania) Steaua București (CR)	(Scotland) Aberdeen (CW)	(Sweden) Djurgårdens IF (CW)	(France) Montpellier (CW)
Austria Wien (CW)	(East Germany) PSV Schwerin (CR)	(Czechoslovakia) Dukla Prague (CW)	(Hungary) Pécsi Mecsek (CW)
(Greece) Olympiacos (CW)	(Switzerland) Neuchâtel Xamax (CW)	(Denmark) Lyngby BK (CW)	(Wales) Wrexham (CR)
(Finland) KuPS (CW)	(Poland) Legia Warsaw (CW)	(Bulgaria) Sliven (CW)	(England) Manchester United (CW)
(Albania) KS Flamurtari (CR)	(Norway) Viking FK (CW)	(Northern Ireland) Glentoran (CW)	(Cyprus) Nea Salamis (CW)
(Iceland) Fram Reykjavík (CW)	(Malta) Sliema Wanderers (CW)	(Luxembourg) Swift Hesperange (CW)	
Qualifying round
(Turkey) Trabzonspor (CR)	(Republic of Ireland) Bray Wanderers (CW)		

Notes

1. East Germany (GDR): All matches of PSV Schwerin, representing the DFV of East Germany as runners-up of the 1989–90 FDGB-Pokal (as Dynamo Dresden won the double and qualified for the European Cup), on or after German reunification of 3 October show the flag of the reunited nation of Germany. However, those matches and their records were still counted for East Germany, and not for Germany, under UEFA regulations.

== Qualifying round ==
Team 1	Agg.	Team 2	1st leg	2nd leg
Bray Wanderers (Republic of Ireland)	1–3	(Turkey) Trabzonspor	1–1	0–2

=== First leg ===
19 August 1990

Bray Wanderers (Republic of Ireland)	1–1	(Turkey) Trabzonspor
Nugent 51'	Report	Đukić 2'

Tolka Park, Dublin
Attendance: 5,000
Referee: Michel Piraux (Belgium)

=== Second leg ===
4 September 1990

Trabzonspor (Turkey)	2–0	(Republic of Ireland) Bray Wanderers
Đukić 48'; Aslan 62'	Report

Hüseyin Avni Aker Stadium, Trabzon
Attendance: 17,000
Referee: Adrian Porumboiu (Romania)

Trabzonspor won 3–1 on aggregate.

== First round ==
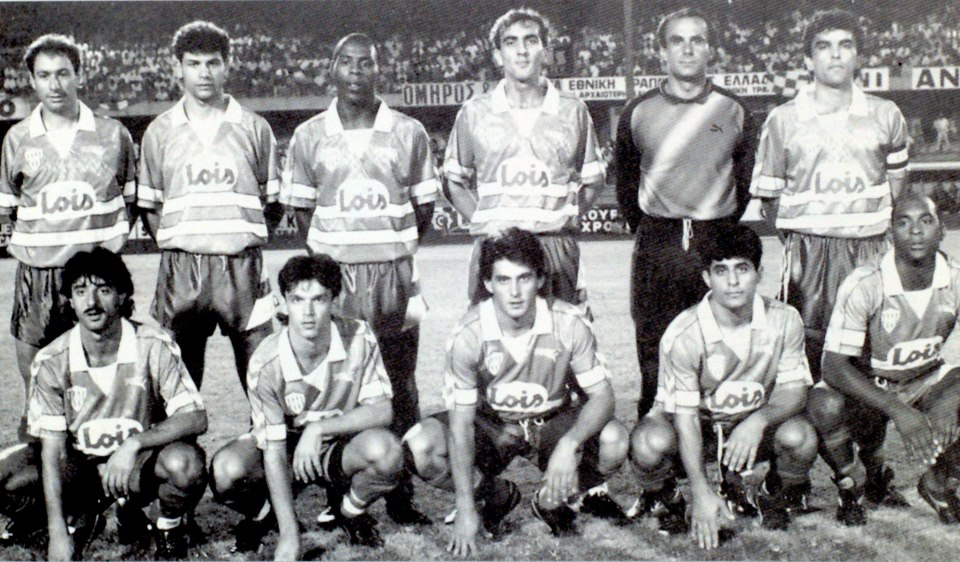
Nea Salamis Famagusta against Aberdeen at Tsirion Stadium in Limassol

Team 1	Agg.	Team 2	1st leg	2nd leg
Nea Salamis (Cyprus)	0–5	(Scotland) Aberdeen	0–2	0–3
Legia Warsaw (Poland)	6–0	(Luxembourg) Swift Hesperange	3–0	3–0
Olympiacos (Greece)	5–1	(Albania) Flamurtari	3–1	2–0
Kaiserslautern (Germany)	1–2	(Italy) Sampdoria	1–0	0–2
Manchester United (England)	3–0	(Hungary) Pécsi Munkás	2–0	1–0
Wrexham (Wales)	1–0	(Denmark) Lyngby	0–0	1–0
Montpellier (France)	1–0	(Netherlands) PSV Eindhoven	1–0	0–0
Glentoran (Northern Ireland)	1–6	(Romania) Steaua București	1–1	0–5
KuPS (Finland)	2–6	(Soviet Union) Dynamo Kyiv	2–2	0–4
Sliema Wanderers (Malta)	1–4	(Czechoslovakia) Dukla Prague	1–2	0–2
Fram (Iceland)	4–1	(Sweden) Djurgårdens IF	3–0	1–1
Trabzonspor (Turkey)	3–7	(Spain) Barcelona	1–0	2–7
Viking (Norway)	0–5	(Belgium) RFC Liège	0–2	0–3
Estrela da Amadora (Portugal)	2–2 (4–3 p)^{†}	(Switzerland) Neuchâtel Xamax	1–1	1–1 (aet)
PSV Schwerin (Germany)	0–2	Austria Wien	0–2	0–0
Sliven (Bulgaria)	1–8	(Italy) Juventus	0–2	1–6

^{†} Order of legs reversed after original draw

=== First leg ===
18 September 1990

Sliema Wanderers (Malta)	1–2	(Czechoslovakia) Dukla Prague
Walker 54'	Report	V. Rada 32'; J. Kostelník 87'

National Stadium, Attard
Attendance: 850
Referee: Rosario Lo Bello (Italy)

19 September 1990

Nea Salamis (Cyprus)	0–2	(Scotland) Aberdeen
	Report	Mason 62'; Gillhaus 81'

Tsirion Stadium, Limassol
Attendance: 7,000
Referee: Octavian Streng (Romania)

19 September 1990

Legia Warsaw (Poland)	3–0	(Luxembourg) Swift Hesperange
Kosecki 48', 79'; Pisz 90'	Report

Stadion Wojska Polskiego, Warsaw
Attendance: 4,172
Referee: Kaj Natri (Finland)

19 September 1990

Olympiacos (Greece)	3–1	(Albania) Flamurtari
Anastopoulos 9', 69'; Hantzidis 25'	Report	Ziu 75'

Karaiskakis Stadium, Piraeus
Attendance: 14,907
Referee: Atanas Uzunov (Bulgaria)

19 September 1990

Kaiserslautern (West Germany)	1–0	(Italy) Sampdoria
Kuntz 75'	Report

Fritz-Walter-Stadion, Kaiserslautern
Attendance: 32,674
Referee: John Blankenstein (Netherlands)

19 September 1990

Manchester United (England)	2–0	(Hungary) Pécsi Munkás
Blackmore 10'; Webb 17'	Report

Old Trafford, Manchester
Attendance: 28,411
Referee: Mario van der Ende (Netherlands)

19 September 1990

Wrexham (Wales)	0–0	(Denmark) Lyngby
	Report

Racecourse Ground, Wrexham
Attendance: 3,417
Referee: Frans van der Wijngaert (Belgium)

19 September 1990

Montpellier (France)	1–0	(Netherlands) PSV Eindhoven
Ziober 54'	Report

Stade de la Mosson, Montpellier
Attendance: 14,404
Referee: Karl-Josef Assenmacher (West Germany)

19 September 1990

Glentoran (Northern Ireland)	1–1	(Romania) Steaua București
Douglas 84'	Report	Stan 47' (pen.)

The Oval, Belfast
Attendance: 2,163
Referee: Tore Hollung (Norway)

19 September 1990

KuPS (Finland)	2–2	(Soviet Union) Dynamo Kyiv
K. Nyyssönen 38'; Gayle 90'	Report	Salenko 11'; Yuran 66'

Väinölänniemen stadion, Kuopio
Attendance: 2,460
Referee: Egil Nervik (Norway)

19 September 1990

Fram (Iceland)	3–0	(Sweden) Djurgårdens IF
Ragnarsson 55', 57'; Arnþórsson 89'	Report

Laugardalsvöllur, Reykjavík
Attendance: 637
Referee: Wilfred Wallace (Republic of Ireland)

19 September 1990

Trabzonspor (Turkey)	1–0	(Spain) Barcelona
Aslan 67'	Report

Hüseyin Avni Aker Stadium, Trabzon
Attendance: 21,352
Referee: Lajos Németh (Hungary)

19 September 1990

Viking (Norway)	0–2	(Belgium) RFC Liège
	Report	Boffin 15'; Ernès 82'

Stavanger Stadion, Stavanger
Attendance: 1,845
Referee: George Smith (Scotland)

19 September 1990

Estrela da Amadora (Portugal)	1–1	(Switzerland) Neuchâtel Xamax
Ricky 26'	Report	Sutter 57'

Estádio José Gomes, Amadora
Attendance: 6,000
Referee: Alphonse Constantin (Belgium)

19 September 1990

PSV Schwerin (East Germany)	0–2	Austria Wien
	Report	Miļevskis 34'; Zsak 36'

Ostseestadion, Rostock
Attendance: 835
Referee: John Nielsen (Denmark)

19 September 1990

Sliven (Bulgaria)	0–2	(Italy) Juventus
	Report	Schillaci 26'; Baggio 88' (pen.)

Stadion Hadzhi Dimitar, Sliven
Attendance: 17,600
Referee: Ignace van Swieten (Netherlands)

=== Second leg ===
3 October 1990

Aberdeen (Scotland)	3–0	(Cyprus) Nea Salamis
C. Robertson 13'; Gillhaus 33'; Jess 67'	Report

Pittodrie Stadium, Aberdeen
Attendance: 9,884
Referee: Andrew Ritchie (Northern Ireland)

Aberdeen won 5–0 on aggregate.

3 October 1990

Swift Hesperange (Luxembourg)	0–3	(Poland) Legia Warsaw
	Report	Jóźwiak 60'; Łatka 82'; Kosecki 88'

Stade de la Frontière, Esch-sur-Alzette
Attendance: 518
Referee: Hans-Peter Dellwing (Germany)

Legia Warsaw won 6–0 on aggregate.

3 October 1990

Flamurtari (Albania)	0–2	(Greece) Olympiacos
	Report	Christodoulou 84'; Mitropoulos 87'

Flamurtari Stadium, Vlorë
Attendance: 12,000
Referee: László Molnár (Hungary)

Olympiacos won 5–1 on aggregate.

3 October 1990

Sampdoria (Italy)	2–0	(Germany) Kaiserslautern
Mancini 6' (pen.); Branca 75'	Report

Stadio Luigi Ferraris, Genoa
Attendance: 29,994
Referee: Neil Midgley (England)

Sampdoria won 2–1 on aggregate.

3 October 1990

Pécsi Munkás (Hungary)	0–1	(England) Manchester United
	Report	McClair 78'

Stadion PMFC, Pécs
Attendance: 9,700
Referee: Zoran Petrović (Yugoslavia)

Manchester United won 3–0 on aggregate.

3 October 1990

Lyngby (Denmark)	0–1	(Wales) Wrexham
	Report	Armstrong 10'

Lyngby Stadion, Kongens Lyngby
Attendance: 1,548
Referee: Jiří Stiegler (Czechoslovakia)

Wrexham won 1–0 on aggregate.

3 October 1990

PSV Eindhoven (Netherlands)	0–0	(France) Montpellier
	Report

Philips Stadion, Eindhoven
Attendance: 24,500
Referee: Alexey Spirin (Soviet Union)

Montpellier won 1–0 on aggregate.

3 October 1990

Steaua București (Romania)	5–0	(Northern Ireland) Glentoran
Stan 21'; Dumitrescu 37', 45'; Petrescu 80', 88'	Report

Stadionul Steaua, Bucharest
Attendance: 4,700
Referee: Arsen Hoxha (Albania)

Steaua București won 6–1 on aggregate.

3 October 1990

Dynamo Kyiv (Soviet Union)	4–0	(Finland) KuPS
Salenko 14'; Lytovchenko 25', 54'; Yuran 85'	Report

Republican Stadium, Kyiv
Attendance: 28,500
Referee: Sadık Deda (Turkey)

Dynamo Kyiv won 6–2 on aggregate.

3 October 1990

Dukla Prague (Czechoslovakia)	2–0	(Malta) Sliema Wanderers
Walker 47' (o.g.); Záleský 73'	Report

Stadion Juliska, Prague
Attendance: 677
Referee: Ernest Kesseler (Luxembourg)

Dukla Prague won 4–1 on aggregate.

3 October 1990

Djurgårdens IF (Sweden)	1–1	(Iceland) Fram
Martinsson 81'	Report	Ormslev 9' (pen.)

Råsunda fotbollsstadion, Solna
Attendance: 956
Referee: Eero Aho (Finland)

Fram won 4–1 on aggregate.

3 October 1990

Barcelona (Spain)	7–2	(Turkey) Trabzonspor
Begiristain 13'; Amor 29'; Koeman 32', 40', 76' (pen.); Stoichkov 44', 87'	Report	Hami 7'; Boz 68'

Estadi del Futbol Club Barcelona, Barcelona
Attendance: 35,000
Referee: Joe Worrall (England)

Barcelona won 7–3 on aggregate.

3 October 1990

RFC Liège (Belgium)	3–0	(Norway) Viking
Boffin 22', 35', 88'	Report

Stade Vélodrome de Rocourt, Liège
Attendance: 2,570
Referee: José Veiga Trigo (Portugal)

RFC Liège won 5–0 on aggregate.

3 October 1990

Neuchâtel Xamax (Switzerland)	1–1 (a.e.t.)	(Portugal) Estrela da Amadora
Sutter 49'	Report	Valério 82'
Penalties
Sutter (penalty scored); Gigon (penalty scored); Fernandez (penalty scored); Froidevaux (penalty missed); Egli (penalty missed)	3–4	(penalty scored) Valério; (penalty scored) Rui Neves; (penalty scored) Dimas; (penalty scored) Paulo Jorge

Stade de la Maladière, Neuchâtel
Attendance: 12,400
Referee: Dušan Krchňák (Czechoslovakia)

2–2 on aggregate. Estrela da Amadora won 4–3 on penalties.

3 October 1990

Austria Wien	0–0	(Germany) PSV Schwerin
	Report

Franz-Horr-Stadion, Vienna
Attendance: 1,150
Referee: Zdravko Đokić (Yugoslavia)

Austria Wien won 2–0 on aggregate.

3 October 1990

Juventus (Italy)	6–1	(Bulgaria) Sliven
Baggio 15' (pen.), 18'; Schillaci 25'; Corini 49'; Bonetti 52'; Júlio César 56'	Report	Kelepov 85'

Stadio delle Alpi, Turin
Attendance: 9,765
Referee: David Syme (Scotland)

Juventus won 8–1 on aggregate.

== Second round ==
Team 1	Agg.	Team 2	1st leg	2nd leg
Aberdeen (Scotland)	0–1	(Poland) Legia Warsaw	0–0	0–1
Olympiacos (Greece)	1–4	(Italy) Sampdoria	0–1	1–3
Manchester United (England)	5–0	(Wales) Wrexham	3–0	2–0
Montpellier (France)	8–0	(Romania) Steaua București	5–0	3–0
Dynamo Kyiv (Soviet Union)	3–2	(Czechoslovakia) Dukla Prague	1–0	2–2
Fram (Iceland)	1–5	(Spain) Barcelona	1–2	0–3
RFC Liège (Belgium)	2–1	(Portugal) Estrela da Amadora	2–0	0–1
Austria Wien	0–8	(Italy) Juventus	0–4	0–4

=== First leg ===
23 October 1990

Manchester United (England)	3–0	(Wales) Wrexham
McClair 42'; Bruce 44' (pen.); Pallister 59'	Report

Old Trafford, Manchester
Attendance: 29,406
Referee: Antonio Martín Navarrete (Spain)

23 October 1990

Fram (Iceland)	1–2	(Spain) Barcelona
Daðason 60'	Report	Salinas 32'; Stoichkov 86'

Laugardalsvöllur, Reykjavík
Attendance: 1,321
Referee: Rodger Gifford (Wales)

24 October 1990

Aberdeen (Scotland)	0–0	(Poland) Legia Warsaw
	Report

Pittodrie Stadium, Aberdeen
Attendance: 15,946
Referee: José Francisco Silva (Portugal)

24 October 1990

Olympiacos (Greece)	0–1	(Italy) Sampdoria
	Report	Katanec 53'

Karaiskakis Stadium, Piraeus
Attendance: 14,289
Referee: George Courtney (England)

24 October 1990

Montpellier (France)	5–0	(Romania) Steaua București
Ziober 27', 63'; Xuereb 51'; Blanc 56' (pen.); Castro 81'	Report

Stade de la Mosson, Montpellier
Attendance: 18,869
Referee: Carlos Silva Valente (Portugal)

24 October 1990

Dynamo Kyiv (Soviet Union)	1–0	(Czechoslovakia) Dukla Prague
Lytovchenko 65'	Report

Republican Stadium, Kyiv
Attendance: 42,500
Referee: Borislav Aleksandrov (Bulgaria)

24 October 1990

RFC Liège (Belgium)	2–0	(Portugal) Estrela da Amadora
Malbaša 7'; Milošević 86'	Report

Stade Vélodrome de Rocourt, Liège
Attendance: 4,809
Referee: Wieland Ziller (Germany)

24 October 1990

Austria Wien	0–4	(Italy) Juventus
	Report	Casiraghi 30', 45'; Baggio 49'; Schillaci 70' (pen.)

Praterstadion, Vienna
Attendance: 12,000
Referee: Guy Goethals (Belgium)

=== Second leg ===
7 November 1990

Legia Warsaw (Poland)	1–0	(Scotland) Aberdeen
Iwanicki 85'	Report

Stadion Wojska Polskiego, Warsaw
Attendance: 5,665
Referee: Leif Sundell (Sweden)

Legia Warsaw won 1–0 on aggregate.

7 November 1990

Sampdoria (Italy)	3–1	(Greece) Olympiacos
Lombardo 17'; Branca 29', 66'	Report	Drakopoulos 62'

Stadio Luigi Ferraris, Genoa
Attendance: 23,745
Referee: Emilio Soriano Aladrén (Spain)

Sampdoria won 4–1 on aggregate.

7 November 1990

Wrexham (Wales)	0–2	(England) Manchester United
	Report	Robins 31'; Bruce 35'

Racecourse Ground, Wrexham
Attendance: 13,327
Referee: Kim Milton Nielsen (Denmark)

Manchester United won 5–0 on aggregate.

7 November 1990

Steaua București (Romania)	0–3	(France) Montpellier
	Report	Colleter 52'; Garande 71'; Guérin 82'

Stadionul Steaua, Bucharest
Attendance: 2,188
Referee: Erik Fredriksson (Sweden)

Montpellier won 8–0 on aggregate.

7 November 1990

Dukla Prague (Czechoslovakia)	2–2	(Soviet Union) Dynamo Kyiv
Foldyna 51'; Bittengel 72'	Report	Yuran 6', 60'

Stadion Juliska, Prague
Attendance: 2,191
Referee: Borislav Aleksandrov (Bulgaria)

Dynamo Kyiv won 3–2 on aggregate.

7 November 1990

Barcelona (Spain)	3–0	(Iceland) Fram
Eusebio 17'; Begiristain 33'; Pinilla 69'	Report

Estadi del Futbol Club Barcelona, Barcelona
Attendance: 17,300
Referee: Stavros Zakestidis (Greece)

Barcelona won 5–1 on aggregate.

7 November 1990

Estrela da Amadora (Portugal)	1–0	(Belgium) RFC Liège
Duílio 32'	Report

Estádio José Gomes, Amadora
Attendance: 10,000
Referee: John Spillane (Republic of Ireland)

RFC Liège won 2–1 on aggregate.

7 November 1990

Juventus (Italy)	4–0	Austria Wien
Alessio 3'; Baggio 25' (pen.), 46', 52'	Report

Stadio delle Alpi, Turin
Attendance: 12,082
Referee: Bruno Galler (Switzerland)

Juventus won 8–0 on aggregate.

== Quarter-finals ==
Team 1	Agg.	Team 2	1st leg	2nd leg
Legia Warsaw (Poland)	3–2	(Italy) Sampdoria	1–0	2–2
Manchester United (England)	3–1	(France) Montpellier	1–1	2–0
Dynamo Kyiv (Soviet Union)	3–4	(Spain) Barcelona	2–3	1–1
RFC Liège (Belgium)	1–6	(Italy) Juventus	1–3	0–3

=== First leg ===
6 March 1991

Legia Warsaw (Poland)	1–0	(Italy) Sampdoria
Czykier 44'	Report

Stadion Wojska Polskiego, Warsaw
Attendance: 7,028
Referee: Serge Muhmenthaler (Switzerland)

6 March 1991

Manchester United (England)	1–1	(France) Montpellier
McClair 1'	Report	Martin 7' (o.g.)

Old Trafford, Manchester
Attendance: 41,942
Referee: Pierluigi Pairetto (Italy)

6 March 1991

Dynamo Kyiv (Soviet Union)	2–3	(Spain) Barcelona
Zayets 33'; Salenko 81' (pen.)	Report	Bakero 5'; Urbano 45'; Stoichkov 63' (pen.)

Republican Stadium, Kyiv
Attendance: 96,000
Referee: David Syme (Scotland)

6 March 1991

RFC Liège (Belgium)	1–3	(Italy) Juventus
Houben 83'	Report	Wégria 32' (o.g.); Baggio 43'; Júlio César 47'

Stade Vélodrome de Rocourt, Liège
Attendance: 16,463
Referee: Aron Schmidhuber (Germany)

=== Second leg ===
19 March 1991

Montpellier (France)	0–2	(England) Manchester United
	Report	Blackmore 45'; Bruce 49' (pen.)

Stade de la Mosson, Montpellier
Attendance: 20,433
Referee: Hubert Forstinger (Austria)

Manchester United won 3–1 on aggregate.

20 March 1991

Sampdoria (Italy)	2–2	(Poland) Legia Warsaw
Mancini 67'; Vialli 88'	Report	Kowalczyk 19', 54'

Stadio Luigi Ferraris, Genoa
Attendance: 25,860
Referee: Wieland Ziller (Germany)

Legia Warsaw won 3–2 on aggregate.

20 March 1991

Barcelona (Spain)	1–1	(Soviet Union) Dynamo Kyiv
Amor 90'	Report	Yuran 62'

Estadi del Futbol Club Barcelona, Barcelona
Attendance: 37,000
Referee: Zoran Petrović (Yugoslavia)

Barcelona won 4–3 on aggregate.

20 March 1991

Juventus (Italy)	3–0	(Belgium) RFC Liège
Casiraghi 9'; Houben 18' (o.g.); Häßler 22'	Report

Stadio delle Alpi, Turin
Attendance: 20,641
Referee: Howard King (Wales)

Juventus won 6–1 on aggregate.

== Semi-finals ==
Team 1	Agg.	Team 2	1st leg	2nd leg
Legia Warsaw (Poland)	2–4	(England) Manchester United	1–3	1–1
Barcelona (Spain)	3–2	(Italy) Juventus	3–1	0–1

=== First leg ===
10 April 1991

Legia Warsaw (Poland)	1–3	(England) Manchester United
Cyzio 37'	Report	McClair 38'; Hughes 54'; Bruce 68'

Stadion Wojska Polskiego, Warsaw
Attendance: 16,000
Referee: Alphonse Constantin (Belgium)

10 April 1991

Barcelona (Spain)	3–1	(Italy) Juventus
Stoichkov 58', 61'; Goikoetxea 77'	Report	Casiraghi 13'

Estadi del Futbol Club Barcelona, Barcelona
Attendance: 98,000
Referee: Joël Quiniou (France)

=== Second leg ===
24 April 1991

Manchester United (England)	1–1	(Poland) Legia Warsaw
Sharpe 29'	Report	Kowalczyk 56'

Old Trafford, Manchester
Attendance: 44,269
Referee: Aron Schmidhuber (Germany)

Manchester United won 4–2 on aggregate.

24 April 1991

Juventus (Italy)	1–0	(Spain) Barcelona
Baggio 61'	Report

Stadio delle Alpi, Turin
Attendance: 64,469
Referee: Kurt Röthlisberger (Switzerland)

Barcelona won 3–2 on aggregate.

== Final ==
15 May 1991

Manchester United (England)	2–1	(Spain) Barcelona
Hughes 67', 74'	Report	Koeman 79'

Stadion Feijenoord, Rotterdam
Attendance: 43,500
Referee: Bo Karlsson (Sweden)

== Top goalscorers ==
The top scorers from the 1990–91 European Cup Winners' Cup are as follows:

Rank	Name	Team	Goals
1	(Italy) Roberto Baggio	(Italy) Juventus	9
2	(Bulgaria) Hristo Stoichkov	(Spain) Barcelona	6
3	(Soviet Union) Sergei Yuran	(Soviet Union) Dynamo Kyiv	5
4	(Belgium) Danny Boffin	(Belgium) Liège	4
4	(England) Steve Bruce	(England) Manchester United	4
4	(Italy) Pierluigi Casiraghi	(Italy) Juventus	4
4	(Netherlands) Ronald Koeman	(Spain) Barcelona	4
4	(Scotland) Brian McClair	(England) Manchester United	4
9	(Italy) Marco Branca	(Italy) Sampdoria	3
9	(Wales) Mark Hughes	(England) Manchester United	3
9	(Poland) Roman Kosecki	(Poland) Legia Warsaw	3
9	(Poland) Wojciech Kowalczyk	(Poland) Legia Warsaw	3
9	(Soviet Union) Oleg Salenko	(Soviet Union) Dynamo Kyiv	3
9	(Italy) Salvatore Schillaci	(Italy) Juventus	3
9	(Poland) Jacek Ziober	(France) Montpellier	3
