= Montpellier HSC in European football =

French club in European football

- Club: Montpellier HSC
- First entry: 1988–89 UEFA Cup
- Latest entry: 2012–13 UEFA Champions League

Titles
- Champions League: 0
- Europa League: 0
- Cup Winners' Cup: 0
- Intertoto Cup: 1
- Super Cup: 0

This article lists results for French association football team Montpellier HSC in European competition.

== Participations ==
As of 4 December 2012, Montpellier have competed in:

- 1 participation in the European Cup / UEFA Champions League
- 1 participation in the UEFA Cup Winners' Cup
- 4 participations in the UEFA Cup / UEFA Europa League
- 2 participations in the UEFA Intertoto Cup / UEFA Intertoto Cup

=== Record by competition ===
As of 4 December 2012

Competition	Played	Won	Drawn	Lost	Goals for	Goals against
UEFA Champions League	6	0	2	4	6	12
UEFA Cup Winners' Cup	6	3	2	1	10	3
UEFA Europa League	10	2	2	6	7	15
UEFA Intertoto Cup	16	8	4	4	31	14
Total	38	13	10	15	54	44

== Matches in Europe ==
Season	Competition	Round	Country	Club	Score
1988–89	UEFA Cup	First round	POR	S.L. Benfica	0–3 (H), 1–3 (A)
1990–91	Cup Winners' Cup	First round	NED	PSV Eindhoven	1–0 (H), 0–0 (A)
1990–91	Cup Winners' Cup	Second round	ROM	Steaua București	5–0 (H), 3–0 (A)
1990–91	Cup Winners' Cup	Quarter-final	ENG	Manchester United	1–1 (A), 0–2 (H)
1996–97	UEFA Cup	First Round	POR	Sporting CP	1–1 (H), 0–1 (A)
1997	UEFA Intertoto Cup	Group 10	ROM	Gloria Bistrita	1–2 (A)
1997	UEFA Intertoto Cup	Group 10	FR Yugoslavia	FK Čukarički	3–1 (H)
1997	UEFA Intertoto Cup	Group 10	BUL	Spartak Varna	1–1 (A)
1997	UEFA Intertoto Cup	Group 10	NED	Groningen	3–0 (H)
1997	UEFA Intertoto Cup	Semifinals	GER	FC Koln	1–0 (H), 1–2 (A)
1997	UEFA Intertoto Cup	Finals	FRA	Olympique Lyonnais	0–1 (H), 2–3 (A)
1999	UEFA Intertoto Cup	Second round	AZE	Qarabağ	6–0 (H), 3–0 (A)
1999	UEFA Intertoto Cup	Third round	ESP	Espanyol	2–1 (H), 2–0 (A)
1999	UEFA Intertoto Cup	Semi finals	GER	Duisburg	3–0 (A), 1–1 (H)
1999	UEFA Intertoto Cup	Finals	GER	SV Hamburg	1–1 (A), 1–1 (H)
1999–2000	UEFA Cup	First Round	FR Yugoslavia	Red Star Belgrade	1–0 (A), 2–2 (H)
1999–2000	UEFA Cup	Second Round	ESP	Deportivo de La Coruña	1–3 (A), 0–2 (H)
2010–11	Europa League	Third qualifying round	HUN	Győr	1–0 (A), 0–1 (H)
2012–13	Champions League	Group B	ENG	Arsenal	1–2 (H), 0–2 (A)
2012–13	Champions League	Group B	GER	Schalke 04	2–2 (A), 1–1 (H)
2012–13	Champions League	Group B	GRE	Olympiacos	1–2 (H), 1–3 (A)
