= Heyligen =

Heyligen is a surname. Notable people with the surname include:

- Jos Heyligen (born 1947), Belgian footballer
- Lodewijk Heyligen (1304–1361), Flemish Benedictine monk and music theorist
