= KVC Westerlo =

Belgian football club

Westerlo
- Full name: Koninklijke Voetbal Club; Westerlo
- Nickname: De Kemphanen (The Campine roosters)
- Founded: 5 September 1933; 93 years ago
- Ground: Het Kuipje
- Capacity: 8,035
- Chairman: Oktay Ercan
- Head coach: Issame Charaï
- League: Belgian Pro League
- 2025–26: Belgian Pro League, 10th of 16
- Website: www.kvcwesterlo.be
Home colours	Away colours	Third colours

Koninklijke Voetbal Club Westerlo (Dutch pronunciation: [ˈkoːnɪŋkləkə ˈvudbɑl ˌklʏp ˈʋɛstərloː]; often simply called Westerlo) is a Belgian professional football club located in the municipality of Westerlo in the province of Antwerp. Since 1997–98, Westerlo has been mostly playing in the Belgian Pro League, save for a short stint in the Belgian Second Division between 2012 and 2014, and another between 2017 and 2022. Their highest finish is a 6th place in 1999–00, 2003–04 and 2008–09. They have won one Belgian Cup. The only player who has ever been called up for the Belgium national football team while at Westerlo is Toni Brogno (7 caps, all of them while at Westerlo).

The club was founded in 1933, receiving the matricule number 2024. Their colours are yellow and blue. They play their home matches at the Het Kuipje.

== History ==
K.V.C. Westerlo was founded in the town of Westerlo by students in 1917, and it was named Sportkring De Bist Westerlo. After five years of existence, the club retired. The club Bist Sport was created in 1931 and it changed its name to Sportkring Westerlo two years later. At that time. some players left the club to found Westerlo Sport, the ancestor of K.V.C. Westerlo. In 1939, the club won its league for the first time. Five years later, Sportkring Westerlo and dissident Westerlo Sport decided to merge in spite of the rivalry between the teams, and the new club was called V.C. Westerlo.

It became champion of the Antwerp second division in 1960. Eight years later it played its first season at the national level in Promotion and it won its league to play the third division in 1969. At the end of the season, Westerlo missed a third title in a row, finishing second behind Eupen. The next year, the club was relegated after the playoff and it stayed in the Promotion for ten seasons. The club then underwent two relegations in a row and thus played in the Antwerp second division in 1982–83. Westerlo was then promoted for three consecutive years to qualify for the third division once again. In 1993, the club promoted to the second division and then to the first division in 1997. In 1996, the club added the prefix Koninklijke (meaning "Royal" in Dutch) to its name.

On 18 June 2019 it was officially announced that the club was taken over by Turkish businessman Oktay Ercan. He immediately made it clear that KVC Westerlo will remain a regional family club, and that more attention will be paid to the social dimension and sporting ambitions. Ercan expressed his commitment in 2019 to a year-long plan called 'KVC Westerlo 2024'.

== Stadium ==
Westerlo plays its home matches at Het Kuipje. Its capacity is 8,035.

== Honours ==
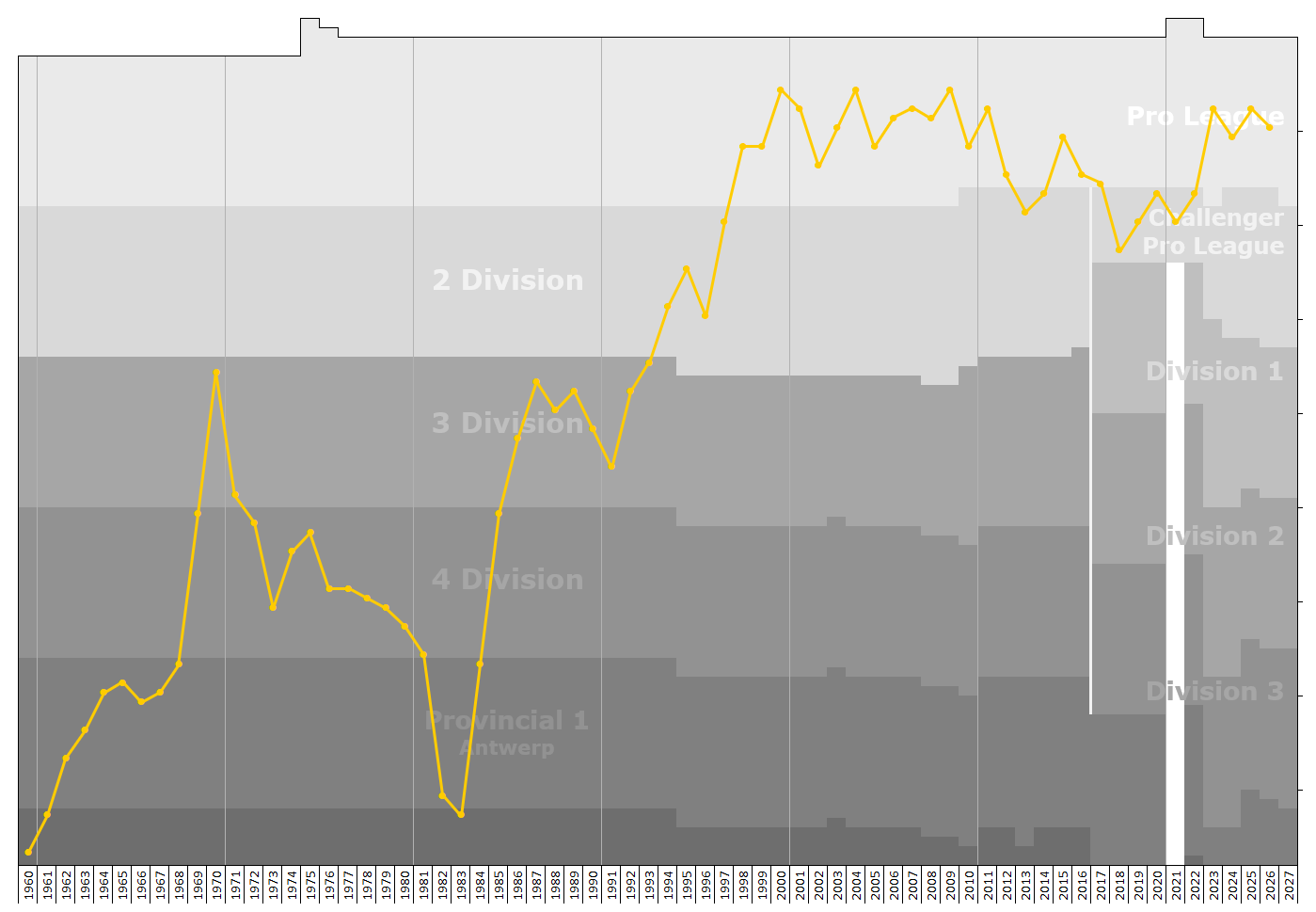
Historical chart of KVC Westerlo league performance

- Belgian Second Division/Belgian First Division B
  - Winners (2): 2013–14, 2021–22
  - Runners-up (1): 1996–97
- Belgian Second Division final round
  - Winners (1): 1997
- Belgian Cup:
  - Winners (1): 2000–01
  - Runners-up (1): 2010–11
- Belgian Supercup
  - Runners-up (1): 2001

== European record ==
Competition	Appearances	Matches	Won	Drawn	Lost	GF	GA
UEFA Cup / Europa League	2	6	1	1	4	2	8
UEFA Intertoto Cup	2	4	0	1	3	0	14

Season	Competition	Round	Opponent	Home	Away
2000	UEFA Intertoto Cup	1R	(Slovenia) Primorje	0–6	0–5
2001–02	UEFA Cup	1R	(Germany) Hertha Berlin	0–2	0–1
2004	UEFA Intertoto Cup	2R	(Czech Republic) Tescoma Zlín	0–0	0–3
2011–12	UEFA Europa League	Q2	(Finland) TPS Turku	0–0	1–0
2011–12	UEFA Europa League	Q3	(Switzerland) Young Boys	0–2	1–3

== Current squad ==
As of 9 September 2026

Note: Flags indicate national team as defined under FIFA eligibility rules; some limited exceptions apply. Players may hold more than one non-FIFA nationality.

No.	Pos.	Nation	Player
1	GK	BEL	Bill Lathouwers
2	DF	DEN	Lasse Flø
4	DF	BEL	Amando Lapage
5	DF	JPN	Seiji Kimura
6	DF	GER	Reno Münz
7	FW	JPN	Shunsuke Saito
8	MF	UKR	Serhiy Sydorchuk
9	FW	BEL	Norman Bassette (on loan from Coventry City)
10	FW	BEL	Nikola Storm
11	FW	MAR	Naoufal Bohamdi-Kamoni
12	MF	MAR	Reda Laalaoui
13	MF	JPN	Isa Sakamoto
14	MF	BEL	Cisse Sandra
17	FW	FRA	David Amegnaglo
20	FW	WAL	Cameron Congreve

No.	Pos.	Nation	Player
21	GK	SUR	Jahnilo Wiegel-Triebel
22	FW	SUI	Emmanuel Tsimba
23	DF	BEL	Lucas Mbamba
24	DF	BEL	Michée Ndembi
25	FW	CIV	Abdoulaye Koné
26	MF	SEN	Pape Diong
28	DF	FRA	Dylan Ourega
34	MF	TUR	Doğucan Haspolat (captain)
39	MF	BEL	Thomas Van den Keybus
40	DF	HUN	Botond Balogh
45	MF	CIV	Ibrahim Fofana
47	FW	KOR	Yang Min-hyeok (on loan from Tottenham Hotspur)
71	MF	CMR	Philippe Bibout
88	DF	BEL	Fabio Ferraro
99	GK	DEN	Andreas Jungdal

=== Out on loan ===
Note: Flags indicate national team as defined under FIFA eligibility rules; some limited exceptions apply. Players may hold more than one non-FIFA nationality.

No.	Pos.	Nation	Player
—	GK	BEL	Oskar Annell (at Houtvenne until 30 June 2027)

== Coaching staff ==
Position	Staff
Head coach	(Morocco) Issame Charaï
Assistant coach(es)	(Belgium) Bart Goor (Belgium) Kevin Van Haesendonck
Goalkeeping coach(es)	(Belgium) Paul Peeters (Serbia) Vladan Kujović
Fitness coach	(Belgium) Damien Broothaerts
Head of scouting	(Belgium) Niel Cuijvers
Scout	(Belgium) Francesco Carratta (Belgium) Stan Van den Buijs

== Managers ==
- (Belgium) Louis Leysen (1982–84)
- (Belgium) Jos Heyligen (1984–86)
- (Belgium) Marcel Corens (1986–88)
- (Belgium) Dirk Verbraken (1989)
- (Belgium) Raymond Jaspers (1989)
- (Belgium) Dirk Verbraken (1990–92)
- (Belgium) Jos Heyligen (1992–93)
- (Belgium) Werner Helsen (1993)
- (Belgium) Stef Verelst (1993)
- (Netherlands) Barry Hulshoff (1994–95)
- (Belgium) Erwin Vandenbergh (1995)
- (Belgium) Franky Dekenne (1996)
- (Belgium) Jos Heyligen (1996–99)
- (Belgium) Jan Ceulemans (1 July 1999 – 30 June 2005)
- (Belgium) Herman Helleputte (1 July 2005 – 30 June 2007)
- (Belgium) Jan Ceulemans (1 July 2007 – 19 May 2012)
- (Belgium) Frank Dauwen (22 May 2012 – 18 April 2013)
- (Netherlands) Dennis Van Wijk (1 May 2013 – 3 January 2015)
- (Belgium) Harm van Veldhoven (6 January 2015 – 25 November 2015)
- (Belgium) Bob Peeters (26 November 2015 – 13 September 2016)
- (Belgium) Jacky Mathijssen (14 September 2016 – 20 June 2017)
- (Bosnia and Herzegovina) Vedran Pelić (21 June 2017 – 4 December 2017)
- (Belgium) Bob Peeters (5 December 2017 – 30 June 2021)
- (Belgium) Jonas De Roeck (1 July 2021 – 2 December 2023)
- (Belgium) Bart Goor (3 December 2023 – 11 December 2023) (caretaker)
- (Belgium) Rik De Mil (12 December 2023 – 18 March 2024)
- (Belgium) Bart Goor (19 March 2024 – 30 June 2024) (caretaker)
- (Belgium) Timmy Simons (Since 1 July 2024)
