= Adão (footballer) =

Portuguese footballer

Personal information
- Full name: Carlos Manuel Pereira Pinto
- Date of birth: 3 April 1960 (age 66)
- Place of birth: Chaves, Portugal
- Height: 1.80 m (5 ft 11 in)
- Position: Midfielder

Youth career
- 1975–1977: Chaves
- 1977–1978: Porto

Senior career*
Years	Team	Apps	(Gls)
1978–1980	Chaves	27	(3)
1980–1985	Varzim	109	(10)
1985–1988	Vitória Guimarães	86	(5)
1988–1990	Belenenses	52	(1)
1990–1995	Penafiel	136	(8)
Total		410	(27)

International career
1979	Portugal U20	5	(0)
1986–1989	Portugal	11	(0)
- * Club domestic league appearances and goals

Carlos Manuel Pereira Pinto (born 3 April 1960), commonly known as Adão, is a Portuguese former professional footballer who played as a central midfielder.

== Club career ==
Born in Chaves, Vila Real District, Adão started his career with hometown club G.D. Chaves, moving to the Primeira Liga in 1980 with Varzim SC. He appeared in only eight games in his first season, which ended in relegation, but helped with 27 and three goals to an immediate promotion.

In summer 1985, Adão joined Vitória de Guimarães. In his second year he played 30 matches as starter and scored twice – including once in 1–0 away win over S.C. Braga in the Minho derby – as his team finished in third position.

Adão signed with C.F. Os Belenenses for 1988–89. On 12 October 1988, in that campaign's UEFA Cup, he scored the game's only goal at home against Bayer 04 Leverkusen, as the Lisbon side ousted the title holders 2–0 on aggregate. Later in the season he also appeared in the final of the Taça de Portugal, won after beating S.L. Benfica.

Aged 30, Adão moved to F.C. Penafiel, spending his last three years (of five overall) in the Segunda Liga. Over the course of 11 seasons, he amassed top-tier totals of 279 games and 16 goals.

== International career ==
Adão earned 11 caps for Portugal, nine of which came after the 1986 FIFA World Cup as practically all of the national team had defected following the infamous Saltillo Affair. His debut came, however, prior to the tournament in Mexico, in a friendly against Finland on 22 January 1986 (1–1 home draw).

Previously, Adão was part of the under-20 side that reached the quarterfinals at the 1979 FIFA World Youth Championship in Japan, making three appearances.
