= Mikel Loinaz =

Spanish footballer

Personal information
- Full name: Mikel Loinaz Balda
- Date of birth: 28 March 1967 (age 59)
- Place of birth: Andoain, Spain
- Height: 1.84 m (6 ft 0 in)
- Position: Forward

Youth career
- Azparren

Senior career*
Years	Team	Apps	(Gls)
1986–1988	Real Sociedad B	42	(6)
1986–1993	Real Sociedad	48	(12)
1993–1994	Villarreal	30	(1)
1994–1997	Eibar	68	(13)
1997–1999	Leça	36	(3)
1999–2000	Sabadell	25	(4)
2000–2001	Ontinyent		
2001–2004	Santa Eulàlia		
- * Club domestic league appearances and goals

Mikel Loinaz Balda (born 28 March 1967) is a Spanish former professional footballer who played as a forward.

He appeared in 48 La Liga matches for Real Sociedad over six seasons, scoring 12 goals.

== Career ==
Born in Andoain, Gipuzkoa, Loinaz started playing amateur football in France before signing with Real Sociedad in 1986 and being assigned to their reserves. He made his La Liga debut on 16 November that year when he came on as a late substitute in a 2–0 home win against CA Osasuna, and scored his first goal on 11 September 1988 to close the 2–1 victory over Real Betis also at the Atotxa Stadium. Additionally, he netted four times in the 1988–89 edition of the UEFA Cup, helping his team to reach the quarter-finals.

Loinaz took his game to Segunda División after leaving Real in the 1993 off-season, representing Villarreal CF and SD Eibar. After two years in Portugal with Leça FC (in both the Primeira and Segunda Liga) he returned to his country, seeing out his career at the age of 37 with Tercera División club Peña Deportiva Santa Eulàlia.
