= Paulo Jorge (footballer, born 1963) =

Portuguese footballer and coach

Personal information
- Full name: Paulo Jorge Roque Marques
- Date of birth: 22 February 1963 (age 63)
- Place of birth: Loures, Portugal
- Height: 1.77 m (5 ft 9 1/2 in)
- Position: Forward

Youth career
- 1978–1979: Loures
- 1979–1980: Fanhões
- 1980–1981: Olivais e Moscavide

Senior career*
Years	Team	Apps	(Gls)
1981–1984	Olivais e Moscavide		
1984–1985	Vialonga		
1985–1987	Samora Correia		
1987–1991	Estrela Amadora		
1991–1993	Vitória Guimarães	31	(2)
1993–1995	União Madeira	20	(0)
1995–1996	Varzim	35	(2)
1996–1997	Fanhões		

Managerial career
- 1996: Fanhões
- 1997–1998: Fanhões
- * Club domestic league appearances and goals

Paulo Jorge Roque Marques, known as Paulo Jorge (born 22 February 1963) is a former Portuguese football player and coach.

== Club career ==
He made 7 seasons and 138 games in the Primeira Liga for Estrela Amadora, Vitória Guimarães and União Madeira.

== Honours ==
Estrela Amadora

- Taça de Portugal: 1989–90
