= SL Fanhões =

Portuguese sports club

- Full name: Sport Luz e Fanhões
- Founded: 1942
- Dissolved: 2014
- League: II AF Lisboa
- 2013–14: 11th (of 14)

Sport Luz e Fanhões was a Portuguese sports club from Fanhões, Loures.

The men's football team played on the third tier of Portuguese football, the Segunda Divisão B, from 1991 to 1999, later ending last in the 2000–01 Terceira Divisão and suffering relegation to the fifth tier. In 2013–14 the team finished lowly in the second district tier of AF Lisboa, not to return after that.
