= György Katona (footballer, born 1960) =

Hungarian footballer

Personal information
- Full name: György Katona
- Date of birth: 16 April 1960 (age 66)
- Place of birth: Budapest, Hungary
- Position: Left winger

Senior career*
Years	Team	Apps	(Gls)
- III. Kerületi TVE
1981–1982	Volán FC		
1982–1983	H. Rákóczi SE		
1983–1985	Vasas SC	29	(2)
1985–1986	Volán FC	29	(6)
1986–1990	Újpest FC	94	(18)
1990–1992	FC Haka	65	(12)
1992–1993	Újpest FC	5	(0)
1993–1994	FC Haka	31	(5)

International career
1988–1990	Hungary	2	(0)
- * Club domestic league appearances and goals

György Katona (born 16 April 1960) is a former Hungarian professional footballer who played as a left winger. He was a member of the Hungary national team.

== Career ==
He started playing football for Dunakeszi VSE. After that he played for the III. Kerületi TVE and then for the Volán FC. During his military service he played football for H. Rákóczi SE. Between 1983 and 1985 he played for Vasas SC, from 1985 to 1986 for Volán FC. From 1986 to 1990 he played for Újpest FC, where he was a member of the 1987 Hungarian Cup winning team.

In 1990 he was a member of the team that won the championship. In 1990 he signed for the Finnish team FC Haka.

=== National team ===
Between 1988 and 1990, he played twice for the national team.

== Honours ==
- Nemzeti Bajnokság I (NB I)
  - Champion: 1990
- Magyar Kupa (MNK)
  - Winner: 1987
