= Georgios Christodoulou =

Cypriot footballer (born 1965)

Personal information
- Full name: Georgios Christodoulou
- Date of birth: August 22, 1965 (age 61)
- Place of birth: Nicosia, Cyprus
- Height: 1.78 m (5 ft 10 in)
- Position: Defender

Senior career*
Years	Team	Apps	(Gls)
1986–1990	Omonia	76	(6)
1990–1993	Olympiacos	35	(3)
1993–1995	Omonia	50	(0)
1995–2002	APOEL	141	(7)
Total		302	(16)

International career^{‡}
1984–1999	Cyprus	39	(0)
- * Club domestic league appearances and goals as of 17 April 2008 ‡ National team caps and goals as of 17 April 2008

Georgios Christodoulou (Greek: Γεώργιος Χριστοδούλου) (born August 22, 1965) is a former international Cypriot football defender.

He played for Omonia, Olympiacos and APOEL.
