= Jos Heyligen =

Belgian footballer

Personal information
- Full name: Jozef Heyligen
- Date of birth: 30 June 1947 (age 79)
- Place of birth: Oostham, Belgium
- Height: 1.80 m (5 ft 11 in)
- Position: Midfielder

Youth career
- 1958–1966: VV Oostham

Senior career*
Years	Team	Apps	(Gls)
1966–1972	Diest		
1972–1974	Beerschot		
1974–1977	FC Antwerp	85	(12)
1977–1981	Waterschei		
1981–1982	Beringen		
1982–1983	Winterslag		
1983–1984	Westerlo		

International career
1973–1980	Belgium	2	(0)

Managerial career
- 1996–1999: Westerlo
- 1999–2000: Genk
- 2002–2003: Lommel
- * Club domestic league appearances and goals

Jozef "Jos" Heyligen (born 30 June 1947) is a retired Belgian footballer.

== Career ==
During his career he played for Royal Antwerp F.C., K. Beringen F.C., and K.V.C. Westerlo. He earned 2 caps for the Belgium national football team, and participated in UEFA Euro 1980.

He was also the manager of K.R.C. Genk from 1999 to 2000.

== Honours ==
=== Player ===
==== Beerschot ====
- Belgian Cup: 1970–71

==== FC Antwerp ====
- Belgian Cup: 1974–75 (finalists)

==== Thor Waterschei ====
- Belgian Second Division: 1977–78

=== International ===
Belgium

- UEFA European Championship: 1980 (runners-up)
- Belgian Sports Merit Award: 1980

=== Individual ===
- Man of the Season (Belgian First Division): 1970–71

=== Manager ===
==== Racing Genk ====
- Belgian Cup: 1999–2000
