= Uwe Kirchner =

German footballer

Personal information
- Date of birth: 31 December 1965 (age 60)
- Place of birth: East Germany
- Position: Defender

Youth career
- 1979–1985: 1. FC Magdeburg

Senior career*
Years	Team	Apps	(Gls)
1985–1988	1. FC Magdeburg	56	(5)
1988–1990	Dynamo Dresden	19	(1)
1990	Hansa Rostock	2	(0)
1990–1991	Stahl Eisenhüttenstadt	2	(0)
Total		79	(6)

International career
	East Germany U-21	13	(0)
- * Club domestic league appearances and goals

Uwe Kirchner (born 31 December 1965) is a German former footballer.
