= Costel Solomon =

Romanian footballer

Personal information
- Date of birth: 29 May 1959 (age 67)
- Place of birth: Bacău, Romania
- Height: 1.77 m (5 ft 10 in)
- Positions: Defender; defensive midfielder

Youth career
- 1971–1974: Liceul de Fotbal Bacău

Senior career*
Years	Team	Apps	(Gls)
1974–1975	Știința Bacău		
1975–1976	SC Bacău		
1976	CSM Borzești		
1977	SC Bacău	1	(0)
1977–1978	Letea Bacău		
1978–1987	SC Bacău	261	(20)
1987–1989	Victoria București	71	(15)
1990	SC Bacău	18	(1)
1990	Maccabi Tel Aviv	1	(0)
1990–1992	Ceahlăul Piatra Neamț		
1992–1993	Sektzia Ness Ziona		
1993–1994	Speranța Nisporeni	14	(3)
1996–1997	Hakoah Amidar Ramat Gan		
Total		365	(39)

International career
1981	Romania	1	(0)
- * Club domestic league appearances and goals

Costel Solomon (born 29 May 1959) is a Romanian former football defender.

== International career ==
Costel Solomon played one friendly game at international level for Romania, coming as a substitute at half-time, replacing captain Costică Ștefănescu in a 2–1 loss against Bulgaria played on the 23 August stadium in Bucharest.
