= Franky Dekenne =

Belgian footballer

Personal information
- Date of birth: 7 July 1960 (age 66)
- Place of birth: Waregem, Belgium
- Position: Midfielder

Senior career*
Years	Team	Apps	(Gls)
1979–1988	Waregem	131	(5)
1988–1990	Royal Antwerp	44	(0)
1990–1995	Waregem		
1996	Westerlo	1	(0)

International career
1987–1988	Belgium	3	(0)

Managerial career
- 1996–1997: Westerlo
- 1997–2000: Torhout
- 2001–2002: Wevelgem City
- 2002: Denderleeuw
- 2003: Kortrijk
- 2003–2006: Racing Waregem
- 2007: Sint-Niklaas
- 2009–2012: Deinze
- 2012: Maldegem
- 2012–2015: Izegem
- 2015–2016: Ingelmunster
- * Club domestic league appearances and goals

Franky Dekenne (born 7 July 1960) is a Belgian football player and manager who played as a midfielder.
