= Johnny Hansen (footballer, born 1964) =

Danish footballer

Johnny Hansen (March 25, 1964) is a Danish former association football player. Born in Copenhagen, he played as a midfielder for Danish clubs Hvidovre IF, Ikast fS, Vejle BK, and Herning Fremad, as well as Sturm Graz in Austria. He played two games for the Denmark national football team in 1989.
