= Tomi Jalo =

Finnish footballer (1958-2009)

Personal information
- Date of birth: 22 October 1958
- Place of birth: Turku, Finland
- Date of death: 14 January 2009 (aged 50)
- Place of death: Turku, Finland
- Height: 1.82 m (6 ft 0 in)
- Position: Midfielder

Senior career*
Years	Team	Apps	(Gls)
1976–1989	TPS	299	(40)

International career
1980	Finland	1	(0)
- * Club domestic league appearances and goals

Tomi Jalo (22 October 1958 – 14 January 2009) was a Finnish footballer who played as a midfielder and spent his entire career with TPS. He competed in the men's tournament at the 1980 Summer Olympics.

His twin brother Timo is a former footballer for TPS.
