= Jean-Marie Houben =

Belgian footballer

Personal information
- Date of birth: 24 November 1966 (age 59)
- Place of birth: Liège, Belgium

International career
Years	Team	Apps	(Gls)
1989	Belgium	2	(0)

Jean-Marie Houben (born 24 November 1966) is a Belgian former footballer. He played in two matches for the Belgium national football team in 1989.
