= Günter Bittengel =

Czech footballer (born 1966)

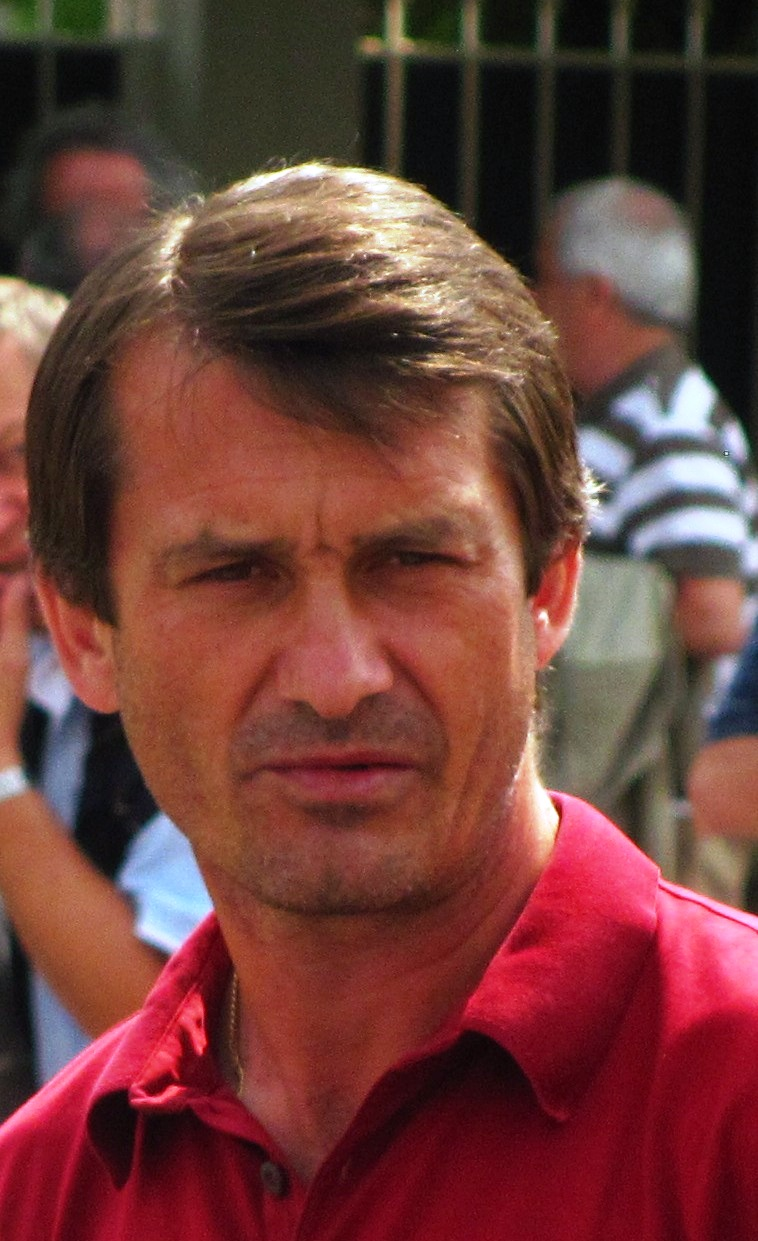
- Bittengel in 2012

Personal information
- Date of birth: 14 July 1966 (age 60)
- Place of birth: Prague, Czechoslovakia
- Height: 1.75 m (5 ft 9 in)
- Position: Striker

Youth career
- 1974–1985: Dukla Prague

Senior career*
Years	Team	Apps	(Gls)
1985–1991	Dukla Prague	159	(21)
1991–1996	Bayer Uerdingen	153	(20)
1997–2001	FK Chmel Blšany	93	(13)
Total		415	(54)

International career
1986–1988	Czechoslovakia U21	14	(3)
1987–1991	Czechoslovakia	4	(0)
1995	Czech Republic	1	(0)

Managerial career
- 2001–2003: FK Chmel Blšany
- 2003–2004: FK Viktoria Žižkov
- 2004–2005: SC Xaverov Horní Počernice
- 2005–2006: SK Union Čelákovice
- 2006–2009: FK Dukla Prague
- * Club domestic league appearances and goals

Günter Bittengel (born 14 July 1966) is a Czech football coach and former player. He played as a striker in the Czechoslovak First League and went on to play in the Czech First League after the dissolution of Czechoslovakia. As a result, he also represented both Czechoslovakia and the Czech Republic at international level.

== Club career ==
During his playing career, Bittengel made over 100 league appearances for Dukla Prague in six seasons at the club. He was part of the Dukla team which won the 1989–90 Czechoslovak Cup. Bittengel then went to Germany to play for Bayer Uerdingen. During his time in Germany he played 153 league matches, scoring a total of 20 goals.

Later in his career, Bittengel returned to the Czech Republic and played for FK Chmel Blšany, where he was the captain. Bittengel, Jan Šimák and Pavel Pergl scored the first-ever top-flight goals for Blšany, each finding the net in a 3–1 win away at Teplice in August 1998.

== International career ==
Bittengel played for the Czechoslovakia national under-21 football team between 1986 and 1988, scoring three times in 14 appearances. He progressed to the senior side, making his début for Czechoslovakia senior team in 1987. He played his fourth and final match for Czechoslovakia in 1991, but would go on to play for the newly independent Czech Republic in a 1995 match against Finland, his only appearance.

== Managerial career ==
As a manager, Bittengel's first Czech First League position was at FK Chmel Blšany, who he led between 2001 and 2003. He took charge of Blšany in the winter break of the 2001–02 Gambrinus liga, after the team had lost seven consecutive matches under boss Miroslav Beránek. Blšany remained in the top league throughout Bittengel's tenure, but suffered a run of five consecutive defeats at the beginning of the 2003–04 season. In October 2003, with the club still last in the table, having taken just two points from the opening ten matches, Bittengel was replaced by Michal Bílek.

He took over at FK Viktoria Žižkov in the winter break of the 2003–04 Gambrinus liga, with the club second from bottom in the league. The club were relegated at the end of the season and Bittengel left Žižkov to join SC Xaverov Horní Počernice, a team which had just been relegated to the Bohemian Football League, on a one-year contract.

Bittengel joined FK Dukla Prague in July 2006, while the team was in the Prague Championship. He led Dukla until December 2009, when Luboš Kozel was brought in to lead the team and Bittengel moved to a new role as sporting director.

== Honours ==
Dukla Prague Czechoslovak Cup: 1989–90
